= 2015 in public domain =

This is a list of authors whose works entered the public domain in part of the world in 2015.

== Entering the public domain in Europe ==
A work enters the public domain in most European countries (with the exception of Belarus) 70 years after the creator's death, if it was published during the author's lifetime. In 1995, the European Union extended copyright from life+50 to life+70, which had the effect of extending copyrights that had already expired. Thus the works of authors who died in 1944, which had entered the public domain in 1995, reentered the public domain in 2015.

Names	Country	Birth	Death	Occupation	Notable work
Jens Aarsbo	Denmark	15 February 1878	20 May 1944	Librarian, music writer	Fra den danske Musiks Historie
Bonifacio Abdon	The Philippines	14 May 1876	23 April 1944	Composer	Kundiman
Manuk Abeghian	Armenia	15 March 1865	26 September 1944	Folklorist, historian	Hay zhoghovurdi ar’aspelnerë Movses Khorenats’u Hayots’ Patmut’yan mej
Émile Achard	France	24 July 1860	7 August 1944	Internist	Manuel des maladies du tube digestif
Adela Marion Adam	United Kingdom	10 June 1866	12 August 1944	Classicist	Plato: Moral & Political Ideals
George Ade	United States	9 February 1866	16 May 1944	Writer	
Michael Adler	United Kingdom	27 July 1868	30 September 1944	Orthodox rabbi, historian, author	
Paul Adloff	Germany	9 February 1870	2 May 1944	Anthropologist, dentist	
Carl Aeschbacher	Switzerland	31 March 1886	29 January 1944	Composer, choirmaster	Huggenberger-Lieder
Freidun Aghalyan	Armenia	20 November 1876	1 February 1944	Architect	Kanaker HES
Roy Agnew	Australia	23 August 1891	12 November 1944	Composer, pianist	The Breaking of the Drought
Percy Alden	United Kingdom	6 June 1865	30 June 1944	Social worker, land reformer, politician	The Unemployed - A Social Question
Rayko Aleksiev	Bulgaria	7 March 1893	18 November 1944	Satirist, cartoonist	Caricatures in his newspaper, Shturets
Abdulla Aliş	Russia	15 September 1908	25 August 1944	Poet, playwright, writer	Sertotmas ürdäk
Pierre Allorge	France	12 April 1891	21 January 1944	Botanist	Essai de bryogéographie de la péninsule Ibérique
Helge Almquist	Sweden	17 December 1880	29 February 1944	Archivist, politician	Göteborgs historia 1619–1680, Göteborgs historia 1680–1718
Otto Alscher	Romania	8 January 1880	29 December 1944	Writer	Gogan und das Tier
Frantsishak Alyakhnovich	Belarus	9 March 1883	3 March 1944	Writer	In the Claws of the GPU
Marie Louise Amiet	France	17 April 1879	1944	Painter, illustrator	La Condamnation de Jeanne d'Arc vue à la lumière des grands événements du Moyen Âge
Charles Anderson	Australia	5 December 1876	25 October 1944	Mineralogist, palaeontologist	Bibliography of Australian Mineralogy
José André	Argentina	17 January 1881	13 July 1944	Composer	Sonatina for Piano
E. M. Antoniadi	France	1 March 1870	10 February 1944	Astronomer	Sur une Anomalie de la phase dichotome de la planète Vénus
Joseph Arthur Arkwright	United Kingdom	22 March 1864	22 November 1944	Doctor	The Carrier Problem in Infectious Diseases
Margaret Neilson Armstrong	United States	24 September 1867	18 July 1944	Designer, illustrator, author	Field Book of Western Wild Flowers
Walther Arndt	Germany	8 January 1891	26 June 1944	Zoologist, physician	Die biologischen Beziehungen zwischen Schwämmen und Krebsen
Zara Aronson	Australia	4 September 1864	1 July 1944	Journalist, editor, welfare worker, feminist, restaurateur	Twentieth Century Cookery Practice
George Arthurs	United Kingdom	13 April 1875	14 March 1944	Playwright, composer, author, screenwriter	Parts of the dialogue of The Yellow Mask
Miguel Asín Palacios	Spain	5 July 1871	12 August 1944	Scholar of Islamic studies and Arabic language, priest	La Escatología musulmana en la Divina Comedia
Percy Lee Atherton	United States	25 September 1871	8 March 1944	Composer	Violin Suite op.4
James Atkin, Baron Atkin	Australia	28 November 1867	25 June 1944	Lawyer, judge	Atkin's encyclopaedia of court forms in civil proceedings
Zurab Avalishvili	Georgia	1876	21 May 1944	Historian, jurist, diplomat	The Independence of Georgia in International Politics, 1918-1921
Arseny Avraamov	Russia	1884	19 May 1944	Composer	Simfoniya gudkov
Alfred Bachelet	France	26 February 1864	10 February 1944	Composer	Un jardin sur l'Oronte
Sir Edmund Backhouse, 2nd Baronet	United Kingdom	20 October 1873	8 January 1944	Scholar, linguist	China Under the Empress Dowager, Diary of His Excellency Ching Shan
Krzysztof Kamil Baczyński	Poland	22 January 1921	4 August 1944	Poet	In Purest Sorrow
Leo Baekeland	United States	14 November 1863	23 February 1944	Chemist, inventor of Bakelite and Velox photographic paper	His diary
Ernst Baeker	Germany	15 December 1866	13 June 1944	Composer	Vier Klavierstücke op.43
Wilhelmina Sherriff Bain	New Zealand	5 September 1848	26 January 1944	Teacher, librarian, feminist, peace activist, writer	From Zealandia
E. C. Stuart Baker	United Kingdom	1864	16 April 1944	Ornithologist	The bird-related section of The Fauna of British India, Including Ceylon and Burma, second edition
Stuart Ballantine	United States	22 September 1897	7 May 1944	Electronic engineer, inventor	Radio Telephony for Amateurs
József Balogh	Hungary	12 June 1893	1944	Philologist, historian	A klasszikus műveltségért
Jurgis Baltrušaitis	Lithuania	2 May 1873	3 January 1944	Poet, translator	
Ralph Henry Barbour	United States	13 November 1870	19 February 1944	Novelist	Phyllis in Bohemia
Charles Glover Barkla	United Kingdom	7 June 1877	23 October 1944	Physicist	Publications in Nature and Philosophical Transactions of the Royal Society
Georges Barrère	France	31 October 1876	14 June 1944	Flutist, composer	
Agustín Barrios	Paraguay	5 May 1885	9 August 1944	Composer, guitarist	La catedral
Victor Basch	France	18 August 1863	10 January 1944	Politician, philosopher	Les Origines de l'Individualisme Moderne
Elva Bascom	United States	20 June 1870	5 November 1944	Librarian	Indexing: Principles, Rules, and Examples
George Basden	United Kingdom	31 October 1873	30 December 1944	Archdeacon	Niger Ibos: A Description of the Primitives Lives, Customs and Animistic Beliefs, Etc., of the Ibo People of Nigeria
Umberto Bassignani	Italy	29 August 1878	21 January 1944	Sculptor	
Ferdinand Bastian	France	27 May 1868	29 June 1944	Poet	D'r Hans im Schnockeloch
John Batchelor	United Kingdom	20 March 1855	2 April 1944	Missionary	The Ainu of Japan
Jiří Baum	Czechia	20 September 1900	1944	Zoologist, museum curator, explorer, writer	Through the African Wilderness
Heinrich Baumgartner	Switzerland	16 July 1889	21 February 1944	Linguist	Das Verhältnis des deutschsprechenden Bielers zu seiner Mundart, zur Schriftsprache und zum Französischen
Amy Beach	United States	5 September 1867	27 December 1944	Composer, pianist	Mass in E-flat
Simanas Beliackinas	Lithuania	1 October 1875	1944	Jurist, publicist, writier	Žmonės ir likimas, romanų, apysakų rinkinys
Albert de Belleroche	United Kingdom	22 October 1864	14 July 1944	Painter, lithographer	Lili au bain, Portrait de jeune femme à chapeau, Berthe
Robert Bennett Bean	United States	1874	1944	Ethnologist	The Races of Man. Differentiation and Dispersal of Man
Princess Beatrice of the United Kingdom	United Kingdom	14 April 1857	26 October 1944	Royalty, translator	In Napoleonic Days
Vereen Bell	United States	5 October 1911	26 October 1944	Naval officer, novelist	Swamp Water
Wilhelm Bender	Germany	10 February 1911	23 March 1944	Composer, church musician	
William Gurney Benham	United Kingdom	16 February 1859	13 May 1944	Writer, newspaper editor	Benham's New Book of Quotations
Paul Berglar-Schröer	Germany	26 February 1884	September 1944	Journalist, writer	
Max Bergmann	United States	12 February 1886	7 November 1944	Biochemist	
Georg Bernhard	Germany	20 October 1875	10 February 1944	Publicist	Wirtschaftsparlamente. Von den Revolutionsräten zum Reichswirtschaftsrat
Joseph-Arthur Bernier	Canada	19 March 1877	28 April 1944	Composer	
Clóvis Beviláqua	Brazil	4 October 1859	26 July 1944	Jurist	Execução de um julgado: pareceres dos jurisconsultos
Johanna Beyer	United States	11 July 1888	9 January 1944	Composer	
Bhagvatsinhji	India	24 October 1865	9 March 1944	Maharaja of the princely state of Gondal, doctor, writer	Bhagavadgomandal
George David Birkhoff	United States	21 March 1884	12 November 1944	Mathematician, discoverer of Ergodic theory	Dynamical Systems with Two Degrees of Freedom
John Peale Bishop	United States	21 May 1892	4 April 1944	Poet, writer	Act of Darkness
Billy Bitzer	United States	21 April 1872	29 April 1944	Cinematographer	Billy Bitzer: His Story
Rufino Blanco Fombona	Venezuela	17 June 1874	16 October 1944	Literary historian, writer	Diario de mi vida. La novela de dos años (1904-1905), Camino de imperfección, Dos años y medio de inquietud
Marc Bloch	France	6 July 1886	16 June 1944	Historian	cofounded the highly influential Annales School of French social history
Capel Boake	Australia	29 August 1889	5 June 1944	Writer	
Gustav von Bodelschwingh	Germany	3 November 1872	26 February 1944	Pastor	Biography of his father, Friedrich von Bodelschwingh the Elder
Moissaye Boguslawski	United States	1 November 1887	30 August 1944	Composer, music teacher	Overture to a Carnival
Gerhard Bohlmann	Germany	18 December 1878	19 February 1944	Writer, journalist	Wallenstein ringt um das Reich
Gustav Böhm	Germany	27 January 1874	3 July 1944	Lawyer, writer	Des Faustinus Grobianus Querkopf empfindsame Reise an den Bodensee
Dzhoomart Bokonbaev	Kyrgyzstan	16 May 1910	1 July 1944	Poet	
Johannes Bollmann	Germany	3 September 1873	29 March 1944	Lawyer	Das Staatsrecht der Freien Hansestädte Bremen und Lübeck
Joseph-Ermend Bonnal	France	1 July 1880	14 August 1944	Composer	Paysages Euskariens
Joseph Bonnet	France	17 March 1884	2 August 1944	Composer	Historical Organ Recitals
Edmund von Borck	Germany	22 February 1906	16 February 1944	Composer	Five Orchestra Pieces, op. 8
Conrad Bornhak	Germany	21 March 1861	9 February 1944	Historian	Geschichte des preußischen Verwaltungsrechts
August Bostroem	Germany	17 July 1886	3 February 1944	Neurologist, psychiatrist	Über das Gesetz zur Verhütung erbkranken Nachwuchses vom Standpunkt des Psychiaters
Hugo Böttger	Germany	21 July 1863	17 February 1944	Politician, publicist	Handbuch für den Deutschen Burschenschafter
Eugène Louis Bouvier	France	9 April 1856	14 January 1944	Entomologist, carcinologist	Vie psychique des insectes
Louise Morey Bowman	Canada	17 January 1882	28 September 1944	Poet	Moonlight and Common Day, Dream Tapestries
James Boyd	United States	2 July 1888	25 February 1944	Novelist	Bitter Creek
C. V. Boys	United Kingdom	15 March 1855	30 March 1944	Physicist	Soap Bubbles: Their Colours and the Forces Which Mould Them
Edwin Emmanuel Bradford	United Kingdom	1860	1944	Clergyman, poet, novelist	The Romance of Youth and Other Poems
Max Brand	United States	29 May 1892	12 May 1944	Writer	Western stories
Clive Branson	United Kingdom	1907	1944	Artist, poet	An untitled poem that stats with Millions of years old -- over the whole
Mario Bravo	Argentina	27 June 1882	19 March 1944	Politician, writer	Capítulos de la legislación obrera
Georg Bredig	Germany	1 October 1868	24 April 1944	Chemist	Beiträge zur Stöchiometrie der Ionenbeweglichkeit
Rudolf Breitscheid	Germany	2 November 1874	24 August 1944	Politician	Antifaschistische Beiträge 1933–1939
Tom Brennan	Australia	1866	3 January 1944	Journalist, lawyer, politician	The Gun Alley Murder
George Sidney Brett	Canada	5 August 1879	27 October 1944	Psychologist	History of Psychology
Karl Bröger	Germany	10 March 1886	4 May 1944	Poet	
Carl Bruck	Germany	28 February 1879	12 June 1944	Doctor	Ueber die Erfolge mit der einzeitig kombinierten Salvarsan-Sublimatbehandlung der Syphilis nach Linser
Fritz Brukner	Austria	3 August 1881	4 July 1944	Literary theorist	Johann Nestroys ausgewählte Werke
Léon Brunschvicg	France	10 November 1869	18 January 1944	Philosopher	Héritage de Mots, Héritage d'Idées
Günther Bugge	Germany	23 July 1885	15 December 1944	Chemist, historian	Schieß- und Sprengstoffe und die Männer, die sie schufen
Gerhard Buhtz	Germany	24 February 1896	26 June 1944	Forensic doctor	
Albert Sybrandus Keverling Buisman	Netherlands	2 November 1890	1944	Engineer, professor	Grondmechanica
Henri Buisson	France	15 July 1873	6 January 1944	Physicist	Sur une modification des surfaces métalliques sous l'influence de la lumière
Sergei Bulgakov	Russia	28 July 1871	3 July 1944	Theologian, philosopher, priest, economist	The Lamb of God
Arthur Henry Reginald Buller	Canada	19 August 1874	13 July 1944	Mycologist	Researches on Fungi
Ernst Bunke	Germany	31 March 1866	30 January 1944	Pastor, writer	Glaube an den Herrn Jesum Christum
Richard Burmeister	United States	7 December 1860	19 February 1944	Composer	Albumblatt op.14
Judson Sykes Bury	United Kingdom	13 May 1852	10 June 1944	Physician, surgeon, neurologist	Clinical medicine: A manual for the use of students and junior practitioners
Olivia Ward Bush-Banks	United States	27 February 1869	1944	Poet, journalist	Driftwood
Bryant Butler Brooks	United States	5 February 1861	8 December 1944	Politician, businessperson, writer	Memoirs of Bryant B. Brooks: Cowboy, Trapper, Lumberman, Stockman, Oilman, Banker, and Governor of Wyoming
Joseph Caillaux	France	30 March 1863	22 November 1944	Politician	Whither France? Whither Europe?
Michel-Dimitri Calvocoressi	France	2 October 1877	1 February 1944	Poet	
John Kennedy Cameron	United Kingdom	11 May 1860	5 October 1944	Clergyman	
Joseph Campbell	United Kingdom	15 July 1879	6 June 1944	Poet	
José Luis Cantilo	Argentina	6 February 1871	11 October 1944	Politician	Quimera
Demetrios Capetanakis	Greece	22 January 1912	9 March 1944	Poet	
Alexis Carrel	France	28 June 1873	5 November 1944	Surgeon and biologist	
Boake Carter	United States	28 September 1903	16 November 1944	Journalist, writer	
Nicolae Cartojan	Romania	4 December 1883	20 December 1944	Literary historian	Cărțile populare în literatura românească
Ettore Castiglioni	Italy	28 August 1908	12 March 1944	Alpinist, writer	
Eugénio de Castro	Portugal	4 March 1869	17 August 1944	Poet, writer, academician	
James McKeen Cattell	United States	25 May 1860	20 January 1944	Psychologist	Published materials in scientific journals
Jean Cavaillès	France	15 May 1903	4 April 1944	Philosopher, logician	Méthode axiomatique et formalisme
Cécile Chaminade	France	8 August 1857	13 April 1944	Composer, pianist	Flute Concertino
Arnold Chaplin	United Kingdom	30 August 1864	18 October 1944	Physician	Fibroid Diseases of the Lung
Edward Keble Chatterton	United Kingdom	10 September 1878	31 December 1944	Writer	Through Brittany in "Charmina"
Pavel Chesnokov	Russia	24 October 1877	14 March 1944	Composer	Salvation is Created
Hedwige Chrétien	France	15 July 1859	1944	Composer	
George Chrystal	United Kingdom	28 August 1880	1 November 1944	Civil servant	Translated works and written works
Galeazzo Ciano	Italy	18 March 1903	11 January 1944	Diplomat, politician	Diary as a historic source
Raymond Clapper	United States	30 May 1892	1 February 1944	Commentator, news analyst	Watching the World
George Clausen	United Kingdom	18 April 1852	22 November 1944	Artist	
J. Storer Clouston	United Kingdom	23 May 1870	23 June 1944	Historian, writer	The Spy in Black, Beastmark the Spy
Humphrey Cobb	United States	5 September 1899	25 April 1944	Screenwriter, novelist	Paths of Glory
Irvin S. Cobb	United States	23 June 1876	11 March 1944	Surgeon and biologist	
Ernst Cohen	Netherlands	7 March 1869	6 March 1944	Chemist	
Emil Cohn	Germany	28 September 1854	28 January 1944	Physicist	
Stanton Coit	United Kingdom	11 August 1857	15 February 1944	Writer, politician, humanist	
Hendrikus Colijn	The Netherlands	22 June 1869	18 September 1944	Politician	Op de Grens van Twee Werelden
William Collier Sr.	United States	12 November 1864	13 January 1944	Writer, director	
Klara Hechtenberg Collitz	United States	30 May 1863	22 November 1944	Linguist	Verbs of Motion in their Semantic Divergence
Carlos Concha Cárdenas	Peru	27 November 1888	17 December 1944	Politician, diplomat	
Lev Conus	Russia	1871	18 January 1944	Composer	Fundamentals of Piano Technique
Will Marion Cook	United States	27 January 1869	19 July 1944	Composer	Cruel Papa!
Mortimer Elwyn Cooley	United States	28 March 1855	25 August 1944	Engineer	
Everard Charles Cotes	United Kingdom	1862	4 October 1944	Entomologist	A Catalogue of the Moths of India
Johannes Cotta	Germany	13 July 1862	28 August 1944	Writer	
Henry Coward	United Kingdom	26 November 1849	10 June 1944	Conductor, composer	
John Duncan Cowley	United Kingdom	3 October 1897	20 August 1944	Librarian, writer	A Bibliography of Abridgments, Digests, Dictionaries, and Indexes of English Law to the Year 1800
Hermann Cranz	Germany	12 August 1883	6 February 1944	Engineer, professor	Versuche mit Schmierringen bei höheren Tourenzahlen
Benjamin Crémieux	France	1 December 1888	14 April 1944	Writer, historian	Inquiétude et Reconstruction
David Moore Crook	United Kingdom	24 November 1914	18 December 1944	Fighter pilot	Spitfire Pilot
William Percival Crozier	United Kingdom	1 August 1879	16 April 1944	Writer, journalist	Letters of Pontius Pilate: Written During His Governorship of Judea to His Friend Seneca in Rome
Walter Ewing Crum	United Kingdom	22 July 1865	20 April 1944	Coptologist	A Coptic Dictionary
Leonard Crunelle	United States	8 July 1872	10 September 1944	Sculptor	Lincoln the Debater
W. E. Cule	United Kingdom	5 December 1870	13 July 1944	Author	The Man at the Gate of the World, Sir Knight of the Splendid Way
Charles Madison Curry	United States	16 May 1869	14 March 1944	Literature professor, author, literary reviewer	Holton-Curry Reader
Olive Custance	United Kingdom	7 February 1874	12 February 1944	Poet	The Inn of Dreams
John Wesley Dafoe	Canada	8 March 1866	9 January 1944	Journalist	Laurier: A Study in Canadian Politics
Eduardo Dagnino	Italy	1 January 1876	30 January 1944	Composer	Meditazione
Jákup Dahl	Denmark	5 June 1878	5 June 1944	Writer, translator	Føroysk mállæra til skúlabrúks
Cyrus Edwin Dallin	United States	22 November 1861	14 November 1944	Sculptor	
Joseph Dalman	Germany	31 October 1882	20 June 1944	Screenwriter	S.A.-Mann Brand
René Daumal	France	16 March 1908	21 May 1944	Spiritual para-surrealist writer, critic, poet	Mount Analogue
Charles Davenport	United States	1 June 1866	18 February 1944	Biologist, eugenicist	Heredity in Relation to Eugenics
David Davies, 1st Baron Davies	United Kingdom	11 May 1880	16 June 1944	Politician, philanthropist	The Problem of the Twentieth Century
Anton Delbrück	Germany	23 January 1862	21 February 1944	Psychiatrist	Die pathologische Lüge und die psychisch abnormen Schwindler: Eine Untersuchung über den allmählichen Übergang eines normalen psychologischen Vorgangs in ein pathologisches Symptom für Ärzte und Juristen
Alessandro Della Seta	Italy	29 June 1879	10 September 1944	Archaeologist, civil servant	Italia Antica
Walter Del Mar	United States	28 May 1862	10 April 1944	Banker, stock broker, journalist, world traveler, writer	Around the World Through Japan
Princess Der Ling	China	8 June 1885	22 November 1944	Writer	
Lyster Hoxie Dewey	United States	1865	1944	Botanist	
Wilhelm Diehl	Germany	10 January 1871	12 September 1944	Theologian	
Enrique Díez Canedo	Spain	7 January 1879	6 June 1944	Poet, translator, literary critic	
Alan Dinehart	United States	3 October 1889	18 July 1944	Actor, director, writer, and stage manager	
Katharine Elizabeth Dopp	United States	1 March 1863	14 March 1944	Educator	
Keith Douglas	United Kingdom	24 January 1920	9 June 1944	Poet, writer	Alamein to Zem Zem
Conrad Dreher	Germany	30 October 1859	6 December 1944	Actor	Works in poetry
Elizabeth Wharton Drexel	United States	22 April 1868	13 June 1944	Author, philanthropist, and socialite	King Lehr and the Gilded Age, Turn of the World
Lili Droescher	Germany	10 April 1871	10 April 1944	Pedagogue	
Sandra Droucker	Russia	7 May 1875	1 April 1944	Pianist, composer	
Pericle Ducati	Italy	11 July 1880	28 October 1944	Archaeologist	Contributo allo studio dell'arce etrusca di Marzabotto
Eduard Duckesz	Germany	3 August 1868	6 March 1944	Rabbi	Zur Geschichte und Genealogie der ersten Familien der hochdeutschen Israeliten-Gemeinden in Hamburg-Altona: Anlässlich des 250jährigen Stadtjubiläums von Altona
Bide Dudley	United States	8 September 1877	4 January 1944	Drama critic, playwright	
John Wight Duff	United Kingdom	4 September 1866	9 December 1944	Classicist	A Literary History of Rome
Georg Duffing	Germany	11 April 1861	5 April 1944	Engineer, inventor	Reibungsversuch am Gleitlager, Verein Deutscher Ingenieure -Zeitschrift
Clyde A. Duniway	United States	2 November 1866	24 December 1944	Educator and academic administrator	The development of freedom of the press in Massachusetts
Henry Durand-Davray	France	11 July 1873	21 January 1944	Writer, translator	Chez les Anglais pendant la grande guerre
Wolf Durmashkin	Lithuania	7 March 1914	September 1944	Composer	
H. Kempton Dyson	United Kingdom	24 January 1880	15 January 1944	Structural engineer, civil engineer, architect, editor, writer	
Elsbeth Ebertin	Germany	14 May 1880	28 November 1944	Artist, writer, astrologer	Der Mars im Todeshaus
Félix Éboué	France	1 January 1884	17 May 1944	Colonial administrator	The New Indigenous Policy for French Equatorial Africa
Arthur Eddington	United Kingdom	28 December 1882	22 November 1944	Astronomer, physicist, and mathematician	
Otto Eichrodt	Germany	25 June 1867	19 January 1944	Artist, poet, composer	
Richard Eilmann	Germany	25 March 1893	February 1944	Archaeologist	Labyrinthos: Ein Beitrag zur Geschichte einer Vorstellung und eines Ornamentes
Frank Elgee	United Kingdom	8 November 1880	7 August 1944	Archaeologist, geologist, naturalist	The Moorlands of North-Eastern Yorkshire, The Romans in Cleveland, Early Man in North East Yorkshire
Carl Engel	United States	21 July 1883	6 May 1944	Composer	
Νικόλαος Επισκοπόπουλος	Greece	29 April 1874	22 March 1944	Novelist	
John William Henry Eyre	United Kingdom	18 July 1869	17 February 1944	Bacteriologist, ophthalmologist	The Elements of Bacteriological Technique
Manfred Faber	Germany	26 October 1879	16 May 1944	Architect	Billige Kleinwohnungen. Ein Vorschlag
Arthur Fairbanks	United States	13 November 1864	13 January 1944	Historian	
Philip Michael Faraday	United Kingdom	1 January 1875	6 February 1944	Lawyer, surveyor, composer, organist, theatrical producer	Amāsis; or An Egyptian Princess
John Bretland Farmer	United Kingdom	5 April 1865	26 January 1944	Botanist	
James Farrar	United Kingdom	5 October 1923	26 July 1944	Poet	
Jean-Louis Faure	France	27 October 1863	26 October 1944	Surgeon	Au Groenland avec Charcot
Félix Fénéon	France	22 June 1861	29 February 1944	Art critic, gallery director, writer	
Edwin Hurry Fenwick	United Kingdom	1856	1944	Urologist	
Johannes Ficker	Germany	12 November 1861	19 June 1944	Theologian, historian, archeologist	
William Coles Finch	United Kingdom	23 October 1864	6 June 1944	Historian, writer	
Thomas Fiske	United States	1865	10 January 1944	Mathematician	Functions of a complex variable
Moshe Ze'ev Flinker	Netherlands	9 October 1926	1944	Diarist	Young Moshe's Diary
Carl Flesch	Hungary	9 October 1873	14 November 1944	Composer, music teacher	Scale System
Benton Fletcher	United Kingdom	22 October 1866	31 December 1944	Musicologist, illustrator	
Hanns Floerke	Germany	25 March 1875	1944	Art historian, writer	Studien zur niederländischen Kunst- und Kulturgeschichte
Hulbert Footner	United States	2 April 1879	17 November 1944	Writer	Madame Storey
Izola Forrester	United States	15 November 1878	6 March 1944	Writer	
Edith Henrietta Fowler	United Kingdom	16 February 1865	18 November 1944	Writer	
Ralph H. Fowler	United Kingdom	17 January 1889	28 July 1944	Physicist, astronomer	
Philip Fox	United States	7 March 1878	21 July 1944	Astronomer	
Philipp Franck	Germany	9 April 1860	13 March 1944	Painter, graphic artist, illustrator.	
Leonard Franklin	United Kingdom	15 November 1862	11 December 1944	Barrister, politician	Percentage Proportional Representation
Harold Fraser-Simson	United Kingdom	15 August 1872	19 January 1944	Composer	The Maid of the Mountains
Max Frey	(Germany)	16 April 1874	11 March 1944	Painter, graphic artist	
Guðmundur Friðjónsson	Iceland	24 October 1869	26 June 1944	Writer	
Pavel Friedmann	Czechia	17 January 1921	29 September 1944	Poet	The Butterfly
Gerhard Fritzsche	Germany	23 April 1911	1944	Writer, songwriter	Gelobt sei deine Treu
Hermann Fühner	Germany	10 April 1871	11 January 1944	Pharmacist, Doctor	Lithotherapie. Historische Studien über die medizinische Verwendung der Edelsteine
Seiichi Fujiwara	Japan	10 January 1908	18 September 1944	Poet, translator	Poems published in literary magazines
Rio Gebhardt	Germany	1 November 1907	24 June 1944	Composer	Aus der Spielzeugschachtel
Edith Mary Gell	United Kingdom	1860	17 April 1944	Writer, Christian activist	The New Girl; Womanhood and Fellowship; The Resurrection of a Nation; The Liberation of Spiritual Force; Womanhood at the Crossroads
Karl August Gerhardi	Germany	2 May 1864	3 March 1944	Doctor, writer	
Mirza Gelovani	Georgia	2 March 1917	July 1944	Poet	
Heinrich Gerland	Germany	3 April 1874	28 December 1944	Jurist	Problematik der gegenwärtigen Reformlage im Rechtstudium an den deutschen Hochschulen
Katharine Elizabeth Fullerton Gerould	United States	6 February 1879	27 July 1944	Writer, essayist	
Jan van Gilse	Netherlands	11 May 1881	8 September 1944	Composer, conductor	Thijl
Petr Ginz	Czechia	1 February 1928	28 September 1944	Editor, diarist	The Diary of Petr Ginz 1941–1942
Jean Giraudoux	France	29 October 1882	31 January 1944	Novelist, essayist, diplomat and playwright	Siegfried et le Limousin, Eglantine
Reginald Gleadowe	United Kingdom	6 May 1888	9 October 1944	Teacher, designer	Oxford University and the fine arts: Inaugural lecture delivered before the University on 1 February 1928
Wenzeslaus von Gleispach	Austria	22 August 1876	12 March 1944	Lawyer, jurist	Deutsches Strafverfahrensrecht. Ein Grundriss
Hirsh Glick	Lithuania	1922	1944	Songwriter	Zog nit keyn mol
Adolf Glinger	Austria	13 August 1873	30 April 1944	Writer	
Ulrich Gmelin	Germany	6 October 1912	30 June 1944	Historian	Papsttum und Germanenwelt im frühen Mittelalter: Anspruch und Methode des heiligen Petrus
Frederic A. Godcharles	United States	3 June 1872	30 December 1944	Politician, historian, author	Pennsylvania: Political, Governmental, Military and Civil
Branca de Gonta Colaço	Portugal	8 July 1880	22 March 1944	Writer, linguist	
Heinz Gordon	Germany	17 December 1871	14 June 1944	Screenwriter	
Percy Gothein	Germany	22 May 1896	22 December 1944	Writer	Die antiken Reminiszenzen in den Chansons de Geste
Paul Graener	Germany	11 January 1872	13 November 1944	Composer	
Bruno Granichstaedten	Austria	1 September 1879	30 May 1944	Composer	
Claire Annabel Caroline Grant Duff	United Kingdom	25 December 1870	12 January 1944	Poet, writer	A Victorian Childhood
Roberto Grau	Argentina	18 March 1900	12 April 1944	Chess player	Tratado General de Ajedrez
Luise Greger	Germany	27 December 1862	25 January 1944	Composer	
Philip Guedalla	United Kingdom	12 March 1889	16 December 1944	Barrister, writer, biographer	
Alice Gurschner	Austria	8 October 1869	26 March 1944	Writer	
Lauri Haarla	Finland	18 February 1890	24 October 1944	Writer	Hanuumanin tytär, Lemmin poika
Pavel Haas	Czech Republic	21 June 1899	17 October 1944	Composer	
Walter Hackett	United States	10 November 1876	20 January 1944	Playwright	
Charles Hainchelin	France	2 August 1901	26 August 1944	Historian	
Max Halbe	Germany	4 October 1865	30 November 1944	Dramatist	
John Frederick Halls Dally	United Kingdom	2 August 1877	4 November 1944	Physician	High blood pressure, its variations and control : manual for practitioners
Gontran Hamel	France	December 1883	16 August 1944	Phycology	Chlorophycées des côtes française, Floridées de Franc, Phéophycées de France
Nelson Harding	United States	31 October 1879	30 December 1944	Editorial cartoonist	Toppling the Idol
Haydon Hare	United Kingdom	2 July 1869	22 April 1944	Composer	O God our help
Annie Jessie Fortescue Harrison	United Kingdom	30 December 1848	12 February 1944	Composer	In the Gloaming (song)
Wilhelm Hartenstein	Germany	1 October 1888	27 January 1944	Waffen-SS officer	Der Kampfeinsatz der Schutzpolizei bei inneren Unruhen
Sadakichi Hartmann	United States	8 November 1867	22 November 1944	Art critic, poet, anarchist	
Paul Hatschek	Czechia	11 March 1888	15 May 1944	Engineer	
Otto Hauser	Austria	22 August 1876	26 May 1944	Author	
Muzagit Hayroudinoff	Russia	26 March 1901	4 September 1944	Poet, prosaist	
Carl Eduard Hellmayr	Austria	29 January 1878	24 February 1944	Ornithologist	
Gilbert Helmer	Austria	2 January 1864	4 March 1944	Priest, theologian, politician	
Jarl Hemmer	Finland	18 September 1893	6 November 1944	Author	Realm of the Rye
George Cockburn Henderson	Australia	1 May 1870	9 April 1944	Historian	
Carl Heinrici	Germany	21 May 1876	26 May 1944	Lawyer, jurist	Rechtsvergleichendes Handwörterbuch für das Zivil- und Handelsrecht des In- und Auslandes
George Herriman	United States	22 August 1880	25 April 1944	Cartoonist	Krazy Kat
Heinrich Hess	Austria	29 December 1857	7 March 1944	Alpinist, author	Der Hochtourist in den Ostalpen
Max Heuwieser	Germany	21 September 1878	10 May 1944	Historian	
Eva Heyman	Hungary	13 February 1931	17 October 1944	Diarist	Her diary
Charles Hill-Tout	Canada	28 September 1858	30 June 1944	Ethnologist, folklorist	British North America: I. The far West, home of the Salish and Déné
Gustav Hochstetter	Germany	12 May 1873	26 July 1944	Writer, poet	Maruschka Braut gelibbtes
Paul Oskar Höcker	Germany	17 December 1865	6 May 1944	Writer	Gottgesandte Wechselwinde
Arnold Hodson	United Kingdom	12 February 1881	26 May 1944	Colonial administrator	Where Lion Reign: an account of lion hunting and exploration in South West Abyssinia
Milan Hodža	Slovakia	1 February 1878	27 June 1944	Journalist, politician	Československý rozkol: príspevky k dejinám slovenčiny
Arthur Hofmann	Germany	19 April 1863	3 March 1944	Historian	Des Arbeiters Maifest
Hermann Hoffmann (Psychiatrist)	Germany	6 June 1891	13 June 1944	Psychiatrist	Vererbung und Seelenleben: Einführung in d. psychiatr. Konstitutions- u. Vererbungslehre
Lou Henry Hoover	United States	29 March 1874	7 January 1944	First lady, translator	English translation of De re metallica
Julius Höxter	Germany	4 February 1873	5 April 1944	Educator, writer	Quellenbuch zur jüdischen Geschichte und Literatur
John Gruffydd Moelwyn Hughes	United Kingdom	30 May 1866	25 June 1944	Hymn-writer, poet	Caniadau Moelwyn
Josef Hupka	Austria	22 February 1875	23 April 1944	Jurist	Das Haager Wechselrechtsübereinkommen und der Völkerbund
Hans Hyan	Germany	2 June 1868	6 January 1944	Artist, writer	Bilder aus dem Berliner Leben
Chester Edward Ide	United States	13 June 1877	18 March 1944	Composer	
Karl Immanuel Immer	Germany	1 May 1888	6 June 1944	Theologian	Coetus Epistles
Berthold Jacob	Germany	12 December 1898	26 February 1944	Journalist, pacifist	
Max Jacob	France	12 July 1876	5 March 1944	Poet, painter, writer, and critic	
C. J. Cutcliffe Hyne	United Kingdom	11 May 1866	10 March 1944	Novelist	The Lost Continent: The Story of Atlantis
Inoue Tetsujirō	Japan	1 February 1895	7 December 1944	Philosopher	A Dictionary of Philosophy
Karol Irzykowski	Poland	23 January 1873	2 November 1944	Writer, literary critic, film theoretician, chess player	Pałuba
Shigetoshi Ishihara	Japan	3 February 1872	1 March 1944	Historian, educator	Meiji Tennō Go-Jungōki
Elisabeth Janstein	Austria	19 October 1893	31 December 1944	Poet, journalist	Gebete um Wirklichkeit
Joseph Jastrow	United States	30 January 1863	8 January 1944	Psychologist	Keeping Mentally Fit newspaper column
Juliusz Kaden-Bandrowski	Poland	24 February 1885	8 August 1944	Journalist, novelist	Piłsudczycy
Paul Kalweit	Germany	17 February 1867	19 April 1944	Theologian	Zur Frage der kritischen Auflösung des Problems der Willensfreiheit
Jirō Kameda	Japan	11 September 1876	8 February 1944	Linguist, philologist	Hirano Yōshū Ōden
Wassily Kandinsky	Russia	16 December 1866	13 December 1944	Painter, art theorist	
Kang Kyeong-ae	South Korea	20 April 1906	26 April 1944	Novelist	
Teppei Kataoka	Japan	2 February 1894	25 December 1944	Novelist	Asa no Musume
Wilhelm Kathol	Germany	1 November 1854	24 April 1944	Chemist	„Baßmes“ Hof. Sauerländisches Dorfleben vor hundert Jahren
Dick Kattenburg	Netherlands	11 November 1919	30 September 1944	Composer	Romanian Melody for Violin, Cello and Piano
Berl Katznelson	Israel	25 January 1887	12 August 1944	Journalist	Collected works in 12 volumes in Modern Hebrew, 1946–1950
Ignaz Kaup	Austria	11 January 1870	25 March 1944	Public health care expert, constitution researcher	
Kawai Eijirō	Japan	13 February 1891	15 February 1944	Economist, philosopher	Fasshizumu Hihan
Konrad Keilhack	Germany	16 August 1858	10 March 1944	Geologist	Lehrbuch der Grundwasser- und Quellenkunde: für Geologen, Hydrologen, Bohrunternehmer, Brunnenbauer, Bergleute, Bauingenieure und Hygieniker
Franz Keller	Germany	24 July 1873	6 June 1944	Theologian	Pflanzschule der christlichen Liebestätigkeit
Edgar Stillman Kelley	United States	14 April 1857	12 November 1944	Composer	The Pilgrim's Progress
Otto Kemptner	Austria	19 August 1890	3 March 1944	Augustinian canon	Wer trägt die Schuld?
Mark Kerr	United Kingdom	26 September 1864	10 January 1944	Military officer, writer	The Sailor's Nelson
Malikh Kharis	Russia	27 January 1915	14 March 1944	Writer	
Martin Kießling	Germany	28 April 1879	2 April 1944	Architect	
Kanjū Kiga	Japan	15 March 1873	11 November 1944	Economist, politician	Nōson Mondai
Charles Herbert Kitson	United Kingdom	13 November 1874	13 May 1944	Organist, music teacher, educator	Elementary Harmony 3 volumes, Six Lectures on Accompanied Vocal Writing, The Elements of Musical Composition
Maria Leopoldine Klausberger	Austria	2 December 1888	21 January 1944	Journalist	
Hilma af Klint	Sweden	26 October 1862	21 October 1944	Artist, mystic	
Hans Kloepfer	Austria	18 August 1867	27 June 1944	Doctor, poet	
Hugo Knepler	Austria	10 August 1872	1944	Art dealer, music publisher	
Friedrich Koepp	Germany	10 August 1860	9 May 1944	Archaeologist	Römer in Deutschland, Germania Romana
Dénes Kőnig	Hungary	21 September 1884	19 October 1944	Mathematician	Theorie der endlichen und unendlichen Graphen
Bernhard Köster	Germany	20 October 1869	23 June 1944	Priest, writer	Im Feuer der Kartaune
Arsen Kotsoyev	Russia	15 January 1872	4 February 1944	Poet, translator	
Mathilde Kralik	Austria	3 December 1857	8 March 1944	Composer	
Hans Krása	Czech Republic	30 November 1899	17 October 1944	Composer	
Georg Richard Kruse	Germany	17 January 1856	23 February 1944	Musicologist	Albert Lortzing. Berühmte Musiker. Lebens- und Charakterbilder nebst Einführung in die Werke der Meister
Julius Kugy	Italy	19 July 1858	5 February 1944	Mountaineer, writer, botanist, humanist, lawyer, military officer	Aus dem Leben eines Bergsteigers
Hermann Kükelhaus	Germany	4 August 1920	20 January 1944	Poet	His short poem in a letter to his brother, Hugo
Paul Ladmirault	France	8 December 1877	30 October 1944	Composer, music critic	Myrdhin, La Jeunesse de Cervantès
W. A. Lambeth	United States	27 October 1867	24 June 1944	Medical professor, amateur architect	Jefferson as an Architect
Heinrich Langwost	Germany	15 April 1874	6 June 1944	Politician	Unter gelb-weißem Banner
Napoleon Lapathiotis	Greece	31 October 1888	7 January 1944	Poet	Τὸ παλιό μας τραγοῦδι, Μικρὸ τραγοῦδι
Josef Lappe	Germany	2 March 1879	6 March 1944	Educator, historian, politician	Die Sondergemeinden der Stadt Lünen. Ein Beitrag zur Geschichte der deutschen Stadtverfassung
Albert Lauscher	Germany	18 February 1872	23 May 1944	Priest, theologian	Die katholisch-theologische Fakultät der Rheinischen Friedrich-Wilhelm-Universität zu Bonn
Sylvio Lazzari	France	30 December 1857	10 June 1944	Composer	Effet de nuit
Stephen Leacock	Canada	30 December 1869	28 March 1944	Teacher, political scientist, writer, humourist	Sunshine Sketches of a Little Town
Eduard Lederer	Czechia	15 July 1859	5 June 1944	Writer, playwright, poet, lawyer	Žid v dnešní společnosti
Edward Edson Lee	United States	2 September 1884	28 September 1944	Children's literature author	Jerry Todd series, Poppy Ott series, Trigger Berg series, Andy Blake series, Tuffy Bean series
William Ellery Leonard	United States	25 January 1876	2 May 1944	Poet, playwright, translator, literary scholar	Beowulf: A New Verse Translation for Fireside and Class Room
Ernest Lerwile	France	4 August 1863	6 April 1944	Composer	Don Quichotte de la Manche
Friedrich Pels Leusden	Germany	12 August 1866	16 March 1944	Surgeon, politician	Chirurgische Operationslehre für Studierende und Ärzte
Alun Lewis	United Kingdom	1 July 1915	5 March 1944	Poet	
René Leynaud	France	24 August 1910	13 June 1944	Poet	
Franz Linke	Germany	4 January 1878	23 March 1944	Geophysicist, meteorologist	Die physikalischen Grundlagen der Bioklimatologie
Gina Lombroso	Italy	24 September 1868	15 January 1944	Physician, writer, psychiatrist, criminologist	Sulle condizioni sociali economiche degli operai di un sobborgo di Torino, L'Anima della Donna, Cesare Lombroso. Storia della vita e delle opere narrata dalla figlia
Lionel Lukin	Australia	4 January 1868	1 June 1944	Judge	Justices' Civil Jurisdiction
William George MacCallum	Canada	18 April 1874	3 February 1944	Physician, pathologist	A Textbook of Pathology
Vytautas Mačernis	Lithuania	5 June 1921	7 October 1944	Poet	Vizijos
Bernardino Luíz Machado Guimarães	Portugal	28 March 1851	29 April 1944	Politician, scholar	Introdução à Pedagogia
Julius Magnus	Germany	6 September 1867	15 May 1944	Lawyer, jurist	Die Rechtsanwaltschaft in den verschiedenen Ländern
Aristide Maillol	France	8 December 1861	27 September 1944	Sculptor, painter, printmaker	Air
Ernst Mally	Austria	11 October 1879	8 March 1944	Philosopher	
Ștefania Mărăcineanu	Romania	18 June 1882	15 August 1944	Physicist	Les substances radioactives sous l'effet du rayonemnet solaire provoquent la pluie
Filippo Tommaso Marinetti	Italy	22 December 1876	2 December 1944	Poet, editor, art theorist	
Mary Paley Marshall	United Kingdom	24 October 1850	19 March 1944	Economist	What I Remember
Carl Mayer	Austria	20 November 1894	1 July 1944	Screenplay writer	
August L. Mayer	Germany	27 October 1885	12 March 1944	Curator, art historian	Mittelalterliche Plastik in Spanien
Douglas Crawford McMurtrie	United States	20 July 1888	29 September 1944	Typeface designer, graphic designer, historian, bibliographer of printing	A History of Printing in the United States, The Book: the Story of Printing & Bookmaking
Carl Meinhof	Germany	23 July 1857	11 February 1944	Linguist	
Alex Melrose	Australia	16 May 1865	2 September 1944	Poet, dramatist	Song and Slapstick
José Manuel Agosto Méndez	Venezuela	9 July 1871	4 February 1944	Doctor, poet, journalist, educator	Bolívar State Anthem
Julia Menz	Germany	25 February 1901	7 March 1944	Travel writer, musician	Alte Tanzweisen und Lieder aus verschiedenen Ländern
Maria Messina	Italy	14 March 1887	19 January 1944	Writer	La casa nel vicolo
Arnold Oskar Meyer	Germany	20 October 1877	3 June 1944	Historian	Deutsche und Engländer. Wesen und Werden in großer Geschichte
Hugo Michel	Germany	4 April 1866	9 June 1944	Stamp collector	Kriegsmarken-Katalog 1920
Glenn Miller	United States	1 March 1904	15 December 1944	Composer, bandleader	(I've Got a Gal In) Kalamazoo
Konstantin Minyar-Beloruchev	Russia	10 October 1874	10 January 1944	Composer	2 Pieces for Cello Solo
Roy Mitchell	Canada	4 February 1884	27 July 1944	Theatre practitioner, Theosophist	Shakespeare for Community Players, Theosophy in Action, Creative Theatre
Wilhelm von Möllendorff	Germany	6 December 1887	10 February 1944	Anatomist	
Piet Mondrian	Netherlands	7 March 1872	1 February 1944	Painter, art theoretician	Composition II in Red, Blue, and Yellow
Annie de Montfort	France	16 December 1897	10 November 1944	Writer, physician	Pologne
Alfred Montmarquette	Canada	6 April 1871	24 May 1944	Composer	
Walter Guinness, 1st Baron Moyne	United Kingdom	29 March 1880	6 November 1944	Politician, businessman	War diaries edited by Brian Bond
Wilhelm Muehlon	Germany	31 October 1878	5 February 1944	Diplomat	Die Verheerung Europas
Karl Mühlberger	Austria	21 August 1857	15 March 1944	Composer	Kaiserjägermarsch
Emma Müllenhoff	Germany	22 September 1871	14 April 1944	Writer	
Edvard Munch	Norway	12 December 1863	12 January 1944	Painter	The Scream
Kaj Munk	Denmark	13 January 1898	4 January 1944	Playwright, Lutheran pastor	
Kurt Münzer	Germany	18 April 1879	27 April 1944	Writer	Taten und Kränze: Lieder zum Kriege
Romolo Murri	Italy	27 August 1870	12 March 1944	Politician	
Gustav Friedrich Nagel	Germany	19 March 1868	6 March 1944	Theologian	
John Harper Narbeth	United Kingdom	26 May 1863	19 May 1944	Naval architect	A Naval Architect’s Practical Experience in the Behaviour of Ships
Henri Nathansen	Denmark	17 July 1868	16 February 1944	Writer, stage director	Indenfor Murene
Mary Neal	United Kingdom	5 June 1860	22 June 1944	Social worker, suffragette collector of English folk dances	The Espérance Morris Book: A Manual of Morris Dances, Folk-songs, and Singing Games
Max Nettlau	Germany	30 April 1865	23 July 1944	Historian	La Première Internationale en Espagne (1868–1888)
Robert Nichols	United Kingdom	6 September 1893	17 December 1944	Writer, poet, playwright	Wings over Europe, The Smile of the Sphinx, Golgotha & co
Masao Nishi	Japan	24 April 1896	16 April 1944	Political activist	
Hakuun Nishiyama	Japan	3 April 1877	15 September 1944	Poet	His haiku works
Mario Novaro	Italy	25 September 1868	9 August 1944	Poet, philosopher	Murmuri ed echi
Elisabeth von Oertzen	Germany	19 July 1860	29 April 1944	Writer	Schattenkinder – Sonnenkinder. Ein Werberuf: Großstadtkinder aufs Land!
Masasuke Ogata	Japan	1883	1944	Botanist	Icones Filicum Japoniae
Shinpei Ogura	Japan	4 June 1882	8 February 1944	Linguist	Chōsengo hōgen no kenkyū
Hamid Olimjon	Uzbekistan	12 December 1909	3 July 1944	Poet, playwright, scholar, literary translator	Muqanna, Jinoyat
August Oxé	Germany	23 July 1863	16 March 1944	Archaeologist	Corpus vasorum Arretinorum
Hotsumi Ozaki	Japan	29 April 1901	7 November 1944	Journalist	Recent developments in Sino-Japanese relations Japanese Council, Institute of Pacific Relations 1936
Vlaho Paljetak	Croatia	7 August 1893	2 October 1944	Composer	
Gerhart Panning	Germany	10 June 1900	22 March 1944	Forensic pathologist	Die vitale Reaktion am Knochen
Alfons Paquet	Germany	26 January 1881	8 February 1944	Journalist, writer	In Palästina
Kiril Parlichev	Bulgaria	1 March 1875	9 February 1944	Public figure	The Serbian Regime and the Revolutionary Struggle in Macedonia
Charles O. Paullin	United States	20 July 1869	1 September 1944	Historian	The Navy of the American Revolution: Its Administration, Its Policy, and its Achievements
Jacques Pellegrin	France	12 June 1873	12 August 1944	Zoologist	Contribution à l'étude anatomique, biologique et taxinomique des poissons de la famille des cichlidés
Pedro Piccatto	Uruguay	8 August 1908	26 February 1944	Poet	
Jean-Marie Plum	Belgium	30 June 1899	28 March 1944	Composer	
Carl Ernst Poeschel	Germany	2 September 1874	19 May 1944	Printer, typographer, publisher	Zeitgemässe Buchdruckkunst
Paul Poiret	France	20 April 1879	30 April 1944	Fashion designer	
Ambrose Pratt	Australia	31 August 1874	13 April 1944	Writer	
Arthur Prüfer	Germany	7 July 1868	3 June 1944	Musicologist	Johann Hermann Schein und das weltliche Lied des 17. Jahrhunderts
Hans Leo Przibram	Austria	7 July 1874	20 May 1944	Biologist	
Gertrud von Puttkamer	Germany	4 April 1881	September 1944	Writer, poet	
Arthur Quiller-Couch	United Kingdom	21 November 1863	12 May 1944	Writer	
Joaquín Álvarez Quintero	Spain	20 January 1873	14 June 1944	Dramatist	
Prafulla Chandra Ray	India	2 August 1861	June 1944	Chemist, educationist, historian, industrialist, philanthropist	
Egon Redlich	Czechia	13 October 1916	24 October 1944	Educator	His diary
Oswald Redlich	Austria	17 September 1858	20 January 1944	Historian, archivist	
Willy Peter Reese	Germany	22 January 1921	June 1944	Soldier	Mir selber seltsam fremd
Paul Reno	Germany	17 November 1887	25 June 1944	Screenwriter	
Emanuel Ringelblum	Poland	21 November 1900	1944	Historian, politician and social worker	Notes from the Warsaw Ghetto, Notes on the Refugees in Zbąszyn
Otto Ritschl	Germany	26 June 1860	28 September 1944	Theologian	System und systematische Methode in der Geschichte des wissenschaftlichen Sprachgebrauchs und der philosophischen Methodologie
William Emerson Ritter	United States	21 November 1856	10 January 1944	Biologist	
Friedrich Ritter von Lama	Austria	4 September 1877	9 February 1944	Writer, journalist	
John Keith Roberts	Australia	16 April 1897	26 April 1944	Physicist	Heat and Thermodynamics
W. Heath Robinson	United Kingdom	31 May 1872	13 September 1944	Cartoonist, illustrator, artist	
Maria Rodziewiczówna	Poland	2 February 1863	6 November 1944	Writer	Wrzos, Dewajtis, Lato leśnych ludzi, Straszny dziadunio
Ignaz Rohr	Germany	29 June 1866	7 February 1944	Theologist	Der Straßburger Bildhauer
Romain Rolland	France	29 January 1866	30 December 1944	Dramatist, novelist, essayist, art historian and mystic	1915 Nobel laureate for Literature
Konstantin Rösch	Germany	12 February 1869	23 February 1944	Theologian	
Vincent Rose	United States	13 June 1880	20 May 1944	Violinist, pianist, composer, bandleader	
Willy Rosen	Germany	1894	1 October 1944	Composer and songwriter	
Oskar Rosenfeld	Austria	13 May 1884	August 1944	Writer	
Nikolai Roslavets	Ukraine	4 January 1881	23 August 1944	Composer	
Petko Rossen	Bulgaria	15 October 1880	30 April 1944	Politician	
Felix Rötscher	Germany	23 April 1873	11 April 1944	Engineer	Die Maschinenelemente
Ker-Xavier Roussel	France	10 December 1867	6 June 1944	Painter	
Régis Roy	Canada	16 February 1864	23 August 1944	Writer	Les joyeux petits contes canadiens
Sergey Rudakov	Canada	21 October 1909	15 January 1944	Poet, comparative literature analyst	31 August
Hermann Rüdisühli	Switzerland	10 June 1864	27 January 1944	Painter	
Owen Rutter	United Kingdom	7 November 1889	2 August 1944	Historian, novelist, travel writer	Tiadatha, Travels of Tiadatha
Antoine de Saint-Exupéry	France	29 June 1900	31 July 1944	Writer, poet, aristocrat, journalist, pioneering aviator	The Little Prince
Erich Salomon	Germany	28 April 1886	7 July 1944	Photographer	
Achilleas Samothrakis	Greece	1876	31 May 1944	Physician, writer	Λεξικόν, γεωγραφικό και ιστορικό της Θράκης
Hanns Sassmann	Austria	17 December 1882	8 May 1944	Playwright, journalist, screenwriter	
Frida Schanz	Germany	16 May 1859	17 June 1944	Writer	
Karl Schloß	Germany	6 January 1876	3 January 1944	Writer	
Bastian Schmid	Germany	29 December 1870	25 June 1944	Theologian	
Joseph Schmidlin	Germany	29 March 1876	10 January 1944	Catholic priest	Katholische Missionslehre im Grundriss
Leo Schulz	United States	28 March 1865	12 August 1944	Professor, composer	
George B. Seitz	United States	3 January 1888	8 July 1944	Playwright, screenwriter, film actor, director	
Edgar Selwyn	United States	20 October 1875	13 February 1944	Actor, playwright, director and producer	
Narendra Nath Sen Gupta	India	23 December 1889	13 June 1944	Psychologist, philosopher	Introduction to Social Psychology
Lev Shcherba	Russia	3 March 1880	26 December 1944	Linguist	Russkie glasnye v kachestvennom i kolichestvennom otnoshenii
Alexander Shenshin	Russia	1890	1944	Composer	
Paul Siedentopf	Germany	3 September 1870	29 February 1944	Writer, publisher	
William James Sidis	United States	1 April 1898	17 July 1944	Child prodigy	The Animate and the Inanimate
Peter Adalbert Silbermann	Germany	8 December 1878	April 1944	Diplomat, teacher	
Israel Joshua Singer	United States	30 November 1893	10 February 1944	Novelist	The Brothers Ashkenazi
Leone Sinigaglia	Italy	14 August 1868	16 May 1944	Composer	
Karel Škorpil	Bulgaria	15 May 1859	9 March 1944	Archaeologist and museum worker	
Jonas Šliūpas	Lithuania	15 May 1859	9 March 1944	Archaeologist and museum worker	Gadynė šlėktos viešpatavimo Lietuvioje 1569–1795
Konstantin Ivanovich Sotonin	Russia	10 March 1893	1944	Philosopher	
C. H. Souter	Australia	11 October 1864	20 August 1944	Medical practitioner, writer, poet	Wrong Righted
Valentin Stang	Germany	22 May 1876	18 June 1944	Writer, journalist	Tierheilkunde und Tierzucht
Eugen Steinach	Austria	28 January 1861	14 May 1944	Physiologist	Verjüngung durch Experimentelle Neubelebung der Alternden Pubertätsdrüse
Karl Steinacker	Germany	2 September 1872	31 January 1944	Art historian	
Jane T. Stoddart	United Kingdom	2 November 1863	15 December 1944	Journalist	
Adolf Josef Storfer	Austria	11 January 1888	2 December 1944	Lawyer, journalist, publisher	Im Dickicht der Sprache
Hermann Struck	Germany	6 March 1876	11 January 1944	Artist	
Albert Südekum	Germany	25 January 1871	18 February 1944	Journalist, politician	
Takekichi Sugai	Japan	1871	1944	Dermatologist	Academic papers co-authored by other Japanese dermatologists
Hugo Suolahti	Finland	7 October 1874	23 February 1944	Politician, linguist, philosopher	
Jan Šverma	Czechia	23 March 1901	10 November 1944	Journalist, politician	Role českého národa v historii
Béla Szász	Romania	30 October 1872	29 September 1944	Pastor, writer	Br. Bánffy Dezső egyházkerületi főgondnok emlékezete
James Tait	United Kingdom	19 June 1863	4 July 1944	Historian	Mediaeval Manchester and the Beginnings of Lancashire
Tokio Takeuchi	Japan	26 October 1894	24 April 1944	Physicist	His works on physical cosmology
Ida Tarbell	United States	5 November 1857	6 January 1944	Teacher, author and muckraking journalist	The History of the Standard Oil Company
Ernst Thälmann	Germany	16 April 1886	18 August 1944	Politician	
Delfino Thermignon	Italy	26 May 1861	30 May 1944	Composer, conductor, music teacher	Manuale di musica ad uso delle Scuole e Società corali
Henry Francis Herbert Thompson	United Kingdom	2 April 1859	26 May 1944	Egyptologist	Research papers on Demotic
Emil Thoroddsen	Iceland	16 June 1898	7 July 1944	Composer	Íslands Hrafnistumenn, Hver á sér fegra föðurland
Frederick Augustus Todd	Australia	14 March 1880	13 June 1944	Professor	De musis in carminibus poetarum Romanorum commemoratis
Michie Tono	Japan	8 March 1870	13 December 1944	Educator	
Adolf Tortilowicz von Batocki-Friebe	Germany	31 July 1868	22 May 1944	Lawyer, politician	Preussen, der Kern der deutschen Verfassungsfrage
Nobuo Tsumura	Japan	5 January 1909	27 June 1944	Poet	Aisuru Kami no Uta
Marcel Tyberg	Austria	27 January 1893	31 December 1944	Composer, organist	Symphony No. 2 in F minor
Max Uhle	Germany	25 March 1856	11 May 1944	Archaeologist	The Ruins of Tiahuanaco in the Highlands of Ancient Peru
Jakob Johann von Uexküll	Germany	8 September 1864	25 July 1944	Biologist	Lebensphilosophie
Viktor Ullmann	Austria	1 January 1898	18 October 1944	Composer	Der zerbrochene Krug op.36
Ernest Ewart Unwin	Australia	13 July 1881	20 September 1944	Educationalist	Pond Problems
Iosif Utkin	Russia	27 May 1903	13 November 1944	Poet, journalist	Dear Childhood
Antonio Videgain	Spain	10 March 1869	9 February 1944	Composer	Buscando compañia
Paul Viereck	Germany	22 January 1865	9 February 1944	Philologist, epigraphist, papyrologist	Bericht über die griechischen Papyrusurkunden
Hans Völter	Germany	16 July 1890	19 May 1944	Politician	Bericht über die griechischen Papyrusurkunden
Victor Vreuls	Belgium	4 February 1876	27 July 1944	Composer	
Karl Heinz Wagner	Germany	10 July 1907	6 February 1944	Prehistorian	Die keltische Mauer von Manching
Fritz Walz	Germany	5 June 1858	16 March 1944	Publisher	Deutsche Wehr-Politik der Zukunft: Von einem Auslanddeutschen
Oskar Walzel	Austria	28 October 1864	29 December 1944	Literary scholar	Gehalt und Gestalt im Kunstwerk des Dichters
Ojzer Warszawski	Poland	15 April 1898	10 October 1944	Writer, artist, art critic	Szmuglerzy, Mundur, Żniwa
Boris Wassiljewitsch Warnecke	Russia	3 June 1874	31 July 1944	Philologist	Drevnejšie obitateli Novorossii
Karel Weis	Czechia	13 February 1862	4 April 1944	Composer	
Hermann Wenzel	Germany	16 December 1863	17 June 1944	Composer	Schweizer Salon Albums
Rex Whistler	United Kingdom	24 June 1905	18 July 1944	Painter, designer, illustrator	
Ulrich Wilcken	Germany	18 December 1862	10 December 1944	Historian, papyrologist	
Else Wildhagen	Germany	10 January 1863	9 August 1944	Writer	
Wendell Willkie	United States	18 February 1892	8 October 1944	Lawyer	One World
Mary Knight Wood	United States	17 April 1857	20 December 1944	Composer	Ashes of Roses
Harold Bell Wright	United States	4 May 1872	24 May 1944	Writer	
Carl Valentin Wunderle	United States	13 April 1866	16 February 1944	Composer	
Takeo Yaginuma	Japan	1895	12 December 1944	Songwriter, soldier	Tōhikō
Chikusanjin Yuasa	Japan	8 April 1875	2 January 1944	Musicologist	
Yi Yuksa	Korea	18 May 1904	16 January 1944	Poet	
Mehmet Emin Yurdakul	Turkey	13 May 1869	14 January 1944	Writer, politician	
Yoshio Yusa	Japan	18 January 1889	17 November 1944	Jurist	His works on civil code
Riccardo Zandonai	Italy	28 May 1883	5 June 1944	Composer	Francesca da Rimini
Władysław Zawistowski	Poland	21 June 1897	30 December 1944	Theater critic	Amor felix
Jean Zay	France	6 August 1904	20 June 1944	Politician	Le Drapeau
Franz Zelger	Switzerland	16 June 1864	7 January 1944	Jurist	An der Wiege der Aktiengesellschaft des Katholischen Kulturvereins in Luzern
Heinz Otto Ziegler	Czechia	11 March 1903	4 May 1944	Political scientist	Die moderne Nation. Ein Beitrag zur politischen Soziologie
Lode Zielens	Belgium	13 June 1901	28 November 1944	Novelist, journalist	Moeder, waarom leven wij?
Tadeusz Stefan Zieliński	Poland	14 September 1859	8 May 1944	Philologist, historian, translator	Die Gliederung der altattischen Komoedie, Tragodumenon libri tres, Iresione
Juozas Zikaras	Lithuania	18 November 1881	10 November 1944	Sculptor, artist	Statue of Liberty in Kaunas
Edgar Zilsel	United States	11 August 1891	11 March 1944	Historian, philosopher, creator of Zilsel Thesis	The Application Problem: a Philosophical Investigation of the Law of Large Numbers and its Induction
James Fulton Zimmerman	United States	11 September 1887	20 October 1944	Historian	The Coronado Cuarto Centennial
Ernst Zimmermann	Germany	15 July 1860	6 January 1944	Geologist	Stratigraphische und paläontologische Studie über das deutsche und das alpine Rhät
Rudolf Ewald Zingel	Germany	5 September 1876	20 February 1944	Composer	Margot, Der wilde Jäger
Eduard Zirm	Austria	18 March 1863	15 March 1944	Ophthalmologist	Die Welt als Fühlen
Georg Zoch	Germany	2 September 1902	13 March 1944	Screenwriter	Screenplay for The Degenhardts

=== Sortable list ===
Alphabetical	Names	Country	Birth	Death
354	Mary Edith Durham	UK	8 December 1863	15 November 1944
428	Sir Francis Charles Fuller	UK	22 November 1866	20 September 1944
429	Hampton Pitts Fulmer	US	23 June 1875	19 October 1944
430	Simon Henry Gage	US	20 May 1851	20 October 1944
431	Charles Kelsey Gaines	US	21 October 1854	2 January 1944 (wrongly listed 1943)
432	Kenneth Cecil Gandar-Dower	UK	13 August 1908	12 February 1944
437	Virginio Gayda	It	12 August 1885	14 March 1944
443	Giovanni Gentile	It	30 May 1875	15 April 1944
447	Charles Dana Gibson	US	14 September 1867	23 December 1944
448	Wg-Cdr Guy (Penrose) Gibson	UK	12 August 1918	19 September 1944
453	Leone Ginzburg, a.k.a. Leonida Gianturco	It	4 April 1909	5 February 1944
461	Adolph Goldschmidt	DE	15 January 1863	5 January 1944
466	Godfrey Jervis Gordon	UK	11 March 1882	2 February 1944
471	Harvey Grace	UK	25 January 1874	15 February 1944
475	Caswell Grave	US	24 January 1870	8 January 1944
477	Augusto Graziani	It	6 January 1865	31 March 1944
479	Johannes Greber	DE	2 May 1874	31 March 1944
481	Charles Alfred Howell Green	UK	19 August 1864	7 May 1944
492	Emma Laure Esther Guilbert	FR	20 January 1865	3 February 1944
494	Selskar Michael Gunn	US	25 May 1883	2 August 1944
497	Rev William Norman Guthrie	US	4 March 1868	9 December 1944
498	James Taylor Gwathmey	US	1863 Or 1865 Sep 10	11 February 1944
508	Sir Robert William Hamilton	UK	26 August 1867	5 July 1944
509	Han Yong-Un	Kr	29 August 1879	29 June 1944
510	Harris Hancock	US	14 May 1867	19 March 1944
511	Edward Joseph Hanna	US	21 July 1860	10 July 1944
512	Ian Campbell Hannah	UK	16 December 1874	7 July 1944
513	(Albert Auguste) Gabriel Hanotaux	FR	19 November 1853	11 April 1944
514	Allen Oscar Hansen	US	21 September 1881	20 January 1944
515	Hutchins Hapgood	US	21 May 1869	19 November 1944
516	Yoshimichi Hara	Jp	13 February 1867	7 August 1944
517	Sir Cecil Harcourt-Smith	UK	11 September 1859	27 March 1944
523	Antonín Hartl	CS	11 December 1885	19 February 1944
527	Helen (Julia) Hay, Mrs Whitney	US	1875	1944
528	(William James) Herbert Hayens	UK	1861	22 January 1944
531	Paul (Gustave-Marie-Camille) Hazard	FR	20 April 1878	13 April 1944
535	Amos Arthur Heller	US	21 March 1867	18 May 1944
541	William D Henderson	US	27 November 1866	26 May 1944
542	Yandell Henderson	US	23 April 1873	18 February 1944
543	Philippe Henriot	FR	7 January 1889	28 June 1944
544	Paul Hensel	DE	3 October 1867	8 January 1944
546	Bruno Héroux	DE	20 December 1868	14 February 1944
547	Christine Herrick née Terhune	US	13 June 1859	2 December 1944
548	George Joseph Herriman	US	22 August 1880	25 April 1944
563	Camill Hoffmann	CS	31 October 1878	1944 Oct Or Nov
567	Sir William (Searle) Holdsworth	UK	7 May 1871	2 January 1944
574	Hoyt Hopewell Hudson	US	6 July 1893	13 June 1944
576	Walter Hullihen	US	26 May 1875	14 April 1944
577	Rev Marion Palmer Hunt	US	1860	1944
581	Miller Reese Hutchison	US	6 August 1876	16 February 1944
586	Eduardo Innes González	VE	1882	1 November 1944
599	Milena Jesenská	CS	10 August 1896	17 May 1944
600	Walter Albert Jessup	US	12 August 1877	7 July 1944
601	Samuel Leo Jodidi	US	6 October 1867	31 December 1944
602	Prof Douglas Wilson Johnson	US	30 November 1878	24 February 1944
603	George Johnson	US	22 February 1889	5 June 1944
605	Edward Johnston	UK	11 February 1872	26 November 1944
607	Will B Johnstone	US	1881	6 February 1944
609	Prof Griffith Hartwell Jones	UK	1859 Wrongly 1858	27 May 1944
610	Aksel Gustav Salomon Josephson	US	2 October 1860	12 December 1944
611	Theodore Goldsmith Joslin	US	28 February 1890	12 April 1944
612	Frederick William Jowett	UK	1864	1 February 1944
613	Louis Alphonse Julianelle	US	12 March 1895	12 August 1944
616	Oleh Olexandrowytsch Kandyba	Su	8 July 1907	10 June 1944
618	Itzhak Katzenelson	Pl	1 July 1886	1 May 1944
620	Prof Alexander Samuel Kaun	US	30 October 1889	22 June 1944
624	Arthur Keith	US	30 September 1864	7 February 1944
625	Prof Arthur Berriedale Keith	UK	5 April 1879	6 October 1944
634	Philip Davie Kerrison	US?	1861	1944
635	Peter Kien	DE	1 January 1919	1944 Oct
638	David Kinley	US	2 August 1861	3 December 1944
639	Clement Kinloch-Cooke, 1st Baronet Kinloch-Cooke of Brighthelmstone	UK	1854	4 September 1944
640	Bishop Frederick Joseph Kinsman	US	27 September 1868	19 June 1944
641	Fr Josef Kirchhoff	DE	18 December 1892	24 April 1944
643	Shepherd Ulverston / Braithwaite Kitchin	ZA	1877	6 May 1944
646	Israel Jacob Kligler	US	24 April 1889	23 September 1944
648	Erich Knauf	DE	21 February 1895	2 May 1944
652	(William) Frank(=Franklin) Knox	US	1 January 1874	28 April 1944
653	Frederick Henry Koch	US	12 September 1877	16 August 1944
655	Max Kommerell	DE	25 February 1902	25 July 1944
656	Alexander Koshetz	Su	1875	21 September 1944
658	Prof Aleksandr (Petrovich) Kotelnikov	Su	20 October 1865	6 March 1944
660	Prof. Leon Tadeusz Kozlowski	Pl	6 June 1892	11 May 1944
662	Emil (Paul Ernst Olaf Friedrich) Krückmann	DE	14 May 1865	23 June 1944
663	Herman Kruk	Pl	1897	18 September 1944
668	Isolde Kurz	DE	21 December 1853	5 or 6 April 1944
673	Louis Laloy	FR	18 February 1874	3 or 4 March 1944
677	Walter Savage Landis	US	5 July 1881	15 September 1944
678	Paul Ludwig Landsberg	DE	3 December 1901	2 April 1944
679	Leonard Langheinrich(-Anthos)	DE	17 May 1890	7 June 1944
684	William John Lawson	UK	?	After 1864
686	John Joseph Leary	US	2 February 1874	4 January 1944
687	Sir John Charles Grant Ledingham	UK	1875	4 October 1944
688	Blair Lee	US	9 August 1857	25 December 1944
690	Gerald Stanley Lee	US	1862	1944
691	Prof. Edward Leen	IE	1885	10 November 1944
692	Rev. George Robinson Lees	UK	1860	2 March 1944
694	Thomas Joseph Lennon	US	27 January 1896	13 November 1944
703	Bernard Lichtenberg	US	11 August 1892	3 October 1944
704	Richard Lieber	US	5 September 1869	15 April 1944
705	Polita De Lima De Castillo	Ve	5 September 1869	21 March 1944
706	Joseph Crosby Lincoln	US	13 February 1870	10 March 1944
709	Herbert George De Lisser	UK	9 December 1873 or 1878	18 or 19 May 1944
710	Grace Denio Litchfield	US	19 November 1849	4 December 1944
712	John Frederick Bligh Livesay	CA	23 January 1875	15 June 1944
713	Arthur Livingston	US	30 September 1883	11 February 1944
714	Luis Llorens Torres	PR	14 May 1876 or 1878	15 or 16 June 1944
715	Frank Joseph Loesch	US	9 April 1852	31 July 1944
717	Basil Kellett Long	ZA?	1878	2 January 1944
720	Niko Lortkipanidse	Su	17 September 1880	25 May 1944
722	Hugh Cecil Lowther, 5th Earl of Lonsdale	UK	25 January 1857	13 April 1944
723	Basil Lubbock	UK	9 September 1876	3 September 1944
726	Sir John Lumsden	Ie	14 November 1869	1944 Sep
727	Sir Edwin Landseer Lutyens	UK	29 March 1869	1 January 1944
730	Sir Henry George Lyons	UK	11 October 1864	10 August 1944
731	Cleland Boyd McAfee	US	1866	1944
733	Alexander Watts McCoy	US	6 February 1889	30 June 1944
734	Nelson Glenn McCrea	US	18 September 1863	31 May 1944
736	Greville Matheson Macdonald	UK	20 January 1856	3 November 1944
740	John Steven McGroarty or M'Groarty	US	20 August 1862	7 August 1944
742	Frank McIntyre	US	5 January 1865	16 February 1944
744	James Rion McKissick	US	13 October 1884	3 September 1944
745	Archibald Campbell MacLaren	UK	1 December 1871	17 November 1944
746	Ida Smedley Maclean	UK	1877	2 March 1944
750	Lesley James McNair	US	25 May 1883	25 July 1944
751	Col John Robert Jermain Macnamara	UK	1 October 1905	2 December 1944
752	Charles Linza McNary	US	12 June 1874	25 February 1944
754	Aimee Semple McPherson, Aimee Semple MacPherson	US	9 October 1890	27 September 1944
755	Ian Macpherson	UK	5 October 1905	15 July 1944
756	Lucullus Virgil McWhorter	US	1860	1944
759	Sir Ian Zachary Malcolm	UK	3 September 1868	28 December 1944
761	Margaret Eliza Maltby	US	10 December 1860	3 May 1944
763	Alfred James Margetson	UK	7 March 1877	3 May 1944
766	Sándor Marót	Hu	4 March 1884	June 1944
768	Frank James Marshall	US	10 August 1877	9 or 10 November 1944
770	Sir John Martin-Harvey	UK	22 June 1863	14 May 1944
771	Emmanuel de Martonne	FR	1 April 1873	24 July 1944
772	Walter Taylor Marvin	US	28 April 1872	26 May 1944
773	Edward Bennett Mathews	US	16 August 1869	4 February 1944
774	Sir Miles Mattinson	UK	26 December 1854	29 February 1944
776	Philip Ainsworth Means	US	3 April 1892	24 April 1944
777	Philip Mechanicus	Nl	?	12 October 1944
780	Carl Friedrich Michael Meinhof	DE	23 July 1857	11 February 1944
783	Wightman Fletcher Melton	US	26 September 1867	1944
785	Hugh Victor Mercer	US	26 January 1869	16 July 1944
788	Myron Metzenbaum	US	1 April 1876	25 January 1944
789	Alfred Henry Meyer	US	28 May 1888	30 December 1944
791	Isidor Meyer	Ch	8 January 1860	22 February 1944
792	Ernest Claude Meysey-Thompson	UK	1859	28 February 1944
793	Carl Christian Mez	DE	26 March 1866	8 January 1944
795	Thomas Midgley Jr.	US	18 May 1889	2 November 1944
796	Maciej (Ignacy Przeclaw) Mielzynski, a.k.a. Mathias von Brudzewo-Mielzynski, a.k.a. Nowina Doliwa	Pl	13 October 1869	9 January 1944
797	William Ephraim Mikell	US	29 January 1868	20 January 1944
798	Charles Addison Miller	US	29 December 1867	22 November 1944
799	Jack Miner	CA	10 April 1865	3 November 1944
802	Thomas Walker Mitchell	UK	18 January 1869	19 December 1944
803	Petter Moen	NO	14 January 1901	8 September 1944
804	James Moffatt	UK	4 July 1870	27 June 1944
806	James Reid Moir	UK	3 June 1879	24 February 1944
810	Sir Leo George Chiozza Money	UK	13 June 1870	25 September 1944
813	Thomas Sturge Moore	UK	4 March 1870	18 July 1944
815	Sir Alfred Bishop Morine	CA	31 March 1857	18 December 1944
816	Dave Hennen Morris	US	24 April 1872	4 May 1944
826	Jean Elmslie Henderson Findlay	UK	1886	20 March 1944
827	Canon John Owen Farquhar Murray	UK	6 May 1858	29 November 1944
829	Alois Musil	CS	30 June 1868	12 April 1944
831	Leo Myers	UK	6 September 1881 (wrongly listed 1880)	8 April 1944 (wrongly listed 7 April)
836	Pedro Navarro González	Ve	20 April 1882	13 August 1944
838	Robert Chancellor Nesbitt	UK	1868	27 January 1944
843	Lubor Niederle	CS	20 September 1865	14 June 1944
844	Frederick John Niven	CS	31 March 1878	30 January 1944
846	George William Norris	US	11 July 1861	2 September 1944
847	William Harmon Norton	US	1856	1944
849	Alexei (Silych) Novikov-Priboy	Su	12 March 1877	29 or 30 April 1944
850	Sir Percy Nunn	UK	1870	12 December 1944
851	David Wright O'Brien	US	1918	1944
852	Karl Joseph Obser	DE	16 January 1860	21 January 1944
853	Cardinal William Henry O'Connell	US	8 December 1859	22 April 1944
855	Eoin O'Duffy	Ie	30 October 1892	30 November 1944
857	John Myers O'Hara	US	1870	1944
858	Erich Ohser	DE	18 March 1903	6 April 1944
860	Julius Emil Olson	US	9 November 1858	1944
861	Charles Kingston O'Mahony	UK	1884	9 November 1944
862	Rose Cecil O'Neill	US	1874	6 April 1944
863	Kiheiji Onozuka	Jp	21 December 1870	27 November 1944
866	Bernhard Ostrolenk	US	14 May 1887	26 November 1944
867	Gov Miguel Antonio Otero (II)	US	17 October 1859	7 August 1944
869	Frank William Padelford	US	6 April 1872	18 February 1944
870	Lionel Frank Page	CA	17 December 1884	26 August 1944
872	(Georges) Maurice Paléologue	FR	13 January 1859	18 November 1944
873	Clement Charlton Palmer	UK	1871	13 August 1944
874	John Leslie Palmer	UK	4 September 1885	5 August 1944
877	Robert Ezra Park	US	14 February 1864	7 February 1944
879	Louis Napoleon Parker	UK	21 October 1852	22 September 1944
881	Morris Longstreth Parrish	US	1867	1944
882	James Morton Paton	US	1863	1944
883	Frank Allen Patterson	US	14 August 1878	4 August 1944
885	Maurice Eden Paul	UK	1865	1 December 1944
886	Elizabeth Stancy Payne	US?	?	1944
887	Endicott Peabody	US	30 May 1857	17 November 1944
888	Bishop Herbert Sidney Pelham	UK	1881	11 March 1944
889	Frédéric Pelletier	CA	1 May 1870	30 May 1944
891	Sydney Perks	UK	2 January 1864	2 November 1944
893	Clarence Arthur Perry	US	4 March 1872	5 September 1944
896	Frank H D Pickersgill	CA	1915	1944
899	Amos Richards Eno Pinchot	US	6 December 1873	18 February 1944
900	Julio Piquet	Uy	1861	24 February 1944
902	Lucien (Camille) Pissarro	FR/UK:1916 on	20 February 1863	10 July 1944 (wrongly listed 11 July)
903	William Carter Platts	UK	5 August 1864	7 April 1944
905	Elizabeth Burke-Plunkett, Countess of Fingall, née Burke	Ie	1865	1944
908	Alfred William Pollard	UK	14 August 1859	8 March 1944
911	François Porché	FR	21 November 1877	19 April 1944
912	John Bonsall Porter	UK/CA	1 October 1861	17 March 1944
913	Arthur Blackburne Poynton	UK	28 June 1867	8 October 1944
914	Sir David Prain	UK	11 July 1857	17 March 1944
916	James Bissett Pratt	US	22 June 1875	15 January 1944
917	Vojtěch Preissig	CS	31 July 1873	11 June 1944
918	Harold Adye Prichard	US?	14 December 1882	4 May 1944
923	Pierre Firmin Pucheu	FR	27 June 1883 or 1899	20 March 1944
925	Emily James Putnam, née Smith	US	15 April 1865	7 September 1944
927	Manuel L. Quezon	Ph	19 August 1878	1 August 1944
928	Oliver Chase Quick	UK	1885	21 January 1944
929	Sir Arthur Thomas Quiller-Couch (pen name: Q)	UK	21 November 1863	12 May 1944
930	Isaac Raboy	US	1882	1944
932	Miklós Radnóti	Hu	5 May 1909	9 November 1944
935	Philip Max Raskin	US	24 December 1884	6 February 1944
936	Henry Cushier Raven	US	16 April 1889	5 April 1944
940	Liviu Rebreanu	Ro	27 November 1885	1 September 1944
943	James A. Reed	US	9 November 1861	8 September 1944
946	Harry Fielding Reid	US	18 May 1859	18 June 1944
947	Grete Reiner(-Straschnow) née Stein	DE	20 November 1892	9 March 1944
948	Deneys Reitz	ZA	2 April 1882	19 October 1944
952	Arthur Richman	US	16 April 1886	10 September 1944
953	Wilhelm Adolf Karl Richter	DE	29 November 1892	14 March 1944
955	Theodor Riewerts	DE	28 October 1907	17 February 1944
956	Abraham Mitrie Rihbany	US?	1869	1944
959	José Ignacio Rivero Y Alonso	Cu	3 February 1895	1 April 1944
964	Agnes Mary Frances Robinson, 1:Mrs Darmesteter, 2:Mrs Duclaux	UK	27 February 1857	9 February 1944 Or 7
966	Miguel Rocha	Ve	?	2 April 1944
968	Romain Rolland	FR	29 January 1866	30 December 1944
969	Sir Humphry Davy Rolleston, 1st Baronet Rolleston of Upper Brook Street	UK	21 June 1862	23 September 1944 Wrongly 24
970	Erwin (Johannes Eugen) Rommel	DE	15 November 1891	14 October 1944 Or 17
971	Theodore Roosevelt Jr.	US	13 November 1887	12 July 1944
973	John Lawyer Rose	US	13 April 1897	13 April 1944
976	Louis George Rothschild, Georges Mandel	FR	5 June 1885	7 July 1943 or 1944
978	Jacques Roumain	Ht	4 June 1907	18 August 1944
981	Robert James Rowlette	Ie	16 October 1873	13 October 1944
988	Frank Ryan	Ie	1902	10 June 1944
989	Bernard Sachs	US	2 January 1858	8 February 1944
992	Eduardo Sánchez de Fuentes y Peláez	Cu	3 April 1876	7 September 1944
993	Dwight Sanderson	US	25 September 1878	27 September 1944
995	Leonard Sargent	US	1857	1944
998	Jakob Schaffner	Ch	14 November 1875	25 September 1944
1000	Emil Schaus	DE	14 November 1869	28 February 1944
1002	James Augustin Brown Scherer	US	22 May 1870	15 February 1944
1003	Josef Schick	DE	21 December 1859	13 February 1944
1004	Hans Schiebelhuth	DE/US?	11 October 1895	14 January 1944
1005	Sydney Schiff, Stephen Hudson	UK	12 December 1868	29 October 1944
1009	Ludwig Schmidt	DE	18 July 1862	10 March 1944
1010	Richard Karl Bernhard Schmidt	DE	19 January 1862	13 March 1944
1011	Walter Elmer Schofield	US	9 September 1867	1 March 1944
1012	Roman Karl Scholz	DE	16 January 1912	10 May 1944
1013	Christoph Schrempf	DE	28 April 1860	13 February 1944
1014	Zikmund Schul	DE	11 January 1916	2 June 1944
1016	William Lutley Sclater	UK	23 September 1863	4 July 1944
1017	Frederick George Scott	CA	7 April 1861	19 January 1944
1018	William Joseph Sears	US	4 December 1874	30 March 1944
1019	Mario Segre	It	16 October 1904	24 May 1944
1022	Alexander Shaw, 2nd Baron Craigmyle	UK	28 February 1883	29 September 1944
1026	Lester Burrell Shippee	US	28 January 1879	9 February 1944
1027	Lewis Erle Shore	UK	5 July 1863	27 July 1944
1031	Max Sievers	DE	11 June 1887	17 January 1944
1033	Ruth Hanna Mccormick Simms	US	27 March 1880	31 December 1944
1034	Edgar Simon	US	20 October 1875	13 February 1944
1036	Frederick Slocum	US	6 February 1873	4 December 1944
1037	Rob Roy Slocum	US?	1883	1944
1038	Geza Slovig	Ro	1 September 1897	13 January 1944
1039	Antanas Smetona	Lt/Su?	10 August 1874	9 January 1944
1040	Gov. Alfred Emanuel Smith, aka 'The Happy Warrior', aka 'The Brown Derby'	US	30 December 1873	4 October 1944
1041	Sir Cecil Harcourt Smith	UK	11 September 1859	29 March 1944
1042	Prof David Eugene Smith	US	21 January 1860	29 July 1944
1043	Egbert Watson Smith	US	15 January 1862	25 August 1944
1044	Ellison Durant Smith, aka 'Cotton Ed'	US	1 August 1864	17 November 1944
1045	George Otis Smith	US	22 February 1871	10 January 1944
1049	Dame Ethel Mary Smyth	UK	23 April 1858	8 May 1944
1050	Henry Snell, 1st Baron Snell	UK	1 April 1865	20 April 1944 Or 21
1051	José Narciso Sola	Do	1890	1944
1052	Arthur Herbert Tennyson Somers-Cocks, 6th Baron Somers of Evesham	UK	20 March 1887	14 July 1944
1054	Peter Ernst Ludwig Sonnenburg	DE	23 August 1859	27 May 1944
1056	Joseph Edward Southall	UK	1861	6 November 1944
1057	Hazelton Spencer	US	7 July 1893	28 July 1944
1058	Roger Lancelot Spicer	UK	15 January 1922	31 May 1944
1059	Karl Georg Spitzenberg	DE	5 July 1860	25 January 1944
1060	John Meloy Stahl	US	24 August 1860	17 October 1944
1062	Alfred Stansfield	CA	1871	5 February 1944
1063	George Burt Starr	US	19 August 1854	1944
1065	Frederic Dorr Steele	US	6 August 1873	6 July 1944
1066	Robert Reynolds Steele	UK	30 May 1860	27 March 1944
1067	George Lowther Steer	UK	22 November 1909	25 December 1944
1068	Svetislav Stefanovic	Yu	1874 Or 1877	1944
1072	Florine Stettheimer	US	19 August 1871	11 May 1944
1077	William Kilborne Stewart	US	2 January 1875	6 May 1944
1081	Maria Stonawski, Mrs Scholz	DE	1 December 1861	30 March 1944
1083	Edward Augustine Storer	UK	1882	11 February 1944
1084	George Frederick Stout	UK	6 January 1860	18 August 1944
1085	Percy Selden Straus	US	27 June 1876	6 April 1944
1086	Louise Straus-Ernst	DE	2 December 1893	1944 Jun
1087	J Fletcher Street	US	11 June 1880	18 September 1944
1088	Oliver Day Street	US	6 December 1866	1944
1089	Heinrich Ströbel	DE	7 June 1869	11 January 1944
1090	Thomas Banks Strong	UK	24 October 1861	8 June 1944
1092	Peter Berngardovich Struve	Su	26 January 1870	22 February 1944
1093	Beatrix Marion Sturt née Muirhead	UK	21 November 1849	28 April 1944
1095	Nobumasa Suetsugu	Jp	1880 Jun	1944 Dec C20
1096	Thomas Summers	UK	?	26 July 1944
1097	F A Sutton	UK	14 February 1884	22 October 1944
1098	Jón Stefán Sveinsson	Is	16 November 1857	16 October 1944
1099	Arthur James Tait	UK	8 November 1872	3 April 1944
1102	Ida Minerva Tarbell	US	5 or 15 November 1857	6 January 1944
1103	Giuseppe Tassinari	It	16 December 1891	21 December 1944
1104	James Benjamin Taylor	UK	20 December 1860	24 December 1944
1105	Robert Oswald Patrick Taylor	UK	1873	14 December 1944
1107	Sir Eric Teichman	UK	16 January 1884	3 December 1944
1108	Archbishop William Temple	UK	15 October 1881	26 October 1944
1110	Conrad Engerud Tharaldsen	US	20 May 1884	21 May 1944
1112	John William Thomason, Jr.	US	28 February 1893	12 March 1944
1113	(William) Frank Thompson	UK	17 August 1920	1944 Jun C10
1115	Noel Finley Thompson	US	5 February 1891	1944
1116	William Hale Thompson	US	14 May 1869	19 March 1944
1117	James Thorington	US	6 June 1858	27 October 1944
1119	François Thureau-Dangin	FR	3 January 1872	24 January 1944
1120	James Hugh Thursfield	UK	1869	20 June 1944
1121	Eunice Tietjens née Hammond	US	29 July 1884	6 September 1944
1123	Tokuda Hiroshi, Chikamatsu Shuko	Jp	4 May 1876	23 April 1944
1124	Frank Jerome Tone	US	16 October 1868	26 July 1944
1125	William Whiteman Carlton Topley	UK	1886	21 January 1944
1127	William Edward Tottingham	US	2 November 1881	2 March 1944
1128	Jean Toussaint-Samat	FR	1865	1944
1129	Charles Haskins Townsend	US	29 September 1859	28 January 1944
1130	Mitsuru Toyama	Jp	15 April 1855	4 October 1944
1131	Siegfried Translateur	DE	19 June 1875	1 March 1944
1132	Adam von Trott zu Solz	DE	9 August 1909	26 August 1944
1134	Onésiphore Turgeon	CA	6 September 1849	18 November 1944
1135	Jure Turic	Yu	3 April 1861	9 February 1944
1136	Maurice Joseph Lawson Turnbull	UK	16 March 1906	4 or 5 August 1944
1139	Charles Lakeman Tweedale	UK	1866	29 June 1944
1142	Edward Oscar Ulrich	US	1 February 1857	22 February 1944
1143	Robert Earl Underwood	US	28 March 1872	5 September 1944
1146	Alejandro Urbaneja	Ve	1859	1944
1148	Hendrik Willem Van Loon	NL/US:1919 on	14 January 1882	10 or 11 March 1944
1149	Frederick Van Nuys	US	16 April 1874	25 January 1944
1150	William Kissam Vanderbilt II	US	2 March (or 20 October) 1878	8 January 1944
1151	Henri Vangeon, Henri Ghéon	FR	15 March 1875	1944 Or 1943 Jun 13
1152	William Denham Verschoyle	UK	1868	23 May 1944
1153	Pierre Viénot	FR	5 August 1897	20 July 1944
1155	David Vogel	RU/AT	15 May 1891	1944 Feb
1157	Simon de Vries	NL	4 October 1870	24 March 1944
1159	Karin Alice Wadenström, Mrs Heikel, Katri Vala	Fi	11 September 1901	28 May 1944
1161	Henry Matson Waite	US	15 May 1869	1 September 1944 (wrongly listed 1945)
1162	Alexander James Wall	US	25 October 1884	15 April 1944
1163	Sir Frederick (Joseph) Wall	UK	14 April 1858	25 March 1944
1164	Sir Cuthbert Sidney Wallace, 1st Baronet	UK	1867	24 May 1944
1170	Aucher Warner	UK	1859	21 December 1944
1171	Jacob Warshaw	US?	1878	1944
1172	Robert Watchorn	US?	1858	1944
1173	Sir Sydney (Philip Perigal) Waterlow	UK	22 October 1878	4 December 1944
1175	Nixon Waterman	US	12 November 1859	1 September 1944
1176	Hermann Wätjen	DE	14 February 1876	5 March 1944
1179	Archibald Bertram Webb	UK	4 March 1887	11 June 1944
1180	Arthur Rudolph Berthold Wehnelt	DE	4 April 1871	15 February 1944
1181	Werner Wehrli	Ch	8 January 1892	27 June 1944
1182	Georges Jacques Weill	FR	1865	1944
1183	Irene Weir	US	1862	22 March 1944
1185	Roger Clark Wells	US	24 October 1877	19 April 1944
1186	Rolla Wells	US	1 June 1856	30 November 1944
1187	Thomas Bucklin Wells	US	5 April 1875	28 September 1944
1188	Eleanor Rowland Wembridge	US	9 December 1882	20 February 1944
1189	Herbert John Wenyon	UK	18 April 1888	19 August 1944
1191	Herman Werner	US	1856	1944
1192	Jessie Weston	NZ	1867	1944
1193	Winifred Stephens Whale	UK	?	8 September 1944
1195	Robert W. Whitaker	US	9 September 1863	30 June 1944
1196	Ethel Lina White	UK	1876	13 August 1944
1197	Hervey White	US	1866	20 October 1944
1198	Wilbert Webster White	US	16 January 1863	12 August 1944
1199	William Allen White	US	10 February 1868	29 January 1944 Or 31
1200	William Gillies Whittaker	UK	1876	5 July 1944
1201	Oskar Wiener	DE	4 March 1873	1944 Apr C20
1202	Arthur Herbert Wilde	US	29 April 1865	4 January 1944
1206	Herbert Lockwood Willett	US	5 May 1864	27 March 1944
1207	Blanche Colton Williams	US	10 February 1879	9 August 1944
1209	Edward Huntington Williams	US	1 November 1868	24 June 1944
1210	Edward Thomas Williams	US	17 October 1845	27 January 1944
1211	Margery (Winifred) Williams, Mrs Bianco	UK/US?	22 July 1881	4 September 1944
1212	Mary Wilhelmine Williams	US	14 May 1878	10 March 1944
1213	Bp. Watkin Herbert Williams	UK	22 August 1845	29 November 1944
1214	Rev, Watkin (Wynn) Williams	UK	25 September 1859	22 June 1944
1216	Frederick Ely Williamson	US	14 June 1876	29 September 1944
1219	Joseph Wilpert	DE	22 August 1856	10 March 1944
1223	Margaret Woodrow Wilson	US	16 April 1886	12 February 1944
1225	Stanley Kidder Wilson	US?	1879	1944
1226	Bruno Winawer	Pl	17 March 1883	11 April 1944
1227	Samuel Edward Winbolt	UK	1868	16 February 1944
1229	Christa Winsloe, 1:Baronin Hatvany	DE	23 December 1888	10 June 1944
1231	Judge Robert Watson Winston	US	12 September 1860	14 October 1944
1232	Alice Ames Winter	US	25 November 1865	5 April 1944
1234	Krystyna Wituska	Pl	12 May 1920	26 June 1944
1236	Juliusz Wolfsohn	RU	7 January 1880	12 February 1944
1237	Prof, Richard Woltereck	DE	6 April 1877	23 February 1944
1238	Charles Erskine Scott Wood	US	20 February 1852	22 January 1944
1239	Sir Henry (Joseph) Wood	UK	3 March 1869	19 August 1944
1240	Metcalfe Henry Wood	UK	1864	1944
1243	Ernest Woodhead	UK	10 February 1857	10 June 1944
1244	Sir Arthur Smith Woodward	UK	23 May 1864	2 September 1944
1245	Felix Woyrsch	DE	8 October 1860	20 March 1944
1248	Prof. Mark Robinson Wright	UK	1854	10 October 1944
1249	Kamesaburo Yamashita	Jp	1867 Apr	13 December 1944
1250	Francis (Charles Claypon) Yeats-Brown	UK	15 August 1886	19 December 1944
1251	Arthur Ferdinand Yencken	UK	1 April 1894	18 May 1944
1252	Grace Chisholm Young	UK	1868	29 March 1944
1253	Sir George John Younghusband	UK	9 July 1859	30 September 1944
1263	Prof. Léon Zéliqzon	FR	11 September 1858	16 March 1944

== Entering the public domain in countries with life + 50 years ==
In most countries of Africa and Asia, as well as Belarus, Bolivia, Canada, New Zealand and Uruguay; a work enters the public domain 50 years after the creator's death.

Names	Country	Birth	Death	Occupation	Notable work
Hamilton Basso	USA	5 September 1904	13 May 1964	Writer	The View from Pompey's Head
Brendan Behan	Ireland	9 February 1923	20 March 1964	Writer, playwright, poet	Borstal Boy
Carlos Brandt	Venezuela	11 October 1875	27 February 1964	Writer	
Rachel Carson	USA	27 May 1907	14 April 1964	Environmentalist	Silent Spring
Seán O'Casey	Ireland	30 March 1880	18 September 1964	Playwright	
Flannery O'Connor	USA	25 March 1925	3 August 1964	Writer	
Leah Bodine Drake	USA	22 December 1904	21 November 1964	Poet	
Ian Fleming	United Kingdom	28 May 1908	12 August 1964	Writer	James Bond
Vasily Grossman	Ukraine	12 December 1905	14 September 1964	Writer	
Ben Hecht	USA	28 February 1894	18 April 1964	Screenwriter, novelist	Angels Over Broadway
C. I. Lewis	USA	12 April 1883	3 February 1964	Philosopher	
Grace Metalious	USA	8 September 1924	25 February 1964	Writer	Peyton Place
Dr. Atl	Mexico	3 October 1875	15 August 1964	Painter, writer	
Karl Polanyi	Hungary	25 October 1896	23 April 1964	Economist, politician	The Great Transformation
Mihai Ralea	Romania	1 May 1896	17 August 1964	Writer	
Radu D. Rosetti	Romania	December 1874	November 1964	Poet, playwright	
Edith Sitwell	United Kingdom	7 September 1887	9 December 1964	Poet	
Păstorel Teodoreanu	Romania	30 July 1894	17 March 1964	Poet	
Carl Van Vechten	USA	17 June 1880	21 December 1964	Writer, photographer	Nigger Heaven
Ion Vinea	Romania	17 April 1895	6 July 1964	Poet, novelist	
Anne de Vries	Netherlands	22 May 1904	29 November 1964	Writer	
T. H. White	United Kingdom	29 May 1906	11 January 1964	Writer	The Once and Future King

=== Artists ===
- January 1 – Paul Ninas, American painter (b. 1903)
- January 17 – Đorđe Andrejević Kun, Serbian painter (b. 1904)
- January 26 – Xawery Dunikowski, sculptor (b. 1875)
- February 25 – Alexander Archipenko, sculptor (b. 1887)
- February 27 – Orry-Kelly, costume designer (b. 1897; liver cancer)
- March 12 – Jovan Bijelić, Serbian painter (b. 1884)
- March 28 – Vlastislav Hofman, painter, architect (b. 1884)
- April 4 – Seán O'Sullivan, portrait painter (b. 1906)
- April 20 – August Sander, photographer (b. 1876)
- May 9 – Rico Lebrun, Italian-American painter and sculptor (b. 1900)
- June 18 – Giorgio Morandi, still life painter (b. 1890)
- June 24 – Stuart Davis, painter (b. 1892)
- June 26 – Gerrit Rietveld, designer and architect
- July 21 – Jean Fautrier, painter and sculptor (b. 1898)
- August 31 – Peter Lanyon, landscape painter (b. 1918)
- November 5 – Mabel Lucie Attwell, English illustrator (b. 1879)
- December 29 – Vladimir Favorsky, Russian graphic artist (b. 1886)

== Entering the public domain in the United States ==
The Copyright Term Extension Act means no published works would enter the public domain in this jurisdiction until 2019. Unpublished and unregistered works by authors who died in 1944 entered the public domain on January 1, 2015.

== Worldwide ==
Elon Musk released 100 photographs of his SpaceX-program to the public domain. However in 2019, SpaceX retroactively put copyright restrictions back on the images.

== See also ==
- Creative Commons
- Public Domain Day
- List of countries' copyright lengths
- Public Domain
- 1944 in literature, 1954 in literature, 1964 in literature, and 1974 in literature for writers who died in those years
- Over 300 public domain authors available in Wikisource (any language), with descriptions from Wikidata
