= Ernest Unwin =

Ernest Unwin may refer to:

- Jim Unwin (Ernest James Unwin, 1912–2003), English rugby union player and cricketer
- Ernest Ewart Unwin (1881–1944), Australian Quaker educationist
