= Heinrich Hess =

Heinrich Hess or von Hess etc. may refer to:

- Heinrich Ludwig von Heß (1719–1784), German writer
- Heinrich von Heß (1788–1870), Austrian fieldmarshal
- Heinrich Maria von Hess (1798–1863), German painter
- Heinrich Hess (canoeist) (1928–1993), Saar sprint canoer
- Heinrich Hess (footballer), Swiss footballer
- Heinrich Hess (mountaineer) (1857–1944), Austrian alpinist
