= Adolf Josef Storfer =

Austrian lawyer, journalist and publisher

Adolf Josef Storfer (11 January 1888, Botoşani, Romania – 2 December 1944, Melbourne, Australia) was an educated Austrian lawyer turned journalist and publisher. He belonged to Sigmund Freud's group of friends in Vienna and fled to Australia via Shanghai at the last minute in 1938.
