= Dick Kattenburg =

Dutch composer

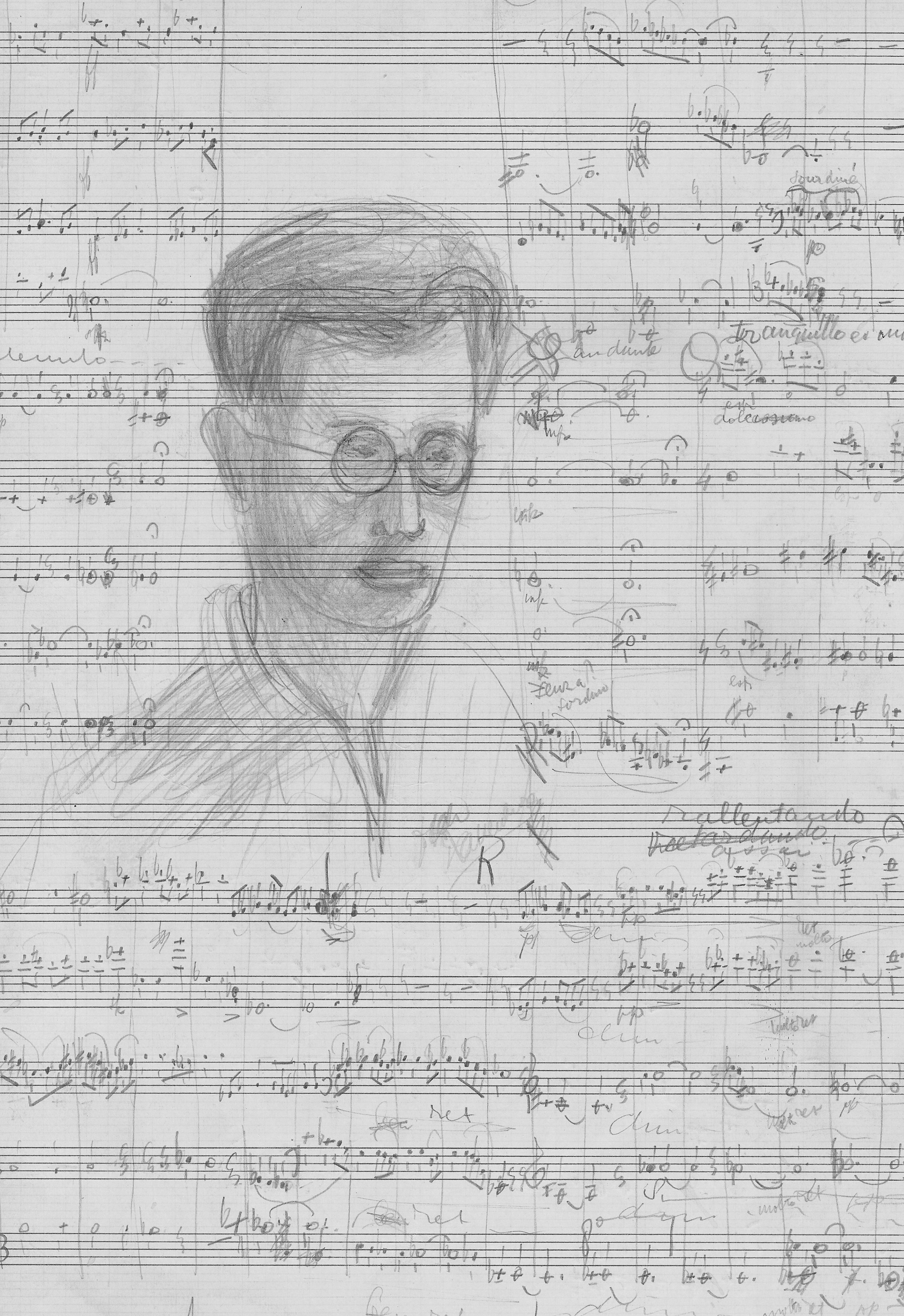

Dick Kattenburg (11 November 1919 in Amsterdam – 30 September 1944 in Auschwitz) was a Dutch Jewish composer who was murdered at Auschwitz at the age of 24. His works have been recovered and recorded.

He was of Jewish descent, grew up in Naarden in the Netherlands and attended the HBS in Bussum. He graduated violin and theory at the College Musical Belge in Antwerp, where he worked with lessons from Hugo Godron. A good friend of that time was a painter and violinist Theo Kroeze. In 1941 he obtained a state diploma of theory and violin in The Hague. He was taught by Leo Smit.

Kattenburg and his family were hiding in Utrecht. On 5 May 1944 he was arrested during a raid. He was then transported to camp Westerbork and sent to Auschwitz between 22 May and 30 September 1944.

He wrote about thirty songs. This included solo pieces and chamber music and orchestral works. He wrote some Jewish and Palestine songs which he called Romanian folk music.

It was thought that there had been preserved only one composition from him. However, in 2004 a family member found a box in the attic with more compositions. In January 2010 his work appeared for the first time on CD performed by the Leo Smit Ensemble under the title of Dick Kattenburg Music.

== Works ==
- Alla Marcia for violin and piano (1941) (first mvmt. of an incomplete sonata)
- Allegro Moderato for viola and piano (1944) (first mvmt. of an incomplete sonata)
- Compositions for piano four-hands (5)
- Escapades -Suite for two violins (1938)
- Flute Sonata (1937)
- Palestinian Songs (7 songs for soprano and piano)
- Piece for flute and piano (1939)
- Quartet for flute, violin, cello and piano (1940, rev. 1943)
- Romanian Melody for Violin, Cello and Piano (1941)
- Sonata, Op. 5
- Tempo di Blues for piano solo (1940)
- Trio a cordes (String Trio)
