= Arthur Fairbanks =

American art historian (1864–1944)

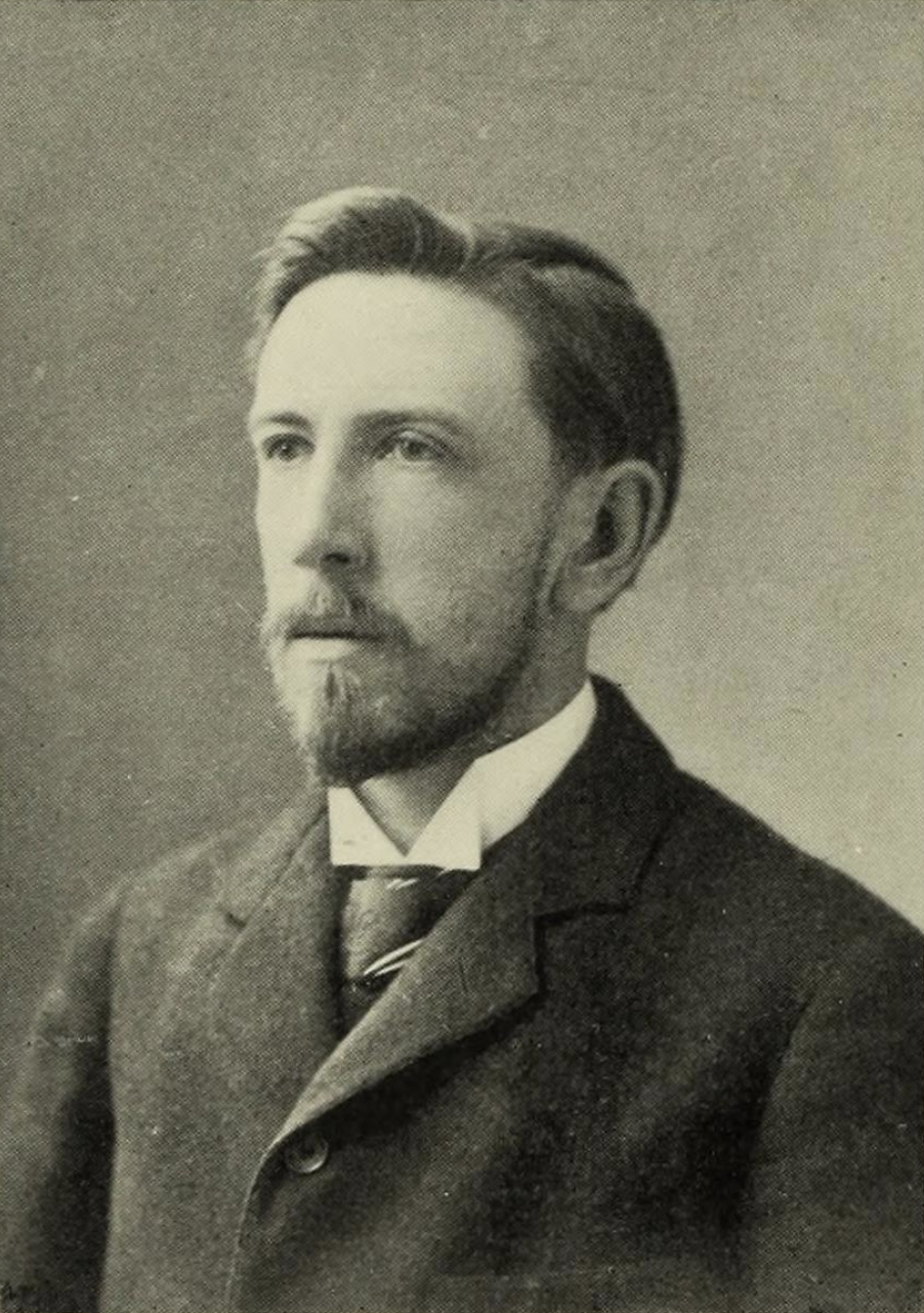
- Born: November 13, 1864; Hanover, New Hampshire, U.S.
- Died: January 13, 1944 (aged 79); Cambridge, Massachusetts, U.S.
- Education: Dartmouth College; Union Theological Seminary; University of Freiburg
- Occupation: Art historian

3rd Director of the Museum of Fine Arts, Boston
- In office 1908–1925
- Preceded by: Edward Robinson
- Succeeded by: Edward Jackson Holmes

Arthur Fairbanks (November 13, 1864 – January 13, 1944) was an American art historian and administrator who lived and worked in the United States. From 1908 to 1925, he was director of the Museum of Fine Arts, Boston.

== Biography ==
Fairbanks was born November 13, 1864, in Hanover, New Hampshire. He graduated from Dartmouth College in 1886 and attended the Yale Divinity School and the Union Theological Seminary. He also studied in Germany, receiving a Ph.D. from the University of Freiburg in 1890. He was on the faculty of Dartmouth College and Yale and Cornell Universities until 1900, when he became professor of Greek literature and archaeology at the University of Iowa. In 1906, he was appointed professor of Greek and Greek archaeology in the University of Michigan. He was appointed curator of classical art at the Boston Museum of Fine Arts in 1907, and in 1908 became director there. He supervised the museum's move to its current Fenway location. He retired in 1925. He was a member of many classical and learned societies. He died January 13, 1944, in Cambridge, Massachusetts.

== Works ==
- The First Philosophers of Greece (1898), London, Kegan Paul, Trench, Trübner & Co. Internet Archive.
- Introduction to Sociology (1901), New York, Chicago, and Boston, Charles Scribner's Sons. Internet Archive.
- Athenian Lekythoi (1907), Boston, Museum of Fine Arts. Internet Archive.
- The Mythology of Greece and Rome (1907), New York, D. Appleton-Century Company. Internet Archive.
- Handbook of Greek Religion (1910), New York, Cincinnati, and Chicago, American Book Company. Internet Archive.
- Greek Gods and Heroes (1915), Boston, Museum of Fine Arts. HathiTrust.

== Notes ==
Attribution
