= William Harmon Norton =

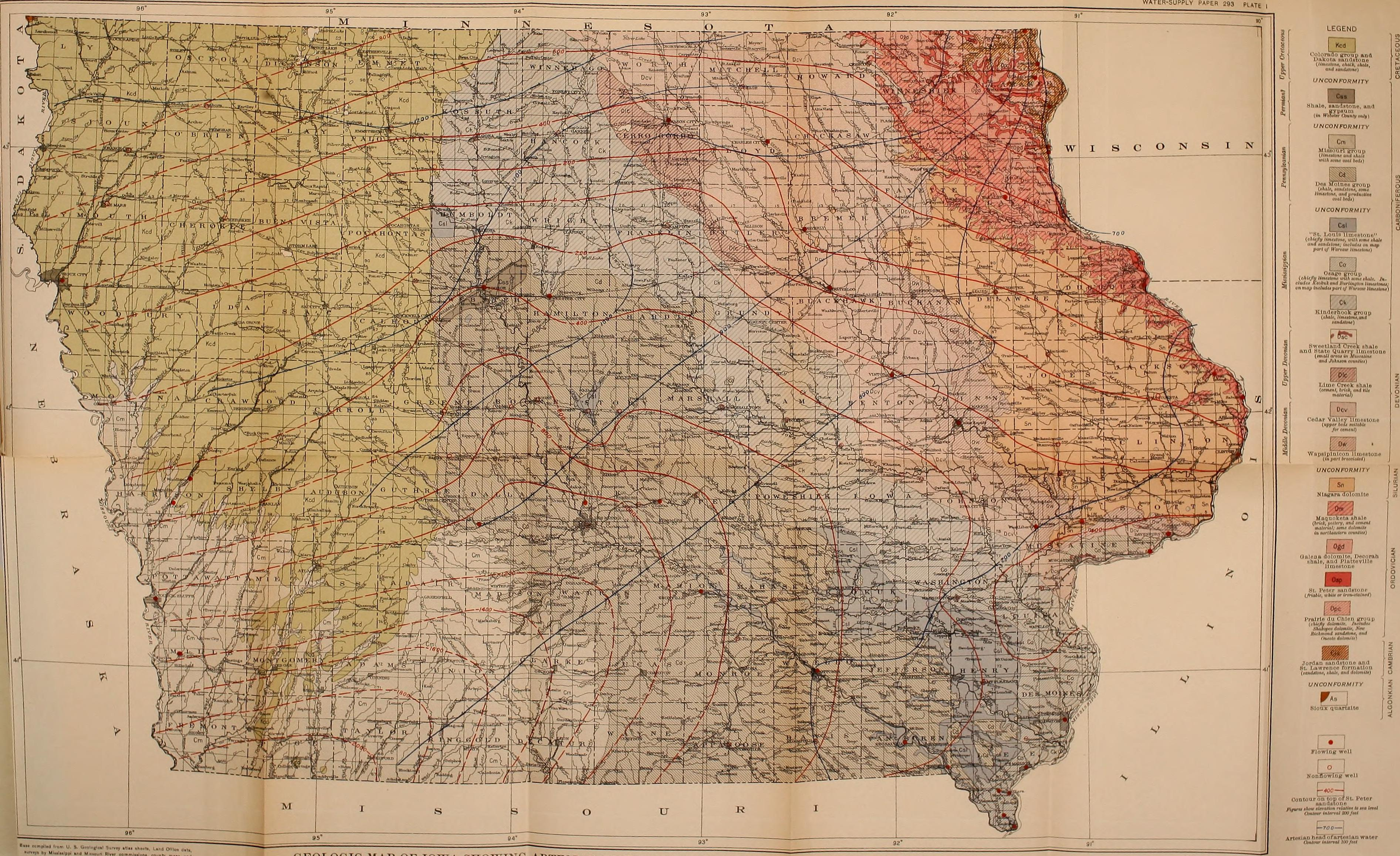
Map from Underground Water Resources of Iowa (1912), co-written by Norton

William Harmon Norton (1856 – 1944 in Mount Vernon) was an American geologist and classicist.

Norton studied at Cornell College and became an academic there. Initially a classicist, he became fascinated with geology and founded the college's geology department. He became professor of Greek and geology in 1881 and of geology alone in 1890 until his retirement in 1924, also working for the United States Geological Survey. He is particularly known for his textbook Elements of Geology.
