= Herbert Hayens =

English novelist and editor

- Born: 1861
- Died: 1944 (aged 82–83)
- Occupations: Writer (novelist), editor
- Spouse: Jeanie Douglas (m. 1933)
- Writing career
- Period: 20th century
- Genre: Children's literature

William James Herbert Hayens (1861 – January 22, 1944) was an English novelist and editor. He was well known for his juvenile fiction and books written for schools.

== Biography ==
Hayens was born in 1861 and lived most of his life in Glasgow, Scotland. In 1933, he married Jeanie Douglas. He worked at Collins & Co. as chief editor. He edited anthologies and was an author of many books written for boys and young adults. Several of his books focused on themes of war and adventure and was compared in style to George Alfred Henty. One reviewer said that Hayens chose settings in out-of-the-way places. His book, A Vanished Nation is an account of the Paraguayan War; A Captain of the Irregulars chronicled the war between Chile and Peru; and Red, White and Green told a story about the Hungarian Revolution of 1848. However, the reviewer criticised Hayens for paying more attention to the subject matter which detracted from the literary cohesion of his novels.

He was once described as, "...of Devonshire seafaring stock, and with his blue eyes, flowing moustache and greying hair looked more like an old-time Devonshire sea captain than an editor".

== Works ==
Hayens published both fiction and non-fiction. Almost all his books were targeted towards young boys and teenagers. His non-fiction books were used in schools.

- Under the Lone Star: A Story of Revolution in Nicaragua, fiction, 1896
- Paris at Bay: A Story of the Siege, fiction, 1897
- Clevely Sahib: A Tale of the Khyber Pass, fiction, 1897
- Soldiers of the Legion: A Tale of the Carlist War, fiction, 1898
- An Emperor's Doom; or The Patriots of Mexico, fiction, 1898
- In the Grip of the Spaniard, fiction, 1899
- A Fighter in Green: A Tale of Algeria, fiction, 1899
- A Captain of Irregulars, fiction, 1900
- A Vanished Nation, fiction, 1900
- One of the Red Shirts: A Story of Garibaldi's Men, fiction, 1901
- The Red, White, and Green, fiction, 1901
- Ye Mariners of England: A Boy's Book of the Navy, non-fiction, 1901
- For the Colours: A Boy's Book of the Army, non-fiction, 1902
- Scouting for Buller, fiction, 1902
- A Mystery of the Sea, fiction, 1903
- Jack Fraser's Adventures, fiction, 1903
- At the Point of the Sword: A Story for Boys, fiction, 1903
- The President's Scouts: A Story of the Chilian Revolution, fiction, 1904
- The Prince Edward Readers, edited, 1904
- My Sword's My Fortune: A Story of Old France, fiction, 1904
- Two Old Sea-Dogs: Drake and Blake, fiction, 1904
- The Gayton Scholarship: A School Story, fiction, 1904
- With Sword and Ship, fiction, 1906
- The Story of Europe, non-fiction, 1907
- Stirring and True, non-fiction, 1907
- Famous Fights, non-fiction, 1907
- For the Colours, non-fiction, 1908
- Ye Mariners of England, non-fiction, 1908
- The Bravest Gentleman in France:...In the Days of Louis XIII, fiction, 1908
- The Red Caps of Lyons: A Story of the French Revolution, fiction, 1909
- The Making of the Homeland, non-fiction, 1909
- The British Legion: A Tale of the Carlist War, fiction, 1910
- For Rupert and the King, fiction, 1910
- Beset by Savages, fiction, 1910
- An Amazing Conspiracy, fiction, 1914
- Teuton Versus Slav: The Peoples of the War, non-fiction, 1914
- The Forward Adventure Book, edited, 1916
- Britain's Glory on Land and Sea, non-fiction, 1916
- 'Midst Shot and Shell in Flanders, fiction, 1916
- The Victory Adventure Book, edited, 1916
- From Anzac to Buckingham Palace: A Tale of the V.C., fiction, 1917
- The Triumph Adventure Book, edited, 1917
- Lords of the Air, non-fiction, 1918
- The Dreadnought Adventure Book, edited, 1918
- Wanderings in Wonderland, edited, 1918
- Bunty's Best Book, edited, 1918
- Our Island Heroes, edited, non-fiction, 1918
- The 'Play Up' Series, non-fiction, 1919
- The Mystery of the Amazon, non-fiction, 1919
- A Kidnapped Prince, fiction, 1919
- Under Haig and Foch, non-fiction, 1919
- The Imperial Adventure Book, edited, 1919
- The Gayton Scholarship, fiction, 1920
- The Sultan's Emerald, fiction, 1920
- Young Hearts, short stories, 1920
- The Standard Adventure Book, edited, 1920
- The Garden of Literature, edited, 1920
- Golden Spurs, edited, 1920
- Bunty's Bonny Book, edited, 1922
- The Pelt and Rifle Adventure Book, edited, 1922
- Children of Other Times, non-fiction, 1922
- Bunty's Story Book, edited, 1922
- The Camp-Fire Adventure Book, edited, 1922
- The Honour of a Royall, fiction, 1923
- A Little Book of Historical Fiction, edited, short stories, 1924
- A Little Book of Historical Poetry, edited, poetry, 1924
- A Book of Verse, edited, poetry, 1924
- In the Days of the Knights, non-fiction, 1924
- Selected English Letters, edited, biography, 1924
- Poems and Ballads, edited, poetry, 1924
- New World School Series, edited, 1924
- Selected English Essays, edited, 1925
- Readings from the Naturalists, edited, 1925
- Play Up, Buffs!, school stories, 1926
- Play Up, Blues!, school stories, 1926
- Play Up, Kings!, school stories, 1926
- Play Up, Queens!, school stories, 1927
- Play Up, Swifts!, school stories, 1927
- Play Up, Royals!, school stories
- Play Up, Magpies!, school stories
- Play Up, Greys!, school stories
- Play Up! Omnibus for Boys, short stories, 1928
- The Secret of the Vault, short stories, 1929
- Aces of the Air, non-fiction, 1930
- The Mascot, short stories, 1930
- The Heart-Shaped Ruby, fiction, 1930
- Jack, The Merrymaker, fiction, 1930
- The Priory Mystery, fiction, 1931
- Pirates and Adventurers, non-fiction, 1931
- The Captain of Queens, fiction, 1932
- Happy Days at Cheverill, fiction, 1932
- A History of English Literature for Schools, non-fiction, 1932
- The Treasure Hunt, fiction, 1932
- The New Captain, school story, fiction, 1932
- The Outlaw's Stronghold, fiction, 1933
