= Arthur Keith (geologist) =

American geologist

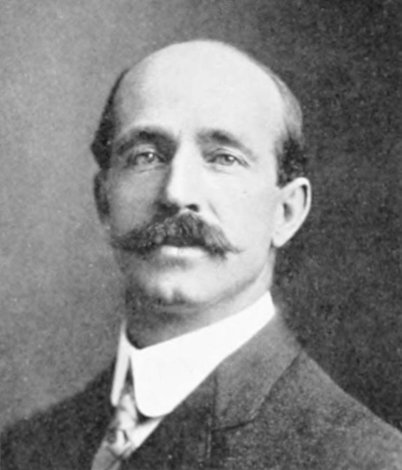
- Born: September 30, 1864; St. Louis, Missouri
- Died: February 7, 1944 (aged 79); Washington, D.C.
- Education: Harvard
- Spouse: Elizabeth Mary Smith (m. 1916; died 1942)
- Awards: National Academy of Sciences
- Scientific career
- Fields: Geology

Arthur Keith (September 30, 1864 – February 7, 1944) was an American geologist, who spent nearly 50 years in doing field studies involving mapping and describing the geological features of the Appalachians from the Carolinas to Maine.

== Biography ==
Arthur Keith was born in St. Louis, Missouri, on September 30, 1864. He grew up in Quincy, Massachusetts, where he attended public school until he was 12 years old. After preparatory school at Adams Academy, he matriculated in 1881 at Harvard University. He graduated there with bachelor's degree in 1885 and A.M. in 1887. He was a student of Nathaniel Shaler.

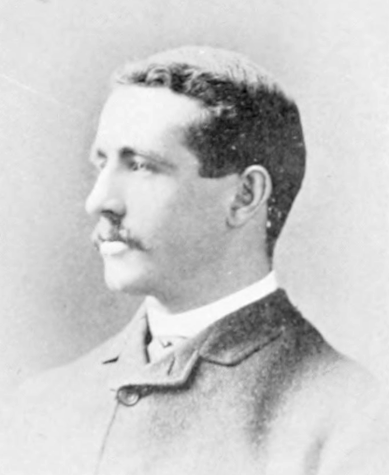
At Harvard, c. 1885

In 1887 Keith started work with the Massachusetts Topographic Survey. In the summer of that year he became assistant in a field party of the United States Geological Survey (USGS) and mapped areas in mountainous eastern Tennessee. At the end of the summer he went to Washington, D.C., and became a regular member of the USGS. He was assigned to Tennessee as field assistant to Bailey Willis, who was the director of the Appalachian Division. In 1889 Keith was elected a member of the Geological Society of America. His maps published between 1891 and 1907 gave detailed description of 15,000 square miles with much intricate bedrock structure. In 1906 he became chief of the Section of Areal Geology for all of the US. In 1913 the Section of Area Geology was divided was made into Eastern and Western Areas, with Keith in charge of the Eastern Area.

During World War I, he began a special study, requested by the US Army, in Maine, New Hampshire, and Vermont of geological features with possible military importance. In 1924 he withdrew from administrative work to work on the complex geology of northwestern Vermont and a geological map of Maine.

Keith was elected in 1928 a member of the National Academy of Sciences. He was in 1914 president of the Geological Society of Washington, in 1927 president of the Geological Society of America, from 1928 to 1931 chair of the Division of Geology and Geography of the National Research Council, and from 1931 to 1942 treasurer of the National Academy of Sciences.

In 1930 he went to Paris as a delegate of the National Academy of Sciences and the Geological Society of America, for the Centennial of the Geological Society of France. On the same journey to Europe he represented the National Academy at the meeting in Stockholm of the International Union of Geodesy and Geophysics.

In 1922, at a symposium, sponsored by the Geological Society of America, he gave his ideas on the structure and history of mountain belts and the causes for their development.

Keith's contribution gives a valuable over-all picture of the Appalachians, and presents a speculation that deformation of the geosynclinal belt was caused by pressure from the Atlantic floor against the continental margin, with intrusion of igneous masses playing an important part. In his presidential address to the Geological Society of America in 1927 this general thesis was extended to the structural history of all North America. In that address he gave critical attention also to the hypothesis of continental drift, interest in which was at that time strong because an English translation of Wegener's book had appeared a short time before.

In 1916 he married Elizabeth Mary Smith, who died in 1942. They had no children.

Arthur Keith died in Washington, D.C., on February 7, 1944.

== Selected publications ==
- Geiger, H. R.; Keith, A. (1891). "The Structure of the Blue Ridge Near Harper's Ferry". Geological Society of America Bulletin. 2 (1): 155–164. Bibcode:1891GSAB....2..155G. doi:10.1130/GSAB-2-155. ISSN 0016-7606.
- Keith, Arthur (1895). Geology of the Catoctin Belt. U.S. Government Printing Office.
- Keith, Arthur (1904). Description of the Asheville Quadrangle. North Carolina-Tennessee: US Geological Survey Geology Atlas Folio 116 (PDF).
- Katz, Frank J.; Keith, Arthur (1917). The Newington moraine. Maine, New Hampshire, and Massachusetts: US Geological Survey Professional Paper (PDF). pp. 11–29.
- Keith, Arthur; Sterrett, D. B. (1918). "Contributions to economic geology, 1917, Part I, Metals and nonmetals except fuels--Tin resources of the Kings Mountain district, North Carolina and South Carolina. No. 660-D". doi:10.3133/b660D.
- Keith, A. (1923). "Outlines of Appalachian Structure". Geological Society of America Bulletin. 34 (2): 309–380. Bibcode:1923GSAB...34..309K. doi:10.1130/GSAB-34-309. ISSN 0016-7606.
- Keith, A. (1928). "Structural Symmetry in North America". Geological Society of America Bulletin. 39 (1): 321–386. Bibcode:1928GSAB...39..321K. doi:10.1130/GSAB-39-321. ISSN 0016-7606.
