= Iosif Utkin =

Russian poet

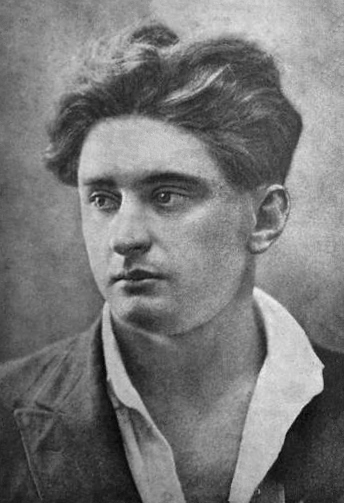
- Utkin, c. 1929
- Born: May 27, 1903; Khingan station, China (now Yakeshi, Inner Mongolia)
- Died: November 13, 1944 (aged 41); Moscow Oblast

Iosif Pavlovich Utkin (Russian: Ио́сиф Па́влович У́ткин) (27 May [O.S. 14 May] 1903 – 13 November 1944) was a Russian poet of the World War II generation.

Utkin was born on 13 May at the Khingan station (in modern Yakeshi) of the Chinese Eastern Railway, which his parents were helping to construct. After his birth the family returned to their native city Irkutsk, where the future poet lived until 1920. He was expelled from middle school for poor behavior and free-thinking. He worked as a marker at a tannery, sold newspapers, and delivered telegrams for a living. In 1919 during the anti-Kolchak uprising in Irkutsk he became a member of the Workers Guard (Communist guerrillas) until the re-establishment of Soviet power. In 1920 he enlisted as a volunteer with the first group of Irkutsk Komsomol members for the Soviet Far East Front. In the army he was a field informant and military commissar of repair shops.

In 1922 he worked as a reporter for the newspaper Power to Labor, then for the Provincial Committee of Komsomol as a secretary of the Komsomol newspaper and a political instructor for pre-induction trainees. In 1924 he was sent to study at the Institute for Journalism in Moscow. Since 1922 he had published his poems in the Siberian press, and on his arrival in Moscow he was published there. In 1925 his first book "Story about the redhead Motele..." (Russian: Повесть о рыжем Мотэле...) was published, and in 1926 his first book of poems. From 1925 he worked in Komsomolskaya Pravda. After graduating from the Institute in 1927, he was sent along with the poets Zharov and Bezymensky abroad, where he stayed two months. In 1928 he published the poem "Dear Childhood."

At the beginning of the German-Soviet War, he went to the front. Near Bryansk, he was injured, and he was treated in Tashkent. There he wrote the book I saw it myself, verses from which he read to the editorial staff of Komsomolskaya Pravda. In spite of the opinions of his physicians he returned to the front, although he had lost four fingers on his right hand. He participated in combat and wrote march songs. Many of his verses became songs and were popular at the front. Returning from the front on 13 November 1944, Utkin perished in an airplane crash.
