= James Bissett Pratt =

American philosopher, theologian and Behaviorist

James Bissett Pratt (June 22, 1875 – January 15, 1944) held the Mark Hopkins Chair of Intellectual and Moral Philosophy at Williams College. He was president of the American Theological Society from 1934 to 1935.

Born in Elmira, New York, Pratt was the only child of Daniel Ransom Pratt and Katharine Graham Murdoch. He had an early appreciation of being read to by his mother, and particularly admired the idealism of Ralph Waldo Emerson in his youth. Pratt graduated from Elmira Free Academy in 1893, then attended Williams College, graduating in 1898.

He subsequently studied at the University of Berlin and at Harvard University, earning his doctorate through his mentor William James in 1905. He returned to Williams to teach and write on philosophy thereafter. Pratt began teaching at Williams College in 1905 as Instructor of Philosophy. In 1906, he was promoted to Assistant Professor.

In 1910, Pratt traveled to Chicago, where he met his future wife, Catherine Mariotti. They traveled to Italy in 1911 and were married. In 1917, Pratt was named the Mark Hopkins Chair of Intellectual and Moral Philosophy. He took a sabbatical in 1923, travelling in the Far East and teaching at the Chinese Christian University in Peking. Pratt retired in 1943 and received an honorary L.H.D. from Williams College. He died on January 15, 1944.

== Writings ==
- The Psychology of Religious Belief, 1907
- What Is Pragmatism? 1909
- India and Its Faiths, 1915
- Democracy and Peace, 1916
- Essays in Critical Realism, 1920 (collection of essays with one essay Critical Realism and the Possibility of Knowledge by Pratt)
- The Religious Consciousness: A Psychological Study, 1920
- Matter and Spirit, 1922
- Behaviorism and consciousness, 1922
- The Pilgrimage of Buddhism, 1928
- Reason in the Art of Living, 1949
- Eternal Values of Religion, 1950
