= Herbert Wenyon =

English cricketer

Herbert John Wenyon (18 April 1888 – 19 August 1944) was an English first-class cricketer active 1921–24 who played for Middlesex. He was born in Canton, China; died in Northwood.
