= Philip Max Raskin =

Russian-born poet (1880–1944)

Philip Max Raskin (December 24, 1880 – February 6, 1944) was a Belarusian-born poet.

== Life ==
Raskin was born on December 24, 1880, in Shklov, in today Belarus. After emigrating to England, he worked at the Leeds Health Department. In 1914, he published his first poetry collection, Songs of a Jew, and the following year, he immigrated to the United States. He continued to publish his own poetry in English, Hebrew, and Yiddish, as well as an anthology of modern Jewish poetry. He immigrated to the United States in 1915 and died on February 6, 1944, in New York City.

== Works ==
- Songs of a Wanderer, George Routledge & Sons, ISBN 9781103062577
- Anthology of Modern Jewish Poetry, Behrman's Jewish Book Shop, 1927
