= Philip Mechanicus =

Dutch journalist

Philip Mechanicus, born April 17, 1889, in Amsterdam and died in October 1944 in the Auschwitz concentration camp, was a Dutch journalist and diarist.

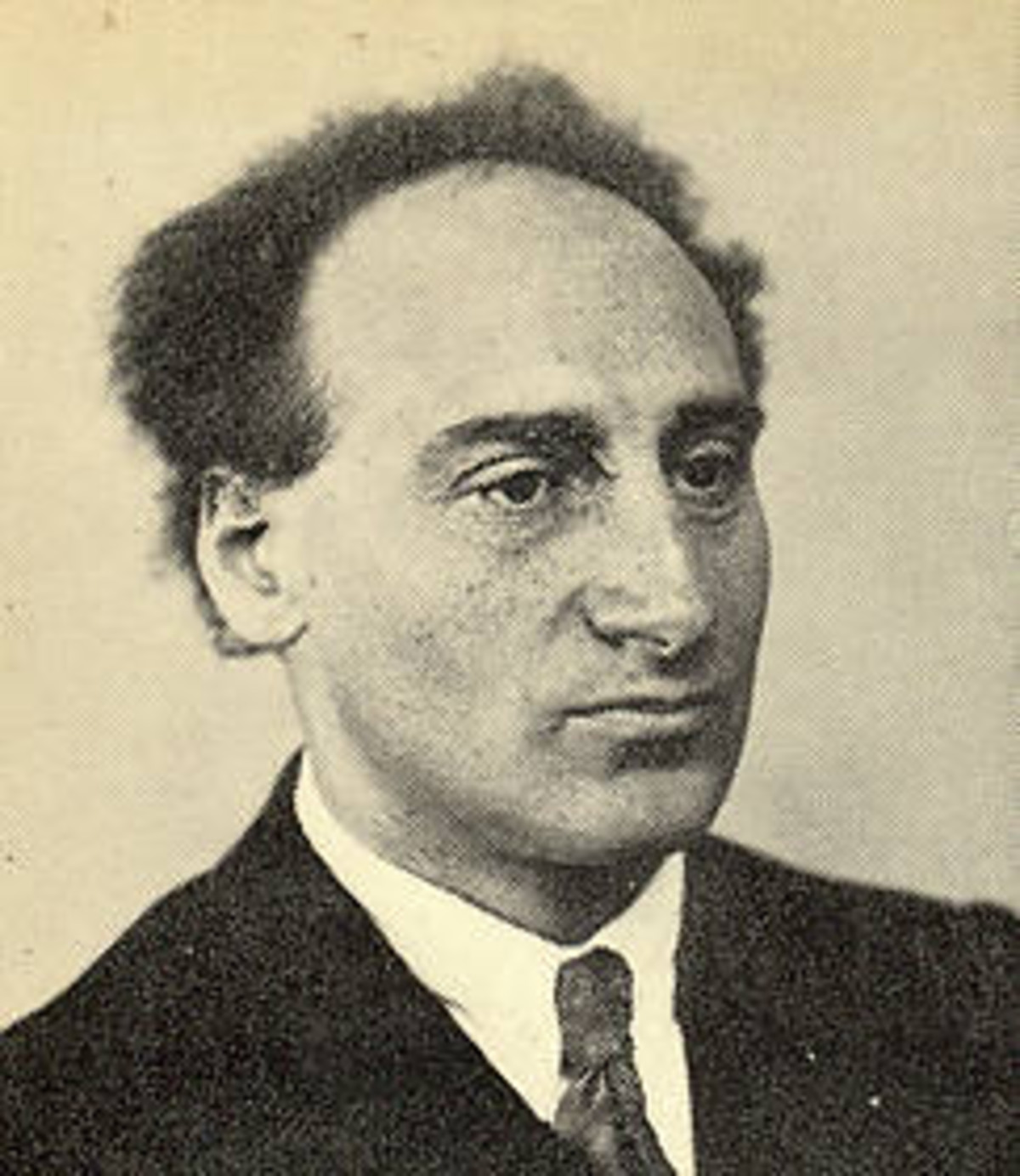
Philip Mechanicus in late 1930s.

== Bibliography ==
- Renata Laqueur: Schreiben im KZ. Tagebücher 1940–1945 Bearbeitet von Martina Dreisbach und mit einem Geleitwort von Rolf Wernstedt, Donat-Verlag, Bremen 1992, Zugl.: New York, Univ., Diss., ISBN 3-924444-09-9, pp. 130.
- Koert Broersma: Buigen onder de storm. Levensschets van Philip Mechanicus 1889-1944, Van Gennep, Amsterdam 1993. ISBN 90-6012-969-5 2019, ISBN 9789023256236.
- Mechanicus, Philip, In Depot, Polak & Vangennep, 1964, one of the first camp diaries to be released after the war. the Diary Keepers, Nina Siegal, ecco/Harper Collins, NY, 2023.P.331-2

Translated into English by Irene Gibbons as Waiting for Death in 1968.
