= József Balogh (philologist) =

József Balogh (12 June 1893 – 2 April (?) 1944) was a Hungarian publicist, philologist, and literary historian.

== Biography ==
József Balogh's original family name was Blum. It was due to his father Ármin, the history and literature teacher at the Rabbinical Seminary of Budapest, that he adopted the Hungarian name, Balogh. It was Ármin's connection to the Kornfeld financial family that led Balogh to build an intimate friendship with his future patron Móric Kornfeld, a son-in-law of the industrialist Manfréd Weiss. Both Balogh and Kornfeld converted to Roman Catholicism.

Balogh's main contribution was the creation of The Hungarian Quarterly.

== Works ==
- Vasa lecta et pretiosa: Szent Ágoston konfessziói, egy stílustörténeti tanulmány vázlata (1918)
- Voces Paginarum: Beiträge zur Geschichte des lauten Lesens und Schreibens (1927)
- A klasszikus műveltségért (1934)
