= Ian Macpherson (novelist) =

Scottish writer

- Born: 1905
- Died: 1944 (aged 38–39)
- Education: Aberdeen University
- Occupation: writer
- Notable work: Shepherds Calendar, Wild Harbour

Ian Macpherson (1905–1944) was a Scottish writer from Leslie Place, Forres, Moray, Scotland. He graduated from Aberdeen University in 1928 with a first-class honours degree in English. His first novel, Shepherds Calendar, was published in 1931. The book depicts a young man's growth to maturity in a farming community dominated by hard toil and the influence of the seasons.

Wild Harbour, published in 1936, tells of the world destroyed by a future war, forebodings of which were already discernible in Europe. Macpherson died in a motorcycle accident in 1944.

== Novels ==
- Shepherds' Calendar (1931), ISBN 9780862280635
- Land of Our Fathers (1933)
- Pride in the Valley (1936), ASIN B000ZLQB7K
- Wild Harbour (1936), ISBN 9780862412340
