= José André =

Argentinian composer

José André (born January 17, 1881, in Buenos Aires; died July 13, 1944, there) was an Argentine composer and music critic.

André was a student of Alberto Williams and Julián Aguirre and completed his education between 1911 and 1914 at the Schola Cantorum in Paris. In 1915 he founded the National Society of Music, later the Argentine Association of Composers. He composed mainly chamber music works and songs, as well as some orchestral works and the cantata "Santa Rosa de Lima".
