= Nixon Waterman =

American journalist (1859–1944)

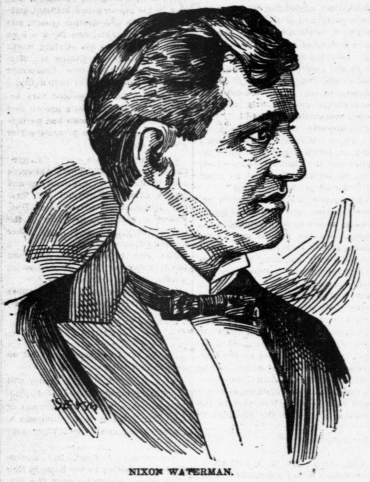
Nixon Waterman, from The Broad Ax published on June 16, 1900

Nixon Waterman (12 November 1859 – 1 September 1944) was an American newspaper writer, poet and Chautauqua lecturer from Newark, Kendall County, Illinois, who rose to prominence in the 1890s.

Born in Newark, New Jersey, Waterman was raised in Creston, Iowa, where he was introduced to journalism working on a small weekly paper. He thereafter worked for various times for newspapers in Denver, Omaha, Chicago, and Boston.

He began writing poems and essays, which "were popular with magazine and newspaper readers across the country", and "collaborated with Opie Read on some of that humorist's best known works".

Waterman "died at his Fair Acres farm" in Canton, Norfolk County, Massachusetts, following a brief illness, at the age of 84.
