= Virginio Gayda =

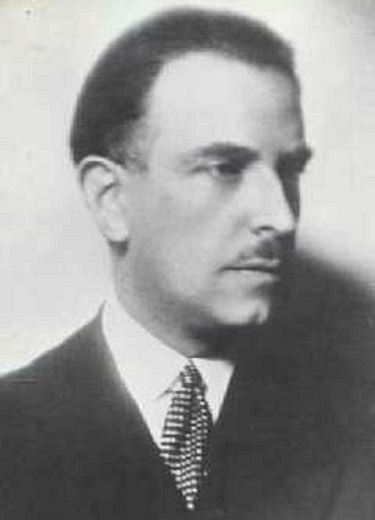
Virginio Gayda

Virginio Gayda (12 August 1885 – 14 March 1944) was a prominent Italian fascist journalist during Fascist Italy, led by Benito Mussolini.

== Early life ==
Gayda was born in Rome, studied economics at the University of Turin and began his career as a journalist when he was hired as a foreign correspondent by La Stampa in 1908.

== Journalist ==
Gayda came to prominence as editor of Il Giornale d'Italia during the 1930s and the 1940s. Contemporary reports in the Allied press characterised him as a propagandist who was willing to write anything to support Benito Mussolini's regime.

Dr. Seuss lampooned Gayda by saying, "If you were to ask me, which you haven't, whom I consider the world's most outstanding writer of fantasy, I would, of course, answer: 'I am.' My second choice, however, is Virginio Gayda."

However, Gayda twice came into conflict with Mussolini. In the first incident, a 1939 article "Che farà l'Italia?" ("What Will Italy Do?") was written when Germany invaded Poland in which Gayda cast doubt on the wisdom of Italy entering the world war on the side of Germany. Mussolini, who planned to join the war, criticised the article strongly.

Mussolini raised no public objection when Gayda warned against the likelihood of a swift victory one week after start in June 1941 of the Axis invasion of the Soviet Union. However, on 17 February 1943, Gayda provoked the second incident by stating in Il Giornale d'Italia that the Axis powers had difficulties in the war of attrition. Since the Allies were understood to have more industrial power than the Axis, that was seen as a tacit admission of a likely defeat. As a result, Gayda did not appear in Il Giornale d'Italia again until 23 March. He was replaced as editor of Il Giornale d'Italia by A. Bergamini after the fall of the fascist regime on 25 July 1943.

== Death ==
He was killed by Allied bombing at home on 14 March 1944, reportedly while he was studying English, "the language of Churchill and Eisenhower", in preparation for the arrival of the Allies.
