= Tokio Takeuchi =

Japanese physicist

Tokio Takeuchi (Japanese: 竹内 時男, Hepburn: Takeuchi Tokio; 26 October 1894 – 24 April 1944) was a Japanese physicist.

== Life ==
Tokio Takeuchi was born on 26 October 1894 in Kanazawa city. After graduating from the physics department of the Tokyo Imperial University in 1918, he started teaching at the Tokyo Higher Technical School (ja) (the origin of Tokyo Institute of Technology) in 1919, holding a short career as an engineer at Mitsubishi Shipbuilding (ja) (the origin of Mitsubishi Heavy Industries), and later in 1932 became assistant professor at the Tokyo Institute of Technology. From 1928 to 1930 he visited Europe for research; in France he studied quantum mechanics under the supervision of Louis de Broglie. On 24 April 1944, he died in Tokyo due to vertebral osteolysis.

== Work ==
=== Physical cosmology ===
Takeuchi studied general relativistic cosmology in the 1930s, which include the interpretation of the Hubble-Lemaître law as a consequence of the varying-speed-of-light hypothesis, and construction of an eternally oscillating cosmological model that has no initial singularity. These papers had attracted little attention for more than 70 years until being discovered by a Danish historian of science Helge Kragh.
