= Young Moshe's Diary =

Diary of a Jewish youth during World War 2

Moshe Ze'ev Flinker (Maurice Wolf Flinker) was a Jewish youth born in The Hague on October 9, 1926 and killed in Bergen Belsen by the Nazi regime in 1944. He was the son of Eliezer Noah Flinker of Poland, who had migrated to the Netherlands and subsequently become a wealthy businessman. Following the 1940 Battle of the Netherlands, the family left The Hague for Belgium to evade Nazi rule and the rounding up of Jews by the Gestapo. The Flinkers stayed in Brussels, Belgium until their arrest in 1944, whereupon Moshe and his parents were deported to Auschwitz. Together with his father, Moshe was relocated first to KZ Echterdingen, and then to Bergen-Belsen, where they both died in January 1945.

Flinker began writing a diary in 1941. The diary was saved by his siblings and published in Hebrew by Yad Vashem in 1958. An English translation was published by Yad Vashem in 1965, titled Young Moshe's Diary, subtitled The spiritual torment of a Jewish boy in Nazi Europe; a second edition followed in 1971. A Yiddish translation was published by Perets, Tel Aviv in 1965, titled Dos yingl Moyshe: Dos togbukh fun Moyshe Flinker. A German translation was published in 2008 under the title Auch wenn ich hoffe: Das Tagebuch des Moshe Flinker by Berlin University Press.
