= John Wight Duff =

Scottish academic (1866–1944)

John Wight Duff, FBA (1866–1944), often abbreviated as J. Wight Duff, was a Scottish classicist and academic. He was Professor of Classics at Armstrong College, Durham from 1898 to 1933.

== Education ==
Born in Dundee on 4 September 1866, Duff was the son of an iron founder, William Duff and his wife, Sarah Fergusson Wight. His grandfather was a well-known brass founder and Provost of Greenock, where the family had a connection with James Watt, the engineer. John attended Aberdeen Grammar School, winning gold medals each year he was at the school and leaving as Latin dux in 1882. He then read classics at the University of Aberdeen, graduating with first-class honours in 1886 and winning the Simpson Prize for best graduate in Ancient Greek. He then completed a classics degree at Pembroke College, Oxford, with an open scholarship, graduating with first-class honours in 1890.

== Career ==
Duff was appointed an assistant professor of Greek at the University of Aberdeen in 1891, and then moved to Durham College of Science (later reformed as Armstrong College, Durham) in 1893 to be Professor of Classics and English. Five years later, the chair was split and he was appointed Professor of Classics, serving until he retired in 1933. During this period, he edited Samuel Johnson's Lives of Milton and Addison (1900) and produced a collection of Lord Byron's poetry (1904). He authored A Literary History of Rome in 1909 and produced an updated edition the next year; this was followed by Writers of Rome (1923) and A Literary History of Rome in the Silver Age (1927). He was also Vice-Principal of Armstrong College in 1918, and from 1921 to 1924 and then again from 1926 to 1933.

Duff received an honorary DLitt degree from Durham University in 1910, and received DLitt degrees from the University of Oxford and the University of Aberdeen in 1911, the former in recognition of his Literary History of Rome (1909). He was elected a Fellow of the British Academy in 1930.

== Later life ==
In retirement, Duff continued to write; with Arnold Mackay Duff (his son [1900-1976]), he produced Minor Latin Poets: With Introductions and English Translations in 1934 and two years later completed Roman Satire: Its Outlook on Social Life (published by Cambridge University Press). He died on 8 December 1944, aged 78.
