= Mirza Gelovani =

Georgian poet (1917–1944)

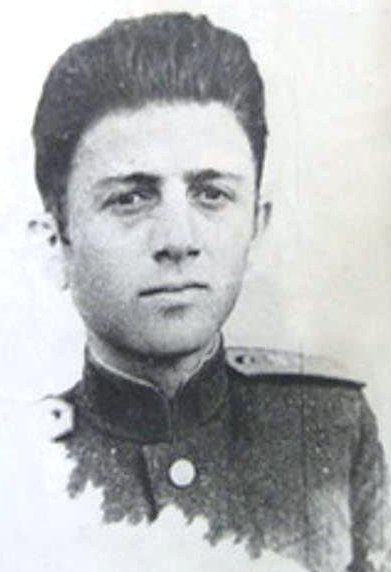
Mirza Gelovani

Mirza Gelovani (Georgian: მირზა გელოვანი) (March 2, 1917 – July 1944) was a Georgian poet who died, fighting in the Soviet ranks during World War II at the age of 27.

Gelovani, with his poetry full of childlike admiration of nature, attracted attention at the age of 16, but it was only after his death that most of his poems were published and made him into one of the best loved poets of Georgia's younger generation. Most of his wartime poems are patriotic heroics, sometimes transcending the horrors of war with a naïve enjoyment. Mirza Gelovani was killed during the crossing of the Western Dvina River in Belarus. He was posthumously awarded the Shota Rustaveli State Prize in 1975.
