= Heinrich Hess (mountaineer) =

Austrian alpinist and author

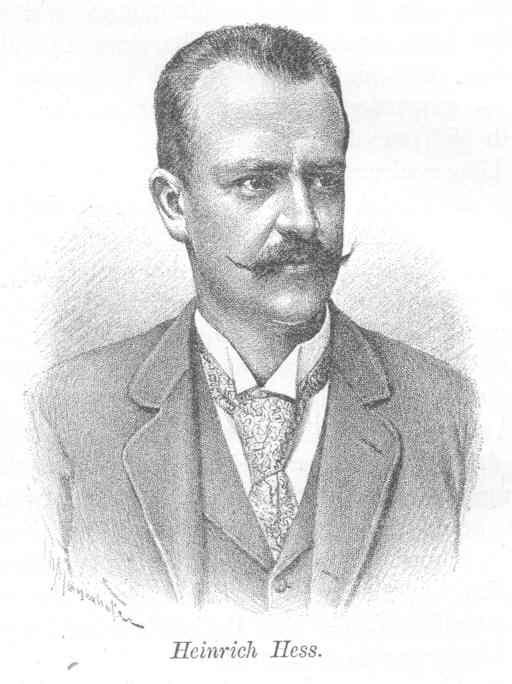

Heinrich Hess (December 29, 1857 in Vienna – March 7, 1944 in Vienna) was an Austrian alpinist, author of guidebooks on mountain geography and is the first person to survey the Gesäuse mountain range of the Northern Limestone Alps.

== Life ==
Hess became famous as the first person to publish guide books on the Gesäuse mountain region after his visit in 1884. However in the 7th edition, Eduard Pichl was added as a co-author.

The alpine club hut, Hesshütte, is named after him.

== Publications ==
- Der Hochtourist in den Ostalpen, an eight-volume work co-authored with Ludwig Purtscheller.
