= Ernest Ewart Unwin =

Australian educationist (1881–1944)

- Born: 13 July 1881; Folkestone, Kent, England
- Died: 20 September 1944 (aged 63); Tasmania, Australia
- Occupation: educationist
- Parents: Uriah John Unwin; Sophia Jane

Ernest Ewart Unwin (13 July 1881 – 20 September 1944) was an Australian Quaker educationist. Born in England, he held a variety of positions in several Quaker schools before lecturing at the University of Leeds, his alma mater. A conscientious objector during World War I, he emigrated to Australia in 1923 to headmaster a school in Hobart. After enlisting the financial assistance of Quaker organisations in the area, Unwin oversaw great expansion of the Tasmanian education system, creating and serving on several Boards of Education at local and state level for both community schools and the University of Tasmania.

== Career ==
Unwin was born in Folkestone, Kent in 1881 to father Uriah John Unwin, a bricklayer, and his wife Sophia Jane, née Martin. He was educated at the Quaker schools of Saffron Walden and Ackworth, before graduating from the University of Leeds in 1901. He immediately returned to teach at Ackworth between 1901 and 1904, before becoming a science lecturer at Leeds University in 1908. In April 1910 he was married to his fiancé, Ursula Dymond Thorp. They moved to York in 1912, where Unwin taught at Bootham School followed by a Quaker school in Leighton Park. He published his first book, Pond Problems in 1914.

A conscientious objector during the First World War, Unwin continued to teach for its duration. Following the end of the war he published his second work, As a Man Thinketh, followed by his third: Religion and Biology, in 1922. The next year he emigrated to Australia to assume the headmastership of Friends' School in Hobart. He undertook a rebuilding and expansion play aided by financial support from local Quakers, which was highly successful. He became a popular figure, "often the subject of intense curiosity. One of them described him as 'short and stockily built', with slightly bowed legs, fresh complexion, fair hair and penetrating blue eyes. Customarily he wore a bowler hat and carried pigskin gloves, while in winter he donned spats."

Recognised for his abilities, Unwin was selected by the Tasmanian government to join a state education board in 1925. He became secretary for Tasmania's committee on educational extension in 1942, and created the Association of Headmasters and Headmistresses of the Independent Schools of Tasmania, for which he was secretary until his death 1944.
