= Margaret Booth =

American film editor (1898–2002)

- Born: January 16, 1898; Los Angeles, California, U.S.
- Died: October 28, 2002 (aged 104); Los Angeles, California, U.S.
- Education: Los Angeles High School
- Occupations: Film editor, producer
- Years active: 1915–1985
- Relatives: Elmer Booth (brother)

Margaret Booth (January 16, 1898 – October 28, 2002) was an American film editor. In a career lasting seven decades, Booth was most associated with Metro-Goldwyn-Mayer.

Born in Los Angeles, Margaret was the younger sister of actor Elmer Booth, who starred in several films for D. W. Griffith. Elmer was killed in a car accident, and Griffith later employed Margaret as a negative cutter. Booth worked with Griffith's studio for several years. She later joined Louis B. Mayer's namesake studio, where she was mentored by film director John M. Stahl. In 1924, Mayer merged his studio with Metro Pictures and Goldwyn Pictures to form Metro-Goldwyn-Mayer. Stahl and Booth joined MGM, where she edited several of his films. Stahl later left MGM, while Booth stayed. She was named the studio's first official film editor by Irving Thalberg, MGM's then-production head. In 1935, Booth received an Academy Award nomination for Best Film Editing on Mutiny on the Bounty.

After Thalberg's death, Mayer appointed Booth as the MGM's supervising film editor, a position she held for nearly three decades. Booth retired from MGM in 1968 and was hired by Ray Stark as a supervising film editor for his Rastar Productions company. In 1977, Booth was awarded an Academy Honorary Award for her decades-long contributions as a film editor. She received her last credit as an executive producer for The Slugger's Wife (1985). Booth became a centenarian in 1998, and died in 2002 at the age of 104.

== Early life ==
Margaret Booth was born on January 16, 1898, in Los Angeles to Edward J. Booth Sr. and Margaret A. Boland. Her older brother was Elmer Booth, who was an actor for D. W. Griffith and the breadwinner for the family. On June 16, 1915, Elmer was riding with actor George Siegmann in a car driven by Tod Browning. Due to the heavy fog that day, Browning did not see the rear lamp of an oncoming train. Browning's car was hit by a train of the Salt Lake Railroad, killing Elmer instantly. Browning and Siegmann however survived but suffered serious injuries. At Elmer's funeral, Griffith delivered a eulogy and approached Margaret with a job offer as a film joiner (also known as a negative cutter) to provide income for the family. Margaret never forgave Browning for her brother's death.

== Career ==
=== 1915–1921: Editing for D. W. Griffith ===
By 1915, Booth had graduated from Los Angeles High School. Griffith hired Booth on a salary for ten dollars a week as one of several female editors for his studio. Booth remembered years later, "...in the old days we had to cut negative by eye. We matched the print to the negative without any edge numbers. We had to match the action. Sometimes there'd be a tiny pinpoint on the negative, and then you knew you were right, but it was very tedious work." One of the films she worked on was Orphans of the Storm (1921) starring Lillian Gish. After a few months, Booth worked for Paramount Pictures' editing department, assembling the tinted sections for release prints.

=== 1921–1938: Editing at MGM ===
In 1921, Booth began working for Louis B. Mayer at his namesake film production studio. Mayer had hired John M. Stahl when Edward Small, who was Stahl's publicity agent, inquired why there were no hired Jewish directors. Inside the editing room, Booth observed Stahl, and because he was a perfectionist, Stahl would shoot multiple takes of several scenes and leave outtake footage literally on the cutting room floor. At the end of the day, Booth assembled the outtakes and stayed overnight to practice her cutting techniques. One day, Stahl was frustrated when he couldn't make a scene work. After he left, Booth took her own approach; when Stahl screened her work, he was impressed and hired her immediately as his editorial assistant. For Stahl, she edited The Gay Deceiver (1926), Lovers? (1927), and In Old Kentucky (1927).

Stahl personally mentored Booth on the craft of film editing, explaining the exact purpose for his editing decisions. Booth reflected, "He taught the value of a scene. When a scene drops or doesn't drop, and when it sustains. You have to feel this, intrusively, in your work." In 1924, Mayer merged with Metro Pictures and Goldwyn Pictures to form a new conglomerate film production studio known as Metro-Goldwyn-Mayer (MGM). Stahl stayed with MGM for several years, but when he left the studio in 1927, he asked Booth to join him but she declined. Booth stated, "I went on to working at M-G-M, mostly with [Irving] Thalberg—the greatest man who was ever in pictures. M-G-M was like home to me." Her editing skills were appreciated by Thalberg, MGM's head of production, that he asked her if she would consider directing. However, she was not interested. Regardless, according to film historian Cari Beauchamp, Thalberg was the first known person to call cutters "film editors," starting with Booth. Her first official editing credit was for the 1929 part-talkie film The Bridge of San Luis Rey.

At MGM, Booth edited several films starring Greta Garbo, including Camille (1936). She also edited Wise Girls (1929), The Barretts of Wimpole Street (1934), and Romeo and Juliet (1936). In 1935, Booth worked on Mutiny on the Bounty (1935). At the start of production, Frank Lloyd took a unit of cameramen to Tahiti to shoot the exteriors and brought the footage to MGM. As Booth edited the film, she recalled, "Evey time I needed a piece from Tahiti, I just went to the bin and there it was. It was all lined up before they even started shooting there." Scenes of the HMS Bounty on the open sea were filmed near Catalina Island, off the coast of Los Angeles. There, on the island, Booth explained that she would "fly to Catalina every day with the film and run the film with the director, Frank Lloyd, and then come back and cut it."

Mutiny on the Bounty was previewed in Santa Barbara, California, where it received a standing ovation. She later received her only competitive Academy Award nomination for Best Film Editing on Mutiny on the Bounty (1935).

=== 1939–1968: Supervising editor of MGM ===
In 1936, Thalberg had unexpectedly died and Mayer assumed the position as production head. Three years later, in 1939, Mayer appointed Booth to be the studio's supervising film editor. Booth stated, "They liked me because I was fast. I was always very fast cutting everything I did. And boy, was I tough." As the supervising editor, she did no actual film editing herself but instead hired the personnel and reviewed the dailies for each film, overseeing such classics such as The Wizard of Oz (1939) and Ben-Hur (1959).

In his 1995 book Making Movies, director Sidney Lumet called Booth "a remarkable person. She was bright and tireless, and she loved movies. I don't know if she had any other life." He told one story while filming The Hill (1965) in England, in which she arrived on location and asked to see a rough-cut version, promptly at eight during the following morning. A screening was arranged for her, with Lumet and Thelma Connell, the editor for The Hill, present. When the screening was over, she asked for two minutes of the film to be cut so it would be under two hours. Lumet pushed back and after two more screenings, Booth relented. Following the third screening, Lumet consoled a despondent Booth, who personally felt none of the new studio executives knew or care about filmmaking.

She remained in her position until she retired in 1968. In an oral interview with film historian Rudy Behlmer, Booth stated she was fired by then-MGM president James Aubrey.

=== 1969–1985: Editing for Ray Stark ===
On the night she left MGM, Booth was hired by Ray Stark as the supervising editor for his company, Rastar Productions. Her first project with him was The Owl and the Pussycat (1970).

Booth next supervised the editing for several films, including The Way We Were (1973), The Sunshine Boys (1975), The Goodbye Girl (1977), California Suite (1978), and Annie (1982). She was last credited as an executive producer for The Slugger's Wife (1985) when she was 87.

In 1977, Booth was awarded an Academy Honorary Award denoting her for "62 years of exceptionally distinguished service to the motion picture industry as a film editor." In 1983, she was awarded the Women in Film Crystal Award for outstanding women who, through their endurance and the excellence of their work, have helped to expand the role of women within the entertainment industry. On her centennial birthday, in 1998, Booth was honored with a gala commemorating her seven-decade contributions to the film industry at the Sheraton Universal Hotel, hosted by the Motion Picture Editors Guild.

== Death and legacy ==
On October 28, 2002, Booth, at age 104, died from complications after suffering a stroke. She is interred at Inglewood Park Cemetery in Inglewood California.

In its 1982 article about Booth's long tenureship, the Village Voice describes her as "the final authority of every picture the studio made for 30 years." In their obituary for Booth, the British newspaper The Guardian stated, "All the filmmakers had to go through her in order to have a final editing of sound and vision approved," while describing her approach:

She was a pioneer of the classic editing style, the so-called "invisible cutting", the aim of which was to make the transition from one image to another as seamless as possible, so the audience was almost unaware of the flow of shots within a sequence. Narrative was dominant, maintaining a continuity of time and space, and matching cuts to action.

== Filmography ==
Year	Title	Director	Notes	Refs
1921	Orphans of the Storm	D. W. Griffith	Cutter; Uncredited	
1924	Why Men Leave Home	John M. Stahl	Co-editor; Collaborated with Stahl	
1924	Husbands and Lovers	John M. Stahl	Co-editor; Collaborated with Stahl	
1925	Fine Clothes	John M. Stahl	Co-editor; Collaborated with Stahl	
1926	Memory Lane	John M. Stahl	Co-editor; Collaborated with Stahl	
1926	The Gay Deceiver	John M. Stahl	Co-editor; Collaborated with Stahl	
1927	The Enemy	Fred Niblo	Editor	
1927	Lovers?	John M. Stahl	Editor	
1927	In Old Kentucky	John M. Stahl	Editor	
1928	Bringing Up Father	Jack Conway	Editor	
1928	Telling the World	Sam Wood	Editor; Collaborated with John Colton	
1928	The Mysterious Lady	Fred Niblo	Editor	
1928	A Lady of Chance	Robert Z. Leonard	Editor	
1929	The Bridge of San Luis Rey	Charles Brabin	Editor	
1929	Wise Girls	E. Mason Hopper	Editor; Screenwriter	
1930	The Rogue Song	Lionel Barrymore	Editor	
1930	Redemption	Fred Niblo	Editor	
1930	Strictly Unconventional	David Burton	Editor	
1930	The Lady of Scandal	Sidney Franklin	Editor	
1930	A Lady's Morals	Sidney Franklin	Editor	
1931	New Moon	Jack Conway	Editor	
1931	The Prodigal	Harry A. Pollard	Editor	
1931	It's a Wise Child	Robert Z. Leonard	Editor	
1931	The Cuban Love Song	W. S. Van Dyke	Editor	
1931	Five and Ten	Robert Z. Leonard	Editor	
1931	Susan Lenox (Her Fall and Rise)	Robert Z. Leonard	Editor	
1932	Lovers Courageous	Robert Z. Leonard	Editor	
1932	Smilin' Through	Sidney Franklin	Editor	
1932	Strange Interlude	Robert Z. Leonard	Editor	
1932	The Son-Daughter	Clarence Brown	Editor	
1933	White Sister	Victor Fleming	Editor	
1933	Peg o' My Heart	Robert Z. Leonard	Editor	
1933	Storm at Daybreak	Richard Boleslawski	Editor	
1933	Bombshell	Victor Fleming	Editor	
1933	Dancing Lady	Robert Z. Leonard	Editor	
1934	Riptide	Edmund Goulding	Editor	
1934	The Barretts of Wimpole Street	Sidney Franklin	Editor	
1935	Reckless	Victor Fleming	Editor	
1935	Mutiny on the Bounty	Frank Lloyd	Editor; Nominated for an Academy Award for Best Film Editing	
1936	Camille	George Cukor	Editor	
1936	Romeo and Juliet	George Cukor	Editor	
1938	A Yank at Oxford	Jack Conway	Editorial Supervisor	
1963	The V.I.P.s	Anthony Asquith	Production advisor	
1970	The Owl and the Pussycat	Herbert Ross	Editorial Supervisor	
1972	Fat City	John Huston	Editorial Supervisor	
1973	The Way We Were	Sydney Pollock	Editorial Supervisor	
1975	The Sunshine Boys	Herbert Ross	Editorial Supervisor	
1975	The Black Bird	David Giler	Editorial Supervisor	
1976	Murder by Death	Robert Moore	Editorial Supervisor	
1977	The Goodbye Girl	Herbert Ross	Editorial Supervisor	
1978	California Suite	Herbert Ross	Editorial Supervisor	
1978	The Cheap Detective	Robert Moore	Associate producer	
1978	Chapter Two	Robert Moore	Editorial Supervisor; Associate producer	
1980	Seems Like Old Times	Jay Sandrich	Editorial Supervisor; Associate producer	
1982	The Toy	Richard Donner	Associate producer	
1982	Annie	John Huston	Associate producer	
1985	The Slugger's Wife	Hal Ashby	Executive producer	

== See also ==
- List of centenarians (actors, filmmakers and entertainers)

== Works cited ==
- Acker, Ally (1991). Reel Women: Pioneers of the Cinema, 1896 to the Present. New York: Continuum Publishing. ISBN 978-0-8264-0499-2.
- Atkins, Irene Kahn (Summer–Autumn 1976). "Margaret Booth" (PDF). Focus on Film. No. 25. pp. 51–56. ISSN 0015-5128.
- Behlmer, Rudy (1991). An Oral History with Margaret Booth. Academy Foundation.
- Brownlow, Kevin (1968). The Parade's Gone By. New York: Alfred A. Knopf. ISBN 978-0-5200-3068-8.
- Eyman, Scott (2005). Lion of Hollywood: The Life and Legend of Louis B. Mayer. New York: Simon & Schuster. ISBN 0-7432-0481-6.
- Lumet, Sidney (1995). Making Movies. New York: Alfred A. Knopf. ISBN 0-679-43709-6.
- Malone, Alicia (2017). Backwards and in Heels: The Past, Present and Future of Women Working in Film. Coral Gables, Florida: Mango Publishing. ISBN 978-1-6335-3618-0.
- Menuel, David (2016). Women Film Editors: Unseen Artists of American Cinema. Jefferson, North Carolina: McFarland & Company. ISBN 978-1-476-62520-1.
- Unterberger, Amy L., ed. (1998). Women Filmmakers & Their Films. Detroit: St. James Press. ISBN 978-1-5586-2357-6.
