= Carolynne Snowden =

American actress

- Born: Carrie Artiemissia Snowden; January 16, 1900; Oakland, California, U.S.
- Died: September 5, 1985 (aged 85); Los Angeles, California, U.S.
- Occupations: Actress, singer
- Spouses: Fontaine Walker (divorced): Manfred Montagu

Carrie Artiemissia Snowden (January 16, 1900 – September 5, 1985), known professionally as Carolynne Snowden, was an American actress, dancer, and singer who broke new ground for black people working in the entertainment industry.

== Biography ==
Carolynne was born in Oakland, California, to Frederick Snowden and Nellie Derrick. Early on in her career, she performed on the theater circuit, traveling the country and earning acclaim. She was singing and dancing at New York City's famous Cotton Club by the early 1920s.

By 1925, she had relocated to Los Angeles to perform at the New Cotton Club and at Club Alabam on Central Avenue; she slowly began to get small roles in Hollywood films like The Marriage Clause and The Merry Widow. Eventually she signed a five-year contract with John M. Stahl's Tiffany Pictures, which led to a bigger role in 1927's In Old Kentucky alongside Stepin Fetchit.

Carolynne left Hollywood around 1933 after her Tiffany contract was up, taking her show on the road and refocusing her efforts on singing and dancing. She died in 1985 in Los Angeles, and was survived by her husband Manfred Montagu and her daughter, Esther Smith.

== Selected filmography ==
- A Day at the Races (1937)
- The Green Pastures (1936)
- Strike Me Pink (1936)
- Murder at the Vanities (1934)
- Flying Down to Rio (1933)
- The Sport Parade (1932)
- Honey (1930)
- Playing Around (1930)
- On with the Show! (1929)
- Fox Movietone Follies of 1929 (1929)
- Innocents of Paris (1929)
- Show Boat (1929)
- The Wedding March (1928)
- Sweet Sixteen (1928)
- Nameless Men (1928)
- The Devil's Skipper (1928)
- In Old Kentucky (1927)
- The Jazz Singer (1927)
- Orchids and Ermine (1927)
- The Marriage Clause (1926)
- The First Year (1926)
- The Gilded Butterfly (1926)
- The Marriage Clause (1926)
- The Merry Widow (1925)
