= Grace Davison =

American actress

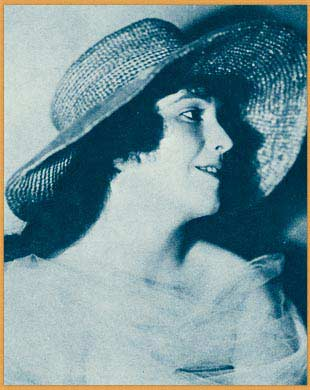
- Born: Oceanside, New York, US
- Occupation: Actress
- Years active: 1917–1922

Grace Davison (born in Oceanside, Long Island), was an American actress whose career encompassed 11 feature films from 1917 to 1922 and a film producer.

== Early years ==
Davison was born on Long Island and found fascination in films as a child.

== Career ==
"Recently, Davison organized her own producing company and made "Wives of Men" starring Florence Reed. Miss Davison played the second lead in this picture. Later her company produced "Atonement" starring Miss Davison and Conway Tearle, and "Man's Plaything" with Miss Davison and Montague Love. At present she was working on a new feature play, the first in which she would be starred alone. Miss Davison's unusual beauty and talent were fast winning for her an enviable reputation. Davison's father provided money to start and operate her company, Grace Davison Productions.

== Selected filmography ==
- Suspicion (1918)
- Atonement (1919)
