= Memory Lane (1926 film) =

1926 film by John M. Stahl

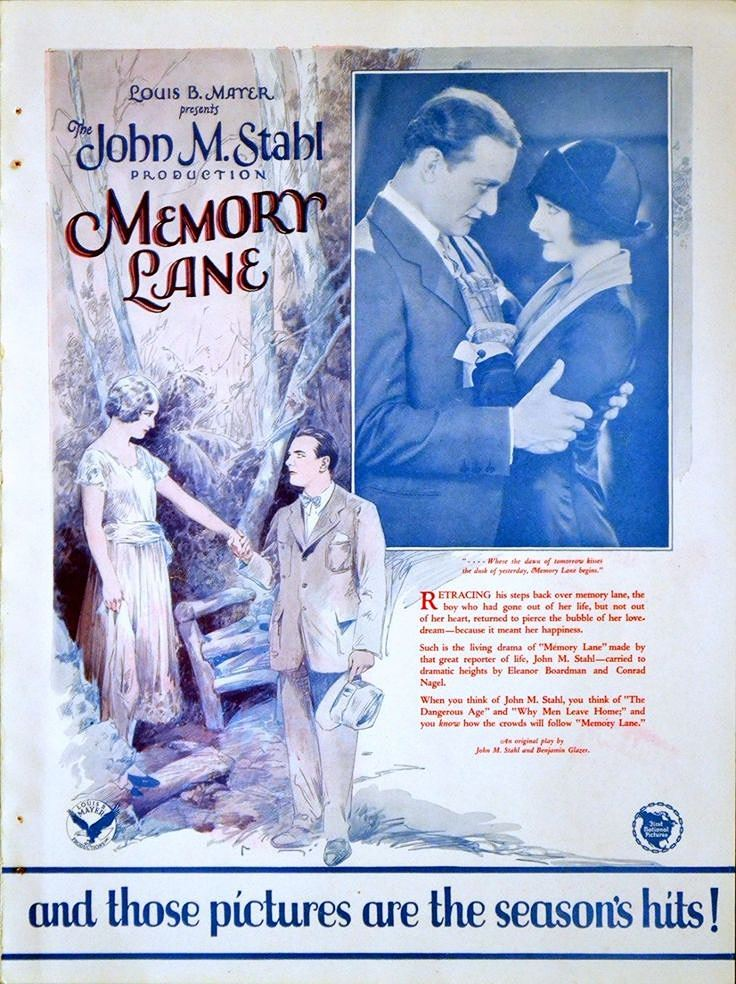
- Advertisement
- Directed by: John M. Stahl
- Written by: John M. Stahl; Benjamin Glazer
- Produced by: John M. Stahl; Louis B. Mayer
- Starring: Eleanor Boardman; Conrad Nagel; William Haines
- Cinematography: Percy Hilburn
- Edited by: Margaret Booth
- Production company: Louis B. Mayer Productions
- Distributed by: First National Pictures
- Release date: February 1, 1926
- Running time: 78 minutes
- Country: United States
- Language: Silent (English intertitles)

Memory Lane is a 1926 American silent romantic comedy film directed by John M. Stahl and starring Eleanor Boardman, Conrad Nagel, and William Haines.

The film's sets were designed by the art director Cedric Gibbons and A. Arnold Gillespie. A print of the film exists. The film was made by Louis B. Mayer's production company and released through First National Pictures even though he worked as head of the rival MGM.

== Plot ==
As described in a film magazine review, Mary and Joe are childhood sweethearts, but Joe later goes to New York City to make his fortune and never writes. After a few years, Jimmy Holt comes into her life. On the eve of her wedding, Joe returns to the town and Mary sneaks out of the house to see him and finds that she still cares for her old sweetheart. However, rather than hurt her fiancé, she goes through with the wedding. Joe returns to the city. A few years pass and a baby arrives. Joe hears this news and returns to the village. deciding that it is up to him to ensure she is happy with her life with her husband and child, he acts obnoxiously when he sees her, and Mary is disgusted. Seeing that his stunt worked, Joe returns to New York City.

== Cast ==
- Eleanor Boardman as Mary
- Conrad Nagel as Jimmy Holt
- William Haines as Joe Field
- John Steppling as Mary's Father
- Eugenie Forde as Mary's Mother
- Frankie Darro as Urchin
- Dot Farley as Maid
- Joan Standing as Maid
- Kate Price as Phone Booth Woman
- Florence Midgley
- Dale Fuller
- Billie Bennett

== Bibliography ==
- William J. Mann. Wisecracker: The Life and Times of William Haines. Viking, 1998.
