= The Woman Under Oath =

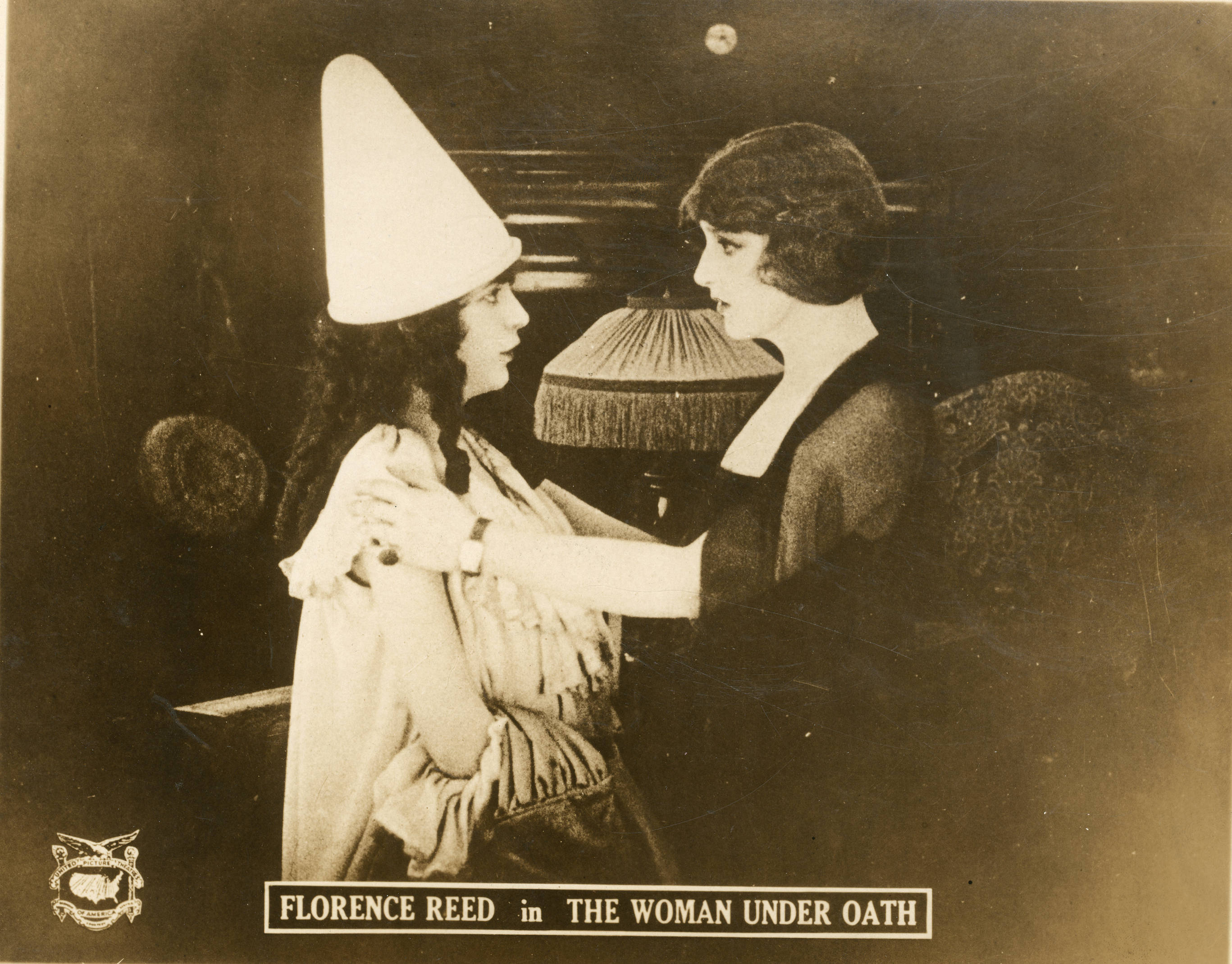
- Film still
- Directed by: John M. Stahl
- Starring: Florence Reed
- Cinematography: John K. Holbrook
- Production company: Tribune Productions
- Distributed by: United Picture Theatres of America
- Release date: June 29, 1919
- Running time: 6 reels
- Country: United States
- Language: Silent (English intertitles)

The Woman Under Oath is a 1919 American silent mystery film directed by John M. Stahl and starring stage star Florence Reed. As with the previous Stahl and Reed film, Her Code of Honor, it was produced by Tribune Productions and released by United Picture Theatres of America Incorporated.

== Plot ==
As described in a film magazine, Edith Norton, hearing of the pending marriage of her betrayer Edward Knox, urges him to right the wrong he has done her. He refuses, so her sister Grace shoots and kills him. Jim O'Neil, who has come gunning for the man for a similar reason involving his fiancé Helen, is accused of the crime when he is discovered standing over the body. The police use a particularly disgusting third degree interrogation to drag a confession from the innocent man. He is brought to trial and Grace is drawn on the jury. At trial the six shooter is brandished per custom before the accused and jury with the usual effect. The circumstantial evidence convinces the eleven men on the jury that the defendant is guilty, but Grace holds out for acquittal. The judge directs that the jury be locked in for the night on Christmas Eve, and the men on the jury try to convince her of the man's guilt, but she is obdurate. Then a telegram arrives which informs her of her sister's death. Grace tells her story, and the men change their votes to "not guilty".

== Cast ==
- Florence Reed as Grace Norton
- Hugh Thompson as John Schuyler
- Gareth Hughes as Jim O'Neil
- David Powell as Edward Knox
- Florida Kingsley as Mrs. O'Neil
- Mildred Cheshire as Helen
- May McAvoy as Edith Norton
- Harold Entwistle as The Judge
- Tom McGuire as District Attorney (credited as Thomas McGuire)
- Walter McEwen as Defense Attorney
- Edward Brennan as Clerk of the Court
- Frank De Camp as Jury Foreman
- Edward Elkas as A Juror (credited as Edward Elkus)
- Jane Jennings

== Preservation ==
The film survives today at the BFI National Archive.
