= Fine Clothes =

1925 film directed by John M. Stahl

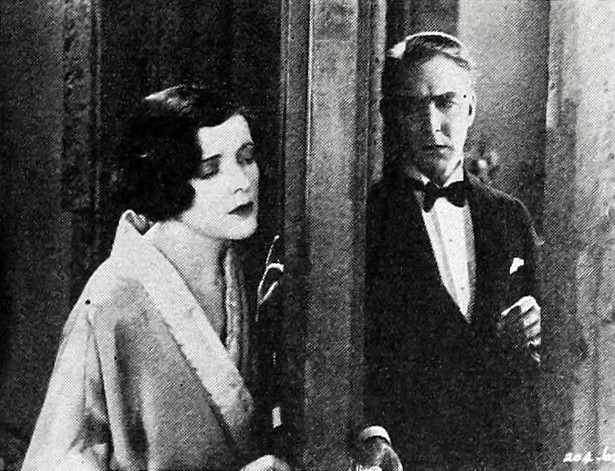
- Still with Rubens and Marmont
- Directed by: John M. Stahl
- Written by: Benjamin Glazer
- Based on: Fashions for Men by Ferenc Molnár
- Produced by: Louis B. Mayer
- Starring: Lewis Stone; Percy Marmont; Alma Rubens
- Cinematography: Ernest Palmer
- Edited by: Margaret Booth; Robert Kern
- Production company: Louis B. Mayer Productions
- Distributed by: First National Pictures
- Release date: August 9, 1925
- Running time: 80 minutes
- Country: United States
- Language: Silent (English intertitles)

Fine Clothes is a 1925 American silent comedy film directed by John M. Stahl and starring Lewis Stone, Percy Marmont, and Alma Rubens. It is based on a play adapted from Ferenc Molnár's original.

The film's sets were designed by the art director Cedric Gibbons.

== Plot ==
As described in a film magazine review, Peter operates an elaborate haberdashery when his wife elopes with his clerk and bank account. Peter soon becomes bankrupt and is given work by the Earl of Denham, who flirts with Paula, Peter's former cashier. Paula has accompanied Peter to the Earl's estate to work. Peter shields Paula from the Earl's advances, so the Earl sets Peter up in business to get rid of him. However, Paula follows Peter, and drives away the two elopers when they return in an effort to gain Peter's favor.

== Cast ==
- Lewis Stone as Earl of Denham
- Percy Marmont as Peter Hungerford
- Alma Rubens as Paula
- Raymond Griffith as Oscar
- Eileen Percy as Adele
- William V. Mong as Philip
- John Merkyl as Receiver
- Otis Harlan as Alfred

== Preservation ==
The film is now lost.

== Bibliography ==
- Munden, Kenneth White. The American Film Institute Catalog of Motion Pictures Produced in the United States, Part 1. University of California Press, 1997.
