= The Woman in His House =

The Woman in His House may refer to:

- The Woman in His House (1920 film), an American silent drama film
- The Animal Kingdom (1932 film), also known as The Woman in His House, a 1932 American pre-Code comedy-drama film
