= The Song of Life (1922 film) =

1922 film directed by John M. Stahl

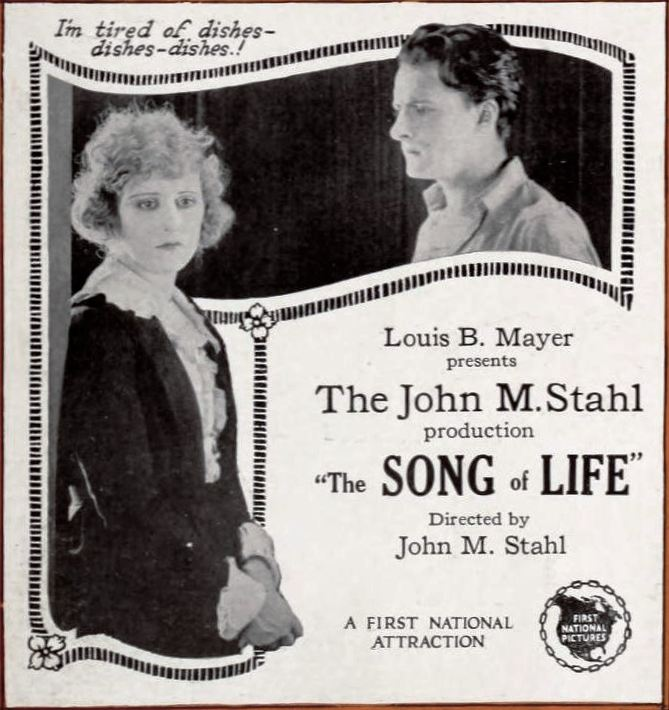
- Advertisement
- Directed by: John M. Stahl
- Written by: Bess Meredyth
- Story by: Frances Irene Reels
- Produced by: Louis B. Mayer
- Starring: Gaston Glass; Grace Darmond; Georgia Woodthorpe
- Cinematography: Ernest Palmer
- Production company: Louis B. Mayer Productions
- Distributed by: First National Pictures
- Release date: January 2, 1922
- Running time: 7 reels
- Country: United States
- Language: Silent (English intertitles)

The Song of Life is a 1922 American silent drama film directed by John M. Stahl and starring Gaston Glass, Grace Darmond, and Georgia Woodthorpe.

== Plot ==
As described in a film magazine, Mary Tilden finds life as the wife of a railroad track foreman merely a treadmill of dirty dishes, and even her little baby brings no peace. One day, unable to stand it no longer, she boards an eastbound train that has stopped for water and runs away from it all. The same train had killed her husband on a nearby trestle.

Twenty-five years later, Mary, worn and tired by her fruitless struggle for the "pretty things" always just beyond her grasp, is still washing dishes. Chance brings her young neighbor David to her door in the nick of time, and Mary finds her niche living in his home and doing the housework for him and his young wife Aline. Aline, like Mary so long ago, is wild for the pretty things and loathes the round of housework.

With her new freedom, Aline persuades her husband to let her return to work in a music shop. An attractive young publisher, Richard Henderson, gives her a ride home one rainy night. When David goes to discuss selling the story he has been working on, he finds his wife's picture on the publisher's desk, and his jealousy is aroused. When his wife leaves for a weekend, he starts out with a pistol.

Meanwhile, Mary, reading the story David has written, actually the story of his life, discovers that David is her son. She is disturbed reading of the violence of his hatred towards the mother who deserted him, so does not reveal what she knows. Mary goes to Henderson's apartment and pleads with him to send Arline home. David comes in and fires at Henderson, felling him. Mary tries to assume the blame for the shooting, and as the authorities learn more of the relationships and David tells his story, they believe that David is attempting to shield her from the crime.

However, Henderson recovers from his wounds and decides not to prosecute, leading to a reunion among the husband, wife, and mother.

== Cast ==
- Gaston Glass as David Tilden
- Grace Darmond as Aline Tilden
- Georgia Woodthorpe as Mary Tilden
- Richard Headrick as Neighbor's Boy
- Arthur Stuart Hull as District Attorney
- Wedgwood Nowell as Richard Henderson
- Edward Peil Sr. as Amos Tilden
- Fred Kelsey as Police Inspector
- Claude Payton as Central Office Man
- Miriam Bellah as Little Girl

== Bibliography ==
- Munden, Kenneth White. The American Film Institute Catalog of Motion Pictures Produced in the United States, Part 1. University of California Press, 1997.
