= The Dangerous Age (1923 film) =

1923 film directed by John M. Stahl

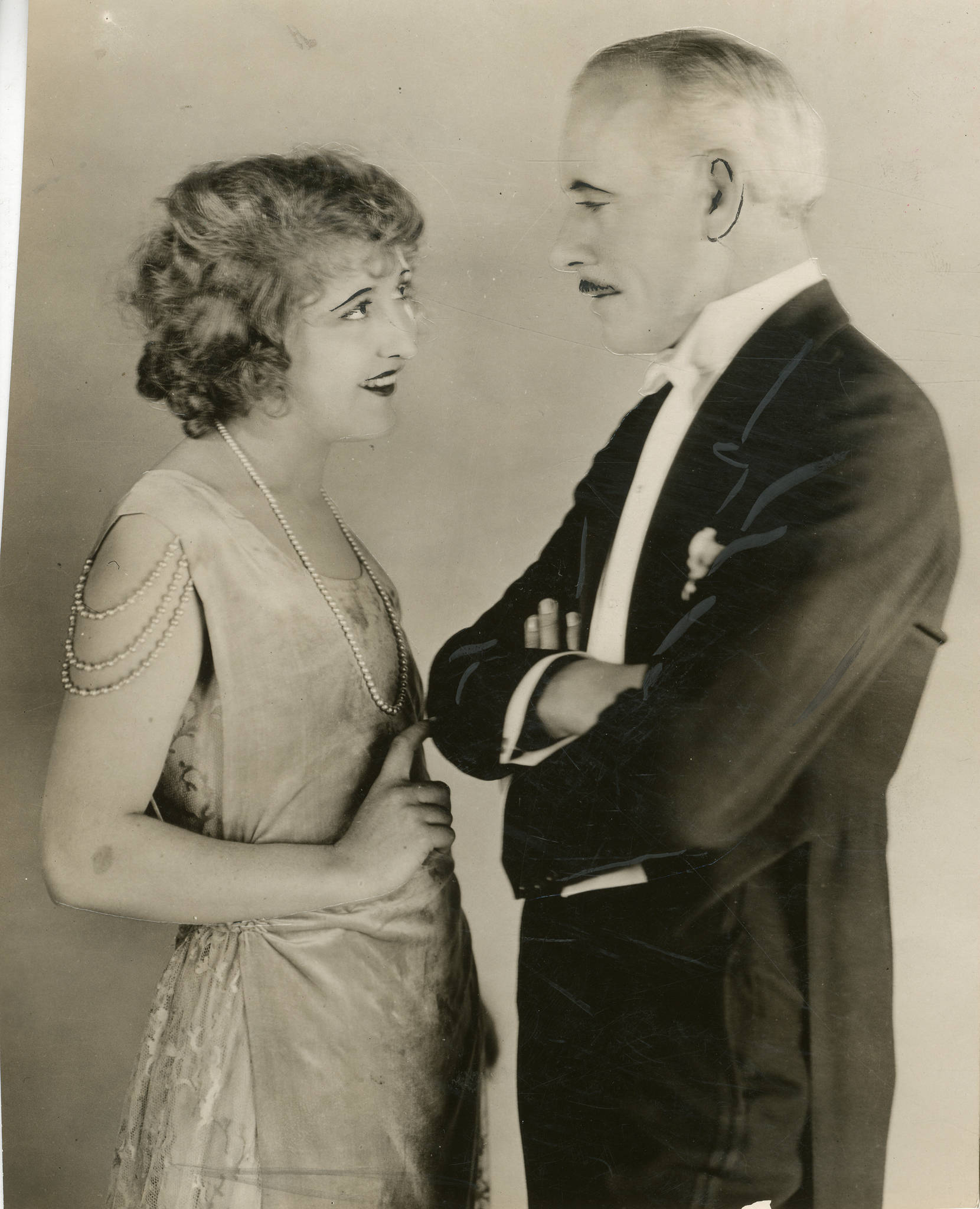
- Cleo Madison and Lewis Stone in The Dangerous Age
- Directed by: John M. Stahl
- Screenplay by: J.G. Hawks; Bess Meredyth; Lenore Coffee
- Story by: Frances Irene Reels
- Produced by: Louis B. Mayer
- Starring: Lewis Stone; Cleo Madison; Edith Roberts; Ruth Clifford; Myrtle Stedman; James Morrison
- Cinematography: Jackson Rose; Allen G. Siegler
- Production company: Louis B. Mayer Productions
- Distributed by: Associated First National Pictures
- Release date: February 4, 1923
- Running time: 70 minutes
- Country: United States
- Language: Silent (English intertitles)

The Dangerous Age is a 1923 American silent drama film directed by John M. Stahl and written by J.G. Hawks, Bess Meredyth, and Lenore Coffee. The film stars Lewis Stone, Cleo Madison, Edith Roberts, Ruth Clifford, Myrtle Stedman, and James Morrison. The film was released on February 4, 1923, by Associated First National Pictures.

== Plot ==
As described in a film magazine, John Emerson, married twenty years, finds that romance and color have left his life. His wife Mary fails to sympathize with his longing for some of their previous enthusiasm. While traveling to New York City John encounters and is fascinated by Gloria Sanderson. With her he makes the fiddy rounds of Gotham's cabarets. He tells her that he is not married. Afterwards, he writes to Mary, telling her what happened, and that he does not intend to return home. At that moment a wire is on the way to him announcing the upcoming marriage of his daughter Ruth. After mailing the letter his fancy for Gloria receives a decided check when he finds her in the arms of another man. She tells him that she did not believe he was serious in his lovemaking, so a much agitated John heads for home. He wants to intercept the fatal letter, so he drives after and boards the train, incidentally wrecking his automobile. He arrives home just in time for his daughter's wedding. Meanwhile, Mary has realized her error towards John and he finds her changed for the better. His one desperate thought is to retain her love and prevent his letter from reaching her. However, she obtains the letter and reads it, but keeps this knowledge from her husband. She says she has not received it and asks what its contents are. John hastily improvises an affectionate epistle and Mary is content, knowing his spoken words are true.

== Cast ==
- Lewis Stone as John Emerson
- Cleo Madison as Mary Emerson
- Edith Roberts as Ruth Emerson
- Ruth Clifford as Gloria Sanderson
- Myrtle Stedman as Mrs. Sanderson
- James Morrison as Bob
- Helen Lynch as Bebe Nash
- Lincoln Stedman as Ted
- Edmund Burns as Tom
- Richard Tucker as Robert Chanslor
- Sidney Algier
- Maxine Tabnac as Child (uncredited)

== Preservation ==
With no prints of The Dangerous Age located in any film archives, it is considered a lost film. In February 2021, the film was cited by the National Film Preservation Board on their Lost U.S. Silent Feature Films list.
