= Husbands and Lovers =

1924 film directed by John M. Stahl

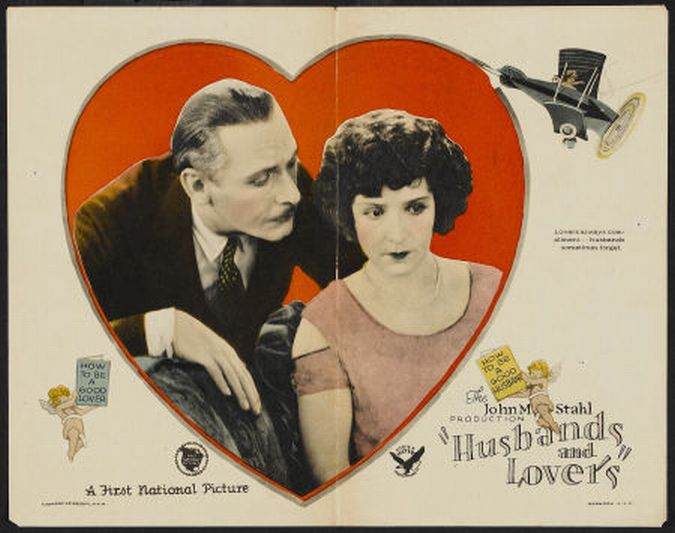
- Lobby card
- Directed by: John M. Stahl
- Written by: John M. Stahl; Frances Irene Reels; Madge Tyrone (titles)
- Produced by: Louis B. Mayer
- Starring: Florence Vidor
- Cinematography: Tony Gaudio
- Edited by: Robert J. Kern; Margaret Booth
- Distributed by: First National Pictures
- Release date: November 2, 1924
- Running time: 80 minutes
- Country: United States
- Language: Silent (English intertitles)

Husbands and Lovers is a 1924 American silent comedy film directed by John M. Stahl and starring Florence Vidor and Lewis Stone. It was produced by Louis B. Mayer and released by First National Pictures.

== Plot ==
As described in a review in a film magazine, James Livingstone, reaching the stage where he regards his wife Grace as a valet as she "lays out" her husband's clothes, is rudely awakened when she takes his advice and "dolls up." Rex Phillips, debonair friend of James, also takes notice of the change with some flattery. As a result, the two become infatuated. James abruptly learns of the secret friendship when his circumstances cause him to substitute for Phillips in a tryst with Grace. He consents to her obtaining a divorce. James comes to realize he is still in love and to appreciates his former wife's yearning for verbal flattery. She is about to marry Rex when James, like a regular caveman, carries Grace away in her bridal array to his car and elopes to the minister's to be wedded a second time.

== Cast ==
- Lewis Stone as James Livingston
- Florence Vidor as Grace Livingston
- Dale Fuller as Marie
- Winter Hall as Robert Stanton
- Edith Yorke as Mrs. Stanton
- Lew Cody as Rex Phillips

== Preservation ==
A complete print of Husbands and Lovers is preserved by MGM and also at EYE Film Institute Netherlands.
