= The Musketeers of Pig Alley =

1912 film directed by D. W. Griffith

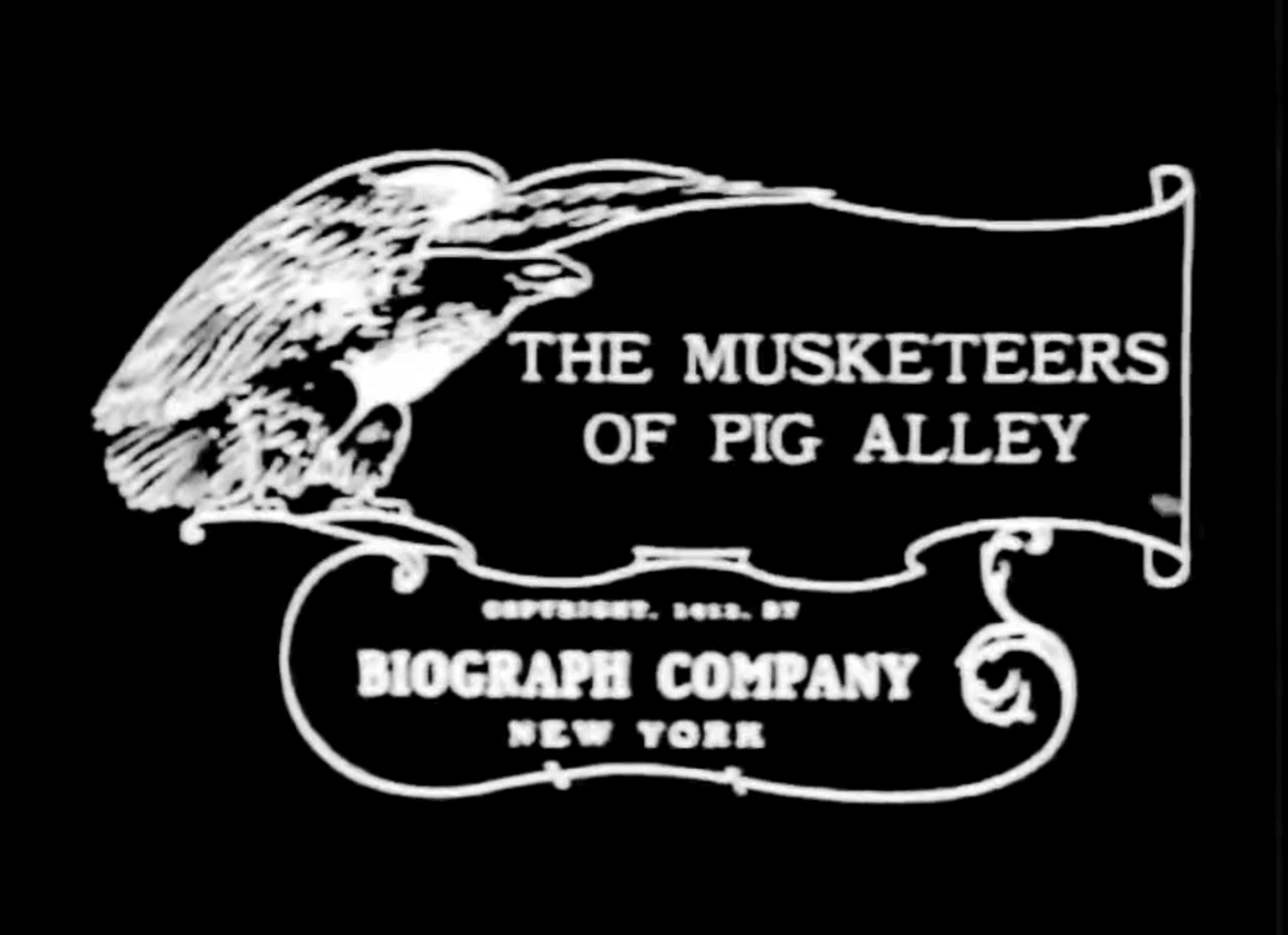
- Title card
- Directed by: D. W. Griffith
- Written by: D. W. Griffith; Anita Loos
- Starring: Elmer Booth; Lillian Gish; Clara T. Bracy; Walter Miller
- Music by: Robert Israel
- Distributed by: General Film Company
- Release dates: October 31, 1912; November 5, 1915 (U.S.)
- Running time: 17 minutes (16 frames per second)
- Country: United States
- Language: Silent (English intertitles)

Complete film

The Musketeers of Pig Alley is a 1912 American short drama and a gangster film. It is directed by D. W. Griffith and written by Griffith and Anita Loos. It is also credited for its early use of follow focus, a fundamental tool in cinematography.

The film was released on October 31, 1912, and re-released on November 5, 1915, in the United States. The film was shot in Fort Lee, New Jersey where many other early film studios in America's first motion picture industry were based at the beginning of the 20th century. Location shots in New York City reportedly used actual street gang members as extras during the film.

In 2016, the film was selected for preservation in the United States National Film Registry by the Library of Congress as being "culturally, historically, or aesthetically significant".

== Plot ==
The film is about a poor married couple living in New York City. The husband works as a musician and must often travel for work. When returning, his wallet is taken by a gangster. His wife goes to a ball where a man tries to drug her, but his attempt is stopped by the same man who robbed the husband. The two criminals become rivals, and a shootout ensues. The husband gets caught in the shootout and recognizes one of the men as the gangster who took his money. The husband sneaks his wallet back and the gangster goes to safety in the couple's apartment. Policemen track the gangster down but the wife gives him a false alibi.

== Cast ==
- Elmer Booth as Snapper Kid, Musketeers Gang Leader
- Lillian Gish as The Little Lady
- Clara T. Bracy as The Little Lady's Mother
- Walter Miller as The Musician
- Alfred Paget as Rival Gang Leader
- John T. Dillon as Policeman
- Madge Kirby as The Little Lady's Friend / In Alley
- Harry Carey as Snapper's Sidekick
- Robert Harron as Rival Gang Member / In Alley / At Gangster's Ball
- W. C. Robinson as Rival Gang Member (credited as Spike Robinson)
- Adolph Lestina as The Bartender / On Street
- Jack Pickford as Boy Gang Member / At Dance Ball

Uncredited:

- Gertrude Bambrick as Girl At Dance
- Lionel Barrymore as The Musician's Friend
- Kathleen Butler as On Street / At Dance
- Christy Cabanne as At Dance
- Donald Crisp as Rival Gang Member
- Frank Evans as At Dance
- Dorothy Gish as Girl In Street
- Walter P. Lewis as In Alley / At Dance
- Antonio Moreno as Musketeers Gang Member / At Dance
- Marie Newton as At Dance
- J. Waltham as In Alley

== Influence ==
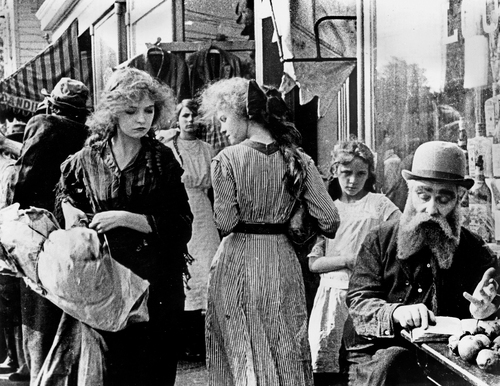
Lillian Gish in a street scene

In his book The Movie Stars, film historian Richard Griffith wrote of the scene where Lillian Gish passes another woman on the street:

Griffith's camera in this scene happened to focus on the unforgettable face of the nameless girl in the center of the shot and a murmurous wave swept audiences at this point in the film whenever it was shown. No one knows what became of this particular extra, but such raw material, and such camera accidents, became the stuff of stardom later on. Some believe the unknown extra is actually Dorothy Gish, Lillian Gish's sister. Perhaps we will never know for sure.

== See also ==
- Lionel Barrymore filmography
- Harry Carey filmography
- Lillian Gish filmography
- D. W. Griffith filmography
