= Sinful and Sweet =

1929 film by Karel Lamač

- Directed by: Carl Lamac
- Written by: Henry Koster; Hans Wilhelm
- Produced by: Victor Skutezky
- Starring: Anny Ondra; Toni Tetzlaff; Paul Rehkopf
- Cinematography: Otto Heller
- Production company: Holm Film
- Distributed by: Süd-Film
- Release date: 1 May 1929
- Country: Germany
- Languages: Silent; German intertitles

Sinful and Sweet (German: Sündig und süß) is a 1929 German silent comedy film directed by Carl Lamac and starring Anny Ondra, Toni Tetzlaff, and Paul Rehkopf.

The film's sets were designed by Heinrich Richter.

== Plot ==
As described in a film magazine, Musette is a Parisian artist's model who applies to a rich American artist seeking a subject. She has already met him and is brought to his house by his automobile. he becomes interested in her but, when he later goes to call on her, finds a baby of a neighbor in her bed. Depressed by what he believes is continental immorality, he gives her the American high hat [i.e., snubs her]. That evening he finds her at a hall where she has had a trifle too much champagne. When he accuses her of loose living, she considers committing suicide. An old professor, feeling sorry for her, takes Musette home with him. There she shocks the professor when she drinks, without knowing what it is, a bottle containing his newly discovered youth-bringing formula. The American, having seen the young woman disappear, gets the baby and brings it to the professor's apartment. The young woman is finally able to explain to the artist that the child is not hers. The professor later returns to his apartment and, finding the baby instead of the young woman, believes his serum has been a tremendous success.

== Cast ==
- Anny Ondra as Musette, ein Pariser Modell
- Toni Tetzlaff as Frau Griche
- Paul Rehkopf as Herr Griche
- Julius Falkenstein as Kurzsichtier Nachbar Musettes
- Eugen Rex as Meunier - Bildhauer
- Hans Junkermann as Mr. de Malcomte - Kunstliebhaber
- André Roanne as Joe Willings - reicher Mann aus den USA
- Teddy Bill as Gaston - Willings' Freund
- Anielka Elter as Helen - Willings' Freundin
- Adolphe Engers as Albert - Willings' Diener
- Hermann Picha as Prof. Voronoffsky - Verjüngungsdoktor
- Artur Hofer as Ein Ausländer
- Paul Morgan as Ein Ausländer

== Bibliography ==
- Bock, Hans-Michael & Bergfelder, Tim. The Concise Cinegraph: Encyclopaedia of German Cinema. Berghahn Books, 2009.
