= Anielka Elter =

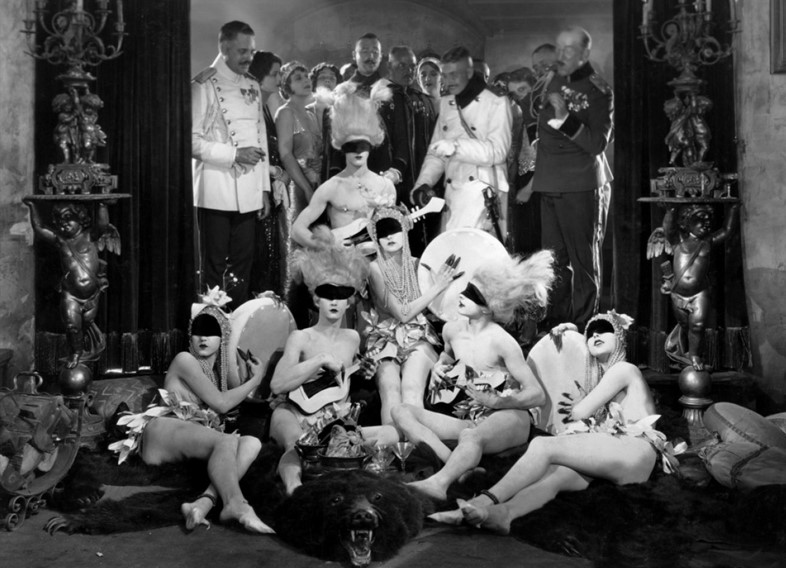
Still from The Merry Widow (1925) showing the blindfolded musicians.

Anielka Elter (1901-1958 in Kent, England) was a Czechoslovak motion picture actress who made films in Berlin, Germany and Hollywood.

== Career ==
Elter was a film star in Berlin before arriving in America from Poland. She had her first success in America with The Merry Widow (1925). She had an uncredited role as a blindfolded musician. The movie was directed by Erich Von Stroheim and starred Mae Murray, John Gilbert, and Tully Marshall.

Elter worked with film producer Sascha Kolowrat of Vienna, Austria, on several movie projects in association with the Berlin Film Manufacturing Company. She was chosen by Elinor Glyn to play the Bolshevik girl in The Only Thing (1925).

After making The Godless Girl (1929), Elter concluded her film career with three European screen productions. They are Sunding und suss (1929), Kajastus (1930), and Fantomas (1932).

== Selected filmography ==
- The Merry Widow (1925)
- Sinful and Sweet (1929)
- Fantômas (1932)
