= In Old Kentucky (1927 film) =

1927 film directed by John M. Stahl

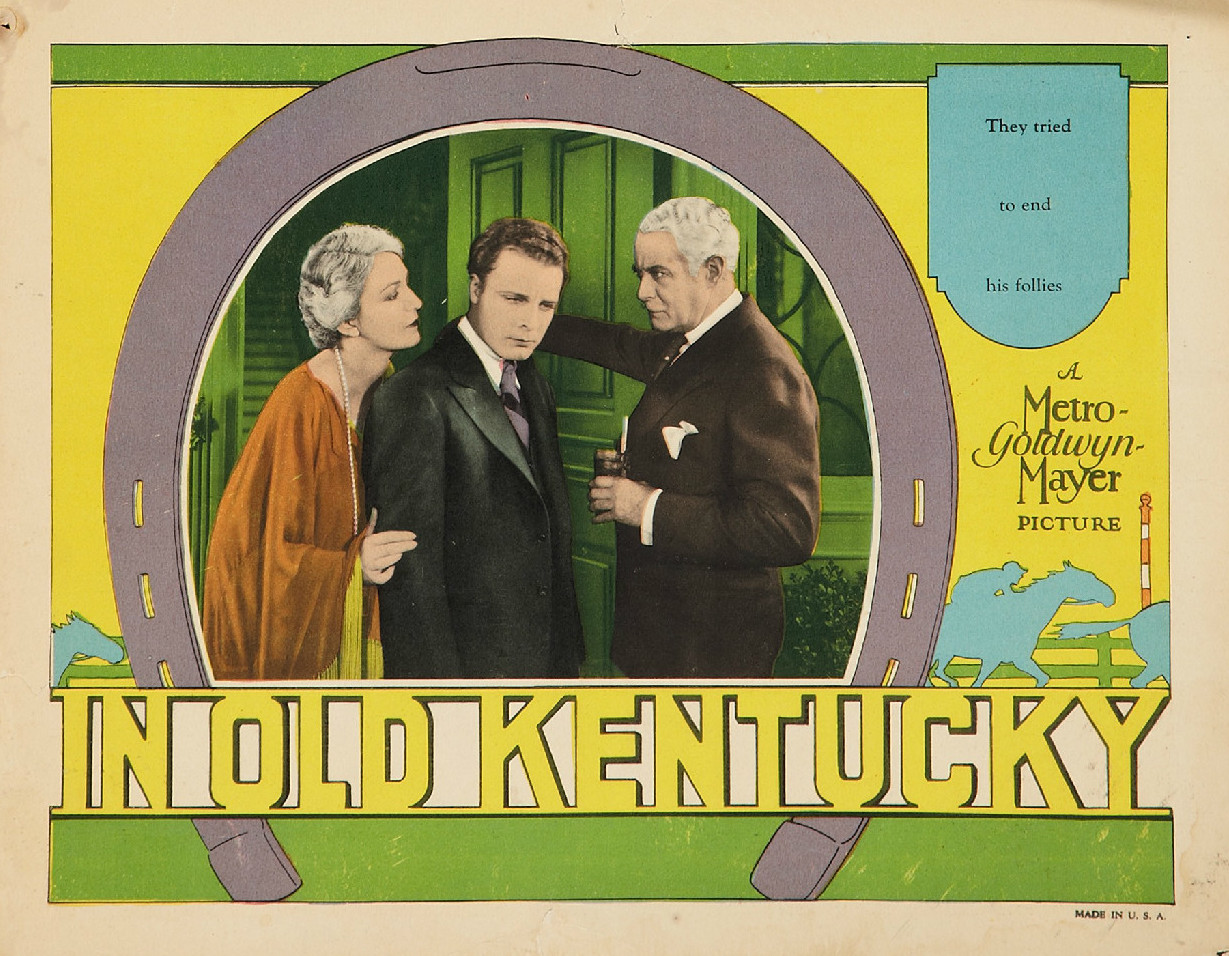
- Lobby card
- Directed by: John M. Stahl
- Written by: Lew Lipton; Marian Ainslee (titles); Ruth Cummings (titles)
- Screenplay by: A. P. Younger; Lew Lipton
- Story by: A. P. Younger
- Based on: In Old Kentucky by Charles T. Dazey
- Produced by: John M. Stahl
- Starring: Helene Costello; James Murray
- Cinematography: Max Fabian
- Edited by: Margaret Booth
- Distributed by: Metro-Goldwyn-Mayer
- Release date: November 20, 1927
- Running time: 70 minutes
- Country: United States
- Language: Silent (English intertitles)

In Old Kentucky is a 1927 American silent drama film produced and distributed by Metro-Goldwyn-Mayer and directed by John M. Stahl. The film was based on the popular 1893 play of the same name by Charles T. Dazey, and stars Helene Costello and James Murray. In Old Kentucky also features an early performance by Lincoln Perry, who later became known as Stepin Fetchit. The performance proved to be a breakthrough for Perry who signed a five-year contract with Fox Film Corporation shortly after the film's release.

The film is a remake of the 1919 film of the same name (which was M-G-M studio head Louis B. Mayer's first production as an independent producer). The play was later adapted for the screen a third time in 1935, starring Will Rogers in one of his final film appearances.

== Cast ==
- James Murray as Jimmy Brierly
- Helene Costello as Nancy Holden
- Wesley Barry as Skippy Lowry
- Dorothy Cumming as Mrs. Brierly
- Edward Martindel as Mr. Brierly
- Harvey Clark as Dan Lowry
- Stepin Fetchit as Highpockets
- Carolynne Snowden as Lily May
- Nick Cogley as Uncle Bible
- Dean Harrell (uncredited)
- Mildred Washington (uncredited)

== Censorship ==
Before the film could be exhibited in Kansas, the Kansas Board of Review required the removal of several scenes. In reel 3, scenes of boys thumbing their noses at each other, reel 4, man kissing girl on neck and breast.
