= Mathilde Brundage =

American actress

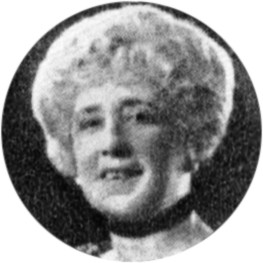
- From an ad for Hail the Woman (1921)
- Born: September 22, 1859; Louisville, Kentucky, US
- Died: May 6, 1939 (aged 79); Long Beach, California, US
- Other name: Bertha Brundage
- Occupation: Actress
- Years active: 1914–1928

Mathilde Brundage (September 22, 1859 – May 6, 1939) was an American actress. She appeared in 87 films between 1914 and 1928.

Also known as Bertha Brundage, she was born in Louisville, Kentucky. For much of her life, her family thwarted her desire to act on stage.

Brundage's film debut came in The Crucible (1914); her last film was That's My Daddy (1928).

On May 6, 1939, Brundage died in St. Mary's Hospital in Long Beach, California.

== Selected filmography ==
- A Woman's Resurrection (1915)
- A Royal Family (1915)
- Emmy of Stork's Nest (1915)
- The Beloved Vagabond (1915)
- The River of Romance (1916)
- Her Debt of Honor (1916)
- The Great Problem (1916)
- Enlighten Thy Daughter (1917)
- Bridges Burned (1917)
- The Waiting Soul (1917)
- The Soul of a Magdalen (1917)
- Wife Number Two (1917)
- Thou Shalt Not Steal (1917)
- The Little Terror (1917)
- The Slacker (1917)
- Reputation (1917)
- Raffles, the Amateur Cracksman (1917)
- Wives of Men (1918)
- Suspicion (1918)
- The Silent Woman (1918)
- The Career of Katherine Bush (1919)
- Her Game (1919)
- Three Green Eyes (1919)
- The Silent Barrier (1920)
- Dangerous Business (1920)
- The Man Who Lost Himself (1920)
- Hail the Woman (1921)
- The Unknown Wife (1921)
- The Lady from Longacre (1921)
- Lovetime (1921)
- My Boy (1921)
- No Defense (1921)
- The Rage of Paris (1921)
- The Primitive Lover (1922)
- Shirley of the Circus (1922)
- A Front Page Story (1922)
- Fashion Row (1923)
- Strangers of the Night (1923)
- Refuge (1923)
- Oh, You Tony! (1924)
- One Glorious Night (1924)
- The Charmer (1925)
- Seven Sinners (1925)
- Anything Once (1925)
- Men of the Night (1926)
- The Midnight Message (1926)
- Racing Romance (1926)
- Love Me and the World Is Mine (1927)
- Silver Comes Through (1927)
- Tongues of Scandal (1927)
- That's My Daddy (1928)
