= Daddies (film) =

1924 film directed by William A. Seiter

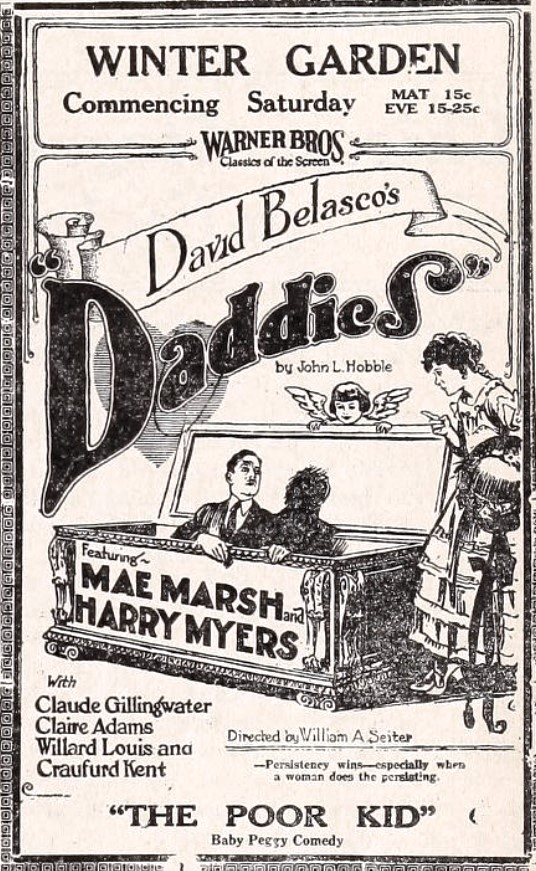
- Advertisement
- Directed by: William A. Seiter
- Written by: Julien Josephson
- Based on: Daddies (1918 play) by John L. Hobble
- Starring: Mae Marsh; Harry Myers; Claude Gillingwater; Willard Louis
- Cinematography: John Stumar
- Production company: Warner Bros.
- Distributed by: Warner Bros.
- Release date: February 9, 1924; (limited release)
- Running time: 7 reels (6,500 - 6,800 feet)
- Country: United States
- Language: Silent (English intertitles)
- Budget: $223,000
- Box office: $407,000

Daddies is a 1924 American silent romantic comedy film produced and distributed by Warner Bros. and directed by William A. Seiter. The film stars Mae Marsh and Harry Myers and survives today in 16mm format. It was transferred onto 16 mm film by Associated Artists Productions/United Artists in the 1950s and shown on television.

== Plot ==
As described in a review in a film magazine, at a reunion of a bachelors' club the five remaining members are shocked at the defection of one of their number, who pays his forfeit to get married. Another receives a letter that his chum, about to die, has left him his little girl, and the other three are persuaded to also adopt war orphans. Robert Audrey finds his in an eighteen-year-old girl, Ruth; old James Crockett, who grudgingly accepts a boy, really gets a little girl, while Allen finds three boys, triplets, have been awarded to him. These kiddies gradually work themselves into the affections of their foster parents until each one marries to provide a "mother" for the children. Finally Robert finds that he loves his "orphan", Ruth, and marries her, and the club goes to smash.

== Cast ==
- Mae Marsh as Ruth Atkins
- Harry Myers as Robert Audrey
- Claude Gillingwater as James Crockett
- Crauford Kent as William Rivers
- Claire Adams as Bobette Audrey
- Willard Louis as Henry Allen
- Boyce Combe as Nicholson Walters
- Georgia Woodthorpe as Mrs. Audrey
- Otto Hoffman as Parker
- Priscilla Moran as Alice
- Charles De Briac as Triplet
- Raymond De Briac as Triplet
- King Evers as Triplet
- Milla Davenport as Katie
- Muriel Frances Dana as Lorrie

== Box office ==
According to Warner Bros records, the film earned $367,000 domestically and $40,000 in foreign markets.
