= The Struggle Everlasting =

1918 film directed by James Kirkwood Sr.

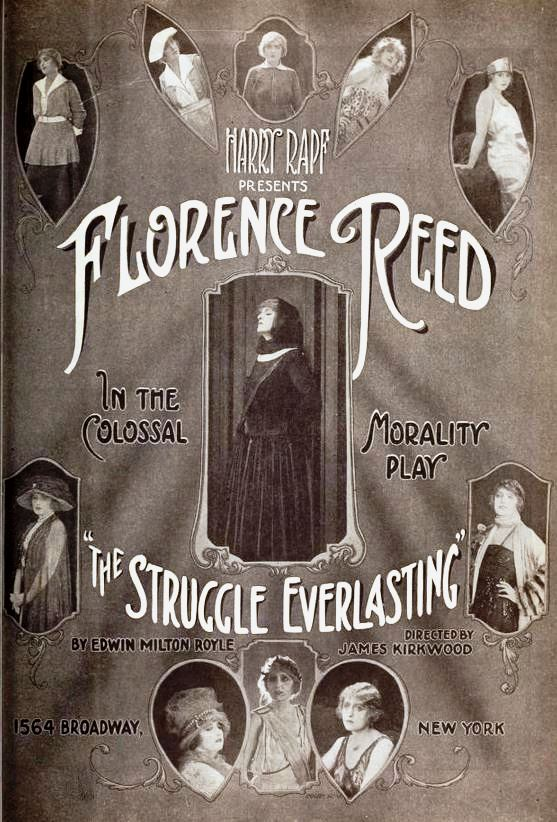
- poster front
- Directed by: James Kirkwood
- Written by: Benet Musson
- Based on: The Struggle Everlasting by Edward Milton Royle
- Produced by: Harry Rapf; High Art Productions
- Starring: Florence Reed
- Cinematography: Lawrence E. Williams
- Production companies: Harry Rapf Productions, High Art Productions Inc.
- Distributed by: Arrow Film Corporation; States Rights
- Release date: April 1918
- Running time: 7 reels
- Country: United States
- Language: Silent (English intertitles)

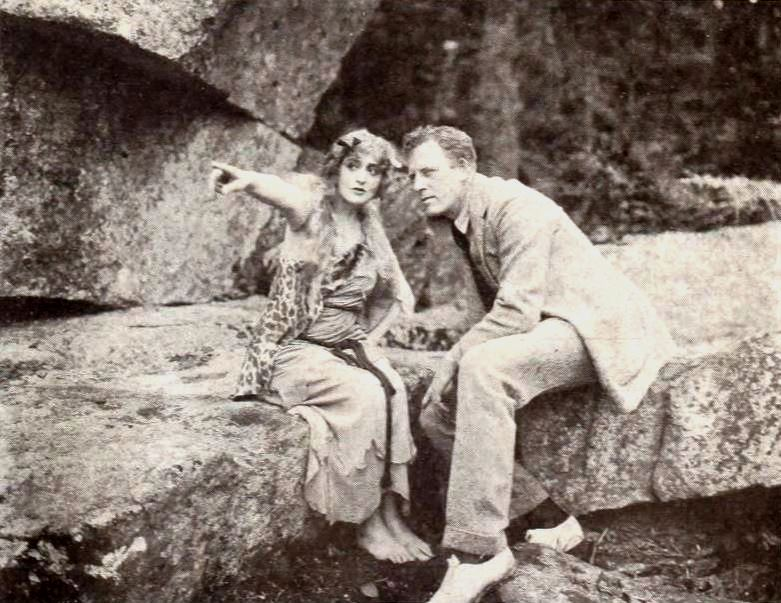
Florence Reed and director James Kirkwood Sr.

The Struggle Everlasting is a 1918 American silent allegorical drama film directed by James Kirkwood, Sr. and starring stage star Florence Reed. It is based on a 1907 play, The Struggle Everlasting, by Edward Milton Royle.

== Cast ==
- Florence Reed as Body, aka Lois
- Milton Sills as Mind, aka Bruce
- Irving Cummings as Soul, aka Dean
- Wellington Playter as Champion Pugilist, aka Bob Dempsey
- E. J. Ratcliffe as A Banker
- Edwin N. Hoyt as Worldly Wise, aka Dr. Brandt
- Fred C. Jones as Musician, aka Pierre Viron
- Albert Hall as Class Poet
- Richard Hattera as Aristocrat, aka Ned Coign
- Margaret Pitt as A Wife
- Mildred Cheshire as Frail Sister
- George Cooper as Slimy Thing

== Reception ==
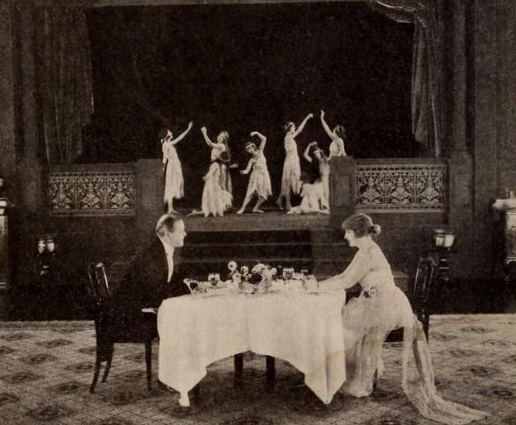
Scene from film.

The film industry created the National Association of the Motion Picture Industry (NAMPI) in 1916 in an effort to preempt censorship by states and municipalities, and it used a list of subjects called the "Thirteen Points" which film plots were to avoid. The Struggle Everlasting, with its white slavery plot line, is an example of a film that clearly violated the Thirteen Points and yet was still distributed. Since the NAMPI was ineffective, it was replaced in 1922.

Like many American films of the time, The Struggle Everlasting was also subject to restrictions and cuts by city and state film censorship boards. For example, the Chicago Board of Censors cut, in Reel 1, the scene of woman apparently nude to include all scenes of bather up to point where she puts a garb over herself, Reel 4, closeup of women in one-piece bathing suits at pool, and, Reel 6, vision showing woman soliciting.

== Preservation ==
With no copies of The Struggle Everlasting listed as being held in any film archives, it is a lost film.
