= Georgia Woodthorpe =

American actress (1859–1927)

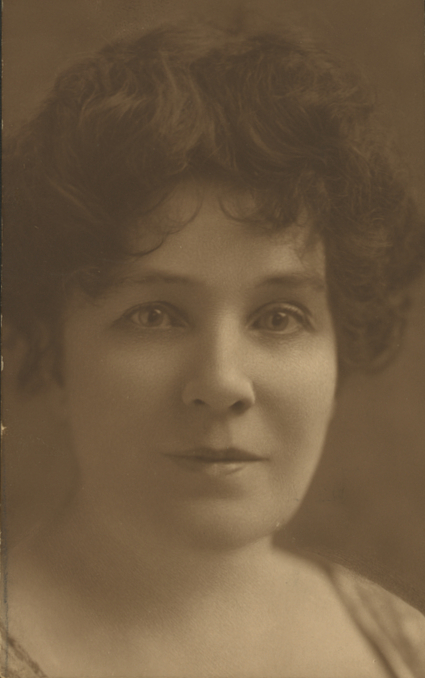
- Born: October 11, 1859; California
- Died: August 25, 1927 (aged 67); Glendale
- Spouse(s): Fred A. Cooper
- Children: Georgie Cooper, Olive Cooper, Edith Cooper, Harry H. Cooper

Georgia Woodthorpe Cooper Wallace (October 11, 1859 – August 25, 1927) was an American stage and film actress.

Georgia Woodthorpe was born on October 11, 1859 in California. Her stage career began when she was a child. She was the youngest actress to star as Ophelia opposite the famous actor Edwin Booth in Hamlet. She was the female lead in a number of productions, including The Danites (1894) and The Canuck (1894). She also appeared with Otis Skinner in Kismet and Florence Roberts in Zaza (1905).

She also appeared in a number of silent films, including the 18-part Universal serial film The Midnight Man (1919) and The Four Horsemen of the Apocalypse (1921),

Georgia Woodthorpe died on 25 August 1927 in Glendale, California.

== Personal life ==
Woodthorpe married actor Fred Cooper and they had four children, cinematographer Harry Cooper, screenwriter Olive Cooper Curtis, Georgia Cooper Stevens, and Edith Cooper Carrer. She married William T. Wallace in 1920.

== Filmography ==
- Kultur, 1918
- Better Times, 1919
- The Midnight Man (serial), 1919
- The Old Maid's Baby, 1919
- Madame Peacock, 1920
- Merely Mary Ann, 1920
- Rose of Nome, 1920
- The Four Horsemen of the Apocalypse, 1921
- Bunty Pulls the Strings, 1921
- The Song of Life, 1922
- Gimme, 1923
- Thundering Dawn, 1923
- Roughed Lips, 1923
- Daddies, 1924
