= Elmer Booth =

American actor (1882–1915)

- Booth as Jack Doogan in the 1913 play Stop Thief!
- Born: William Elmer Booth; December 9, 1882; Los Angeles, California, U.S.
- Died: June 16, 1915 (aged 32); Los Angeles, California, U.S.
- Occupations: Stage and film actor
- Years active: 1901–1915
- Spouse: Irene Outtrim (m. 1908)
- Children: 1
- Relatives: Margaret Booth (sister)

William Elmer Booth (December 9, 1882 – June 16, 1915) was an American stage and film actor. He was born in Los Angeles, California and was the elder brother of Margaret Booth, a film editor for Hollywood productions for nearly 70 years.

== Career ==
Elmer began acting in touring stock companies as a teenager and achieved great success in the stock company at the Central Theater in San Francisco from 1903 to 1906. Between 1910 and 1915 he starred in 40 movies; one of those was D. W. Griffith's The Musketeers of Pig Alley (1912), cited by many film experts as the first gangster movie.

Playing "The Snapper Kid", a Manhattan street tough engaged in a turf war on the Lower East Side, Booth interpreted the gangster as a cocky, entertaining antihero, far different from the standard teeth-gnashing movie bad guys of his time.

== Death ==
In the early hours of June 16, 1915, Booth died in an accident in California while riding in a car driven by Tod Browning, an actor and new director with Reliance-Majestic Studios in Hollywood. Actor George Siegmann was also a passenger in Browning's car. The day after the accident, the Los Angeles Times reported that the three men were returning to downtown Los Angeles from a roadhouse when Browning's car crashed into a train of the Salt Lake Railroad:

Elmer Booth was killed instantly. The motor car in which he was speeding towards Los Angeles with his two companions rammed the rear part of a flat car loaded with steel rails at Santa Fe avenue and Salt Lake tracks early yesterday morning. The conductor of the train, Harry Jones, approaching, had waved his lantern as a danger signal, and then had come to the crash that sent Elmer Booth, who was just realizing his dramatic ambitions, headforemost into the rails.

Browning and Siegmann survived, although they both suffered serious injuries. Later reports blamed the accident on heavy fog; nevertheless, Elmer's sister Margaret never forgave Browning for the loss of her brother.

D. W. Griffith, who had planned to cast Booth in an important role in Intolerance, delivered the actor's graveside eulogy.

== Personal life ==
Booth married actress Irene Outtrim in 1908. That same year, their son was born, but the son died of pneumonia in March 1910.

== Selected filmography ==
- A Beast at Bay (1912)
- An Unseen Enemy (1912)
- The Musketeers of Pig Alley (1912)
- Gold and Glitter (1912)
- The Adopted Brother (1913)
- Mrs. Black is Back (1914)
- Gasoline Gus (1915)
- A Chase by Moonlight (1915)
