= Frances Irene Reels =

American screenwriter

- Born: Frances Irene Reel; September 29, 1892; Smithville, Mississippi, USA
- Died: November 10, 1926 (aged 34); Los Angeles, California, USA
- Occupation(s): Screenwriter, actress
- Spouse: John M. Stahl

Frances Irene Reels, also known as Irene Reels (1892–1926), was an American screenwriter and stage actress active during Hollywood's silent era. She was married to director John M. Stahl.

== Biography ==
Frances was born in Smithville, Mississippi, to Emmett Reel and Marie Underhill. She began acting and singing at a young age, and appeared in traveling productions as a teenager.

She married John M. Stahl in 1918, and the two collaborated on a number of films, with Stahl directing and Reels writing the stories.

She died unexpectedly on November 10, 1926, after undergoing surgery. She was 34.

== Selected filmography ==
- Husbands and Lovers (1924)
- The Dangerous Age (1923)
- The Song of Life (1922)
- The Woman in His House (1920)
- Her Code of Honor (1919)
