= Isadore Rush =

American actress (1866–1904)

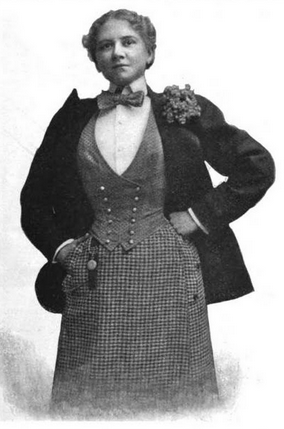
- Isadore Rush, from an 1897 publication, in costume for The Politician.
- Born: c. 1866; Berwick, Pennsylvania
- Died: November 14, 1904 (aged 37–38); San Diego, California
- Resting place: Woodlawn Cemetery, The Bronx, New York
- Occupation: Actress
- Years active: 1889–1904
- Spouse: Roland Reed
- Children: Florence Reed (stepdaughter)

Isadore Rush (c. 1866 – November 14, 1904) was an American stage actress who performed in vaudeville and on Broadway.

Rush was born in Berwick, Pennsylvania. She was married to comedian Roland Reed, making her a stepmother of actress Florence Reed. Previously she was married to a man named White and by him had a daughter, Maud White, who was a young stage actress at the time of Rush's death and married to actor Tyrone Power.

Rush drowned off San Diego near the beach at the Hotel del Coronado in November 1904.
