= Wives of Men =

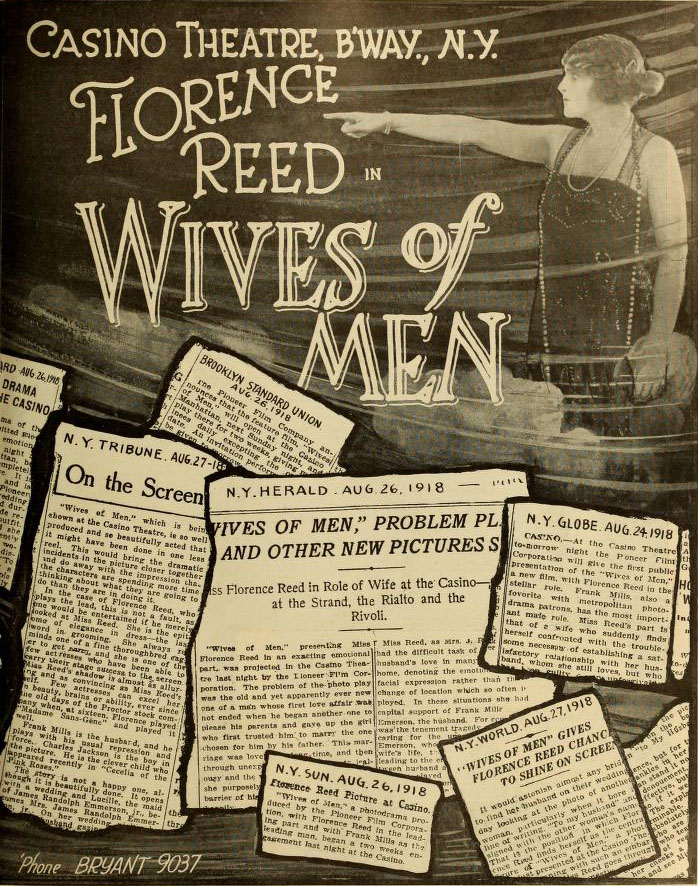
- period advertising
- Directed by: John M. Stahl
- Written by: John M. Stahl (story & screenplay); Tom Bret (intertitles)
- Produced by: Grace Davison
- Starring: Florence Reed; Frank R. Mills; Mr. Wokoff
- Cinematography: Harry Fischbeck
- Production company: Grace Davison Productions
- Distributed by: Pioneer Film Company
- Release date: August 1918
- Running time: 7 reels
- Country: United States
- Language: Silent (English intertitles)

Wives of Men is a 1918 American silent drama film directed by John M. Stahl and starring Florence Reed. Stahl also wrote the screenplay with movie being produced by Grace Davison, who has a role in the film.

== Cast ==
- Florence Reed as Lucille Emerson
- Frank R. Mills as James Randolph Emerson Jr (*this Frank Mills, a stage actor born 1870 died 1921)
- Mr. Wokoff as James Randolph Emerson Sr.
- Mathilde Brundage as Mrs. James Randolph Emerson Sr.
- Edgar Lewis as Jim Hawkins
- Charles Jackson as Charlie
- Grace Davison as Grace
- Bessie Mar English as Mary
- Robert Lee Keeling as Paul Harrison

== Preservation status ==
This film is now considered a lost film.
