= The Marriage Clause =

1926 film by Lois Weber

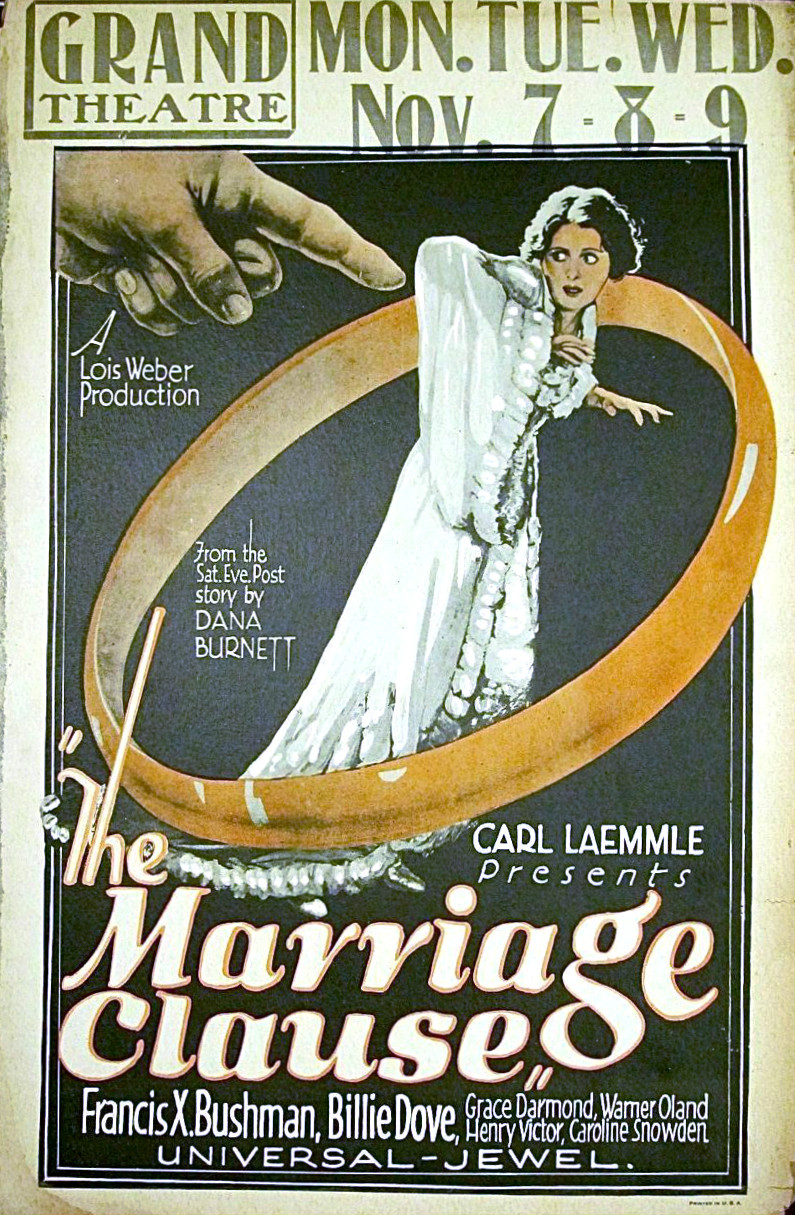
- Window poster
- Directed by: Lois Weber
- Written by: Lois Weber
- Based on: short story Technic by Dana Burnet
- Produced by: Carl Laemmle
- Starring: Francis X. Bushman; Billie Dove; Warner Oland
- Cinematography: Hal Mohr
- Production company: Universal-Jewel
- Distributed by: Universal-Jewel
- Release date: September 12, 1926
- Running time: 80 minutes
- Country: United States
- Languages: Silent film (English intertitles)

The Marriage Clause is a 1926 silent film drama directed by Lois Weber and starring Francis X. Bushman and Billie Dove. It was produced and released by Universal Pictures. The film marked a return to directing for Weber, who had taken a break for a few years.

The film—based on Dana Burnet's Saturday Evening Post short story titled Technic—takes a look behind the scenes of a play, honing in on a young starlet named Sylvia (Dove) and her director, Barry (Bushman).

== Cast ==
- Francis X. Bushman as Barry Townsend
- Billie Dove as Sylvia Jordan
- Warner Oland as Max Ravenal
- Henri La Garde as Doctor
- Grace Darmond as Mildred Le Blanc
- Caroline Snowden as Pansy
- Oscar Smith as Sam
- André Cheron as Critic
- Robert Dudley as Secretary
- Charles Meakin as Stage Manager

== Preservation ==
The film survives in a "shortened" version which is held by the Library of Congress.
