= The Merry Widow (1925 film) =

1925 film directed by Erich von Stroheim

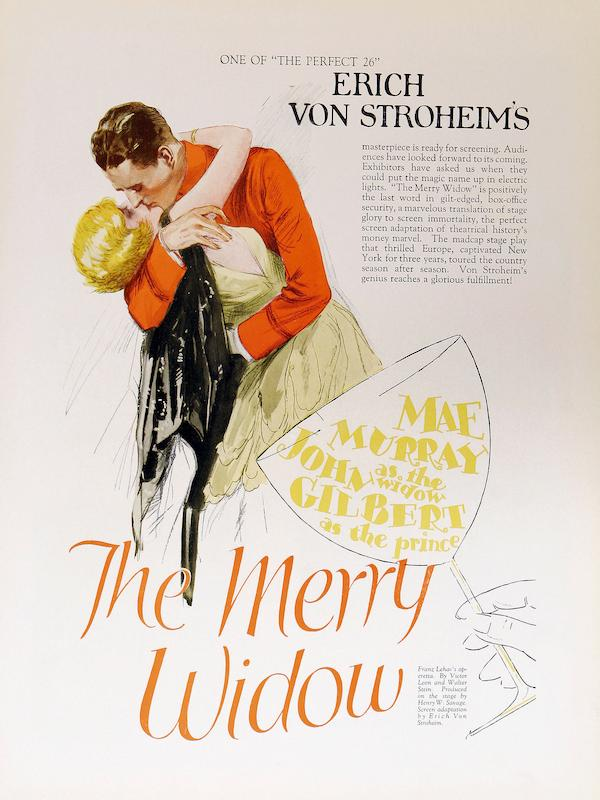
- Directed by: Erich von Stroheim
- Written by: Erich von Stroheim; Benjamin Glazer
- Based on: The Merry Widow; 1905 operetta by Franz Lehár Victor Léon (libretto); Leo Stein (libretto)
- Produced by: Erich von Stroheim; Irving Thalberg (uncredited)
- Starring: Mae Murray; John Gilbert; Roy D'Arcy; Tully Marshall
- Cinematography: Oliver T. Marsh; William H. Daniels
- Edited by: Frank E. Hull; Margaret Booth (uncredited)
- Music by: William Axt (uncredited); David Mendoza (uncredited); Franz Lehár (non-original music)
- Distributed by: Metro-Goldwyn-Mayer
- Release date: August 26, 1925
- Running time: 137 minutes
- Country: United States
- Language: Silent (English intertitles)
- Budget: $592,000
- Box office: $1.933 million (worldwide rentals)

The Merry Widow (1925)

The Merry Widow is a 1925 American silent romantic drama, black comedy film directed and written by Erich von Stroheim. Released by Metro-Goldwyn-Mayer, the film stars Mae Murray, John Gilbert, Roy D'Arcy, and Tully Marshall, with pre-fame uncredited appearances by Joan Crawford and Clark Gable. The film is based on Franz Lehár's 1905 operetta of the same name, and was its second film adaptation, the first being a 1918 Hungarian film directed by Michael Curtiz.

== Plot ==
As described in film magazine reviews, Prince Danilo meets Sally the dancer and, when he proposes marriage, his uncle, King Nikita I of Monteblanco and Queen Milena object because she is a commoner. Sally marries Baron Sadoja, an old wealthy roue who later dies from a stroke. Prince Danilo’s parents now encourage the marriage. A slurring remark is the cause of a duel between the cousins and Danilo is wounded, sacrificing his cousin whom he believes Sally loves. Crown Prince Mirko is assassinated and Danilo becomes heir to the throne. Sally visits Danilo at the hospital and asks him to marry her.

== Cast ==
- Mae Murray as Sally O'Hara
- John Gilbert as Prince Danilo Petrovich
- Roy D'Arcy as Crown Prince Mirko
- Josephine Crowell as Queen Milena
- George Fawcett as King Nikita I
- Tully Marshall as Baron Sixtus Sadoja
- Edward Connelly as Baron Popoff (ambassador)

=== Uncredited ===
Selected cast that were uncredited:

- Helen Howard Beaumont as Chorus girl
- Gertrude Bennett as Hard-Boiled Virginia
- Bernard Berger as Boy
- Sidney Bracey as Danilo's footman
- Estelle Clark as French barber
- Albert Conti as Danilo's adjutant
- D'Arcy Corrigan as Horatio
- Joan Crawford as Extra
- Xavier Cugat as Orchestra leader
- Anielka Elter as Blindfolded musician
- Dale Fuller as Sadoja's chambermaid
- Clark Gable as Ballroom dancing extra
- Edna Tichenor as Dopey Marie
- Zalla Zarana as Frenchie Christine
- Edna Simms as Ballroom dancing extra

== Production ==
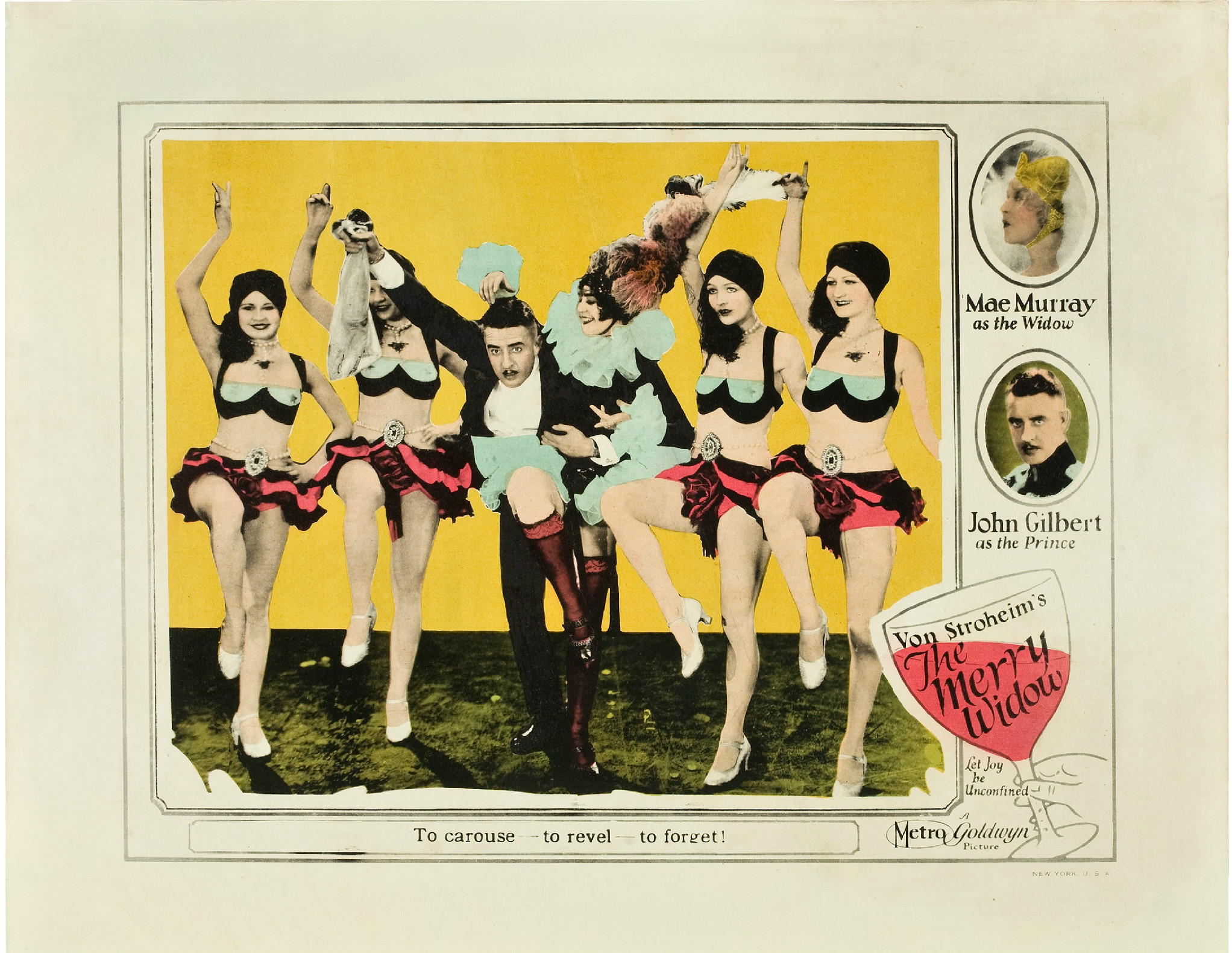
Alternate poster.

“Though Stroheim and Mae Murray hated each other, the performance which he got from her in The Merry Widow was worth everything else she ever did put together.”— Edward Wagenknecht in The Movies in the Age of Innocence (1962).

The film was shot over twelve weeks with a budget of $592,000. Filming was tense as Mae Murray and the film's director, Erich von Stroheim, did not get on well. After production, Metro-Goldwyn-Mayer decided it could no longer work with the director after he added sexually explicit scenes and changed the operetta's libretto.

== Reception ==
Upon its release, the film was both a critical and box office success. Critics praised Murray's dramatic skills while also noting that von Stroheim had "made an actress out of Miss Murray". According to MGM records The Merry Widow took in approximately $1.081 million in theater rentals from the United States and Canada, an additional $852,000 from foreign rentals, and earned a profit of $758,000.

== Other adaptations ==
The Merry Widow was adapted for the screen in 1934, 1952, 1962, and 1994.

== See also ==
- List of early color feature films

== Works cited ==
- Wagenknecht, Edward. 1962. The Movies in the Age of Innocence. University of Oklahoma Press, Norman, Oklahoma.
