= Suspicion (1918 film) =

- Directed by: John M. Stahl
- Written by: Thomas Bedding
- Produced by: M. H. Hoffman
- Starring: Grace Davison; Warren Cook; Mathilde Brundage
- Production company: M.H. Hoffman Productions
- Distributed by: States Rights
- Release date: November 1918
- Running time: 60 minutes
- Country: United States
- Languages: Silent; English intertitles

Suspicion is a 1918 American silent drama film directed by John M. Stahl and starring Grace Davison, Warren Cook and Mathilde Brundage. It is now presumed to be a lost film.

== Plot summary ==
Dr. Allen Forrest, who works on aircraft production for the U.S. government, invites his nephew and business partner, Leonard White, to live with him and his wife, Madelyn Forrest. Soon after, idle gossip begins to swirl, hinting at an improper relationship between Leonard and Madelyn.

At first, Allen dismisses these rumors, but his doubts gradually grow. One night, he hears a disturbance in Madelyn’s room and rushes in, only to be shot in the arm. At the same time, he sees a young man leaping from Madelyn's balcony, and that figure bears a striking resemblance to Leonard.

Convinced of his wife's betrayal, Allen accuses her of infidelity. Distraught and on the verge of taking her life, Madelyn contemplates suicide, until a secret service agent arrives with news: the attacker was in fact a German spy, captured after infiltrating the Forrest home and attempting to steal critical documents for the war effort .

== Cast ==
- Grace Davison as Madelyn Forrest
- Warren Cook as Dr. Allen Forrest
- John Merkyl as Leonard White
- Mathilde Brundage as Mrs. Pennington
- Alma Dore as Olive Pennington
- John O'Keefe as James Burns

== Bibliography ==
- Bruce Babington & Charles Barr. The Call of the Heart: John M. Stahl and Hollywood Melodrama. Indiana University Press, 2018.
