= The Midnight Man (1919 film) =

1919 film

- Theatrical poster to The Midnight Man (1919)
- Directed by: James W. Horne
- Written by: Frank Howard Clark; Harvey Gates; James W. Horne
- Starring: James J. Corbett; Kathleen O'Connor
- Distributed by: Universal Film Manufacturing Co.
- Release date: September 1, 1919
- Running time: 18 episodes
- Country: United States
- Language: Silent (English intertitles)

The Midnight Man is a 1919 American film serial directed by James W. Horne. It is now considered to be a lost film.

== Plot ==
As described in a film magazine, Bob Gilmore (Corbett), a young Washington clubman, pleads guilty to his foster father's forgery and becomes a fugitive from justice. As he is about to leave, he learns that his supposed parents adopted him from a foundling society. His only clue to his identity is some baby clothing and a ring. While escaping from the city, he is set upon by the White Circle gang of thieves who throw him in front of a train. He miraculously escapes from death and reaches New York City. While robbing a barroom, one of the thieves is killed and the police, finding Gilmore's jewelry on the body, believe that he is dead. Gilmore then takes the name Stevens and breaks into the homes of the wealthy at midnight in an attempt to learn his identity. At each place he takes nothing of value but leaves an impression of his ring in an effort to trace his parents. He has occasion to rescue a pretty young woman from thugs and finds she is the daughter of a wealthy man named Morgan. Morgan (Girard), it develops, is the leader of the White Circle gang. Gilmore is also being followed by a mysterious Hindu, and is being tracked by Detective Arnold (Singleton). Gilmore in the episodes is frequently called upon to display his boxing abilities in rough and tumble fights, and often takes daring athletic feats during his quest to discover his identity.

== Cast ==
- James J. Corbett as Bob Gilmore
- Kathleen O'Connor as Nell
- Joseph W. Girard as Morgan
- Frank Jonasson as John Gilmore
- Joseph Singleton as Detective Arnold
- Orrall Humphrey as Ramah
- Georgia Woodthorpe as Martha
- William Sauter as Hargreaves
- Noble Johnson as "Spike"
- Sam Polo
- Montgomery Carlyle
- Ann Forrest

== List of episodes ==
1. Cast Adrift
2. Deadly Enemies
3. Ten Thousand Dollars Reward
4. At Bay
5. Unmasked
6. The Elevator Mystery
7. The Electric Foe
8. Shadow of Fear
9. The Society Hold-Up
10. The Blazing Torch
11. The Death Ride
12. The Tunnel of Terror
13. A Fight to the Finish
14. The Jaws of Death
15. The Wheel of Terror
16. Hurled From the Heights
17. The Cave of Destruction
18. A Wild Finish

== See also ==
- List of film serials
- List of film serials by studio
- List of lost films
