= Atonement (1919 film) =

1919 silent film by William Humphrey

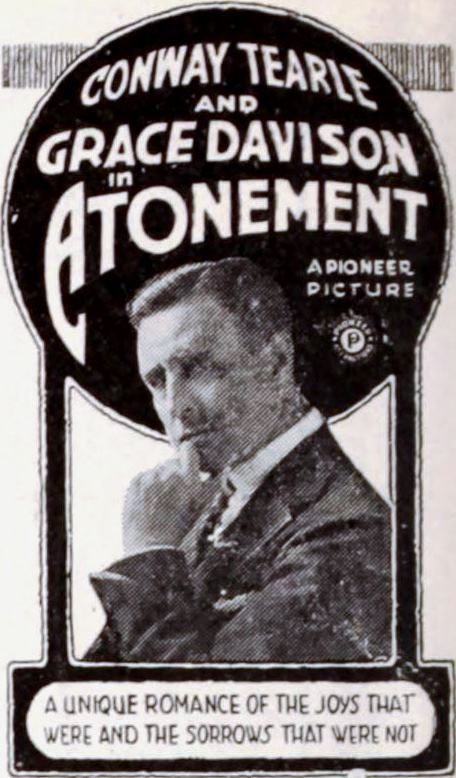
- Directed by: William Humphrey
- Written by: William Humphrey; George Edwardes-Hall
- Based on: The Living Corpse by Leo Tolstoy
- Produced by: William Humphrey
- Starring: Grace Davison; Conway Tearle; Huntley Gordon
- Cinematography: Tony Gaudio
- Production company: Humphrey Pictures
- Distributed by: Pioneer Film Corporation
- Release date: September 1919
- Running time: 50 minutes
- Country: United States
- Languages: Silent; English intertitles

Atonement is a 1919 American silent drama film directed by William Humphrey and starring Grace Davison, Conway Tearle and Huntley Gordon.

== Cast ==
- Grace Davison as Laura Hamilton
- Conway Tearle as Theodore Proctor
- Huntley Gordon as Vincent Carlton
- Sally Crute as Sarah Hamilton
- Tony Merlo as James Proctor
- Gretchen Hartman as Marcia
- Jean Del Val as Tony
- Arthur Donaldson as Anselmo

== Bibliography ==
- Goble, Alan. The Complete Index to Literary Sources in Film. Walter de Gruyter, 1999.
