= Benjamin Glazer =

Screenwriter, producer, foley artist, and director of American films

Benjamin F. Glazer
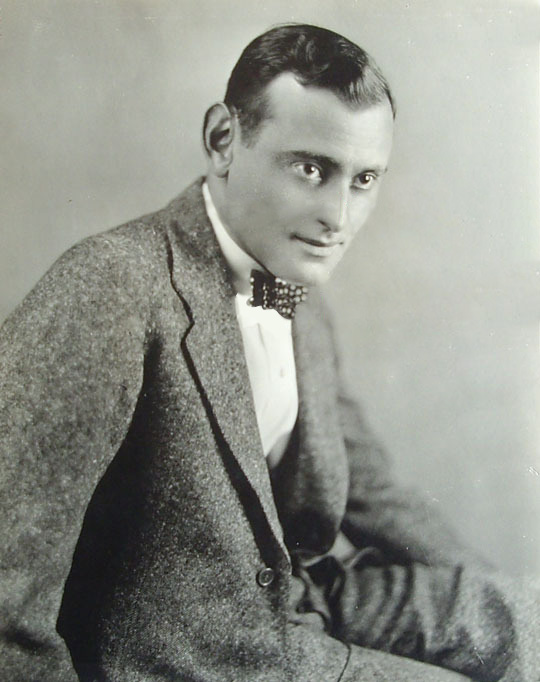
- Glazer in a photograph taken before September 1927
- Born: May 7, 1887; Belfast, Ireland
- Died: March 18, 1956 (aged 68); Hollywood, Los Angeles, California, U.S.A.
- Education: University of Pennsylvania Law School, (University of Pennsylvania) in Philadelphia, Pennsylvania
- Occupations: Screenwriter, translator, producer, Foley artist, film director
- Spouse: Sharon Lynn (m. 1932)

Benjamin F. Glazer (May 7, 1887 – March 18, 1956) was a screenwriter, producer, Foley artist, and director of American films from the 1920s through the 1950s. He made the first translation of author / playwright Ferenc Molnár's play Liliom (1909) into English from its original Hungarian (Magyar) in 1921. His translation was used in the first American live stage play performance that year and later in the subsequent 1930 film version, and in every production in English of the play for the 115 years since its 1909 writing until recently. It also served as the basis for the libretto for Rodgers and Hammerstein's Carousel, as well as for Phoebe and Henry Ephron's screenplay for the 1956 film version.

Glazer was born in Belfast, Northern Ireland / Ulster, United Kingdom, into a Hungarian Jewish family. After crossing the Atlantic Ocean and moving to the United States, in the early 20th century, he moved south to Philadelphia, Pennsylvania, studied at the University of Pennsylvania Law School, and passed the Pennsylvania bar exam to practice and become a lawyer in 1906.

Glazer was one of the founding members of the Academy of Motion Picture Arts and Sciences, which began awarding Academy Awards (Oscars) in 1927. He is best known for his Oscar-winning writing for 7th Heaven (1927) in the academy's first awards ceremony and Arise, My Love (1940). Additional screenwriting credits extended from the silent film era (1896-1927), and into the subsequent period of the sound films (also known as "talkies", generally increasingly after 1927). They include The Merry Widow, Flesh and the Devil, Mata Hari, A Farewell to Arms, We're Not Dressing, and Tortilla Flat.

Glazer also directed one film, the 1948 Song of My Heart, a highly fictionalized biography (Biopic) of the famous Russian classical music composer Tchaikovsky.

Glazer was married to actress Sharon Lynn, who had her own film career.

He died of circulatory failure in Hollywood at the age of 68.

== Selected filmography ==
(as screenwriter unless otherwise noted)

- Sinners in Silk (1924)
- The Great Divide (1924)
- Fine Clothes (1925)
- The Merry Widow (1925)
- Memory Lane (1926)
- The Gay Deceiver (1926)
- Wild Oats Lane (1926)
- Flesh and the Devil (1926)
- The Lady in Ermine (1927)
- 7th Heaven (1927)
- Paid to Love (1927)
- The Trail of '98 (1928)
- Beggars of Life (1928)
- The Boudoir Diplomat (1930)
- The Devil to Pay! (1930)
- Liliom (1930)
- Pagan Lady (1931)
- Mata Hari (1931)
- Monsieur Albert (1932)
- A Farewell to Arms (1932)
- No Man Of Her Own (1932)
- The Way to Love (1933)
- We're Not Dressing (1934)
- She Loves Me Not (1934) (also producer)
- Rhythm on the Range (1934) (also producer)
- Four Daughters (1938) (assoc. producer)
- Going Places (1938) (assoc. producer)
- Yes, My Darling Daughter (1939) (assoc. producer)
- They Made Me a Criminal (1939) (assoc. producer)
- Arise, My Love (1940) (story)
- Paris Calling (1941)
- Tortilla Flat (1942)
- Song of My Heart (1948) (also director)
- Carousel (1955) (libretto)
