= Her Code of Honor =

1919 film by John M. Stahl

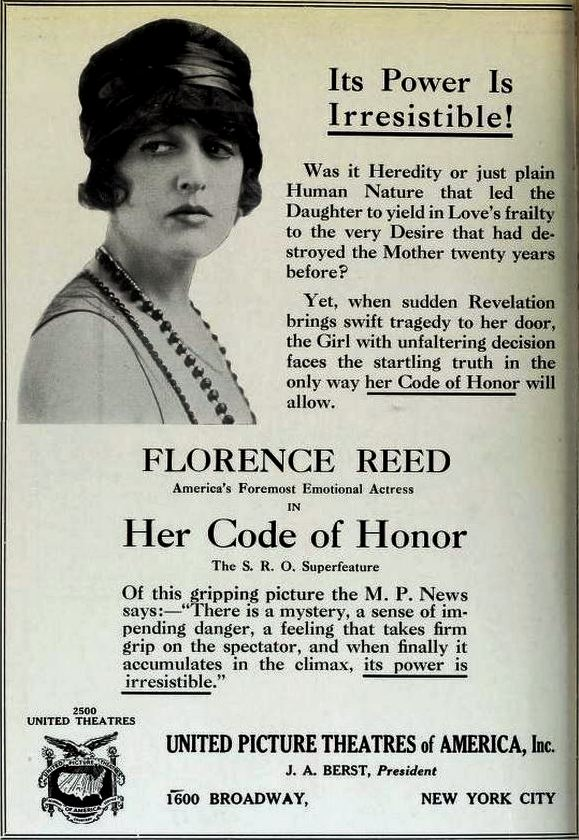
- Advertisement
- Directed by: John M. Stahl
- Written by: Frances Irene Reels
- Produced by: Tribune Productions
- Starring: Florence Reed; William Desmond; Eugene La Salle: Robert Frazer
- Cinematography: Harry Fischbeck
- Distributed by: United Picture Theatres of America Inc.
- Release date: April 6, 1919
- Running time: 6 reels
- Country: United States
- Language: Silent (English intertitles)

Her Code of Honor is a 1919 American silent drama film directed by John M. Stahl and starring Florence Reed. Its alternate title was The Call of the Heart. A print of it is held by the British Film Institute's National Film and Television Archive in London.

== Plot ==
As described in a film magazine, Alice (Reed), who innocently uses a surname not her own, becomes engaged to Eugene La Salle (Desmond), whom she meets following an automobile accident. He attends a house party at the home of her benefactor Tom Davis (Francis), a man whose love for her mother Helen (Reed) allowed him to raise her from babyhood. On a moonlit night the passion between Alice and Eugene overcomes their patience. Eugene goes abroad for a few months and on his return finds that Alice is pregnant. They agree to be married the next day. However, by reason of the ring from his father Jacques (Cummings) which he exhibits, a duplicate of one left to Alice by her mother Helen, it appears that they are half-brother and sister. She asks Eugene to shoot her and just before he does they learn that he is an adopted son of his father. They then decide to get married as planned.

== Cast ==
- Florence Reed as Helen / Alice
- William Desmond as Eugene La Salle
- Robert Frazer as Richard Bentham
- Irving Cummings as Jacques
- Alec B. Francis as Tom Davis
- Marcelle Roussillon as Jane
- George Stevens (undetermined role)
