= The Woman in His House (1920 film) =

1920 film by John M. Stahl

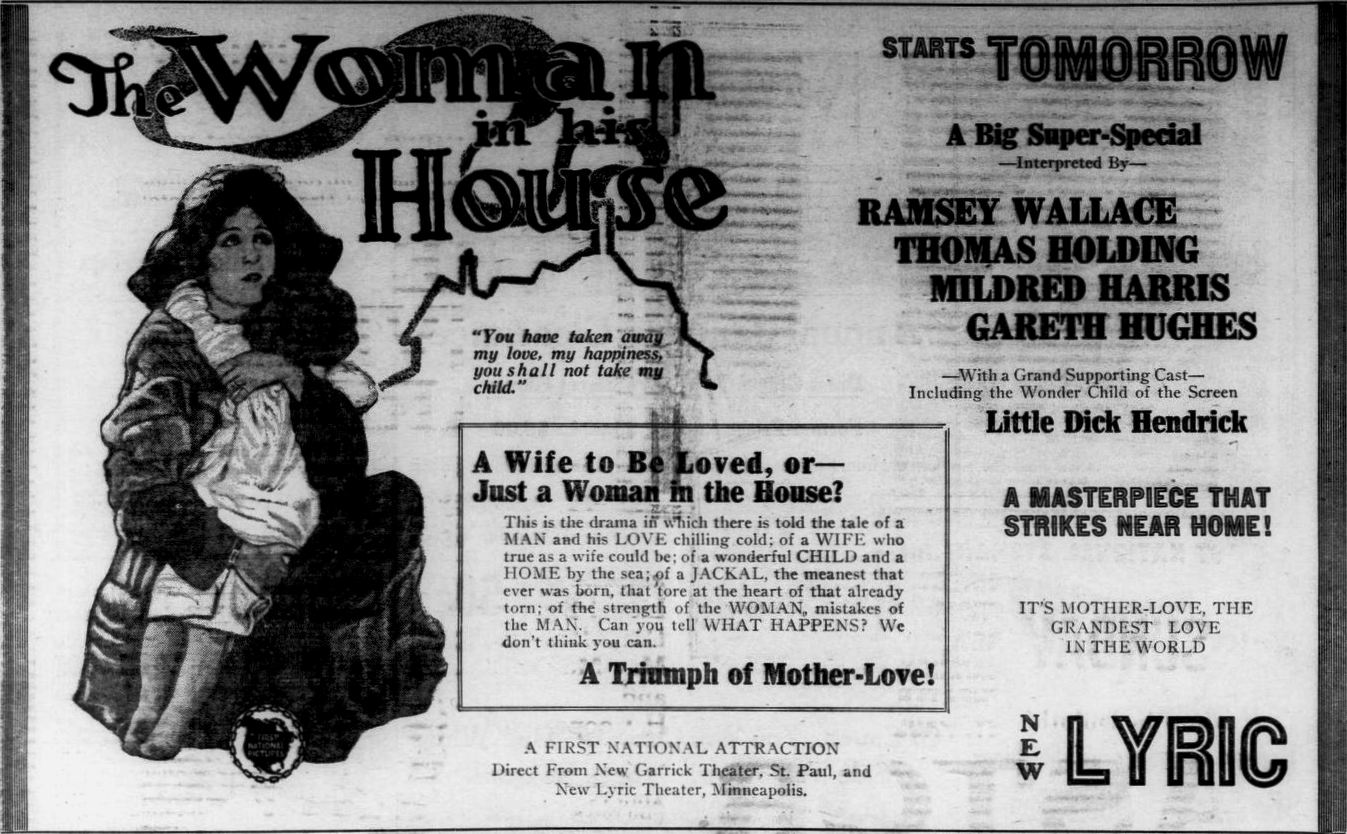
- Newspaper ad
- Directed by: John M. Stahl
- Written by: Frances Irene Reels (story); Madge Tyrone (scenario)
- Produced by: Louis B. Mayer
- Starring: Mildred Harris
- Cinematography: Pliny Goodfriend
- Production company: Chaplin-Mayer Pictures Company
- Distributed by: First National Exhibitors
- Release date: August 1920
- Running time: 6 reels
- Country: United States
- Language: Silent (English intertitles)

The Woman in His House is a 1920 American silent drama film produced by Louis B. Mayer, directed by John M. Stahl, and starring Mildred Harris.

It is a lost film with no archive holdings.

== Plot ==
As described in a film magazine, with the coming of their little son, Dr. Philip Emerson and his wife Hilda drift slowly apart. The doctor spends most of his time at his work and permits his friend Peter Marvin and Robert Livingston, a lounge lizard, to occupy his wife's time. When Peter sees the trend of feeling between Hilda and Robert, he seeks to bring about a better understanding between the husband and wife. However, an epidemic of infantile paralysis absorbs the physician's time and he neglects his wife. When their own son is stricken, Hilda. believing her son has died, leaves his bedside. He is revived, and the father devotes every minute of his time for several weeks attempting to find a cure, but the child is hopelessly crippled. Peter finally brings about a meeting between Hilda and the child, and what science could not accomplish is done by love.

== Cast ==
- Mildred Harris as Hilda (credited as Mildred Harris Chaplin)
- Ramsey Wallace as Dr. Philip Emerson
- Thomas Holding as Peter Marvin
- George Fisher as Robert Livingston
- Gareth Hughes as Sigurd
- Richard Headrick as Philip Emerson Jr.
- Winter Hall as Hilda's Father, Andrew Martin
- Katherine Van Buren as Emerson's Assistant (credited as Catherine Van Buren)
- Robert Walker as Associate Doctor (credited as Bob Walker)
