= Florence Reed =

American actress (1883-1967)

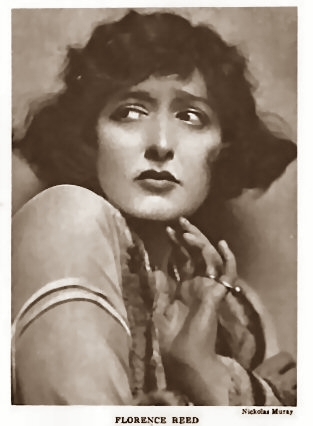
- Theatre Magazine, 1921
- Born: January 10, 1883; Philadelphia, Pennsylvania, U.S.
- Died: November 21, 1967 (aged 84); East Islip, New York, U.S.
- Occupation: Actress
- Years active: 1904-1960
- Known for: Great Expectations; The Yellow Ticket
- Spouse: Malcolm Williams (1908–1937; his death)
- Parent: Isadore Rush (stepmother)
- Awards: American Theater Hall of Fame

Florence Reed (January 10, 1883 – November 21, 1967) was an American stage and film actress. She is remembered for several outstanding stage productions, including The Shanghai Gesture, The Lullaby, The Yellow Ticket and The Wanderer. Her best remembered movie role was as Miss Havisham in the 1934 production of Great Expectations. In this version, however, Miss Havisham was changed from a completely insane woman to an eccentric, who did not wear her wedding veil constantly, and who dies peacefully rather than as a result of suffering burns in a fire. In the 1950s, Reed performed in several early television shows, such as The Philco Television Playhouse, Kraft Television Theatre and The United States Steel Hour. She is a member of the American Theater Hall of Fame.

== Early life and career ==
Reed was born in Philadelphia, Pennsylvania, to comedy actor Roland Lewis Reed and his wife, Johanna (née Sommer) Reed. Her grandfather was John "Pop" Reed, a longtime stagehand of the old Walnut Street Theatre, who donated his skull to be performed in future theatrical versions of Hamlet.

Her father died in 1901 when Florence was 17 years old. Afterward she and her mother came to New York City to seek a career in the theater. She made her first appearance on the stage at Proctor's Fifth Avenue Theatre in New York in 1904 where she gave a monologue by George M. Cohan. She stayed with the Fifth Avenue Theater for years honing her craft. She also trouped the country with May Irwin in The Widow Jones and played Ophelia to E. H. Sothern's Hamlet. Reed appeared with John Barrymore in The Yellow Ticket (1914) which proved a popular play of the season. In 1943 she created the role of The Fortune Teller in The Skin of Our Teeth by Thornton Wilder, reprising it in a 1955 Broadway revival.

== Movies ==
Reed started making movies in the silent era around 1915. She was a stage star by then and her first movie was The Dancing Girl for Adolph Zukor's Famous Players studio built around her talents. She also made films for several different production companies such as Popular Plays & Players, Astra, Arrow, Tribune, and Pathé. In all, Reed made 15 silent pictures, the last being The Black Panther's Cub (1921). After 13 years she made her first talking film in Great Expectations (1934). She made two more films but preferred the theater.

== Personal life ==
Reed was married to actor Malcolm Williams from February 1908 until his death in 1937. They often appeared in stage productions together. They had no children. She died on November 21, 1967.

She was interred in the same burial plot with her good friend, actress Blanche Yurka, in the Actors Fund of America section of Kensico Cemetery, Valhalla, New York.

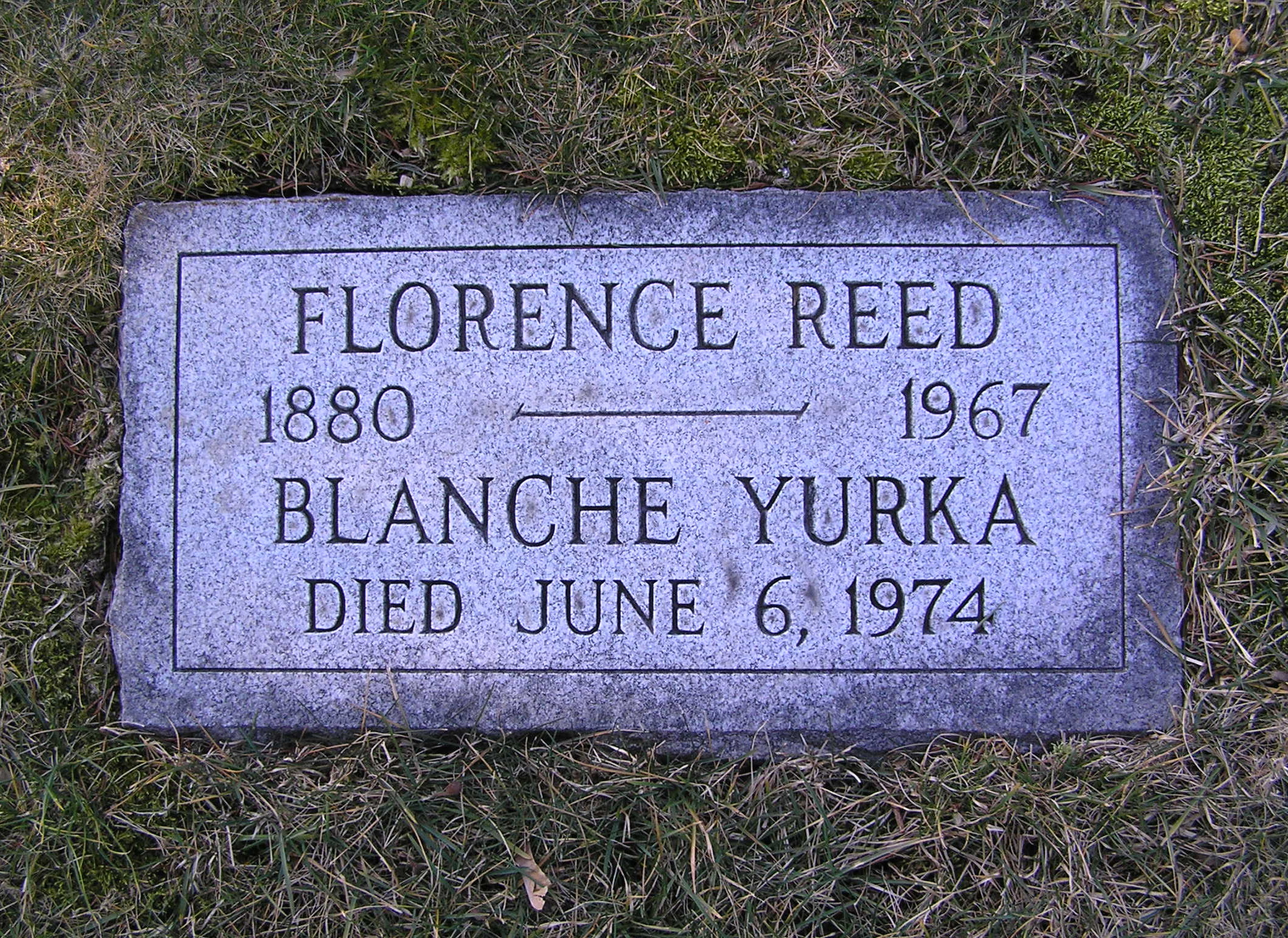
Florence Reed and Blanche Yurka burial plot, with apparently wrong year of birth for Reed, and missing birth info altogether for Yurka

== Filmography ==
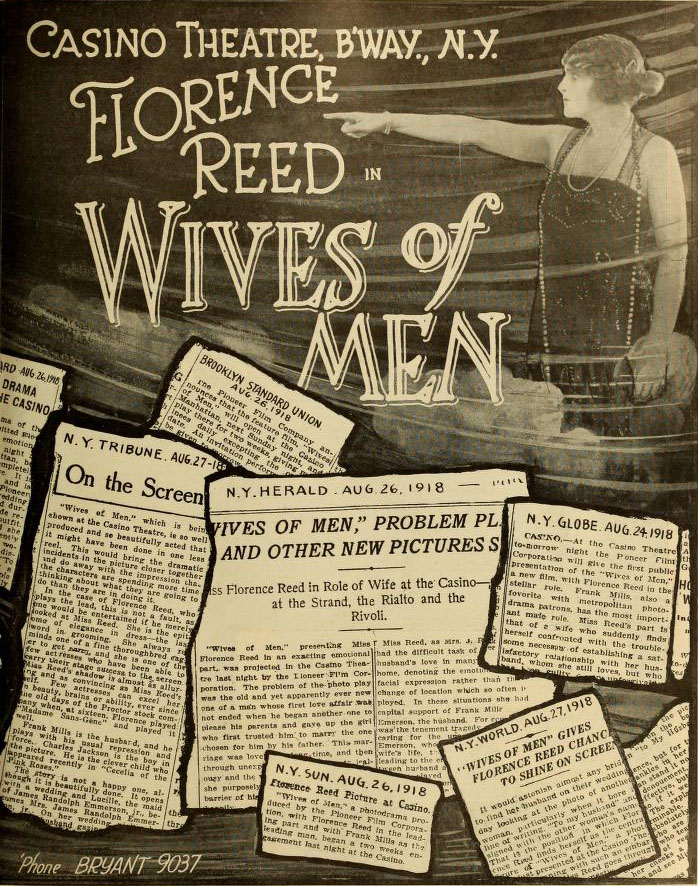
Wives of Men (1918)

Silent films

- Our Mutual Girl (1914) as herself (episode 20)
- The Dancing Girl (1915) as Drusilla Ives
- Her Own Way (1915) as Georgiana Carley
- The Cowardly Way (1915) as Eunice Fielding
- At Bay (1915) as Aline Graham
- New York (1916) as Nora Nelson, later Mrs. King
- The Woman's Law (1916) as Gail Orcutt
- The Eternal Sin (1917) as Lucretia Borgia
- To-Day (1917) as Lily Morton
- The Struggle Everlasting (1918) as Body, aka Lois
- Wives of Men (1918) as Lucille Emerson
- Her Code of Honor (1919; *BFI Natl. Film & TV archive, London) as Helen / Alice
- The Woman Under Oath (1919; *copy: BFI Natl. Film & TV archive, London) as Grace Norton
- Her Game (1919) as Carol Raymond
- The Eternal Mother (1920) as Laura West
- The Black Panther's Cub (1921) as The Black Panther / Mary Maudsley / Faustine

Sound films

- Great Expectations (1934) as Miss Havisham
- Frankie and Johnny (1936) as Lou
- Stage Door (1937) (uncredited)
