= John M. Stahl =

Russian-born American film director and producer (1886–1950)

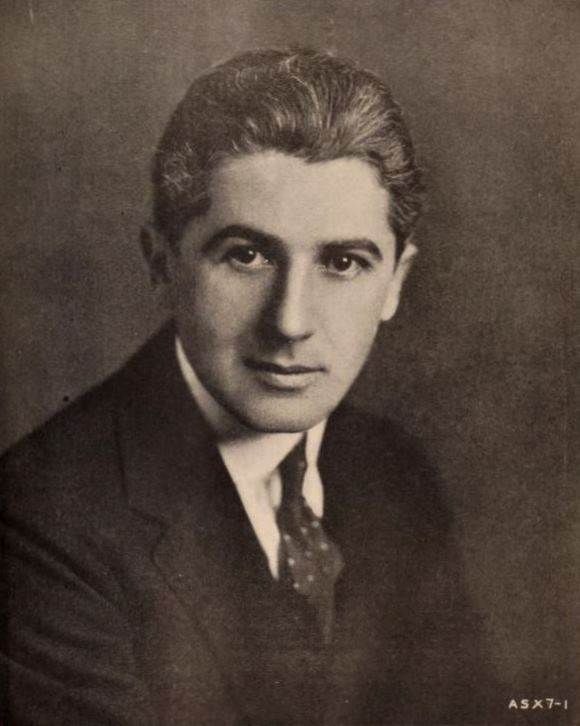
- circa 1920
- Born: Jacob Morris Strelitsky; January 21, 1886; Baku, Caucasus Viceroyalty, Russian Empire
- Died: January 12, 1950 (aged 63); Hollywood, California, U.S.
- Other name: John Malcolm Stahl
- Occupations: Film director and producer
- Spouses: Frances Irene Reels (m. 1918; died 1926) Roxana McGowan (m. 1931)

John Malcolm Stahl (January 21, 1886 – January 12, 1950, born Jacob Morris Strelitsky) (Note: Russian: Яков Стрелицкий, romanized: Yakov Strelitsky) was a Russian-born American film director and producer. He is best known for his films such as Leave Her to Heaven (1945), Imitation of Life (1934), The Keys of the Kingdom (1944), and Back Street (1932).

== Life and work ==
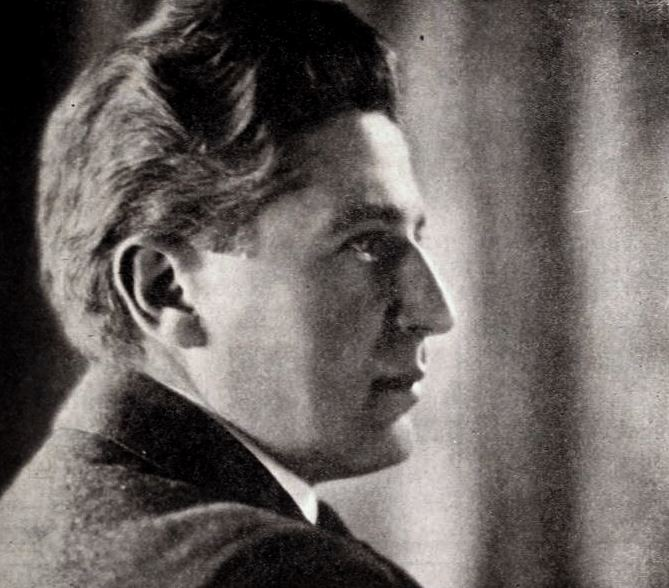
Stahl in 1922

He was born Jacob Morris Strelitsky in Baku (Azerbaijan) to a Russian Jewish family. When he was a child, his family left the Russian Empire and moved to the United States, settling in New York City. At a young age he took the name John Malcolm Stahl and began working, first as a theatre actor and then in the city's growing motion picture industry. He directed his first silent film short in 1913.

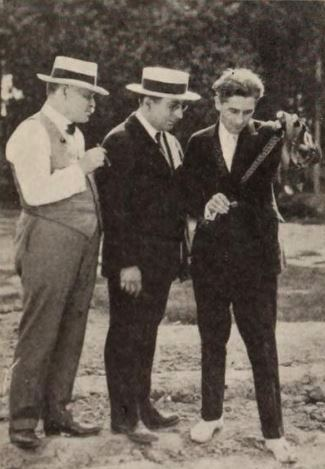
Still from the Sowing the Wind with film producers William Nicholas Selig and Louis B. Mayer and director John M. Stahl examine the film from one "take".

In 1919 he signed on with Louis B. Mayer Pictures in Hollywood. In 1924 he was part of the Mayer team that founded MGM Studios. In 1927, Stahl was one of the thirty-six founding members of the Academy of Motion Picture Arts and Sciences. When the industry transitioned to talkies and feature-length films, Stahl successfully made the adjustment. From 1927 through 1929, Stahl was an executive at the short-lived independent studio Tiffany Pictures, and renamed the company "Tiffany-Stahl Productions".

In 1930, he joined Universal Pictures where he directed several pre-code films including Back Street in 1932, starring Irene Dunne and John Boles, and the following year Only Yesterday, again with Boles, and with Margaret Sullavan in her film debut. In 1934, he directed the film Imitation of Life, starring Claudette Colbert and Louise Beavers, which was nominated for an Academy Award for Best Picture only to lose to It Happened One Night, also starring Colbert, for which she received the Academy Award for Best Actress. In 1935, he once again directed Irene Dunne, this time in Magnificent Obsession, together with Robert Taylor. Both films were later remade in the 1950s by director Douglas Sirk.

Stahl continued to produce and direct major productions as well as filler shorts up to the time of his death. Some of his other notable directorial work was for The Keys of the Kingdom (1944) and Leave Her to Heaven (1945). The former film starred Gregory Peck, while the latter starred Gene Tierney. They each received Academy Award nominations in the leading categories (Best Actor and Best Actress, respectively) at the 18th Oscars ceremony.

Stahl died in Hollywood in 1950. He is interred at Forest Lawn Memorial Park Cemetery in Glendale, California.

He was married to actress and writer Frances Irene Reels from 1918 to her death in 1926; and to actress Roxana McGowan from 1931 to his death.

On February 8, 1960, for his contributions to the motion picture industry, Stahl received a star on the Hollywood Walk of Fame at 6546 Hollywood Boulevard.

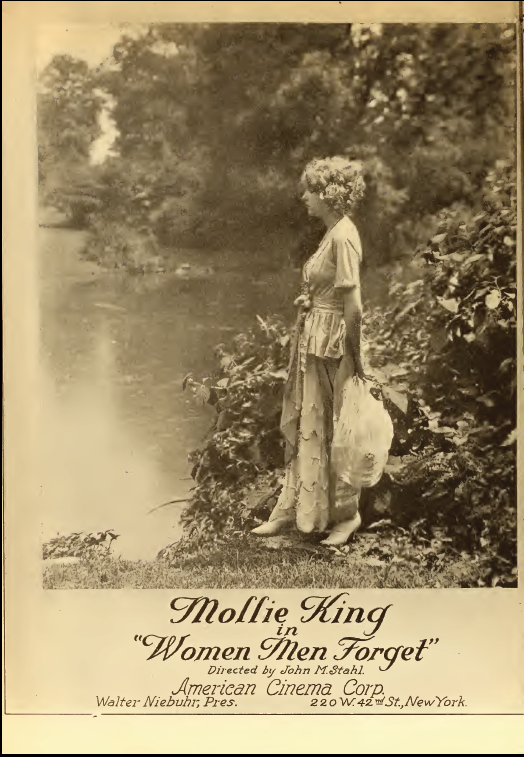
Ad with Mollie King in the film Women Men Forget (1920).

== Filmography ==
=== Director ===
- A Boy and the Law (1913) (uncredited) (Lost)
- The Lincoln Cycle (1917) (uncredited)
- Wives of Men (1918) (Lost)
- Suspicion (1918) (Lost)
- Her Code of Honor (1919)
- The Woman Under Oath (1919)
- Women Men Forget (1920) (Lost)
- The Woman in His House (1920) (Lost)
- Sowing the Wind (1921)
- The Child Thou Gavest Me (1921)
- Suspicious Wives (1921)
- One Clear Call (1922)
- The Song of Life (1922)
- The Dangerous Age (1923) (Lost)
- The Wanters (1923) (Lost - one reel survives)
- Why Men Leave Home (1924)
- Husbands and Lovers (1924)
- Fine Clothes (1925) (Lost)
- The Gay Deceiver (1926) (Lost)
- Memory Lane (1926)
- Lovers? (1927) (Lost)
- In Old Kentucky (1927)
- A Lady Surrenders (1930)
- Seed (1931)
- Strictly Dishonorable (1931)
- Back Street (1932)
- Only Yesterday (1933)
- Imitation of Life (1934)
- Magnificent Obsession (1935)
- Parnell (1937)
- Letter of Introduction (1938)
- When Tomorrow Comes (1939)
- Our Wife (1941)
- Immortal Sergeant (1943)
- Holy Matrimony (1943)
- The Eve of St. Mark (1944)
- The Keys of the Kingdom (1944)
- Leave Her to Heaven (1945)
- The Foxes of Harrow (1947)
- The Walls of Jericho (1948)
- Father Was a Fullback (1949)
- Oh, You Beautiful Doll (1949)

=== Producer ===
- The Child Thou Gavest Me (1921)
- Husbands and Lovers (1924)
- Memory Lane (1926)
- Lovers (1927)
- Wild Geese (1927)
- In Old Kentucky (1927)
- The Haunted Ship (1927)
- Streets of Shanghai (1927)
- A Woman Against the World (1928)
- The Devil's Skipper (1928)
- Nameless Men (1928)
- The Man in Hobbles (1928)
- The Tragedy of Youth (1928)
- Their Hour (1928)
- Bachelor's Paradise (1928)
- The House of Scandal (1928)
- The Scarlet Dove (1928)
- Ladies of the Night Club (1928)
- Stormy Waters (1928)
- Clothes Make the Woman (1928)
- Green Grass Widows (1928)
- Prowlers of the Sea (1928)
- Lingerie (1928)
- Beautiful But Dumb (1928)
- The Grain of Dust (1928)
- Domestic Meddlers (1928)
- The Toilers (1928)
- The Naughty Duchess (1928)
- The Power of Silence (1928)
- The Cavalier (1928)
- Marriage by Contract (1928)
- The Floating College (1928)
- The Gun Runner (1928)
- Tropical Nights (1928)
- George Washington Cohen (1928)
- Broadway Fever (1929)
- The Rainbow (1929)
- Lucky Boy (1929)
- The Spirit of Youth (1929)
- The Devil's Apple Tree (1929)
- Molly and Me (1929)
- My Lady's Past (1929)
- The Lost Zeppelin (1929)
- New Orleans (1929)
- Two Men and a Maid (1929)
- Midstream (1929)
- Whispering Winds (1929)
- Mister Antonio (1929)
- Painted Faces (1929)
- Seed (1931)
- Strictly Dishonorable (1931)
- Magnificent Obsession (1935)
- Parnell (1937)
- Letter of Introduction (1938)
- When Tomorrow Comes (1939)
- Our Wife (1941)
