= The Gay Deceiver =

1926 film directed by John M. Stahl

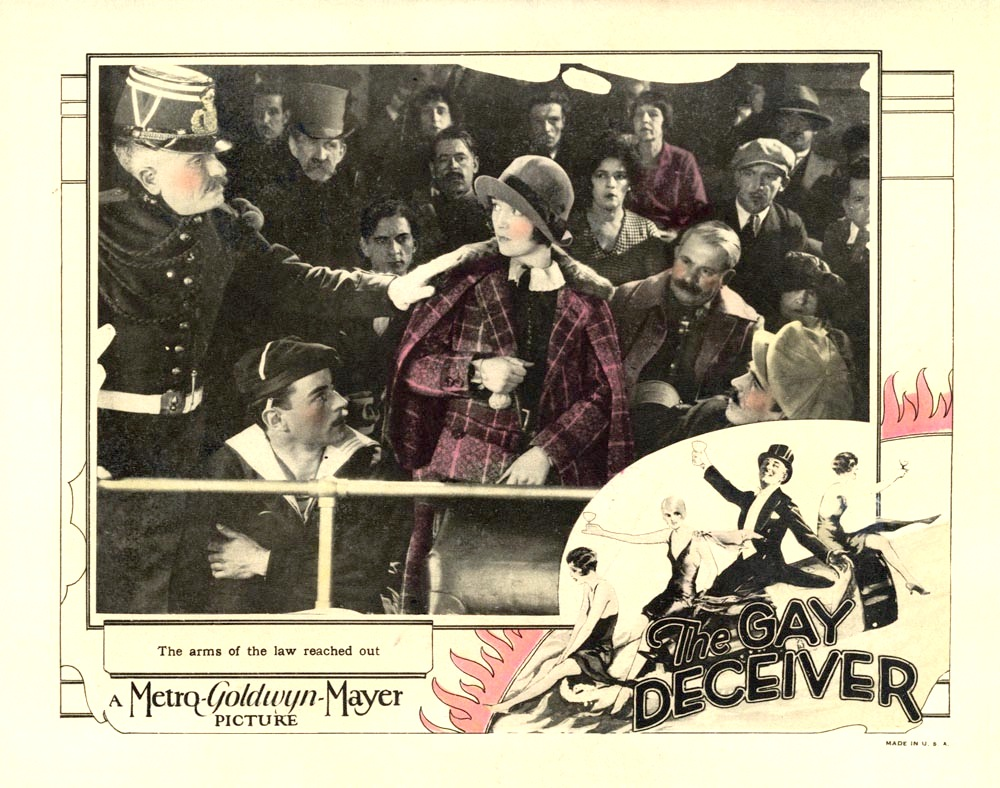
- Lobby card for the film
- Directed by: John M. Stahl
- Written by: Benjamin Glazer
- Based on: Toto by Achmed Abdullah Maurice Hennequin (play Patachon); Félix Duquesnel (play Patachon)
- Starring: Lew Cody; Carmel Myers
- Cinematography: Max Fabian; Tony Gaudio
- Distributed by: Metro-Goldwyn-Mayer
- Release date: September 19, 1926
- Running time: 70 minutes
- Country: United States
- Language: Silent (English intertitles)

The Gay Deceiver is a 1926 American silent romantic drama film directed by John M. Stahl. The film stars Lew Cody and Carmel Myers.

== Plot ==
As described in a film magazine review, Paris stage idol Toto is involved in love affairs and plays around with hearts, and is surprised by the arrival of Louise, an 18 year old young woman who says that she is his daughter, the offspring from his marriage to Claire, a woman he soon deserted. The daughter becomes infatuated with one of her father's friends, Robert Le Rivarol, and soon becomes engaged. Her mother Claire arrives to take her back home and the two are separated. Antoine pretends a reconciliation with his wife in order to obtain her consent to her daughter's marriage. However, Claire learns of the ruse and orders him from her home. Meanwhile, his current lady love learns that he has a grown daughter and quits him, saying that he is too old for her. Toto returns to his wife and promises to be true. Her love for him is big enough to take him back, and his daughter is happy in her marriage with Robert.

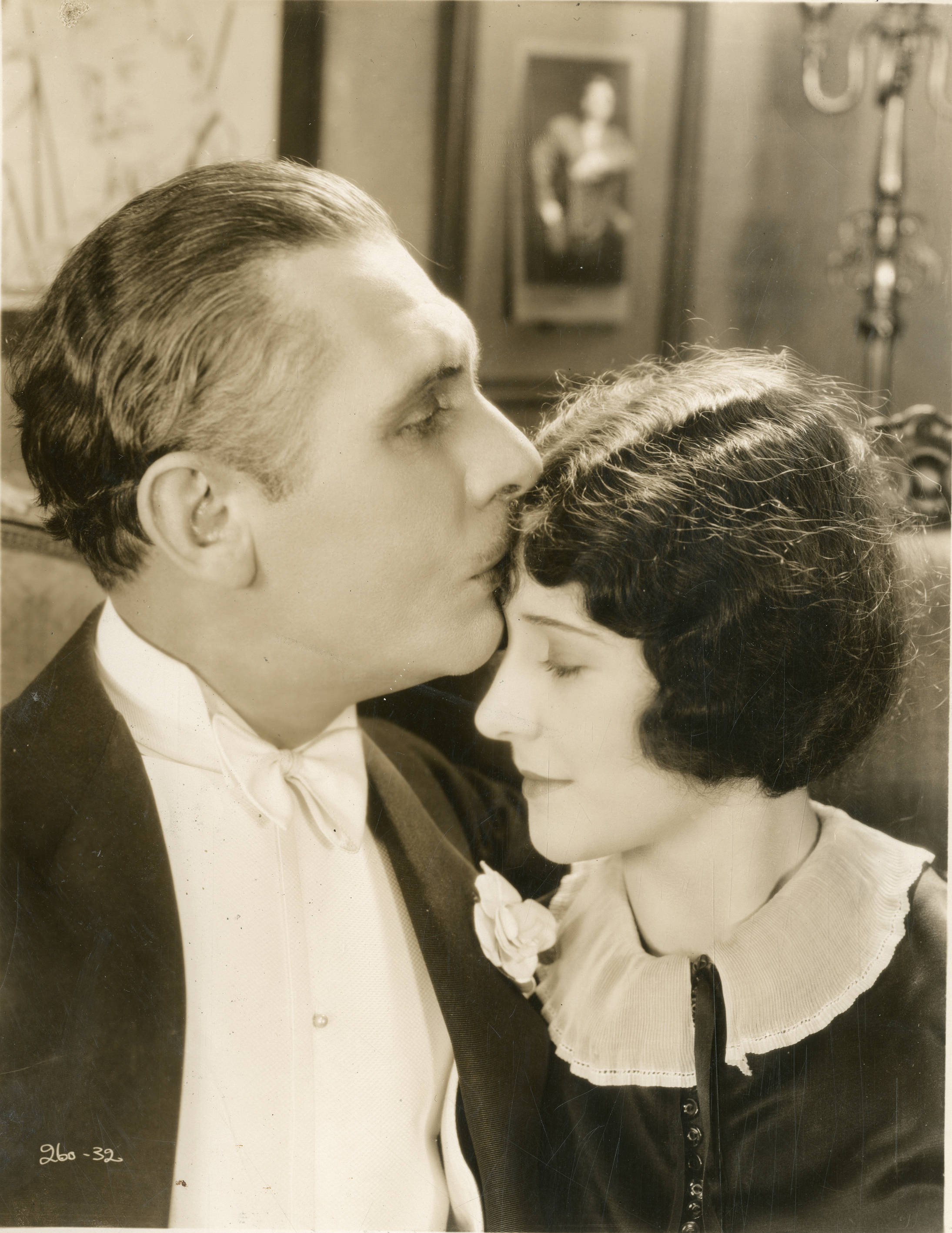
Lew Cody and Marceline Day

== Cast ==
- Lew Cody as Toto / Antoine di Tillois
- Malcolm McGregor as Robert Le Rivarol
- Marceline Day as Louise de Tillois
- Carmel Myers as Countess de Sano
- Roy D'Arcy as Count de Sano
- Dorothy Phillips as Claire
- Edward Connelly as Merinville, the lawyer
- Tony D'Algy as Merinville's nephew

== Preservation ==
With no prints of The Gay Deceiver located in any film archives, it is a lost film. Only stills and promotional material remain.
