= Louis B. Mayer Pictures =

American film production company

- Founded: 1918; 108 years ago
- Founder: Louis B. Mayer
- Defunct: April 17, 1924; 102 years ago
- Fate: Merged with Metro Pictures Corporation and Goldwyn Pictures to form Metro-Goldwyn-Mayer
- Successors: Studio: Metro-Goldwyn-Mayer; Amazon MGM Studios; Library: Public domain

Louis B. Mayer Pictures (or Louis B. Mayer Productions) was an American film production company of the silent era which operated from 1918 until 1924.

== History ==
Founded by the New England–based theater owner Louis B. Mayer, it functioned as a high-class producer of films for the first-run market. One of the leading Mayer stars was Anita Stewart who was recruited from Vitagraph Studios. The company had a long-running distribution arrangement with First National Pictures. Mayer appointed Irving Thalberg as head of production following his stint at Universal Pictures.

In 1924, the company was part of a series of mergers by Marcus Loew that brought together Metro Pictures and Goldwyn Pictures into a single outfit MGM, which was a central major studio of the classical era. Although the new company was initially known as Metro-Goldwyn, within a year the name Mayer had been added to the title in acknowledgement of his key role in the studio.

== Bibliography ==
- Eyman, Scott. Lion of Hollywood: The Life and Legend of Louis B. Mayer. Simon and Schuster, 2008.
- Schatz, Thomas. The Genius of the System: Hollywood Filmmaking in the Studio Era. Henry Holt and Company, 2015.
