= Elizabeth Crocker Bowers =

American actress

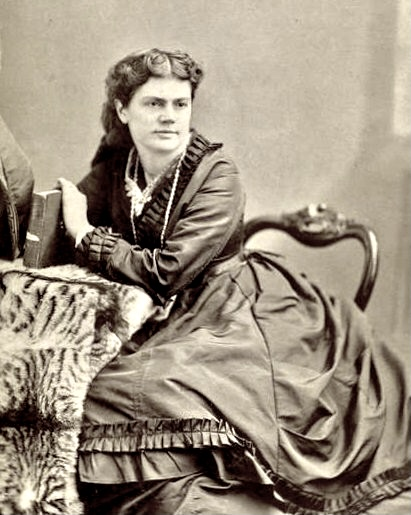
- Born: March 12, 1830; Stamford, Connecticut, U.S.
- Died: November 6, 1895 (aged 65); Philadelphia, Pennsylvania, U.S.
- Resting place: Rock Creek Cemetery; Washington, D.C., U.S.
- Occupation: Actress
- Years active: 1846–1895
- Spouse(s): David P. Bowers (m. 1847; died 1857) Dr. Brown (circa 1860–1867, his death); J. C. McCollom
- Relatives: Sarah Crocker Conway (sister), Conway Tearle (great nephew), Godfrey Tearle (great nephew)

Elizabeth Crocker Bowers (March 12, 1830 – November 6, 1895) was an American stage actress and theatrical manager. She was also known professionally as Mrs. D. P. Bowers.

== Early life ==
Elizabeth Crocker Bowers was born March 12, 1830, in Stamford, Connecticut, the daughter of an Episcopal clergyman and sister of actress Sarah Crocker Conway (also known as Mrs. F. B. Conway).

== Career and marriages ==
In 1846, she appeared in the character of "Amanthis" at the Park Theatre in New York City, New York.

On March 4, 1847, she married actor David P. Bowers, and moved to Philadelphia. She appeared as Donna Victoria in A Bold Stroke for a Husband at the Walnut Street Theatre in Philadelphia. She became very popular at the Arch Street Theatre, and made Philadelphia her home until her husband's death in 1857.

In December 1857, after a period of retirement from the stage, she leased the Walnut Street Theatre and retained its management until 1859. She then leased the Philadelphia Academy of Music for a short dramatic season.

She married Dr. Brown of Baltimore in 1861. and traveled to London. She made a great success as "Julia" in The Hunchback at the Sadler's Wells Theatre and "Geraldine D'Arcy" in Woman at the Lyceum Theatre in London. Returning to New York City in 1863, she played for a time at the Winter Garden (now demolished). Among her favorite roles were Juliet, Lady Macbeth, and Marie Antoinette.

After the death of Dr. Brown in 1867, she toured extensively with James "J.C." McCollum whom she later married. With McCollom, she repeated many of her popular roles. Mrs. Bowers first toured the West in 1868 playing for over two months in Thomas Maguire's San Francisco theaters, then spending 20 days in Virginia City, Nv at Piper's Opera House. Returning in 1875, Mrs. Bowers followed Katherine Rogers at the California Theatre with the first presentation in America of Rose Michel; Bowers “more triumphant” every time she “comes to California.” She was the last legitimate player at the California Theatre before its demise in 1888.

Her subsequent retirement in Philadelphia was interrupted by a return to the stage in October 1886 for several years. She organized a new dramatic company, and visited the principal cities of the U.S., playing many of her old and favorite characters. Under A. M. Palmer's management she appeared in Lady Windermere's Fan (1893), and later she was a supporting actress for Rose Coghlan and Olga Nethersole.

Bowers died of pneumonia and heart failure on November 6, 1895 in at the home of her son-in-law, Frank Bennett, in Washington D.C. She was survived by a daughter, Mrs. F. V.(May) Bennett and two sons, Harry C. Bowers of Portland, OR and Walter Bowers of New York City. She was buried at Rock Creek Cemetery in Washington, D.C.
