= John Moore (stage manager) =

John Moore (1814–1893) was a British actor, prompter, and stage manager.

== Early life ==
John Moore was born in London on 3 April 1814.

Moore first appeared on the stage at a very young age, playing an infant in a production of "Rolla." He returned as a teenager, playing a page in Thomas Mayhew's play "Ambition, or, Marie Mignot" at the Haymarket Theatre in 1830. In September 1848, he made his first appearance on the American theater scene, playing Flitterman in James Planché's "Somebody Else" at the Park Theatre.

== Career as a stage manager ==
The majority of Moore's career was spent as a stage manager and prompter at various theaters in New York, and was described in his obituary as "the most noted in his calling of any in the country." By 1852, Moore had become a prompter at the Bowery Theatre. In the late 1850s, he was the stage manager at Burton's Theatre. In the early 1860s, he returned to the Park Theatre, then under the management of Frederick and Sarah Conway, as stage manager. Several years later, he joined the staff of Wallack's Theatre.

Around 1870 (or possibly 1874, according to his obituary), he became the stage manager at Augustin Daly's theatre, where he stayed for twenty-three years. He occasionally took on small acting roles, such as Vincentio in Daly's 1886 revival of The Taming of the Shrew, Shallow in The Merry Wives of Windsor the same year, and a groom in Daly's 1875 production of Richard II featuring Edwin Booth in the title role.

== Death and legacy ==
Moore died in New York City on 11 January 1893 after several years of ill health. He was survived by a son and daughter.

Moore was described as "one of the most genial and companionable men who ever lived." He was an avid book collector and owned a large theatrical library, which he left to Daly. Portions of Moore's collection, including many of his detailed promptbooks, later ended up in the Harvard Library system and the Folger Shakespeare Library.
