= Love's Masquerade =

Love's Masquerade may refer to:

- Love's Masquerade (1928 film), a German silent film
- Love's Masquerade (1922 film), an American silent drama film
