= Lummox (film) =

1930 film by Herbert Brenon

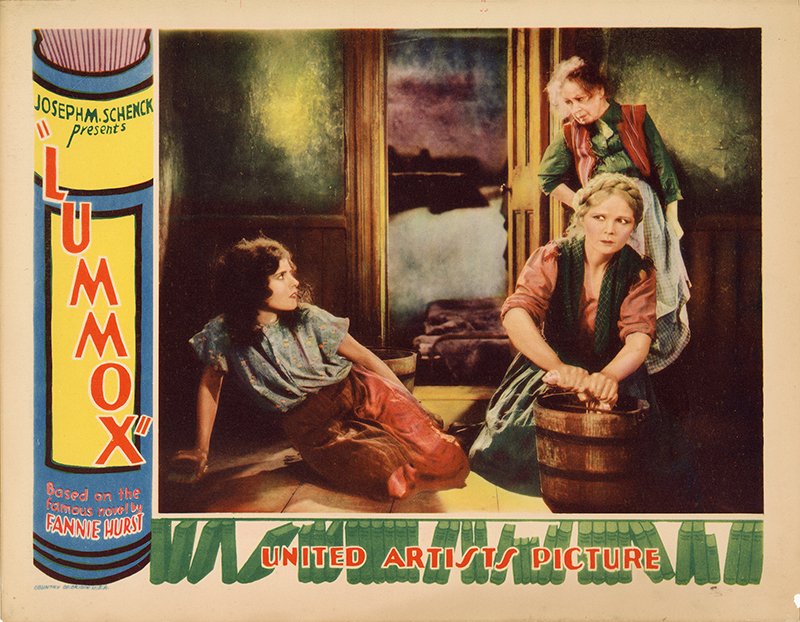
- Film lobby card
- Directed by: Herbert Brenon; Ray Lissner (assistant)
- Written by: Fannie Hurst (novel, dialogue); Elizabeth Meehan (adaptation)
- Produced by: Joseph M. Schenck
- Starring: Winifred Westover
- Cinematography: Karl Struss
- Edited by: Marie Halvey
- Music by: Jack Danielson; Hugo Riesenfeld
- Production company: Feature Productions
- Distributed by: United Artists
- Release dates: January 13, 1930 (Germany); January 18, 1930 (United States)
- Running time: 88 minutes
- Country: United States
- Language: English intertitles

Lummox is a 1930 American pre-Code sound drama film directed by Herbert Brenon and starring Winifred Westover, based on Fannie Hurst’s 1923 novel of the same name. It was released through United Artists in Germany on 13 January, and in America on 18 January, 1930.

== Plot ==
Bertha Oberg, an uneducated Swedish servant, is known by the derogatory nickname Lummox, which means a slow or stupid person, and is criticized by most people she meets. However, Rollo Farley, her employers' son, feels inspired by Bertha and writes poetry about her, with lines that include "A tower of silence under the sea."

Rollo seduces Bertha, and when she later discovers she is pregnant, she leaves her employment without telling anyone of her condition. Her child is given to a wealthy family, and she sometimes learns about him from one of the family's servants. She is told the boy plays the piano, and that his parents are sending him to Europe to study music. He was inspired to be a musician because of a concertina Bertha anonymously sent to her son.

Bertha learns her son will be playing at Carnegie Hall. She buys a standing-room ticket and is able to see and hear her handsome son play the piano. At the end of the film, Bertha is too old to work as a servant anymore. She goes into a bakery run by a kind widower, who asks her to live in his home and care for his motherless children.

== Cast ==
- Winifred Westover as Betha
- Dorothy Janis as Chita (credited as Dorothy King)
- Lydia Yeamans Titus as Annie Wennerberg
- Ida Darling as Mrs. Farley
- Ben Lyon as Rollo Farley
- Myrta Bonillas as Veronica Neidringhous
- Cosmo Kyrle Bellew as John Bixby
- Anita Bellew as Mrs. John Bixby
- Robert Ullman as Paul Bixby
- Clara Langsner as Mrs. Wallenstein Sr.
- William Collier Jr. as Wally Wallenstein
- Edna Murphy as May Wallenstein
- Torben Meyer as Silly Willie
- Fannie Bourke as Mrs. McMurtry
- Myrtle Stedman as Mrs. Ossetrich
- Danny O'Shea as Barney
- William Bakewell as Paul Charvet
- Sidney Franklin as Mr. Meyerbogen
- Dickie Moore in a bit part
- Billy Seay as Petey

== Production ==
Lummox marked Westover’s return to acting after a several year hiatus; the terms of an agreement signed during proceedings of her divorce from William S. Hart in 1922 explicitly prevented her from working in motion pictures in any capacity or associating herself with Hart’s name. However, Westover petitioned the court for the right to act under her maiden name, and she was allowed to return to work. Having read Hurst’s novel and wanting to be involved in the film adaptation, she contacted both Hurst and the film’s director, Herbert Brenon, and was chosen for the lead role of Bertha Oberg.

In order to portray the heavyset servant, Westover ate fatty food, avoided exercise, and gained forty pounds. To help her appear to be a person who worked long hours of wearying labor the director gave her shoes soled with fifteen pounds of lead, and had her wear a dress with five pounds of lead weights in the collar, five pounds of lead in each of the sleeve cuffs, and ten pounds of weights in the hem of her skirt.

Sound engineer Ed Bernds did not have fond memories of Brenon: "So many of the silent film directors were phonies. I didn't think highly of Herbert Brenon, for instance. He was the old, imperious type of director. Lordly, demanding. There was a scene in Lummox, where Winifred Westover was supposed to be betrayed by Ben Lyon, who has gotten her pregnant. He throws some money down and she takes the money and tears it up with her teeth. Well, Brenon demanded real money! And several takes. The poor propman was going around borrowing money from the crew. It was the Imperial syndrome of silent film directors."

== Reception ==
Westover received praise for her acting, with one newspaper stating: "Winifred Westover’s characterization of the buxom servant girl, whose little world has been the drab atmosphere of cheap lodging houses, shabby humanity and cruel employers, reaches heights rarely ever attained." It has at times been incorrectly reported that she was nominated for an Academy Award for Best Actress for her performance in the film. Academy Awards databases make no mention of such a nomination however.

== Preservation ==
A copy of Lummox survives at the British Film Institute, and archival copies of the soundtrack are preserved at the UCLA Film & Television Archive on five discs. The film had a Movietone soundtrack, however, discs were prepared for theaters not yet wired for sound-on-film.
