= Frederick B. Conway =

American actor

- Born: February 10, 1819
- Died: September 6, 1874
- Occupation: Actor

Frederick Bartlett Conway (February 10, 1819 Clifton, England – September 6, 1874 Manchester, Massachusetts) was an actor.

He was the son of William A. Conway. He early developed a taste for the stage. After he had won a fair position in his profession in England, he came to the United States in August 1850. Here he formed an association with Edwin Forrest, and played Iago to his Othello, de Mauprat to his Richelieu, and other companion parts.

After the death of his first wife, Mr. Conway married, in May 1852, Sarah Crocker, a leading actress, and the two thenceforward acted together. In 1859, they opened Pike's Opera House in Cincinnati, Ohio with a first-class company, but the engagement was not profitable, and they returned to the east. In 1861, they visited England, and filled a short engagement at Sadler's Wells Theatre, London. After their return they became star actors, and made an extensive and profitable tour. Though somewhat pompous in manner, Frederick Conway was a good actor, with a fine personal appearance and a commanding delivery.

He was the father of Marianne "Minnie" Conway and Lilian Conway. His grandsons, Minnie's sons, were actors Conway Tearle and Godfrey Tearle.
