= Love (1919 American film) =

1919 film

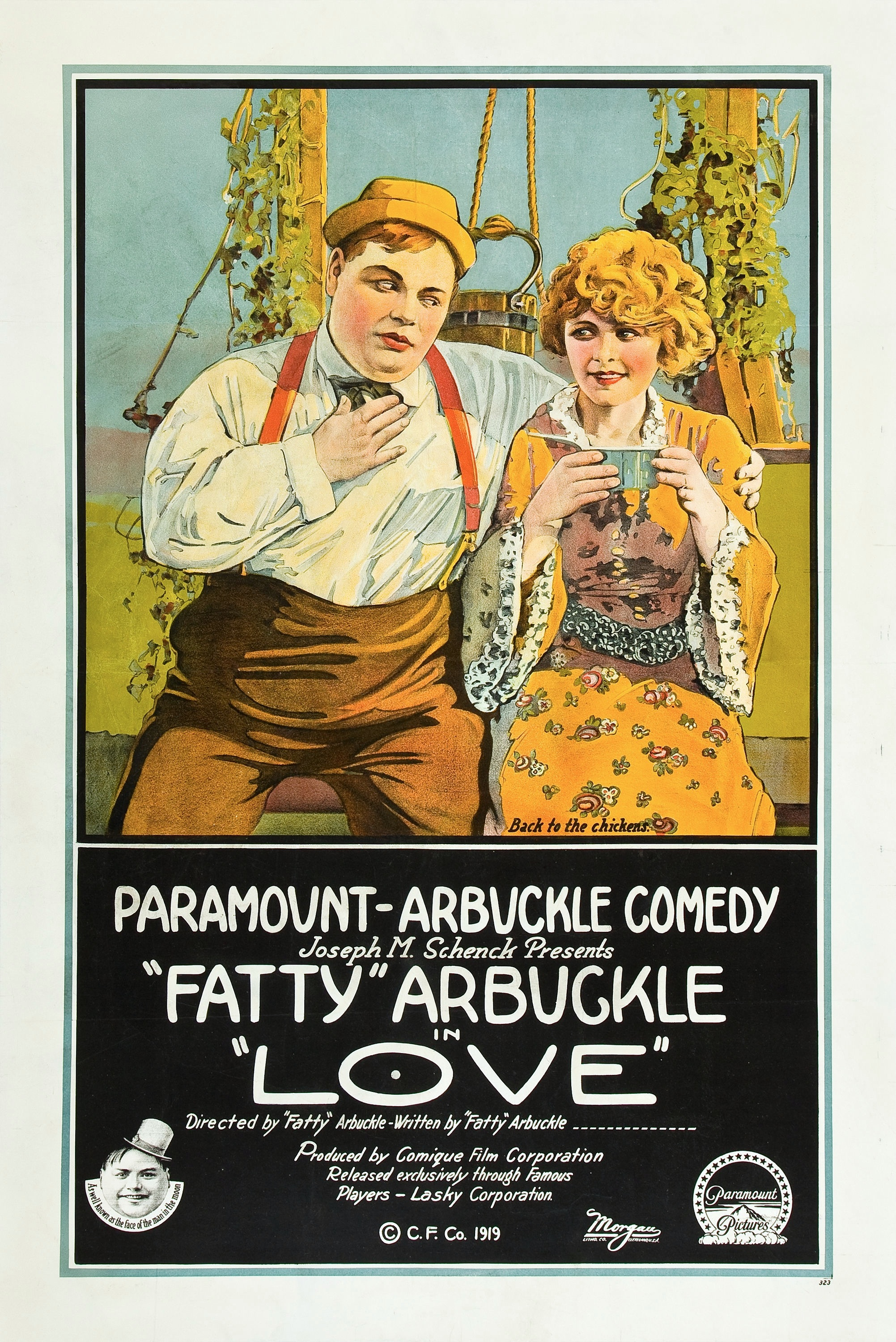
- Theatrical poster for Love (1919)
- Directed by: Roscoe "Fatty" Arbuckle
- Written by: Roscoe "Fatty" Arbuckle; Vincent Bryan
- Produced by: Joseph M. Schenck
- Starring: Roscoe "Fatty" Arbuckle
- Production company: Comique Film Company
- Distributed by: Paramount Pictures
- Release date: March 2, 1919
- Running time: 23 minutes
- Country: United States
- Language: Silent (English intertitles)

Love is a 1919 American short comedy film directed by and starring Fatty Arbuckle. Prints of the film survive in collections.

== Plot ==
As summarized in a magazine, Fatty meets Winnie after rescuing her father Frank from a well at their farm and is smitten with her. Fatty is dismissed and leaves, however, as Frank wants Winnie to marry Al Clove. Fatty returns to the farm in the disguise of a hired girl so that he can be near his beloved, but finds he must fend off the flirtations of her father Frank. Winnie's marriage is all arranged, but at the dress rehearsal the groom is missing, so the "hired girl" takes his place and goes through the practice ceremony, word for word, with the bride. When the wedding day arrives, the ceremony is broken up when Fatty and Winnie announce that they have already been married as the rehearsal was the real thing.

== Cast ==
- Roscoe "Fatty" Arbuckle as Fatty
- Al St. John as Al Clove, Fatty's rival
- Winifred Westover as Winnie
- Frank Hayes as Frank, Winnie's father
- Monty Banks as Farmhand (as Mario Bianchi)
- Kate Price as the Cook
