= Dick Rush =

American actor

- Born: Richard T. Rush; Aug 16, 1882; Australia
- Died: Mar 11, 1956 (aged 73); Los Angeles, California
- Occupation: Actor
- Years active: 1920–1948

Richard T. Rush (August 16, 1882 – March 11, 1956) was an Australian-born American character actor of the silent and sound film eras. During his 28-year career, he would appear in between 160 and 300 films (depending on the source). The large majority of his parts were smaller roles, although he would occasionally be cast in a smaller featured role.

His first part was in the silent 1920 film, Three Gold Coins, starring Tom Mix. His final appearance would be in 1948's Devil's Cargo, part of "The Falcon" film series.

== Selected filmography ==
- 3 Gold Coins (1920)
- The Village Sleuth (1920)
- Perils of the Rail (1925)
- The Benson Murder Case (1930)
- What Price Hollywood? (1932)
- Forbidden Trail (1932)
- Alimony Madness (1933)
- The Last Round-Up (1934)
- Men of the Night (1934)
- Beyond the Law (1934)
- The Whole Town's Talking (1935)
- Trails End (1935)
- After the Thin Man (1936)
- Million Dollar Haul (1935)
