= Osmond Tearle =

English actor (1852–1901)

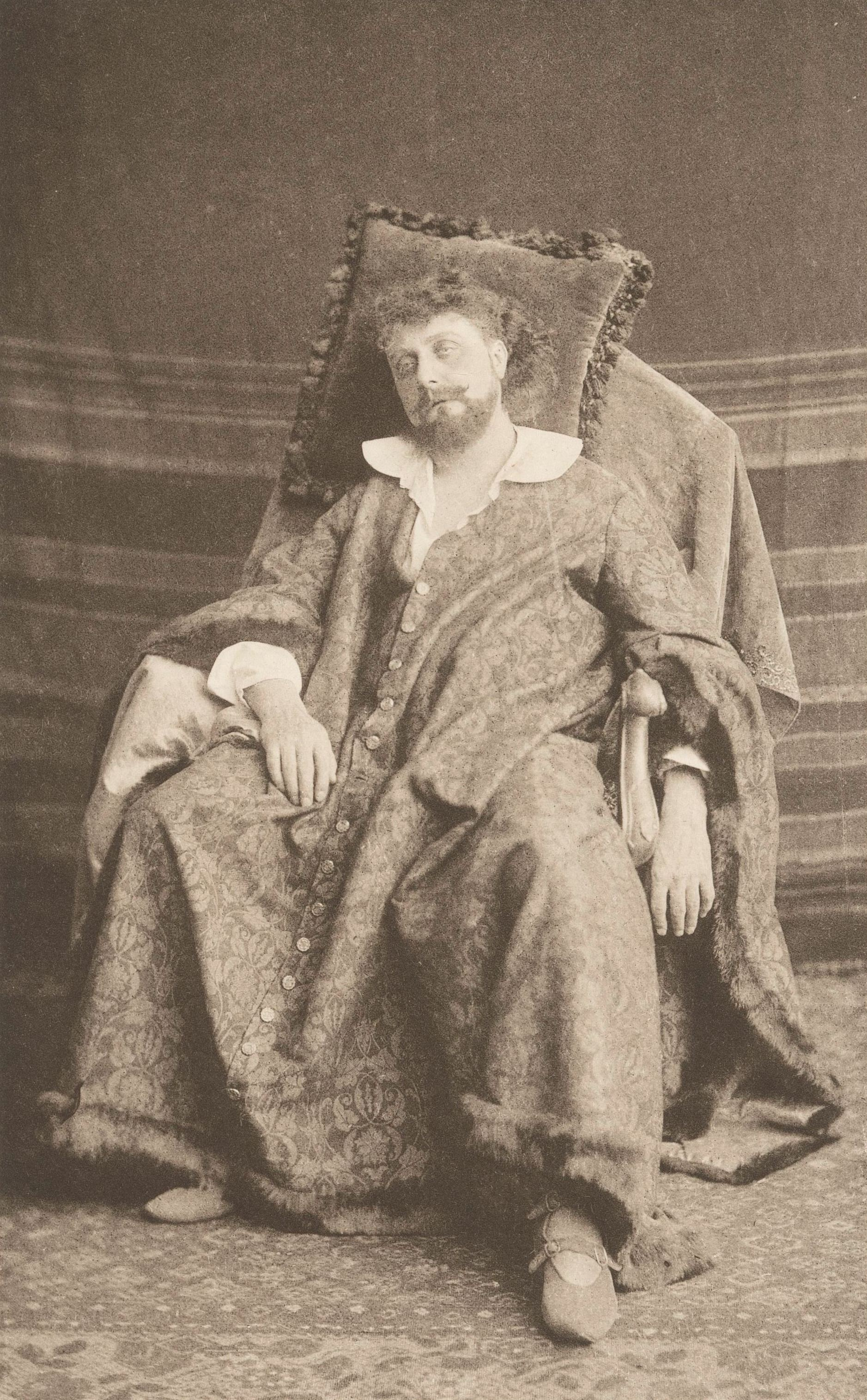
Tearle as Shakespeare's King John

Osmond Tearle (full name George Osmond Tearle: 8 March 1852 – 7 September 1901) was an English actor. He set up a touring company that performed in the provinces of England; he also appeared in America. He was known for Shakespearean roles, particularly Hamlet.

== Life ==
=== Early life and career ===
Tearle was born in Plymouth on 8 March 1852, son of George Tearle, a colour sergeant in the Royal Marines, and his wife Susan Lavers Treneman. After serving in the Crimean and China wars his father retired on pension to Liverpool. Educated there at St Francis Xavier's College, Tearle took part in amateur theatricals, and in 1868 in penny readings with Hall Caine. Inspired by Barry Sullivan's acting, he took to the stage, making his debut at the Adelphi Theatre, Liverpool, in March 1869, as Guildenstern to Adelaide Ross's Hamlet. In 1870, on Sullivan's recommendation, he became leading man at the Theatre Royal, Aberdeen. At Warrington in 1871 he appeared for the first time as Hamlet, a character which he played in all some 800 times. Early in 1874 he was a prominent and popular member of the stock company in Belfast.

After six years appearing in the provinces he made his first appearance in London at the Gaiety Theatre in March 1875 as George de Buissy in Campbell Clarke's unsuccessful adaptation of Rose Michel, subsequently playing there Charles Courtly in London Assurance. Beginning in May of that year, he played Hamlet at the Rotunda Theatre, Liverpool, for eighteen successive nights. Afterwards he toured with Mrs. John Wood's old comedy company as Charles Surface in The School for Scandal and Young Marlow in She Stoops to Conquer.

=== In America ===
At Darlington in 1877 Tearle started with his own travelling company. In September 1880 he made his American debut at Wallack's Theatre, New York, as Jacques in As You Like It, and he remained there as leading actor of the stock company. After spending the summer of 1882 in England, he reappeared in April 1883 at the Star Theatre, New York, as Hamlet, and subsequently toured in the United States as Wilfred Denver in The Silver King.

=== Shakespearean touring company ===
In 1888 he returned to England and organised his Shakespearean touring company. In 1889, and again in 1890, he conducted the festival performances at Stratford-upon-Avon, producing in the first year Julius Caesar and Henry VI, part 1, in which he played Talbot, and in the second year King John and The Two Gentlemen of Verona. His travelling company changed its bill nightly, and had a repertory of thirteen plays. It was deemed an excellent training ground for the stage novice.

Tearle last appeared in London at Terry's Theatre in July 1898 as Charles Surface to Kate Vaughan's Lady Teazle. His last appearance on the stage was at Carlisle in August 1901, as Richelieu. He died on 7 September 1901 in Byker, Newcastle-on-Tyne, and was buried beside his second wife at Whitley Bay, Northumberland.

== Commentary ==
William John Lawrence wrote in the Dictionary of National Biography: "As a Shakespearean actor Tearle combined the incisive elocution of the old school and the naturalness of the new. A man of commanding physique and dignified presence, he was well equipped for heroic parts. In later life he subdued his declamatory vigour, and played Othello and King Lear with power and restraint. He gained no foothold in London, but in America and the English provinces he won a high reputation."

== Family ==
Tearle was twice married: firstly to Mary Alice Rowe, an actress, who divorced him; secondly in 1883 to Marianne Levy, widow and actress, daughter of F. B. Conway, a New York theatre manager, and granddaughter of the actor William Augustus Conway. His second wife died on 9 October 1896. He had a son and daughter from his first marriage, and two sons from his second marriage. His three sons, among them Godfrey Tearle, became actors.
