= A Romance of the Air =

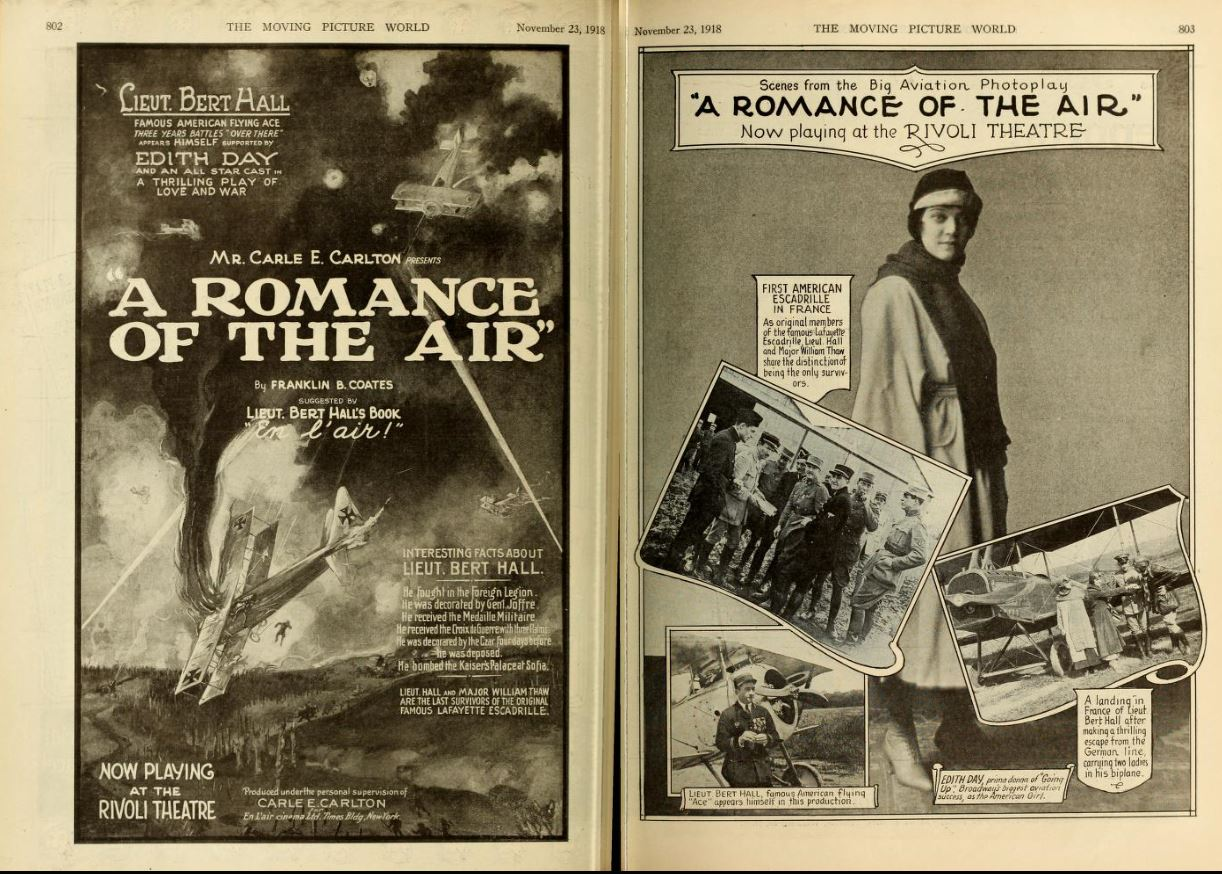
- Film Poster from Moving Picture World, November 23, 1918
- Directed by: Harry Revier
- Written by: Franklin B. Coates (scenario); Bert Hall (book)
- Based on: En L'air (1918), by Bert Hall
- Produced by: Carle E. Carleton (supervisor)
- Starring: Bert Hall; Edith Day; Florence Billings
- Cinematography: John K. Holbrook (as John Holbrook); Al Liguori (as Alfonso Liguori)
- Edited by: Franklin B. Coates
- Production companies: En l'Air Cinema, Ltd.
- Distributed by: State Rights, Crest Pictures Corp.
- Release date: November 10, 1918
- Running time: 2,100 m (7 reels)
- Country: United States
- Language: Silent (English intertitles)

A Romance of the Air is a 1918 American silent drama film based on the book En L'air (1918), by Bert Hall, one of America's first combat aviators, flying with the famed Lafayette Escadrille in France before the United States entered World War I. Directed by Harry Revier, the film was heavily influenced by the exploits of Hall, who was featured in the film and took an active role in promoting and marketing A Romance of the Air. (Note: The fanciful claims made by Bert Hall in A Romance of the Air were in dispute.)

== Plot ==
Flying with the French Lafayette Escadrille in World War I, American ace, Lieutenant Bert Hall (Bert Hall), is wounded in an aerial battle and forced to land behind enemy lines. After finding his German opponent dead, Hall exchanges uniforms with him and is taken to a German hospital to recover.

In the hospital, Hall meets Edith Day (Edith Day), an old sweetheart from Kentucky. She was unable to escape Berlin when the war broke out. The pair are accompanied by Day's best friend, the Countess of Moravia (Florence Billings), who claims sympathy with the Allied cause. The countess, however, is actually a German spy.

After stealing a German aircraft, the group escape to France. Once the true motives of the countess are revealed, Hall is accused of betraying the French government. After a trial by military tribunal, he is sentenced to be shot, but his American lover uncovers evidence that saves him at the last moment.

Exonerated, Hall dedicates himself to destroying the network of spies run by the Countess.

== Cast ==
- Bert Hall as himself (as Lieutenant Bert Hall)
- Edith Day as American girl
- Florence Billings as Countess of Moravia
- Stuart Holmes as Archduke of Moravia
- Herbert Standing as Maj. William Thaw
- Brian Darley as Gen. Montaigne
- Tom Burrough as Col. DuBois
- Joseph Lertora as Lt. Le Roy
- Franklin B. Coates as Herbert Stair
- Emma Campbell as Madame Dumont
- Emil Hoch as Gen. von Hoch
- Warner Richmond as undetermined role, possibly Herbert Stair

== Production ==
The aerial scenes in A Romance of the Air were flown by Bert Hall at the Thomas-Morse Aircraft Corporation airfield in New York. The aircraft that were used were Thomas-Morse S-4s that were painted to depict French aircraft. The production was filmed with the cooperation of the War Department. Although mainly a dramatization of the aerial battles over France, A Romance of the Air also used newsreel footage of military aircraft.

== Reception ==
Aviation film historian Michael Paris in From the Wright Brothers to Top Gun: Aviation, Nationalism, and Popular Cinema (1995), described the "grandiose launch" of A Romance of the Air, that was coupled to only a 'moderately successful" run. At the premiere and after, during the initial release of the film, Hall made personal appearances on stage, in New York theaters to promote the film.

Although Hall's appearances were unique and well-received by the audiences, film reviewer Hal Erickson, notes, "... Moving Picture World was not quite so chivalrous: 'Lieutenant Hall rings true, but his story does not'."
