= The Isle of Forgotten Women =

1927 film

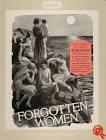
- Directed by: George B. Seitz
- Written by: Louella Parsons
- Produced by: Harry Cohn
- Starring: Conway Tearle
- Cinematography: Joseph Walker
- Distributed by: Columbia Pictures
- Release date: September 27, 1927
- Running time: 58 minutes
- Country: United States
- Language: Silent

The Isle of Forgotten Women is a 1927 American silent drama film directed by George B. Seitz. It was released as Forgotten Women in the UK.

== Cast ==
- Conway Tearle as Bruce Paine
- Dorothy Sebastian as Marua
- Gibson Gowland as John Stort
- Alice Calhoun as Alice Burroughs
- Harry Semels
- William Welsh as (as William Welch)

== Preservation and status ==
An incomplete copy of the film is held at the Archives du Film du CNC, and another copy with an unknown state of completeness is also held at La Corse et le Cinéma.
