= Beyond the Law (1934 film) =

1934 film

- Film poster
- Directed by: D. Ross Lederman
- Written by: Harold Shumate
- Starring: Tim McCoy
- Distributed by: Columbia Pictures
- Release date: July 31, 1934
- Running time: 58 minutes
- Country: United States
- Language: English

Beyond the Law is a 1934 American crime film directed by D. Ross Lederman.

== Cast ==
- Tim McCoy as Tim Weston
- Shirley Grey as Helen Glenn
- Addison Richards as Morgan
- Harry C. Bradley as Professor
- John Merton as New York Radio Policeman (as Mert La Verre)
- Dick Rush as New York Radio Policeman
- Harold Huber as Gordon
- Mischa Auer as Tully
- Clarence Wilson as Talbot
- Joseph Crehan as Chief Anderson
- Charles C. Wilson as Prosecuting Attorney (as Charles Wilson)
- Reginald Barlow as Judge
