= If Youth But Knew =

1926 British silent romance film

If Youth But Knew is a 1926 British silent romance film directed by George A. Cooper and starring Godfrey Tearle, Lillian Hall-Davis and Wyndham Standing. It is a love story spanning two generations. It was made at Southall Studios.

== Cast ==
- Godfrey Tearle - Doctor Martin Summer
- Lillian Hall-Davis - Dora / Doreen
- Wyndham Standing - Sir Ormsby Ledger
- Mary Odette - Loanda
- Mary Rorke - Mrs. Romney
- Patrick Waddington - Arthur Noel-Vane
- May Beamish - Mrs. Summer
- Minnie Rayner - Martha
- Forrester Harvey - Amos
- Donald Walcot - Aulole
- Orlando Martins
