= Florence Billings =

American actress

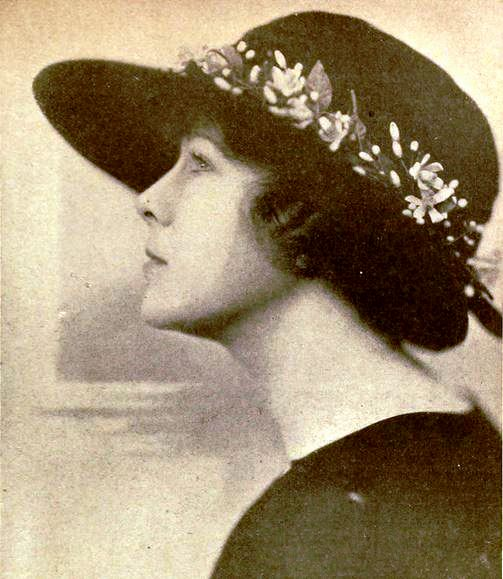
- Born: January 19, 1895; New York City, U.S.
- Died: ?
- Occupation: Actress
- Years active: 1915 – 1925 (film)

Florence Billings (born 1895) was an American film actress of the silent era.

== Selected filmography ==
- The Spreading Dawn (1917)
- By Right of Purchase (1918)
- The Fair Pretender (1918)
- Woman (1918)
- A Romance of the Air (1918)
- The Great Victory (1919)
- Her Game (1919)
- The Probation Wife (1919)
- Her Game (1919)
- The Woman Game (1920)
- The Blue Pearl (1920)
- The Road of Ambition (1920)
- The Wonder Man (1920)
- The Wakefield Case (1921)
- Handcuffs or Kisses (1921)
- Nobody (1921)
- Worlds Apart (1921)
- Why Announce Your Marriage? (1922)
- Love's Masquerade (1922)
- Who Are My Parents? (1922)
- Destiny's Isle (1922)
- What Fools Men Are (1922)
- Marriage Morals (1923)
- For Another Woman (1924)
- Sinners in Heaven (1924)
- Damaged Hearts (1924)
- Greater Than Marriage (1924)
- Miss Bluebeard (1925)
- The Heart of a Siren (1925)

== Bibliography ==
- Goble, Alan. The Complete Index to Literary Sources in Film. Walter de Gruyter, 1999.
