= Bucking the Tiger (film) =

1921 silent film

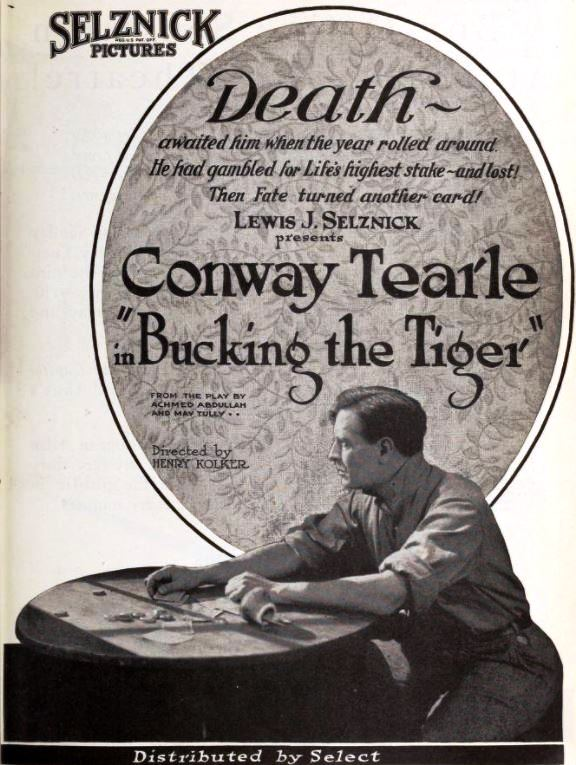
- Directed by: Henry Kolker
- Written by: Achmed Abdullah; Edward J. Montagne; May Tully
- Produced by: Lewis J. Selznick
- Starring: Conway Tearle; Winifred Westover; Gladden James
- Cinematography: Jacob A. Badaracco
- Production company: Selznick Pictures
- Distributed by: Select Pictures
- Release date: April 1921
- Running time: 60 minutes
- Country: United States
- Languages: Silent; English intertitles

Bucking the Tiger is a 1921 American silent drama film directed by Henry Kolker and starring Conway Tearle, Winifred Westover and Gladden James. As of October, 2019 it is considered a lost film by the Library of Congress.

== Plot ==
Five down on their luck miners meet at Eslick's Grand Palace Hotel in Circle, Alaska and discuss how they can recoup from their losses. Emily Dwyer uproots herself and moves to Alaska to marry Graham. Upon finding that he is broke, Emily tries to commit suicide and is saved by MacDonald, a former star football player. McDonald suggests to the group that they draw cards and buy an insurance policy premium on whomever draws the ace. Said person will commit suicide at the end of the year, thus allowing the rest to collect the money. MacDonald purposefully draws the ace card in order that Emily get the money from the premium.Before the year's end he discovers a vein of gold at his mine and abandons the plan, convinces the others to share in his newfound wealth, and starts romancing Emily.

== Cast ==
- Conway Tearle as Ritchie MacDonald
- Winifred Westover as Emily Dwyer
- Gladden James as Ralph Graham
- Helen Montrose as Skaguay Belle
- Harry Lee as Andy Walsh
- George A. Wright as The Count
- Templar Saxe as William Hillyer

== Bibliography ==
- Munden, Kenneth White. The American Film Institute Catalog of Motion Pictures Produced in the United States, Part 1. University of California Press, 1997.
