= Her Game =

1919 film by Frank Hall Crane

- Directed by: Frank Hall Crane
- Written by: John K. Holbrook
- Produced by: Tribune Productions Inc. A.J. Bimberg
- Starring: Florence Reed; Conway Tearle
- Cinematography: John K. Holbrook
- Distributed by: United Picture Theatres of America
- Release date: October 19, 1919
- Running time: 5 reels
- Country: USA
- Language: Silent..English titles

Her Game is a lost 1919 silent drama directed by Frank Hall Crane and starring Florence Reed and Conway Tearle.

== Cast ==
- Florence Reed - Carol Raymond
- Conway Tearle - Alan Rutherford/Bruce Armitage
- Jed Prouty - Bobby McAllister
- Florence Billings—Mildred Manning
- Mathilde Brundage - The Dragoness
