= Winifred Westover =

American actress (1899–1978)

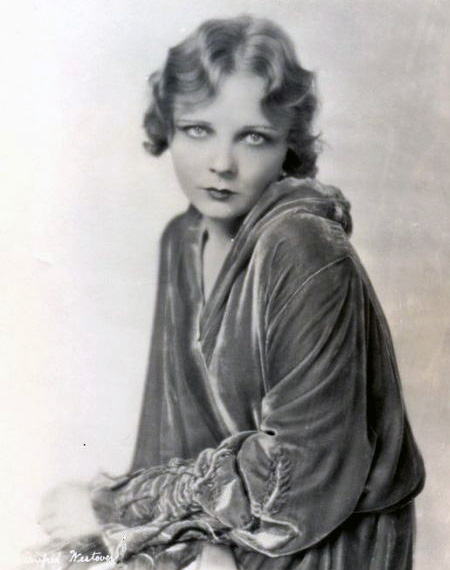
- Westover in the 1920s
- Born: November 9, 1899; San Francisco, California, U.S.
- Died: March 19, 1978 (aged 78); Los Angeles, California, U.S.
- Resting place: Westwood Memorial Park Cemetery
- Other names: Winifred Heide, Winifred Hart
- Occupation: Actress
- Years active: 1916–1930
- Spouse: William S. Hart (m. 1921; div. 1927)
- Children: 1

Winifred Westover, born Winifred Heide, (November 9, 1899 – March 19, 1978) was an actress of the 1910s and 1920s. Her career included films made in Hollywood, Sweden and New York.

== Early years ==
Winifred Helena Heide was the daughter of Thomas C. Heide and Sophia Heide. On July 14, 1904 Sophia Heide filed for divorce on the grounds of cruelty, non-support, and desertion. She later married Clyde C. Westover, a writer best known for his 1912 novel The Dragon’s Daughter.

When Winifred was thirteen years old she adopted her stepfather's last name. She graduated from the Dominican College of San Rafael.

== Career ==
In 1915, Westover met D. W. Griffith, and she was given several small roles in his epic 1916 film Intolerance.

In 1919, she starred in John Petticoats with western star William S. Hart. Hart took an interest in Westover, and introduced her to Thora Holm, who was looking for an actress to make films in Sweden. Westover went to Stockholm with her mother, and made three films there, before returning to the United States to make films in New York.

== Marriage and birth of son ==
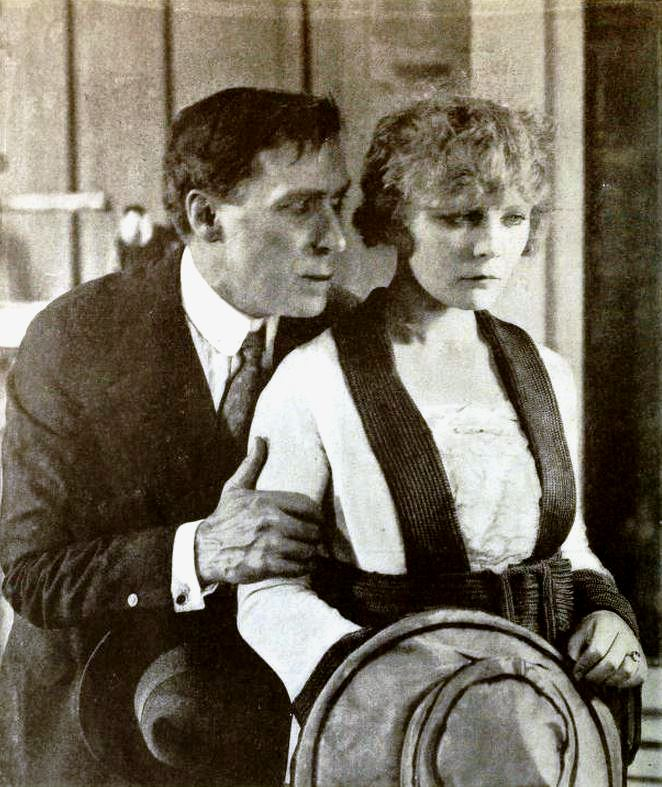
William S. Hart and Winifred Westover in John Petticoats

When Westover was working in New York City, William S. Hart came to see her, and escorted her to dinner and shows. She was about to sign a five year film contract with Lewis J. Selznick when Hart sent her a telegram, telling her not to sign anything until she’d received a letter that he was mailing to her. The letter contained a marriage proposal; she telegraphed her acceptance.

On December 7, 1921, Westover married Hart in Los Angeles. She was twenty-two years old, and Hart was fifty-seven. The only guests at the ceremony were Westover’s mother, Hart’s sister Mary, and Hart's attorney. On the day of her wedding, Westover signed an agreement to retire from acting.

Westover moved into the house shared by Hart and his invalid sister, Mary. Only six months into the marriage, Hart told his pregnant wife to leave his home, and she went to live with her mother in Santa Monica. During the divorce hearing, Westover testified that Hart’s sister was the reason for the separation, and that her husband had insisted on keeping open the door that separated their bedroom from his sister’s room.

The couple’s son, William S. Hart, Jr., was born on September 22, 1922. Hart went to see his child eight days later. On February 11, 1927, Westover was granted a divorce in Reno, Nevada. She received $100,000, with the understanding she would not return to acting or have her photograph published. A trust fund of $100,000 was established for her son, to be used for his support and education. William S. Hart, Jr. grew up to become a professor of land economics at the University of Southern California.

== Lummox ==
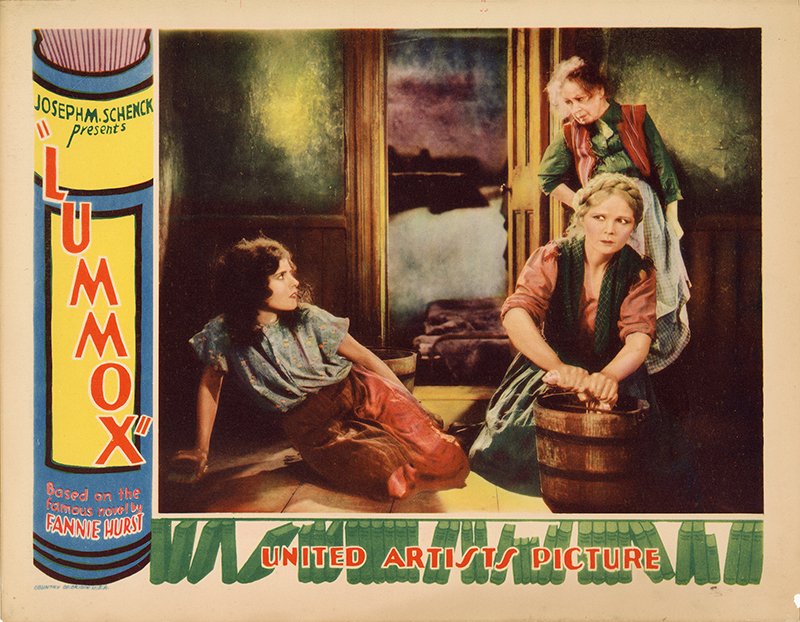
1930 Lummox ad

Westover petitioned the court for the right to act under her maiden name, and she was allowed to return to work. She had read the Fannie Hurst novel Lummox and wanted to star in the film version. She contacted both Hurst and the film’s director, Herbert Brenon, and was chosen for the role of Bertha Oberg in the 1930 film Lummox.

In order to portray the heavyset servant, who’d been given the derogatory nickname of Lummox, Westover ate fatty food, avoided exercise, and gained forty pounds. To help her appear to be a person who worked long hours of wearying labor, the director gave her shoes soled with fifteen pounds of lead, and had her wear a dress with five pounds of lead weights in the collar, five pounds of lead in each of the sleeve cuffs, and ten pounds of weights in the hem of her skirt.

She received praise for her acting, with one newspaper stating: "Winifred Westover’s characterization of the buxom servant girl, whose little world has been the drab atmosphere of cheap lodging houses, shabby humanity, and cruel employers, reaches heights rarely ever attained."

It has at times been incorrectly reported that she was nominated for an Academy Award for Best Actress for her performance in the film, but there is no record of such a nomination in the Academy Awards Database for the 1931 ceremony.

== Death ==
On March 19, 1978, Westover died in Santa Monica, where she had been living with her son. She was buried at Westwood Memorial Park Cemetery.

== Selected filmography ==
- Intolerance (1916)
- Microscope Mystery (1916)
- The Matrimaniac (1916)
- The Half-Breed (1916)
- Jim Bludso (1917) - Kate Taggart
- An Old-Fashioned Young Man (1917) - Mame Morton
- Cheerful Givers (1917) - Estella
- All the World to Nothing (1918)
- Hobbs in a Hurry (1918)
- All the World to Nothing (1918)
- Love (1919)
- John Petticoats (1919)
- This Hero Stuff (1919)
- Marked Men (1919)
- The Village Sleuth (1920)
- Old Lady 31 (1920) - Mary
- The Fighter (1921)
- Bucking the Tiger (1921)
- Is Life Worth Living? (1921)
- Anne of Little Smoky (1921) - Anne
- Love's Masquerade (1922)
- Lummox (1930)
