= Ralph Faulkner =

American fencer and actor

- Publicity Photo of Ralph Faulkner

Personal information
- Born: July 20, 1891 Abilene, Kansas, United States
- Died: January 27, 1987 (aged 95) Burbank, California, United States
- Spouse: Edith Jane

Sport
- Country: United States
- Sport: Fencing

Ralph Faulkner (July 20, 1891 – January 27, 1987) was an American fencer and film actor. He competed in the team sabre event at the 1932 Summer Olympics.

== Post-college career ==
After graduating from college Faulkner became a forest ranger. The majority of his time was spent in the wilderness of Washington (state). He then moved to New York, where he established himself as a stage performer and silent film actor.

== Introduction to fencing ==
During the filming of the 1922 film The Man from Glengarry, in which he portrayed a lumberjack, Faulkner fell and broke his left knee. Faulkner underwent surgery and move to Los Angeles. It was here he joined the Los Angeles Athletic Club and took up fencing as a way of recovering. Faulkner reportedly fenced for 50 hours a week until his knee had healed completely. After which, he began competing in organized amateur fencing tournaments around Southern California where he got the opportunity to learn from many accomplished fencers, including Lucien Gaudin, Philippe Cattiau, Oreste Puliti, and Roger Ducret. During this time in his life, Faulkner was making a living selling real estate.

== International fencing career ==
Faulkner won his first major sabre championship in 1928 and went on to compete in the 1928 Summer Olympics and the 1932 Summer Olympics. In the 1932 Los Angeles games the United States took fourth place in team sabre. It was the highest finish in the nation's history.

== Coaching ==
Faulkner opened Falcon Studios, a theatre and fencing school with his wife, Edith Jane. He coached many notable actors and actresses for staged swordplay and, himself returned to film in the mid 1930s. Additionally, Faulkner trained a number of fencers for competition including Polly Craus, Sewall Shurtz, and Janice Romary. He taught a classical French style which stressed form, bladework, and finger strength over agility and athleticism, characteristic of the Italian school. Eventually, he retired from film work but continued to teach all three weapons until he suffered a stroke following a Saturday fencing class. He died two weeks later on January 27, 1987, at the age of 95.

== Partial filmography ==
- War and the Woman (1917) - Minor Role
- On the Jump (1918) - Woodrow Wilson
- The Prussian Cur (1918) - Woodrow Wilson
- Why America Will Win (1918) - Woodrow Wilson
- Anne of Little Smoky (1921) - Tom Brockton
- Hope (1922, Short) - Pierre
- The Man from Glengarry (1922)
- April Showers (1923) - Champ Sullivan
- Loving Lies (1924) - Jack Ellis
- My Neighbor's Wife (1925) - William Jordan
- God of Mankind (1928)
- The Three Musketeers (1935) - Jussac (uncredited)
- The Prisoner of Zenda (1937) - Bersonin (uncredited)
- If I Were King (1938) - First Watch (uncredited)
- Dramatic School (1938) - Fencing Teacher (uncredited)
- The Star Maker (1939) - Fencing Master
- Zorro's Fighting Legion (1939, Serial) - Rodriguez - Henchman [Ch. 1] (uncredited)
- The Foxes of Harrow (1947) - Fencing Instructor (uncredited)
- Fireside Theatre (1953, TV Series) - Professor
- The Purple Mask (1955) - Opponent (uncredited)
- The Dinah Shore Show (1956, TV Series) - Himself
- The Ford Television Theatre (1957, TV Series) - Nourric
- Maverick (1958, TV Series) - Herr Ziegler
- Father Knows Best (1960) - Instructor
- Shirley Temple's Storybook (1961, TV Series) - Pirate
