= The Great Victory =

1919 film directed by Henry Otto

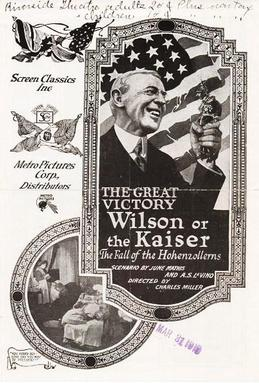
- Directed by: Henry Otto
- Written by: Maxwell Karger; Albert S. Le Vino; June Mathis
- Produced by: Maxwell Karger
- Starring: Creighton Hale; Florence Billings; Helen Ferguson
- Cinematography: George K. Hollister
- Production company: Screen Classics
- Distributed by: Metro Pictures
- Release date: January 1, 1919
- Running time: 70 minutes
- Country: United States
- Languages: Silent; English intertitles

The Great Victory or The Great Victory, Wilson or the Kaiser? The Fall of the Hohenzollerns is a 1919 American silent war drama film directed by Charles Miller and starring Creighton Hale, Florence Billings and Helen Ferguson. It was made as anti-German propaganda during World War I, although it was released after the end of the conflict.

== Synopsis ==
A young Alsatian is forced to enlist in the German Army on the outbreak of the war. Appalled by the atrocities committed by his colleagues, including against his own sister, he deserts having fallen in love with an American nurse. Vowing revenge, he travels to the United States and joins the American Army along with other Alsatians. They return to Europe and secure victory.

== Partial cast ==
- Creighton Hale as Conrad Le Brett
- Florence Billings as Vilma Le Brett
- Edward Connelly as Paul Le Brett
- Helen Ferguson as Amy Gordon
- Frank Currier as William Gordon
- Frederick Truesdell as Woodrow Wilson
- Henry Kolker as Kaiser Wilhelm II
- Joseph Kilgour as General Von Bissing
- Margaret McWade as Nurse Edith Cavell
- Earl Schenck as Lieutenant Ober / Crown Prince
- Henry Carvill as Count von Bismarck
- Florence Short as Elaine
- Baby Ivy Ward as Elaine's Child
- Andy Clark as Francois
- James A. Furey as Priest
- Fred R. Stanton as Sergeant Gross
- Leo Delaney as Frederick III
- Fanny Cogan as Empress Victoria
- Emil Hoch as General von Hindenburg
- Charles Edwards as Rev. Joseph Wilson
- May Allen as Mrs. Joseph Wilson
- Karl Dane as Von Bethmann Hollweg
- Carl De Mel as Count von Moltke

== Bibliography ==
- Laura Petersen Balogh. Karl Dane: A Biography and Filmography. McFarland, 2009.
