= Conway Tearle =

American actor (1878–1938)

Frederick Conway Tearle
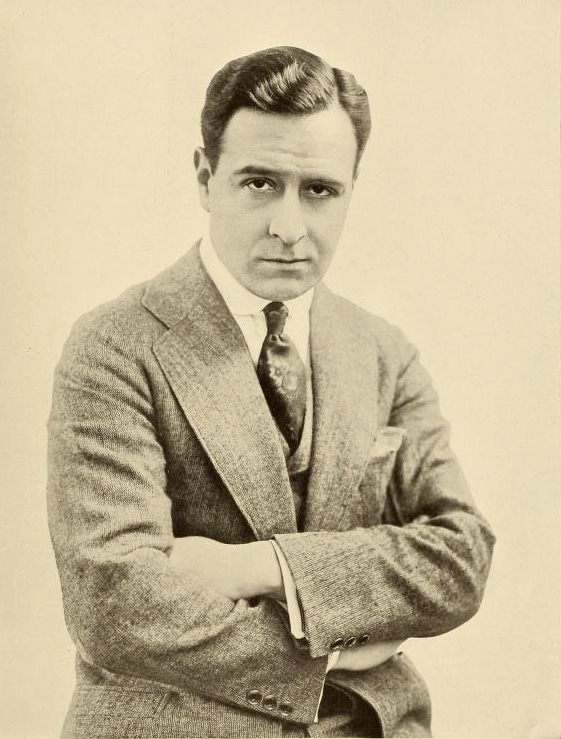
- Photo-Play Journal, 1917
- Born: Frederick Conway Levy; May 17, 1878; New York City, New York, U.S.
- Died: October 1, 1938 (aged 60); Los Angeles, California, U.S.
- Occupations: Stage and screen actor
- Years active: 1899–1937 (stage), 1914–1936 (film)
- Relatives: Godfrey Tearle (half-brother); Sarah Crocker Conway (grandmother)

Conway Tearle (born Frederick Conway Levy, May 17, 1878 – October 1, 1938) was an American stage actor who went on to perform in silent and early sound films.

== Early life ==
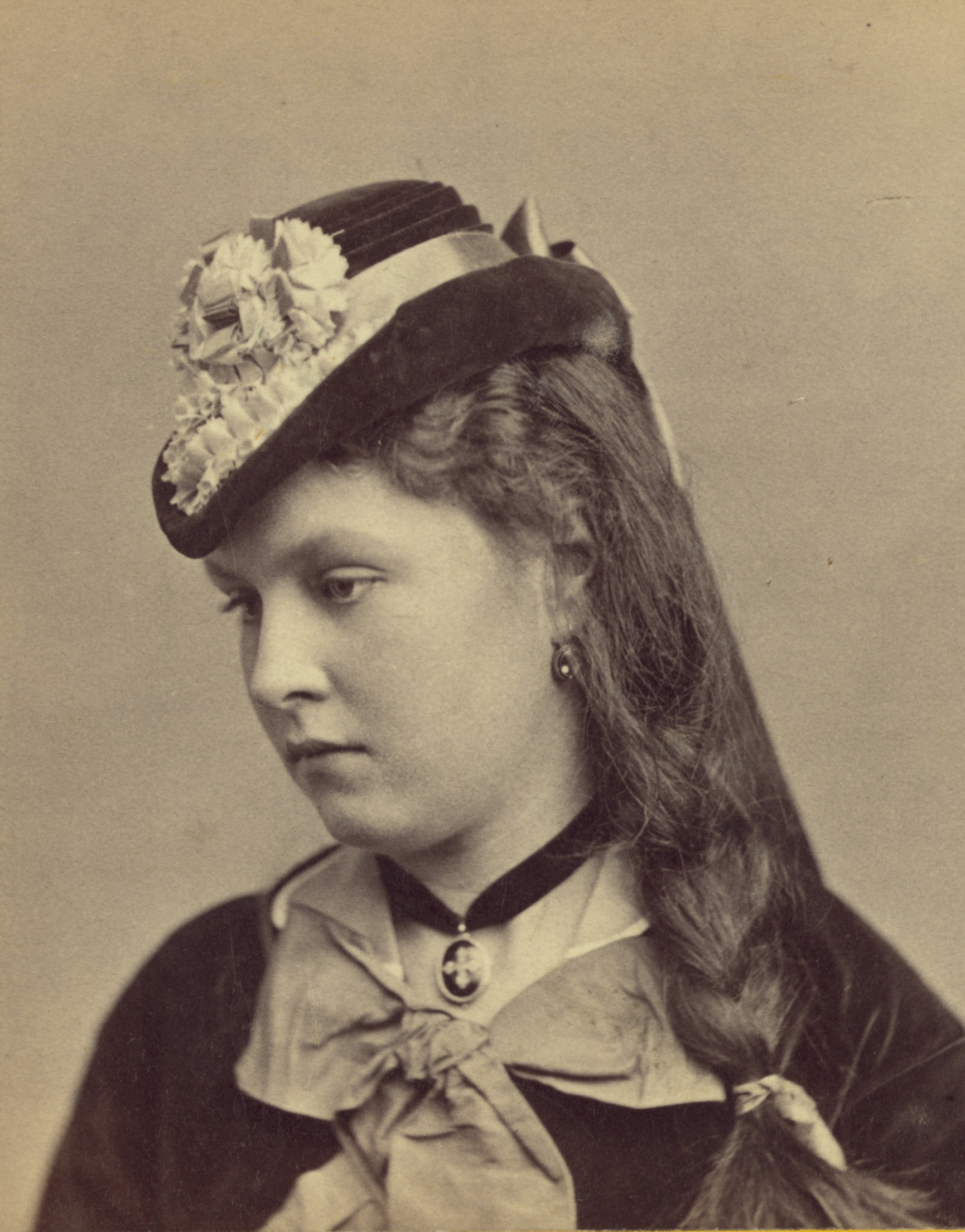
Minnie Conway, Tearle's mother

Tearle was born on May 17, 1878, in New York City, the son of the well-known British-born cornetist Jules Levy and American actress Marianne "Minnie" Conway. Tearle also had a sister, and a half-brother, musician Jules Levy, Jr., from his father's previous marriage. Minnie's mother was stage actress Sarah Crocker Conway. Minnie Conway was a direct descendant of William Augustus Conway, a British Shakespearean actor who became popular in America during the 1820s. Her father, the proprietor of the Brooklyn Theatre, was said to have organized the first stock company in America. After Tearle's parents separated, his mother married Osmond Tearle, a British Shakespearean actor popular in "the provinces". Two half brothers, Godfrey and Malcolm Tearle, were born from Marianne's marriage to Osmond Tearle. Conway Levy was educated in England and America and took to the stage at an early age. By the age of ten he could recite twelve Shakespearean plays from memory. As an adult he adopted his step-father's surname to become Conway Tearle. His big break came at the age of twenty-one when in Manchester, England, without any preparation, he was called upon to play Hamlet after the lead actor took ill just prior to the first act.

== Career ==
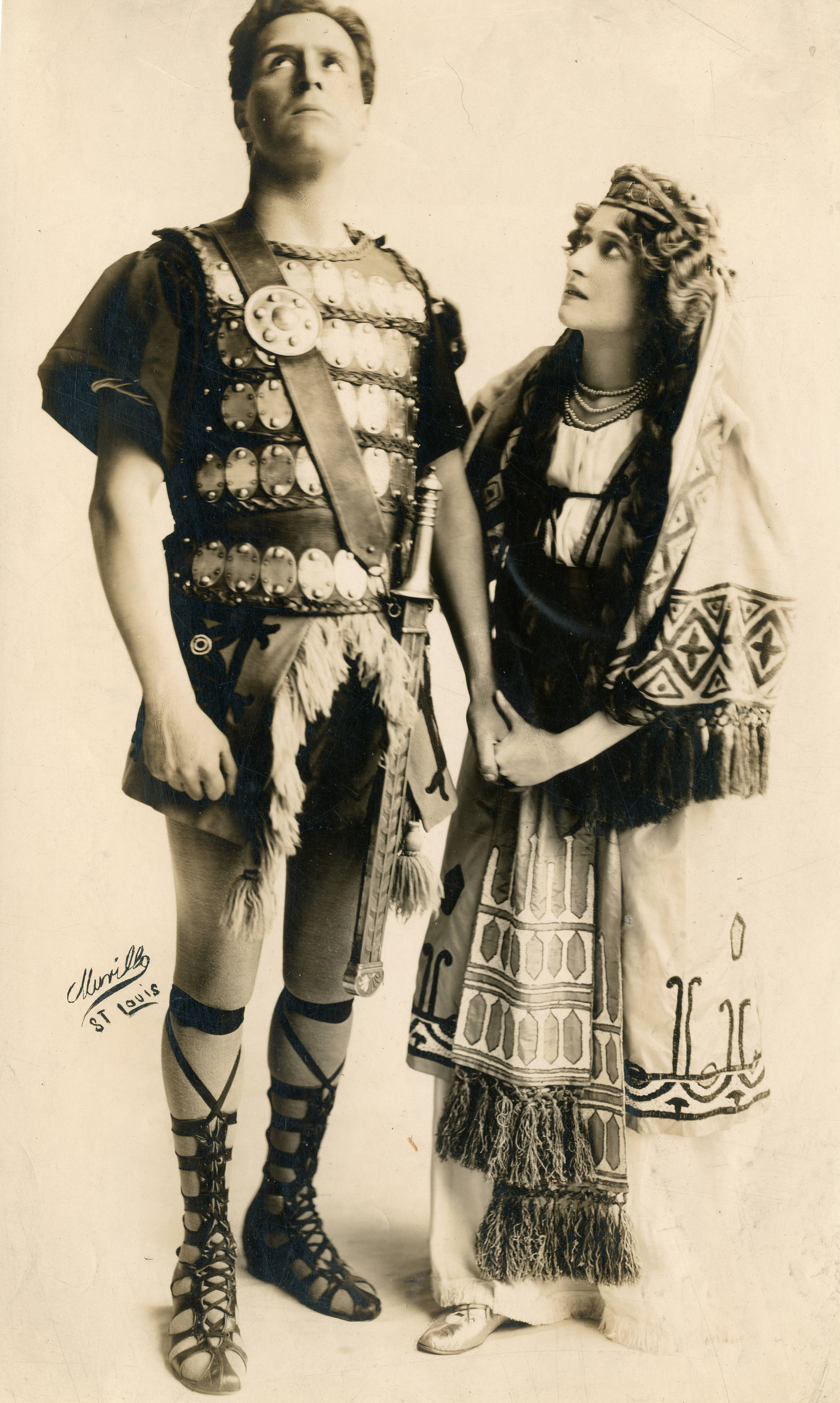
Tearle (left) starring in the 1908–1909 touring production of Ben-Hur

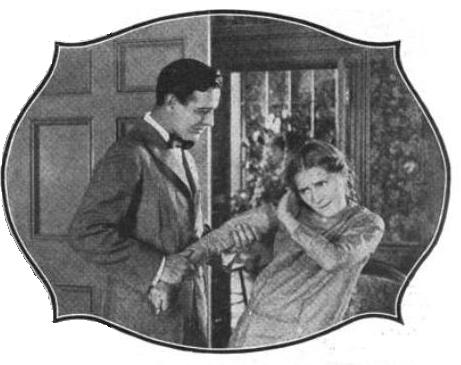
Tearle with Mary Pickford in the silent film Stella Maris (1918)

Tearle's performance that night led to his first appearance on the London stage playing the Viscomte de Chauvin, the lead role in The Queen's Double, on April 27, 1901, at the Garrick Theatre. He next toured Australia playing the title role in Ben Hur for some months before returning to London to star in the play The Best of Friends at the Theatre Royal. Tearle divided the following four seasons equally with companies headed by Ellen Terry and Sir Charles Wyndham. In 1905 Tearle returned to America to play opposite Grace George in the short-lived play Abigail. Over the next eight years or so Tearle played in a number of Broadway productions that failed to excite New York audiences. He did at times though garner singular praise for his performances in such plays as The New York Idea, The Liars, Major Barbara, and others. In 1908/09 Tearle reprised his title role in a lavish Klaw and Erlanger road production of Ben Hur.

Tearle turned to Hollywood in 1914 where he would find considerable success playing romantic leads. His first film was The Nightingale, a story by Augustus Thomas about a slum girl (Ethel Barrymore) who rose to be a great opera star. His last was in a 1936 film adaptation of Shakespeare's Romeo and Juliet with John Barrymore. Tearle appeared in some 93 films over his career and at one point was thought to be the highest-paid actor in America. On December 16, 1931, Conway appeared with co-star Kay Francis at the grand opening of the Paramount Theater in Oakland, California, which hosted the premiere of their film The False Madonna, released by Paramount Pictures.

The following year Tearle scored a major hit on Broadway in the original 1932 production of Dinner at Eight, creating the role of fading screen idol Larry Renault, a role that would later be played on film by John Barrymore. His last two Broadway appearances were in short productions of Living Dangerously in 1935 and Antony and Cleopatra two years later.

== Marriages ==
Conway Tearle married for the first time in 1901 in Sunderland, England. In 1908 Tearle filed for a divorce in Reno, Nevada on grounds of desertion, stating that his wife, Gertrude Tearle, had left him several years earlier.

His second wife, actress Josephine Park, sued for divorce in March 1912 after learning that Tearle had set sail for Italy aboard the S.S. Amerika with actress Roberta Hill. Roberta's name had earlier appeared in print as a co-respondent in a divorce suit filed by the wife of John Jacob Astor.

Tearle's third wife, Roberta Hill, filed for a divorce in 1916 after detectives she hired found him in a hotel room with Adele Rowland, a musical-comedy actress and singer. The two claimed they were just rehearsing a play. As Rowland explained later: "As to the robe in which I was clad, it's the custom in the profession to read plays attired like that."

Tearle and Rowland wed in February 1918, remaining together until his death some twenty years later.

== Death ==
One of Tearle's last starring roles was in Hey Diddle Diddle, a comedy play written by Bartlett Cormack. The play premiered in Princeton, New Jersey, on January 21, 1937, and also featured Lucille Ball playing the part of Julie Tucker, "one of three roommates coping with neurotic directors, confused executives, and grasping stars who interfere with the girls' ability to get ahead." The play received good reviews, but there were problems, chiefly with its star, because Tearle was in poor health. Cormack wanted to replace him, but the producer, Anne Nichols, said the fault lay with the character and insisted the part needed to be reshaped and rewritten. The two were unable to agree on a solution. The play was scheduled to open on Broadway at the Vanderbilt Theatre, but closed after one week in Washington, D.C., due in part to Tearle's declining health.

On October 1, 1938, Tearle died from a heart attack in the Hollywood district of Los Angeles.

== Filmography ==
- The Nightingale (1914) as Charles Marden (film debut)
- Shore Acres (1914) as Sam Warner
- The Seven Sisters (1915) as Count Horkoy
- Helene of the North (1915) as Ralph Connell, aka Lord Traverse
- Poor Schmaltz (1915) as Jack
- The Foolish Virgin (1916) as Jim Anthony
- The Common Law (1916) as Neville
- The Heart of the Hills (1916) as Redgell
- The Fall of the Romanoffs (1917) as Prince Felix Yussepov
- The Judgment House (1917) as Ian Stafford
- The World for Sale (1918) as Ingolby
- Stella Maris (1918) as John Risca - also Spelled Riska
- Virtuous Wives (1918) as Andrew Forrester
- The Way of a Woman (1919) as Anthony Weir
- Atonement (1919) as Theodore Proctor
- Her Game (1919) as Alan Rutherford/Bruce Armitage
- The Mind the Paint Girl (1919) as Capt. Nicholas Jeyes
- A Virtuous Vamp (1919) as Jame Crowninshield
- Human Desire (1919) as Robert Lane
- Two Weeks (1920) as Kenneth Maxwell
- She Loves and Lies (1920) as Ernest Lismore
- The Forbidden Woman (1920) as Malcolm Kent
- April Folly (1920) as Kerry Sarle
- Marooned Hearts (1920) as Dr. Paul Carrington
- Whispering Devils (1920) as Rev. Michael Faversham
- The Road of Ambition (1920) as Bill Matthews
- Society Snobs (1921) as Lorenzo Carilo/Duke d'Amunzi
- The Oath (1921) as Hugh Coleman
- Bucking the Tiger (1921) as Ritchie MacDonald
- The Fighter (1921) as Caleb Conover
- After Midnight (1921) as Gordon Phillips/Wallace Phillips
- A Man of Stone (1921) as Capt. Deering
- Shadows of the Sea (1922) as Captain Dick Carson
- A Wide Open Town (1922) as Billy Clifford
- Love's Masquerade (1922) as Russell Carrington
- The Referee (1922) as John McArdle
- The Eternal Flame (1922) as Général de Montriveau
- One Week of Love (1922) as Buck Fearnley
- Bella Donna (1923) as Mahmoud Baroudi
- The Rustle of Silk (1923) as Arthur Fallaray
- Ashes of Vengeance (1923) as Rupert de Vrieac
- The Common Law (1923) as Louis Neville
- The Dangerous Maid (1923) as Capt. Miles Prothero
- Black Oxen (1923) as Lee Clavering
- The Next Corner (1924) as Robert Maury
- Lilies of the Field (1924) as Louis Willing
- The White Moth (1924) as Vantine Morley
- Flirting with Love (1924) as Wade Cameron
- The Great Divide (1925) as Stephen Ghent
- Bad Company (1925) as James Hamilton
- The Heart of a Siren (1925) as Gerald Rexford
- School for Wives (1925) as Richard Keith
- Just a Woman (1925) as Robert Holton
- The Mystic (1925) as Michael Nash
- Morals for Men (1925) as Joe Strickland
- The Dancer of Paris (1926) as Noel Anson
- Dancing Mothers (1926) as Jerry Naughton
- The Greater Glory (1926) as Count Maxim von Hurtig
- The Sporting Lover (1926) as Captain Terrance Connaughton
- My Official Wife (1926) as Alexander, aka Sascha
- Altars of Desire (1927) as David Elrod
- Enemies of Society (1927) as Dr. William Matthews
- The Isle of Forgotten Women (1927) as Bruce Paine
- Smoke Bellew (1929) as Kit 'Smoke' Bellew
- Gold Diggers of Broadway (1929) as Stephen Lee
- Evidence (1929) as Harold Courtenay
- The Lost Zeppelin (1929) as Commander Donald Hall
- The Truth About Youth (1930) as Richard Carewe
- The Lady Who Dared (1931) as Jack Norton
- Captivation (1931) as Hugh Somerton
- Pleasure (1931) as Gerald Whitney
- Morals for Women (1931) as Van Dyne
- The False Madonna (1931) as Grant Arnold
- Vanity Fair (1932) as Rawdon Crawley
- Man About Town (1932) as Bob Ashley
- The Hurricane Express (1932) as Stevens
- The King Murder (1932) as Detective Chief Henry Barton
- Her Mad Night (1932) as Steven Kennedy
- Day of Reckoning (1933) as George Hollins
- Should Ladies Behave (1933) as Max Lawrence
- Stingaree (1934) as Sir Julian Kent
- Fifteen Wives (1934) as Insp. Decker Dawes
- Sing Sing Nights (1934) as Floyd Harding Cooper
- The Headline Woman (1935) as Police Commissioner Frank Desmond
- Trails End (1935) as Jim 'Trigger' Malloy
- The Judgement Book (1935) as Steve Harper
- Desert Guns (1936) as Kirk Allenby/Bob Enright
- Senor Jim (1936) as Jim Stafford
- Klondike Annie (1936) as Vance Palmer
- The Preview Murder Mystery (1936) as Edwin Strange
- Romeo and Juliet (1936) as Prince Escalus
