= Is Life Worth Living? =

1921 film

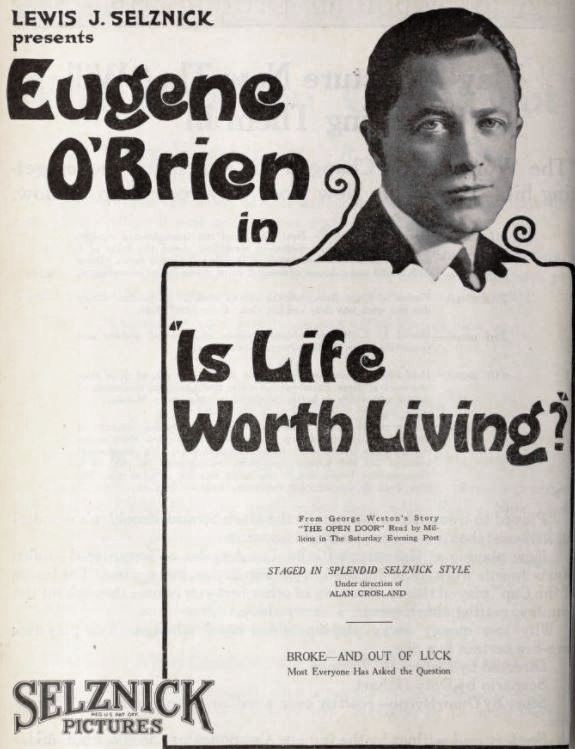
- Directed by: Alan Crosland
- Written by: George Weston
- Produced by: Lewis J. Selznick
- Starring: Eugene O'Brien; Winifred Westover; Arthur Housman
- Cinematography: Jules Cronjager
- Production company: Selznick Pictures
- Distributed by: Select Pictures
- Release date: June 1921
- Running time: 66 minutes
- Country: United States
- Language: Silent (English intertitles)

Is Life Worth Living? is a 1921 American silent drama film directed by Alan Crosland and starring Eugene O'Brien, Winifred Westover and Arthur Housman.

== Plot ==
Released on suspended sentence after being tried for a crime of which he is innocent, Melville Marley becomes a salesman for a typewriter-supply house. Unable to succeed in this venture, he buys a revolver in a pawnshop and goes to Central Park to kill himself. There he encounters Lois, a young girl who faints from despair and hunger on a park bench, and after taking her to his boardinghouse and securing her accommodation, he sets out with new determination and turns in a large order. Receiving a credit extension, he goes into business for himself; and with help from Lois, his new stenographer, a thriving business develops, and so does their love.

== Cast ==
- Eugene O'Brien as Melville Marley
- Winifred Westover as Lois Mason
- Arthur Housman as Jimmy Colton
- George Lessey as Lawyer
- Warren Cook as Joseph Gordon
- Arthur Donaldson as Isaac - Pawnbroker
- Florida Kingsley as Mrs. Grant

== Preservation status ==
A copy survives in the Museum of Modern Art archives.

== Bibliography ==
- Monaco, James. The Encyclopedia of Film. Perigee Books, 1991.
