= Anne of Little Smoky =

1921 American silent romantic drama film

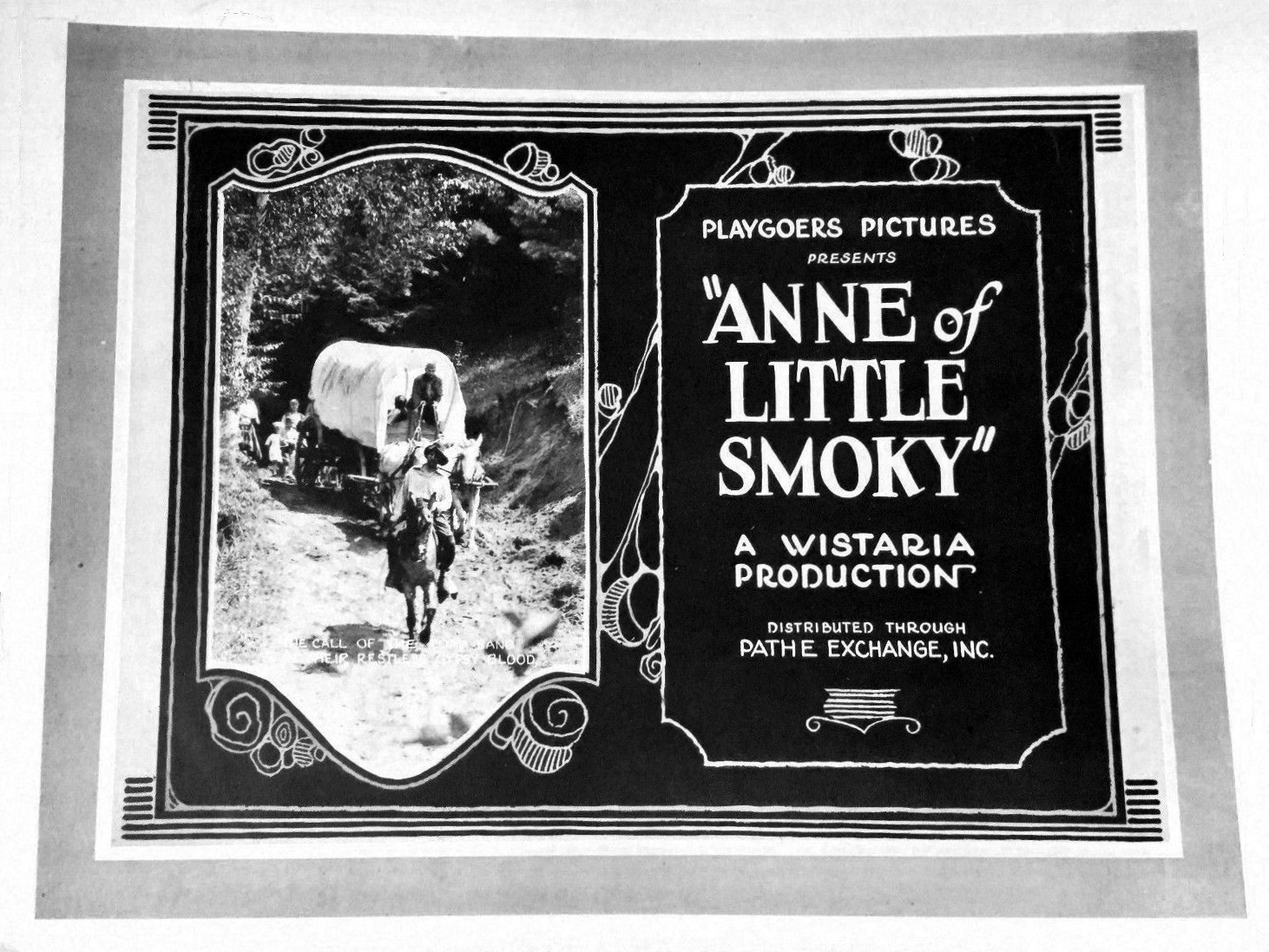
- Lobby card
- Directed by: Edward Connor
- Written by: Frank S. Beresford
- Story by: Edward Connor
- Starring: Winifred Westover; Dolores Cassinelli; Joe King; Frank Hagney; Ralph Faulkner
- Cinematography: John Stumar
- Production company: Wisteria Productions
- Distributed by: Playgoers Pictures
- Release date: November 20, 1921
- Running time: 5 reels
- Country: United States
- Language: Silent (English intertitles)

Anne of Little Smoky is a 1921 American silent romantic drama film directed by Edward Connor and starring Winifred Westover, Dolores Cassinelli, Joe King, Frank Hagney, and Ralph Faulkner. The film was released by Playgoers Pictures on November 20, 1921.

== Plot ==
Set in the Kentucky mountains. The Brockton family consider Little Smoky to be their mountain, but the government declares it to be a forest and game preserve. Forest ranger Bob Hayne is in love with Anne Brockton, but when he catches her father, Ed, poaching game he tries to arrest him. The two men fight, and Brockton is believed to have died. When bloodhounds are set on Bob’s trail Anne dresses in some of his clothing in an attempt to confuse the hounds following his scent. Anne finds her father alive in the forest ranger’s cabin.

Meanwhile Gita, a gypsy girl, is attacked by a renegade Indian. Anne’s brother Tom, who suffered shell-shock during the first World War, rescues Gita. The incident brings Tom back to his senses.

Ed Brockton becomes friends with Bob, and allows him to court Anne. Tom and Gita fall in love, and both couples look forward to a happy future.

== Cast ==
- Winifred Westover as Anne
- Dolores Cassinelli as Gita
- Joe King as Bob Hayne
- Frank Hagney as Ed Brockton
- Ralph Faulkner as Tom Brockton
- Harold Callahan as Buddy
- Alice Chapin as Mrs. Brockton
- Frank Sheridan as The Brockton
- Edward Roseman as Sam Ward

== Preservation ==
Anne of Little Smoky is now considered lost.
