= John Petticoats =

1919 film by Lambert Hillyer

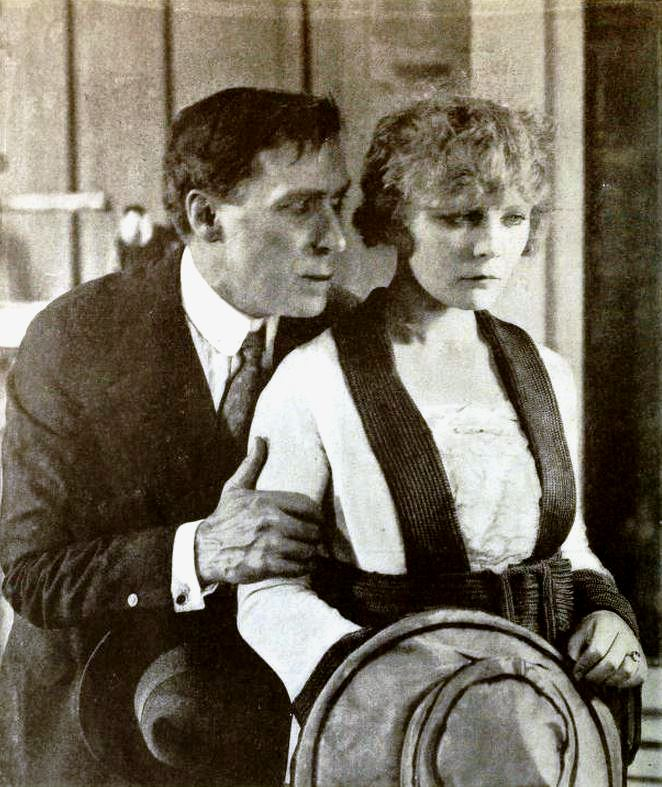
- Film still showing William S. Hart with Winifred Westover
- Directed by: Lambert Hillyer
- Screenplay by: C. Gardner Sullivan
- Produced by: Thomas H. Ince
- Starring: William S. Hart; Walt Whitman; George Webb; Winifred Westover; Ethel Shannon; Andrew Arbuckle
- Cinematography: Joseph H. August
- Production companies: William S. Hart Productions; Famous Players–Lasky Corporation
- Distributed by: Paramount Pictures
- Release date: November 2, 1919
- Running time: 50 minutes
- Country: United States
- Language: Silent (English intertitles)

John Petticoats is a 1919 American silent action film directed by Lambert Hillyer and written by C. Gardner Sullivan. The film stars William S. Hart, Walt Whitman, George Webb, Winifred Westover, Ethel Shannon, and Andrew Arbuckle. The film was released on November 2, 1919, by Paramount Pictures.

== Plot ==
As described in a film magazine, John Haynes, a lumberman known as "Hardwood," receives a letter informing him that he has inherited a business establishment in New Orleans. Surprised, although pleasantly so, he goes to that city to look over his heritage and finds that the business consists of a shop merchandising ladies' ware. In charge of the shop is Rosalie Andre, whom he lets continue with the management of the store, with Hardwood John boarding with Judge Clay Emerson Meredith and keeping his identity secret. Caroline, the Judge's granddaughter, soon attracts John's attention, and mutual love ripens. Rosalie comes to grief at the hands of one Wayne Page, the dissolute son of a rich family who is also a rival for the hand of Caroline, and John is required to use force to see that Wayne does the wronged young woman justice. John and Caroline then look forward to their happiness.

== Cast ==
- William S. Hart as 'Hardwood' John Haynes
- Walt Whitman as Judge Clay Emerson Meredith
- George Webb as Wayne Page
- Winifred Westover as Caroline Meredith
- Ethel Shannon as Rosalie Andre
- Andrew Arbuckle as Rameses

== Preservation ==
A copy of John Petticoats is in the Library of Congress, the Museum of Modern Art film archive, and the Gosfilmofond Archive.
