= William S. Hart =

American actor (1864–1946)

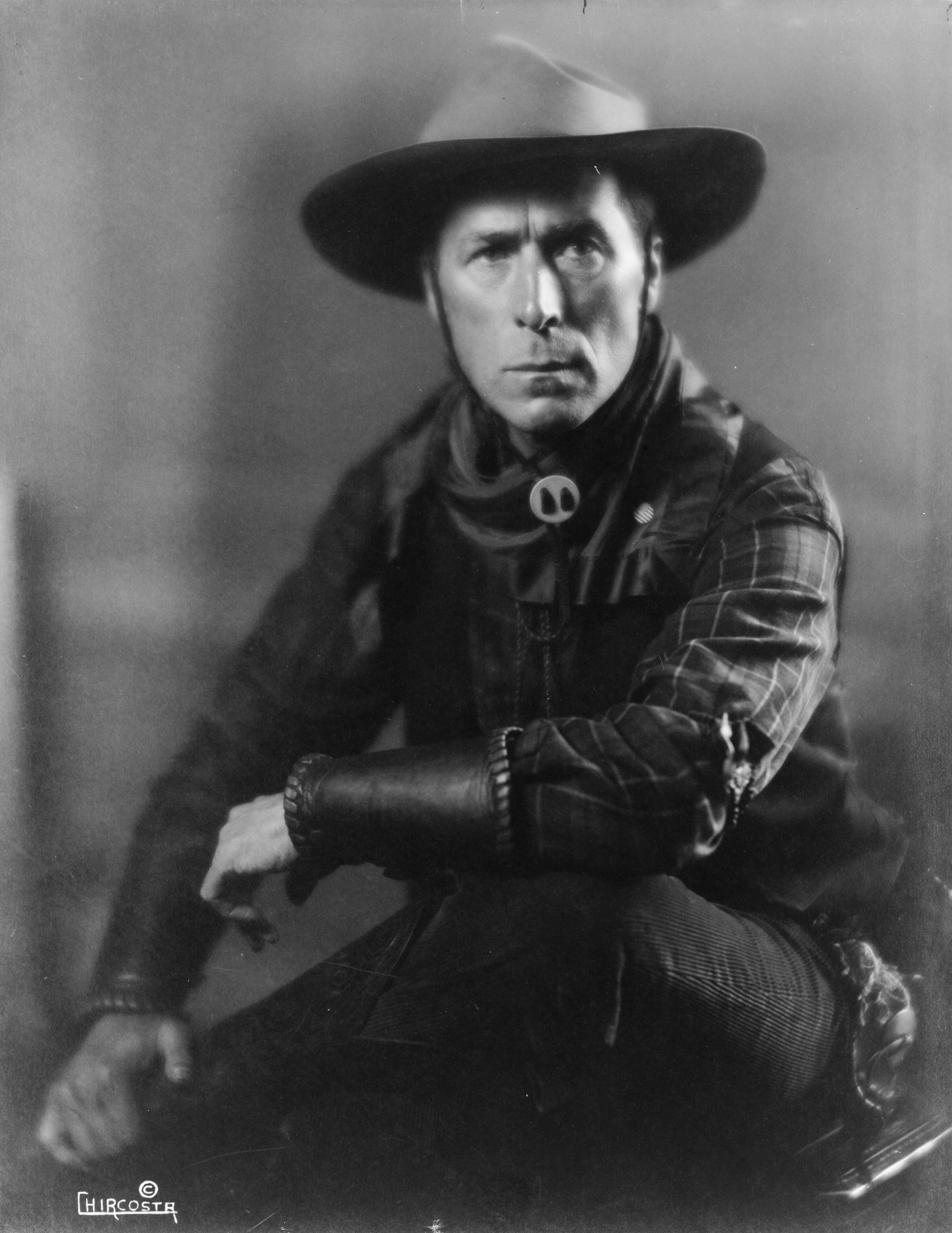
- Hart, c. 1918
- Born: William Surrey Hart; December 6, 1864; Newburgh, New York, U.S.
- Died: June 23, 1946 (aged 81); Newhall, California, U.S.
- Occupations: Actor; screenwriter; director; producer
- Years active: 1888–1941
- Spouse: Winifred Westover (m. 1921; div. 1927)
- Children: 1

Signature
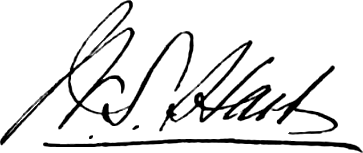

William Surrey Hart (December 6, 1864 – June 23, 1946) was an American silent film actor, screenwriter, director and producer. He is remembered as a foremost Western star of the silent era who "imbued all of his characters with honor and integrity". During the late 1910s and early 1920s, he was one of the most consistently popular movie stars, frequently ranking high among male actors in popularity contests held by movie fan magazines.

== Early life ==
Hart was born in Newburgh, New York, to Nicholas Hart (c. 1834–1895) and Rosanna Hart (c. 1839–1909). William had two brothers, who died very young, and four sisters. His father was born in England, and his mother was born in Ireland. He was a distant cousin of the western star Neal Hart.

He began his acting career on stage in his 20s, with his 1888 debut performance as a member of a company headed by Daniel E. Bandmann. The following year he joined Lawrence Barrett's company in New York and later spent several seasons with Mlle. Hortense Rhéa's traveling company. He toured and traveled extensively while trying to make a name for himself as an actor, and for a time directed shows at the Asheville Opera House in North Carolina, around the year 1900. He had some success as a Shakespearean actor on Broadway, working with Margaret Mather and other stars; he appeared in the original 1899 stage production of Ben-Hur. His family had moved to Asheville but, after his youngest sister Lotta died of typhoid fever in 1901, they all left together for Brooklyn until William went back on tour.

== Film career ==
"Demanding realism in his [film] settings, Hart knew that it was not merely his physical presence, but the entire design of his films that audiences recognized. They knew a Bill Hart film from a Broncho Billy through the integration of landscape and action, the characteristic dilemmas of the protagonists and the gritty realism of the studio interiors. Hart was obsessed with all these details, and made sure they dominated the screen 100 per cent of the time."—Film historian Richard Koszarski in Hollywood Directors: 1914–1940 (1976)

Hart went on to become one of the first great stars of the motion picture Western. Fascinated by the Old West, he acquired Billy the Kid's "six shooters" and was a friend of legendary lawmen Wyatt Earp and Bat Masterson. He entered films in 1914, and after playing supporting roles in two short films, he achieved stardom the same year as the lead in the feature The Bargain. Hart was particularly interested in making realistic Western films. His films are noted for their authentic costumes and props, as well as Hart's acting ability, honed on Shakespearean theater stages in the United States and England.

Beginning in 1915, Hart starred in his own series of two-reel Western short subjects for producer Thomas Ince, which were so popular that they were supplanted by a series of feature films. Many of Hart's early films continued to play in theaters, under new titles, for another decade. In 1915 and 1916 exhibitors voted him the biggest money making star in the United States. In 1917 Hart accepted a lucrative offer from Adolph Zukor to join Famous Players–Lasky, which merged into Paramount Pictures. In the films Hart began to ride a brown and white pinto he called Fritz. Fritz was the forerunner of later famous movie horses known by their own name, e.g., horses like Tom Mix's Tony, Roy Rogers's Trigger and Clayton Moore's Silver. In 1917, to signify "his patriotism and loyalty to Uncle Sam" it was announced he would "change the name of his favorite horse from Fritz to one more truly American". He also volunteered from 1917 to 1918 with the Four Minute Men program to give short pro-war speeches across the country. Hart was now making feature films exclusively, and films like Square Deal Sanderson and The Toll Gate were popular with fans.

In 1919 Hart's John Petticoats costar was a young actress named Winifred Westover. The film was made in New Orleans, and was a departure from Hart's usual roles, as he played a lumberman who was informed he'd inherited a shop selling ladies clothing.

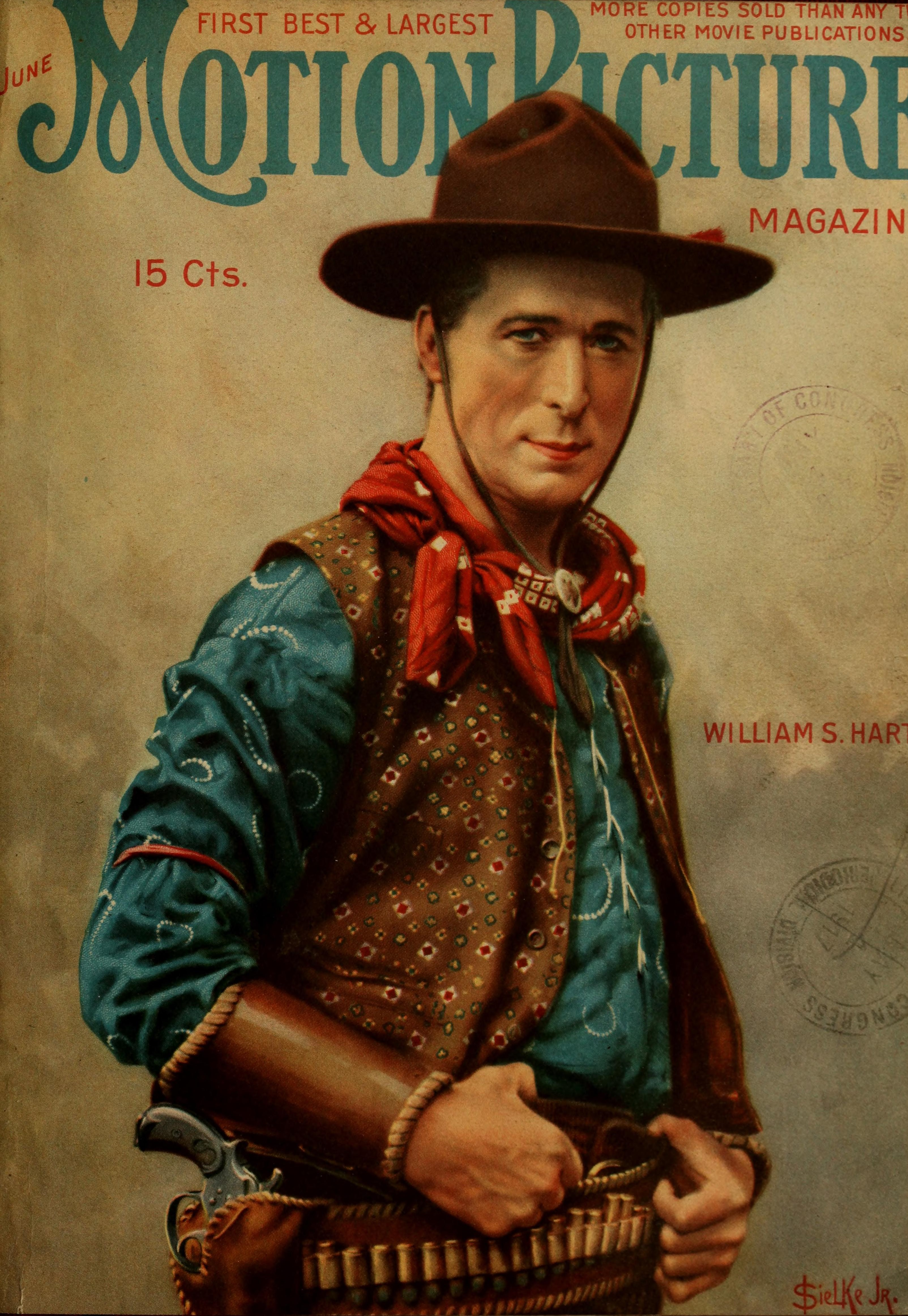
Hart on the June 1917 cover of Motion Picture Magazine

In 1921, Hollywood comic actor Roscoe Arbuckle was charged with rape and manslaughter in the death of aspiring actress Virginia Rappe. Amid the controversy, many of Arbuckle's fellow actors declined public comment on the case. However, Hart, who had never worked with Arbuckle or even met him, made a number of damaging public statements in which he presumed the actor's guilt. Arbuckle, who was eventually acquitted but saw his career ruined, later wrote a premise for a film parodying Hart as a thief, bully and wife beater, and it was bought by Buster Keaton. Arbuckle's idea was produced the next year as the Keaton vehicle The Frozen North. As a result, Hart refused to speak to Keaton for many years.

By the early 1920s, Hart's brand of gritty, rugged Westerns with drab costumes and moralistic themes gradually fell out of fashion. The public became attracted by a new kind of movie cowboy, epitomized by Tom Mix, who wore flashier costumes and was involved in more action scenes. Paramount dropped Hart, who then made one last bid for his kind of Western. He produced Tumbleweeds (1925) with his own money, arranging to release it independently through United Artists. The film turned out well, with an epic land-rush sequence, but did only fair business at the box office. Hart was angered by United Artists' failure to promote his film properly and sued the studio. The legal proceedings dragged on for years, and the courts finally ruled in Hart's favor, in 1940.

== Career eclipse ==
After Tumbleweeds, Hart retired to his Newhall, California, ranch home, "La Loma de los Vientos", which was designed by architect Arthur R. Kelly, and made no further feature films. An unsigned newspaper report of 1929 commented on his withdrawal from the Hollywood scene: "With the exception of brief appearances in the street, Hollywood has seen little of Hart and it has been said that Bill's marital troubles broke his heart. Few of his old friends expected he would ever return to the screen. His only public appearance in recent years was at the funeral of Wyatt Earp, western pioneer, when a very solemn Hart slipped in from his mountain retreat to be a pallbearer."

The new era of talking pictures presented opportunities for Hart, as pioneer producer Hal Roach offered Hart the lead in an all-talking outdoor western feature. Hart signed a $75,000 contract with Roach in May 1929, with the expectation that his old colleague Lambert Hillyer would be on hand to direct. The project was canceled when Roach's distributor, Metro-Goldwyn-Mayer, intervened. MGM executive Nicholas Schenck wired Roach: "Sorry you have undertaken to produce a talking western picture, because we would not be interested in it, and we do not think you should undertake to make pictures for anybody else. If you have already signed, then you have our consent to release this one elsewhere, but we do not expect you to do this again." Hart consented to the cancellation and forfeited the salary agreed upon. According to columnist Louella Parsons, "The Metro-Goldwyn-Mayer officials explained it was not a personal reflection against Hart, but rather an earnest belief that these western thrillers were no longer what the public wanted. F. W. Murnau and Robert Flaherty are negotiating with Bill Hart to put him at the head of his own unit. Tiffany-Stahl has agreed, so it is rumored, to release these talking westerns. Let's all hold a good thought for old Bill that this deal will not get sidetracked."

Plans fell through for Hart's talking westerns, and it wasn't until 1939 that William S. Hart appeared in his only sound film, a spoken prologue for a reissue of Tumbleweeds. In this segment, filmed at his ranch, the 74-year-old Hart reflected on the Old West and fondly recalled his silent movie heyday. The speech turned out to be his farewell to the screen. Astor Pictures released the film to tremendous response and Hart appeared in person, for the first time in 15 years, at the Hollywood premiere. Most prints and video versions of Tumbleweeds circulating today include the speech.

== Personal life ==
Hart was always close to his sister Mary, and when he moved to California she came with him. In his autobiography My Life East and West, he called Mary "my constant advisor," and stated that she took care of his fan mail. Mary is listed as cowriter for two of his published books, Pinto Ben and Other Stories (1919), and And All Points West (1940).

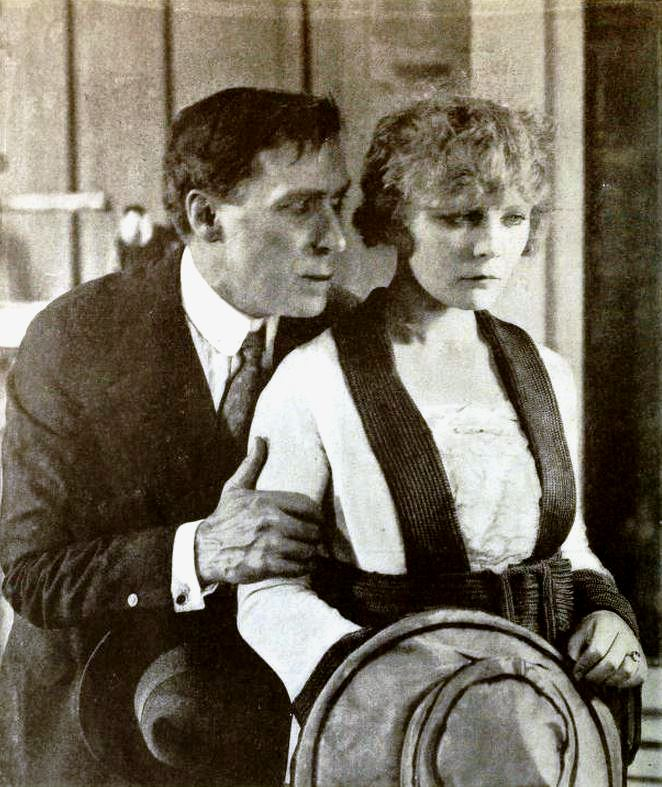
William S. Hart and Winifred Westover in John Petticoats

When Winifred Westover, Hart's John Petticoats costar, was working in New York City Hart came to see her, and escorted her to dinner and shows. She was about to sign a five-year film contract with Lewis J. Selznick when Hart sent her a telegram, telling her not to sign anything until she'd received a letter he was mailing to her. The letter contained a marriage proposal. She telegraphed her acceptance.

On December 7, 1921, Hart married Westover in Los Angeles. She was 22 years old, and Hart was 57. The only guests were the bride's mother, Hart's sister Mary, and his attorney. On the day of her wedding Westover signed an agreement to retire from acting.

Westover moved into the house shared by Hart and his sister, Mary. Six months into the marriage Hart told his pregnant wife to leave his home, and she went to live with her mother in Santa Monica. During the divorce hearing Westover testified that Hart's sister was the reason for the separation, and that her husband had insisted on keeping open the door that separated their bedroom from his sister's room.

The couple's son, William S. Hart Jr., was born on September 22, 1922. On February 11, 1927, Westover was granted a divorce in Reno, Nevada. She received $100,000, with the understanding she would not return to acting or have her photograph published. A trust fund of $100,000 was established for William S. Hart Jr., to be used for his support and education.

Hart's son lived with his mother, and spent little time with his father, but when Hart's sister Mary died in 1943 it was reported that the "tall, erect cowboy" entered the funeral service "leaning on the arm of his son, William S. Hart, Jr."

== Death ==
Hart died on June 23, 1946, in Newhall, California, at the age of 81. He was buried in Green-Wood Cemetery in Brooklyn, New York. His last will and testament stated: "I have made no provision in this will for my son for the reason that I have amply provided for him during my lifetime."

== Dedications ==
For his contribution to the motion picture industry, William S. Hart has a star on the Hollywood Walk of Fame at 6363 Hollywood Blvd. In 1975, he was inducted into the Western Performers Hall of Fame at the National Cowboy & Western Heritage Museum in Oklahoma City, Oklahoma.

As part of the Natural History Museum of Los Angeles County, California, Hart's former home and 260-acre (1.1 km^{2}) ranch in Newhall is now William S. Hart Park. The William S. Hart High School District as well as William S. Hart Senior High School, both located in the Santa Clarita Valley in the northern part of Los Angeles County, were named in his honor. A Santa Clarita baseball field complex is named in his honor.

The "Range Rider of the Yellowstone," a statue commissioned by Hart and modeled from life, stands on the Rimrocks in front of the airport at Billings, Montana. Hart donated it to the city in 1927, where it remains a memorial to his memory.

On November 10, 1962, Hart was honored posthumously in an episode of The Roy Rogers and Dale Evans Show, a short-lived western variety program on ABC.

== Published books ==
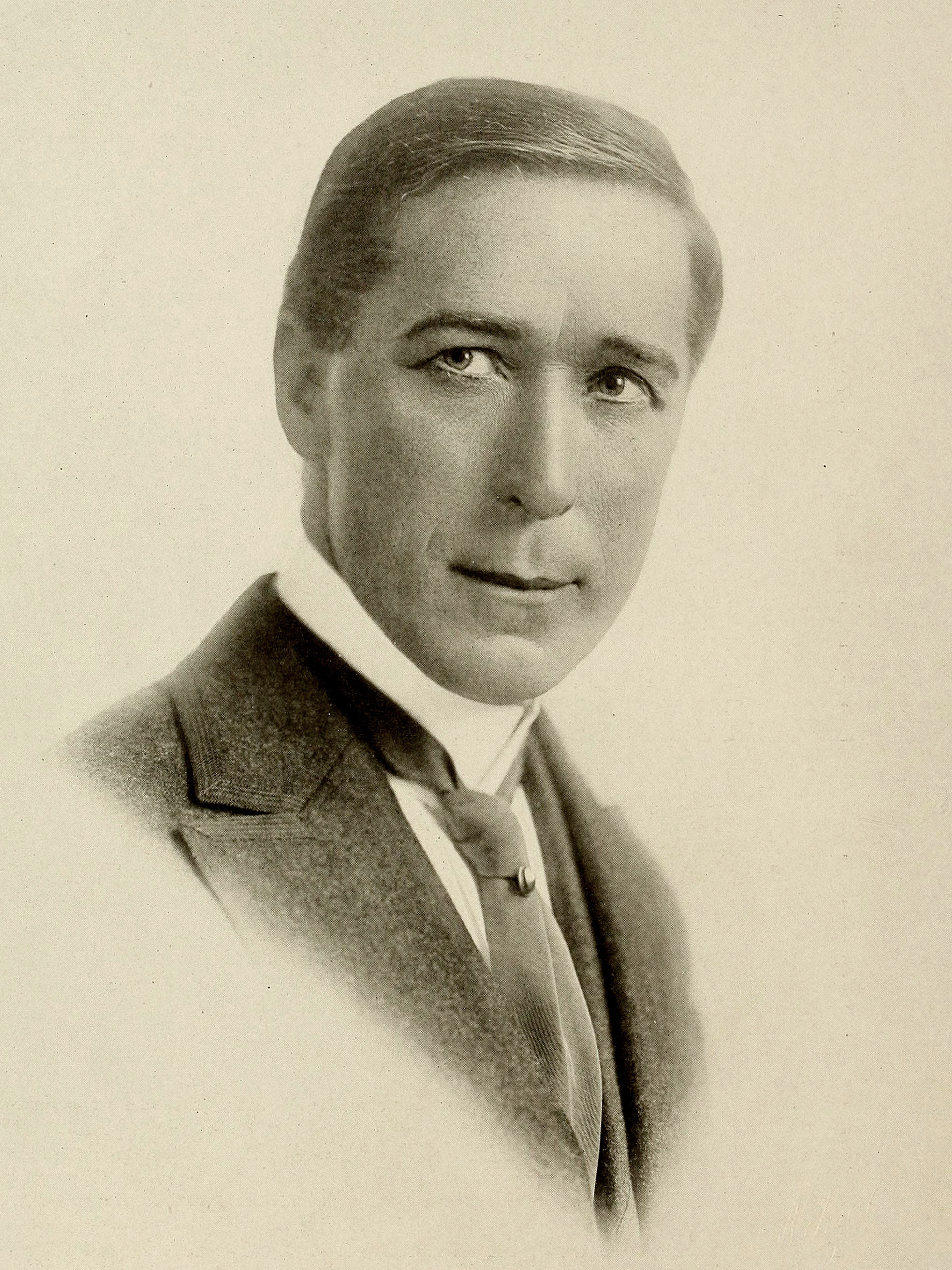
Portrait of Hart in the June 1916 issue of The Photo-Play Journal

After Hart retired from film making he began writing short stories and book-length manuscripts. His published books are:

- Pinto Ben and Other Stories (written with Mary Hart), 1919, Britton Publishing Company
- The Golden West Boys, Injun and Whitey, 1920, Grosset & Dunlap
- Injun and Whitey Strike Out for Themselves, 1921, Grosset & Dunlap
- Injun and Whitey to the Rescue, 1922, Grosset & Dunlap
- Told Under a White Oak Tree (credited as by "Bill Hart's Pinto Pony"), 1922, Houghton Mifflin Co.
- A Lighter of Flames, 1923, Thomas Y. Crowell
- The Order of Chanta Sutas, 1925, unknown publisher
- My Life East and West, 1929, Houghton Mifflin Co.
- Hoofbeats, 1933, Dial Press
- Law on Horseback and Other Stories, 1935, self-published
- And All Points West (written with Mary Hart), 1940, Lacotah Press

== William S. Hart Ranch and Museum ==
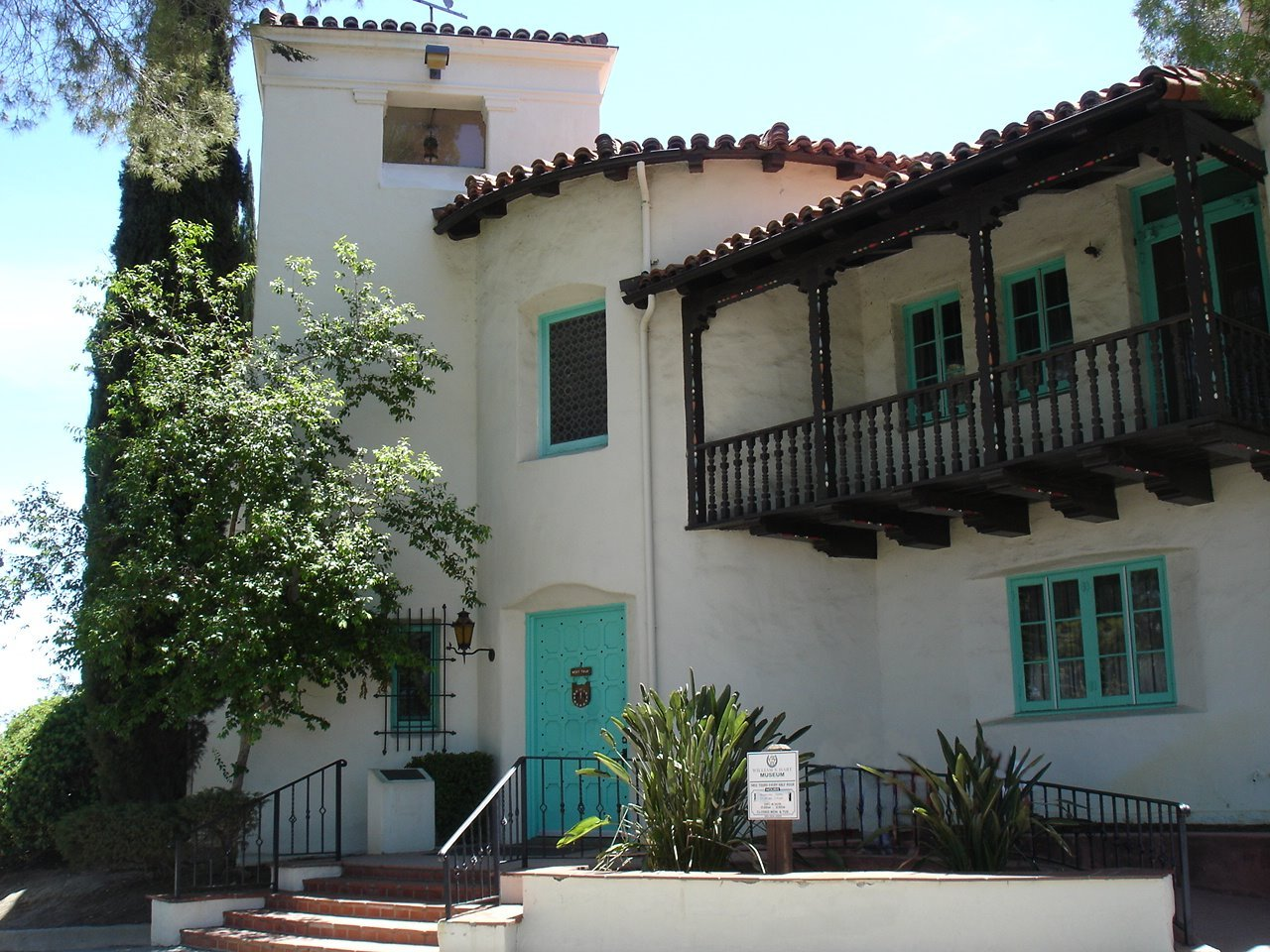
Hart's ranch home in Newhall, California, built between 1924 and 1928

When Hart died, he bequeathed his home to Los Angeles County so that it could be converted into a park and museum. Until 2023 his former home in Newhall, Santa Clarita, California, operated as a satellite of the Natural History Museums of Los Angeles County where it was free and open to the public. The home is a Spanish Colonial Revival style mansion and contains many of the movie star's possessions including Native American artifacts and works by artists Charles Marion Russell, James Montgomery Flagg, and Joe de Yong. The Museum is an important part of Hart's legacy as he said before he died: "When I was making pictures, the people gave me their nickels, dimes, and quarters. When I am gone, I want them to have my home." The surrounding 265-acre (107 ha) William S. Hart Park includes the mansion, trails, an animal area with farm animals, bison, and a picnic area. Hart Park and Museum is located at 24151 Newhall Avenue, Santa Clarita, CA 91321. Since 2015, the park has been home to the Santa Clarita Cowboy Festival and Annual Hart of the West Powwow. The former was previously held at Melody Ranch.
