= Sarah Crocker Conway =

American actress

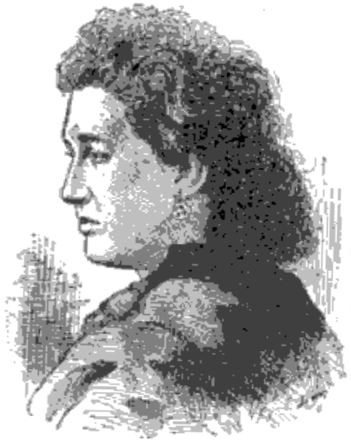
- Born: 1834; Ridgefield, Connecticut, U.S.
- Died: April 28, 1875 (aged 40–41); Brooklyn, New York, U.S.
- Occupation: Actress
- Spouse: Frederick B. Conway (m. 1852)
- Relatives: Elizabeth Crocker Bowers (sister), Conway Tearle (grandson), Godfrey Tearle (grandson)

Sarah Crocker Conway (1834–1875) was an American actress. She was a sister of Elizabeth Crocker Bowers, also an actress.

== Biography ==
Sarah Crocker was born in Ridgefield, Connecticut in 1834. She made her debut in Baltimore, Maryland, in 1849, playing Parthenia and other leading parts. In May 1852, she married the actor Frederick B. Conway, and the two thenceforward acted together. In 1859, they opened Pike's Opera House in Cincinnati, Ohio, with a first-class company, but the engagement was not profitable, and they returned to the east. In 1861, they visited England, and filled a short engagement at Sadler's Wells Theatre, London. After their return, they became star actors, and made an extensive and profitable tour. In 1864 Sarah leased the Park Theatre in Brooklyn, and subsequently the new Brooklyn Theatre, in which for nine years her husband played leading parts. Sarah Conway possessed a tall and graceful figure and an expressive countenance, and was a versatile actress and a popular theatre manager.

She was the mother of actress Marianne "Minnie" Conway (c. 1852-1896). Her grandsons, through Minnie, were actors Conway Tearle and Sir Godfrey Tearle.

Sara Conway died in her apartment at the Brooklyn Theatre on April 28, 1875.
