= Love's Masquerade (1922 film) =

1922 silent film

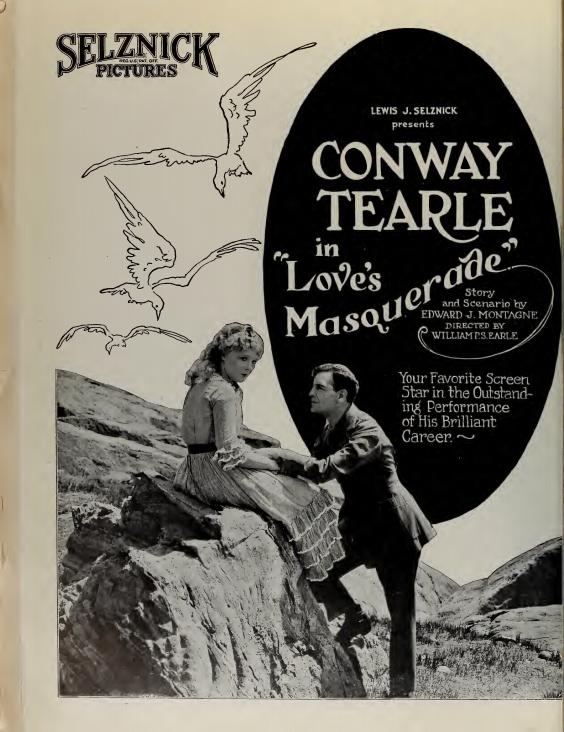
- Directed by: William P.S. Earle
- Written by: Edward J. Montagne
- Produced by: Lewis J. Selznick
- Starring: Conway Tearle; Winifred Westover; Florence Billings
- Cinematography: Jacob A. Badaracco
- Production company: Selznick Pictures
- Distributed by: Select Pictures
- Release date: March 20, 1922
- Running time: 50 minutes
- Country: United States
- Languages: Silent; English intertitles

Love's Masquerade is a 1922 American silent drama film directed by William P.S. Earle and starring Conway Tearle, Winifred Westover and Florence Billings.

== Cast ==
- Conway Tearle as Russell Carrington
- Winifred Westover as Dorothy Wheeler
- Florence Billings as Rita Norwood
- Robert Ellis as Herbert Norwooood
- Danny Hayes as 'Sly Sam'
- Arthur Housman as Newspaper Reporter
- Robert Schable as Ross Gunther

== Bibliography ==
- Munden, Kenneth White. The American Film Institute Catalog of Motion Pictures Produced in the United States, Part 1. University of California Press, 1997.
