= Godfrey Tearle =

British actor (1884–1953)

Sir Godfrey Tearle
- Born: Godfrey Seymour Tearle; 12 October 1884; New York City, U.S.
- Died: 9 June 1953 (aged 68); London, England
- Years active: 1923–1953
- Spouses: Mary Malone (m. 1909; div. 1932) Stella Freeman (m. 1932; died 1936) Barbara Palmer (m. 1937, divorced)
- Relatives: Conway Tearle (half-brother)

Sir Godfrey Seymour Tearle (12 October 1884 – 9 June 1953) was a British actor who portrayed the quintessential British gentleman on stage and in both British and US films.

== Biography ==
Born in New York City and brought up in Britain, he was the son of British actor/manager George Osmond Tearle (1852–1901) and American actress Marianne "Minnie" Conway (1852–1896), the brother of actor Malcolm Tearle, and the half-brother of silent film star Conway Tearle. His maternal grandmother was Sarah Crocker Conway.

In 1893, he made his stage debut as young Prince Richard, Duke of York, in his father's production of Richard III and in 1908 he appeared in his first film as Romeo in Romeo and Juliet. In 1910 he played Prince Olaf in The Prince and the Beggar Maid at the Lyceum Theatre in London. He became a Shakespearean actor of note, appearing on stage in the title roles of Othello, Macbeth and Henry V. His theatrical career was interrupted when he joined the Royal Artillery for a four-year stint beginning in 1915. In 1924 he starred in the West End production of Frederick Lonsdale's drama The Fake. In 1935 he appeared in Bernard Merivale's The Unguarded Hour.

One of Tearle's most memorable screen roles was in Alfred Hitchcock's The 39 Steps (1935), in which he portrayed Professor Jordan, a seemingly respectable country squire whose missing finger unmasks him as an enemy agent. He was cast as an RAF gunner in One of Our Aircraft Is Missing (1942), a German general in Undercover (film) (1943), an aging First World War veteran in Medal for the General (1944) and as Franklin D. Roosevelt in The Beginning or the End, MGM's 1946 account of the Manhattan Project.

Tearle made his Broadway theatre debut in Carnival in 1919. In his review in The New York Times, Alexander Woollcott noted, "It is difficult to guess why Godfrey Tearle should have selected as the vehicle of his American debut the play called Carnival, which was presented to New York for the first time last evening at the 44th Street Theatre. It is a spare and unsubstantial piece at best, and the role it offers him is distinctly secondary in importance and opportunity." Additional Broadway credits include The Fake (1924), The Flashing Stream (1939), and Antony and Cleopatra (1947). In 1952 he appeared on the West End in Raymond Massey's play Hanging Judge.

== Knighthood ==
Tearle was knighted in the 1951 King's Birthday Honours List for services to drama.

== Marriages ==
He was married three times, to actress Mary Malone from 1909 until their divorce in 1932, to starlet Stella Freeman from 1932 until her sudden death in 1936, and to Barbara Palmer from 1937 until their divorce in 1947.

For several years at the end of his life, Tearle lived with the actress Jill Bennett.

== Death ==
Sir Godfrey Tearle died on 9 June 1953, aged 68.

== Complete filmography ==
- Romeo and Juliet (1908 short) - Romeo
- The Fool (1913) - Sterndale
- Lochinvar (1915 short) - Lochinvar
- Sir James Mortimer's Wager (1915 short) - Sir James Mortimer
- The Real Thing at Last (1916 short) - Macduff
- The March Hare (1919) - Guy
- A Sinless Sinner (1919) - Tom Harvey
- Fancy Dress (1919) - Tony Broke
- Nobody's Child (1919) - Ernest d'Alvard
- Queen's Evidence (1919) - Adam Pascal
- Salome of the Tenements (1925) - John Manning
- Guy of Warwick (1926 short) - Guy of Warwick
- If Youth But Knew (1926) - Dr. Martin Summer
- One Colombo Night (1926) - Jim Farnell
- Infatuation (1930 short) - Gerald Norton
- These Charming People (1931) - James Berridge
- The Shadow Between (1931) - Paul Haddon
- Puppets of Fate (1933) - Richard Sabine
- Jade (1934 short) - The Man
- The 39 Steps (1935) - Professor Jordan
- The Last Journey (1936) - Sir Wilfred Rhodes
- East Meets West (1936) - Sir Henry Mallory
- Tomorrow We Live (1936) - Sir Charles Hendra
- One of Our Aircraft Is Missing (1942) - Sir George Corbett - Rear Gunner in B for Bertie
- Tomorrow We Live (1943) - Mayor Pierre Duchesne
- Undercover (1943) - Gen. Von Staengel
- The Lamp Still Burns (1943) - Sir Marshall Freyne
- Medal for the General (1944) - General Church
- The Rake's Progress (1945) - Colonel Robert Kenway
- The Beginning or the End (1947) - President Roosevelt
- Private Angelo (1949) - Count Piccologrando
- White Corridors (1951) - Mr. Groom Sr.
- I Believe in You (1952) - Mr. Pyke
- Mandy (1952) - Mr. Garland
- Decameron Nights (1953) - Ricciardo / Bernabo
- The Titfield Thunderbolt (1953) - The Bishop

== Sources ==
- Halliwell's Who's Who in the Movies - published by Harper-Collins - ISBN 0-06-093507-3
- Guide to Movies & Videos published by Dell - ISBN 0-440-21766-0
