= William A. Conway (actor) =

English actor

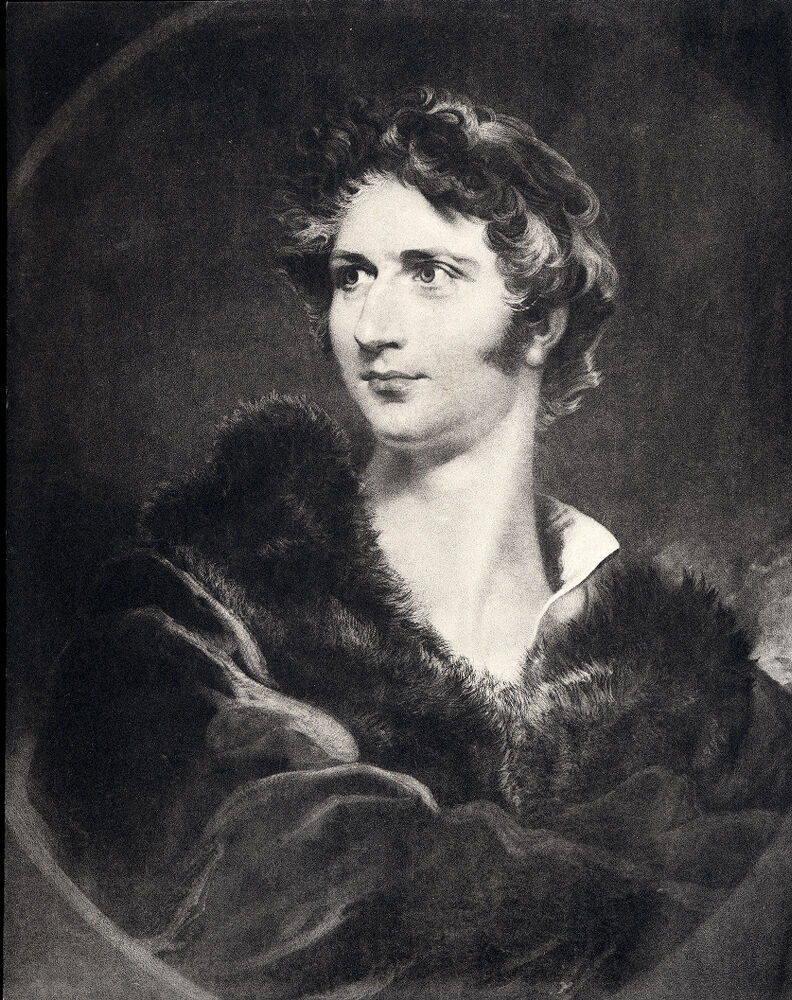
- portrait by George Henry Harlow
- Born: 1789; London
- Died: 1828; Charleston
- Occupation: Actor
- Children: Frederick B. Conway

William Augustus Conway (1789–1828) was an English actor.

== Career ==
Conway studied for the bar, but appeared on the stage at the Haymarket Theatre in London. He terminated a three year engagement in 1816, starred till 1821, and went to the United States in 1823. He appeared as Hamlet and in other tragic roles in New York City and Philadelphia. He visited western and southern cities, took passage early in 1828 for Savannah, Georgia, and threw himself into the sea off Charleston Bar while on the voyage.

Conway won the affections of Hester Piozzi, whose letters to him were published in 1843.. As Coriolanus he was considered to have been excelled by John Philip Kemble alone.

== Personal life ==
His son, Frederick B. Conway, was an actor.
