= The Lunatic at Large =

The Lunatic at Large may refer to:

- The Lunatic at Large (novel), an 1899 comedy novel by J. Storer Clouston
- The Lunatic at Large (1921 film), a British silent comedy film based on the novel
- The Lunatic at Large (1927 film), an American comedy film based on the novel
