= The Mystery of Number 47 =

1912 novel

- American first edition
- Author: J. Storer Clouston
- Original title: His First Offence
- Language: English
- Genre: Comedy mystery
- Publisher: Mills & Boon (UK); Moffat, Yard & Co. (US)
- Publication date: 1912
- Publication place: United Kingdom
- Media type: Print

The Mystery of Number 47 is a 1912 comedy mystery thriller novel by the British writer J. Storer Clouston. Living in a quiet suburb of London and writing detective novels under an assumed name, Irwin Molyneux is suddenly drawn into a real-life case when he is sought by Scotland Yard for the murder of his wife due to a series of misunderstandings. It was originally published in London by Mills & Boon under the title His First Offence.

== Adaptation ==
In 1917 it was adapted into an American silent film The Mystery of No. 47 directed by Otis B. Thayer and starring Ralph C. Herz and Casson Ferguson. In 1937 a French film Bizarre, Bizarre directed by Marcel Carné and starring Louis Jouvet, Françoise Rosay and Michel Simon.

== Bibliography ==
- Blakeway, Claire. Jacques Prévert: Popular French Theatre and Cinema. Fairleigh Dickinson University Press, 1990.
- Goble, Alan. The Complete Index to Literary Sources in Film. Walter de Gruyter, 1999.
- Royle, Trevor. Macmillan Companion to Scottish Literature. Macmillan, 1984.
