= Bunty Pulls the Strings =

1921 film

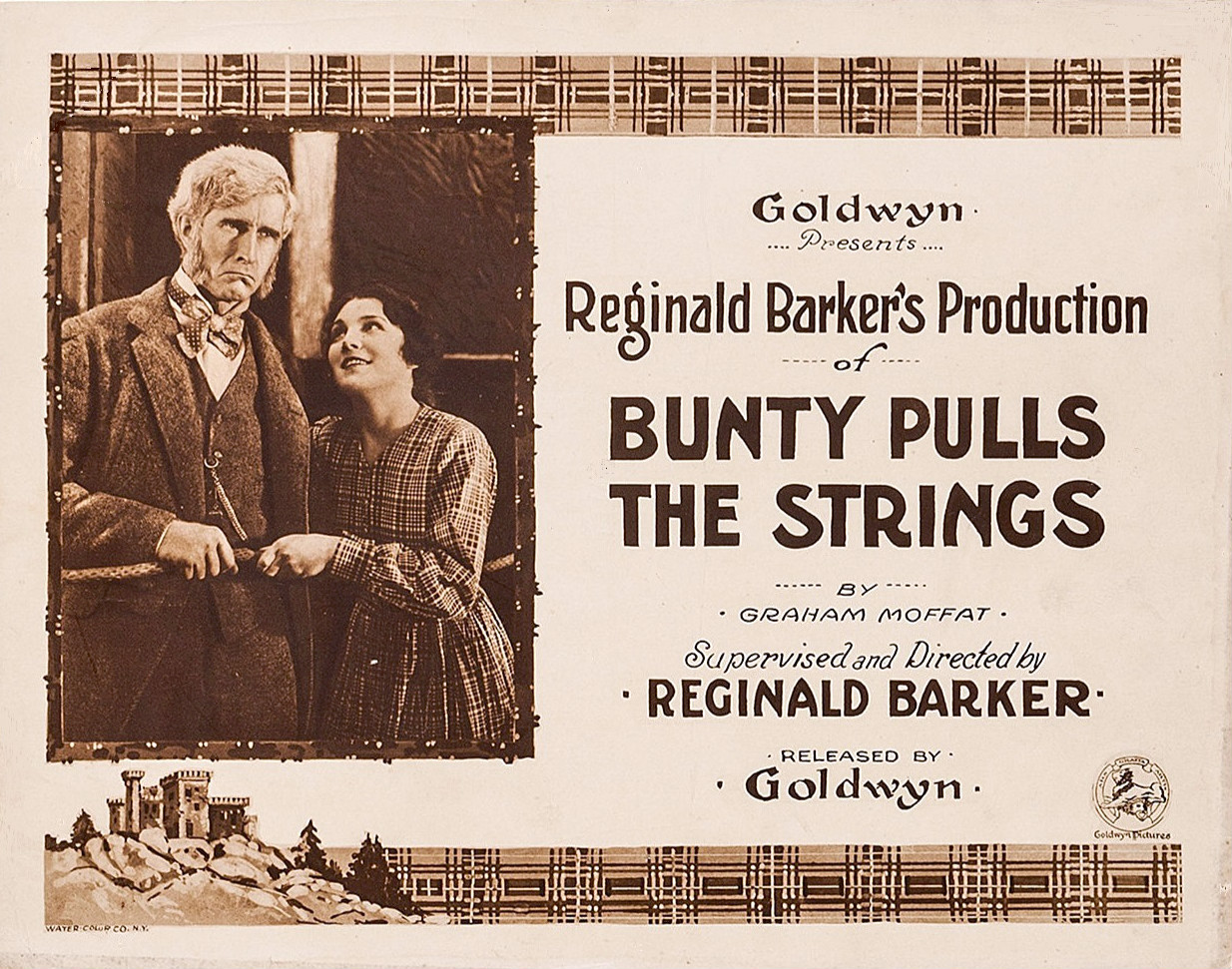
- lobby card
- Directed by: Reginald Barker
- Written by: J. G. Hawks; Charles Kenyon
- Based on: Bunty Pulls the Strings by Graham Moffat
- Produced by: Goldwyn Pictures
- Starring: Leatrice Joy
- Cinematography: Percy Hilburn (French)
- Distributed by: Goldwyn Pictures
- Release date: January 2, 1921
- Running time: 70 minutes
- Country: United States
- Language: Silent (English intertitles)

Bunty Pulls the Strings is a lost 1921 American silent comedy film directed by Reginald Barker and starring Leatrice Joy. It is based on the London and Broadway play by Graham Moffat. On stage the part of Bunty was played and made famous by Molly Pearson. The film was produced and distributed by Goldwyn Pictures.

== Plot ==
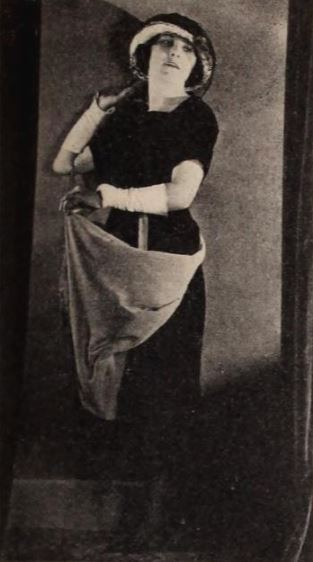
Leatrice Joy in the film

Bunty Biggar, sister of Rab and Jeemy, lives with her brothers and her father Tammas in a small Scottish village. One day, Jeemy confesses to having robbed a bank and asks his father to help him put the money back where it belongs. Tammas then takes the money entrusted to him by Susie Simpson, a spinster who has designs on him. But Susie, listening to a telephone conversation between Tammas and Eelen, an old friend of hers, discovers the man's embezzlement.

Susie now demands to get all her money back immediately. Having not returned it, Tammas is pilloried by Susie, who denounces the crime in the church in front of the whole community. Bunty intercedes for her father and returns the money lent to her by Weelum. The latter, in love with Bunty, takes her as his wife: the wedding is celebrated with a double ceremony, which also sees Tammas and Eelen in front of the altar.

== Production ==
The film is based on a stage play distinguished by the Scottish dialect throughout. In order to translate this to the silent medium, Goldwyn's vice president Abraham Lehr, told Exhibitors Herald, "Our big task in 'Bunty Pulls the Strings' was to retain consistent Scotch atmosphere throughout the entire picture. Our cast was either directly Scotch or of Scotch descent." This was a bit of a stretch: lead actress Joy was of Austrian and French descent on her father's side and of German and Irish descent on her mother's side. Lehr went on, "To retain fidelity to Scotch atmosphere we leased a ranch which abounded in highlands and lowlands, with a stream so situated as to enable our workmen to build streets on each side of it."

== Cast ==
- Leatrice Joy as Bunty
- Russell Simpson as Tammas Biggar
- Raymond Hatton as Weelum
- Cullen Landis as Rab
- Casson Ferguson as Jeemy
- Josephine Crowell as Susie Simpson
- Edythe Chapman as Eelen Dunlap
- Roland Rushton as Minister
- Georgia Woodthorpe as Mrs. Drummon
- Sadie Gordon as Maggie
- Otto Hoffman as Beadle
