= The Spy in Black =

1939 film by Michael Powell

The Spy in Black (U-Boat 29)
- U.S. film poster
- Directed by: Michael Powell
- Written by: Roland Pertwee (scenario); Emeric Pressburger (screenplay)
- Based on: The Spy in Black; 1917 novel by J. Storer Clouston
- Produced by: Alexander Korda; Irving Asher
- Starring: Conrad Veidt; Valerie Hobson; Sebastian Shaw
- Cinematography: Bernard Browne
- Edited by: Hugh Stewart
- Music by: Miklós Rózsa; Muir Mathieson
- Color process: Black and white
- Production company: London Film Productions
- Distributed by: Columbia Pictures
- Release date: 3 August 1939 (UK)
- Running time: 82 minutes
- Country: United Kingdom
- Language: English
- Budget: £47,300 or £46,882

The Spy in Black (US: U-boat 29) is a 1939 British spy film, and the first collaboration between the British filmmakers Michael Powell and Emeric Pressburger. They were brought together by Alexander Korda to make a First World War spy thriller novel, The Spy in Black by Joseph Storer Clouston, into a film. Powell and Pressburger eventually made over 20 films during the course of their partnership.

The Spy in Black stars Conrad Veidt, Valerie Hobson and Sebastian Shaw, with Marius Goring and Torin Thatcher as two German submarine officers. Grant Sutherland, a minister in Powell's The Edge of the World (1937), appears in this film as a Scottish air raid warden.

== Plot ==
In March 1917, Captain Hardt, a German U-boat commander in the First World War, is ordered to spy on the Grand Fleet at Scapa Flow, rendezvousing at the Old Man of Hoy. He sneaks ashore on the Orkney Islands to meet his contact, Fräulein Tiel. Tiel has taken the identity of a new local schoolteacher, Miss Anne Burnett, whom female German agents had intercepted and chloroformed en route to the island. Hardt finds himself attracted to her, but Tiel shows no interest. The Germans are aided by a disgraced Royal Navy officer, the former Commander Ashington who, according to Tiel, has agreed to aid the Germans after losing his command due to drunkenness; Tiel implies that she has slept with Ashington to obtain his cooperation.

The plan is almost disrupted when Burnett's fiancé, Rev. Harris, arrives unexpectedly but he is taken captive; an intrusive local minister and his wife are also deflected away.

Equipped with the crucial information he needs about the British fleet movements, Hardt rendezvous with his submarine to arrange for a fleet of U-boats to attack a sortie of two Royal Navy squadrons. Returning to the house and confident that all is going according to plan, Hardt makes a romantic overture to Tiel but she pulls rank and rebuffs him. She sneaks out of the house, believing she has locked Hardt in his room, but he leaves and secretly follows her, discovering that she has gone out to meet Ashington. Hardt overhears them talking and learns they are imposters, the British are aware of his presence and have turned his mission into a trap for the U-boats. Hardt's "contacts" are really British double agents – Ashington is Commander Blacklock RN and "Fräulein Tiel" is his wife, Jill.

As Jill prepares to leave the island, Blacklock returns to the house to arrest Hardt, only to find he has eluded them. Disguised in Rev. Harris's clothes, Hardt manages to board the island ferry, which is also carrying Jill, a number of civilian passengers, and eight German POWs. Blacklock reports Hardt's escape to the base commander, who explains that the British had learned of the Germans' plan when the real Anne Burnett briefly survived the German agents' attempt to kill her by throwing her off the cliffs into the sea.

At sea, Hardt manages to free the German prisoners and they seize the ferry. The Royal Navy pursue them, but before it can catch up the ferry is intercepted by Hardt's submarine and Hardt's first officer, Lieutenant Schuster, decides to shell it. As the U-boat surfaces and prepares to fire, Hardt realises it is his own submarine. He frantically attempts to signal it, but too late – the U-boat shells the ferry, which begins to sink. British ships then arrive and drop depth charges, destroying the fleeing U-boat. As Jill and the other passengers take to the life boats, Hardt realises all is lost and chooses to go down with the ship and join his crew.

== Cast ==
- Conrad Veidt as Capt. Hardt
- Sebastian Shaw as Lt. Ashington/Cmdr. David Blacklock
- Valerie Hobson as Fräulein Tiel (schoolmistress)/Jill Blacklock
- Esma Cannon as Maggie.
- Marius Goring as Lt. Felix Schuster
- June Duprez as Miss Anne Burnett
- Athole Stewart as Rev. Hector Matthews
- Agnes Lauchlan as Mrs. Matthews
- Helen Haye as Mrs. Sedley
- Cyril Raymond as Rev. John Harris
- George Summers as Capt. Walter Ratter (ferry captain)
- Hay Petrie as James, the Ferry Engineer
- Grant Sutherland as Bob Bratt
- Robert Rendel as Admiral
- Mary Morris as Edwards, the Chauffeuse
- Margaret Moffatt as Kate
- Kenneth Warrington as Cmdr. Denis
- Torin Thatcher as Submarine officer

== Production ==
The Spy in Black was filmed at Denham Studios, with location shooting at Northchurch Common in Berkhamsted, Hertfordshire and in Orkney, Scotland. The film wrapped production on 24 December 1938 and was released in the U.K. on 7 August 1939 – just weeks before the country again went to war with Germany. Its American premiere was held in New York City on 5 October of that year, and it went into general release two days later.

== Critical reception ==
The Monthly Film Bulletin wrote "This intricate story is gripping from beginning to end, and very skilfully directed"; Variety opined "Production is A1, as is the direction"; and The New York Times called it "the most exciting spy melodrama since the advent of the Second World War. The British may not have the Bremen, but they still have Conrad Veidt."

== Awards and honours ==
This film was named by the National Board of Review as one of the ten best films of 1939.
