= The Mystery of No. 47 =

1917 film

- Directed by: Otis B. Thayer
- Based on: The Mystery of Number 47 by J. Storer Clouston
- Starring: Ralph C. Herz; Nellie Hartley; Casson Ferguson
- Production company: Selig Polyscope Company
- Distributed by: K-E-S-E Service
- Release date: June 4, 1917
- Running time: 5 reels
- Country: United States
- Languages: Silent; English intertitles

The Mystery of No. 47 is a 1917 American silent comedy thriller film directed by Otis B. Thayer and starring Ralph C. Herz, Nellie Hartley and Casson Ferguson. It is an adaptation of the 1912 novel of the same title by British writer J. Storer Clouston.

== Synopsis ==
Irwin Molyneux hosts a dinner party for the Bishop of Bedford. However, when the cook unexpectedly disappears his wife steps in to prepare the dinner, and Molyneux pretends that his wife is away. This leads, through a series of misunderstandings, to Molyneux being sought by Scotland Yard for the murder of both his cook and wife.

== Cast ==
- Ralph C. Herz as Irwin Molyneux
- Nellie Hartley as Harriet
- Louiszita Valentine as Eva Wilson
- Edgar Murray Jr. as Lord Francis Phillamore
- James F. Fulton as Bishop of Bedford
- Frederick Eckhart as Inspector Bray
- Casson Ferguson as Buffington
- Margaret A. Wiggin as Aunt Margaret
- Lloyd Sedgwick as Fitzroy Jones
- Tony West as Cadbury
- May White as Jane

== Bibliography ==
- Connelly, Robert . Motion Picture Guide Silent Film 1910-1936. Cinebooks, 1988.
- Goble, Alan. The Complete Index to Literary Sources in Film. Walter de Gruyter, 1999.
