= Beastmark the Spy =

1941 novel

- First edition (UK)
- Author: J. Storer Clouston
- Language: English
- Genre: Spy thriller
- Publisher: William Blackwood and Sons
- Publication date: 1941
- Publication place: United Kingdom
- Media type: Print

Beastmark the Spy is a 1941 spy thriller novel by the British writer J. Storer Clouston. His final published novel, it was one of several notable thrillers he wrote along with The Spy in Black and The Man from the Clouds. It originally appeared as a serial in Blackwood's Magazine.

== Bibliography ==
- Burton, Alan. Historical Dictionary of British Spy Fiction. Rowman & Littlefield, 2016.
- Royle, Trevor. Macmillan Companion to Scottish Literature. Macmillan, 1984.
