= Spittal, Northumberland =

Village in Northumberland, England

Coordinates: 55.756°N 1.993°W

Spittal
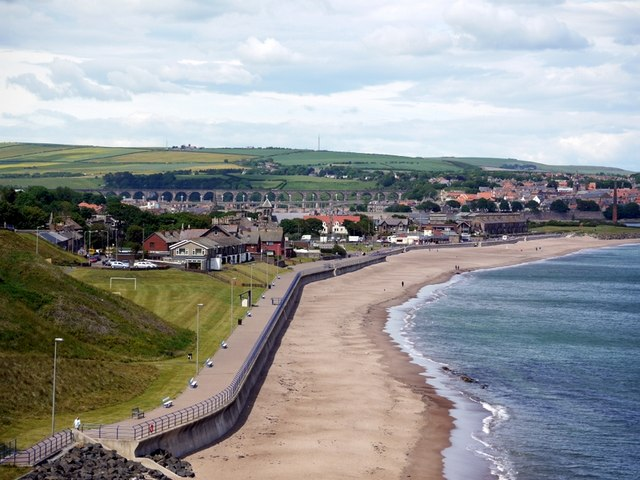

- Location within Northumberland
- OS grid reference: NU005515
- Unitary authority: Northumberland
- Ceremonial county: Northumberland
- Region: North East
- Country: England
- Sovereign state: United Kingdom
- Post town: BERWICK-UPON-TWEED
- Postcode district: TD15
- Dialling code: 01289
- Police: Northumbria
- Fire: Northumberland
- Ambulance: North East
- UK Parliament: North Northumberland

Spittal is a village in northern Northumberland, England. It is part of Berwick-upon-Tweed and is situated on the coast to the east of Tweedmouth. Spittal Beach is considered one of the best beaches in Northumberland.

The name derives from a shortened form of "hospital"; a hospital, dedicated to St Bartholomew, was built here in the Middle Ages to take care of lepers. St John's, the parish church, was built in 1867 in the Early English style, its tower being added in 1894. Prior to this, "Spittlers" had worshipped in a stable loft. There is also a nonconformist church, St Paul's, built in 1878. The village has several hotels and guest houses providing bed and breakfast, a village shop as well as a microbrewery.

== Governance ==
Spittal is in the parliamentary constituency of Berwick-upon-Tweed.

== People ==
Maggie Moffat was born here and she became a suffragette and film actor.
