= The Spy in Black (novel) =

1917 novel

- American first edition
- Author: J. Storer Clouston
- Language: English
- Genre: Spy thriller
- Publisher: William Blackwood and Sons (UK); George H. Doran (US)
- Publication date: 1917
- Publication place: United Kingdom
- Media type: Print
- OCLC: 16728405
- LC Class: PR6005.L845

The Spy in Black is a 1917 spy thriller novel by the British writer J. Storer Clouston. It takes place near Scapa Flow in Orkney during the First World War. It was one of several thrillers he wrote along with The Man from the Clouds and Beastmark the Spy.

== Synopsis ==
German U-boat officer Lieutenant Conrad Von Belke travels to Scotland as part of a plot to gain intelligence for an attack on the Royal Navy fleet as it leaves its anchor. He encounters a local minister and a British naval officer prepared to betray his country. Too late, Von Belke realises he has been part of an elaborate British deception operation to lure U-boats out to sink them.

== Film adaptation ==
In 1939 it was made into the British film of the same title directed by Michael Powell and starring Conrad Veidt, Valerie Hobson and Sebastian Shaw.

== Bibliography ==
- Burton, Alan. Historical Dictionary of British Spy Fiction. Rowman & Littlefield, 2016.
- Burton, Alan. Looking-Glass Wars: Spies on British Screens since 1960. Vernon Press, 2018.
- Goble, Alan. The Complete Index to Literary Sources in Film. Walter de Gruyter, 1999.
- Royle, Trevor. Macmillan Companion to Scottish Literature. Macmillan, 1984.
