= The Lunatic at Large Again =

1922 novel

- First edition (US)
- Author: J. Storer Clouston
- Language: English
- Genre: Comedy
- Publisher: Nash and Grayson (UK); E. P. Dutton (US)
- Publication date: 1922
- Publication place: United Kingdom
- Media type: Print
- Preceded by: The Lunatic at Large
- Followed by: The Lunatic Still at Large

The Lunatic at Large Again is a 1922 comedy novel the British writer J. Storer Clouston. It was the sequel to the 1899 novel The Lunatic at Large and enjoyed commercial success. It portrays the further adventures of Francis Beveridge, and like its predecessor relies on a Wodehousian style of humour. It was published in America by E.P. Dutton & Company. Elements from the story were used in the 1927 American silent film The Lunatic at Large.

== Bibliography ==
- Goble, Alan. The Complete Index to Literary Sources in Film. Walter de Gruyter, 1999.
- Royle, Trevor. Macmillan Companion to Scottish Literature. Macmillan, 1984.
