= A Virginia Courtship =

1921 film

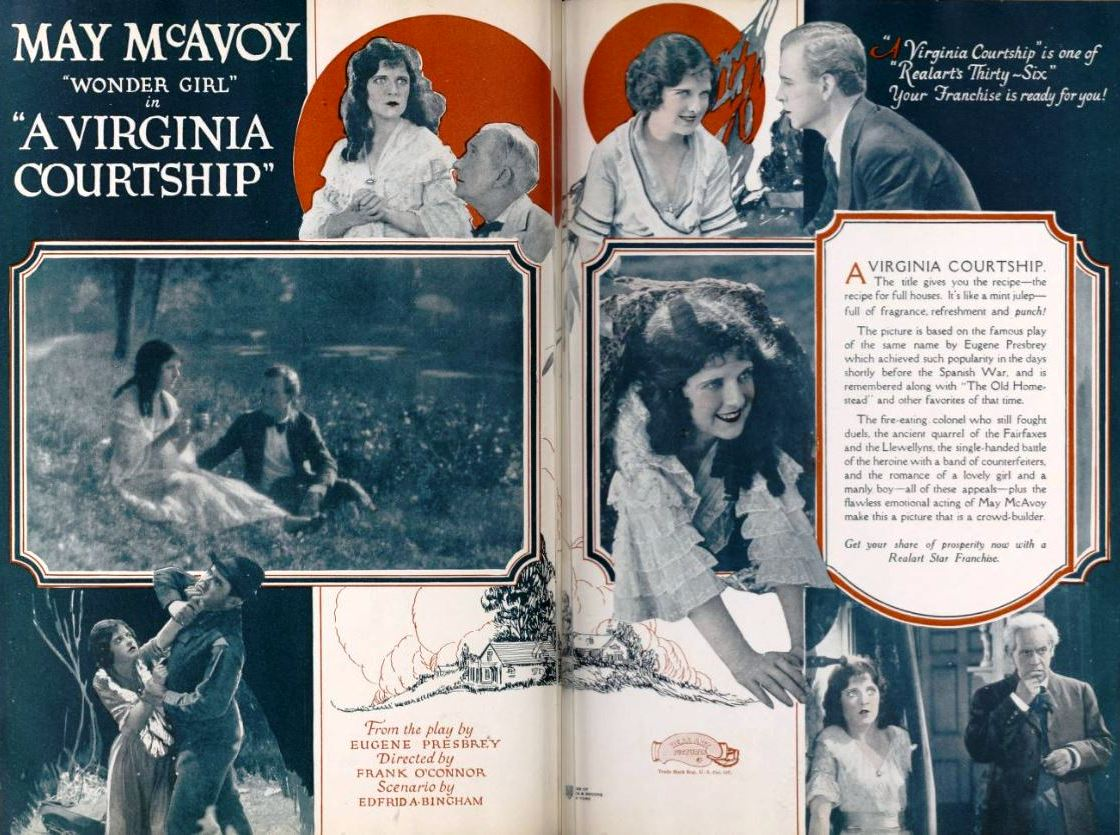
- Advertisement
- Directed by: Frank O'Connor
- Screenplay by: Edfrid A. Bingham
- Based on: A Virginia Courtship by Eugene Wiley Presbrey
- Starring: May McAvoy; Alec B. Francis; Jane Keckley; L. M. Wells; Casson Ferguson; Kathlyn Williams; Richard Tucker
- Cinematography: Harold Rosson
- Production company: Realart Pictures Corporation
- Distributed by: Paramount Pictures
- Release date: December 1921
- Running time: 50 minutes
- Country: United States
- Language: Silent (English intertitles)

A Virginia Courtship is a 1921 American silent drama film directed by Frank O'Connor and written by Edfrid A. Bingham based upon the play of the same name by Eugene Wiley Presbrey. The film stars May McAvoy, Alec B. Francis, Jane Keckley, L. M. Wells, Casson Ferguson, Kathlyn Williams, and Richard Tucker. The film was released in December 1921, by Paramount Pictures.

== Plot ==
As described in a film magazine, Prudence Fairfax is the ward of Colonel Fairfax, a lovable old Southern gentleman who has remained single because of a misunderstanding, some fifteen years previous, with his next door neighbor and childhood sweetheart Constance Llewellyn. While staging a chariot race she had seen on a poster, Pru is thrown from a runaway horse into a stream running through the Llewellyn estate and is rescued by Constance. They become fast friends. When the Fairfax Manor is about to be sold for a debt, Pru buys it through her broker Robin which almost precipitates a duel. However, a happy ending ensues when the old romance between the Colonel and Constance is renewed, and Pru marries the Colonel's nephew Tom instead of Dwight Neville, who is arrested for counterfeiting.

== Cast ==
- May McAvoy as Prudence Fairfax
- Alec B. Francis as Colonel Fairfax
- Jane Keckley as Betty Fairfax
- L. M. Wells as Squire Fenwick
- Casson Ferguson as Tom Fairfax
- Kathlyn Williams as Constance Llewellyn
- Richard Tucker as Dwight Neville
- Guy Oliver as Buck Lawton
- Verne Winter as Zeb
- George Reed as Sam
- Blue Washington

== Preservation status ==
The film is now lost.
