= Luke Laughs Last =

1916 film by Hal Roach

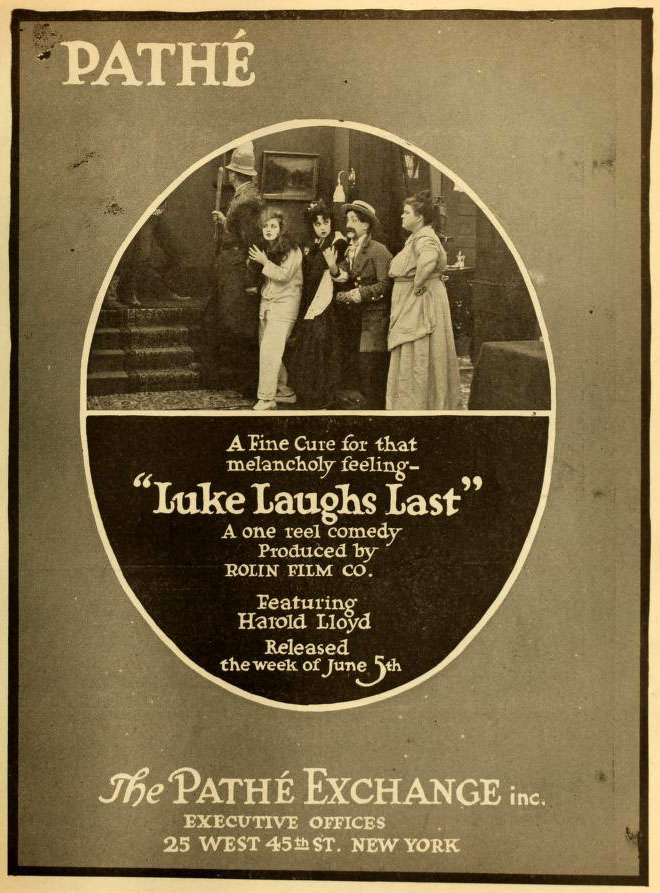
- Directed by: Hal Roach
- Produced by: Hal Roach
- Starring: Harold Lloyd
- Release date: June 5, 1916
- Country: United States
- Languages: Silent film English intertitles

Luke Laughs Last is a 1916 American short comedy film starring Harold Lloyd.

== Cast ==
- Harold Lloyd as Lonesome Luke
- Snub Pollard
- Bebe Daniels
- Sammy Brooks
- Bud Jamison
- Dee Lampton
- Charles Stevenson
- Harry Todd
- Blanche White
- May White

== See also ==
- Harold Lloyd filmography
