= Maggie Moffat =

British suffragette

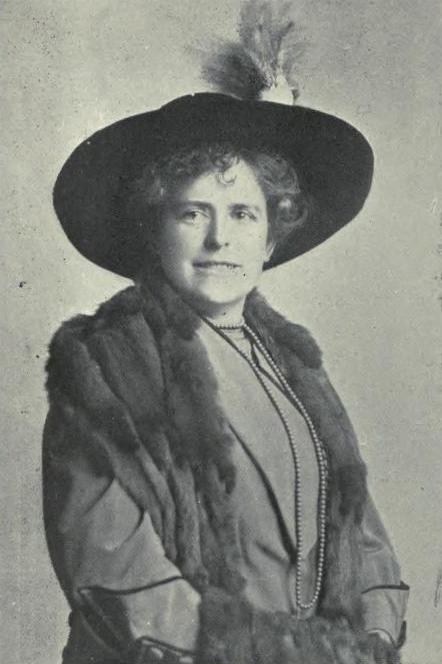
- Moffat in 1912
- Born: Margaret Liddell Linck; 7 January 1873; Spittal, Northumberland, England, United Kingdom of Great Britain and Ireland
- Died: 19 February 1943 (aged 70); Cape Town
- Other name: Margaret Moffat
- Occupation: Actor
- Known for: Women’s suffrage activism, actor
- Spouse: Graham Moffat
- Children: Winifred Moffat

Margaret Moffat born Margaret Liddell Linck (7 January 1873 – 19 February 1943) was a British actress and suffragette. She was amongst the first Scottish suffragettes to be arrested. She appeared in several films in the silent and sound eras.

== Life ==
Unlike many of her Scottish-born siblings, Moffatt was born in Spittal in northern England. She was the last but one of seven children born to Gottlob and Margaret Liddell (Dowie) Linck. Moffat had a talent for singing. After leaving school, she was a drapery salesperson before deciding to become an actress.

In 1907 she joined the Women's Social and Political Union and travelled to London as a Scottish delegate to the "Women's Parliament". She was amongst over 50 who were arrested in February 1907 after the suffragettes demonstrated at the House of Commons. She and Annie Fraser, the sister of suffragist Helen Fraser, were the first and second Scottish suffragettes to be arrested. Moffat and others were arrested and were given a fine. Moffat refused to pay and was sentenced to two weeks in Holloway Prison.

Her husband was subsequently interviewed in the family home (which was situated on Glasgow's University Avenue) by a reporter from the Daily Record. Mr Moffat expressed strong support for his wife, noting that she had gone to London at her own expense and that he would meet her on her release from prison and take her away on a trip.

Later that year, her husband Graham Moffat, who, like her, was also an active supporter of women’s suffrage and actor, founded an organisation for men who supported women's suffrage Northern Men's Federation for Women's Suffrage.

Moffat later joined the Women's Freedom League, and became treasurer of the Scottish council.

In 1914, she had her portrait painted by Cowan Dobson, which is in the National Galleries of Scotland collection.

Before emigrating, Moffat attended a reunion of suffragettes, which was in London and in the form of a party. Others in attendance were Ann Fraser, Edith New, Mary Phillips and Elsa Gye.

Moffatt and her husband emigrated to South Africa in 1933, and died in Cape Town in February 1943.

== Filmography ==
Year	Title	Role	Notes
1926	Till the Bells Ring	Jenny Struthers	
1933	Just Smith		
1935	Rolling Home	Mrs. McGregor	
1936	Keep Your Seats, Please	Mrs. O'Flaherty	Uncredited
1936	The End of the Road	Maggie	
1937	Farewell Again	Mrs. Billings	
1939	The Spy in Black	Kate	
