= Till the Bells Ring =

1926 Scottish talking film

- Graham and Maggie Moffat (pictured in a 1923 stage production of Till the Bells Ring)
- Written by: Graham Moffat
- Starring: Graham Moffat; Maggie Moffat; Winifred Moffat
- Production company: De Forest Phonofilm
- Release date: 11 October 1926
- Running time: c. 45 minutes
- Country: Scotland
- Language: Scots language

Till the Bells Ring is a Scottish early sound film, possibly the first feature-length talkie, which screened a year before the film commonly recognised as the first full-length talkie, The Jazz Singer. The film was based on a play in Scots by Scottish playwright Graham Moffat, and starred himself alongside his wife, suffragette Maggie Moffat, and their daughter, Winifred. It was filmed in 1926 in London, using the Phonofilm sound-on-film system, and has synchronised sound throughout and an approximately 45 minute running-time. The film was screened at a private showing in London in January 1926, and in October that year was the main feature at a week-long public release at Poole's Synod Hall in Edinburgh.

== Plot ==
According to the British Film Institute synopsis, the plot involves a widower courting a poor woman, mistakenly believing her to be wealthy.

The play was described as a domestic comedy, and was in Scots. The first words spoken in the film are, if the film follows the same script as the play, uttered by the character Aggie, played by Winifred Moffat:

Still anither mornin' and never a word or a sign o' him. Eh, me! The sun's gettin' through, so we'll be wearin' oor braws to the kirk the day.

This translates roughly to "Still another morning and never a word or a sign of him. Oh, me! The sun's coming out, so we'll be wearing our fine clothes to the church today."

== Cast ==
Maggie, Winifred, and Graham Moffat (c. 1915)
- Graham Moffat as John Snodgrass
- Maggie Moffat as Janet Struthers
- Winifred Moffat as Aggie Turnbull
- Bell Russell as beggar woman
- David Clyde as Samuel Dowie
- Laddie (the family sheep dog)

== Production ==
Till the Bells Ring used Lee de Forest's Phonofilm system, employing sound-on-film technology. The filming took place at the Forest Phonofilm studios in Clapham in December 1925, after Moffat approached the company with the idea. The costumes and set were provided by Moffat, and he paid the performers' salaries, while the recording equipment was supplied by the film company.

== Reception ==
Till the Bells Ring publicity (1926)

The 45-minute long film was shown privately on 28 January 1926 at the Holborn Empire in London, which was marred by technical problems with synchronising the sound. It then received a week-long public run at John R. Poole's Synod Hall in Edinburgh, beginning on 11 October 1926. Poole was a pioneer of cinema in Edinburgh, and had experimented with adding sound to the cinema experience, including showing a short Phonofilm to an audience of invited newspapermen the month before.

A review in The Scotsman commented that "the movement and sound are perfectly synchronised and after the listener becomes accustomed to the phenomenon of screen figures appearing to talk and the ear attunes itself to the sounds there is no difficulty in catching the spoken words."

Moffat is reported at the time as saying that he hoped Till the Bells Ring would help break the American monopoly on film, due to countries wanting "talking films" in their own languages or accents.

== 1933 onwards ==
Despite reviews in The Scotsman and the Edinburgh Evening News, the film does not appear to have been screened again, except when it was rereleased in 1933 as if it were a new film by a Mr A. L. Bayley. Reviews of it at that time were not favourable, noting the amateurish presentation and poor quality of the recording, although also commenting on the appeal of the characters and amusing dialogue. Graham Moffat sued Mr Bayley, alongside three other parties, for copyright infringement. Moffat won the case in 1935, upon which the judge, Fairfax Luxmoore, ordered the return to him of all negatives and copies of the film. After this, Till the Bells Ring fell into obscurity.

The BFI National Archives acquired three of the four reels of the film in 1975, from the collection of a Mr Holmes, but as of 2026 had never screened them. The reels were received unlabelled, and the location of the missing second reel is unknown; the reels held by the BFI amount to 2,450 ft, approximately 27 minutes. In October 2026, the BFI said that the film had undergone a condition report in 2024, and would now be assessed for preservation needs which "may result in research viewing material".

== Significance ==
Film researcher Marc David Jacobs identified the film as having been made and screened as a feature in 1926, a year earlier than the film commonly regarded as the first talkie, The Jazz Singer. At more than 40 minutes in length, and with synchronised dialogue throughout, Jacobs says that this makes Till the Bells Ring the first talking feature-length film. Jacobs attributes the film's obscurity to a lack of interest in early British film, its only screening having been in Scotland, and the misunderstanding of the creation date resulting from the 1933 copyright infringement case. He also asserts that when the film was first screened in London in 1926, press coverage was unenthusiastic as not only was the screening marred by technical problems with synchronising the sound, sound films in general were considered "little more than an interesting sideshow".

According to Bryony Dixon, curator of silent film at the BFI, the first claims that Till the Bells Ring was an earlier feature-length talkie than The Jazz Singer were made by John Poole, who was the owner of the Synod Hall where the film was publicly screened. Dixon says that Poole made the claims in 1931 in The Scotsman and again in 1936 in Fife News. Film historian Pamela Hutchinson said that determination of the film as the first feature-length sound film would depend on whether 45 minutes was regarded as feature-length, and whether it felt more like a film or a filmed stage play. Bryony Dixon said that while the film is "a filmed play rather than a multi-location, multi-scene edited drama", it has synchronised dialogue and may also have music.
