= Graham Moffat =

Scottish actor

- Portrait of Moffat
- Born: 21 February 1866; Glasgow, Scotland, United Kingdom of Great Britain and Ireland
- Died: 12 December 1951 (aged 85); Cape Town, Union of South Africa
- Known for: Men's League for Women's Suffrage and Bunty Pulls the Strings
- Spouse: Maggie Moffat

William Graham Moffat (21 February 1866 – 12 December 1951) was a Scottish actor, director, playwright and spiritualist. Moffat formed a Men's League for Women's Suffrage in Glasgow in 1907 after his wife Maggie Moffat was arrested at a protest in London and imprisoned for refusing to pay the fine. He is known for his 1910 comedy Bunty Pulls the Strings which was a hit on Broadway.

== Life and career ==
He was born on 21 February 1866 to William Moffat and Helen Dobson. The third of eight children, he was born in Glasgow, Scotland. There, he was exposed at an early age to the theatres and sixpenny galleries of the city and to numerous famous comedians and entertainers of the day.

He was married in 1897 to the stage actress and costume designer, Margaret Liddell Linck (1873–1943). His wife was also a suffragist, and in 1907 Graham Moffat founded the Men's League for Women's Suffrage in Glasgow. He also penned a suffrage propaganda play, The Maid and the Magistrate.

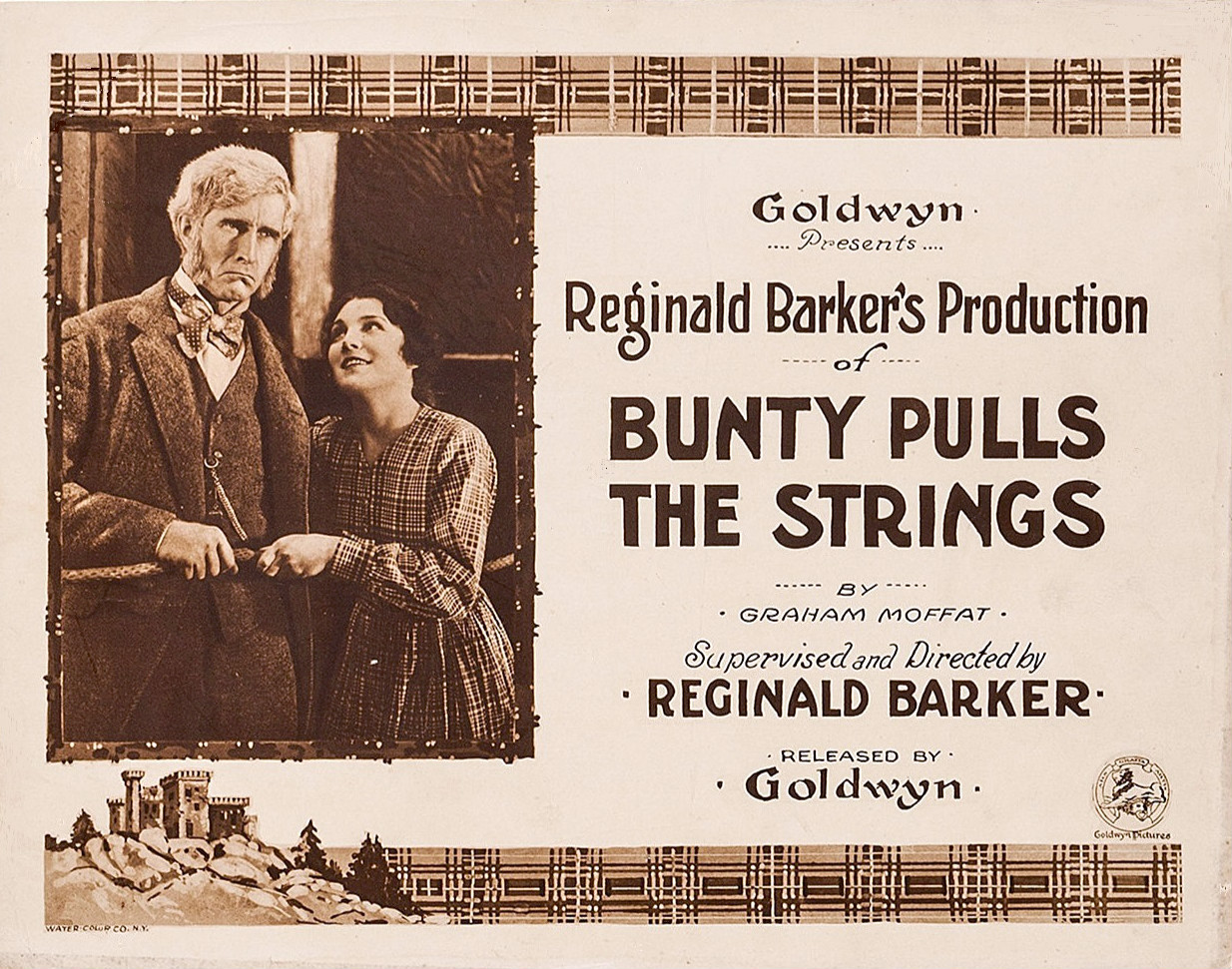
Bunty Pulls the Strings became a (now lost) film.

A few years later his comic play Bunty Pulls the Strings was a huge hit in London's West End, his biggest success, running for 617 shows at the Haymarket Theatre in 1911. In reviewing the play when it debuted on Broadway late in 1911, the New York Times classed Moffat beside J. M. Barrie and wrote, "it is the freshest and most wholesome thing that the theatres in New York have housed since the days of Peter Pan." The Scottish actress Molly Pearson played the title role of Bunty in New York. The comic actor James Finlayson played Bunty's father both New York and in London. Moffat toured Bunty Pulls the Strings in New Zealand in 1914. The play was made into a (now lost) film in 1921.

Moffat himself directed at least one film, Till the Bells Ring, a 46-minute experimental sound film based on the comedy of the same name he mounted in 1908. The film was screened in London and Edinburgh in 1926, and starred Moffat, his wife and his daughter, Winifred.

He retired to South Africa in 1936. By 1950, he was living in Cape Town, and he died there in 1951, aged 85.

Another of Moffat's works, Susie Tangles the Strings, was staged by the Edinburgh Gateway Company as their New Year play in 1956.

== Publications ==
Besides his plays, he published at least three books:

- The Pawky Scot (1928), a book of Scottish humour, with illustrations by Arthur Moreland.
- Towards Eternal Day: the Psychic Memoirs of a Playwright (1950) in which he revealed his belief that his dead father and brother helped from the dead in writing his plays. He also wrote on the supposed return from the dead of Sarah Bernhardt.
- Join Me in Remembering (posthumous, 1955) incomplete upon his death and finished by his daughter.
