= May White =

American actress

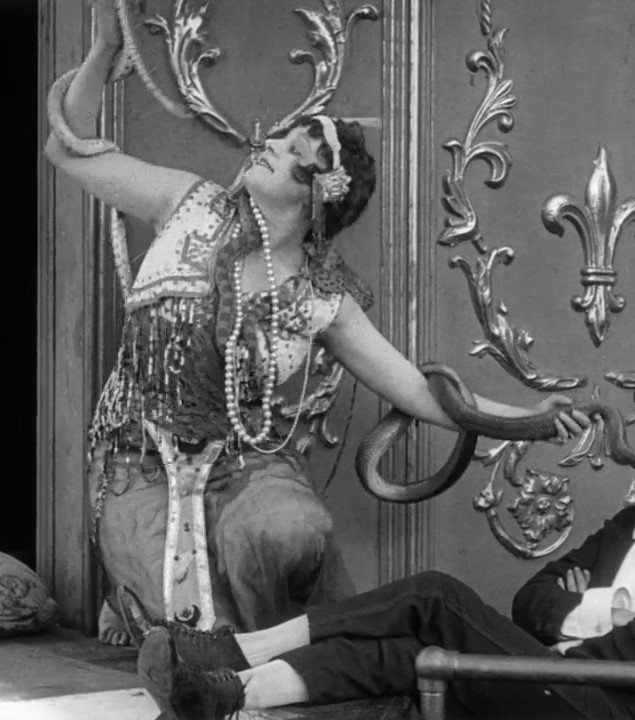
- White in 1915
- Born: c. 1889
- Died: October 18, 1979 (aged 89–90); Sarasota, Florida, USA
- Occupation: Actress
- Years active: 1915–1921

May White (c. 1889 – 18 October 1979) was an American silent film actress. She worked as an actress with Essanay Studios in Niles, California, before leaving with Charlie Chaplin for Los Angeles.

== Filmography ==
| Year | Title | Role | Notes |
|---|---|---|---|
| 1915 | A Countless Count | | short film |
| 1915 | A Night in the Show | Lady in Fountain / La Belle Wienerwurst | short film, uncredited |
| 1915 | Burlesque on Carmen | Frasquita | short film, uncredited |
| 1916 | The Beauty Hunters | The Cook | Short film |
| 1916 | Luke Laughs Last | | Short film |
| 1916 | Luke's Society Mixup | | Short film |
| 1916 | The Count | Large Lady | Short film, uncredited |
| 1917 | The Adventurer | Large Lady | Short film, uncredited |
| 1917 | The Mystery of No. 47 | Jane | |
| 1921 | The Kid | Edna's Maid | uncredited, final role |
