= The Canadian (film) =

1926 film

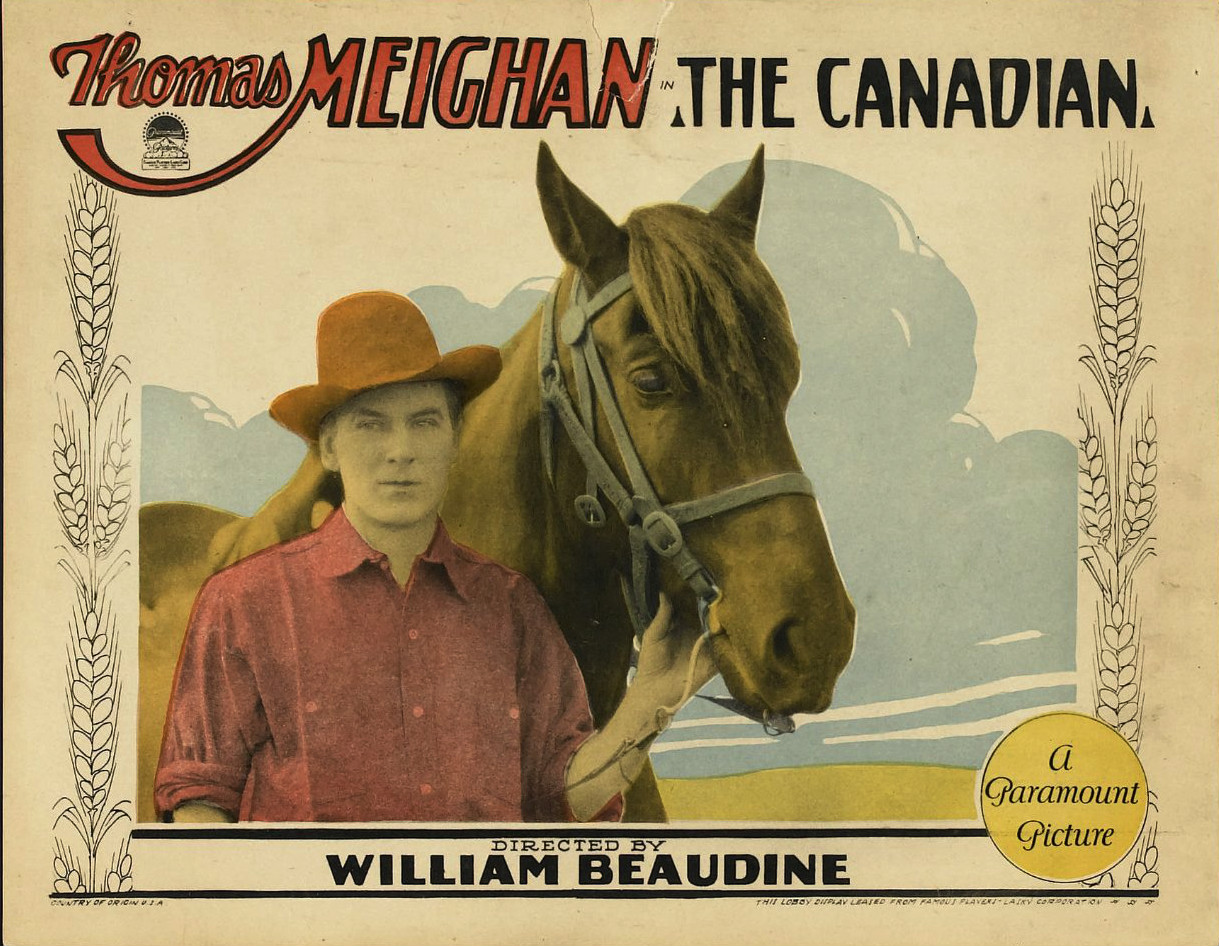
- Lobby card
- Directed by: William Beaudine
- Written by: Arthur Stringer (adaptation, scenario); Julian Johnson (intertitles)
- Based on: The Land of Promise by W. Somerset Maugham
- Produced by: Adolph Zukor; Jesse Lasky
- Starring: Thomas Meighan
- Cinematography: Alvin Wyckoff
- Distributed by: Paramount Pictures
- Release date: November 27, 1926
- Running time: 80 minutes; 8 reels (7,753 feet)
- Country: United States
- Language: Silent (English intertitles)

The Canadian is an extant 1926 American silent drama film produced by Famous Players–Lasky and distributed by Paramount Pictures. It is based on a 1913 Broadway play, The Land of Promise, by W. Somerset Maugham. The film was directed by William Beaudine and starred Thomas Meighan. Meighan had costarred with Billie Burke in a 1917 silent film based on the same story, The Land of Promise. In both films he plays the same part. This film is preserved in the Library of Congress.

== Plot ==
A couple undergo hardship homesteading in Alberta, where they are plagued by bad weather and financial woes.

== Cast ==
- Thomas Meighan as Frank Taylor
- Mona Palma as Nora
- Wyndham Standing as Ed Marsh
- Dale Fuller as Gertie
- Charles Winninger as Pop Tyson
- Billy Butts as Buck Golder
