= The Purple Lady =

1916 film directed by George A. Lessey

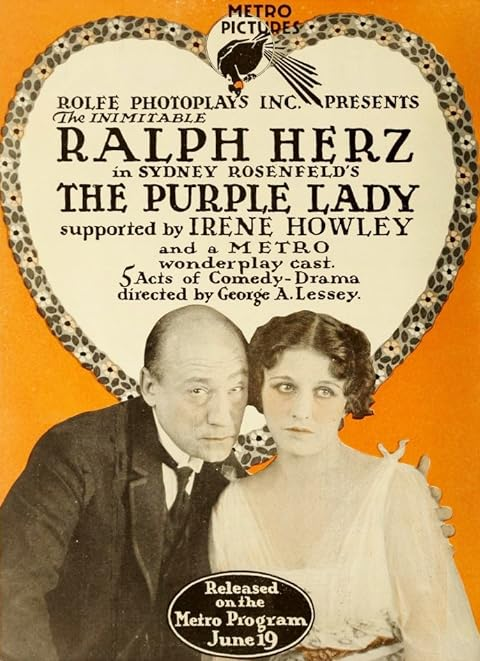
- Metro Pictures/Rolfe Photoplays lobby poster
- Directed by: George A. Lessey
- Written by: June Mathis
- Produced by: Sydney Rosenfeld
- Starring: Ralph C. Herz; Irene Howley; Alan Hale
- Cinematography: Arthur Martinelli
- Production company: Rolfe Photoplays
- Distributed by: Metro Pictures
- Release date: June 26, 1916 (US)
- Running time: 5 reels
- Country: United States
- Language: English

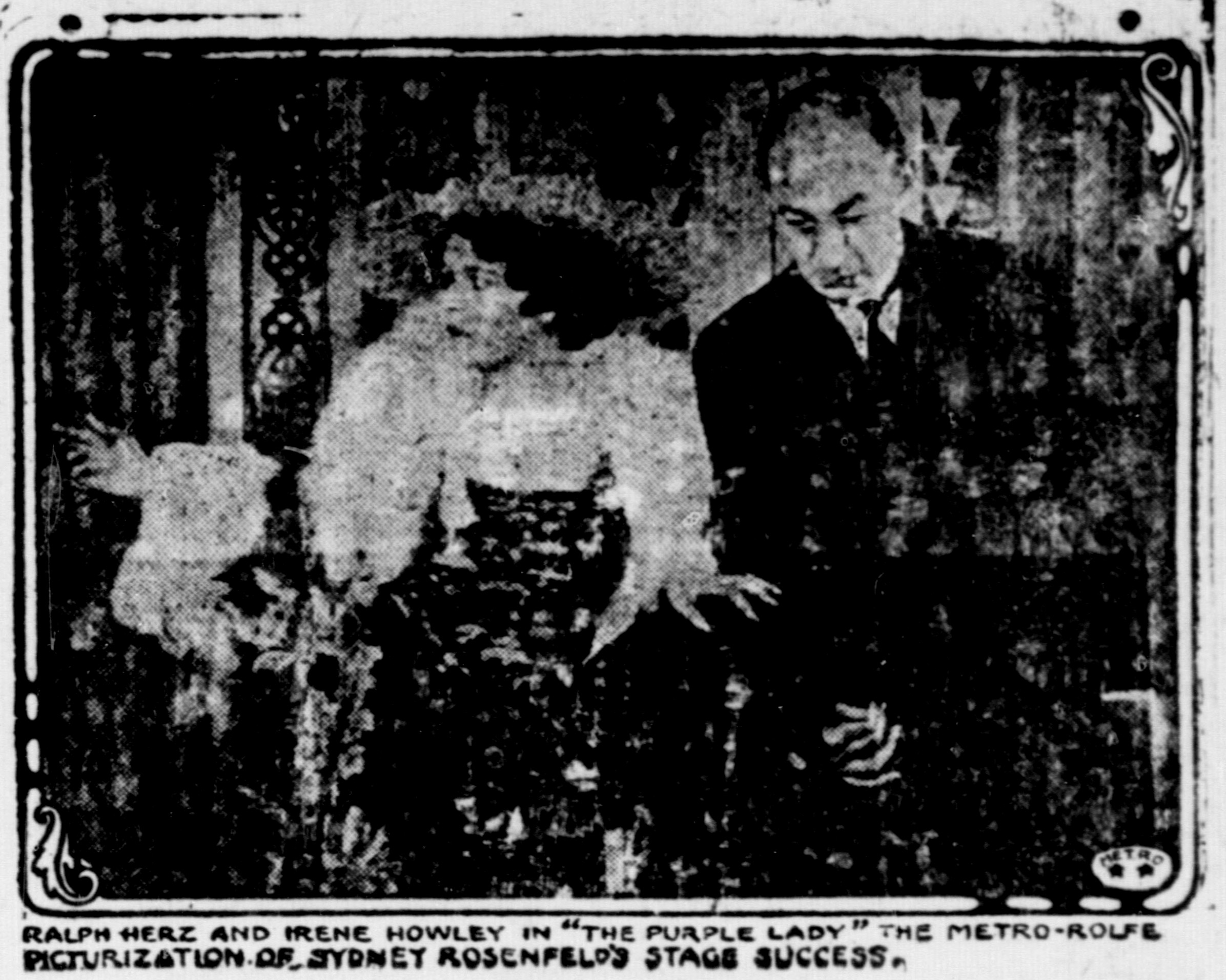
Publicity photo for the film.

The Purple Lady is a lost 1916 American silent comedy film. Directed by George A. Lessey, the film stars Ralph Herz, Irene Howley, and Alan Hale. It was released on June 26, 1916.

== Cast list ==
- Ralph C. Herz as Silas Gilworthy
- Irene Howley as Fifi Melotte
- Alan Hale as Count Louis Petelier
- Howard Truesdale as Mr. Severn
- George Pauncefote as Detective Rogers
- Guido Colucci as Jules Bergere
- Gretchen Hartman as Adelaide Severn
- Mrs. William Bechtel as Mrs. Severn
- Cora Williams as Mrs. Rogers
