= Borderland (1922 film) =

1922 film by Paul Powell

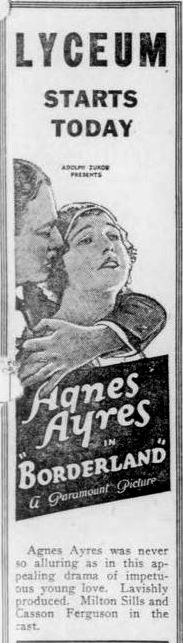
- Newspaper ad
- Directed by: Paul Powell
- Screenplay by: Beulah Marie Dix
- Produced by: Adolph Zukor
- Starring: Agnes Ayres; Milton Sills; Fred Huntley; Bertram Grassby; Casson Ferguson; Ruby Lafayette; Sylvia Ashton
- Cinematography: Harry Perry
- Production company: Famous Players–Lasky Corporation
- Distributed by: Paramount Pictures
- Release date: July 30, 1922
- Running time: 60 minutes
- Country: United States
- Language: Silent (English intertitles)

Borderland is a 1922 American silent drama film directed by Paul Powell and written by Beulah Marie Dix. The film stars Agnes Ayres, Milton Sills, Fred Huntley, Bertram Grassby, Casson Ferguson, Ruby Lafayette, and Sylvia Ashton. The film was released on July 20, 1922, by Paramount Pictures.

== Cast ==
- Agnes Ayres as Spirit / Dora Becket / Edith Wayne
- Milton Sills as James Wayne
- Fred Huntley as William Beckett
- Bertram Grassby as Francis Vincent
- Casson Ferguson as Clyde Meredith
- Ruby Lafayette as Eileen
- Sylvia Ashton as Mrs. Conlon
- Frankie Lee as Jimty
- Mary Jane Irving as Totty
- Dale Fuller as Elly

== Production ==
The working title of the film was Between the Worlds.

== Preservation ==
With no prints of Borderland located in any film archives, it is considered a lost film.
