= The Lunatic at Large (1927 film) =

1927 film by Fred C. Newmeyer

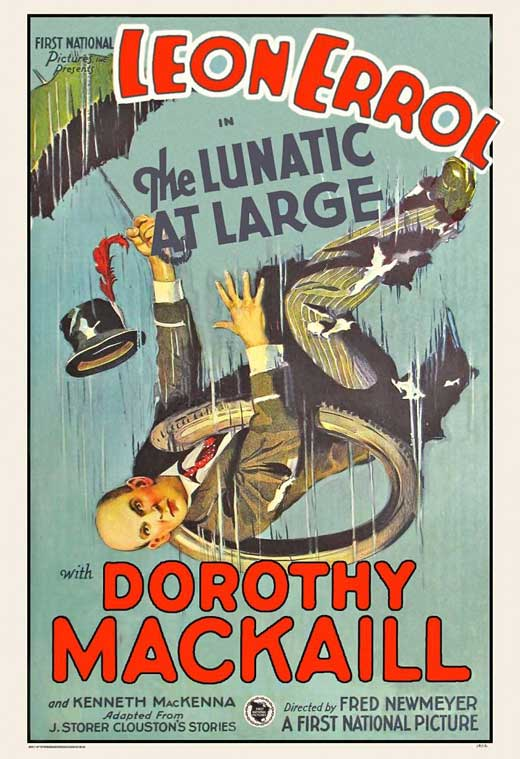
- Theatrical release poster
- Directed by: Fred C. Newmeyer
- Screenplay by: Ralph Spence
- Based on: The Lunatic at Large by J. Storer Clouston
- Starring: Leon Errol; Dorothy Mackaill; Warren Cook; Kenneth MacKenna
- Cinematography: L. William O'Connell
- Production company: First National Pictures
- Distributed by: First National Pictures
- Release date: January 2, 1927
- Running time: 60 minutes
- Country: United States
- Language: Silent (English intertitles)

The Lunatic at Large is a 1927 American comedy film directed by Fred C. Newmeyer and starring Leon Errol, Dorothy Mackaill and Warren Cook (his final role). Written by Ralph Spence, it is based on the 1899 novel The Lunatic at Large and its sequels The Lunatic at Large Again (1922), The Lunatic Still at Large (1923), and The Lunatic In Charge (1926) by British writer J. Storer Clouston, which had previously inspired a 1921 film of the same title. The film shifted the setting from the original's London to New York. The film was released on January 2, 1927, by First National Pictures.

== Cast ==
- Leon Errol as Sam Smith
- Dorothy Mackaill as Beatrix Staynes
- Jack Raymond as Mandell Essington
- Warren Cook as Dr. Wilkins
- Kenneth MacKenna as William Carroll / Henry Carroll
- Tom Blake as Maxwell
- Charles Slattery as Lunt
- Teresa Maxwell-Conover as Aunt Teddy

== Bibliography ==
- Goble, Alan. The Complete Index to Literary Sources in Film. Walter de Gruyter, 1999.
