= The Speeding Venus =

1926 film directed by Robert Thornby

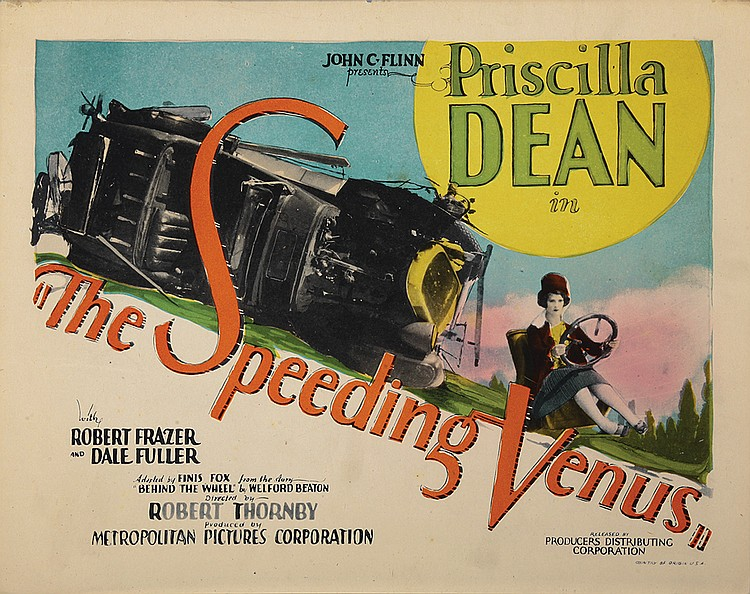
- Directed by: Robert Thornby
- Written by: Welford Beaton (story); Finis Fox
- Starring: Priscilla Dean; Robert Frazer; Dale Fuller
- Cinematography: Georges Benoît
- Production company: Metropolitan Pictures Corporation of California
- Distributed by: Producers Distributing Corporation
- Release date: September 13, 1926
- Running time: 60 minutes
- Country: United States
- Languages: Silent; English intertitles

The Speeding Venus is a 1926 American silent drama film directed by Robert Thornby and starring Priscilla Dean, Robert Frazer, and Dale Fuller.

== Cast ==
- Priscilla Dean as Emily Dale
- Robert Frazer as John Steele
- Dale Fuller as Midge Rooney
- Johnny Fox as Speck O'Donnell
- Ray Ripley as Chet Higgins
- Charles Sellon as Jed Morgan

== Bibliography ==
- Munden, Kenneth White. The American Film Institute Catalog of Motion Pictures Produced in the United States, Part 1. University of California Press, 1997.
