= Bizarre, Bizarre =

1937 film by Marcel Carné

- DVD cover
- French: Drôle de drame
- Directed by: Marcel Carné
- Screenplay by: Jacques Prévert
- Based on: His First Offence by J. Storer Clouston
- Produced by: Edouard Corniglion-Molinier
- Starring: Louis Jouvet; Françoise Rosay; Michel Simon
- Cinematography: Eugen Schüfftan
- Edited by: Marthe Poncin
- Music by: Maurice Jaubert
- Distributed by: Pathé Consortium Cinéma
- Release date: 20 October 1937
- Running time: 94 minutes
- Country: France
- Language: French

Bizarre, Bizarre (French: Drôle de drame) is a 1937 French comedy film directed by Marcel Carné. It is based on the 1912 novel His First Offence by J. Storer Clouston.

== Plot ==
At a meeting in London, Bishop Soper denounces scandalous literature, in particular the latest crime novel from Felix Chapel. An invited member of the sparse audience is his cousin Irwin Molyneux, who is asked to speak but is interrupted by William Kramps, a serial murderer of butchers who is on the run. After the meeting ends in uproar, Soper invites himself to dine and sleep at the Molyneux house.

This throws Mrs Molyneux into confusion, as her servants have just left her and she, pretending to be called away, cooks the meal while the secretary Eva serves it. Soper finds Molyneux's feeble excuses for his wife's absence bizarre and, once he has gone to bed, Mr and Mrs Molyneux flee to a boarding house in Chinatown, unaware that the next room houses William Kramps. In the morning, finding both now gone, Soper rings Scotland Yard.

All London is intrigued by the mystery and a newspaper hires the noted crime writer, Felix Chapel, to investigate. This is Mr Molyneux in a false beard, but he has no idea how to construct a mystery because his plots all come from Eva. She in turn confesses that she is equally clueless, since she gets them from the milkman Billy, who is in love with her.

While he is in his own house searching for clues to his wife's disappearance, back in Chinatown she has caught the attention of William Kramps, who woos her with flowers and flattery. When Molyneux arrives and reveals to Kramps that he is the writer Felix Chapel, while the lady is the missing Mrs Molyneux, the two men get happily drunk together and go back to the Molyneux house.

There they find Soper disguised as a kilted Scottish soldier, trying to recover an incriminating signed photo of a showgirl that he fears he left there, and a sleeping police detective. An angry crowd has gathered outside, wanting to hang the bishop for the murder of Mrs Molyneux. She slips in through the garden, to find William Kramps sleeping off his binge naked beside the pond. Going inside, her husband advises her to hide in a closet for safety. The sleeping detective, who also was drunk, wakes up to say that the body was revealed to him in a dream and, opening the closet, finds Mrs Molyneux.

William Kramps comes in to say he has killed Mr Molyneux and is arrested, but assures Mrs Molyneux he will escape. Mr Molyneux decides to stay as Felix Chapel, because it is better paid and more fun.

== Cast ==
- Michel Simon as Irwin Molyneux, botany professor, alias Félix Chapel, crime writer
- Françoise Rosay as Margaret Molyneux, his wife
- Louis Jouvet as Archibald Soper, bishop of Bedford, his cousin
- Nadine Vogel as Eva, his secretary
- Jean-Pierre Aumont as Billy, the milkman in love with Eva
- Jean-Louis Barrault as William Kramps, the murderer of butchers
- Pierre Alcover as Inspector Bray of Scotland Yard
- Henri Guisol as Buffington, the journalist
- Agnès Capri as street singer
- René Génin as sweeper
- Marcel Duhamel as partygoer
- Jeanne Loury as aunt Mac Phearson
- Madeleine Suffel as Victory
- Jenny Burnay as Mrs Pencil
- Annie Cariel as Mrs Soper
- Ky Duyen as Chinese hotel owner
- Jean Sinoël as prison warden
- Yves Deniaud as policeman (uncredited)
- Fabien Loris as policeman (uncredited)
- Frédéric O'Brady as policeman (uncredited)
- Max Morise as James, the valet
- Pierre Prévert as newspaper vendor (uncredited)
- Guy Decomble as pimp (uncredited)
- Foun-Sen as Chinese woman (uncredited)
- Jean Marais as drunken man who gets mugged (uncredited)
