= The Unknown Wife =

1921 film

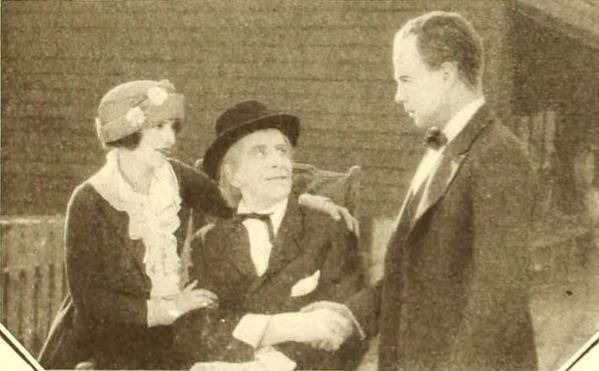
- Directed by: William Worthington
- Written by: Bennett Cohen; Wallace Clifton
- Starring: Edith Roberts; Spottiswoode Aitken; Casson Ferguson
- Cinematography: William M. Edmond
- Production company: Universal Pictures
- Distributed by: Universal Pictures
- Release date: March 14, 1921
- Running time: 50 minutes
- Country: United States
- Languages: Silent; English intertitles

The Unknown Wife is a 1921 American silent drama film directed by William Worthington and starring Edith Roberts, Spottiswoode Aitken and Casson Ferguson. It is also known by the alternative title of Three at the Table.

== Cast ==
- Edith Roberts as Helen Wilburton
- Spottiswoode Aitken as Henry Wilburton
- Casson Ferguson as Donald Grant
- Joe Quinn as 'Lefty' Mayes
- Joe Neary as 'Slim' Curry
- Augustus Phillips as John Mayberry
- Bertram Frank as Thomas Gregory
- Mathilde Brundage as Mrs. Stanwood Kent
- Jessie Pratt as Mrs. Dalton
- Edith Stayart as Doris Dalton
- Hal Wilson as Brooks

== Bibliography ==
- Connelly, Robert B. The Silents: Silent Feature Films, 1910-36, Volume 40, Issue 2. December Press, 1998.
- Munden, Kenneth White. The American Film Institute Catalog of Motion Pictures Produced in the United States, Part 1. University of California Press, 1997.
