= Helen Fraser (feminist) =

Scottish suffragist and politician (1881–1979)

- Born: Helen Miller Fraser; 14 September 1881; Leeds, Yorkshire, England, United Kingdom of Great Britain and Ireland
- Died: 2 December 1979 (aged 98)
- Occupations: Politician, suffragist, and activist
- Spouse: James Moyes

Helen Miller Fraser, later Moyes (14 September 1881 – 2 December 1979), was a Scottish suffragist, feminist, educationalist and Liberal Party politician who later emigrated to Australia.

== Background ==
Fraser was born in Leeds, Yorkshire to Scottish parents, James Fraser (1856–1908) and Christina Sutherland. She was one of ten children. Her father began work as a tailor's cutter, moving from Caithness to Edinburgh to Leeds, before finally settling in Glasgow when Helen was a child. There, he opened a wholesale clothing firm. She was educated at Queen's Park Higher Grade School, Glasgow. She opened a studio in Glasgow that specialised in black and white illustration work, embroidery and painting. In June 1908, Votes for Women, the newspaper of the Women's Social and Political Union reported that she had given up her art work to become an organiser for them. She was also an honorary treasurer of the Glasgow branch.

Her family was progressive politically, believing that conditions for workers should be improved. As a middle class young woman in Glasgow, her life involved dances and balls, theatre, raising money for charity, playing tennis, and visiting poor families in the city.

== Political career in suffrage movement ==
She joined the Women's Social and Political Union (WSPU) after hearing Teresa Billington speak in Glasgow. She travelled to England to help the WSPU campaign at the 1906 Huddersfield by-election. She became Treasurer of the Glasgow WSPU and a WSPU Scottish Organiser, one of the fifty-eight funded branches in the UK. On 20 December 1906, with Flora Drummond, Fraser and three others attempted to enter the Stranger's Lobby in the Parliament, and after a skirmish Drummond was arrested.

Although suffragettes tended towards more direct action, and law-abiding suffragists preferred more legal, democratic means, they both took the opportunity of national and local elections to raise awareness of the cause of votes for women. They supported candidates who wanted to extend the franchise, and spoke against candidates who did not support it.

In 1907, Fraser organised the WSPU campaign, using press publicity handbills about the experiences of the demonstrators, which read: 'CRUSHED BY THE MOUNTED POLICE AGAINST THE RAILINGS OF THE ABBEY, AND TRAMPLED UNDER THEIR HORSES HOOFS'. Fraser had the help of Mary Phillips in East Fife and during the 1907 Aberdeen South by-election she met Adela Pankhurst with whom she remained close friends throughout her life.

Her sister Annie, along with Maggie Moffatt, became one of the first Scottish suffragettes to be arrested.

During that early period, when suffragette tactics consisted of trying to reach the House of Commons, and in the first arrests when speaking in the lobby, my sister Anne was the first Scotswoman arrested. She had gone to London a day or two before. Called by my father to come downstairs, I found him with the Glasgow Herald open before him with a banner headline in the centre page: “Glasgow Councillor’s daughter arrested”. He said, “did you know about this.” I replied, “I knew she was going to a meeting but I did not know anything else. He looked at me under his brows in the way we regarded as serious and I oozed out of the room. He came home in the evening quite reconciled to it, and when Anne came home after fourteen cold days in Holloway Prison he took her to a municipal reception saying to her, “Put on your prettiest dress and come with me.” She looked charming and he introduced her all round as “My prisoner daughter”.

— Helen Fraser, Moyes, H (1971) A Woman in a Man’s World

In 1907, Janie Allan, being inspired by Fraser and Theresa Billington-Greig speaking about suffragette activity and organised a large WSPU meeting in St. Andrew's Hall, Glasgow.

Fraser took a prominent role in the WSPU's 1907 Hexham by-election campaign; for which by the Daily Mail praised her. She worked with Rachel Barrett, Elsa Gye and Mary Gawthorpe during the Dundee by-election the next year. During the Montrose burghs by-election in April 1908, as organising secretary for the WSPU, she was "heckled at considerable length". In 1908, Fraser attended the 'monster meeting' Women's Sunday and wrote to Isabel Seymour that it was 'successful but not entirely satisfactory'. Fraser estimated half a million people attended (a number supported by The Times estimates) but said that at three of the speaker platforms 'there was much rowdyism' and said 'it seemed to me that the mass of people were simply curious – not opposed- simply indifferent.

Fraser was also becoming disillusioned with the violent militant tactics of the WSPU. She criticised the actions of one WSPU member who broke the windows of Prime Minister H. H. Asquith. She resigned from the WSPU soon afterwards, and was approached by the National Union of Women's Suffrage Societies (NUWSS) and agreed to work for them. She was a member of the NUWSS national executive committee for fourteen years.

Fraser was effective as a public speaker and had speaking engagements not just in Scotland, but all around the UK. In a one-year period (1908–09), her meetings collected a total of £56.19.10 for the NUWSS. She spoke at the Aberdeen University Women's Suffrage Association, with Mary Gawthorpe, on the campaign to oppose Liberal candidates due to the government opposition to women's franchise, when a group of male students disrupted the event. Her action in moving a vote of no confidence in the Government at a public meeting where Mr Haldane was speaking in Rutherglan in 1908 led to her being ejected from the hall. Dr Marion Gilchrist joined Fraser in opening a suffrage campaign in the Christian Institute in Glasgow in the same year, and at a meeting in Motherwell also in 1908 Fraser spoke alongside Mrs Pankhurst and Mrs Pethick Lawrence.

In 1909, she conducted what the 'Dundee Courier' described as the 'longest continuous tour ever undertaken in Scotland to propagate women's suffrage', The article lists twenty-one different towns that were only part of the tour. Bridgend in Wales saw Fraser contrast the anomalies in men's votes being amended by Parliament whereas what she described as 'the greatest anomaly there was, was the injustice of excluding women from all rights of citizenship because they were women'

Chrystal MacMillan, Dr Elsie Inglis were just two of those who supported Fraser at the 1911 Glasgow (Tradeston) By-election in an event organised by the Glasgow and West of Scotland Association for Women's Suffrage.

In 1912, she spoke at a meeting in Cambridge organised by the Cambridge Women's Suffrage Association, held during a course of University Extension Lectures.

Rotten eggs were thrown at Helen after a meeting in Baltinglass (Ireland) in 1913. The meeting had taken place under the auspices of the Irish Women's Reform League. In contrast, Fraser's reception in Belfast was 'cordial', and the reporter reported applause being accorded to her a number of times during her talk; the event on this occasion being organised by the Irish Women's Suffrage Federation.

In 1915, she acted as temporary Honorary Secretary of the Penarth Women's Suffrage Society.

== Political career, from 1914 onward ==
During the First World War, she worked as a Commissioner for the National War Saving Committee, in the course of which she personally set up 109 local War Savings Committees in England and Wales. She was seconded to the Board of Agriculture to persuade women to work on the land. In 1917, at the suggestion of Millicent Fawcett, she was included by the UK Government as part of the official British War Mission to the US, to speak about Britain's war effort. She travelled through 40 states and spoke 332 times in 312 days. She also had a meeting with President Woodrow Wilson. In 1918, upon her return to Britain, her book of the tour Women and War Work was published.

In 1918, when women gained the right to stand as parliamentary candidates, she turned her attention to the campaign to elect women as Members of Parliament. She spoke in Cardiff on behalf of the Joint Committee for Getting Women into Parliament. She did not contest the 1918 general election. She took an active role in the affairs of a number of organisations; she was a member of the Executive Committee, of the NUWSS successor organisation the National Union of Societies for Equal Citizenship, she was a member of the Common Interests Committee of the English-Speaking Union, she was involved in the Reunion of British War Missions in USA, she was a member of the Council for the Representation of Women in the League of Nations and she was a Member of the British Institute of International Affairs.

Her efforts during the war and after had come to the attention of Prime Minister David Lloyd George and she joined his National Liberal organisation. In 1922, she was the first woman to be adopted in Scotland as an official prospective parliamentary candidate when she was selected as National Liberal candidate for the Govan Division of Glasgow for the 1922 general election. She was one of only three women candidates (all Liberals) to contest the general election in Scotland. Govan was a safe Labour seat and she was not expected to win. Fraser was a prominent member of the Glasgow and West of Scotland Association for Women's Suffrage (GWSAWS). She had the GWSAWS backing to stand in Govan on the platform of the Liberal manifesto. This platform included the establishment of widows' pensions and an equal franchise for women. During her campaign she criticised her male Labour party opponent's "appropriation of our feminist ideals and policies."

1922 general election: Glasgow Govan
| Party | Candidate | Votes | % | ±% |
|---|---|---|---|---|
| Labour | Neil Maclean | 15,441 | 62.3 | +14.5 |
| National Liberal | Miss Helen Fraser | 9,336 | 37.7 | +29.3 |
| Majority | | 6,105 | 24.6 | |
| Turnout | | 24,777 | 78.3 | |
| Labour hold | | Swing | -7.4 | |

In 1923 she went to Paris, France to attend the conference of the International Alliance of Women for Suffrage and Equal Citizenship as a delegate of the NUWSS. Later in 1923, following re-union between Lloyd George and Asquith, she switched constituencies to stand as Liberal party candidate for the Hamilton Division of Lanarkshire at the 1923 general election. Though also a Labour seat, it was believed that her prospects here were a little better. However, abuse and calumny by the Labour Party candidate Duncan Macgregor Graham made the experience a thoroughly unpleasant one.

General election 1923: Hamilton
| Party | Candidate | Votes | % | ±% |
|---|---|---|---|---|
| Labour | Duncan Macgregor Graham | 11,858 | 58.4 | +0.8 |
| Liberal | Miss Helen Fraser | 8,436 | 41.6 | n/a |
| Majority | | 3,422 | 16.8 | +1.6 |
| Turnout | | | 73.5 | −4.8 |
| Labour hold | | Swing | n/a | |

Her last political invitation was to fight the 1924 Glasgow Kelvingrove by-election but the Conservative candidate Walter Elliot was a friend, and she knew that she could poll enough votes to cause him to lose the seat, so she refused and gave up the idea of a career in politics. In 1925, she left the Liberal Party, and joined the Unionist Party. She cited her reasons in a letter published in the Glasgow Herald, those being the perceived lack of challenge to what she saw as the "tyranny of combinations and unions", which she felt should have been the intention of the party, dedicated as it was to the protection of individual rights against tyrannies.

Fraser then moved to London, where she was elected to London Borough Council as the representative for Earl's Court and was also earning money from freelance articles on women's issues. She became the managing director of British Booklet Matches (1928), which was based in Upton Park. An Edinburgh Evening News photograph shows Fraser with "approximately 10,000,000 matches."

In 1931 Fraser attended the International Congress of Business and Professional Women, which was held in Vienna. She contributed to the discussions on unemployment, stating that the problem was not so much over-production as under-consumption.. Fraser was the International Chairman of the Federation which had organised the Congress.

She was elected to Kensington Borough Council, sitting as a member for seven years.

== Suffragette Reunion ==
In February 1933 Fraser attended a suffragette reunion at the domicile of Mrs Dugdale Duval. Fraser's sister Anne was present, as were suffrage pioneers Mrs How Martyn and Mrs Graham Moffat, and Rachel Barrett and Mary Phillips; both of whom had been WSPU organisers.

== Personal life and political activities in Australia ==
While living in London, Fraser was in contact with an old friend named James Moyes who had emigrated to Australia. His wife had died, and he asked Fraser to marry him several times before she accepted. She emigrated to Sydney in 1939. She later became the President of Women for Canberra, an organisation established to get more women to stand for election to the Australian Parliament

Late in her life she wrote an autobiography, entitled A Woman in a Man's World, which was published in 1971. Fraser died in Australia in 1979.

== Archives ==
The Mitchell Library in Glasgow has a collection of material sent to them by Helen Fraser (by then known by her married name, Moyes). She sent the small collection of items, which includes some letters, newspaper cuttings, and copy of her autobiography, in 1978. Aware of the importance of preserving the story of participation in the women's movement, she said she wanted Glasgow to "have something" of her.

In 2018, the National Library of Scotland received a diary belonging to Fraser, which had been found in a recycling centre in Ulladulla, Australia. Also within the collection are some personal letters, correspondence and notes.

== Oral History ==
Brian Harrison recorded 3 oral history interviews with Fraser, in January, August and September 1975, as part of the Suffrage Interviews project, titled Oral evidence on the suffragette and suffragist movements: the Brian Harrison interviews. The interviews have been made available using the name Helen Moyes. Fraser talks about her family, and their support for women's suffrage, her involvement with the NUWSS as well as the WSPU, and the differences between the two organisations, as well as time in Wales, Scotland, France, the USA and Australia.

== Thumbnail Sketch and Cartoon ==
In 1928, The Tatler published a cartoon headed "A gathering of intelligentsia" featuring Helen, alongside Sir Ernest Benn, Sir Hugh Bell, Lord Leverhulme, Sir Robert Horne, Miss Lister and Lord Knebworth

Also in 1928, The Sphere featured her as one of nine people in its "Thumbnails: a pictorial Who's Who of people in the public eye".

== Publications ==
- Women and War Work by Helen Fraser 1918
- A Woman in a Man's World by Helen Moyes 1971
