= Lulu Glaser =

American actress (1874–1958)

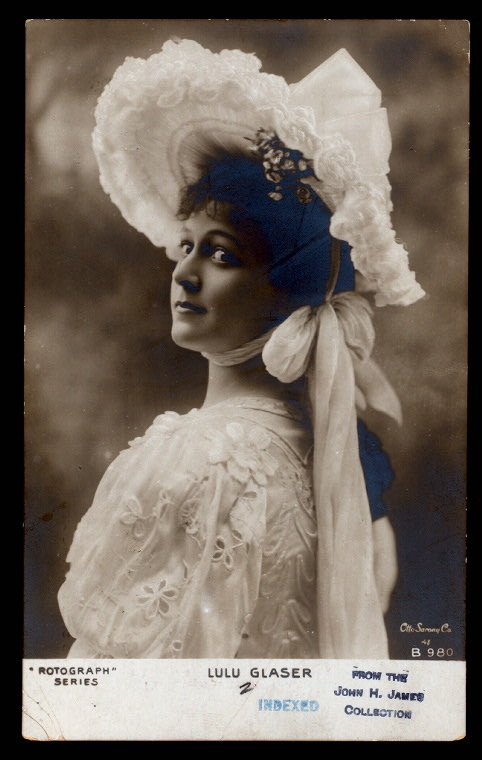
- Postcard of Glaser c. 1900
- Born: Lilian Glaser; June 2, 1874; Allegheny City, Pennsylvania, US
- Died: September 5, 1958 (aged 84); Weston, Connecticut, US
- Years active: 1891-1916
- Spouse(s): Ralph C. Herz (married 1907-1912) (died 1921); Thomas D. Richards(divorced)

Lulu Glaser (June 2, 1874 – September 5, 1958) was an American actress and vocalist. She appeared on Broadway and later Vaudeville.

== Life and career ==
Lilian "Lulu" Glaser was born on June 2, 1874, in Allegheny City, Pennsylvania. Her first appearance on the stage was at the Broadway Theatre in New York on December 30, 1891, in the play The Lion Tamer. She appeared in two more plays and on October 3, 1893, appeared as Javotte in a revival of Erminie starring Francis Wilson. She starred in title role of the 1907 Broadway musical Lola from Berlin. In 1911 and 1912, she starred in the operetta Miss Dudelsack, which toured North America and Europe.

Glaser appeared in two motion pictures, both silent films. Love's Pilgrimage to America (1916) and How Molly Made Good (1915). The latter still survives and is available on DVD. Glaser appears as herself, in a cameo along with other celebrities of the time.

She was married twice. Both marriages ended in divorce. She married actor Ralph C. Herz in 1907, but they divorced in 1912. Herz died in 1921. Her later marriage to Thomas D. Richards also ended in divorce. Lulu Glaser is often erroneously said to have been one of the many wives of DeWolf Hopper, but this is not true. Hopper's sixth and last wife was named 'Lillian (Faulkes) Glaser' and is not related to Lulu Glaser. Lulu, a singer like DeWolf, may have appeared with him on the stage at some point in their long careers.

Glaser died at Weston, Connecticut September 5, 1958.
