= Dale Fuller (actress) =

American actress

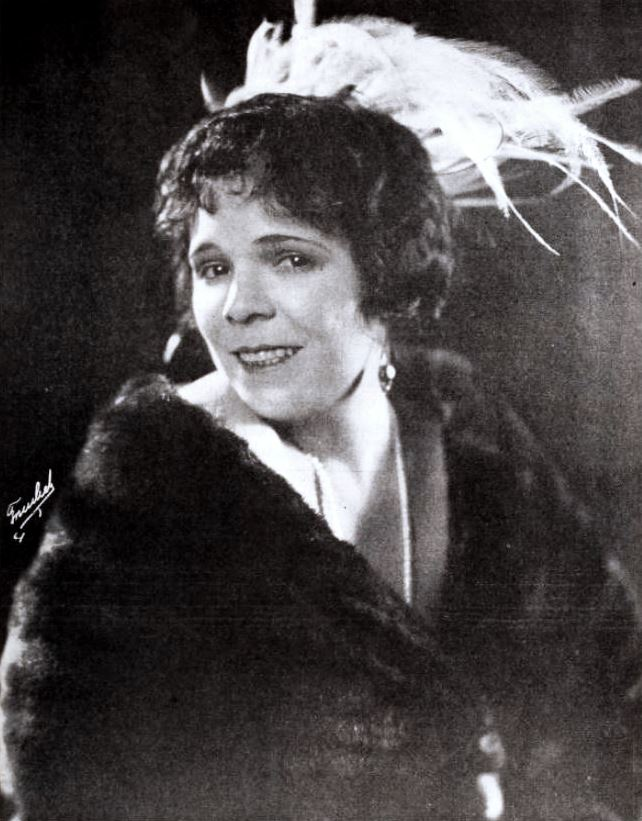
- Fuller in 1922
- Born: Marie Dale Phillipps; June 17, 1885; Santa Ana, California, U.S.
- Died: October 14, 1948 (aged 63); Pomona, California, U.S.
- Resting place: Forest Lawn Memorial Park
- Education: Mills College
- Years active: 1908–1935

Dale Fuller (born Marie Dale Phillipps; June 17, 1885 – October 14, 1948) was an American actress of the silent era. She appeared in more than 60 films between 1915 and 1935. She is best known for her role as the maid in Foolish Wives.

== Early life ==
Marie Dale Phillipps was born in Santa Ana, California, on June 17, 1885. She attended convent schools in Los Angeles and Chicago. Fan magazines from the time claimed that she attended and graduated from Mills College, and Myrtle Gebhardt reported that Fuller lost her family at 19. Fuller said family illness brought her to California, where she decided to act.

== Career ==
In 1908, she performed as a soubrette in the comedy The Trouper. She then joined the cast of Harry Bulgur’s The Flirting Princess, a musical revue, in 1910 and toured with it off and on throughout San Francisco, Chicago, Washington, and Rhode Island. The same year, she performed in the chorus of Florenz Ziegfeld’s The Girl in the Kimona in Chicago. She received good reviews for her performance, with Variety singling her out for praise.

In 1915, Fuller was introduced to Mack Sennett by Charlie Murray and joined Mack Sennett’s Keystone as an extra, with Sennett's often casting her as a harridan or victim in short films. Fuller would also occasionally play old men and boy roles due to her plain, boyish appearance and small stature. The following year, she acted with Fred Mace in the short Bath Tub Perils and suffered two broken ribs during the flood sequence.

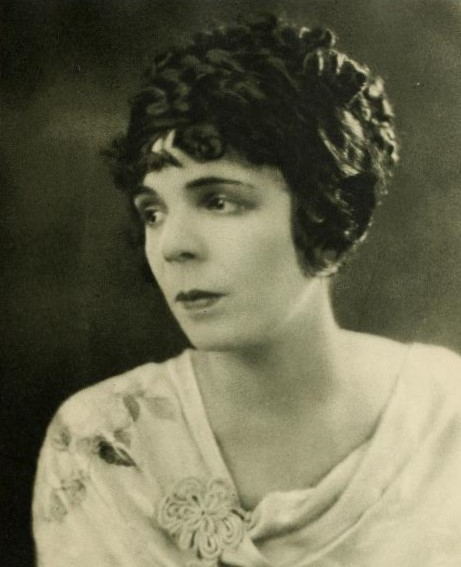
Dale Fuller in 1924

In 1920, Fuller left Keystone and began appearing in Chester Comedy films. Around this time, the Austrian film director Erich von Stroheim discovered her and cast her as a maid in Foolish Wives. During production, Fuller lost a substantial amount of weight and was hospitalized for double pneumonia. Her small part garnered positive reviews, with critics' saying her performance was the best part of the film. After the success of Foolish Wives, Fuller appeared in Manslaughter, One Wonderful Night, and Borderland.

Von Stroheim wrote a small part for her in his film Merry-Go-Round, and although her part was drastically cut from the picture, she still received good reviews for her portrayal. She next appeared in His Hour, the Elinor Glyn film Three Weeks, and von Stroheim's film McTeague, which later was renamed Greed. The studio cut most of her scenes from the film, but MGM added her to the stock company of actors that year. Fuller continued to work with von Stroheim, playing a chambermaid in his 1925 film The Merry Widow and as Fay Wray's mother in The Wedding March.

Fuller played Renée Adorée's mother in The Cossacks, and acted in Thomas Meighan's film The Canadian as Gertie. Her last film was A Tale of Two Cities, in which she played an uncredited role.

Fuller died on October 14, 1948, in Pomona, California of valvular heart disease. She is interred at Forest Lawn Memorial Park in Glendale, California.

== Partial filmography ==
- A Tuner of Notes (1917) -
- Foolish Wives (1922) - Maruschka
- Borderland (1922) - Elly
- Manslaughter (1922) - Prisoner
- Robin Hood (1922) - Peasant (uncredited)
- One Wonderful Night (1922) - Maid
- Souls for Sale (1923) - Abigail Tweedy
- Merry-Go-Round (1923) - Marianka Huber
- Tea: With a Kick! (1923) - Kittie Wiggle - Reformer
- Reno (1923) - Aunt Alida Kane
- The Marriage Circle (1924) - Neurotic Patient
- Three Weeks (1924) - Anna
- Babbitt (1924) - Tillie
- His Hour (1924) - Olga Gleboff
- Husbands and Lovers (1924) - Marie
- Greed (1924) - Maria
- Tomorrow's Love (1925) - Maid
- The Devil's Cargo (1925) - Millie
- Lady of the Night (1925) - Miss Carr - Florence's Aunt
- The Woman Hater (1925) - Secretary
- The Merry Widow (1925) - Sadoja's Chambermaid (uncredited)
- The Shadow on the Wall (1925) - The Missus
- The Unchastened Woman (1925) - Hildegarde Sanbury
- The Only Thing (1925) - Governess
- Ben-Hur (1925) - Amrah
- Memory Lane (1926)
- Her Second Chance (1926) - Delia
- Volcano! (1926) - Cédrien
- The Speeding Venus (1926) - Midge Rooney
- Midnight Lovers (1926) - Heatley
- The Canadian (1926) - Gertie Marsh
- The Beauty Shoppers (1927) - Olga
- The King of Kings (1927) - Woman at Crucifixion (uncredited)
- Fazil (1928) - Zouroya - Keeper of the Harem
- The Cossacks (1928) - Ulitka - Maryana's Mother
- The Wedding March (1928) - Katerina Schrammel - Mitzi's mother
- House of Horror (1929) - Gladys
- Glad Rag Doll (1929) - Miss Peabody
- The Sacred Flame (1929) - Nurse Wayland
- The Man from Blankley's (1930) - Miss Finders
- The Office Wife (1930) - Secretary Andrews
- The Great Meadow (1931) - Pioneer Woman (uncredited)
- Emma (1932) - Maid
- The Trial of Vivienne Ware (1932) - Gossip (uncredited)
- Rasputin and the Empress (1932) - Minor Role (uncredited)
- Face in the Sky (1933) - Clerk, Circleville General Store (uncredited)
- House of Mystery (1934) - Geraldine Carfax
- Twentieth Century (1934) - Sadie
- We Live Again (1934) - Eugenia Botchkova
- A Tale of Two Cities (1935) - Old Hag (uncredited)
