= The Truthful Liar =

1922 film by Thomas N. Heffron

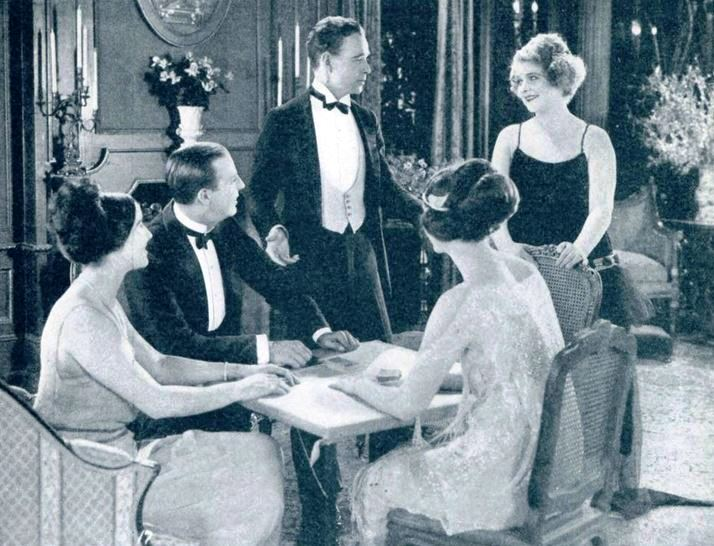
- Still with Wanda Hawley and Guy Edward Hearn (standing)
- Directed by: Thomas N. Heffron
- Screenplay by: Percy Heath; Will J. Payne
- Starring: Wanda Hawley; Guy Edward Hearn; Charles A. Stevenson; Casson Ferguson; Lloyd Whitlock; George Siegmann; E. Alyn Warren
- Cinematography: William E. Collins
- Production company: Realart Pictures Corporation
- Distributed by: Paramount Pictures
- Release date: April 23, 1922
- Running time: 60 minutes
- Country: United States
- Language: Silent (English intertitles)

The Truthful Liar is a lost 1922 American mystery silent film directed by Thomas N. Heffron and written by Percy Heath and Will J. Payne. The film stars Wanda Hawley, Guy Edward Hearn, Charles A. Stevenson, Casson Ferguson, Lloyd Whitlock, George Siegmann, and E. Alyn Warren. The film was released on April 23, 1922, by Paramount Pictures.

== Plot ==
As described in a film magazine, Tess Haggard plunges Arthur Sinclair into despair after she marries the sturdy David Haggard, a rising engineer. While her husband is away on "location," she visits an illegal gambling house with Arthur and other friends. While there the place is first robbed by crooks and then raided by the police, and she loses her rings, lies to her husband but is detected, writes a silly letter and is blackmailed, and is briefly charged with murder. Her troubles are resolved when a Peteer Vanetti confesses to the crime and all of the deceptions by Tess are laid bare and forgiven.

== Cast ==
- Wanda Hawley as Tess Haggard
- Guy Edward Hearn as David Haggard
- Charles A. Stevenson as Harvey Mattison
- Casson Ferguson as Arthur Sinclair
- Lloyd Whitlock as Larry Steffens
- George Siegmann as Mark Potts
- E. Alyn Warren as Peteer Vanetti
- Charles K. French as Police Commissioner Rogers
