= The Man from the Clouds =

1918 novel

- First US edition
- Author: J. Storer Clouston
- Language: English
- Genre: Spy thriller
- Publisher: William Blackwood and Sons (UK); George H. Doran (US)
- Publication date: 1918
- Publication place: United Kingdom
- Media type: Print

The Man from the Clouds is a 1918 spy thriller novel by J. Storer Clouston. Like his better-known The Spy in Black it takes place during the First World War.

== Synopsis ==
Roger Merton, a pilot in the Royal Navy crash lands on an island off the Scottish coast. Discovering it has been taken over by German agents, he decides to pretend to be on their side in order to infiltrate them and find out exactly what is being planned.

== Bibliography ==
- Burton, Alan. Historical Dictionary of British Spy Fiction. Rowman & Littlefield, 2016.
- Royle, Trevor. Macmillan Companion to Scottish Literature. Macmillan, 1984.
