= Molly Pearson =

British actress (1876–1959)

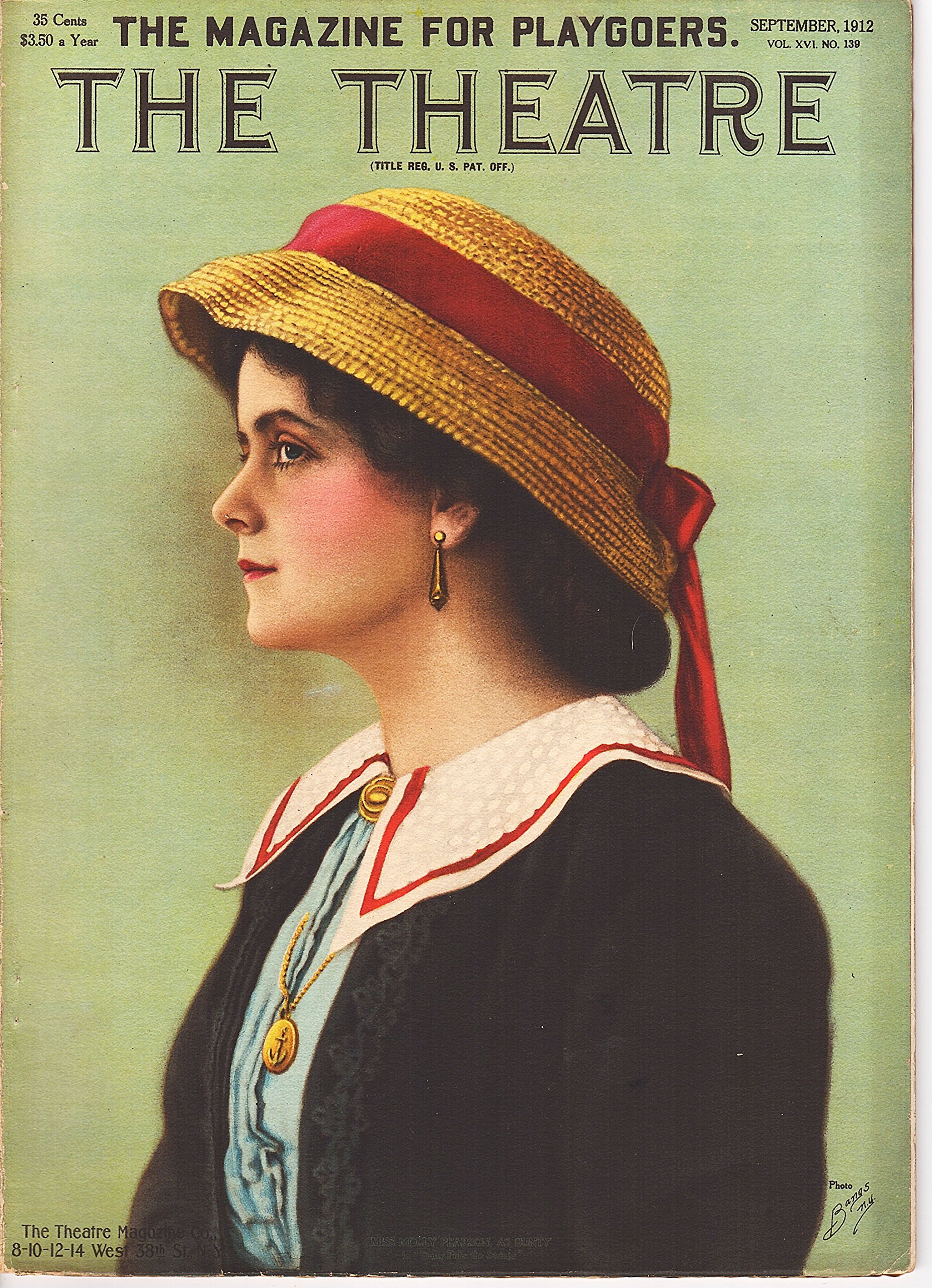
- Molly Pearson as "Bunty" on the cover of The Theatre.
- Born: Mary Elizabeth Pearson; 19 August 1875; Edinburgh, Scotland
- Died: 29 January 1959 (aged 83); Sandy Hook, Connecticut, USA
- Occupation: Actress
- Spouse: Ethlebert D. Hales

Mary Elizabeth "Molly" Pearson (19 August 1875 – 29 January 1959) was a Scottish stage actress of the early 20th century. She was born in Edinburgh to parents Mandell Pearson (1844-1880) and Amelia "Emily" Rosalie Hilliard (1846-1928).

== Theatrical career ==
Pearson performed in numerous places around the world, including England, the United States, (particularly Broadway), Australia and Africa. She came to America with the Olga Nethersole Company.

A January 1908 production of Carmen presented by Nethersole featured Pearson playing 'Dolores'. The English troupe was joined by American actor Frank Mills when it played the Majestic Theatre in Fort Wayne, Indiana. She was in the supporting cast of The Passing of the Third Floor Back (1909), a play which starred Johnston Forbes-Robertson. The play was written by Jerome K. Jerome. The Robertson company, of London, England origin, presented the theatrical entertainment at the Maxine Elliott Theatre. Pearson later reprised her role in the 1918 film adaptation.

In October 1911 Pearson appeared at Collier's Comedy Theatre as the leading lady in the Scottish play, Bunty Pulls the Strings, written by Graham Moffat. Pearson read for the role of 'Bunty' in Moffat's presence at the Haymarket Theatre prior to being engaged to portray the character in New York City. In the remote Scottish village where the play has its setting, a typical woman wears a hoop skirt. The attire was both fashionable and a part of enforced decorum for women in 1800. Many theatergoers saw Bunty which ran for an entire season. The Grand Opera House, York staged the play before its final run in Pittsburgh.

While in New York, Pearson was a guest of the Century Theatre Club which convened at the Hotel Astor on 27 October 1911. She was accompanied by fellow Scottish actress Margaret Nyblock. Pearson described the history of Scottish plays and players while Nyblock gave some readings in a Scottish accent. Edith Taliaferro and Margaret Greene worked with Pearson in Tipping the Winner (1914). The play was produced by the Longacre Theatre, 220 West 48th Street, in Manhattan.

Hobson's Choice (1916) is a play which starred Pearson, Viola Roache, Whitford Kane and Olive Wilmont Davis. It was staged at Teller's Theatre, 912 Broadway, Brooklyn, New York.

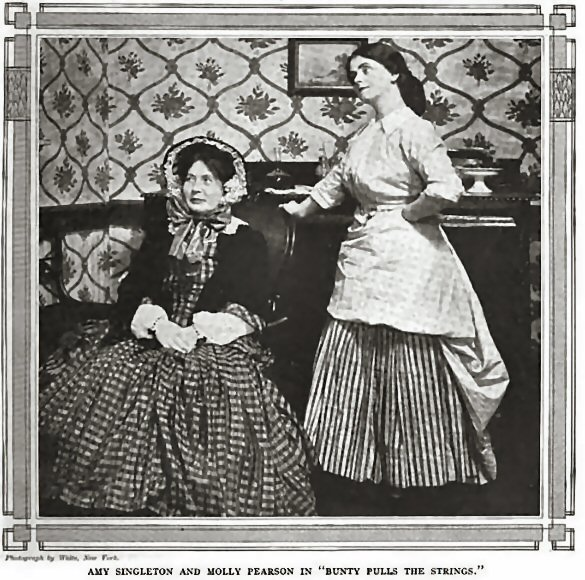
Molly Pearson (right) with Amy Singleton in Bunty Pulls the Strings (Everybody's Magazine, 1912)

In February 1917 Pearson acted in The Professor's Love Story before an audience at the Savoy Theatre. It was produced by H. B. Irving and featured George Arliss in the role of 'Professor Goodwillie'. Jeanne Eagels, then a very young performer, was among the players. The Belmont Theatre at 121 West 48th Street, New York City, staged Penny Wise in March 1919. Similar to Bunty in its theme, the setting of this play is Lancashire. It is a farcical comedy in three acts. Pearson performed the part of Rosa Dobbins. Critics considered this production lacking in both charm and humour when compared to Bunty. The plot centred on a mother who attempted to collect life insurance on her son, who was imperfectly dead. Pearson played the wife of the unfortunate son. Her role was somewhat secondary to that of her devious mother-in-law.

Pearson was affiliated with the Theatre Guild repertory company in 1927 and 1928. Her fellow actors included Fredric March and Erskine Sanford. Touring many cities, towns and hamlets in the United States, the company's repertory consisted of The Silver Cord, The Guardsman, Arms and the Man, and Mr. Pim Passes By. Robert W. Lillard, a member of the staff of the New York Herald Tribune, penned White Flame. The play was presented to audiences at the Vanderbilt Theatre in November 1929. Produced by James Kenney, Pearson was a cast member.

Pearson performed at the Forrest Theatre (Eugene O'Neill Theatre) in a 1931 run of Lean Harvest, written by Ronald Jean. Nigel Bruce, Leslie Banks, Vera Allen and Ada Potter were in the acting troupe.

She retired from the stage in 1940. In the 1930s she continued acting in productions of The Unsophisticates, Lean Harvest, The Anatomist, Save Me The Waltz, and Young Mr. Disraeli. Her final performance was in Ladies in Retirement.

== Marriage ==
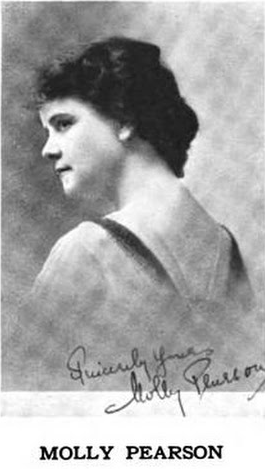
Molly Pearson, from a 1916 publication.

In May 1913 Pearson married Ethlebert D. Hales who played the father in Bunty Pulls The Strings. Hales also portrayed Reverend Davidson in Rain (1922) with Jeanne Eagels. Molly and Ethelbert Hales left New York and travelled via the West Indies to Southampton, England on her honeymoon.

== Death ==
Pearson died in Sandy Hook, Connecticut in 1959, following an extended illness. She was 83. Her husband predeceased her.
