= The Lunatic at Large (novel) =

1899 novel

- First edition
- Author: J. Storer Clouston
- Language: English
- Genre: Comedy
- Publisher: William Blackwood & Sons
- Publication date: 1899
- Publication place: United Kingdom
- Media type: Print
- Followed by: The Lunatic at Large Again

The Lunatic at Large is an 1899 comedy novel by the British writer J. Storer Clouston. A popular success, it was followed by three sequels The Lunatic at Large Again (1922), The Lunatic Still at Large (1923), and The Lunatic In Charge (1926).

== Synopsis ==
Francis Beveridge escapes from a lunatic asylum and heads for London. There, at a luxury hotel he meets up with a travelling German baron and becomes his guide to the sights of England and its capital city.

== Film adaptations ==
It has been made into films on two occasions, a 1921 British silent film directed by and starring Henry Edwards and a 1927 American silent film directed by Fred C. Newmeyer and starring Leon Errol, Dorothy Mackaill and Warren Cook.

== Bibliography ==
- Goble, Alan. The Complete Index to Literary Sources in Film. Walter de Gruyter, 1999.
- Royle, Trevor. Macmillan Companion to Scottish Literature. Macmillan, 1984.
