= Casson Ferguson =

American actor

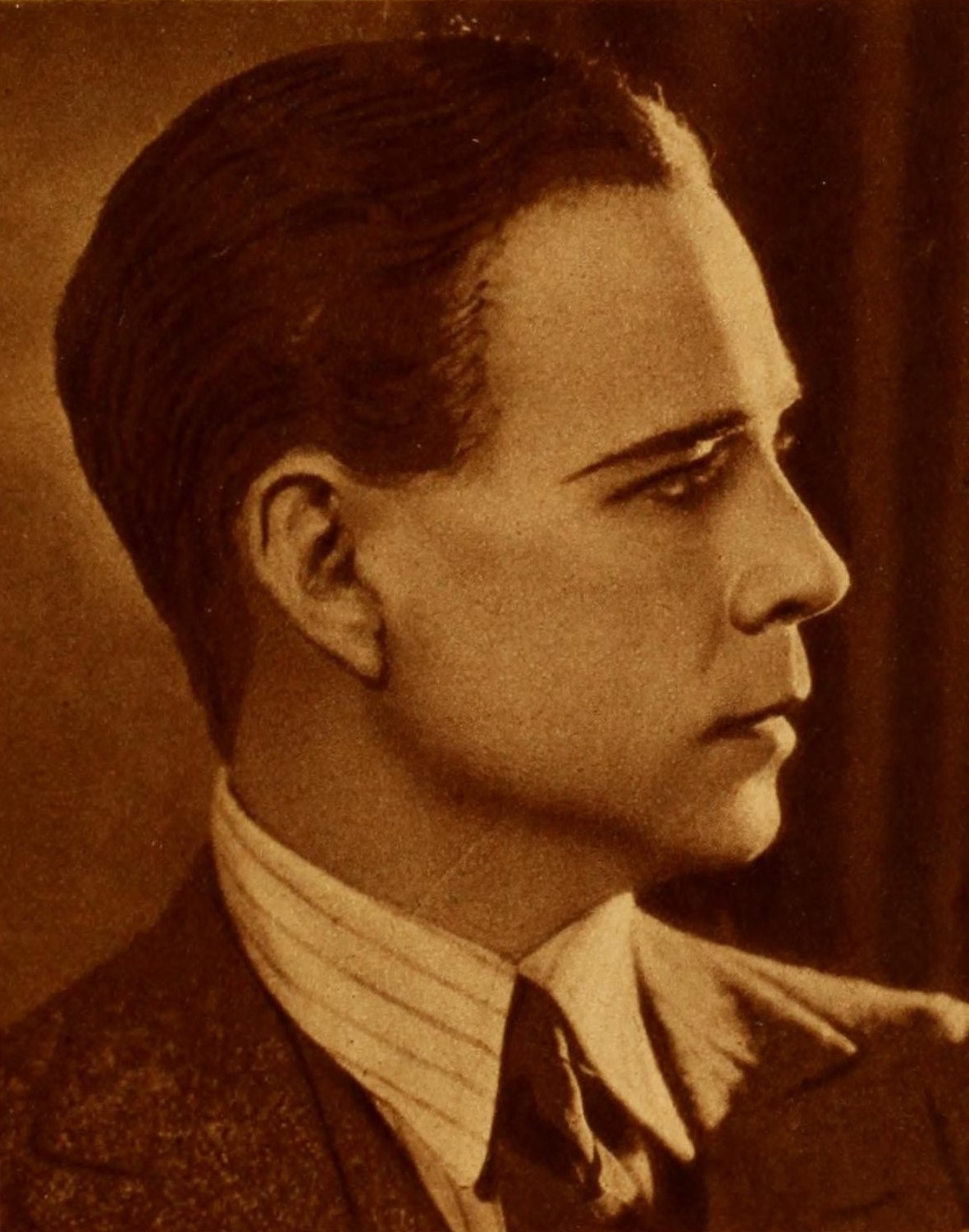
- Ferguson in 1925
- Born: May 29, 1891; Alexandria, Louisiana, US
- Died: February 12, 1929 (aged 37); Culver City, California, US
- Occupation: Actor
- Years active: 1917–1928

Casson Ferguson (May 29, 1891 – February 12, 1929) was an American film actor of the silent era. He appeared in more than 50 films between 1917 and 1928.

His father was John J. Ferguson, a jeweler in Alexandria, Louisiana. Early in his career Casson was a member of the Mantel Shakespeare Players in New Orleans before moving to California to pursue a movie career, first with the Selig Company, then as a leading man. In 1928 he toured Europe and performed as a singer and actor in London and Paris. Returning to California, he married Catherine Mallon. Not long after his marriage, he died of pneumonia at the age of 37. Two days later his wife Catherine died of pneumonia, as well as her mother soon after of pneumonia.

== Partial filmography ==
- The Mystery of No. 47 (1917) - Buffington
- Face Value (1918) - Louis Maguire
- The Shuttle (1918) - G. Selden
- Unclaimed Goods (1918) - Cocopah Kid
- Mile-a-Minute Kendall (1918) - Eddie Semper
- The Only Road (1918) - Bob Armstrong
- How Could You Jean? (1918) - Ted Burton Jr
- Alias Mary Brown (1918) - Dick Browning, aka Mary Brown
- The Gypsy Trail (1918) - Michael Rudder
- Jane Goes A-Wooing (1919) - Micky Donovan
- The Drifters (1919) - Hugh MacLaren
- Johnny Get Your Gun (1919) - Bert Whitney
- Partners Three (1919) - Arthur Gould
- Putting It Over (1919) - Perkins
- Secret Service (1919) - Wilfred Varney
- Flame of the Desert (1919) - Sir Charles Channing
- Peg o' My Heart (1919) - Alaric Chicester
- The Prince Chap (1920) - Jack, Earl of Huntington
- Merely Mary Ann (1920) - Lancelot
- Madame X (1920) - Raymond Floriot
- The Mutiny of the Elsinore (1920) - Dick Somers
- Bunty Pulls the Strings (1921) - Jeemy
- The Unknown Wife (1921) - Donald Grant
- What's a Wife Worth? (1921) - Bruce Morrison
- At the End of the World (1921)
- A Virginia Courtship (1921) - Tom Fairfax
- The Law and the Woman (1922) - Phil Long
- The Truthful Liar (1922) - Arthur Sinclair
- Over The Border (1922) - Val Galbraith
- Borderland (1922) - Clyde Meredith
- Manslaughter (1922) - Bobby Dorest
- Drums of Fate (1923) - David Verne
- Grumpy (1923) - Chamberlin Jarvis
- A Gentleman of Leisure (1923) - Sir Spencer Deever
- Her Reputation (1923) - Jack Calhoun
- The Road to Yesterday (1925) - Adrian Thompkyns
- The Wedding Song (1925) - Madison Melliah
- Cobra (1925) - Jack Dorning
- Forbidden Waters (1926) - Sylvester
- For Alimony Only (1926) - Bertie Waring
- The King of Kings (1927) - Scribe
- Tenth Avenue (1928) - Curley
