= Ralph C. Herz =

French-born American actor and singer (1878–1921)

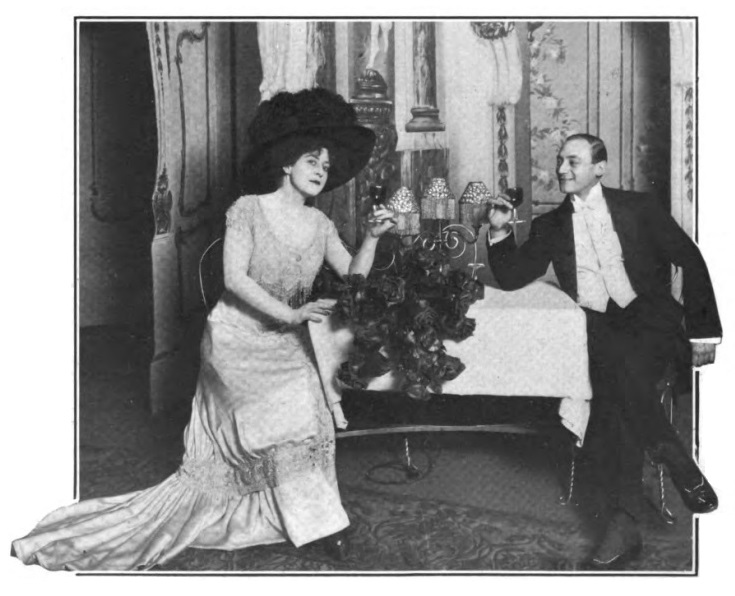
- Bessie Wynn and Herz
- Born: Ralph Caliste Herz; March 25, 1878; Paris, France
- Died: July 12, 1921 (aged 43); Atlantic City, New Jersey, US
- Resting place: Atlantic City Cemetery, Pleasantville, New Jersey
- Occupation: Actor
- Years active: 1902–1920
- Spouse(s): Lulu Glaser; Leah May; Frances Logan

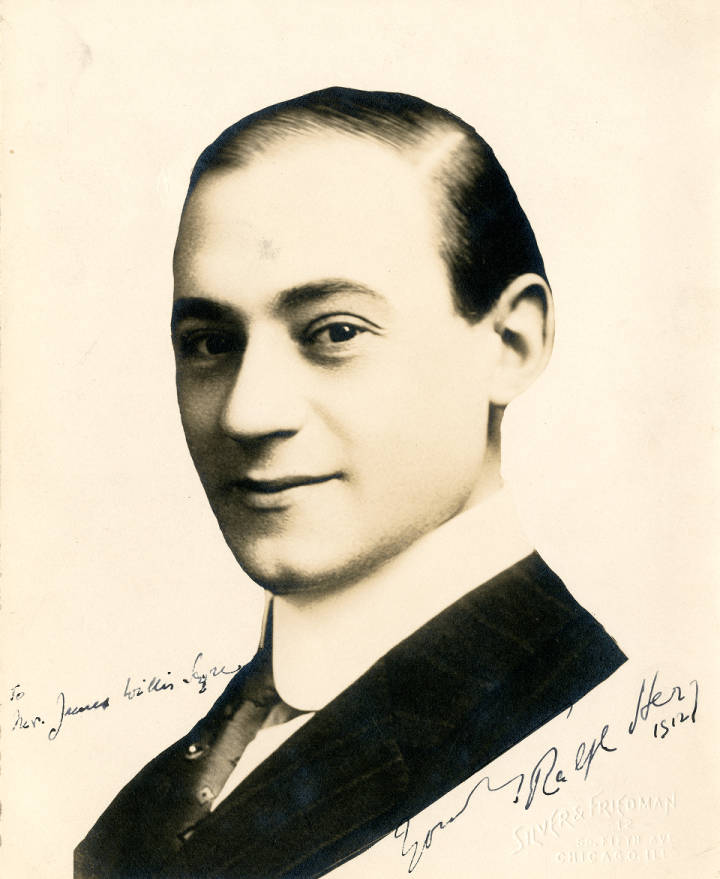
Ralph Herz c.1912

Ralph C. Herz (March 25, 1878 – July 12, 1921) was an actor and singer born of American parents in France. He spent the majority of his career in the United States. He appeared in vaudeville, was popular in musical plays and was often on Broadway. He made a handful of silent films before his death at 43 from diabetes in 1921. Herz was at one time married to musical star Lulu Glaser.

== Filmography ==
- The Purple Lady (1916)
- The Mystery of No. 47 (1917)
- The Matinee Idol (1917) short
- Married But Single (1917) short
- Winning an Heiress (1917) short
- The Love Dope (1917) short
- The Regeneration of Reginald (1917) short
