= J. Storer Clouston =

Scottish author and historian

Joseph Storer Clouston OBE (23 May 1870, Cumberland, England – 23 June 1944, Orkney, Scotland) was a Scottish author and historian.

== Life and work ==
J. S. Clouston, the son of psychiatrist Sir Thomas Clouston, was from an "old Orkney family", according to his obituary in The Scotsman. The Cloustons descend from Havard Gunnason (fl. 1090), Chief Counsellor to Haakon, Earl of Orkney, and later became landed gentry taking their name from their estate, Clouston.

After being educated at Merchiston Castle School, Edinburgh, and Magdalen College, Oxford, he was called to the bar at the Inner Temple in London in 1895, but never practised as a lawyer.

Soon after embarking on a career as a writer, he published one of his most popular novels, The Lunatic at Large. He was also a historian, author of a great history of Orkney, a founder member and second president of the Orkney Antiquarian Society, and a Fellow of the Society of Antiquaries of Scotland. His The Spy in Black was made into a successful film in the late 1930s. His First Offence was also filmed in France as Drôle de drame (directed by Marcel Carné, 1937). His final novel was the 1941 thriller Beastmark the Spy.

He died at home at Smoogro House, Orphir, Orkney. After the death of his father's cousin (William Clouston, 23rd of Clouston), Clouston became head of the family. In 1903, he married his fourth cousin, Winifred, daughter of Charles Stewart Clouston, MD. They had two sons, Harald Thomas Stewart (who succeeded his father) and Erlend, and a daughter, Marjorie.

Asked how to say his name, he told The Literary Digest it was cloos'-ton, "with ou as in group." (Charles Earle Funk, What's the Name, Please?, Funk & Wagnalls, 1936.)

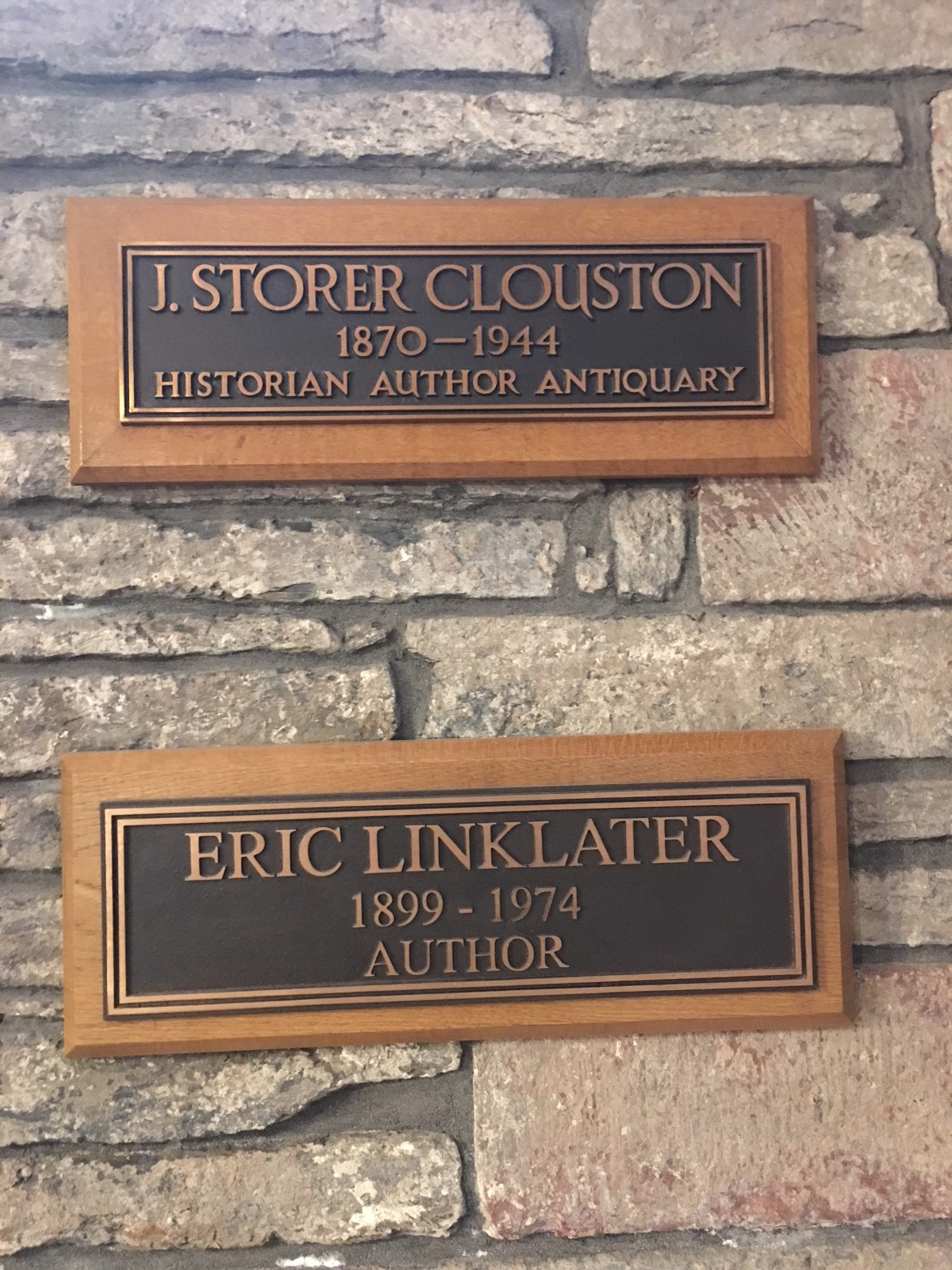
Memorial to J. Storer Clouston in Kirkwall Cathedral, Orkney

== Works ==
His fiction and nonfiction works include:

- Vandrad the Viking: or the Feud and the Spell (1898)
- The Lunatic at Large (1899)
- The Duke (1900)
- The Adventures of M. D'Haricot (1902)
- Our Lady's Inn (1903)
- Garmiscath (1904)
- Count Bunker (1906)
- A Country Family (1908)
- The Prodigal Father (1909)
- Tales of King Fido (1909)
- The Peer's Progress (1910)
- The Mystery of Number 47 (1912) (also known as His First Offence)
- Records of the Earldom of Orkney 1299-1614 (1914)
- Two's Two (1916)
- The Spy in Black (1917)
- The Man from the Clouds (1918)
- Simon (1919)
- Carrington's Cases (1920)
- The Lunatic at Large Again (1922)
- The Lunatic Still at Large (1923)
- The Two Strange Men (1924)
- Tales of King Fido (1924)
- The Lunatic in Charge (1926)
- Mr. Essington in Love (1927)
- The Jade's Progress (1928)
- After the Deed (1929)
- Colonel Dam (1930)
- A History of Orkney (1932)
- The Virtuous Vamp (1932)
- The Best Story Ever (1932)
- Button Brains (1933)
- The Chemical Baby (1934)
- Real Champagne (1934)
- Our Member Mr. Mittlebury (1935)
- Scotland Expects (1936)
- Scots Wha Ha'e (1936)
- Not Since Genesis (1938)
- The Man in Steel (1939)
- Beastmark the Spy (1941)
