= Out West with the Hardys =

1938 film by George B. Seitz

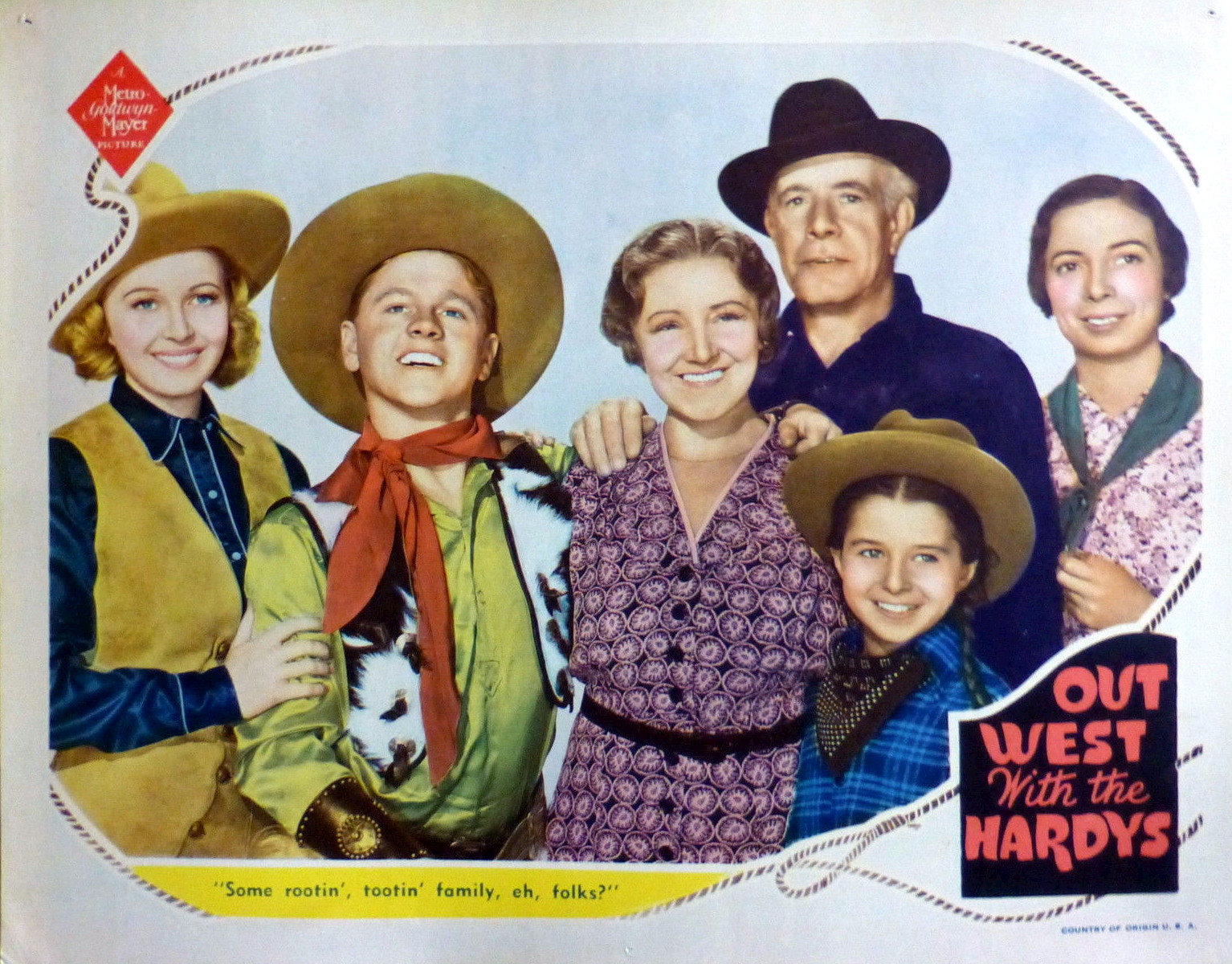
- Lobby card
- Directed by: George B. Seitz
- Written by: Aurania Rouverol; Kay Van Riper; William Ludwig; Agnes Christine Johnston
- Produced by: Jack J. Cohn
- Starring: Mickey Rooney; Lewis Stone; Fay Holden; Cecilia Parker; Ann Rutherford; Sara Haden
- Cinematography: Lester White
- Edited by: Ben Lewis
- Music by: David Snell
- Production company: Metro-Goldwyn-Mayer
- Distributed by: Loew's Inc.
- Release date: November 25, 1938
- Running time: 84 minutes
- Country: United States
- Language: English
- Budget: $310,000

Out West with the Hardys is a 1938 American comedy film directed by George B. Seitz and the fifth film in the Andy Hardy series of sixteen films.

== Plot ==
Judge Hardy gets a request to help out an old friend so he takes his family on a holiday out west when a friend has legal difficulties over water rights.

== Cast ==
- Mickey Rooney as Andy Hardy
- Lewis Stone as Judge James 'Jim' K. Hardy
- Fay Holden as Mrs. Emily Hardy
- Cecilia Parker as Marian Hardy
- Ann Rutherford as Polly Benedict
- Sara Haden as Aunt Milly Forrest
- Don Castle as Dennis Hunt
- Virginia Weidler as 'Jake' Holt
- Gordon Jones as Ray Holt
- Ralph Morgan as Bill Northcote
- Nana Bryant as Dora Northcote
- Tom Neal as Aldrich Brown
- John Hubbard as Cliff Thomas (as Anthony Allan)
