= The Hardys Ride High =

1939 film by George B. Seitz

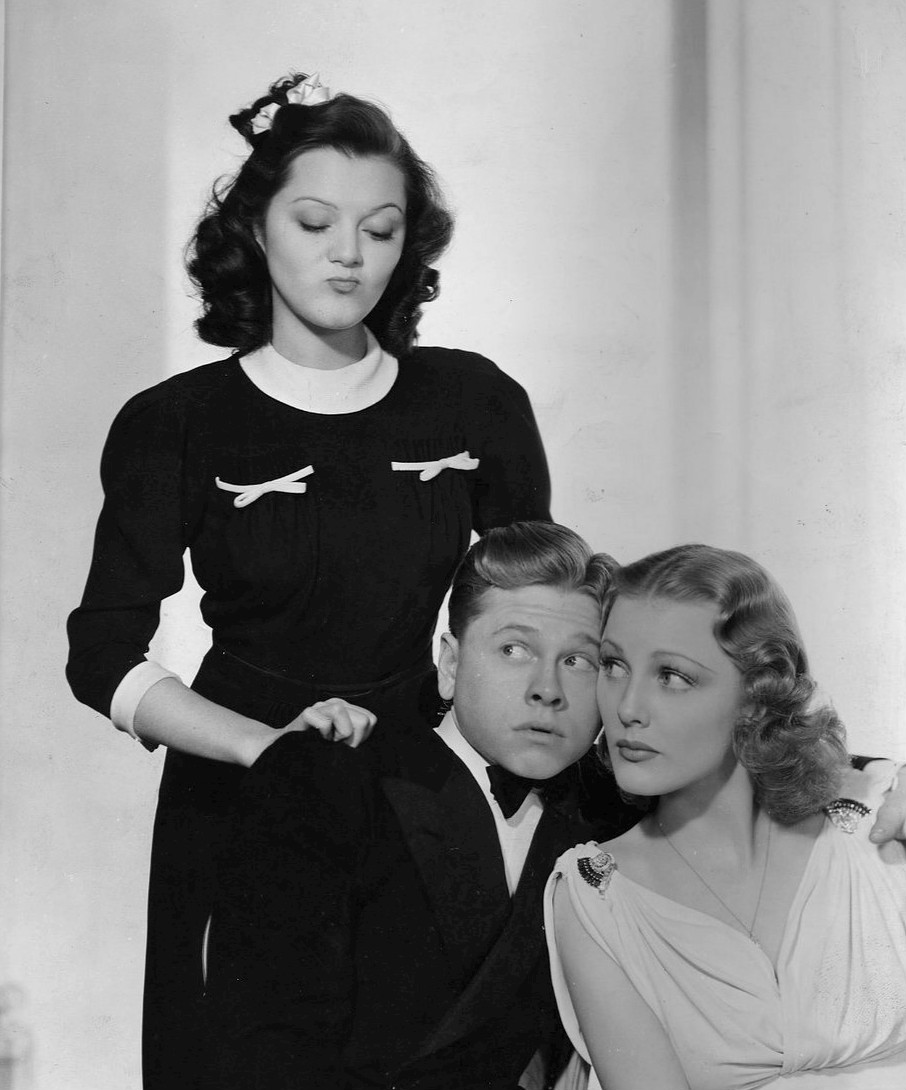
- Ann Rutherford, Mickey Rooney and Virginia Grey
- Directed by: George B. Seitz
- Written by: Aurania Rouverol
- Screenplay by: Agnes Christine Johnston; Kay Van Riper; William Ludwig; Carey Wilson
- Produced by: Lou L. Ostrow
- Starring: Mickey Rooney; Lewis Stone
- Cinematography: Lester White; John F. Seitz
- Edited by: Ben Lewis
- Music by: David Snell
- Distributed by: Metro-Goldwyn-Mayer
- Release date: April 21, 1939
- Running time: 81 minutes
- Country: United States
- Language: English

The Hardys Ride High (1939) is the sixth film of Metro-Goldwyn-Mayer's Andy Hardy series.

The film went into production in January 13, 1939 and shooting lasted until February.

== Plot ==
Judge James Hardy is informed by Jonas Bronell, a lawyer from Detroit, that Hardy will inherit $2 million if he proves to be the great-great-grandson of Colonel James Standish Leeds, a hero of the War of 1812. This is due to the most recent Mr. Leeds dying without a clear heir.

16-year-old Andy goes to see his girlfriend, Polly. However, she is entertaining the more mature Dick Bannersly, who looks down on Andy for not smoking or drinking yet. This leads to an argument between Polly and Andy about his lack of sophistication.

Hardy tells his family that they may inherit a fortune. His wife, Emily, can barely believe it. Andy and his sister, Marian, immediately start thinking about what they could buy.

The Hardy family goes to Detroit, accompanied by Aunt Milly. On the way, Milly meets a friendly man named Terry Archer. The family stays in the Leeds mansion while Hardy’s descent of Col. Leeds is legally confirmed. Philip Westcott, the adopted son of the late Mr. Leeds, shows no ill-will, explaining his adopted father set aside a trust fund for him. Westcott learns that Hardy is supposedly related to Col. Leeds through the colonel’s older son, Andrew. Later, Westcott tells his girlfriend, Consuela McNish, that he is certain that Col. Leeds only had one biological son, and it wasn't Andrew.

Marian buys an expensive gown and charges it to her father's account, but claims she bought it with her allowance. Milly goes on a date with Archer, but when he asks her to invest in his real estate business she sends him away. Emily modestly buys an iron frying pan that she’s wanted for years.

Andy and Westcott go to the Paradise Club. Westcott orders drinks with rum, which Andy turns down. Consuela, who works as a chorus girl at the club, asks Andy to have supper with her. When he arrives at her apartment, however, he panics and runs away. In the process, he loses a cigarette case that he borrowed from Westcott. Andy buys Westcott a new one, charging it to his father's account.

Hardy finds a book in the mansion's library that was a gift from Col. Leeds to Andrew. The handwriting on the first page refers to Andrew as a "foster son." The Hardy family abruptly returns to their hometown of Carvel.

Westcott reveals to Bronell that he inscribed the dedication to Andrew in the book. He accuses Judge Hardy of taking the book to stop the information from coming to light, as Hardy doesn’t know it to be fake. Westcott sees this as an opportunity to take Hardy to court, should he try to claim the inheritance.

Hardy inspects an old family picture of Col. Leeds, and discovers that Andrew’s last name was actually Harper; he was Mrs. Leeds’ son from a previous marriage. Hardy thinks of burning the book and the picture. However, he stops himself when he realizes that he would be compromising his morals. He tells Emily about his discovery, and she is both supportive and relieved to not be rich. Bronell informs Hardy about Westcott’s trap, and Hardy realizes that if he hadn’t told the truth he could have gone to prison. The Leeds fortune will go to charity.

Andy tells his father about the evening with Westcott and Consuela, and that the cigarette case cost $175 (he thought it was only $1.75). Marian tells the truth about her expensive dress and she plans to send it back. Milly makes a date with the local pharmacist. Andy visits Polly, claiming that he now smokes, spends time with chorus girls, and has become an alcoholic. She hugs and begs him to go back to his old ways, much to Andy’s delight.

== Cast ==
- Lewis Stone as Judge James K. Hardy
- Mickey Rooney as Andy Hardy
- Cecilia Parker as Marian Hardy
- Fay Holden as Mrs. Emily Hardy
- Ann Rutherford as Polly Benedict
- Sara Haden as Mildred 'Aunt Milly' Forrest
- Virginia Grey as Consuela MacNish
- Minor Watson as Mr. Terry B. Archer
- John 'Dusty' King as Philip 'Phil' Westcott
- John T. Murray as Don Davis, the Druggist
- Halliwell Hobbes as Dobbs, the Butler
- George Irving as Mr. Jonas Bronell
- Aileen Pringle as Miss Booth, Dress Saleslady
- Marsha Hunt as Susan Bowen
- Donald Briggs as Caleb Bowen
- William T. Orr as Dick Bannersly

== Release and Reception ==
The film was released at Big Capitol Theater in New York City in early April before opening to the wider market.

Critic Frank Nugent disliked the film, writing in The New York Times that the plot was "an excuse for a cinematic solo by Master Rooney." He described Mickey Rooney as, "That gnomish prodigy, that half-human, half-goblin man-child..." The Film Daily was more positive, praising the film as "One of the most amusing of the Hardy series..." and that "Mickey Rooney was never funnier."
