= Andy Hardy's Private Secretary =

1941 film by George B. Seitz

- Directed by: George B. Seitz
- Written by: Aurania Rouverol; Katharine Brush
- Screenplay by: Jane Murfin; Harry Ruskin; Carey Wilson
- Starring: Mickey Rooney; Kathryn Grayson
- Cinematography: Lester White
- Edited by: Elmo Veron
- Music by: Herbert Stothart
- Production company: Metro-Goldwyn-Mayer
- Distributed by: Loew's Inc.
- Release date: February 21, 1941
- Running time: 101 minutes
- Country: United States
- Language: English
- Budget: $329,000
- Box office: $2,402,000

Andy Hardy's Private Secretary is a 1941 American comedy film directed by George B. Seitz and starring Lewis Stone, Mickey Rooney, Kathryn Grayson, Ann Rutherford and Fay Holden. It was the tenth of the 16-film Andy Hardy series. Marian Hardy (Cecelia Parker) does not appear in this film.

== Plot ==
A week from the end of high school, Andy (Mickey Rooney) is keenly anticipating his graduation, but is putting more effort into running the various student committees – most of which he chairs – than studying for his examinations. His father, honorable judge Hardy (Lewis Stone) learns that Andy has been giving money for tuition to a fellow student, a girl named Kathryn Land (Kathryn Grayson). Judge Hardy also learns that Kathryn's father is poor.

On his father's advice, Andy attempts to offload some of his own study work, and asks Kathryn Land to be his private secretary, much to the chagrin of his steady girlfriend Polly Benedict (Ann Rutherford). Polly gets quite jealous of Kathryn when she discovers that Andy's bought stockings for Kathryn to wear at graduation. Kathryn's brother Harry (Todd Karns) takes on the task of designing decorations for the graduation ceremony. The father, a down-on-his-luck international travel expert, is helped by Judge Hardy's connections in the US State Department to find a better job.

While Andy is struggling with his English exams, Kathryn's brother Harry proves to be quite the scholar, showing no problems at all with his exams. Andy is devastated when he miserably fails his English examination, which means he cannot graduate. He admits his failure to the class and resigns from all committee work. Kathryn and Harry's father is offered a job in South America, which would mean money, but also that the family would have to leave before graduation was completed for the siblings. Andy wants them both to graduate, and "helps" them out by editing the telegram to the father about the date for traveling to the south, letting them stay a few days longer. Andy's attempt to help his friends attend commencement results in another disaster — the father's job offer is rescinded. But his friends persuade the school principal that the school rules allow him to retake the exam, given his high quality work during the past year. He passes – but only just.

All ends well, of course. Andy graduates and is given a new car by his father; Kathryn sings at the ceremony, Harry wins the Governor's Prize and is offered a job, and their impoverished father Steven Land (Ian Hunter) gets a job as a court interpreter.

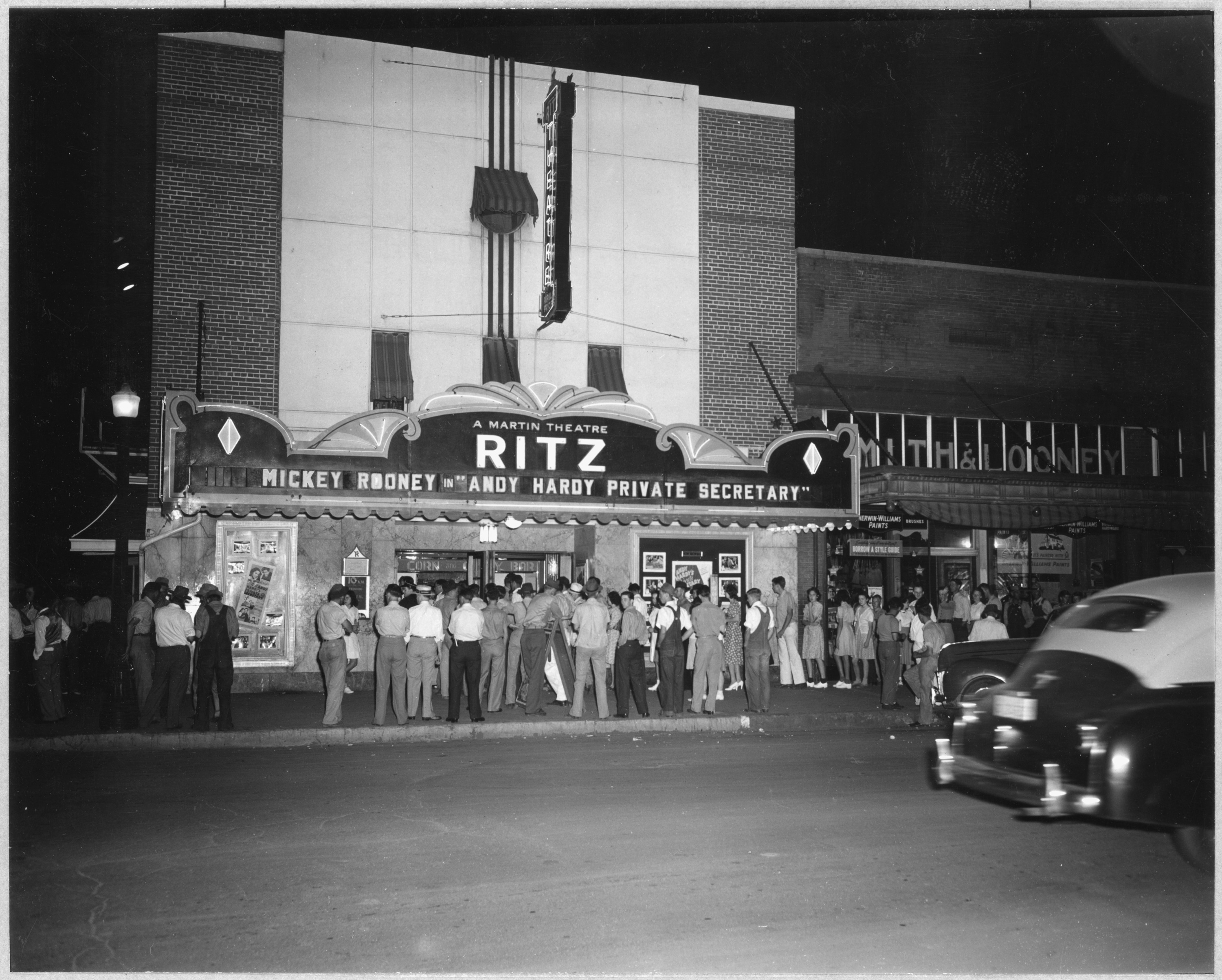
Midnight showing of the film in Alabama

== Cast ==
- Lewis Stone as Judge Hardy
- Mickey Rooney as Andy Hardy
- Fay Holden as Mrs. Hardy
- Ann Rutherford as Polly Benedict
- Sara Haden as Aunt Milly Forrest
- Kathryn Grayson as Kathryn Land
- Ian Hunter as Steven V. Land
- Gene Reynolds as Jimmy McMahon
- George Breakston as "Beezy"
- Todd Karns as Harry Land
- Addison Richards as Mr. Benedict
- Margaret Early as Clarabelle Lee
- Bertha Priestley as Susan Wiley
- Joseph Crehan as Peter Dugan
- Lee Phelps as Barnes
- John Dilson as Mr. Davis
- Charles Smith as Bob (uncredited)

== Reception ==
Andy Hardy's Private Secretary was the tenth most popular film at the US box office in 1941. According to MGM records it earned $1,526,000 in the US and Canada and $876,000 elsewhere resulting in a profit of $1,334,000.

== Music ==
- [0:46] Voices of Spring [Strauss] (sung by Kathryn Grayson)
- [1:26] Graduation March
- [1:27] Ardon gl'incensi (Mad Scene from the opera LUCIA DI LAMMERMOOR by G. Donizetti, sung by Kathryn Grayson)
- [1:31] I've Got My Eyes on You [Porter] (sung by Kathryn Grayson)
