= Love Laughs at Andy Hardy =

1946 film by Willis Goldbeck

- Theatrical release poster
- Directed by: Willis Goldbeck
- Written by: Howard Dimsdale (story); William Ludwig (writer); Aurania Rouverol (characters); Harry Ruskin (writer)
- Produced by: Robert Sisk
- Starring: Mickey Rooney; Lewis Stone; Bonita Granville
- Cinematography: Robert H. Planck
- Edited by: Cotton Warburton
- Music by: David Snell
- Production company: Metro-Goldwyn-Mayer
- Distributed by: Loew's Inc.
- Release date: December 25, 1946
- Running time: 93 minutes 95 minutes (2005 DVD release)
- Country: United States
- Language: English
- Budget: $1,001,000
- Box office: $2,359,000

Love Laughs at Andy Hardy (1946)

Love Laughs at Andy Hardy is a 1946 American comedy film directed by Willis Goldbeck and starring Mickey Rooney, Lewis Stone and Bonita Granville. It was produced by Metro-Goldwyn-Mayer. The film is also known under its American promotional title Uncle Andy Hardy. This was the fifteenth and penultimate film in the Andy Hardy series, and the final film featuring Stone as Judge Hardy. The final installment, Andy Hardy Comes Home (1958), was released 12 years later.

== Plot ==
The story starts in the small town of Carvel, where Judge Hardy and his wife Emily eagerly await their son's return from Army after service of two years. His parents are unaware that Andy is looking to get back with his college sweetheart Kay. Emily's suspicions are soon confirmed when Andy, who usually has had an eye for girls, barely notices the very attractive singer, Isobel Gonzales, when they are introduced.

Isobel is a regular singer at the Carvel country club, and when Andy comes there and they are introduced to each other, she falls in love with him. Andy, however, isn't smitten by Isobel in the same way, still preoccupied with thinking about his college sweetheart. Andy wants to return to Wainright College to finish his studies and meet his sweetheart as soon as possible.

Kay leaves the college for unexplained reasons. His friend Duke understands that Andy is in need of a date at the freshman dance, so he sets up with a girl named Coffy Smith, who is a great deal taller than Andy, making him look ridiculous beside her. Andy is quite embarrassed by their appearance together, but soon warms up to the bigger girl and they become good friends.

Andy is downhearted to learn that Kay is in love with her guardian, Dane Kittridge. At Kay's request, he serves as best man at their wedding.

After the wedding, Andy makes plans to go to South America and become an engineer, abandoning his plan to go to law school and become a lawyer. But Judge Hardy convinces him to go back to Wainwright and complete his studies. As the film ends he becomes reacquainted with Isobel.

== Cast ==
- Mickey Rooney as Andy Hardy
- Lewis Stone as Judge Hardy
- Sara Haden as Aunt Milly
- Bonita Granville as Kay Wilson
- Lina Romay as Isobel Gonzales
- Fay Holden as Mrs. Emily Hardy
- Dorothy Ford as Coffy Smith
- Hal Hackett as Duke Johnson
- Dick Simmons as Dane Kittridge
- Clinton Sundberg as Haberdashery clerk
- Geraldine Wall as Miss Geeves
- Addison Richards as Mr. Benedict

== Production ==
While Mickey Rooney was in the army, MGM announced Booth Tarkington had developed a story for a Hardy movie without Andy, The Hardy Family's Country Cousin. Andy would not appear but would be referenced in conversations. The film was not made.

This was Mickey Rooney's first film after he got out of the army. It was originally entitled Uncle Andy Hardy.

This film was also noteworthy for being the last in the Andy Hardy series to feature veteran character actor Lewis Stone as Judge Hardy. Stone continued his career for the next seven years, appearing in 10 more films until his death in 1953 at age 73.

== Reception ==
New York Times reviewer Bosley Crowther observed that the Hardy character had not changed from his previous appearances, and was "the same beanie-wearing puppy-lover who was having blonde trouble three years ago." Crowther wrote that Rooney "runs the gamut of elaborately low-brown burlesque." Lovers of the series may find "this return of Andy to juvenile pre-eminence to be a most gratifying thing," but that those "hoping for more progress in the educational field," especially for veterans, would find it to be a "letdown of major magnitude."

According to MGM records the film earned $1,656,000 in the US and Canada and $733,000 elsewhere, resulting in a profit to the studio of $529,000.

== Copyright status ==
This movie is in the public domain in the United States as of 1974 because Metro-Goldwyn-Mayer neglected to renew the copyright.

== Comic book adaptation ==
- Fiction House Movie Comics #3 (June 1947)
