= You're Only Young Once =

1937 film by George B. Seitz

- Directed by: George B. Seitz; E. J. Babille (assistant)
- Written by: Aurania Rouverol (characters); Kay Van Riper
- Produced by: Carey Wilson
- Starring: Lewis Stone; Cecilia Parker; Mickey Rooney
- Cinematography: Lester White
- Edited by: Adrienne Fazan
- Music by: David Snell
- Distributed by: Metro-Goldwyn-Mayer
- Release date: 1937
- Running time: 78 minutes
- Country: United States
- Language: English

You're Only Young Once is a 1937 American comedy film directed by George B. Seitz. Following A Family Affair, it is the second film of the Andy Hardy series. Lewis Stone replaces Lionel Barrymore as Judge Hardy while Fay Holden replaced Spring Byington as his wife since both Barrymore and Byington were too expensive for the sequel's modest budget. Mickey Rooney would repeat his role as Andy while Cecilia Parker, as his sister, and Sara Haden, as Aunt Milly, would also reprise their roles from the original film. They were the only original actors transferred to the series.

== Plot ==
The Hardy family goes to Catalina for a two-week vacation, where Judge Hardy tries to catch a swordfish, Marian falls in love with a married lawyer/lifeguard, and Andy goes around with a "sophisticated" girl. They return home to Carvel to find that by having endorsed a note for Frank Redmond, Judge Hardy might lose all their property to Hoyt Wells. Luckily, through an old law that Judge Hardy learned about while fishing with Capt. Swenson, their home is saved and Hoyt Wells is run out of town.

== Cast ==
- Lewis Stone as Judge James K. Hardy
- Cecilia Parker as Marian Hardy
- Mickey Rooney as Andy Hardy
- Fay Holden as Mrs. Emily Hardy
- Frank Craven as Frank Redmond (Carvel newspaper owner)
- Ann Rutherford as Polly Benedict
- Eleanor Lynn as Geraldine 'Jerry' Lane
- Ted Pearson as Bill Rand (lifeguard)
- Sara Haden as Aunt Milly Forrest
- Charles Judels as Capt. Swenson of the Shorty II
- Selmer Jackson as Hoyt Wells (land speculator)
