= My Dear Miss Aldrich =

1937 film by George B. Seitz

- Directed by: George B. Seitz; E. J. Babille (assistant)
- Written by: Herman J. Mankiewicz
- Starring: Maureen O'Sullivan; Walter Pidgeon; Edna May Oliver
- Cinematography: Charles Lawton Jr.
- Edited by: William S. Gray
- Music by: David Snell
- Production company: Metro-Goldwyn-Mayer
- Distributed by: Loew's Inc.
- Release date: September 17, 1937
- Running time: 74 minutes
- Country: United States
- Language: English
- Budget: $216,000
- Box office: $358,000

My Dear Miss Aldrich is a 1937 American comedy drama film directed by George B. Seitz and starring Maureen O'Sullivan, Walter Pidgeon, and Edna May Oliver about a young woman who inherits a New York City newspaper and decides to become a reporter rather than a publisher.

== Plot ==
Martha Aldrich is a young woman from Nebraska who inherits a New York City newspaper from a distant relative. She's accompanied to New York by her aunt, Mrs. Lou Atherton. Editor Ken Morley, whose Globe-Leader newspaper is in hot competition with the Chronicle, refuses to hire a woman as a journalist. But as owner, Aldrich demands to be hired and is. She quickly scoops the male staff on a royal birth. But when she keeps a society friend's wedding a secret, Morley fires her. Determined to win her job back, Aldrich spies on industrialist Talbot and trade union leader Sinclair as they secretly negotiate a new collective bargaining agreement. Believing Aldrich has been kidnapped, Morley and Mrs. Atherton track her down as Mrs. Sinclair tries to foil Aldrich's schemes in order to protect her husband. Aldrich gets her scoop, wins back her job, and marries Morley—who has fallen in love with her.

== Cast ==
- Maureen O'Sullivan as Martha Aldrich
- Walter Pidgeon as Ken Morley
- Edna May Oliver as Mrs. Lou Atherton
- Rita Johnson as Ellen Warfield
- Janet Beecher as Mrs. Sinclair
- Paul Harvey as Mr. Sinclair
- Walter Kingsford as Mr. Talbot

== Production ==
The film was written by Herman J. Mankiewicz. It was one of a number of scripts written by Mankiewicz early in his career which film historian Charles Higham called "hackwork" and "manufactured...written without enthusiasm". The director was George B. Seitz, a director best known for the gentle and bland "Andy Hardy" series of family comedies which starred Mickey Rooney.

== Reception ==
According to MGM records, the movie earned $238,000 in the US and Canada and $120,000 elsewhere, making a $1,000 profit.

The film later aired as a radio play on The MGM Theater of the Air on July 21, 1950, with Donna Reed in the title role.
