= George B. Seitz =

American film director (1888–1944)

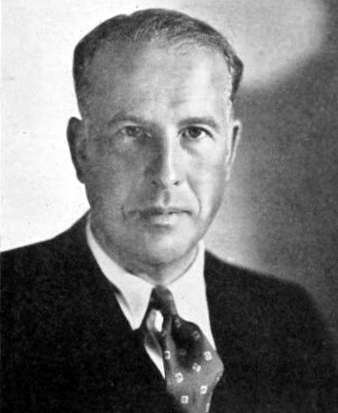
- Seitz circa 1939
- Born: George Brackett Seitz; January 3, 1888; Boston, Massachusetts, U.S.
- Died: July 8, 1944 (aged 56); Hollywood, California, U.S.
- Occupations: Actor, playwright, screenwriter, director
- Years active: 1913–1944

George Brackett Seitz (January 3, 1888 – July 8, 1944) was an American playwright, screenwriter, film actor and director. He was known for his screenplays for action serials, such as The Perils of Pauline (1914) and The Exploits of Elaine (1914). He also directed various Andy Hardy comedy films.

Seitz was born in Boston, Massachusetts, started his career as a playwright, and also wrote some fiction for "up-market" pulp magazines such as Adventure and People's Magazine.

Seitz did much of his early work in Fort Lee, New Jersey when many other early film studios in America's first motion picture industry were based there. He was the director of more than one hundred films, the writer of more than thirty screenplays, and an actor in seven films. He worked at Columbia Pictures and at Metro-Goldwyn-Mayer where he directed eleven films in the Andy Hardy series of the 1930s & 1940s. He died in Hollywood, California in 1944. Although an acquaintance of the cinematographer John F. Seitz, they were not related. He was the father of George B. Seitz Jr., who was a writer/director active in the 1940s and 1950s in films and television.

== Filmography ==
=== Director ===
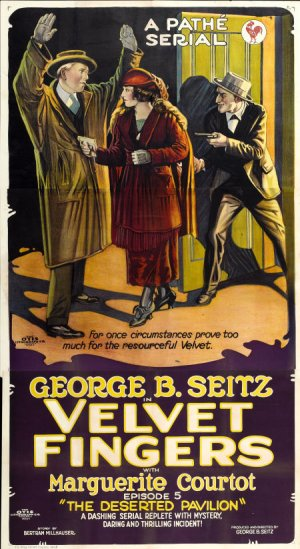
Poster for Velvet Fingers (1920)

- The Exploits of Elaine (1914)
- The Romance of Elaine (1915)
- Nedra (1915) (*; writer)
- The Iron Claw (1916)
- The Fatal Ring (1917)
- The House of Hate (1918)
- The Honest Thief (1918)
- Getaway Kate (1918)
- The Lightning Raider (1919)
- Bound and Gagged (1919)
- The Black Secret (1919)
- Pirate Gold (1920)
- Velvet Fingers (1920)
- Rogues and Romance (1920)
- The Sky Ranger (1921)
- Hurricane Hutch (1921)
- Go Get 'Em Hutch (1922)
- Speed (1922)
- Plunder (1923)
- The Way of a Man (1924)
- Leatherstocking (1924)
- The Fortieth Door (1924)
- Into the Net (1924)
- Galloping Hoofs (1924)
- Sunken Silver (1925)
- Wild Horse Mesa (1925)
- The Vanishing American (1925)
- Desert Gold (1926)
- The Last Frontier (1926)
- The Ice Flood (1926)
- Pals in Paradise (1926)
- Jim, the Conqueror (1926)
- The Blood Ship (1927)
- Great Mail Robbery (1927)
- The Isle of Forgotten Women (1927)
- The Tigress (1927)
- The Warning (1927)
- After the Storm (1928)
- Ransom (1928)
- Beware of Blondes (1928)
- Court-Martial (1928)
- The Circus Kid (1928)
- Blockade (1928)
- Hey Rube! (1928)
- Black Magic (1929)
- Murder on the Roof (1930)
- Guilty? (1930)
- Midnight Mystery (1930)
- Danger Lights (1930)
- The Lion and the Lamb (1931)
- The Drums of Jeopardy (1931)
- Arizona (1931)
- Shanghaied Love (1931)
- Night Beat (1931)
- Sally of the Subway (1932)
- Temptation's Workshop (1932)
- Docks of San Francisco (1932)
- Sin's Pay Day (1932)
- Passport to Paradise (1932)
- The Widow in Scarlet (1932)
- Treason (1933)
- The Thrill Hunter (1933)
- The Women in His Life (1933)
- Lazy River (1934)
- The Fighting Ranger (1934)
- Buried Loot (1935)
- Society Doctor (1935)
- Shadow of Doubt (1935)
- Times Square Lady (1935)
- Calm Yourself (1935)
- Woman Wanted (1935)
- Alibi Racket (1935)
- Desert Death (1935)
- Kind Lady (1935)
- Exclusive Story (1936)
- Absolute Quiet (1936)
- The Three Wise Guys (1936)
- The Last of the Mohicans (1936)
- Tarzan Escapes (1936)
- Mad Holiday (1936)
- Under Cover of Night (1937)
- Mama Steps Out (1937)
- A Family Affair (1937)
- The Thirteenth Chair (1937)
- Between Two Women (1937)
- My Dear Miss Aldrich (1937)
- You're Only Young Once (1937)
- Andy Hardy's Dilemma: A Lesson in Mathematics... and Other Things (1938)
- Judge Hardy's Children (1938)
- Yellow Jack (1938)
- Love Finds Andy Hardy (1938)
- Out West with the Hardys (1938)
- The Hardys Ride High (1939)
- 6,000 Enemies (1939)
- Thunder Afloat (1939)
- Judge Hardy and Son (1939)
- Andy Hardy Meets Debutante (1940)
- Kit Carson (1940)
- Sky Murder (1940)
- Gallant Sons (1940)
- Andy Hardy's Private Secretary (1941)
- Life Begins for Andy Hardy (1941)
- A Yank on the Burma Road (1942)
- The Courtship of Andy Hardy (1942)
- Mister Gardenia Jones (1942)
- Pierre of the Plains (1942)
- Andy Hardy's Double Life (1942)
- Andy Hardy's Blonde Trouble (1944)
