= Kay Van Riper =

American screenwriter

- Born: Catherine Van Riper; November 6, 1908; Winona, Minnesota, US
- Died: December 31, 1948 (aged 40); Glendale, California, US
- Resting place: Forest Lawn Memorial Park
- Occupation: Screenwriter
- Years active: 1937–1946
- Spouses: Russell Lewis; Robert Wrubel

Kay Van Riper (November 6, 1908 – December 31, 1948) was an American screenwriter, actress, and radio personality active during the 1930s and 1940s. Often described as a "tiny blonde," Van Riper won many accolades over the course of her multifaceted career.

== Biography ==
=== Beginnings ===
Kay—the only child of John Van Riper and Amelia Wright—was born in Winona, Minnesota, in 1908; the family would also live in Buffalo, Minnesota, while Van Riper was growing up. After graduating from the University of Minnesota with a degree in education in 1927, she moved to Hollywood in 1929 intending to become a teacher.

=== Radio career ===
Soon after arriving in Hollywood, Van Riper found employment as a secretary at a local radio station, where she met radio personality Tom Breneman. Breneman encouraged her to develop her own projects, and soon Van Riper was writing, producing, and starring in her own hit historical drama, English Coronets. She was also the program director and publicist for KFWB. In 1934, she moved to New York briefly to produce English Coronets for the American Broadcasting Service (which soon folded). She moved back to L.A. in 1935 and continued producing the show for KFWB.

=== Screenwriting career ===
In 1937, she began working for MGM as a scenarist, contributing to the Andy Hardy franchise as well as several of the studio's biggest musicals, from Babes in Arms to Strike Up the Band. She'd later explain that she drew on her memories of growing up in her small Minnesota town to flesh out the Hardy scripts. She also collaborated with Mary C. McCall Jr. on Kathleen, the film that would bring Shirley Temple out of her brief retirement. Eventually she was earning $1,500 a week as part of her contract.

=== Personal life ===
Van Riper rented Rudolph Valentino's former home in Whitley Heights in the 1930s and told a newspaper columnist she had briefly thought it was haunted. While working as a screenwriter, she split her time between Los Angeles and New York.

In 1939, she married choreographer and producer Russell Lewis, who worked in film and also collaborated with Van Riper on her one-act stage plays. The marriage ended in divorce in 1942. She was in the midst of divorcing her second husband, New York–based attorney Robert Wrubel, at the time of her death.

=== Declining health and eventual death ===
According to Van Riper's mother, Amelia, Van Riper had suffered from spinal pain that radiated into her legs for more than 20 years, and by early 1948, it had gotten so bad that Van Riper had to give up her career. She'd seen doctors all over the world, and to no avail.

Van Riper died on New Year's Eve of 1948 after overdosing on sleeping pills in her Glendale, California, home. Her mother, who was living with her at the time, found her body sitting next to her bed. No note was found, but the coroner classified the death as a suicide.

== Selected filmography ==
- Kathleen (1941) (story)
- Lady Be Good (1941)
- Babes in Arms (1939)
- Andy Hardy Gets Spring Fever (1939)
- The Hardys Ride High (1939)
- Blondie Meets the Boss (1939) (story)
- Out West With the Hardys (1938)
- Judge Hardy's Children (1938)
- You're Only Young Once (1937)
- A Family Affair (1937)
