= Andy Hardy's Double Life =

1942 film

- Directed by: George B. Seitz
- Written by: Aurania Rouverol (characters); Agnes Christine Johnston
- Starring: Lewis Stone; Mickey Rooney; Cecilia Parker; Fay Holden
- Cinematography: George J. Folsey
- Edited by: Gene Ruggiero
- Music by: Daniele Amfitheatrof
- Production company: Metro-Goldwyn-Mayer
- Distributed by: Loew's Inc.
- Release date: December 1942
- Running time: 92 minutes
- Country: United States
- Language: English
- Budget: $369,000
- Box office: $2,647,000

Andy Hardy's Double Life is a 1942 comedy film directed by George B. Seitz. It was the thirteenth installment of MGM's enormously popular Andy Hardy film series starring Mickey Rooney as the title character.

It was the feature film debut of Esther Williams. It was the last Hardy film to include the character Polly Benedict, Andy's long-suffering sweetheart, as well as the last to feature Ann Rutherford (who had taken over the role of Polly in the second film of the series).

== Plot ==
Preparing himself for college life, Andy Hardy promises himself to put an end to his flirting ways and attempts to organize his finances by selling his old car. Things become complicated when his love interest Polly introduces him to a seductive psychology student, while his friends continue to delay the payment for his automobile. Andy also tries his best to help his sister Marian with her own relationship problems and takes an interest in assisting his father Judge Hardy with a complicated case involving an injured boy.

== Cast ==
- Lewis Stone as Judge Hardy
- Mickey Rooney as Andy Hardy
- Cecilia Parker as Marian Hardy
- Fay Holden as Mrs. Hardy
- Ann Rutherford as Polly Benedict
- Sara Haden as Aunt Milly Forrest
- Esther Williams as Sheila Brooks
- William Lundigan as Jeff Willis
- Robert Pittard as Botsy
- Bobby Blake as "Tooky" Stedman
- Susan Peters as Sue

== Reception ==
According to MGM records the film earned $1,782,000 in the US and Canada and $865,000 elsewhere, making a profit of $1,499,000.
