= Rouverol =

Rouverol is a surname: Notable people with the surname include:

- Aurania Rouverol (1886–1955), American writer
- Jean Rouverol (1916–2017), American author, actress and screenwriter
