= Judge Hardy's Children =

1938 film by George B. Seitz

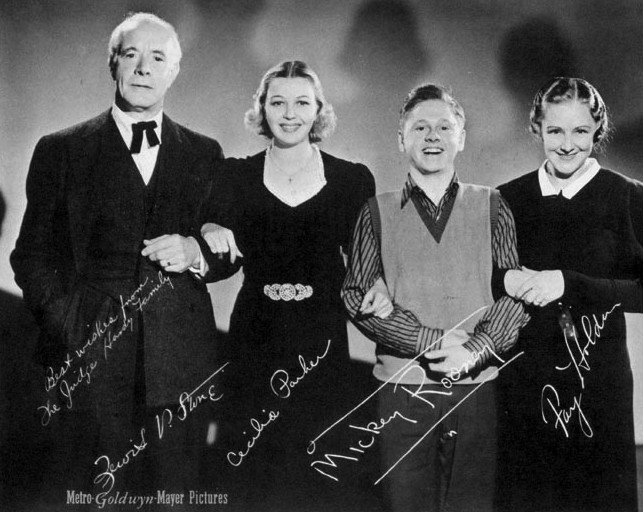
- Photo of the Hardy family from the film
- Directed by: George B. Seitz
- Written by: Aurania Rouverol; Kay Van Riper; Carey Wilson
- Starring: Mickey Rooney; Lewis Stone
- Cinematography: Lester White
- Edited by: Ben Lewis
- Music by: David Snell
- Distributed by: Metro-Goldwyn-Mayer
- Release date: March 26, 1938
- Running time: 78 minutes
- Country: United States
- Language: English

Judge Hardy's Children is a 1938 film in the Andy Hardy series. The plot involves the Hardys visiting Washington, DC, in this third entry in MGM's "Hardy Family" series.

== Plot ==
Judge Hardy has been appointed chairman of a special committee in Washington, DC. The Judge's daughter Marian is intoxicated by Washington's social life, while son Andy falls for a pretty daughter of a French diplomat. Thus, the judge is obliged to juggle his committee duties with his efforts to keep his children from making fools of themselves.

== Cast ==
- Mickey Rooney as Andy Hardy
- Lewis Stone as Judge James K. Hardy
- Fay Holden as Mrs. Emily Hardy
- Cecilia Parker as Marian Hardy
- Betty Ross Clarke as Aunt Millie Forrest
- Ann Rutherford as Polly Benedict
- Robert Whitney as Wayne Trenton
- Jacqueline Laurent as Suzanne Cortot
- Ruth Hussey as Margaret 'Maggie' Lee
- Jonathan Hale as John Lee
- Janet Beecher as Miss Budge, Suzanne's Tutor
- Leonard Penn as Steve Prentiss
- Boyd Crawford as Radio Announcer
