= The Courtship of Andy Hardy =

1942 film by George B. Seitz

- Directed by: George B. Seitz
- Written by: Agnes Christine Johnston; Aurania Rouverol
- Produced by: Carey Wilson
- Starring: Mickey Rooney; Lewis Stone; Donna Reed
- Cinematography: Lester White
- Edited by: Elmo Veron
- Music by: David Snell
- Production company: Metro-Goldwyn-Mayer
- Distributed by: Loew's Inc.
- Release date: March 1942
- Running time: 95 minutes
- Country: United States
- Language: English
- Budget: $338,000
- Box office: $2,409,000

The Courtship of Andy Hardy is a 1942 film, part of the Andy Hardy series. It gave an early role to Donna Reed although Mickey Rooney had lobbied for his then-wife Ava Gardner to have her part. Within a few months of the film's release, she filed for divorce.

This was the 12th entry in the long-running Andy Hardy series of sixteen.

== Plot ==
When Carvel teenager and new tow truck-owner Andy Hardy is stopped by a policeman for driving without a license plate, a radio report implicates him in stealing the car he is towing.

At home, Andy finds it hard to be cheerful, even though his mother Emily, his father, Judge James K. Hardy, and his aunt Milly are celebrating his sister Marian's return from New York. Marian thinks that Carvel is too unsophisticated for her and is annoyed by her family's worries that she is dating Jeff Willis, a local young man who is considered a "wolf."

As the judge sits in his study, Andy comes in and tells him about the misunderstanding that led to the auto theft problem. The judge promises to sort things out if Andy will help him by befriending Melodie Nesbit, a teenager at the center of a custody battle between her mother Olivia and her father Roderick. Although Melodie is not as pretty or outgoing as Andy's other girl friends, he agrees to help by asking her to a dance.

Jeff arrives, announcing his presence on a loudspeaker set up in his car, and broadcasts his invitation to Marian to come with him to the Red Door Inn on the 19th. Andy tells her about the notorious inn and warns her not to get involved in a scandal.

On the night of the dance, Melodie is happy to be there, even though she knows that Andy has only asked her out because of his father. Andy has to bribe his friends to dance with her, but one boy, Harry Land, refuses the money because he has a secret crush on Melodie. After the dance, Melodie, who has a crush on Andy, asks his advice on how to appeal to boys.

The same night, Emily secretly orders a forty dollar cut-away coat for her husband out of her household account.

A few days later, Andy's friend Susie comes to distribute posters for a "spinster skip" dance, to which the girls are to invite the boys. Andy offers to drive Susie around town and is seen by Melodie, who immediately goes to the judge and asks him to say that he accepted her invitation for Andy to come to the dance.

At the same time, the postman arrives with Emily's COD coat and informs her that the amount due is $61.40. Emily is upset because the ad said nothing about extra charges and refuses to accept the package.

On the night of Marian's date with Jeff, she becomes annoyed when her family makes fun of her choice of a dress, which is really a fancy nightgown, and promises that she "will show them."

That night, a man from a collection agency comes to the house and demands that Emily pay the full amount of the coat or be taken to court and have her husband's salary attached.

Later, at the dance, Melodie impresses everyone with her new clothes and hairstyle, and now the boys are willing to pay Andy. Despite Melodie's charm, Andy later admits to her that he does not return her affection. When she quietly goes into her house, she overhears her parents having a vicious argument. Back at home, Andy feels terrible that he made Melodie cry, but is happy to hear that Polly Benedict, his old girlfriend, is coming home. Melodie then comes to the judge and says that she never wants to see either of her parents again and the judge lets her spend the night with his family.

Some time later, Andy, who volunteered to search for the long-overdue Marian, brings her home, towing Jeff's car, in which a drunken Jeff had a minor crash. After they bring the passed-out Jeff into the house, the judge explains to Andy how low man falls when he allows himself to reach this state. The next day, a sober Jeff comes to the door to apologize and say that he did hear the judge's words the previous night and has learned his lesson.

That afternoon, the judge meets with Melodie's parents, and after lecturing them about their behavior, asks Melodie in and convinces Olivia and Roderick to retract the horrible things they have said about each other and try to get along.

After the family leaves, a tearful Emily comes to her husband, remorseful over what has happened about the cut-away coat. The judge alleviates her fears by letting her know that he inadvertently found out about the agency and discovered that the entire mail-order business was run by confidence men who tricked unsuspecting customers into paying more than the advertised price for the suit.

That afternoon, Andy takes Harry to see Melodie, who has gotten over her crush on Andy and is more than willing to date the smitten Harry. She also convinces Andy to ask Polly to the football dance. As Andy leaves Melodie's house, Polly drives by with her cousin, who coincidentally is the man who mistakenly thought that Andy stole his car. With everything now fine, Andy drives home and tells his father, "women are habit forming."

== Cast ==
- Lewis Stone as Judge James K. Hardy
- Mickey Rooney as Andrew 'Andy' Hardy
- Cecilia Parker as Marian Hardy
- Fay Holden as Mrs. Emily Hardy
- Ann Rutherford as Polly Benedict
- Sara Haden as Aunt Milly Forrest
- Donna Reed as Melodie Eunice Nesbit
- William Lundigan as Jefferson 'Jeff' Willis
- Frieda Inescort as Olivia Nesbit
- Harvey Stephens as Roderick O. Nesbit
- Joseph Crehan as Peter Dugan
- George P. Breakston as Beezy
- Todd Karns as Harry Land
- Barbara Bedford as Elsa, Nesbit's Maid
- Lois Collier as Cynthia, Girl at the Dance
- Tim Ryan as Police Officer Farrell

== Reception ==
=== Box Office ===
The film made $1,551,000 in the US and Canada and $858,000 elsewhere during its initial theatrical release, making MGM a profit of $1,319,000.
