= Andy Hardy Gets Spring Fever =

1939 film by W. S. Van Dyke

- Directed by: W. S. Van Dyke
- Written by: Aurania Rouverol (characters); Kay Van Riper (screenplay)
- Produced by: Lou L. Ostrow
- Starring: Lewis Stone; Mickey Rooney; Cecilia Parker; Fay Holden
- Cinematography: Lester White
- Edited by: Ben Lewis
- Music by: David Snell; Edward Ward
- Production company: Metro-Goldwyn-Mayer
- Distributed by: Loew's Inc.
- Release date: July 21, 1939
- Running time: 85 minutes
- Country: United States
- Language: English

Andy Hardy Gets Spring Fever is a 1939 American romantic comedy film directed by W. S. Van Dyke. The plot is about Andy Hardy having a crush on his high school drama teacher, Miss Rose Meredith. It is the seventh of sixteen Andy Hardy films starring Mickey Rooney.

== Plot ==
Andy Hardy is upset that his girlfriend, Polly Benedict, has fallen for Lieutenant Charles Copley. Soon, however, Andy develops a crush on his drama teacher, Rose Meredith. After Andy's play is chosen for the school's annual production, he seizes the opportunity to spend time with his spring time crush. Andy's dad, Judge Hardy, knows that his son is destined for heartache, so he talks to the teacher about it. Then, he decides to let Andy and Rose navigate the ups and downs of young love by themselves.

== Cast ==
- Lewis Stone as Judge James K. 'Jim' Hardy
- Mickey Rooney as Andy Hardy
- Cecilia Parker as Marian Hardy
- Fay Holden as Mrs. Emily 'Emmy' Hardy
- Ann Rutherford as Polly Benedict
- Sara Haden as Aunt Milly Forrest
- Helen Gilbert as Miss Rose Meredith
- Terry Kilburn as Harmon 'Stickin Plaster' Higginbotham Jr.
- John T. Murray as Don David
- George P. Breakston as 'Beezy' Anderson
- Robert Kent as Lieutenant Copley
