= Judge Hardy and Son =

1939 film

- Directed by: George B. Seitz
- Written by: Aurania Rouverol; Carey Wilson
- Produced by: Lou L. Ostrow
- Starring: Lewis Stone; Mickey Rooney; Cecilia Parker; Fay Holden
- Cinematography: Lester White
- Edited by: Ben Lewis
- Music by: David Snell
- Distributed by: Metro-Goldwyn-Mayer
- Release date: December 22, 1939
- Running time: 90 minutes
- Country: United States
- Language: English

Judge Hardy and Son (1939) is the 8th film, of 16, in the Andy Hardy series. It is the last MGM film in the 1930s.

== Plot ==
The Volduzzis, a poor immigrant couple, consult Judge James Hardy when they are threatened with eviction. Judge Hardy believes their estranged daughter, who is married and uses her maiden name as a middle name, may be able to help them financially.

The judge’s son, Andy, has his own money problems: he needs new tires for his car. After settling a debt to a friend, he borrows money from his sister, Marian. Most of the money goes to buying tickets to take his girlfriend, Polly, to a Fourth of July fireworks show.

Judge Hardy tells Andy about his unsuccessful search for the missing Volduzzi girl. Andy asks for an advance on his allowance, but the judge tells him he’s seven weeks overdrawn. Andy offers to assist with the search for pay. He resolves to interview every wealthy girl in school with the middle initial “V”.

One of his tires bursts, and Andy conducts his search door-to-door on foot in the summer heat without success. Stopping at Polly’s house, she tries to waylay him romantically but he is focused on visiting L.V. Horton, who lives nearby.

The spoiled Miss Horton, who says her name is Elvie, not L.V., has a pool and her own soda fountain. Her mother hides the fact that Elvie is an 18-year-old high school freshman. Elvie is working on an essay contest about Alexander Hamilton for a $50 reward. Andy thinks the contest is the answer to his problems. He borrows a book from his father for research. The judge tries to tell him the cash reward is only for female entrants, but Andy is off running up credit in anticipation of the reward: flowers for Polly, new tires and tubes, and a new tuxedo.

Mrs. Hardy and Marian were planning a vacation without the menfolk, but Emily suddenly feels ill and Marian goes without her.

Learning the truth about the contest, Andy tries to enlist the next classmate on his list, Euphrasia Clark, in an unethical scheme: Andy will write a winning essay, Euphrasia will present it as her own, and they’ll split the prize. “Phrasie Daisy”, who has had a crush on “Andy Dandy” for some time, is compliant. When her father later finds out, he forbids her involvement. She then threatens to inform Judge Hardy, to blackmail Andy into taking her to the fireworks show instead of Polly.

Andy attempts a similar scheme with the next girl on the list, Clarabelle Lee, recently from the Deep South. He convinces her that seeming very intelligent by winning the contest will make her popular with boys. For the cash prize, he will write the essay and she will gain social status. She agrees, but insists on rewriting the essay to be about Robert E. Lee, which would disqualify their entry.

Emily contracts pneumonia. Judge Hardy spends a night in prayer, but her condition worsens. He sends Andy out in a driving rain to fetch Marian. Rising rivers prevent their return. After identifying themselves and explaining their situation, a sympathetic police officer gets them across and loans them his car. After more prayer and a heart-to-heart talk between the normally squabbling Marian and Andy, Emily makes substantial improvement.

Andy tries the scheme with Elvie, but finds her in tears after a fight with her mother. Elvie confesses her name really is L.V.: Leonora Volduzzi Brock. Her mother is the girl they’re looking for.

Judge Hardy confronts Mrs. Horton, who pretends he’s asking for a charitable donation for the Volduzzis. He convinces her that it’s her duty to take care of her parents. She breaks down and confesses she was in dire straits after her first husband died. She passed herself and Elvie off as much younger than they were in order to win a new husband, and she feared rejection if she revealed her family background. She tells Elvie that the charade has ended and they don’t have to live a lie anymore.

Afterward, Andy presents his situation to his father. In doing so, he realizes he’s defanged Euphrasia’s threat. Judge Hardy offers to pay Andy’s debts except those pertaining to the car. He won’t loan Andy a car to take Polly to the fireworks; they will have to take the bus.

Polly confronts Andy about having two dates for the show, but tells him she put Euphrasia in her place. Elvie arrives, looking every bit the adult she was pretending not to be. She takes Andy away in private and offers him $100 for changing her life. He refuses it, as it would seem “unmanly”. She kisses him and asks if there is anything else he wants. He asks to borrow her car to take Polly to the show.

== Cast ==
- Lewis Stone as Judge James K. Hardy
- Mickey Rooney as Andy Hardy
- Cecilia Parker as Marian Hardy
- Fay Holden as Mrs. Emily Hardy
- Ann Rutherford as Polly Benedict
- Sara Haden as Aunt Mildred 'Millie' Forrest
- June Preisser as Euphrasia 'Phrasie Daisy' V. Clark
- Maria Ouspenskaya as Mrs. Judith Volduzzi
- Henry Hull as Dr. Jones
- Martha O'Driscoll as Leonora 'Elvie' V. Horton
- Leona Maricle as Mrs. Maria Horton
- Margaret Early as Clarabelle V. Lee
- George Breakston as 'Beezy' Anderson
- Egon Brecher as Mr. Anton Volduzzi
- Edna Holland as Nurse Trowbridge
- Marie Blake as Augusta McBride
