= Calm Yourself =

1935 film by George B. Seitz

- Film poster
- Directed by: George B. Seitz
- Screenplay by: Arthur Kober
- Based on: Calm Yourself! 1934 novel by Edward Hope
- Produced by: Lucien Hubbard
- Starring: Robert Young; Madge Evans; Betty Furness; Ralph Morgan; Nat Pendleton; Hardie Albright
- Cinematography: Lester White
- Edited by: Conrad A. Nervig
- Music by: Charles Maxwell
- Production company: Metro-Goldwyn-Mayer
- Distributed by: Metro-Goldwyn-Mayer
- Release date: June 28, 1935
- Running time: 70 minutes
- Country: United States
- Language: English

Calm Yourself is a 1935 American comedy film directed by George B. Seitz and written by Arthur Kober. The film stars Robert Young, Madge Evans, Betty Furness, Ralph Morgan, Nat Pendleton and Hardie Albright. The film was released on June 28, 1935, by Metro-Goldwyn-Mayer.

== Plot ==
Advertising executive Preston 'Pat' Patton is fired from his job by Col. Allenby when Allenby catches Patton and Allenby's daughter, Mary Elizabeth, kissing. Pat keeps telling the frenzied Allenby, “Calm yourself!” and is inspired to create Confidential Services Incorporated, supposedly founded in 1908, a business that undertakes every kind of difficult task so that his clients may calm themselves. Pat is the only employee, and must pretend to be a female secretary on the phone, but he manages to deluge the city with letters advertising his services. On his first assignment, Pat gets off on the wrong track by delivering the wrong drunk to a wife's bed.

Then, prominent banker Kenneth Rockwell summons Pat to his office. Rockwell is well aware of Pat's deceits, but he likes the letter and thinks Pat can help him.

When Rockwell and his first wife were divorced, almost 20 years ago, she took their three-month-old daughter, Rosalind, to California. He has recently married a woman who is much younger than him. He did not conceal the first marriage, but he never mentioned dates, the child, or his own age. He has just received a wire from Rosalind announcing her arrival on the afternoon train. He hires Pat to keep Rosalind away until he can sound out his new wife.

Pat meets Rosalind at the train and tells her that her father is ready to ship her back to California. When she asks about her father, he describes the ill-tempered Col. Allenby, takes her to Allenby's building at 6 p.m., just as he is coming out, and provokes a heated quarrel with Allenby on the street by telling him that he and Allenby's daughter, Mary Elizabeth, are engaged. Witnessing but not overhearing the argument from the car, Rosalind loses all interest in her father. She has only $25 and wants to stay in New York, so Pat persuades her to be his secretary. Mary Elizabeth is jealous, and they quarrel when he refuses to fire Rosalind.

They all become involved in a complex comic misadventure that includes a baby, a Great Dane, and the police. In the end, Rosalind and her father meet at last, and she is very relieved that he is not Allenby. It turns out that his wife knew his age, but not that he had a daughter. Rockwell is about to introduce them, but Rosalind and Pat are deep in a kiss. When Pat declares they are going to be married, Rosalind protests, weakly. "Calm yourself!" he replies, and they embrace.

== Cast ==
- Robert Young as Preston 'Pat' Patton
- Madge Evans as Rosalind Rockwell
- Betty Furness as Mary Elizabeth Allenby
- Ralph Morgan as Mr. Kenneth S. Rockwell
- Nat Pendleton as Knuckles Benedict
- Hardie Albright as Bobby Kent
- Claude Gillingwater as Col. Allenby
- Shirley Ross as Mrs. Ruth Rockwell
- Raymond Hatton as Mike
- Herman Bing as Mr. Sam Bromberg
- Paul Hurst as Detective Roscoe
- Shirley Chambers as Joan Vincent
- Hale Hamilton as Mr. M.B. Kent
- Isabelle Keith as Mrs. Gloria Lansell
- Clyde Cook as Joe
- Richard Tucker as Police Inspector
- Ivan Miller as Police lieutenant
- Charles Trowbridge as Mr. Lansell
- Tempe Pigott as Anne 'Annie'
- Adrian Morris as Dutch – Gangster
