= A Family Affair (1937 film) =

1937 film by George B. Seitz

- Film Poster
- Directed by: George B. Seitz
- Written by: Kay Van Riper; Hugo Butler
- Based on: Skidding; 1928 play by Aurania Rouverol
- Produced by: Lucien Hubbard; Samuel Marx
- Starring: Lionel Barrymore; Cecilia Parker; Spring Byington; Eric Linden; Charley Grapewin; Mickey Rooney
- Cinematography: Lester White
- Edited by: George Boemler
- Music by: David Snell
- Distributed by: Metro-Goldwyn-Mayer
- Release date: March 12, 1937
- Running time: 69 minutes
- Country: United States
- Language: English
- Budget: $178,000
- Box office: $502,000

A Family Affair is a 1937 American comedy film directed by George B. Seitz and based on the 1928 play Skidding by Aurania Rouverol. It is the first of 16 films now known as the Andy Hardy series, although Andy Hardy did not become the main character in the series until several more installments had been made. The film stars Lionel Barrymore, Cecilia Parker, Eric Linden, Mickey Rooney and Charley Grapewin.

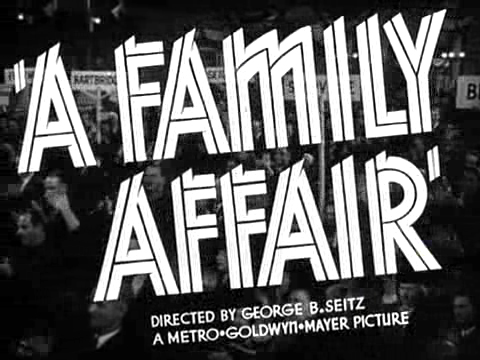
Trailer Title Card

== Plot ==
Judge James K. Hardy hopes to be reelected, but his campaign is placed in jeopardy by his opposition to a wasteful public-works program. Hardy and his family—wife Emily, adult daughters Joan and Marion and teenage son Andy—live in Carvel, a small Midwestern American town.

Spurned contractor Hoyt Wells and newspaper publisher Frank Redmond swear to block Hardy's campaign. Frank agrees to use his paper, The Carvel Star, to publish disparaging stories about the family.

Judge Hardy's daughter Marion returns home from college. Older daughter Joan Hardy Martin also moves into the house after a secret separation from her husband Bill. The family throws a party for Marion, where they are warned by a Carvel Star gossip columnist that only negative stories will be published about the family. Later that night, teenager Andy Hardy takes his childhood sweetheart Polly, now a beautiful woman, to a party. Marion has found love with Wayne Trent, an engineer who is in town to work on the aqueduct. Facing the possibility that her boyfriend may lose his job, she questions her father's decision to block the construction.

Joan confesses to her father that she and Bill are separated after she had gone to a roadhouse with another man. Although the encounter was innocent, Bill was enraged, and they soon separated.

The Carvel Star publishes an article stating that citizens are calling for Judge Hardy's impeachment. He attempts to bring charges against the newspaper.

== Cast ==
- Lionel Barrymore as Judge James K. Hardy
- Cecilia Parker as Marian Hardy
- Eric Linden as Wayne Trent III
- Mickey Rooney as Andy Hardy
- Charley Grapewin as Frank Redmond
- Spring Byington as Mrs. Emily Hardy
- Julie Haydon as Joan Hardy Martin
- Sara Haden as Aunt Milly Forrest
- Allen Vincent as William Booth Martin
- Margaret Marquis as Polly Benedict
- Selmer Jackson as Hoyt Wells

== Production ==
A Family Affair is based on the play Skidding by Aurania Rouverol, although the screenplay differs significantly from the original play. The film was produced in the wake of the success of Ah, Wilderness! (1936), which features many of the same cast.

== Reception ==
In a contemporary review for The New York Times, critic Frank S. Nugent wrote: "Mr. Barrymore knows how to handle these things, and so do the other members of the cast. ... They all have taken their 'Family Affair' rather seriously and, although it was not that important, we rather enjoyed our eavesdropping ping at Judge Hardy's home."

The film realized a profit of $153,000.

== See also ==
- Lionel Barrymore filmography
