= Under Cover of Night =

1937 film

- Theatrical release poster
- Directed by: George B. Seitz
- Screenplay by: Bertram Millhauser
- Story by: Bertram Millhauser
- Produced by: Lucien Hubbard; Ned Marin
- Starring: Edmund Lowe; Florence Rice; Nat Pendleton; Henry Daniell; Sara Haden; Dean Jagger
- Cinematography: Charles G. Clarke
- Edited by: Ben Lewis
- Music by: William Axt
- Production company: Metro-Goldwyn-Mayer
- Distributed by: Loew's Inc.
- Release date: January 8, 1937
- Running time: 71 minutes
- Country: United States
- Language: English

Under Cover of Night is a 1937 American mystery action film directed by George B. Seitz, written by Bertram Millhauser, and starring Edmund Lowe, Florence Rice, Nat Pendleton, Henry Daniell, Sara Haden and Dean Jagger. It was released on January 8, 1937, by Metro-Goldwyn-Mayer.

== Plot ==
A professor, Janet Griswald (Sara Haden), is about to announce a great discovery in physics when her jealous husband (Henry Daniell), who collaborated with her, causes her to have a heart attack by throwing her dog out a window. To cover up his heinous deed, he throws a ball the dog was playing with out the window also to make it seem the dog chased after it.

When he can't find her notebook containing the discovery details, he ends up killing several other people. Detective Cross (Edmund Lowe) solves what might have been a perfect crime when he realizes the dog was thrown out the window before the ball.

== Cast ==
- Edmund Lowe as Christopher Cross
- Florence Rice as Deb
- Nat Pendleton as Sergeant Lucks
- Henry Daniell as Marvin Griswald
- Sara Haden as Janet Griswald
- Dean Jagger as Alan
- Frank Reicher as Rudolph Brehmer
- Zeffie Tilbury as Mrs. Nash
- Henry Kolker as District Attorney Prichard
- Marla Shelton as Tonya Van Horne
- Theodore von Eltz as John Lamont
- Dorothy Peterson as Susan
- Harry Davenport as Dr. Reed
- Larry Steers as Factually Member (uncredited)
