= Sara Haden =

American actress (1898–1981)

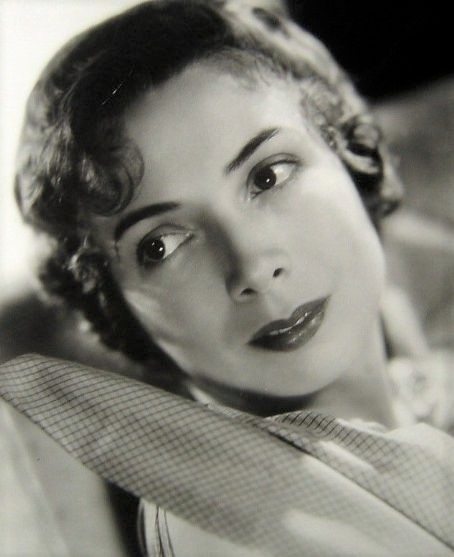
- Haden in 1940
- Born: Catherine Haden; November 17, 1898; Center Point, Texas or Galveston, Texas, U.S.
- Died: September 15, 1981 (aged 82); Woodland Hills, California, U.S.
- Occupation: Actress
- Years active: 1920–1964
- Spouse: Richard Abbott (m. 1921; div. 1948)
- Mother: Charlotte Walker

Sara Haden (born Catherine Haden, November 17, 1898 – September 15, 1981) was an American actress of the 1930s through the 1950s and in television into the mid-1960s. She may be best remembered for appearing as Aunt Milly Forrest in 14 of the 16 entries in the Metro-Goldwyn-Mayer Andy Hardy film series.

== Early life ==
Some sources say she was born in 1898 in Center Point, Texas, (Note: Axel Nissen's Accustomed to Her Face: Thirty-Five Character Actresses of Golden Age Hollywood gives her birthplace as Center Point, Texas.) while others claim she was born in Galveston, Texas. Her father was John B. Haden, a doctor, and her mother was actress Charlotte Walker. She had a sister. She spent "a considerable portion of her childhood" in Williamstown, Massachusetts. When she was a child, her mother gave her training in acting.

== Career ==
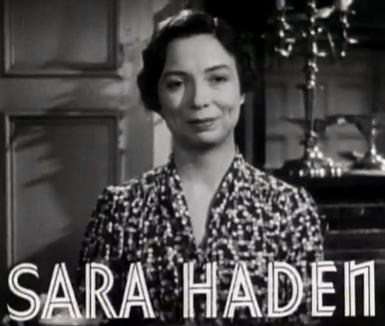
In A Family Affair

Haden first appeared on the stage as a maid in a play that starred her mother and was written by her then-stepfather, Eugene Walter. As early as October 1920, she was appearing with Walter Hampden's acting troupe. She performed in stock theater for several years before she began acting on Broadway. Her Broadway theatre debut came in Trigger (1927) or in Macbeth (1921). Her other Broadway credits included Lawful Larceny (1922), Out of Step (1925), The Wrecker (1928), Girl Trouble (1928), Hot Water (1929), First Mortgage (1929), and The Hill Between Us (1938).

A part in the play Sunup took Haden to London in the 1920s. It ran for 32 weeks, and the cast gave a command performance for King George and Queen Mary. A review in The Theatre World and Illustrated Stage Review said of Haden's performance, "Without any great help from the playwright or from her own personality, this young actress gives us a performance which for depth and purity of feeling has no parallel in my memory since Marie Lohr played Marguerite in Faust some seventeen years ago."

She made her film debut in 1934 (one year after her mother's retirement) in the Katharine Hepburn vehicle Spitfire. Haden later became a Metro-Goldwyn-Mayer contract player in the late 1930s and generally appeared in small roles in many of the studio's films, most notably in the Andy Hardy series starring Mickey Rooney, cast as the spinsterish Aunt Milly Forrest.

Haden made her last film, Andy Hardy Comes Home, in 1958, but was active on television until a 1965 guest spot on Dr. Kildare. She was most notable for her stern, humorless characterisations such as a truant officer in Shirley Temple's Captain January (1936), but she also played the much-loved teacher Miss Pipps, who is unjustly fired in the Our Gang comedy Come Back, Miss Pipps (1941). Other films in which she appeared include Poor Little Rich Girl (1936), The Shop Around the Corner (1940), Woman of the Year (1942), and The Bishop's Wife (1947). Her television appearances include episodes of Climax!, Bourbon Street Beat, and Bonanza. She had a guest appearance on Perry Mason as Florence Harvey in the 1959 episode, "The Case of the Romantic Rogue".

Haden played Dora Darling in My Favorite Martian, season 2 episode 28, "Once Upon a Martian's Mother's Day" in 1965.

== Personal life ==
Haden was married to film actor Richard Abbott (born Seamon Vandenberg) from 1921 until their divorce in 1948. She died on September 15, 1981, at the Motion Picture & Television Country House and Hospital in Woodland Hills, California, at age 82.

== Selected filmography ==
- The Life of Vergie Winters (1934) as Winnie Belle
- Music in the Air (1934) as Martha
- Anne of Green Gables (1934) as Mrs. Barry
- The White Parade (1934) as Miss Harrington
- The Fountain (1934) as Susie
- Hat, Coat, and Glove (1934) as The Secretary
- Finishing School (1934) as Miss Fisher - Teacher
- Affairs of a Gentleman (1934) as Frances Bennett - Grisham's secretary
- Spitfire (1934) as Etta Dawson
- Black Fury (1935) as Sophie Shemanski
- Magnificent Obsession (1935) as Mrs. Nancy Ashford
- Way Down East (1935) as Cordelia Peabody
- O'Shaughnessy's Boy (1935) as Aunt Martha Shields
- Mad Love (1935) as Marie
- Reunion (1936) as Ellie
- Laughing at Trouble (1936) as Mrs. Jennie Nevins
- Can This Be Dixie? (1936) as Miss Beauregard
- Poor Little Rich Girl (1936) as Collins
- Little Miss Nobody (1936) as Teresa Lewis
- Half Angel (1936) as Henrietta Hargraves
- Captain January (1936) as Agatha Morgan
- Everybody's Old Man (1936) as Susan Franklin
- The Crime of Dr. Forbes (1936) as Dr. Anna Burkhart
- Under Cover of Night (1937) as Janet Griswald
- A Family Affair (1937) as Aunt Milly Forrest
- You're Only Young Once (1937) as Aunt Milly Forrest
- First Lady (1937) as Mrs. Mason
- The Barrier (1937) as Mrs. John "Allunia" Gale
- The Last of Mrs. Cheyney (1937) as Anna
- Out West with the Hardys (1938) as Aunt Milly Forrest
- Judge Hardy and Son (1939) as Aunt Milly Forrest
- Remember? (1939) as Miss Wilson
- The Secret of Dr. Kildare (1939) as Nora
- Andy Hardy Gets Spring Fever (1939) as Aunt Milly Forrest
- Tell No Tales (1939) as Miss Bennett
- The Hardys Ride High (1939) as Aunt Milly Forrest
- Four Girls in White (1939) as Miss Bennett
- The Shop Around the Corner (1940) as Flora Kaczek
- Boom Town (1940) as Miss Barnes
- Hullabaloo (1940) as "Sue" Merriweather
- Keeping Company (1940) as Mrs. Forrest
- Andy Hardy Meets Debutante (1940) as Aunt Milly Forrest
- H. M. Pulham, Esq. (1941) as Miss Rollo - Harry's secretary
- Come Back, Miss Pipps (1941 - Our Gang short) as Miss Pipps
- Life Begins for Andy Hardy (1941) as Aunt Milly Forrest
- Love Crazy (1941) as Cecila Landis
- Washington Melodrama (1941) as Mrs. Harrington
- Barnacle Bill (1941) as Aunt Letty
- Andy Hardy's Private Secretary (1941) as Aunt Milly Forrest
- The Trial of Mary Dugan (1941) as Miss Mathews
- Andy Hardy's Double Life (1942) as Aunt Milly Forrest
- Somewhere I'll Find You (1942) as Miss Coultier
- The Affairs of Martha (1942) as Mrs. Justin I. Peacock
- The Courtship of Andy Hardy (1942) as Aunt Milly Forrest
- Woman of the Year (1942) as Matron
- Thousands Cheer (1943) as Second Nurse
- Best Foot Forward (1943) as Miss Talbert
- Pilot No. 5 (1943) as Landlady
- Above Suspecion (1943) as Aunt Hattie
- The Youngest Profession (1943) as Sister Lassie
- Lost Angel (1943) as Rhoda Kitterick
- Broadway Rhythm (1944) as Miss Wynn
- Andy Hardy's Blonde Trouble (1944) as Aunt Milly Forrest
- She Wouldn't Say Yes (1945) as Laura Pitts
- Our Vines Have Tender Grapes (1945) as Mrs. Bjorn Bjornson
- Love Laughs at Andy Hardy (1946) as Aunt Milly Forrest
- Mr. Ace (1946) as Alma Rhodes
- Our Hearts Were Growing Up (1946) as Miss Dill
- Bad Bascomb (1946) as Tillie Lovejoy
- She-Wolf of London (1946) as Martha Winthrop
- The Bishop's Wife (1947) as Mildred Cassaway
- Rachel and the Stranger (1948) as Mrs. Jackson
- Roughshod (1949) as Ma Wyatt
- The Big Cat (1949) as Mrs. Mary Cooper
- A Life of Her Own (1950) as Smitty
- The Great Rupert (1950) as Mrs. Katie Dingle
- Wagons West (1952) as Elizabeth Cook
- Rodeo (1952) as Agatha Cartwright
- A Lion Is in the Streets (1953) as Lula May McManamee
- The Outlaw's Daughter (1954) as Mrs. Merril
- Betrayed Women (1955) as Head Guard Darcy
- Andy Hardy Comes Home (1958) as Aunt Milly Forest
