= Woman Wanted (1935 film) =

1935 film by George B. Seitz

- Theatrical release poster
- Directed by: George B. Seitz
- Screenplay by: Leonard Fields; David Silverstein; Otis Garrett
- Based on: Get That Girl by Wilson Collison
- Produced by: Phil Goldstone
- Starring: Maureen O'Sullivan; Joel McCrea
- Cinematography: Charles G. Clarke
- Edited by: Ben Lewis
- Music by: William Axt
- Production company: Metro-Goldwyn-Mayer
- Distributed by: Loew's Inc.
- Release date: August 2, 1935 (US)
- Running time: 67 minutes
- Country: United States
- Language: English

Woman Wanted is a 1935 American crime drama film directed by George B. Seitz and starring Maureen O'Sullivan and Joel McCrea. Written by Leonard Fields and David Silverstein, the film is about a woman wrongly convicted of murder who escapes with the help of a young lawyer who hides her from the police and the mobsters who set her up.

== Plot ==
The plot follows Ann Gray, a woman wrongfully convicted of murder. After escaping from a prison transport, she becomes a fugitive, determined to prove her innocence.

While on the run, Ann meets Tony Baxter, a young attorney who eventually becomes entangled in her plight. Tony harbours Ann in his apartment, hiding her from the authorities while they work together to uncover the truth behind the murder she was framed for. As they gather evidence and grow closer, they face increasing pressure from law enforcement and the real criminals involved in the case.

At the film's conclusion, after Ann's name is finally cleared, she and Tony exchange heartfelt words of gratitude and admiration, reflecting on their journey and hinting at the deep bond they've formed through the ordeal. The film blends elements of romance, suspense, and courtroom drama as Ann and Tony race against time to clear her name.

== Cast ==
- Maureen O'Sullivan as Ann Gray
- Joel McCrea as Tony Baxter
- Lewis Stone as District Attorney Martin
- Louis Calhern as Smiley Gordon
- Edgar Kennedy as Sweeney
- Adrienne Ames as Betty Randolph
- Robert Greig as Peedles
- Noel Madison as Joe Metz
- William B. Davidson as Collins
- Richard Powell as Lee
- Erville Alderson as Constable
- Gertrude Short as Gertie
