= Society Doctor =

1935 film

- Directed by: George B. Seitz
- Written by: Michael Fessier; Laurence Stallings; Samuel Marx
- Produced by: Lucien Hubbard
- Starring: Robert Taylor; Chester Morris; Virginia Bruce
- Cinematography: Lester White
- Edited by: Ben Lewis
- Music by: Oscar Radin
- Production company: Metro-Goldwyn-Mayer
- Distributed by: Metro-Goldwyn-Mayer
- Release date: January 25, 1935
- Running time: 67 minutes
- Country: United States
- Language: English
- Budget: $153,000
- Box office: $534,000

Society Doctor is a 1935 American drama film directed by George B. Seitz and starring Robert Taylor, Chester Morris, and Virginia Bruce. It was produced and distributed by Metro-Goldwyn-Mayer. It was inspired by an unproduced play by Theodore Reeves.

== Plot ==
In a hospital two doctors compete romantically for their colleague Madge Wilson, a nurse. When Doctor Morgan them is fired for taking an ethical stand in conflict yo his superior's tendency to indulge his wealthy clients, he decides to accept an offer to set up a private practice catering to high society. This offends Madge who sees him as being motivated by greed rather than principle and agrees to marry his friend Doctor Ellis even though she is in love with Morgan.

== Reception ==
According to MGM records the film earned $331,000 in the US and Canada and $203,000 elsewhere, making a profit of $187,000.

== Cast ==
- Chester Morris as Dr. Bill Morgan
- Robert Taylor as Dr. Tommy 'Sprout' Ellis
- Virginia Bruce as Madge Wilson
- Billie Burke as Mrs. Crane
- Raymond Walburn as Dr. Horace Waverly
- Henry Kolker as Dr. Harvey
- Dorothy Peterson as Mrs. Kate Harrigan
- William Henry as Frank Snowden
- Mary Jo Mathews as Mary Roberts
- Robert McWade as Harris Snowden
- Donald Meek as Moxley
- Louise Henry as Telephone Operator Gail
- Johnny Hines as Hardy
- Addison Richards as Pete Harrigan
- Bobby Watson as Albright
- Arthur Vinton as Butch McCarthy
- James Flavin as Detective Ewing
- Wade Boteler as Detective Grady
- Eulalie Jensen as Mother McCarthy
- Heinie Conklin as Oscar Horsemeyer
- Inez Palange as Mrs. Esposito
- Richard Tucker as McKenzie
- Libby Taylor as Mercedes, Mrs. Crane's Maid
- Isabelle Keith as Nurse
- Lee Shumway as Doctor
- Jean Chatburn as Receptionist
