= Lewis Stone =

American actor (1879–1953)

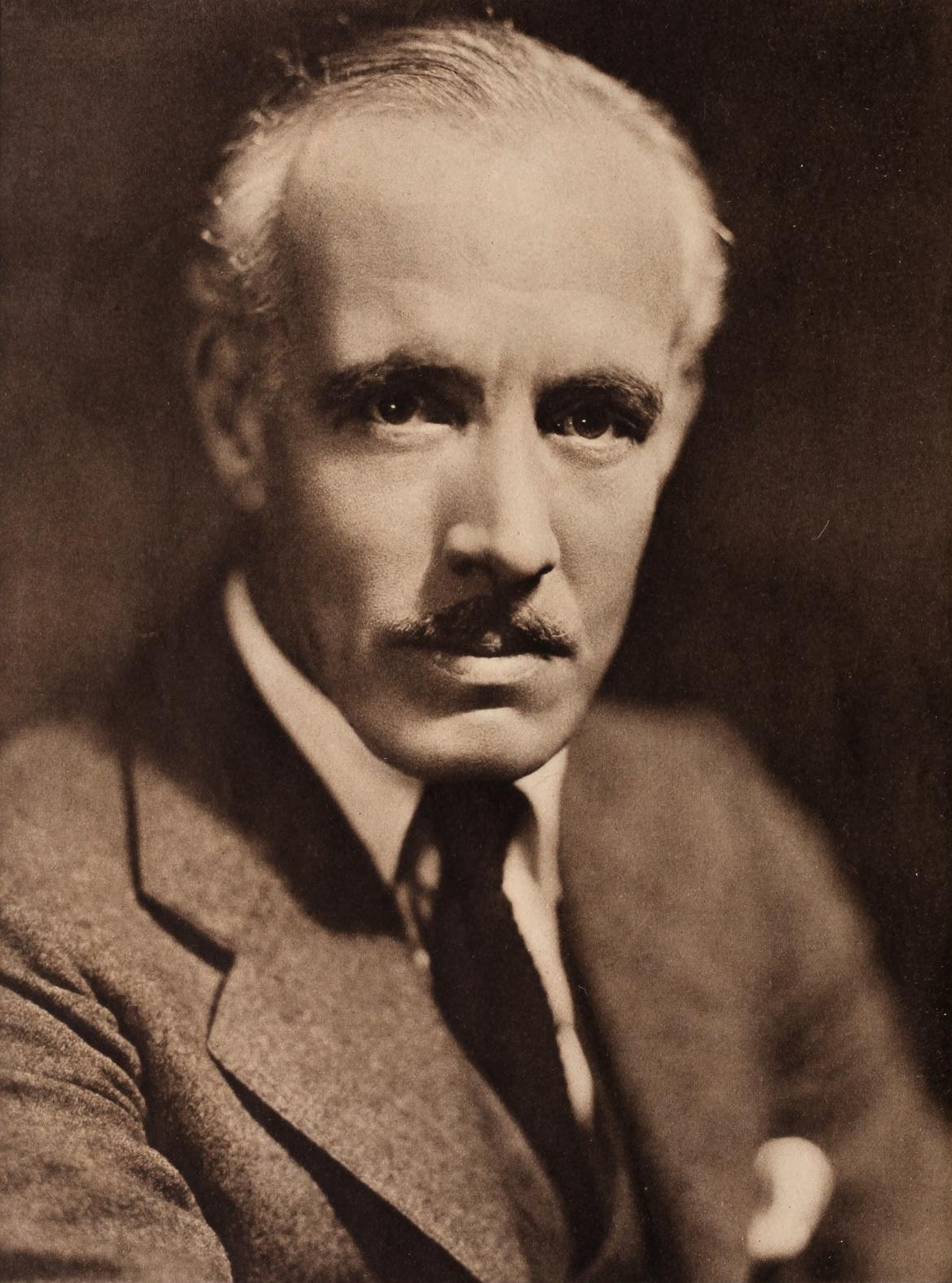
- Portrait in Photoplay, 1923
- Born: Lewis Shepard Stone; November 15, 1879; Worcester, Massachusetts, U.S.
- Died: September 12, 1953 (aged 73); Los Angeles, California, U.S.
- Occupation: Actor
- Years active: 1911–1953
- Employer: Metro-Goldwyn-Mayer (1924–1953)
- Spouse(s): Margaret Langham (stage name) (m. 1906; died 1917) Florence Oakley (stage name) (m. 1920; div. 1929) Hazel Elizabeth Wolf (m. 1930; his death)
- Children: 3

Lewis Shepard Stone (November 15, 1879 – September 12, 1953) was an American film actor, best known for his 29 years as a contract player at Metro-Goldwyn-Mayer and for his portrayal of Judge James Hardy in the studio's popular Andy Hardy film series. He was nominated for the Academy Award for Best Actor, in 1929, for his performance as Russian Count Pahlen in The Patriot (1928). Stone was also cast in seven films with Greta Garbo, including Grand Hotel (1932) in which he portrayed Doctor Otternschlag.

== Early life ==
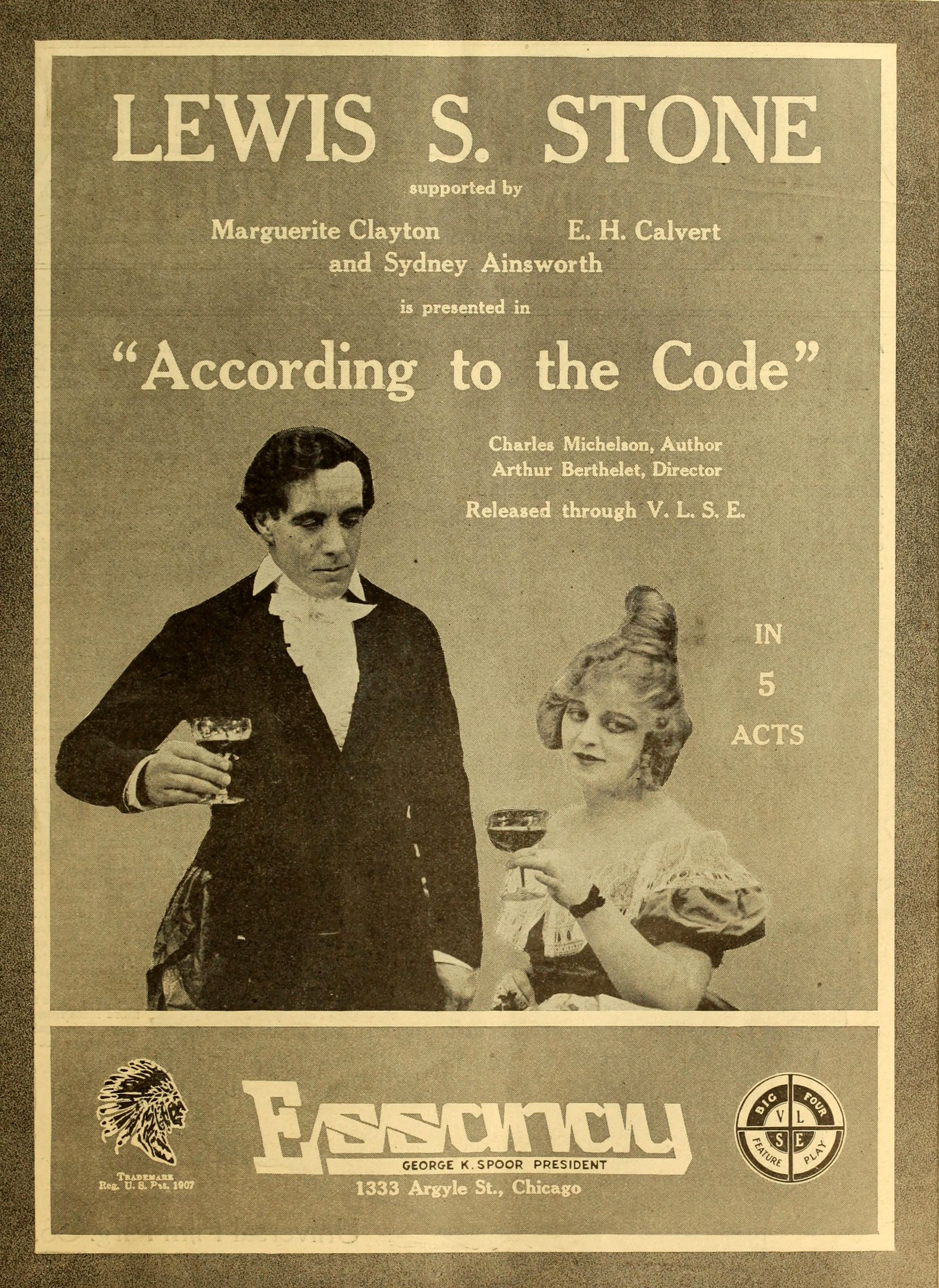
According to the Code (1916)

Stone was born in Worcester, Massachusetts, in 1879, the youngest of four children of Philena (née Ball) and Bertrand Stone. His father, according to the federal census of 1880, supported the family as a boot cutter. After obtaining his public education in Worcester, Lewis joined the United States Army during the Spanish–American War, serving as a lieutenant and later being deployed to China to train troops. He returned to the United States, and following his discharge from the army began his career as a writer and actor.

== Career ==
In the early-1900s Stone was considered by the critics to be the most popular leading man in stock in America. For eight years, he held the role as leading man with the Oliver Morosco Stock Company in Los Angeles.

In 1912, Stone found success in the popular play Bird of Paradise, which starred Laurette Taylor. The play was later filmed in 1932 and 1951.

For the summer of 1913 Stone appeared at Elitch Theatre in Denver, Colorado, as the leading man for the season. The proprietor of the theatre, Mary Elitch Long, recalled an event when Stone heard of a nearby family in need and he "went to a neighborhood grocery and, placing $25.00 on the counter, told the storekeeper to see to it that the bereaved little family wanted for nothing; and to let him know when more money was needed and to say nothing about it."

His career was interrupted by a return to the Army in World War I, serving as a major in the cavalry.

Before leaving for the war he made his feature film debut in Honor's Altar in 1916. He showed up in First National's 1920 Nomads of the North to good effect playing a Royal Canadian Mounted Policeman. He portrayed the title role in the 1922 silent film version of The Prisoner of Zenda.

From 1920 to 1927, he lived in Los Angeles at 212 S. Wilton Place. The home is now Los Angeles Cultural-Historic Monument #925 and is in the Wilton Historic District.

In 1924, Stone joined the newly formed Metro-Goldwyn-Mayer studio as a contract player, where he remained until his death in 1953.

Stone was nominated for the Academy Award for Best Actor in 1929 for The Patriot. He played the character that gives the film its title, but he was not the top-billed star. He appeared in seven films with Greta Garbo, spanning both the silent and early sound period. In 1932, he portrayed Dr. Otternschlag in the Garbo film Grand Hotel, in which he utters the famous closing line "Grand Hotel. People coming. Going. Nothing ever happens."

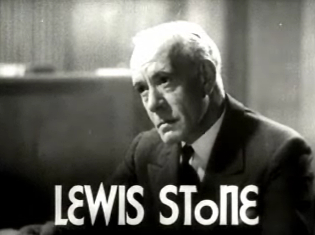
Stone in the trailer of Woman Wanted (1935)

He played a larger role in the 1933 Garbo film Queen Christina. His appearance in the successful prison film The Big House furthered his career. He played adventurers in the dinosaur epic The Lost World (1925) with Wallace Beery and The Mask of Fu Manchu (1932) with Boris Karloff, and a police captain in Bureau of Missing Persons (1933).

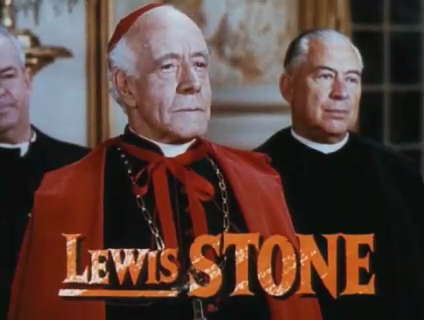
Stone in the trailer of The Prisoner of Zenda (1952)

In 1937, Stone first appeared in the role which became his most famous, that of wise and kindly Judge James Hardy in the Andy Hardy film series, starring Mickey Rooney. Stone appeared as the judge in 14 of the 16 Hardy movies, beginning with You're Only Young Once (1937). Lionel Barrymore had portrayed the judge in the first Hardy movie, and Stone died before the making of the last one, Andy Hardy Comes Home (1958), so Judge Hardy's death was written into the script. During the heyday of the series, Stone also appeared with Rooney in the short subject Andy Hardy's Dilemma, which promoted charitable donations to the Community Chest.

During World War II, the 60-plus year-old Stone was a lieutenant colonel in the California National Guard.

Stone was under contract to MGM for 29 years, the studio's longest-contracted actor, as well as the actor with the longest contract at any Hollywood movie studio. The week before his death, he and longtime MGM contract player Lionel Barrymore received gold keys to their dressing rooms. Stone appeared in approximately 100 films for MGM from 1924 to 1953.

== Personal life ==
Stone owned a beach house in the beachfront Venice neighborhood of Los Angeles. In 1930 the oil drilling boom in the Venice Beach-Del Ray oil field caused him to file a lawsuit to stop the drilling in order to prevent property damage and public nuisance. "The court ruled for Stone even though derricks ringed the beach ..."

In the 1930s he owned a 104-foot luxury schooner yacht named Serena. In 1937 the yacht was sold to Robert Paine Scripps (the father of Charles Scripps) and converted to a research vessel named the E. W. Scripps.

Stone campaigned for the reelection of President Herbert Hoover in 1932.

== Death ==
Stone died in Hancock Park, Los Angeles, on September 12, 1953, aged 73. He reportedly suffered a heart attack while chasing away some neighborhood kids who were throwing rocks at his garage or trampling his meticulously kept prized garden. Another published report states that on that date Stone and his third wife were watching television when they heard a racket in the back yard. When he investigated, Stone found lawn furniture once again floating in the pool and glimpsed three or perhaps four teenage boys running toward the street. Stone gave chase despite his wife's warning not to exert himself. Upon reaching the sidewalk, Stone suddenly collapsed. A gardener, Juan Vergara, witnessed the chase and summoned aid.

The New York Times reported: "The police said the actor had gone to his swimming pool to investigate a noise he thought had been caused by rocks being thrown into the water. He chased some boys into the street and collapsed on the sidewalk. He did not regain consciousness."

The Associated Press account was published in many newspapers: "The widow, Mrs. Hazel Stone, told police that previously boys had thrown garden furniture in the pool. She said that while her husband was watching a television program last night he heard prowlers outside and went to chase them, although she warned him against exertion.

A photo published in newspapers of the day showed Stone lying on the sidewalk immediately after the incident. The photo was later included in Kenneth Anger's book of scandals titled Hollywood Babylon.

Lewis Stone was later honored with a star on the Hollywood Walk of Fame at 6524 Hollywood Blvd.

== Selected filmography ==
- The Bargain (1914)
- Honor's Altar (1916) as Warren Woods
- The Havoc (1916) (with Gladys Hanson) as Richard Craig
- According to the Code (1916) as Basil Beckenridge
- Inside the Lines (1918) as Captain Cavendish
- The Man of Bronze (1918) as John Adams
- Man's Desire (1919) as Tom Denton
- Milestones (1920) as John Rhead
- Nomads of the North (1920) as Cpl. O'Connor
- Held by the Enemy (1920) as Capt. Gordon Haine
- The Concert (1921) as Augustus Martinot
- Beau Revel (1921) as Lawrence 'Beau' Revel
- The Golden Snare (1921) as Sergeant Philip Raine
- Don't Neglect Your Wife (1921) as Langdon Masters
- The Child Thou Gavest Me (1921) as Edward Berkeley
- Pilgrims of the Night (1921) as Philip Champion / Lord Ellingham
- The Rosary (1922) as Father Brian Kelly
- A Fool There Was (1922) as John Schuyler
- The Prisoner of Zenda (1922) as Rudolf Rassendyll / King Rudolf
- Trifling Women (1922) as The Marquis Ferroni
- The Dangerous Age (1923) as John Emerson
- The World's Applause (1923) as John Elliott
- You Can't Fool Your Wife (1923) as Garth McBride
- Scaramouche (1923) as The Marquis de la Tour d'Azyr
- The Stranger (1924) as Keith Darrant
- Why Men Leave Home (1924) as John Emerson
- Cytherea (1924) as Lee Randon
- Husbands and Lovers (1924) as James Livingston
- Inez from Hollywood (1924) as Stewart Cuyler
- Cheaper to Marry (1925) as Jim Knight
- The Lost World (1925) as Sir John Roxton
- Confessions of a Queen (1925) as The King
- The Talker (1925) as Harry Lennox
- The Lady Who Lied (1925) as Horace Pierpont
- Fine Clothes (1925) as Earl of Denham
- What Fools Men (1925) as Joseph Greer
- Too Much Money (1926) as Robert Broadley
- The Girl from Montmartre (1926) asJerome Hautrive
- Old Loves and New (1926) as Gervas Carew
- Don Juan's Three Nights (1926) as Johann Aradi
- Midnight Lovers (1926) as Maj. William Ridgewell, RFC
- The Blonde Saint (1926) as Sebastian Maure
- An Affair of the Follies (1927) as Hammersley
- The Notorious Lady (1927) as Patrick Marlowe / John Carew
- Lonesome Ladies (1927) as John Fosdick
- The Prince of Headwaiters (1927) as Pierre
- The Private Life of Helen of Troy (1927) as Menelaus
- The Foreign Legion (1928) as Col. Destin
- The Patriot (1928) as Count Pahlen
- Freedom of the Press (1928) as Daniel Steele
- A Woman of Affairs (1928) as Dr. Hugh Trevelyan
- Wild Orchids (1929) as John Sterling
- The Trial of Mary Dugan (1929) as Edward West
- Wonder of Women (1929) as Stephen Trombolt
- Madame X (1929) as Louis Floriot
- Their Own Desire (1929) as Marlett
- Strictly Unconventional (1930) as Clive Champion-Cheney
- The Big House (1930) as Warden James Adams
- Romance (1930) as Cornelius Van Tuyl
- The Office Wife (1930) as Lawrence Fellowes
- Passion Flower (1930) as Antonio Morado
- Inspiration (1931) as Raymond Delval
- Father's Son (1931) as William Emory
- The Secret Six (1931) as Richard Newton, Attorney at Law
- My Past (1931) as Mr. John Thornley
- Always Goodbye (1931) as John Graham
- The Bargain (1931) as Maitland White
- The Phantom of Paris (1931) as Detective Costaud
- The Sin of Madelon Claudet (1931) as Carlo Boretti
- Mata Hari (1931) as Andriani
- Strictly Dishonorable (1931) as The Judge
- The Wet Parade (1932) as Roger Chilcote
- Grand Hotel (1932) as Dr. Otternschlag
- Night Court (1932) as Judge William Osgood
- Letty Lynton (1932) as District Attorney Haney
- New Morals for Old (1932) as Mr. Thomas
- Red-Headed Woman (1932) as William Legendre Sr.
- Unashamed (1932) as Henry Trask
- Divorce in the Family (1932) as John Parker
- The Mask of Fu Manchu (1932) as Nayland Smith
- The Son-Daughter (1932) as Dr. Dong Tong
- Men Must Fight (1933) as Edward Seward
- The White Sister (1933) as Prince Guido Chiaromonte
- Looking Forward (1933) as Gabriel Service Sr.
- Bureau of Missing Persons (1933) as Capt. Webb
- Queen Christina (1933) as Axel Oxenstierna
- You Can't Buy Everything (1934) as John Burton
- The Mystery of Mr. X (1934) as Inspector Connor
- The Girl from Missouri (1934) as Frank Cousins
- Treasure Island (1934) as Captain Smollett
- David Copperfield (1935) as Mr. Wickfield
- Vanessa: Her Love Story (1935) as Adam Paris
- West Point of the Air (1935) as General Carter
- Public Hero No. 1 (1935) as Prison Warden
- Woman Wanted (1935) as District Attorney Martin
- China Seas (1935) as Tom Davids
- Shipmates Forever (1935) as Adm. Richard Melville
- Tough Guy (1936) as Davis (scenes deleted)
- Three Godfathers (1936) as James Underwood, aka Doc
- The Unguarded Hour (1936) as General Lawrence
- Small Town Girl (1936) as Doctor Dakin
- Suzy (1936) as Baron Charville
- Sworn Enemy (1936) as Doctor Simon 'Doc' Gattle
- Don't Turn 'Em Loose (1936) as John Webster
- Outcast (1937) as Anthony Abbott (lawyer)
- The Thirteenth Chair (1937) as Inspector Marney
- The Man Who Cried Wolf (1937) as Lawrence Fontaine
- You're Only Young Once (1937) as Judge James K. Hardy
- The Bad Man of Brimstone (1937) as Mr. Jackson Douglas
- Judge Hardy's Children (1938) as Judge James K. Hardy
- Stolen Heaven (1938) as Joseph Langauer
- Yellow Jack (1938) as Major Reed
- Love Finds Andy Hardy (1938) as Judge James K. Hardy
- The Chaser (1938) as Dr. Delford Q. Prescott
- Out West with the Hardys (1938) as Judge James 'Jim' K. Hardy
- The Ice Follies of 1939 (1939) as Douglas Tolliver Jr.
- The Hardys Ride High (1939) as Judge James K. Hardy
- Andy Hardy Gets Spring Fever (1939) as Judge James K. Hardy
- Joe and Ethel Turp Call on the President (1939) as The President
- Judge Hardy and Son (1939) as Judge James K. Hardy
- Andy Hardy Meets Debutante (1940) as Judge James K. Hardy
- Sporting Blood (1940) as Davis Lockwood
- Andy Hardy's Dilemma: A Lesson in Mathematics... and Other Things (1940, short) as Judge James K. Hardy
- Andy Hardy's Private Secretary (1941) as Judge James K. Hardy
- Life Begins for Andy Hardy (1941) as Judge James K. Hardy
- The Bugle Sounds (1942) as Col. Jack Lawton
- The Courtship of Andy Hardy (1942) as Judge James K. Hardy
- Andy Hardy's Double Life (1942) as Judge James K. Hardy
- Plan for Destruction (1943, short) as Himself – Commentator
- Andy Hardy's Blonde Trouble (1944) as Judge James K. Hardy
- The Hoodlum Saint (1946) as Father Nolan
- Three Wise Fools (1946) as Judge James Trumbell
- Love Laughs at Andy Hardy (1946) as Judge James K. Hardy
- State of the Union (1948) as Sam Thorndyke
- The Sun Comes Up (1949) as Arthur Norton
- Any Number Can Play (1949) as Ben Gavery Snelerr
- Key to the City (1950) as Judge Silas Standish
- Stars in My Crown (1950) as Dr. Daniel Kalbert Harris, Sr.
- Grounds for Marriage (1951) as Dr. Carleton Radwin Young
- Night Into Morning (1951) as Dr. Horace Snyder
- Angels in the Outfield (1951) as Commissioner Arnold P. Hapgood
- Bannerline (1951) as Josh
- The Unknown Man (1951) as Judge James V. Hulbrook
- It's a Big Country (1951) as Church Sexton
- Just This Once (1952) as Judge Samuel Coulter
- Talk About a Stranger (1952) as Mr. Wardlaw
- Scaramouche (1952) as Georges de Valmorin
- The Prisoner of Zenda (1952) as The Cardinal
- All the Brothers Were Valiant (1953) as Capt. Holt (posthumous release)

== See also ==
- List of actors with Academy Award nominations
