= Ann Rutherford =

Canadian-born American actress (1917–2012)

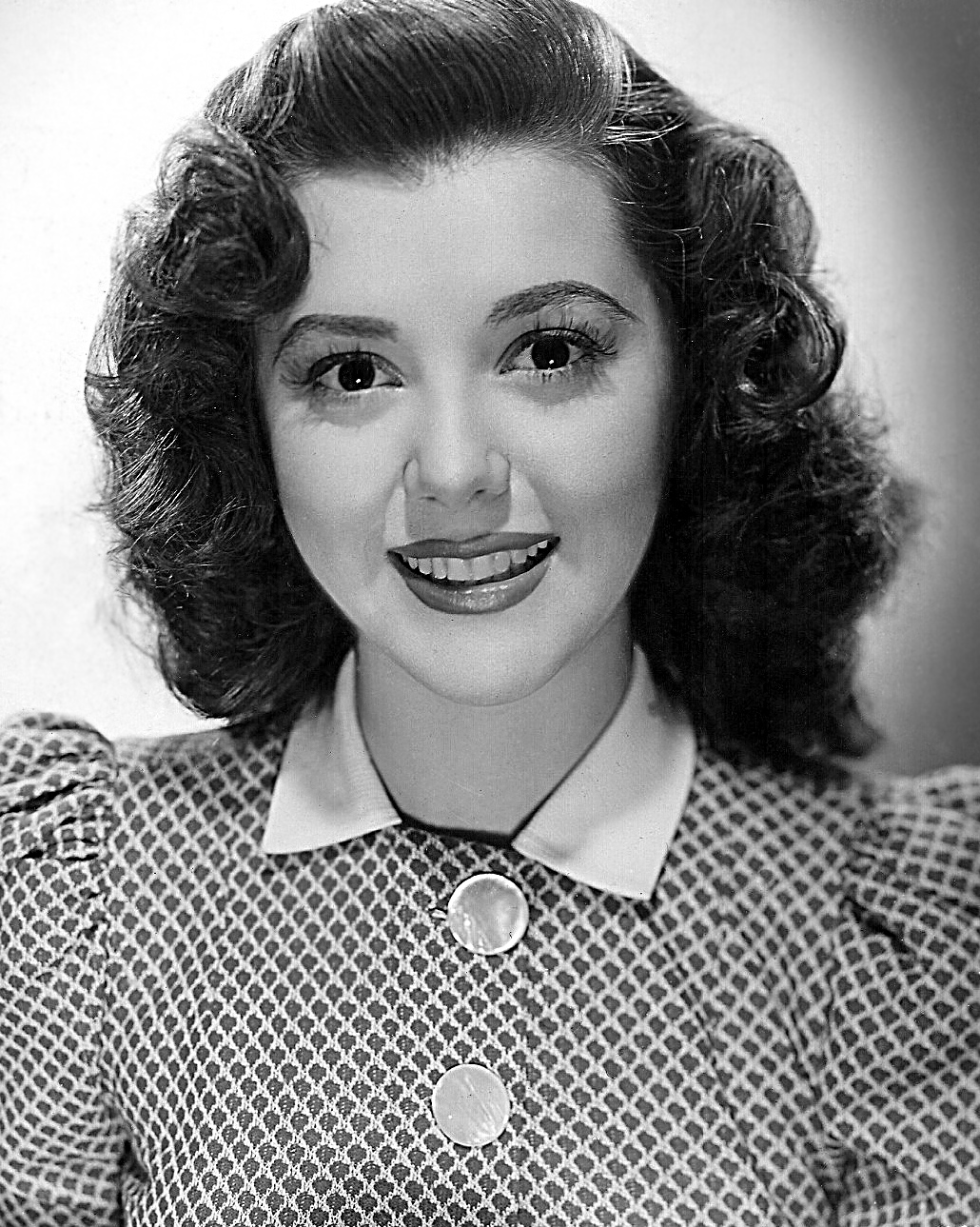
- Rutherford in a 1940s publicity photo
- Born: Therese Ann Rutherford; November 2, 1917; Vancouver, British Columbia, Canada
- Died: June 11, 2012 (aged 94); Beverly Hills, California, U.S.
- Occupation: Actress
- Years active: 1935–1978
- Notable work: Gone with the Wind, The Secret Life of Walter Mitty
- Spouses: David May (m. 1942; div. 1953) William Dozier (m. 1953; died 1991)
- Partner: Al Morley (1992–2012)
- Children: 1
- Relatives: Judith Arlen (sister)

Therese Ann Rutherford (November 2, 1917 – June 11, 2012) was a Canadian-born American actress in film, radio, and television. She had a long career starring and co-starring in films, playing Polly Benedict in 12 of the 16 MGM Andy Hardy films between 1937 and 1942, and appearing as one of Scarlett O'Hara's sisters, Carreen O'Hara, in the film Gone with the Wind (1939).

== Early life ==
Rutherford was born on November 2, 1917, in Vancouver, British Columbia to John Rutherford and Lucille (née Mansfield; 1890–1981) Rutherford. Rutherford's mother was a silent film actress, and her father was a former operatic tenor. While Rutherford was still a baby, the family moved to San Francisco. Soon afterwards, her parents separated and Lucille Mansfield moved to Los Angeles, with Ann and her sister Laurette, who later became known as Judith Arlen.

While roller skating home from middle school in Hollywood, Rutherford would stop at some of the radio studios to listen to voice actors perform. After being criticized one day by her English teacher, Rutherford decided to show her up. She falsified an acting history and applied for work at radio station KFAC. A month later, Rutherford had a part in a radio serial drama.

== Career ==
=== Film career ===
In 1935, Rutherford began her Hollywood film career in the starring role of Joan O'Brien in the dramatic film Waterfront Lady for Mascot Pictures, later to be Republic Pictures. Rutherford soon established herself as a popular leading lady of Western films at Republic, costarring with actors Gene Autry and John Wayne.

In 1937, Rutherford left Republic and signed a film contract with Metro-Goldwyn-Mayer (MGM), where she appeared as the Spirit of Christmas Past in A Christmas Carol (1938) and Lydia Bennet in Pride and Prejudice (1940) among other roles.

In 1938, MGM lent Rutherford to Selznick International Pictures to appear as Carreen O'Hara, Scarlett O'Hara's sister, in Gone with the Wind (1939). MGM boss Louis Mayer initially refused the loan because he considered the role too minor, but Rutherford passionately appealed to him to change his mind. In December 1939, while promoting the new movie, Rutherford visited six Confederate Army veterans at the Confederate Soldiers Home near Atlanta. One of the veterans gave Rutherford a rose corsage tied with Confederate colors.

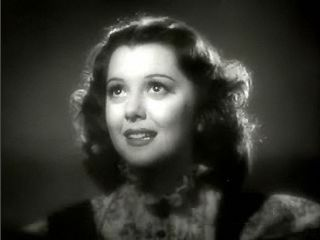
Rutherford in Dramatic School (1938)

From 1937 until 1942, Rutherford portrayed Polly Benedict in the MGM Andy Hardy youth comedy film series starring Mickey Rooney. Her first film in this series was You're Only Young Once (1937) and the last was Andy Hardy's Double Life (1942). Rutherford's performances as Andy Hardy's sweet and patient girlfriend established her screen popularity.

Rutherford also played Carol Lambert, comedian Red Skelton's screen girlfriend, for MGM in a series of mystery/comedies: Whistling in the Dark (1941), Whistling in Dixie (1942), and Whistling in Brooklyn (1943).

In the early 1940s, Rutherford left MGM to freelance with different studios. During this period, she appeared in films such as Orchestra Wives (1942) with 20th Century Fox, Two O'Clock Courage (1945) with RKO Radio Pictures, and The Secret Life of Walter Mitty (1947), also with RKO. In 1950, Rutherford retired from films. Despite Mickey Rooney's pleas, she declined to appear as Polly Benedict in the final Andy Hardy film, Andy Hardy Comes Home (1958), stating that she did not believe most people married their first sweethearts and that Andy Hardy becoming a judge was implausible. In 1972, Rutherford returned to MGM for a small part in They Only Kill Their Masters, the last major film to be shot on the MGM backlot before it was razed and sold to developers. Rutherford's final film appearance was a cameo role in Won Ton Ton, the Dog Who Saved Hollywood (1976).

== Personal life and death ==
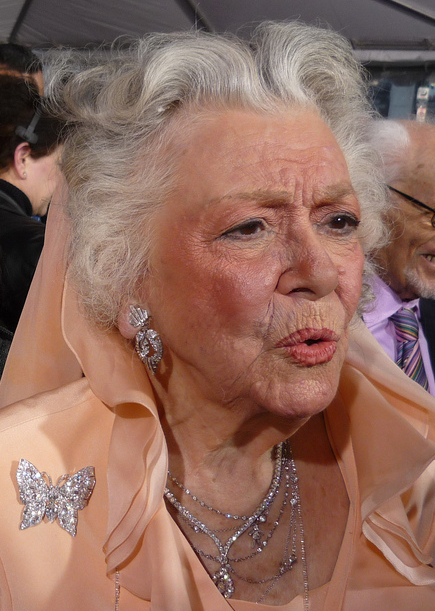
Ann Rutherford in April 2010

Rutherford was married twice. On December 31, 1942, she married David May II, the grandson of the founder of the May Company department stores; the couple had a daughter, Gloria May Voeller. On June 6, 1953, Rutherford and May were divorced in Juárez, Mexico. On October 7, 1953, in New York City, Rutherford married actor/producer William Dozier, the creator of the Batman (1966–1968) TV series. Dozier died in Santa Monica, California, of a stroke on April 23, 1991.

Rutherford died at her home in Beverly Hills, California, on June 11, 2012, following declining health due to heart problems. She was 94. She was cremated and her ashes given to her daughter. Her companion of twenty years was Al Morley.

== Filmography ==
=== Features ===
Year	Title	Role	Notes
1935	Waterfront Lady	Joan O'Brien	
1935	Melody Trail	Millicent Thomas	
1935	The Fighting Marines	Frances Schiller	12-chapter serial
1935	The Singing Vagabond	Lettie Morgan	
1936	The Oregon Trail	Anne Ridgeley	lost film
1936	The Lawless Nineties	Janet Carter	
1936	Doughnuts and Society	Joan Dugan	
1936	Comin' Round the Mountain	Dolores Moreno	
1936	The Harvester	Ruth Jameson	
1936	The Lonely Trail	Virginia Terry	
1936	Down to the Sea	Helen Pappas	
1937	Espionage	Train Passenger	Uncredited
1937	The Devil Is Driving	Kitty Wooster	
1937	Public Cowboy No. 1	Helen Morgan	
1937	Live, Love and Learn		
1937	The Bride Wore Red	Third Peasant Girl	Uncredited
1937	You're Only Young Once	Polly Benedict	
1938	Of Human Hearts	Annie Hawks	
1938	Judge Hardy's Children	Polly Benedict	
1938	Love Finds Andy Hardy	Polly Benedict	
1938	Out West with the Hardys	Polly Benedict	
1938	Dramatic School	Yvonne	
1938	A Christmas Carol	Spirit of Christmas Past	
1939	Four Girls in White	Patricia Page	
1939	The Hardys Ride High	Polly Benedict	
1939	Andy Hardy Gets Spring Fever	Polly Benedict	
1939	These Glamour Girls	Mary Rose Wilston	
1939	Dancing Co-Ed	Eve	
1939	Gone with the Wind	Carreen O'Hara	
1939	Judge Hardy and Son	Polly Benedict	
1940	The Ghost Comes Home	Billie Adams	
1940	Andy Hardy Meets Debutante	Polly Benedict	
1940	Pride and Prejudice	Lydia Bennet	
1940	Wyoming	Lucy Kincaid	
1940	Keeping Company	Mary Thomas	
1941	Andy Hardy's Private Secretary	Polly Benedict	
1941	Washington Melodrama	Laurie Claymore	
1941	Whistling in the Dark	Carol Lambert	
1941	Life Begins for Andy Hardy	Polly Benedict	
1941	Badlands of Dakota	Anne Grayson	
1942	The Courtship of Andy Hardy	Polly Benedict	
1942	This Time for Keeps	Katherine 'Kit' White	
1942	Orchestra Wives	Connie Ward	
1942	Andy Hardy's Double Life	Polly Benedict	
1942	Whistling in Dixie	Carol Lambert	
1943	Happy Land	Lenore Prentiss	
1943	Whistling in Brooklyn	Carol Lambert	
1944	Bermuda Mystery	Constance Martin	
1945	Two O'Clock Courage	Patty Mitchell	
1945	Bedside Manner	Lola Cross	
1946	The Madonna's Secret	Linda	
1946	Murder in the Music Hall	Gracie	
1946	Inside Job	Claire Gray Norton	
1947	The Secret Life of Walter Mitty	Gertrude Griswold	
1948	Adventures of Don Juan	Donna Elena	
1950	Operation Haylift	Clara Masters	
1972	They Only Kill Their Masters	Gloria	
1976	Won Ton Ton, the Dog Who Saved Hollywood	Grayson's Studio Secretary	(final film Role)

=== Short subjects ===
Year	Title	Role
1936	Annie Laurie	Annie Laurie
1937	Carnival in Paris	Lisette
1938	Andy Hardy's Dilemma	
1939	Angel of Mercy	Sister of Dead Soldier (uncredited)
1940	Screen Snapshots: Sports in Hollywood	Herself, Polo Fan
1947	Unusual Occupations: Film Tot Holiday	
