= Kathleen (film) =

1941 film by Harold S. Bucquet

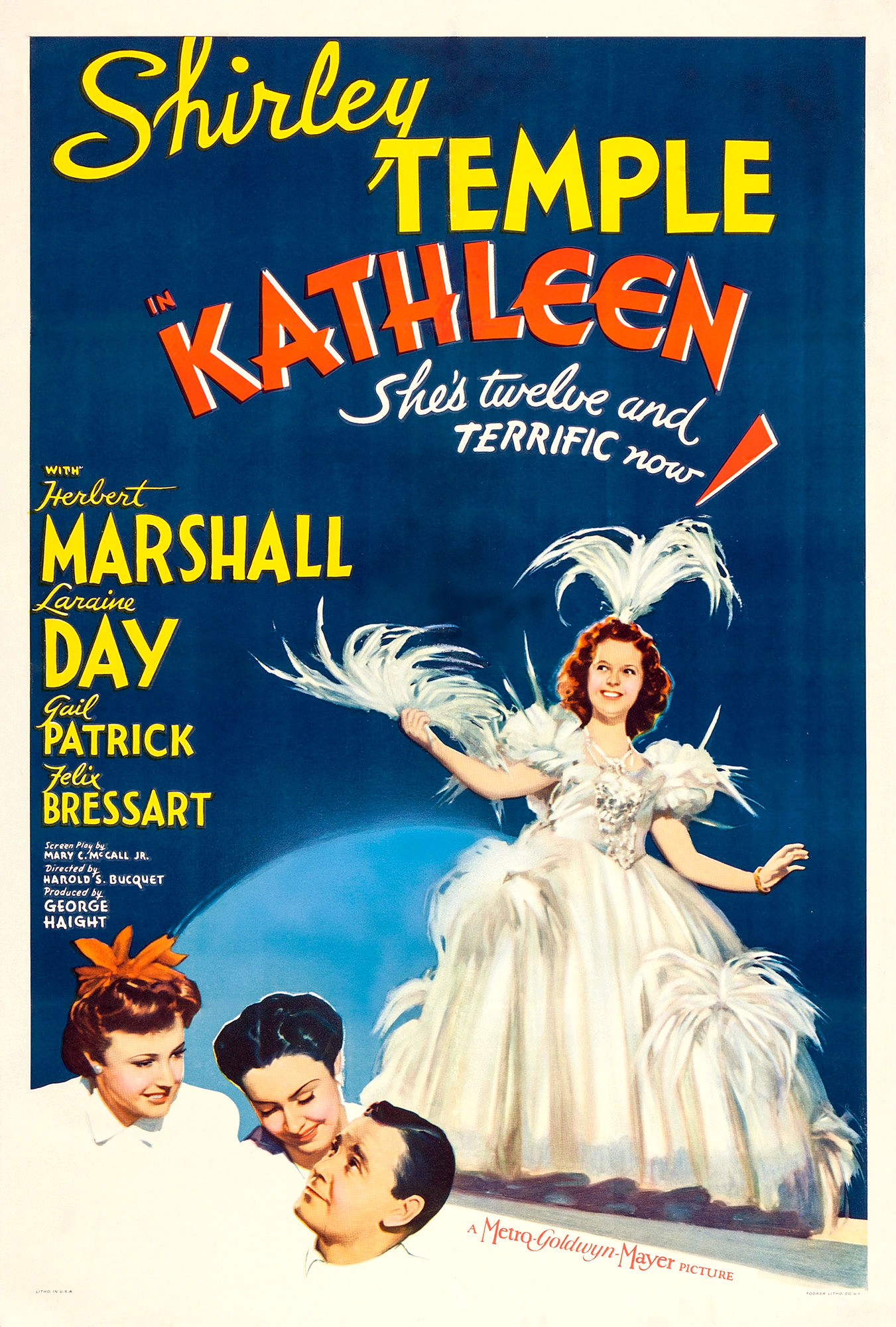
- Film poster
- Directed by: Harold S. Bucquet
- Written by: Mary C. McCall Jr. Kay Van Riper
- Produced by: George Haight
- Starring: Shirley Temple; Herbert Marshall; Laraine Day; Gail Patrick
- Cinematography: Sidney Wagner
- Edited by: Conrad A. Nervig
- Music by: Franz Waxman
- Production company: Metro-Goldwyn-Mayer
- Distributed by: Loew's, Inc.
- Release date: December 18, 1941
- Running time: 88 min.
- Country: United States
- Language: English

Kathleen is a 1941 American comedy drama film directed by Harold S. Bucquet starring Shirley Temple, Herbert Marshall, Laraine Day and Gail Patrick. It was Temple's first comeback role since "retiring" from the screen a year earlier. It was the only movie she made for Metro-Goldwyn-Mayer.

== Plot ==
Kathleen Davis is a 12-year-old who lives in a big house with a nanny, a butler, maids—but no mother. Her father, John Davis, spends most of his time at work, sparing little time to spend with his daughter. Kathleen dreams of a traditional family and tells her friends that she has such a family. Because of this fib, she cannot invite any friends to her home, as they would see the truth.

Kathleen and her nanny, Mrs. Farrell, have a contentious relationship. Mr. Davis dismisses the nanny and hires a psychologist named Dr. Angela Kent to look after the young girl for the summer. He has begun seeing a woman named Lorraine Bennett, whom he considers marrying, but Lorraine and Kathleen come to dislike each other intensely. Instead, Kathleen envisions Dr. Kent as the perfect mother for her, and wife for her father. Once she determines this seems unlikely, Kathleen runs away from home. After a confrontation with Lorraine and Dr. Kent, Mr. Davis decides that he, too, prefers the doctor. The film ends happily, as Kathleen is reunited with her father and his new fiancée, the doctor.

== Cast ==
- Shirley Temple as Kathleen Davis
- Herbert Marshall as Mr. Davis
- Laraine Day as Dr. Martha Kent
- Gail Patrick as Miss Bennett
- Felix Bressart as Mr. Schoner
- Nella Walker as Mrs. Farrell
- Lloyd Corrigan as Dr. Montague Foster
- Guy Bellis as Jarvis
- Wade Boteler as Policeman
- Charles Judels as Manager

== Reception ==
The film was not received well by critics. Theodore Strauss of The New York Times wrote that, "MGM, her new sponsors, haven't done right by our Shirley. Out of her indubitable charm they have created a vexatious, pucker-faced little brat full of sugary day dreams to make an audience wince. They have confronted her proven talents as an actress with stilted situations that even a Duse couldn't carry off. Assigned to a vehicle for Mistress Temple, the script writer seems to have become all thumbs." Variety called the film "tedious" and said that Temple "does not tee off auspiciously." John Mosher of The New Yorker wrote, "I must say that they have given the diva a disagreeable kind of vehicle for her resuscitation from private life ... Child psychologists may go to the film in groups and classes, but frivolous types will hope the child is not now, even so near her teens, going to make a specialty of problem pictures." Life wrote that Temple gave "a good performance in a pretty dull story."
