= E. J. Babille =

American film director (1883–1970)

- Born: Edward Julius Babille; May 3, 1883; Milwaukee, Wisconsin, United States
- Died: February 18, 1970 (aged 86); Los Angeles, California, United States
- Occupation: Assistant director
- Years active: 1921–1937

E.J. Babille (May 3, 1883 – February 18, 1970) was born Edward Julius Babille in Milwaukee, Wisconsin. He was an American assistant director in the silent and early sound film eras.

In the first twelve years of his career he would work almost exclusively with three directors: E. Mason Hopper, Edward H. Griffith, and Paul Stein, who directed seventeen of the twenty-one films on which Babille was the assistant director. He left the film industry in 1939, and died on February 18, 1970.

== Filmography ==
(Per AFI database — all positions were as assistant director, unless otherwise noted)

- One Wonderful Night (1914) (actor)
- All's Fair in Love (1921)
- The Great White Way (1924)
- Janice Meredith (1924)
- Paris at Midnight (1926) (production manager)
- My Friend From India (1927)
- No Control (1927)
- The Wise Wife (1927)
- A Blonde for a Night (1928)
- Captain Swagger (1928)
- Love Over Night (1928)
- Marked Money (1928)
- Her Private Affair (1929)
- The Office Scandal (1929)
- Rich People (1929)
- The Shady Lady (1929)
- The Sophomore (1929)
- This Thing Called Love (1929)
- Sin Takes a Holiday (1930)
- The Big Gamble (1931)
- Lady with a Past (1932)
- A Woman Commands (1932)
- No More Ladies (1935) (actor)
- My Dear Miss Aldrich (1937)
- You're Only Young Once (1937)
- They All Come Out (1939)
