= Velvet Fingers =

1920 film

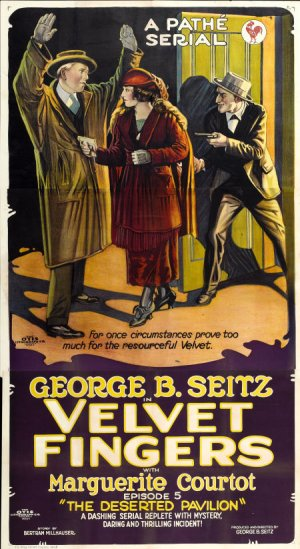
- Film poster for episode 5
- Directed by: George B. Seitz
- Written by: James Shelley Hamilton; Bertram Millhauser
- Produced by: George B. Seitz
- Starring: George B. Seitz; Marguerite Courtot
- Distributed by: Pathé Exchange
- Release date: December 5, 1920
- Running time: 15 episodes
- Country: United States
- Language: Silent (English intertitles)

Velvet Fingers is a 1920 American adventure film serial directed by George B. Seitz. Although the film is listed as lost by some sources, a copy is available in the archives of the Cinémathèque Française.

== Cast ==
- George B. Seitz as Velvet Fingers
- Marguerite Courtot as Lorna George
- Harry Semels as Professor Robin
- Lucille Lennox as Clara
- Frank Redman as Pinky
- Thomas Carr as Mickey (credited as Tommy Carr)
- Joe Cuny as Needless Smith
- Al Franklin Thomas
- Edward Elkas

== Chapter titles ==
1. To Catch a Thief
2. The Face Behind the Curtain
3. The Hand from Behind the Door
4. The Man in the Blue Spectacles
5. The Deserted Pavilion
6. Unmasked
7. The House of a Thousand Veils
8. Aiming Straight
9. The Broken Necklace
10. Shots in the Dark
11. The Other Woman
12. Into Ambush
13. The Hidden Room
14. The Trap
15. Out of the Web

== See also ==
- List of film serials
- List of film serials by studio
