= Times Square Lady =

1935 film by George B. Seitz

- Directed by: George B. Seitz
- Written by: Albert J. Cohen; Robert T. Shannon
- Produced by: Lucien Hubbard
- Starring: Robert Taylor; Virginia Bruce; Helen Twelvetrees
- Cinematography: Lester White
- Edited by: Hugh Wynn
- Music by: Edward Ward
- Production company: Metro-Goldwyn-Mayer
- Distributed by: Loew's Inc.
- Release date: March 8, 1935
- Running time: 68 minutes
- Country: United States
- Language: English
- Box office: $424,000

Times Square Lady is a 1935 American crime drama film directed by George B. Seitz and starring Robert Taylor, Virginia Bruce and Helen Twelvetrees. It was produced and distributed by Metro-Goldwyn-Mayer.

== Plot ==
Toni Bradley comes to New York from Iowa to take over her late father's business, most of which involved gambling. Her father's former associates plan to take the business away from her but with the help of one of them, Steve Gordon who changes sides and a songwriter, Pinky Tomlin, she manages to fight back.

== Cast ==
- Robert Taylor as Steve Gordon
- Virginia Bruce as Toni Bradley
- Pinky Tomlin as Pinky Tomlin of Durant Oklahoma
- Helen Twelvetrees as Margo Heath
- Isabel Jewell as 'Babe'
- Nat Pendleton as Mack
- Jack La Rue as Jack Kramer
- Henry Kolker as Mr. Fielding
- Raymond Hatton as 'Slim' Kennedy
- Russell Hopton as Ed Brennan
- Fred Kohler as 'Dutch' Meyers
- Robert Elliott as 'Brick' Culver
- Paul Stanton as Barney Engel
- George Irving as Mr. Ashton
- Pat Flaherty as Buck Pierson, Hockey Player
- Ward Bond as Dugan, Hockey Player
- Dick Elliott as Stage Doorman
- Tyler Brooke as Casa Nova Bandmaster
- Beatrice Roberts as Casa Nova Patron
- Ellinor Vanderveer as Casa Nova Patron

== Reception ==
According to MGM records the film earned $310,000 in the US and Canada and $114,000 elsewhere, making a profit of $131,000.

== Bibliography ==
- Quirk, Lawrence J. The Films of Robert Taylor. Citadel Press, 1975.
