= Russell Lewis (choreographer) =

American choreographer, dancer and theatre producer

- Born: Russell Dyke Lewis; July 19, 1908; Hollywood, California, U.S.
- Died: December 9, 1992 (aged 84)
- Occupations: Choreographer, dancer, theatre producer
- Spouse: Kay Van Riper (m. 1938; div. 1942)

Russell Dyke Lewis (July 19, 1908 – December 9, 1992), also known as Russell L. Lewis, was an American choreographer, dancer and theatre producer. He was nominated for an Academy Award in the category Best Dance Direction for the film Dancing Pirate.

Lewis died on December 9, 1992, at the age of 84.

== Selected filmography ==
- Dancing Pirate (1936)
