= Lester White =

American cinematographer active 1930s-1950s

- Born: July 25, 1907; New York City
- Died: December 4, 1958 (aged 51); Los Angeles, California
- Occupation: cinematographer
- Years active: 1933-1959

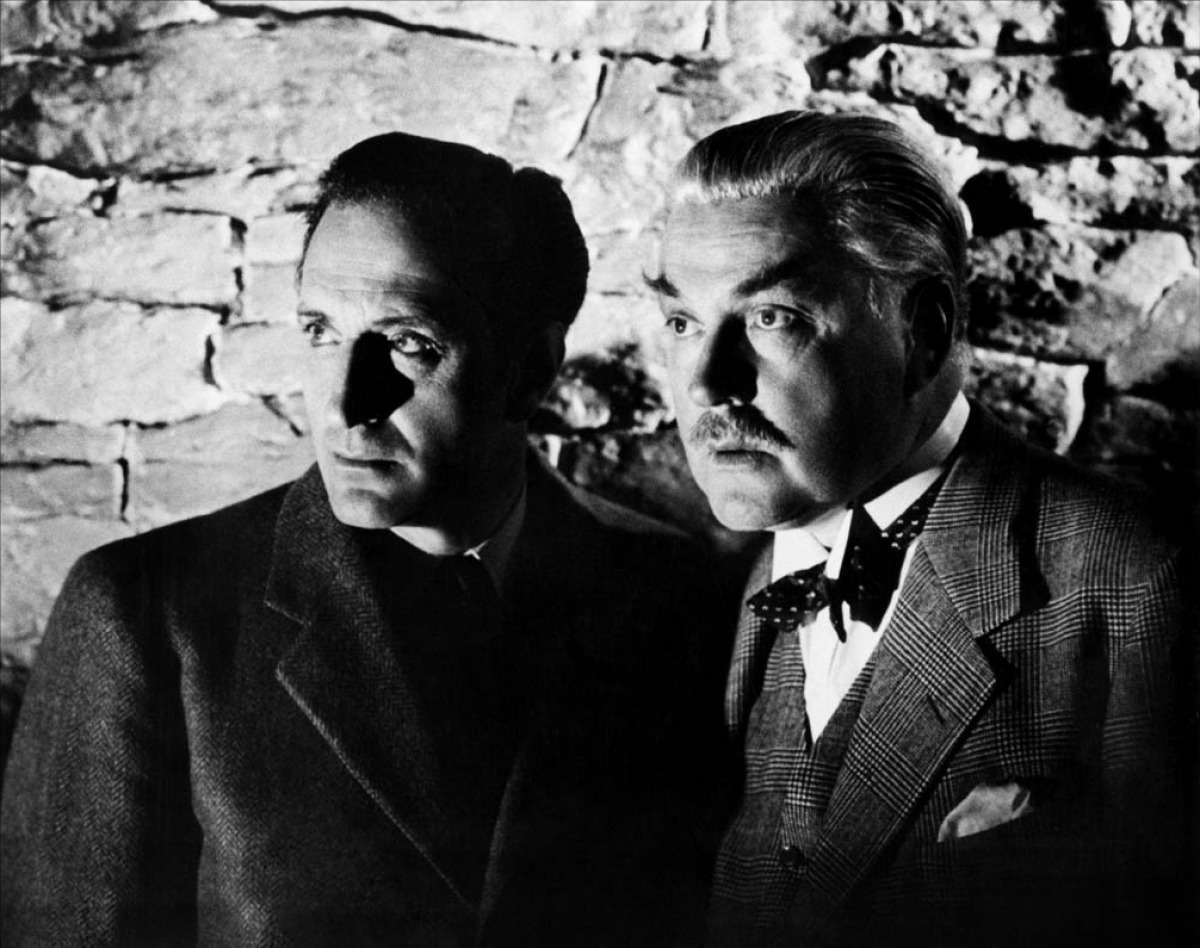
Sherlock Holmes and the Secret Weapon 2.jpg

Lester White (July 25, 1907 - December 4, 1958) was an American cinematographer. He spent most of his career at Metro-Goldwyn-Mayer, where he photographed a long run of the studio's programme pictures, including entries in the Andy Hardy and Dr. Kildare series, before moving to smaller studios and, in the 1950s, to television. He was a member of the American Society of Cinematographers.

== Career ==
White was born in New York City on July 25, 1907. He entered the film industry as an assistant cameraman at Goldwyn Studios during the transition to sound, working in that capacity on pictures including Whoopee! (1930) and Smilin' Through (1932), before joining Metro-Goldwyn-Mayer.

His first credit as a director of photography was The Prizefighter and the Lady (1933). At MGM he worked chiefly on the studio's lower-budget output rather than its prestige productions, photographing several films in the Andy Hardy series, among them Love Finds Andy Hardy (1938), and in the Dr. Kildare series.

In the later part of his career White worked for Republic and Allied Artists, where his assignments turned towards genre pictures; the best known of these is the science-fiction film The Monster That Challenged the World (1957). During the 1950s he also photographed episodic television, including instalments of Navy Log, The Millionaire, Crossroads, Boots and Saddles, Rescue 8 and The Rifleman.

Writing about him in 2026, the cinematographer Richard Crudo, a former president of the American Society of Cinematographers, described White as belonging to a largely unheralded group of studio cameramen whose work was prolific and widely seen but never attained the reputation of contemporaries such as Gregg Toland.

== Death ==
White died in Los Angeles on December 4, 1958, at the age of 51. He is buried in the Garden of Hope section of Valhalla Memorial Park Cemetery in North Hollywood.

== Selected filmography ==
- The Prizefighter and the Lady (1933)
- Laughing Boy (1934)
- A Wicked Woman (1934)
- Society Doctor (1934)
- Times Square Lady (1935)
- Calm Yourself (1935)
- We Went to College (1936)
- The Longest Night (1936)
- The Murder Man (1936)
- The Women Men Marry (1937)
- You're Only Young Once (1937)
- Judge Hardy and Son (1939)
- Andy Hardy Gets Spring Fever (1938)
- Love Finds Andy Hardy (1938)
- Judge Hardy's Children (1938)
- Yellow Jack (1938)
- Calling Dr. Kildare (1939)
- Henry Goes Arizona (1939)
- Babes on Broadway (1941)
- Life Begins for Andy Hardy (1941)
- A Yank on the Burma Road (1942)
- The Courtship of Andy Hardy (1942)
- Miss Annie Rooney (1942)
- White Savage (1943)
- Sherlock Holmes in Washington (1943)
- Blonde Fever (1944)
- Andy Hardy's Blonde Trouble (1944)
- The Hidden Eye (1945)
- The Spirit of West Point (1947)
- The Fuller Brush Man (1948)
- Jungle Jim (1948)
- The Good Humor Man (1950)
- Harem Girl (1952)
- White Lightning (1953)
- The 49th Man (1953)
- The Stranger Wore a Gun (1953)
- Women's Prison (1955)
- Top Gun (1955)
- The Monster That Challenged the World (1957)
