= William Ludwig (screenwriter) =

American screenwriter

- Born: May 16, 1912; New York City, U.S.
- Died: February 7, 1999 (aged 86); Woodland Hills, Los Angeles, California, U.S.
- Education: Columbia University (BA)
- Occupations: Writer, screenwriter
- Years active: 1938–1961
- Spouses: Susan Riesenfeld (?–1999)
- Awards: Academy Award for Best Original Screenplay (1955)

William Ludwig (May 16, 1912 – February 7, 1999) was an American screenwriter.

Ludwig graduated from Columbia University in 1932. He was a member of the Philolexian Society at Columbia. In 1937 he joined MGM and his first screenplay was Love Finds Andy Hardy. He won, with Sonya Levien, an Oscar for "Best Writing, Story and Screenplay" in 1955 for Interrupted Melody. He remained a contract writer at MGM for 20 years, an industry record.

Other notable works include the screenplay for the 1955 production of Oklahoma!.

He died of complications from Parkinson disease.
