= Andy Hardy =

Fictional character played by Mickey Rooney

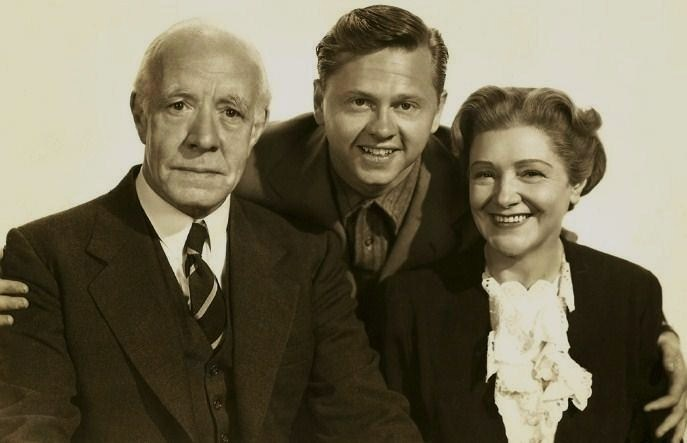
- Mickey Rooney (center) as Andy Hardy, with Judge Hardy (Lewis Stone) and Mrs. Hardy (Fay Holden), 1939
- First appearance: Stage: Skidding (1928); Film: A Family Affair (1937)
- Last appearance: Andy Hardy Comes Home (1958)
- Created by: Aurania Rouverol
- Portrayed by: Charles Eaton (stage); Mickey Rooney (film)

In-universe information
- Alias: Andrew Hardy
- Gender: Male
- Family: Judge James K. Hardy (father); Emily Hardy (mother); Marian Hardy (sister); Mildred (Milly) Forrest (aunt)
- Nationality: American

Andrew "Andy" Hardy is a fictional character best known for the Metro-Goldwyn-Mayer series of 16 films in which he was played by Mickey Rooney. The main film series was released from 1937 to 1946, with a final film made in 1958 in an unsuccessful attempt to revive the series. Hardy and other characters initially appeared in the 1928 play Skidding by Aurania Rouverol. Early films in the series were about the Hardy family as a whole, but later entries focused on the character of Andy Hardy. Rooney was the only member of the ensemble to appear in all 16 films. In their time, the Hardy films were enormously popular, sentimental light comedies celebrating ordinary American life.

== Theatre ==
The Hardy family first appeared in Aurania Rouverol's play Skidding, which debuted on May 21, 1928, at the Bijou Theatre and ran until July 1929. The original cast included Carleton Macy as Judge Hardy, Clara Blandick as Mrs. Hardy, Charles Eaton as Andy, Joan Madison as Myra, and Marguerite Churchill as Marion. Samuel Marx recommended to MGM that the play be adapted into a film.

== First film ==
The initial Hardy film, A Family Affair (1937), was based directly on Rouverol's play and was produced without a view to producing a series. It featured Lionel Barrymore as Judge Hardy and Spring Byington as Mrs. Hardy, Andy's parents, and Margaret Marquis as Andy's on-again-off-again sweetheart, Polly Benedict. Several of the actors in this initial Hardy film had been in the 1935 film Ah, Wilderness!, based on Eugene O’Neill’s only comedy: Barrymore, Byington, Rooney, Eric Linden, Cecilia Parker, Charley Grapewin, and Margaret Marquis. (Bonita Granville, who was also in Ah, Wilderness! but not in A Family Affair, has a major role in the last two original Hardy films, Andy Hardy's Blonde Trouble and Love Laughs at Andy Hardy.)

== Series ==
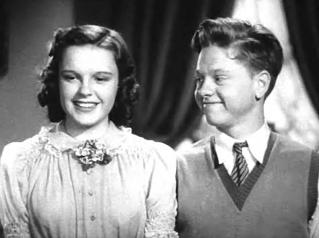
Judy Garland and Mickey Rooney in Love Finds Andy Hardy

When the series was launched, most of the cast was changed, with the exception of Rooney, Cecilia Parker as Andy's older sister Marian Hardy, and Sara Haden as Aunt Milly (except for two films when Betty Ross Clarke appeared as Milly). The second and subsequent films starred Lewis Stone as Judge Hardy, Fay Holden as Mrs. Hardy, and Ann Rutherford as Polly Benedict. The Hardys' oldest child, married daughter Joan Hardy Martin, appeared only in the first film and was not mentioned in the subsequent films.

Most of the movies were set in the Hardys' fictional hometown of Carvel, located in Idaho in the original play, but described in the films as being in the Midwest. (In the public service short film, Andy Hardy's Dilemma (1940), the Hardy family is residing in Los Angeles, with no mention of Carvel.) All of the films were sentimental comedies celebrating ordinary American life. The people in Carvel were generally kind, pious, patriotic, generous, and tolerant.

The early movies focused on the Hardy family as a whole, but the character Andy soon became the center of the series, and his name was featured in the title of the fourth film and all films from the seventh on. They were instrumental in Rooney's rise to stardom.

The central relationship in the films was between Andy and his father, Judge James Hardy, played by the grandfatherly looking Stone. Judge Hardy was a man of absolute morality and unimpeachable integrity, with a stern demeanor, but a kind heart and droll sense of humor. A typical Hardy film plot involved Andy getting into a minor predicament involving money or girls, usually because of youthful naivety, impulsiveness and a tendency to fudge the truth. This would lead to a "man-to-man" talk between Andy and his father, after which Andy would invariably do the right thing.

In three films, Rooney was paired with Judy Garland, beginning with Love Finds Andy Hardy, and continuing with Andy Hardy Meets Debutante (1940) and Life Begins for Andy Hardy (1941). Garland's character, Betsy Booth, is an aspiring singer and she sings in the first two of these films. Although Garland songs were planned for the final film, they were eventually dropped. Unlike Garland-Rooney films outside of the Andy Hardy series, Rooney's Hardy character is not a musician, so Garland and Rooney do not perform together in any of the Hardy films.

Rooney played the character continuously from age 16 to 25, when he appeared in Love Laughs at Andy Hardy (1946), in which Andy returned to civilian life after fighting in World War II. Twelve years later, an attempt to revive the series with an older, wiser Andy was made in 1958 with Andy Hardy Comes Home, but it turned out to be the final film in the series. Thus, the Andy Hardy series ended with a "To Be Continued", which indeed has yet to be continued.

== Filmography ==
1. A Family Affair (1937)
2. You're Only Young Once (1937)
3. Judge Hardy's Children (1938)
4. Love Finds Andy Hardy (1938)
5. Out West with the Hardys (1938)
6. The Hardys Ride High (1939)
7. Andy Hardy Gets Spring Fever (1939)
8. Judge Hardy and Son (1939)
9. Andy Hardy Meets Debutante (1940)
10. Andy Hardy's Private Secretary (1941)
11. Life Begins for Andy Hardy (1941)
12. The Courtship of Andy Hardy (1942)
13. Andy Hardy's Double Life (1942)
14. Andy Hardy's Blonde Trouble (1944)
15. Love Laughs at Andy Hardy (1946)
16. Andy Hardy Comes Home (1958)

Also, a 1940 short subject promoting the Community Chest was called Andy Hardy's Dilemma (18 minutes).

== Characters ==
- Names in white rectangles show which actors appeared in each film. A dark grey rectangle indicates that the character did not appear in that film.

| Character | Title | | | | | | | | | | | | | | | |
| Character | A Family Affair | You're Only Young Once | Judge Hardy's Children | Love Finds Andy Hardy | Out West with the Hardys | The Hardys Ride High | Andy Hardy Gets Spring Fever | Judge Hardy and Son | Andy Hardy Meets Debutante | Andy Hardy's Private Secretary | Life Begins for Andy Hardy | The Courtship of Andy Hardy | Andy Hardy's Double Life | Andy Hardy's Blonde Trouble | Love Laughs At Andy Hardy | Andy Hardy Comes Home |
|---|---|---|---|---|---|---|---|---|---|---|---|---|---|---|---|---|
| Andy Hardy | Mickey Rooney | Mickey Rooney | Mickey Rooney | Mickey Rooney | Mickey Rooney | Mickey Rooney | Mickey Rooney | Mickey Rooney | Mickey Rooney | Mickey Rooney | Mickey Rooney | Mickey Rooney | Mickey Rooney | Mickey Rooney | Mickey Rooney | Mickey Rooney |
| Judge Hardy | Lionel Barrymore | Lewis Stone | Lewis Stone | Lewis Stone | Lewis Stone | Lewis Stone | Lewis Stone | Lewis Stone | Lewis Stone | Lewis Stone | Lewis Stone | Lewis Stone | Lewis Stone | Lewis Stone | Lewis Stone | |
| Emily Hardy | Spring Byington | Fay Holden | Fay Holden | Fay Holden | Fay Holden | Fay Holden | Fay Holden | Fay Holden | Fay Holden | Fay Holden | Fay Holden | Fay Holden | Fay Holden | Fay Holden | Fay Holden | Fay Holden |
| Aunt Milly | Sara Haden | Sara Haden | Betty Ross Clarke | Betty Ross Clarke | Sara Haden | Sara Haden | Sara Haden | Sara Haden | Sara Haden | Sara Haden | Sara Haden | Sara Haden | Sara Haden | Sara Haden | Sara Haden | Sara Haden |
| Marion Hardy | Cecilia Parker | Cecilia Parker | Cecilia Parker | Cecilia Parker | Cecilia Parker | Cecilia Parker | Cecilia Parker | Cecilia Parker | Cecilia Parker | | | Cecilia Parker | Cecilia Parker | | | Cecilia Parker |
| Polly Benedict | Margaret Marquis | Ann Rutherford | Ann Rutherford | Ann Rutherford | Ann Rutherford | Ann Rutherford | Ann Rutherford | Ann Rutherford | Ann Rutherford | Ann Rutherford | Ann Rutherford | Ann Rutherford | Ann Rutherford | | | |
| Henry, the bailiff | Erville Alderson | | Erville Alderson | Erville Alderson | Erville Alderson | Erville Alderson | Erville Alderson | Erville Alderson | | | | Erville Alderson | Erville Alderson | | | |
| Wayne Trent | Eric Linden | | Robert Whitney | | | | | | | | | | | | | |
| Frank Redmond | Charley Grapewin | Frank Craven | | | | | | | | | | | | | | |
| Hoyt Wells | Selmer Jackson | Selmer Jackson | | | | | | | | | | | | | | |
| Tommy | | | Charles Peck | | | | Charles Peck | | | | | Charles Peck | Charles Peck | | Charles Peck | |
| Betsy Booth | | | | Judy Garland | | | | | Judy Garland | | Judy Garland | | | | | |
| Jimmy MacMahon | | | | Gene Reynolds | | | | | | Gene Reynolds | | | | | | |
| Dennis Hunt | | | | Don Castle | Don Castle | | | | | | | | | | | |
| Augusta | | | | Marie Blake | | | | Marie Blake | | | | | | | | |
| Beezy | | | | George P. Breakston | | | George P. Breakston | George P. Breakston | George P. Breakston | George P. Breakston | George P. Breakston | George P. Breakston | | | | Joey Forman |
| Peter Dugan | | | | Raymond Hatton | | | | | | Joseph Crehan | Joseph Crehan | Joseph Crehan | | | | |
| Don Davis | | | | | | John T. Murray | John T. Murray | | | | | | | | | |
| George Benedict | | | | | | | Addison Richards | | Addison Richards | Addison Richards | | | Addison Richards | | Addison Richards | |
| Principal Davis | | | | | | | John Dilson | | | John Dilson | | | | | | |
| Phrasie Daisey | | | | | | | Maxine Conrad | June Presser | | | | | | | | |
| Clarabelle | | | | | | | | Margaret Early | | Margaret Early | | | | | | |
| Harry Land | | | | | | | | | | Todd Karns | | Todd Karns | | | | |
| Jeff Willis | | | | | | | | | | | | William Lundigan | William Lundigan | | | |
| Joe Wilkins, the Postman | | | | | | | | | | | | John Butler | John Butler | | | |
| Red | | | | | | | | | | | | Frank Coghlan Jr. | Frank Coghlan Jr. | | | |
| Kay Wilson | | | | | | | | | | | | | | Bonita Granville | Bonita Granville | |

== Screen debuts ==
The Andy Hardy series served as a platform for Metro-Goldwyn-Mayer to introduce young, aspiring starlets, some of whom would go on to become major stars. As examples, Love Finds Andy Hardy (1938) featured Lana Turner in one of her first film appearances, while Andy Hardy's Private Secretary (1941) launched Kathryn Grayson's movie career, and Andy Hardy's Double Life (1942) marked the screen debut of Esther Williams.

== Other adaptations ==
=== Radio series ===
From late 1949 into 1952, MGM syndicated a half-hour weekly radio series called The Hardy Family, with a cast featuring Mickey Rooney, Lewis Stone and Fay Holden (Marian and Aunt Milly did not appear in this series); writers included Jack Rubin and Jameson Brewer; directed by Thomas A. McAvity. Episode numbers suggest more than 70 episodes of the series were broadcast. In 1952, the series was repeated on the Mutual Broadcasting System. Seven episodes of the series are preserved in an Internet Archive collection.

=== Comic books ===
In June 1947, Fiction House's Movie Comics published a comic book adaptation of the film Love Laughs at Andy Hardy.

Andy Hardy was also the subject of a six issue comic series published by Dell in 1952–1954.
