= Aurania Rouverol =

American dramatist (1886–1955)

- Born: Aurania Ellerbeck; August 13, 1886; Utah
- Died: June 23, 1955 (aged 68); Palo Alto, California
- Occupation: Playwright
- Spouse(s): Joseph Rouverol (m. 1915, divorced) William Fleetwood (m. 1946)
- Children: Jean Rouverol

Aurania Rouverol (née Ellerbeck; August 13, 1886 – June 23, 1955) was an American writer best known for her play Skidding, in which she created the characters of Andy Hardy and his family. The adventures of Andy Hardy were turned into a popular series of sixteen movies from Metro-Goldwyn-Mayer.

== Biography ==
Aurania Ellerbeck was born, the 22nd baby, in Utah to Thomas Witten Ellerbeck, one of the chief clerks of Brigham Young. She went to Stanford University and studied playwriting at Radcliffe. She worked as an actress on stage.

In 1915 she married Joseph Augustas Rouverol (Rouveyrol) They had two children, including actress and author Jean Rouverol (1916–2017).

Aurania divorced Joseph, and remarried in 1946 to Reverend William Fleetwood.

In 1955 she died in Palo Alto, California, at age 68.

== Select writings ==
- Skidding (1928) – play
- It Never Rains (1929) – play
- Dance, Fools, Dance (1931) – film, dialogue
- Growing Pains (1933) – play
- All in Marriage (1935) – play
- Places Please! (1937) – play
