= Casey at the Bat (1927 film) =

1927 film by Monte Brice

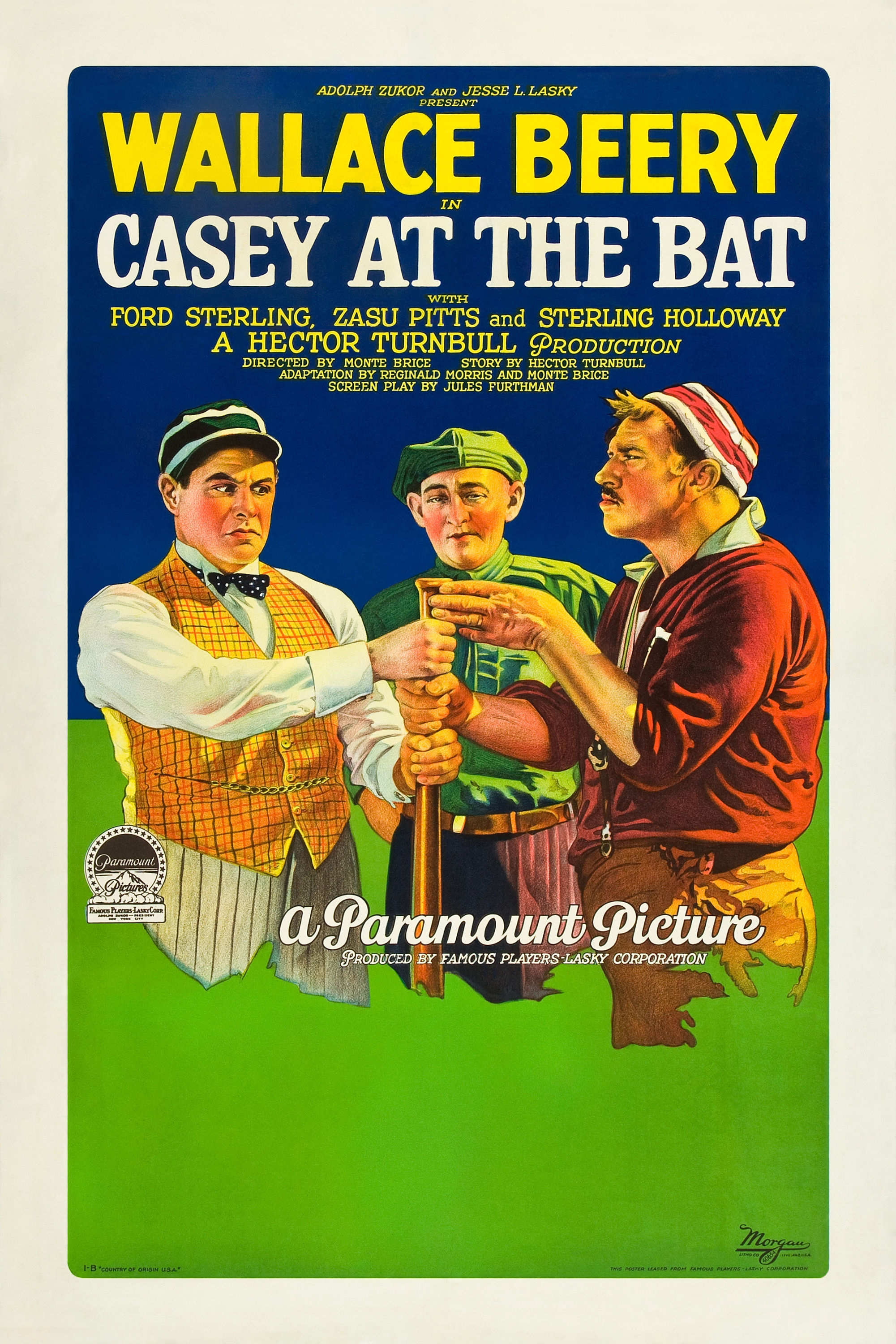
- Theatrical release poster
- Directed by: Monte Brice
- Written by: Monte Brice; Reggie Morris; Jules Furthman
- Based on: "Casey at the Bat" by Ernest Thayer
- Produced by: Hector Turnbull
- Starring: Wallace Beery; Ford Sterling; Zasu Pitts; Sterling Holloway
- Cinematography: Barney McGill
- Distributed by: Paramount Pictures
- Release date: March 8, 1927
- Running time: 60 minutes
- Country: United States
- Language: Silent (English intertitles)

Casey at the Bat (1927)

Casey at the Bat is a 1927 American silent film, directed by Monte Brice. It is based on the 1888 baseball poem "Casey at the Bat" by Ernest Thayer.

Casey at the Bat stars Wallace Beery, Ford Sterling, ZaSu Pitts and Sterling Holloway in his film debut. Surviving period advertisements indicate Eddie Sutherland may have been slated as director before Brice. A copy of the film is preserved at the Library of Congress.

== Plot ==
Casey at the Bat follows Casey, a junk dealer at the beginning of the 20th century in the village of Centerville. He is also the big hitter on the amateur baseball team. Casey is in a relations with a girl named Camille. Elmer Putnam, the town barber, is on the same team and also attracted to Camille. A man named O'Dowd arrives in Centerville, claiming to be a scout for the baseball major leagues.

At Putnam's urging, O'Dowd persuades the New York Giants baseball team in New York City to sign Casey to a contract. Casey quickly proves to be an effective batter. As he becomes more popular, Casey starts indulging in the nightlife of the city. He buys rounds of drinks for everyone in bars, paid by Putnam. One evening, he becomes enamored by Trixie, a performer in the Florodora Sextette, and invites all the girls to dinner. After eating and consuming many drinks, the party goes to Coney Island in Brooklyn. They get on a ride at an amusement park there, with comedic results.

Casey later meets with Camille at a beer garden and apologizes to her for his behavior. At the ball game, some conspirators try to make Casey look bad, but they are foiled.

== Cast ==
- Wallace Beery as Casey
- Ford Sterling as O'Dowd
- ZaSu Pitts as Camille
- Sterling Holloway as Elmer Putnam
- Spec O'Donnell as Spec
- Iris Stuart as Trixie, a Florodora girl
- Sydney Jarvis as McGraw
- Lotus Thompson as a Florodora girl
- Rosalind Byrne as a Florodora girl
- Sally Blane as a Florodora girl

== See also ==
- Breaking into the Big League (1913)
- Babe Comes Home (1927)
- List of baseball films
- Filmography of Wallace Beery
