= Pirate Gold =

Pirate Gold typically refers to buried treasure in pirate lore. It may also refer to:

- The Pirate's Gold, a 1908 silent film
- Pirate Gold (1913 film), starring Harry Carey
- Pirate Gold (1920 serial), a film serial directed by George B. Seitz
- Donald Duck Finds Pirate Gold, 1942 comic book story
