= Marguerite Courtot =

American actress (1897–1986)

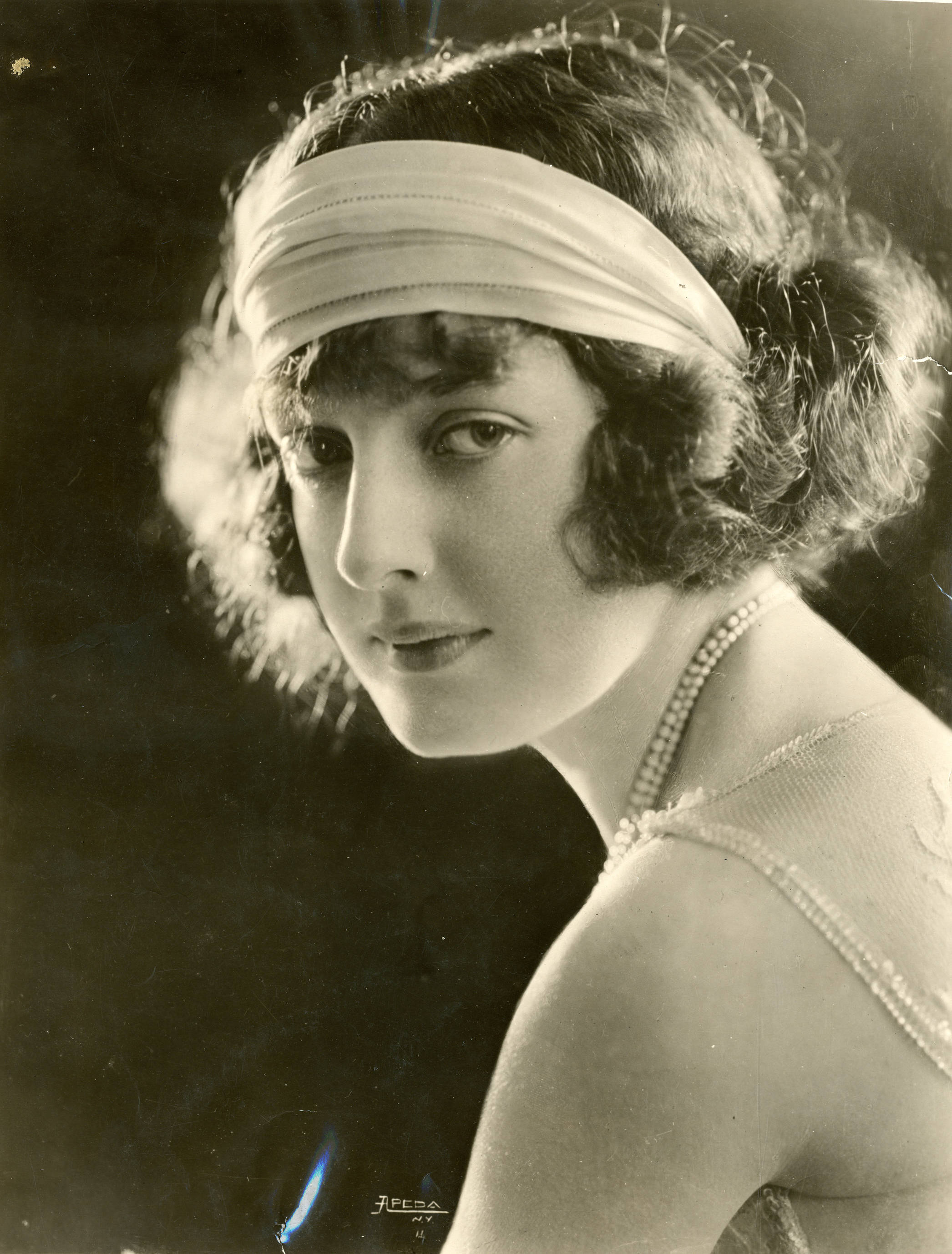
- Courtot in 1923
- Born: August 20, 1897; Summit, New Jersey, U.S.
- Died: May 28, 1986 (aged 88); Long Beach, California, U.S.
- Other name: Miss Courtot
- Years active: 1913–1924
- Spouse: Raymond McKee (m. 1923; died 1984)
- Children: 1

Marguerite Gabrielle Courtot (English: /kʊərˈtoʊ/ koor-TOH, French: [maʁɡəʁit kuʁto]; August 20, 1897 – May 28, 1986) was an American silent film actress.

== Early life ==
Marguerite Gabrielle Courtot was born in Summit, New Jersey, on August 20, 1897 to Gustave Courtot, who was born in France, and Charlotte Marie Courtot (née Kramer), who was born in Switzerland, and later followed in her daughter's footsteps in becoming an actress. Gustave arrived in America in 1887, and Charlotte one year later. The two married in Manhattan on July 7, 1890, and Marguerite's sister, Juliette, was born two and a half months later. Marguerite was of French and German descent.

Courtot received her education in New York and Switzerland.

== Career ==
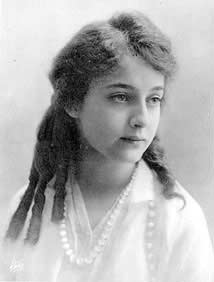
Courtot in 1915

Courtot became a child model and in June 1912, while not yet fifteen years old, joined the Kalem Company, appearing in 1913's The Riddle of the Tin Soldier alongside star Alice Joyce and Harry F. Millarde, who was making his film debut. Between then and 1916, Courtot made 37 films for Kalem, playing the starring role in The Ventures of Marguerite, a 16-episode action/adventure serial.

Following the Kalem Company's merger with Vitagraph Studios, Courtot starred in the Gaumont Pictures production of The Dead Alive, directed by Henri J. Vernot. After several films with Jesse L. Lasky's Famous Players Film Company and smaller independents, Courtot took most of 1918 off to use her public persona to tour the country to promote America's World War I effort in Europe. When the war ended, she returned to film, joining Pathé. Although she had starring roles, she also worked in prominent secondary parts such as in the 1921 serials The Sky Ranger, starring June Caprice, and The Yellow Arm, starring Juanita Hansen.

== Marriage and retirement ==
In 1922, while working on Down to the Sea in Ships, the film that became her most important feature-length work, Marguerite Courtot began a relationship with co-star Raymond McKee, who was her childhood sweetheart. They married on April 23, 1923, and after she completed two more films, Courtot retired from the film business to raise a family with McKee. They had one child together, son Raymond Courtot McKee (June 25, 1926 – November 15, 2015). Courtot and McKee ran a successful restaurant in Los Angeles called The Zulu Hut and divided their time between homes in Honolulu and Long Beach. Their marriage lasted more than sixty years.

== Death ==
Her husband, Raymond McKee, died in 1984 and Marguerite Courtot died two years later in Long Beach, California. They are buried together in the Riverside National Cemetery in Riverside, California.

== Partial filmography ==
- Breaking into the Big League (1913)*short
- The Octoroon (1913)*short
- The Vampire (1913)
- A Celebrated Case (1914)
- Feathertop (1916)
- Crime and Punishment (1917)
- The Unbeliever (1918)
- The Perfect Lover (1919)
- Bound and Gagged (1919)
- The Undercurrent (1919)
- Pirate Gold (1920)
- Velvet Fingers (1920)
- Rogues and Romance (1920)
- The Yellow Arm (1921)
- Beyond the Rainbow (1922)
- The Cradle Buster (1922)
- Silas Marner (1922)
- Down to the Sea in Ships (1922)
- The Steadfast Heart (1923)
- Jacqueline (1923)
