= Rogues and Romance =

1920 film

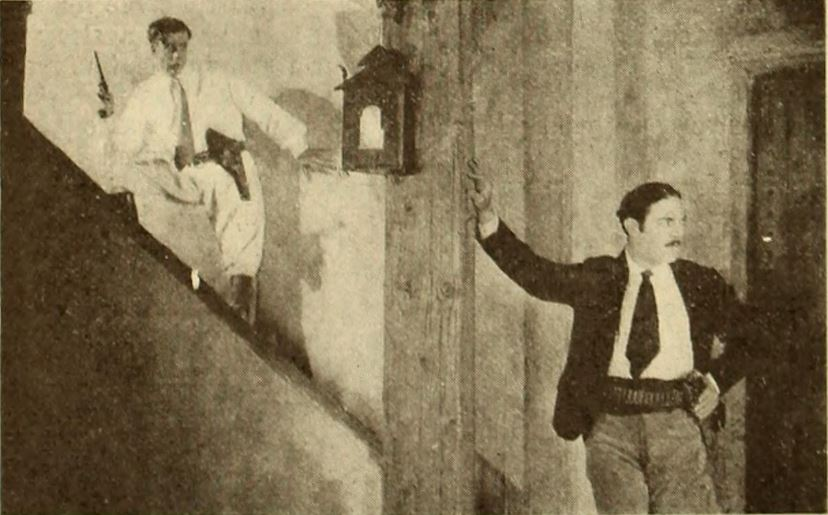
- Still from Rogues and Romance (1920)
- Directed by: George B. Seitz
- Written by: Frank Leon Smith
- Produced by: George B. Seitz
- Starring: Marguerite Courtot; June Caprice; George B. Seitz
- Distributed by: Pathé Exchange
- Release date: December 1920
- Country: United States
- Language: Silent film with English intertitles

Rogues and Romance is a surviving 1920 American silent drama film directed by George B. Seitz. The film was a feature-length version of the serial Pirate Gold, also directed by Seitz, and was shot in Europe. The film survives incomplete in the Library of Congress collection and George Eastman House Motion Picture Collection.

== Cast ==
- June Caprice as Sylvia Lee
- George B. Seitz as Reginald Van Ransen
- Harry Semels as Pedro Pezet
- Marguerite Courtot as Carmelita
- William P. Burt as Don Jose
- Frank Redman as Bartholomew Washington Stump

== See also ==
- List of incomplete or partially lost films
