= The Phantom Foe =

1920 film

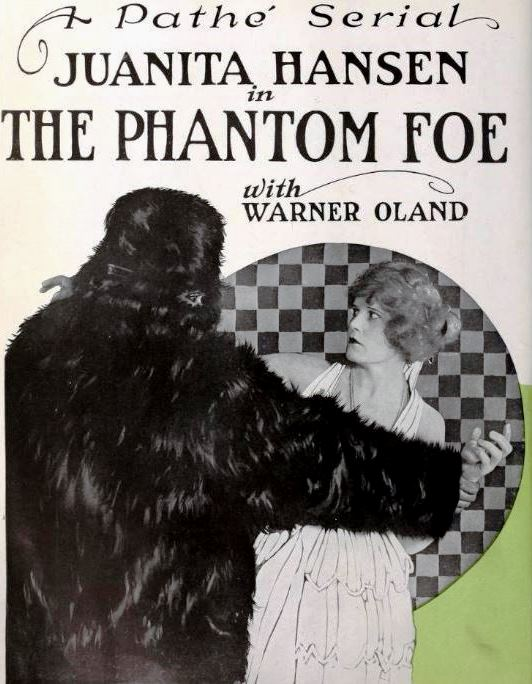
- Advertisement
- Directed by: Bertram Millhauser
- Written by: George B. Seitz; Frank Leon Smith
- Produced by: George B. Seitz
- Starring: Warner Oland; Juanita Hansen
- Distributed by: Pathé Exchange; Astra Films
- Release date: October 11, 1920
- Running time: 15 episodes
- Country: United States
- Language: Silent (English intertitles)

The Phantom Foe is a 1920 American fifteen-chapter adventure film serial directed by Bertram Millhauser and starring Warner Oland. A partial print of 14 episodes is in the George Eastman House Motion Picture Collection while the 15th episode is stored in the Library of Congress. The plot involves a villainous mesmerist played by Harry Semels.

== Plot ==
A film magazine described what happens in the first two episodes:

Episode 1, Doom: Fear of an unknown menace grips Janet Dale (Hansen) as she hears the measured tread of a giant's feet. Bob Royal (Bailey), her fiance, asks who it is she fears. She explains that her father Jeremiah Dale (Goodwin) had been the unwitting cause of the death of the wife and brother of her uncle Leo Selkirk (Oland) years before by bringing about a massacre for unjustly punishing three Indians. Selkirk had sworn vengeance upon Jeremiah Dale, but years had passed and he had seemingly forgotten his oath. She had barely finished speaking when a lighting fixture fell from the ceiling, barely missing her. At her twenty-first birthday party Janet was speaking to her father when he vanishes before her eyes. Bob Royal sees a muffled figure slinking along in the shadow of the house and tries to capture him, but the figure escapes. That night Janet, unable to sleep, wanders into the library. In the ashes of the fireplace she finds three links of a gold chain and the imprint of a giant's foot. Meditating on these things she fails to hear the approach of the muffled figure, bent on attacking her.

Episode 2, Disappearance of Janet Dale: The muffled figure attacks Janet, but is driven off by Bob Royal's approach. Later in the day Bob again sees the muffled figure. He grapples with the unknown person and a fight ensues with Bab being worsted when Steve Roycroft (McCutcheon), a scientific detective, and Janet arrive, causing the muffled figure to flee in an automobile. Janet finds a notebook belonging to her Uncle Leo. They return to the house and find Leo Selkirk, believed by Bob to be an enemy, and Janet's Cousin Esther (Cassavant). Leo admits ownership of the notebook and Bob believes his suspicions are being confirmed. On the following morning Janet's room is discovered empty. A note left by her says that it will be useless to try and find her. She had received a note saying that if she followed a designated man, she would be led to a place where she could find the answer to her puzzle. She is thus brought to a disreputable place and escorted to a dingy room. When she closes the door, the episode ends as she sees the muffled figure rise from a seat in the corner and advance towards her.

== Cast ==
- Warner Oland as Uncle Leo Selkirk
- Juanita Hansen as Janet Dale
- Wallace McCutcheon Jr. as Steve Roycroft
- William Bailey as Bob Royal (credited as William Norton Bailey)
- Nina Cassavant as Esther, Janet's Cousin
- Tom Goodwin as Jeremiah Dale (credited as Thomas Goodwin)
- Harry Semels as The Phantom Foe
- Joe Cuny as Andre Renoir
- Al Franklin Thomas

== Chapter titles ==
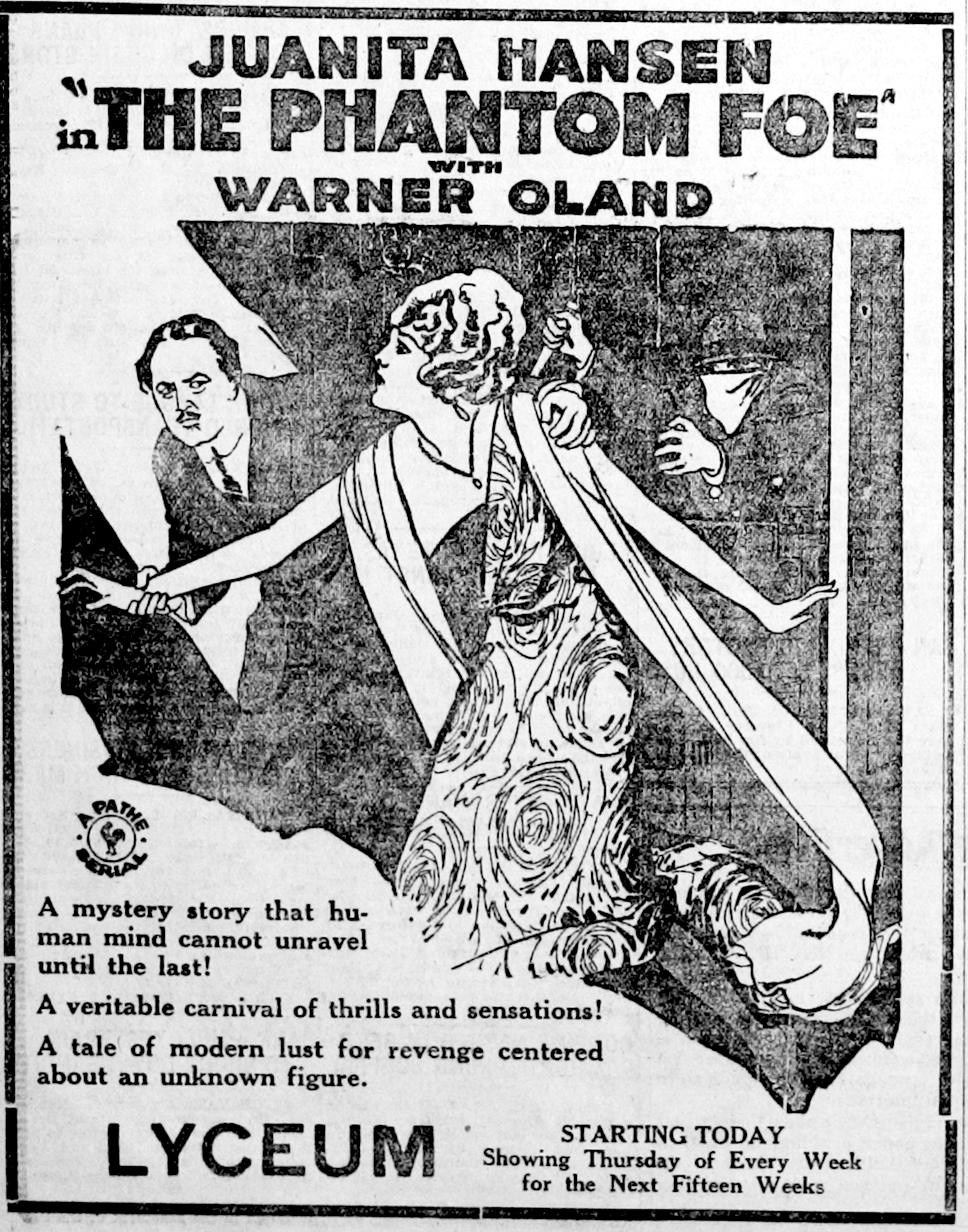
Newspaper ad for the serial

1. Doom
2. Disappearance of Janet Dale
3. Trail of the Wolf
4. The Open Window
5. The Tower Room
6. The Crystal Ball
7. Gun Fire
8. The Man Trap
9. The Mystic Summons
10. The Foe Unmasked
11. Through Prison Walls
12. Behind the Veil
13. Attack at the Inn
14. Confession
15. Retribution

== See also ==
- List of film serials
- List of film serials by studio
