= Kurtis Scaletta =

American writer

- Born: Shreveport, Louisiana, U.S.
- Occupation: Writer
- Writing career
- Period: 2005–present
- Genres: Young adult fiction, children's fiction, short story, essay
- Website: kurtisscaletta.com

Kurtis Scaletta is an American writer of fiction for children and young adults. He is known for his contemporary writing intermingled with light fantasy and humor. His first novel, Mudville (2009), is based on the poem "Casey at the Bat". He is also the author of Mamba Point (2010) and The Tanglewood Terror (2011). All three are published by Knopf.

== Biography ==
Born in Louisiana and raised in New Mexico, North Dakota, England, Liberia and Brazil. Scaletta has an M.A. in Curriculum and Instruction, Program in Learning Technologies, from the University of Minnesota; an M.A. in English literature (with an emphasis in creative writing) from the University of Maine; and a B.A. in English and Honors from the University of North Dakota. He lives in Minneapolis with his wife and son and their cats. He also manages the online education program for the Loft Literary Center in Minneapolis. He is an avid baseball fan, especially of the Minnesota Twins.

Scaletta began publishing short stories for young readers before his first novel was published. Mudville was named one of the Top 10 Sports Books for Youth in 2009 by Booklist Magazine, as well as being featured in Sports Illustrated Kids. Mamba Point received a starred review by Kirkus Reviews, as well as being featured in The New York Times Books Review, Booklist, The Washington Post and School Library Journal. His third novel, The Tanglewood Terror, was released in the fall of 2011. It was a Junior Library Guild selection and received the Readers' Choice Award at the 2012 Minnesota Book Awards.

== Publications ==
=== Novels ===
- 2009 — Mudville
- 2010 — Mamba Point
- 2011 — The Tanglewood Terror
- 2013 — The Winter of the Robots
- 2017 — Rooting for Rafael Rosales

=== Chapter books ===
- 2012 — Jinxed!, by Scaletta and Eric Wight
- 2012 — Steal That Base!, Scaletta and Wight
- 2012 — Zip It!, Scaletta and Wight
- 2012 — The 823rd Hit, Scaletta and Wight
- 2013 — "You're Out", by Ethen Beavers and Scaletta
- 2013 — "Batter Up", Beavers and Scaletta

=== Short fiction ===
- "Strophes of Lake Michigan", The Cricket Magazine Group, 2005
- "Swingtown", The Cricket Magazine Group, 2009

=== Essays ===
- "Bully on the Ledge", Dear Bully: 70 Authors Tell Their Stories, HarperTeen, 2011
