= Girl from the West =

1923 film

- Directed by: Wallace MacDonald
- Written by: Carter DeHaven
- Produced by: Sam Warner
- Starring: Jack Richardson; Juanita Hansen; A. Edward Sutherland
- Production company: Sam Warner Productions
- Distributed by: Aywon Film Corporation
- Release date: September 1923
- Running time: 50 minutes
- Country: United States
- Languages: Silent; English intertitles

Girl from the West is a lost 1923 American silent Western film directed by Wallace MacDonald and starring Jack Richardson, Juanita Hansen and A. Edward Sutherland.

== Cast ==
- Jack Richardson
- Juanita Hansen
- A. Edward Sutherland

== Preservation ==
With no holdings located in archives, Girl from the West is considered a lost film.
