= The Mating of Marcella =

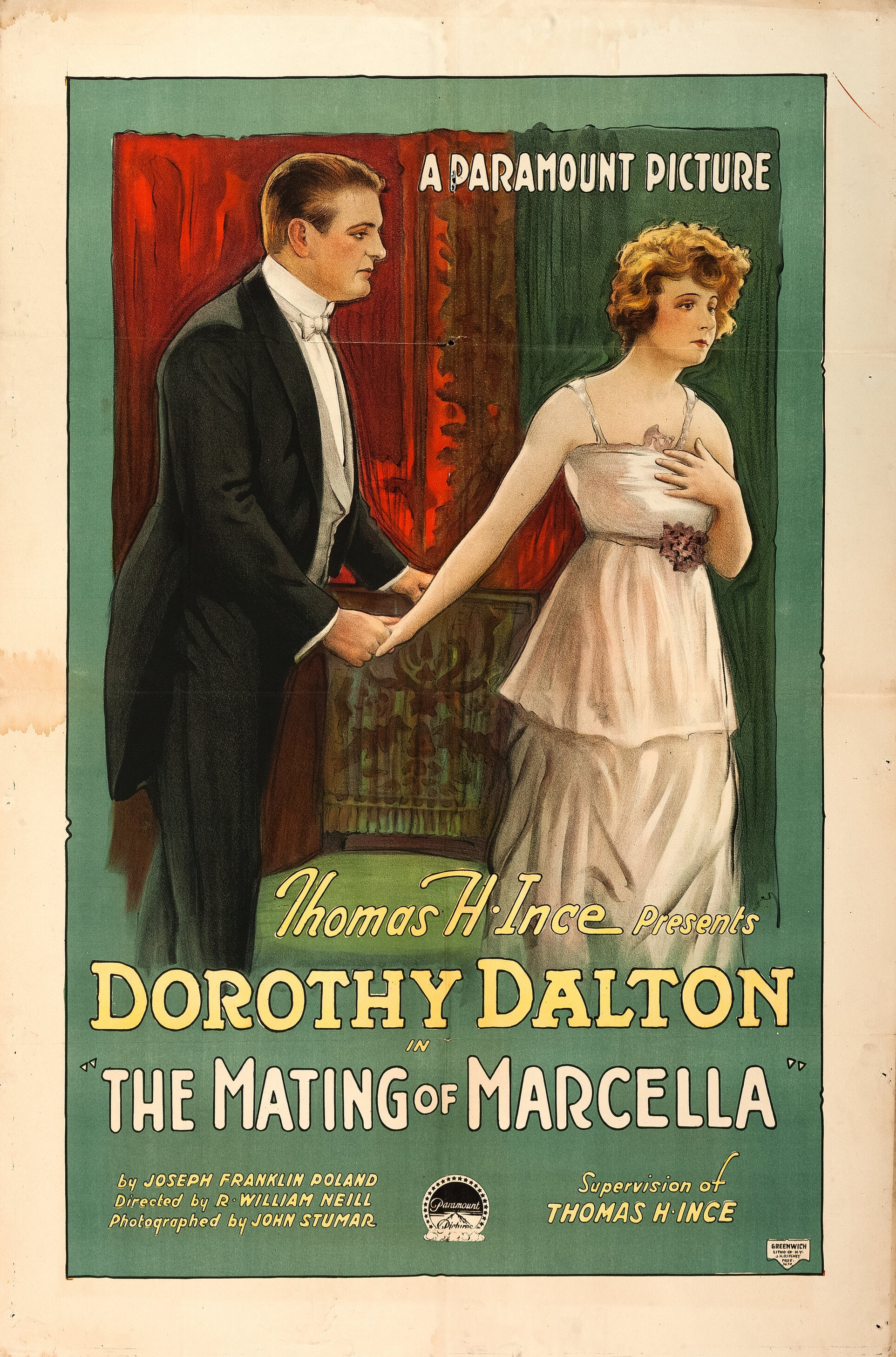
- Theatrical release poster
- Directed by: Roy William Neill
- Screenplay by: Joseph F. Poland; R. Cecil Smith
- Produced by: Thomas H. Ince
- Starring: Dorothy Dalton; Thurston Hall; Juanita Hansen; William Conklin; Donald MacDonald; Milton Ross
- Cinematography: John Stumar
- Production company: Thomas H. Ince Corporation
- Distributed by: Paramount Pictures
- Release date: May 20, 1918
- Running time: 50 minutes
- Country: United States
- Language: English

The Mating of Marcella is a lost 1918 American drama silent film directed by Roy William Neill, and written by Joseph F. Poland and R. Cecil Smith. The film stars Dorothy Dalton, Thurston Hall, Juanita Hansen, William Conklin, Donald MacDonald and Milton Ross. The film was released on May 20, 1918, by Paramount Pictures.

== Plot ==
Struggling to support herself and her ailing father, fashion model Marcella Duranzo accepts $1,000 from Lois Underwood to take her place in Reno while Lois travels with her lover, Count Louis Le Favri, and plans to divorce her millionaire husband, Robert. Robert discovers the deception and falls in love with Marcella after she nurses his son Bobby through a serious illness. Meanwhile, Lois begins an affair with Jack Porter and prepares to name Marcella in her divorce suit. Jealous of Lois's new relationship, the count drives Lois, Jack and himself into an oncoming train. Marcella agrees to marry Robert.

== Cast ==
- Dorothy Dalton as Marcella Duranzo
- Thurston Hall as Robert Underwood
- Juanita Hansen as Lois Underwood
- William Conklin as Count Louis Le Favri
- Donald MacDonald as Jack Porter
- Milton Ross as Pedro Escobar
- Spottiswoode Aitken as Jose Duranzo
- Buster Irving as Bobby Underwood
