= Down to the Sea in Ships (1922 film) =

1922 movie by Elmer Clifton

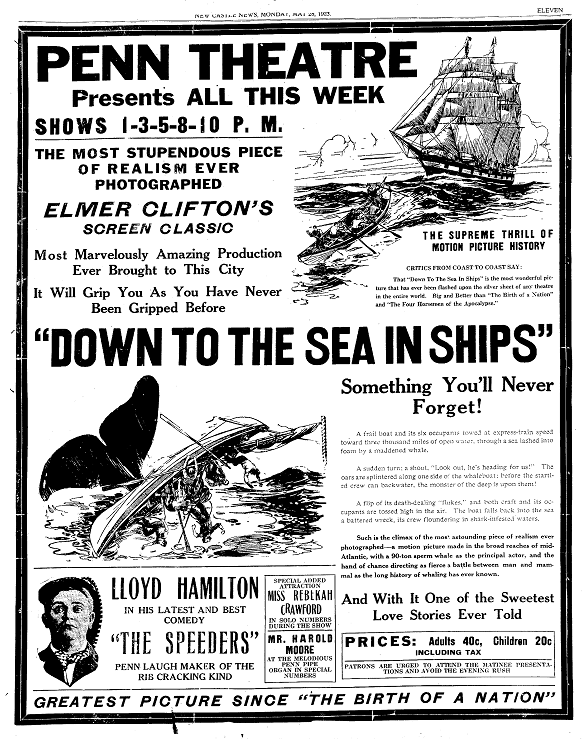
- Newspaper ad for Penn Theater in New Castle, Pennsylvania
- Directed by: Elmer Clifton
- Written by: John L.E. Pell
- Produced by: Elmer Clifton
- Starring: William Walcott; Marguerite Courtot; Raymond McKee; Clara Bow
- Cinematography: Paul H. Allen; A.G. Penrod
- Music by: Henry F. Gilbert (uncredited)
- Distributed by: W. W. Hodkinson Corporation
- Release date: November 22, 1922
- Running time: 85 minutes
- Country: United States
- Language: Silent (English intertitles)

Down to the Sea in Ships is a 1922 American silent romantic drama film about a 19th-century Massachusetts whaling family. Directed by Elmer Clifton, the film stars William Walcott, Marguerite Courtot, and Clara Bow. The film's title comes from Psalm 107, verses 23–24.

Full film

== Plot ==
Captain William W. Morgan is a well-respected businessman who owns a fleet of whaling ships in the Quaker town of New Bedford, Massachusetts. He is very close to his shy, obedient daughter, Patience, and tells her that she must marry a man who is a whaler and a Quaker, like him. His son and daughter-in-law were lost ten years before while on a whaling expedition; eventually, their baby, his granddaughter Dot, was found "in a chest on a raft bundled in sail cloth." He has raised her ever since. Dot is a mischievous, rebellious child, who wants to be a whaler when she grows up, an ambition that is not acceptable for a female among her people.

One day, Allan Dexter, a childhood friend of Patience's, arrives in town, recently back from college. He and Patience renew their acquaintance and fall in love. He asks Captain Morgan for permission to marry Patience, but Morgan turns him out of the house, informing him that he is not a suitable husband for her because he is neither a Quaker nor a whaler.

Meanwhile, Samuel Siggs, an effeminate Chinese man masquerading as a white man, connives to steal Captain Morgan's ships to transport African gold. He dresses up as a Quaker and acquires a position of authority in Morgan's business by pretending to be an experienced whaler. After spying Morgan's pretty daughter Patience, he also plans to finagle his way into marrying her. Learning of Dexter's love for her, he has his fellow con artist Jake Finner, "fearless, lawless and godless", drug the young man's drink and has him kidnapped, tied up, and placed on the next outgoing whaling vessel, hoping never to see him again. Also on the ship is Dot, who has dressed as a boy and stowed away below deck. Because of their disappearance, it is rumored that Dexter and Dot have joined the Oregon Wagon Train and gone west together.

Miles out to sea, Dexter is untied and immediately put to work. Wanting to prove himself to Morgan, he decides to put all his effort into working long hard hours to win his chance to harpoon a whale, which would make him an accomplished whalesman. Meanwhile, Jake Finner, who has killed the captain and taken over the ship, finds Dot, discovers she is a girl, and attacks her. Because he has been treating the men on board like slaves, they mutiny against Finner, appointing Dexter as captain, while Dot's friend Jimmie, the cabin boy, rescues her from Finner's clutches.

After harpooning a whale and learning why he was shanghaied, Dexter arranges to have the vessel return to port. Meanwhile, Captain Morgan has fallen ill, fears that he is dying, and commands Patience to marry Siggs as his last wish. She reluctantly agrees. Dexter arrives just in time to save Patience, and the lovers are reunited at the end.

== Cast ==
- William Walcott as Captain William W. Morgan
- Marguerite Courtot as Patience
- Raymond McKee as Allan Dexter
- Clara Bow as Dot
- James Turfler as Jimmy
- J. Thornton Baston as Samuel Siggs
- Patrick Hartigan as Jake Finner

== Production ==
Swedish poster (1923)

The film contains semi-documentary footage of whalers at work, and was shot on historic locations in Massachusetts, New England, most notably in New Bedford, and at the Apponegansett Meeting House and Elihu Akin House in Dartmouth. The film's title cards are notable for having quotes from Herman Melville's Moby-Dick and Alexander Starbuck's History of the American Whale Fishery.

The authenticity of the whaling scenes are noted in the opening screen credits, which praise the bravery of both A.G. Penrod and Paul H. Allen, the cameramen, "who, in small boats, stood by their cameras at the risk of their lives to photograph the fighting whales."

The Charles W. Morgan was one of the whaling ships used in the film.

== Reception ==
The film's premiere was September 25, 1922 at the Olympia Theater in New Bedford, Massachusetts and was in general distribution from March 4, 1923.

It was very popular with audiences, playing for 22 weeks straight in New York City. Critics gave it low marks, but several went out of their way to praise Bow's performance.

== Trivia ==
in 1949, Twentieth Century Fox released a separate film titled Down to the Sea in Ships, directed by Henry Hathaway, starring Richard Widmark, Lionel Barrymore and Dean Stockwell. Other than sharing its title, it bears no relation to the 1922 film.
