= Jacqueline (1923 film) =

1923 film directed by Dell Henderson

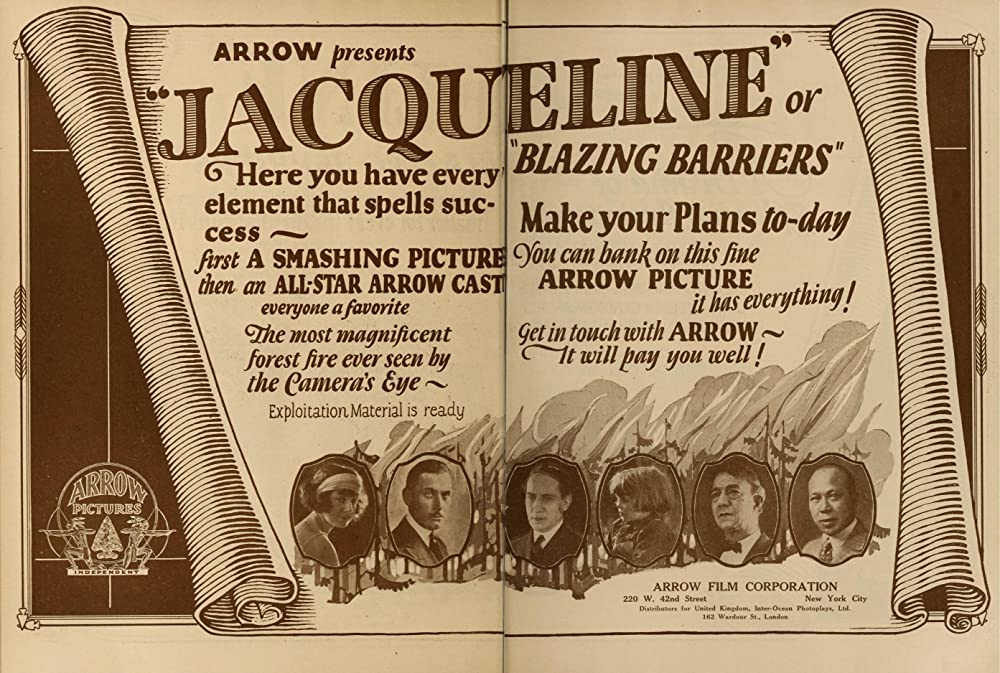
- Directed by: Dell Henderson
- Written by: Thomas F. Fallon; Dorothy Farnum
- Based on: Jacqueline by James Oliver Curwood
- Starring: Marguerite Courtot; Lew Cody; Edmund Breese
- Cinematography: Charles Downs; Dan Maher; George Peters
- Production company: Pine Tree Pictures
- Distributed by: Arrow Film Corporation
- Release date: March 19, 1923
- Running time: 70 minutes
- Country: United States
- Languages: Silent; English intertitles

Jacqueline (also known as Blazing Barriers) is a 1923 American silent northern adventure drama film directed by Dell Henderson and starring Marguerite Courtot, Lew Cody and Edmund Breese. It is based on a 1918 short story of the same title by James Oliver Curwood. It takes place amongst those working in the lumber industry in Quebec.

== Cast ==
- Marguerite Courtot as Jacqueline Roland
- Helen Rowland as Jacqueline, as a child
- Gus Weinberg as Her Father
- Effie Shannon as Her Mother
- Lew Cody as Raoul Radon
- Joseph Depew as Raoul Radon, as a child
- Russell Griffin as Little Peter
- J. Barney Sherry as His Father
- Edmund Breese as Edmund MacDonald
- Edria Fisk as His Daughter
- Sheldon Lewis as Henri Dubois
- Charles Fang as Li Chang
- Paul Panzer as Gambler

== Bibliography ==
- Munden, Kenneth White. The American Film Institute Catalog of Motion Pictures Produced in the United States, Part 1. University of California Press, 1997.
