= The Unbeliever =

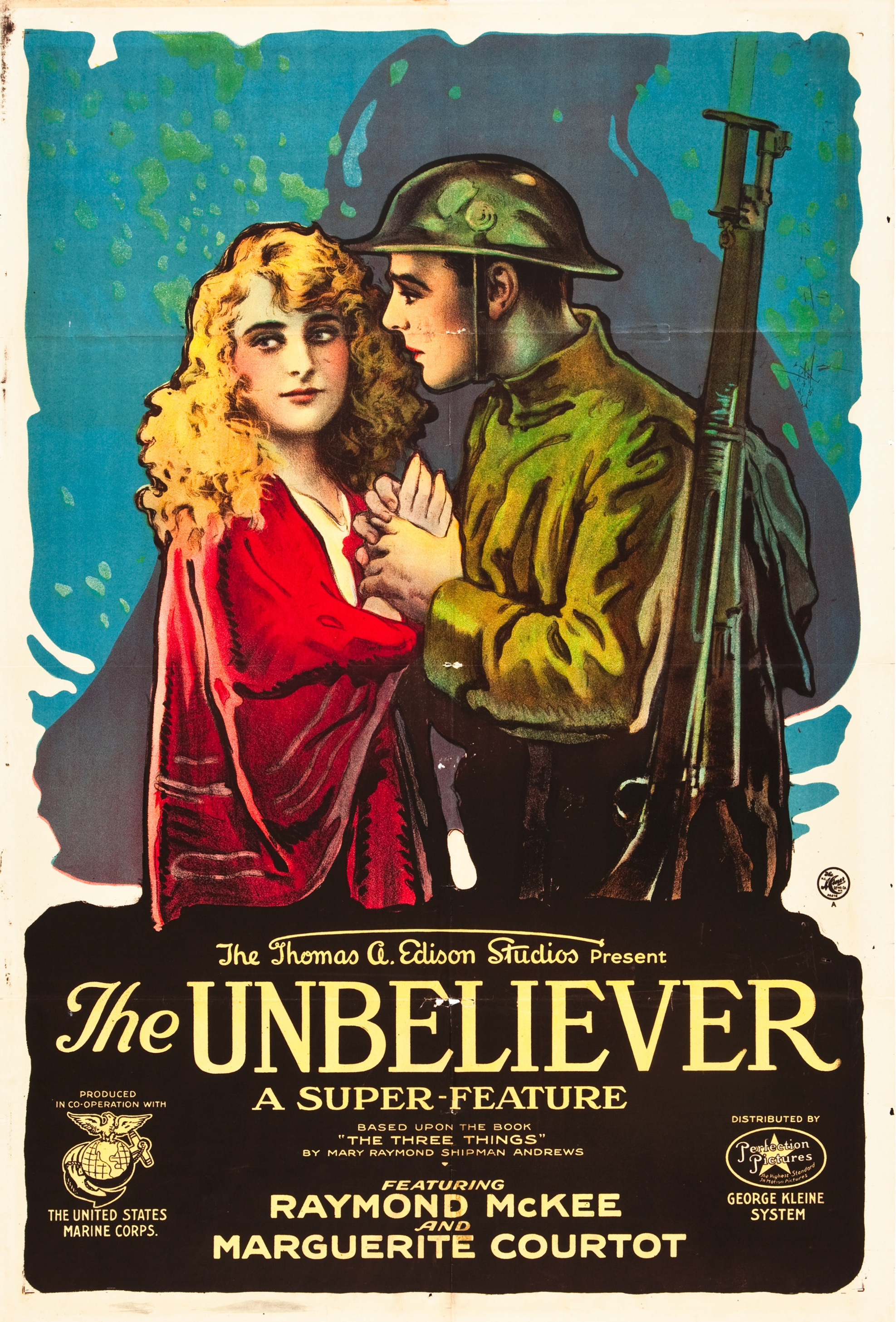
- Movie poster
- Directed by: Alan Crosland
- Based on: The Three Things by Mary Raymond Shipman
- Produced by: Edison Company; George Kleine
- Starring: Raymond McKee; Marguerite Courtot
- Cinematography: Philip Tannura
- Music by: J. Warde Hutton
- Production company: Edison Company
- Distributed by: George Kleine
- Release date: February 11, 1918
- Running time: 80 minutes
- Country: United States
- Language: Silent (English intertitles)

The Unbeliever is a 1918 American silent propaganda film made towards the end of World War I. It was directed by Alan Crosland for the Edison Company towards its last days as a functioning film-making company. It stars Raymond McKee and Marguerite Courtot, who married a few years later, and Erich von Stroheim.

== Plot ==
The Unbeliever (1918)

As described in a film magazine, Philip Landicutt has always held the people of the lower classes as being far beneath him. He also is prejudiced against anyone with German blood and does not believe in God. He joins the Marine Corps and goes to France where constant association with the men in his battery and nearly answering the call from above during an action makes him see things differently. He returns home, crippled, but with a better knowledge of man and God. During a raid he rescued a Belgian girl who is later sent to stay with his mother. When he comes home and sees her, he finds himself in love.

== Cast ==
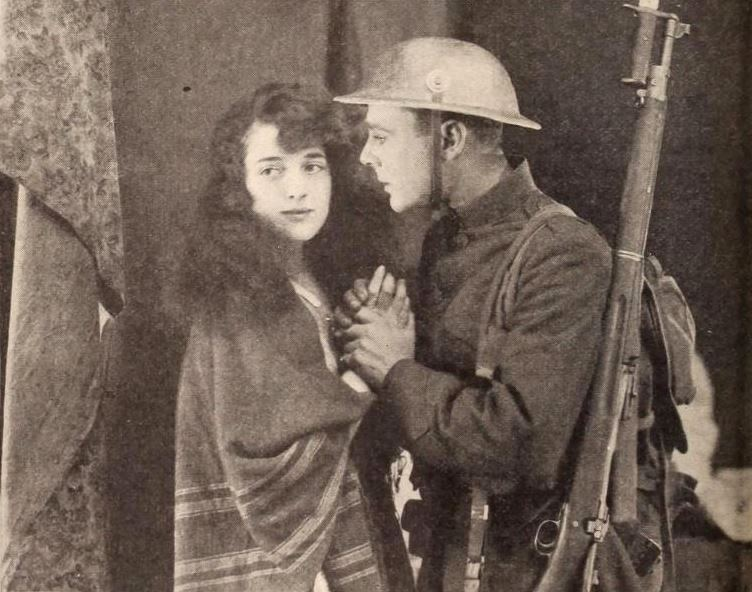
Scene with Marguerite Courtot and Raymond McKee

- Marguerite Courtot as Virginie Harbrok
- Raymond McKee as Philip Landicutt
- Erich von Stroheim as Lieutenant Kurt von Schnieditz
- Kate Lester as Margaret Landicutt
- Frank de Vernon as Uncle "Jemmy" Landicutt
- Mortimer Martine as Eugene Harbrok (credited as Mortimer Martini)
- Blanche Davenport as Madam Harbrok
- Harold Hollacher as Pierre Harbrok (credited as Harold Hallacher)
- Darwin Karr as "Lefty"
- Earl Schenck as Emanuel Muller
- Gertrude Norman as Marianne Marnholm
- Lew Hart as Hoffman
- Thomas Holcomb as The Commanding Officer (credited as Major Thomas Holcomb)
- Lieutenant J. F. Rorke as Lieutenant Terence O'Shaughnessy
- Sergeant Moss Gill as Albert Mullins
- Major Ross E. Rowell
- Captain Thomas Sterett
- Percy Webb
- Corporal Bob Ryland

== Reception ==
Like many American films of the time, The Unbeliever was subject to cuts by city and state film censorship boards. For example, the Chicago Board of Censors required a cut, in Reel 4, of executing a woman and child and two views of man pulling young woman's waist down.

== Preservation ==
A print is preserved at the Library of Congress. As a still-surviving feature from Edison, The Unbeliever can be found on Kino's omnibus of Edison Company shorts and features; it is the last film on the final DVD. with a new score by Donald Sosin. Alpha Video also has released a DVD version.
