= Breaking into the Big League =

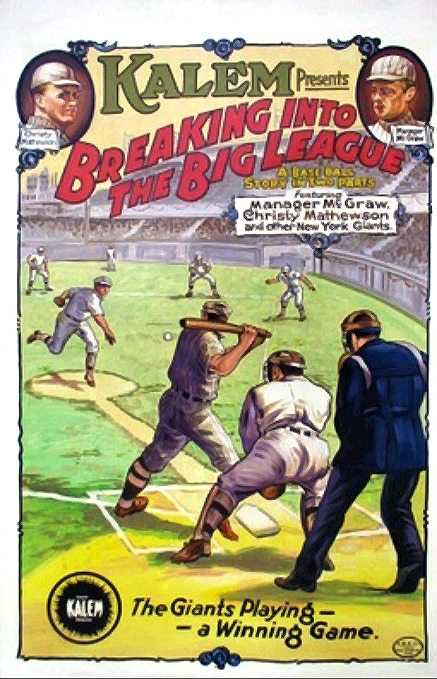
- Film poster
- Produced by: Kalem Company
- Starring: Harry Millarde; Marguerite Courtot
- Distributed by: General Film Company
- Release date: August 20, 1913
- Running time: 2 reels
- Country: United States
- Language: Silent (English titles)

Breaking into the Big League is a lost 1913 silent dramatic short film about baseball. It was produced by the Kalem Company and released through the General Film Company. This film is 2 reels in length and stars Harry Millarde and Marguerite Courtot.

It was filmed in Marlin, Texas and released in two parts.

== Cast ==
- Harry Millarde - Montjoy Jones
- Marguerite Courtot - Mamie Wallace
- Henry Hallam - Mr. Wallace, Mamie's Father
- John J. McGraw - Himself
- Christy Mathewson - Himself

== See also ==
- Casey at the Bat (1927)
- Babe Comes Home (1927)
- List of baseball films
