= The Yellow Arm =

1921 film

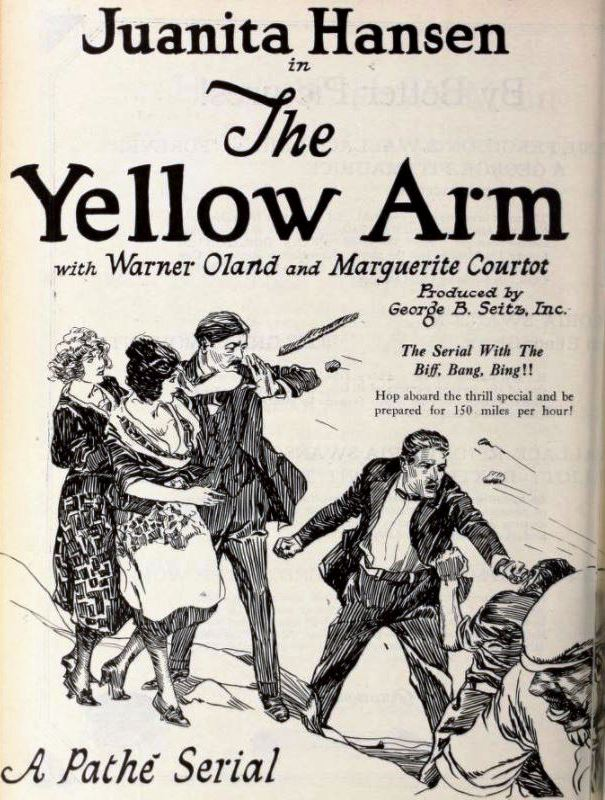
- Directed by: Bertram Millhauser
- Written by: James Shelley Hamilton
- Produced by: George B. Seitz
- Starring: Juanita Hansen; Warner Oland; Marguerite Courtot
- Production company: George B. Seitz Productions
- Distributed by: Pathé Exchange
- Release date: June 19, 1921
- Running time: 15 episodes
- Country: United States
- Languages: Silent; English intertitles

The Yellow Arm is a 1921 American silent action serial directed by Bertram Millhauser and starring Juanita Hansen, Warner Oland and Marguerite Courtot.

== Cast ==
- Juanita Hansen as Suzanne Valette
- Warner Oland as Joel Bain
- Marguerite Courtot as Doris Bain
- Stephen Carr as Jack Bain
- William Bailey as Jerry Engleson
- Tom Keith as Alan Marsh

== Bibliography ==
- Hans J. Wollstein. Strangers in Hollywood: the history of Scandinavian actors in American films from 1910 to World War II. Scarecrow Press, 1994.
