= Babe Comes Home =

1927 film by Ted Wilde

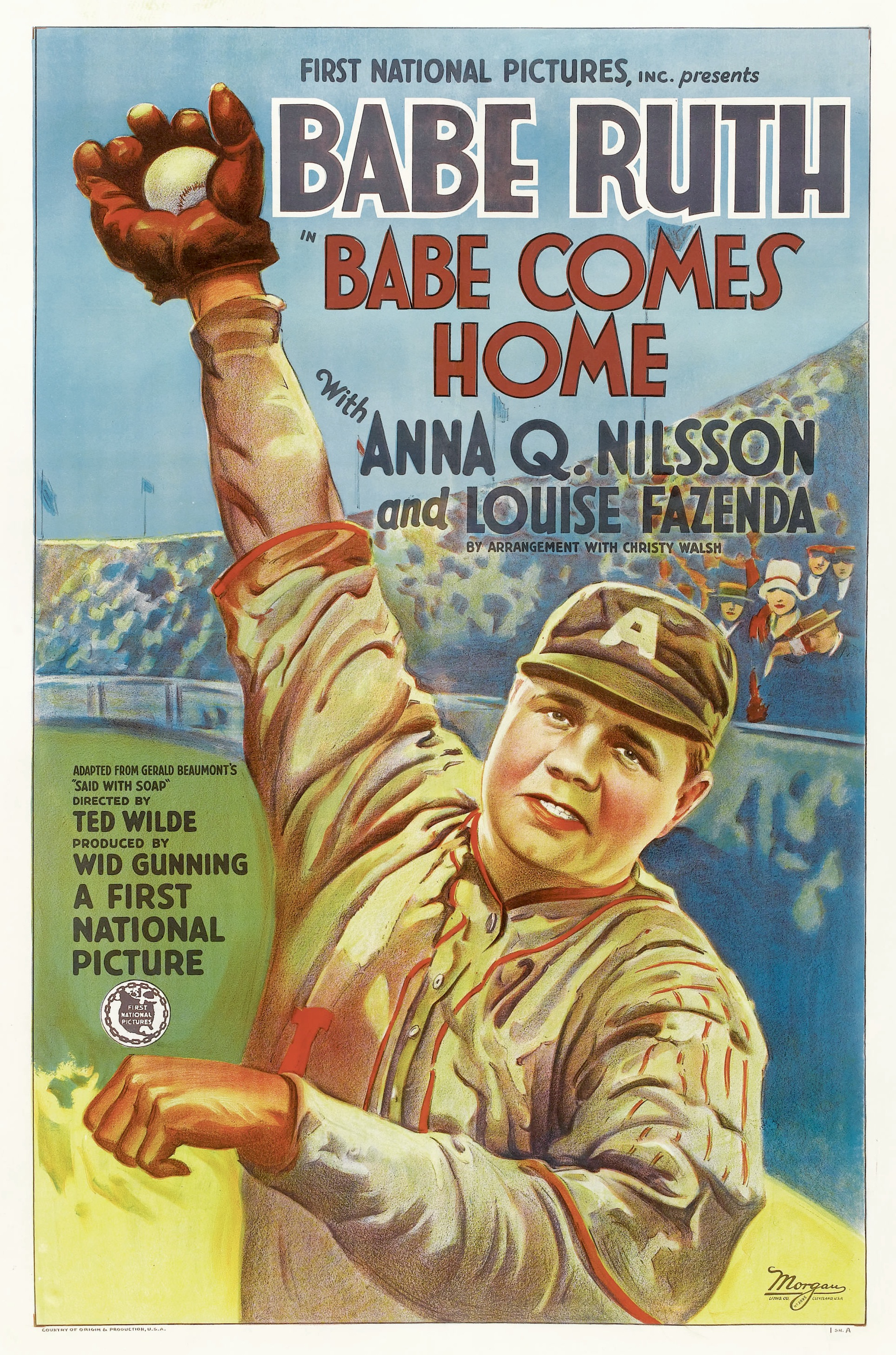
- Poster for film
- Directed by: Ted Wilde
- Written by: Louis Stevens (scenario)
- Based on: "Said With Soap" by Gerald Beaumont
- Produced by: Wid Gunning
- Starring: Babe Ruth; Anna Q. Nilsson
- Cinematography: Karl Struss
- Distributed by: First National Pictures
- Release date: May 22, 1927
- Running time: 60 minutes (6 reels, 5,761 feet)
- Country: United States
- Language: Silent (English intertitles)

Babe Comes Home is a 1927 American silent sports comedy film produced and distributed through First National and directed by Ted Wilde. The film is a baseball-styled sports film centering on Babe Ruth and Anna Q. Nilsson and was based on the short story "Said With Soap" by Gerald Beaumont.

The film was released in the short-lived Vocafilm sound-on-film process, presumably a music and effects soundtrack but with no dialogue. Babe Comes Home is considered to be a lost film.

== Synopsis ==
Babe Dugan, star player of the Angel baseball team, chews tobacco and gets his uniform dirtier than any other player. Vernie, the laundress who cleans his uniform every week, becomes concerned over his untidiness; Babe calls to apologize for unintentionally striking her with a ball during a game. Babe's pal, Peewee, falls in love with Vernie's friend, Georgia. On an outing to an amusement park, a roller coaster throws Vernie into Babe's arms; soon they are engaged, and Vernie plans to reform him. Scores of tobacco cubes and spittoons are pre-wedding gifts, and they precipitate a lovers' quarrel. But Babe takes the reform idea seriously, though his game slumps and he is put on the bench. At a crucial moment, Vernie relents and throws him a plug of tobacco; and consequently he delivers a four-base blow.

== Cast ==
- Babe Ruth as 'Babe' Dugan
- Anna Q. Nilsson as Vernie
- Ethel Shannon as Georgia
- Louise Fazenda as laundry girl
- Arthur Stone as the laundry driver
- Lou Archer as Peewee
- Tom McGuire as Angels team manager
- Mickey Bennett as mascot
- James Bradbury Jr. as ball player (as James Bradbury)
- Guinn 'Big Boy' Williams as a baseball player
- James Gordon as a baseball player
- Ralf Harolde as Baseball Fan (uncredited)
- Helen Parrish as Babe Dugan's daughter

== Production note ==
Filming of the baseball scenes took place at Wrigley Field in Los Angeles during February 1927. Ruth and his trainer Artie McGovern used the occasion to put Ruth in condition before the upcoming Yankees spring training schedule.[Los Angeles Times, February 27, 1927, p. 74]

== See also ==
- Breaking into the Big League (1913)
- Casey at the Bat (1927)
- Headin' Home (1920), also starring Babe Ruth
- List of baseball films
