= Bound and Gagged (serial) =

1919 film directed by George B. Seitz

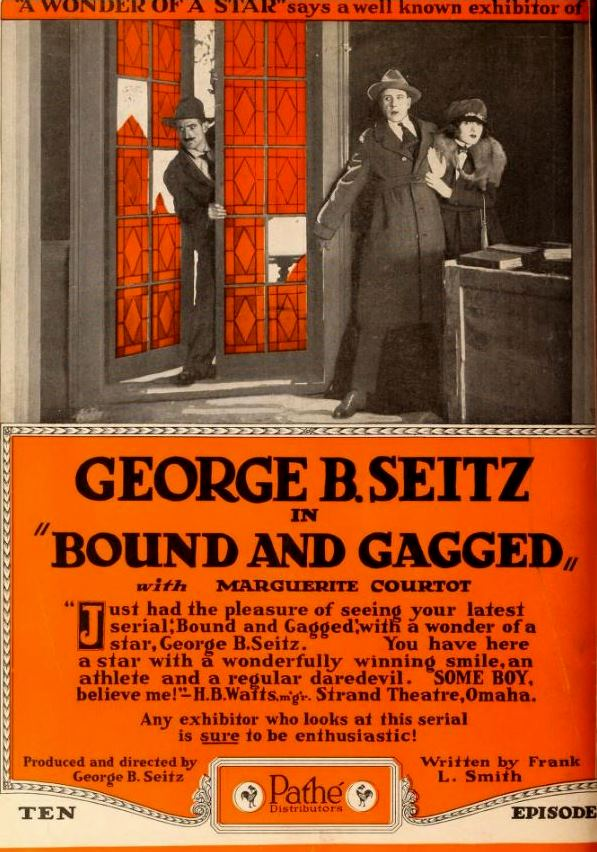
- Advertisement
- Directed by: George B. Seitz
- Written by: Frank Leon Smith
- Starring: Marguerite Courtot; George B. Seitz; Nellie Burt; Harry Semels; Frank Redman
- Production company: George B. Seitz Productions
- Distributed by: Pathé Exchange
- Release date: October 26, 1919
- Running time: 10 chapters
- Country: United States
- Language: Silent (English intertitles)

Bound and Gagged is a 1919 American silent film serial produced by George B. Seitz Productions and distributed by Pathé. It was a spoof of the clichéd melodramatic serials of the era.

It was shot in Fort Lee, New Jersey when many early film studios in America's first motion picture industry were based there at the beginning of the 20th century.

Four episodes survive in the Library of Congress film archive.

== Cast ==
- Marguerite Courtot as Princess Istra
- George B. Seitz as Archibald A. Barlow
- Nellie Burt as Margaret Hunter
- Harry Semels as Don Esteban Carnero
- Frank Redman as Roger Kipley
- John Reinhardt as Oscar Ben Glade
- Tom Goodwin as Willard Hunter
- Joe Cuny as Barcelona Ben
- Harry Stone
- Bert Starkey

== Chapter Titles ==
1. The Wager
2. Overboard
3. Help! Help!
4. An Unwilling Princess
5. Held For Ransom
6. Out Again, In Again
7. The Fatal Error
8. Arrested
9. A Harmless Princess
10. Hopley Takes The Liberty
