= Juanita Hansen =

American actress (1895–1961)

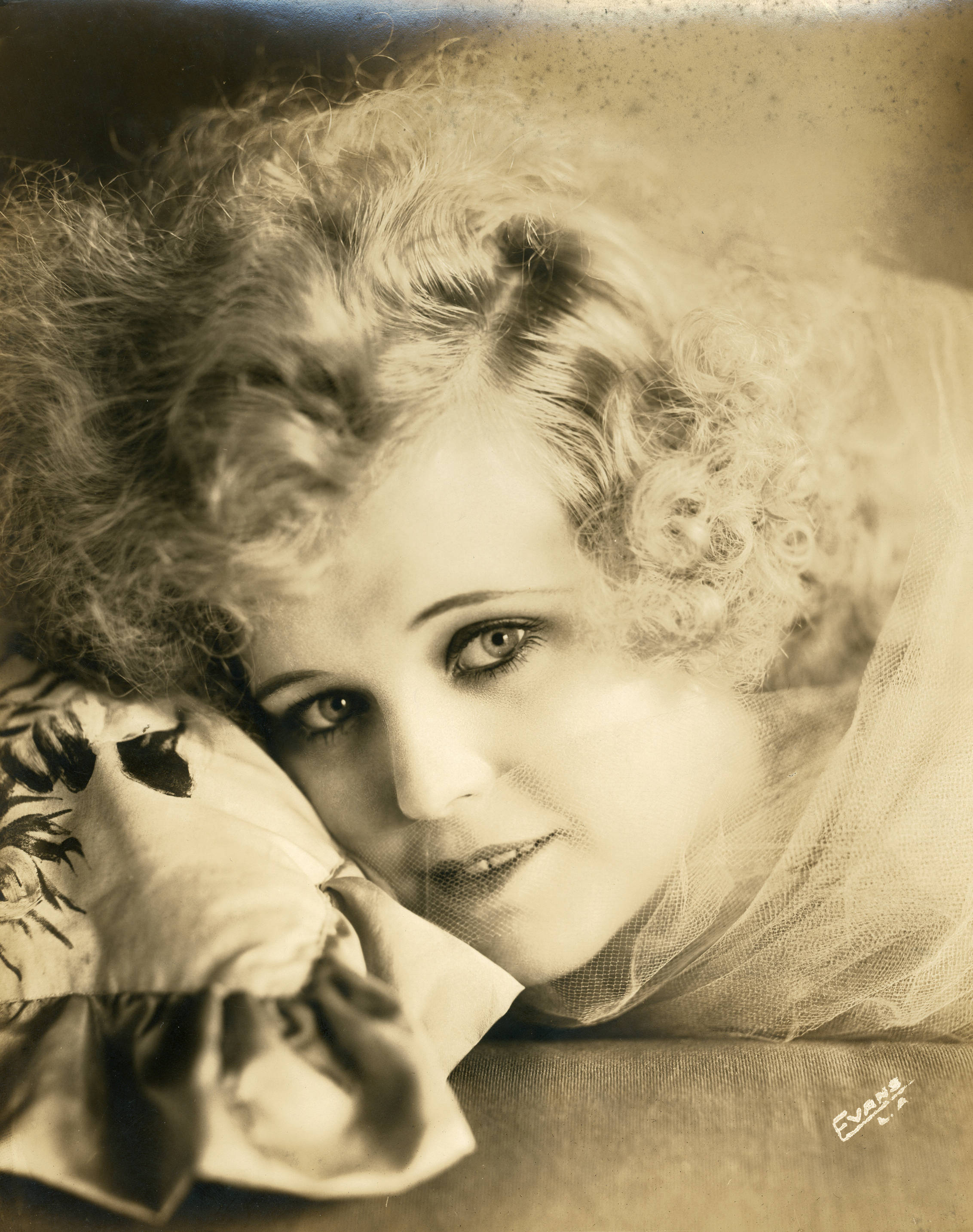
- Hansen in 1920
- Born: Juanita Cecilia Hanson; March 3, 1895; Thor, Iowa, U.S.
- Died: September 26, 1961 (aged 66); Los Angeles, California, U.S.
- Resting place: Holy Cross Cemetery, Culver City, California
- Occupations: Actress; author; speaker
- Years active: 1915–1933

Juanita Hansen (born Juanita Cecilia Hanson; March 3, 1895 – September 26, 1961) was an American actress who performed in silent films. She became one of the Sennett Bathing Beauties and appeared in a variety of serials through the late 1910s. She was well known for her troubled personal life and struggle with addiction to cocaine and morphine. In 1934, she became clean and traveled lecturing on the dangers of drugs. She wrote a book about addiction and started her own charity to help raise awareness about drug abuse.

== Early life ==
Juanita Cecilia Hanson was born in Thor, Iowa to Henry George Hanson, who was originally from Wisconsin, and Johanna Sophia Peterson (or Pederson) on March 3, 1895, or March 5, 1895 (sources differ). Alternatively, her birthplace has been given as Des Moines and her birth year as 1897. The family moved to California when Juanita was a young girl, and she attended Los Angeles High School, where she dropped out after completing 9th grade.

She began acting in films when she was 16, and she secured her first acting job with L. Frank Baum's Oz Film Manufacturing Company. She took on the name Juanita Hansen, and appeared in The Patchwork Girl of Oz (1914), a film based on Baum's book, in a minor role as the bell ringer. Hansen next appeared in The Magic Cloak of Oz, an adaptation of Queen Zixi of Ix.

Early in her career the actress was also associated with Famous Players–Lasky and acted with Jack Pickford. In 1915, Hansen appeared in six films. One of her early feature roles was in The Secret of the Submarine. The following year, her good looks landed her work as one of the Sennett Bathing Beauties doing comedy shorts at Keystone/Triangle Studios. Although she told reporters she liked working for Mack Sennett, she wanted to do more than slapstick comedy.

== Serial career ==
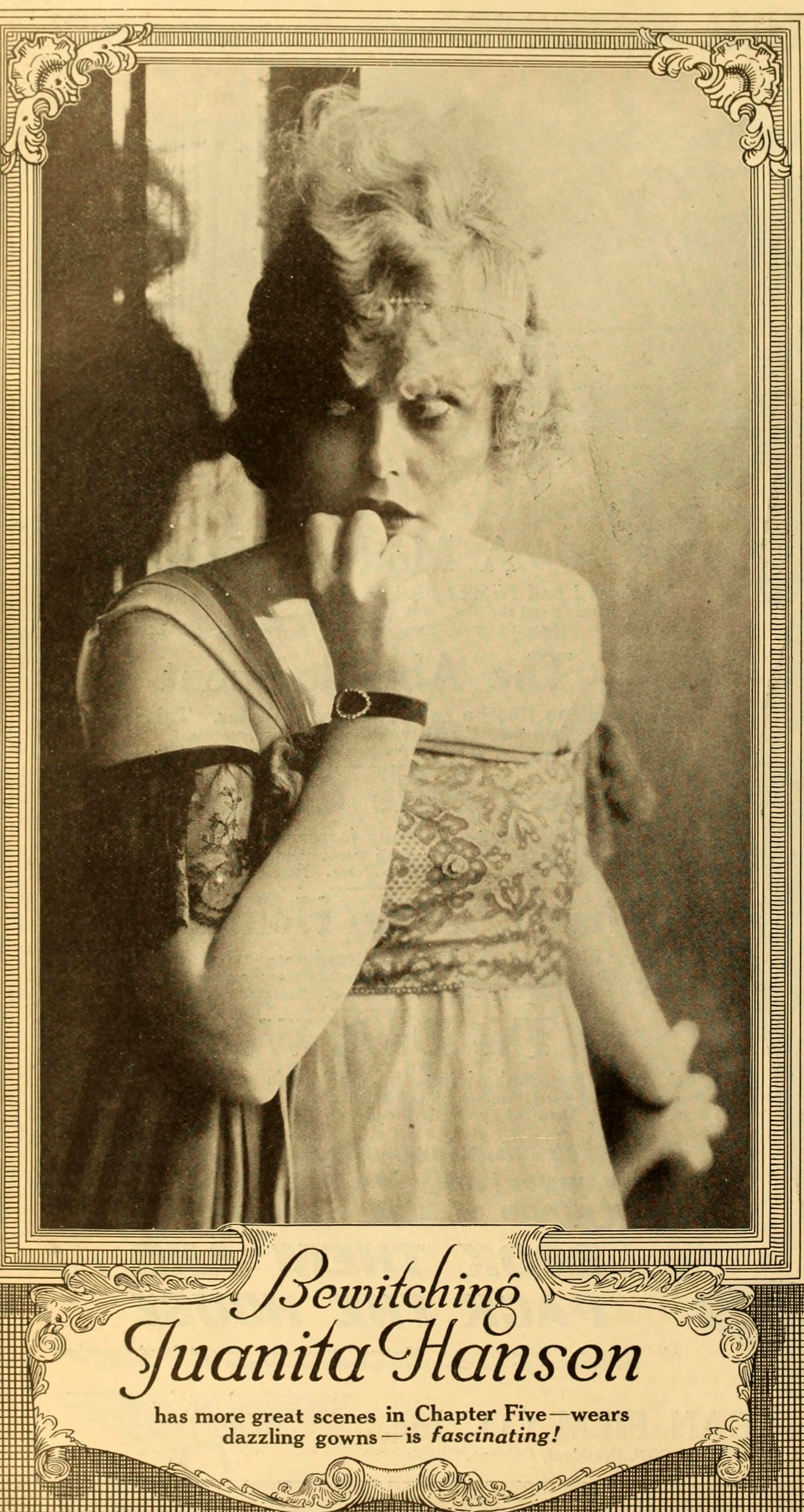
The Secret of the Submarine (1916)

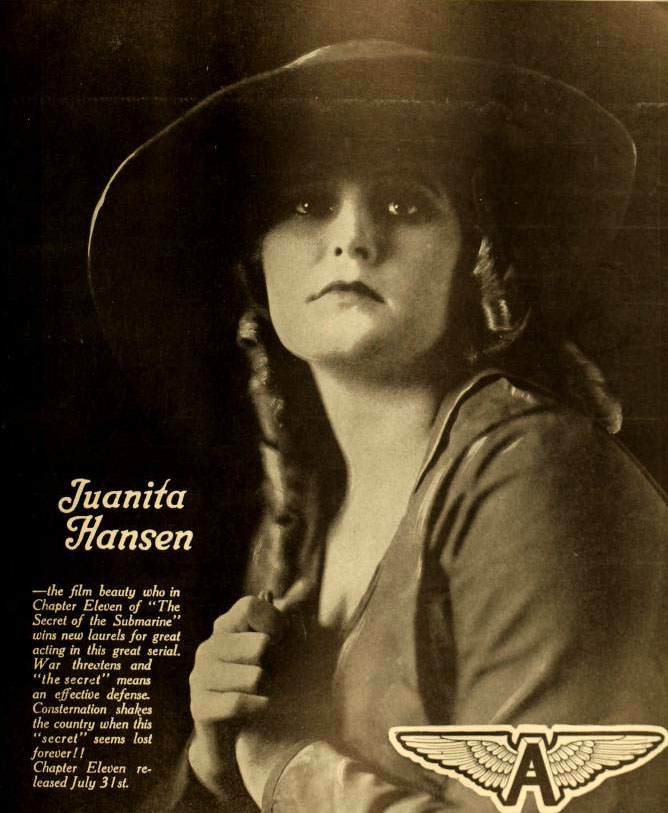
Advertisement (1916)

After Hansen left Keystone, she soon began playing serious roles for Universal Studios. She starred in the 18-episode serial The Brass Bullet. The actress made seven films in 1919. Soon she was cast in the starring role of Princess Elyata in the 15-episode serial The Lost City, which was produced by William Selig, Harry Warner, Jack L. Warner, and Sam Warner. The serial was edited to seven reels and re-released in the form of the feature-length film The Jungle Princess. However, during this time, Hansen's increasingly reckless lifestyle led to a cocaine addiction that quickly overwhelmed her life.

Hansen's performance in the Universal productions led to a 1920 deal with Pathé to star with Warner Oland and William Bailey in the 15-episode serial The Phantom Foe. She made a second Pathé serial, The Yellow Arm (1921). In 1928, Hansen retired from movies after she was scalded in a bathroom accident in the Hotel Lincoln in New York City. She was awarded $109,269 in damages and interest following a long legal battle.

== Personal problems ==
When she returned to work, behavioral problems caused by her drug addiction disrupted filming and ended her relationship with Pathé. She appeared in secondary roles in two more films, but by 1923 her film career was over at the age of 28.

In 1923, Hansen wrote a nationally syndicated "lengthy account of her journey through addiction". She attributed her recovery to treatment by Dr. John Baker at Oakland Sanitarium. She also spent a year on the Pantages vaudeville circuit speaking about the dangers of addiction to drugs.

Her life became a series of constant ups and downs fighting her addictions. Hansen and Anna Luther were named as two co-respondents in a divorce suit brought by Evelyn Nesbit against Jack Clifford. Clifford left Nesbit in 1918, and she divorced him in 1933.

She began working in live theatre, appearing as The Lady in Black in the Broadway production The High Hatters (1928). Ten years after her last film in 1923, she was given a secondary role in the Monogram Pictures B-movie Sensation Hunters (1933). This, her first talkie, was her last film, and the ensuing years were marked by continual struggles with her drug addiction. In 1934, Hansen tried a comeback in movies but it was unsuccessful.

At one point, she attempted suicide with an overdose of sleeping pills. She survived, and the experience helped turn her around. Although her acting career was long over, and her drug habit had left her penniless, she took a job as a clerk for a railroad company. She also worked in the Works Progress Administration during the Great Depression. In 1940, she was living in Chicago at the Lorraine Hotel.

== Later career and charitable work ==
Eventually, the former actress went public with her story. She created the Juanita Hansen Foundation to raise awareness of the dangers of drugs. She was jailed in 1937 on a narcotics charge but was cleared when she testified that tablets that police found in her purse were prescribed to her for medical purposes. She went on a lecture tour, crusading against traffic in illegal drugs.

In 1938 she wrote the book The Conspiracy of Silence, arguing that drug addicts should be sent to specialized medical institutions for treatment instead of being sent to prison.

Hansen died in 1961 at her home in West Hollywood, California, of heart failure. Her residence was 858 Hilldale Avenue. Her body was found by her maid, Pearl Edwards, who told deputy sheriffs the actress was suffering from a heart ailment. She was interred at Holy Cross Cemetery in Culver City, California. In the years before her death, she resided in a neighborhood only a few miles from where she once made motion pictures.

== Filmography ==
Year	Title	Role	Notes
1914	The Patchwork Girl of Oz	Bell Ringer	Uncredited
1914	The Magic Cloak of Oz		Short
1915	The Love Route	Lilly Belle	Lost film
1915	The Absentee	Genevieve Rhodes / Vanity	Lost film
1915	Betty in Search of a Thrill	June Hastings	Lost film
1915	The Secret of the Submarine	Cleo Burke	Lost film
1915	The Failure	Ruth Shipman	Lost film
1915	Martyrs of the Alamo	Old Soldier's Daughter	
1916	The Mediator	Maggie	Lost film
1917	Glory	Glory	Lost film
1917	Dangers of a Bride	The Country Girl	Short; Lost film
1917	A Clever Dummy	A Leading Lady	
1917	Whose Baby?		Short, Uncredited
1918	Broadway Love	Cherry Blow	
1918	Fast Company	Alicia Vanderveldt	Lost film
1918	The Risky Road	Lottie Bangor	
1918	The Mating of Marcella	Lois Underwood	Lost film
1918	The Brass Bullet	Rosalind Joy	Lost film
1918	The Rough Lover	Helen	Lost film
1918	The Sea Flower	Lurline	Lost film
1919	Breezy Jim	Patricia Wentworth	Lost film
1919	A Midnight Romance	Blondie Mazie	Incomplete film
1919	The Poppy Girl's Husband	Polly Dutton	
1919	Devil McCare	Mary Archer	Lost film
1919	Rough Riding Romance	The Princess	Lost film
1919	Lombardi, Ltd.	Phyllis Manning	
1920	The Lost City	Princess Elyata of Tarik	
1920	The Phantom Foe	Janet Dale	
1920	The Jungle Princess	Zoolah / Princess Elyata of Tarik	
1921	The Yellow Arm	Suzanne Valette	Lost film
1921	The Red Snow		Lost film
1922	The Eternal Flame		
1922	The Broadway Madonna	Gloria Thomas	Lost film
1923	Girl from the West		Lost film
1933	Sensation Hunters	Trixie Snell	(final film role)

== Bibliography ==
- Michael G. Ankerich (2010). Dangerous Curves atop Hollywood Heels: The Lives, Careers, and Misfortunes of 14 Hard-Luck Girls of the Silent Screen. BearManor. ISBN 978-1-59393-605-1.
