= Pirate Gold (1920 serial) =

1920 film

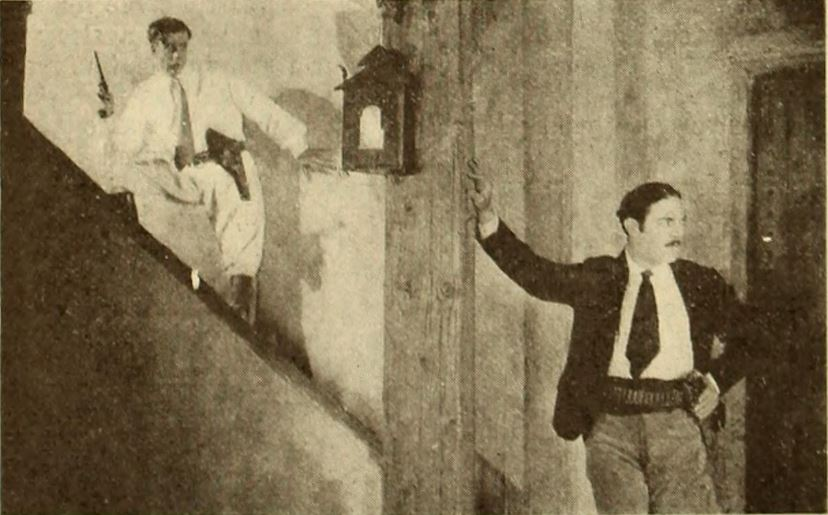
- Still from Rogues and Romance (1920), the feature version of the film serial
- Directed by: George B. Seitz
- Written by: Frank Leon Smith
- Starring: Marguerite Courtot; George B. Seitz
- Distributed by: Pathé Exchange; Astra Films
- Release date: August 15, 1920
- Running time: 10 episodes
- Country: United States
- Language: Silent with English intertitles

Pirate Gold is a 1920 American adventure film serial directed by George B. Seitz. Seitz also directed a feature-length version of the serial, Rogues and Romance, released in December 1920. The 10-episode serial was re-edited into the feature-length film Rogues and Romance (1920). The serial is now considered a lost film.

== Cast ==
- Marguerite Courtot as Gabrielle Hall
- George B. Seitz as Ivanhoe 'Hoey' Tuttle
- Frank Redman as Austin Tuttle
- William P. Burt as Tanner
- Joe Cuny as Kaidy
- Harry Stone as Constable Peabody
- Harry Semels as Siebert
- Matthew Betz as Harmon

== List of episodes ==
1. In Which Hoey Buys a Map
2. Dynamite
3. The Dead Man's Story
4. Treasure at Last
5. Drugged
6. Kidnapped
7. Under Suspicion
8. Knifed
9. The Double Cross
10. Defeat and Victory

== See also ==
- List of film serials
- List of film serials by studio
- List of lost films
