= Ernest Thayer =

American writer and poet (1863–1940)

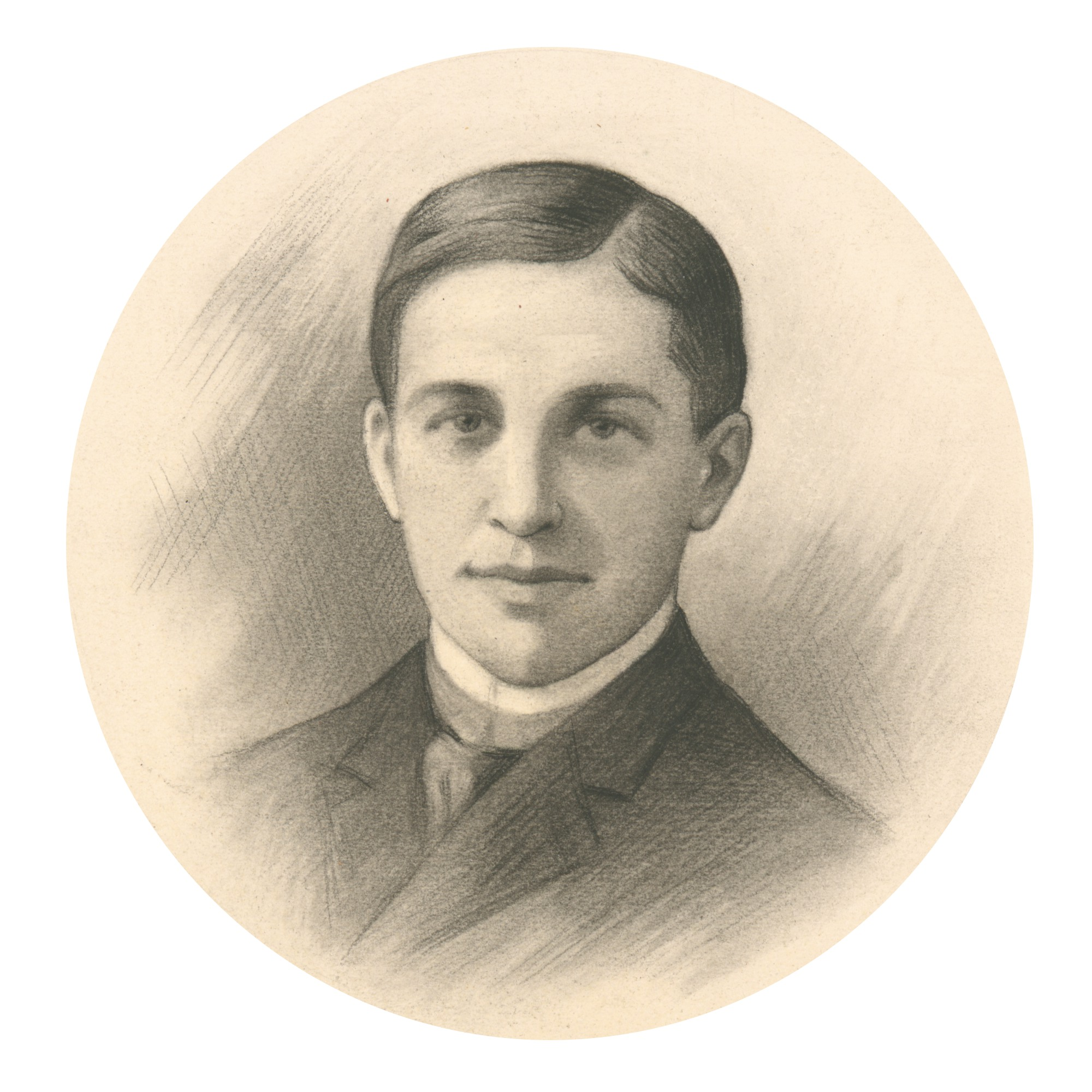
- Born: Ernest Lawrence Thayer; August 14, 1863; Lawrence, Massachusetts, US
- Died: August 21, 1940 (aged 77); Santa Barbara, California, US
- Education: Harvard University (BA)
- Occupation: Poet
- Spouse: Rosalind Buel Hammett
- Writing career
- Pen name: Phin

Ernest Lawrence Thayer (/ˈθeɪər/; August 14, 1863 – August 21, 1940) was an American writer and poet who wrote the poem "Casey" (or "Casey at the Bat"), which is "the single most famous baseball poem ever written" according to the Baseball Almanac, and "the nation’s best-known piece of comic verse—a ballad that began a native legend as colorful and permanent as that of Johnny Appleseed or Paul Bunyan".

== Biography ==
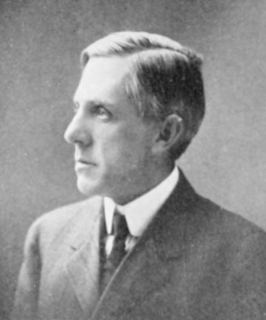
c. 1910

Thayer was born in Lawrence, Massachusetts, and raised in nearby Worcester. He graduated magna cum laude in philosophy from Harvard University in 1885, where he had been editor of the Harvard Lampoon and a member of the theatrical society Hasty Pudding. William Randolph Hearst, a friend from both activities, hired Thayer as humor columnist for the San Francisco Examiner 1886–88.

Thayer's last piece for the Examiner, dated June 3, 1888, was a ballad entitled "Casey" ("Casey at the Bat") which made him "a prize specimen of the one-poem poet" according to American Heritage.

During the mid-1890s, Thayer contributed several other comic poems for Hearst's newspaper the New York Journal and then began overseeing his family's mills in Worcester full-time. Thayer relocated to Santa Barbara in 1912, where he married Rosalind Buel Hammett and retired. He died in 1940, seven days after his 77th birthday.

== Casey at the Bat ==
During my brief connection with the Examiner, I put out large quantities of nonsense, both prose and verse, sounding the whole newspaper gamut from advertisements to editorials. In general quality "Casey" (at least in my judgment) is neither better nor worse than much of the other stuff. Its persistent vogue is simply unaccountable, and it would be hard to say, all things considered, if it has given me more pleasure than annoyance. The constant wrangling about the authorship, from which I have tried to keep aloof, has certainly filled me with disgust.

— Ernest Thayer

It was not until several months after the publication of "Casy at the Bat" on June 3, 1888 that Thayer became famous for it, since he was hardly the boastful type and had signed the June 24 poem with the nickname "Phin" which he had used since his time as a writer for the Harvard Lampoon. Two mysteries remain about the poem: whether Casey and Mudville were based on a real person or place, and, if so, their actual identities. On March 31, 2007, Katie Zezima of the New York Times wrote an article called "In 'Casey' Rhubarb, 2 Cities Cry 'Foul!'" on the competing claims of two towns to such renown: Stockton, California, and Holliston, Massachusetts. On the possible model for Casey, Thayer dismissed the notion that any single living baseball player was an influence. However, late 1880s Boston star Mike "King" Kelly is likely as a model for Casey's baseball situations. Besides being a native of a town close to Boston, Thayer, as a San Francisco Examiner baseball reporter in the off-season of 1887–88, covered exhibition games featuring Kelly. During November 1887, some of his reportage about a Kelly at-bat has the same ring as Casey's famous at-bat in the poem. A 2004 book by Howard W. Rosenberg, Cap Anson 2: The Theatrical and Kingly Mike Kelly: U.S. Team Sport's First Media Sensation and Baseball's Original Casey at the Bat, reprints a 1905 Thayer letter to a Baltimore scribe who was asking about the poem's roots. In the letter, Thayer named Kelly (d. 1894), as having shown "impudence" in claiming to have inspired it. Rosenberg argues that if Thayer still felt offended, Thayer may have later denied Kelly as an influence. Kelly had also performed as a vaudeville actor, and recited the poem dozens of times.

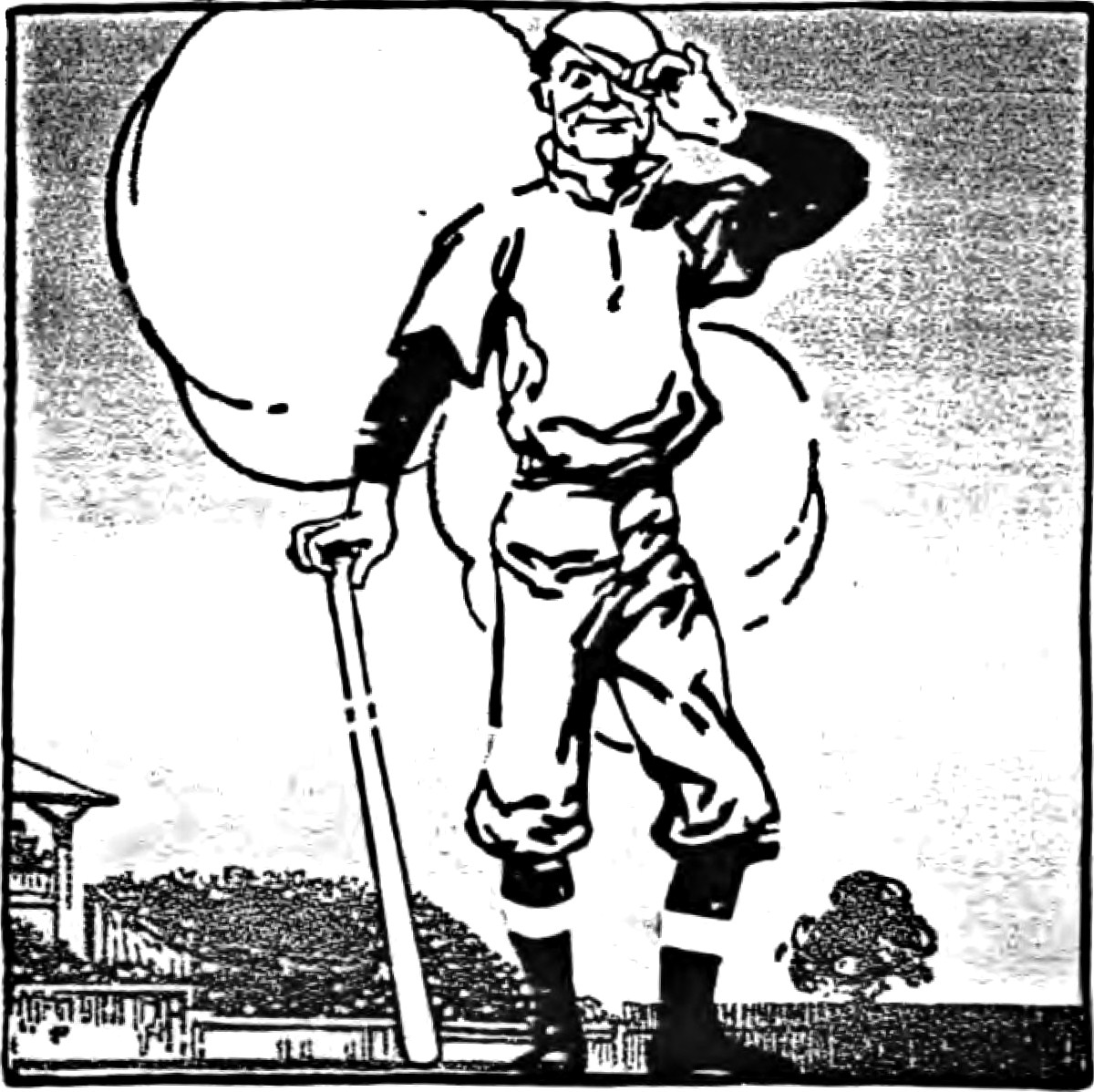
Illustration of "Casey at Bat"

The first public performance of the poem was on August 14, 1888, by actor De Wolf Hopper, on Thayer's 25th birthday. Thayer recited the poem at a Harvard class reunion in 1895.

The New York Times' obituary of Thayer on August 22, 1940, p. 19 quotes comedian DeWolf Hopper, who helped make the poem famous:

Thayer indubitably wrote "Casey," but he could not recite it.... I have heard many others give "Casey." Fond mamas have brought their sons to me to hear their childish voices lisp the poem, but Thayer's was the worst of all. In a sweet, dulcet Harvard whisper he implored "Casey" to murder the umpire, and gave this cry of mass animal rage all the emphasis of a caterpillar wearing rubbers crawling on a velvet carpet. He was rotten.
