= List of Academy Award–winning films =

This is a list of Academy Award–winning films.

If a film won the Academy Award for Best Picture, its entry is listed in a shaded background with a boldface title.

Competitive Oscars are separated from non-competitive Oscars (i.e. Honorary Award, Special Achievement Award, Juvenile Award); as such, any films that were awarded a non-competitive award will be shown in brackets next to the number of competitive wins.

Film	Year	Awards	Nominations
**One Battle After Another**	2025	6	13
Sinners	2025	4	16
Frankenstein	2025	3	9
KPop Demon Hunters	2025	2	2
Hamnet	2025	1	8
Weapons	2025	1	1
Sentimental Value	2025	1	9
Mr Nobody Against Putin	2025	1	1
All the Empty Rooms	2025	1	1
The Singers	2025	1	1
Two People Exchanging Saliva	2025	1	1
The Girl Who Cried Pearls	2025	1	1
F1	2025	1	4
Avatar: Fire and Ash	2025	1	2
**Anora**	2024	5	6
The Brutalist	2024	3	10
Emilia Pérez	2024	2	13
Wicked	2024	2	10
Dune: Part Two	2024	2	5
Conclave	2024	1	8
The Substance	2024	1	5
I'm Still Here	2024	1	3
Flow	2024	1	2
A Real Pain	2024	1	2
No Other Land	2024	1	1
I'm Not a Robot	2024	1	1
In the Shadow of the Cypress	2024	1	1
The Only Girl in the Orchestra	2024	1	1
**Oppenheimer**	2023	7	13
Poor Things	2023	4	11
The Zone of Interest	2023	2	5
American Fiction	2023	1	5
Anatomy of a Fall	2023	1	5
Barbie	2023	1	8
The Boy and the Heron	2023	1	1
Godzilla Minus One	2023	1	1
The Holdovers	2023	1	5
The Last Repair Shop	2023	1	1
20 Days in Mariupol	2023	1	1
War Is Over! Inspired by the Music of John and Yoko	2023	1	1
The Wonderful Story of Henry Sugar	2023	1	1
**Everything Everywhere All at Once**	2022	7	11
All Quiet on the Western Front	2022	4	9
The Whale	2022	2	3
Top Gun: Maverick	2022	1	6
Black Panther: Wakanda Forever	2022	1	5
Avatar: The Way of Water	2022	1	4
Women Talking	2022	1	2
Guillermo del Toro's Pinocchio	2022	1	1
Navalny	2022	1	1
The Elephant Whisperers	2022	1	1
An Irish Goodbye	2022	1	1
The Boy, the Mole, the Fox and the Horse	2022	1	1
RRR	2022	1	1
**CODA**	2021	3	3
Dune	2021	6	10
The Eyes of Tammy Faye	2021	2	2
No Time to Die	2021	1	3
The Windshield Wiper	2021	1	1
The Long Goodbye	2021	1	1
The Queen of Basketball	2021	1	1
Summer of Soul	2021	1	1
Drive My Car	2021	1	4
Encanto	2021	1	3
West Side Story	2021	1	7
Belfast	2021	1	7
The Power of the Dog	2021	1	12
King Richard	2021	1	6
Cruella	2021	1	2
**Nomadland**	2020/21	3	6
The Father	2020/21	2	6
Judas and the Black Messiah	2020/21	2	6
Minari	2020/21	1	6
Mank	2020/21	2	10
Sound of Metal	2020/21	2	6
Ma Rainey's Black Bottom	2020/21	2	5
Promising Young Woman	2020/21	1	5
Tenet	2020/21	1	2
Soul	2020/21	2	3
Another Round	2020/21	1	2
My Octopus Teacher	2020/21	1	1
Colette	2020/21	1	1
If Anything Happens I Love You	2020/21	1	1
Two Distant Strangers	2020/21	1	1
**Parasite**	2019	4	6
Ford v Ferrari	2019	2	4
Learning to Skateboard in a Warzone (If You're a Girl)	2019	1	1
The Neighbors' Window	2019	1	1
Little Women	2019	1	6
Marriage Story	2019	1	6
Jojo Rabbit	2019	1	6
Toy Story 4	2019	1	2
Joker	2019	2	11
Once Upon a Time in Hollywood	2019	2	10
1917	2019	3	10
Judy	2019	1	2
Bombshell	2019	1	3
Rocketman	2019	1	1
American Factory	2019	1	1
Hair Love	2019	1	1
**Green Book**	2018	3	5
Bohemian Rhapsody	2018	4	5
Roma	2018	3	10
Black Panther	2018	3	7
The Favourite	2018	1	10
A Star Is Born	2018	1	8
Vice	2018	1	8
BlacKkKlansman	2018	1	6
First Man	2018	1	4
If Beale Street Could Talk	2018	1	3
Bao	2018	1	1
Free Solo	2018	1	1
Period. End of Sentence.	2018	1	1
Skin	2018	1	1
Spider-Man: Into the Spider-Verse	2018	1	1
**The Shape of Water**	2017	4	13
Dunkirk	2017	3	8
Three Billboards Outside Ebbing, Missouri	2017	2	7
Darkest Hour	2017	2	6
Blade Runner 2049	2017	2	5
Coco	2017	2	2
Phantom Thread	2017	1	6
Call Me by Your Name	2017	1	4
Get Out	2017	1	4
I, Tonya	2017	1	3
Dear Basketball	2017	1	1
A Fantastic Woman	2017	1	1
Heaven Is a Traffic Jam on the 405	2017	1	1
Icarus	2017	1	1
The Silent Child	2017	1	1
Flesh and Sand (Carne y arena)	2017	0 (1)	0
**Moonlight**	2016	3	8
La La Land	2016	6	14
Hacksaw Ridge	2016	2	6
Manchester by the Sea	2016	2	6
Arrival	2016	1	8
Fences	2016	1	4
Fantastic Beasts and Where to Find Them	2016	1	2
The Jungle Book	2016	1	1
O.J.: Made in America	2016	1	1
Piper	2016	1	1
The Salesman	2016	1	1
Sing	2016	1	1
Suicide Squad	2016	1	1
The White Helmets	2016	1	1
Zootopia	2016	1	1
**Spotlight**	2015	2	6
Mad Max: Fury Road	2015	6	10
The Revenant	2015	3	12
Bridge of Spies	2015	1	6
The Big Short	2015	1	5
The Danish Girl	2015	1	4
Room	2015	1	4
The Hateful Eight	2015	1	3
Ex Machina	2015	1	2
Inside Out	2015	1	2
Amy	2015	1	1
Bear Story	2015	1	1
A Girl in the River: The Price of Forgiveness	2015	1	1
Son of Saul	2015	1	1
Spectre	2015	1	1
Stutterer	2015	1	1
**Birdman or (The Unexpected Virtue of Ignorance)**	2014	4	9
The Grand Budapest Hotel	2014	4	9
Whiplash	2014	3	5
The Imitation Game	2014	1	8
American Sniper	2014	1	6
Boyhood	2014	1	6
Interstellar	2014	1	5
The Theory of Everything	2014	1	5
Ida	2014	1	2
Selma	2014	1	2
Citizenfour	2014	1	1
Big Hero 6	2014	1	1
Crisis Hotline: Veterans Press 1	2014	1	1
The Phone Call	2014	1	1
Still Alice	2014	1	1
Feast	2014	1	1
**12 Years a Slave**	2013	3	9
Gravity	2013	7	10
Dallas Buyers Club	2013	3	6
Frozen	2013	2	2
The Great Gatsby	2013	2	2
Her	2013	1	5
Blue Jasmine	2013	1	3
Mr Hublot	2013	1	1
The Lady in Number 6	2013	1	1
Helium	2013	1	1
The Great Beauty	2013	1	1
20 Feet from Stardom	2013	1	1
**Argo**	2012	3	7
Life of Pi	2012	4	11
Les Misérables	2012	3	8
Lincoln	2012	2	12
Django Unchained	2012	2	5
Skyfall	2012	2	5
Silver Linings Playbook	2012	1	8
Zero Dark Thirty	2012	1	5
Amour	2012	1	5
Anna Karenina	2012	1	4
Paperman	2012	1	1
Brave	2012	1	1
Searching for Sugar Man	2012	1	1
Inocente	2012	1	1
Curfew	2012	1	1
**The Artist**	2011	5	10
Hugo	2011	5	11
The Iron Lady	2011	2	2
The Descendants	2011	1	5
The Girl with the Dragon Tattoo	2011	1	5
Midnight in Paris	2011	1	4
The Help	2011	1	4
A Separation	2011	1	2
The Fantastic Flying Books of Mr. Morris Lessmore	2011	1	1
The Shore	2011	1	1
Undefeated	2011	1	1
The Muppets	2011	1	1
Saving Face	2011	1	1
Beginners	2011	1	1
Rango	2011	1	1
**The King's Speech**	2010	4	12
Inception	2010	4	8
The Social Network	2010	3	8
The Fighter	2010	2	7
Toy Story 3	2010	2	5
Alice in Wonderland	2010	2	3
Black Swan	2010	1	5
In a Better World	2010	1	1
The Lost Thing	2010	1	1
God of Love	2010	1	1
The Wolfman	2010	1	1
Strangers No More	2010	1	1
Inside Job	2010	1	1
**The Hurt Locker**	2009	6	9
Avatar	2009	3	9
Precious	2009	2	6
Up	2009	2	5
Crazy Heart	2009	2	3
Inglourious Basterds	2009	1	8
Star Trek	2009	1	4
The Young Victoria	2009	1	3
The Blind Side	2009	1	2
Music by Prudence	2009	1	1
The Secret in Their Eyes	2009	1	1
The Cove	2009	1	1
The New Tenants	2009	1	1
Logorama	2009	1	1
**Slumdog Millionaire**	2008	8	10
The Curious Case of Benjamin Button	2008	3	13
Milk	2008	2	8
The Dark Knight	2008	2	8
WALL-E	2008	1	6
The Reader	2008	1	5
The Duchess	2008	1	2
Departures	2008	1	1
Vicky Cristina Barcelona	2008	1	1
Smile Pinki	2008	1	1
Man on Wire	2008	1	1
Toyland	2008	1	1
La Maison en Petits Cubes	2008	1	1
**No Country for Old Men**	2007	4	8
The Bourne Ultimatum	2007	3	3
There Will Be Blood	2007	2	8
La Vie en rose	2007	2	3
Atonement	2007	1	7
Michael Clayton	2007	1	7
Ratatouille	2007	1	5
Juno	2007	1	4
Sweeney Todd: The Demon Barber of Fleet Street	2007	1	3
The Golden Compass	2007	1	2
Elizabeth: The Golden Age	2007	1	2
Taxi to the Dark Side	2007	1	1
Peter & the Wolf	2007	1	1
Once	2007	1	1
Le Mozart des pickpockets	2007	1	1
The Counterfeiters (Die Fälscher)	2007	1	1
Freeheld	2007	1	1
**The Departed**	2006	4	5
Pan's Labyrinth (El laberinto del fauno)	2006	3	6
Dreamgirls	2006	2	8
Little Miss Sunshine	2006	2	4
An Inconvenient Truth	2006	2	2
Babel	2006	1	7
The Queen	2006	1	6
Letters from Iwo Jima	2006	1	4
Pirates of the Caribbean: Dead Man's Chest	2006	1	4
The Danish Poet	2006	1	1
Happy Feet	2006	1	1
The Last King of Scotland	2006	1	1
The Lives of Others (Das Leben der Anderen)	2006	1	1
Marie Antoinette	2006	1	1
West Bank Story	2006	1	1
The Blood of Yingzhou District	2006	1	1
**Crash**	2005	3	6
Brokeback Mountain	2005	3	8
Memoirs of a Geisha	2005	3	6
King Kong	2005	3	4
Capote	2005	1	5
Walk the Line	2005	1	5
The Constant Gardener	2005	1	4
The Chronicles of Narnia: The Lion, the Witch and the Wardrobe	2005	1	3
Hustle & Flow	2005	1	2
Syriana	2005	1	2
March of the Penguins (La Marche de l'empereur)	2005	1	1
Six Shooter	2005	1	1
The Moon and the Son: An Imagined Conversation	2005	1	1
A Note of Triumph: The Golden Age of Norman Corwin	2005	1	1
Tsotsi	2005	1	1
Wallace & Gromit: The Curse of the Were-Rabbit	2005	1	1
**Million Dollar Baby**	2004	4	7
The Aviator	2004	5	11
Ray	2004	2	6
The Incredibles	2004	2	4
Finding Neverland	2004	1	7
Sideways	2004	1	5
Lemony Snicket's A Series of Unfortunate Events	2004	1	4
Spider-Man 2	2004	1	3
Eternal Sunshine of the Spotless Mind	2004	1	2
The Motorcycle Diaries	2004	1	2
The Sea Inside	2004	1	2
Born into Brothels	2004	1	1
Mighty Times: The Children's March	2004	1	1
Wasp	2004	1	1
Ryan	2004	1	1
**The Lord of the Rings: The Return of the King**	2003	11	11
Master and Commander: The Far Side of the World	2003	2	10
Mystic River	2003	2	6
Cold Mountain	2003	1	7
Lost in Translation	2003	1	4
Finding Nemo	2003	1	4
The Barbarian Invasions	2003	1	2
Two Soldiers	2003	1	1
Monster	2003	1	1
Harvie Krumpet	2003	1	1
Chernobyl Heart	2003	1	1
The Fog of War	2003	1	1
**Chicago**	2002	6	13
The Pianist	2002	3	7
The Lord of the Rings: The Two Towers	2002	2	6
Frida	2002	2	6
The Hours	2002	1	9
Road to Perdition	2002	1	6
Adaptation	2002	1	4
Talk to Her (Hable con ella)	2002	1	2
This Charming Man (Der Er En Yndig Mand)	2002	1	1
Spirited Away	2002	1	1
Nowhere in Africa (Nirgendwo in Afrika)	2002	1	1
The ChubbChubbs!	2002	1	1
Twin Towers	2002	1	1
Bowling for Columbine	2002	1	1
8 Mile	2002	1	1
**A Beautiful Mind**	2001	4	8
The Lord of the Rings: The Fellowship of the Ring	2001	4	13
Moulin Rouge!	2001	2	8
Black Hawk Down	2001	2	4
Gosford Park	2001	1	7
Monsters, Inc.	2001	1	4
Pearl Harbor	2001	1	4
Iris	2001	1	3
Shrek	2001	1	2
Training Day	2001	1	2
Monster's Ball	2001	1	2
Thoth	2001	1	1
For the Birds	2001	1	1
No Man's Land	2001	1	1
Murder on a Sunday Morning (Un coupable idéal)	2001	1	1
The Accountant	2001	1	1
**Gladiator**	2000	5	12
Crouching Tiger, Hidden Dragon	2000	4	10
Traffic	2000	4	5
Erin Brockovich	2000	1	5
Almost Famous	2000	1	4
Wonder Boys	2000	1	3
How the Grinch Stole Christmas	2000	1	3
U-571	2000	1	2
Pollock	2000	1	2
Father and Daughter	2000	1	1
Into the Arms of Strangers: Stories of the Kindertransport	2000	1	1
Quiero ser (I want to be...)	2000	1	1
Big Mama	2000	1	1
**American Beauty**	1999	5	8
The Matrix	1999	4	4
The Cider House Rules	1999	2	7
Topsy-Turvy	1999	2	4
Sleepy Hollow	1999	1	3
Boys Don't Cry	1999	1	2
Tarzan	1999	1	1
One Day in September	1999	1	1
The Red Violin (Le violon rouge)	1999	1	1
The Old Man and the Sea	1999	1	1
My Mother Dreams the Satan's Disciples in New York	1999	1	1
King Gimp	1999	1	1
Girl, Interrupted	1999	1	1
All About My Mother (Todo sobre mi madre)	1999	1	1
**Shakespeare in Love**	1998	7	13
Saving Private Ryan	1998	5	11
Life Is Beautiful (La vita è bella)	1998	3	7
Elizabeth	1998	1	7
Gods and Monsters	1998	1	3
The Prince of Egypt	1998	1	2
Affliction	1998	1	2
What Dreams May Come	1998	1	2
The Personals	1998	1	1
The Last Days	1998	1	1
Election Night (Valgaften)	1998	1	1
Bunny	1998	1	1
**Titanic**	1997	11	14
Good Will Hunting	1997	2	9
L.A. Confidential	1997	2	9
As Good as It Gets	1997	2	7
The Full Monty	1997	1	4
Men in Black	1997	1	3
Visas and Virtue	1997	1	1
Character (Karakter)	1997	1	1
Geri's Game	1997	1	1
A Story of Healing	1997	1	1
The Long Way Home	1997	1	1
**The English Patient**	1996	9	12
Fargo	1996	2	7
Shine	1996	1	7
Evita	1996	1	5
Jerry Maguire	1996	1	5
Independence Day	1996	1	2
Emma	1996	1	2
Sling Blade	1996	1	2
The Ghost and the Darkness	1996	1	1
Kolya	1996	1	1
The Nutty Professor	1996	1	1
Quest	1996	1	1
When We Were Kings	1996	1	1
Breathing Lessons: The Life and Work of Mark O'Brien	1996	1	1
Dear Diary	1996	1	1
**Braveheart**	1995	5	10
Apollo 13	1995	2	9
Pocahontas	1995	2	2
The Usual Suspects	1995	2	2
Restoration	1995	2	2
Babe	1995	1	7
Sense and Sensibility	1995	1	7
Il Postino: The Postman	1995	1	5
Dead Man Walking	1995	1	4
Leaving Las Vegas	1995	1	4
Mighty Aphrodite	1995	1	2
Anne Frank Remembered	1995	1	1
A Close Shave	1995	1	1
Lieberman in Love	1995	1	1
One Survivor Remembers	1995	1	1
Antonia's Line (Antonia)	1995	1	1
Toy Story	1995	0 (1)	3
**Forrest Gump**	1994	6	13
The Lion King	1994	2	4
Speed	1994	2	3
Ed Wood	1994	2	2
Pulp Fiction	1994	1	7
Bullets Over Broadway	1994	1	7
The Madness of King George	1994	1	4
Legends of the Fall	1994	1	3
A Time for Justice	1994	1	1
Franz Kafka's It's a Wonderful Life	1994	1	1
Maya Lin: A Strong Clear Vision	1994	1	1
Burnt by the Sun (Utomlyonnye solntsem)	1994	1	1
Trevor	1994	1	1
The Adventures of Priscilla, Queen of the Desert	1994	1	1
Bob's Birthday	1994	1	1
Blue Sky	1994	1	1
**Schindler's List**	1993	7	12
The Piano	1993	3	8
Jurassic Park	1993	3	3
Philadelphia	1993	2	5
The Fugitive	1993	1	7
The Age of Innocence	1993	1	5
The Wrong Trousers	1993	1	1
Belle Epoque (The Beautiful Era)	1993	1	1
I Am a Promise: The Children of Stanton Elementary School	1993	1	1
Mrs. Doubtfire	1993	1	1
Black Rider (Schwarzfahrer)	1993	1	1
Defending Our Lives	1993	1	1
**Unforgiven**	1992	4	9
Howards End	1992	3	9
Bram Stoker's Dracula	1992	3	4
Aladdin	1992	2	5
The Crying Game	1992	1	6
Scent of a Woman	1992	1	4
A River Runs Through It	1992	1	3
Indochine	1992	1	2
My Cousin Vinny	1992	1	1
The Panama Deception	1992	1	1
Educating Peter	1992	1	1
The Last of the Mohicans	1992	1	1
Death Becomes Her	1992	1	1
Omnibus	1992	1	1
Mona Lisa Descending a Staircase	1992	1	1
**The Silence of the Lambs**	1991	5	7
Terminator 2: Judgment Day	1991	4	6
Bugsy	1991	2	10
JFK	1991	2	8
Beauty and the Beast	1991	2	6
Thelma & Louise	1991	1	6
The Fisher King	1991	1	5
In the Shadow of the Stars	1991	1	1
Manipulation	1991	1	1
Mediterraneo	1991	1	1
Session Man	1991	1	1
City Slickers	1991	1	1
Deadly Deception: General Electric, Nuclear Weapons and Our Environment	1991	1	1
**Dances with Wolves**	1990	7	12
Dick Tracy	1990	3	7
Ghost	1990	2	5
Goodfellas	1990	1	6
The Hunt for Red October	1990	1	3
Reversal of Fortune	1990	1	3
Cyrano de Bergerac	1990	1	5
American Dream	1990	1	1
Journey of Hope (Reise der Hoffnung)	1990	1	1
Days of Waiting	1990	1	1
Creature Comforts	1990	1	1
The Lunch Date	1990	1	1
Misery	1990	1	1
Total Recall	1990	0 (1)	2
**Driving Miss Daisy**	1989	4	9
Glory	1989	3	5
Born on the Fourth of July	1989	2	8
My Left Foot	1989	2	5
The Little Mermaid	1989	2	3
Dead Poets Society	1989	1	4
The Abyss	1989	1	4
Indiana Jones and the Last Crusade	1989	1	3
Henry V	1989	1	3
The Johnstown Flood	1989	1	1
Common Threads: Stories from the Quilt	1989	1	1
Cinema Paradiso	1989	1	1
Work Experience	1989	1	1
Batman	1989	1	1
Balance	1989	1	1
**Rain Man**	1988	4	8
Dangerous Liaisons	1988	3	7
Who Framed Roger Rabbit	1988	3 (1)	6
Mississippi Burning	1988	1	7
Working Girl	1988	1	6
The Accidental Tourist	1988	1	4
A Fish Called Wanda	1988	1	3
Pelle the Conqueror (Pelle erobreren)	1988	1	2
The Accused	1988	1	1
The Appointments of Dennis Jennings	1988	1	1
Beetlejuice	1988	1	1
Bird	1988	1	1
Hôtel Terminus: The Life and Times of Klaus Barbie	1988	1	1
The Milagro Beanfield War	1988	1	1
Tin Toy	1988	1	1
You Don't Have to Die	1988	1	1
**The Last Emperor**	1987	9	9
Moonstruck	1987	3	6
The Untouchables	1987	1	4
Babette's Feast (Babettes gæstebud)	1987	1	1
Dirty Dancing	1987	1	1
Harry and the Hendersons	1987	1	1
Innerspace	1987	1	1
The Man Who Planted Trees (L' Homme qui plantait des arbres)	1987	1	1
Ray's Male Heterosexual Dance Hall	1987	1	1
The Ten-Year Lunch	1987	1	1
Wall Street	1987	1	1
Young at Heart	1987	1	1
RoboCop	1987	0 (1)	2
**Platoon**	1986	4	8
A Room with a View	1986	3	8
Hannah and Her Sisters	1986	3	7
Aliens	1986	2	7
The Mission	1986	1	7
Children of a Lesser God	1986	1	5
The Color of Money	1986	1	4
Top Gun	1986	1	4
Round Midnight	1986	1	2
Artie Shaw: Time Is All You've Got	1986	1	1
The Assault (De Aanslag)	1986	1	1
Down and Out in America	1986	1	1
The Fly	1986	1	1
A Greek Tragedy	1986	1	1
Precious Images	1986	1	1
Women – for America, for the World	1986	1	1
**Out of Africa**	1985	7	11
Witness	1985	2	8
Cocoon	1985	2	2
Prizzi's Honor	1985	1	8
Back to the Future	1985	1	4
Kiss of the Spider Woman	1985	1	4
Ran	1985	1	4
The Official Story (La Historia Oficial)	1985	1	2
The Trip to Bountiful	1985	1	2
White Nights	1985	1	2
Anna & Bella	1985	1	1
Broken Rainbow	1985	1	1
Mask	1985	1	1
Molly's Pilgrim	1985	1	1
Witness to War: Dr. Charlie Clements	1985	1	1
**Amadeus**	1984	8	11
The Killing Fields	1984	3	7
A Passage to India	1984	2	11
Places in the Heart	1984	2	7
Indiana Jones and the Temple of Doom	1984	1	2
Charade	1984	1	1
Dangerous Moves (La Diagonale du fou)	1984	1	1
Purple Rain	1984	1	1
The Stone Carvers	1984	1	1
The Times of Harvey Milk	1984	1	1
Up	1984	1	1
The Woman in Red	1984	1	1
The River	1984	0 (1)	4
**Terms of Endearment**	1983	5	11
The Right Stuff	1983	4	8
Fanny & Alexander (Fanny och Alexander)	1983	4	6
Tender Mercies	1983	2	5
Yentl	1983	1	5
Flashdance	1983	1	4
Boys and Girls	1983	1	1
Flamenco at 5:15	1983	1	1
He Makes Me Feel Like Dancin'	1983	1	1
Sundae in New York	1983	1	1
The Year of Living Dangerously	1983	1	1
Return of the Jedi	1983	0 (1)	4
**Gandhi**	1982	8	11
E.T.: The Extra-Terrestrial	1982	4	9
An Officer and a Gentleman	1982	2	6
Tootsie	1982	1	10
Victor/Victoria	1982	1	7
Sophie's Choice	1982	1	5
Missing	1982	1	4
If You Love This Planet	1982	1	1
Just Another Missing Kid	1982	1	1
A Shocking Accident	1982	1	1
Tango	1982	1	1
To Begin Again (Volver a empezar)	1982	1	1
Quest for Fire	1982	1	1
**Chariots of Fire**	1981	4	7
Raiders of the Lost Ark	1981	4 (1)	8
Reds	1981	3	12
On Golden Pond	1981	3	10
Arthur	1981	2	4
An American Werewolf in London	1981	1	1
Close Harmony	1981	1	1
Crac	1981	1	1
Genocide	1981	1	1
Mephisto	1981	1	1
Violet	1981	1	1
**Ordinary People**	1980	4	6
Tess	1980	3	6
Raging Bull	1980	2	8
Fame	1980	2	6
Melvin and Howard	1980	2	3
Coal Miner's Daughter	1980	1	7
The Empire Strikes Back	1980	1 (1)	3
The Dollar Bottom	1980	1	1
The Fly (A Légy)	1980	1	1
From Mao to Mozart: Isaac Stern in China	1980	1	1
Karl Hess: Toward Liberty	1980	1	1
Moscow Does Not Believe in Tears	1980	1	1
**Kramer vs. Kramer**	1979	5	9
All That Jazz	1979	4	9
Apocalypse Now	1979	2	8
Norma Rae	1979	2	4
Breaking Away	1979	1	5
Alien	1979	1	2
Being There	1979	1	2
A Little Romance	1979	1	2
Best Boy	1979	1	1
Board and Care	1979	1	1
Every Child	1979	1	1
Paul Robeson: Tribute to an Artist	1979	1	1
The Tin Drum (Die Blechtrommel)	1979	1	1
The Black Stallion	1979	0 (1)	2
**The Deer Hunter**	1978	5	9
Coming Home	1978	3	8
Midnight Express	1978	2	6
Heaven Can Wait	1978	1	9
Days of Heaven	1978	1	4
California Suite	1978	1	3
The Buddy Holly Story	1978	1	3
Death on the Nile	1978	1	1
The Flight of the Gossamer Condor	1978	1	1
Get Out Your Handkerchiefs (Préparez vos mouchoirs)	1978	1	1
Scared Straight!	1978	1	1
Special Delivery	1978	1	1
Teenage Father	1978	1	1
Thank God It's Friday	1978	1	1
Superman	1978	0 (1)	3
**Annie Hall**	1977	4	5
Star Wars	1977	6 (1)	10
Julia	1977	3	11
Close Encounters of the Third Kind	1977	1 (1)	8
The Goodbye Girl	1977	1	5
A Little Night Music	1977	1	2
Gravity Is My Enemy	1977	1	1
I'll Find a Way	1977	1	1
Madame Rosa (La Vie devant soi)	1977	1	1
The Sand Castle (Le Château de sable)	1977	1	1
Who Are the DeBolts? And Where Did They Get Nineteen Kids?	1977	1	1
You Light Up My Life	1977	1	1
**Rocky**	1976	3	10
Network	1976	4	10
All the President's Men	1976	4	8
Bound for Glory	1976	2	6
A Star Is Born	1976	1	4
Fellini's Casanova (Il Casanova di Federico Fellini)	1976	1	2
The Omen	1976	1	2
Black and White in Color (Noirs et blancs en couleur)	1976	1	1
Harlan County, USA	1976	1	1
In the Region of Ice	1976	1	1
Leisure	1976	1	1
Number Our Days	1976	1	1
King Kong	1976	0 (1)	2
Logan's Run	1976	0 (1)	2
**One Flew Over the Cuckoo's Nest**	1975	5	9
Barry Lyndon	1975	4	7
Jaws	1975	3	4
Dog Day Afternoon	1975	1	6
Nashville	1975	1	5
Shampoo	1975	1	4
The Sunshine Boys	1975	1	4
Angel and Big Joe	1975	1	1
Dersu Uzala	1975	1	1
The End of the Game	1975	1	1
Great (Great (Isambard Kingdom Brunel))	1975	1	1
The Man Who Skied Down Everest	1975	1	1
The Hindenburg	1975	0 (2)	3
**The Godfather: Part II**	1974	6	11
The Towering Inferno	1974	3	8
The Great Gatsby	1974	2	2
Chinatown	1974	1	11
Murder on the Orient Express	1974	1	6
Earthquake	1974	1 (1)	4
Alice Doesn't Live Here Anymore	1974	1	3
Amarcord	1974	1	3
Harry and Tonto	1974	1	2
Closed Mondays	1974	1	1
Don't	1974	1	1
Hearts and Minds	1974	1	1
One-Eyed Men Are Kings (...borgnes sont rois, Les)	1974	1	1
**The Sting**	1973	7	10
The Exorcist	1973	2	10
The Way We Were	1973	2	6
Cries and Whispers (Viskningar och rop)	1973	1	5
A Touch of Class	1973	1	5
Day for Night (La Nuit américaine)	1973	1	4
Paper Moon	1973	1	4
The Paper Chase	1973	1	3
Save the Tiger	1973	1	3
The Bolero	1973	1	1
Frank Film	1973	1	1
The Great American Cowboy	1973	1	1
Princeton: A Search for Answers	1973	1	1
**The Godfather**	1972	3	10
Cabaret	1972	8	10
The Poseidon Adventure	1972	1 (1)	8
Travels with My Aunt	1972	1	4
Butterflies Are Free	1972	1	3
The Candidate	1972	1	2
The Discreet Charm of the Bourgeoisie (Le charme discret de la bourgeoisie)	1972	1	2
A Christmas Carol	1972	1	1
Limelight	1972	1	1
Marjoe	1972	1	1
Norman Rockwell's World... An American Dream	1972	1	1
This Tiny World	1972	1	1
**The French Connection**	1971	5	8
Fiddler on the Roof	1971	3	8
The Last Picture Show	1971	2	8
Nicholas and Alexandra	1971	2	6
Sentinels of Silence	1971	2	2
Bedknobs and Broomsticks	1971	1	5
Summer of '42	1971	1	4
The Garden of the Finzi-Continis (Il Giardino dei Finzi-Contini)	1971	1	2
The Hospital	1971	1	2
Klute	1971	1	2
Shaft	1971	1	2
The Crunch Bird	1971	1	1
The Hellstrom Chronicle	1971	1	1
**Patton**	1970	7	10
Ryan's Daughter	1970	2	4
Airport	1970	1	10
Love Story	1970	1	7
M*A*S*H	1970	1	5
Tora! Tora! Tora!	1970	1	5
Women in Love	1970	1	4
Lovers and Other Strangers	1970	1	3
Woodstock	1970	1	3
Cromwell	1970	1	2
Investigation of a Citizen Above Suspicion (Indagine su un cittadino al di sopra di ogni sospetto)	1970	1	2
Interviews with My Lai Veterans	1970	1	1
Is It Always Right to Be Right?	1970	1	1
Let It Be	1970	1	1
The Resurrection of Broncho Billy	1970	1	1
**Midnight Cowboy**	1969	3	7
Butch Cassidy and the Sundance Kid	1969	4	7
Hello, Dolly!	1969	3	7
Z	1969	2	5
Anne of the Thousand Days	1969	1	10
They Shoot Horses, Don't They?	1969	1	9
Marooned	1969	1	3
The Magic Machines	1969	1	2
The Prime of Miss Jean Brodie	1969	1	2
True Grit	1969	1	2
Arthur Rubinstein – The Love of Life (L'amour de la vie - Artur Rubinstein)	1969	1	1
Cactus Flower	1969	1	1
Czechoslovakia 1968	1969	1	1
It's Tough to Be a Bird	1969	1	1
**Oliver!**	1968	5 (1)	11
The Lion in Winter	1968	3	7
Romeo and Juliet	1968	2	4
Funny Girl	1968	1	8
2001: A Space Odyssey	1968	1	4
Bullitt	1968	1	2
The Producers	1967	1	2
Rosemary's Baby	1968	1	2
The Subject Was Roses	1968	1	2
The Thomas Crown Affair	1968	1	2
War and Peace (Voyna i mir)	1968	1	2
Charly	1968	1	1
Journey into Self	1968	1	1
Robert Kennedy Remembered	1968	1	1
Why Man Creates	1968	1	1
Winnie the Pooh and the Blustery Day	1968	1	1
Planet of the Apes	1968	0 (1)	2
**In the Heat of the Night**	1967	5	7
Camelot	1967	3	5
Bonnie and Clyde	1967	2	10
Guess Who's Coming to Dinner	1967	2	10
Doctor Dolittle	1967	2	9
The Graduate	1967	1	7
Thoroughly Modern Millie	1967	1	7
Cool Hand Luke	1967	1	4
The Dirty Dozen	1967	1	4
A Place to Stand	1967	1	2
The Anderson Platoon (La Section Anderson)	1967	1	1
The Box	1967	1	1
Closely Watched Trains (Ostre sledované vlaky)	1967	1	1
The Redwoods	1967	1	1
**A Man for All Seasons**	1966	6	8
Who's Afraid of Virginia Woolf?	1966	5	13
Grand Prix	1966	3	3
Fantastic Voyage	1966	2	5
A Man and a Woman	1966	2	4
Born Free	1966	2	2
The Fortune Cookie	1966	1	4
A Funny Thing Happened on the Way to the Forum	1966	1	1
A Herb Alpert and the Tijuana Brass Double Feature	1966	1	1
The War Game	1966	1	1
Wild Wings	1966	1	1
A Year Toward Tomorrow	1966	1	1
**The Sound of Music**	1965	5	10
Doctor Zhivago	1965	5	10
Darling	1965	3	5
Ship of Fools	1965	2	8
Cat Ballou	1965	1	5
The Great Race	1965	1	5
A Patch of Blue	1965	1	5
A Thousand Clowns	1965	1	4
The Shop on Main Street (Obchod na korze)	1965	1	2
The Sandpiper	1965	1	1
The Eleanor Roosevelt Story	1965	1	1
To Be Alive!	1965	1	1
7 Faces of Dr. Lao	1964	0 (1)	1
7th Heaven	1927/28	3	5
20,000 Leagues Under the Sea	1954	2	3
Adventures of Don Juan	1949	1	2
The Adventures of Robin Hood	1938	3	4
The African Queen	1951	1	4
Air Force	1943	1	4
The Alamo	1960	1	7
The Alaskan Eskimo	1953	1	1
Albert Schweitzer	1957	1	1
Alexander's Ragtime Band	1938	1	6
**All About Eve**	1950	6	14
**All Quiet on the Western Front**	1929/30	2	4
All That Money Can Buy	1941	1	2
**All the King's Men**	1949	3	7
Ama Girls	1958	1	1
America America	1963	1	4
**An American in Paris**	1951	6	8
Amphibious Fighters	1943	1	1
Anastasia	1956	1	2
Anchors Aweigh	1945	1	5
Anna and the King of Siam	1946	2	5
Annie Get Your Gun	1950	1	4
Anthony Adverse	1936	4	7
**The Apartment**	1960	5	10
Aquatic House Party	1949	1	1
Arise, My Love	1940	1	4
**Around the World in 80 Days**	1956	5	8
The Awful Truth	1937	1	6
The Bachelor and the Bobby-Soxer	1947	1	1
The Bad and the Beautiful	1952	5	6
Bad Girl	1931/32	2	3
The Barefoot Contessa	1954	1	2
The Battle of Midway	1942	1	1
Battleground	1949	2	6
Bear Country	1953	1	1
Becket	1964	1	12
The Bells of St. Mary's	1945	1	8
**Ben-Hur**	1959	11	12
Benjy	1951	1	1
The Bespoke Overcoat	1956	1	1
**The Best Years of Our Lives**	1946	7 (1)	8
Beyond the Line of Duty	1942	1	1
Bicycle Thieves	1949	0 (1)	1
The Big Broadcast of 1938	1938	1	1
The Big Country	1958	1	2
The Big House	1929/30	2	4
Bill and Coo	1948	0 (1)	0
Birds Anonymous	1957	1	1
The Bishop's Wife	1947	1	5
Black Fox: The Rise and Fall of Adolf Hitler (The Black Fox)	1962	1	1
Black Narcissus	1947	2	2
Black Orpheus (Orfeu Negro)	1959	1	1
The Black Swan	1942	1	3
Blithe Spirit	1946	1	1
Blood and Sand	1941	1	2
Blood on the Sun	1945	1	1
Blossoms in the Dust	1941	1	4
Body and Soul	1947	1	3
Bored of Education	1936	1	1
Born Yesterday	1950	1	5
A Boy and His Dog	1946	1	1
Boys Town	1938	2	5
The Brave One	1956	1	3
Breakfast at Tiffany's	1961	2	5
Breaking the Sound Barrier	1952	1	2
The Bridge of San Luis Rey	1928/29	1	1
**The Bridge on the River Kwai**	1957	7	8
The Bridges at Toko-Ri	1955	1	2
Broadway Melody of 1936	1935	1	3
**The Broadway Melody**	1928/29	1	3
Broken Lance	1954	1	2
Busy Little Bears	1939	1	1
BUtterfield 8	1960	1	2
Calamity Jane	1953	1	3
Call Me Madam	1953	1	2
Captain Carey, U.S.A.	1950	1	1
Captains Courageous	1937	1	4
**Casablanca**	1943	3	8
Casals Conducts: 1964	1964	1	1
The Cat Concerto	1946	1	1
**Cavalcade**	1932/33	3	4
Chagall	1963	1	1
The Champ	1931/32	2	4
Champion	1949	1	6
A Chance to Live	1949	1	1
The Charge of the Light Brigade	1936	1	3
The Chicken (Le Poulet)	1965	1	1
Churchill's Island	1941	1	1
**Cimarron**	1930/31	3	7
The Circus	1927/28	0 (1)	0
Citizen Kane	1941	1	9
City of Wax	1934	1	1
Cleopatra	1934	1	5
Cleopatra	1963	4	9
Climbing the Matterhorn	1947	1	1
Come and Get It	1936	1	2
Come Back, Little Sheba	1952	1	3
Coquette	1928/29	1	1
The Country Cousin	1936	1	1
The Country Girl	1954	2	7
Cover Girl	1944	1	5
The Cowboy and the Lady	1938	1	3
Crash Dive	1943	1	1
Crashing the Water Barrier	1956	1	1
The Critic	1963	1	1
La Cucaracha	1934	1	1
Cyrano de Bergerac	1950	1	1
A Damsel in Distress	1937	1	2
Dangerous	1935	1	1
The Dark Angel	1935	1	3
The Dawn Patrol	1930/31	1	1
Day of the Painter	1960	1	1
Daybreak in Udi	1949	1	1
Days of Wine and Roses	1962	1	5
December 7th	1943	1	1
Declaration of Independence	1938	1	1
The Defiant Ones	1958	2	9
Der Fuehrer's Face	1942	1	1
Desert Victory	1943	1	1
Design for Death	1947	1	1
Designing Woman	1957	1	1
Destination Moon	1950	1	2
The Diary of Anne Frank	1959	3	8
Disraeli	1929/30	1	3
The Divine Lady	1928/29	1	3
Divorce Italian Style	1962	1	3
The Divorcee	1929/30	1	4
Dodsworth	1936	1	7
The Dot and the Line (The Dot and the Line: A Romance in Lower Mathematics)	1965	1	1
A Double Life	1947	2	4
The Dove	1927/28	1	1
Dr. Jekyll and Mr. Hyde	1931/32	1	3
Dumbo	1941	1	2
Dylan Thomas	1962	1	1
East of Eden	1955	1	4
Easter Parade	1948	1	1
Elmer Gantry	1960	3	5
The Enemy Below	1957	1	1
Eskimo	1934	1	1
Exodus	1960	1	3
The Face of Lincoln	1955	1	2
Facing Your Danger	1946	1	1
The Facts of Life	1960	1	5
Fantasia	1940	0 (2)	0
A Farewell to Arms	1932/33	2	4
The Farmer's Daughter	1947	1	2
Father Goose	1964	1	3
Federico Fellini's 8½	1963	2	5
Ferdinand the Bull	1938	1	1
The Fighting Lady	1944	1	1
First Steps	1947	1	1
Flowers and Trees	1931/32	1	1
Folies Bergere	1935	1	1
For Scent-imental Reasons	1949	1	1
For Whom the Bell Tolls	1943	1	9
Forbidden Games	1952	0 (1)	1
A Force in Readiness	1961	0 (1)	0
A Free Soul	1930/31	1	3
Frenchman's Creek	1945	1	1
**From Here to Eternity**	1953	8	13
The Garden of Allah	1936	0 (1)	2
Gaslight	1944	2	7
Gate of Hell (Jigokumon)	1954	1 (1)	1
The Gay Divorcee	1934	1	5
**Gentleman's Agreement**	1947	3	8
Gerald McBoing-Boing	1950	1	1
Giant	1956	1	10
**Gigi**	1958	9	9
Giuseppina	1960	1	1
Give Me Liberty	1936	1	1
Glass (Glas)	1959	1	1
The Glenn Miller Story	1954	1	3
**Going My Way**	1944	7	10
Gold Diggers of 1935	1935	1	2
The Golden Fish (Histoire d'un poisson rouge)	1959	1	1
Goldfinger	1964	1	1
**Gone with the Wind**	1939	8 (2)	13
The Good Earth	1937	2	5
Goodbye, Miss Turlock	1947	1	1
Goodbye, Mr. Chips	1939	1	7
Grand Canyon	1958	1	1
**Grand Hotel**	1931/32	1	1
Grandad of Races	1950	1	1
The Grapes of Wrath	1940	2	7
The Great Caruso	1951	1	3
Great Expectations	1947	2	5
The Great Lie	1941	1	1
The Great McGinty	1940	1	1
The Great Waltz	1938	1	3
**The Great Ziegfeld**	1936	3	7
**The Greatest Show on Earth**	1952	2	5
Green Dolphin Street	1947	1	4
The Guns of Navarone	1961	1	7
**Hamlet**	1948	4	7
Happy Anniversary (Heureux Anniversaire)	1962	1	1
Harvey	1950	1	2
The Harvey Girls	1946	1	2
Heavenly Music	1943	1	1
The Heiress	1949	4	8
Helen Keller in Her Story (The Unconquered)	1955	1	1
Hello, Frisco, Hello	1943	1	2
Henry V	1946	0 (1)	4
Here Comes Mr. Jordan	1941	2	7
Here Comes the Groom	1951	1	2
The High and the Mighty	1954	1	6
High Noon	1952	4	7
Hitler Lives	1945	1	1
A Hole in the Head	1959	1	1
The Hole	1962	1	1
Holiday Inn	1942	1	3
The Horse with the Flying Tail	1960	1	1
The House I Live In	1945	0 (1)	0
The House on 92nd Street	1945	1	1
**How Green Was My Valley**	1941	5	10
How the West Was Won	1963	3	8
How to Sleep	1935	1	1
Hud	1963	3	7
The Human Comedy	1943	1	5
The Hurricane	1937	1	3
The Hustler	1961	2	9
I Want to Live!	1958	1	6
I Wanted Wings	1941	1	1
I Won't Play	1944	1	1
I'll Cry Tomorrow	1955	1	4
In Beaver Valley	1950	1	1
In Old Arizona	1928/29	1	5
In Old Chicago	1937	2	6
In Which We Serve	1942	0 (1)	2
The Informer	1935	4	6
Interrupted Melody	1955	1	3
The Invaders	1942	1	3
Irma la Douce	1963	1	3
**It Happened One Night**	1934	5	5
It's a Mad, Mad, Mad, Mad World	1963	1	6
The Jazz Singer	1927/28	0 (1)	1
Jezebel	1938	2	5
Joan of Arc	1948	2 (1)	7
Johann Mouse	1952	1	1
Johnny Belinda	1948	1	12
Johnny Eager	1942	1	1
The Joker Is Wild	1957	1	1
The Jolson Story	1946	2	6
Judgment at Nuremberg	1961	2	11
Julius Caesar	1953	1	5
Kentucky	1938	1	1
Key Largo	1948	1	1
The King and I	1956	5	9
King of Jazz	1929/30	1	1
King Solomon's Mines	1950	2	3
Kitty Foyle (Kitty Foyle: The Natural History of a Woman)	1940	1	5
Knighty Knight Bugs	1958	1	1
Kokoda Front Line!	1942	1	1
Kon-Tiki	1950	1	1
Krakatoa	1932/33	1	1
Kukan	1941	0 (1)	0
La Strada (The Road)	1956	1	2
La Dolce Vita	1961	1	4
Lady Be Good	1941	1	1
The Last Command	1927/28	1	2
Laura	1944	1	5
The Lavender Hill Mob	1952	1	2
**Lawrence of Arabia**	1962	7	10
Leave Her to Heaven	1945	1	4
Lend a Paw	1941	1	1
Les Girls	1957	1	3
A Letter to Three Wives	1949	2	3
**The Life of Emile Zola**	1937	3	10
Light in the Window	1952	1	1
Lili	1953	1	6
Lilies of the Field	1963	1	5
The Little Kidnappers (The Kidnappers)	1954	0 (2)	0
The Little Orphan	1948	1	1
Little Women	1932/33	1	3
Little Women	1949	1	2
The Lives of a Bengal Lancer	1935	1	7
The Living Desert	1953	1	1
The Longest Day	1962	2	5
Lost Horizon	1937	2	7
**The Lost Weekend**	1945	4	7
Love Is a Many-Splendored Thing	1955	3	8
Love Me or Leave Me	1955	1	6
Lust for Life	1956	1	4
Magoo's Puddle Jumper	1956	1	1
Main Street on the March!	1941	1	1
The Man Who Knew Too Much	1956	1	1
Manhattan Melodrama	1934	1	1
Marie-Louise	1945	1	1
**Marty**	1955	4	8
Mary Poppins	1964	5	13
Men Against the Arctic	1955	1	1
The Merry Widow	1934	1	1
A Midsummer Night's Dream	1935	2	4
Mighty Joe Young	1949	1	1
Mildred Pierce	1945	1	6
The Milky Way	1940	1	1
Min and Bill	1930/31	1	1
Miracle on 34th Street	1947	3	4
The Miracle Worker	1962	2	5
Mister Roberts	1955	1	3
Monsieur Vincent	1948	0 (1)	0
Moonbird	1959	1	1
The More the Merrier	1943	1	6
Morning Glory	1932/33	1	1
Moscow Strikes Back	1942	1	1
Mother Wore Tights	1947	1	3
Moulin Rouge	1952	2	7
Mouse Trouble	1944	1	1
Mr. Deeds Goes to Town	1936	1	5
Mr. Smith Goes to Washington	1939	1	11
**Mrs. Miniver**	1942	6	12
Munro	1960	1	1
The Music Box	1931/32	1	1
The Music Man	1962	1	6
**Mutiny on the Bounty**	1935	1	8
**My Fair Lady**	1964	8	12
My Uncle (Mon oncle)	1958	1	1
My Gal Sal	1942	1	2
The Naked City	1948	2	3
National Velvet	1945	2	5
Nature's Half Acre	1951	1	1
Naughty Marietta	1935	1	2
Neighbours	1952	1	2
Neptune's Daughter	1949	1	1
Never on Sunday (Pote tin Kyriaki)	1960	1	5
The Night of the Iguana	1964	1	4
Nights of Cabiria (Le Notti di Cabiria)	1957	1	1
Nine from Little Rock	1964	1	1
None But the Lonely Heart	1944	1	4
North West Mounted Police	1940	1	5
Now, Voyager	1942	1	3
An Occurrence at Owl Creek Bridge	1963	1	1
Of Pups and Puzzles	1941	1	1
Oklahoma!	1955	2	4
The Old Man and the Sea	1958	1	3
The Old Mill	1937	1	1
On the Town	1949	1	1
**On the Waterfront**	1954	8	12
One Hundred Men and a Girl	1937	1	5
One Night of Love	1934	2	6
One Way Passage	1932/33	1	1
Overture to The Merry Wives of Windsor	1953	1	1
The Paleface	1948	1	1
Panic in the Streets	1950	1	1
Papa's Delicate Condition	1963	1	1
The Patriot	1928/29	1	5
Penny Wisdom	1937	1	1
Phantom of the Opera	1943	2	4
The Philadelphia Story	1940	2	6
Picnic	1955	2	6
The Picture of Dorian Gray	1945	1	3
Pillow Talk	1959	1	5
The Pink Phink	1964	1	1
Pinocchio	1940	2	2
A Place in the Sun	1951	6	9
Plymouth Adventure	1952	1	1
Pollyanna	1960	0 (1)	0
Porgy and Bess	1959	1	4
Portrait of Jennie	1948	1	2
Prelude to War	1942	1	1
Pride and Prejudice	1940	1	1
The Pride of the Yankees	1942	1	11
Princess O'Rourke	1943	1	1
The Private Life of Henry VIII	1932/33	1	2
The Private Life of the Gannets	1937	1	1
Project Hope	1961	1	1
The Public Pays	1936	1	1
Pygmalion	1938	1	4
Quicker'n a Wink	1940	1	1
The Quiet Man	1952	2	7
Quiet Please!	1945	1	1
The Rains Came	1939	1	6
Rashomon	1951	0 (1)	1
The Razor's Edge	1946	1	4
Reap the Wild Wind	1942	1	3
**Rebecca**	1940	2	11
The Red Balloon (Le ballon rouge)	1956	1	1
The Red Shoes	1948	2	5
The Robe	1953	2	5
Robert Frost: A Lover's Quarrel with the World	1963	1	1
Roman Holiday	1953	3	10
Room at the Top	1959	2	6
The Rose Tattoo	1955	3	8
Sabrina	1954	1	6
Samson and Delilah	1950	2	5
Samurai I: Musashi Miyamoto (Miyamoto Musashi)	1955	0 (1)	0
San Francisco	1936	1	6
Sayonara	1957	4	10
The Scoundrel	1935	1	1
The Sea Around Us	1952	1	1
Seal Island	1948	1	1
The Search	1948	1 (1)	4
Seawards the Great Ships	1961	1	1
The Secret Land	1948	1	1
Seeds of Destiny	1946	1	1
Separate Tables	1958	2	7
Serengeti Shall Not Die (Serengeti darf nicht sterben)	1959	1	1
Sergeant York	1941	2	11
Seven Brides for Seven Brothers	1954	1	5
Seven Days to Noon	1951	1	1
The Seventh Veil	1946	1	1
Shane	1953	1	6
Shanghai Express	1931/32	1	3
She Wore a Yellow Ribbon	1949	1	1
Shoeshine (Sciuscià)	1947	0 (1)	1
The Silent World (Le Monde du silence)	1956	1	1
The Sin of Madelon Claudet	1931/32	1	1
Since You Went Away	1944	1	9
Skippy	1930/31	1	4
Sky Above and Mud Beneath (Le Ciel et la boue)	1961	1	1
The Snake Pit	1948	1	6
Snow White and the Seven Dwarfs	1937	0 (1)	1
So Much for So Little	1949	1	1
So This Is Harris!	1932/33	1	1
The Solid Gold Cadillac	1956	1	2
Some Like It Hot	1959	1	6
Somebody Up There Likes Me	1956	2	3
The Song of Bernadette	1943	4	12
Song of the South	1947	1 (1)	2
Song Without End	1960	1	1
Sons and Lovers	1960	1	7
Sons of Liberty	1939	1	1
South Pacific	1958	1	3
Spartacus	1960	4	6
Spawn of the North	1938	0 (1)	0
Speaking of Animals and Their Families	1942	1	1
Speedy Gonzales	1955	1	1
Spellbound	1945	1	6
Splendor in the Grass	1961	1	2
Stagecoach	1939	2	7
Stairway to Light	1945	1	1
Stalag 17	1953	1	3
Star in the Night	1945	1	1
A Star Is Born	1937	1 (1)	7
State Fair	1945	1	2
The Story of Louis Pasteur	1936	3	4
The Stratton Story	1949	1	1
Street Angel	1927/28	1	3
A Streetcar Named Desire	1951	4	12
Strike Up the Band	1940	1	3
The Substitute	1961	1	1
Sundays and Cybele (Le Dimanches de Ville d'Avray)	1962	1	3
Sunrise	1927/28	3	4
Sunset Boulevard	1950	3	11
Survival City	1955	1	1
Suspicion	1941	1	3
Sweet Bird of Youth	1962	1	3
Sweethearts	1938	0 (1)	2
Swing Time	1936	1	2
Symphony of a City	1948	1	1
Tabu	1930/31	1	1
Target for Tonight	1941	0 (1)	0
Teddy, the Rough Rider	1940	1	1
Tempest	1927/28	1	1
The Ten Commandments	1956	1	7
That Hamilton Woman	1941	1	4
That Mothers Might Live	1938	1	1
The Thief of Bagdad	1940	3	4
The Third Man	1950	1	3
Thirty Seconds Over Tokyo	1944	1	2
This Above All	1942	1	4
This Is the Army	1943	1	3
This Land Is Mine	1943	1	1
This Mechanical Age	1954	1	1
Three Coins in the Fountain	1954	2	3
The Three Faces of Eve	1957	1	1
Three Little Pigs	1932/33	1	1
Three Orphan Kittens	1935	1	1
Through a Glass Darkly (Såsom i en spegel)	1961	1	2
Thunderball	1965	1	1
Thursday's Children	1954	1	1
The Time Machine	1960	1	1
A Time Out of War	1954	1	1
Tin Pan Alley	1940	1	1
The Titan: Story of Michelangelo	1950	1	1
Titanic	1953	1	2
To Catch a Thief	1955	1	3
To Each His Own	1946	1	2
To Kill a Mockingbird	1962	3	8
**Tom Jones**	1963	4	10
tom thumb	1958	1	1
Toot, Whistle, Plunk and Boom	1953	1	1
Topkapi	1964	1	1
The Tortoise and the Hare	1934	1	1
Torture Money	1937	1	1
Toward Independence	1948	1	1
Transatlantic	1931/32	1	1
The Treasure of the Sierra Madre	1948	3	4
A Tree Grows in Brooklyn	1945	1	2
The True Glory	1945	1	1
The True Story of the Civil War	1956	1	1
Tweetie Pie	1947	1	1
Twelve O'Clock High	1949	2	4
Two Arabian Knights	1927/28	1	1
The Two Mouseketeers	1951	1	1
Two Women (La Ciociara)	1961	1	1
The Ugly Duckling	1939	1	1
Underworld	1927/28	1	1
The V.I.P.s	1963	1	1
Vacation from Marriage (UK title Perfect Strangers)	1946	1	1
Van Gogh	1949	1	1
The Vanishing Prairie	1954	1	1
The Virgin Spring (Jungfrukällan)	1960	1	2
Viva Villa!	1934	1	4
Viva Zapata!	1952	1	5
Waikiki Wedding	1937	1	2
The Walls of Malapaga	1950	0 (1)	0
The War of the Worlds	1953	1	3
Watch on the Rhine	1943	1	4
Water Birds	1952	1	1
The Way of All Flesh	1927/28	1	1
**West Side Story**	1961	10	11
The Westerner	1940	1	3
The Wetback Hound	1957	1	1
What Ever Happened to Baby Jane?	1962	1	5
When Tomorrow Comes	1939	1	1
When Magoo Flew	1954	1	1
When Worlds Collide	1951	1	2
White Shadows in the South Seas	1928/29	1	1
White Wilderness	1958	1	2
Who's Who in Animal Land	1944	1	1
Why Korea?	1950	1	1
Wilson	1944	5	10
**Wings**	1927/28	2	2
Wings Over Everest	1935	1	1
With a Song in My Heart	1952	1	5
With Byrd at the South Pole	1929/30	1	1
With the Marines at Tarawa	1944	1	1
The Wizard of Oz	1939	2	6
Woman of the Year	1942	1	2
Wonder Man	1945	1	4
The Wonderful World of the Brothers Grimm	1962	1	4
World of Kids	1951	1	1
World Without Sun (Le Monde sans soleil)	1964	1	1
Wrestling Swordfish	1931/32	1	1
Written on the Wind	1956	1	3
Wuthering Heights	1939	1	8
Yankee Doodle Dandy	1942	3	8
The Yankee Doodle Mouse	1943	1	1
The Yearling	1946	2	7
Yesterday, Today and Tomorrow (Ieri, oggi, domani)	1964	1	1
**You Can't Take It with You**	1938	2	7
Zorba the Greek (Alexis Zorbas)	1964	3	7

== Statistics ==
As of March 1, 2016

- Total number of films: 1,239
- Total number of Best Picture winners: 90
- Total number of awards ceremonies: 90
- Total number of awards associated with a film: 1,948 Competitive plus 46 Honorary
- Total number of nominations associated with a film: 4,403
- Total number of Oscar Statuettes awarded: 2,810 Competitive plus 49 Honorary = 2,859 in total

== Superlatives ==
- Films with the most awards: Ben-Hur (1959), Titanic (1997), and The Lord of the Rings: The Return of the King (2003) each earned 11 Academy Awards.
- Films with the most nominations: Sinners (2025) earned 16 Academy Award nominations.
- Film with the highest clean sweep: The Lord of the Rings: The Return of the King (2003) won all 11 Academy Awards from its 11 nominations.
- Films with the most nominations without a single win: The Turning Point (1977) and The Color Purple (1985) (11 nominations each)
- Film with the most awards without winning Best Picture: Cabaret (1972) won eight Academy Awards from its ten nominations. It lost Best Picture to The Godfather (1972).
