= Mooseheart, Illinois =

- Unincorporated community
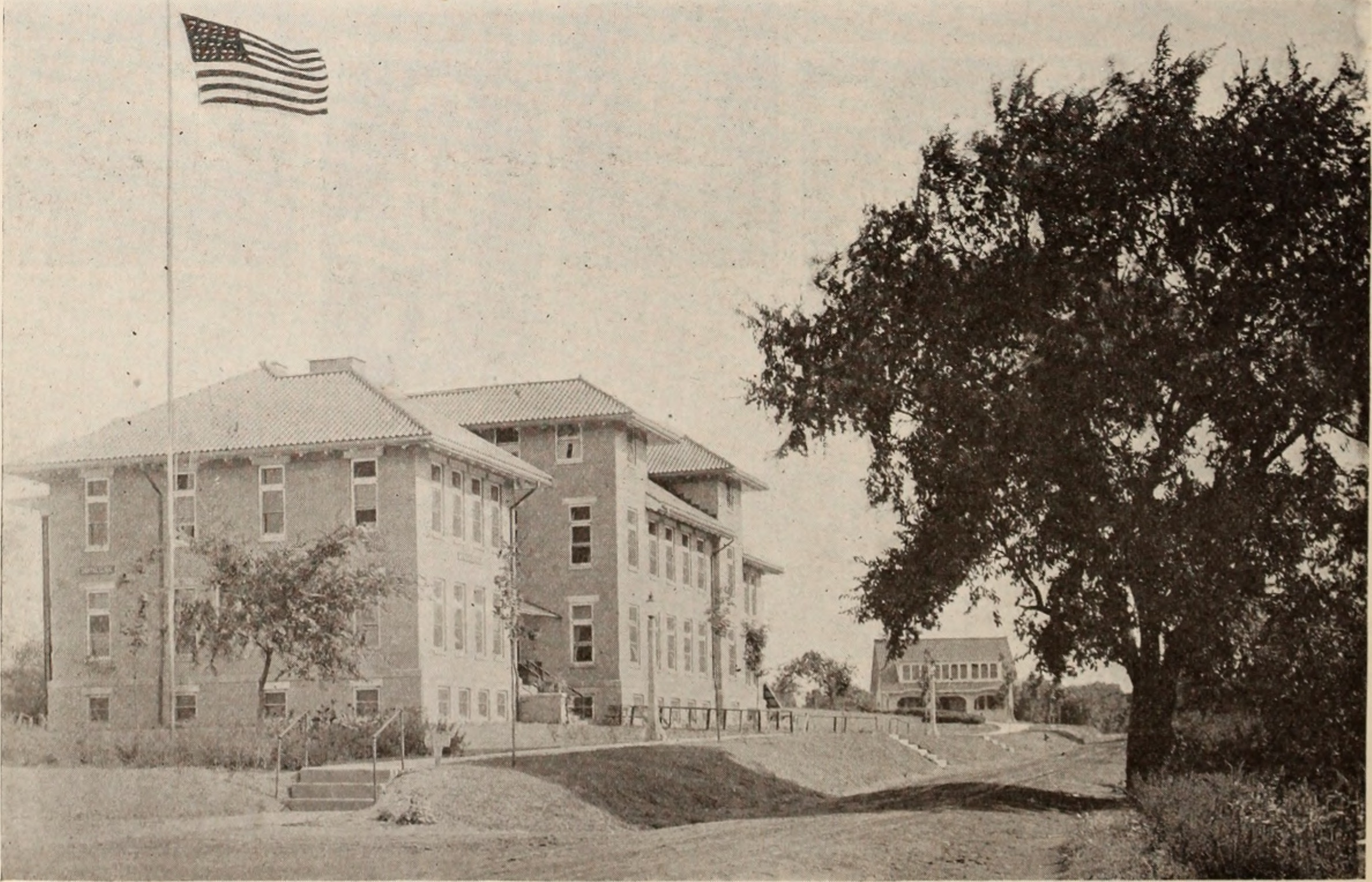
- Dormitory at Mooseheart in 1920

- Location of Mooseheart within Illinois Mooseheart (the United States)
- Coordinates: 41°49′06″N 88°19′53″W
- Country: United States
- State: Illinois
- County: Kane
- Township: Batavia
- Established: 1913
- Time zone: UTC-6 (CST)
  - Summer (DST): UTC-5 (CDT)
- ZIP code: 60539
- Area codes: 630/331

Mooseheart, located in Kane County, Illinois, is an unincorporated community and a home for children administered by the Loyal Order of Moose. Also known as The Child City, the community is featured as a 1949 episode of Metro-Goldwyn-Mayer's short film series Passing Parade, which was written and narrated by John Nesbitt. In 2013, Mooseheart celebrated its 100th anniversary with a rededication ceremony, public tours, fireworks, and other festivities.

Like Moose Lodges, Mooseheart was originally only open to Caucasians. The facility was created to be a home for the widows and the children of members of the Loyal Order of Moose. Later, any child who had a family member who was a member of the Moose could be admitted. In 1994, admission policies were changed to allow any child in need to apply for admission, regardless of the family's affiliation or lack thereof with the Moose.

In the 1950s, a pediatrician conducting a longitudinal study of children's growth at Mooseheart recalled there was tension since he felt that the board of directors was conducting the study to prove the superiority of the white race. By the 1990s, Mooseheart was open to children of all races and predominantly enrolled minority children.

In 1994, four Mooseheart employees were convicted of sexually abusing children. Two years later, a Mooseheart employee was convicted of possession of child pornography.

== See also ==
- Moose International
