= Dorothy Morris =

American actress (1922–2011)

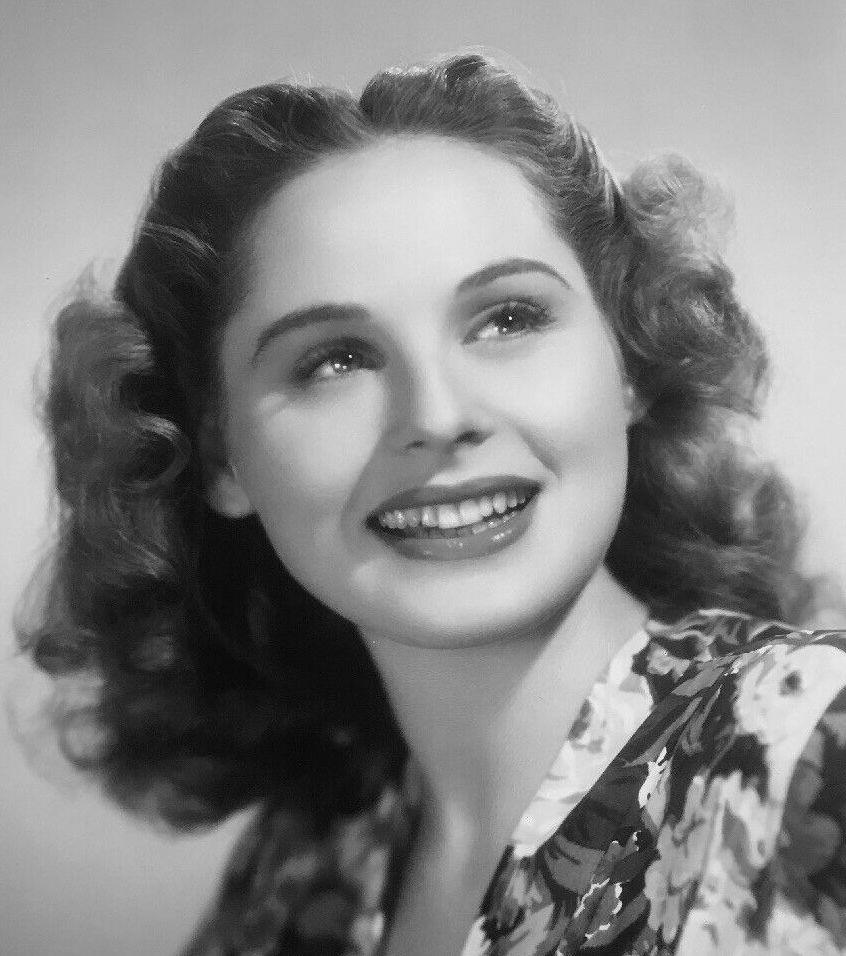
- Morris in 1946
- Born: Dorothy Ruth Morris; February 23, 1922; Los Angeles, California, U.S.
- Died: November 20, 2011 (aged 89); Palm Springs, California, U.S.
- Occupation: Actress
- Years active: 1940–1972
- Spouses: Marvin Moffie (m. 1943; div. 1966) Roger E. Miller (m. 1969; div. 1972)
- Children: 2
- Relatives: Caren Marsh Doll (sister); Bill Doll (brother-in-law)

Dorothy Ruth Morris (February 23, 1922 – November 20, 2011) was an American film and television actress known for her "girl next door" persona.

== Early life ==
Dorothy Ruth Morris was born and raised in Hollywood. She attended Hollywood High School and acted in productions at the Pasadena Playhouse. She was a student in Maria Ouspenskaya's School of Drama.

She was the younger sister of Caren Marsh Doll, who later became a dancer and stand-in for Judy Garland. She did a screen test for the female lead in The Courtship of Andy Hardy (1942), but lost to Donna Reed.

== Career ==
Appearing in bit parts in several of the studio's more successful films, Morris was signed to a Metro-Goldwyn-Mayer contract in 1941. For one of her early film roles, Cry 'Havoc' (1943), she affected a British accent. Her next picture was the well-received drama The Human Comedy, which featured a star cast, headed by Mickey Rooney, Frank Morgan, James Craig and Marsha Hunt. Morris' role was Mary Arena; the girlfriend of Van Johnson's character. The highlight of her career, however, came in 1945 when she starred as the doomed Ingeborg Jensen in Our Vines Have Tender Grapes. Other screen roles included Someone to Remember (1943), Pilot No. 5 (1943), Rationing (1944) and None Shall Escape (1944).

Morris is often remembered for her featured appearances in MGM short subjects. She appeared in several of the studio's short films including the Pete Smith Specialties, The Passing Parade, and Crime Does Not Pay series. The Crime short turned out so well that MGM expanded it into a full-length feature, Main Street After Dark in 1945, for which the actress was billed as Dorothy Ruth Morris. (Morris reminisces about her short-subjects experience in the Turner Classic Movies documentary Added Attractions: The Hollywood Shorts Story, first broadcast in 2002.)

== Later career ==
After she married in 1943, she took a hiatus from movie making. In the late 1950s, she made guest appearances on television series such as The Untouchables, The Donna Reed Show, Rawhide, Casey Jones, and Wagon Train. She made two film appearances during the 1950s in Macabre and The Power of the Resurrection (both 1958). Her last film role was in Seconds (1966) starring Rock Hudson. Her last television appearance was in a 1971 episode of Marcus Welby, M.D..

== Personal life and death ==
Morris was married to Marvin Moofie, a math teacher at Los Angeles Unified School District. They had two sons, Richard (born 1947) and Robert (born 1951).

Morris resided in Palm Springs, California until her death on November 20, 2011, at the age of 89. Upon her death, her body was donated to medical science at the University of California Riverside.

== Filmography ==
- Her First Beau – Shirley (uncredited) (1941)
- Whistling in the Dark – Telephone Operator (uncredited) (1941)
- Down in San Diego – Mildred Burnette (1941)
- Babes on Broadway – Chorus Girl (uncredited) (1941)
- Rio Rita – Gas Station Attendant (uncredited) (1942)
- This Time for Keeps – Edith Bryant (1942)
- Keeper of the Flame – Forward American Girl (uncredited) (1942)
- Seven Sweethearts – Peter van Maaster (1942)
- The Youngest Profession – Secretary (1943)
- The Human Comedy – Mary Arena (1943)
- Someone to Remember (1943)
- Cry 'Havoc' – Sue (1943)
- None Shall Escape (1944)
- Thirty Seconds Over Tokyo – Jane (credited as Dorothy Ruth Morris) (1944)
- Our Vines Have Tender Grapes – Ingeborg Jensen (1945)
- Main Street After Dark – Rosalie Dibson (1945)
- Club Havana – Lucy (1945)
- Little Miss Big – Kathy Bryan (1946)
- The Power of the Resurrection – Mary, sister of Lazarus (1958)
- Macabre – Alice Barrett (1958)
- Seconds -- Mrs. Filter (1966)
