= John Nesbitt's Passing Parade =

American radio series by John Nesbitt

The Passing Parade, also known as John Nesbitt's Passing Parade, was an American radio series created, written and narrated by John Nesbitt. It was adapted into an Oscar-winning series of MGM short subjects. In both formats, the series usually focused on strange-but-true historical events, both obscure and famous, as well as on historical figures such as Catherine de' Medici and Nostradamus.

== Passing Parade on radio ==
The radio series was developed as an offshoot of Headlines of the Past, an earlier program that John Nesbitt had produced. The show was launched on the NBC network on February 1, 1937, running intermittently until 1951 over three different networks and in syndication. Nesbitt's inspiration was a trunk inherited from his father that contained news clippings of odd stories from around the world. He utilized a research staff of 14 people to verify the details of his stories, but wrote the final scripts himself, often within an hour of airtime. The stories were usually presented without sound effects or music. The show was also heard as a segment on the John Charles Thomas radio program, upon which Nesbitt served as narrator, from 1943 to 1946.

Billboard wrote: "There was a time when no one could be sold the idea that one man, without much musical help, could fill a half hour and hold his audience. Nesbitt has disproved the bromide because he's Nesbitt and spins a yarn that's as tight as an Armistice announcement."

Radio producer/announcer John Doremus later acquired the rights to the series and revived it as a late 1950s-early 1960s syndicated feature, billing his version as "from the files of John Nesbitt." Only 130 episodes were syndicated in the US before it was canceled but the series was so popular in Australia that Grace Gibson Productions contracted Doremus to record additional episodes, scripted in Australia, where more than 1,500 three-minute episodes were broadcast. Many have since been published in MP3 format on CD (50 episodes per disc).

== Passing Parade on film ==
A series of Passing Parade one-reel short subjects were produced for MGM from 1938 to 1949. Most of the films feature the slow movement of Tchaikovsky's Symphony No. 5 as the opening theme music. The films' directors included Fred Zinnemann and Jacques Tourneur.

The films were reedited for television syndication by MGM in the early 1960s. The shorts in their original form were eventually re-aired on Turner Classic Movies. The films episodes may also be found as DVD extras accompanying some MGM films.

Year	Title	Subject matter	Cast	Home video availability
1938	Passing Parade		Margaret Bert	
1938	The Face Behind the Mask	The Man in the Iron Mask	Leonard Penn, directed by Jacques Tourneur	
1939	The Story of Alfred Nobel	Alfred Nobel	Paul Guilfoyle	
1939	Flag of Mercy	Clara Barton, founder of the American Red Cross	Sara Haden, Ann Rutherford	
1939	Yankee Doodle Goes to Town			
1939	The Story that Couldn't be Printed	John Peter Zenger	Victor Kilian	
1939	One Against the World		Jonathan Hale	
1940	The Hidden Master	Common luck	Peter Cushing, Emmett Vogan and Louis Jean Heydt	
1940	A Way in the Wilderness	Joseph Goldberger's research on pellagra	Shepperd Strudwick	
1940	Trifles of Importance		Clark Gable, Lana Turner, Robert Taylor, Myrna Loy, Mickey Rooney and Franklin D. Roosevelt	
1940	Utopia of Death			
1940	Dreams			
1940	American Spoken Here	American slang	John Harmon, Barbara Bedford and Ray Teal	
1941	Willie and the Mouse			
1941	This is the Bowery	Manhattan, the Bowery		
1941	Of Pups and Puzzles			
1941	Strange Testament		Edward Ashley and Ava Gardner	
1942	We Do It Because—		Ava Gardner, Dorothy Morris and Mark Daniels	Reunion in France (DVD)
1942	The Woman in the House		Ann Richards	
1942	The Incredible Stranger		Paul Guilfoyle, Dorothy Vaughan and Walter Baldwin	
1942	The Magic Alphabet	Christiaan Eijkman's discovery of vitamins	Horace McNally	Great Day in the Morning (DVD)
1942	Famous Boners	Three people who caused or were victims of errors	Edward McWade, Ian Wolfe, Dave O'Brien, Joe Yule, and Margaret Bert	
1942	The Film that Was Lost	Film preservation		
1943	Madero of Mexico	Francisco I. Madero	Paul Guilfoyle and John Picorri	
1943	Who's Superstitious?	Common superstitions	Don Taylor, Ernie Alexander, Fred Toones and Margaret Bert	
1943	That's Why I Left You		Jacqueline White and James Warren	
1943	Forgotten Treasure	Film preservation		
1943	Storm			
1943	To My Unborn Son		Steven Geray	
1944	Return from Nowhere		Don DeFore	
1944	Grandpa Called it Art		Contemporary artists Thomas Hart Benton, John French Sloan, Ivan Le Lorraine Albright, Reginald Marsh	
1944	A Lady Fights Back	SS Normandie		Thirty Seconds Over Tokyo (DVD)
1945	The Seesaw and the Shoes	Rene Laennec's invention of the stethoscope; Charles Goodyear's invention of vulcanized rubber		
1945	The Great American Mug	History of the barber shop		Thrill of a Romance (DVD)
1945	Stairway to Light	Philippe Pinel	Wolfgang Zilzer and Gene Roth; won an Oscar for Best One-Reel Short Subject	The Picture of Dorian Gray (DVD)
1945	People on Paper	Comic strips	Harold Knerr (The Katzenjammer Kids), Bud Fisher (Mutt and Jeff), Fred Lasswell (Barney Google and Snuffy Smith), Frank King (Gasoline Alley), Chester Gould (Dick Tracy), Dick Calkins (Buck Rogers in the 25th Century), Milton Caniff (Terry and the Pirates), Chic Young (Blondie and Dagwood), Raeburn Van Buren (Abbie an' Slats), Ham Fisher (Joe Palooka), Hal Foster (Prince Valiant), Harold Gray (Little Orphan Annie) and Al Capp (Li'l Abner)	
1946	Golden Hunch			
1946	Magic on a Stick	John Walker's invention of the friction match	Paul Langton and Jacqueline White	
1946	Our Old Car		Jacqueline White	
1947	A Really Important Person		Dean Stockwell, Connie Gilchrist, Clancy Cooper and Chick York	Song of the Thin Man (DVD)
1947	Tennis in Rhythm			
1948	Goodbye, Miss Turlock		Nana Bryant; won an Oscar for Best One-Reel Short Subject	Fiesta (DVD)
1948	My Old Town			
1948	Souvenirs of Death	The voice of the Mauser pistol		Command Decision (DVD)
1948	The Fabulous Fraud	Anton Mesmer and hypnotism	John Baragrey, Phyllis Morris, Marcia Mae Jones and Morris Ankrum	
1949	Annie Was a Wonder		Kathleen Freeman, Howard J. Negley, Ruth Lee and Hugo-Sven Borg	The Barkleys of Broadway (DVD)
1949	Mr. Whitney Had a Notion	Eli Whitney and interchangeable parts	Lloyd Bridges	On the Town (Blu-ray)
1949	City of Children	Mooseheart, Illinois		
