= Herbert Moulton =

American film producer

- Occupations: Film producer, film director
- Years active: 1934–1965

Herbert Moulton was an American film producer and director. He won two Academy Awards, both for Best Short Subject. The first award was in 1946 for Stairway to Light and the second in 1948 for Goodbye, Miss Turlock.

Moulton also worked as a film editor and critic for the Los Angeles Times.

== Selected filmography ==
- Goodbye, Miss Turlock (1948)
- Stairway to Light (1945)
