= John Doremus =

American radio personality (1931–1995)

John Doremus (August 3, 1931 in Sapulpa, Oklahoma – July 6, 1995 in Naperville, Illinois) was an American radio personality, best known for his radio syndication of The Passing Parade, a series of short stories of remarkable but relatively unknown episodes throughout history.

In the late 1950s he acquired the rights to the series, which until then had been a television series, and syndicated it for radio. The stories chronicled diverse topics, ranging from the first white man to discover the mountain gorilla to the espionage and intrigue during wartime.

During the mid 1960s Doremus produced Patterns in Music for WMAQ in Chicago. Original recordings of Patterns in Music were being aired by KNXR (FM 97.5 MHz), in Rochester, Minnesota until January 31, 2015, when the station was sold and the station's format was changed. The series is now heard on 97Five, an internet re-birth of those first 50 years of KNXR.

In 1964, his company pioneered the idea of in-flight music for airlines. Doremus originated the idea of providing in-flight programming for American Airlines and a host of other airlines, including most notably, Air Force One, starting under President Richard Nixon, and later Ronald Reagan. Around the same time, Grace Gibson Productions acquired Australian and New Zealand rights to his Passing Parade series.

In 1956 and 1957 he was an announcer for Oklahoma Sooners football. He provided the voice-over for the NFL Films highlight package of Super Bowl XXI, the announcer on the 1979 Gorgar Speaks promotional record, and the digitally recorded voice of the titular villain in the 1982 video game Sinistar (excluding the roar).

A few months after the death in 1971 of Franklin MacCormack, host of the all-night Meisterbrau Showcase on WGN radio, John Doremus took over the overnight show. The new sponsor of the show was Talman Federal Savings and Loan.

His company, John Doremus, Inc. had an office suite on the 18th floor of the John Hancock Center in Chicago.
