= Main Street After Dark =

1945 film by Edward L. Cahn

- Theatrical release poster
- Directed by: Edward L. Cahn
- Screenplay by: John C. Higgins; Karl Kamb
- Story by: John C. Higgins
- Produced by: Jerry Bresler
- Starring: Edward Arnold; Selena Royle; Tom Trout; Audrey Totter; Dan Duryea; Hume Cronyn; Dorothy Morris
- Cinematography: Jackson Rose
- Edited by: Harry Komer
- Music by: George Bassman
- Production company: Metro-Goldwyn-Mayer
- Distributed by: Metro-Goldwyn-Mayer
- Release date: January 12, 1945
- Running time: 57 minutes
- Country: United States
- Language: English

Main Street After Dark is a 1945 American drama film directed by Edward L. Cahn and written by John C. Higgins and Karl Kamb. The film stars Edward Arnold, Selena Royle, Tom Trout, Audrey Totter, Dan Duryea, Hume Cronyn and Dorothy Morris. The film was released on January 12, 1945, by Metro-Goldwyn-Mayer.

== Plot ==
Lt. Lorrigan has his hands full with the Dibson criminal family. Ma Dibson's thieving son Lefty is about to get out of prison. Her daughter Rosalie and Lefty's wife Jessie Belle pick up military servicemen in bars and steal from them.

Lorrigan keeps an eye on all. He frisks Lefty's brother Posey, warning the Dibsons to keep out of trouble. Lefty immediately plans to rob McBain, owner of the bar where Rosalie and Jessie Belle fleece the servicemen.

Using guns from pawnbroker Keller, expressly against Ma's wishes, Lefty falls into Lt. Lorrigan's trap, with undercover cops disguised as soldiers. In the struggle, Posey is accidentally shot. Lefty, Ma and the girls are all placed under arrest.

== Cast ==
- Edward Arnold as Lt. Lorrigan
- Selena Royle as 'Ma' Abby Dibson
- Tom Trout as Lefty Dibson
- Audrey Totter as Jessie Belle Dibson
- Dan Duryea as Posey Dibson
- Hume Cronyn as Keller
- Dorothy Morris as Rosalie Dibson
