= Little Miss Big =

1946 film directed by Erle C. Kenton

- Theatrical release poster
- Directed by: Erle C. Kenton
- Screenplay by: Erna Lazarus
- Story by: Harry Poppe; Chester Beecroft; Mary Marlind
- Produced by: Stanley Rubin
- Starring: Beverly Simmons; Frederick Brady; Fay Holden; Frank McHugh; Dorothy Morris; Milburn Stone
- Cinematography: Paul Ivano
- Edited by: Russell F. Schoengarth
- Production company: Universal Pictures
- Distributed by: Universal Pictures
- Release date: August 30, 1946
- Running time: 60 minutes
- Country: United States
- Language: English

Little Miss Big is a 1946 American comedy film directed by Erle C. Kenton and written by Erna Lazarus. The film stars Beverly Simmons, Frederick Brady, Fay Holden, Frank McHugh, Dorothy Morris and Milburn Stone. The film was released on August 30, 1946, by Universal Pictures.

== Cast ==
- Beverly Simmons as Nancy Bryan
- Frederick Brady as Eddie Martin
- Fay Holden as Mary Jane Baxter
- Frank McHugh as Charlie Bryan
- Dorothy Morris as Kathy Bryan
- Milburn Stone as Father Lennergan
- Samuel S. Hinds as Wilfred Elliott
- John Eldredge as Sanford Baxter
- Houseley Stevenson as Duncan
- Jeff York as Clancy
- Peggy Webber as Ellen
- Arthur Loft as Mayor
- Edit Angold as Nurse
