= Harry Shannon (actor) =

American actor (1890–1964)

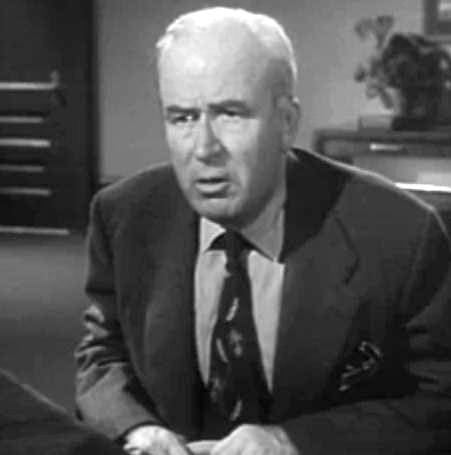
- Shannon in The Jackie Robinson Story (1950)
- Born: June 13, 1890; Saginaw, Michigan, U.S.
- Died: July 27, 1964 (aged 74); Hollywood, California, U.S.
- Occupation: Actor
- Years active: 1930–1963

Harry Shannon (June 13, 1890 – July 27, 1964) was an American character actor. He often appeared in Western films.

== Early years ==
Shannon was born on a farm in Saginaw, Michigan. His portrayal of Irishmen led many people to ask him from what part of Ireland he came. He told a reporter in 1939, "I never have the heart to tell them I have been no nearer Ireland than Saginaw's first ward, so I always say, 'My father came from Enniskillen and my mother came from Cork.' So they did, but I never have laid eyes on the place." He had a brother and four sisters. His father worked for the Saginaw Traction Company in jobs that included driving a horse car in that city.

In his youth Shannon helped to support his family by working at jobs that included selling newspapers, delivering groceries, ushering at a theater, and working as a bellhop. When he was a student at Saginaw High School, he auditioned as part of an act that was signed by Walter S. Butterfield for his theatrical circuit. That signing enabled Shannon to achieve his aspiration to become an actor.

== Career ==
Shannon toured with productions for several years, made a brief return to Saginaw to act in stock theater at the Bijou there, and then went to Chicago to enter vaudeville as a single act. During his time there he was erroneously reported dead after a boat sank in the Chicago River with a Harry Shannon among the passengers who died. The actor's family was unable to reach him by phone and thought he was the victim. By the time they learned that he was alive, the Saginaw newspapers had printed his obituary.

After beginning his career in live theater and vaudeville, be switched to the film industry in the 1930s.

His Broadway credits included Mrs. O'Brien Entertains (1939), Washington Jitters (1938), Under Glass (1933), Pardon My English (1933), Free For All (1931), Simple Simon (1931), Jonica (1930), Hold Everything (1928), and Oh, Kay! (1926).

Although he appeared most frequently in Westerns in the last decade of his career, his best-known film role was perhaps as Charles Foster Kane's rough father in Citizen Kane (1941). Among his other films were Someone to Remember (1943), Alaska Highway (1943), San Quentin (1946), Mr. Blandings Builds His Dream House (1948) and Witness to Murder (1954).

In 1956 he appeared as Matt Crowley in the "Johnny Bravo" episode of the TV Western Cheyenne. In 1960, he was cast as outlaw Clay Hooper in the "Showdown at Goldtown" episode of the ABC/Warner Brothers Western television series, Colt .45. He appeared as the villain cowboy Dad "Jobe Craig" in S3E27's "Meeting at Mimbres" in the 1961 Western Bat Masterson. He appeared in several other TV Westerns in the late 1950s and early 1960s: The Sheriff of Cochise, Have Gun - Will Travel, Tales of Wells Fargo, The Texan and Laramie.

== Death ==
Shannon died in Hollywood on July 27, 1964, at age 74.

== Selected filmography ==
- Heads Up (1930) – Captain Denny
- Take a Chance (1933) – Bartender
- The Middleton Family at the New York World's Fair (1939) – Father
- City of Chance (1940) – Passline
- Parole Fixer (1940) – Randall
- Young Tom Edison (1940) – Army Captain Brackett
- Young as You Feel (1940) – Gillespie
- Tear Gas Squad (1940) – Lieutenant Sullivan
- Gambling on the High Seas (1940) – Chief of Police
- Sailor's Lady (1940) – Father McGann
- One Crowded Night (1940) – McDermott
- Girl from Avenue A (1940) – Timson
- Too Many Girls (1940) – Mr. Casey
- Tugboat Annie Sails Again (1940) – Captain Mahoney
- The Saint in Palm Springs (1941) – Chief R.L. Graves
- Citizen Kane (1941) – Jim Kane, Kane's Father
- Hold Back the Dawn (1941) – American Immigration Official (uncredited)
- The Lady Is Willing (1942) – Detective Sergeant Barnes
- The Affairs of Jimmy Valentine (1942) – Pinky
- This Gun for Hire (1942) – Steve Finnerty
- The Mad Martindales (1942) – Policeman
- The Falcon Takes Over (1942) – Detective Grimes (uncredited)
- In Old California (1942) – Mr. Carlin
- The Big Street (1942) – Florida Doctor (uncredited)
- Mrs. Wiggs of the Cabbage Patch (1942) – Mr. Wiggs (uncredited)
- Once Upon a Honeymoon (1942) – Ed Cumberland
- Random Harvest (1942) – Badgeley – Melbridge Works (uncredited)
- The Powers Girl (1943) – Mr. Hendricks
- Idaho (1943) – Judge John Grey – aka Tom Allison
- Song of Texas (1943) – Sam Bennett
- Alaska Highway (1943) – John 'Pop' Ormsby
- Someone to Remember (1943) – Tom Gibbons
- Headin' for God's Country (1943) – Albert Ness
- Doughboys in Ireland (1943) – Michael Callahan
- Government Girl (1943) – Mr. Gibon (uncredited)
- The Heat's On (1943) – Police Captain (uncredited)
- In Old Oklahoma (1943) – Charlie Witherspoon (uncredited)
- True to Life (1943) – Mr. Mason
- The Fighting Sullivans (1944) – Chief Petty Officer (uncredited)
- The Eve of St. Mark (1944) – Chaplain (uncredited)
- Ladies of Washington (1944) – Police Lieutenant Lake (uncredited)
- The Yellow Rose of Texas (1944) – Sam Weston
- The Mummy's Ghost (1944) – Sheriff
- Babes on Swing Street (1944) – Lieutenant Casey (uncredited)
- Barbary Coast Gent (1944) – San Francisco Police Chief (uncredited)
- When the Lights Go On Again (1944) – Tom Cary
- Crime, Inc. (1945) – Commissioner Collins
- Nob Hill (1945) – Policeman in China Town (uncredited)
- Captain Eddie (1945) – Simmons
- Within These Walls (1945) – Head Guard 'Mac' McCafferty
- Incendiary Blonde (1945) – George – Police Detective (uncredited)
- Pride of the Marines (1945) – Uncle Ralph (uncredited)
- I Ring Doorbells (1946) – Shannon
- Night Editor (1946) – Police Captain Lawrence
- Canyon Passage (1946) – Henry McLane (uncredited)
- The Last Crooked Mile (1946) – Police Lieutenant Blake
- Crack-Up (1946) – First Cop (uncredited)
- The Jolson Story (1946) – Policeman Reilly (uncredited)
- San Quentin (1946) – Warden Kelly
- Nora Prentiss (1947) – San Francisco Homicide Lieutenant
- The Devil Thumbs a Ride (1947) – Detective Owens, San Diego Police
- The Red House (1947) – Dr. Byrne
- The Farmer's Daughter (1947) – Mr. Holstrom
- Time Out of Mind (1947) – Captain Rogers
- Exposed (1947) – Severance
- The Invisible Wall (1947) – Detective Captain R.W. Davis
- Dangerous Years (1947) – Judge Raymond
- The Lady from Shanghai (1947) – Cab Driver
- My Girl Tisa (1948) – Judge (uncredited)
- Mr. Blandings Builds His Dream House (1948) – Tesander
- April Showers (1948) – Policeman (uncredited)
- Fighting Father Dunne (1948) – Thomas Lee, Lawyer
- Big Town Scandal (1948) – Police Captain Henry (uncredited)
- Feudin', Fussin' and A-Fightin' (1948) – Chauncey
- Return of the Bad Men (1948) – Wade Templeton (uncredited)
- Northwest Stampede (1948) – Sam Bennett (uncredited)
- Rustlers (1949) – Sheriff Harmon
- Champion (1949) – Lew
- Tulsa (1949) – Nelse Lansing
- Mr. Soft Touch (1949) – Police Sergeant Garrett
- The Devil's Henchman (1949) – Captain
- Mary Ryan, Detective (1949) – Sawyer
- Tarnished (1950) – Kelsey Bunker
- Singing Guns (1950) – Judge Waller
- The Jackie Robinson Story (1950) – Frank Shaughnessy
- Cow Town (1950) – Sandy Reeves
- Curtain Call at Cactus Creek (1950) – U.S. Marshal Clay
- The Gunfighter (1950) – Chuck (uncredited)
- Three Little Words (1950) – Clanahan
- The Underworld Story (1950) – George 'Parky' Parker
- The Killer That Stalked New York (1950) – Police Officer Houlihan
- Right Cross (1950) – Haggerty (uncredited)
- Where Danger Lives (1950) – Dr. Maynard
- The Sound of Fury (1950) – Mr. Yaeger
- The Flying Missile (1950) – Vice-Admiral Williams
- Hunt the Man Down (1950) – Wallace Bennett
- Al Jennings of Oklahoma (1951) – Fred Salter
- Pride of Maryland (1951) – Walter Shannon
- Blue Blood (1951) – Mr. Buchanan
- The Lemon Drop Kid (1951) – John (policeman)
- The Scarf (1951) – Warden Anderson (uncredited)
- As Young as You Feel (1951) – Detective Kleinbaum (uncredited)
- Behave Yourself! (1951) – Police Officer O'Hara (uncredited)
- Boots Malone (1952) – Colonel Summers (uncredited)
- Flesh and Fury (1952) – Mike Callan – Paul's Father
- High Noon (1952) – Cooper
- The Outcasts of Poker Flat (1952) – Bearded Miner (uncredited)
- Lure of the Wilderness (1952) – Pat McGowan
- Kansas Pacific (1953) – Smokestack
- Cry of the Hunted (1953) – Sheriff Brown
- Roar of the Crowd (1953) – Sam 'Pop' Tracy
- Jack Slade (1953) – Tom Carter
- Phantom Stallion (1954) – Michael Reilly
- Executive Suite (1954) – Ed Benedeck
- Rails Into Laramie (1954) – Judge Pierce
- Witness to Murder (1954) – Captain Donnelly
- The Violent Men (1955) – Purdue
- Not as a Stranger (1955) – Ed – 67 Year Old Patient (uncredited)
- The Tall Men (1955) – Sam
- The Marauders (1955) – John Rutherford
- At Gunpoint (1955) – Marshal MacKay
- Come Next Spring (1956) – Mr. Totter
- The Peacemaker (1956) – Drunken Cowpuncher
- Written on the Wind (1956) – Hoak Wayne
- Duel at Apache Wells (1957) – Wayne Shattuck
- Hell's Crossroads (1957) – Clay Ford
- The Lonely Man (1957) – Dr. Fisher
- The Travellers (1957)
- Touch of Evil (1958) – Chief Gould
- Man or Gun (1958) – Justin Corley
- The Buccaneer (1958) – Tom Carruthers – Captain of the Corinthian
- The Real McCoys (1958) – My Favorite Uncle – Uncle Dave
- Yellowstone Kelly (1959) – Captain of the Far West (uncredited)
- Wild in the Country (1961) – Sam Tyler (uncredited)
- Summer and Smoke (1961) – Dr. Burke (uncredited)
- Gypsy (1962) – Grandpa

== Television ==
| Year | Title | Role | Notes |
|---|---|---|---|
| 1955 | Alfred Hitchcock Presents | Dr. Harner | Season 1 Episode 7: "Breakdown" |
| 1958 | Death Valley Days | Old Gabe (Jim Bridger) | Season 7 Episode 12: "Old Gabe" |
| 1961 | Rawhide | Jeffries | Season 3 Episode 28: "Incident of the Blackstorms" |
| 1961 | The Danny Thomas Show | Jamie | Season 8 Episode 23: "The Scrubwoman" |
