= Jerry Bresler (film producer) =

American film producer (1908–1977)

Jerry Bresler (Jerome S. Bresler: April 13, 1908 in Denver, Colorado – August 23, 1977 in Los Angeles) was an American film producer. He won an Oscar in 1944 as co-producer for Heavenly Music (Best Short Subject, Two-reel) and in 1945 for Stairway to Light (Best Short Subject, one-reel).

== Career ==
He began his film career as a production supervisor. In the late 1930s, he joined MGM as a unit manager and worked on the Dr. Kildare series and other films. After his success with short films (the two Academy Awards, and three other nominations), he began to work on features, producing such films as Richard Fleischer's movie The Vikings in 1958, Sam Peckinpah's Major Dundee (1965) and the James Bond spoof Casino Royale in 1967, and his final film, Pussycat, Pussycat, I Love You.

It was the post-production interference at Columbia Pictures on Major Dundee which for a time gave Bresler a reputation as a studio hatchet-man. The more complicated history of the production has become known over the years, and the editing of the film is seen as one part of that history.

In 1965, he was a member of the jury at the 15th Berlin International Film Festival.

== Filmography ==
- Heavenly Music (short film) (1943)
- Main Street Today (short film) (1944)
- Stairway to Light (short film) (1945)
- A Gun In His Hand (short film) (1945)
- Main Street After Dark (1945)
- Bewitched (1945)
- The Great Morgan (1946)
- The Luckiest Guy in the World (short film) (1946)
- The Arnelo Affair (1947)
- The Web (1947)
- Singapore (1947)
- Another Part of the Forest (1948)
- An Act of Murder (1948)
- Abandoned (1949)
- Convicted (1950)
- The Flying Missile (1950)
- The Mob (1951)
- Assignment – Paris! (1952)
- Where's Raymond? (TV: 1953–1954)
- Spring Reunion (1957)
- Lizzie (1957)
- The Vikings (1958)
- Because They're Young (1960)
- Gidget Goes Hawaiian (1961)
- Diamond Head (1963)
- Gidget Goes to Rome (1963)
- Love Has Many Faces (1965)
- Major Dundee (1965)
- Casino Royale (1967)
- Pussycat, Pussycat, I Love You (1970)
