= Center for Puppetry Arts =

Non-profit museum in Atlanta, Georgia, U.S.

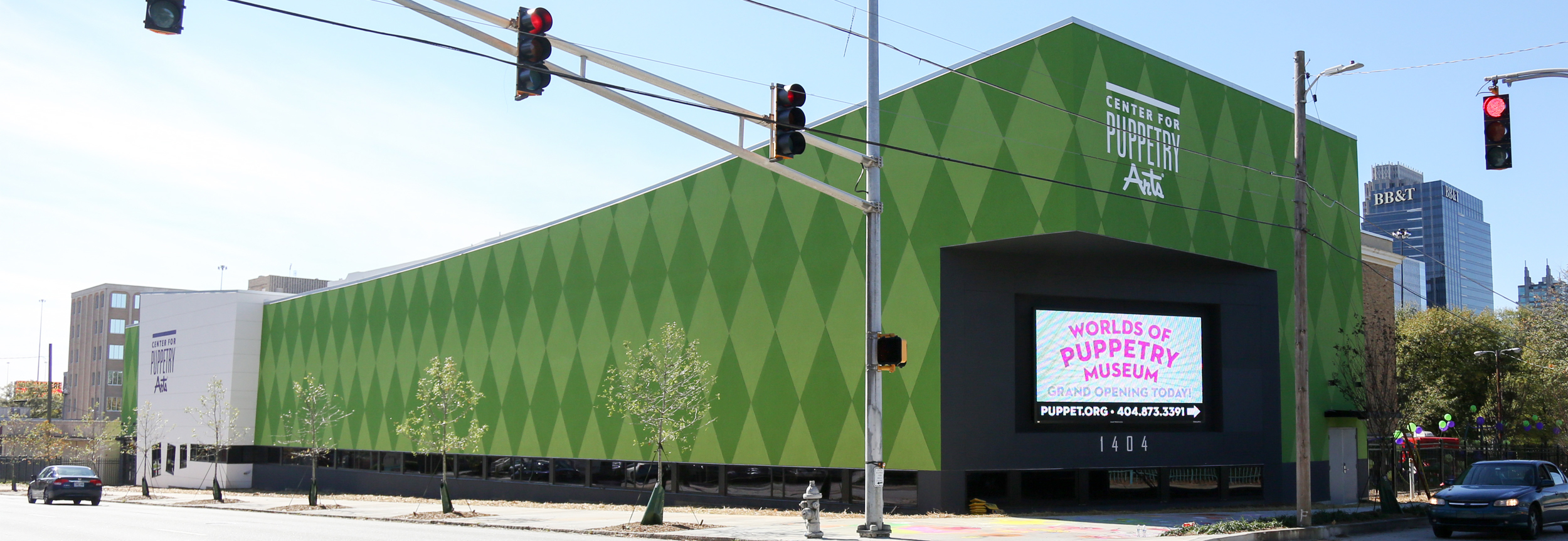

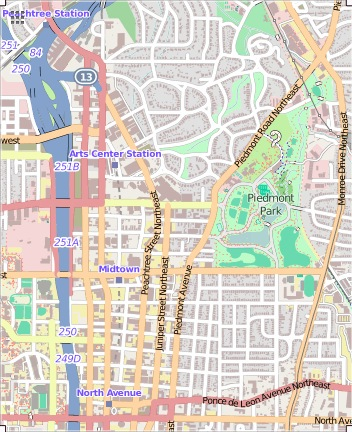
- location in Midtown Atlanta Center for Puppetry Arts (Atlanta) Center for Puppetry Arts (Georgia) Center for Puppetry Arts (the United States)
- Established: 1978
- Location: 1404 Spring Street NW; Atlanta, Georgia
- Coordinates: 33.792494°N 84.38985°W
- Founder: Vincent Anthony
- Public transit access: Arts Center station
- Website: www.puppet.org

The Center for Puppetry Arts, located in Atlanta, is the United States' largest organization dedicated to the art form of puppetry. The center focuses on three areas: performance, education, and museum. It is one of the few puppet museums in the world. The center is located in Midtown, the city's arts district. It was founded in 1978 by Vincent Anthony.

== History ==
The Center for Puppetry Arts opened to the public on September 23, 1978, when Kermit the Frog and his creator Jim Henson cut the ceremonial ribbon.

A young puppeteer from Florida, Vincent Anthony, began touring with Nicolo Marionettes under the tutelage of Nicholas Coppola-based out of New York City. By 1966, he was ready for a smaller community where he could be an active partner and make a difference. Together with Mitchell Edmonds, with whom he'd worked at Nicolo, they decided to move to Atlanta to create their own company - The Vagabond Marionettes. Vince's vision was to create a center that would promote puppetry and become a vital part of the community. They created a successful touring company that traveled around the southeast and presented several seasons at Atlanta's Woodruff Arts Center. In 1978, Anthony found a permanent home in the former Spring Street Elementary School and the center was born. That first season, the center mounted an exhibition of puppets, presented shows for adults and families, and hosted community-based workshops and activities that continue to this day.

Since its inception, the center has worked to serve the diverse populations of Atlanta, the state of Georgia, and the country at large. The Center reaches the community through its focus on core programming: performance, museum and education.

On July 25, 2007, the center announced the opening of a new Jim Henson Wing, which houses anywhere from 500 to 700 retired Muppets, including those from Fraggle Rock, The Muppet Show, and Sesame Street. The new wing also includes films, sketches, and other materials from the Jim Henson Company archives. The wing, which is a part of the center's new building, opened November 14, 2015.

== Performances ==
Each year the Center for Puppetry Arts presents the Family Series, a collection of adapted classic stories and new works performed in a variety of puppetry styles by the center company. Past shows have included an adaptation of The Shoemaker & The Elves set in 1940s Manhattan, Jon Ludwig's Dinosaurs, and The Ghastly Dreadfuls' Compendium of Graveyard Tales and Other Curiosities, a Halloween-themed variety show. Family Performances are made up of shows that the center's company creates/performs, as well as other artists from around the world. National traveling puppetry troupes set up shop at the center during SummerFest and perform a variety of works for families. Included with many Family Performances is a Create-A-Puppet workshop that relates to the show.

The Center for Puppetry Arts also has the New Directions Series which features teen and adult-oriented shows by Atlanta artists and visiting companies. The New Directions Series are known for being more thought-provoking and visually appealing. Each show has a recommended age limit for those attending.

Film Series consists of "classic movies, hidden gems, and contemporary productions." While they are not performances they are productions related to puppetry.

== Education ==
In addition to presenting productions, the center offers a variety of classes and workshops for adults and children alike. Create-A-Puppet Workshops, offered in conjunction with Family Series performances, encourage children to build a puppet of their own that is related to the show. Adults can learn more about different aspects of puppetry in the Adult Education Series. And the Distance Learning program reaches students across the U.S. with a virtual field trip experience. Now many programs and workshops are also available online by recorded playback and live webinar.

== Museum ==
The center's museum and special exhibits present puppets from various time periods and countries around the world. Exhibitions of puppets are considered essential to enhance understanding and appreciation of performances. The Worlds of Puppetry Museum includes the world's largest collection of Jim Henson artifacts and represents one of the largest collections of global puppetry artifacts in the hemisphere. Puppets in the collection include Wayland Flowers' Madame, The Little Players, Skeksis from the film The Dark Crystal, two of the mask prototypes created by Julie Taymor for the Broadway smash-hit, The Lion King, Tom Servo and Crow T. Robot from Mystery Science Theater 3000, and Jim Henson's Muppets, including Rowlf the Dog, Ernie, Swedish Chef, Pigs In Space, and Dr. Teeth and the Electric Mayhem. The Museum includes a library of puppetry art.

== Awards ==
The Ford Foundation selected the center as one of 28 national organizations to be recognized for success in management and innovative programs. The Kresge Foundation awarded the center three different grants to support its capital campaigns. The center was also the only theater group chosen by the 1996 Olympics to participate in all four years of its arts festival program, garnering recognition from Newsweek as "one of the most exciting companies in American theater." In 2008, the education department of the center received the Microsoft Education Award, as a Laureate of the 2008 Tech Museum Awards. The center has been awarded the UNIMA Citation of Excellence, puppetry's highest award, 13 distinct times.
