= Robin Lehman =

American documentary filmmaker (born 1936)

- Born: Robert Owen Lehman Jr. December 3, 1936 (age 89)
- Occupations: Director; Cinematographer
- Spouse: Marie Rolf
- Children: 4
- Parents: Robert Lehman; Ruth "Kitty" Lehman
- Relatives: Lehman family

Robert Owen "Robin" Lehman Jr. (born December 3, 1936) is an American documentary filmmaker, collector of autograph music manuscripts, and glass artist. He won the Academy Award for Best Documentary (Short Subject) in two consecutive years and assembled the Robert Owen Lehman Collection of music manuscripts, held at the Morgan Library & Museum. With his wife, Marie Rolf, he founded the Robert Owen Lehman Foundation, a charitable organization supporting classical music.

== Early life and family ==
Lehman was born in New York City. He is the son of Robert Lehman (1891–1969), the head of Lehman Brothers and an art collector whose bequest of more than 2,600 works to the Metropolitan Museum of Art forms the Robert Lehman Collection. His father was the son of Philip Lehman and grandson of Emanuel Lehman. His mother, Ruth "Kitty" (Leavitt) Lehman (1904–1984), was the daughter of William Homer Leavitt and Ruth Bryan Owen; through his mother, Lehman is the great-grandson of William Jennings Bryan.

Lehman studied painting, figure drawing, and graphic arts. After undergraduate study at Yale University, he moved to Paris, where he studied musical composition with Nadia Boulanger.

== Music manuscript collection ==
Lehman assembled the Robert Owen Lehman Collection of autograph music manuscripts, which has been on deposit at the Morgan Library & Museum since 1972. It is noted for its holdings of French music, particularly Debussy and Ravel, and includes manuscripts such as Bach's Cantata 171, Brahms's Third Symphony, Debussy's Jeux, Liszt's Piano Sonata in B minor, Mahler's Das Lied von der Erde, Mendelssohn's Hebrides overture, nine Mozart symphonies, Ravel's Boléro, Schoenberg's Pierrot lunaire, Schumann's Second Symphony, and Stravinsky's Petrushka. In 2024, the Morgan drew on the collection for the exhibition Crafting the Ballets Russes.

== Film ==
While living in Europe, Lehman began making documentary short films. He won the Academy Award for Best Documentary (Short Subject) in two consecutive years, for Don't (1974) and The End of the Game (1975). He contributed material to Tommy (1975), the film adaptation of the Who's rock opera, and was co-cinematographer of The Black Pearl (1977).

== Glass art ==
After observing glassmaking at the studio of the Corning Museum of Glass, Lehman took up glass art. His work depicts sea creatures, insects, and other natural forms, and includes a series of portraits of composers.

== Benin Bronzes ==
Lehman owned a group of Benin Bronzes (reported as 34 objects), among the works looted from Benin City during the British expedition of 1897. Beginning in 2008, he promised them to the Museum of Fine Arts, Boston (MFA) as a gift to be transferred over time, and five objects entered the museum's collection. As the MFA began exploring the return of the objects to Nigeria, Lehman, who opposed their restitution, requested that the works he still owned be returned to him. In April 2025, after the parties were unable to reach a mutually agreeable resolution, the MFA returned those objects to Lehman and closed its Benin Kingdom gallery; the five bronzes the museum had already acquired remained in its collection.

== Schiele restitution case ==
In 1964, Robert Lehman purchased Egon Schiele's 1917 work Portrait of the Artist's Wife, depicting the artist's wife, Edith, from Marlborough Fine Art in London, and gave it to his son. The work was lost around the time of Lehman's divorce in the 1970s and recovered in 2013. In 2016, after Lehman transferred it to the Robert Owen Lehman Foundation, the foundation consigned the work to Christie's, which identified possible claims that it had been looted during the Nazi era. The foundation filed a declaratory-judgment action in the New York Supreme Court in Rochester seeking to confirm its title, against the heirs of the Viennese Jewish collectors Karl Mayländer and Heinrich Rieger and the Jewish Community of Vienna. Following a trial that began in May 2024, Justice Daniel J. Doyle ruled on August 1, 2024, that Nazi persecution had severed the chain of title; he awarded the work to the heirs of Mayländer and dismissed the Rieger claim. The foundation complied with the ruling.

== Robert Owen Lehman Foundation ==
Lehman and his wife, Marie Rolf, professor emerita of music theory and former senior associate dean of graduate studies at the Eastman School of Music, founded the Robert Owen Lehman Foundation, a private charitable organization based in Rochester, New York, that supports classical music performance and related programs. It is a separate entity from the Robert Lehman Foundation, which supports the visual arts.

== Filmography ==
- 1972 Flyaway
- 1973 Colter's Hell
- 1973 Undercurrents
- 1974 Sea Creatures
- 1974 Don't
- 1974 Experimental
- 1974 Hotspot
- 1975 See
- 1975 The End of the Game
- 1976 Nightlife
- 1978 Manimals
- 1981 Forever Young
- 1981 The Little Players (about the eponymous puppet troupe)
- 1989 The Young Person's Guide to the Orchestra

== Personal life ==
Lehman and Rolf have two children, Rolf and Morgan. He was previously married to Aki Lehman, with whom he has two children, Phillip and Kate.
