= Someone to Remember =

1943 film by Robert Siodmak

- Theatrical release poster
- Directed by: Robert Siodmak
- Screenplay by: Frances Hyland
- Story by: Ben Ames Williams
- Produced by: Robert North
- Starring: Mabel Paige; Harry Shannon; John Craven; Dorothy Morris; Charles Dingle; David Bacon
- Cinematography: Jack A. Marta
- Edited by: Ernest J. Nims
- Music by: Walter Scharf
- Production company: Republic Pictures
- Distributed by: Republic Pictures
- Release date: August 21, 1943
- Running time: 80 minutes
- Country: United States
- Language: English

Someone to Remember is a 1943 American drama film directed by Robert Siodmak and written by Frances Hyland. The film stars Mabel Paige, Harry Shannon, John Craven, Dorothy Morris, Charles Dingle and David Bacon. The film was released on August 21, 1943, by Republic Pictures.

== Plot ==
A college buys her residential building and intends to evict her, but elderly Sarah Freeman explains that she has an iron-clad lease that only she can break. School representative Jim Parsons agrees to let her stay, whereupon incoming male students discover that an old woman will be sharing their dorm.

The boys take a liking to Sarah, who has spent 27 years there waiting for the return of a missing son, unwilling to believe he is gone for good. After she helps a young couple, Lucia and Tom, with their romance and studies, Sarah believes the missing boy is about to visit at long last.

== Cast ==
- Mabel Paige as Mrs. Freeman
- Harry Shannon as Tom Gibbons
- John Craven as Dan Freeman
- Dorothy Morris as Lucia Stanton
- Charles Dingle as Jim Parsons
- David Bacon as Ike Dale
- Peter Lawford as Joe Downes
- Tom Seidel as Bill Hedge
- Richard Crane as Paul Parker
- Chester Clute as Mr. Roseby
- Elizabeth Dunne as Timid Miss Green
- Vera Lewis as Aggressive Miss Green
- John Good as Charlie Horne
- Russell Hicks as Mr. Stanton
- Wilbur Mack as Mr. Thurber
