= Gorgar =

1979 pinball machine

- Arcade flyer
- Manufacturer: Williams Electronics
- Release date: December 1979
- System: Williams System 6
- Design: Barry Oursler
- Programming: Paul Dussault
- Artwork: Constantino Mitchell, Jeanine Mitchell
- Sound: Eugene Jarvis
- Production run: 14,000

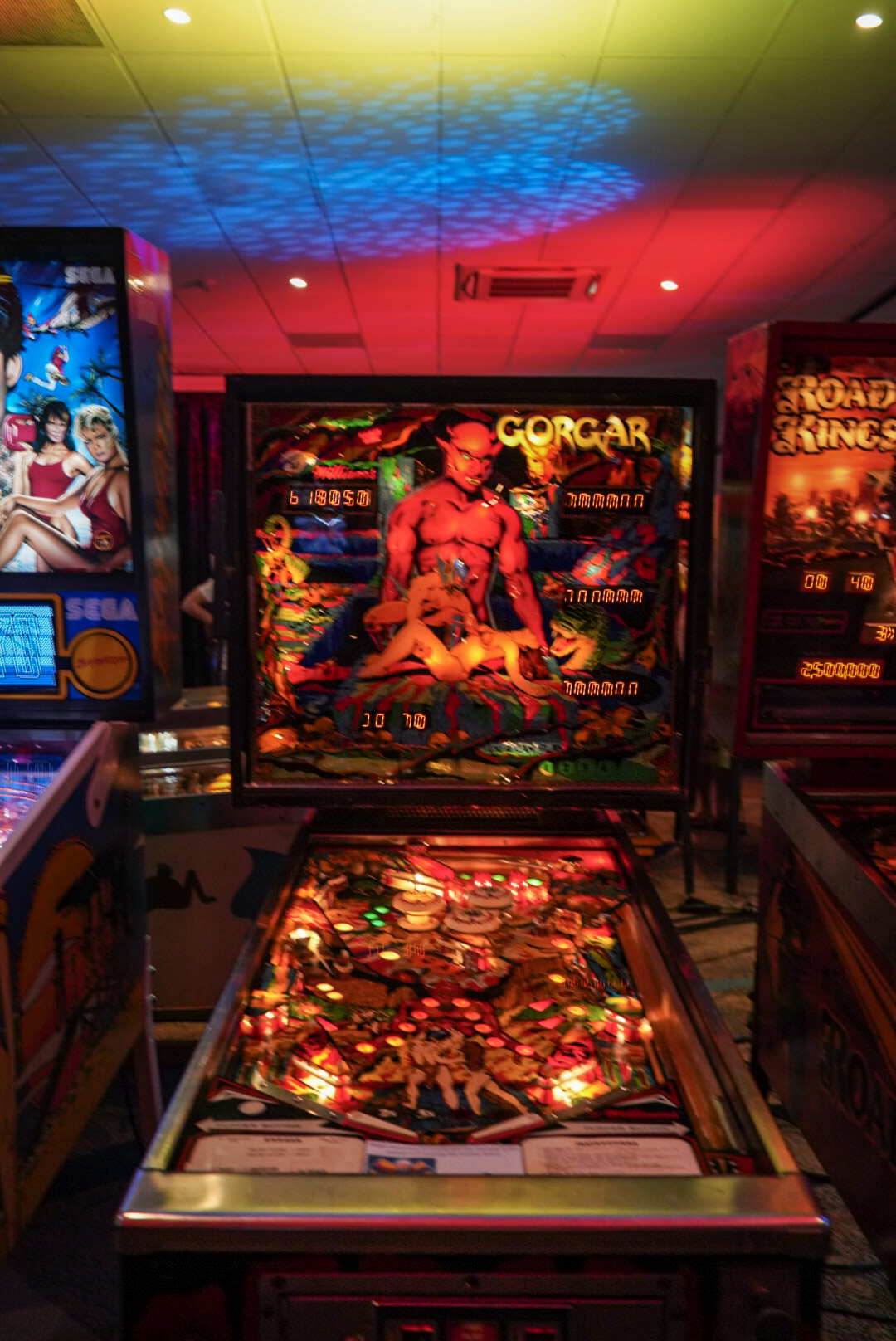
Gorgar at UK Pinfest 2025

Gorgar is a 1979 pinball machine designed by Barry Oursler and released by Williams Electronics. It is the first speech-synthesized ("talking") pinball machine, containing a vocabulary of seven words.

== Design ==
The game was planned for a year before its introduction at the 1979 AMOA show; a single prototype of an earlier game, Disco Fever, with speech was shown at the 1978 AMOA show, but the table never went into production with this feature. The backglass shows an apparent Satanic ritual sacrifice. The artwork on the playfield depicts Gorgar emerging from a pit of fire, engaged in combat with a barbarian. This bears a passing resemblance to the 1978 Boris Vallejo painting In the Underworld.

=== Sound design ===
The game uses its vocabulary of seven words ("Gorgar", "speaks", "beat", "you", "me", "hurt", "got") to combine to form varying broken-English phrases, such as "Gorgar speaks" and "Me got you". The pinball machine also has a heartbeat sound effect that increases in speed during longer gameplay.

The sound board uses a Motorola CVSD chip. The words were played back about 30% slower than they were recorded for a robot-like sound.

The background sound improved on that used on Flash released in January 1979 by using a beating heart sound in the background which got faster the longer the ball was in play and the score increased.

According to the game's programmer, Paul Dussault, "the voice was John Doremus, an announcer in Chicago that we recorded and then digitized his voice. He was the voice of the in flight audio for various airlines. We had tried in house voices but weren’t getting the bass effect we wanted to make Gorgar sound menacing."

A promotional flexi-disc for the machine titled Gorgar Speaks was produced by Bud Solk & Associates. This however credits John Doremus as the announcer, and Tom Erhart as Gorgar.

The designer of the game thought it worked well because the speech was primitive, but so was the creature "Gorgar".

=== General design ===
The game includes a magnet that holds the ball while points are awarded; this feature was taken from a 1971 Williams game called Zodiac.

As part of the marketing for this machine, a 1980 tournament was used to raise money for the American Heart Association.

== Layout ==
At the top of the machine are A-B-C lanes above three thumper bumpers; this area can be reached when the ball is launched from the plunger, or by hitting a lane on the right which contains a spinner. The top left side includes a "snake pit" which can hold the ball with a magnet; just below this are three G-O-R drop targets. In the middle of the playfield are three more drop targets, labelled G-A-R. Towards the lower part of the playfield are four bullseye targets, 1-2-3-4. A single kick-out hole is recessed on the left side.

== Gameplay ==
The player can advance the bonus multiplier by completing the upper rollover lanes. Completing the 1-4 bullseye targets advances the "snake pit" score and its magnet. Completing G-O-R-G-A-R lights the kick-out hole, which can then award an extra ball. A maximum of one extra ball per ordinal ball can be earned.

== Reception ==
In a review for Play Meter Roger Sharpe awarded the game 3/4, praising the artwork both on the playfield and on the backglass, but criticized some aspects of the layout leading to unfair ball drains. He said it had "phenomenal earning potential" due to the novelty of the voice and short games.

RePlay published a special feature about the machine.

== Digital versions ==
FarSight Studios released the table for Pinball Hall of Fame: The Williams Collection on several platforms between 2008 and 2011.

Gorgar was released by the same developer in 2012 alongside Monster Bash as table pack 3 for The Pinball Arcade for multiple platforms, and was available until June 30, 2018, when the license for Williams tables expired.

== In popular culture ==
German power metal band Helloween's 1985 album Walls of Jericho includes a track titled "Gorgar" that symbolizes the machine as a form of gambling addiction.
