= The Little Players =

20th-century American puppetry troupe

The Little Players were a repertory puppet troupe that performed in New York City from 1952 to the early 1980s, producing ballets, operas, and plays. The company consisted of five puppet characters; a single puppeteer, Francis J. Peschka; and W. Gordon Murdock, who provided the costuming, lighting, and musical accompaniment. In 1966, The New Yorker critic Edmund Wilson declared Peschka "the greatest master of glove-puppetry whose work I have ever seen."

== History ==
Francis John Peschka (14 July 1921 – 26 February 1999) and Wilbur Gordon Murdock (14 October 1921 – 2 August 1996) both grew up in St. Louis, Missouri. They met in 1939 while attending the two-year theater school at Washington University in St. Louis and briefly performed together in a local theater company after graduating. Several years later, they met again while volunteering for the American National Theater and Academy in New York City and began living together. In 1952, they staged an impromptu puppet show of Macbeth for two friends in their Lower East Side apartment and continued to perform for small groups. "Our audience began growing by leaps and bounds," Peschka recalled, and by 1960 the pair were able to devote themselves to puppetry full-time.

During its heyday, The Little Players performed to invitation-only audiences of 26 in Peschka and Murdock's Central Park West living room. The troupe became popular among the city's cultural elite, and their devotees included Stella Adler, Leonard Bernstein, Bette Davis, John Gielgud, Edward Gorey, Ethel Merman, Jerome Robbins, and Susan Sontag. The poet James Merrill was particularly fond of The Little Players; he wrote a poem about them, subsidized the company through his Ingram Merrill Foundation, and once unfavorably compared Peter Brook's landmark 1971 Broadway production of A Midsummer Night's Dream to a shoestring performance by The Little Players. "My heart was with the puppets," wrote Merrill, explaining that they affected "a kind of superhuman transparence, a shallowness that left you shattered."

The company never advertised or sold tickets, subsisting on philanthropic grants and $40 "season subscriptions." During their close to 30-year run, The Little Players produced stagings of The Bear by Anton Chekhov, Camille by Alexandre Dumas fils, The Madwoman of Chaillot by Jean Giraudoux, The Importance of Being Earnest by Oscar Wilde, the ballet Giselle, the poetry of Emily Dickinson, and the letters that Queen Victoria wrote to Edward VII when he was a boy. According to the puppetry scholar Kenneth Gross, these works were heavily abridged and altered, with the puppets frequently striking up "conversations with the audience, full of news, rumor, gossip, banter about hidden loves or jealousies, idiosyncrasies of character, private follies or public ambitions."

The Little Players appeared on The Dick Cavett Show several times in 1980. In 1981, they were the subject of a short documentary directed by Robin Lehman; the troupe disbanded in the early 1980s. The original five puppets are on rotating display at the Center for Puppetry Arts in Atlanta, Georgia.
