= Of Pups and Puzzles =

1941 film

- Directed by: George Sidney
- Produced by: John Nesbitt
- Starring: John Nesbitt; Eddy Chandler
- Distributed by: MGM
- Release date: September 6, 1941
- Running time: 10 minutes
- Country: United States
- Language: English

Of Pups and Puzzles is a 1941 American short documentary film directed by George Sidney. It won an Oscar at the 14th Academy Awards, held in 1942, for Best Short Subject (One-Reel).

== Cast ==
- John Nesbitt as Narrator (voice)
- Eddy Chandler as Foreman (uncredited)
- Mark Daniels as First Job Applicant (uncredited)
- William Forrest as Psychiatrist (uncredited)
