= Goodbye, Miss Turlock =

1948 film

- Directed by: Edward L. Cahn
- Written by: John Nesbitt
- Produced by: Herbert Moulton; John Nesbitt
- Starring: John Nesbitt
- Cinematography: Charles Salerno Jr.
- Edited by: Newell P. Kimlin
- Production company: Loew's
- Distributed by: MGM
- Release date: January 24, 1948
- Running time: 11 minutes
- Country: United States
- Language: English

Goodbye, Miss Turlock is a 1948 American short film directed by Edward L. Cahn and starring John Nesbitt and Nana Bryant. It was written by Nesbitt and released as one of the John Nesbitt's Passing Parade series. It won an Oscar at the 20th Academy Awards in 1948 for Best Short Subject (One-Reel).

== Plot ==
The film takes a nostalgic look at an abandoned one-room school somewhere in rural America, seen in the then-present day with its windows boarded up and in disrepair. In flashback, a day in the life of its teacher, the spinster Miss Turlock, is seen, along with various students.

The end of the film shows the school's eventual closure, brought on by improvements in transportation and the rise of central school districts. Miss Turlock's students, now all successful adults, return to the school before its closure to throw a retirement party for Miss Turlock.

== Cast ==
- John Nesbitt as narrator (voice)
- Nana Bryant as Miss Turlock (uncredited)
- Norman Ollestad as 'Irish', spitball sbhooter (uncredited)
