= That Mothers Might Live =

1938 film

- Directed by: Fred Zinnemann
- Written by: Herman Boxer
- Produced by: John Nesbitt
- Starring: Shepperd Strudwick
- Cinematography: Harold Rosson
- Music by: David Snell
- Distributed by: MGM
- Release date: April 30, 1938
- Running time: 10 minutes
- Country: United States
- Language: English

That Mothers Might Live is a 1938 American short drama film directed by Fred Zinnemann. In 1939, at the 11th Academy Awards, it won an Oscar for Best Short Subject (One-Reel).

== Plot ==
The short is a brief account of Hungarian physician Ignaz Semmelweis and his discovery of the need for cleanliness in 19th-century maternity wards, thereby significantly decreasing maternal mortality, and of his struggle to gain acceptance of his idea. Although Semmelweis ultimately failed in his lifetime, later scientific luminaries advanced his work in spirit like microbiologist Louis Pasteur, who provided a scientific theoretical explanation of Semmelweis' observations by helping develop the germ theory of disease, and Dr. Joseph Lister, who revolutionized medicine by putting Pasteur's research to practical use.

== Cast ==
- Shepperd Strudwick as Dr. Ignaz Semmelweis (as Sheppard Strudwick)
- John Nesbitt as Narrator (voice)
