= William E. Doll Jr. =

American educator, author and curriculum theorist

William Elder Doll Jr.
- Born: January 29, 1931
- Died: December 27, 2017 (aged 86); Cobble Hill, British Columbia
- Other name: Bill Doll
- Education: Cornell University, Boston University, Johns Hopkins University
- Known for: Curriculum theory

William Elder Doll Jr. (January 29, 1931 – December 27, 2017) was an American educator, author and curriculum theorist. Doll's scholarly study started in progressivism, moved to Piaget, and gradually shifted to postmodernism, chaos theory and complexity and their implications for school curriculum. Doll is among the first group of scholars who introduced complexity thinking to education in the 1980s.

== Biography ==
William Elder Doll, Jr. was born January 29, 1931. Doll studied philosophy and history at the Cornell University and graduated with a B.A degree in 1953. He obtained a Master of Arts degree in philosophy from the Boston University in 1960. After teaching and administrating in elementary and middle school for 15 years, he obtained a Ph.D. degree in education at the Johns Hopkins University in 1972. After that, he was assistant and associate professor and chair of Education Department at the State University of New York at Oswego (SUNY-Oswego), and then professor and director of Teacher Education at the University of Redlands, and then professor and director of “Holmes” Teacher Education Program at the Louisiana State University (LSU). He held the Vira Franklin & J.R. Eagles endowed Chair as LSU between 1999 and 2007. Doll retired from LSU in 2007. His last position was as an adjunct professor at the University of Victoria and a visiting professor at the University of British Columbia (UBC).

Doll died at the age of 86, on December 27, 2017, in Cobble Hill, British Columbia, Canada.

== Academic work ==
Doll’s 1986 paper Prigogine: A new sense of order, a new curriculum discusses the connections between Newton's world and measured curriculum and the ones between Prigogine's world and transformatory curriculum. Doll writes,

In place of simplicity, spirituality, and uniformity, today we are seeing the world, the universe, and reality itself as a mixture of “the complex, the temporal, and the multiple” (Prigogine & Stengers, 1984, p. xxvii). This new view is one which demands a different paradigm – and educational model – from the one Newton and the measured curriculum have given us. We must go beyond the measured curriculum to a transformatory curriculum

In his 1993 book A Post-modern Perspective on Curriculum, Doll theorizes the concept of post-modern curriculum through drawing on ideas from chaos theory and the works of Dewey, Piaget, Prigogine, Bruner, and Whitehead. The book is partitioned into three parts. "The first part focuses on the closed vision of the modernist paradigm". Part II "analyzes aspects of the post-modern paradigm as this paradigm is developing in the fields of biology, chemistry, mathematical chaos theory, the cognitive revolution, and process thought", and it examines the open vision of the postmodernist paradigm". The third part "explores the educational vision of building a post-modern curriculum matrix - one without 'tops' or 'bottoms,' with no beginnings (in a foundational sense) and no endings (in a terminal sense)". Doll suggests replacing the linear modern curriculum with a nonlinear post-modern curriculum. He offers an example of such a curriculum with his 4Rs (Richness, Relations, Recursion, and Rigor). Doll's 4Rs is viewed as an alternative to Tyler's rationale. After 4Rs, he proposed to approach curriculum via 3Ss (Science, Story, Spirit) and view curriculum as 5Cs (Currere, Complexity, Cosmology, Conversation, Community).

Doll’s 1993 book has been translated into several languages, including Chinese, Spanish, Portuguese, and Hebrew, among others. Particularly in China, the 1993 book is ranked the 7th among the highly cited foreign academic books about pedagogy, while Dewey’s Democracy and Education is ranked the 5th. In 2005, Doll received the Lifetime Achievement Award by the American Educational Research Association and in 2014 received an Honorary Doctorate from the University of Tampere, Finland.
