= The End of the Game (1975 film) =

1975 film

- Directed by: Robin Lehman
- Written by: Robin Lehman
- Produced by: Robin Lehman; Claire Wilbur
- Cinematography: Robin Lehman; Glen Tracy
- Music by: Harry Manfredini; Arlon Ober
- Distributed by: Phoenix Films
- Release date: 1975
- Running time: 29 minutes
- Country: United States
- Language: English

The End of the Game is a 1975 American short documentary film directed by Robin Lehman.

== Summary ==
In the African dawn, thunderclouds gather, welcomed by croaking frogs in the marshes. Monkeys swing on trees, lion cubs pull one another’s tails and the gnu, antelope and giraffe suckle their young. The animals of the savanna hunt and play. The sound of a rifle shatters the magic. Animals disappear - one by one - in a dramatic climax that makes a poignant plea for conservation. Filmed, without spoken commentary, by Robin Lehman in Kenya, Tanzania and Zaire.

== Accolades ==
It won an Oscar at the 48th Academy Awards in 1976 for Documentary Short Subject.

== See also ==
- List of American films of 1975
