= Don't (1974 film) =

1974 film

- DVD cover
- Directed by: Robin Lehman
- Written by: Robin Lehman
- Produced by: Robin Lehman
- Cinematography: Robin Lehman
- Distributed by: Phoenix Films
- Release date: 1974
- Running time: 19 minutes
- Country: United States
- Language: English

Don't is a 1974 short American documentary film following the life cycle of the monarch butterfly, directed by Robin Lehman. It won an Oscar at the 47th Academy Awards in 1975 for Best Documentary Short Subject.
