= John Nesbitt =

Canadian actor, narrator, announcer, producer and screenwriter (1910–1960)

- Nesbitt in 1957
- Born: August 23, 1910; Victoria, British Columbia, Canada
- Died: August 10, 1960 (aged 49); Carmel, California, U.S.
- Occupations: actor, narrator, announcer, producer and screenwriter
- Known for: Passing Parade (1938–1949)

John Booth Nesbitt (August 23, 1910 – August 10, 1960) was an actor, narrator, announcer, producer and screenwriter. Nesbitt was best known as the narrator of the MGM series Passing Parade.

== Early years ==
Nesbitt was born on August 23, 1910, in Victoria, British Columbia, was a grandson of actor Edwin Booth. His father worked in British intelligence during most of Nesbitt's younger years, after which he worked as a lecturer on world topics. Eventually the father became a Unitarian minister, and the family moved to Alameda, California. Booth attended Saint Mary's College of California and the University of California.

== Stage ==
Nesbitt was active in stock theater in Vancouver and Spokane, and he organized some little theater groups.

== Radio ==
Nesbitt began working for NBC in San Francisco in 1933. In 1935, he was an announcer at KFRC in San Francisco.

His signature program, The Passing Parade, was first broadcast in 1936 and ended in 1949, sometimes in 15-minute episodes and sometimes in 30-minute episodes. At one time or another, it was carried on the CBS, Mutual, NBC Blue and NBC Red networks. The Passing Parade was also a segment on The John Charles Thomas Show (1943–1946), and on the summer replacement program, The Meredith Willson-John Nesbitt Show (1942).

In the evening of June 6, 1944, known as D-Day in the Allied countries, Nesbitt broadcast a Passing Parade segment on CBS which captured the historical significance of the military invasion by imagining its story being retold 100 years in the future to schoolchildren.

Joseph M. Koehler described Nesbitt's talent in a review in the July 31, 1943, issue of Billboard: "His sense of the dramatic, uncanny timing and ability to discover the exact moment when drama must replace the spoken word combine to explain why he's radio's No. 1 story-teller."

Nesbitt was also host of the anthology program So the Story Goes, which was syndicated in 1945–1946.

== Personal life ==
In 1940, Nesbitt bought the Ennis House and had it altered by Frank Lloyd Wright, adding a north-terrace pool and ground-floor billiard room, as well as the first heating system for the building.

== Recognition ==
Nesbitt has two stars on the Hollywood Walk of Fame, one at 1717 Vine Street in the Motion Pictures section and one at 6200 Hollywood Boulevard in the Radio section. Both were dedicated February 8, 1960.

== Death ==
Nesbitt died on August 10, 1960, in Carmel, California.

== Partial filmography ==
- That Mothers Might Live (1938) Producer & Narrator
- Main Street on the March! (1941) Producer & Narrator
- Of Pups and Puzzles (1941) Producer & Narrator
- The Woman in the House (1942)
- Stairway to Light (1945) Writer & Narrator
- Goodbye, Miss Turlock (1948) Producer, Writer & Narrator
- Telephone Time (1956–1957) Host, Writer & Narrator
