= Margaret Bert =

American actress (1896–1971)

- Bert in the 1936 film San Francisco
- Born: June 4, 1896; Blackburn, Lancashire, England
- Died: May 1, 1971 (aged 74); Sacramento, California, United States
- Occupation: Actress
- Years active: 1926–64

Margaret Bert (June 4, 1896 – May 1, 1971) was an American character actress who was most active from the 1930s through the 1950s.

She was born on June 4, 1896, in Blackburn, Lancashire. She began her film career during silent films, having a small, unnamed role in the 1926 film The Blackbird, starring Lon Chaney. During her lengthy career, Bert appeared in more than 150 feature films, film shorts, and television shows, mostly in un-credited roles, with many of those being as an unnamed player. Occasionally, she was given a larger supporting role, such as when she was cast as Mrs. Rogers in the 1947 comedy-drama Sarge Goes to College. With the advent of television, she made several appearances on TV, including roles on The Roy Rogers Show, The Adventures of Jim Bowie, and The Walter Winchell File. Her final performance was in a small role on the sitcom Petticoat Junction in 1964.

Bert was a member of the Screen Actors Guild and the Screen Extras Guild.

Bert died on May 1, 1971, in Sacramento, California. She was cremated.
