= Stairway to Light =

1945 film

- Directed by: Sammy Lee
- Written by: John Nesbitt; Rosemary Foster
- Produced by: Herbert Moulton; Jerry Bresler
- Starring: John Nesbitt
- Cinematography: Charles Salerno Jr.
- Edited by: Harry Komer
- Music by: Max Terr
- Distributed by: MGM
- Release date: November 3, 1945
- Running time: 10 minutes
- Country: United States
- Language: English

Stairway to Light is a 1945 American short drama film directed by Sammy Lee. It was one of John Nesbitt's Passing Parade series. Set in Paris during the French Revolution, it tells the story of Philippe Pinel and his efforts in pointing out that the mentally ill should not be treated as animals. In 1946, it won an Oscar for Best Short Subject (One-Reel) at the 18th Academy Awards.

== Synopsis ==
In a museum, somewhere in France, there hangs a famous painting which accords the story of the little men, whom destinies sent down into these dungeons of the buried alive. He was just an unsuccessful family doctor, yet everyone liked him. So, when the French Revolution came along, he was given his first government job, head of a public hospital. That hospital was a madhouse, a position no one else would take, yet, Philippe Pinel, failure as a doctor was going there because inside his small body was a courage-like steel. And that, walk through the streets of Paris, with his pet bird and his pour belongings was leading him to deathless fame, but to reach it, he was going to have to pass through purgatory.

A few hours later, in the dark caves below La Bicetre, an iron door opened, letting the sunlight blind the eyes of those below who lived in perpetual night. Pinel could not believe what he found on his first inspection of the facility. Several of the inmates had been there for 30 years or more and lived in horrible conditions, a prison rather than a hospital.

Thus, in the autumn of 1793, did a humble and modest man discovered that love and kindness are the two greatest medicines known to science, and Dr. Pinel lay down some famous rules. One: hatred of chains had never cured anyone of anything. Two: the mentally sick can be cured. And in the two-year period that followed the arrival of Pinel, more than a hundred suffering souls went up that stairway from darkness into the outer world of the light, and sky and the stars.

His work was not popular and he was beaten on the street only to be rescued by one of the inmates he had released. For by one of the great coincidences of history, the man who had saved his life was Hector Chevigny (early officer of the Royal Navy, then mindless, no longer knowing the meaning of the fleur-de-lis branded on his hand), whose mind had been cured by the kindness of Philippe Pinel.

== Cast ==
- John Nesbitt as narrator (voice)
- Wolfgang Zilzer as Dr. Philippe Pinel (uncredited)
- Harry Cording as townsman in montage (uncredited)
- Lotte Palfi Andor as supporting role (uncredited)
- Dewey Robinson as head keeper – man wiping Pinel's face (uncredited)
- Gene Roth as Hector Chevigny (uncredited)
- Harry Wilson as keeper hosing down mental patient (uncredited)

== Availability ==
Stairway to Light was included on the R1 DVD release of the Hurd Hatfield-starring The Picture of Dorian Gray (1945) as a supplemental bonus feature.
