= Main Street on the March! =

1941 film

- Directed by: Edward Cahn
- Written by: Karl Kamb
- Produced by: John Nesbitt
- Starring: John Nesbitt
- Cinematography: Jackson Rose
- Edited by: Harry Komer
- Music by: David Snell
- Distributed by: MGM
- Release date: 1941
- Running time: 20 minutes
- Country: United States
- Language: English

Main Street on the March! is a 1941 American short historical film directed by Edward Cahn. It won an Academy Award at the 14th Academy Awards for Best Short Subject (Two-Reel). The 20-minute film gives a brief history of events in Europe and the U.S. in the year and a half leading up to the attack on Pearl Harbor.

== Cast ==
- John Nesbitt - Narrator (voice)
- Raymond Gram Swing - Himself (voice) (archive sound)
- Neville Chamberlain - Himself (voice) (archive sound)
- H. V. Kaltenborn - Himself (voice) (archive sound)
- Franklin Delano Roosevelt - Himself (archive footage)
- Winston Churchill - Himself (voice) (archive footage)
- George C. Marshall - Himself (archive footage)
- William S. Knudsen - Himself (archive footage)
- Admiral Harold R. Stark - Himself (archive footage)

Robert Blake, then 8 years old, makes an appearance in a kitchen scene.
