= 1938 in film =

The year 1938 in film involved some significant events, notably the release of Sergei Eisenstein's classic historical drama, Alexander Nevsky, with a score by Sergei Prokofiev, it was Eisenstein's first sound film. Leni Riefenstahl's documentary Olympia, a propaganda film documenting the 1936 Summer Olympics in Berlin, proves both controversial and influential.

== Events ==
- January – MGM announces that Judy Garland will be cast in the role of Dorothy Gale in the upcoming The Wizard of Oz film. Ray Bolger is cast as the Tin Woodman and Buddy Ebsen as the Scarecrow. At Bolger's insistence, the roles are switched between the two actors. On July 25, MGM announces Bert Lahr has been cast as the Cowardly Lion.
- January 21 – Pioneering French film director Georges Méliès, best remembered for groundbreaking films like A Trip to the Moon and The Impossible Voyage, dies in Paris, aged 76.
- February 4 – Walt Disney's Snow White and the Seven Dwarfs, the first-ever American full-length animated feature film, is released nationally in the United States, less than two months after its premiere in Los Angeles. The film is a huge box office success, and briefly holds the record as the highest-grossing sound film of all time.
- February 24 – The entertainment trade newspaper Variety confirms that the film studio Metro-Goldwyn-Mayer (MGM) had bought the rights to adapt L. Frank Baum’s beloved children's novel The Wonderful Wizard of Oz for the screen.
- March 12 – Child star Peggy Ann Garner progresses from modelling to an acting role in Little Miss Thoroughbred, which would be her screen debut.
- April 5 – Noel Langley completes the first script for The Wizard of Oz.
- April 20 – Leonard Slye appears for the first time on film as Roy Rogers in Under Western Stars. He becomes one of the most popular Western stars being ranked number one from 1943 to 1952 and would become known as "King of the Cowboys".
- May 7 – Lyricist Yip Harburg and composer Harold Arlen begin work on the musical score for The Wizard of Oz.
- May 14 – Release of Warner Bros.' epic swashbuckler film The Adventures of Robin Hood, starring Errol Flynn and Olivia de Havilland. Critically acclaimed for its vivid use of Technicolor, as well as its memorable action scenes, the film goes on to win three Academy Awards.
- June 17 – Popular Australian comedian George Wallace stars in the first of his two films with Cinesound Productions, Let George Do It.
- August 3 – Former silent film star Pearl White goes into a coma in a nursing home in France, suffering from cirrhosis of the liver.
- October 7 – The Lady Vanishes, directed by Alfred Hitchcock and the first feature film released under a distribution deal between UK's Gaumont-British Picture Corporation and the US Metro-Goldwyn-Mayer (MGM), is released in London cinemas.
- October 13 – Filming starts on The Wizard of Oz on the Metro-Goldwyn-Mayer studio lot in Culver City, California, initially with Richard Thorpe as director.
- October 21 – Buddy Ebsen suffers from a near fatal allergic reaction to the aluminum dust used in his Tin Woodman make-up on the set of The Wizard of Oz. Ebsen is replaced by Jack Haley.
- December 22 – MGM's first feature film in three-strip Technicolor, Sweethearts, starring Jeanette MacDonald and Nelson Eddy, is released.
- December 23 – Margaret Hamilton is severely burned during a mishap on the set of The Wizard of Oz. Hamilton, cast in the role of the Wicked Witch of the West, leaves the film for six weeks.
- Orson Welles makes Too Much Johnson, starring Joseph Cotten. It is never completed and first released only in 2013.
- Producer George Minter establishes Renown Pictures, a British film distributor.

== Academy Awards ==
- Best Picture: You Can't Take It with You – Columbia
- Best Director: Frank Capra – You Can't Take It with You
- Best Actor: Spencer Tracy – Boys Town
- Best Actress: Bette Davis – Jezebel
- Best Supporting Actor: Walter Brennan – Kentucky
- Best Supporting Actress: Fay Bainter – Jezebel

== Top-grossing films (U.S.) ==
The top ten 1938 released films by box office gross in North America are as follows:

Highest-grossing films of 1938
Rank	Title	Distributor	Domestic rentals
1	Snow White and the Seven Dwarfs	RKO/Walt Disney	$3,996,000
2	Boys Town	MGM	$2,828,000
3	Alexander's Ragtime Band	20th Century Fox	$2,630,000
4	Test Pilot	MGM	$2,431,000
5	You Can't Take It with You	Columbia	$2,182,000
6	Sweethearts	MGM	$2,017,000
7	In Old Chicago	20th Century Fox	$1,964,000
8	The Adventures of Robin Hood	Warner Bros.	$1,928,000
9	Love Finds Andy Hardy	MGM	$1,637,000
10	Marie Antoinette	MGM	$1,633,000

== Notable films ==
United States unless stated

=== A ===
- Adiós Buenos Aires, directed by Leopoldo Torres Ríos, starring Amelia Bence – (Argentina)
- The Adventures of Marco Polo, directed by Archie Mayo, starring Gary Cooper and Basil Rathbone
- The Adventures of Robin Hood, directed by Michael Curtiz, starring Errol Flynn, Olivia de Havilland, Basil Rathbone and Claude Rains
- The Adventures of Tom Sawyer, directed by Norman Taurog, starring Tommy Kelly
- Águila o sol (Heads or Tails), directed by Arcady Boytler, starring Cantinflas – (Mexico)
- Alexander Nevsky, directed by Sergei Eisenstein, starring Nikolay Cherkasov – (USSR)
- Alexander's Ragtime Band, directed by Henry King, starring Tyrone Power, Alice Faye, Don Ameche and Ethel Merman
- Algiers, directed by John Cromwell, starring Charles Boyer and Hedy Lamarr
- The Amazing Dr. Clitterhouse, directed by Anatole Litvak, starring Edward G. Robinson, Claire Trevor and Humphrey Bogart
- Angels with Dirty Faces, directed by Michael Curtiz, starring James Cagney, Pat O'Brien, Humphrey Bogart, Ann Sheridan and the Dead End Kids

=== B ===
- The Baker's Wife (La femme du boulanger), directed by Marcel Pagnol, starring Raimu – (France)
- Bank Holiday, starring Margaret Lockwood – (GB)
- La Bête humaine (The Human Beast), directed by Jean Renoir, starring Jean Gabin and Simone Simon – (France)
- The Big Broadcast of 1938, directed by Mitchell Leisen, starring W.C. Fields, Martha Raye, Dorothy Lamour and Bob Hope
- Billy the Kid Returns, directed by Joseph Kane, starring Roy Rogers and Smiley Burnette
- Block-Heads, directed by John G. Blystone, starring Laurel and Hardy
- Blondie, directed by Frank R. Strayer, starring Penny Singleton
- Bluebeard's Eighth Wife, directed by Ernst Lubitsch, starring Gary Cooper, Claudette Colbert and David Niven
- Boys Town, directed by Norman Taurog, starring Spencer Tracy and Mickey Rooney
- Bringing Up Baby, directed by Howard Hawks, starring Katharine Hepburn and Cary Grant
- The Buccaneer, directed by Cecil B. DeMille, starring Fredric March

=== C ===
- Carefree, directed by Mark Sandrich, starring Fred Astaire, Ginger Rogers and Ralph Bellamy
- Carmen, la de Triana (Carmen, the Girl from Triana), directed by Florián Rey, starring Imperio Argentina – (Spain/Germany)
- Charlie Chan in Honolulu, directed by H. Bruce Humberstone, starring Sidney Toler
- A Christmas Carol, directed by Edwin L. Marin, starring Reginald Owen
- The Citadel, directed by King Vidor, starring Robert Donat and Rosalind Russell – (GB)
- Climbing High, directed by Carol Reed, starring Jessie Matthews and Michael Redgrave – (GB)
- Cocoanut Grove, directed by Alfred Santell, starring Fred MacMurray
- College Swing, directed by Raoul Walsh, starring George Burns, Gracie Allen, Martha Raye and Bob Hope
- Convict 99, directed by Marcel Varnel, starring Will Hay, Moore Marriott and Graham Moffatt – (GB)
- Crime School, directed by Lewis Seiler, starring the Dead End Kids and Humphrey Bogart
- The Crowd Roars, directed by Richard Thorpe, starring Robert Taylor and Maureen O'Sullivan

=== D ===
- Dangerous to Know, directed by Robert Florey, starring Anna May Wong and Akim Tamiroff
- The Dawn Patrol, directed by Edmund Goulding, starring Errol Flynn, Basil Rathbone and David Niven
- Diao Chan, directed by Bu Wancang – (China)
- The Divorce of Lady X, directed by Tim Whelan, starring Merle Oberon, Laurence Olivier and Ralph Richardson – (GB)
- The Drum, directed by Zoltan Korda, starring Sabu and Raymond Massey – (GB)
- Ducháček Will Fix It (Ducháček to zařídí), directed by Karel Lamač – (Czechoslovakia)

=== F ===
- Ferdinand the Bull, a Disney animated short
- Fools for Scandal, directed by Mervyn LeRoy, starring Carole Lombard and Ralph Bellamy
- The Four Companions (Die vier Gesellen), directed by Carl Froelich, starring Ingrid Bergman – (Germany)
- Four Daughters, directed by Michael Curtiz, starring the Lane Sisters, Claude Rains and John Garfield
- Four Men and a Prayer, directed by John Ford, starring Loretta Young, Richard Greene, George Sanders and David Niven
- Four's a Crowd, directed by Michael Curtiz, starring Errol Flynn, Olivia de Havilland, Rosalind Russell and Patric Knowles

=== G ===
- The Gaunt Stranger, directed by Walter Forde, starring Sonnie Hale – (GB)
- The Girl of the Golden West, directed by Robert Z. Leonard, starring Jeanette MacDonald, Nelson Eddy and Walter Pidgeon
- Give Me a Sailor, directed by Elliott Nugent, starring Martha Raye, Bob Hope and Betty Grable
- Gold Is Where You Find It, directed by Michael Curtiz, starring George Brent, Olivia de Havilland and Claude Rains

=== H ===
- Hard to Get, directed by Ray Enright, starring Dick Powell and Olivia de Havilland
- Having Wonderful Time, directed by Alfred Santell, starring Ginger Rogers, Douglas Fairbanks Jr. and Lucille Ball
- Her Jungle Love, directed by George Archainbaud, starring Dorothy Lamour and Ray Milland
- Holiday, directed by George Cukor, starring Katharine Hepburn and Cary Grant
- Honeysuckle (Madreselva), directed by Luis César Amadori, starring Libertad Lamarque – (Argentina)
- Hotel du Nord, directed by Marcel Carné – (France)

=== I ===
- I Am the Law, directed by Alexander Hall, starring Edward G. Robinson
- If I Were King, directed by Frank Lloyd, starring Ronald Colman and Basil Rathbone
- In Old Chicago, directed by Henry King, starring Tyrone Power, Alice Faye and Don Ameche
- Inspector Hornleigh, directed by Eugene Forde, starring Gordon Harker and Alastair Sim – (GB)
- International Settlement, directed by Eugene Forde, starring Dolores del Río and George Sanders

=== J ===
- J'accuse!, directed by Abel Gance – (France)
- Jezebel, directed by William Wyler, starring Bette Davis, Henry Fonda and George Brent
- Judge Hardy's Children, directed by George B. Seitz, starring Lewis Stone, Mickey Rooney, Cecilia Parker and Fay Holden
- Just Around the Corner, directed by Irving Cummings, starring Shirley Temple

=== K ===
- Kentucky, directed by David Butler, starring Loretta Young, Richard Greene and Walter Brennan
- Kentucky Moonshine, directed by David Butler, starring the Ritz Brothers
- Kidnapped, directed by Alfred L. Werker, starring Warner Baxter and Freddie Bartholomew
- Kilómetro 111, directed by Mario Soffici – (Argentina)
- The King Kong That Appeared in Edo (Edo ni Arawareta Kingu Kongu) (lost), directed by Sōya Kumagai – (Japan)

=== L ===
- The Lady Vanishes, directed by Alfred Hitchcock, starring Margaret Lockwood and Michael Redgrave – (GB)
- Listen, Darling, directed by Edwin L. Marin, starring Judy Garland, Freddie Bartholomew, Mary Astor and Walter Pidgeon
- Little Miss Broadway, directed by Irving Cummings, starring Shirley Temple, Edna May Oliver and Jimmy Durante
- Little Tough Guy, directed by Harold Young, starring the Dead End Kids
- Lord Jeff, directed by Sam Wood, starring Freddie Bartholomew, Mickey Rooney and Charles Coburn
- Love Finds Andy Hardy, directed by George B. Seitz, starring Lewis Stone, Mickey Rooney, Judy Garland, Cecilia Parker, Fay Holden and Lana Turner

=== M ===
- Mad About Music, directed by Norman Taurog, starring Deanna Durbin and Herbert Marshall
- The Mad Miss Manton, directed by Leigh Jason, starring Barbara Stanwyck and Henry Fonda
- A Man to Remember, directed by Garson Kanin, starring Anne Shirley
- Marie Antoinette, directed by W. S. Van Dyke, starring Norma Shearer, Tyrone Power, John Barrymore and Robert Morley
- Men with Wings, directed by William A. Wellman, starring Fred MacMurray and Ray Milland
- Merrily We Live, directed by Norman Z. McLeod, starring Constance Bennett, Brian Aherne and Billie Burke
- Mollenard, directed by Robert Siodmak, starring Harry Baur – (France)
- Mother Carey's Chickens, directed by Rowland V. Lee, starring Anne Shirley
- The Mountain Calls (Der Berg ruft), directed by Luis Trenker – (Germany)
- Mr. Moto's Gamble, directed by James Tinling, starring Peter Lorre
- Mr. Wong, Detective, directed by William Nigh, starring Boris Karloff
- My Bill, directed by John Farrow, starring Kay Francis and Dickie Moore

=== O ===
- Of Human Hearts, directed by Clarence Brown, starring Walter Huston, James Stewart and Beulah Bondi
- Old Bones of the River, directed by Marcel Varnel, starring Will Hay, Moore Marriott and Graham Moffatt – (GB)
- Olympia, documentary directed by Leni Riefenstahl – (Germany)
- Out West with the Hardys, directed by George B. Seitz, starring Lewis Stone, Mickey Rooney, Cecilia Parker and Fay Holden

=== P ===
- Paradise for Three, directed by Edward Buzzell, starring Frank Morgan, Robert Young and Mary Astor
- Paweł i Gaweł (Pawel and Gawel), directed by Mieczysław Krawicz – (Poland)
- Port of Seven Seas, directed by James Whale, starring Wallace Beery, Frank Morgan and Maureen O'Sullivan
- Port of Shadows (Le Quai des brumes), directed by Marcel Carné, starring Jean Gabin, Michel Simon and Michèle Morgan – (France)
- Prison Break, directed by Arthur Lubin, starring Barton MacLane and Glenda Farrell
- Professor Beware, directed by Elliott Nugent, starring Harold Lloyd
- Professor Mamlock, directed by Herbert Rappaport – (USSR)
- Pygmalion, directed by Anthony Asquith, starring Leslie Howard and Wendy Hiller – (GB)

=== R ===
- Rawhide, directed by Ray Taylor, starring Lou Gehrig
- Rebecca of Sunnybrook Farm, directed by Allan Dwan, starring Shirley Temple, Randolph Scott and Gloria Stuart
- Red River Range, directed by George Sherman, starring John Wayne
- Room Service, directed by William A. Seiter, starring the Marx Brothers and Lucille Ball

=== S ===
- The Saint in New York, directed by Ben Holmes, starring Louis Hayward
- Save a Little Sunshine, directed by Norman Lee, starring Patricia Kirkwood and Tommy Trinder – (GB)
- The Shopworn Angel, directed by H. C. Potter, starring Margaret Sullavan, James Stewart and Walter Pidgeon
- Sidewalks of London, directed by Tim Whelan, starring Charles Laughton, Vivien Leigh and Rex Harrison – (GB)
- Sing You Sinners, directed by Wesley Ruggles, starring Bing Crosby, Fred MacMurray and Donald O'Connor
- The Sisters, directed by Anatole Litvak, starring Errol Flynn and Bette Davis
- Sixty Glorious Years, directed by Herbert Wilcox, starring Anna Neagle – (GB)
- A Slight Case of Murder, directed by Lloyd Bacon, starring Edward G. Robinson
- Suez, directed by Allan Dwan, starring Tyrone Power and Loretta Young
- Sweethearts, directed by W. S. Van Dyke, starring Jeanette MacDonald, Nelson Eddy and Frank Morgan

=== T ===
- The Terror of Tiny Town, directed by Sam Newfield, starring Billy Curtis
- Test Pilot, directed by Victor Fleming, starring Clark Gable, Myrna Loy, Spencer Tracy and Lionel Barrymore
- That Certain Age, directed by Edward Ludwig, starring Deanna Durbin, Melvyn Douglas and Jackie Cooper
- There Goes My Heart, Norman Z. McLeod, starring Fredric March and Virginia Bruce
- They Drive by Night, directed by Arthur B. Woods, starring Emlyn Williams and Ernest Thesiger – (GB)
- Three Comrades, directed by Frank Borzage, starring Robert Taylor, Margaret Sullavan, Franchot Tone and Robert Young
- Tom Sawyer, Detective, directed by Louis King, starring Donald O'Connor
- Too Hot to Handle, directed by Jack Conway, starring Clark Gable, Myrna Loy and Walter Pidgeon

=== U-V ===
- Urlaub auf Ehrenwort (Leave on Parole), directed by Karl Ritter – (Germany)
- Valley of the Giants, directed by William Keighley, starring Wayne Morris and Claire Trevor
- Vivacious Lady, directed by George Stevens, starring Ginger Rogers and James Stewart
- Volga-Volga, directed by Grigori Aleksandrov, starring Lyubov Orlova – (USSR)
- La vuelta al nido, directed by Leopoldo Torres Ríos, starring José Gola and Amelia Bence – (Argentina)

=== W ===
- We're Going to Be Rich, directed by Monty Banks starring Gracie Fields, Victor McLaglen and Brian Donlevy – (GB)
- White Banners, directed by Edmund Goulding, starring Claude Rains and Jackie Cooper
- Woman Against Woman, directed by Robert B. Sinclair, starring Herbert Marshall, Virginia Bruce and Mary Astor
- A Woman's Face (En kvinnas ansikte), directed by Gustaf Molander, starring Ingrid Bergman – (Sweden)

=== Y ===
- Yahya el Hub, directed by Mohammed Karim, starring Mohammed Abdel Wahab and Leila Mourad – (Egypt)
- A Yank at Oxford, directed by Jack Conway, starring Robert Taylor, Lionel Barrymore, Maureen O'Sullivan, Vivien Leigh and Edmund Gwenn – (GB)
- You Can't Take It with You, directed by Frank Capra, starring Jean Arthur, Lionel Barrymore, James Stewart and Edward Arnold
- Young Dr. Kildare, directed by Harold S. Bucquet, starring Lew Ayres and Lionel Barrymore
- The Young in Heart, directed by Richard Wallace, starring Janet Gaynor, Douglas Fairbanks Jr., Paulette Goddard and Billie Burke

=== Z ===
- La Zandunga, directed by Fernando de Fuentes, starring Lupe Vélez and Arturo de Córdova – (Mexico)

== 1938 film releases ==
=== January–March ===
- January 1938
  - January 7
    - Bulldog Drummond's Revenge
    - The Patient in Room 18
    - In Old Chicago
- February 1938
  - February 4
    - Snow White and the Seven Dwarfs
    - The Buccaneer
  - February 11
    - Gold is Where You Find It
    - Scandal Street
  - February 18
    - Daredevil Drivers
    - The Big Broadcast of 1938
- March 1938
  - March 18
    - Bulldog Drummond's Peril
  - March 25
    - Bluebeard's Eighth Wife
    - Jezebel

=== April–June ===
- April 1938
  - April 1
    - Tip-Off Girls
  - April 7
    - The Adventures of Marco Polo
  - April 8
    - Romance in the Dark
  - April 15
    - The Feud Maker
    - Fools for Scandal
    - Her Jungle Love
  - April 22
    - Test Pilot
- May 1938
  - May 7
  - May 13
    - The Adventures of Robin Hood
    - Stolen Heaven
  - May 20
    - Cocoanut Grove
  - May 27
    - Hunted Men
- June 1938
  - June 2
    - Three Comrades
  - June 17
    - Prison Farm

=== July–September ===
- July 1938
  - July 8
    - Marie Antoinette
  - July 29
    - Booloo
    - Professor Beware
    - The Chaser
- August 1938
  - August 5
    - Alexander's Ragtime Band
    - Bulldog Drummond in Africa
  - August 9
    - Four Daughters
  - August 12
    - The Texans
  - August 19
    - Give Me a Sailor
  - August 26
    - Spawn of the North
- September 1938
  - September 9
    - Boys Town
  - September 16
    - Too Hot to Handle
  - September 29
    - You Can't Take It with You

=== October–December ===
- October 1938
  - October 14
    - Young Dr. Kildare
  - October 28
    - The Citadel
    - Men with Wings
- November 1938
  - November 11
    - If I Were King
- December 1938
  - December 22
    - Sweethearts

== Serials ==
- Dick Tracy Returns, starring Ralph Byrd
- The Fighting Devil Dogs, starring Lee Powell and Herman Brix
- Flaming Frontiers
- Flash Gordon's Trip to Mars, starring Buster Crabbe
- The Great Adventures of Wild Bill Hickok
- Hawk of the Wilderness, starring Herman Brix
- The Lone Ranger
- The Secret of Treasure Island
- The Spider's Web
- Red Barry

== Comedy film series ==
- Harold Lloyd (1913–1938)
- Charlie Chaplin (1914–1940)
- Lupino Lane (1915–1939)
- Buster Keaton (1917–1944)
- Laurel and Hardy (1921–1945)
- Our Gang (1922–1944)
- Marx Brothers (1929–1937)
- The Three Stooges (1934–1959)

== Animated short film series ==
- Krazy Kat (1925–1940)
- Oswald the Lucky Rabbit (1927-1938)
- Mickey Mouse (1928–1953)
- Silly Symphonies
  - The Moth and the Flame
  - Wynken, Blynken and Nod
  - Farmyard Symphony
  - Merbabies
  - Mother Goose Goes Hollywood
- Screen Songs (1929-1938)
- Looney Tunes (1930–1969)
- Terrytoons (1930–1964)
- Merrie Melodies (1931–1969)
- Scrappy (1931–1941)
- Betty Boop (1932–1939)
- Popeye (1933–1957)
- Happy Harmonies (1934-1938)
- Color Rhapsodies (1934–1949)
- Donald Duck (1937–1956)
- Walter Lantz Cartunes (also known as New Universal Cartoons or Cartune Comedies) (1938–1942)
- The Captain and the Kids (1938–1939)

== Births ==
- January 1 – Frank Langella, American actor
- January 3 – Tom Bower, American actor (died 2024)
- January 4 – Jim Norton, Irish character actor
- January 6
  - Michael Graham Cox, English actor (died 1995)
  - Larisa Shepitko, Soviet director (died 1979)
- January 8 – Bob Eubanks, American television personality and game show host
- January 9 – Nobuhiko Obayashi, Japanese filmmaker (died 2020)
- January 12 – Lewis Fiander, Australian actor (died 2016)
- January 13
  - William B. Davis, Canadian actor
  - Billy Gray, American actor
- January 14 – Jack Jones, American singer, actor (died 2024)
- January 16 – Michael Pataki, American actor (died 2010)
- January 21 – John Savident, British actor (died 2024)
- January 26 – Henry Jaglom, American director and actor (died 2025)
- January 28 – Paula Alí, Cuban actress (died 2026)
- January 29 – Aminah Cendrakasih, Indonesian actress (died 2022)
- February 1 - Sherman Hemsley, American actor (died 2012)
- February 2 – Bo Hopkins, American actor (died 2022)
- February 3
  - Marshall Efron, American actor (died 2019)
  - John Mahon, American actor (died 2020)
  - Victor Buono, American actor (died 1982)
- February 9 - Fred Williams, German actor
- February 13 – Oliver Reed, English actor (died 1999)
- February 16 - Barry Primus, American actor, director and writer
- February 17 – Yvonne Romain, English actress
- February 19 – René Muñoz, Cuban-born actor, Mexico-based screenwriter (died 2000)
- February 20 – Richard Beymer, American actor and film maker
- February 22 – Karin Dor, German actress (died 2017)
- February 23
  - Alan Ford, English actor
  - Jiří Menzel, Czech director (died 2020)
  - Diane Varsi, American actress (died 1992)
- February 24
  - James Farentino, American actor (died 2012)
  - Robert A. Silverman, Canadian actor
- February 25
  - Diane Baker, American actress and producer
  - Malcolm Tierney, English actor (died 2014)
- March 2 – BarBara Luna, American actress
- March 4 – Paula Prentiss, American actress
- March 5 – Fred Williamson, American actor
- March 8 – George Innes, British actor
- March 9 – Charles Siebert, American actor and television director (died 2022)
- March 10 – Micole Mercurio, American actress (died 2016)
- March 18
  - Carl Gottlieb, American screenwriter, actor and comedian
  - Shashi Kapoor, Indian actor (died 2017)
- March 25 – Hoyt Axton, American country music singer-songwriter, actor (died 1999)
- April 2 – Hans-Michael Rehberg, German actor (died 2017)
- April 6 – Roy Thinnes, American actor
- April 15 – Claudia Cardinale, Italian actress (died 2025)
- April 20 – Michael Greer, American actor and comedian (died 2002)
- April 21 – Reni Santoni, American actor (died 2020)
- April 23 – Katsuo Nakamura, Japanese actor
- April 28 – Madge Sinclair, Jamaican actress (died 1995)
- May 5
  - Michael Murphy, American actor
  - Jerzy Skolimowski, Polish director, screenwriter and actor
- May 6 – Hartmut Becker, German actor (died 2022)
- May 11 – Judy Farrell, American actress (died 2023)
- May 12 – Luana Anders, American actress (died 1996)
- May 13 – Buck Taylor, American actor
- May 17 – Jason Bernard, American actor (died 1996)
- May 19 – Bryan Marshall, British actor (died 2019)
- May 20
  - Rainer Basedow, German actor (died 2022)
  - Ted Rusoff, Canadian actor (died 2013)
- May 22
  - Richard Benjamin, American actor, director
  - Frank Converse, American actor
  - John Nolan, British actor (died 2026)
  - Susan Strasberg, American actress (died 1999)
- May 23 - Robert Watts, British film producer (died 2024)
- May 24 – Tommy Chong, Canadian-American actor, writer, director, musician and comedian
- June 7 – Ann Beach, British actress (died 2017)
- June 12 – Tom Oliver, Australian actor
- June 16
  - Michael Culver, English actor (died 2024)
  - Helen Ryan, British actress
- June 18 – Michael Sheard, Scottish actor (died 2005)
- June 19 - Ian Smith, Australian actor
- June 21
  - Ron Ely, American actor (died 2024)
  - Celia Rodriguez, Filipina actress
- June 25 – Giampiero Littera, Italian actor
- July 6 – Luana Patten, American actress (died 1996)
- July 8 – Andrey Myagkov, Soviet/Russian actor (died 2021)
- July 9 – Brian Dennehy, American actor (died 2020)
- July 11 – Jiří Krampol, Czech actor (died 2025)
- July 18 – Paul Verhoeven, Dutch director
- July 20
  - Diana Rigg, English actress (died 2020)
  - Natalie Wood, American actress (died 1981)
- July 22 – Terence Stamp, English actor (died 2025)
- July 23 – Ronny Cox, American actor, singer-songwriter
- July 25
  - Pilar Seurat, Philippine-American actress (died 2001)
  - Renée Victor, American actress (died 2025)
- June 27 – Kathryn Beaumont, English actress and singer
- July 27 - Danielle De Metz, French actress
- July 29 - Enzo G. Castellari, Italian director, screenwriter and actor
- July 30 – Michael Bell, American actor
- August 6
  - Dion Anderson, American actor (died 2026)
  - Paul Bartel, American actor, writer and director (died 2000)
  - Peter Bonerz, American actor and director
- August 7 - Verna Bloom, American actress (died 2019)
- August 8 – Connie Stevens, American actress, singer
- August 9
  - Burton Gilliam, American actor
  - Michèle Girardon, French actress (died 1975)
- August 14 - James Fargo, American film director
- August 15
  - Ron Dean, American actor (died 2025)
  - Lucille Soong, Chinese-American actress
- August 19 – Diana Muldaur, American actress
- August 26 – Susan Harrison, American actress (died 2019)
- August 29 – Elliott Gould, American actor
- September 2
  - Clarence Felder, American actor
  - Giuliano Gemma, Italian actor (died 2013)
  - Mary Jo Catlett, American actress
- September 8 – Philip L. Clarke, American voice actor (died 2013)
- September 9 - Bill Raymond, American actor
  - September 12
  - Michael Leader, English actor (died 2016)
  - Anne Helm – Canadian actress
- September 17 - Paul Benedict, American actor (died 2008)
- September 26 – Jonathan Goldsmith, American character actor
- September 28 – Ben E. King, American soul singer (died 2015)
- October 1
  - Tunç Başaran, Turkish screenwriter, film director, film producer and actor (died 2019)
  - Tony Darrow, Italian-American actor
  - Stella Stevens, American actress (died 2023)
- October 2 – Rex Reed, American film critic and actor (died 2026)
- October 4 – Loretta Long, American actress, voice artist and singer
- October 10 – Steve Gordon, American filmmaker (died 1982)
- October 12 - Geoff Murphy, New Zealand filmmaker, producer, director and screenwriter (died 2018)
- October 13 – Christiane Hörbiger, Austrian actress (died 2022)
- October 18
  - Barbara Baldavin, American actress (died 2024)
  - Dawn Wells, American actress (died 2020)
- October 20 - Dolores Hart, American actress and nun
- October 22
  - Derek Jacobi, British actor
  - Christopher Lloyd, American actor
- October 27 - Lara Parker, American actress and writer (died 2023)
- October 30 – Ed Lauter, American actor and stand-up comedian (died 2013)
- November 13 – Jean Seberg, American actress (died 1979)
- November 20
  - Ardeshir Kazemi, Iranian actor
  - Dick Smothers, American actor, comedian, composer and musician
- November 26 – Rich Little, Canadian-American voice actor
- November 28 – Michael Ritchie, American director, producer and writer (died 2001)
- December 6 – Patrick Bauchau, Belgian actor
- December 12 - Leslie Schofield, English actor
- December 16
  - Neil Connery, Scottish actor (died 2021)
  - Liv Ullmann, Norwegian actress
- December 18 – Roger E. Mosley, American actor, director and writer (died 2022)
- December 21 – Larry Bryggman, American actor
- December 24 - Philippe Nahon, French actor (died 2020)
- December 26 - Bahram Beyzai, Iranian filmmaker (died 2025)
- December 28 - Frank Kelly, Irish actor (died 2016)
- December 29 – Jon Voight, American actor

== Deaths ==
- January 19 – Robert McWade, 65, American actor, The Kennel Murder Case, The Dragon Murder Case, Cappy Ricks Returns, Mr. Cinderella
- January 20 – Émile Cohl, 81, French film pioneer
- January 21 – Georges Méliès, 76, French film pioneer, The Impossible Voyage, A Trip to the Moon, The Merry Frolics of Satan, The Conquest of the Pole
- January 26 – Matthew Betz, 56, American actor, The Wedding March, The Patent Leather Kid, The Big House, The Hurricane Express
- July 14 – Abel Adams, 59, Finnish producer
- August 4 – Pearl White, 49, American silent film star, The Perils of Pauline, The Exploits of Elaine
- August 6 – Warner Oland, 58, Swedish-born actor, The Jazz Singer, Shanghai Express, Charlie Chan in London, Charlie Chan at the Opera
- September 19 – Pauline Frederick, 55, American stage & film actress, Thank You, Mr. Moto, Smouldering Fires, This Modern Age, Devil's Island
- October 1 – Conway Tearle, 60, American stage & film actor, The Hurricane Express, Romeo and Juliet, Stella Maris, The Lost Zeppelin
- December 25 – Harry Myers, 56, American film actor and director, City Lights, Baby
- December 28 – Florence Lawrence, 48, Canadian actress, Hollywood's first "star", Lady Helen's Escapade (suicide)

== Film debuts ==
- Ronald Adam – The Drum
- Dorothy Adams – Condemned Women
- Billy Curtis – The Terror of Tiny Town
- Gianni Agus – The Life of Giuseppe Verdi
- Eddie Albert – Brother Rat
- Jack Albertson – Next Time I Marry
- John Archer – Flaming Frontiers
- Vivian Austin – The Goldwyn Follies
- Griff Barnett – The Lone Ranger
- Yves Brainville – The Curtain Rises
- Rossano Brazzi – Il destino in tasca
- Paul Bryar – Professor Beware
- Richard Carlson – The Young in Heart
- Jean Claudio – Rasputin
- Hans Conried – Dramatic School
- Dora Doll – The Curtain Rises
- Peter Finch – Dad and Dave Come to Town
- Richard Fiske – Juvenile Court
- Bill Fraser – Murder in the Family
- John Garfield – Swingtime in the Movies
- David Gorcey – Little Tough Guy
- William Holden – Prison Farm
- Patrick Holt – The Challenge
- Bob Hope – The Big Broadcast of 1938
- Carl Jaffe – Second Best Bed
- Glynis Johns – South Riding
- Evelyn Keyes – The Buccaneer
- Harry Lauter – The Big Broadcast of 1938
- June Lockhart – A Christmas Carol
- Jeffrey Lynn – When Were You Born
- Patrick Macnee – Pygmalion
- Jerry Maren – The Terror of Tiny Town
- Roddy McDowall – John Halifax
- Shirley Mills – Child Bride
- Peggy Moran – Gold Diggers in Paris
- Reggie Nalder – Roxy and the Wonderteam
- Tom Neal – Out West with the Hardys
- James Nolan – Torchy Blane in Panama
- Arthur O'Connell – Freshman Year
- Maureen O'Hara – Kicking the Moon Around
- Emory Parnell – Arson Gang Busters
- Jon Pertwee – A Yank at Oxford
- Leslie Phillips – Lassie from Lancashire
- Hilda Plowright – Partners of the Plains
- Robert Preston – King of Alcatraz
- Vincent Price – Service de Luxe
- Lillian Randolph – Life Goes On
- Paula Raymond – Keep Smiling
- Colette Régis – Rasputin
- John Salew – George Takes the Air
- Walter Sande – The Goldwyn Follies
- Konstantin Shayne – Bulldog Drummond in Africa
- Red Skelton – Having Wonderful Time
- John Slater – Alf's Button Afloat
- Shepperd Strudwick – Fast Company
- Dub Taylor – You Can't Take It with You
- Walter Tetley – A Trip to Paris
- Victor Travers – You Can't Take It with You
- Rick Vallin – Freshman Year
- Charles Victor – The Return of the Frog
- Janet Waldo – Cocoanut Grove
- Cheryl Walker – Tip-Off Girls
- Richard Wattis – A Yank of Oxford
- Ilse Werner – Finale
