= Andy Hardy Meets Debutante =

1940 film by George B. Seitz

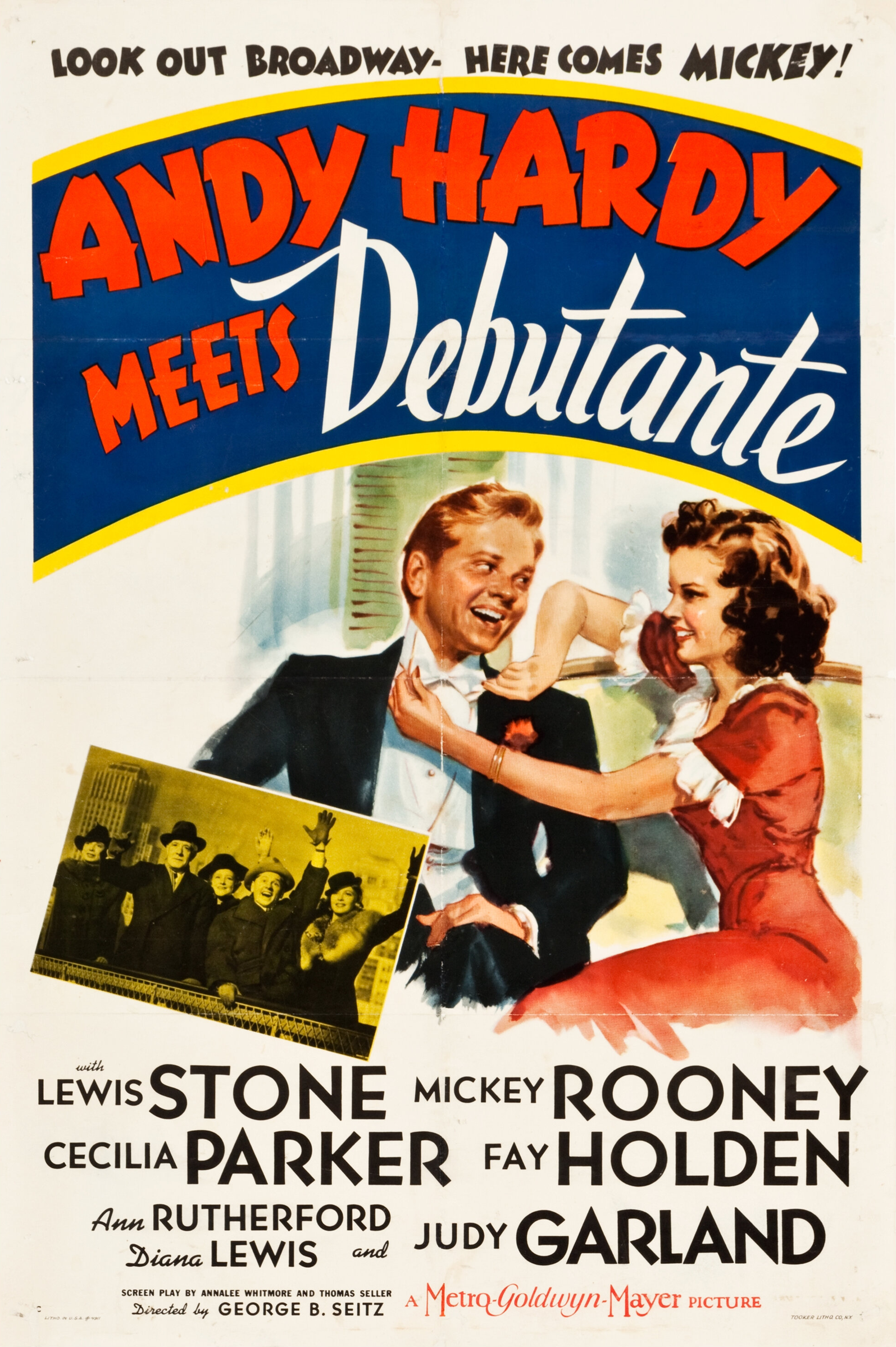
- Theatrical release poster
- Directed by: George B. Seitz
- Written by: Aurania Rouverol; Tom Seller; Annalee Whitmore
- Produced by: J.J. Cohn
- Starring: Lewis Stone; Mickey Rooney; Cecilia Parker; Fay Holden; Judy Garland
- Cinematography: Charles Lawton Jr. Sidney Wagner
- Edited by: Harold F. Kress
- Music by: Alex Hyde; David Snell
- Production company: Metro-Goldwyn-Mayer
- Distributed by: Loew's Inc.
- Release date: July 5, 1940
- Running time: 88 minutes
- Country: United States
- Language: English
- Budget: $436,000
- Box office: $2,623,000

Andy Hardy Meets Debutante is a 1940 American romantic comedy film directed by George B. Seitz. The film stars Lewis Stone, Mickey Rooney, Cecilia Parker, Fay Holden, and Judy Garland. It is the ninth of the Andy Hardy film series.

== Plot ==
Andy Hardy from Carvel becomes infatuated with well-known young socialite Daphne Fowler, from New York City. Although he has never met Daphne, he tells his friend "Beezy" and on-and-off girlfriend Polly Benedict that he and Daphne know each other well and hints that she has a romantic interest in him.

Andy's father, judge James K. Hardy, travels to New York with the whole family to work on a case involving an orphanage. The judge must appear in court against a law firm that is disputing payments from a trust fund that supports the orphanage. Polly and Beezy, editors of the monthly Carvel High School magazine, still don't believe Andy knows Daphne and tell him they plan to print a story about his relationship with Daphne, forcing him to pursue her to avoid embarrassment. In New York, Andy encounters old friend Betsy Booth, who has had a longtime crush on him. Andy remains oblivious to Betsy's feeling for him while he attempts to meet the popular and seemingly unattainable Daphne.

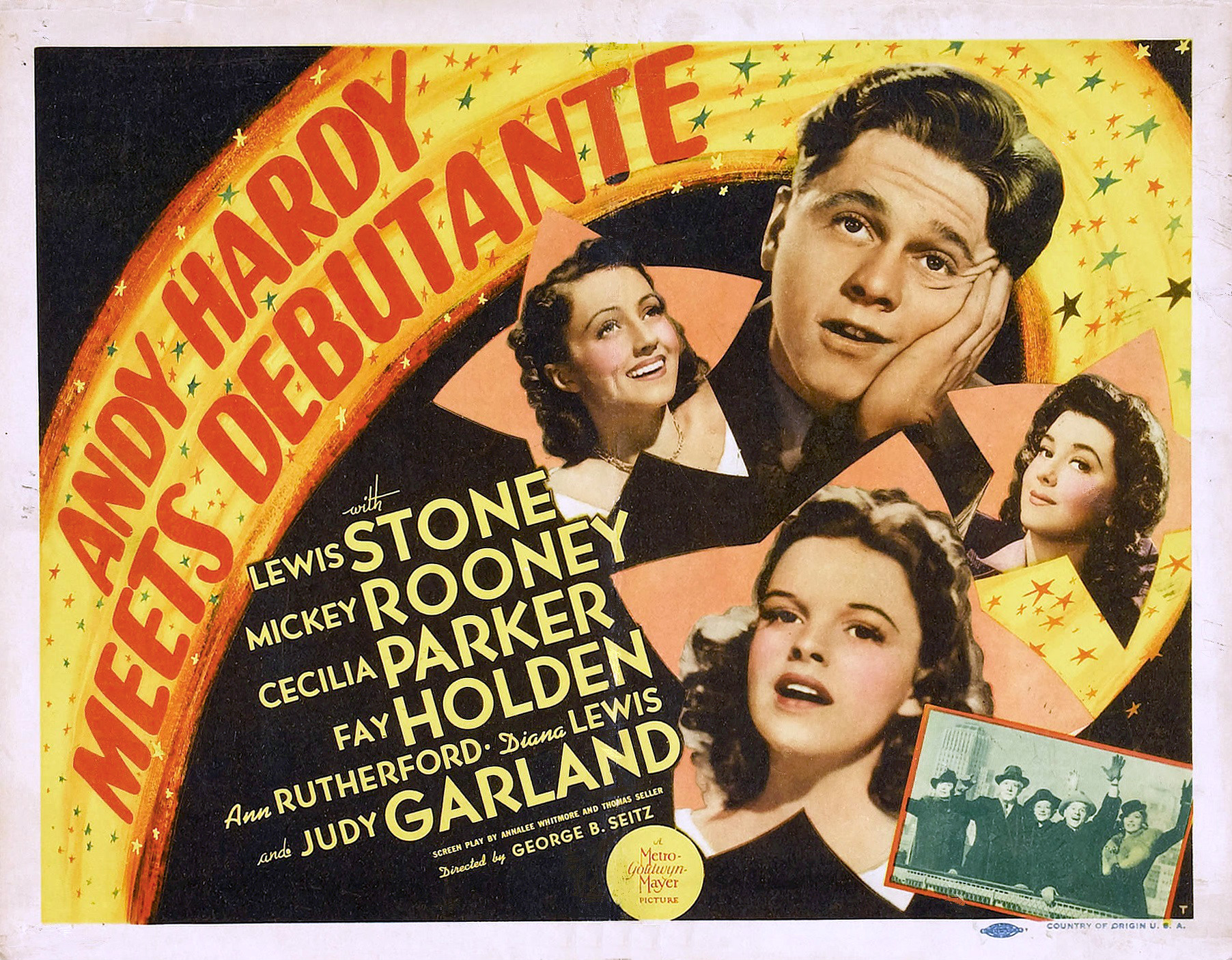
Lobby card

Andy attempts to hand deliver a letter to Daphne but is intercepted by her mother who politely dismisses him. Andy hears on the radio that Daphne is to attend a function at a posh restaurant. Betsy tries to warn him that the restaurant is quite expensive but Andy is certain that the $8 he has will be enough. He visits the restaurant to wait for Daphne, orders dinner and is incredulous when he discovers his bill for dinner is $37.25 (now equivalent to $865.40). After chastising Andy for putting on airs, the restaurant manager sends him away and declines to call the police.

Meanwhile, Judge Hardy wins the orphanage case. Andy is inspired by his father's successful litigation, and in a moment of honesty, he tells Betsy about his situation. Coincidentally, Betsy is a friend of Daphne and she immediately arranges for Andy to meet her.

Andy finds the high-society life too expensive and realizes his feelings for Betsy. They have their first kiss and they promise to write to each other regularly.

== Cast ==
- Mickey Rooney as Andy Hardy
- Judy Garland as Betsy Booth
- Lewis Stone as Judge James K. Hardy
- Cecilia Parker as Marian Hardy
- Fay Holden as Mrs. Emily Hardy
- Ann Rutherford as Polly Benedict
- Diana Lewis as Daphne Fowler
- George P. Breakston as F. Baker 'Beezy' Anderson
- Sara Haden as Aunt Milly Forrest
- Addison Richards as George Benedict
- George Lessey as Underwood, a Lawyer
- Cy Kendall as Mr. Carrillo
- Clyde Willson as Francis a.k.a. Butch

== Soundtracks ==
- Alone
  - Music by Nacio Herb Brown
  - Lyrics by Arthur Freed
  - Played on a record and sung by Judy Garland
- I'm Nobody's Baby
  - Written by Benny Davis, Milton Ager and Lester Santley
  - Sung by Judy Garland at the party

== Reception ==
In a contemporary review for The New York Times, critic Bosley Crowther wrote that the film is "... just another milestone in this popular family series—a milestone to be welcomed, that is. But we can't help speculating upon how much they all look alike."

According to MGM records, the film earned $1,945,000 in the U.S. and Canada and $678,000 elsewhere, resulting in a profit of $1,409,000.
