= Robert Baldwin (American actor) =

American film and stage actor

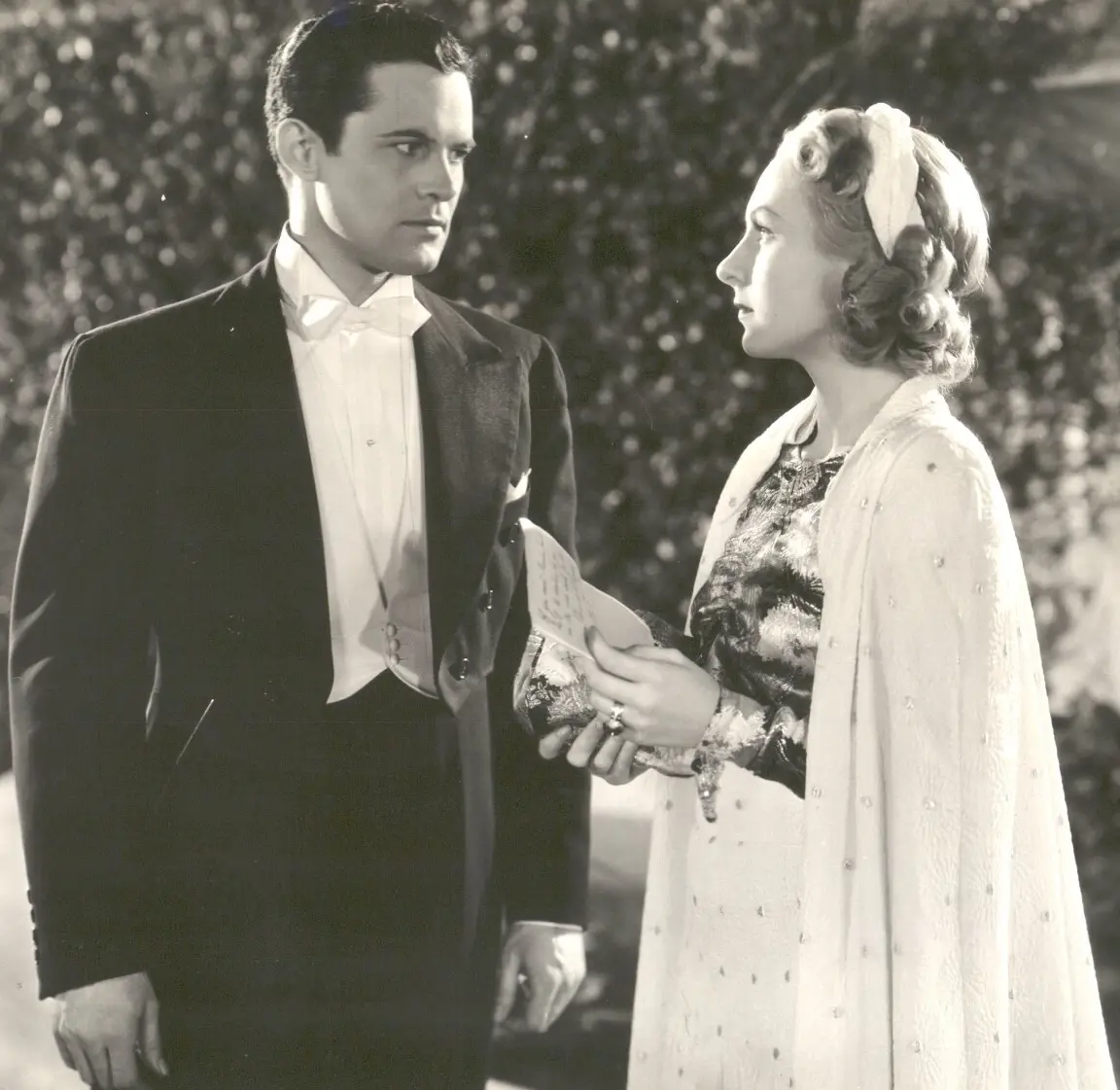
- Baldwin (left) with Karen Morley in The Girl from Scotland Yard, 1937
- Born: Robert Browning Baldwin; January 7, 1904; St. Louis, Missouri, U.S.
- Died: January 13, 1996 (aged 92); San Diego, California, U.S.
- Occupations: Film and stage actor
- Spouse: Cecilia Parker (m. 1938; died. 1993)

Robert Browning Baldwin (January 7, 1904 – January 13, 1996) was an American film and stage actor. He was best known for playing Roy Davis in the Dr. Christian film series.

== Life and career ==
Baldwin was born in St. Louis, Missouri. He originally wanted to become a dentist, but instead pursued acting. He began his stage career in 1926, appearing in the stage play Oh, Please!, and in 1931, he appeared in the stage play Ziegfeld Follies of 1931. He then began his screen career in 1936, appearing in the film Mind Your Own Business, and in 1937, he starred as Derrick Holt in the film The Girl from Scotland Yard, starring along with Karen Morley.

Later in his career, Baldwin played Dr. Roy Davis in four Dr. Christian films. In 1939, he starred as Tom Morris in the film Main Street Lawyer, starring along with Edward Ellis, Anita Louise, Harold Huber and Margaret Hamilton. In 1940, he starred as James Rutherford Jr. in the film Village Barn Dance, starring along with Richard Cromwell, Doris Day, George Barbier, Esther Dale and Andrew Tombes. He appeared in films such as Midnight Madonna, Caught in the Act, Dragonwyck and Gambling Daughters.

Baldwin retired from acting in 1964, last appearing in the Flipper's New Adventure. Aside from acting, he worked as a real estate broker in Ventura, California.

== Death ==
Baldwin died on January 23, 1996, at his daughter's home in San Diego, California, at the age of 92.
