= Gambling Daughters =

1941 film by Max Nosseck

- Directed by: Max Nosseck
- Written by: Sidney Sheldon; Ben Roberts; Joel Kay; Arnold Lippschitz
- Produced by: Ted Richmond; Melville Shyer
- Starring: Cecilia Parker; Roger Pryor; Robert Baldwin
- Cinematography: Mack Stengler
- Music by: Robert Katscher
- Production company: Producers Releasing Corporation
- Distributed by: Producers Releasing Corporation
- Release date: August 1, 1941
- Running time: 67 minutes
- Country: United States
- Language: English

Gambling Daughters is a 1941 American mystery film directed by Max Nosseck and starring Cecilia Parker, Roger Pryor and Robert Baldwin.

== Plot ==
Lillian and Katherine discover a gambling spot while following their French teacher, then Lillian falls for Chance, the manager working there. The girls are induced to play on credit, and after a couple of weeks and a couple of thousand dollars in debt, they are forced to steal jewellery from their families.

== Cast ==
- Cecilia Parker as Diana Cameron
- Roger Pryor as Chance Landon
- Robert Baldwin as Jimmy Parker
- Gale Storm as Lillian Harding
- Sig Arno as Prof. Bedoin
- Janet Shaw as Katherine Thompson
- Charles Miller as Walter Cameron
- Eddie Foster as Nick
- Alfred Hall as Dean
- Judy Kilgore as Gloria
- Gertrude Messinger as Jane
- Marvelle Andre as Dorothy
- Roberta Smith as Mary

== Bibliography ==
- Langman, Larry. Destination Hollywood: The Influence of Europeans on American Filmmaking. McFarland, 2000.
