= The Girl from Scotland Yard =

1937 film by Robert G. Vignola

- Directed by: Robert G. Vignola
- Screenplay by: Doris Anderson; Dore Schary; Story by: Coningsby Dawson
- Starring: Karen Morley; Robert Baldwin; Eduardo Ciannelli; Katharine Alexander; Lloyd Crane; Bud Flanagan; Lynn Anders; Odette Myrtil; Claude King; Leonid Kinskey
- Cinematography: Robert Pittack
- Edited by: George McGuire
- Music by: Georgie Stoll
- Production company: Paramount Pictures
- Distributed by: Paramount Pictures
- Release date: April 9, 1937
- Running time: 61 minutes
- Country: United States
- Language: English

The Girl from Scotland Yard is a 1937 American mystery crime film directed by Robert G. Vignola and starring Karen Morley.

Actor Jon Hall appears under the name "Lloyd Crane".

== Plot ==
Detective Beech (Karen Morley) and reporter Holt (Robert Baldwin) pursue a death ray–wielding anarchist (Eduardo Cianelli) with a pathological hatred of England.

== Cast ==
- Karen Morley as Linda Beech
- Robert Baldwin as Derrick Holt
- Eduardo Ciannelli as Franz Jorg
- Katharine Alexander as Lady Lavering
- Lloyd Crane as Bertie
- Dennis O'Keefe as John
- Milli Monti as herself
- Lynn Anders as Mary Smith
- Richard Ted Adams as valet
- Odette Myrtilas Mme Dupré
- Claude King as Sir Eric Ledyard
- Leonid Kinskey as Mischa

== Critical reception ==
Leonard Maltin wrote, "escapist story of girl trying to track down mysterious madman with destruction ray is poorly handled; not nearly as much fun as it might have been." and Fantastic Movie Musings & Ramblings wrote, "there are nice touches here and there...but all in all, it's merely rather ordinary. Not bad for a slow day and keep your expectations in check."
