= Rainbow Ranch =

- Theatrical release poster
- Directed by: Harry L. Fraser
- Screenplay by: Harry L. Fraser; Phil Dunham
- Produced by: Paul Malvern
- Starring: Rex Bell; Cecilia Parker; Bob Kortman; Harry Bowen; Henry Hall; Vane Calvert
- Cinematography: Archie Stout
- Edited by: Carl Pierson
- Production company: Monogram Pictures
- Distributed by: Monogram Pictures
- Release date: July 25, 1933
- Running time: 55 minutes
- Country: United States
- Language: English

Rainbow Ranch is a 1933 American Western film directed by Harry L. Fraser and written by Harry L. Fraser and Phil Dunham. The film stars Rex Bell, Cecilia Parker, Bob Kortman, Harry Bowen, Henry Hall and Vane Calvert. The film was released on July 25, 1933, by Monogram Pictures.

== Cast ==
- Rex Bell as Ed Randall
- Cecilia Parker as Molly Burke
- Bob Kortman as Marvin Black
- Harry Bowen as Train Passenger
- Henry Hall as Judge
- Vane Calvert as Martha Randall
- Gordon De Main as Sheriff
- Charles Haefeli as Johnny
- George Nash as Pete
- Jerome Storm as Sam
- Tiny Sandford as Joe
