= Mata Hari (1931 film) =

1931 American drama film

- Directed by: George Fitzmaurice
- Written by: Benjamin Glazer; Leo Birinsky; Doris Anderson; Gilbert Emery
- Produced by: George Fitzmaurice; Irving Thalberg
- Starring: Greta Garbo; Ramon Novarro; Lewis Stone; Lionel Barrymore
- Cinematography: William Daniels
- Edited by: Frank Sullivan
- Music by: William Axt (uncredited)
- Production company: Metro-Goldwyn-Mayer
- Distributed by: Loew's Inc.
- Release date: December 26, 1931
- Running time: 92 minutes
- Country: United States
- Language: English
- Budget: $558,000
- Box office: $2,227,000 (worldwide rental)

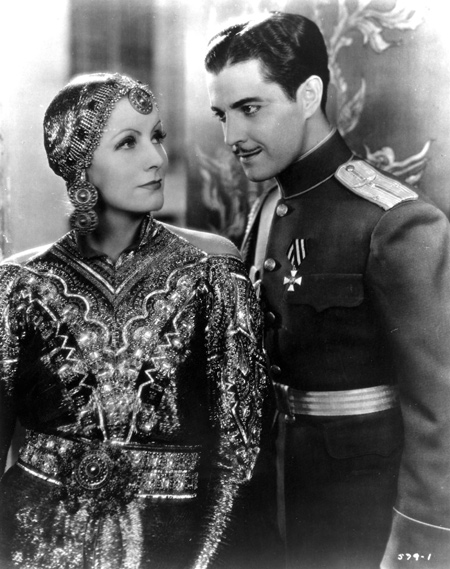
Greta Garbo and Ramon Novarro

Mata Hari is a 1931 American pre-Code drama film directed by George Fitzmaurice loosely based on the life of Mata Hari, an exotic dancer and courtesan executed for espionage during World War I. The Metro-Goldwyn-Mayer film stars Greta Garbo in the title role. It was Garbo's most commercially successful vehicle. Only a censored version of the film is currently available.

== Plot ==
In 1917, France is embroiled in World War I. Dubois, head of the French spy bureau, offers to spare the life of a captured agent if he will reveal who he is protecting. Dubois suspects it is Mata Hari, a celebrated exotic dancer, but the prisoner chooses execution by firing squad.

Lieutenant Alexis Rosanoff of the Imperial Russian Air Force lands in Paris after a dangerous flight over enemy territory, bringing important dispatches from Russia. He persuades his superior, General Serge Shubin, to take him to see Mata Hari perform that night.

Rosanoff is instantly smitten by her (as are most of the men of Paris). By youthful exuberance and good looks, he persuades her to spend the night with him. However, the next morning, she makes it clear to him that it was a one-time dalliance.

Carlotta secretly instructs Mata Hari to report to Andriani, their spymaster. Andriani orders her to find out from General Shubin the contents of the dispatches Rosanoff brought.

Meanwhile, when Dubois discloses his suspicions about Mata Hari to Shubin, the general laughs them off as ridiculous. However, Shubin has himself passed secret information to his lover Mata Hari, whom he is expecting for a private dinner. Rosanoff arrives unexpectedly, in case Shubin has further instructions before the pilot returns to Russia with more important dispatches. Upon learning of Rosanoff's mission, Mata Hari arranges for a confederate to steal the dispatches, photograph them and then return them undetected, while she keeps a puzzled, but delighted Rosanoff occupied.

This is the opportunity for which Dubois has been waiting. He informs Shubin of Mata Hari's recent activities, inciting his jealousy. She comes to see the general, but is unable to persuade him she was only doing her job. In fact, she has fallen in love with the younger man. Furious, Shubin telephones Dubois and confirms that Mata Hari is a spy. She shoots him dead before he can carry through on his threat to implicate Rosanoff.

Mata Hari goes into hiding, but when Andriani informs her that Rosanoff crashed and was seriously injured on his way back to Russia, she defies him and resigns to go to her love. Rosanoff has been blinded, but may recover his sight. After a joyful reunion (in which she does not reveal her desperate predicament), she is arrested by Dubois.

At her trial, her lawyer, Major Caron, points out that Dubois' case is weak; all his testimony is second-hand. However, when Dubois threatens to have Rosanoff brought in to testify that he met her outside Shubin's office just after the murder, Mata Hari gives up. She is sentenced to death. She writes to Rosanoff, telling him that she cannot see him for a while, as she has to go to a sanatorium for her health.

Shortly before her execution, Rosanoff is brought to her. The jailor and the attending nuns all maintain the pretense that they are in a sanatorium. Rosanoff tells the prisoner that he will likely see again and he looks forward to their future life together once she has recovered her health. Finally, Mata Hari is taken away to face the firing squad, with Rosanoff under the impression that she is going into surgery for a routine operation.

== Cast ==
- Greta Garbo as Mata Hari
- Ramon Novarro as Lieutenant Alexis Rosanoff
- Lionel Barrymore as General Serge Shubin
- Lewis Stone as Andriani
- C. Henry Gordon as Dubois
- Karen Morley as Carlotta
- Alec B. Francis as Major Caron
- Blanche Friderici as Sister Angelica (as Blanche Frederici)
- Edmund Breese as Warden
- Helen Jerome Eddy as Sister Genevieve
- Frank Reicher as The Cook-Spy, ordered by Andriani to commit suicide for his past failures

== Reception ==
=== Critical ===
In a contemporary review, Mordaunt Hall of the The New York Times described the film as a "beautifully staged and ably directed production", in which "the alluring Greta Garbo delivers another brilliant portrayal." He commended the director, George Fitzmaurice for conveying the "story in an intelligent and restrained fashion" and praised the performances of Novarro and Barrymore.

Variety wrote that the story is "nothing sensational" and "can't stand up alone", and that the effectiveness of the film was due to the performances of Greta Garbo, described as "sexy and hot in a less subtle way", Ramon Novarro, Lionel Barrymore and Lewis Stone.

The Film Daily described the film as a "World War spy drama that can't miss", and wrote, "Enhanced by such names as Garbo, Barrymore, Stone and Novarro this picture affords something genuine for the marquee lights. It suffers somewhat from a slightly old-fashioned treatment, dialogue which is not particularly original and a tendency to move slow at times, but nevertheless, it's entertainment."

International Photographer called the film "drama in its sternest mood" with "few smiles and no laughs," but gave the film an excellent review.

=== Commercial ===
Commercially, Mata Hari was Garbo's most successful film, netting a profit of $879,000. The film grossed $931,000 in the United States and $1,296,000 elsewhere. These combined grosses amounted to $2,227,000 (or $40,474,668 in 2018 dollars).

== Censorship upon reissue ==
As with many pre-Code Hollywood films, Mata Hari was censored upon its reissue after strict enforcement of the Hays Code began in mid-1934.

- Mata's erotic dance to the statue of Shiva was drastically shortened. At the end of what remains, a glimpse of Mata (played in long shots by a dance double) almost completely nude and slumped motionless at the feet of the statue was left in, evidence now of how much was cut out. A brief fragment of the deleted portion of her dance of the veils survives at the end of a pre-Code trailer.
- In Rosanoff's first visit to Mata's apartment, the fade-out that ends the scene was moved up, eliminating views of Mata after she changes into a see-through negligee, more love-making, and the clear implication of a consummation after the fade-out.
- In Mata's visit to Rosanoff's apartment, after he blows out the candle he was shown carrying Mata off to his bedroom. As part of the following sequence showing the removal, copying and return of the secret documents, there was a scene of the pair in bed, engaged in pillow talk, discreetly lit only by the glowing ends of their cigarettes — a once-famous scene the censors removed completely. One line of dialog from that now-missing minute, in which Rosanoff comments on Mata's "ridiculously long" eyelashes, is referred to later in the film.

According to online reports, not officially confirmed but for more than ten years apparently never contradicted, a print of the original uncut version, subtitled in French and Dutch, survives at the Cinémathèque Royale de Belgique in Brussels, where it was publicly shown in 2005. That institution's program guide for March 2009 documents a showing of Mata Hari with a stated running time of 92 minutes. The censored version released on DVD in 2005 has a running time of 89 minutes.

== See also ==
- Mata Hari (1927)
- Mata Hari, Agent H21 (1964)
- Mata Hari (1985)
- Spy film
