= Love Finds Andy Hardy =

1938 film by George B. Seitz

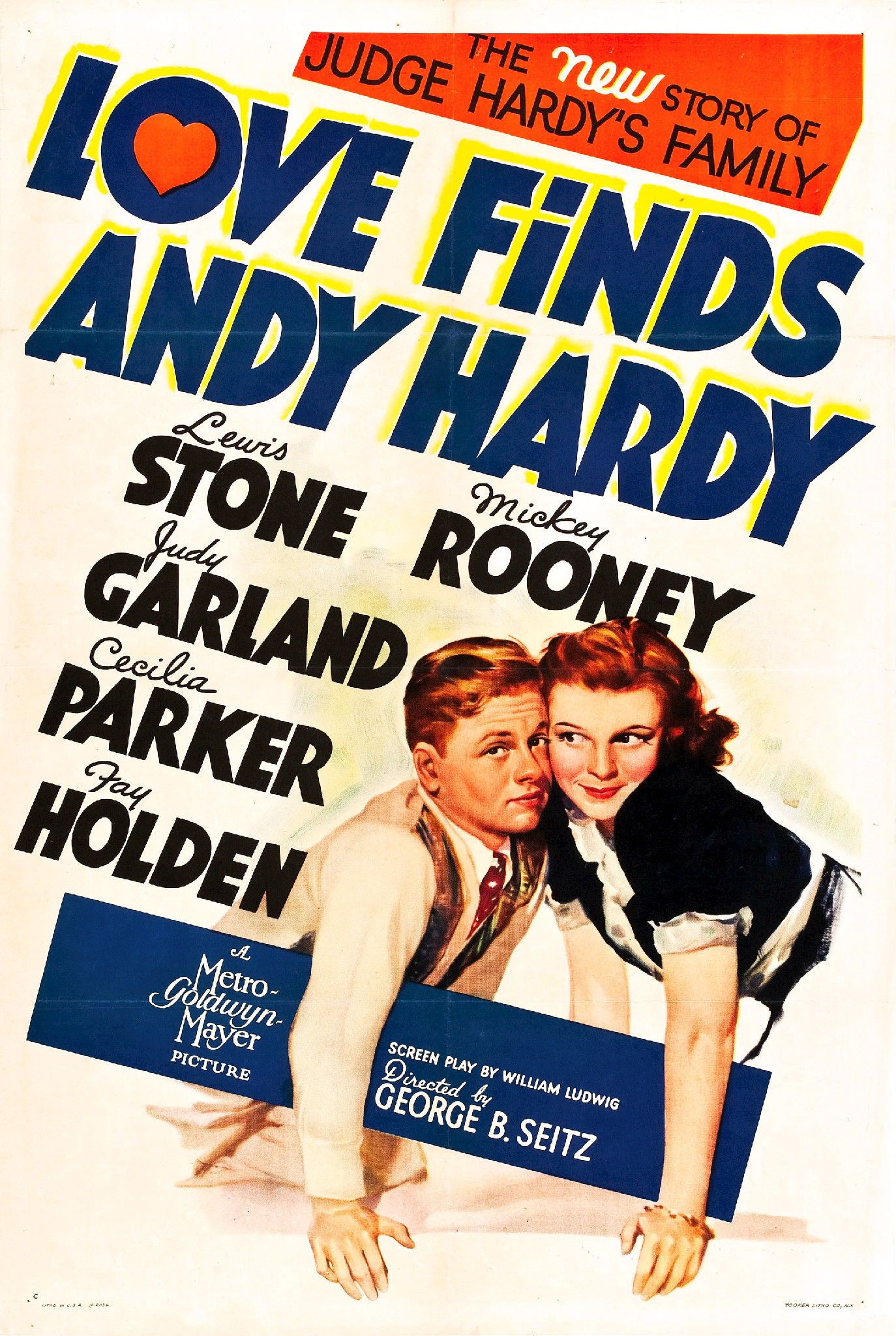
- 1938 theatrical poster
- Directed by: George B. Seitz
- Written by: Vivien R. Bretherton; William Ludwig; Aurania Rouverol
- Produced by: Lou L. Ostrow; Carey Wilson
- Starring: Lewis Stone; Mickey Rooney; Judy Garland; Cecilia Parker; Fay Holden
- Cinematography: Lester White
- Edited by: Ben Lewis
- Music by: David Snell
- Production company: Metro-Goldwyn-Mayer
- Distributed by: Loew's Inc.
- Release date: July 22, 1938
- Running time: 91 minutes
- Country: United States
- Language: English
- Budget: $212,000
- Box office: $2,247,000

Love Finds Andy Hardy is a 1938 American romantic comedy film directed by George B. Seitz and produced by Metro-Goldwyn-Mayer. It stars Lewis Stone, Mickey Rooney, Judy Garland, Cecilia Parker, and Fay Holden, with Lana Turner, Ann Rutherford, Mary Howard and Gene Reynolds in supporting roles. The story follows teenager Andy Hardy, who becomes entangled with three different girls at once.

The screenplay was written by William Ludwig, from stories by Vivien R. Bretherton, and based upon characters created by Aurania Rouverol. It was the first film in which MGM recorded at least part of the soundtrack in stereophonic sound, a practice which was used for a number of the studio's musical comedies beginning the late 1930s. The film was presented in standard monaural sound.

Love Finds Andy Hardy was released on July 22, 1938, and was distributed by Loew's Inc. The film was commercially successful and grossed over $2.2 million at the box office. In 2000, the film was selected for preservation in the United States National Film Registry by the Library of Congress as being "culturally, historically, or aesthetically significant".

== Plot ==
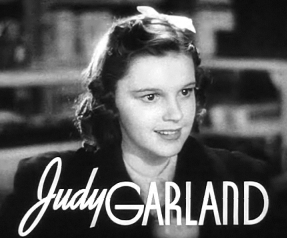
Judy Garland in the trailer for the film.

In December 1938, Andy Hardy is putting a down payment on a used car, desperate to take his girlfriend Polly Benedict to the Christmas Eve dance in his own car. When Polly tells Andy she will be visiting her grandmother for the next three weeks and will not be able to attend the dance with him, Andy vows to go alone. Judge Hardy, Andy's father, later encounters his son and tells him that he cannot have his own car.

Returning home for the evening, Judge Hardy runs into 12-year-old Betsy Booth, who is staying with her grandparents for the Christmas holiday. Betsy's grandmother has been effusive about Andy, and Betsy is thrilled to learn he will be her neighbor during her stay. Meanwhile, Judge Hardy's wife Emily learns by telegram that her mother has had a stroke, and leaves immediately for Canada to care for her. Andy meets Betsy while delivering some of his mother's canned preserves. Betsy is taken with Andy, but he does not reciprocate her admiration and leaves quickly.

Beezy, Andy's friend, asks Andy to date Cynthia, Beezy's girlfriend, while Beezy is out of town over the holiday period, so that she will avoid other men. Andy agrees after Beezy promises to pay him for his efforts. Andy starts going out with Cynthia, but she is bored by sports activities, and they find they only get along when they kiss. After walking Cynthia home, Andy stops in to visit Betsy, who gives him a new radiator cap for his car, but sadly notices he is still covered in Cynthia's lipstick.

One morning, Andy receives a telegram from Polly, saying she will be home for the Christmas Eve dance after all. Andy telephones her saying he can't take her to the dance because of a previous engagement. He thereafter opens a letter from Beezy, writing that he found a new girlfriend and will not pay Andy for dating Cynthia. Betsy offers to help Andy pay for his car, but he refuses her aid. That evening, Andy tells his father about the mess he made. Judge Hardy explains his perspective about spending money on a car versus putting it aside as savings—and then discloses his deep concern for Andy's mother. Judge Hardy would like to convey a message to his wife, but there is no telephone at her mother's home and Emily finds telegrams unnerving.

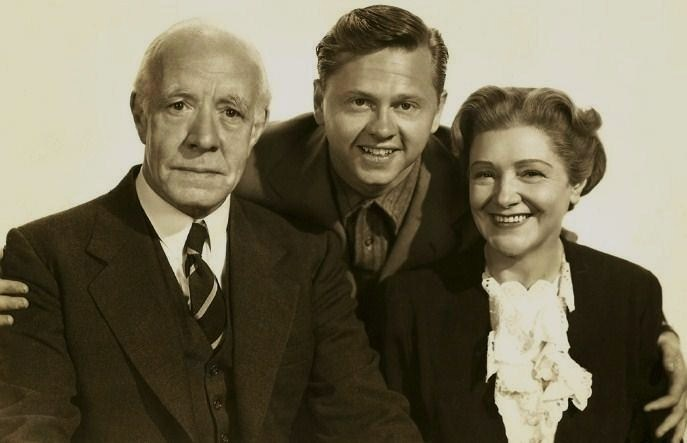
Lewis Stone, Mickey Rooney, and Fay Holden

Andy suggests a message be sent to their mother via ham radio. Andy brings Judge Hardy to the home of twelve-year-old ham radio operator James McMann Jr., who sends a message to Mrs. Hardy in Brigham, Quebec. Impressed with James's help and Andy's ingenuity, Judge Hardy pays the last amount for Andy's car.

Betsy deceives Cynthia into thinking that Andy's car is an absolute wreck; Cynthia haughtily refuses to go to the Christmas Eve dance with Andy. Andy feels relieved to be able to date Polly again. Andy tries to clear things up with Polly but, having learned of his affair with Cynthia, she angrily refuses to go to the dance with him, claiming she has a date with a college boy. Initially, Andy is dejected at the prospect of not having a date for the dance, but when Betsy comes over, he decides to take her instead.

At the dance, Polly's date recognizes Betsy as an accomplished singer and asks her to perform; she proves to be a fantastic singer and quickly wins over the crowd. Betsy and Andy lead the dance in a grand march after Polly leaves in tears. Late that evening at home after the dance, Betsy and the Hardy family are gathered together around the Christmas tree when Mrs. Hardy unexpectedly returns home, as her mother is getting better.

On Christmas Day, Betsy explains everything to Polly. Polly and her date from the dance come over to the Hardy home, and Polly's date turns out to be her cousin. Polly's cousin then meets Andy's sister, and they leave together. Betsy expresses her gratitude to Andy for a wonderful evening and leaves. Polly and Andy reconcile.

== Cast ==
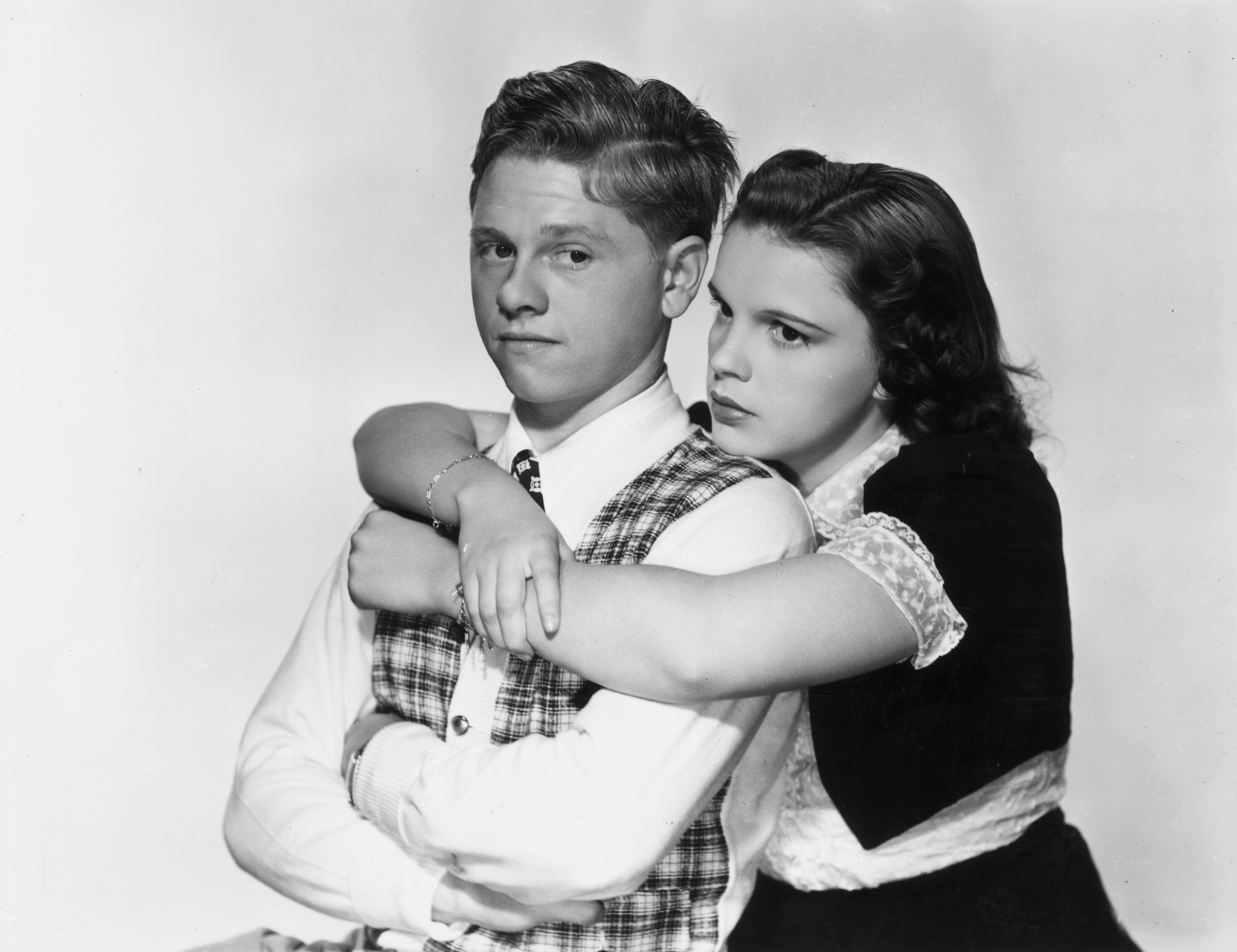
Rooney with Judy Garland in a still from the film

- Mickey Rooney as Andy Hardy
- Lewis Stone as Judge James K. Hardy
- Fay Holden as Mrs. Emily Hardy
- Cecilia Parker as Marian Hardy
- Judy Garland as Betsy Booth
- Lana Turner as Cynthia Potter
- Ann Rutherford as Polly Benedict
- Mary Howard as Mrs. Mary Tompkins
- Gene Reynolds as James 'Jimmy' MacMahon Jr.
- Don Castle as Dennis Hunt
- Betty Ross Clarke as Aunt Millie Forrest
- Marie Blake as Augusta, the Cook
- George Breakston as Francis Bacon 'Beezy' Anderson
- Raymond Hatton as Peter Dugan
- Frank Darien as Mr. Barnes, Bill Collector

== Production ==
Production of Love Finds Andy Hardy took place at MGM from mid-May to mid-June 1938. The film placed ninth in Film Daily's annual poll of the top films of 1938. Mickey Rooney began to receive "star billing" in subsequent films due to his success in the film, which he worked on simultaneously with Boys Town, released the same year.

== Reception ==
=== Critical ===
Picturegoer’s Lionel Collier wrote that the film was an example of the "simple, unsophisticated stories" that were "finding favour again." He commented on the performances, writing, "Lewis Stone is dignified, and natural, and Fay Holden pleasing as his wife. Most of the limelight is held by Mickey Rooney, who, in spite of prodigious mugging, succeeds in being really funny. He once said that he wanted to be another Wallace Beery; in his acting here he seems to be laying the foundation for it. The girls in question are neatly played by Judy Garland, who also sings swing music, with all the necessary vociferation required for that form of vocal exercise, Lana Turner and Ann Rutherford."

Film critic Pauline Kael praised Love Finds Andy Hardy in her book 5001 Nights At The Movies (p. 438): “Immensely entertaining. The fourth and perhaps the most charming of the Andy Hardy series, Louis B. Mayer’s make-believe vision of Middle America.”

=== Box office ===
Love Finds Andy Hardy was a commercial success, earning $1,637,000 in the US and Canada and $610,000 elsewhere, resulting in a profit of $1,345,000.
