= Oh, Please! =

1926 musical by Vincent Youmans

Oh, Please! is a musical in two acts with music by Vincent Youmans and a libretto co-authored by Anne Caldwell and Otto Harbach that was based on the French play La Présidente (1912) by Maurice Hennequin and Pierre Veber. It premiered on Broadway at the Fulton Theatre on December 17, 1926. It ran there for a total of 75 performances; closing on February 26, 1927. It was produced by Charles Dillingham, staged by Hassard Short, and choreographed by David Bennett. The costumes and sets were designed by James Reynolds. One of the show's more successful songs was "I Know That You Know".

The cast included Beatrice Lillie as Lily Valli, Charles Purcell as Robert Vandeleur, Charles Winninger as Nicodemus Bliss, Helen Broderick as Emma Bliss, Charles Angle as Billy Lan, Robert Baldwin as Peter Perkins, Richard Bennett as Sammy Sands, Dorothie Bigelow as Marjorie Kenyon, Leon Canova as Chester Case, Kitty Kelly as Fay Follette, Gertrude McDonald as Thelma Tiffany, Lloyd Carder as Dick Mason, Cynthia MacVae as Clarice Cartier, Nick Long as Jack Gates, Irma Irving as Jane Jones, Dolores Farris as Ruth King, Charles Columbus as Buddy Trescott, James Garrett as Ted Foster, Josephine Sabel as Miss Walla Walla, Pearl Hight as Miss Fall River, Blanche Latell as Miss South Bend, Jack Wilson as Joe Dillard, and Gertrude Clemens as Miss Topeka.
