= Andy Hardy Comes Home =

1958 film

- Directed by: Howard W. Koch
- Written by: Edward Everett Hutshing; Robert Morris Donley additional dialogue Harry Ruskin
- Based on: characters created by Aurania Rouverol
- Produced by: Red Doff
- Starring: Mickey Rooney; Patricia Breslin; Fay Holden
- Cinematography: William W. Spencer; Harold E. Wellman
- Edited by: John Baxter Rogers
- Music by: Van Alexander
- Production company: Fryman Enterprises
- Distributed by: Metro-Goldwyn-Mayer
- Release date: December 22, 1958
- Running time: 80 minutes
- Country: United States
- Language: English
- Budget: $313,000
- Box office: $610,000

Andy Hardy Comes Home is a 1958 American comedy film directed by Howard W. Koch. It is the 16th and final film in the Andy Hardy series, with Mickey Rooney reprising his signature role. It was produced 12 years after the previous Hardy film, and was an attempt to revive what had once been an enormously popular film series. The film was a commercial failure, so Metro-Goldwyn-Mayer did not continue the series.

== Plot ==
Andrew "Andy" Hardy, now a corporate lawyer working for an airplane manufacturer in California, returns to his hometown of Carvel on behalf of his employer to buy property for an electronics components factory.

Upon his arrival, he reminiscences about his youth in the town via flashbacks to earlier films. He also reconnects with his mother, aunt, sister, and nephew Jimmy as he attempts to buy land for the factory. He initially cuts a deal with a local landowner, Thomas Chandler, but the deal falls apart when Chandler reneges on their deal and tries to double the price.

With his job in jeopardy, Andy's old friend Beezy agrees to sell him property he owns. But Chandler vindictively starts a campaign to rezone Beezy's property to stop the factory. Beezy, after initially holding firm, is pressured not to sell. A petition drive commences to stop the factory.

Andy brings his wife and two children to the town for moral support. He pleads his case at a town meeting at which the entire town is against him. He leaves before a decision is made. The following morning, the town assembles at his house just before he is about to go back to California in disgrace. The mayor tells Andy that the town council, convinced by his plea, voted unanimously against rezoning, and offers him a job as judge.

The film ends with Andy on the bench as a judge, and wording on the screen "to be continued. . ."

== Cast ==
- Mickey Rooney as Andy Hardy
- Patricia Breslin as Jane Hardy
- Fay Holden as Mrs. Emily Hardy
- Cecilia Parker as Marian
- Sara Haden as Aunt Milly Forrest
- Joey Forman as Beezy "Beez" Anderson
- Jerry Colonna as Doc
- Vaughn Taylor as Thomas Chandler
- Frank Ferguson as Mayor Benson
- William Leslie as Jack Bailey
- Tom Duggan as Councilman Warren
- Jeanne Baird as Sally Anderson
- Gina Gillespie as Cricket Hardy
- Jimmy Bates as Chuck
- Teddy Rooney as Andrew "Andy" Hardy, Jr.
- Johnny Weissmuller, Jr. as Jimmy
- Pat Cawley as Betty Wilson

== Production ==
Songwriter Robert Donley and journalist Edward Hushting wrote an original Andy Hardy synopsis on speculation and brought it to Rooney's agent, Red Doff. He showed it to Rooney, who was enthusiastic, and they pitched the project to Metro-Goldwyn-Mayer as a co-production with Rooney's own company, Fryman Enterprises. The studio, then under the control of Joseph Vogel, agreed to make the film.

"We feel it's time for another Hardy picture", said Doff. "Time for a good, warm, wholesome family comedy – no violence, no monsters, no sex! There are millions who have seen and loved the Hardys – and who would like to see them again. And there are millions who never saw them on the big screen, but who are being presold by seeing them on TV. People like things nostalgic. We believe they'll be curious to see a re-creation of what they loved 15 and 20 years ago."

Lewis Stone, who had played the beloved Judge James Hardy in the previous films, had died in 1953 and his character's passing was portrayed in the film. Fay Holden, Sara Haden, and Cecilia Parker all reprised their roles of Emily Hardy, Aunt Milly and his sister Marian, respectively. (Parker had mostly retired from acting since the previous film in 1947, devoting herself to raising her children). Marian is shown as having a teenaged son, Jimmy, but her husband is not mentioned.

Mickey Rooney tried to persuade Ann Rutherford to return as Polly Benedict, Andy's on-and-off sweetheart in most of the original movies, so the two characters could be a married couple, but Rutherford's salary demands were too high, and the character was written out. (In a 1972 interview Rutherford stated that when she read the script she felt that it "just didn't work" and she had to make up an excuse to get out of making the new film.) Andy's wife in the film, Jane (played by Patricia Breslin), had no prior connection to the town of Carvel.

The flashback with Judy Garland was taken from the 1939 musical Babes in Arms, which was not part of the Andy Hardy series, with the name "Betsy Booth" dubbed in. That was the character's name in the Andy Hardy series but not the musical.

In line with MGM's practice of introducing studio contract players in the series, contractee Pat Cawley was given a role.

The role of Andy Hardy Jr. was played by Rooney's real-life son with Martha Vickers, Teddy.

Filming began on May 7, 1958. The film premiered on December 22, 1958, in New York City.

== Reception ==
Los Angeles Times critic Philip K. Scheuer called the film "a nice slice of nostalgia for the older folks and should have curiosity value among the younger ones."

According to MGM records, the movie earned $400,000 in the US and Canada and $210,000 elsewhere, making a loss to the studio of $5,000.

Before the film was released, Hutshing and Donley worked on a sequel about Andy Hardy as a judge called Andy Hardy Carries On. There was also some talk of an Andy Hardy TV series. In the early 1960s, a pilot was shot for a prospective Andy Hardy sitcom for NBC, with a totally different cast and with the character of Judge Hardy returning, but NBC did not pick it up as a series.

In his 2016 book "The Essential Mickey Rooney," film historian James L. Neibaur writes that the film was a "box office flop that lost money for the studio," so plans to resume the Hardy series were abandoned. Rooney wrote in his autobiography that "The public simply didn't care what had happened to Andy Hardy."

Neibaur writes that Rooney worked hard to capture the charm of the original series, but "after the novelty of seeing everyone back in their familiar roles has worn off, we are left with a dull feature." While some efforts to capture the character's maturity worked, Neibaur observes that efforts to contrast Andy Hardy with contemporary teenagers failed. Neibaur opines that the film was hampered by lacking an explanation of what had transpired in the years since the series.

== See also ==
- List of American films of 1958
