= List of Egyptian films of 1938 =

A list of films produced in Egypt in 1938. For an A-Z list of films currently on Wikipedia, see Category:Egyptian films.

Title	Director	Cast	Genre	Notes
Lasheen	Fritz Kramp	Hassan Ezzat, Nadia Nagi, Hussein Riad	Drama, Romance	
Yahya el hub	Mohammed Karim	Mohammed Abdel Wahab, Leila Mourad	Drama, Romance	
