= Karen Morley =

American actress (1909–2003)

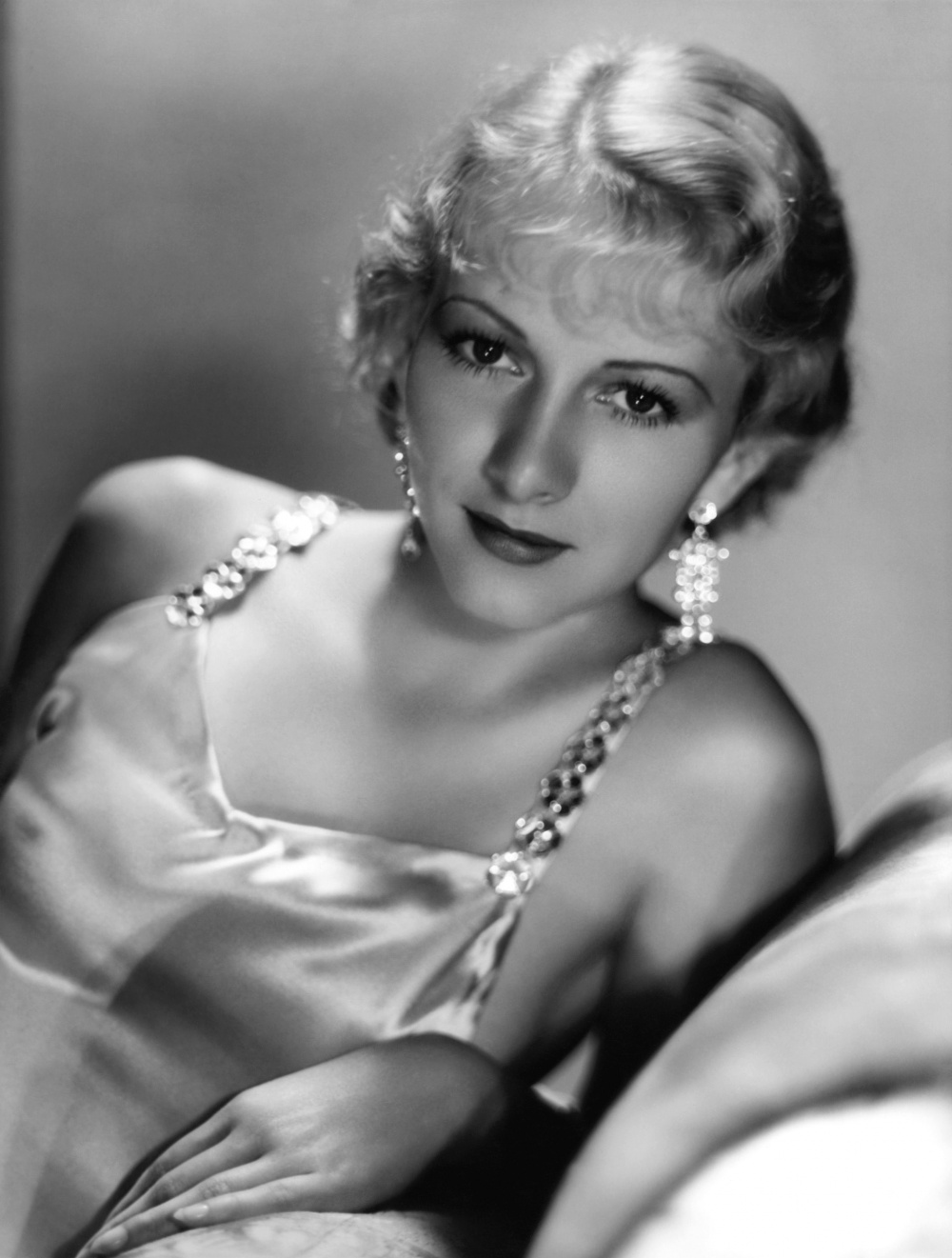
- Promotional photograph of Morley in 1930s
- Born: Mildred Linton; December 12, 1909; Ottumwa, Iowa, U.S.
- Died: March 8, 2003 (aged 93); Woodland Hills, Los Angeles, California, U.S.
- Education: Hollywood High School
- Alma mater: UCLA; Pasadena Playhouse
- Occupation: Actress
- Years active: 1929–1975
- Known for: Mata Hari; Scarface; The Phantom of Crestwood; Pride and Prejudice
- Spouses: Charles Vidor (m. 1932; div. 1943) Lloyd Gough (m. 1943; died 1984)
- Children: 1

Karen Morley (born Mildred Linton; December 12, 1909 – March 8, 2003) was an American film actress.

== Life and career ==
Born Mildred Linton in Ottumwa, Iowa, Morley lived there until she was 13 years old. When she moved to Hollywood, she attended Hollywood High School. She went on to attend the University of California, but she dropped out to join the Los Angeles Civic Repertory Theatre and the Pasadena Playhouse.

After working at the Pasadena Playhouse, she came to the attention of the director Clarence Brown, at a time when he had been looking for an actress to stand in for Greta Garbo in screen tests. This led to a contract with Metro-Goldwyn-Mayer (MGM) and roles in films such as Mata Hari (1931), Scarface (1932), The Phantom of Crestwood (1932), The Mask of Fu Manchu (1932), Arsene Lupin (1932), Gabriel Over the White House (1933), and Dinner at Eight (1933). She left MGM in 1934 after having a dispute with the studio over her marriage to Charles Vidor and her decision to have children.

After World War II, she returned to Hollywood and became involved in labor union activity with the Screen Actors' Guild.

Her career came to an end in 1947, when she testified before the House Un-American Activities Committee and refused to answer questions about her alleged American Communist Party membership. She maintained her political activism for the rest of her life.

After being blacklisted from Hollywood, she moved to New York City. In 1952, she appeared in The Banker's Daughter on Broadway with her second husband. In 1954, she ran unsuccessfully for lieutenant governor of New York on the American Labor Party ticket.

In December 1999, at the age of 90, she appeared in Vanity Fair in an article about blacklist survivors, and she was honored at the San Francisco Film Festival.

== Personal life ==
In November 1932, Morley married director Charles Vidor in Santa Ana, California. They were divorced on March 2, 1943. Vidor and Morley had a son. She married actor Lloyd Gough in 1943, with whom she shared political leanings. Gough died in 1984.

== Death ==
Morley lived at the retirement facility Beautiful Montana Gardens in Santa Monica, California during her later years. She died of pneumonia at the Motion Picture and Television Hospital at age of 93 in Woodland Hills, California. She was survived by three grandchildren and two great-grandchildren.

== Partial filmography ==
- Thru Different Eyes (1929) bit part (uncredited)
- Inspiration (1931) as Liane Latour
- Daybreak (1931) as Emily Kessner
- Never the Twain Shall Meet (1931) as Maisie
- Politics (1931) as Myrtle Burns
- High Stakes (1931) as Anne Cornwall
- The Sin of Madelon Claudet (1931) as Alice
- The Cuban Love Song (1931) as Crystal
- Mata Hari (1931) as Carlotta
- Arsene Lupin (1932) as Sonia
- Are You Listening? (1932) as Alice Grimes
- Scarface (1932) as Poppy
- The Man About Town (1932) as Helena
- The Washington Masquerade (1932) as Consuela Fairbanks
- Downstairs (1932) as Karl's New Employer (uncredited)
- The Phantom of Crestwood (1932) as Jenny Wren
- The Mask of Fu Manchu (1932) as Sheila Barton
- Flesh (1932) as Laura Nash
- Gabriel Over the White House (1933) as Pendola Molloy
- Dinner at Eight (1933) as Mrs. Lucy Talbot
- The Crime Doctor (1934) as Andra
- Our Daily Bread (1934) as Mary Sims
- Straight Is the Way (1934) as Bertha
- Wednesday's Child (1934) as Kathryn Phillips
- Black Fury (1935) as Anna Novak
- $10 Raise (1935) as Emily Converse
- The Healer (1935) as Evelyn Allen
- Thunder in the Night (1935) as Madalaine
- The Littlest Rebel (1935) as Mrs. Cary
- Devil's Squadron (1936) as Martha Dawson
- Beloved Enemy (1936) as Cathleen O'Brien
- Outcast (1937) as Margaret Stevens
- The Girl from Scotland Yard (1937) as Linda Beech
- The Last Train from Madrid (1937) as Baroness Helene Rafitte
- On Such a Night (1937) as Gail Stanley
- Kentucky (1938) as Mrs. Goodwin – 1861
- Pride and Prejudice (1940) as Mrs. Collins
- Jealousy (1945) as Dr. Monica Anderson
- The Unknown (1946) as Rachel Martin Arnold
- The Thirteenth Hour (1947) as Eileen Blair
- Framed (1947) as Beth
- Samson and Delilah (1949) (uncredited)
- M (1951) as Mrs. Coster
- Born to the Saddle (1953) as Kate Daggett
