= Dion Anderson =

American actor (1938–2026)

- Born: August 6, 1938; Cameron, Texas, U.S.
- Died: April 26, 2026 (aged 87)
- Occupation: Actor

Dion Anderson (August 6, 1938 – April 26, 2026) was an American actor.

== Life and career ==
Dion Anderson was born in Cameron, Texas, on August 6, 1938. He is known for his role as Head Bull Haig in The Shawshank Redemption (1994), and in Mr. Deeds (2002), as well as roles in television, including The X-Files (1996).

Anderson died on April 26, 2026, at the age of 87.
