= List of German films of 1938 =

This is a list of the most notable films produced in the Cinema of Germany in 1938.

== A–L ==
Title	Director	Cast	Genre	Notes
Adrienne Lecouvreur	Marcel L'Herbier	Yvonne Printemps, Pierre Fresnay, Junie Astor	Historical	Co-production with France.
Adventure in Love	Hans H. Zerlett	Olga Tschechowa, Paul Klinger, Georg Alexander	Comedy	
After Midnight	Carl Hoffmann	Gina Falckenberg, René Deltgen, Alexander Engel	Drama	Co-production with France
Anna Favetti	Erich Waschneck	Brigitte Horney, Mathias Wieman, Gina Falckenberg	Drama	
Between the Parents	Hans Hinrich	Willy Fritsch, Jutta Freybe, Gusti Huber	Drama	
The Blue Fox	Viktor Tourjansky	Zarah Leander, Willy Birgel, Paul Hörbiger	Comedy	
By a Silken Thread	Robert A. Stemmle	Willy Fritsch, Käthe von Nagy, Carl Kuhlmann	Drama	
Capriccio	Karl Ritter	Lilian Harvey, Viktor Staal, Paul Kemp	Comedy	
Carmen, The Girl from Triana	Florián Rey	Imperio Argentina, Rafael Rivelles, Manuel Luna	Musical	Co-production with Spain
Comrades at Sea	Heinz Paul	Theodor Loos, Carola Höhn, Julius Brandt	War	
Coral Reefs	Maurice Gleize	Jean Gabin, Michèle Morgan, Pierre Renoir	Drama	French-language film. Made by UFA's French subsidiary.
Covered Tracks	Veit Harlan	Kristina Söderbaum, Philip Dorn, Charlotte Schultz	Mystery drama	
Dance on the Volcano	Hans Steinhoff	Gustaf Gründgens, Sybille Schmitz, Gisela Uhlen	Historical	
The Day After the Divorce	Paul Verhoeven	Luise Ullrich, Johannes Riemann, Hans Söhnker	Comedy	
The Deruga Case	Fritz Peter Buch	Willy Birgel, Geraldine Katt, Dagny Servaes	Crime	
Faded Melody	Viktor Tourjansky	Brigitte Horney, Willy Birgel, Carl Raddatz	Drama	
Five Million Look for an Heir	Carl Boese	Heinz Rühmann, Leny Marenbach, Oskar Sima	Comedy	
Fools in the Snow	Hans Deppe	Anny Ondra, Paul Klinger, Gisela Schlüter	Comedy	
Frau Sixta	Gustav Ucicky	Gustav Fröhlich, Franziska Kinz, Ilse Werner	Drama	
Freight from Baltimore	Hans Hinrich	Hilde Weissner, Attila Hörbiger, Hans Zesch-Ballot	Drama	
The Four Companions	Carl Froelich	Ingrid Bergman, Sabine Peters, Carsta Löck	Drama	
Gastspiel im Paradies	Karl Hartl	Hilde Krahl, Albert Matterstock, Georg Alexander	Comedy	
The Girl of Last Night	Peter Paul Brauer	Willy Fritsch, Georg Alexander, Ingeborg von Kusserow	Comedy	
A Girl Goes Ashore	Werner Hochbaum	Elisabeth Flickenschildt, Günther Lüders, Erika Glässner	Drama	
The Girl with a Good Reputation	Hans Schweikart	Olga Tschechowa, Attila Hörbiger, Josef Eichheim	Comedy	
The Great and the Little Love	Josef von Báky	Jenny Jugo, Gustav Fröhlich, Rudi Godden	Comedy	
The Holm Murder Case	Erich Engels	Ursula Deinert, Walter Steinbeck, Elisabeth Wendt	Mystery	
I Love You	Herbert Selpin	Viktor de Kowa, Luise Ullrich, Olga Limburg	Comedy	
The Impossible Mister Pitt	Harry Piel	Harry Piel, Willi Schur, Hilde Weissner	Thriller	
The Indian Tomb	Richard Eichberg	Philip Dorn, La Jana, Theo Lingen	Adventure	
Jugend	Veit Harlan	Kristina Söderbaum, Eugen Klöpfer, Hermann Braun	Drama	Title translation: "Youth."
The Jumping Jack	Karlheinz Martin	Hilde Krahl, Wolf Albach-Retty, Philip Dorn	Comedy	
Little County Court	Alwin Elling	Hans Moser, Ida Wüst, Lucie Englisch	Comedy	
Love Letters from Engadin	Luis Trenker	Luis Trenker, Carla Rust, Erika von Thellmann	Comedy	

== M–Z ==
Title	Director	Cast	Genre	Notes
The Man Who Couldn't Say No	Mario Camerini	Karl Ludwig Diehl, Karin Hardt, Leo Slezak	Comedy	
The Marriage Swindler	Herbert Selpin	Viktoria von Ballasko, Kurt Waitzmann, Hilde Körber	Comedy	
Men, Animals and Sensations	Harry Piel	Harry Piel, Ruth Eweler, Elisabeth Wendt	Drama	
Monika	Heinz Helbig	Maria Andergast, Iván Petrovich, Theodor Loos	Drama	
The Mountain Calls	Luis Trenker	Luis Trenker, Heidemarie Hatheyer, Peter Elsholtz	Drama	
The Muzzle	Erich Engel	Ralph Arthur Roberts, Hilde Weissner, Charlotte Schellhorn	Comedy	
Mystery About Beate	Johannes Meyer	Lil Dagover, Albrecht Schoenhals, Sabine Peters	Drama	
The Mystery of Betty Bonn	Robert A. Stemmle	Maria Andergast, Theodor Loos, Hans Nielsen	Adventure	
Nanon	Herbert Maisch	Johannes Heesters, Dagny Servaes	Musical	
Napoleon Is to Blame for Everything	Curt Goetz	Valerie von Martens, Kirsten Heiberg	Comedy	
A Night in May	Georg Jacoby	Marika Rökk, Viktor Staal	Comedy	
The Night of Decision	Nunzio Malasomma	Pola Negri, Hans Zesch-Ballot, Sabine Peters	Drama	
Nights in Andalusia	Herbert Maisch	Imperio Argentina, Friedrich Benfer, Karl Klüsner	Musical	
Northern Lights	Herbert B. Fredersdorf	René Deltgen, Ferdinand Marian, Hilde Sessak	Adventure	
The Optimist	E.W. Emo	Viktor de Kowa, Henny Porten, Gusti Huber	Comedy	
People Who Travel	Jacques Feyder	Françoise Rosay, André Brulé, Marie Glory	Drama	French-language version of Travelling People
Pour le Mérite	Karl Ritter	Paul Hartmann, Albert Hehn, Paul Otto	Drama	In praise of war veterans rejecting the Weimar Republic.
A Prussian Love Story	Paul Martin	Lída Baarová, Willy Fritsch, Harry Liedtke	Historical	
Red Orchids	Nunzio Malasomma	Olga Chekhova, Albrecht Schoenhals, Camilla Horn	Crime	
Revolutionary Wedding	Hans H. Zerlett	Brigitte Horney, Friedrich Benfer, Paul Hartmann	Historical drama	
The Roundabouts of Handsome Karl	Carl Froelich	Heinz Rühmann, Karin Hardt	Comedy	
Rubber	Eduard von Borsody	René Deltgen, Gustav Diessl, Herbert Hübner	Adventure	
Secret Code LB 17	Viktor Tourjansky	Willy Birgel, Hilde Weissner	Thriller	
The Secret Lie	Nunzio Malasomma	Pola Negri, Hermann Braun	Drama	
Secret Mission	Jürgen von Alten	Gustav Fröhlich, Camilla Horn, Paul Wegener	Thriller	
Sergeant Berry	Herbert Selpin	Hans Albers, Alexander Golling	Western	
So You Don't Know Korff Yet?	Fritz Holl	Heinz Rühmann, Victor Janson, Fritz Rasp	Comedy	
S.O.S. Sahara	Jacques de Baroncelli	Charles Vanel, Jean-Pierre Aumont	Drama	French-language film. Made by UFA's French subsidiary.
The Stars Shine	Hans H. Zerlett	La Jana, Vera Bergman, Carla Rust	Musical revue	
Storms in May	Hans Deppe	Viktor Staal, Hansi Knoteck	Drama	
The Strange Monsieur Victor	Jean Grémillon	Raimu, Madeleine Renaud, Pierre Blanchar	Drama	French-language film. Made by UFA's French subsidiary.
Travelling People	Jacques Feyder	Hans Albers, Françoise Rosay	Drama	A separate French-language version was also made
Thirteen Chairs	E.W. Emo	Heinz Rühmann, Hans Moser, Inge List	Comedy	
Triad	Hans Hinrich	Lil Dagover, Paul Hartmann	Drama	
What Now, Sibylle?	Peter Paul Brauer	Jutta Freybe, Ingeborg von Kusserow, Hans Leibelt	Comedy	
The Woman at the Crossroads	Josef von Báky	Ewald Balser, Magda Schneider, Karin Hardt	Drama	
Urlaub auf Ehrenwort	Karl Ritter			Leave on Parole
You and I	Wolfgang Liebeneiner	Brigitte Horney, Joachim Gottschalk	Romance	
Yvette	Wolfgang Liebeneiner	Käthe Dorsch, Ruth Hellberg	Drama	

== Documentaries ==
Title	Director	Cast	Genre	Notes
Aus der Heimat des Freischütz	Rudolf Gutscher		documentary	
Die Bauten Adolf Hitlers	Walter Hege		documentary	Adolf Hitlers Constructions;
Der Bienenstaat	Ulrich K.T. Schultz, Wolfram Junghans		Documentary	
Deutsche Weihnacht	Max Zehenthofer		Documentary	
España heroica	Paul Laven		documentary	Heroic Spain; about Spanish Civil War
Eine Fahrt zur Zugspitze	Norman Dix		Documentary	
Franz Schubert und seine Heimat	Norman Dix		Documentary	
Gestern und heute	Hans Steinhoff		Montage documentary	Yesterday and today
Der größte Fahrstuhl der Welt	Kurt Stefan		Documentary	
Die große Zeit	Carl Junghans, Gert Stegemann		Documentary	
Großstadt-Typen	Leo de Laforgue		Documentary	
Henkel - Ein deutsches Werk in seiner Arbeit	Walter Ruttmann		documentary	
Im Dienste der Menschheit	Walter Ruttmann		documentary	
Im Zeichen des Vertrauens. Ein Beyer-Film	Walter Ruttmann		documentary	
Jagd auf Raubfische	Hans Helfritz		Documentary	
Libellen	Ulrich K.T. Schultz, Wolfram Junghans		Documentary	
Michelangelo	Curt Oertel		Documentary	Shown at the 1938 Venice Film Festival
München	Ulrich Kayser		Documentary	
Münchener Oktoberfest	Max Grix		Documentary	
Münster, Westfalens schöne Hauptstadt			Documentary	
Natur und Technik	Ulrich K.T. Schultz		Documentary	
NS-Kampfspiele 1937	Geza von Kolb		Documentary	
Olympia 1. Teil - Fest der Völker	Leni Riefenstahl			Olympics, Part 1 - Celebration of the People; documentary of 1936 Summer Olympics. Shows Opening Ceremonies, Jesse Owens race, marathons
Olympia 2. Teil - Fest der Schönheit	Leni Riefenstahl			Olympics, Part 2 - Celebration of Beauty; includes field hockey, soccer, bicycling, equestrian, aquatic and gymnastic events, the Pentathlon, the Decathlon and Closing Ceremonies.
Rätsel der Urwaldhölle	O. Schulz-Kampthenkel		Documentary	
Riemenschneider - Der Meister von Würzburg	Walter Hege			documentary
Schiff ohne Klassen - Die Wilhelm Gustloff			Documentary	Documentary about the Wilhelm Gustloff;
Sehnsuchtsland unserer Jugend	Hans Helfritz		Documentary	
Stammgäste an der Nordsee	Ulrich K.T. Schultz		Documentary	
Vögel über Haff und Wiesen	Heinz Sielmann		Documentary	
Was du ererbt	Herbert Gerdes		Documentary	
Winterreise durch Südmandschurien	Arnold Fanck		Documentary	
Wort und Tat	Fritz Hippler		documentary	Words and Deeds; displays the progress of Germany under Hitler by a series of montages

== Short films ==
Title	Director	Cast	Genre	Notes
Hänschen Klein	Arnold Fanck		short	
Kaiserbauten in Fernost	Arnold Fanck		short	
Katharine	Elly Heuss-Knapp, Rudi Klemm		animation	
Et orientalsk kunststykke			animation	co-produced with Norway
En sigarett - en drøm	Hans Fischerkoesen		animation	co-produced with Norway
Silah basina			animation	
Sjakk matt	Hans Fischerkoesen		animation	co-produced with Norway
Tenor			animation	co-produced with Norway
Im Zeichen des Vertrauens. Ein Beyer-Film	Walter Ruttmann			
Zum guten Tropfen			animation	
