= Yahya el hub =

1938 film

Yahya El Hub
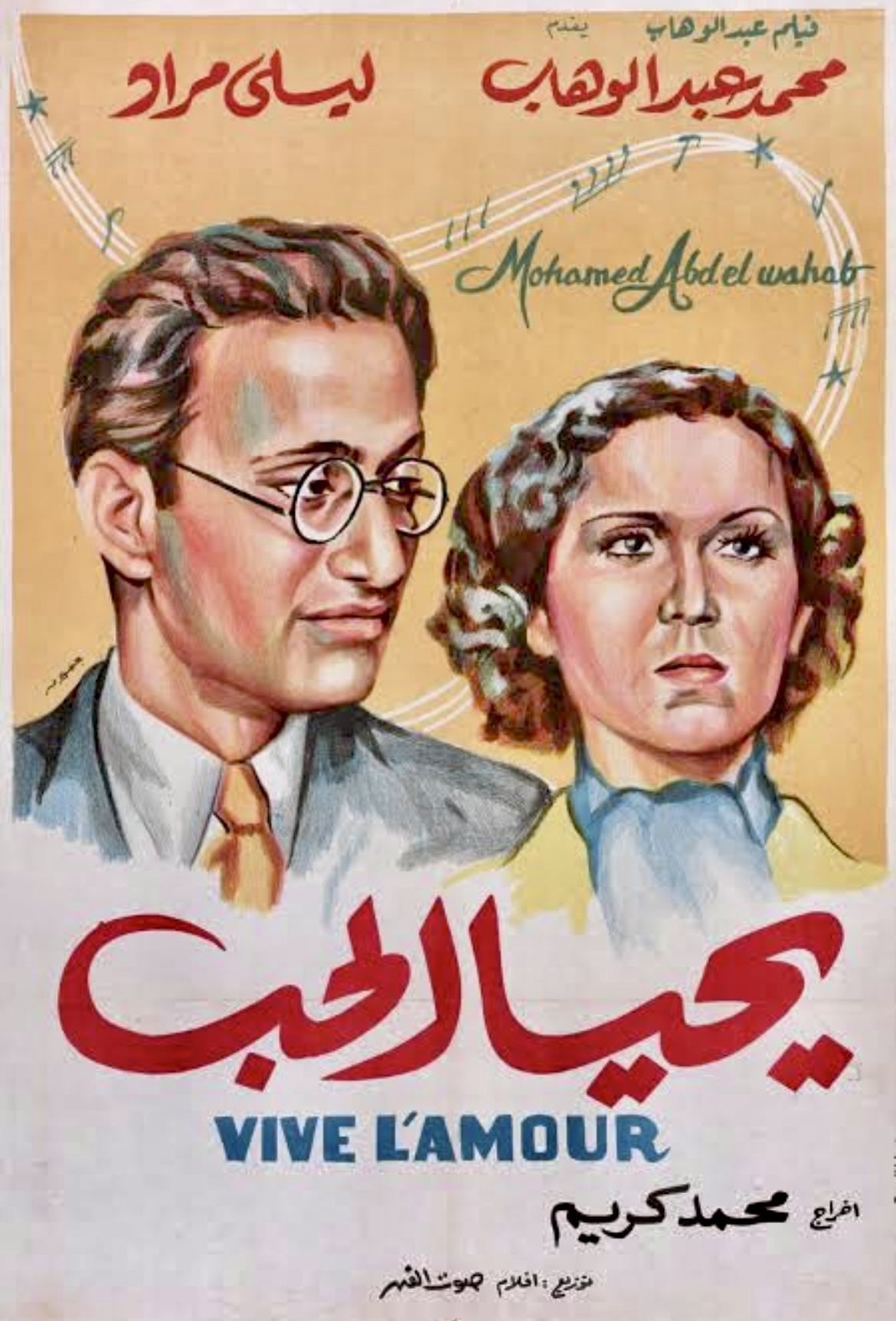
- Film poster
- Directed by: Mohammed Karim
- Written by: Mohammed Karim; Abbas Allam
- Produced by: Mohammed Abdel Wahab
- Starring: Mohammed Abdel Wahab; Leila Mourad
- Cinematography: Georges Benoît
- Edited by: Mohammed Karim
- Music by: Mohammed Abdel Wahab
- Production company: Sout El Fan Films
- Distributed by: Mohammed Abdel Wahab Films
- Release date: 24 January 1938 (Egypt)
- Running time: 125 minutes
- Country: Egypt
- Language: Egyptian Arabic

Yahya El Hub (Arabic: يحيا الحب, French: Vive l'amour) is a 1938 Egyptian drama film written, directed by Mohammed Karim. It stars Mohammed Abdel Wahab and Leila Mourad.

== Synopsis ==
Mohamed Fathi rents a new apartment facing the palace of Taher Pasha, Nadia's father. A misunderstanding occurs between Fathi and Nadia. Then he discovers that she is the niece of his boss at work at Banque Misr. As soon as Nadia complains to him, he decides to move him to Beni Suef. Fathi discovers the truth about the misunderstanding, and they fall in love. In love, Nadia tries to request the cancellation of the transfer order.

== Cast ==
- Mohammed Abdel Wahab as Mohamed Fathy Radwan
- Leila Mourad as Nadia Mohamed Taher
- Abdel Wareth Asar as Radwan Pasha
- Amin Wahba as Megahed Abdelrahman Megahed
- Mohamed Fadel as Mohamed Taher Pasha
- Mohamed Abdel Quddous as Shaker Bey
- Raeisa Afify as Ghenaa
- Zuzu Mady as Seham Radwan
- Amaal Zayed as Party singer
- Mimi Aziz as Dog's owner
- Abbas Rahmi as Fathy's friend
- Gamil Shehab as Hamdi

== See also ==
- Egyptian cinema
- List of Egyptian films of the 1930s
