= Fay Holden =

American actress (1893–1973)

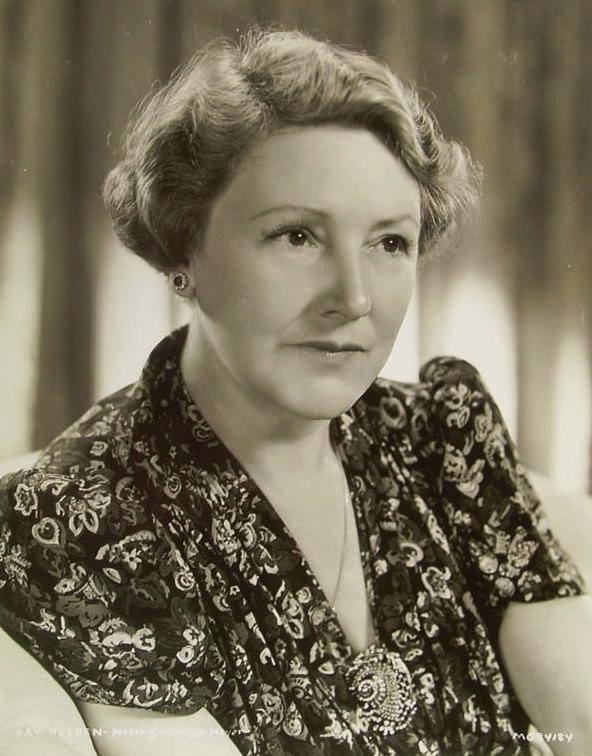
- Publicity still from about 1940
- Born: Dorothy Fay Hammerton; 26 September 1893; Birmingham, Warwickshire, England
- Died: 23 June 1973 (aged 79); Los Angeles, California, U.S.
- Resting place: Forest Lawn Memorial Park, Glendale
- Occupation: Actress
- Years active: 1935–1958
- Spouse: David Clyde (1914–1945; his death)

Dorothy Fay Hammerton (26 September 1893 – 23 June 1973), known professionally as Fay Holden, was a British-born, American-based actress. She was known as Gaby Fay early in her career.

== Biography ==
Holden was born in Birmingham, England. After leaving England in 1929, Holden and her husband moved to Vancouver, British Columbia, Canada for a time. They co-owned The Empress Theatre until 1933, and they created a theatre company, The British Guild Players, that specialized in comedies during the depression era. Eventually they left Vancouver and moved to Hollywood.

Holden appeared in 46 motion pictures between 1935 and 1958, and she is best known for her recurring role as Emily Hardy, mother of Mickey Rooney's character in the Andy Hardy film series. The series was enormously popular in the late 1930s and early 1940s, and Holden was in 15 of the 16 Hardy movies, surpassed only by Rooney, who was in all 16.

Holden is remembered for her performance as Hazel, the mother of Samson (Victor Mature), in Cecil B. DeMille's Samson and Delilah, in which she utters her character's most notable line: "He wants to marry a Philistine!"

She was married to David Clyde from 1914 until his death in 1945. She died in Los Angeles, California, aged 79, from cancer.

== Partial filmography ==
- The Pace That Kills (1935) as Madame / Henchwoman
- I Married a Doctor (1936) as Ella Stowbody
- The White Angel (1936) as Queen Victoria (uncredited)
- Wives Never Know (1936) as Mrs. Gossamer
- Polo Joe (1936) as Aunt Minnie
- The Accusing Finger (1936) as Little Old Lady (uncredited)
- Guns of the Pecos (1937) as Aunt Carrie Burton
- Bulldog Drummond Escapes (1937) as Natalie
- Internes Can't Take Money (1937) as Mother Teresa
- King of Gamblers (1937) as Nurse
- Exclusive (1937) as Mrs. Swain
- Souls at Sea (1937) as Mrs. Martin (uncredited)
- Double or Nothing (1937) as Martha Sewell Clark
- You're Only Young Once (1937) as Mrs. Emily Hardy
- Love Is a Headache (1938) as Mary, Peter's Secretary
- Judge Hardy's Children (1938) as Mrs. Emily Hardy
- Test Pilot (1938) as Lingerie Saleslady (uncredited)
- Hold That Kiss (1938) as Mrs. Evans
- Love Finds Andy Hardy (1938) as Mrs. Emily Hardy
- Out West with the Hardys (1938) as Mrs. Emily Hardy
- Sweethearts (1938) as Hannah
- Sergeant Madden (1939) as Mary Madden
- The Hardys Ride High (1939) as Mrs. Emily Hardy
- Andy Hardy Gets Spring Fever (1939) as Mrs. Emily Hardy
- Judge Hardy and Son (1939) as Mrs. Emily Hardy
- Andy Hardy Meets Debutante (1940) as Mrs. Emily Hardy
- Bitter Sweet (1940) as Mrs. Millick
- Andy Hardy's Private Secretary (1941) as Mrs. Emily Hardy
- The Penalty (1941) (scenes deleted)
- Washington Melodrama (1941) as Mrs. Claymore
- Ziegfeld Girl (1941) as Mrs. Regan
- I'll Wait for You (1941) as Mrs. Miller
- Blossoms in the Dust (1941) as Mrs. Kahly
- Life Begins for Andy Hardy (1941) as Mrs. Emily Hardy
- H.M. Pulham, Esq. (1941) as Mrs. John Pulham
- The Courtship of Andy Hardy (1942) as Mrs. Emily Hardy
- Andy Hardy's Double Life (1942) as Mrs. Emily Hardy
- Andy Hardy's Blonde Trouble (1944) as Mrs. Emily Hardy
- Canyon Passage (1946) as Mrs. Overmire
- Little Miss Big (1946) as Mary Jane Baxter
- Love Laughs at Andy Hardy (1946) as Mrs. Emily Hardy
- Whispering Smith (1948) as Emmy Dansing
- Samson and Delilah (1949) as Hazelelponit
- The Big Hangover (1950) as Martha Belney
- Andy Hardy Comes Home (1958) as Mrs. Emily Hardy (final film role)
