= Cecilia Parker =

Canadian-American actress (1914–1993)

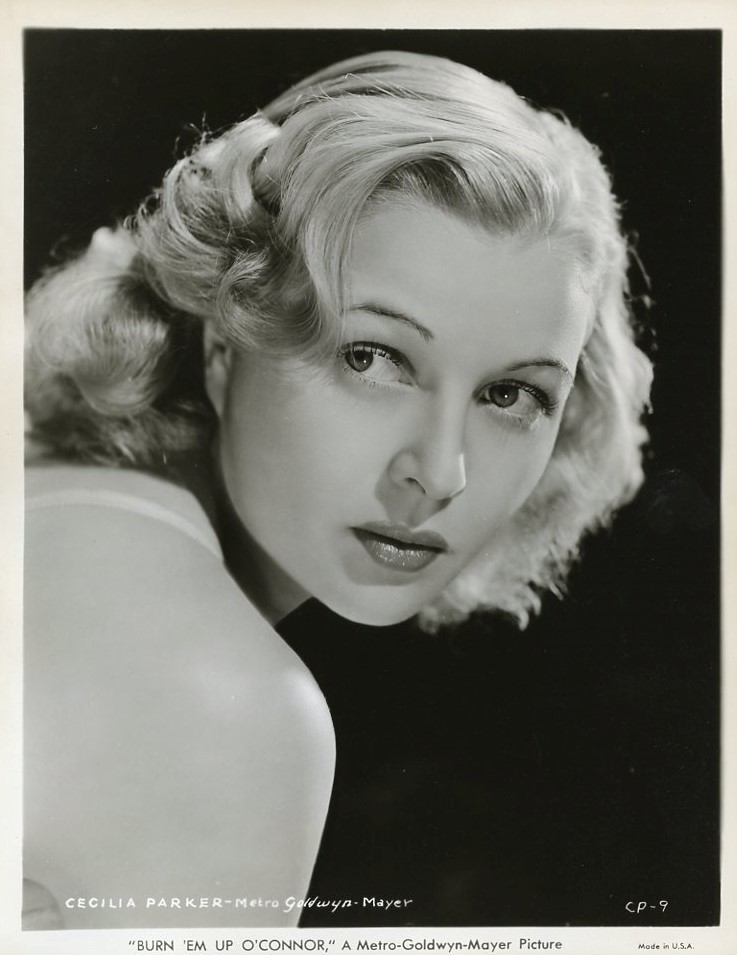
- Parker in Burn 'Em Up O'Connor (1939)
- Born: April 26, 1914; Fort William, Ontario, Canada
- Died: July 25, 1993 (aged 79); Los Angeles, California, United States
- Years active: 1926–1942, 1958, 1984
- Spouse: Robert Baldwin (m. 1938)
- Children: 3

Cecilia Parker (April 26, 1914 – July 25, 1993) was a Canadian-American film actress. She was best known for portraying Marian Hardy, the sister of Andy Hardy, in twelve films of the Andy Hardy series.

== Early life ==
Cecilia Parker was born in Fort William, Ontario, Canada on April 26, 1914, to parents Naudy Anna and Thomas J. Parker. When World War I began, she went with her parents to England, and he joined the British Army. After the war ended, the family returned to Fort William, where they remained until she was 9 years old. Then they moved to Los Angeles, California. She graduated from Immaculate Heart High School in 1931. Parker was selected from among a group of extras to attend the Fox Film studio training school for younger players. By March 1934 her parents had separated. Parker's income provided the sole support as she and her mother lived "in an unassuming flat".

== Career ==
Parker worked in films as an extra and did bit parts until at one point a casting directer singled her out from a group of extras for a screen test. As a result, her first film role was opposite George O'Brien in The Rainbow Trail (1932). The Rainbow Trail, written by Zane Grey, was the novelist's sequel to Riders of the Purple Sage. That film was followed by Mystery Ranch (1932), in which she again appeared with O'Brien. Parker starred with Tom Tyler and Carmelita Geraghty in a 1932–1933 movie serial produced by Universal Pictures entitled Jungle Mystery. In July 1933, she was chosen to play the heroine in the Ken Maynard western, The Trail Drive (1933). That same year, she was John Wayne's leading lady in one of the first singing cowboy movies, Riders of Destiny, and also appeared in Rainbow Ranch. Another serial in which she appeared was The Lost Jungle (1934).

After playing the sister of Greta Garbo in 1934's The Painted Veil, Parker signed a long-term contract with Metro-Goldwyn-Mayer. The studio wanted a blonde who resembled Garbo as a young girl. Her new contract called for a starting salary of US$75 (equivalent to $1,800 in 2025) a week and scaled up to $1,000 (equivalent to $21,900 in 2025) a week for the seventh year.

In November 1935, Parker purchased a new home in Beverly Hills, California. The following year she joined the ballet school of Dave Gould at MGM, along with Maureen O'Sullivan. By the fall of 1936, Parker was studying singing.

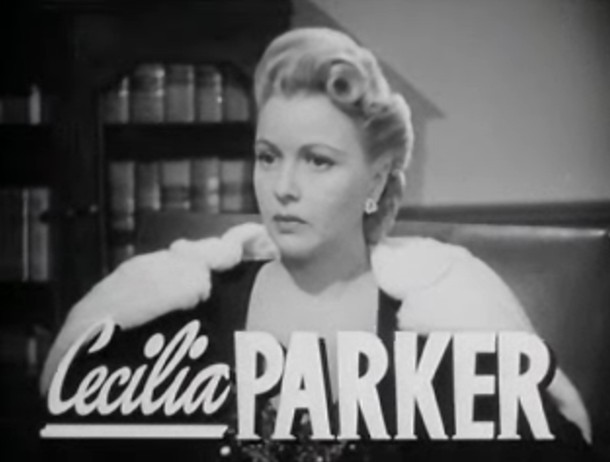
Trailer of Grand Central Murder (1942)

Parker was best known for playing Marian Hardy in the extremely popular Andy Hardy film series in the late 1930s and early 1940s. She was in the original Hardy film, A Family Affair, in 1937. Mickey Rooney played Andy Hardy in the series, supported by Lewis Stone, Fay Holden and Parker portraying his family members, with Ann Rutherford as his sweetheart. Parker's character appeared in 12 of the 16 films, and her romances were a recurring feature of the series.

Parker retired from acting after the film Andy Hardy's Double Life (1942). She and her husband operated a real estate business in Ventura, California, from 1946 to 1989.

Though her Marian Hardy character was absent from the last two Andy Hardy films of the 1940s, Parker briefly returned to acting for the last Andy Hardy movie, 1958's Andy Hardy Comes Home; the attempt to revive and update the series was not a success. She made one last screen appearance, in a 1984 television adaptation of the novel Pudd'nhead Wilson, on the anthology series American Playhouse.

== Personal life ==
Parker's sister, Linda, was an actress who appeared in a number of uncredited roles in the early 1930s. Both sisters once tested for the same part in David Copperfield. Parker was a close friend of actress Anne Shirley; during the mid-1930s the two kept a standing dinner date on Thursday nights.

On June 1, 1938, she married actor Robert Baldwin, (or Dick Baldwin) in Ventura, California. He helped her to become a naturalized American citizen. The couple had three children together, a daughter and two sons. She became a naturalized citizen on April 26, 1940.

== Death ==
On July 25, 1993, Parker died age of 79, after what The New York Times called "a long illness".

== Sources ==
- Bismarck Tribune, "Fifth Hardy Family Picture Delightful", Friday, December 2, 1938, Page 8.
- Los Angeles Times, "Film Outlook During Summer Assumes Rosier Hue", June 14, 1931, Page B9.
- Los Angeles Times, "Chosen By Fortune For Screen Career", October 6, 1931, Page 10.
- Los Angeles Times, "Rainbow Trail Announced For Loew's State", December 22, 1931, Page A7.
- Los Angeles Times, "Tyler To Play Lead", May 31, 1932, Page A9.
- Los Angeles Times, "Cecilia Parker To Lead", July 16, 1933, Page A1.
- Los Angeles Times, "Court Accepts Young Player's Film Contract", July 25, 1934, Page A10.
- Los Angeles Times, "Odd and Interesting", September 25, 1934, Page 19.
- Los Angeles Times, "Around And About In Hollywood", November 6, 1935, Page A15.
- Los Angeles Times, "Around And About In Hollywood", February 17, 1936, Page A15.
- Los Angeles Times, "Around And About In Hollywood", February 18, 1936, Page A19.
- Portsmouth Ohio Times, "Cecilia Parker", Sunday, November 15, 1936, Page 68.
