= Getty (surname) =

Getty is a surname, and may refer to:

== Getty family members ==
People of the extended American Getty family, of celebrated wealth, sorted by date of birth:

- George Getty (1855–1930), American oil pioneer, father of J. Paul Getty
- J. Paul Getty (1892–1976), American industrialist
- Jacqueline Getty Phillips (1931–1992), American socialite and racehorse breeder, married as her second husband George F. Getty II, son of J. Paul Getty
- John Paul Getty Jr. (1932–2003), British-American businessman and philanthropist, son of J. Paul Getty, known also as Paul Getty
- Gordon Getty (born 1933), American heir and composer, son of J. Paul Getty
- Talitha Getty (1940–1971), Dutch actress, second wife of John Paul Getty Jr.
- Ann Getty (1941–2020), American publisher and philanthropist, wife of Gordon Getty
- Victoria Getty, Lady Getty, born Victoria Holdsworth (born 1944), English philanthropist, married as her second husband John Paul Getty, Jr.
- Gisela Getty (born 1949), German photographer and film director, designer, married to John Paul Getty III and then divorced
- John Paul Getty III (1956–2011), American Getty heir and kidnap victim, son of John Paul Getty Jr.
- Aileen Getty (born 1957), American heiress and activist, daughter of John Paul Getty, Jr.
- Mark Getty (born 1960), Irish-French businessman, son of John Paul Getty Jr.
- Domitilla Getty, married name of Domitilla Harding, 21st-century Italian designer and artist, married to Mark Getty and then divorced
- Ariadne Getty (born 1962), American philanthropist, daughter of John Paul Getty Jr.
- Pia Getty (born 1966), American heiress and socialite, former wife of Christopher Ronald Getty, grandson of J. Paul Getty
- Andrew Getty (1967–2015), American businessman, son of Gordon Getty
- Vanessa Getty (born 1972), American socialite and philanthropist, wife of William Paul Getty, the son of Gordon Getty and Ann Getty
- Balthazar Getty (born 1975), American actor and musician son of John Paul Getty III
- Sabine Getty (born 1984), Swiss-English jewelry designer, wife of Joseph Getty, the son of Mark Getty
- Kendalle Getty (born 1988), American artist, daughter of Gordon Getty
- Gigi Lazzarato Getty, known as Gigi Gorgeous (born 1992), Canadian YouTuber, actress and model, wife of Nats Getty
- Nats Getty (born 1992), American designer and LGBTQ rights activist, son of Ariadne Getty
- Isabel Getty (born 1993), American singer and artist, daughter of Pia and Christopher Ronald Getty
- August Getty (born 1994), American fashion designer, son of Ariadne Getty
- Ivy Getty (born 1994), American oil heiress and model, daughter of Ann and Gordon Getty

== Other people ==
- Charlie Getty (born 1952), American football player
- Clyde Getty (born 1961), Argentine freestyle skier
- Don Getty (1933–2016), Canadian athlete, businessman and politician from Alberta
- Edmund Getty (1799–1857), Irish antiquarian and naturalist
- Estelle Getty (1923–2008), American actress
- George W. Getty (1819–1901), United States Army general
- John Getty (footballer) (born 1918), Scottish footballer
- J. Arch Getty (1950–2025), American historian
- Keith Getty (born 1974), Northern Irish Christian singer and songwriter
- Kristyn Getty (born 1980), Northern Irish Christian singer and songwriter, wife of Keith Getty
- Robert J. Getty (1908–1963), Northern Irish classicist
- Robert Nelson Getty (1855–1941), United States Army officer
- Samuel Gibson Getty (c.1817–1877), British politician
- Susan Getty, British figure skater

== See also ==
- Keith & Kristyn Getty, duo
- Gatty
- Gettys
