= Ariadne Getty =

American philanthropist (born 1962)

- Born: 1962 (age 63–64); Rome, Italy
- Education: Bennington College
- Occupations: Philanthropist, businesswoman, film producer
- Spouse: Justin Williams (divorced)
- Children: Nats Getty; August Getty
- Parents: Sir John Paul Getty (father); Abigail Harris (mother)
- Family: Getty

Ariadne Getty (formerly Williams; born 1962) is an American philanthropist, businesswoman, and film producer.

== Early life and family ==
Getty was born in Rome to Sir John Paul Getty, a philanthropist, and Abigail Harris, a water polo champion. She spent much of her childhood outside of Siena, Italy She is a member of the Getty family and is the sister of John Paul Getty III, Mark Getty, and Aileen Getty and the half sister of Tara Getty. Her parents divorced in 1964 and her father remarried twice; first to Talitha Pol, a Dutch actress and model, and later to Victoria Holdsworth. She is the granddaughter of billionaire J. Paul Getty, the founder of Getty Oil Company, and Ann Rork Light, an actress. Getty's grandfather also was her godfather at her baptism in the Catholic Church. Getty attended Bennington College and Southover Manor School.

== Career ==
Getty is the CEO of her son's fashion line August Getty Atelier and of her other son Nats Getty’s lifestyle brand Strike Oil.

=== Film ===
In 2007, Getty produced the British comedy-thriller film The Baker. In 2010 she worked on the survivor-thriller film 127 Hours.

=== Philanthropy ===
In 2016, Getty joined the national board of directors of GLAAD. She was a speaker at the third annual GLAAD Summit on September 30, 2016, at the Beverly Hilton Hotel. Getty is passionate about LGBT rights, climate change, and women's rights, making most of her time and financial contributions to GLAAD and the United Nations foundation. Much of Ariadne's charitable work stems from her personal history; both of her children, Natalia (Nats) and August are gay, and much of Ariadne's philanthropic efforts go towards working with the LGBTQ community.

Getty is with Queen Rania of Jordan, Muhammad Yunus, Kofi Annan, and Ted Turner as an inaugural board member of the Better World Fund, a nonprofit that provides educational and advocacy support for the United Nations and causes regarding refugees and gender inequality. Through her work with Better World Fund, Getty has traveled to Uganda and the Democratic Republic of the Congo to visit refugee camps with stakeholders to provide better living conditions for refugees.

In September 2018, GLAAD presented the inaugural Ariadne Getty Ally Award to Alyssa Milano at its 49th anniversary gala in San Francisco; the Los Angeles LGBT Center honored Getty with the Rand Schrader Distinguished Scholar Vanguard Award; and she became a board member of the Gay Men's Chorus of Los Angeles. In August 2019, Variety named her the 2019 Philanthropist of the Year.

==== Ariadne Getty Foundation ====
Getty founded the Fuserna Foundation in 2004, later changing its name to the Ariadne Getty Foundation. She is its president and executive director. The foundation was formed to revitalize existing charities and individual charitable projects that were failing in their objectives due to financial constraints and/or lack of exposure and publicity.

The foundation is a major donor to the Los Angeles LGBT Center. In October 2017 it held a benefit concert that raised over $100,000 to help prevent bullying of LGBTQ youth. At the 2018 World Economic Forum in Davos Getty announced that her foundation would be giving $15 million to GLAAD to reverse the erosion of LGBTQ acceptance and help move the global LGBTQ community forward. A survey by the Harris Poll and GLAAD reported that LGBTQ acceptance in the United States had declined for the first time since the poll was first conducted. In 2018 Getty fulfilled her promise, donating $15 million for the GLAAD Media Institute, which seeks to spread LGBTQ acceptance by training journalists and people in the Hollywood film and television industries how to advocate for and tell the stories of LGBTQ people. The Ariadne Getty Foundation and GLAAD partnered in hosting the panel Progress in Peril: How Business, Philanthropy and Media Can Lead to Achieving 100% Acceptance for LGBTQ People at the World Economic Forum.

Additional partners of the foundation include the David Lynch Foundation, Family Equality Council, San Francisco Gay Men's Chorus, Transgender Law Center, UNICEF Next Generation, United Nations Foundation, and the Washington Blade.

== Personal life ==
Getty married Justin Williams, an actor, and had two children; fashion designer August Williams and fashion model Nats Getty, who are both a part of the LGBTQ community. She has said that her children inspired her passion for LGBTQ rights activism and philanthropy. She and Williams later divorced in 2005. She is in a long-term relationship with producer Louie Rubio.

=== Brother's kidnapping ===
Getty criticized the 2017 semibiographical crime film All the Money in the World, which focused on the 1973 kidnapping of her brother John Paul Getty III when he was sixteen years old, saying the film incorrectly depicted her family as obsessed with wealth. She also defended her grandfather, J. Paul Getty, saying that her grandfather was a loving and involved person in her life and did not behave as the film portrayed him.

In 2018, Getty threatened to take legal action against FX for their series Trust, which retells the story of her brother's 1973 kidnapping, saying that the series defames her family for implying they were complicit in the kidnapping.

== Media ==
Getty is portrayed by Lucy Gentili in the 2018 American drama television series Trust.
