= Sabine Getty =

Swiss-English jewelry designer (born 1984)

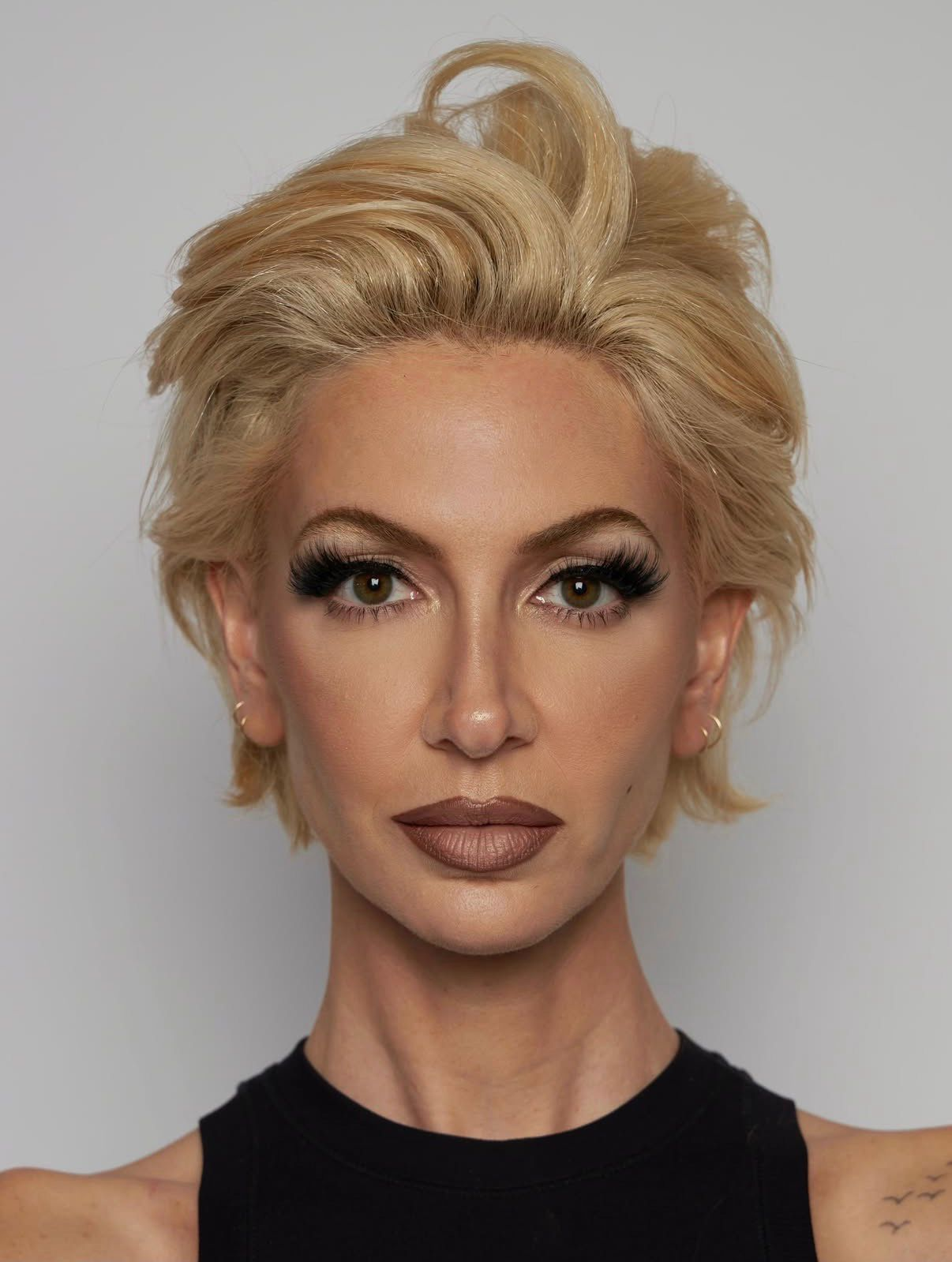
- Sabine Getty in 2026
- Born: Sabine Ghanem; August 14, 1984 (age 42); Geneva, Switzerland
- Education: Gemological Institute of America
- Occupations: Film Producer, Fashion Model, Jewelry designer, writer
- Years active: 2012–present
- Spouse: Joseph Getty (m. 2015)
- Children: 2
- Family: Ghanem, Getty
- Website: web.archive.org/web/20191208060516/https://sabinegetty.com/

Sabine Getty (née Ghanem; born August 14, 1984) is a British-Lebanese creative director, jewelry designer and executive film producer The Voice of Hind Rajab.

== Early life ==
Ghanem was born and raised in Geneva, Switzerland. Her father, Charbel Ghanem, is a Lebanese financier and her mother, Karine Ratl, is an Egyptian interior decorator. Ghanem speaks English, French and Arabic. She studied theatre and opera before switching to design. She graduated from the Gemological Institute of America in 2012 before moving to London.

== Education ==
Getty studied Communication and Media Studies at the American University of Paris (AUP). She later trained at the Gemological Institute of America (GIA), where she qualified in diamond grading and jewellery design.

== Career ==
Getty launched the Sabine Getty jewellery brand in 2012. Distinctive for its sculptural quality and narrative depth, the collection gained international recognition.Her pieces are stocked in over 20 boutiques and department stores worldwide, including Maxfield (Los Angeles), Neiman Marcus, Bergdorf Goodman (New York), Montaigne Market (Paris), and Browns (London).

Getty worked as a contributing editor for Tatler 2019-2021.

In January 2024 Getty was featured on the International Best Dressed List 2023 alongside Timothee Chalamet and Michelle Yeoh.

Walked the Gucci Cruise 2027 runway show, staged at Times Square, New York City, on 16 May 2026, under creative director Demna.

== Creative collaborations ==
Getty has undertaken a series of creative partnerships across disciplines:

- La Coqueta — children's clothing collaboration
- Aquazzura — limited-edition shoe collaboration
- Adriana Degreas — swimwear collection collaboration

== Film and television ==
Getty served as an executive producer on The Voice of Hind Rajab (2025), directed by Kaouther Ben Hania.

== Public appearances ==
In 2026, Getty attended the Met Gala wearing a custom gown by Ashi Studio. Her appearance was covered in fashion media including Vogue and BuzzFeed.

== Personal life ==
Ghanem married hedge fund manager Joseph Getty, son of Mark Getty and Domitilla Harding and a grandson of Sir John Paul Getty, in 2015 in a Catholic ceremony at the Basilica of the Twelve Apostles in Rome, Italy. Her dress was a custom made haute couture gown by Schiaparelli with a hooded cloak designed by Lesage and Charlotte Olympia heels.

Wedding guests included Princess Elisabeth von Thurn und Taxis, Princess Beatrice of York, Ginevra Elkann, Lady Getty, Charlotte Olympia Dellal, Pierre Casiraghi, Julia Restoin Roitfeld, and Bianca Brandolini d’Adda. A party celebrating the wedding celebrations was hosted at the Palazzo Taverna. The wedding reception was held at the Castle Odescalchi.

In 2019 Getty and her husband were featured in Tatler's 'Social Power List' alongside Prince William, Duke of Cambridge and Catherine, Duchess of Cambridge as having significant social influence in the United Kingdom.

In 2017 Getty gave birth to a daughter, Gene Honor Getty. In 2019 she gave birth to a son, Jupiter Mark Getty.
