= Gatty =

Gatty is a surname. Notable people with the surname include:

- Alfred Gatty (1813–1903), English Anglican priest and author
- Alfred Scott-Gatty (1847–1918), English officer of arms and composer
- Charles Henry Gatty (1836–1903), British zoologist and meteorologist
- Charles Tindal Gatty (1851–1928), British antiquarian, musician and author
- Harold Gatty (1892–1973), Australian aviation record holder
- Harsha Raj Gatty (born 1987), Indian activist vocational trainer
- Juliana Horatia Gatty, later Juliana Horatia Ewing (1841–1885), English writer, daughter of Alfred Gatty and Margaret Gatty
- Katharine Gatty (1870–1952), British nurse, journalist and suffragette
- Lina Scott Gatty (1873–1964), British politician
- Luis Gatty Ribeiro (born 1979), Bolivian footballer
- Marek Gatty-Kostyal (1886–1965), Polish chemist and pharmacist
- Margaret Gatty (1809–1873), British writer and marine biologist
- Nicholas Gatty (1874–1946), English composer and music critic, nephew of Alfred Scott-Gatty
- Oliver Gatty (1907–1940), British chemist and parapsychologist
- Stephen Herbert Gatty (1849–1922), British barrister and colonial judge

== See also ==
- Gatti
- Henry Gattie (1774–1844), British actor and singer
- Gattis
- Gatty Marine Laboratory
- Getty
