= John Paul Getty =

John Paul Getty may refer to:

- J. Paul Getty (1892–1976), American businessman
- Sir John Paul Getty Jr. (1932–2003), American-born philanthropist and book collector
- John Paul Getty III (1956–2011), elder son of John Paul Getty, Jr

== See also ==
- Getty family
- John Getty (disambiguation)
