= Talitha (yacht) =

Ship

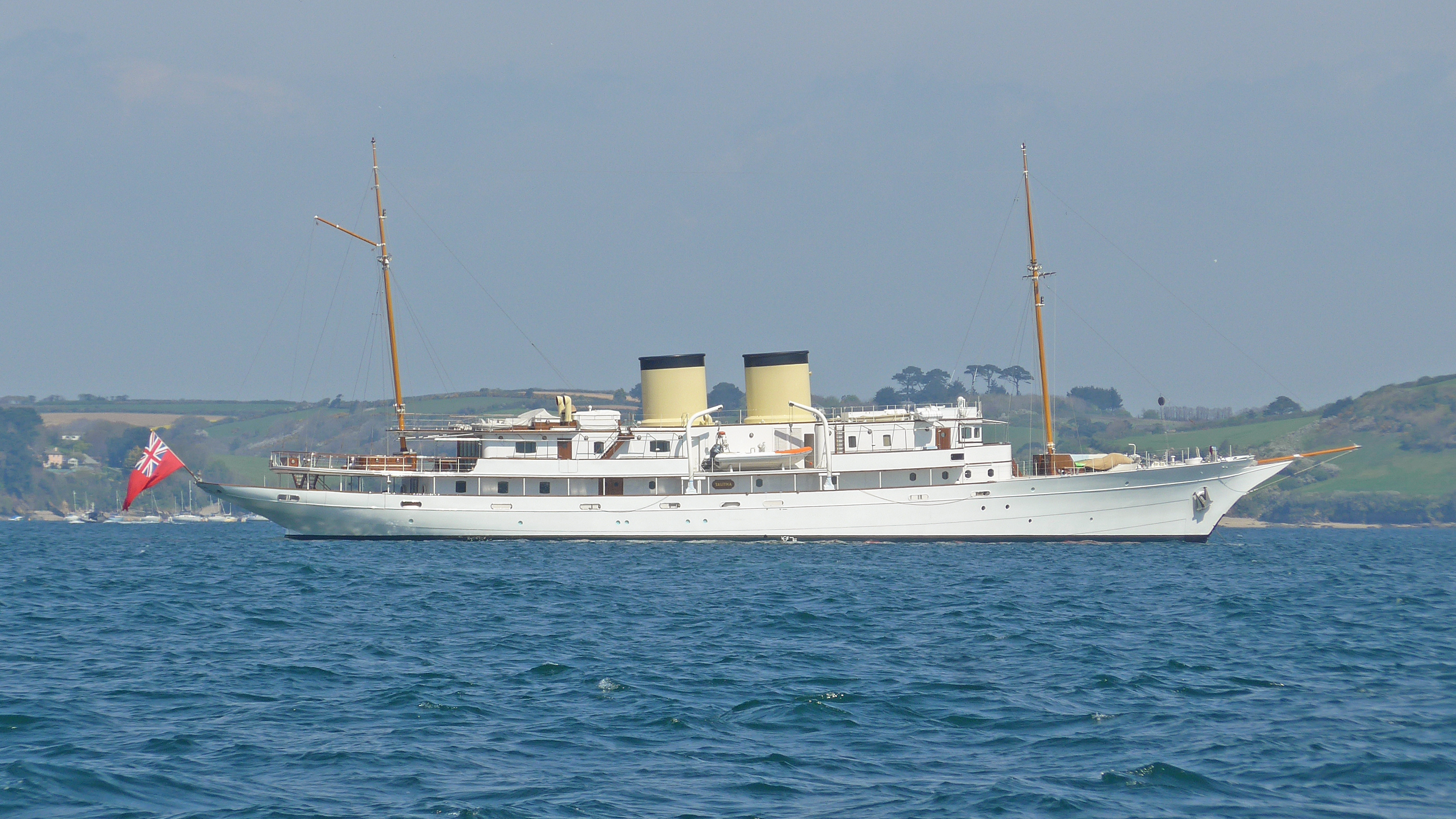
- Talitha in Carrick Roads, 2017

History
- Name: 1930–1931: Reveler; 1931–1939: Chalena; 1939–1942: Carola; 1942–1949: Beaumont; 1949–1983: Elpetal; 1983–1993: Jezebel; 1993–2008: Talitha G; from 2008: Talitha
- Owner: 1930–1931: Russell Alger Jr.; 1931–1939: Charles McCann; 1939–1942: Leon Mandel; 1942–1947: United States Navy; 1947–1957: Norman Woolworth; 1957–1983: Maris Embiricos; 1983–1993: Robert Stigwood; 1993–2008: Paul Getty; from 2008: Mark Getty
- Builder: Krupp Germaniawerft
- Yard number: 513
- Way number: p
- Laid down: 12 April 1929
- Completed: 30 September 1930
- Identification: IMO number: 1004625; MMSI number: 310051000; Callsign: ZCAN7
- Status: In service

General characteristics
- Tonnage: 1,108 GRT (as built); 1,103 GT (in 1994)
- Length: 226 ft 0 in (68.88 m) (as built); 271 ft 0 in (82.60 m) (in 1994)
- Beam: 34 ft 1 in (10.39 m)
- Draught: 12 ft 8 in (3.86 m)
- Installed power: Twin diesels
- Propulsion: Twin propellers
- Speed: 15.5 kn (28.7 km/h; 17.8 mph)

Talitha is a 1103 GT motor yacht owned since 2008 by Mark Getty. She was built in 1929–1930 by Krupp Germaniawerft at Kiel as Reveler for Russell Alger, chairman of the Packard Motor Car Company, and her subsequent owners include Robert Stigwood and Paul Getty. In 1942 she was purchased by the United States Navy and served as patrol gunboat USS Beaumont (PG-60) until 1946. The yacht has also carried the names Chalena, Carola, Elpetal, Jezebel and Talitha G.

== Design and construction ==
The future Talitha was designed by Cox & Stevens, New York and laid down in the German shipyard Krupp Germaniawerft at Kiel, as Yard No. 513, on 12 April 1929 for businessman Russell A Alger Jr., chairman of the Packard Motor Car Company. She measured 1,045 gross register tons and 444 net register tons, with a length of 226 ft 0 in (68.88 m) overall and 206 ft 0 in (62.79 m) waterline, breadth of 34 ft 1 in (10.39 m), depth of 17 ft 0 in (5.18 m) and draught of 12 ft 8 in (3.86 m). She was powered by two diesel engines, also made by Krupp, and totalling 2,200 brake horsepower (1,600 kW), driving twin propellers, and initially had a single funnel.

== Early service ==
Although launched for Russell Alger, he died before she was completed in 1930, and Reveler was laid up at the Gosport, Hampshire shipyard of Camper & Nicholson. In 1931 she was bought by Charles E. F. McCann, son-in-law of the founder of Woolworths stores, Frank Winfield Woolworth for some US$375,000, and fitting-out was finally completed. Reveler was renamed Chalena, drawing on the first names of the owner and his wife, Helena, allocated Callsign MJPT (changed the following year to WGEJ) and home-ported at New York. The yacht was based at the Glen Cove station of the New York Yacht Club. The yacht was sold in 1939 to Leon Mandel of Mandel Brothers department store in Chicago, and renamed Carola after his wife. Although based at Chicago, the yacht also cruised to Guatemala and the Galapagos Islands.

== World War 2 service ==
On 23 January 1942, Carola was acquired by the United States Navy, then classified as a patrol gunboat and designated PG-60. After conversion by the Gibbs Gas Engine Company at Jacksonville, Florida, during which her interior was gutted to make way for a complement of 110 and her clipper bow removed, she was commissioned as USS Beaumont on 22 June 1942, under the command of Lt. Comdr. John M. Cox, Jr. The ship was named after either the city of Beaumont, California or that of Beaumont, Texas. She was armed with two 3"/50 dual purpose and two 40mm guns.

Following shakedown training, Beaumont sailed from Key West on 2 August 1942, escorting several motor vessels to the Panama Canal Zone. She departed from Balboa on 16 August, arriving at her new base, Pearl Harbor, Hawaii on 2 September, where she was assigned to the Hawaiian Sea Frontier as a weather ship in support of the Pacific Fleet. Beaumont, alternating with USS San Bernardino (PG-59) (also a former motor yacht, Vanda), collected meteorological information across an area of the Pacific between her base in Oahu and Midway Island.

Following the end of the war on 2 September 1945, Beaumont continued to provide weather data to forecasters, but on 5 November finally departed Pearl Harbor for San Francisco, where she arrived on six days later, on Armistice Day. She was decommissioned on 19 February 1946 at Mare Island Naval Shipyard, and struck from the navy list on 28 March. On 20 February 1947 Beaumont was transferred to the United States Maritime Commission for disposal.

== Return to motor yacht ==
In February 1947 the former USS Beaumont renewed her connection with the F W Woolworth Company, as she was purchased by Norman B Woolworth, whose father, Frederick Woolworth, had established the British branch, F W Woolworth & Company7 Ltd. The yacht was renamed Elpetal, taken from the names of three of Woolworth's close friends, Eliot Fox, Peter Walton and Talbot Malcolm, and placed in the ownership of Elpetal Inc of New York After reconditioning at Bath Iron Works, Maine, the yacht measured 1,043 gross register tons and 423 net register tons, with a length of 214 ft 3 in (65.30 m), breadth of 34 ft 1 in (10.39 m), and depth of 17 ft 0 in (5.18 m). In 1957 Elpetal was sold to the Greek shipowner Maris Embiricos, without change of name. He owned her through Concordia Navigation Company, which registered her at Monrovia, Liberia. In the 1970s, following the death of his wife, Embiricos laid up the yacht at his family island of Petali, where she subsequently deteriorated.

The Australian-British music entrepreneur and film producer Robert Stigwood purchased the yacht in August 1983, sending her to Malta for a refit lasting eight months, which included restoration of her clipper bow. She reappeared as Jezebel in 1984 and cruised widely. Later, the yacht was again laid up, in Lisbon, after developing mechanical problems, and was sold in 1993 to John Paul Getty Jr., who renamed her Talitha G in memory of his second wife. The yacht received a three-year refit in 1991–1994, under supervision of Jon Bannenberg of Devonport Yachts at Devonport Management Limited, after which she was measured as 1,103 GT, with a length of 82.6 m (271 ft). Since John Paul Getty Jr.'s death in 2008 the yacht, with the name modified to Talitha, has been owned by his son, Mark Getty.
