= Getty =

Getty may refer to:

- Getty family
- Getty (surname)

== The Getty oil family businesses ==
- Getty Oil, founded by George Getty
- Getty Images, a stock photography company founded by Mark Getty

== Residences ==
- Getty House

=== The J. Paul Getty Trust, its programs, and its locations ===
- J. Paul Getty Trust, whose programs include the Museum, Research Institute, Conservation Institute, and Foundation
  - Getty Center, located in Los Angeles, California, home of the J. Paul Getty Trust, Getty Conservation Institute, Getty Foundation, Getty Research Institute, and part of the J. Paul Getty Museum
  - Getty Conservation Institute, working internationally to advance conservation practice in cultural heritage
  - Getty Foundation, a grant-awarding body
    - Getty Leadership Institute at Claremont Graduate University, a grantee of the Getty Foundation that provides executive education for museum leaders
  - Getty Research Institute, "dedicated to furthering knowledge and advancing understanding of the visual arts"
    - Art & Architecture Thesaurus, produced by the Getty Research Institute
  - Getty Thesaurus of Geographic Names, a resource of names and information about cities, countries, and other locations and a product of the J. Paul Getty Trust
  - J. Paul Getty Museum, with locations at the Getty Center and Getty Villa
    - Getty Villa, located near Malibu, California, part of the J. Paul Getty Museum, designed as a recreation of the Villa of the Papyri

== Other ==
- getty (Unix), a program that handles the login process when someone logs onto a computer running Unix
- The version of the 1409 fighting manual Fior di Battaglia, is known as the "Getty"

== See also ==
- Gettys
