= David Scarpa =

American screenwriter

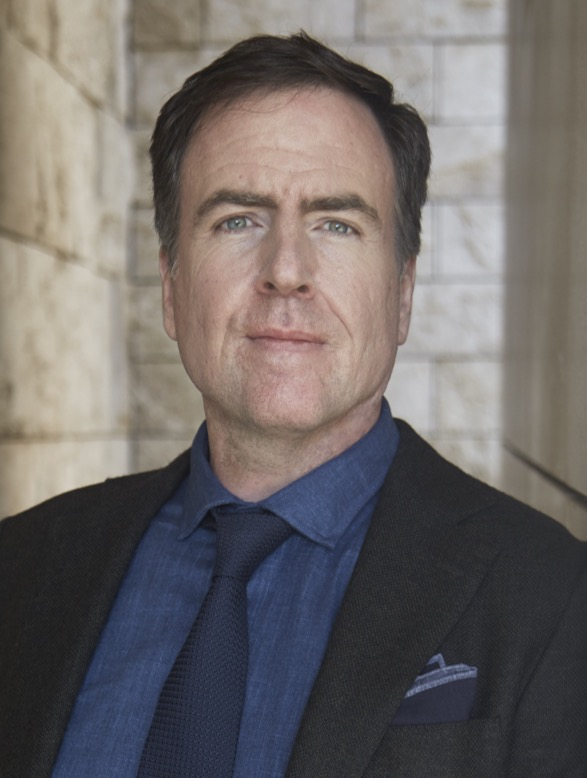
- Scarpa in 2017
- Born: Fort Campbell, Kentucky, United States
- Education: New York University
- Occupation: Screenwriter

David Scarpa is an American screenwriter. He is best known for his collaborations with director Ridley Scott, writing the screenplays for All the Money in the World (2017), about the John Paul Getty III kidnapping, Napoleon (2023), a historical biopic centered on Napoleon Bonaparte, and Gladiator II (2024), a sequel to the 2000 film Gladiator.

== Personal life ==
Scarpa was born in Fort Campbell, Kentucky, and raised in Tennessee and Connecticut before attending New York University's film program.

He resides in Los Angeles, California.

== Career ==
Scarpa began writing features. In 2005, he began developing a remake of The Day the Earth Stood Still. Scarpa felt everything about the original film was still relevant, but changed the allegory from nuclear war to environmental damage because "the specifics of [how] we now have the capability to destroy ourselves have changed." Scarpa noted the recent events of Hurricane Katrina in 2005 informed his mindset when writing the screenplay. He scrapped Klaatu's speech at the conclusion of the story because "audiences today are [un]willing to tolerate that. People don't want to be preached to about the environment. We tried to avoid having our alien looking out over the garbage in the lake and crying a silent tear [from the 1970s Keep America Beautiful ads]." He served as the co-showrunner for Amazon Prime Video series The Man in the High Castle season 4.

After writing All the Money in the World for director Ridley Scott, he reteamed with the director on two more projects: Napoleon, a historical epic centered on Napoleon Bonaparte, and Gladiator II.

=== Upcoming projects ===
In 2017, Scarpa was reported to be writing the screenplay for a movie titled Cleopatra for Sony Pictures Entertainment, with Denis Villeneuve due to direct. In an interview with The Hollywood Reporter, Scarpa described the film as being "a two-hour, lean, mean political thriller, full of assassinations, etc." In 2021 Scarpa was reported to be writing for a HBO miniseries Londongrad, starring Benedict Cumberbatch as Alexander Litvinenko, who died of polonium-210 poisoning in November 2006.

== Writing credits ==
Film

Year	Title	Notes
2001	The Last Castle	Co-written with Graham Yost
2008	The Day the Earth Stood Still	
2017	All the Money in the World	
2023	Napoleon	
2024	Gladiator II	Also story writer with Peter Craig

Television

Year	Title	Notes
2019	The Man in the High Castle	3 episodes; Also executive producer

== Awards and nominations ==
Year	Award	Category	Nominated work	Result	Ref.
2024	77th British Academy Film Awards	Outstanding British Film (shared with Ridley Scott, Mark Huffam, Kevin J. Walsh)	Napoleon	Nominated	
