= Gittis =

Gittis is a surname. Notable people with the surname include:

- Andrew Gittis (born 1998), Canadian curler
- Howard Gittis (1934–2007), American attorney
- Vladimir Gittis (1881–1938), Soviet military commander and komkor

== See also ==
- Gattis
