= John Getty =

John Getty could refer to:

- John Getty (footballer) (1918–?), Scottish footballer
- J. Arch Getty (John Archibald Getty III, 1950–2025), American historian

== See also ==
- John Paul Getty (disambiguation)
