= We Shall See =

1964 British film by Quentin Lawrence

- Directed by: Quentin Lawrence
- Written by: Donal Giltinan
- Based on: novel We Shall See! by Edgar Wallace
- Produced by: Jack Greenwood
- Starring: Maurice Kaufmann; Faith Brook; Alec Mango
- Cinematography: James Wilson
- Edited by: Derek Holding
- Music by: Bernard Ebbinghouse
- Production company: Merton Park Studios
- Distributed by: Anglo-Amalgamated Film Distributors (UK)
- Release date: 1964 (UK)
- Running time: 61 min
- Country: United Kingdom
- Language: English

We Shall See is a 1964 British drama film directed by Quentin Lawrence and starring Maurice Kaufmann, Faith Brook and Alec Mango. It was adapted by Donal Giltinan from the 1926 novel We Shall See! by Edgar Wallace, and was made at Merton Park Studios as part of the long-running series of Edgar Wallace Mysteries.

== Plot ==
Alva, the mentally unbalanced wife of airline pilot Evan Collins, wants her husband to leave his job. However, she is tragically killed when someone throws a hive of bees into her bedroom. Police deduce that whoever was responsible knew that Alva was allergic to the insects. Each member of the household, both relatives and staff, comes under suspicion, as her psychotic behaviour has both alienated and given everyone a personal interest in her demise.

== Cast ==
- Maurice Kaufmann as Evan Collins
- Faith Brook as Alva Collins
- Alec Mango as Ludo
- Alex Macintosh as Greg Thomas
- Hugh Paddick as Connell
- Talitha Pol as Jirina
- Bridget Armstrong as Nurse Rosemary Layton
- William Abney as Shaw
- Donald Morley as Superintendent
- Marianne Stone as Jenny
- David Dodimead as surgeon
- Rosemarie Frankland as waitress
- John Kidd as solicitor
- Stephen Jack as magistrate
- Maxwell Foster as Clerk of the Court

== Critical reception ==
The Monthly Film Bulletin wrote: "A routine but competently managed thriller, quite well acted. The plot works up steadily to the anticipated death of the psychopathic wife by bee-sting, and the introduction of the swarm into her room makes an effective climax. Otherwise not very remarkable."

TV Guide wrote, "Predating The Deadly Bees [1967] by three years, We Shall See is theoretically the first "killer bee" movie," but the reviewer concluded, "The rest of the picture ... is standard crime fare."

SKY Movies observed, "A well-acted Edgar Wallace thriller about a woman who antagonises everyone she meets. She is also very scared of bees ... This difficult central character is strongly acted by Faith Brook. The daughter of Clive Brook, a superstar of both British and Hollywood films in the Twenties and Thirties ... [the director] manages an extremely effective climax as with the help of a few hundred bees and the special effects men."
