= List of current honorary knights and dames of the Order of the British Empire =

This is a list of current honorary knights and dames of the Order of the British Empire.

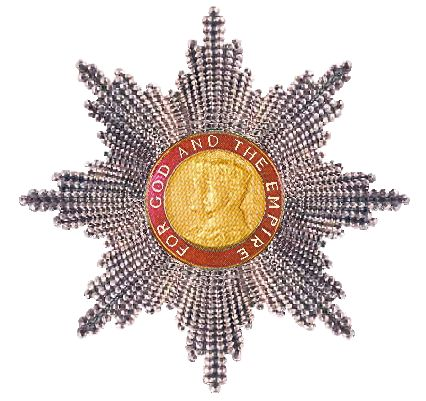
Grand Cross Star of the Order of the British Empire

== Honorary knights and dames ==
=== Grand cross (GBE) ===
Name	Post-nominal	Country	Year appointed
(Jordan) Taher Masri	GBE	Jordan	1988
(Hungary) Zsigmond Járai	GBE	Hungary	1999
(United States) George J. Mitchell	GBE	United States	1999
(Italy) Nicola Mancino	GBE	Italy	2000
(Italy) Luciano Violante	GBE	Italy	2000

=== Commander (KBE/DBE) ===
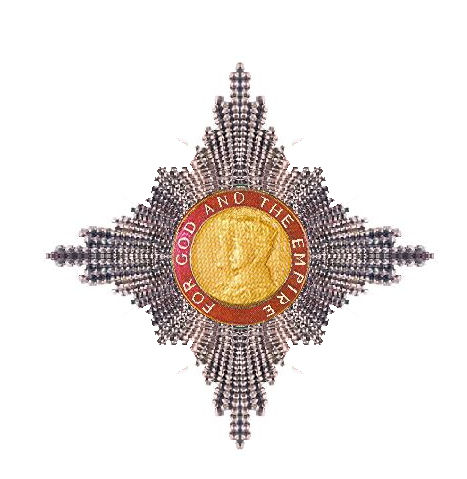
Knight/Dame Commander Star of the Order of the British Empire

Military ranks listed denotes the awarded being in the military division.

Military rank	Name	Post-nominals	Country	Year appointed
	(Tunisia) Mohamed Ennaceur	KBE	Tunisia	1980
	(Jordan) Daoud Hanania	KBE	Jordan	1984
	(Republic of Ireland) Bob Geldof	KBE	Ireland	1986
	(Thailand) Anand Panyarachun	KBE	Thailand	1996
	(Brazil) Clóvis Carvalho	KBE	Brazil	1997
	(Brazil) Teotonio Vilela Filho	KBE	Brazil	1997
	(Brazil) Luiz Carlos Bresser-Pereira	KBE	Brazil	1997
	(Germany) Jürgen Gehrels	KBE	Germany	1997
	(Mozambique) Graça Machel	DBE	Mozambique	1997
	(France) Jacques de Larosière	KBE	France	1998
General	(Germany) Klaus Naumann	KBE	Germany	1998
	(Japan) Nobuhiko Kawamoto	KBE	Japan	1998
	(United States) William J. Perry	KBE	United States	1998
Lieutenant General	(Hungary) Lajos Urban	KBE	Hungary	1999
	(Italy) Bruno Ferrante	KBE	Italy	2000
	(Italy) Francesco Rutelli	KBE	Italy	2000
	(Italy) Gabriele Albertini	KBE	Italy	2000
	(Italy) Giovanna Melandri	DBE	Italy	2000
	(Italy) Riccardo Muti	KBE	Italy	2000
	(Italy) Sergio Mattarella	GCB KBE	Italy	2000
General	(Italy) Mario Arpino	KBE	Italy	2000
	(Italy) Paolo Peluffo	KBE	Italy	2000
Admiral	(Italy) Sergio Biraghi	KBE	Italy	2000
General	(United States) Wesley Clark	KBE	United States	2000
General	(United States) Hugh Shelton	KBE	United States	2001
	(United States) Steven Spielberg	KBE	United States	2001
	(Republic of Ireland) Ann Murray	DBE	Ireland	2002
	(Republic of Ireland) Niall FitzGerald	KBE	Ireland	2002
	(Spain) Plácido Domingo	KBE	Spain	2002
	(United States) Rudy Giuliani	KBE	United States	2002
	(Japan) Hiroshi Kitamura	KBE	Japan	2003
	(Ghana) Sam E. Jonah	KBE	Ghana	2003
	(France) Noël Forgeard	KBE	France	2004
	(France) Bernard Kouchner	KBE	France	2004
	(France) Philippe Douste-Blazy	KBE	France	2004
	(France) Jean-François Lamour	KBE	France	2004
	(France) Dominique Perben	KBE	France	2004
	(France) Gilles de Robien	KBE	France	2004
	(Kuwait) Yusef Abdullah Al-Awadi	KBE	Kuwait	2004
	(Poland) Waldemar Dąbrowski	KBE	Poland	2004
	(South Korea) Han Seung-soo	KBE	South Korea	2004
	(Spain) Esperanza Aguirre	DBE	Spain	2004
	(United States) Murray Perahia	KBE	United States	2004
General	(United States) Tommy Franks	KBE	United States	2004
	(Malta) Lawrence Gonzi	KBE	Malta	2004
	(Japan) Katsuhiko Machida	KBE	Japan	2005
	(United States) Bill Gates	KBE	United States	2005
	(United States) Donald Berwick	KBE	United States	2005
	(Japan) Fujio Cho	KBE	Japan	2006
	(Brazil) Carlos Ghosn	KBE	Brazil	2006
	(Germany) Klaus Schwab	KBE	Germany	2006
Admiral	(United States) Frank Bowman	KBE	United States	2006
	(United States) Franklin Miller	KBE	United States	2006
General	(United States) T. Michael Moseley	KBE	United States	2006
	(Netherlands) Ben Verwaayen	KBE	Netherlands	2007
	(Republic of Ireland) Bono	KBE	Ireland	2007
	(France) Jean-Pierre Garnier	KBE	France	2008
	(India) Arun Sarin	KBE	India	2010
	(Qatar) Moza bint Nasser	DBE	Qatar	2010
	(Argentina) Daniel Barenboim	KBE	Argentina	2011
	(France) Louis Gallois	KBE	France	2011
	(Republic of Ireland) Ray O'Rourke	KBE	Ireland	2011
	(France) Bernard Arnault	KBE	France	2012
	(United States) Mark Pigott	KBE	United States	2012
	(Belgium) Jean Stéphenne	KBE	Belgium	2013
	(Japan) Hisashi Hieda	KBE	Japan	2013
	(South Korea) Choi Mun-kee	KBE	South Korea	2013
	(South Korea) Yoon Sang-jick	KBE	South Korea	2013
	(United Arab Emirates) Lubna Khalid Al Qasimi	DBE	United Arab Emirates	2013
	(United Arab Emirates) Mansour bin Zayed Al Nahyan	KBE	United Arab Emirates	2013
	(United Arab Emirates) Hamed bin Zayed Al Nahyan	KBE	United Arab Emirates	2013
	(United Arab Emirates) Ahmed bin Saeed Al Maktoum	KBE	United Arab Emirates	2013
	(United States) Melinda Gates	DBE	United States	2013
Admiral	(France) Édouard Guillaud	KBE	France	2014
	(Japan) Haruo Naito	KBE	Japan	2014
	(Saudi Arabia) Mohammed Abdul Latif Jameel	KBE	Saudi Arabia	2014
	(United States) Michael Bloomberg	KBE	United States	2014
	(United States) John Franklyn Mars	KBE	United States	2014
	(Austria) Hermann Hauser	KBE	Austria	2015
	(France) Xavier Rolet	KBE	France	2015
	(Republic of Ireland) Mark Getty	KBE	Ireland	2015
	(Republic of Ireland) Martin Naughton	KBE	Ireland	2015
	(Spain) Ana Botín	DBE	Spain	2015
	(Mexico) Aurelio Nuño Mayer	KBE	Mexico	2015
	(Mexico) Claudia Ruiz Massieu	DBE	Mexico	2015
	(Mexico) Emilio Chuayffet	KBE	Mexico	2015
	(Mexico) Pedro Joaquín Coldwell	KBE	Mexico	2015
	(Mexico) Ildefonso Guajardo Villarreal	KBE	Mexico	2015
	(Mexico) Juan José Guerra Abud	KBE	Mexico	2015
	(Mexico) Luis Videgaray Caso	KBE	Mexico	2015
General	(Mexico) Roberto Miranda Moreno	KBE	Mexico	2015
	(United States) Kevin Spacey	KBE	United States	2015
General	(United States) Martin Dempsey	KBE	United States	2016
	(Netherlands) Paul Polman	KBE	Netherlands	2017
	(Republic of Ireland) Pauline Philip	DBE	Ireland	2017
	(United States) Ralph Lauren	KBE	United States	2017
	(Thailand) Vitit Muntarbhorn	KBE	Thailand	2018
	(Netherlands) Alexander Rinnooy Kan	KBE	Netherlands	2018
	(Malaysia) Francis Yeoh	KBE	Malaysia	2019
	(The Gambia) Tumani Corrah	KBE	The Gambia	2019
General	(United States) Joseph Dunford	KBE AO	United States	2020
	(Finland) Esa-Pekka Salonen	KBE	Finland	2020
	(Costa Rica) Christiana Figueres	KBE	Costa Rica	2022
	(United States) Robert Iger	KBE	United States	2022
	(United States) John Williams	KBE	United States	2022
	(Malaysia) Jeffrey Cheah	KBE AO	Malaysia	2023
	(Russia) Vladimir Jurowski	KBE	Russia	2024
	(Singapore) Wei Shen Lim	KBE	Singapore	2024
	(India) Sunil Mittal	KBE	India	2024
	(United States) Stephen A. Schwarzman	KBE	United States	2024
General	(United States) Mark Milley	KBE	United States	2024
	(United States) Dagmar Dolby	DBE	United States	2024
	(United States) Eric Schmidt	KBE	United States	2024
	(Netherlands) Sarina Wiegman	DBE	Netherlands	2025
	(France) Pierre Joxe	KBE	France	?
