= Return from the Ashes =

1965 British film by J. Lee Thompson

- Directed by: J. Lee Thompson
- Written by: Julius J. Epstein
- Based on: novel Le retour des cendres by Hubert Monteilhet
- Produced by: Cecil F. Ford; J. Lee Thompson; Lewis J. Rachmil
- Starring: Maximilian Schell; Ingrid Thulin; Samantha Eggar
- Cinematography: Christopher Challis
- Edited by: Russell Lloyd
- Music by: John Dankworth
- Production companies: Mirisch Corporation; Orchard Productions
- Distributed by: United Artists
- Release date: 19 November 1965
- Running time: 105 minutes
- Country: United Kingdom
- Language: English

Return from the Ashes is a 1965 British thriller film directed by J. Lee Thompson and starring Ingrid Thulin, Maximilian Schell, Samantha Eggar and Herbert Lom. It is based on a novel by French crime writer Hubert Monteilhet, adapted for film by prolific screenwriter Julius J. Epstein.

The novel was also adapted for a second film, the 2014 German Phoenix, written and directed by Christian Petzold. He made multiple changes from the book's elements, focusing on the plot to reclaim an inheritance.

The British film starts shortly before the Battle of France (1940) when chess master Stanislaus Pilgrin and Dr. Michele Wulf, a Jewish woman, have a romantic relationship. They get married, but Michele is sent to a Nazi concentration camp.

Following the end of World War II, Michele is released and attempts to reunite with her husband and her step-daughter Fabi. The two plan to kill Michele and claim her estate. The main theme of the film is attempted uxoricide.

== Plot summary ==
Shortly before the German invasion of France, Dr. Michele Wulf encounters the younger Stanislaus Pilgrin over a game of lightning chess, not being aware that Pilgrin is a chess master. She becomes intrigued with the fortune-hunting Pilgrin and the two begin a liaison. Upon the German invasion, in order to protect Michele, who is Jewish, Stan marries her. But the Gestapo arrests her and sends her to a concentration camp.

Sometime after the war, Michele returns, under the identity of Mme. Robert, and encounters her colleague, plastic surgeon Dr. Charles Bovard. He at first does not recognize her because her face was disfigured in the camp. She has Bovard perform plastic surgery to restore some of her looks.

By chance she encounters Stan, who believes her to have died during the war. Surprised at the resemblance, Stan tells her that Michele's step-daughter Fabi cannot inherit her step-mother's estate because no body was ever produced. He asks "Mme. Robert" to impersonate Michele and she agrees. Upon moving back into her own house, Michele quickly becomes aware that Fabi, now a beautiful woman, resents her for her former neglect. What is worse, the younger woman is now Stan's lover. Eventually, Michele reveals herself and insists on resuming her relationship with her husband.

While taking a bath after consuming alcohol and barbiturates, the jealous Fabi tells Stan her plan for killing her step-mother. Stan will go to another city on the pretext of attending a chess championship. He will set up a gun to go off when Michele opens her safe. After establishing his alibi, he will call her and tell her that he has put a gift for her in the safe. When he hears the shot, he will know she is dead, and he can return home to adjust the scene to make the death appear a suicide.

Though it is not clear if Fabi is serious, the amoral Stan drowns her in the bathtub in such a way that it looks like an accident related to an overdose. Then he carries out her plan in order to gain all the inheritance.

When he returns, he discovers what appears to be Michele's corpse, but is caught by the police in the act of manipulating the scene. Stan tries to flee but is surrounded by the police, Charles, and a very much alive Michele. By way of a flashback, Michele explains how she managed to avoid falling into Stan's trap.

Stan makes light of his situation as he's escorted away by the police officers. He makes a joke about how he's going to face the guillotine because of a simple act by Charles.

== Cast ==
- Ingrid Thulin as Dr. Michele "Mischa" Wolf
- Samantha Eggar as Fabienne Wolf
- Maximilian Schell as Stanislaus Pilgrin
- Herbert Lom as Dr. Charles Bovard
- Talitha Getty as Claudine
- Vladek Sheybal as Paul, chess club manager
- Jacques Cey hotel desk clerk
- Jacques B. Bruniusas 1st detective
- Jean Marc as 2nd detective (dubbed by André Maranne, uncredited)
- Andre Charisse as restaurant captain
- Danièle Noël as nurse
- Arnold Diamond as neighbour
- Viviane Ventura as receptionist

== Original novel ==
The film was based on the novel Le retour des cendres (Phoenix from the Ashes) by Hubert Monteilhet, which was published in 1961. It was published in the United States under the title Return of the Ashes. The Los Angeles Times said if the plot "seems on the surface incredible, the marvel is that Monteilhet brings it off, achieving that suspension of disbelief."

The film softens some of the darkness of the 1961 source novel, Le Retour des cendres. There it is her husband who betrayed her to the Germans and it is the girl, her daughter by a previous husband rather than a stepdaughter, who kills her in the end.

== Production ==
The novel was optioned by Henri-Georges Clouzot, who ended up selling the rights to director J. Lee Thompson, whose films Clouzot admired. In May 1963 Thompson listed the film as among his projects. Samantha Eggar had been under contract to J Lee Thompson who had planned to make a film of The Living Room with her; this movie was made after her appearance in The Collector.

In October 1963 the Mirisch Company announced that the film would be one of six films which the company would make over four months at a total cost of $17 million. The other films were A Shot in the Dark, The Satan Bug, Bandoola, The Confessor, and The Dazzling Hour (which became Kiss Me Stupid). In November Julius Epstein was reportedly working on the script.

In March 1964 Hedda Hopper announced that Sue Lyon would star. Filming was pushed back – in June 1964 the Mirisches said the movie would be part of a slate of 14 films made over 18 months worth $51 million (others including Hawaii, The Hallelujah Trail, The Private Life of Sherlock Holmes, A Rage to Live, Bandoola, The Confessor, The Law and Tombstone, Cast a Giant Shadow, What Did You Do in the War Daddy, A Garden of Cucumbers, Return of the Seven, The Off-Islanders and Richard Sahib).

In November 1964 it was announced the stars would be Maximilian Schell and Gina Lollobrigida. Lollobrigida was replaced by Ingrid Thulin, and sued the production company for $1 million. Samantha Eaggar was under exclusive contract to Thompson's production company.

The film was shot on the backlot of MGM's Elstree Studios. in February 1965. The sets were designed by the art director Michael Stringer. Thompson said he liked to move the camera "to accent the restlessness, the emotional strains of these people, who are highly strung and neurotic. For once, I hope, the camera will help create characters rather than just reflect them."

Thompson says Schell's character "lives by the creed of The Brothers Karamazov. Anything is permissible that is necessary to achieve an end. He does not mean to commit murder."

== Critical reception ==
Variety in its original review said that "Return from the Ashes does not always reach its mark as a thriller... Thompson... establishes a tense mood frequently, but level of interest suffers from character fuzziness which occasionally clouds the issue."
