= August Getty =

American fashion designer (born 1994)

- Born: August Williams; June 23, 1994 (age 32); Los Angeles, California, U.S.
- Occupation: Fashion designer
- Years active: 2014–present
- Parents: Justin Williams (father); Ariadne Getty (mother)
- Relatives: Nats Getty (brother)
- Family: Getty family

August Getty (né Williams; born June 23, 1994) is an American fashion designer and founder of the fashion brand August Getty Atelier.

== Early life and family ==
Getty is the son of Ariadne Getty, a member of the Getty family, and Justin Williams. He is the grandson of Sir John Paul Getty Jr. and the great-grandson of actress Ann Rork Light and Jean Paul Getty, the founder of Getty Oil. He has a sibling, Nats. Getty is of Italian and English heritage. He was homeschooled from the age of 16 until the end of high school.

== Career ==
As a teenager, Getty was influenced by designers Alexander McQueen, Versace, Vivienne Westwood and Stella McCartney. He has also stated that he has a strong connection to Yves Saint Laurent.

In 2014, Getty premiered his 2015 Spring/Summer collection at the Mercedes-Benz fashion show in New York City during New York Fashion Week. The collection was based on childhood fantasies Getty had about European heiresses with secret lives, statues in his family's art collection, and his family's botanical gardens.

In November 2015, Getty collaborated with David LaChappelle for his 2016 Spring/Summer collection called Thread of Man. His collection's debut was an art installation at Universal Studios instead of a traditional fashion show. The installation involved art scenes depicting a car accident, an altar to Our Lady of Guadalupe, and footage of Fox News and U.S. President Donald Trump underneath a neon sign spelling out Hell. His 2016 autumn/winter line appeared in Vogue.

Getty's Spring 2018 collection made its debut at the Four Seasons Hotel in Milan, Italy.

In March 2018, Getty opened a boutique in Beverly Hills, the first for August Getty Atelier.

He has dressed celebrities including Gigi Gorgeous, Kim Kardashian, Paris Hilton, Miley Cyrus, Katy Perry, Bebe Rexha, and Rachel McAdams. Getty consults Gigi Gorgeous, who was married to his brother, as an artistic muse.

== Personal life ==
Getty is openly gay.
