= Nats Getty =

American designer and LGBTQ rights activist (born 1992)

- Born: November 30, 1992 (age 33); Los Angeles, California, U.S.
- Occupations: Model; designer; socialite; activist
- Spouse: Gigi Lazzarato (m. 2019–2025)
- Mother: Ariadne Getty
- Relatives: August Getty (brother)
- Modeling information
- Height: 160 cm (5 ft 3 in)
- Agency: Next Management

Nats Getty (born November 30, 1992) is an American model, socialite, designer, and LGBTQ+ rights activist.

== Early life and family ==
Getty was born in Los Angeles to Ariadne Getty and Justin Williams. He is a member of the Getty family and uses that surname professionally. Getty is the grandchild of Sir John Paul Getty. Getty's maternal great-grandmother was actress Ann Rork Light, and maternal great-grandfather Jean Paul Getty was the founder of Getty Oil. Nats's brother is the fashion designer August Getty. He spent his early childhood in Santa Monica, California, and attended school at The Willows Community School before moving to England at age eight. While living in England, Getty attended a boarding school in Oxford. Raised in the Catholic faith, Getty is the godchild of Gavin Newsom.

== Career ==
Nats, Ariadne and August Getty have worked to provide new infrastructures for the Los Angeles LGBT Center and works closely with GLAAD. Nats has a clothing and lifestyle brand, Strike Oil. The name references the family's oil business.

In 2014, Getty directed and acted in the short film Smoking Solitary, a one-minute film featuring him exhaling cigarette smoke. On July 24, 2017, Getty was interviewed on the podcast series Shane and Friends. Getty arranged for the painting of a Mr. Brainwash mural to honor the 49 victims of the 2016 Orlando nightclub shooting, having it displayed in front of Pulse nightclub. Getty is signed with Next Management and has modeled for his brother, August Getty; August has cited Nats and his wife Gigi Gorgeous as muses.

Nats is an advisor for the Ariadne Getty Foundation, started by his mother, Ariadne.

== Personal life ==
Getty began dating Canadian socialite and YouTuber Gigi Lazzarato, known as Gigi Gorgeous, in 2016 after spending time together during the Paris debut of August Getty's collection.

Getty proposed to Lazzarato in March 2018 at the Château de Vaux-le-Vicomte in France. The couple shared their engagement in a video posted to Lazzarato's YouTube channel. The couple married in July 2019 in a private ceremony at Rosewood Miramar Beach in Montecito, California. Getty filed for divorce from Lazzarato in Los Angeles County Superior Court on July 2, 2025.

Getty initially came out as transgender and non-binary in January 2021 via Instagram, sharing the start of a transition by undergoing a double mastectomy procedure. He came out as a trans man and changed his pronouns to he/him in June 2021.
