= Getty family =

American business and entertainment family

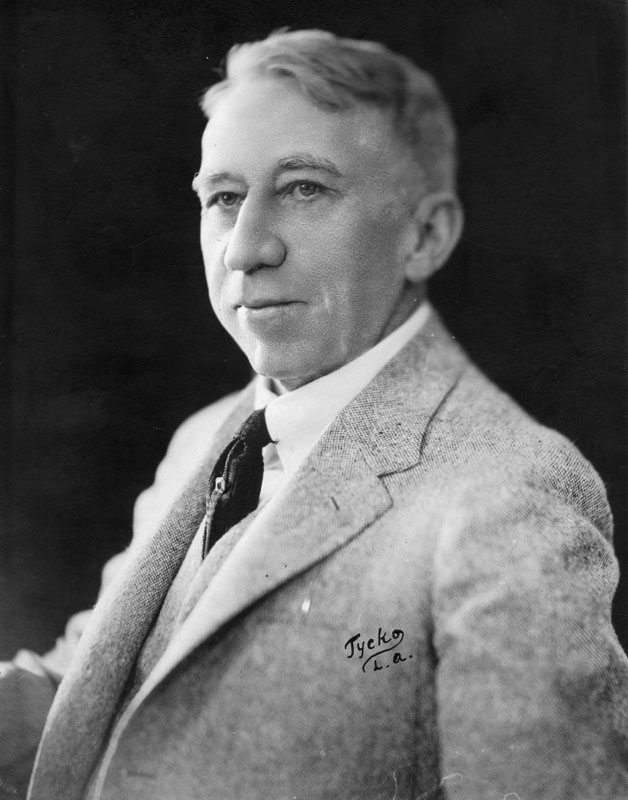
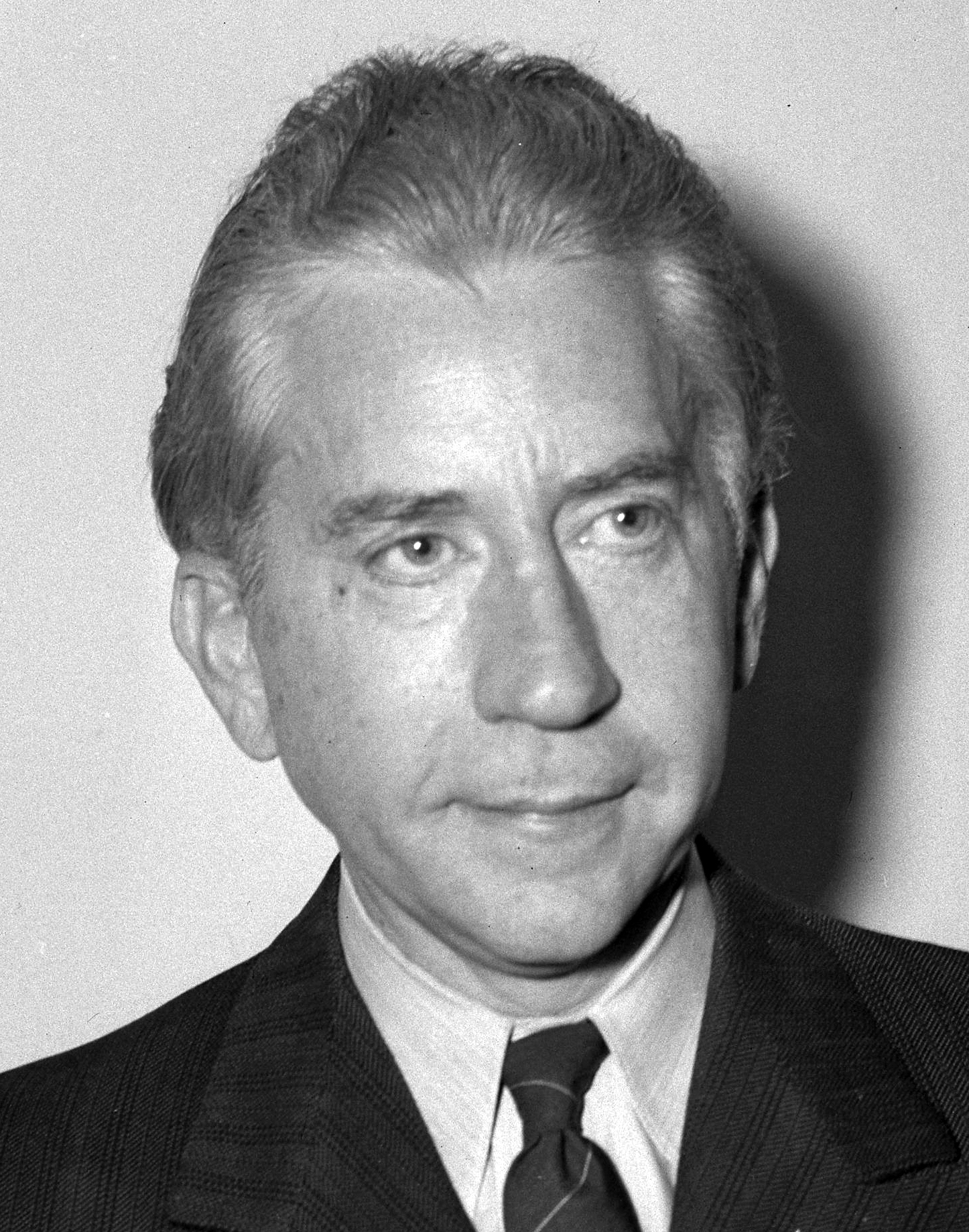
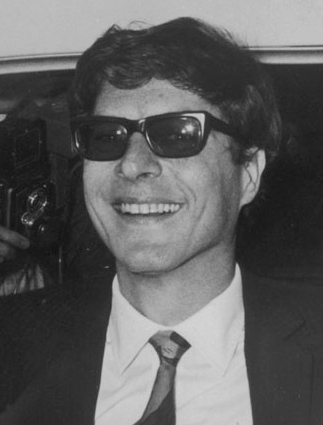
- George Getty J. Paul Getty John Paul Getty Jr.
- Current regions: Los Angeles, California; U.S. London, England; U.K.
- Place of origin: Ireland
- Founded: 18th century
- Founder: John Getty
- Current head: Gordon P. Getty
- Estates: Sutton Place; Temple of Wings; Wormsley Park

The Getty family of the United States began with George Franklin Getty and his son Jean Paul Getty as their patriarchs. In the 20th century, they were heavily involved in the petroleum industry and in mass news media. The Getty family is of Scots-Irish ancestry from their patrilineal lineage, their ancestors having immigrated to North America from Culmore, County Londonderry, Ireland. Several members of the Getty family have lived in England, including Sir Paul Getty, who took British citizenship.

George Getty (1855–1930) was a lawyer who became an independent oilman in 1904. He was married with one son, a daughter having died in infancy in a typhoid epidemic in Minneapolis, Minnesota. He lent his son Jean Paul money to invest in oil wells, and in 1916, George and Jean Paul incorporated the Getty Oil Company.

== Family members ==
The family members include:

- George Getty (1855–1930), American lawyer, married Sarah Catherine McPherson Risher (1853–1941)
  - J. Paul Getty (1892–1976), wealthy American industrialist and founder of Getty Oil, married five times and had five sons:
    1. With his first wife, Jeanette Demont (1904–1986), J. Paul Getty fathered:
    - George Franklin Getty II (1924–1973). George married his first wife, Gloria Gordon, in 1951, and they divorced in 1967. They had three daughters. In 1971, he married his second wife, Jacqueline (Manewal) Riordan.
    2. With his second wife, Allene Gladys Ashby (1909–1970), J. Paul Getty had no children.
    3. With his third wife, Adolphine Helmle (1910–2009), J. Paul Getty fathered:
    - Jean Ronald Getty (1929–2009), who married Karin Seibl in 1964. Their son is:
    - Christopher Ronald Getty (born 1965), who married Pia Miller in 1992. Together, Christopher and Pia had four children, including:
    - Isabel Getty (born 1993).
    4. With his fourth wife, Ann Rork (1908–1988), J. Paul Getty fathered:
    - Sir Paul Getty (1932–2003), born Eugene Paul Getty, also known as John Paul Getty Jr. or II. Sir Paul Getty and Abigail Harris married in 1956 and divorced in 1964. In 1966, Sir Paul married his second wife, Talitha Pol, who died in 1971. He then married Victoria Holdsworth in 1994.
    - John Paul Getty III (1956–2011), born Eugene Paul Getty Jr., was a son of Sir Paul Getty with Abigail Harris. John Paul Getty III married Gisela Martine Zacher in 1974.
    - Anna Getty (born 1972), is the daughter of Gisela Zacher and the adopted daughter of John Paul Getty III.
    - Balthazar Getty (born 1975, as Paul Balthazar Getty), American actor, is the son of Gisela Zacher and John Paul Getty III. Balthazar married Rosetta Millington in 2000, and together they have five children.
    - Aileen Getty (born 1959), a daughter of Sir Paul Getty with Abigail Harris, married Christopher Wilding (son of actors Elizabeth Taylor and Michael Wilding), with whom she had two children. Aileen later married Bartolomeo Ruspoli (son of Alessandro Ruspoli, 9th Prince of Cerveteri).
    - Mark Getty (born 1960, as Mark Harris Getty), founder of Getty Images, is a son of Sir Paul Getty with Abigail Harris. Mark married Domitilla Harding in 1982, and together they had three children, including
    - Alexander Parsifal Getty, who married Tatum Yount in 2012.
    - Joseph Anselm Getty, who married Sabine Ghanem in 2015 and had two children.
    - Ariadne Getty (born 1962), a daughter of Sir Paul Getty with Abigail Harris, married Justin Williams. Their children are:
    - Nats Getty (born 1992 as Natalia Williams), who married Gigi Lazzarato in 2019 and divorced in 2025.
    - August Getty (born 1994 as August Williams), a fashion designer.
    - Tara Gabriel Galaxy Gramophone Getty (born 1968), is a son of Sir Paul Getty with Talitha Pol. He married Jessica Kelly, and they have three children.
    - Gordon Peter Getty (born 1933). Gordon married Ann Gilbert in 1964; she died in 2020. With Gilbert, Gordon Peter Getty had the following five children (plus three others with Cynthia Beck):
    - Gordon Peter Getty Jr. (born 1965), who married Jacqui de la Fontaine in 2000 (div. 2009) and later Shannon Bavaro, in 2016.
    - William Paul Getty (born 1970), who married Vanessa Jarman in 1999.
    - Andrew Rork Getty (1967–2015)
    - John Gilbert Getty (1968–2020) who, with Alyssa Boothby, fathered a daughter
    - Ivy Love Getty (born 1994), who married Tobias Engel in 2020 (div. 2024).
    5. With his fifth wife, Louise Dudley Lynch (1913–2017), J. Paul Getty fathered:
    - Timothy Christopher Ware Getty (1946–1958).

== List of financial holdings ==
The following is a list of businesses in which members of the Getty family have held a controlling or otherwise significant financial interest.

- August Getty Atelier
- Getty Images
- Getty Oil
- Grove Weidenfeld
- The Pierre Hotel
- PlumpJack Winery
- Purplehaus Productions
- ReFlow Management
- Rosetta Getty
- Spartan Aircraft Company
- Strike Oil
