= Marek Gatty-Kostyal =

Polish chemist and pharmacist (1886–1965)

Marek Gatty-Kostyal (born July 20, 1886, in Bochnia – September 13, 1965 in Kraków) was a Polish chemist and pharmacist, known for his many contributions to pharmaceutical science. In 1947 he was made the first dean of the newly-opened Faculty of Pharmacy at the Jagiellonian University Medical College.
