= Harsha Raj Gatty =

Indian activist vocational trainer (born 1987)

- Harsha Raj Gatty at Indian Institute of Public Administration, New Delhi
- Born: 5 May 1987 (age 39); Mangalore, Karnataka, India
- Occupation: Right to Information Act trainer

Harsha Raj Gatty (born 5 May 1987, Mangalore, India) is a Right to Information Act trainer from Mangalore, Karnataka, India. He was born to a Tulu speaking family in Mangalore.

== Personal life ==
Gatty completed his elementary education from Rosario High School, Pandeshwar and higher primary at Canara High School.

Gatty is an alumnus of St. Aloysius College in Mangalore having pursued his post-graduate studies in mass communication and media studies. He has worked for various media organizations including The news minute, The Indian Express. He is the editor of StoryInfinity. He has also worked as a guest faculty in Nitte Institute of Communication.

He was a research fellow on the Right to Information Act conducted by the Department of Personnel and Training and leads vocational training to students and others on how to properly access and use the Act.

== Activism ==
Gatty is a Right to Information trainer from Mangalore. He has cleared his RTI online certificate course conducted by the Department of Personnel and Training, Ministry of Personnel, Public Grievances and Pensions, Government of India.

Gatty found Whitewhistle on 2 May 2011, to create awareness of Right to Information among both public servants and citizens alike. The non-governmental organization not only assists people to file a right to information, but also engages classes on right to information awareness classes for school children as well as to the government officials.

Gatty has been awarded a fellowship on the Right To Information act by the Indian Department of Personnel and Trainings and will be examining the issue of "Lack of adequate capacity on the part of the marginalized groups to utilise the RTI effectively in Dakshina Kannada and Udupi districts".

He took his alma mater St Aloysius College to Court on charges of not awarding degrees that was promised, although the college stated that it was autonomous in nature and could issue such degrees without getting approval from Mangalore University. Gatty won the case.
