= Domitilla Harding =

Italian designer and artist (born 1960)

- Born: 1960 (age 65–66); New York
- Noble family: della Rovere
- Spouse: Mark Getty (1982–2011, divorced)
- Issue: Joseph Getty; Alexander Getty; Julius Getty
- Father: John Harding
- Mother: Lavinia Lante della Rovere
- Occupation: designer, artist

Domitilla Harding (formerly Getty) (born 1960) is an Italian designer and artist.

== Early life ==
Domitilla Harding was born in New York and raised in Rome. She is the daughter of John Harding, publisher, author and screenwriter, and Donna Lavinia Lante della Rovere. Her mother is a member of the House of della Rovere, an Italian noble family with ties to the papacy.

== Career ==
Harding has worked as a furniture designer and as a designer behind the Miss Italy fashion label. The Miss Italy label began as a collection of swimwear for The Cross in west London, in which Harding used recycled fabrics and old textile techniques practiced by traditional Italian artisans and later developed into a fashion brand mixing vintage and modern designs.

Harding works as a glass sculptor with glass master Andrea Zilio at the Anfora foundry in Murano, creating glass vessels, vases, and sculptures. Her work has been showcased in various museums, shops, and galleries. In 2013, Harding's work was shown in the Wood Glass Paper exhibition at the Alessandra Bonomo Gallery in Rome. In 2015 she exhibited nine glass sculptures at the Arte Del Vetro Oggi In Italia at Villa Necchi Campiglio in Milan, sponsored by Fondo Ambiente Italiano. Her work has also been shown at Marie Rose Kahane's studio Yali, Villa Dei Vescovi, Murano Oggi, Emozione di Vetro, and the Fondazione Musei Civici di Venezia.

== Personal life ==
Harding married Mark Getty, grandson of J. Paul Getty and heir to the Getty family, in 1982 at the Basilica of the Twelve Apostles in Rome. They have three sons: Joseph, Alexander, and Julius. In 1985, the couple purchased an abandoned hamlet near Orgia in the provincia of Siena, and began restoring it. Harding and Getty separated in 2010 and divorced in 2011. After their divorce, Harding relocated from their home at Wormsley Park to Tuscany.
