= Gettys =

Gettys is an anglicised Irish-language surname, a variant of Getty. Notable people with the surname include:

- Jim Gettys (born 1953), American computer programmer
- Michael Gettys (born 1995), American baseball player
- Reid Gettys (born 1963), American basketball player and lawyer
- Samuel Gettys (fl. 1780s), American settler and tavern owner, founder of Gettysburg, Pennsylvania
- Thomas S. Gettys (1912–2003), American politician, U.S. Representative from South Carolina
