= All the Money in the World =

2017 biographical crime thriller film by Ridley Scott

- Theatrical release poster
- Directed by: Ridley Scott
- Written by: David Scarpa
- Based on: Painfully Rich: The Outrageous Fortunes and Misfortunes of the Heirs of J. Paul Getty by John Pearson
- Produced by: Dan Friedkin; Bradley Thomas; Quentin Curtis; Chris Clark; Ridley Scott; Mark Huffam; Kevin J. Walsh
- Starring: Michelle Williams; Christopher Plummer; Mark Wahlberg; Romain Duris
- Cinematography: Dariusz Wolski
- Edited by: Claire Simpson
- Music by: Daniel Pemberton
- Production companies: TriStar Pictures; Imperative Entertainment; Scott Free Productions; RedRum Films
- Distributed by: Sony Pictures Releasing (North America and United Kingdom); STX International (International)
- Release dates: December 18, 2017 (Samuel Goldwyn Theater); December 25, 2017 (United States); January 5, 2018 (United Kingdom)
- Running time: 135 minutes
- Countries: United States; United Kingdom
- Language: English
- Budget: $50 million
- Box office: $57 million

All the Money in the World is a 2017 biographical crime thriller film directed by Ridley Scott and written by David Scarpa. Based on John Pearson's 1995 book Painfully Rich: The Outrageous Fortunes and Misfortunes of the Heirs of J. Paul Getty, it depicts the events surrounding the 1973 kidnapping of John Paul Getty III and the refusal of his grandfather, the multi-billionaire oil tycoon J. Paul Getty, to cooperate with the kidnappers' extortion demands. The film stars Michelle Williams as Gail Harris Getty, John Paul Getty III's mother; Christopher Plummer as J. Paul Getty; and Mark Wahlberg as Fletcher Chace, an adviser of the Getty family.

Principal photography began in March 2017 and was completed in August for a December 8 release. Two months before the scheduled premiere, sexual misconduct allegations were made against J. Paul Getty's original actor Kevin Spacey, leading to his removal from the film. Plummer was cast by November and 22 scenes were reshot within eight days, one month prior to the rescheduled Christmas release date. It was later reported that Wahlberg was paid $1.5 million for the reshoots, while Williams was only paid $1,000, which sparked a debate on the gender pay gap in Hollywood.

The film premiered at the Samuel Goldwyn Theater in Beverly Hills on December 18, 2017, followed by a United States theatrical release by TriStar Pictures on December 25. It received generally favorable reviews, many of which praised the performances, and grossed only $57 million against a $50 million budget. Plummer received particular acclaim, and he was nominated for the Academy Award for Best Supporting Actor for his work in the film.

== Plot ==
In 1973, 16-year-old John Paul Getty III, grandson of the world's richest private citizen, oil tycoon J. Paul Getty, is kidnapped in Rome, where he lives, by the 'Ndrangheta, a Mafia-like organized crime group based in Calabria. A ransom of $17 million is demanded, but Paul's mother, Gail Harris Getty, is unable to pay it, as she rejected any alimony in exchange for full custody of her children when she divorced Paul's father, John Paul Getty Jr., in 1971 (Note: In reality, Abigail Harris and John Paul Getty Jr. were divorced in 1964.) due to his drug addiction. She travels to Getty's estate in England to beseech him to provide the money, but he refuses, stating that doing so would encourage further kidnappings of his family members, and instead asks Fletcher Chace, a Getty Oil negotiator and former CIA operative, to investigate the case and secure Paul's release. The media quickly picks up on the story, and Gail is constantly hounded by paparazzi.

Paul is kept hostage in a remote location in southern Italy. Initially, his captors, particularly Cinquanta, do not treat him overly harshly, as he causes them few problems, but as months go by without the ransom being paid, far longer than the captors anticipated, the situation grows increasingly tense. One of the kidnappers accidentally shows his face to Paul, but, before he can kill Paul so he cannot be identified, another kidnapper shoots him dead. His burned and disfigured body is found in the sea, and, at first, investigators think it is Paul. Gail is brought in to identify her son, but immediately sees that the corpse is not him.

Once they determine the correct identity of the body, the Carabinieri are able to determine where Paul is being held. A raid is conducted, during the course of which all of the kidnappers who are present are killed, but Paul is not found, as he has been sold to a different 'ndrina, or crime family, who hire Cinquanta to keep looking after Paul and negotiating with Gail. Paul's new captors are much less patient, and more ruthless, than his former ones, and, after he almost escapes, they cut off one of his ears and mail it to a newspaper, claiming they will continue mutilating the boy until the ransom is paid.

After repeated negotiations between the captors and Gail and Chace, the ransom is lowered to $4 million. Getty finally agrees to pay, but only if Gail signs over full custody of all of her children to their father, who is in a near-vegetative state due to his drug use. Knowing she is really giving custody to Getty, Gail signs the documents, but Getty only provides $1 million, as it is the maximum amount his lawyers can figure out a way to claim as tax-deductible. Gail announces she has the full ransom, hoping she and Chace can figure out a way to get Paul back alive anyway, and the desperation of this, coupled with a biting resignation speech given by Chace, unintentionally convince Getty to provide the full ransom and give Gail back the custody of her children.

Following precise instructions from the captors, Gail and Chace leave the money in a remote location and, once it is counted, receive a call to pick up Paul from a construction site. Based on advice from Cinquanta, Paul has run away, so Gail and Chace begin to search for him. The captors also begin to search for Paul, intending to kill him, after they discover Chace broke his word by leading the police to them. Everyone converges on the nearby town of Lauria after dark, and some of the criminals are arrested, but one of them finds Paul. Cinquanta attacks the man to allow Paul to escape, and Paul is reunited with Gail and brought to safety.

When Getty dies in 1976, Gail is tasked with managing her children's inherited wealth until they are adults. Getty's estate was set up as a charitable trust, which allowed him to avoid paying taxes, but also meant he could not spend his income. He could invest it, however, and amassed an enormous collection of paintings, sculptures, and other artifacts, most of which now reside in the J. Paul Getty Museum in Los Angeles.

== Cast ==
- Michelle Williams as Gail Harris, Getty III's mother, Getty Jr.'s ex-wife, and Getty's ex-daughter-in-law
- Christopher Plummer as J. Paul Getty, Getty III's grandfather, Getty Jr.'s father, and Harris' ex-father-in-law
- Mark Wahlberg as James Fletcher Chace, Getty's security adviser, Gail's ally, and a former-CIA operative
- Romain Duris as Dante "Cinquanta" Agnana, one of Getty III's abductors
- Timothy Hutton as Oswald Hinge, Getty's attorney
- Charlie Plummer as John Paul Getty III, Gail and Getty Jr.'s son and Getty's grandson
  - Charlie Shotwell as John Paul Getty III (age 7)
- Andrew Buchan as John Paul Getty Jr., who is Getty's son, Getty III's father, and Gail's ex-husband
- Marco Leonardi as Saverio Mammoliti, the Capobastone of the 'Ndrangheta's Mammoliti 'ndrina, who is one of Getty III's captors and becomes Cinquanta's boss
- Giuseppe Bonifati as Giovanni Iacovoni, Gail's attorney
- Nicolas Vaporidis as Ettore "Il Tamia" ("Chipmunk") Pazzano, one of Getty III's abductors
- Andrea Piedimonte as Magistrate Corvo of the Carabinieri, the lead investigator of Getty III's kidnapping
- Guglielmo Favilla as Piccolino, one of Getty III's abductors
- Stacy Martin as Nancy, Getty's secretary
- Clive Wood as Bullimore, Getty's butler
- Ghassan Massoud as Prince Al-Rashid
- Bakar Qabbani as Prince Al-Walid
- Lorenzo Pedrotti as Communist #1
- Rachele Studer as Communist #2
- Olivia Magnani as Factory Woman, who oversees Mammoliti's finances
- Giampiero Judica as Sgrò, one of Mammoliti's senior henchmen
- Rainer Sellien as Otto Lam, who sells Getty a painting
- Maurizio Lombardi as Mammoliti's Doctor, who operates on Getty III
- Fabio Farronato as Constable, who finds Getty III limping down the road
- Valeria Vaiano as Constable's Wife
- Mario Opinato as Sotheby's Appraiser
- Matteo Carlomagno as Newspaper Editor

== Production ==
=== Development and pre-production ===
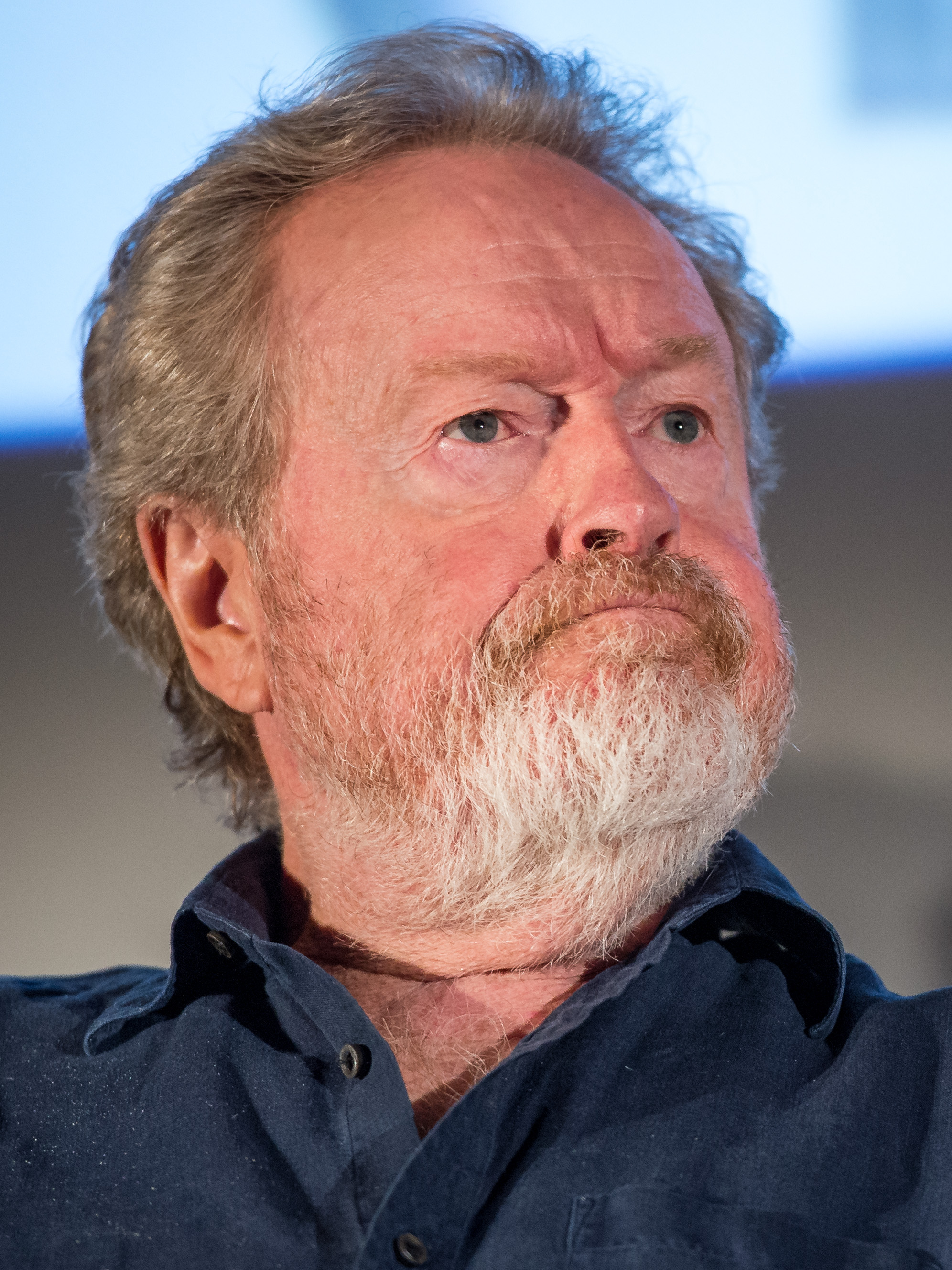
Director Scott in 2015

On March 13, 2017, it was reported that Ridley Scott was finalizing plans to direct the David Scarpa-scripted All the Money in the World, a film about the kidnapping of John Paul Getty III. Scott stated he was attracted to the project because of Scarpa's script, adding: "I just consumed it [...] I knew about the kidnapping, but this story was very, very provocative... Gail Getty was an exceptional character, and there are many facets of the man Getty that make him a really great study. There's this great dynamic. It was like a play, and not a movie."

Natalie Portman was pursued for the role of Gail Harris at one point, but, on March 31, 2017, it was reported that Michelle Williams and Kevin Spacey were circling the roles of Harris and J. Paul Getty, respectively, while Mark Wahlberg was in talks for an unspecified role. On casting Spacey, Scott stated: "When I read the script, I started thinking, 'Who was Paul Getty?' In my mind, I saw Kevin Spacey. Kevin's a brilliant actor, but I've never worked with him, and I always knew I would have to have him portray Getty in this film [...] He was so obsessed with what he was doing [...] He wasn't giving people a second thought." Regarding Williams, Scott stated that, while she was not his first choice, "Michelle is very special as an actress, and I've never done anything with her before [...] The family was very private and there was very little footage of [Gail], but around the kidnapping, there was one particular interview she did that Michelle jumped at, and it shows Gail Getty being very assertive, very smart," both qualities Williams possessed. Charlie Plummer joined the cast as John Paul Getty III on May 2, and Timothy Hutton was cast on June 16.

=== Initial filming ===
It was reported on May 31, 2017, that the film had already begun principal photography. At the end of July, a week of filming took place at Elveden Hall in Suffolk, with the aristocratic, Grade II-listed stately home doubling as a Moroccan palace in a series of flashback scenes. Production reportedly concluded in August.

=== Recasting of J. Paul Getty and reshoots ===

Kevin Spacey (top) as J. Paul Getty in a screenshot released from the film, before his scenes in the role were re-shot with Christopher Plummer (bottom)

In late October 2017, numerous sexual misconduct allegations were made against Kevin Spacey. The film's premiere at the AFI Fest on November 16 was canceled, and its Academy Awards campaign—which was initially to center on Spacey's supporting role—was reworked.

On November 9, it was announced that, although the film was otherwise ready for release, reshoots had been scheduled so Christopher Plummer could replace Spacey in the role of Getty. Despite his earlier statements to the contrary, at this point Scott claimed Plummer was his original choice for the role, but studio executives had persuaded him to cast the "bigger name" Spacey.

Spacey had worked on the film for 10 days, and the reshoots with Plummer lasted from November 20 to 29, with the first footage of Plummer in the role released the same day they concluded. The only shot in the finished film that features Spacey is a wide shot of Getty disembarking from a train in the desert, as it would have been too expensive or complex to reshoot before the deadline, but Spacey's face is not visible. The reshoots cost $10 million, bringing the film's final production budget to $50 million.

While it was initially reported that the actors filmed the reshoots for free, it was later revealed that Wahlberg had been paid $1.5 million, while Williams received only $80 in per diems. Wahlberg's fee for the original shooting was allegedly $5 million, whereas Williams' fee was allegedly $625,000. The New York Times reported that Wahlberg accepted 80 percent less than his usual fee to work on this film, and the $1.5 million he received for the reshoots was in addition to this. USA Today reported that Wahlberg was able to command the additional fee by refusing to agree to Plummer's casting until he was guaranteed the extra pay, as there was a clause in his contract that gave him approval of his co-stars. As a result of the backlash brought on by the disparity in the actors' pay, Wahlberg announced he would donate the $1.5 million to the Time's Up Legal Defense Fund in Williams' name.

== Release ==
The film premiered at the Samuel Goldwyn Theater in Beverly Hills, California, on December 18, 2017. In the United States, it was set to be released on December 8 and 22, but, two weeks before its debut, it was pushed to December 25 to avoid competition with Star Wars: The Last Jedi. It was released on digital home video platforms on March 27, 2018, and on DVD and Blu-ray on April 10.

== Reception ==
=== Box office ===
All the Money in the World grossed $25.1 million in the United States and Canada and $31.8 million in other territories, for a worldwide total of $56.9 million against a production budget of $50 million.

On Christmas Day, the film's opening day in the United States, it grossed $2.6 million from 2,068 theaters. Its first full weekend, the film made $5.4 million from 2,074 theaters, finishing 7th at the box office. The following weekend, the film made $3.6 million, a drop of 36%, and finished 10th at the box office.

=== Critical response ===
On the review aggregator website Rotten Tomatoes, 79% of 260 critics' reviews are positive. The website's consensus reads: "All the Money in the World offers an absorbing portrayal of a true story, brought compellingly to life by a powerful performance from Christopher Plummer." Metacritic, which uses a weighted average, assigned the film a score of 72 out of 100, based on 47 critics, indicating "generally favorable" reviews. Audiences polled by CinemaScore gave the film an average grade of "B" on an A+ to F scale.

Todd McCarthy of The Hollywood Reporter called the film "a terrifically dexterous and detailed thriller about the Italian mob's 1973 kidnapping for ransom of the grandson of the world's richest man, John Paul Getty [sic]." Matt Zoller Seitz of RogerEbert.com gave the film three out of four stars and commended it as a whole, but criticized the middle section as repetitive. He also praised Scott for being able to finish the film despite the Spacey controversy, calling it "a testament to the awesome work ethic of its 80-year old but still apparently tireless director". Peter Bradshaw of The Guardian gave the film four out of five stars, reserving his greatest praise for Plummer, who, he said, "doesn’t look like a hasty replacement. He relishes and luxuriates in the role. It fits him perfectly." Writing for Vulture, David Edelstein praised "the marvelous performance of Michelle Williams as Gail. It's a real transformation."

=== Accolades ===
Award	Date of ceremony	Category	Recipient(s)	Result	Ref.
AARP's Movies for Grownups Awards	February 5, 2018	Best Supporting Actor	Christopher Plummer	Nominated	
AARP's Movies for Grownups Awards	February 5, 2018	Best Director	Ridley Scott	Nominated	
Academy Awards	March 4, 2018	Best Supporting Actor	Christopher Plummer	Nominated	
British Academy Film Awards	February 18, 2018	Best Actor in a Supporting Role	Christopher Plummer	Nominated	
Golden Globe Awards	January 7, 2018	Best Actress in a Motion Picture – Drama	Michelle Williams	Nominated	
Golden Globe Awards	January 7, 2018	Best Director – Motion Picture	Ridley Scott	Nominated	
Golden Globe Awards	January 7, 2018	Best Supporting Actor – Motion Picture	Christopher Plummer	Nominated	
Location Managers Guild Awards	April 7, 2018	Outstanding Locations in Period Film	Steve Mortimore and Enrico Latella	Nominated	

== See also ==
- Trust, a 2018 FX television series that also depicts the kidnapping, starring Donald Sutherland as J. Paul Getty, Hilary Swank as Gail Getty, and Brendan Fraser as James Fletcher Chace.
