= John Getty (footballer) =

Scottish footballer (born 1918)

Personal information
- Full name: John Getty
- Date of birth: 23 April 1918
- Place of birth: Bonhill, Scotland
- Height: 5 ft 9 in (1.75 m)
- Position: Outside right

Youth career
- Ashfield

Senior career*
Years	Team	Apps	(Gls)
1936–1937	Nottingham Forest		
1939–1940	Dumbarton	5	(0)
- * Club domestic league appearances and goals

John Getty (born 23 April 1918, date of death unknown) was a Scottish footballer who played for Dumbarton and Nottingham Forest. Getty is deceased.
