= Gattis =

Gattis is a surname. Notable people with the surname include:

- Dan Gattis (born 1967), American politician
- Evan Gattis (born 1986), American baseball player
- Josh Gattis (born 1984), American football player
- Keith Gattis (1970–2023), American country music artist
- Lynn Gattis (born 1957), American politician

== See also ==
- Gatti's, a Southeastern United States pizza-buffet chain
- Mark Gatiss, English actor and writer
