= John Paul Getty III =

American Getty heir and kidnap victim (1956–2011)

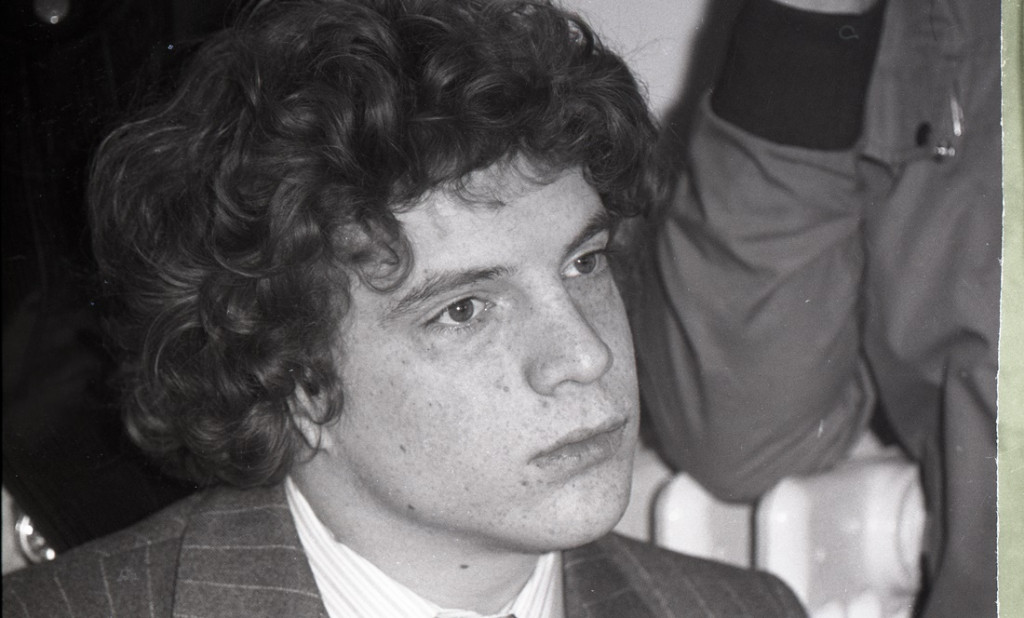
- Getty in 1976
- Born: Eugene Paul Getty II; November 4, 1956; Minneapolis, Minnesota, U.S.
- Died: February 5, 2011 (aged 54); Wormsley Park, Buckinghamshire, England
- Known for: Grandson of J. Paul Getty; victim of kidnapping
- Spouse: Gisela Schmidt (m. 1974; div. 1993)
- Children: Balthazar Getty
- Father: John Paul Getty Jr.
- Family: Getty family

John Paul Getty III (/ˈɡɛti/; born Eugene Paul Getty II; November 4, 1956 – February 5, 2011) was a grandson of the American oil tycoon J. Paul Getty, who was once the richest man in the world. While living in Rome in 1973, he was kidnapped by the 'Ndrangheta, an Italian criminal organization based in Calabria, and held for a $17 million ransom. His grandfather initially refused to pay, but, after John Paul Getty III's severed ear was received by a newspaper, his grandfather relented to a new, lower demand, and Getty was released five months after being kidnapped. Getty subsequently developed an addiction to alcohol and other drugs, leading to an overdose and stroke in 1981 at the age of 25, which left him severely disabled for the rest of his life.

== Early life ==
Getty was born in Minneapolis, Minnesota as eldest of four children of John Paul Getty Jr. and Abigail "Gail" Harris. He spent most of his childhood in Rome while his father headed the Italian division of the Getty family oil business. His parents divorced in 1964 when he was eight years old, and his father married Dutch model and actress Talitha Pol in 1966. The couple adopted a hippie lifestyle, spending much time in Britain and Morocco during the 1960s. Getty remained in Italy with his mother Gail and attended St. George's British International School in Rome.

In July 1971, his stepmother died of an alleged heroin overdose in Rome and his father moved back to the United Kingdom, partly to escape charges of drug possession which he was facing in Italy. In early 1972, Getty was expelled from St. George's after painting offensive six-foot-high wording in a hallway of the school, aimed at the school's headmaster. Getty remained in Italy where he lived a bohemian lifestyle, living in a squat, frequenting nightclubs and taking part in left-wing demonstrations. He had considerable artistic talent and reportedly earned a living making jewelry, selling his paintings and cartoons, and appearing in movies as an extra. The Italian adult magazine Playmen paid him $1,000 to appear naked in a spread and on the cover of its August 1973 issue, released a month after he was kidnapped.

== Kidnapping ==
Getty was kidnapped in the Piazza Farnese in Rome at 3 a.m. on July 10, 1973, when he was 16. According to his girlfriend Gisela Schmidt, he had toyed with the idea of having himself "kidnapped" by petty criminals when the couple was struggling to make ends meet, but changed his mind when both began working as models for photographers. She stated that "Paul didn't want to be kidnapped anymore, but the kidnappers continued following him." He was blindfolded, transported, and imprisoned in a cave in Calabria. The kidnappers issued a ransom note demanding $17 million (equivalent to $123 million in 2025) for his safe return. However, the family suspected a plot by the rebellious teenager to extract money from his grandfather.

John Paul Getty Jr. asked his father J. Paul Getty for the money, but the latter refused, arguing that his 13 other grandchildren might become kidnap targets if he paid. The kidnappers sent a second demand, but its arrival was delayed by an Italian postal strike. As time wore on, Paul's treatment by his captors grew worse: they took away his radio, killed a bird he had taken as a pet, and began playing Russian roulette against his head.

In November 1973, a daily newspaper received an envelope containing a lock of hair, a human ear, and a threat from the kidnappers to mutilate Paul further unless they were paid $3.2 million (equivalent to $23.2 million in 2025). The letter read, "This is Paul's first ear. If within ten days the family still believes that this is a joke mounted by him, then the other ear will arrive. In other words, he will arrive in little bits." Paul's health declined rapidly as his ear wound became infected, combined with pneumonia. His captors were alarmed at this sudden decline and gave him large doses of penicillin to treat the infection, which caused him to develop an allergy to the antibiotic and further affected his health. Getty's biographer John Pearson attributed his later alcoholism to the large amounts of brandy that he was plied with in the last few months of his captivity to keep him warm and numb his pain.

After Paul's ear was received his grandfather agreed to pay no more than $2.2 million, the maximum amount that was tax deductible, and lent the remainder to his son at a four percent rate of interest. Paul was found alive on December 15, 1973 in a petrol station of Lauria in the province of Potenza shortly after the ransom was paid. At his mother's suggestion, he called his grandfather to thank him for paying the ransom, but J. Paul Getty refused to come to the phone.

Nine kidnappers were apprehended, including Girolamo Piromalli and Saverio Mammoliti, high-ranking members of the 'Ndrangheta, an Italian criminal organization based in Calabria. Two kidnappers were convicted and sent to prison. The others were acquitted for lack of evidence, including the 'Ndrangheta bosses. Most of the ransom money was never recovered. In 1977, Getty had plastic surgery to rebuild the ear that his kidnappers had severed.

== Later life and death ==
In 1974, Getty married Gisela Martine Zacher (née Schmidt), who was five months pregnant. He had known her and her twin sister Jutta since before his kidnapping. He was 18 years old when his son Balthazar was born in 1975. The couple divorced in 1993. Gisela's daughter, Anna Getty (née Zacher), was adopted by Getty III during marriage.

Getty acted in some European films, playing supporting parts in Raúl Ruiz's The Territory (1981) and in Wim Wenders's The State of Things (1982). He and his wife lived for a time in New York City where they consorted with Andy Warhol's art crowd.

Getty was permanently affected by his kidnapping and suffered from alcoholism and addictions to other drugs during the years that followed. In 1981, he drank a Valium, methadone, and alcohol cocktail which caused liver failure and a stroke, leaving him quadriplegic, partially blind, and unable to speak. Afterwards, his mother cared for him, and she sued his father for $28,000 a month to cover his medical needs. He never fully recovered and remained severely disabled for the rest of his life. By 1987, he had regained some degree of autonomy and was able to ski when strapped to a metal frame.

In 1999, Getty and several other members of his family became citizens of the Republic of Ireland in return for investments of approximately £1 million each under a law which has since been repealed.

Getty died at his father's estate at Wormsley Park, Buckinghamshire, on February 5, 2011, aged 54, following a long illness. He had been in poor health since his 1981 drug overdose.

== Media ==
A. J. Quinnell used Getty's kidnapping as one piece of inspiration for his book Man on Fire.

The 1995 book Painfully Rich: the Outrageous Fortunes and Misfortunes of the Heirs of J. Paul Getty by John Pearson includes significant content on Getty's kidnapping ordeal.

The story of Getty's kidnapping was adapted to the 2017 film All the Money in the World, directed by Ridley Scott. The film used the book by Pearson as its source. In the film, J. Paul Getty is played by Christopher Plummer and John Paul Getty III is played by Charlie Plummer (no relation) as a teenager and Charlie Shotwell at age 7.

The story of the kidnapping was also adapted into the 2018 television series Trust, produced by Simon Beaufoy and Danny Boyle, with Harris Dickinson as John Paul Getty III and Donald Sutherland as J. Paul Getty.

Shriekback's song, "Over the Wire", includes lyrics related to Getty III's kidnapping; “Then John Paul Getty in the form of a dove / Says you only ever answer to the Butcher of Love.”

== See also ==
- List of kidnappings
- List of richest Americans in history
- List of solved missing person cases (1970s)
- List of victims of the 'Ndrangheta
- Years of Lead
