= Wormsley Park =

Country house in Buckinghamshire, England

Coordinates: 51.6447°N 0.9342°W

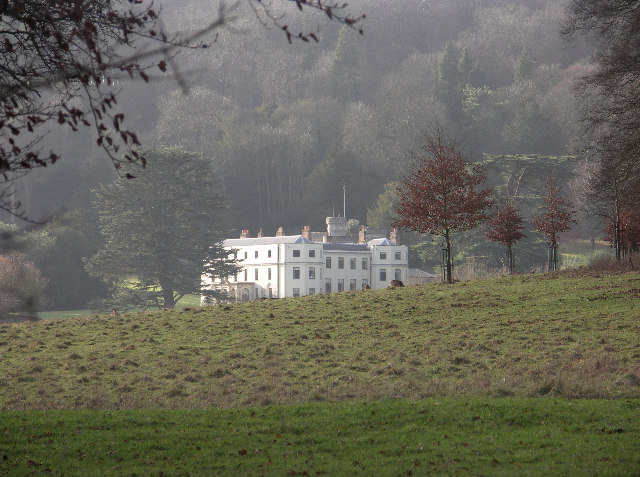
Wormsley

Wormsley is a private estate of Mark Getty and his family, set in 2,700-acre (1,100 ha) of rolling countryside in the Chiltern Hills of Buckinghamshire (formerly Oxfordshire), England. Acquired by Sir Paul Getty in 1985, the estate forms part of Hambleden valley, running from Stokenchurch to Turville. Wormsley is known for its library, its cricket ground, its two-acre walled garden, its shoot, and the vistas and landscapes of the estate grounds.

The estate rents space for events and television and filming work, and is also the home of Garsington Opera.

== History ==
The estate was founded by the Scrope family in the late 16th century. It belonged to Colonel Adrian Scrope, the regicide, and passed to his grandson John Scrope, a baron of the Exchequer who died without issue. The estate passed to the descendants of his sister Anne (died 1721), who had married Henry Fane of Brympton. Their second son, Thomas Fane, also a Bristol merchant, succeeded his uncle as Member of Parliament for Lyme Regis, beginning the Fane family's long association with the seat. Fane also succeeded a distant cousin and became 8th Earl of Westmoreland in 1762.

The Fane family sold the 18th-century house and estate in 1986 to Sir Paul Getty and his wife Victoria Holdsworth. Getty restored the house and estate, adding a library to accommodate his book collection, and a theatre where performances were held for invited guests.

The area is known for its population of red kites. Once extinct in England and Scotland, the birds were reintroduced into England beginning in 1989. The area was not originally planned to be the first release site. It was originally intended to be Windsor Great Park, but at the last minute the landowner pulled out and the project nearly collapsed. Getty stepped in and offered Wormsley as an alternative.

In 2011, Garsington Opera moved from Garsington Manor near Oxford to a purpose-built pavilion in the grounds of Wormsley.

== Cricket ground ==
Sir Paul Getty's Ground
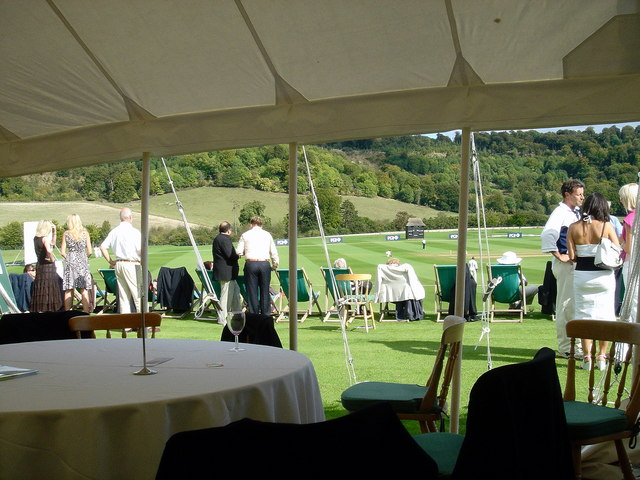
- Interactive map of Sir Paul Getty's Ground

Ground information
- Location: near Stokenchurch, Buckinghamshire
- Country: England
- Establishment: 1992 (first recorded match)
- Capacity: 5,000

International information
- First women's Test: 11–15 August 2013: England v Australia
- Last women's Test: 13–17 August 2014: England v India
- First women's ODI: 5 July 2009: England v Australia
- Last women's ODI: 11 July 2012: England v India

Team information
Unicorns	(2010–2013)
Buckinghamshire	(1999–2005)
- As of 5 September 2020; Source: cricketarchive.com

After Mick Jagger introduced him to cricket, Getty built a ground in 1992 with a mock-Tudor pavilion. The actual playing area is a replica of the field at The Oval. The Queen Mother and the Prime Minister, John Major, attended the first match, along with Michael Caine, Denis Compton and Brian Johnston. Over the final decade of his life, Getty invited teams to play at what is now known as "Sir Paul Getty's Ground" with the teams ranging from world-class sides to youth sides.

Those who have played there include cricketers Andrew Flintoff, Imran Khan, Mike Gatting, Mike Atherton, Mark Ramprakash, Derek Randall, James Anderson and Mike Brearley and entertainment figures such as Peter O'Toole, Tim Rice, and Rory Bremner. Touring international sides have played at Wormsley with the Australians, West Indians, Sri Lankans and South Africans all having made appearances at the ground. It was the venue for the only Test match of the Australian women's tour of England in 2013.
