= Talitha Getty =

Dutch actress (1940–1971)

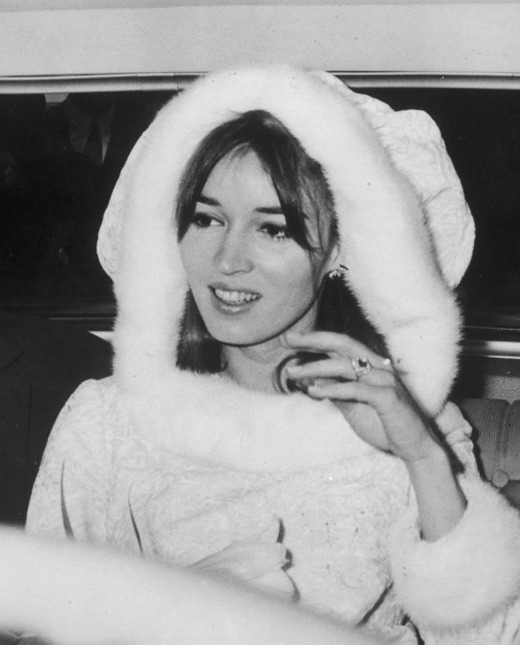
- Getty in December 1966
- Born: Talitha Dina Pol; 18 October 1940; Mojokerto, Java, Dutch East Indies
- Died: 11 July 1971 (aged 30); Rome, Italy
- Occupations: Actress; socialite; model
- Spouse: John Paul Getty Jr. (m. 1966)
- Children: 1

Talitha Dina Getty (née Pol; 18 October 1940 – 11 July 1971) was a Dutch actress, socialite, and model who was regarded as a style icon of the late 1960s. She lived much of her adult life in Britain and, in her final years, was closely associated with the Moroccan city of Marrakesh. Her husband was the oil heir and subsequent philanthropist John Paul Getty Jr.

== Early life ==
Talitha Dina Pol was born in Java, then part of the Dutch East Indies (now Indonesia), daughter of the artists Willem Jilts Pol (1905–1988) and Arnoldine Adriana "Adine" Mees (1908–1948).

Pol spent her early years, during the Second World War, with her mother in a Japanese prison camp. Her father was interned in a separate camp, and her parents went their own ways after the war, Pol moving to Britain with her mother, who died in 1948 in The Hague.

Her father subsequently married Poppet John (1912–1997), daughter of the painter Augustus John (1878–1961), a pivotal figure in the world of Bohemian culture and fashion. She was thus the step-granddaughter of both Augustus John and his mistress Dorothy "Dorelia" McNeil (1881–1969), who was a fashion icon in the early years of the 20th century. By Ian Fleming's widowed mother, Evelyn Ste Croix Fleming née Rose, Augustus John had a daughter, Talitha's step-aunt, Amaryllis Fleming (1925–1999), who became a noted cellist.

Pol studied at the Royal Academy of Dramatic Art (RADA) in London. Writer and journalist Jonathan Meades, who was at RADA several years later, recalled that, after first coming to London in 1964, he saw Pol with her stepmother at Seal House, Holland Park (home of Poppet John's sister, Vivien). Meades thought her "the most beautiful young woman I had ever seen ... I gaped, unable to dissemble my amazement". In 1988, a former Labour Member of the British Parliament Woodrow, Lord Wyatt recalled, with reference to the "success with women" of Antony, Lord Lambton, former Conservative Government Minister, that

...there was that Talitha Pol who was very pretty and had a little starlet job in Yugoslavia; and he went and stayed at the hotel and sent her huge bunches of flowers about every two hours and showered her with presents.

Another to come under Pol's spell was the dancer Rudolf Nureyev, who first met her at a party in 1965. According to Nureyev's biographer, Julie Kavanagh, the two were enthralled with each other, to the extent that Nureyev "had never felt so erotically stirred by a woman" and told several friends that he wished to marry Pol. In the event, Nureyev was unable to attend a dinner party given by Claus von Bülow, at which he and Pol were to have been seated next to each other, and so von Bülow invited instead John Paul Getty Jr., son of his employer, the oil tycoon Paul Getty. Pol and Getty Jr. forged a relationship that led to their marriage in 1966.

== Marriage to John Paul Getty ==
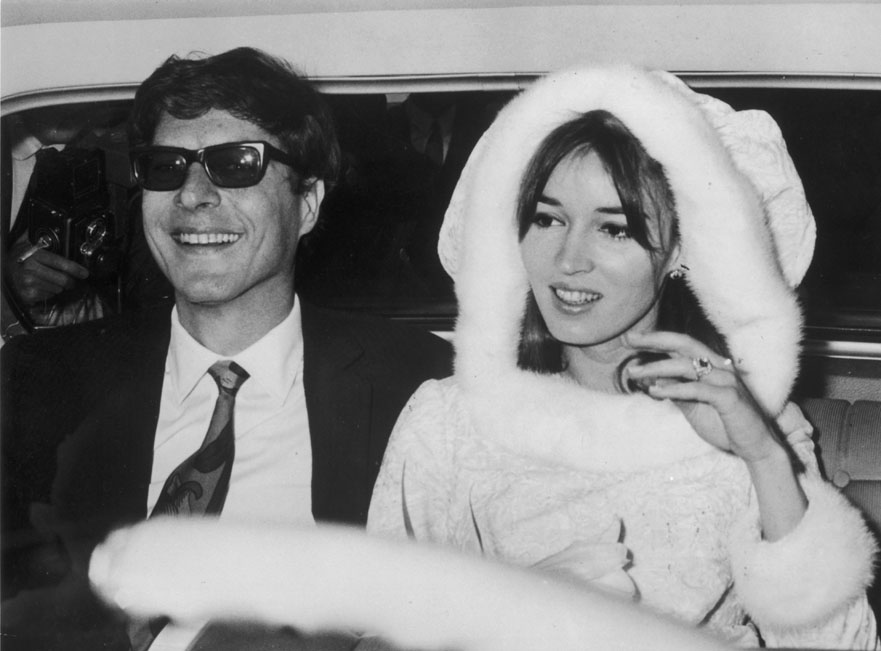
Pol (right) with John Paul Getty Jr. immediately after their wedding at the City Hall in Rome, 10 December 1966.

Pol became the second wife of John Paul Getty Jr. on 10 December 1966. She was married in a white miniskirt, trimmed with mink. The Gettys became part of Swinging London's fashionable scene, becoming friends with, among others, singers Mick Jagger of the Rolling Stones and his girlfriend Marianne Faithfull. Faithfull has recounted her apprehension, through "ingrained agoraphobia", about an invitation to spend five weeks with the Gettys in Morocco ("but for Mick this is an essential part of his life") and how, after splitting from Jagger, she took up with Talitha Getty's lover, Count Jean de Breteuil, a young French aristocrat (1949–1971). Breteuil supplied drugs to musicians such as Jim Morrison of The Doors (with whose girl friend Pamela Courson he had a relationship), Keith Richards, and Marianne Faithfull, who wrote that Breteuil "saw himself as dealer to the stars" and has claimed that he delivered the drugs that accidentally killed Morrison less than two weeks before Talitha's own death in 1971. For his part, Richards recalled that John Paul and Talitha Getty "had the best and finest opium".

Print designer Celia Birtwell, who married designer Ossie Clark, recalled Talitha Getty as one of a number of "beautiful people" who crossed her threshold in the late 1960s, while couturier Yves Saint Laurent likened the Gettys to the title of a 1922 novel by F Scott Fitzgerald as "beautiful and damned". Among other glamorous figures of the Sixties, the fashion designer Michael Rainey, who founded the Hung on You boutique in Chelsea, and his wife Jane Ormsby-Gore, daughter of British ambassador David Ormsby-Gore to the United States during the Kennedy era, "hung out" with the Gettys in Marrakesh between their moving from Gozo to the Welsh Marches.

John Paul Getty, who has been described as "a swinging playboy who drove fast cars, drank heavily, experimented with drugs and squired raunchy starlets", eschewed the family business, Getty Oil, during this period, much to the chagrin of his father.

In July 1968, the Gettys had a son, Tara Gabriel Galaxy Gramophone Getty, who became a noted ecological conservationist in Africa, dropped his third and fourth forenames, and took Irish citizenship in 1999. He and his wife Jessica (a chalet maid he met in Verbier) have three children, including a daughter named Talitha.

By 1969, the dissolute lifestyle the Gettys were leading in Italy and Morocco had begun to wear on Talitha, who wished to pursue treatment for heroin and alcohol addiction and return to Britain. Both she and Paul were unfaithful to one another (Paul was having an affair with Victoria Holdsworth, whom he would go on to marry in 1994), and Paul showed no commitment to becoming sober. He agreed to a separation and purchased a house for his wife and son to live in on Cheyne Walk in London. In early 1970 Talitha was sober and living an active social life in London.

== Marrakesh rooftop photo ==
Talitha Getty is probably best remembered for an iconic photograph taken on a rooftop in Marrakesh, Morocco, in January 1969 by Patrick Lichfield. With her hooded husband in the background, this image, part of the collection of the National Portrait Gallery in London, portrayed her in a crouching pose, wearing a multi-coloured kaftan, white harem pants and white and cream boots.

The look seemed stylishly to typify the hippie fashion of the time and became a model over the years for what, more recently, has been referred to variously as "hippie chic", "boho-chic" and "Talitha Getty chic".

== Film career ==
As an actress, Pol appeared in several films, including Village of Daughters (1962) (as a daughter, Gioia Spartaco); an Edgar Wallace mystery, We Shall See (1964) (as Jirina); The System (1964) (aka "The Girl-Getters" as Helga, a German tourist and the first girl to be hit on by the young men); Return from the Ashes (1965) (as Claudine, alongside Maximilian Schell, Ingrid Thulin and Samantha Eggar); and Barbarella (1968), a sexually charged science-fiction fantasy starring Jane Fonda, in which she had the minor uncredited role of a girl smoking a hookah pipe.

== Death ==
In the spring of 1971, Talitha Getty asked her husband for a divorce after years of living separately, but Paul Jr. was adamant that he still loved her and pleaded with her to come to Rome for a reconciliation. Her lawyers advised her that divorce proceedings would be easier if Talitha could show that she had attempted to reconcile with Paul, so on 9 July 1971 she flew to Rome. She was found dead on 11 July in the Getty apartment on Piazza d'Aracoeli, allegedly of a heroin overdose. However, her death certificate listed the cause as cardiac arrest, with high levels of alcohol and barbiturates found in her blood.

The Italian press speculated that Paul's continued heroin usage had caused Talitha to relapse. An autopsy conducted 8 months after her death found traces of heroin in Talitha's system, but this was inconclusive since heroin can persist in the body for many months, and might therefore have pre-dated her sobriety. In January 1973, Italian authorities announced that an inquest would be held into the causes of Talitha's death; they requested that Paul Jr. submit to an interview. Getty was afraid that his continued drug use would lead to arrest and prosecution, so he fled Italy for the UK in February, and never returned.

Talitha Getty died within the same 12-month period as Jimi Hendrix, Janis Joplin, Edie Sedgwick and, as noted, Jim Morrison, other cultural icons of the 1960s. Her friend Brian Jones of the Rolling Stones, with whom she had spent time in Marrakesh, had predeceased Hendrix by a little over a year.

In 1993 Paul Getty named his new yacht Talitha G in memory of his late wife; it continues in service as Talitha for her step-son Mark.

== Number One ==
The death of Talitha Getty is the subject of the Italian political drama Number One (1973). The film, which disappeared from the public eye because of its clear references to the Getty case and the Number One nightclub, was restored and screened again in 2021. The death of Talitha Pol serves as a trigger for major investigations into drug trafficking and art theft surrounding the nightclub. Talitha Getty's cinematic stand-in character "Deborah Garner" is played by Josiane Tanzilli; John Paul Getty II is the character of "Teddy Garner Jr.", played by Paolo Malco.

== Selected filmography ==
- Village of Daughters (1962)
- The Comedy Man (1964)
- The Edgar Wallace Mystery Theatre ("We Shall See", 1964)
- The System (1964)
- The Long Ships (1964)
- Return from the Ashes (1965)
- Barbarella (Uncredited, 1968)
