= Victoria Holdsworth =

English philanthropist (born 1944)

Victoria Holdsworth Lady Getty
- Born: Victoria Jane Holdsworth; 1944 (age 81–82); Suffolk, England
- Occupations: Philanthropist; model
- Spouse(s): James Bertram Lionel Brooke (m. 1964; div. 1969) Sir Paul Getty (m. 1994; died 2003)
- Father: Gerald Holdsworth

Victoria Jane Getty, Lady Getty (née Holdsworth, formerly Brooke; born 1944) is an English philanthropist and former model. Since 2003 she has been a trustee of the J. Paul Getty Trust.

== Early life ==
Victoria was born in 1944 in Suffolk.

She is the daughter of Gerald Holdsworth, a Suffolk landowner.

== Career ==
She worked as a model.

She appeared in a campaign for Nivea and in advertisements for Gibbs toothpaste.

After her husband's death in 2003, Holdsworth took over as trustee of the J. Paul Getty Trust.

== Personal life ==
She married James Bertram Lionel Brooke, the son of Anthony Walter Dayrell Brooke, in 1964. She and Brooke were divorced in 1969. She married John Paul Getty Jr. as her second husband in 1994. Her husband had been awarded an honorary knighthood in 1987, but was not able to use the title substantively until he became a British subject in 1997. After her husband was granted British citizenship, Holdsworth was styled as Lady Getty. She played a major role in reintroducing her husband to public life and helping him overcome his drug addiction.

Holdsworth lives at Wormsley Park, a country house in Buckinghamshire that was owned by her husband. In 2015 she purchased Lavenham Brook Farm in Suffolk.

== In popular culture ==
Holdsworth is portrayed by the English actress Hannah New in the 2018 television series Trust on FX.
