= John Paul Getty Jr. =

British-American businessman and philanthropist (1932–2003)

Sir John Paul Getty Jr. KBE
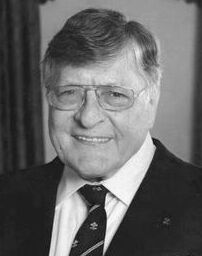
- Born: Eugene Paul Getty; 7 September 1932 near Genoa, Italy (Note: Getty was born onboard a ship in the waters near Genoa, while his parents were travelling. His birth was registered at La Spezia.)
- Died: 17 April 2003 (aged 70); Westminster, London, England
- Citizenship: British (formerly American)
- Education: St. Ignatius College Preparatory; University of San Francisco
- Spouses: Abigail Harris (m. 1956; div. 1964); Talitha Pol (m. 1966; died 1971); Victoria Holdsworth (m. 1994)
- Children: 5, including John III, Mark, and Ariadne
- Parents: J. Paul Getty (father); Ann Rork Light (mother)
- Family: Getty

Sir John Paul Getty (/ˈɡɛti/; born Eugene Paul Getty; 7 September 1932 – 17 April 2003), known widely as John Paul Getty Jr., was a British-American businessman, philanthropist, and book collector. He was the third son of the American-born British oil tycoon J. Paul Getty (1892–1976), who was once the richest man in the world. His mother was J. Paul Getty's fourth wife, Ann Rork. The Getty family's wealth was the result of the oil business founded by George Franklin Getty. One of his sons, Mark Getty, co-founded the visual media company Getty Images.

At birth, he was given the name Eugene Paul Getty, but in later life, he adopted other names, including Paul Getty, John Paul Getty, Jean Paul Getty Jr., and John Paul Getty II. In 1973, his son John Paul Getty III was held captive by kidnappers of the 'Ndrangheta, an Italian criminal organization based in Calabria, as the elder J. Paul Getty refused to pay a ransom to save him.

In 1986, Queen Elizabeth II awarded Getty Jr. with an honorary knighthood for services to causes ranging from cricket, to art patronage, and to the Conservative Party. His honorary knighthood would eventually become substantive upon the required acquisition of British citizenship. A long-time Anglophile, he became a British citizen in 1997. In 1998, he changed his name by deed poll when he renounced the first name Eugene and wished to be known as Sir Paul Getty KBE.

== Early life ==
John Paul Jr. was born on board ship in the waters near Genoa, Kingdom of Italy, on 7 September 1932, while his parents Ann Rork Light and J. Paul Getty were travelling. His birth was registered at La Spezia with the name Eugene Paul Getty, when the Italian notary misheard the name John. He would legally alter his name with the Italian authorities to John Paul in 1958.

He was initially raised in Los Angeles, California, U.S.. His parents' marriage was troubled by J. Paul's long absences abroad and his emotional distance. Ann Getty divorced J. Paul Getty Sr. in 1936 in Reno, Nevada, claiming emotional cruelty and neglect. She was awarded $1,000 per month in child support for each of her sons, Paul Jr. and Gordon.

In 1938, Ann married her third husband, Joseph Stanton McInerney, and the family moved to San Francisco. Paul Jr. attended St. Ignatius College Preparatory and the University of San Francisco, both Jesuit schools. Throughout his adolescence, he showed a great interest in reading and music, encouraged by his mother. In 1950 he was drafted to serve in the Korean War, spending the duration working at the American headquarters in Seoul, South Korea. After he was discharged he met Abigail Harris, the daughter of a prominent San Franciscan federal judge, and the two were married in early 1956. His first child, John Paul Getty III was born in November 1956. The following year he approached his brother Gordon, vice-president of the Getty subsidiary Tidewater Petroleum, asking for a job. His brother gave him a job pumping gas at a Tidewater gas station in Marin County. After a year, his father, whom he had not seen in 12 years, was favourably impressed enough to invite his family and him to Paris, where he offered Paul Jr. a job as president of Getty Oil's Italian subsidiary, Getty Oil Italiana, in Rome.

== Marriages ==
His first marriage was to Abigail "Gail" Harris, a former water polo champion. They divorced in 1964, having had four children: John Paul Getty III, Mark Getty, Ariadne Getty, and Aileen Getty. John Paul Getty III remained in Italy with his mother Gail and attended St. George's British International School in Rome.

His second marriage was to the Dutch actress, model and style icon Talitha Pol, stepdaughter of painter Augustus John's daughter Poppet, on 10 December 1966. The couple adopted a hippie lifestyle, spending much time in Great Britain and Morocco during the 1960s. The two posed for an iconic photograph on a rooftop in Marrakesh, Morocco, in January 1969. The photo, taken by Patrick Lichfield, shows Talitha Getty crouched down leaning on a wall and her husband in the background in a hooded djellaba and sunglasses. The photo appeared in the September 1999 issue of Vogue magazine and is part of the collection of the National Portrait Gallery in London. Two and a half years after the photo was taken, Talitha died of a heroin overdose on 11 July 1971. She was survived by her son with Getty, Tara Gabriel Gramophone Galaxy Getty (born June 1968), an ecological conservationist in Africa. Tara attended Milton Abbey School in the village of Milton Abbas, near the market town of Blandford Forum in Dorset, South West England. In 1994, Sir Paul married for the third time to Victoria Holdsworth.

== Personal problems ==
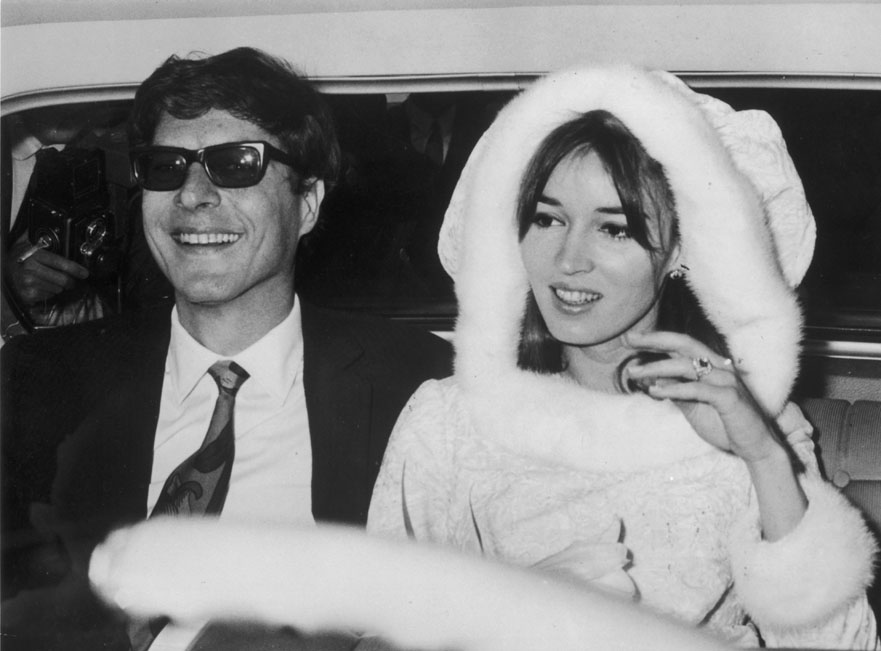
Getty and his bride Talitha at their wedding in 1966

After he married Talitha Pol in 1966, the couple became immersed in the counterculture of the 1960s, living between Rome, Italy, and Marrakesh, Morocco. During a trip to Thailand, the couple developed a severe addiction to heroin. When Getty Sr., who abhorred taking drugs of any kind, heard of his son's addiction, he insisted on his becoming sober. Paul Jr. refused and tendered his resignation from Getty Oil Italiana. The couple lived off his income from the family trust, which amounted to $100,000 a year. In 1969, he and Talitha separated as she decided to focus on becoming sober. He purchased No. 16 Cheyne Walk in Chelsea, London, where the Victorian artist Dante Gabriel Rossetti had lived in the 1960s, for Talitha and their son, Tara, to live in, while he remained in Rome.

=== Death of Talitha ===
After living apart for several years, Talitha, who was sober at the time, asked Paul Jr. for a divorce in early 1971. Still in love with his wife, he insisted that she come to Rome and try for a reconciliation. When her lawyer advised her that divorce proceedings would be easier if she could show that she had attempted reconciliation with Paul, she left for Rome on 9 July. On the morning of 11 July 1971, she was found dead in the Getty apartment in Piazza d'Aracoeli. The autopsy ruled that she had alcohol and barbiturates in her system, but rumours flared up that she had suffered a heroin relapse while spending time with Getty, who was still embroiled in his addiction.

In December 1971, Italian authorities announced that an inquest would be held into Talitha's death the following March. They requested Getty meet with investigators to describe the circumstances surrounding her death. Afraid his own drug addiction would result in his being indicted and potentially imprisoned, Getty left for England. He ignored a subsequent request by an Italian judge to return to Italy for the inquest. Neither an arrest warrant nor an extradition request was ever issued since Getty was not a suspect in Talitha's death, but he never returned to Italy for fear of being detained.

== Son's kidnapping ==
After his second wife's death, Getty became reclusive for a time and his heroin addiction worsened, fueled by guilt over his wife's death.

In Rome on 10 July 1973, 'Ndrangheta kidnappers abducted Getty's 16-year-old son, John Paul Getty III, and demanded a $17 million (equivalent to $123 million in 2025) payment for his safe return. However, the family suspected a ploy by the rebellious teenager to extract money from his miserly grandfather. Getty Jr. asked his father J. Paul Getty for the money, but was refused, arguing that his 13 other grandchildren could also become kidnap targets if he paid.

In November 1973, an envelope containing a lock of hair and a human ear arrived at a daily newspaper. The second demand had been delayed three weeks by an Italian postal strike. The demand threatened that Paul would be further mutilated unless the victims paid $3.2 million. The demand stated "This is Paul's ear. If we don't get some money within 10 days, then the other ear will arrive. In other words, he will arrive in little bits."

When the kidnappers finally reduced their demands to $3 million, J. Paul Getty agreed to pay no more than $2.2 million (equivalent to $16 million in 2025), the maximum that would be tax-deductible. He lent Getty Jr. the remaining $800,000 at four per cent interest. Getty's grandson was found alive on 15 December 1973, in a Lauria filling station, in the province of Potenza, shortly after the ransom was paid. Nine of the kidnappers were apprehended, including Girolamo Piromalli and Saverio Mammoliti, high-ranking members of the 'Ndrangheta, a Mafia organization in Calabria. Two of the kidnappers were convicted and sent to prison; the others were acquitted for lack of evidence, including the 'Ndrangheta bosses. Most of the ransom money was never recovered.

Getty III was permanently affected by his kidnapping and suffered from drug and alcohol addiction during the years that followed. In 1981, he drank a Valium, methadone, and alcohol cocktail which caused liver failure and a stroke, leaving him quadriplegic, partially blind, and unable to speak. Afterwards, his mother cared for him, and she sued his father for $28,000 a month to cover his medical needs. He never fully recovered and remained severely disabled for the rest of his life. He died on 5 February 2011, at the age of 54.

== Later life ==
Following his father's death in 1976, Getty Jr. spent the next decade suffering from depression and checked himself into The London Clinic in 1984. While there, he received a visit from Margaret Thatcher, who at the time was Prime Minister, to thank him for large donations to the National Gallery. During a low period in the 1970s, Getty was cheered up by former England cricketer and later president of the MCC, Gubby Allen, having previously been introduced to the game by Mick Jagger of the Rolling Stones.

Paul III struggled with post-traumatic stress disorder (PTSD) and with alcohol and drug addictions due to his kidnapping. In April 1981, he suffered a drug overdose which left him paralyzed and almost blind. The following November, his mother Gail sued her ex-husband for $25,000 per month to support their son's medical expenses. Despite earning more than $20 million a year from his family trust, Paul II refused to pay for the treatment, leaving his brother, Gordon, to pay his nephew's expenses. The litigation judge who allowed the case to go to trial scolded Paul Jr.: "Mr. Getty should be ashamed of himself spending far more money on court obligations than living up to his moral duties." Claiming that he doubted the severity of his son's debilitation, Getty sent his lawyer to Los Angeles to confirm it and finally agreed to pay the costs.

=== Wormsley Park ===
During his nine-month stint in The London Clinic, Getty purchased a dilapidated country estate in Buckinghamshire, Wormsley Park, on the advice of his close friend Christopher Gibbs. After his release in March 1986, he devoted himself to remodeling the 18th-century mansion and restoring the 3,000 acres (1,200 ha) of parkland. This included the creation of a deer park, the reforestation of 1,500 acres (610 ha) of beechwood forest, and the dredging of a man-made four-acre (1.6 ha) lake with water tapped from an aquifer 400 feet (120 m) below ground. Along with the restoration of the Georgian mansion house, Getty added a castle-like addition made of local flint built to house his extensive library, an indoor heated pool, and a replica of The Oval cricket ground. To house his disabled son, he had an accessible cottage built near the pool, from where he could do his water rehabilitation exercises. The six-year project cost an estimated £60 million.

At Wormsley, Getty hosted his estranged family and improved his relations with his children and ex-wife. To inaugurate his professional cricket ground, Getty hosted a match in May 1992 captained by Imran Khan and Bob Wyatt, with the Prime Minister John Major and Queen Elizabeth the Queen Mother as his guests of honour. His eponymous cricket eleven comprised cricketing stars of both past and present assembled by his honorary cricket managers, Brian Johnston (1992–1993) and Colin Ingleby-Mackenzie (1994–2006).

== Philanthropy ==
Getty donated more than £140m to artistic and cultural causes, from which the National Gallery received £50m. He was appointed Knight Commander of the Order of the British Empire (KBE) by Queen Elizabeth II in 1986, but as a foreign national he could not use the title "Sir". In December 1997, Getty was granted British citizenship and renounced his U.S. nationality. Queen Elizabeth II reportedly commented: "Now you can use your title. Isn't that nice?"

Getty served as president of Surrey County Cricket Club and gave money to Lord's Cricket Ground to build a new stand. He combined his loves of cricket and books when he purchased the ownership of Wisden, the famous publishers of the cricketing almanack. Getty built an extraordinary library at Wormsley, collecting such treasures as a first edition of the Canterbury Tales written by Geoffrey Chaucer, Ben Jonson's annotated copy of The Faerie Queene by Edmund Spenser, and Shakespeare's Folios. He was a notable member of the exclusive Roxburghe Club, famous among book collectors. He commissioned a facsimile copy of The Great Book of Thomas Trevilian.

His personal fortune was estimated at £1.6 billion. His donations included support for the National Gallery, the British Museum, the British Film Institute, Hereford Cathedral, St Paul's Cathedral, the Imperial War Museum, and St. James Catholic Church. Some of his donations, including contributions toward the purchases of Canova's The Three Graces by The National Galleries of Scotland and the Madonna of the Pinks by Raphael, foiled acquisition efforts by the J. Paul Getty Museum endowed by his father. In June 2001, Getty gave £5 million to the Conservative Party. He endowed a £20 million charitable trust to support the arts, conservation and social welfare.

== Death ==
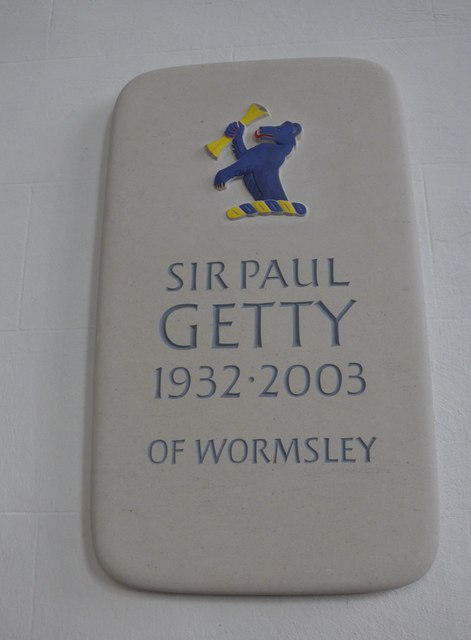
Memorial in St Margaret's church, Lewknor

Getty died at age 70 on 17 April 2003, having been admitted for treatment to The London Clinic for a chest infection.

== Media portrayals ==
Getty Jr. is portrayed by Andrew Buchan in the action film All the Money in the World and by Michael Esper in the television series Trust, both of which dramatize Getty III's kidnapping in Italy.

== See also ==
- Anglophilia
- Getty family
- List of current honorary knights and dames of the Order of the British Empire
- List of richest Americans in history
