= Mark Getty =

Irish-French businessman (born 1960)

Mark Getty KBE
- Born: Mark Harris Getty; 9 July 1960 (age 66); Rome, Italy
- Citizenship: Irish (since 1995)
- Occupation: Businessman
- Known for: Co-founder of Getty Images
- Spouse: Domitilla Harding (m. 1982; div. 2011)
- Children: 3
- Father: John Paul Getty Jr.
- Family: Getty

Mark Harris Getty (born 9 July 1960) is an Irish-French businessman who is the co-founder and chairman of Getty Images.

== Life and career ==
A member of the prominent Getty family, he is the younger son of John Paul Getty Jr. and his first wife, Gail Harris. Getty was born in Rome, Italy. He attended Taunton School in England and later studied philosophy and politics at St Catherine's College, Oxford.

Getty began his career at securities firm Kidder, Peabody & Co. in New York City and then joined Hambros Bank in London. In 1993, he drove his family's founding investment in andBeyond, the world's leading ecotourism business, and still acts as chairman of the business.

In 1994, he co-founded the photographic agency Getty Images with Jonathan Klein. Getty Images is the world's leading supplier of imagery for the media, corporate, and advertising sectors. In 2003, he inherited Wormsley Park from his father. In 2008, Getty became chairman of the trustees of the National Gallery in London, a post he held until 2016. In 2017, Getty became chairman of the British School at Rome.

== Honors ==
In May 2024, Getty was awarded an honorary degree for his contributions to art and philanthropy by The American University of Rome.
