= Ann Getty =

American publisher and philanthropist (1941–2020)

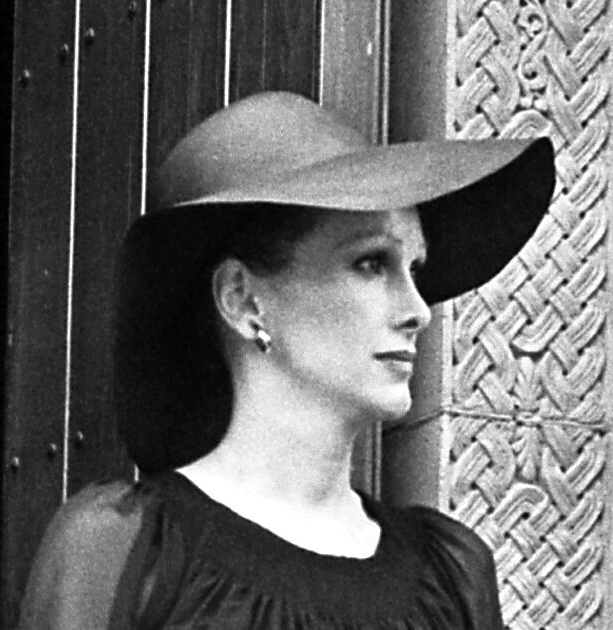
- Getty in 1976
- Born: Ann Gilbert; March 11, 1941; Gustine, California, U.S.
- Died: September 14, 2020 (aged 79); San Francisco, California, U.S.
- Education: University of California, Berkeley
- Occupations: publisher, philanthropist, anthropologist, designer, socialite
- Spouse: Gordon Getty (m. 1964)
- Children: 4, including Andrew
- Family: Getty (by marriage)

Ann Getty (née Gilbert, March 11, 1941 – September 14, 2020) was an American philanthropist, publisher, paleoanthropologist and socialite. As a fellow of the Leakey Foundation, she worked on archeological digs in Turkey and Ethiopia and was part of a team that excavated Ardipithecus fossils. She provided funding for the National Museum of Ethiopia and redesigned the museum's garden. Getty served as president of Grove Press, a publishing house that she and Lord Weidenfeld purchased in 1985, and founded the interior design firm Ann Getty and Associates in 1995.

In 1964 she married billionaire Gordon Getty, the fourth son of oil baron J. Paul Getty, then the richest man in the world and had 4 children. As his wife she was a prominent society hostess in both New York City and San Francisco high society and a philanthropist for political, artistic, and scientific causes. She served on the boards of the Metropolitan Museum of Art, the New York Public Library, New York University, and Wexner Center for the Arts, and was a patron of the San Francisco Symphony, the San Francisco Opera, and the San Francisco Conservatory of Music. Getty ran fundraising events for Democratic political candidates including Kamala Harris and Barack Obama, and hosted cultural salons in her Pacific Heights mansion.

== Early life ==
Getty was born Ann Gilbert on March 11, 1941, in Gustine, California. Her parents, William Gilbert and Anna Bekedam Gilbert, managed a dairy farm. When she was twelve years old, her family moved from Gustine to Wheatland, California, and operated a peach and walnut farm. She graduated from the University of California, Berkeley, with dual degrees in biology and anthropology.

== Career and philanthropy ==
Getty did fieldwork as a paleoanthropologist in the 1990s, participating in archeological digs with the Leakey Foundation, for which she served as a fellow, and Tim D. White in Great Rift Valley, Ethiopia, and in Turkey. She provided funding for the expeditions and financial support for the National Museum of Ethiopia. She was part of the team that excavated the Ardipithecus fossils. Getty worked under Desmond Clark and F. Clark Howell in a laboratory in Addis Ababa as part of the Middle Awash Research Project. She worked alongside researchers Berhane Asfaw, Giday WoldeGabriel, Yonas Beyene, Yohannes Haile-Selassie, Sileshi Semaw, Erksin Savas, and Cesur Pehlevan. She helped upgrade the human evolutionary research laboratory in Ethiopia and created a research facility with fossil storage. She also redesigned the National Museum of Ethiopia's garden.

In the mid-1980s, Getty lived in New York City and served on the boards of the Metropolitan Museum of Art, the New York Public Library, and New York University. In 1985, she and Sir George Weidenfeld created the Wheatland Corporation and purchased the publishing house Grove Press for $2 million. She invested $15 million into the firm and folded Wheatland and Grove together, renaming the unified company Grove Weidenfeld and served as the company's president. In 1993, Grove Weidenfeld became an imprint of Atlantic Monthly Press.

A prominent society hostess in San Francisco, Getty hosted philanthropic events for the arts, sciences, and health care. She entertained artists, public figures, and celebrities including Luciano Pavarotti, Carolina Herrera, Edna O'Brien, Jessye Norman, Plácido Domingo, and Bertrand Delanoë at her Pacific Heights home. She was a political fundraiser for the Democratic Party, hosting fundraising events for Barack Obama, Dianne Feinstein, Gavin Newsom, and Kamala Harris. Getty also hosted non-profit fundraisers from her home for the University of California, San Francisco, UCSF Benioff Children's Hospital, the San Francisco Conservatory of Music, the Festival Napa Valley, the Leakey Foundation, amfAR, The Foundation for AIDS Research, the San Francisco Opera, and the San Francisco Symphony. She also served on the advisory board of Sotheby's. Her home was dubbed the "San Francisco Embassy" by Herb Caen.

In 1987, she and her husband founded the Ann and Gordon Getty Foundation, which primarily supports classical music in the San Francisco Bay Area. The couple also have been among the top benefactors of her alma mater, Berkeley, which is also the alma mater of their son, William, and of J. Paul Getty. In the early 1990s, they contributed $5 million toward the renovation and improvement of Berkeley's Valley Life Sciences Building, and in 2006, Berkeley announced that the couple had contributed $25 million to support teaching and research in the biomedical sciences. They also donated $8 million to the University of California in 2008.

In 1995, she founded Ann Getty & Associates, an interior design firm, and launched the Ann Getty House Collection in 2003. She worked on the homes of Terry Gross, Trevor Traina, and Todd Traina. In 2012, she published an interior design book titled Ann Getty: Interior Style.

Getty founded Playgroup, an accredited private Montessori preschool housed in her Pacific Heights home that was attended by her granddaughter, Ivy Getty.

== Personal life ==
Getty met Gordon Getty, son of Getty Oil founder J. Paul Getty, at a bar in San Francisco. They eloped in Las Vegas on December 25, 1964. They had four sons and lived in a mansion in Pacific Heights. Her husband carried on an affair with Cynthia Beck, with whom he has three children. Getty's son, Andrew Rork Getty, died in 2015; followed by the death of her son, John Gilbert Getty, in November 2020.

Getty and her husband were known as international jet setters, and often traveled on their private Boeing 727, The Jetty, to attend music and art festivals around the world.

She died from a heart attack in San Francisco on September 14, 2020, aged 79. Due to the COVID-19 pandemic in California, the Getty family hosted a small, private memorial service. U.S. Speaker of the House Nancy Pelosi and San Francisco Mayor London Breed both issued public statements regarding Getty's death.
