= Getty House =

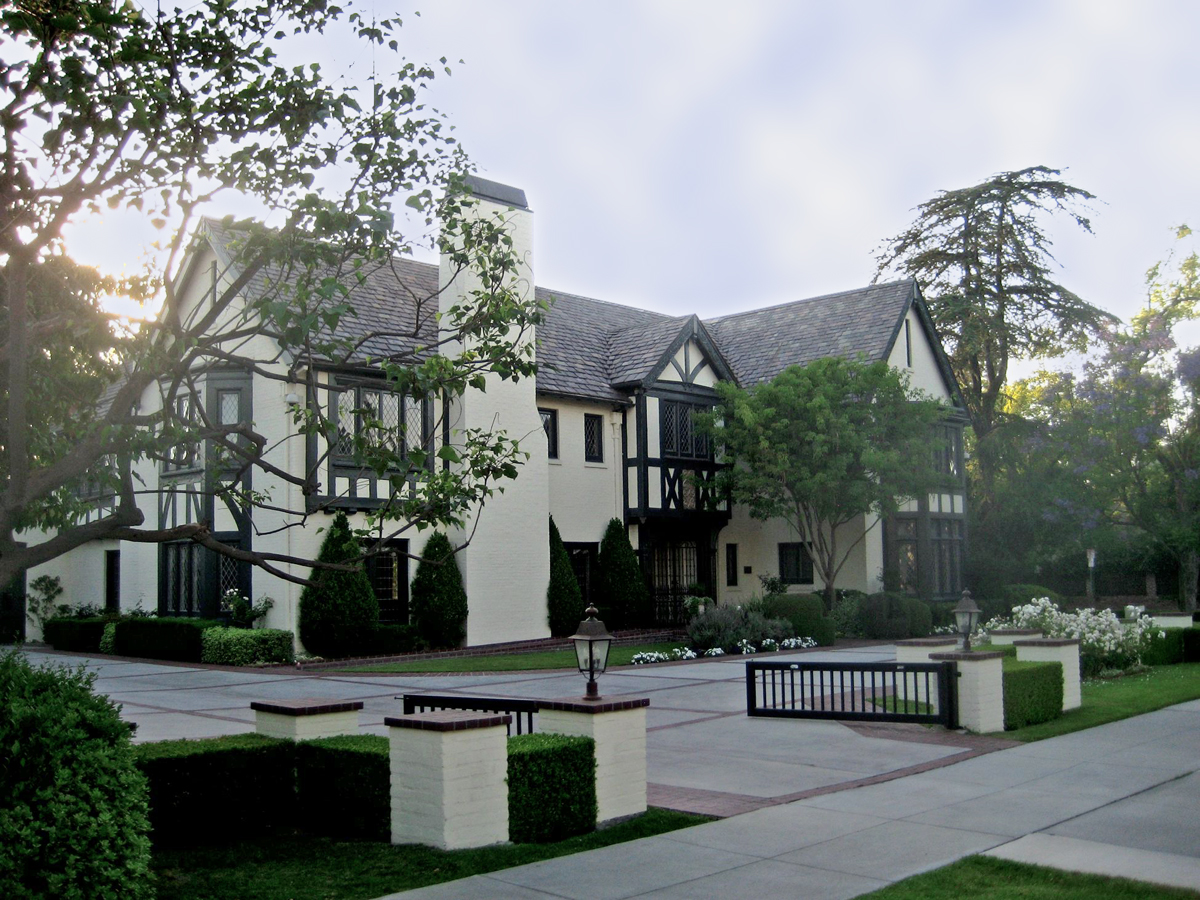
- The Getty House, in Windsor Square, official home of the Mayor of Los Angeles, California (2008)

General information
- Type: Mayor's residence
- Architectural style: Tudor revival
- Location: 605 South Irving Boulevard (in Windsor Square), Los Angeles, California, United States
- Coordinates: 34.063272°N 118.318779°W
- Current tenants: Karen Bass, Mayor of Los Angeles
- Completed: 1921
- Cost: $83,000 (1921)
- Owner: City of Los Angeles (since 1975; 51 years ago)

Design and construction
- Other designers: A. E. Hanson (gardens)

Website
- gettyhouse.org, website of the Getty House Foundation

The Getty House is the official residence of the mayor of Los Angeles, California. It is located at 605 South Irving Boulevard in Windsor Square, a historic district east of Hancock Park, about 5 miles (8.0 km) west of the Los Angeles City Hall.

== History ==
The house is named after George Getty II, the son of oil tycoon J. Paul Getty. It was designed and built in the Tudor Revival style in 1921 for $83,000 ($1.5 million in 2025). The Getty Oil company purchased the house in 1959, and offered the property to the City of Los Angeles on November 12, 1975. The original gardens were designed by A. E. Hanson, and have been restored. According to the Los Angeles County Assessor, the property spans approximately 0.5 acres (2,000 m^{2}) – 22,523 square feet (2,092.5 m^{2}).

The house was built by Swedish immigrant Paul Paulson and his wife Leta, who moved to Los Angeles from Iowa. Paulson established two cafeterias, one in downtown Los Angeles, and the other on Catalina Island.

== Mayor's residence ==
The house became the official residence for the mayor of Los Angeles. Mayor Tom Bradley was the first to move into the house at the beginning of his second term in 1977, and resided there until leaving office in 1993. However, his two immediate successors opted not to move into the house, so it was unoccupied between 1993 and 2005. Mayor Richard Riordan (1993–2001) resided at his house in Brentwood. Mayor James Hahn (2001–2005) lived in San Pedro so his children could be near their mother's residence.

After his election in 2005, Mayor Antonio Villaraigosa announced that he and his family would live in the house on at least a part-time basis, alternating between it and their existing home in the Mt. Washington district on the Northeast side. However, in September 2005, Villaraigosa decided that he would move into the house full-time, becoming the second mayor to reside there. In June 2007, Villaraigosa and his wife, Corina, announced that they were separating, and he would temporarily move out of the Getty House, while his wife and children continued to reside there during the separation.

In 2013, newly elected mayor Eric Garcetti announced that he, his wife, Amy Wakeland, and their daughter Maya, would move into the house.

After the 2022 election, mayor Karen Bass moved into the house in January 2023. On Sunday morning, April 21, 2024, a person broke a window and entered Mayor Bass' residence. The mayor and her family were unharmed. The suspect was apprehended.

== School zone ==
The house is zoned to the following LAUSD schools: 3rd Street Elementary School, John Burroughs Middle School, and Los Angeles High School.

== See also ==
- 1921 in architecture
- Arts and culture of Los Angeles
- List of American houses
- List of historic houses
