= Windsor Square, Los Angeles =

Windsor Square
- Neighborhood of Los Angeles
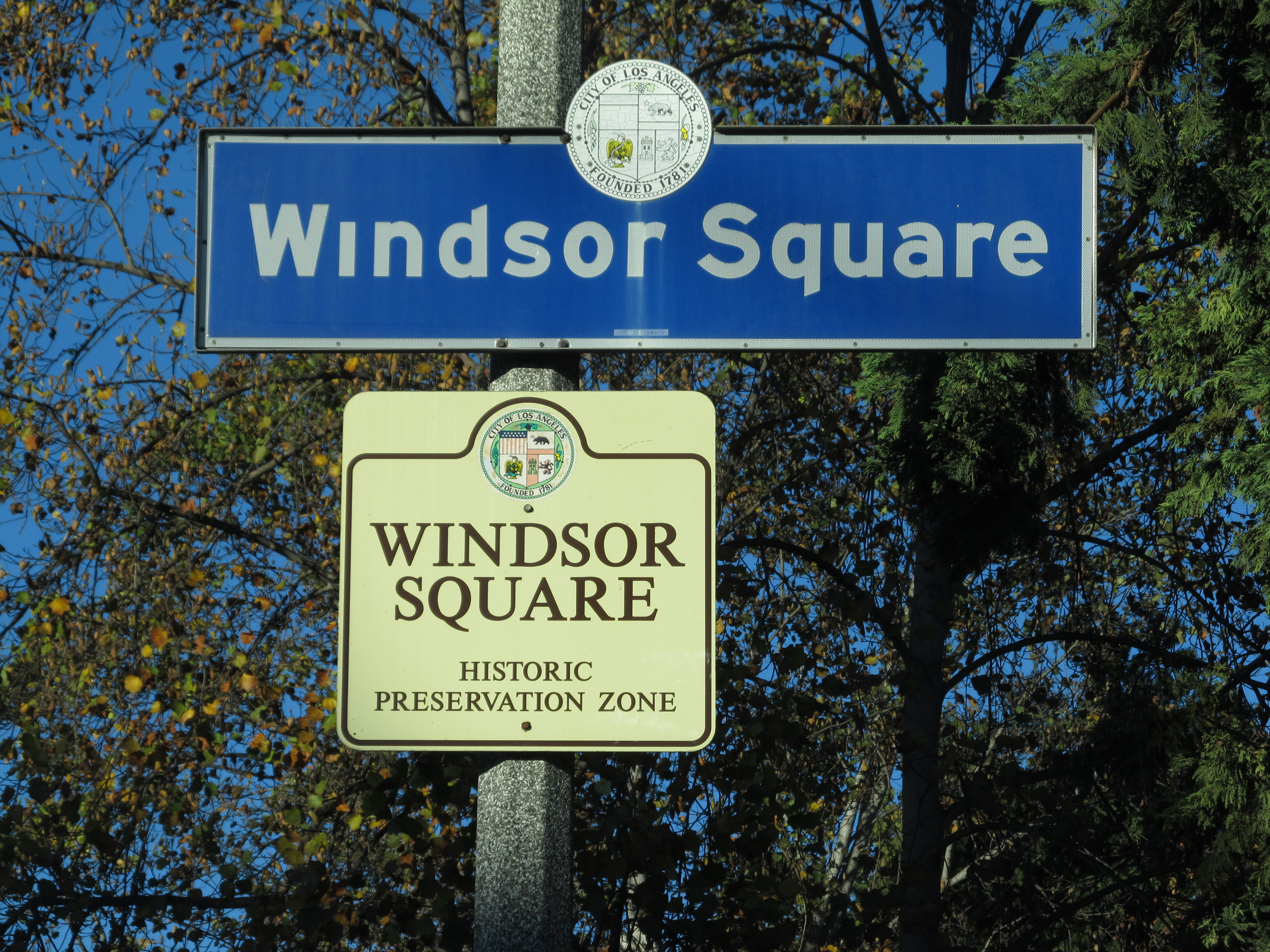
- Windsor Square Neighborhood Sign located at the intersection of Third Street and Van Ness.

- Location within Western Los Angeles
- Coordinates: 34.0692°N 118.3206°W
- Country: United States
- State: California
- County: Los Angeles
- City: Los Angeles
- Time zone: UTC-8 (PST)
  - Summer (DST): UTC-7 (PDT)
- Zip Code: 90004, 90020, 90010
- Area code: 323

Windsor Square is a small, historic neighborhood in the Wilshire region of Los Angeles, California. It is highly diverse in ethnic makeup, with an older population than the city as a whole. It is the site of the official residence of the mayor of the city and is served by a vest-pocket public park.

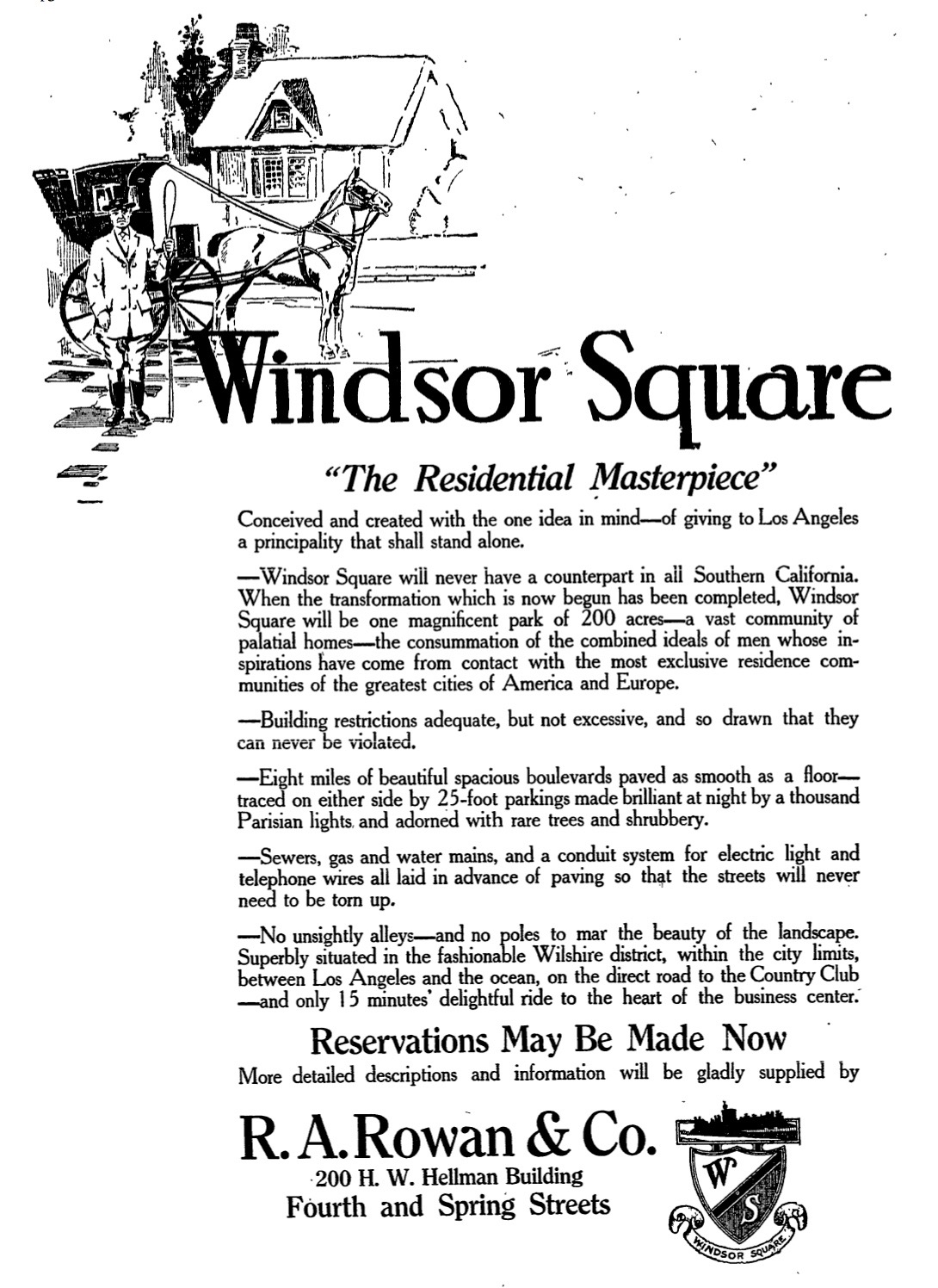
Windsor Square advertisement, 1911

== History ==
Between 1900 and 1910 a financier named George A.J. Howard envisioned a beautiful tranquil park as a setting for family homes built in a countryside style in what was then an undeveloped and rural area about halfway between the city center (now Downtown LA) and the coast. Howard pushed the early city fathers to get his development plan approved, and in 1911, Mr. Robert A. Rowan was able to initiate a residential development called Windsor Square.

The development was constituted as a private square. At that time there were dense groves of bamboo in the area that needed to be destroyed before trees and gardens could be cultivated. Intervening walls or fences were discouraged so that one garden ran into another, creating a park-like setting. Windsor Square was the first area in the city to have the power lines below grade—an extraordinary innovation for 1911.

To make sure that the homes were significantly upscale, deed restrictions contractually obligated a buyer to spend at least $12,000 on building a home to ensure that only the highest-quality residences were erected. A variety of houses were constructed, including Tudor Revival, Italian Renaissance Revival and Dutch Colonial Revival. Many outstanding architects designed homes for the area, including Paul Williams, John M. Cooper, and A. C. Martin. As a result, many of the city's elite moved west to Windsor Square, including developer Howard and Norman Chandler, who took up lifelong residence with his wife Buffy on Lorraine Boulevard.

Though the homes that fronted Wilshire Boulevard have been demolished to make way for commercial buildings, an active neighborhood association has succeeded in preserving the character of Windsor Square.

In 1958, the J. Paul Getty Company bought a house on Irving Boulevard in Windsor Square. The Getty Oil Company was headquartered near the house at the intersection of Wilshire Boulevard and Western Avenue and intended to construct a new corporate headquarters on the site. Residents blocked the move, plans were abandoned, and the property now serves as the official residence of the mayor of Los Angeles.

== Geography ==
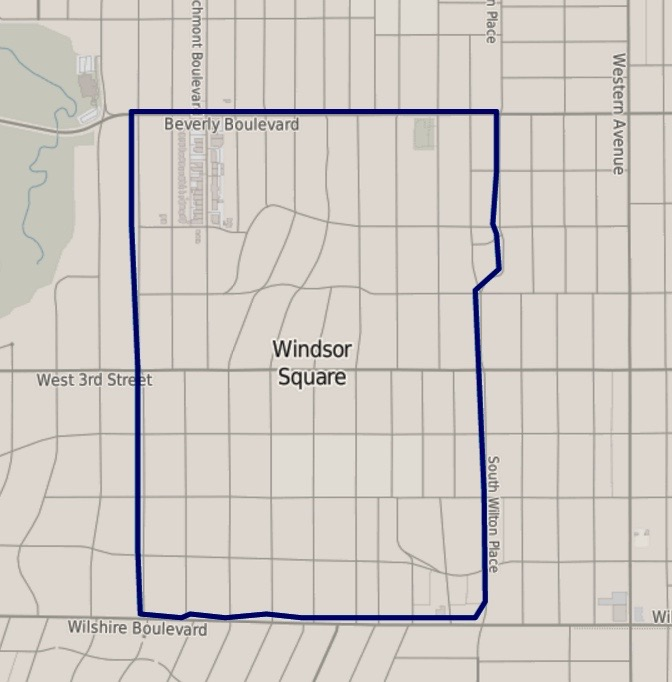
Windsor Square boundaries, from the Los Angeles Times

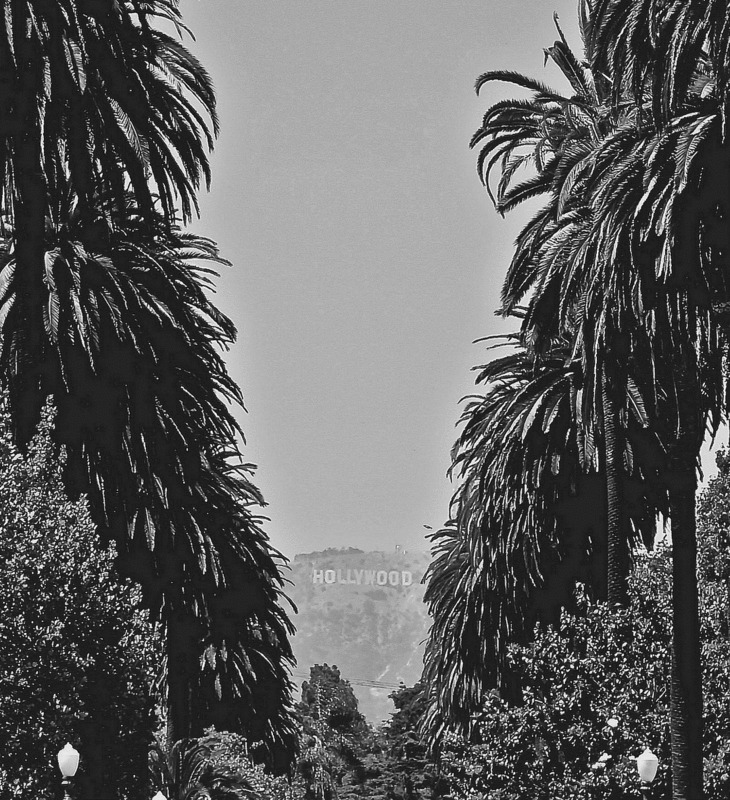
Encompassed in Windsor Square --, Windsor Boulevard in Los Angeles, California, US

According to the Windsor Square Association, Windsor Square is a neighborhood of 1,100 homes between Beverly Boulevard to the north, Wilshire Boulevard to the south, both sides of Arden Boulevard to the west, and both sides of Van Ness Avenue to the east. The Los Angeles Times Mapping L.A. project extends Windsor Square's eastern boundary slightly, to Wilton Place.

== Population ==
In 2008, the neighborhood had an estimated population of 6,197. According to the 2000 census, Windsor Square was highly diverse, with the percentage of Asian people being high for the county. The racial breakdown was 41.6% Asian, 37.7% white, 14.8% Latino, 4.3% black, and 1.6% other. About a third (33.5%) of the residents were born outside the United States, considered a high ratio for Los Angeles, the most common country being South Korea at 57.7%.

The median household income was average for both the city and the county, while the percentage of households earning more than $125,000 was high for the county. The median age was 38, considered old in both the city and the county, the percentages of residents aged 35 to 64 being among the county's highest. The percentages of both widowed men and widowed women were among the county's highest, but the percentage of families headed by single parents was notably small. The percentage of veterans who served during the Vietnam War was among the county's highest.

== Education ==
Windsor Square residents are highly educated. According to the 2000 census, 46.1% of the residents had a four-year degree, high compared to the city or the county as a whole. There are no schools within the boundaries of Windsor Square.

== Recreation ==
Robert L. Burns Park, on the southwest corner of North Van Ness Avenue and Beverly Boulevard, is an unstaffed pocket park. Beginning in 1980, resident Barbara McRae, who was tired of noise, litter, drugs and prostitution around the park, began writing letters to city officials, and the next year she presented petitions with 2,248 signatures supporting the idea of private security patrols for the city facility. The city responded by building a 12-foot masonry wall and a chain-link fence between the park and neighboring homes. By 1989, though, criminal activity had spread throughout the surrounding neighborhood, and the Windsor Square Property Owners Association requested that the park is closed at sunset and that it be fenced, gated and locked. On December 3, 1990, an $85,000 tubular steel perimeter fence was officially installed and put into use.

== Notable residents ==
Mayors who have lived in Windsor Square:

- Tom Bradley
- Antonio Villaraigosa
- Eric Garcetti

Other notable Windsor Square residents:

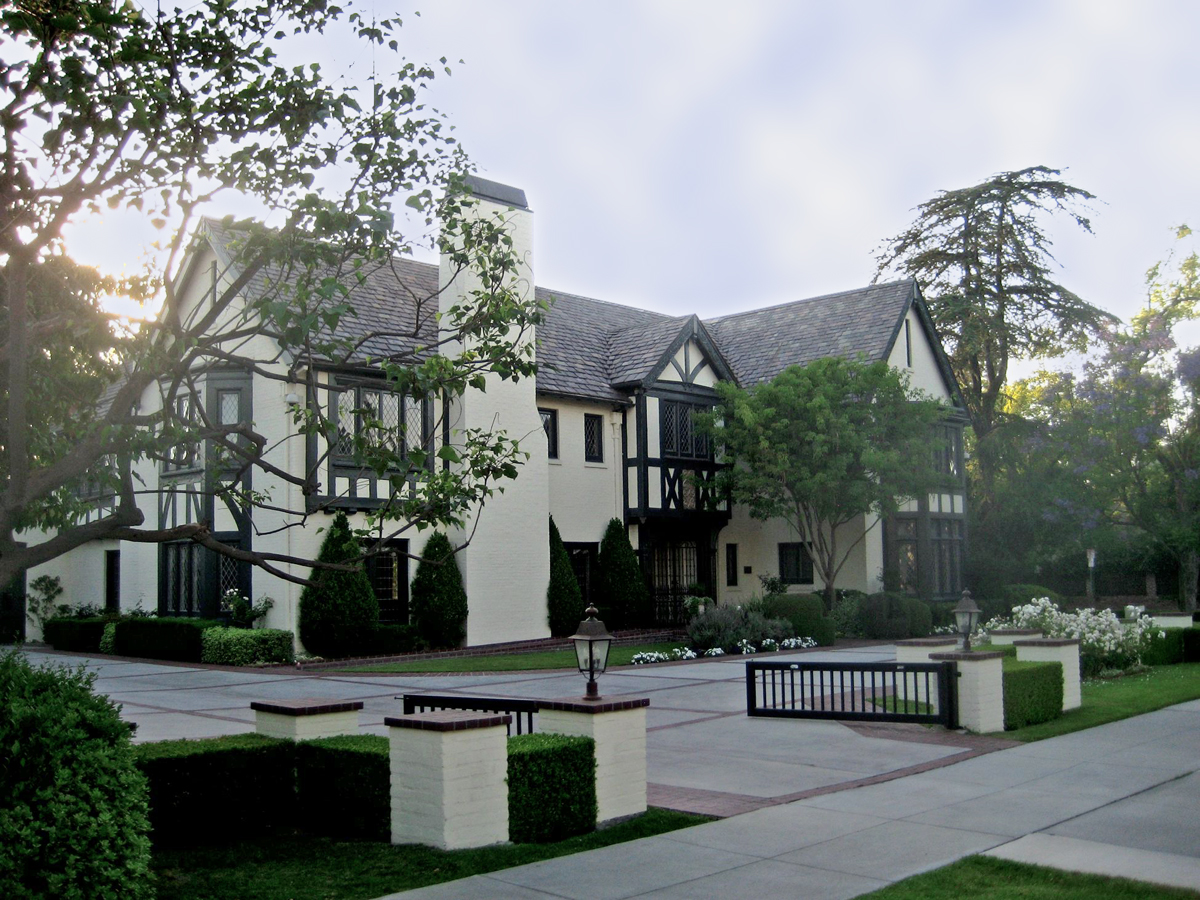
Getty House

- Christian Audigier, fashion designer
- John Barrymore, actor
- Chris Brown, singer
- Norman and Dorothy Chandler, publisher of the Los Angeles Times
- Dolores Costello, actor
- George Getty II - executive in Getty Oil company; his residence, Getty House, was donated to the city, and is the official residence of the serving Mayor of Los Angeles.
- Harold A. Henry, Los Angeles City Council president
- Neal McDonough, actor
- Oliver Morosco, theatrical producer, director, writer and theater owner.
- Bill Simmons, podcaster and sportswriter
- Kat Von D, tattoo artist, singer, musician.
- Maxine Waters, U.S. Representative for California's 43rd District (although Windsor Square is in the 37th District)
- Peter, Edwin and Harold Janss, land developers.
