= Ivy Getty =

American oil heiress and model (born 1994)

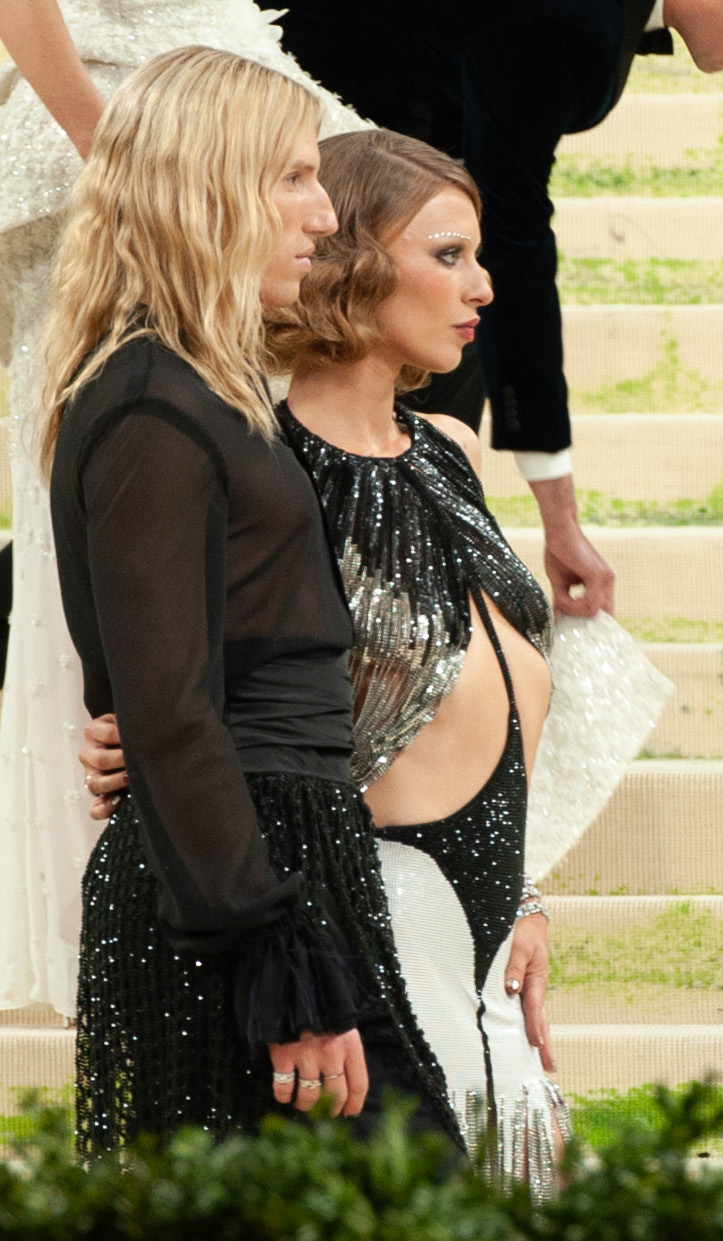
- Getty (right) with Ludovic de Saint Sernin at the 2026 Met Gala
- Born: Ivy Love Getty; December 20, 1994 (age 31); Ventura, California
- Education: Loyola Marymount University
- Occupations: Model, Singer
- Years active: 2015–present
- Spouse: Tobias Alexander Engel (m. 2020–2024)
- Family: Getty
- Modeling information
- Height: 5 ft 9 in (175 cm)
- Hair color: Blonde
- Eye color: Green
- Agency: Ford Models

Ivy Getty (born 1994) is an American heiress, model, and musician. She is also a member of the Getty family.

== Biography ==
Getty was born on December 20, 1994 in California. Ivy was raised in San Francisco by Ann Getty and Gordon Getty, her paternal grandparents. Her father is John Gilbert Getty of the Getty family and her mother is Alyssa Boothby, a jewellery designer.

== Career ==
=== Modeling ===
Ivy’s modeling journey began early in her childhood, when she appeared in a campaign for Baby Gap. After moving to New York City in 2021, Getty signed a contract with Ford Models.

Getty has been featured in Vogue, British Vogue, Vogue Hong Kong, Tatler, W, Elle, and more. She has also been on the cover of L'Officiel, Town & Country (alongside Tom Blyth and later Cornelia Guest), Paper, Fashion ¡Hola!, Von by Ellen von Unwerth and more. Getty also walked for Lingua Franca in February 2025 during New York Fashion Week.

Getty was featured in a Spring 2025 ad campaign for Neiman Marcus. She has additionally appeared in campaigns for Christian Louboutin, Edie Parker, and more.

=== Fashion ===
Getty has been described by multiple publications as an "it girl", and frequently attends fashion shows in the front row.

In 2022 Getty appeared on the International Best Dressed Hall of Fame List. Getty attended the 2024 Met Gala in a dress made from two 18th Century Qing Dynasty tapestries designed by Conner Ives.

=== Philanthropy ===
Getty has focused philanthropic endeavors on animal welfare, women’s rights and mental health awareness.

In May 2024, Getty held a closet sale where all proceeds went to Remake, a charity which focuses on women’s rights and climate justice in the clothing industry.

Getty has two rescue chihuahuas. In 2023, they were featured on the cover of New York Post Alexa, alongside Getty to raise awareness on animal welfare.

=== Music ===
In July 2024, Getty released her debut song One Hit Wonder.

== Personal life ==
Getty studied and attended Loyola Marymount University where she earned her BFA.

In 2020, Getty married photographer Tobias Alexander Engel in a private ceremony. In 2021 Getty married Engel in a public ceremony officiated by Nancy Pelosi at San Francisco City Hall. Her maid of honor was British-Argentine actress Anya Taylor-Joy. Bridesmaids also included Alice Longyu Gao and others.

Her wedding dress was a custom design by John Galliano for Maison Margiela.

In April 2024, Getty filed for divorce.
