= The Canterville Ghost (disambiguation) =

The Canterville Ghost is a fantasy, comedy short story by Oscar Wilde published in February 1887.

The Canterville Ghost may also refer to the following adaptations:

Film and TV

- The Canterville Ghost (1944 film), 1944 American film directed by Jules Dassin
- The Canterville Ghost (1985 film), 1985 American film directed by William F. Claxton
- The Canterville Ghost (1986 film), 1986 American television film directed by Paul Bogart
- The Canterville Ghost (1996 film), 1996 American television film directed by Sydney Macartney
- The Canterville Ghost (2016 film), 2016 film directed by Yann Samuell
- The Canterville Ghost (2021 TV series), 2021 British BBC Studios and American BYUtv television series
- The Canterville Ghost (2023 film), 2023 animated film directed by Kim Burdon and Robert Chandler

Musical

- The Canterville Ghost (Knaifel opera), 1966 opera composed by Alexander Knaifel
- The Canterville Ghost (Getty opera)
- The Canterville Ghost (stage musical), 1995 stage musical by Peter Quilter and Charles Miller

== See also ==
- Other adaptations of Wilde's story
- Bhoothnath, 2008 Indian film adaptation
