= Pacific Western Oil Corporation =

Holding company of Pacific Western Oil Company

Pacific Western Oil Corporation was a holding company for the stock of the Pacific Western Oil Company.

== History ==
Incorporated on November 10, 1928 in Delaware, Pacific Western Oil was founded to acquire substantially all oil producing properties (Note: Production was obtained from these districts: Ventura Avenue; Inglewood; Huntington Beach; Alamitos Heights (Seal Beach); Torrance; Los Alamos; East Coyote; In October 1928 they yielded 16,000bpd (13,000bpd after royalties) with ca. 4,000bpd of production capacity shut in. 8 wells were drilling, all in the Ventura Avenue field. The existing contract with the Richfield Oil Company for purchase of all production up to 20,000bpd was continued.) and the greater part of undeveloped oil properties in California of the Petroleum Securities Company. The sole stockholders of Petroleum Securities were Edward L. Doheny and his family. Of the 2,000,000 no par shares authorized of Pacific Western Oil Corp, 1,000,000 were outstanding and a block of 670,000 were offered to the public at $24 per share. An additional $15,500,000 were raised with the issue of 6.5% 15-year bonds dated Nov 1, 1928 which came with stock purchase warrants. (Note: For each $1,000 principal amount the holder was entitled to buy 15 shares at $33 1/3 before November 1, 1938. 232,500 shares of unissued common stock were reserved for this conversion privilege. Warrants were detachable in case the bond was called. There was a sinking fund to redeem 60% of the bonds by maturity. All proceeds from warrant conversions to be used to retire bonds.) The properties acquired were appraised at $43 million. Jacques Vinmont was the first chairman of the board and William C. McDuffie (Note: Entered the oil industry as roustabout in the Coalinga Oil Field in 1909 and was made production superintendent for Shell Oil Co. at Coalinga in 1915 and eventually became general manager of Royal Dutch Shells worldwide production headquartered in The Hague. Resigned from Shell to become PWO president in 1928 and resigned as PWO president to become receiver for Richfield Oil Company.) was president. The remaining initial Board of Directors were Earle Bailie, James R. Simpson, Lloyd Gilmour, Charles R. Blyth, Edward Nolan, George L. Eastman, and David P. Babcock. Pacific Western paid the Dohenys $25,000,000, which was said at the time to be the largest cash transfer in the West.

J. Paul Getty was elected to the board in 1930. Control of the company passed to Getty on February 9, 1932, the result of a two year campaign of stock accumulation. After this the board was expanded from nine to ten members. H. Paul Grimm was elected the new president of the board. Emil Kluth, H.M. Macomber, Fero Williams, and E.H. Parkford were also elected to the board.

Getty interest in Pacific Western Oil (Feb 1, 1935)
Company	Shares owned	6.5% bonds owned
Getty, Inc.	115,500	$415,000
George F. Getty Oil Co.	316,000	
Minnehoma Oil & Gas Co.	243,319	
Total	674,819	

On May 7, 1935 PWOilCo (operating subsidiary) sold its leaseholds and equipment in the Baldwin Hills (Inglewood) field (acquired in November 1928) and its interest in the Kettleman North Dome (acquired in March 1929) for $12,150,000 ($2,150,000 in cash and purchase and cancellation of $10,000,000 of the 15-year 6.5% bonds. (Note: the stock warrants void after Nov 1, 1938 remained intact in the hands of the prior bondholders) PWOilCorp was then free of long term debt. The buyer was the Shell Union Oil Corp. / Shell Oil Co. of California.

The Pacific Western Oil Co. (operating subsidiary) was dissolved on August 29, 1936 and the properties transferred to the holding company which then effectively changed its character to an operating company. The no par common stock was replaced by $10 par common stock at the end of 1936. There were still 1,000,000 shares outstanding.

PWO sold $2,100,000 3.5% 10-year notes dated August 1, 1939, proceeds of which were used to pay back to Harris Trust & Savings Bank and First National Bank of Chicago prior loans of $2,100,000.

J. Paul Getty individually or as trustee in 1941 owned the entire outstanding stock of George F. Getty, Inc. It was agreed that PWO would acquire the entire stock (78,033.2 shares of par $100) in exchange for 1,273,421 newly issued shares of its own stock. When the U.S. Treasury Department refused a request filed August 23, 1941 to allow this transaction to be tax-free, the plan was abandoned. George F. Getty, Inc owned 687,519 PWO shares and a $828,821 PWO promissory note, among other assets, including oil production assets. In other words, assuming Getty owned none of the 312,481 remaining PWO shares and, arguendo, that the new treasury stock of 687,519 shares would have been cancelled, Getty's ownership in the merged company would have been 80.3% [1,273,421 / (1,273,421 + 312,481)] up from 68.8%.

The company was awarded the Saudi Arabian half of the Saudi Arabian-Kuwaiti neutral zone joint concession in 1949.

The company sold $10,000,000 of 3.5% 15-year bonds dated June 1, 1949, proceeds of which together with a $5m bank loan (Note: 2.75% 5-year notes to be repaid $1m annually on June 30, 1950 with last payment on June 30, 1954) were used to repay a Feb 21, 1949 $10.5 million bank loan used for the upfront $9.5 million Neutral Zone concession payment and the first $1 million in annual royalty to the Saudi government. $3,303,035 were used to repay an April 29, 1949 loan used to buy 127,777 shares of Tide Water Associated Oil Co. at $25.60 per share and the balance for general corporate purposes.

Securities owned (June 1949)
Company	Shares	% Shares
Mission Corp (Nevada) (Note: Was authorized by shareholders on May 12, 1938 to engage as an operating company in the business of oil production. Had been solely a holding company before.)	645,608	47%
owned 208,132 in 1935 owned 641,808 in 1939 in 1940 Mission Corp owned 57% of Skelly Oil common stock and 16% of Tide Water Associated Oil Co. common stock (Note: As of June 30, 1940 Mission Corp owned 1,097,223 TWAO, 573,557 Skelly and 44,700 PWO shares, constituting 96.7% of all assets of Mission Corp.) in December 1948 exchanged its entire holding of 1,417,000 Tide Water shares for 2,834,000 shares of Mission Development Corp and by May 2, 1949 had distributed 5/6 of those as dividends for each share of its own stock.
Tide Water Associated Oil Co (Delaware)	705,631	11%
owned 269,700 in 1934 owned 300,000 in 1935 owned 250,100 in 1939
Mission Development Co. (Delaware) (Note: Came into existence in a December 4, 1948 board meeting. Mission Corp exchanged its entire holding of 1,417,000 Tide Water stock for newly issued 2,834,000 $5 par shares of Mission Development Corp. A stock dividend was paid on December 28, 1948 of 1/3 share of Mission Development Corp for each share of Mission Corp. The purpose was to allow PWO to sell (if needed) stock of Mission Development Corp without diminishing their 47% position in Mission Corp and to preserve the integrity of the Tide Water block of shares. On May 2, 1949 Mission Corp paid a further dividend of 1/2 shares of Mission Development Corp for each share of Mission Corp. The same procedure was repeated in December 1950 and a further 996,622 Tide Water shares were exchanged for newly issued 1,993,324 Mission Development Corp shares and April 9, 1951 1/2 share of Mission Development Corp was paid as a stock dividend for each share of Mission Corp stock.)	538,007	19%
represents the stock dividends paid Dec 28, 1948 and May 2, 1949 and equivalent to 269,003.5 Tide Water shares
Pacific Western Oil Co Ltd (Province of Alberta)	6,700	67%
Skelly Oil owned 33%
Santa Fe Oil Co Ltd (Province of Alberta)	16,750	67%
Skelly Oil owned 33%
Getty Realty Corp		100%
owned the Hotel Pierre, New York

The common stock was traded on the New York Curb Exchange until in September 1933 it was listed on the NYSE.

Pacific Western Oil price range
1920s (Note: 1928: 1929:)
									8	9
High									26 1/4	26 5/8
Low									20	12 1/8
Div									none	
1930s (Note: 1930: 1931,1932: 1933: 1934: 1935: 1936: 1937: 1938: 1939: Div 1928-1937:)
	0	1	2	3	4	5	6	7	8	9
High	19 1/2	15	8	9 1/2	9 3/8	14	23 1/2	29 3/4	15 7/8	11 7/8
Low	5 1/2	2 7/8	3	5 3/4	5 1/2	6 3/4	11 3/4	11 3/4	10	7
Div.	none			25c	40c	25c	65c	75c		
1940s (Note: Share price: 0 1 2 3 4 5 6 7 8 9)
	0	1	2	3	4	5	6	7	8	9
High	8 7/8	9 3/4	9	17 1/2	17 1/2	32 7/8	34 5/8	59 3/4	62 3/4	44
Low	5 1/2	4 3/4	5 1/8	9	12 3/4	16 1/4	18 1/4	21 3/4	39 1/2	29 1/4
1950s (Note: Share price: 0 1 2 3)
	0	1	2	3	4	5	6	7	8	9
High	53	22 3/4	26 1/2	47 3/4						
Low	36	17	17 3/4	22 1/2						

When the Wafra field was discovered in the Neutral Zone, the stock price went from 28 7/8 on March 20, 1953 to 47 3/4 on March 31, 1953.

Effective April 25, 1956 the Pacific Western Oil Corporation was renamed the Getty Oil Company.
