= Andrew Getty =

American businessman (1967–2015)

- Born: Andrew Rork Getty; July 1, 1967; San Francisco, California, U.S.
- Died: March 31, 2015 (aged 47); Hollywood Hills, California, U.S.
- Education: Dunn School; University of Southern California; New York University
- Occupations: Businessman, film director, philanthropist
- Parent(s): Gordon Getty; Ann Getty
- Family: Getty

Andrew Rork Getty (July 1, 1967– March 31, 2015) was an American oil heir, businessman, film director and philanthropist. He was the son of Gordon Getty, the grandson of J. Paul Getty, and the cousin of John Paul Getty III.

== Early life ==
Andrew Rork Getty was born July 1, 1967 in San Francisco, California. His father, Gordon Getty, is an heir and classical music composer. His mother, Ann Gilbert Getty, was a philanthropist. His paternal grandfather, J. Paul Getty, was the founder of the Getty Oil Company.

Getty was educated at Town School for Boys in San Francisco and the Dunn School, a prep school in California. He then attended the University of Southern California and New York University, studying film.

== Career ==
Getty was the president of A. Rork Investment Inc., an investment vehicle. He was the manager of Rork Productions, a production company.

In 2002, Getty started filming The Storyteller starring Frederick Koehler, Sean Patrick Flanery, Brianna Brown, Dina Meyer and others. The film was eventually released under the title The Evil Within in 2017, 15 years after the project started and two years after Getty's death.

=== Philanthropy ===
Getty made charitable contributions to the paleontology department of the Natural History Museum of Los Angeles County.

== Personal life ==
Getty lived in a historic mansion formerly owned by composer Miklós Rózsa on Montcalm Avenue in the Hollywood Hills. He was a recluse. Two weeks before his death, he filed a restraining order against his ex-girlfriend Lanessa DeJonge.

Getty died on March 31, 2015, at age 47. His body was found by DeJonge. An ulcer was suspected in the intestinal bleeding that killed him. His personal assistant said Getty had complained of stomach pain in the two months beforehand. The Los Angeles county coroner ruled the death accidental, with methamphetamine use and heart disease as contributing factors.
