= Kendalle Getty =

American artist (born 1988)

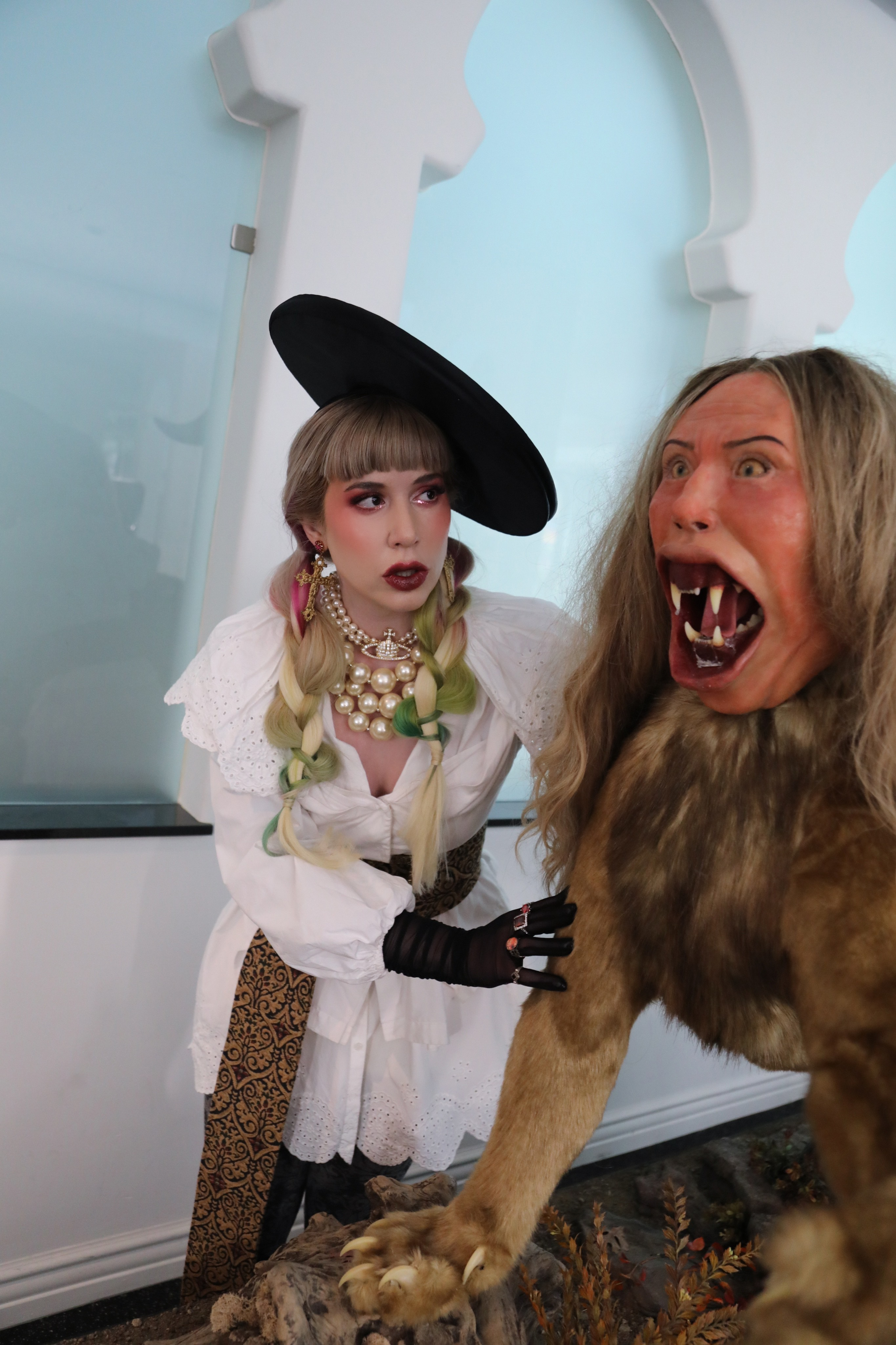
- Getty and M/other (2021-2024)
- Born: Kendalle Getty; October 1, 1988 (age 37); Los Angeles, California, United States
- Other names: Kendalle Fiasco; Kendalle Aubra
- Education: New York University Steinhardt School of Culture, Education, and Human Development (Bachelor of Fine Arts in Video art and Sculpture)
- Occupations: Artist; Advocate; Creative Producer
- Years active: 2018–present
- Known for: Multidisciplinary installations exploring identity, inheritance, and psychological landscapes; works featuring wax busts, mirrors, and crystal furniture
- Notable work: Hostile Home * Mirror of Influence (2025) * Angry Feminist Pin-Up Calendar (2018)
- Parent(s): Gordon Getty; Cynthia Beck

Kendalle Getty (born October 1, 1988), also known as Kendalle Fiasco and Kendalle Aubra, is an American multimedia artist, advocate, and creative producer. Her interdisciplinary practice incorporates painting, sculpture, performance, poetry, music, and design, often exploring themes of identity, ritual, mortality, and language. Getty is known for installations such as Hostile Home and Mirror of Influence, which use materials including wax, mirrors, and crystal furniture to examine inheritance, psychological landscapes, and transformation.

== Early life and education ==
Getty was born in Los Angeles, California, to real estate developer Cynthia Beck and composer and philanthropist Gordon Getty. Previously known as Kendalle Fiasco and Kendalle Aubra, she was raised primarily outside the public spotlight and has cited her delayed awareness of her familial connections as an influence on her exploration of identity and lineage in her work.

She received a Bachelor of Fine Arts degree in video art and sculpture from New York University’s Steinhardt School of Culture, Education, and Human Development, where she was selected for the senior honors studio program. During this time, she began creating installation-based work focused on themes of memory, psychology, and symbolic healing.

== Career ==
Getty’s early projects included the Angry Feminist Pin-Up Calendar (2018), a reimagining of traditional pin-up imagery that centered women, non-binary people, and survivors of violence. She also participated in performance poetry events under stage names including Kendalle Fiasco and Kendalle Aubra.

In 2023 she presented Hostile Home, an installation series exploring themes of domestic space, neglect, and ornamentation. In 2025, her exhibition Mirror of Influence was shown in Los Angeles during Frieze Art Fair, featuring wax busts designed to melt over time, mirrored clocks, and crystal furniture. The works were noted for their engagement with themes of mortality, transformation, and inheritance.

== Artistic practice ==
Getty’s work incorporates symbolic materials, personal mythologies, and sculptural interventions to investigate emotional and psychological landscapes. Her installations often blend luxurious or ornate objects with references to domestic space, familial dynamics, and transformation. Notable projects include:

Writers have noted that Getty’s work draws on psychoanalytic theory, including Lacan’s mirror stage, as well as semiotics (known as the study of signs and symbols) and feminist art history.

Group exhibitions:

- When The Spirit Moves You, Elijah Wheat Showroom / Geary Contemporary, Millerton, NY, 2024.
- PARAMNESIA, Echo Park Art Gallery, Los Angeles, CA, 2024.
- FEVER DREAM, Swivel Gallery, Los Angeles, CA, 2024.
- OBSESSED, Zepster Gallery, Brooklyn, NY, 2024.

Poetry performances:

- Mirror of Influence, February, 2025.
- Poetry Brothel, August 2024.
- Cortex Worship Poetry Parlour, August 2023.
- Poetry Brothel, February 2023.

== Critical reception ==
Getty’s work has been discussed in several art and culture publications. In March 2025, Document Journal profiled her wax-sculpture installation in “Wax, fire, and the Getty name,” describing it as exploring “the tension between inherited identity and artistic self-determination.”

In July 2023, Dazed featured her project Hostile Home, characterizing it as a symbolic reclamation of personal trauma through sculptural form. That same year, Cultured Magazine highlighted her use of mythological motifs and material excess, particularly in works involving crystallized furnishings and hybrid creatures.

== Philanthropy and advocacy ==
Getty is actively involved in arts philanthropy and cultural initiatives. She serves as:

- The chair of the Ann and Gordon Getty Foundation
- A member of the Performa Commissioning Council
- A supporter of the Poetry Society of New York

Her work in these areas supports experimental performance, contemporary art, and poetry.

== Creative production ==
In addition to her fine art practice, Getty works as a creative producer:

Short Film Direction: Directed multiple short films including Happy Birthday, Mr. President (2008), a disruption of visual literacy with pop-political undertones; Political Apathy (2007), capturing the camp and schizophrenia of Postmodernism with the abject, drawn-out view of reality television—or, television reality; and Friday (2007), a study in abjection and Freud’s Uncanny. Getty also worked as the Executive Producer of Child Actor (2023), featuring the artist formerly known as Glüme.

Music Video Direction: Directed and produced Brittany, a visual project featuring Sean Ono Lennon.

Ritual Candle Series: Crafted a line of hand-poured candles embedded with symbolic objects, described by Document Journal as functional artworks tied to her installations. Musician: Released multiple tracks under the name Freudian Slit.

== See also ==
- Performance art
- Feminist art
