= Usher House =

2014 opera by Gordon Getty

Usher House is a 2014 opera by Gordon Getty to the composer's own libretto based on Edgar Allan Poe's 1839 short story "The Fall of the House of Usher". The staged world premiere of the opera took place in June 2014 at the Welsh National Opera and was later performed by the San Francisco Opera. It was performed as a pair with his opera The Canterville Ghost at the Centre for Contemporary Opera in New York in August 2017.

== Recording ==
- Christian Elsner (tenor), Benedict Cumberbatch (speaker), Lisa Delan (soprano), Phillip Ens (bass), Étienne Dupuis (baritone); Gulbenkian Orchestra, conductor: Lawrence Foster, 1 SACD Pentatone
