= The Museum of History, Science, and Art =

Museum in Los Angeles, California

The Museum of History, Science, and Art was a museum in Los Angeles, California from 1913 until 1961 when it split into two institutions, Natural History Museum of Los Angeles County and Los Angeles County Museum of Art. It was stronger in its natural history holdings, but as an art museum, it organized loan exhibitions of Francisco Goya, Vincent Van Gogh, Rubens and Leonardo da Vinci.

== History ==
In the 1890s, William Miller Bowen started a campaign to change the nature of what is now Exposition Park. There were saloons, gambling and other vice-related activity happening in the part. In 1909, Bowen's campaign succeeded in enacting a three-part ownership of the park between the state of California, Los Angeles County and the City of Los Angeles. The County agreed to develop and build a history and art museum.

Construction on the museum began, with a cornerstone laid in a ceremony officiated by the Grand Lodge Masons of California, and attended by Bowen, Los Angeles Mayor George Alexander and future California Governor William Stephens.

Four local organizations filled the galleries of the new museum: the Historical Society of Southern California, Cooper Ornithological Club, Southern California Academy of Sciences and the Fine Arts League. In 1913, the Museum was given exclusive rights to prehistoric remains from the La Brea Tar Pits, then called Rancho La Brea.

The Museum of History, Science, and Art opened on November 6, 1913 in Exposition Park.. The original building was completed in 1912 and is in the Spanish Renaissance style, with Romanesque and Beaux Arts elements as well. The architects were Frank Hudson and William A.D. Munsell. The opening festivities lasted two weeks and coincided with the opening of the Owens River Aqueduct and U.S. Senator John D. Works said that a fountain at the museum site commemorated the aqueduct.

The museum received donations of art from William Randolph Hearst and Hollywood legend Buddy DeSylva among others. In 1951, Hearst's will provided for income to benefit the museum.

== Split ==
In 1961, the museum split into two entities: what is now the Natural History Museum of Los Angeles County and the Los Angeles County Museum of Art.

Edward W. Carter helped orchestrate the fundraising effort for the new art museum in response to J. Paul Getty's increasing reluctance to donate any more artworks to the museum. Getty had donated a few excellent artworks such as the Ardabil Carpet and Rembrandt's Portrait of Martin Looten, but then became aware of their shabby and disorganized presentation in the county's aging multipurpose museum and chose to establish his own art museum next to his house.

As to how to separate art objects from history and science objects, beginning in 1957, Richard F. Brown, who was to become the first director of LACMA and famed collector Norton Simon began to separate the art that would be part of the new art museum.
