= The Evil Within (2017 film) =

2017 film by Andrew Getty

- Theatrical release poster
- Directed by: Andrew Getty
- Written by: Andrew Getty
- Produced by: Robert Hickey; Kent Van Vleet; Michael Luceri
- Starring: Frederick Koehler; Michael Berryman; Sean Patrick Flanery; Dina Meyer; Kim Darby; Brianna Brown
- Cinematography: Stephen Sheridan
- Edited by: Michael Luceri; Michael Palmerio
- Music by: Mario Grigorov
- Production companies: Supernova LLC; The Writers Studio
- Distributed by: Vision Films
- Release date: February 26, 2017 (Fantasporto)
- Running time: 98 minutes
- Country: United States
- Language: English
- Budget: $4–6 million

The Evil Within is a 2017 American independent psychological horror film written and directed by Andrew Getty in his directorial debut, starring Frederick Koehler, Michael Berryman, Sean Patrick Flanery, Dina Meyer, Kim Darby, and Brianna Brown. It was originally titled The Storyteller. The film's conception and development were a personal project of Getty's, who largely self-financed it at an estimated cost of $4–6 million; the film's production entered development hell and took fifteen years to complete. Following Getty's death in 2015, editing for the film was completed by producer Michael Luceri.

The film made its official première at the Fantasporto Film Festival on February 26, 2017, and later on at the Dead by Dawn Horror Film Festival and Mórbido Film Festival during the same year. It was acquired by Vision Films shortly after its première, who released it via Video on Demand on April 4, 2017. The Evil Within received mixed reviews from critics, who criticized the film's unevenness and dialogue while simultaneously commending it for its strangeness and Getty's devotion to the material.

== Plot ==
Dennis is a 30-year-old man with a disability who has had nightmares all his life since he was a child, including one where he and his mother entered a carnival ride that seemed underwhelming until he is told that "the ride isn't over." As an adult, Dennis has one where a living demon, called the Cadaver, fastens a zipper onto his back and enters his body. He finds a hidden room in the cellar that holds a mirror that Dennis believes the Cadaver came from. He begins speaking to his reflection, who seems to answer back to him.

Dennis' brother John has difficulty of his own. His girlfriend, Lydia, demands that they get married, but is upset that he will not do anything about Dennis. He is visited by Mildy Torres, a woman from social services, who believes that Dennis needs to be taken away. This upsets John as he feels that Dennis is his responsibility. Dennis continues to have nightmares of the Cadaver and his reflection informs him that in order to get rid of it, they need to perform animal sacrifice. He begins working in the secret cellar, which perplexes John, especially when he sees that Dennis has videos on taxidermy and embalmment.

Once Dennis begins killing children, his reflection takes on a more competent demeanor and reveals that "he" was the one giving him the nightmares and that they still have more killing to do. Dennis meets with his crush Susan, an employee at his favorite ice cream place, and tries to ask her out, but the conversation gets awkward and Susan turns him down, hurting him. He returns and scares her where she runs out into the street and gets killed by a moving vehicle. When John and Lydia take Dennis to his favorite restaurant, he supposedly kills a man in the bathroom without hesitation, scaring himself. Dennis attempts to destroy the mirror but his reflection pushes him in and takes on the "real" Dennis instead.

After a night out, John and Lydia discover that they cannot seem to recognize anyone, implying that Dennis has killed more people. Torres arrives at the house with two officers and are all killed by Dennis. John reveals to Lydia his secret: Dennis was a child prodigy whose works had been published in the newspapers. One day while arguing, John punched Dennis and he fell down the stairs. When he awoke, his mentality diminished greatly and John has felt guilty ever since. Lydia sympathizes with John and leaves to get Dennis. However, John's friend Pete reveals that the taxidermy and embalmment tapes are Dennis' and later calls the cops.

Lydia arrives at the house and is stabbed by Dennis, who proceeds to remove her insides. John arrives and enters the cellar, where he sits in a chair with a spotlight on it. Dennis appears with a now-stuffed Lydia and puts on a ventriloquist act and John realizes he is glued to the chair. The previous victims have all been stuffed and are used in an extravagant diorama revealing that John intentionally knocked Dennis down the stairs to get rid of him. As more stuffed bodies are revealed, it becomes unclear if John or Dennis is seeing what is actually happening. Overwhelmed, John takes a gun and shoots himself. Dennis is slammed down by a Cadaver-Spider hybrid only for it to be revealed that he is actually being restrained by police officers who drag him away.

Following his arrest and trial, Dennis ends up in the padded cell of a psychiatric hospital. The reflection Dennis is still in control while the real Dennis is trapped deep in his subconscious. All Dennis can do now is wait to have the dream where he can get off the carnival ride.

== Cast ==
- Frederick Koehler as Dennis Peterson
- Sean Patrick Flanery as John Peterson
- Dina Meyer as Lydia
- Michael Berryman as Cadaver
- Kim Darby as Mildy Torres
- Francis Guinan as Dr. Preston
- Brianna Brown as Susan
- Tim Bagley as Pete
- Matthew McGrory as Man at Preston's Table

== Production ==
The Evil Within was inspired by the childhood nightmares of Getty himself. According to a post-production producer who had worked on the film and a friend of Getty, Ryan Readenour: "When he was young he would have these really powerful, sick, twisted dreams, and [they were] so shocking to him that he didn't think they came from him." Getty conceived the idea that it could be a storyteller who created these dreams, and The Storyteller was then used as the first title of the film. In a supplementary interview on the DVD release, Getty also stated he was inspired by the David Berkowitz Son of Sam killings, in which Berkowitz said he was ordered to kill by a demon taking the form of a talking dog. Getty postulated, what if there really was a demon giving the serial killer orders.

Filming began in 2002, and the film was shot largely in Getty's own mansion in Hollywood Hills, Los Angeles. He also converted one of the rooms in his mansion into a post-production suite. He made his own unique camera rigs, built expensive sets, and with his FX team he created elaborate animatronic robots, including an octopus that can play a drum kit. The production however would stop and start over many years as it was beset with funding issues and conflicts with the cast, including a lawsuit from a studio assistant. The cast and crew also went through a number of changes, and according to Frederick Koehler, only he and Michael Berryman made it through to the changes.

This was the final film to feature Matthew McGrory who appeared in an uncredited cameo from footage shot before his death in 2005. The health conditions of both McGrory and Berryman (who had been ill for some years) had slowed down the production and scripted scenes had to be replaced.

Getty continued to work on the film for many years after the filming, creating his own special effects and trying to perfect the film. He died in 2015 before the film was finished, with the coloring and editing not completed. Producer Michael Luceri, who had also edited the film, finished the film.

== Release ==
The Evil Within made its official première at the Fantasporto Film Festival on February 26, 2017. It was later screened at the Dead by Dawn Horror Film Festival on April 20 that same year. Amsterdamned Film Festival on October 27. That same day the film was alternately screened at the Mórbido Film Festival as a part of its "New Blood" section.

=== Home media ===
The film was later acquired by Vision Films and released on April 4, 2017 on VOD services in North America such as Amazon under a new title, The Evil Within.

== Critical reception ==
The Evil Within received mixed reviews from critics, with many critics noting the unevenness of the film. However, on Rotten Tomatoes, the film received a 100% approval rating based on 6 reviews, and an average rating of 7/10 . Most noted that in spite of its flaws, the movie succeeds in more ways than not. David Fontana of Film Inquiry thought that the film is "riddled with strange and unfocused plot-lines" and "filled with cringeworthy character acting", and that it "becomes so wrapped up in its own eccentricities that it is all but impossible to follow coherently". He nevertheless praised the film for its surreal visuals and special effects, and thought the "nuanced details" of the film "help to raise The Evil Within above its flaws", and that "it's hard to argue with that much [of Getty's] devotion to this singularly distinguished work of art". Charles Bramesco of The Guardian considered the film "very clearly the handiwork of a rank amateur under the influence of powerful narcotics", but that "Getty’s monomaniacal drive and technical knowhow resulted in some truly outré horror", and that his "wild experiments with the form command respect". Travis Johnson of Filmink criticized the film's dialogue, and felt that there were "no discernible reasons for scenes and interactions to exist at all", but still judged it "one of most singularly strange films to come along in a good while" and that it is a "remarkable cinematic artifact that is absolutely worth experiencing".

Andrew Todd from Birth.Movies.Death. gave the film a mostly positive review, stating that the film was 'far more elaborately crafted than one would expect'. Todd further noted that the film's perceived "faults" were actually its strengths, comparing the film to Marcin Wrona's final film Demon as "it's hard to watch without reading the director's psychological state and subsequent death into it." Andrew Marshall from Starburst Magazine rated the film a score of 7/10, while noting the film's "dubious" sub-plots and occasionally stilted dialogue, Marshall stated, "The Evil Within will not be for everyone, and as the years pass it's likely that the story of its prolonged production and tortured creator will become better known than the film itself, but one thing you can say for sure is that Andrew Getty has left his mark upon the world." Matt Boiselle from Dread Central awarded the film 3.5 out of 5 stars, writing, "Solid cast-work, a disquieting overall aura, and Matthew McGrory in one of his final on-screen appearances – it all adds up to a film that should be in your queue of midnight watches now."

== See also ==
- Deal with the Devil
- Disability in horror films
- List of films about demons
- List of films shot over three or more years
- Spirit possession
