= Fine Arts League =

Early 20th-century civic arts organization in Los Angeles

The Fine Arts League of Los Angeles was a civic arts organization founded in 1906 to promote the establishment of a permanent public art gallery in Los Angeles. Incorporated in March 1907, the League organized art exhibitions and campaigned for a museum in which works of art could be exhibited to the public.

The League became one of four local organizations that helped found, furnish and organize the galleries of the Los Angeles County Museum of History, Science and Art, which opened in Exposition Park in 1913. The art division of that institution later developed into the Los Angeles County Museum of Art (LACMA).

== History ==
=== Formation ===
The League grew out of efforts by Los Angeles art patrons and members of women's cultural organizations to establish regular exhibitions and a permanent gallery in the city. S. Henrietta Housh, an educator, lecturer and amateur painter associated with the Ruskin Art Club, was a central organizer. Art historian Ruth Westphal described Housh as a leader of the Ruskin Art Club who advocated regular exhibitions and subsequently founded and served as a vice president of the Fine Arts League.

Historian Sarah Schrank dates the founding of the League to 1906 and writes that it was subsequently commissioned by the Los Angeles County Board of Supervisors to build an art collection and oversee the classification of traditional works of art for public display. The organization was formally incorporated in March 1907.

By 1910, the League's officers included attorney and civic leader Thomas E. Gibbon as president; architect Alfred F. Rosenheim as first vice president; banker John Hyde Braly as second vice president; Housh as third vice president; Rose La Monte Burcham as recording and financial secretary; and Mrs. H. L. Story as treasurer. Annual membership cost $2, while life membership cost $50.

=== Exhibitions and campaign for a museum ===
Before it had access to permanent museum galleries, the League arranged temporary and loan exhibitions. On April 5, 1909, it opened a loan exhibition containing paintings by nationally known American artists and local painters. The exhibition was held at photographer and art dealer George Steckel's gallery in downtown Los Angeles.

The League initially considered obtaining an independent building for an art museum. Its surviving records include material concerning both the proposed Los Angeles County Museum and the search for a separate building for the League. Contemporary press coverage identified the organization's objective as the advancement of a permanent museum.

The organization ultimately concentrated its efforts on the county museum being planned for Agricultural Park, renamed Exposition Park in 1910. A contemporary national art directory reported that the League had received a 50-year commission connected with the new museum and would place works of art in its rotunda and galleries and arrange temporary exhibitions.

=== Los Angeles County Museum ===
On February 7, 1910, the Fine Arts League, the Historical Society of Southern California, the Southern Division of the Cooper Ornithological Club, and the Southern California Academy of Sciences entered into an agreement with Los Angeles County concerning the proposed museum and art gallery. The four organizations were expected to provide materials for its exhibitions.

Representatives of the participating organizations served in the museum's early governance. The museum's original governing board included representatives of the Fine Arts League, the Historical Society of Southern California, the Southern California Academy of Sciences and the Cooper Ornithological Club, along with county and at-large representatives.

When the Los Angeles County Museum of History, Science and Art formally opened on November 6, 1913, the Fine Arts League was particularly associated with the development of the museum's rotunda and art galleries.

Schrank writes that disagreements soon developed between members of the Fine Arts League and the museum's Board of Governors. According to her account, the disputes led to the resignation of the League's chairwoman and began a recurring pattern of conflict between the museum's art personnel and its governing authorities.

=== Inactivity ===
By 1916, Housh was listed as the League's acting president, painter Guy Rose as first vice president, Joseph E. Mackay as second vice president, and Rosenheim as secretary-treasurer. The organization had 62 members, but the American Art Annual described it as inactive. The surviving organizational records principally cover the period from 1905 through 1915. A precise date of legal dissolution has not been identified in published sources.

== Legacy ==
The Fine Arts League was one of several voluntary associations that supplied expertise, collections and exhibition materials to Los Angeles County's first general museum. Its work helped ensure that fine art was included alongside history and natural science when the museum opened in 1913.

The county museum was divided into separate art and natural-history institutions in 1961. The Los Angeles County Museum of Art opened its Wilshire Boulevard campus in 1965; the Los Angeles Times later described the event as the art division of the mixed-use Exposition Park museum gaining a home of its own. The Fine Arts League is therefore part of LACMA's institutional history, although it was a separate membership organization rather than an earlier name for LACMA.

The League's papers are preserved as the Fine Arts League of Los Angeles Records, 1905–1915, collection GC 1057, at the Seaver Center for Western History Research of the Natural History Museum of Los Angeles County. The collection contains correspondence, minutes, reports, bylaws, membership and financial records, agreements and exhibition ephemera.
