= Skelly Oil =

American oil company 1919-1977, brand revived 2012

Skelly Oil Company
- Type: Public Corporation
- Industry: Oil
- Predecessor: Skelly Sanky Oil Company
- Founded: 1919; revived 2012
- Defunct: 1977
- Fate: Acquired by Getty Oil
- Headquarters: Boulder Towers, Tulsa, Oklahoma
- Key people: William Grove Skelly, founder; Chesley Coleman Herndon, co-founder; Frederick A. Pielsticker, co-founder
- Products: Motor oils, lubricants, natural gas, motor fuels
- Number of employees: approx. 5,000
- Subsidiaries: Hawkeye Chemical, Vancouver Plywood, Surfco Marketing

Skelly Oil Company was a medium-sized oil company founded in 1919 by William Grove (Bill) Skelly, Chesley Coleman Herndon and Frederick A. Pielsticker in Tulsa, Oklahoma. J. Paul Getty acquired control of the company during the 1930s. It became defunct when fully absorbed by Getty Oil Company in 1974, and the disused Skelly brand logo was revived by Nimmons-Joliet Development Corp. in 2012.

== History ==
=== Founding ===
Bill Skelly (1878–1957) came to Oklahoma from Pennsylvania in about 1913 where he worked as a mule skinner and tool dresser in the oil fields around Ardmore and Duncan, Oklahoma, prior to partnering with Jack Sanky, a/k/a, John S. Sankey to form Skelly - Sankey Oil Company in Duncan, Oklahoma, in 1915. An advertisement in The Pittsburgh Press on January 4, 1922, stated that Skelly Oil Company was formed to take over the oil properties of Skelly and of the Skelly - Sankey company.

Chesley Coleman Herndon was a practicing attorney in Tulsa when he won several court victories against William Skelly involving oil leases on Osage Indian land. Skelly summoned Herndon to his office for a meeting after his final loss in court, and shortly thereafter, the two unlikely allies, along with Fred Pielsticker, the son of German immigrants who was orphaned at age twelve and became a renowned engineer, would form Skelly Oil Company.

Herndon was the son of Captain Thomas Herndon, a Civil War veteran who oversaw a family fortune in real estate, tobacco and banking in Tennessee. Captain Herndon's cousin William Herndon was Abraham Lincoln's law partner in Illinois.

For the next 37 years, Skelly and Herndon held the number one and two positions in the company, and are buried 25 feet apart in Tulsa's Rose Hill Mausoleum, the same distance as their desks for almost half a century. A 1932 Fortune Magazine article stated that "Skelly Oil Company is a great success because of the different temperaments of its top executives... in this company, William Skelly is the accelerator and Chesley Herndon is the brake."

=== Growth ===
The company entered into the refining business by purchasing the Midland Refining Company in El Dorado, Kansas, in 1922. Throughout much of its history, Skelly was a popular gasoline marketer throughout the Midwestern United States and was a market leader in several cities throughout its marketing area including Tulsa, Oklahoma City, Kansas City, Wichita, Topeka, Omaha, Des Moines, Minneapolis/Saint Paul and other cities.

Skelly's branded products included Skelly Skeltane, Regular, 50-50, Special, Keotane and Powermax gasolines; Skelly Supreme, Tagolene, Skelmark and Ranger motor oils; and Skelgas propane products through Skelgas franchised stores. What may have been unique to Skelly, beginning in the late 1950s it offered its female customers a Ladies Credit Card in a shade of light blue.

Skelly Oil Company grew to become a major oil company known for its exploration and production expertise as well as the capabilities of its refineries and manufacturing facilities in conjunction with its well-established marketing and distribution network. Skelly Oil Company was involved early in offshore drilling and production ranging from Alaska and the Gulf of Mexico to the Persian Gulf with a foreign presence in Canada, Argentina, Australia, Korea, Libya, Iran, and Mozambique. In addition to its E&P and refining divisions, Skelly Oil Company also had chemical, manufacturing, engineering, and research divisions. It was a pioneer of LPG products and building upon its base of substantial uranium ore reserves, established a role in conversion and fuel fabrication and in recovery and reprocessing for the fledgling nuclear power industry.

Skelly was among the leading oil companies to develop a network of truck stops along major highways including the interstate during the 1950s and 1960s. Skelly also had a contract to sell gasoline at most locations of the now-defunct Nickerson Farms restaurant chain during the 1960s and 1970s, which was similar to Texaco's arrangement with Stuckey's.

== Arts sponsorship ==
The company was well known as a sponsor of the radio drama series The Air Adventures of Jimmie Allen and Captain Midnight. Skelly also sponsored Alex Dreier news broadcasts on ABC radio from Chicago in the late 1940s and early 1950s.

== Getty takeover ==
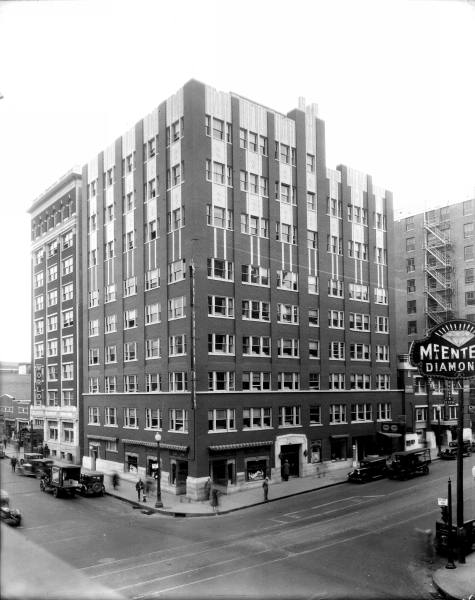
Skelly Building in Tulsa, Oklahoma, demolished later by the Tulsa World newspaper company for a parking lot.

William Skelly lost control of the company to J. Paul Getty in the 1930s, when the Great Depression put Skelly in a financial strain. To reduce the payroll, the company transferred some of its employees to Tidewater Associated Oil Company, which was controlled by J. Paul Getty and his mother, Sarah C. Getty. In the late 1930s these employees were transferred back to Skelly. The Gettys made a cash loan to Skelly Oil, and the company treasury held stock, and some of Mr. Skelly's stock was given as collateral for the loan. When the company was unable to repay the loan when it became due, the stock was transferred to Mission Corporation, a Getty holding company that also controlled Tidewater.

Skelly remained as CEO until his death in 1957, and Herndon remained executive vice president until his own death. Thereafter, Skelly executives remained as CEOs for another two decades.

In the late 1960s Tidewater became Getty Oil Company. Skelly Oil was eventually merged into Getty Oil in 1977 and the Skelly brand (and associated brands) were discontinued. Many former Skelly gas stations were rebranded to Getty, then to Texaco after Getty was acquired by Texaco in 1984.

== Revival ==
In 2012, Nimmons-Joliet Development Corp. acquired the rights to the Skelly brand logo and commenced operation of a new company utilizing the Skelly brand logo as a privately held company based in Texas.
