= Mayor of Los Angeles =

Chief executive of Los Angeles

Mayor of the City of Los Angeles
- Seal of Los Angeles

- Flag of Los Angeles

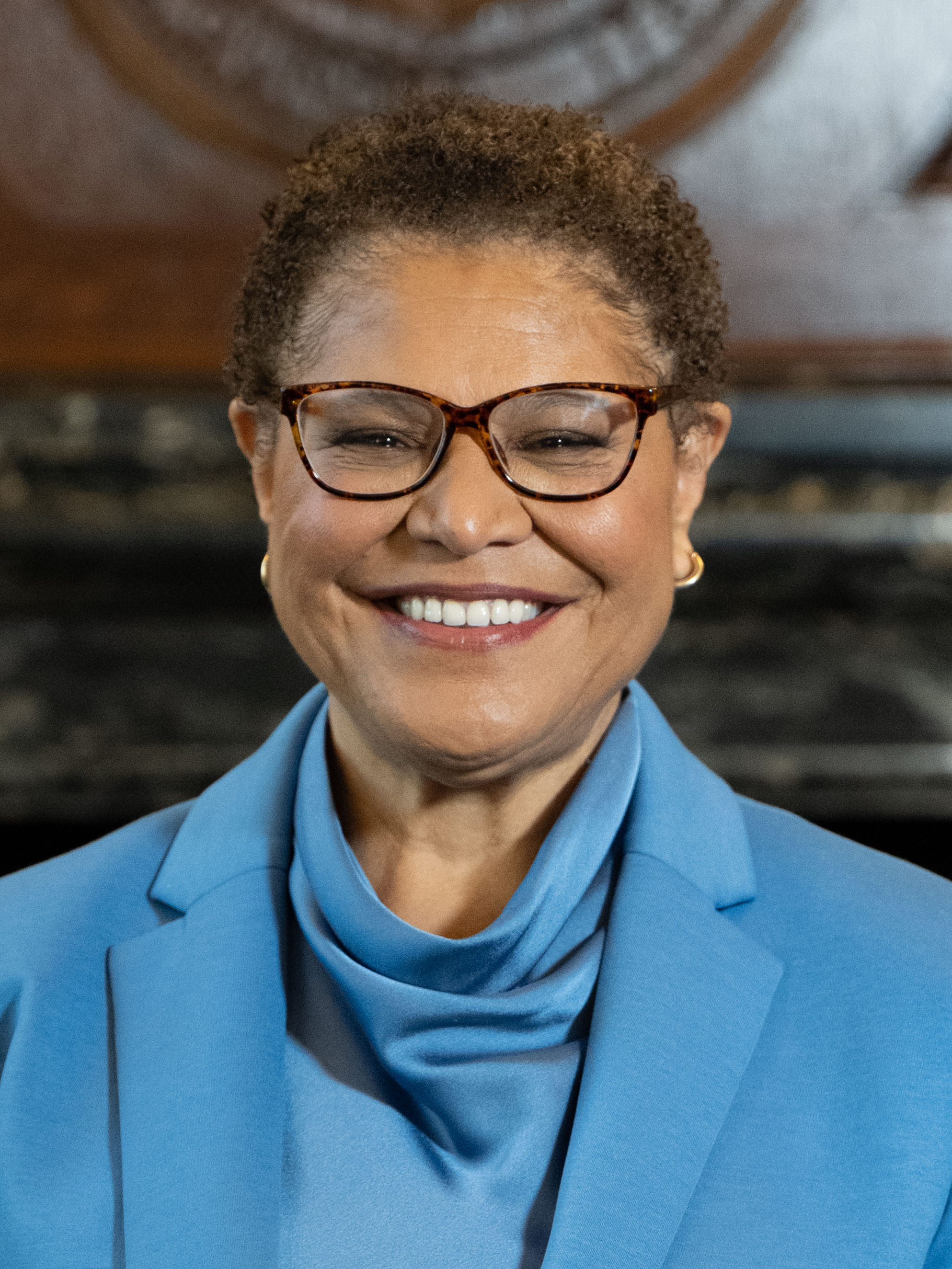
- Incumbent; Karen Bass since December 12, 2022
- Government of Los Angeles
- Style: Her Honor
- Residence: Getty House
- Term length: Four years (renewable once)
- Inaugural holder: Alpheus P. Hodges
- Formation: 1850
- Salary: $269,365
- Website: mayor.lacity.gov

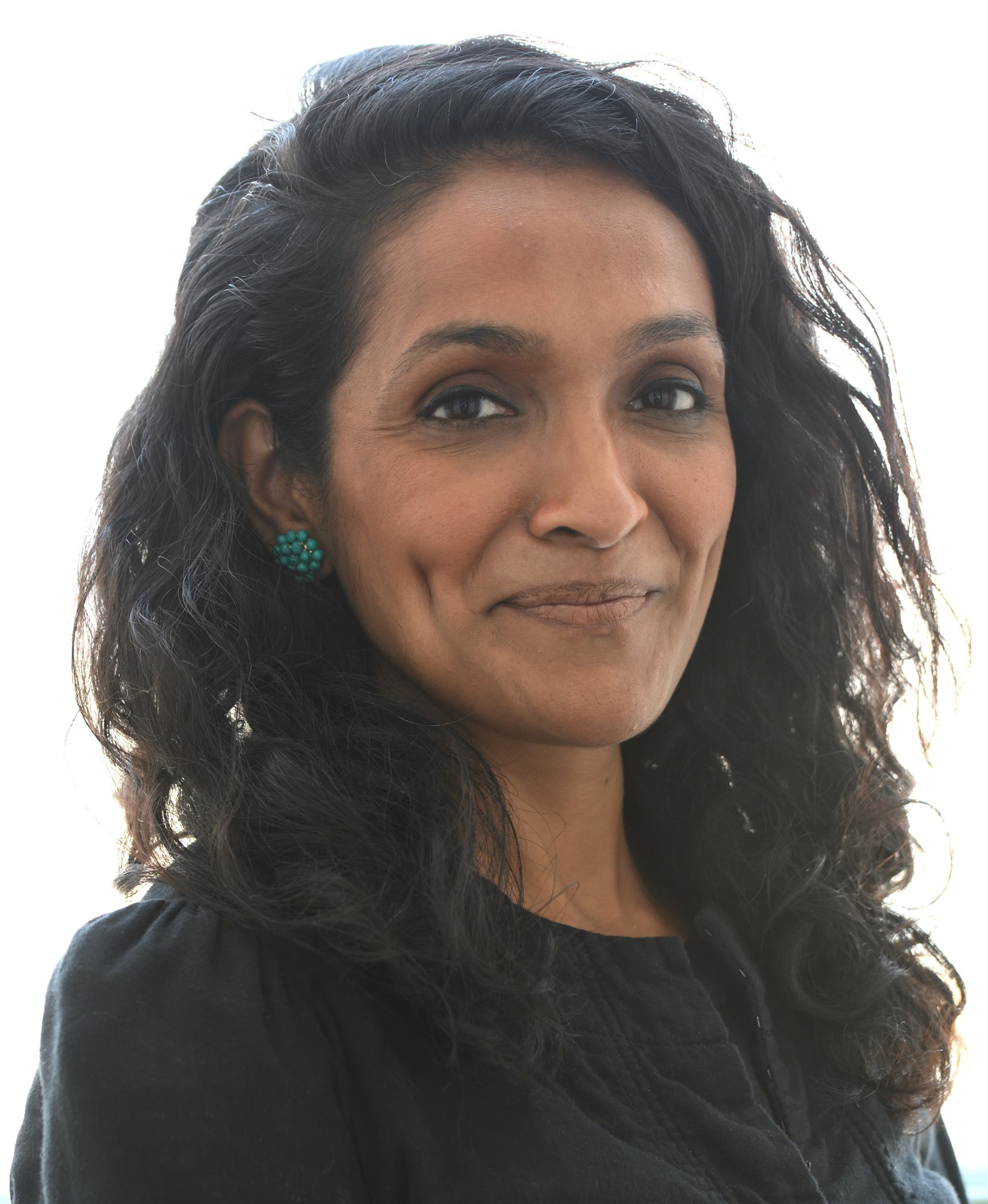
Mayor Elect Nithya Raman

The Mayor of Los Angeles is the head of the executive branch of the government of Los Angeles and the chief executive of Los Angeles. The office is officially nonpartisan, a change made in the 1909 charter; previously, both the elections and the office were partisan. Forty-two men and one woman have been mayor since 1850, when California became a state following the Treaty of Hidalgo. Between 1781 and the ceding and purchase of the territory, Californios, or settlers of the Mexican territory, served as alcalde, equivalent to mayor.

The current mayor is Karen Bass, who was elected on November 17, 2022, and took office on December 12, 2022. In the 2026 Los Angeles mayoral election, Nithya Raman advanced in the primary to challenge the incumbent, Karen Bass, and defeated Bass in the November general election.

== History ==
The office of Alcalde, the mayor of El Pueblo de la Reina de los Ángeles, was established in 1781 and elected annually without the right to reelection for two years. In 1841, the office of alcalde was abolished, instead being replaced by two Jueces de Paz (Justice of the peace). In 1844, the office of alcalde was restored but kept the two officials. When California was conquered and Los Angeles came under the United States, the office name was changed to Mayor.

== Powers ==
Los Angeles has a council form of government, giving the mayor the position of chief executive of the city. The mayor appoints general managers and commissioners, removes officials from city posts, and proposes a yearly budget. Most of the mayor's appointments and proposals are subject to approval by the City Council. The mayor also has the power to veto or approve certain City Council actions, though the City Council can override the Mayor's veto with a two-thirds vote.

The organization of the mayor's office changes with each new administration, but is almost always governed by a chief of staff, deputy chief of staff, director of communications, and several deputy mayors. Each mayor organizes their office into different offices, usually containing the Los Angeles Housing Team, Los Angeles Business Team, International Trade Office, Mayor's Volunteer Corps, and Office of Immigrant Affairs, among other divisions.

The mayor has an office in the Los Angeles City Hall and resides at the mayor's mansion, Getty House, located in Windsor Square. As of 2020, the mayor received a salary of $248,141.

== Succession ==
The mayor is subject to recall by registered voters if at least 15 percent of eligible voters sign a recall petition within 120 days of the first day of circulation. If the petition is successful, a special election is held asking whether the incumbent should be removed and who among a list of candidates should replace the incumbent. If the recall is successful, the replacement candidate with the majority of votes succeeds the ousted incumbent. If no replacement candidate receives a majority of the votes, a special runoff election is held between the top two candidates.

If the mayor resigns, the City Charter gives the Los Angeles City Council the power to appoint an interim mayor through the end of the term and/or the power to call a special election.

== Elections ==
The mayor is elected to a four-year term, with a limit of two consecutive terms, and is officially nonpartisan by state law, although most mayoral candidates identify a party preference.

The mayor is elected in a citywide election and follows a two-round system. The first round of the election is called the primary election, with the candidate receiving a majority of the vote in the primary is elected outright. If no candidate receives a majority, the top two candidates advance to a runoff election, called the general election. The city charter allows for write-in candidates for the primary election, but not for the runoff in the general election.

Elections for mayor were held in odd-numbered years from 1909 until 2017. In October 2014, the Los Angeles City Council recommended consolidating city elections with gubernatorial and presidential elections in even-numbered years in an effort to increase turnout. On March 3, 2015, voters passed a charter amendment to extend the term of the mayor elected in 2017 to five and a half years. From 2022 and onward, mayoral elections will be consolidated with the statewide gubernatorial elections held every four years. In November 2022, Karen Bass defeated businessman Rick Caruso.

In the 2026 Los Angeles mayoral election, Nithya Raman advanced in the primary to challenge the incumbent, Karen Bass, and defeated Bass in the November general election.

== See also ==
- History of Los Angeles
- Timeline of Los Angeles
- Los Angeles City Council
- President of the Los Angeles City Council
- List of mayors of Los Angeles
