= George Getty =

American oil pioneer (1855–1930)

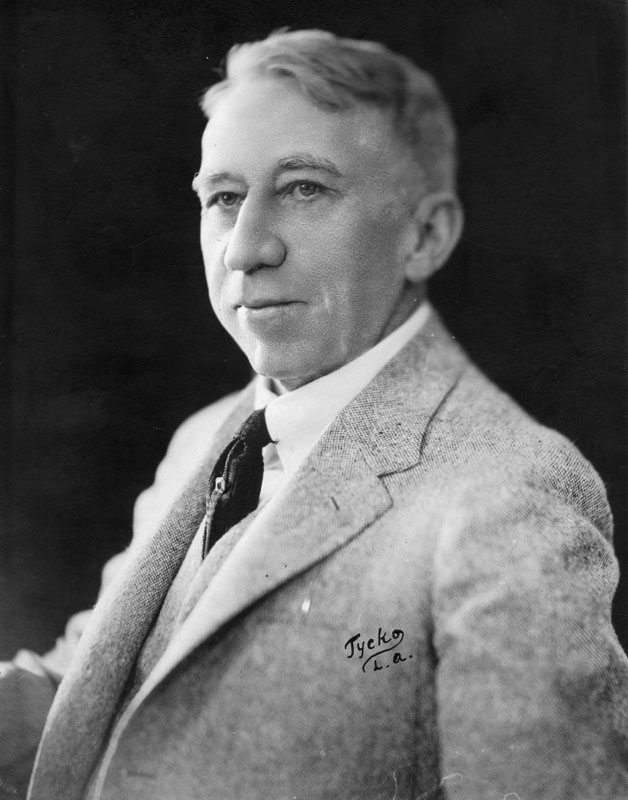
- George Getty, c. 1923
- Born: George Franklin Getty; October 17, 1855; Allegany County, Maryland, United States
- Died: May 31, 1930 (aged 74); Los Angeles, California, United States
- Resting place: Forest Lawn Memorial Park (Glendale)
- Education: Ohio Northern University (BS); University of Michigan (JD)
- Occupation: Businessman
- Known for: Getty Oil
- Spouse: Sarah Catherine McPherson Risher
- Children: J. Paul Getty
- Family: Getty

George Franklin Getty (October 17, 1855 – May 31, 1930) was an American lawyer, pioneer oilman, father of industrialist J. Paul Getty, and patriarch of the wealthy Getty family.

== Life and career ==
Getty was born in 1855 in Allegany County, Maryland, to Martha Ann (Wily) and John Getty (1835-1861), who was the son of James Getty and the grandson of another John Getty, a Presbyterian Ulster Scots peasant who immigrated to America and claimed kinship with the namesake of Gettysburg, Pennsylvania. However, Robert Lenzner wrote in his book The Great Getty that Gettysburg was founded by the Gettys family, not Getty. Shortly after his birth Getty's family moved from Maryland to Ohio where his father died in 1861. George was forced to work at a young age until his uncle, Joseph Getty, provided funds for him to attend school. He earned a Bachelor of Science from Ohio Northern University in 1879.

Eventually, Getty married and attended law school at the University of Michigan Law School and was admitted to the bar. In 1884, George F. Getty moved to Minneapolis, Minnesota where he specialized in insurance and corporate law and made a good living in what was the "flour capital" of America. In 1890, his first child, a daughter, died in a typhoid epidemic that hit the city. In 1892, the Gettys had another child, a son, Jean Paul Getty (later known as J. Paul Getty).

In 1904, the Gettys moved from Minnesota to Oklahoma, where George began a career as an independent oilman. Within two years, he had amassed a fortune from his Minnehoma Oil Company and moved his family to Los Angeles, California. In 1913, George lent his son Jean Paul (then aged 21) money to invest in oil wells. By 1915, Jean Paul had made his first million and the following year George and Jean Paul incorporated the Getty Oil Company, later to become Getty Oil.

George never approved of Jean Paul's lifestyle. Perhaps this is why he did not leave the company in the sole control of his son. George F. Getty died in 1930. He left his estate, in the form of the controlling interest in the family firm "George F. Getty, Inc.", and valued at between $10 million and $15 million U.S. ($192.73 million and $289.09 million, respectively, in 2025), to his wife Sarah, although Jean Paul Getty became President of the firm.

== George Getty II ==
Jean Paul Getty's eldest son, George Franklin Getty's grandson, was named George Franklin Getty II (1924–1973). He was an executive in the Getty Oil company until his death, which the L.A. County coroner ruled a probable suicide. His residence, Getty House, was then donated to the city, and became the official residence of the serving Mayor of Los Angeles.
