= The Canterville Ghost (Getty opera) =

The Canterville Ghost is a one-act opera by Gordon Getty to the composer's own libretto after the 1887 short story by Oscar Wilde. The opera was first performed in 2015 at Leipzig Opera, with Matthias Foremny conducting the Gewandhaus Orchestra. It was performed as a pair with his opera Usher House at the Center for Contemporary Opera in New York in August 2017.

== Recording ==
- Alexandra Hutton (soprano), Jean Broekhuizen (mezzo-soprano), Denise Wernly (mezzo-soprano), Rachel Marie Hauge (mezzo-soprano), Timothy Oliver (tenor), Jonathan Michie (baritone), Anooshah Golesorkhi (baritone), Matthew Trevino (bass) Leipzig Opera and Gewandhausorchester, Matthias Foremny. 1 SACD Pentatone
