= Cynthia Beck =

American businesswoman

- Occupation: Businesswoman
- Partner(s): Gordon Getty; Girard Damien Saenz
- Children: 3 daughters

Cynthia Beck is an American businesswoman, who was the long-term mistress of Gordon Getty, had three children with him, and is a major property owner in the Los Angeles area.

== Personal life ==
Beck had three daughters with Gordon Getty.

In August 1999, Getty's "secret second family" in Los Angeles became public knowledge as a result of Cynthia Beck having a court hearing on behalf of her three daughters, seeking the possibility for them to change their surname to Getty and be able to seek to claim a share in the Getty family fortune.

In 2019, it was reported that her "longtime companion" was Girard Damien Saenz, with whom she co-owned some properties.

== Property ownership ==
Beck owns at least 20 houses in the Los Angeles area, with many of the homes in run-down or derelict condition. She owns an "abandoned" beachfront house at Paradise Cove in Malibu, next to the home of John McEnroe and his wife Patty Smyth, bought from Getty in September 1991 for $3 million.

Beck owns a "neglected" three-acre estate in Beverly Hills. She owns a four-bedroom house in West Sunset Boulevard jointly with Girard Damien Saenz.

== Legal issues ==
In May 2019, police raided a house that Beck owns in Bel-Air and arrested her "longtime companion" Girard Damien Saenz, and seized over 1,000 guns. 30 law enforcement personnel needed over 12 hours to remove all the weapons.
