= Gordon Getty =

American heir and composer (born 1933)

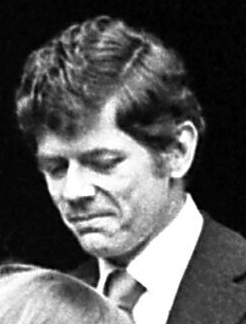
- Getty in 1976
- Born: Gordon Peter Getty; December 20, 1933 (age 92); Los Angeles, California, U.S.
- Education: University of San Francisco; San Francisco Conservatory of Music
- Occupations: Businessman, composer
- Spouse: Ann Gilbert (m. 1964; died 2020)
- Children: 7, including Andrew and Kendalle
- Parent(s): J. Paul Getty; Ann Rork Light
- Family: Getty

Gordon Peter Getty (born December 20, 1933) is an American businessman and classical music composer as well as a scion of the wealthy Getty family. Gordon was the fourth child of the oil tycoon, J. Paul Getty. His mother, Ann Rork, was J. Paul's fourth wife. When his father died in 1976, Gordon assumed control of Getty's $2 billion trust. In March 2026, the Bloomberg Billionaires Index estimated his wealth as $8.15 billion and placed him at number 463 on their list of billionaires worldwide, while the Forbes 400 estimated it at $5.5 billion, making him number 276 on their list of the wealthiest Americans.

== Early life ==
Getty was raised in San Francisco, California, where he attended St. Ignatius College Preparatory and the University of San Francisco. He also earned a B.A. in music from the San Francisco Conservatory of Music. He studied singing with Verna Osborne.

== Career ==
Getty joined the oil business to please his father; however, he eventually sold the family's Getty Oil to Texaco in 1986 for about $10 billion.

In 2002, Getty founded ReFlow, a company which temporarily purchases shares in mutual funds to save funds taxes and commissions.

=== Classical music ===
Among several professions, Getty is a classical music composer whose compositions include the opera Plump Jack, Joan and the Bells, piano pieces, and a collection of choral works. His one-act opera Usher House was performed by the San Francisco Opera in 2015. His opera The Canterville Ghost was premiered on May 9, 2015, at the Leipzig Opera.

Aspiring to become an opera singer, Getty studied in the mid-1970s with Louise Caselotti, a mezzo-soprano who had been Maria Callas' voice teacher (1946–47). He and his wife have supported the fine arts, especially underwriting productions of the San Francisco Opera and the Russian National Orchestra.

== Personal life ==
On Christmas Day, 1964, he married Ann Gilbert (1941–2020) in Las Vegas, Nevada. Gordon and Ann Getty lived in a yellow Italianate mansion in the Pacific Heights neighborhood of San Francisco, with sweeping views of the Golden Gate Bridge and Alcatraz. Over the years, Getty and Ann, a publisher and a decorator, expanded their living space, buying the house next door (to make room for his work at the piano) and then the house next door to that. They hosted charity events, opera stars, and fundraisers for politicians, including Kamala Harris and Gavin Newsom. Gavin Newsom's father, William Newsom, one of Gordon's friends since high school, managed the family trust for years.

Gordon and Ann Getty had four sons: Gordon Peter Getty Jr (born 1965); William Paul Getty (born 1970); Andrew Rork Getty (1967–2015); John Gilbert Getty (1968–2020).

Getty's assets are managed by Vallejo Investments. Vallejo Investments is what's known as a "family office," an in-house financial team of specialized attorneys, accountants, and money managers.

Getty has a second family based in Los Angeles, including three daughters, with his former longtime mistress Cynthia Beck.

His donations to University of San Francisco helped build the Koret Health & Recreation Center, John Lo Schiavo, S.J. Center for Science & Innovation, and helped establish the J. Paul Getty Honors College Fund.

In documents released in 2026, emails indicated that biologist Robert Trivers introduced Getty to Jeffrey Epstein in 2013 and that Getty and Epstein subsequently corresponded and met. In a 2018 email to Epstein, Trivers attributed to Getty a comment comparing publicity surrounding Getty’s extramarital family with Epstein’s own legal scandal. The available correspondence continued through 2019, although the extent of their direct contact is unclear.

== In popular culture ==
Getty's life as a composer was chronicled in Peter Rosen's documentary Gordon Getty: There Will be Music, which premiered on February 5, 2016, at Cinema Village in New York City. It has been broadcast on PBS in the U.S. and Europe on ARTE, as well as film festivals and programs across the country.

== Honors and awards ==
- 1986 – Outstanding American Composer, John F. Kennedy Center for the Performing Arts
- 2003 – Gold Baton, League of American Orchestras
- 2015 – University of San Francisco Alumnus of the Year
- 2023 – San Francisco Conservatory of Music Dinner in his Honor

== List of works ==
Opera

- The Canterville Ghost
- Usher House
- Plump Jack
- Goodbye, Mr. Chips

Cantata

- Joan and the Bells

Chamber works

- Four Traditional Pieces
- Homework Suite
- Kathie Trio

Choral works

- Annabel Lee
- Ballet Russe
- Beauty Come Dancing
- Cynara
- The Destruction of Sennacherib
- For a Dead Lady
- Four Christmas Carols
- Gretchen to Faust
- Impenitent Ultima
- La Belle Dame sans Merci
- The Little Match Girl
- Mephistopheles to Faust
- The Old Man in the Night
- The Old Man in the Morning
- The Old Man in the Snow
- A Prayer for My Daughter
- There Was A Naughty Boy
- Those Who Love the Most
- Three Welsh Songs
- St. Christopher
- Victorian Scenes
- Young America

Orchestral works

- Ancestor Suite
- Four Traditional Pieces
- Homework Suite
- Overture to Plump Jack
- Raise the Colors

Voice and Orchestra

- Cyanara
- The Destruction of Sennacherib
- Four Dickinson Songs
- Gretchen to Faust
- Hostess’s Aria
- Kathie’s Aria
- Mephistopheles to Faust
- No, My Good Lord
- Poor Peter
- A Prayer for my Daughter
- Where is My Lady?

Solo Instrument

- Spring Song (for cello)
- Ninna Nanna (for cello)
- Winter Song (for cello)

Piano works

- Ancestor Suite
- Andantino
- First Adventure
- Four Traditional Pieces
- Homework Suite
- Scherzo Pensieroso
- Tiefer und Tiefer

Songs

- Four Dickinson Songs
- Poor Peter
- A Prayer for My Daughter
- The White Election

Arrangements of existing works

- All Through the Night – chorus and eight cellos
- Danny Boy – voice and piano/voice and orchestra
- Deep River – voice and piano/voice, chorus and orchestra
- Silent Night – chorus and orchestra
- Shenandoah – chorus and orchestra

== Discography ==
- Goodbye, Mr. Chips (2025, Pentatone PTC 5187050)
- An American Song Album (2019, Pentatone PTC 5186770)
- Beauty Come Dancing (2018, Pentatone PTC 5186621)
- A Certain Slant of Light (2018, Pentatone PTC 5186634)
- The Canterville Ghost (2017, Pentatone PTC 5186541)
- Out of the Shadows: Rediscovered American Art Song (2016, Pentatone PTC 5186572)
- The Little Match Girl (2015, Pentatone PTC 5186480)
- December Celebration: New Carols by Seven American Composers (2015, Pentatone PTC 5186537)
- Usher House (2013, Pentatone PTC 5186451)
- Piano Pieces (2013, Pentatone PTC 5186505)
- The Hours Begin to Sing (2013, Pentatone PTC 5186459)
- Orchestral Works (2010, Pentatone PTC 5186356)
- Plump Jack (2012, Pentatone PTC 5186445)
- The White Election (2009, Pentatone PTC 5186054)
- And if the song be worth a smile (2008, Pentatone PTC 5186099)
- Young America Choral Works (2005, Pentatone PTC 5186040)
- Joan and the bells & Serge Prokofiev – Romeo and Juliet (2003, Pentatone PTC 5186017)
