= Getty Oil =

American petroleum company (1928–1984)

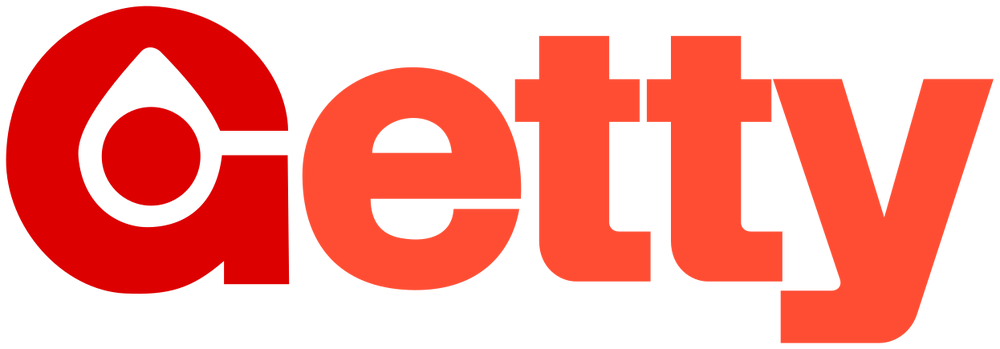
- Formerly: Pacific Western Oil Corporation (1928–1956)
- Type: Private
- Industry: Petroleum
- Founded: November 10, 1928; 97 years ago
- Defunct: 2012; 14 years ago
- Fate: Bankruptcy
- Headquarters: Getty Building, Los Angeles, California
- Number of locations: 1,115 (2011)
- Total assets: US$50–100 billion (2011)
- Number of employees: 597 (2012)
- Subsidiaries: Gasway Inc., Getty Terminals Corp., PT Petro Corp.
- Website: gettyoil.com

Getty Oil Company was an American oil marketing company with its origins as part of the large integrated oil company founded by J. Paul Getty. It went defunct in 2012.

== History ==
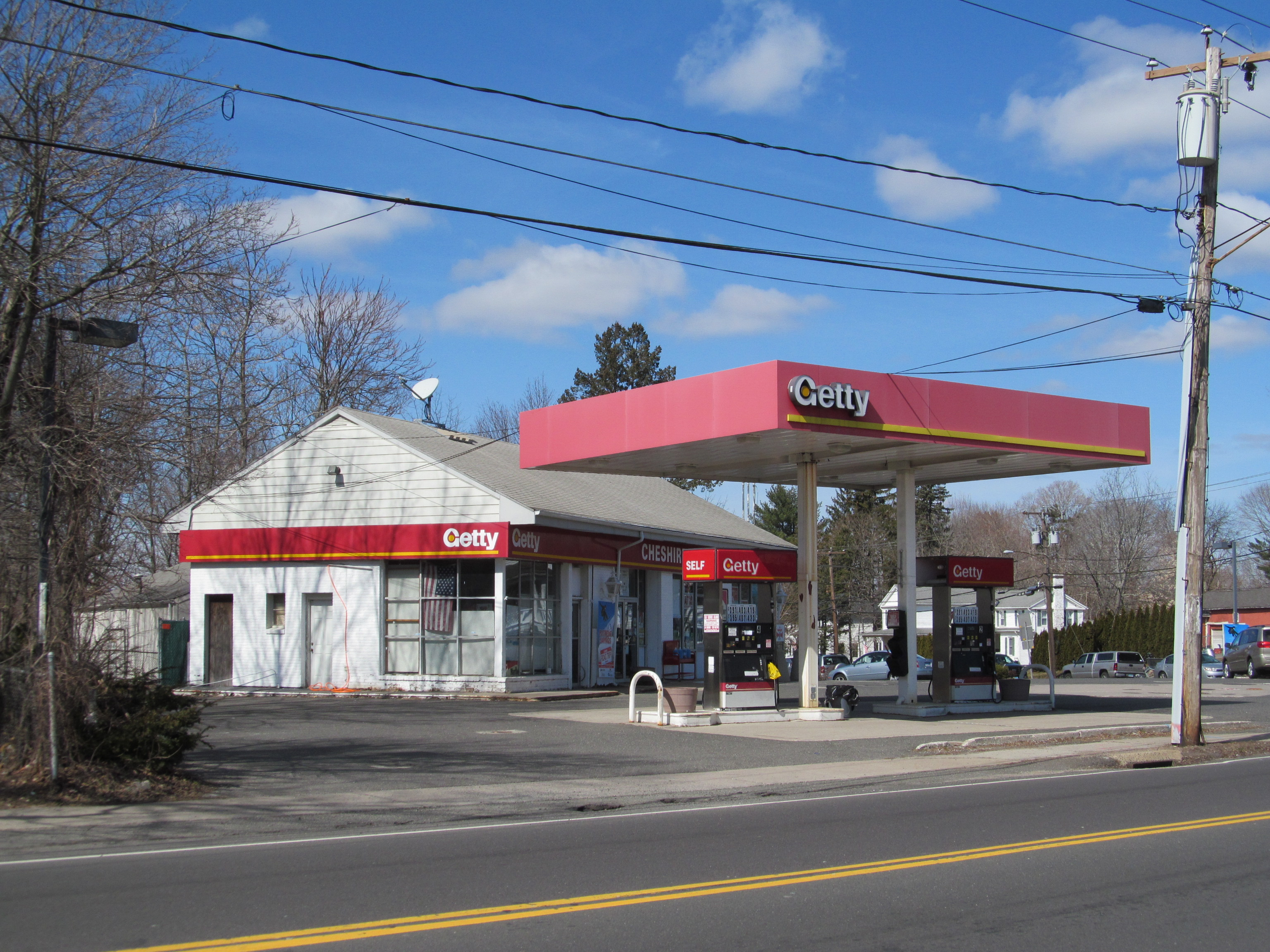
A Getty roadside gasoline station in Cheshire, Connecticut (2011)

J. Paul Getty incorporated Getty Oil in 1942. He had previously worked in the oil fields of Oklahoma along with his father George Getty. When George died, he left J. Paul with $500,000 and a projection that he would destroy the family business.

Starting in 1949, J. Paul Getty negotiated a 30-year concession in the neutral zone between Saudi Arabia and Kuwait. Gordon Getty and his family inherited a 40% interest in the company when J. Paul Getty died in 1976.

In 1984, after entering into a binding agreement to sell Getty and its 2.3-billion-barrel stockpile of proven oil reserves to Pennzoil, Gordon Getty struck a dramatic deal to sell the company to Texaco.

On November 19, 1985, in the case of Texaco, Inc. v. Pennzoil, Co., Pennzoil won a US$10.53 billion verdict against Texaco in the largest civil verdict in U.S. history as a result of the violation of the binding agreement. Following extensive litigation seeking to overturn the verdict, Texaco filed for bankruptcy, after which Pennzoil agreed to settle the case for $3 billion.

While the reserves were sold, only some of the refineries changed hands, and Getty continued to exist as a downstream entity. Getty gas stations in the Northeast were sold off as a condition of the buyout. The company became known as Getty Petroleum Marketing Inc.

In 1997, Getty Petroleum spun off a new company of its petroleum marketing and distribution segments. This new unit was sold to Lukoil in 2000, and Lukoil sold it to Cambridge Securities LLC in February 2011. Getty Petroleum filed for bankruptcy protection (Chapter 11) on December 5, 2011.

Getty Oil was an early investor in ESPN and had a controlling stake in 1979. Texaco sold the company to ABC in 1984.

== Leadership ==
=== President ===
1. William C. McDuffie, 1929–1932
2. H. Paul Grimm, 1932–1937
3. William Grove Skelly, 1937–1947
4. D. T. Staples, 1947–1948
5. Jean Paul Getty, 1948–1976
6. Harold E. Berg, 1976–1979
7. Sidney R. Petersen, 1979–1980
8. Robert N. Miller, 1980–1984

=== Chairman of the Board ===
1. Harold E. Berg, 1979–1980
2. Sidney R. Petersen, 1980–1984
