= J. Paul Getty =

American industrialist (1892–1976)

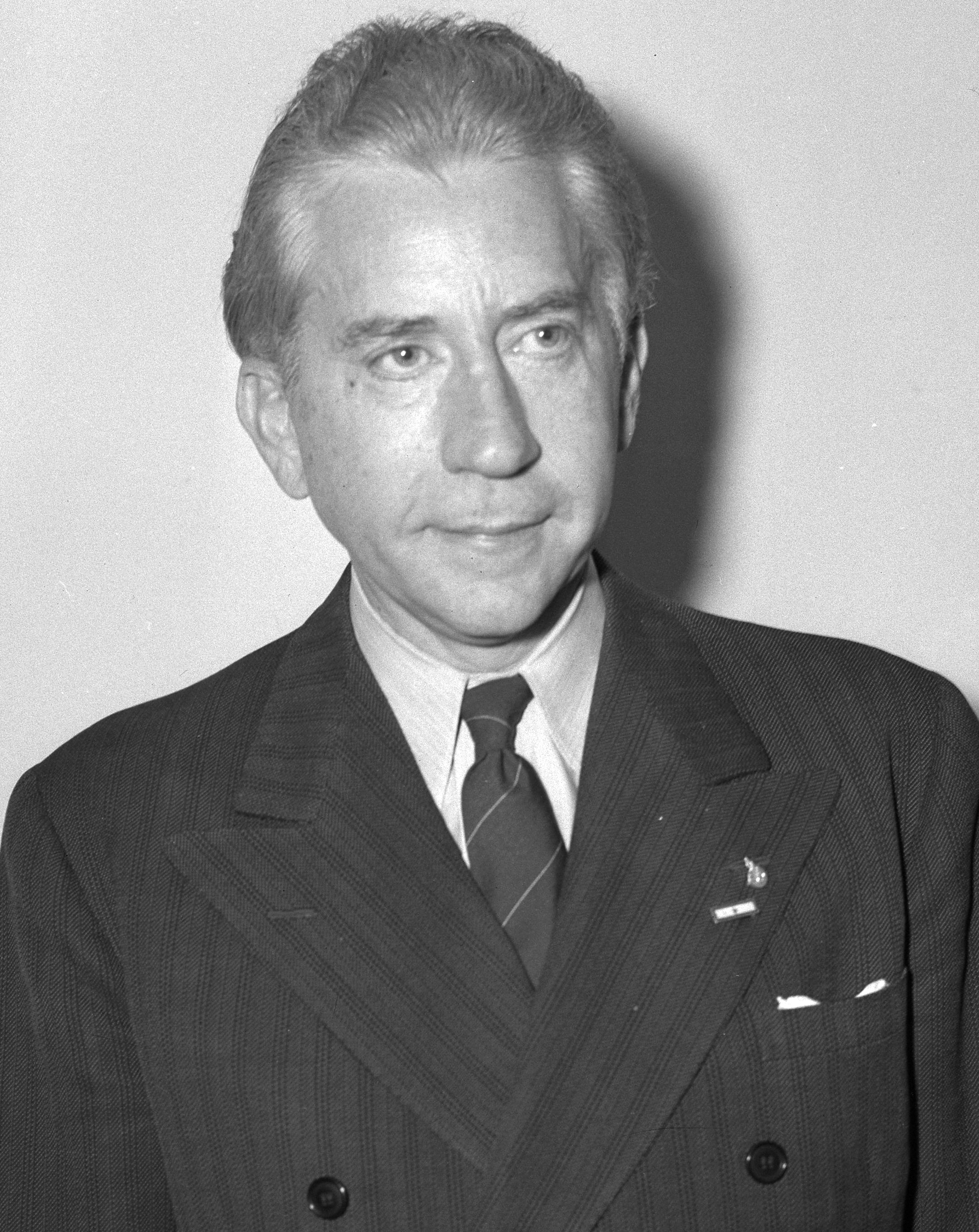
- Getty in 1944
- Born: Jean Paul Getty; December 15, 1892; Minneapolis, Minnesota, U.S.
- Died: June 6, 1976 (aged 83); Woking, Surrey, England
- Burial place: Getty Villa; Los Angeles, California
- Education: Magdalen College, Oxford
- Occupation: Businessman
- Spouses: Jeanette Demont (m. 1923; div. 1926) Allene Ashby (m. 1926; div. 1928) Adolphine Helmle (m. 1928; div. 1932) Ann Rork (m. 1932; div. 1936) Louise Dudley "Teddy" Lynch (m. 1939; div. 1958)
- Partners: Lady Ursula d'Abo; Mary Teissier; Rosibel Burch Martínez; Penelope Kitson
- Children: 5, including John and Gordon
- Father: George Getty

Jean Paul Getty Sr. (/ˈɡɛti/; December 15, 1892 – June 6, 1976) was an American petroleum industrialist who founded the Getty Oil Company in 1942 and was the longtime patriarch of the Getty family. A native of Minneapolis, Minnesota, he was the son of pioneer oilman George Getty. In 1957, Fortune magazine named J. Paul Getty the wealthiest living American, while the 1966 Guinness Book of Records declared him to be the world's wealthiest private citizen, worth an estimated $1.2 billion (approximately $9.1 billion in 2025). At the time of his death, he was worth more than $6 billion (approximately $26 billion in 2025). A book published in 1996 ranked him as the 67th wealthiest American who ever lived (based on his wealth as a percentage of the concurrent gross national product).

Getty was known for his frugality, going so far as to haggle with the kidnappers when his grandson was held to ransom in 1973. He had five children and divorced five times. Getty was an avid collector of art and antiquities. His collection formed the basis of the J. Paul Getty Museum in Los Angeles; more than $661 million of his estate was left to the museum after his death. He established the J. Paul Getty Trust in 1953. The trust, which is the world's wealthiest art institution, operates the J. Paul Getty Museum Complexes: the Getty Center, the Getty Villa and the Getty Foundation, the Getty Research Institute, and the Getty Conservation Institute.

== Background ==
Getty was born in Minneapolis to Sarah Catherine McPherson (Risher) and George Franklin Getty, who was an attorney in the insurance industry. He grew up as a Methodist; his father was a devout Christian Scientist and both his father and mother were strict teetotalers. Jean was of part Scottish descent. In 1903, when Jean was 10 years old, his father traveled to Bartlesville, Oklahoma, and bought the mineral rights for 1,100 acres (450 hectares) of land. The Getty family then moved to Bartlesville, where J. Paul Getty attended the Garfield School. Within a few years Getty had established wells on the land which produced 100,000 barrels (16,000 cubic meters) of crude oil a month.

As newly minted millionaires, the family moved to Los Angeles, but J. Paul Getty later returned to Oklahoma. At age 14, he attended the Harvard Military School for a year, followed by Polytechnic High School in Sun Valley, Los Angeles, studying reading. He became fluent in French, German and Italian, and conversational in Spanish, Greek, Arabic, and Russian. A love of the classics led Getty to acquire reading proficiency in ancient Greek and Latin.

Getty enrolled at the University of California, Berkeley, but did not complete a degree. Enamored by Europe after traveling abroad with his parents in 1910, he enrolled at the University of Oxford in Oxford, England, on November 28, 1912. A letter of introduction by President of the United States William Howard Taft enabled him to gain independent instruction from tutors at Magdalen College. Although he was not registered at Magdalen, he claimed the aristocratic students "accepted me as one of their own" and he fondly boasted of the friends he made, including the Prince of Wales, the future King Edward VIII of the United Kingdom.He obtained a diploma in economics and political science from Oxford in June 1913, then spent months traveling throughout Europe and Egypt before meeting his parents in Paris and returning with them to the U.S. in June 1914.

== Career ==
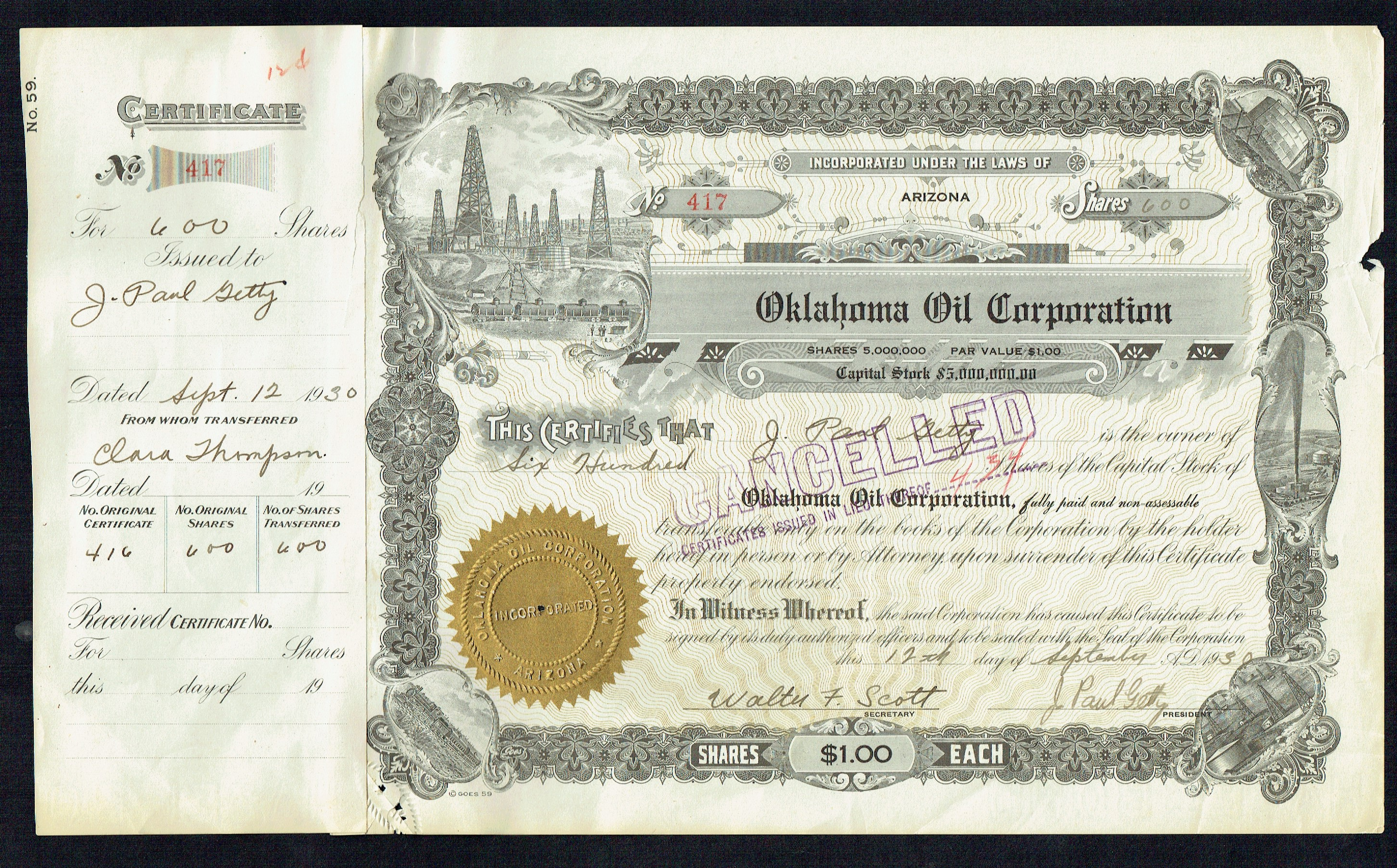
Share of the Oklahoma Oil Corp., issued on September 12, 1930, signed by President J. Paul Getty and owned by him

In the autumn of 1914, George Getty gave his son $10,000 (equivalent to $320,000 in 2025) to invest in expanding the family's oil field holdings in Oklahoma. The first lot he bought, the Nancy Taylor No. 1 Oil Well Site near Haskell, Oklahoma, was crucial to his early financial success. The well struck oil in August 1915 and by the next summer the 40 percent net production royalty he accrued from it had made him a millionaire.

In 1919, Getty returned to business in Oklahoma. During the 1920s, he added about $3 million to his already sizable estate. His succession of marriages and divorces so distressed his father that Getty inherited only $500,000 of the $10 million fortune his father left at the time of his death in 1930. Getty was left with one-third of the stock from George Getty Inc., while his mother received the remaining two-thirds, giving her a controlling interest.In 1936, Getty's mother convinced him to contribute to the establishment of a $3.3 million investment trust, called the Sarah C. Getty Trust, to ensure the family's ever-growing wealth could be channeled into tax-free, secure income for future generations of the Getty family. The trust enabled Getty to have easy access to ready capital, which he was funneling into the purchase of Tidewater Petroleum stock.

During the Great Depression, Getty acquired Pacific Western Oil Corporation and began the acquisition (completed in 1953) of the Mission Corporation which included Tidewater Oil and Skelly Oil. In 1967, Getty merged these holdings into Getty Oil. In 1948–49, Getty paid Ibn Saud $9.5 million in cash, guaranteed $1 million a year, and a royalty of 55 cents a barrel for the Saudi Arabian Neutral Zone concession, which was 2.5 times more than what other major oil companies were paying in the Middle East at the time. Oil was finally discovered in March 1953. Since 1953, Getty's gamble produced 16 million barrels (2.5 million cubic meters) a year, which contributed greatly to the fortune responsible for making him one of the richest people in the world.

The meek shall inherit the earth, but not its mineral rights.

— a dictum attributed to Jean Paul Getty

Getty's wealth and ability to speak Arabic enabled his unparalleled expansion into the Middle East. He owned the controlling interest in about 200 businesses, including Getty Oil. Getty owned Getty Oil, Getty Inc., George F. Getty Inc., Pacific Western Oil Corporation, Mission Corporation, Mission Development Company, Tidewater Oil, Skelly Oil, Mexican Seaboard Oil, Petroleum Corporation of America, Spartan Aircraft Company, Spartan Cafeteria Company, Minnehoma Insurance Company, Minnehoma Financial Company, Pierre Hotel, Pierre Marques Hotel, a 15th-century palace and nearby castle at Ladispoli on the coast northwest of Rome, a Malibu ranch home, and Sutton Place, a 72-room mansion near Guildford, Surrey.

=== Art collection ===
Getty's first forays into collecting began in the late 1930s, when he was inspired by the collection of 18th-century French paintings and furniture of the landlord of his New York City penthouse, Amy Guest, a relation of Sir Winston Churchill. A fan of 18th-century France, Getty began buying furniture from the period at reduced prices because of the depressed art market. He wrote several books on collecting, including Europe and the 18th Century (1949), Collector's Choice: The Chronicle of an Artistic Odyssey through Europe (1955) and The Joys of Collecting (1965). His stinginess limited the range of his collecting because he refused to pay full price. Getty's companion in later life, Penelope Kitson, said, "Paul was really too mean ever to allow himself to buy a great painting." Nonetheless, at the time of his death he owned more than 600 works valued at more than $4 million, including paintings by Rubens, Titian, Gainsborough, Renoir, Tintoretto, Degas, and Monet. Getty's reluctance to donate any more artworks to Los Angeles County after he realized how his first donations had been shabbily presented at the Los Angeles Museum of History, Science and Art caused Edward W. Carter to orchestrate the fundraising effort for the Los Angeles County Museum of Art. During the 1950s, Getty's interests shifted to Greco-Roman sculpture, which led to the building of the Getty Villa in the 1970s to house the collection. These items were transferred to the Getty Museum and the Getty Villa in Los Angeles after his death.

== Marriages, divorces and children ==
Getty was a notorious womanizer from the time of his youth, which horrified his conservative parents. His lawyer, Robina Lund, once said, "Paul could hardly ever say 'no' to a woman, or 'yes' to a man." Lord Beaverbrook called him "priapic" and "ever-ready" in his sexual habits. In 1917, when he was 25, Elsie Eckstrom filed a paternity suit against Getty in Los Angeles, claiming he was the father of her daughter. Eckstrom said that Getty had taken her virginity while she was drunk and fathered the child. His legal team tried to undermine her credibility by claiming that she had a history of promiscuity. Getty agreed to a settlement of $10,000 ($251,299 in 2025), upon which Eckstrom left town with the baby.

Getty was married and divorced five times. He had five sons with four of his wives:

1. Jeanette Demont (married 1923 – divorced 1926); one son, George F. Getty II.
2. Allene Ashby (1926–1928); no children. Getty met 17-year-old Ashby, the daughter of a Texas rancher, in Mexico City while he was studying Spanish and overseeing his family's business interests. They eloped to Cuernavaca, Mexico, but the marriage was bigamous as he was not yet divorced from Jeanette. The two quickly decided to dissolve the union while still in Mexico.
3. Adolphine Helmle (1928–1932); one son whose son, Christopher Ronald Getty, married Pia Miller, sister of Marie-Chantal, Crown Princess of Greece. Like his first and second wives, Adolphine was 17 when Getty met her in Vienna. She was the daughter of a prominent German doctor who opposed her marriage to the twice-divorced, 36-year-old Getty. The two eloped to Cuernavaca, where he had married Ashby, then settled in Los Angeles. After their son was born, Getty lost interest in her and her father convinced her to return to Germany with their son in 1929. After a protracted and contentious battle, their divorce was finalized in August 1932, with Adolphine receiving a huge sum for punitive damages and full custody of their son.
4. Ann Rork (1932–1936); two sons, John Paul Getty Jr. and Gordon Peter Getty. Getty was introduced to Rork when she was 14, but she did not become his romantic partner until she was 21 in 1930. Because he was in the midst of his divorce from Adolphine, the couple had to wait two years to marry. He was largely absent during their marriage, staying for long stretches of time in Europe. She sued him for divorce in 1936, alleging emotional abuse and neglect. She described an incident while the two were abroad in Italy in which she claimed Getty forced her to climb to view the crater of Mount Vesuvius while she was pregnant with their first son. The court ruled in her favor and she was awarded $2,500 ($58,004 in 2025) per month in alimony plus $1,000 ($23,201 in 2025) for each child in child support for her sons.
5. Louise Dudley "Teddy" Lynch (1939–1958); one son. In 2013, at age 99, Getty's fifth wife, Louise, known as Teddy Getty Gaston, published a memoir recounting how Getty had scolded her for spending money too freely in the 1950s on the treatment of their six-year-old son who had become blind from a brain tumor. Their son died at age 12, and Getty, living in England apart from his family, who were in the U.S., did not attend the funeral. Gaston divorced Getty that year. She died in 2017 at the age of 103.

Getty was quoted as saying "A lasting relationship with a woman is only possible if you are a business failure" and "I hate to be a failure. I hate and regret the failure of my marriages. I would gladly give all my millions for just one lasting marital success."

== Kidnapping of grandson John Paul Getty III ==
In Rome on July 10, 1973, 'Ndrangheta kidnappers abducted Getty's 16-year-old grandson, John Paul Getty III, and demanded $17 million (equivalent to $123 million in 2025) for his safe return. The family suspected a ploy by the rebellious teenager to extract money from his miserly grandfather. John Paul Getty Jr. asked his father for the money, but was refused. In November 1973, an envelope containing a lock of hair and a human ear arrived at a daily newspaper. The second demand had been delayed three weeks by an Italian postal strike. The demand threatened that Paul would be further mutilated unless the victims paid $3.2 million. The demand stated: "This is Paul's ear. If we don't get some money within 10 days, then the other ear will arrive. In other words, he will arrive in little bits."

When the kidnappers reduced their demand to $3 million, Getty agreed to pay no more than $2.2 million (equivalent to $16 million in 2025), the maximum that would be tax-deductible. He lent his son the remaining $800,000 at four percent interest. Getty's grandson was found alive on December 15, 1973, in a Lauria filling station, in the province of Potenza, shortly after the ransom was paid. After his release, the younger Getty called his grandfather to thank him for paying the ransom but Getty refused to come to the phone.

Getty defended his initial refusal to pay the ransom on two grounds. He argued that his 13 other grandchildren could also become kidnapping targets if he paid and said: "The second reason for my refusal was much broader-based. I contend that acceding to the demands of criminals and terrorists merely guarantees the continuing increase and spread of lawlessness, violence and such outrages as terror-bombings, 'skyjackings' and the slaughter of hostages that plague our present-day world." Nine of the kidnappers were apprehended, including Marco Alphonso Grillo, John Vincent Latorre, Salvatore Pignataro, Girolamo Piromalli and Saverio Mammoliti, high-ranking members of the 'Ndrangheta, a Mafia organization in Calabria. Two of the kidnappers were convicted and sent to prison; the others were acquitted for lack of evidence, including the 'Ndrangheta bosses. Most of the ransom money was never recovered.

Getty III was permanently affected by the trauma and became a drug addict. After a stroke brought on by a cocktail of drugs and alcohol in 1981, he was rendered speechless, nearly blind, and partially paralyzed for the rest of his life. He died on February 5, 2011, at age 54.

== Reputation for frugality ==
Many anecdotal stories exist of Getty's thriftiness and parsimony, which struck observers as comical, even perverse, because of his extreme wealth. The two best known examples are his reluctance to pay his grandson's kidnapping ransom and a pay phone he had installed at Sutton Place. A darker incident was his fifth wife's claim that Getty scolded her for spending too much on their terminally ill son's medical treatment, though he was worth tens of millions of dollars at the time. He was well known for bargaining on almost everything to obtain the lowest possible price, including suites at luxury hotels and virtually all purchases of artwork and real estate. In 1959, he purchased Sutton Place, a 72-room mansion, from George Sutherland-Leveson-Gower, 5th Duke of Sutherland, for £60,000, about half of what the duke paid for it 40 years earlier.

- Getty's secretary claimed that Getty did his laundry by hand because he did not want to pay for his clothes to be laundered. When his shirts became frayed at the cuffs, he would trim the frayed parts rather than buy new shirts.
- Reusing stationery was another obsession of Getty's. He had a habit of writing responses to letters on the margins or back sides and mailing them back, rather than using a new sheet of paper. He also carefully saved and reused manila envelopes, rubber bands, and other office supplies.
- When Getty took a group of friends to a dog show in London, he made them walk around the block for 10 minutes until the tickets became half-priced at 5pm, because he did not want to pay the full 5 shillings per head.
- Getty moved to Sutton Place in part because the cost of living was cheaper than in London, where he had resided at the Ritz. He once boasted to American columnist Art Buchwald that it cost 10 cents for a rum and coke at Sutton Place, whereas at the Ritz it was more than a dollar.
- Getty drove his own car to work every day.

Author John Pearson attributed part of Getty's extreme penny-pinching to the Methodist sensibility of his upbringing, which emphasized modest living and personal economy. His business acumen was also a major factor in Getty's thriftiness. "He would allow himself no self-indulgence in the purchase of a place to live, a work of art, even a piece of furniture, unless he could convince himself that it would appreciate in value." Getty claimed his frugality toward others was a response to having been taken advantage of. "It's not the money I object to, it's the principle of the thing that bothers me", he said.

=== Coin-box telephone ===
Getty famously had a pay phone installed at Sutton Place, helping to seal his reputation as a miser. He placed dial locks on all the regular telephones, limiting their use to authorized staff, and the coin-box telephone was installed for others. In his autobiography, he described his reasons:

Now, for months after Sutton Place was purchased, great numbers of people came in and out of the house. Some were visiting businessmen. Others were artisans or workmen engaged in renovation and refurbishing. Still others were tradesmen making deliveries of merchandise. Suddenly, the Sutton Place telephone bills began to soar. The reason was obvious. Each of the regular telephones in the house has direct access to outside lines and thus to long-distance and even overseas operators. All sorts of people were making the best of a rare opportunity. They were picking up Sutton Place phones and placing calls to girlfriends in Geneva or Georgia and to aunts, uncles and third cousins twice-removed in Caracas and Cape Town. The costs of their friendly chats were, of course, charged to the Sutton Place bill.

In a 1963 televised interview with Alan Whicker, Getty said that he thought guests would want to use a pay phone. After 18 months, he said, "the in-and-out traffic flow at Sutton subsided. Management and operation of the house settled into a reasonable routine. With that, the pay telephone [was] removed, and the dial locks were taken off the telephones in the house."

== Later years and death ==
On June 30, 1960, Getty threw a 21st birthday party for a relative of his friend, the 16th Duke of Norfolk, which served as a housewarming party for the newly purchased Sutton Place. Partygoers were irritated by Getty's stinginess, such as not providing cigarettes and relegating everyone to using creosote portable toilets outside. At about 10 p.m. the party descended into pandemonium as party crashers arrived from London, swelling the already overcrowded halls and causing an estimated £20,000 in damage. A valuable silver ewer by the 18th century silversmith Paul de Lamerie was stolen, but returned anonymously when the London newspapers began covering the theft. The event's failure made Getty the object of ridicule and he never threw another large party. He remained an inveterate hard worker, boasting at age 74 that he often worked 16 to 18 hours per day overseeing his operations across the world. The value of Getty Oil shares quadrupled during the Arab-Israeli Yom Kippur War of 1973, which caused a worldwide oil shortage for years. Getty's earnings topped $25.8 million in 1975.

Getty met the English interior designer Penelope Kitson in the 1950s and entrusted her with decorating his homes and the public rooms of the oil tankers he was launching. From 1960, Kitson resided in a cottage on the grounds of Sutton Place. Getty and Kitson maintained a platonic relationship and Getty held her in high respect and trust.

Getty's insatiable appetite for sex also continued into his 80s. He used an experimental drug, H3, to maintain his potency. Mistresses who resided at Sutton Place included Mary Teissier, a distant cousin of Nicholas II, the last Emperor of Russia; Lady Ursula d'Abo, who had close connections to the British royal family; and American-Nicaraguan Rosibel Burch Martínez, great-granddaughter of president Tomás Martínez and a descendant of national heroine Rafaela Herrera. The New York Times wrote of Getty's domestic arrangement saying that he "ended his life with a collection of desperately hopeful women, all living together in his Tudor mansion in England, none of them aware that his favorite pastime was rewriting his will, changing his insultingly small bequests: $209 a month to one, $1,167 to another." Only Kitson received a significant bequest upon Getty's death: 5,000 shares of Getty Oil, which doubled in value during the 1980s, and a $1,167 monthly income.

On June 6, 1976, Getty died of heart failure at age 83 in Sutton Place.

== Media portrayals ==
Rudy De Luca portrayed Getty in the 1991 Mel Brooks film Life Stinks, in which Brooks plays a real estate tycoon who takes a bet that he can't live in the streets as a derelict for a month. Several times in the film he runs into a homeless man who claims to be Getty in a similar situation, but neither believes the other. It is never confirmed whether this character was supposed to actually be Getty or just a homeless person with a personality disorder, but he is credited as "J. Paul Getty".

Christopher Plummer portrayed Getty in the 2017 film All the Money in the World, which dramatizes his grandson's kidnapping. Getty was originally portrayed by Kevin Spacey, but after sexual misconduct allegations surfaced against Spacey before the film premiered, Plummer refilmed Spacey's scenes. For his performance, Plummer received an Academy Award nomination for Best Supporting Actor. The kidnapping is dramatized in the first season of the American anthology drama series Trust, in which Donald Sutherland portrays Getty.

In 1972, Getty himself appeared in a 30-second television commercial for the E.F. Hutton brokerage firm. Filmed at Sutton Place, the commercial ran on U.S. television for five years.

== Quotations ==
J. Paul Getty has one entry in the eighth edition of The Oxford Dictionary of Quotations: "If you can actually count your money, then you are not really a rich man."

== Published works ==
- Getty, J. Paul. The history of the bigger oil business of George F.S. F. and J. Paul Getty from 1903 to 1939. Los Angeles?, 1941, OCLC 693373380
- Getty, J. Paul. Europe in the Eighteenth Century. [Santa Monica, Calif.]: privately printed, 1949, OCLC 1539420
- Le Vane, Ethel, and J. Paul Getty. Collector's Choice: The Chronicle of an Artistic Odyssey through Europe. London: W.H. Allen, 1955, OCLC 901152222
- Getty, J. Paul. My Life and Fortunes. New York: Duell, Sloan & Pearce, 1963, OCLC 804426417
- Getty, J. Paul. The Joys of Collecting. New York: Hawthorn Books, 1965, OCLC 756465638
- Getty, J. Paul. How to be Rich. Chicago: Playboy Press, 1965, OCLC 702557306
- Getty, J. Paul. The Golden Age. New York: Trident Press, 1968, OCLC 3039906
- Getty, J. Paul. How to be a Successful Executive. Chicago: Playboy Press, 1971, OCLC 11409794
- Getty, J. Paul. As I See It: The Autobiography of J. Paul Getty. Englewood Cliffs, N.J. : Prentice-Hall, 1976. ISBN 0-13-049593-X, OCLC 1078950701

== See also ==
- List of richest Americans in history
