= The Blonde Saint =

1926 film

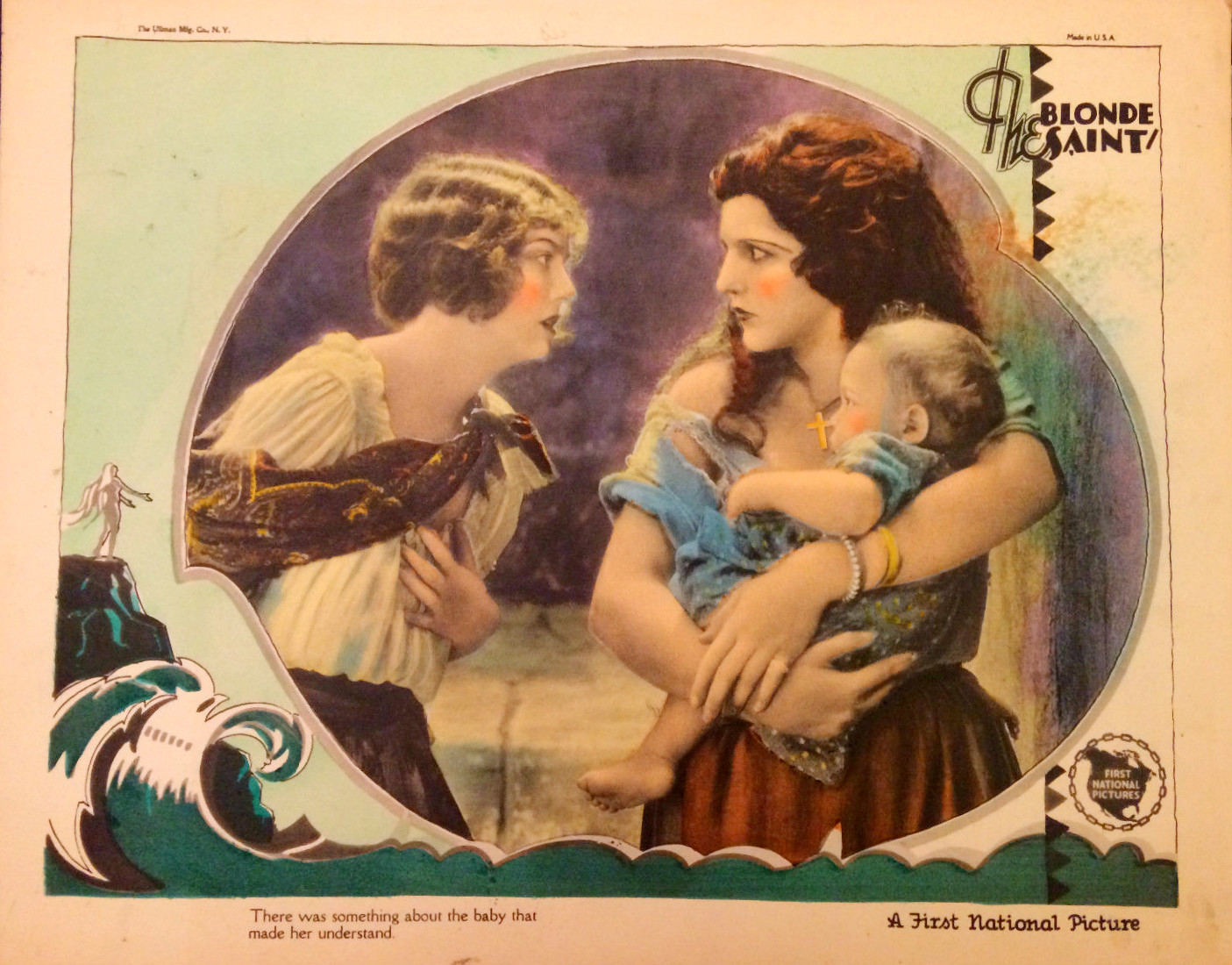
- Lobby card
- Directed by: Svend Gade
- Written by: Marion Fairfax (scenario)
- Based on: The Isle of Life by Stephen French Whitman
- Produced by: Sam E. Rork
- Starring: Lewis Stone; Doris Kenyon; Gilbert Roland
- Cinematography: Tony Gaudio
- Distributed by: First National Pictures
- Release date: November 20, 1926
- Running time: 70 minutes 7 reels (6,800 feet)
- Country: United States
- Language: Silent (English intertitles)

The Blonde Saint is a 1926 American silent romantic adventure film directed by Svend Gade. It was produced by Sam E. Rork and released through First National Pictures. Lewis Stone and Doris Kenyon star and young newcomer Gilbert Roland is featured.

The plot of the film bears a striking resemblance to the plot of the Warner Brothers talkie, One Way Passage (1932), although this silent film appears to have been more exotic.

== Plot ==
As described in a film magazine review, playboy Sebastian Maure has taken an interest in the prim and proper Ghirlaine "Anne" Bellamy, but she resists him as he has such a reputation, believed in nothing, and lived but to satisfy his own desires. Her better self tells her to go with the more virtuous Vincent Pamfort, and she finally tells Maure that she is going to leave to go to England to be with Pamfort. Maure gets her to go on a ship going to Palermo, and when near Sicily he grabs Anne and jumps overboard. They swim to a small island with a fishing village. They find that the village is suffering from a cholera plague. Maure devotes himself to the care of the poor. Anne, prompted by his self sacrifice, does her share of nursing and begins to wonder whether she is glad that Maure has promised to give her up. In answer to a letter from Maure, Pamfort arrives at the island, but now Anne elects to stay with Maure.

== Cast ==
- Lewis Stone as Sebastian Maure
- Doris Kenyon as Ghirlaine Bellamy
- Ann Rork as Fannia
- Gilbert Roland as Annibale
- Cesare Gravina as Ilario
- Malcolm Denny as Vincent Pamfort
- Albert Conti as Andreas
- Vadim Uraneff as Nino
- Lillian Langdon
- Leo White as Tito

== Music ==
- Tarantella, copyrighted by Carl Fischer Music
- Garden of Melody, copyrighted by Robbins Music
- Springtime, copyrighted by J. Sipskin
- Interrupted Rendez Vous, copyrighted by G. Schirmer, Inc.
- Entr'acte—Clarice, copyrighted by G. Sanders Co.
- Chanson Napolitaine, copyrighted by G. Schirmer, Inc.
- Tesoro Mio, copyrighted by Carl Fischer Music
- Carissime, copyrighted by R. Profeta and Co.

== Production ==
Producer Rork's 19-year-old daughter, Ann Rork, has a major role in the film as she has in her father's later produced The Notorious Lady (1927). Lewis Stone also returned in The Notorious Lady.

This was the final film of screenwriter Marion Fairfax. She and producer Rork had formed a partnership to make films in 1925, but, following the completion The Blonde Saint and a severe illness, she left film making and then wrote only for periodicals.

== Preservation ==
An abridged and or incomplete version of survives in the British Film Institute National Film and Television Archive, London.
