= Sam E. Rork =

American film producer

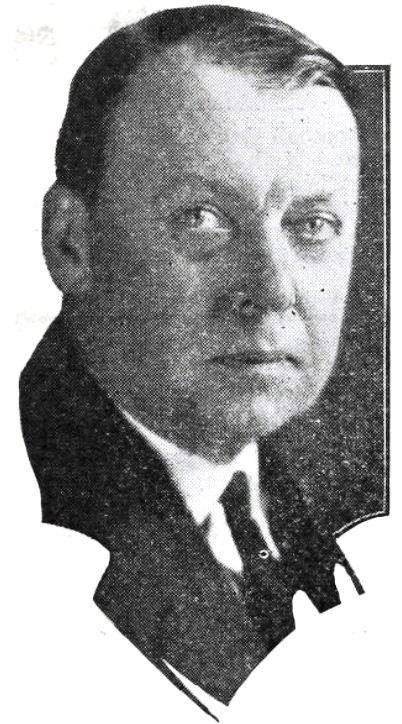
- From a 1925 film advertisement
- Born: Samuel Edwin Rork c. 1870; Albany, New York
- Died: July 24, 1933 (aged 62–63); Los Angeles, California
- Occupation: Film producer
- Spouse: Helen Welch
- Children: Ann Rork Light

Samuel Edwin Rork (c. 1870 – July 24, 1933) was an American silent film producer.

== Early life ==
Samuel Edwin Rork was born around 1870 in Albany, New York.

== Career ==
He started his career at Wallack's Theatre in New York City.

He moved to Los Angeles, California, with Mack Sennett, for whose company, Mack Sennett Enterprises, he worked. He later worked as a producer for First National. He then set up his own film producer company, Sam E. Rork Productions, and produced eight films.

He produced Clothes Make the Pirate in 1925. A year later, in 1926, he produced Old Loves and New and The Blonde Saint. In 1927, he produced The Notorious Lady, A Texas Steer, and The Prince of Headwaiters. In 1932, he was the associate producer of Call Her Savage.

== Personal life ==
He married Helen Welch. They had a daughter, Ann Rork, a silent actress. He died on July 24, 1933, in Hollywood, California.
