= The River (1925 play) =

1925 play by Patrick Hastings

- Original language: English
- Written by: Patrick Hastings
- Genre: Drama

Premiere
- Date: 2 June 1925
- Place: St James's Theatre, London

The River is a 1925 play by the British writer Patrick Hastings. It is set in West Africa, where two diamond hunters are in love with the same woman.

It ran for 53 performances in the West End, initially at St James's Theatre before transferring to the Lyric Theatre. The cast included Owen Nares, Clifford Mollison, Jessie Winter, Helen Ferrers, and Leslie Faber.

== Film adaptation ==
In 1927, it was adapted into an American silent film The Notorious Lady by Hollywood studio First National Pictures, starring Barbara Bedford and Lewis Stone.

== Bibliography ==
- Goble, Alan. The Complete Index to Literary Sources in Film. Walter de Gruyter, 1999.
- Wearing, J. P. The London Stage 1920-1929: A Calendar of Productions, Performers, and Personnel. Rowman & Littlefield, 2014.
