= Old Loves and New =

1926 film by Maurice Tourneur

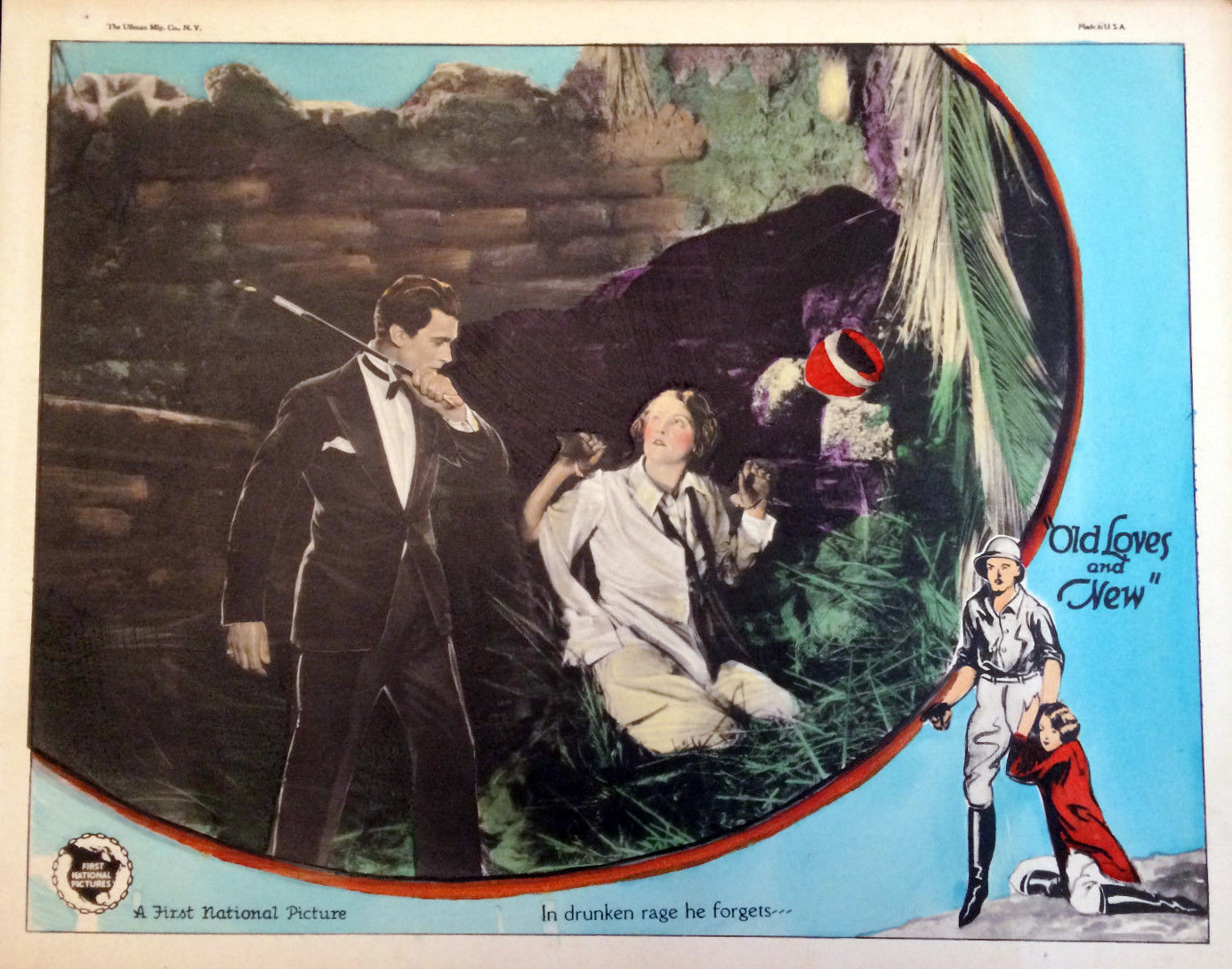
- Lobby card
- Directed by: Maurice Tourneur
- Written by: Marion Fairfax (adaptation)
- Based on: The Desert Healer by Edith Maude Hull
- Produced by: Sam E. Rork
- Cinematography: Henry Cronjager
- Edited by: Patricia Rooney
- Distributed by: First National Pictures
- Release date: April 11, 1926
- Running time: 80 minutes
- Country: United States
- Language: Silent (English intertitles)

Old Loves and New is a 1926 American silent drama film directed by Maurice Tourneur in one of his final American films.

The setting and story are completely typical of the desert-romance genre novelist Edith Maude Hull invented and specialized in. This film is now lost.

== Plot ==
The virtuous Lord Carew and the good-for-nothing Lord Geradine compete for the attentions of the virtuous Marny and the good-for-nothing Lady Carew, all set in the exotic desert sands of Algeria.

== Cast ==
- Lewis Stone as Gervas / Lord Carew
- Barbara Bedford as Marny / Lady Carew
- Walter Pidgeon as Clyde / Lord Geradine
- Katherine MacDonald as Elinor Carew / Lady Geraldine
- Tully Marshall as Hosein
- Ann Rork as Kitty
- Albert Conti as Dr. Chalmers
- Jackie Hoff as Little Boy (uncredited)
