= Brothers (1929 American film) =

- Directed by: Scott Pembroke
- Written by: Arthur Hoerl; Ford Beebe
- Starring: Cornelius Keefe; Barbara Bedford
- Cinematography: Hap Depew
- Distributed by: Rayart Pictures
- Release date: March 23, 1929
- Country: United States
- Languages: Sound (Synchronized) (English Intertitles)

Brothers is a 1929 American sound drama film directed by Scott Pembroke and featuring Cornelius Keefe and Barbara Bedford. The film is one of the last produced in the sound-on-film process known as Phonofilm. While the film has no audible dialog, it was released with a synchronized musical score with sound effects using both the sound-on-disc and sound-on-film process.

== Plot ==
The film

The plot centers around the story of two orphaned brothers, Tom and Bob, who are separated after their parents' death. Bob is sent to an orphanage, while Tom runs away and eventually ends up living a life of crime. However, despite his criminal activities, Tom uses his ill-gotten gains to contribute financially to Bob's education and well-being.

Years later, the brothers meet again completely unaware of their true relationship. Tom, still involved in criminal activities, attempts to recruit Bob for a con game. The situation becomes increasingly complicated as secrets are revealed and the brothers learn the truth about their past and their connection to each other.

The film explores themes of brotherhood, family, and redemption. It also delves into the social issues of the time, such as poverty and the plight of orphans.

== Cast ==
- Cornelius Keefe as Tom Conroy
- Barbara Bedford as Doris LaRue
- Arthur Rankin as Bob Conroy
- Richard Carle as Thomas Blackwood
- George Chesebro as Randy
- Paddy O'Flynn as Norman

== Music ==
A theme song entitled "I'm Dreaming" with words and music by Dan Dougherty was featured on the film soundtrack.

== See also ==
- List of early sound feature films (1926–1929)
