= Gilbert Roland =

American actor (1905–1994)

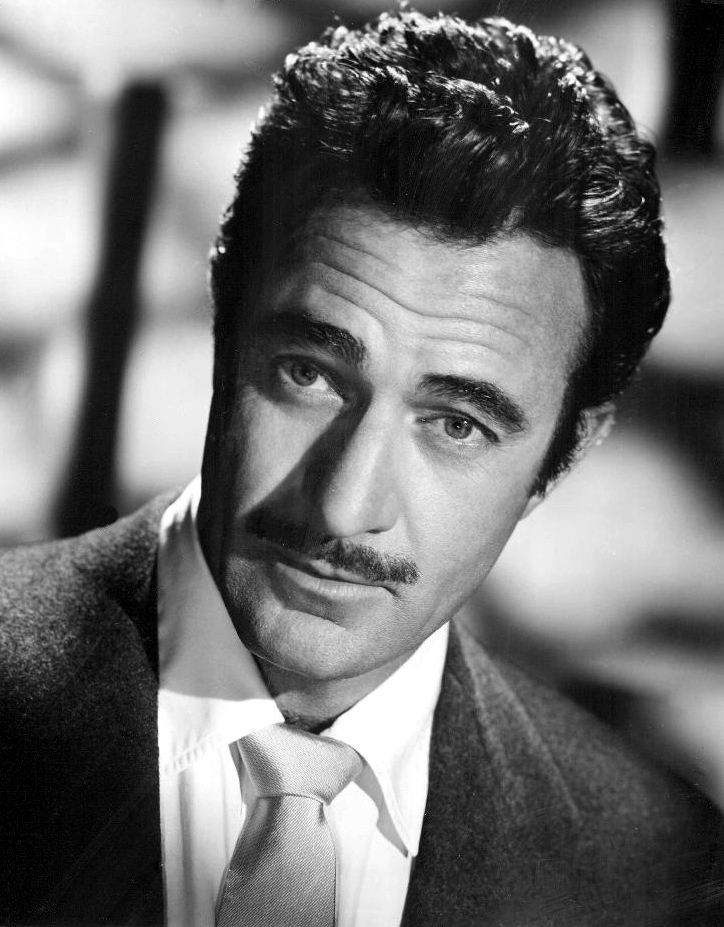
- Roland in 1952
- Born: Luis Antonio Dámaso de Alonso; December 11, 1905; Ciudad Juárez, Chihuahua, Mexico
- Died: May 15, 1994 (aged 88); Beverly Hills, California, U.S.
- Occupation: Actor
- Years active: 1923–1982
- Spouses: Constance Bennett (m. 1941; div. 1945) Guillermina Cantu (m. 1954)
- Children: 2 (including Lorinda)
- Awards: Hollywood Walk of Fame (Motion Picture 6730 Hollywood Boulevard)

Luis Antonio Dámaso de Alonso (December 11, 1905 – May 15, 1994), known professionally as Gilbert Roland, was a Mexican-born American film and television actor whose career spanned seven decades from the 1920s until the 1980s. He was twice nominated for the Golden Globe Award in 1952 and 1964 and inducted into the Hollywood Walk of Fame in 1960.

== Early years ==
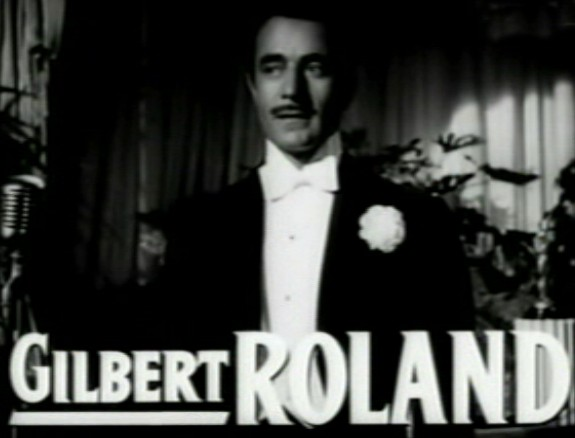
Gilbert Roland from the trailer for The Bad and the Beautiful (1952)

There is some discrepancy about his place of birth, since his father, the Spanish bullfighter Francisco Alonso "Paquiro II", declared to the press that his son was born in Bilbao and that he had Spanish nationality. Other sources say that he was born in Ciudad Juárez, Chihuahua, Mexico. At first he intended to become a bullfighter like his father and his paternal grandfather.

When Pancho Villa took control of their town, Roland and his family fled to the United States. He lived in Texas until at age 14 he hopped on a freight train and went to Hollywood. After arriving there, he found menial jobs and slept in a Catholic church. He often lost those jobs because he spent time working as an extra in films. He chose his screen name by combining the names of his favorite actors, John Gilbert and Ruth Roland. He was often cast in the stereotypical Latin lover role.

== Career ==
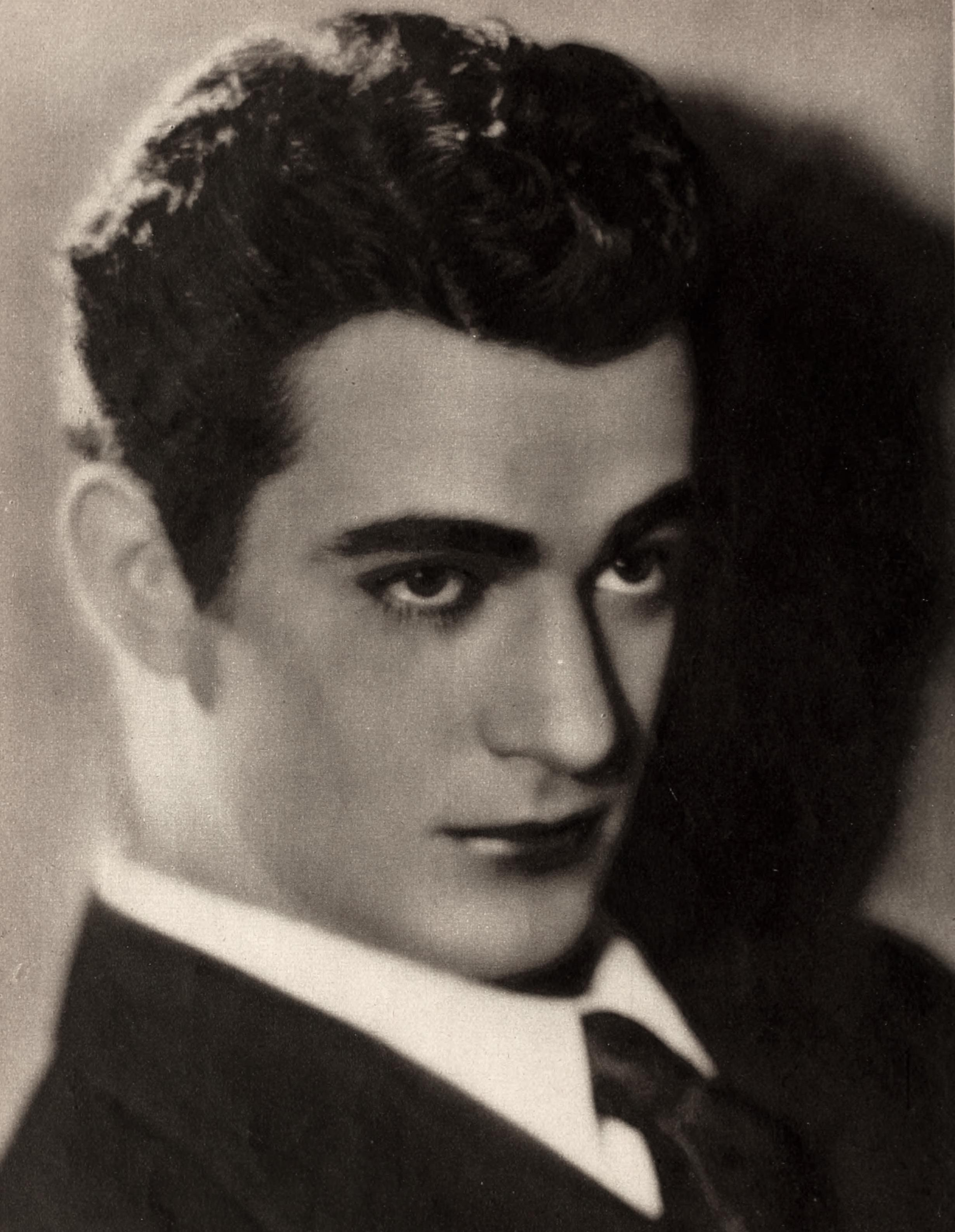
Gilbert Roland (1927)

Roland's first film contract was with Paramount. His first major role was in the collegiate comedy The Plastic Age (1925) together with Clara Bow, to whom he became engaged. In 1927, he played Armand in Camille opposite Norma Talmadge, with whom he was romantically involved, and they starred together in several productions. With the advent of sound films, Roland frequently appeared in Spanish language adaptations of American films in romantic lead roles.

In 1933, Roland played a large supporting role in She Done Him Wrong as one of Mae West's character's lovers, along with rivals Cary Grant, Noah Beery Sr. and Owen Moore.

Roland served in the U.S. Army Air Corps during World War II.

Beginning in the 1940s, critics began to take notice of his acting, and he was praised for his supporting roles in John Huston's We Were Strangers (1949), The Bad and the Beautiful (1952), Thunder Bay (1953), and Cheyenne Autumn (1964). He also appeared in a series of films in the mid-1940s as the popular character "The Cisco Kid". He played Hugo, the agnostic (and fictional) friend of the three shepherd children in The Miracle of Our Lady of Fatima, based on the apparitions of Our Lady of Fatima in 1917. In 1953, Roland played Greek-American sponge diver Mike Petrakis in the epic Beneath the 12-Mile Reef.

He also acted on December Bride and Playhouse 90, and both wrote the script for and acted in an episode of Wagon Train. He played Don Domingo Montoya, who inherits Rancho Montoya near the end of the series The High Chaparral.

His last film appearance was in the 1982 western Barbarosa.

== Personal life ==
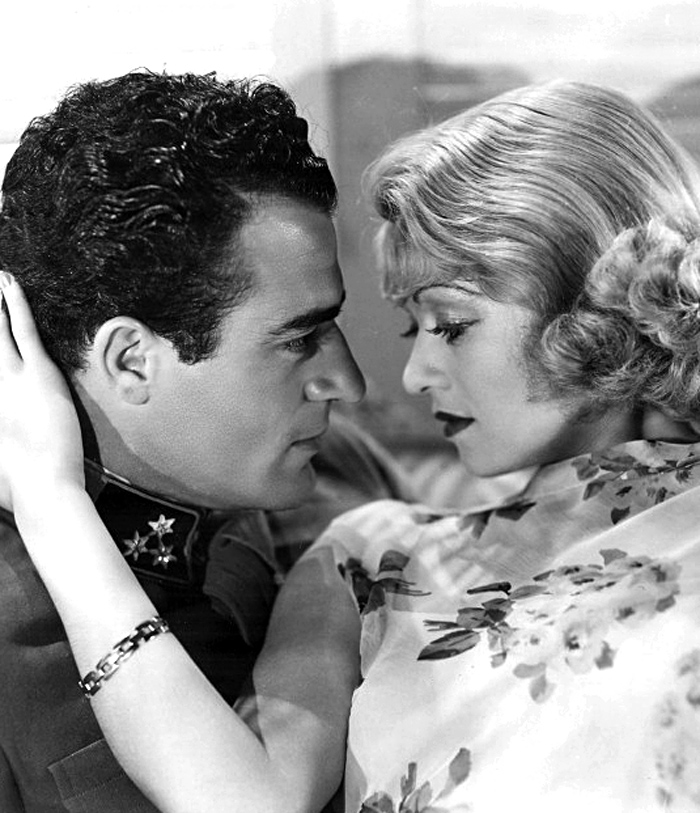
With Constance Bennett in After Tonight (1933)

Roland married actress Constance Bennett on April 20, 1941, in Yuma, Arizona. They were married until 1946 and Bennett adopted his two daughters, sculptor Lorinda "Lynda" (b. 1938) and Christina "Gyl" (b. 1941). Bennett won custody of their daughters. He had appeared with Bennett in 1933 as Pepi D'Costa in George Cukor's Our Betters, and in the same year, as the romantic lead in After Tonight, a World War I drama.

His second marriage to Guillermina Cantú in 1954 lasted until his death 40 years later.

== Death ==
Gilbert Roland died of cancer in Beverly Hills, California, in 1994, aged 88. His body was cremated, and his ashes were scattered at sea.

== Accolades ==
Roland was nominated twice for a Golden Globe Award, for his roles in The Bad and the Beautiful (1952) and Cheyenne Autumn (1964). For his contributions to the motion picture industry, Gilbert Roland has a star on the Hollywood Walk of Fame at 6730 Hollywood Boulevard.

== Archives ==
The moving-image collection of Gilbert Roland is held at the Academy Film Archive. Home movies make up the bulk of the collection. The film material at the Academy Film Archive is complemented by material in the Gilbert Roland papers at the academy's Margaret Herrick Library.

In 1975, El Paso, Texas, held Gilbert Roland Days. Among the recognition given the actor was creation of The Gilbert Roland Newspaper Carrier Scholarships Fund by the Newspaper Printing Corporation.

== Filmography ==
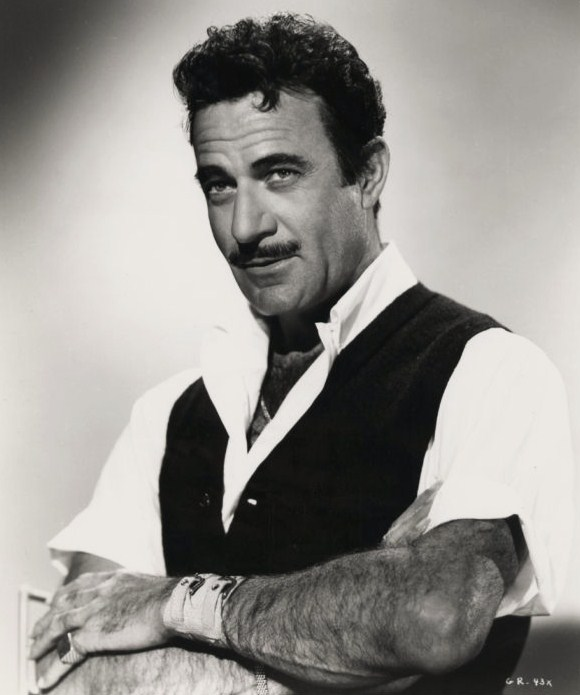
Gilbert Roland in The French Line (1954).

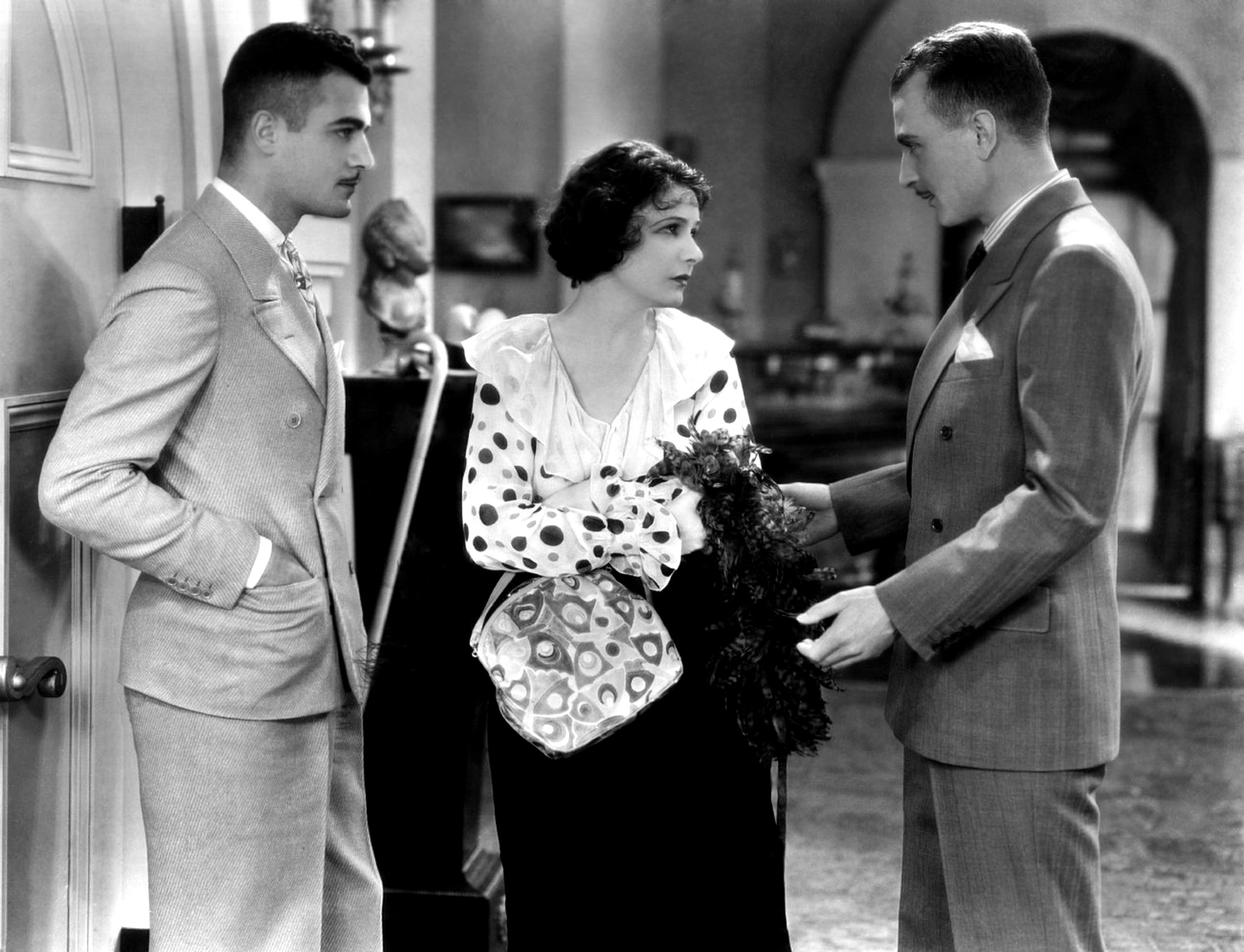
Gilbert Roland in The Woman Disputed (1928), directed by Henry King. Left to right: Gilbert Roland, Norma Talmadge, and Arnold Kent.

=== Cinema ===
- The Hunchback of Notre Dame (1923) as Extra (uncredited)
- The Lost World (1925) as Extra (uncredited)
- The Spaniard (1925) as Matador (uncredited)
- The Lady Who Lied (1925)
- The Lawful Cheater (1925) (uncredited)
- The Midshipman (1925) (uncredited)
- The Plastic Age (1925) as Carl Peters
- The Campus Flirt (1926) as Graham Stearns
- The Blonde Saint (1926) as Annibale
- Camille (1927) as Armand Duval
- Rose of the Golden West (1927) as Juan
- The Love Mart (1927) as Victor Jallot
- The Dove (1927) as Johnny Powell
- The Woman Disputed (1928) as Paul Hartman
- New York Nights (1929) as Fred Deverne
- Men of the North (1930) (Spanish and French version also filmed) as Louis La Bey aka Monsieur Le Fox
- Resurrección (1931) (Spanish version of Resurrection) as Prince Dmitri Nekhludov
- The Passionate Plumber (1932) as Tony Lagorce
- Hombres de mi vida (1932) (Spanish version of Men in Her Life) as Jaime Gilman
- The Woman in Room 13 (1932) as Victor Legrand
- Life Begins (1932) as Tony, Rita's Husband (uncredited)
- No Living Witness (1932) as Jerry Bennett
- A Parisian Romance (1932) as Victor
- Call Her Savage (1932) as Moonglow
- She Done Him Wrong (1933) as Serge Stanieff
- Our Betters (1933) as Pepi D'Costa
- The Romantic Widow (1933) as Luis Felipe de Córdoba aka Prudencio González
- Tarnished Youth (1933) (UK version of Gigolettes of Paris) as Antoine 'Tony' Ferrand
- After Tonight (1933) as Captain Rudolph "Rudy" Ritter
- Yo, tú y ella (1933) as Gabriel Villalba
- Elinor Norton (1934) as Rene Alba
- Mystery Woman (1935) as Juan Santanda
- Juliet Buys a Baby (1935) as Jack Aranda
- Ladies Love Danger (1935) as Ricardo Souchet aka Alonzo
- Midnight Taxi (1937) as Flash Dillon
- The Last Train from Madrid (1937) as Eduardo de Soto
- Thunder Trail (1937) as Dick Ames aka Arizona Lopez
- La vida bohemia (1938) as Rodolfo
- Gateway (1938) as Tony Cadona
- Juarez (1939) as Colonel Miguel Lopez
- Isle of Destiny (1940) as Oliver Barton
- Gambling on the High Seas (1940) as Greg Morella
- The Sea Hawk (1940) as Captain Lopez
- Rangers of Fortune (1940) as Antonio Hernandez Sierra
- Angels with Broken Wings (1941) as Don Pablo Vincente
- My Life with Caroline (1941) as Paco Del Valle
- Enemy Agents Meet Ellery Queen (1942) as Paul Gillette
- Isle of Missing Men (1942) as Thomas 'Dan' Bentley aka Curtis
- The Desert Hawk (1944) as Kasim, The Desert Hawk / Hassan, The Evil Twin Brother
- Captain Kidd (1945) as Jose Lorenzo
- The Gay Cavalier (1946) as The Cisco Kid
- South of Monterey (1946) as The Cisco Kid
- Beauty and the Bandit (1946) as The Cisco Kid
- Riding the California Trail (1947) as The Cisco Kid posing as Don Luis Salazar
- The Other Love (1947) as Croupier
- High Conquest (1947) as Hugo Lanier
- Robin Hood of Monterey (1947) as The Cisco Kid
- Pirates of Monterey (1947) as Major de Rojas
- King of the Bandits (1947) as the Cisco Kid aka Ramon Mojica
- The Dude Goes West (1948) as Pecos Kid
- The Rebellion of the Ghosts (1949) as Arturo del Rosal
- We Were Strangers (1949) as Guillermo Montilla
- Malaya (1949) as Romano
- The Torch (1950) as Father Sierra
- Crisis (1950) as Roland Gonzales
- The Furies (1950) as Juan Herrera
- Bullfighter and the Lady (1951) as Manolo Estrada
- The Mark of the Renegade (1951) as Don Pedro Garcia
- Ten Tall Men (1951) as Corporal Luis Delgado
- My Six Convicts (1952) as Punch Pinero
- Glory Alley (1952) as Peppi Donnato
- The Miracle of Our Lady of Fatima (1952) as Hugo da Silva
- Apache War Smoke (1952) as Peso Herrera
- The Bad and the Beautiful (1952) as Victor 'Gaucho' Ribero
- Thunder Bay (1953) as Teche Bossier
- The Diamond Queen (1953) as Baron Paul de Cabannes
- Beneath the 12-Mile Reef (1953) as Mike Petrakis
- The French Line (1953) as Pierre DuQuesne
- The Racers (1955) as Dell'Oro
- Underwater! (1955) as Dominic Quesada
- That Lady (1955) as Antonio Perez
- The Treasure of Pancho Villa (1955) as Colonel Juan Castro
- Bandido (1956) as Colonel José Escobar
- Around the World in 80 Days (1956) as Achmed Abdullah
- Three Violent People (1956) as Innocencio Ortega
- The Midnight Story (1957) as Sylvio Malatesta
- The Last of the Fast Guns (1958) as Miles Lang
- The Wild and the Innocent (1959) as Paul
- The Big Circus (1959) as Zach Colino
- Catch Me If You Can (1959) as Gilberto Ramnes
- Guns of the Timberland (1960) as Monty Walker
- Samar (1962) as Colonel Juan Sebastian Salazar
- Cheyenne Autumn (1964) as Dull Knife
- The Reward (1965) as Captain Carbajal
- The Poppy Is Also a Flower (1966) as Serge Marko
- Any Gun Can Play (1967) as Monetero
- The Ruthless Four (1968) as Mason
- Between God, the Devil and a Winchester (1968) as Horace
- Johnny Hamlet (1968) as Juan Chasquisdo
- Sartana Does Not Forgive (1968) as Kirchner
- The Christian Licorice Store (1971) as Jonathan 'JC' Carruthers
- Running Wild (1973) as Chief Tomacito
- Treasure of Tayopa (1974) as Himself - Host
- The Pacific Connection (1974) as Alan
- Islands in the Stream (1977) as Captain Ralph
- The Black Pearl (1977)
- Caboblanco (1980) as Dr. Rudolfo Ramirez
- Barbarosa (1982) as Don Braulio (final film role)

=== Television ===
- Wagon Train, Season 1 Episode 24 “The Bernal Sierra Story” (1958) Co-wrote the episode and guest starred as Don Bernal
- Zorro, episodes "El Bandido" and "Adios El Cuchillo" (1960) as El Cuchillo / The Knife
- Gunsmoke, episodes "Extradition"/"Extradition: Part 2" (1963) as Lieutenant Julio Chavez
- Death Valley Days, episode "A Kingdom for a Horse" (1963) as Emperor Dom Pedro
- The Alfred Hitchcock Hour (1963) (Season 1 Episode 27: "Death and the Joyful Woman") as Luis Aguilar
- The Fugitive, episode "Somebody to Remember" (1964) as Gus Priamos;
- Combat!, episode "The Convict" (1965) as Boulanger
- Bonanza, episode "The Lonely Runner" (1965) as Jim Acton
- The Fugitive, episode "The Savage Street" (1967) as Jose Anza
- The High Chaparral, episode "The New Lion of Sonora" (1971) as Don Domingo Montoya
- Night Gallery, segment "The Waiting Room" (1972) as The Bartender
- Incident on a Dark Street (1973, TV Movie) as Dominic Leopold
- Kung Fu (1972 TV series), episode "The Chalice" (1973)
- Barnaby Jones, episode "Rendezvous with Terror" (1974)
- The Mark of Zorro (1974, TV Movie) as Don Alejandro Vega
- The Sacketts (1979, TV Movie) as Don Luis
- Hart to Hart, episode "The Raid" (1980) as Jorge

=== Short subjects ===
- La Fiesta de Santa Barbara (1935)
- Screen Snapshots Series 15, No. 8 (1936)
- Picture People No. 2: Hollywood Sports (1941)
- Wings Up (1943)
