= The Fighting Roosevelts =

1919 film by William Nigh

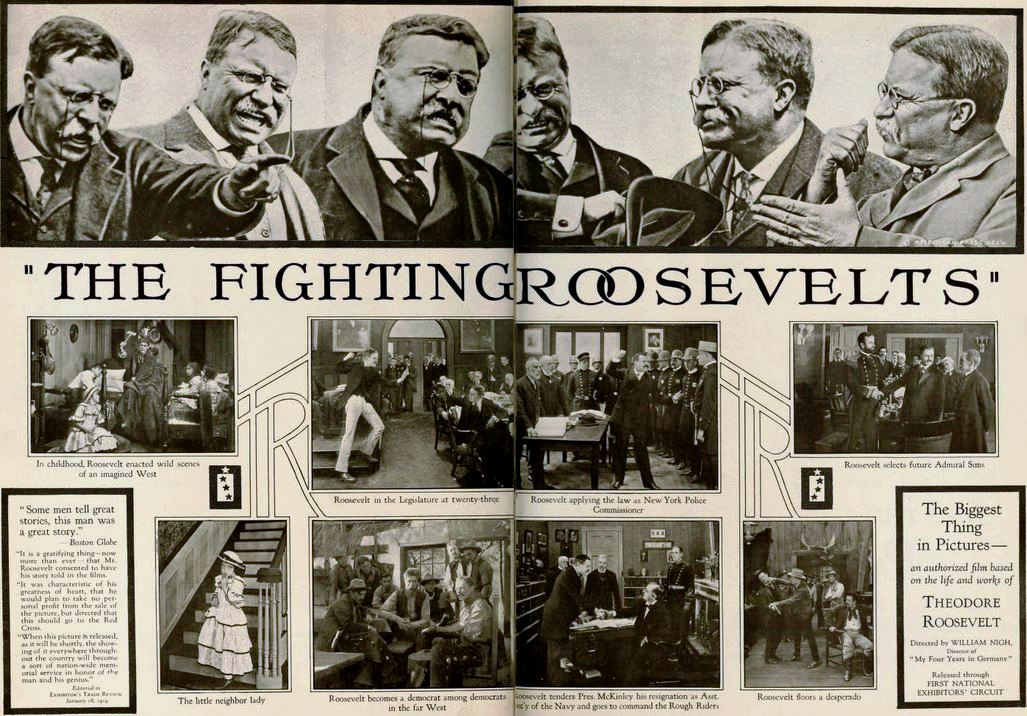
- An advertisement for the film.
- Directed by: William Nigh
- Story by: Charles Hanson Towne; Porter Emerson Browne
- Produced by: Frederick L. Collins
- Starring: Francis J. Noonan; Herbert Bradshaw; E. J. Ratcliffe
- Cinematography: Charles J. Davis; R. Schellinger
- Production company: McClure Productions
- Distributed by: First National Exhibitors' Circuit
- Release date: January 19, 1919
- Running time: 6 reels
- Country: United States
- Language: Silent (English intertitles)

The Fighting Roosevelts is a 1919 biographical film about Theodore Roosevelt. It is not known whether the film currently survives.

== Cast ==
- Francis J. Noonan as Theodore Roosevelt (child)
- Herbert Bradshaw as Theodore Roosevelt (young adult)
- E. J. Ratcliffe as Theodore Roosevelt (president)

== Production ==
During production, William Nigh received permission to access much of Theodore Roosevelt's personal possessions. This allowed the film to reveal new information about the former president. Roosevelt himself authorized the film with the hope that the film's earnings would go to "patriotic organizations", such as the Red Cross. He died one week later.
