= Out of the Silent North =

1922 film by William Worthington

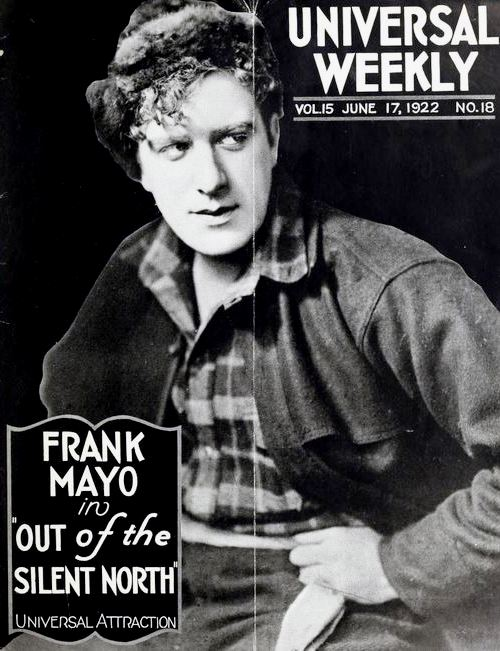
- Advertisement
- Directed by: William Worthington
- Screenplay by: Wallace C. Clifton; George C. Hull
- Story by: Harry Sinclair Drago; Joseph Noël
- Starring: Frank Mayo; Barbara Bedford; Frank Leigh; Harris Gordon; Christian J. Frank; Frank Lanning
- Cinematography: Arthur Reeves
- Production company: Universal Film Manufacturing Company
- Distributed by: Universal Film Manufacturing Company
- Release date: June 19, 1922
- Running time: 50 minutes
- Country: United States
- Language: Silent (English intertitles)

Out of the Silent North is a 1922 American silent drama film directed by William Worthington and written by Wallace C. Clifton and George C. Hull. The film stars Frank Mayo, Barbara Bedford, Frank Leigh, Harris Gordon, Christian J. Frank, and Frank Lanning. The film was released on June 19, 1922, by Universal Film Manufacturing Company.

== Plot ==
As described in a film magazine, French Canadian trapper Pierre Baptiste is in love with Marcette Vallois, daughter of the post storekeeper, but he does not declare his love until he sets out with Englishman Reginald Stannard to locate a mine. A map giving the location of the mine falls into the hands of a loafer at the post, and unscrupulous schemers who have recently arrived at the post take advantage of the absence of Reginald to arrest Pierre to get possession of the mine. Pierre discovers that he and Stafford have located the mine on the wrong creek, so he rushes to town to relocate the claim and wins in a hard race with the schemers. In the end, Marcette declares her love for him.

== Cast ==
- Frank Mayo as Pierre Baptiste
- Barbara Bedford as Marcette Vallois
- Frank Leigh as Ashleigh Nefferton
- Harris Gordon as Reginald Stannard
- Christian J. Frank as Pete Bellew
- Frank Lanning as Jean Cour
- Louis Rivera as Mattigami
- Dick La Reno as 'Lazy' Lester

== Preservation ==
Out of the Silent North is currently presumed lost. In February of 2021, the film was cited by the National Film Preservation Board on their Lost U.S. Silent Feature Films list.
