= The Prince of Headwaiters =

1927 film

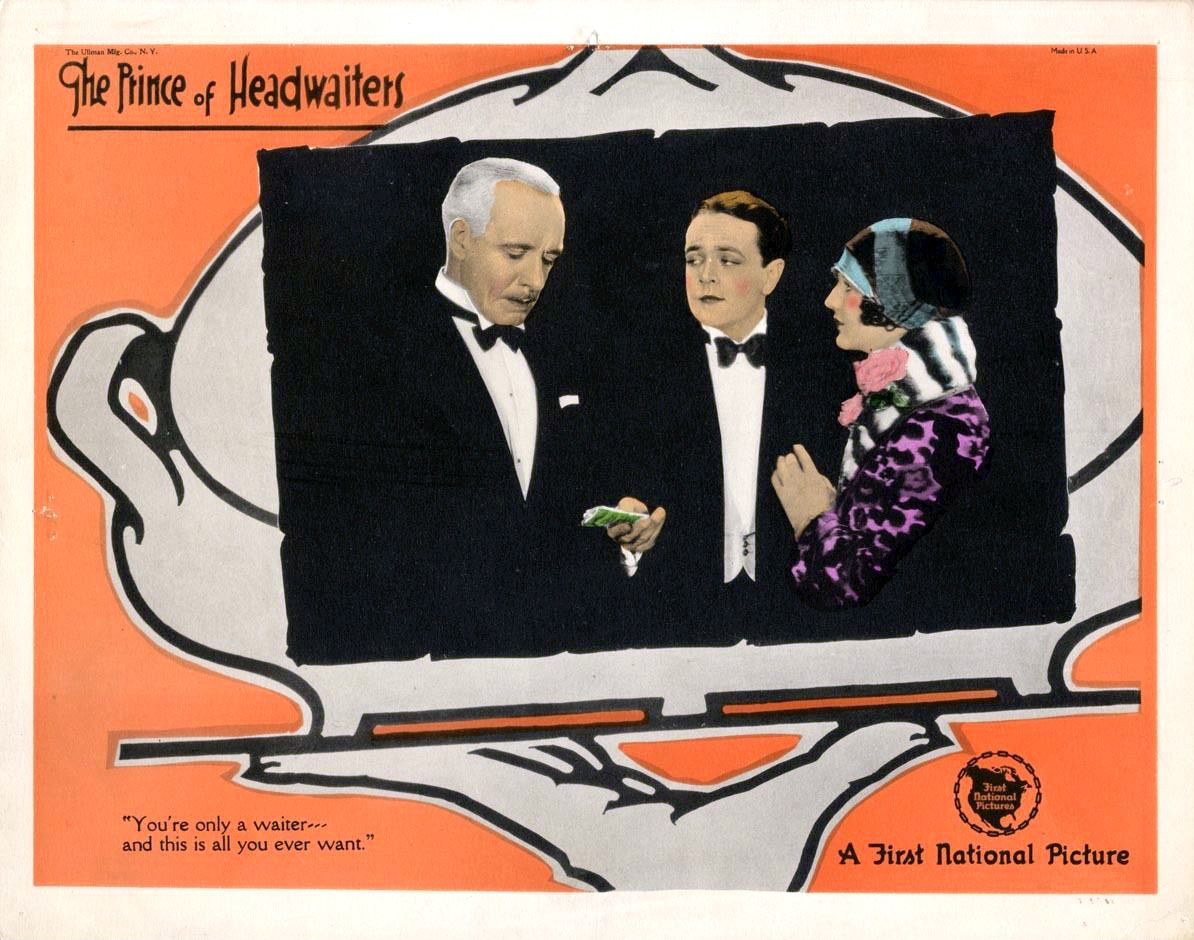
- Lobby card
- Directed by: John Francis Dillon
- Written by: Jane Murfin
- Based on: "The Prince of Headwaiters" by Viola Brothers Shore and Garrett Fort
- Produced by: Sam E. Rork
- Starring: Lewis Stone
- Cinematography: James Van Trees
- Distributed by: First National Pictures
- Release date: 9 July 1927
- Running time: 70 minutes
- Country: United States
- Language: Silent (English intertitles)

The Prince of Headwaiters is a 1927 American silent drama film directed by John Francis Dillon.

== Premise ==
A maitre d' at the Hôtel Ritz Paris finds out his son, wealthy thanks to his mother, might be blackmailed by Mae Morin.

== Cast ==
- Lewis Stone as Pierre
- Priscilla Bonner as Faith Cable
- E. J. Ratcliffe as John Cable
- Lilyan Tashman as Mae Morin
- John Patrick as Barry Frost
- Robert Agnew as Elliott Cable
- Ann Rork as Beth
- Cleve Moore as College Boy
- Dick Folkens as College Boy
- Lincoln Stedman as College Boy
- Cecille Evans as Susanne
- Marion McDonald as Judy
- Nita Cavalier as Elsie

== Preservation ==
This film is now lost.
