= E. J. Ratcliffe =

British actor

Edward J. Ratcliffe
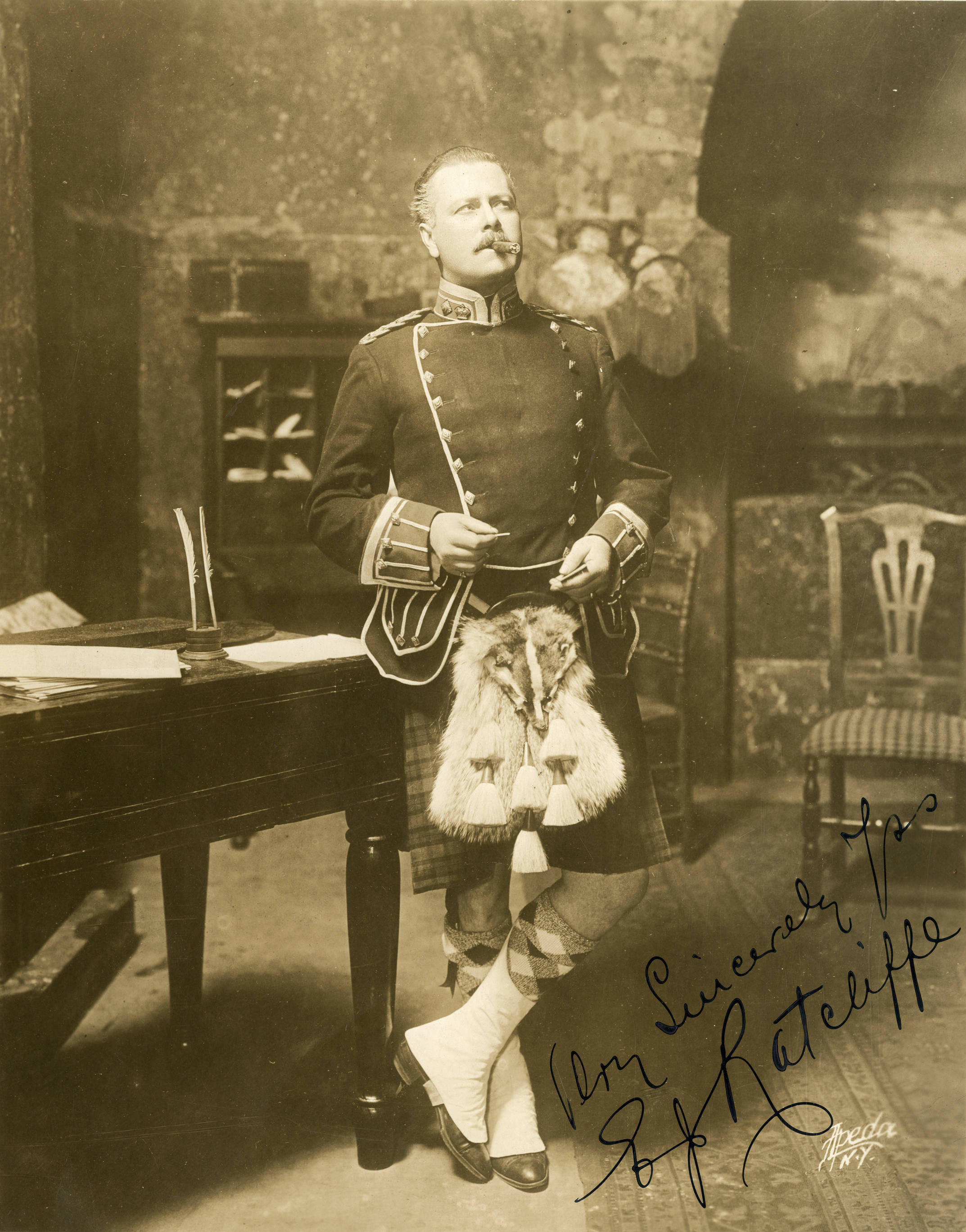
- Ratcliffe in a 1912 play
- Born: 10 March 1863; London, England
- Died: 28 September 1948 (aged 85); Los Angeles, California, US
- Occupation: Actor
- Years active: 1880s-1933
- Spouse(s): Caroline Ravenhill (m. 1883–98; divorced) Alice De Lacy (m. 1894–98; divorced) Blanche Stoddard
- Children: Virginia Ratcliffe McAleenan Dorothy Ratcliffe Taylor

Edward J. Ratcliffe (10 March 1863 – 28 September 1948) was an English actor of stage and screen. He had an established stage career behind him when he came to films in 1915. He then spent nearly twenty years before the cameras before making his last film in 1933. He can be seen in many surviving silent and sound films. In the early Warner Brothers sound extravaganza The Show of Shows he plays Henry VI in the excerpted vignette from that play opposite John Barrymore's Richard III.

Ratcliffe played Theodore Roosevelt in three films: The Fighting Roosevelts (1919), Sundown (1924), and I Loved a Woman (1933).

New York barman Patrick Duffy claimed Ratcliffe brought the highball from England to the U.S. in 1894.

== Selected filmography ==
- The Struggle Everlasting (1918)
- Out of a Clear Sky (1918)
- The Divorcee (1919)
- The Fighting Roosevelts (1919)
- A Daughter of Two Worlds (1920)
- Even as Eve (1920)
- Love, Honor and Obey (1920)
- The Great Adventure (1921)
- The Idol of the North (1921)
- Experience (1921)
- Disraeli (1921)
- Miss 139 (1921)
- Wine of Youth (1924)
- Sundown (1924) (as Teddy Roosevelt)
- Introduce Me (1925)
- The Marriage Whirl (1925)
- The Thrill Hunter (1926)
- The Black Pirate (1926)
- Skinner's Dress Suit (1926)
- Rolling Home (1926)
- The Winning of Barbara Worth (1926)
- The Notorious Lady (1927)
- Smile, Brother, Smile (1927)
- Framed (1927)
- Cheating Cheaters (1927)
- The Prince of Headwaiters (1927)
- The Four Feathers (1929)
- The Jazz Age (1929)
- The Show of Shows (1929)
- Sally (1929)
- The Cohens and the Kellys in Scotland (1930)
- I Loved a Woman (1933) (as Teddy Roosevelt)

== See also ==
- List of actors who played President of the United States
