= Albert Conti =

Austrian-American actor (1887–1967)

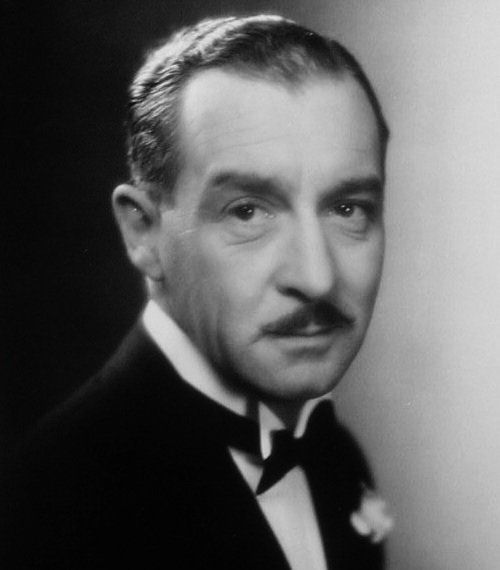
- Conti in 1929
- Born: Albert Maroica Blasius Franz Maria, Ritter Conti von Cedassamare; January 29, 1887; Gorizia, Austria-Hungary (now Gorizia, Friuli-Venezia Giulia, Italy)
- Died: January 18, 1967 (aged 79); Hollywood, California, U.S.
- Years active: 1923–1952
- Spouse: Miriam Wherry (née Patricia Cross) (1927–?)
- Family: Kaboga

Albert Maroica Blasius Franz Maria, Ritter Conti von Cedassamare (29 January 1887 – 18 January 1967), commonly known as Albert Conti, was an Austrian-American actor. He was a member of the noble Kaboga family.

== Biography ==
Conti was born in the village of Gorizia (now, part of Italy), an achieved moderate fame as an actor in American films, but first he specialized in law (high school and law college in Graz) and natural science, and married Patricia Cross. When World War I began, he became an officer. He was the son of Albert, Ritter Conti von Cedassamare and his wife, Countess Marie Bernhardine Anna Kaboga, a member of an old Ragusan/Dubrovnik noble family (see: House of Caboga). After his discharge from the Austrian army at the close of World War I, he came to America like many other now-impoverished postwar Europeans from both sides of the conflict.

== Emigration to U.S.A. ==
Conti emigrated to the United States via the Port of Philadelphia in 1919. After settling in the new country, Conti was obliged to take a series of manual labor jobs, his patrician background notwithstanding. While working in the California oil fields, he answered an open call placed by director Erich von Stroheim, who was in search of an Austrian military officer to act as technical advisor for his upcoming film Merry-Go-Round (1923).

A better actor than most of his fellow Habsburg Empire expatriates, Conti was able to secure dignified character roles in several silent and sound films; his credits ranged from Josef von Sternberg's Morocco (1930) to the early Laurel and Hardy knockabout Slipping Wives (1927). He appeared in the 1928 silent film Dry Martini as a roué artist. Though he made his last film in 1942, Albert Conti remained in the industry as an employee of the MGM wardrobe department, where he worked until his retirement in 1962.

== Selected filmography ==
- Merry-Go-Round (1923) – Rudi / Baron von Leightsinn
- The Merry Widow (1925) – Danilo's Adjutant (uncredited)
- The Eagle (1925) – Kuschka
- Watch Your Wife (1926) – Alphonse Marsac
- Old Loves and New (1926) – Dr. Chalmers
- The Blonde Saint (1926) – Andreas
- Camille (1927) – Henri
- Slipping Wives (1927, Short) – Hon. Winchester Squirtz
- Mockery (1927) – Military Commandant at Novokursk (uncredited)
- Love Me and the World Is Mine (1927) – Billie
- The Chinese Parrot (1927) – Martin Thorne
- The Devil Dancer (1927) – Arnold Guthrie
- Honeymoon Hate (1927) – (uncredited)
- South Sea Love (1927) – Max Weber
- The Legion of the Condemned (1928) – Von Hohendorff
- Alex the Great (1928) – Ed
- Tempest (1928) – Minor Role (uncredited)
- The Magnificent Flirt (1928) – Count D'Estrange
- Stocks and Blondes (1928) – Powers
- Plastered in Paris (1928) – Abou Ben Abed
- The Wedding March (1928) – Imperial Guard (uncredited)
- Dry Martini (1928) – Conway Cross
- Show People (1928) – Producer
- Captain Lash (1929) – Alex Condax
- Lady of the Pavements (1929) – Baron Finot
- Making the Grade (1929) – Minor Role (uncredited)
- Saturday's Children (1929) – Mengle
- The Exalted Flapper (1929) – King Alexander of Capra
- Jazz Heaven (1929) – Walter Klucke
- The Melody Man (1930) – Prince Friedrich
- Such Men Are Dangerous (1930) – Paul Strohm
- One Romantic Night (1930) – Count Lutzen
- Our Blushing Brides (1930) – Monsieur Pantoise
- Monte Carlo (1930) – Master of Ceremonies
- Madam Satan (1930) – Empire Officer
- Morocco (1930) – Col. Quinnovieres (uncredited)
- Oh, for a Man! (1930) – Peck
- Sea Legs (1930) – Captain
- The Gang Buster (1931) – Carlo (uncredited)
- Liebe auf Befehl (1931) – Der Gesandtschaftssekretär
- Strangers May Kiss (1931) – De Bazan
- Always Goodbye (1931) – Party Gossip (uncredited)
- Just a Gigolo (1931) – A French Husband
- The Common Law (1931) – Strangeways Party Guest (uncredited)
- This Modern Age (1931) – André de Graignon
- Heartbreak (1931) – Liaison Officer
- The Woman from Monte Carlo (1932) – A Man of the World (uncredited)
- The Greeks Had a Word for Them (1932) – Frenchman on Liner (uncredited)
- Freaks (1932) – Landowner (uncredited)
- Lady with a Past (1932) – Rene
- Shopworn (1932) – Andre
- Careless Lady (1932) – French Hotel Desk Clerk (uncredited)
- Doomed Battalion (1932) – Captain Kessler
- State's Attorney (1932) – Mario
- As You Desire Me (1932) – Captain
- Red-Headed Woman (1932) – Frenchman in Paris (uncredited)
- The Night Club Lady (1932) – Vincent Rowland
- Men Are Such Fools (1932) – Spinelli
- Second Fiddle (1932)
- The Secret of Madame Blanche (1933) – French Hotel Desk Clerk (uncredited)
- Topaze (1933) – Henri de Fairville
- Love Is Dangerous (1933) – R.J. Ormsby
- The Barbarian (1933) – Restaurant Manager (uncredited)
- Adorable (1933) – The Captain (uncredited)
- I Love That Man (1933) – Pietro – Headwaiter (uncredited)
- Shanghai Madness (1933) – Rigaud
- Torch Singer (1933) – Carlotti
- My Lips Betray (1933) – Auto Salesman (uncredited)
- Gigolettes of Paris (1933)
- Beloved (1934) – Baron Franz von Hausmann
- Nana (1934) – Hugo – Grand Duke's Aide (uncredited)
- Fashions of 1934 (1934) – Savarin (uncredited)
- Gambling Lady (1934) – French Roulette Onlooker (uncredited)
- Riptide (1934) – Man Helping the Fallen Tommie (uncredited)
- The Black Cat (1934) – The Lieutenant
- Elmer and Elsie (1934) – Barlotti
- Love Time (1934) – Nicholas
- Mills of the Gods (1934) – Count Filippo Di Fraschiani
- The Night Is Young (1935) – Mueller (uncredited)
- Symphony of Living (1935) – Mancini
- Shadow of Doubt (1935) – Louie – Head Waiter (uncredited)
- Goin' to Town (1935) – Head Steward (uncredited)
- The Crusades (1935) – Leopold – Duke of Austria
- Here's to Romance (1935) – LeFevre
- Page Miss Glory (1935) – Riding Habit Tailor (uncredited)
- Diamond Jim (1935) – Jeweler
- Hands Across the Table (1935) – Maitre d' in Speakeasy (uncredited)
- Collegiate (1936) – Headwaiter
- The Case Against Mrs. Ames (1936) – Armand – Headwaiter (uncredited)
- Fatal Lady (1936) – Headwaiter (uncredited)
- Hollywood Boulevard (1936) – Bill Sanford – Trocadero Manager
- Three Smart Girls (1936) – Count's Friend (uncredited)
- One in a Million (1936) – Hotel Manager
- Stolen Holiday (1937) – Photographer (uncredited)
- Her Husband Lies (1937) – Antoine (uncredited)
- Cafe Metropole (1937) – Gendarme at Jail (uncredited)
- Dangerously Yours (1937) – Monet
- Conquest (1937) – Count Wallenstein (uncredited)
- I'll Take Romance (1937) – Lepino (uncredited)
- Always Goodbye (1938) – Modiste Benoit
- Gateway (1938) – Count
- Suez (1938) – M. Fevrier
- Charlie Chan in City in Darkness (1939) – Travel Agency Manager (uncredited)
- Everything Happens at Night (1939) – Maitre d'Hotel (uncredited)
- The Cowboy and the Blonde (1941) – Executive (uncredited)
- My Gal Sal (1942) – Henri
- The Human Comedy (1943) – Customer (uncredited)
- The Pride of St. Louis (1952) – Frank Crosetti (uncredited) (final film role)
