= Dry Martini (film) =

1928 film

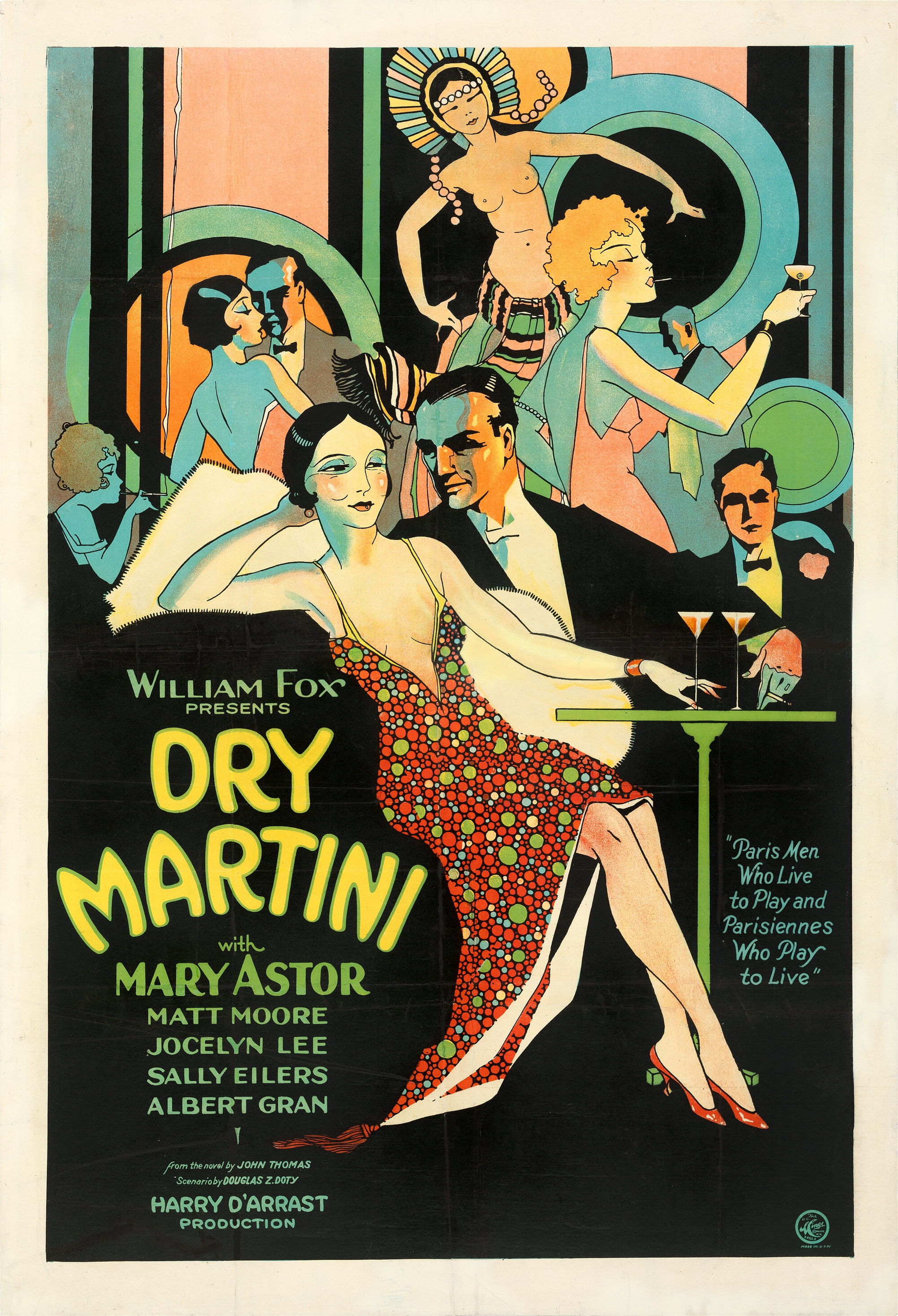
- Directed by: Harry d'Abbadie d'Arrast
- Written by: Douglas Z. Doty
- Produced by: William Fox
- Starring: Mary Astor
- Cinematography: Conrad Wells
- Edited by: Frank E. Hull
- Music by: Erno Rapee
- Distributed by: Fox Film Corporation
- Release date: October 7, 1928
- Running time: 80 minutes
- Country: United States
- Languages: Sound (Synchronized) (English intertitles)

Dry Martini is a 1928 American synchronized sound comedy film produced and distributed by Fox Film Corporation starring Mary Astor and Matt Moore. While the film has no audible dialog, it was released with a synchronized musical score with sound effects using the sound-on-film movietone process. Samuel L. Rothafel also contributed music for the film. It was adapted from the 1926 novel Dry Martini: a Gentleman Turns to Love by John Thomas. Ray Flynn was an assistant director.

== Plot ==
Willoughby Quimby (Albert Gran), a middle-aged American millionaire, has been living a carefree, hedonistic life in Paris for the past decade. He originally came over at the start of Prohibition, leaving behind his wife and young daughter, Elisabeth. Since then, he’s immersed himself in the city’s pleasures — cocktails at Harry’s American Bar, a string of Parisian girlfriends, and an easy camaraderie with his drinking companion Freddie Fletcher (Matt Moore), a perpetually cheerful fellow who is always missing boats and ordering dry martinis.

Quimby’s comfortable routine is shaken when he receives word from his ex-wife that Elisabeth (Mary Astor) will soon arrive for a visit. Expecting the prim little girl he left behind, Quimby hurriedly tries to “reform” — giving up his mistress Lucille Grosvenor (Sally Eilers) and his constant martinis, and attempting to sweep away the traces of his Parisian escapades.

When Elisabeth arrives, Quimby is surprised to find not a shy, sheltered young lady but a modern, independent-minded woman eager to enjoy life in Paris. She quickly attracts the attention of Paul de Launay (Albert Conti), a suave and sophisticated French artist. Fascinated by the city’s freer morals, Elisabeth even toys with the idea of entering into a “companionate marriage” with Paul — a union based on companionship rather than convention.

Freddie Fletcher, who quietly falls for Elisabeth, teams up with Quimby to keep her away from the charming but suspect Frenchman. Their attempts are both comedic and often unsuccessful. Eventually, word reaches Freddie that Elisabeth is visiting Paul at his apartment. Fearing the worst, he rushes over and confronts Paul in an off-screen scuffle. In a twist, the hero doesn’t triumph — Freddie is soundly beaten.

Nevertheless, the confrontation shakes Elisabeth’s romantic illusions. She begins to see Freddie’s genuine concern and decency beneath his carefree exterior. Realizing that he is the man she truly cares for, Elisabeth decides to return to America with him.

As father and daughter prepare to part ways, Quimby cheerfully reverts to his old Parisian habits, settling back into his familiar haunts, cocktails, and female companionship — content to let the younger generation seek love and adventure elsewhere.

== Cast ==
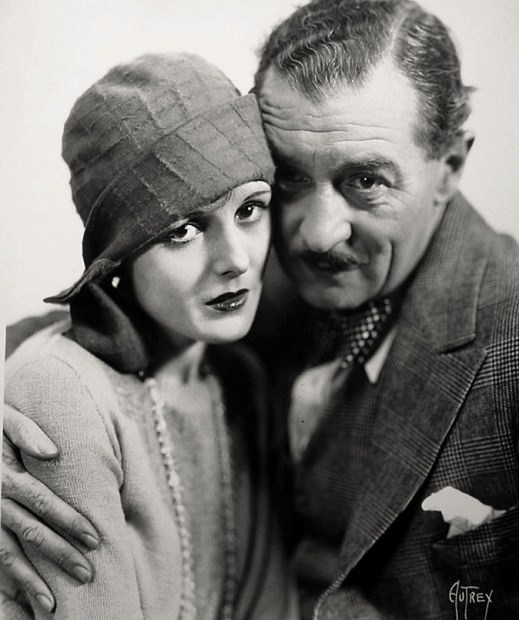
Mary Astor and Albert Conti in the film

- Mary Astor as Elizabeth Quimby
- Matt Moore as Freddie Fletcher
- Sally Eilers as Lucille Grosvenor
- Albert Gran as Willoughby Quimby
- Albert Conti as Paul De Launay
- Tom Ricketts as Joseph
- Hugh Trevor as Bobbie Duncan
- John Webb Dillon as Frank
- Marcelle Corday as Mrs. Koenig

== Censorship ==
When Dry Martini was released, many states and cities in the United States had censor boards that could require cuts or other eliminations before the film could be shown. The Kansas censor board ordered a cut of an intertitle with the caption, "You can count on her discretion."

== Preservation ==
Dry Martini is a lost film.

== See also ==
- List of early sound feature films (1926–1929)
