= Slipping Wives =

1927 film

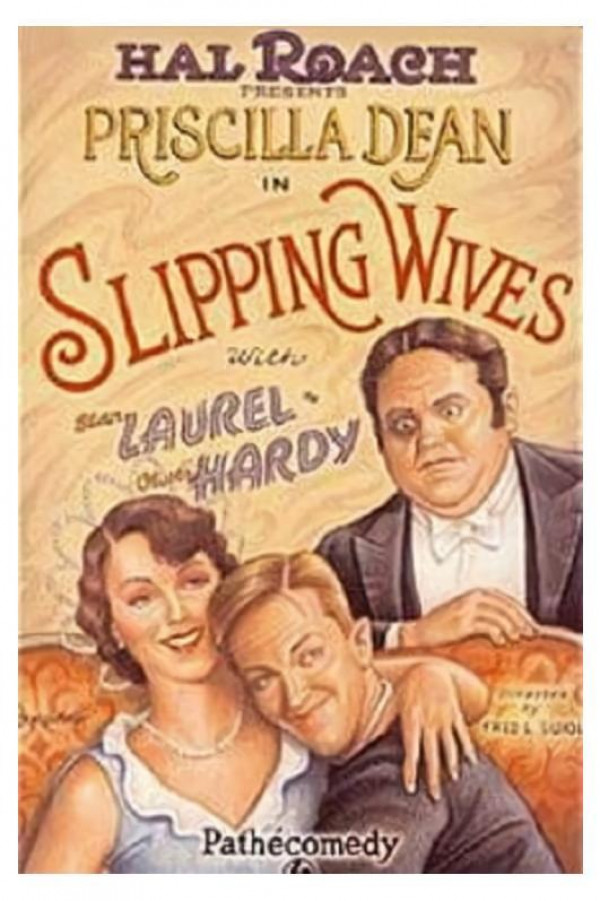
- Theatrical poster
- Directed by: Fred Guiol
- Written by: Hal Roach (story); H.M. Walker (titles)
- Produced by: Hal Roach
- Starring: Priscilla Dean; Oliver Hardy; Stan Laurel; Herbert Rawlinson; Albert Conti
- Cinematography: George Stevens
- Edited by: Richard C. Currier
- Distributed by: Pathé Exchange
- Release date: April 3, 1927
- Running time: 21:40
- Country: United States
- Language: Silent (English intertitles)

Full film

Slipping Wives is a 1927 American silent short comedy film starring Priscilla Dean with Stan Laurel, and Oliver Hardy prior to their official billing as the duo Laurel and Hardy.

== Plot ==
Priscilla is married to an artist named Leon. However Leon has not been showing much interest in his wife, so she hatches a plot to win back his affections. Ollie plays the butler. Stan arrives at the door to sell paint and has a fight with Ollie. Priscilla employs Stan to "make love to her" and ensure Leon becomes jealous. Ollie has to wash and dress Stan and make him look presentable enough to fool Leon at a dinner party that night. Priscilla admits to Leon what she has done and he pulls a gun to teach the 'home-wrecker' a lesson. Leon corners Stan and admits he is just acting to make Priscilla think he's really jealous. Ollie does not realise this and he chases Stan out of the house with a rifle. Ollie returns looking shaken. A police officer follows him and says "You nearly blew my brains out". Leon and Priscilla hug.

Stan had been enthralling the party guests with a pantomime version of Samson and Delilah, ending with Samson pulling down the temple "and killing three thousand Philadelphians".

== Cast ==
- Priscilla Dean as Wife
- Oliver Hardy as Butler
- Stan Laurel as Ferdinand Flamingo
- Herbert Rawlinson as Husband
- Albert Conti as Hon. Winchester Squirtz

== Partial remake ==
Slipping Wives was later reworked into the team's penultimate short film The Fixer Uppers, made in 1935.
