= Señor Jim =

1936 western film

- Directed by: Jacques Jaccard
- Written by: Celia Jaccard
- Produced by: Sam Efrus; Mitchell Leichter
- Starring: Conway Tearle; Barbara Bedford; Alberta Dugan
- Cinematography: Ted D. McCord
- Edited by: Fred Bain
- Music by: Hugh Tulane
- Production company: Black King Productions
- Distributed by: William Steiner
- Release date: February 2, 1936
- Running time: 58 minutes
- Country: United States
- Language: English

Señor Jim is a 1936 American Western film directed by Jacques Jaccard and starring Conway Tearle, Barbara Bedford and Alberta Dugan.

== Cast ==
- Conway Tearle as Jim Stafford
- Barbara Bedford as Mona Cartier
- Alberta Dugan as Carole Cartier
- Fred Malatesta as Nick Zellini
- Betty Mack as Bunny Stafford
- Dirk Thane as Roxy Stone
- Evelyn Hagara as Maysie
- Robert McKenzie as Sheriff Bob Arnett
- Harrison Greene as Boomer
- Ashton and Co'ena as Dance Team
- Tove Linden as Adele Thorne
- Lloyd Brooks as Kent Hollis
- Budd Buster as Deputy
- Jack Evans as Townsman

== Bibliography ==
- Pitts, Michael R. Western Movies: A Guide to 5,105 Feature Films. McFarland, 2012.
