= Gigolettes of Paris =

1933 film

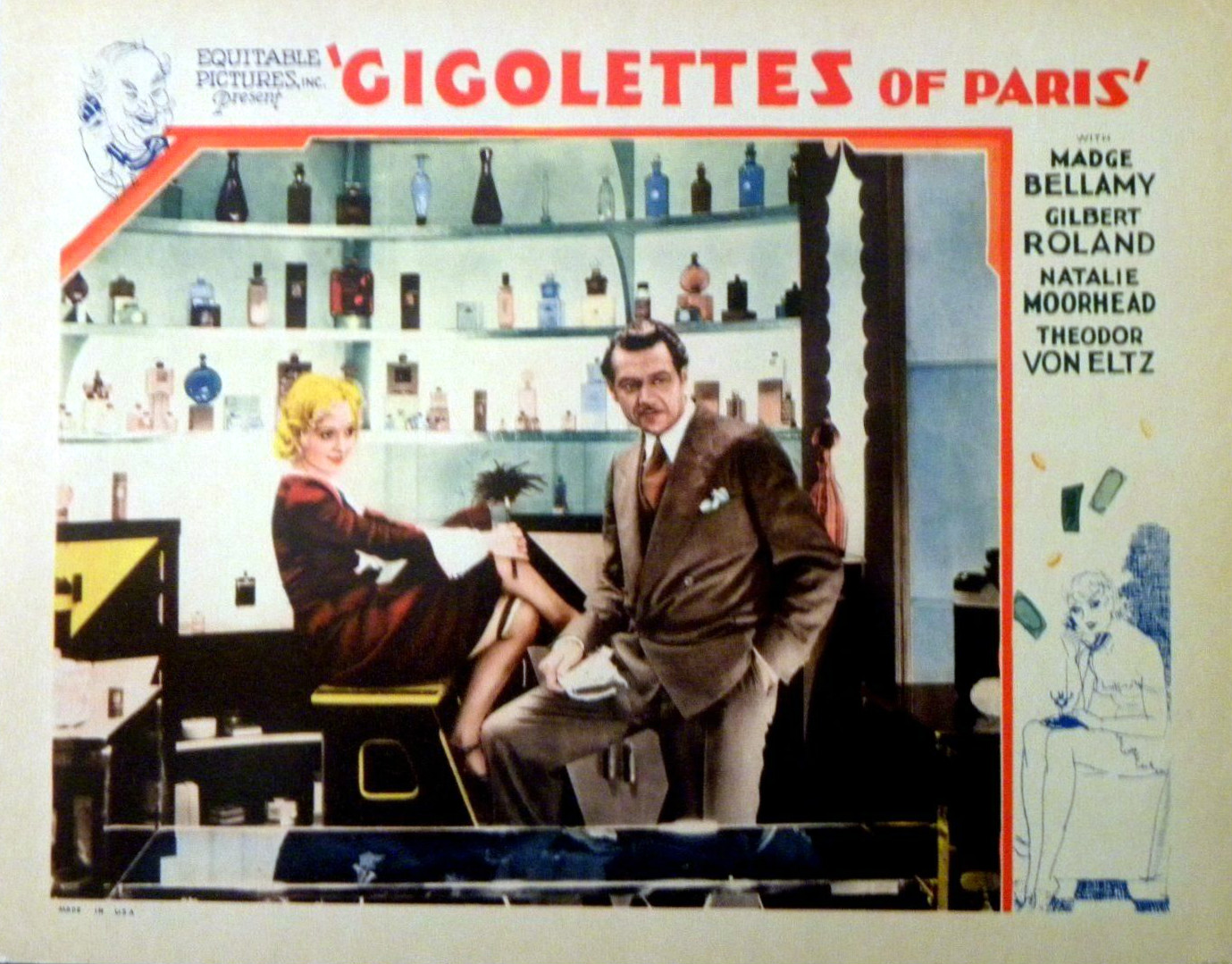
- Lobby card
- Directed by: Alphonse Martell
- Written by: Alphonse Martell; Mary Flannery (additional dialogue)
- Produced by: Larry Darmour
- Starring: Madge Bellamy; Gilbert Roland; Molly O'Day
- Cinematography: Thomas Persons; Otis Garrett (uncredited)
- Music by: Darby St. John
- Production company: Larry Darmour Productions
- Distributed by: Equitable Pictures; Majestic Pictures
- Release date: December 6, 1933
- Running time: 61 minutes
- Country: United States
- Language: English

Gigolettes of Paris (released in the United Kingdom as Tarnished Youth) is a 1933 American movie written and directed by Alphonse Martell starring Madge Bellamy and Gilbert Roland featuring a A romance between a salesgirl, a wealthy count, and another man.

== Plot ==
Suzanne and her best friend and roommate Paulette work as shopgirls in a Paris parfumerie. Suzanne is swept off her feet by the well to do Albert Valraine who she becomes engaged to. Later, Albert takes his ring back and bits her adieu, laughing that Suzanne doesn't know the game. Brokenhearted, Suzette and Paulette become gigolettes obtaining jewelry from their rich paramours.

At a night club Suzette sees Albert with a woman named Diane who is wearing the same ring Albert took back from Suzette. Suzette plots her revenge using Antoine the gigolo to use his wiles to get the ring off Diane in order to humiliate Albert.

The battle of the sexes builds with one of them accused of murder, an excursion to Monte Carlo and a surprise marriage.

== Production ==
Martell, a French actor who had by then appeared in many small roles in American films, wrote the story and directed it, his only credits of the sort.

The movie's original title was Gold Diggers of Paris but a lawsuit from Warner Bros. (which had released Gold Diggers of Broadway in 1929 and Gold DIggers of 1933 months before Martell's movie) prevented the use of the name. In 1938 Warner released a movie called Gold Diggers in Paris.

The film used RCA Photophone Recording.

== Cast ==
- Madge Bellamy as Suzanne Ricord
- Gilbert Roland as Antoine 'Tony' Ferrand
- Natalie Moorhead as Diane Valraine
- Theodore Von Eltz as Albert Valraine
- Molly O'Day as Paulette
- Henry Kolker as Police Inspector
- Paul Porcasi
- Albert Conti
