= The Cradle of Courage =

1920 film by William S. Hart

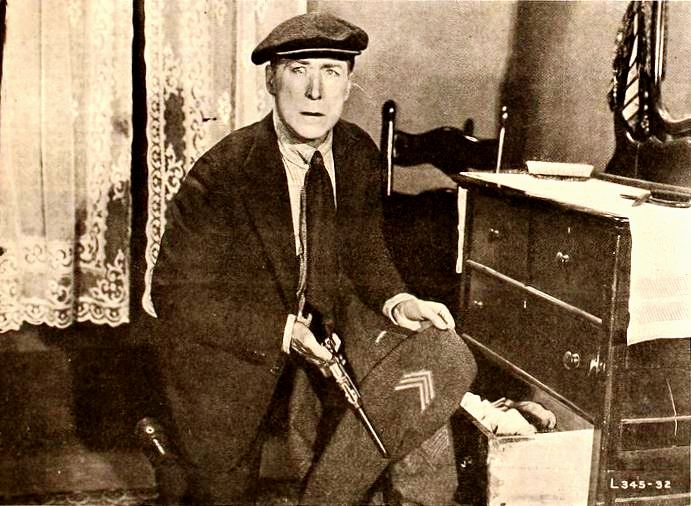
- Still with William S. Hart
- Directed by: Lambert Hillyer
- Screenplay by: Frederick Bradbury; Lambert Hillyer
- Produced by: William S. Hart
- Starring: William S. Hart; Ann Little; Tom Santschi; Gertrude Claire; Frank Thorwald; George Williams
- Cinematography: Joseph H. August
- Production company: William S. Hart Productions
- Distributed by: Paramount Pictures
- Release date: September 19, 1920
- Running time: 50 minutes
- Country: United States
- Language: Silent (English intertitles)

The Cradle of Courage

The Cradle of Courage is a 1920 American silent drama film directed by Lambert Hillyer and written by Frederick Bradbury and Lambert Hillyer. The film stars William S. Hart, Ann Little, Tom Santschi, Gertrude Claire, Frank Thorwald, and George Williams. The film was released on September 19, 1920, by Paramount Pictures. Copies of the film are in the Museum of Modern Art and at other film archives.

== Plot ==
A former criminal serves in the military in World War I, and is convinced by a man he served with to join the police when he returns. However, upon his return, he is confronted with policing members of his old gang.

== Cast ==
- William S. Hart as 'Square' Kelly
- Ann Little as Rose Tierney
- Tom Santschi as Tierney
- Gertrude Claire as Mother Kelly
- Frank Thorwald as Jim Kelly
- George Williams as Lieutenant Riley
- Barbara Bedford as Nora

== Preservation status ==
Copies of The Cradle of Courage are held by Cinematheque Royale de Belgique (Brussels), Museum of Modern Art (New York City), Library of Congress, UCLA Film & Television Archive, and the Berkeley Art Museum and Pacific Film Archive.
