= Sundown (1924 film) =

1924 film

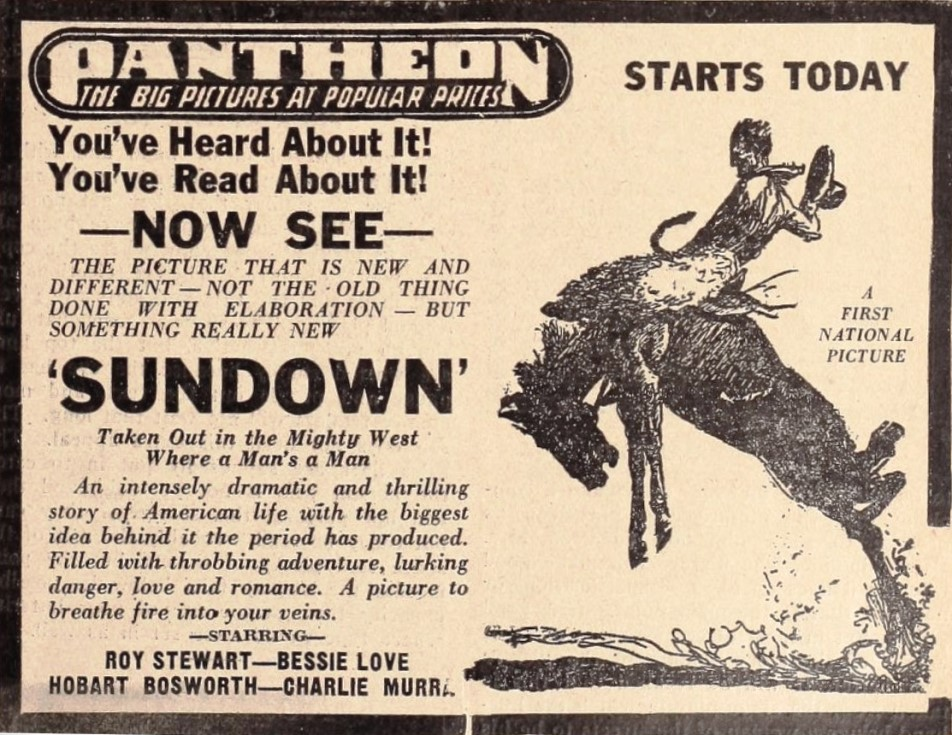
- Newspaper advertisement
- Directed by: Laurence Trimble; Harry O. Hoyt
- Written by: Frances Marion (scenario); Marion Fairfax (scenario); Kenneth B. Clarke (scenario)
- Story by: Earl Hudson
- Starring: Bessie Love
- Cinematography: David Thompson
- Edited by: Cyril Gardner
- Production company: First National Pictures
- Distributed by: First National Pictures (as Associated First National)
- Release dates: November 30, 1924 (U.S.); December 7, 1925 (Finland); May 1926 (Germany)
- Running time: 9 reels; 8,640 feet
- Country: United States
- Language: Silent (English intertitles)

Sundown is a 1924 American silent Western film directed by Laurence Trimble and Harry O. Hoyt, produced and distributed by First National Pictures, and starring Bessie Love. Frances Marion, Marion Fairfax, and Kenneth B. Clarke wrote the screenplay based on an original screen story by Earl Hudson. This film was the only production cinematographer David Thompson ever worked on. This film is presumed lost.

== Production ==
It was primarily filmed on location in Texas, on a plateau 75 miles (121 km) outside of El Paso.

== Plot ==
In the American West, tensions between ranchers and homesteaders rise as homesteads take over land that ranchers need for their cattle. John Brent and his son Hugh decide to drive their cattle to Mexico and settle there. Their cattle stampede, destroying the home of the Crawleys. Young Ellen Crawley convinces the Brents to let her family accompany them to Mexico. Hugh and Ellen fall in love.

== Cast ==
- Bessie Love as Ellen Crawley
- Roy Stewart as Hugh Brent
- Hobart Bosworth as John Brent
- Arthur Hoyt as Henry Crawley
- Charlie Murray as Pat Meech
- Jere Austin as John Burke
- Charles Crockett as Joe Patton
- E. J. Ratcliffe as President Theodore Roosevelt
- Margaret McWade as Mrs. Brent
- Bernard Randall as William Dickson
- Charles Sellon as ranchman
- Hal Wilson as ranch owner (uncredited)

== Reception ==
The film was universally well-reviewed.
