= A Texas Steer =

1927 film by Richard Wallace

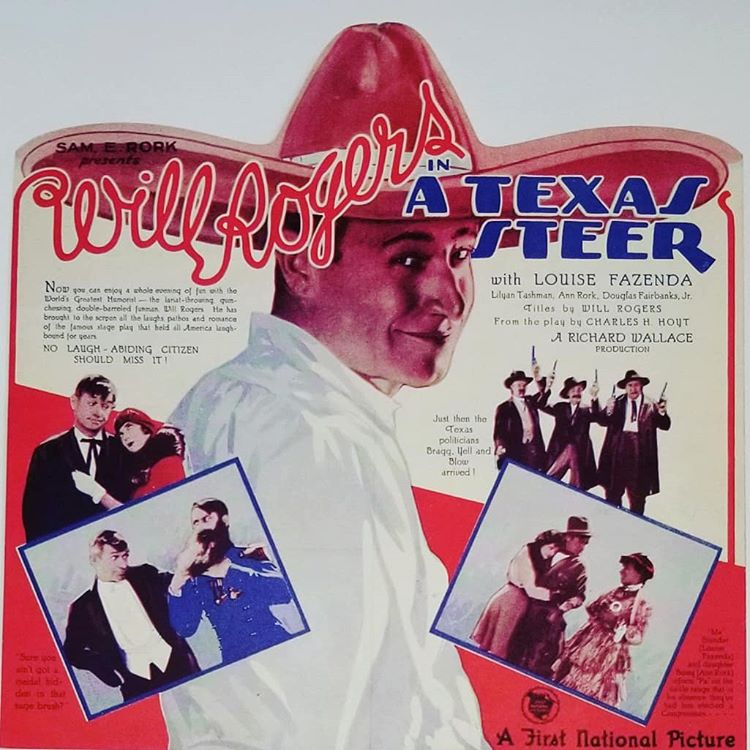
- Directed by: Richard Wallace
- Written by: Garrett Graham; Bernard McConville; Will Rogers; Paul Schofield
- Produced by: Sam E. Rork
- Starring: Will Rogers
- Cinematography: Jack MacKenzie
- Edited by: Frank Lawrence
- Distributed by: First National Pictures
- Release date: December 4, 1927
- Running time: 80 Minute
- Country: United States
- Language: Silent (English intertitles)

A Texas Steer is a 1927 American silent comedy film directed by Richard Wallace and starring Will Rogers. It was a cinematic adaptation from an eponymous play by Charles H. Hoyt.

== Plot summary ==
Maverick Brander, a newly elected Congressman from the fictional town of Red Dog, Texas, moves to Washington, D.C. to serve in the United States House of Representatives. He supports the Eagle Rock Dam bill. Meanwhile, he flirts with a woman.

== Cast ==
- Will Rogers as Maverick Brander
- Louise Fazenda as Mrs. Ma Brander
- Sam Hardy as Brassy Gall
- Ann Rork as Bossy Brander
- Douglas Fairbanks, Jr. as Farleigh Bright
- Lilyan Tashman as Dixie Style
- George F. Marion as Fishback
- Bud Jamison as Othello (as Bud Jamieson)
- Arthur Hoyt as Knott Innitt
- Mack Swain as Bragg
- William Orlamond as Blow
- Lucien Littlefield as Yell

== Critical reception ==
The film was reviewed in The New York Times by film critic Mordaunt Hall in 1928. He noted, "There are passages in this film that are rowdy, but there are also a good many witty episodes."

== Preservation ==
With no copies of A Texas Steer located in any film archives, it is considered a lost film.
