= Ann Rork Light =

American actress

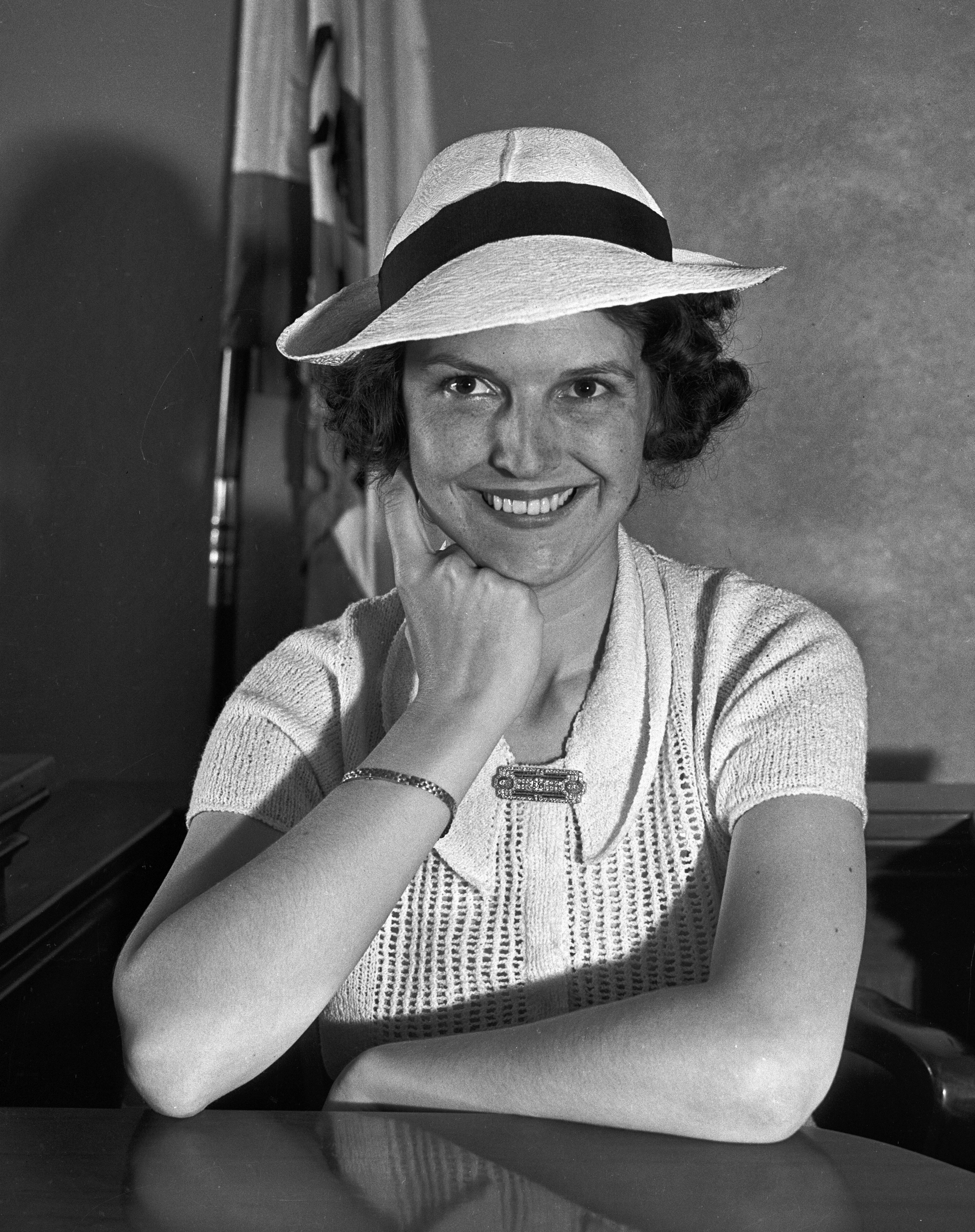
- During her divorce from J. Paul Getty, 1935
- Born: Helen Ann Rork; June 12, 1908; Darien, Connecticut, US
- Died: January 23, 1988 (aged 79); Nashville, Tennessee, US
- Occupation: Actress
- Spouses: J. Paul Getty (m. 1932; div. 1935): Herbert Douglas Wilson; Jay Ruppert Ross; Joseph Stanton McInerney; Dr. Rudolph Alvin Light (m. 1960; died 1970)
- Children: 3, including John Paul Getty Jr. and Gordon Getty
- Parent: Sam E. Rork

Helen Ann Rork Light (June 12, 1908 – January 23, 1988) was an American silent film actress. She was credited under the name Ann Rork.

== Early life ==
Helen Ann Rork was born June 12, 1908, in Darien, Connecticut. Her father, Sam E. Rork, was a film producer at First National Pictures, and her mother the former Helen Welch. Actor Will Rogers was her godfather.

== Career ==
She starred in silent films such as The Blonde Saint and Old Loves and New in 1926, followed by The Notorious Lady, A Texas Steer and The Prince of Headwaiters in 1927. Her co-stars included Will Rogers and Rudolph Valentino.

== Personal life ==
She was married five times. Her first husband was J. Paul Getty, an oil heir from San Francisco, California, from 1932 to 1935. They had two sons: John Paul Getty Jr. and Gordon Getty.

She then married a succession of three other men. In 1960, she married her fifth husband, Dr. Rudolph A. Light, an Upjohn Pharmaceutical Company heir and Professor of Neurosurgery at Vanderbilt University in Nashville, Tennessee. Rork became the first female member of St Catherine's College, Oxford, being awarded an Honorary Fellowship in the 1970s in recognition of her and Dr Light's philanthropic donations to the College.

== Death ==
She died of emphysema and lung cancer on January 23, 1988, at the Vanderbilt University Medical Center. She is buried with her husband Dr. Rudolph Light, at the Royal Palm Memorial Gardens in West Palm Beach, Florida. She was seventy-nine years old.
