= Framed (1927 film) =

1927 film

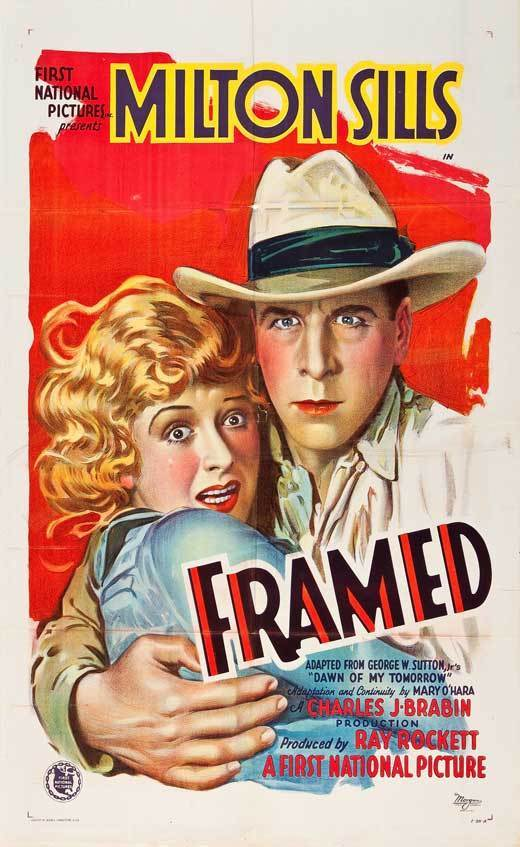
- Theatrical release poster
- Directed by: Charles Brabin
- Screenplay by: Mary O'Hara
- Based on: The Dawn of My Tomorrow by George W. Sutton Jr.
- Starring: Milton Sills; Natalie Kingston; E. J. Ratcliffe; Charles K. Gerrard; Edward Peil Sr. Burr McIntosh
- Cinematography: Charles Van Enger
- Production company: First National Pictures
- Distributed by: First National Pictures
- Release date: June 19, 1927
- Running time: 60 minutes
- Country: United States
- Language: English

Framed is a 1927 American drama film directed by Charles Brabin and written by Mary O'Hara. The film stars Milton Sills, Natalie Kingston, E. J. Ratcliffe, Charles K. Gerrard, Edward Peil Sr. and Burr McIntosh. The film was released on June 19, 1927, by First National Pictures.

== Cast ==
- Milton Sills as Etienne Hilaire
- Natalie Kingston as Diane Laurens
- E. J. Ratcliffe as Alphonse Laurens
- Charles K. Gerrard as Arthur Remsen
- Edward Peil Sr. as Moola
- Burr McIntosh as Magistrate
- Natli Barr as Lola
- John Miljan as Lola's Husband
