= After Tonight =

1933 film directed by George Archainbaud

- theatrical release poster
- Directed by: George Archainbaud
- Written by: Jane Murfin (story and adaptation)
- Screenplay by: Albert S. Le Vino (adaptation); Worthington Miner (adaptation); Robert Benchley {uncredited}
- Produced by: Merian C. Cooper
- Starring: Constance Bennett; Gilbert Roland
- Cinematography: Charles Rosher
- Edited by: William Hamilton
- Music by: Max Steiner (music dir.); Will Jason; Val Burton
- Production company: RKO Radio Pictures
- Distributed by: RKO Radio Pictures
- Release date: October 26, 1933
- Running time: 71 minutes
- Country: United States
- Language: English
- Budget: $355,000
- Box office: $380,000

After Tonight is a 1933 American pre-Code World War I spy film directed by George Archainbaud and starring Constance Bennett and Gilbert Roland. The studio considered firing Bennett after the film lost $100,000 at the box office.

== Plot ==
With the outbreak of World War I, a young woman is unable to purchase a train ticket from Luxembourg to Austria. However, Rudolph "Rudy" Ritter is attracted to her and gets her aboard a train to Bern, Switzerland. Later, when the train is stopped short of their destination, she slips away while he goes in search of a car. He does not even know her name.

Rudy turns out to be a captain in the Austrian Ministry of War assigned to deal with Russian spies, particularly the very successful K-14. He gets a lead when a secret message is intercepted; it contains information about a newly improved flamethrower. Rudy is assigned to Major Lieber, the man in charge of the unit developing the weapon.

Rudy is delighted when Lieber introduces him to nurse Karen Schöntag, his former traveling companion. Rudy sees Karen every night, and the pair fall in love. However, Karen is actually K-14. She narrowly escapes being caught by Rudy and his men, then is brought in for questioning when she goes to a certain staircase that Rudy knows is being used by the Russians to transfer messages. Rudy refuses to believe she is a spy and does not even search her. Major Lieber, however, notices something odd about one of the books she had with her; one page has been freshly torn out (the one with an invisible message).

Faced with the mounting evidence, Rudy sets a trap. He has Russian-speaking Private Muller sent to K-14's hospital masquerading as a prisoner of war. Muller gives K-14 the Russian recognition signal (two circles) and passes her a message, ordering her to meet an agent at a deserted house at nine o'clock that night. K-14 is suspicious, but feels she must go. Her contact insists on taking her there. After she incriminates herself to "Russian" agent Lehan, Rudy is forced to arrest her. K-14's associate shoots Rudy and knocks out Lehan. He has to drag K-14 away from the wounded Rudy, who also urges her to flee.

After the war ends, the two meet by chance at a Swiss train station. This time, Rudy does not let her get away.

== Cast ==
- Constance Bennett as Carla Vanirska, aka K-14 and Karen Schöntag
- Gilbert Roland as Captain Rudolph "Rudy" Ritter
- Edward Ellis as Major Lieber
- Lucien Prival as Lieutenant Erlich
- Ben Hendricks Jr. as Sergeant Probert
- Leonid Snegoff as Private Muller
- John Wray as Mitika
- Mischa Auer as Adjutant Lehan
- Evelyn Carter Carrington as Frau Stengel
- Sam Godfrey as Franz
- Landers Stevens as Major
- Leo White as Officer (uncredited)

== Production ==
Working titles for the film were "Free Lady", "The Woman Spy" and "Without Glory". In 1934, Daily Variety reported that a plagiarism suit had been filed against the film by Baroness Carla Jenssen, who claimed that the story of the film wa an unauthorized version of her own story, "She Spys", but the outcome of the suit is unknown.

== Reception ==
Mordaunt Hall was unimpressed with the film, writing in The New York Times that it "taxes one's credulity" and that Roland's performance was "hardly satisfactory", though he thought "Miss Bennett does her work as well as it is possible in the circumstances."

RKO lost $100,000 on the film.
