= The Face of the World =

1921 silent film

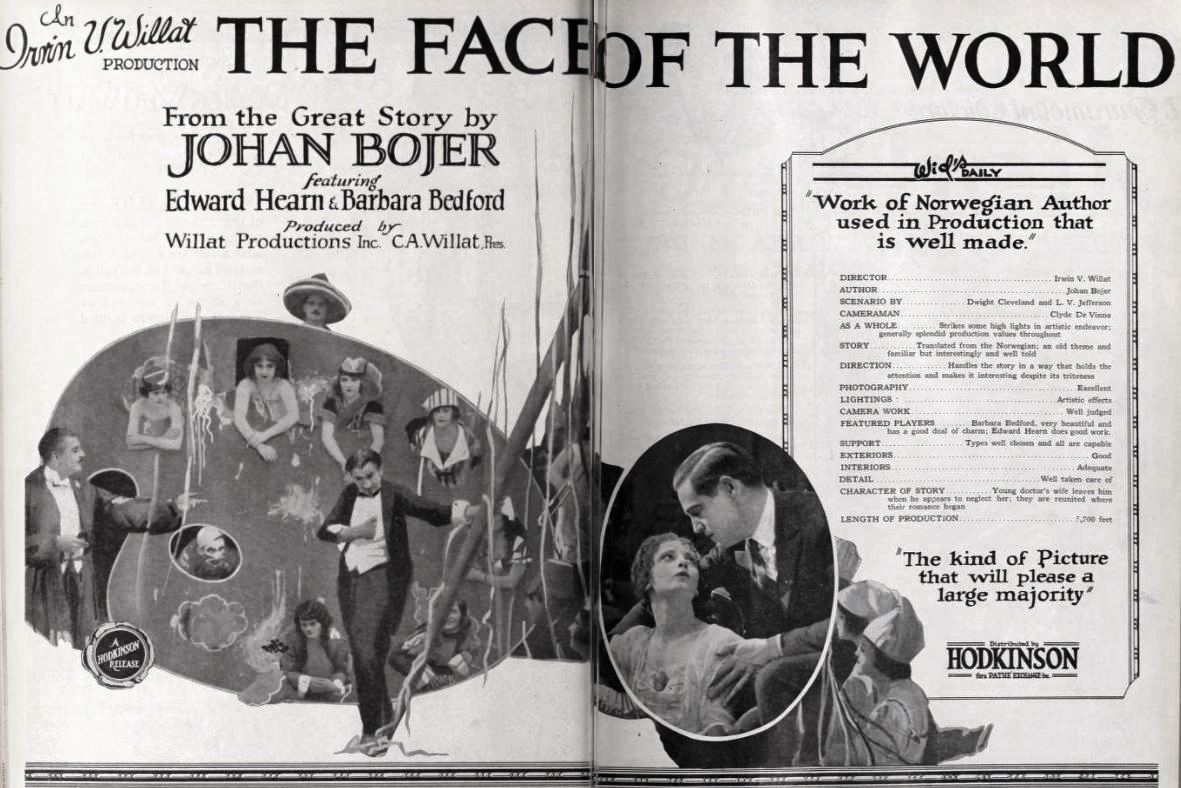
- Directed by: Irvin Willat
- Written by: Dwight Cleveland; L.V. Jefferson
- Starring: Edward Hearn; Barbara Bedford; Lloyd Whitlock
- Cinematography: Clyde De Vinna
- Production company: Irvin V. Willat Productions
- Distributed by: Hodkinson Pictures
- Release date: August 21, 1921
- Running time: 60 minutes
- Country: United States
- Languages: Silent; English intertitles

The Face of the World is a 1921 American silent drama film directed by Irvin Willat and starring Edward Hearn, Barbara Bedford and Lloyd Whitlock.

== Cast ==
- Edward Hearn as Harold Mark
- Barbara Bedford as Thora
- Harry Duffield as Grandfather
- Lloyd Whitlock as Monsieur Duparc
- Gordon Mullen as Ivar Holth
- J.P. Lockney as Dr. Prahl
- Fred Huntley as Attorney Gundahl

== Bibliography ==
- Munden, Kenneth White. The American Film Institute Catalog of Motion Pictures Produced in the United States, Part 1. University of California Press, 1997.
