= Barbara Bedford (actress) =

American actress (1903–1981)

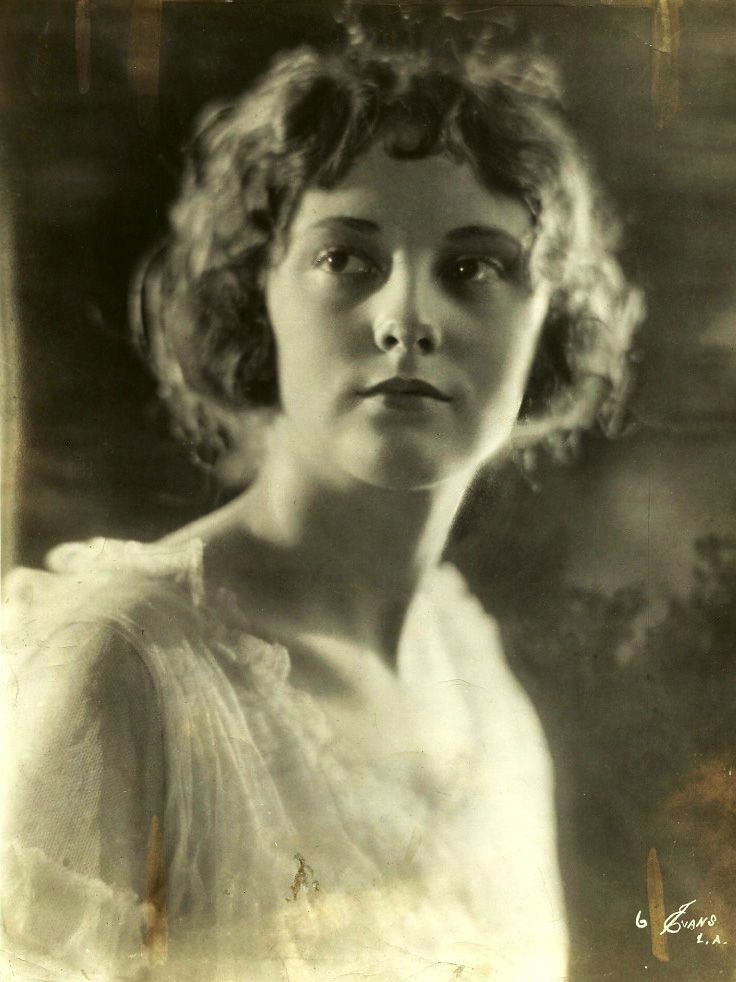
- Bedford, c. 1920
- Born: Violet May Rose; July 19, 1903; Prairie du Chien, Wisconsin, U.S.
- Died: October 25, 1981 (aged 78); Jacksonville, Florida, U.S.
- Other name: Violet Spencer
- Occupation: Actress
- Years active: 1920–1945
- Spouses: Irvin Willat (m. 1921; div. 1922) Alan Roscoe (m. 1922; div. 1928) (m. 1930; died 1933) Terry Spencer (m. 1940; died 1954)
- Children: 1

Barbara Bedford (born Violet May Rose; July 19, 1903 – October 25, 1981) was an American actress who appeared in dozens of silent movies. Her career declined after the introduction of sound, but she continued to appear in small roles until 1945.

== Early life ==
Barbara Bedford was born Violet May Rose on July 19, 1903, the first child to Robert William Rose, a Scottish-American interior decorator, and Barbara Rose (née Fish), who was a first-generation Czech-American. She had a brother, William Rose. The 1910 census lists the family as living in Denver, Colorado.

She was educated in Chicago and attended Lake View High School. According to Bedford, prior to becoming an actress, she taught swimming, dancing, and gymnastics and worked as an accountant.

== Career ==
=== Film ===
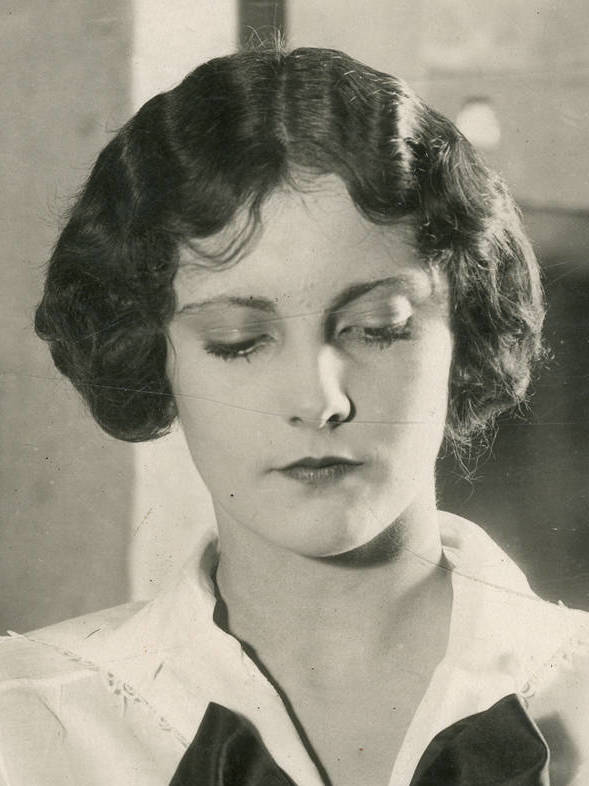
Barbara Bedford in Step on It! (1922)

Bedford dropped out of high school after completing 10th grade to pursue a career in film. She, alongside her family, relocated to Los Angeles. She had written many fan letters to actor William S. Hart, and he helped her get a small role in his 1920 movie The Cradle of Courage. While working as an extra that same year on The White Circle, she was noticed by fellow cast member John Gilbert, who recommended her to director Maurice Tourneur. Tourneur cast her alongside Gilbert in Deep Waters. Tourneur also cast her in The Last of the Mohicans, where she was the love interest for Alan Roscoe, whom she later married in real life.

In 1925, she appeared opposite Hart in his final film, Tumbleweeds, a key Western of the silent period. She starred in the 1926 silent film Old Loves and New and in Mockery with Lon Chaney the following year.

=== Stage ===
Bedford played Andre in Ayn Rand's Woman on Trial (better known as Night of January 16th) when it opened at the Hollywood Playhouse on October 22, 1934.

== Personal life ==
In 1921, she married Irvin Willat, who had directed her earlier that year in The Face of the World. They divorced in less than a year. In August 1922, she married fellow actor Alan Roscoe. They divorced in 1928, but remarried in 1930. They had one daughter, Barbara Edith Roscoe. When her husband died in 1933, Bedford had a legal dispute with his friend Wallace Beery over life insurance money that Beery claimed was owed to him for debts, but which Bedford said was intended for her daughter's education.

Bedford's third and longest marriage was to actor Terry Spencer. They were married from 1940 until his death in 1954.

== Later years and death ==
After Spencer died, Bedford lived in Jacksonville, Florida, using the name Violet Spencer as she worked in retail sales. She and her daughter, Barbara, moved to Shreveport, Louisiana, in the 1970s.

Bedford died in Jacksonville, Florida, on October 25, 1981, aged 78.

== Filmography ==
=== Features ===
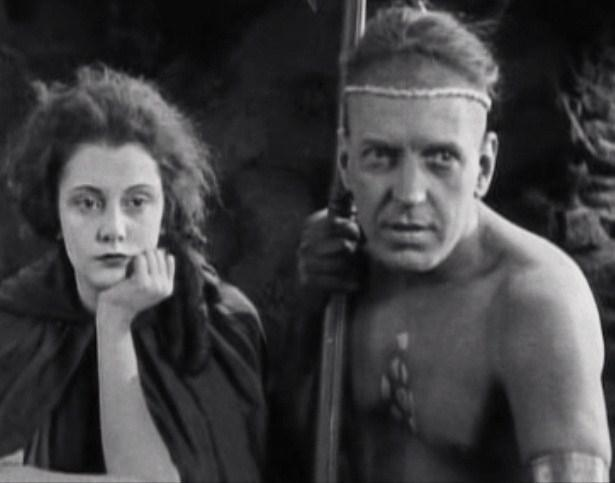
Bedford and her future husband Alan Roscoe in The Last of the Mohicans

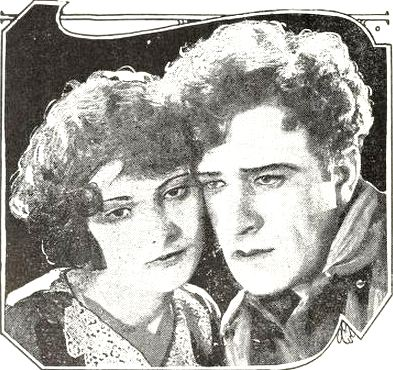
Bedford with Frank Mayo in Out of the Silent North

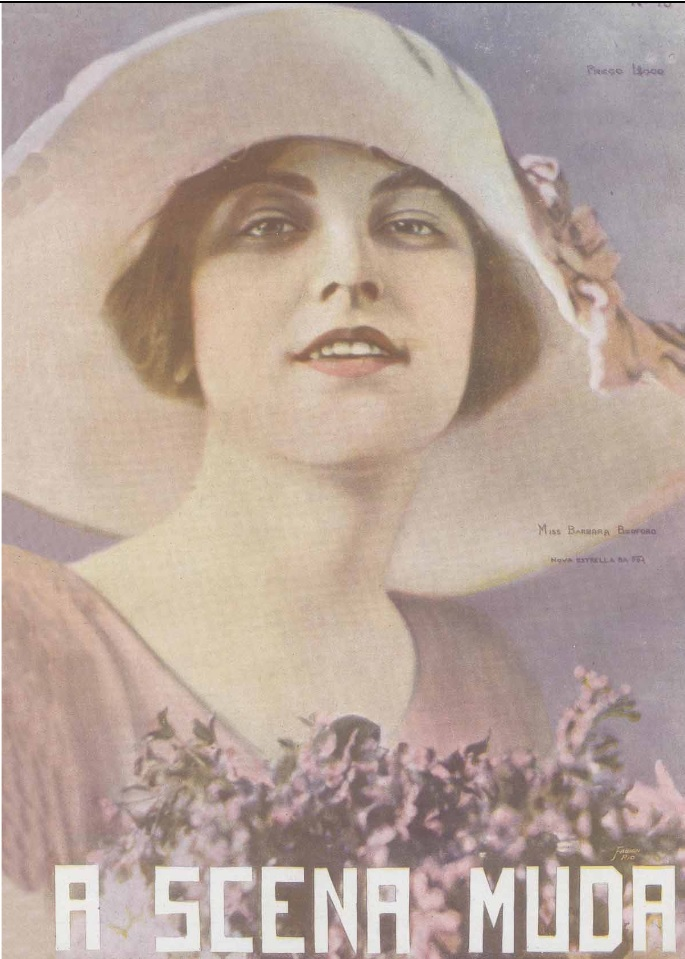
Portrait of Bedford on the cover the Brazilian movie magazine A Scena Muda in 1922

- The Cradle of Courage (1920) as Nora
- Deep Waters (1920) as Betty West
- The Last of the Mohicans (1920) as Cora Munro
- Down Home (1920) as Minor Role (uncredited)
- The Big Punch (1921) as Hope Standish
- The Face of the World (1921) as Thora
- Cinderella of the Hills (1921) as Norris Gradley
- The Unfoldment (1922) as Martha Osborne
- Gleam O'Dawn (1922) as Nini
- Winning with Wits (1922) as Mary Sudan / Mary Wyatt
- Arabian Love (1922) as Nadine Fortier
- Man Under Cover (1922) as Margaret Langdon
- Step on It! (1922) as Lorraine Leighton
- Out of the Silent North (1922) as Marcette Vallois
- Alias Julius Caesar (1922) as Helen
- The Power of Love (1922) as Maria Almeda
- Tom Mix in Arabia (1922) as Janice Terhune
- Another Man's Shoes (1922) as Mercia Solano
- Romance Land (1923) as Nan Harvess
- The Tie That Binds (1923) as Mary Ellen Gray
- The Power of Love (also called Forbidden Lover) (1923)
- The Spoilers (1923) as Helen Chester
- The Acquittal (1923) as Edith Craig
- The Whipping Boss (1924) as Grace Woodward
- Women Who Give (1924) as Emily Swift
- Pagan Passions (1924) as Shirley Dangerfield
- Champion of Lost Causes (1925) as Beatrice Charles
- The Mansion of Aching Hearts (1925) as Martha
- The Mad Whirl (1925) as Margie Taylor
- Percy (1925) as Imogene Chandler
- The Talker (1925) as Barbara Farley
- The Business of Love (1925) as Barbara Richmond
- Before Midnight (1925) as Helen Saldivar
- What Fools Men (1925) as Jenny McFarlan
- Tumbleweeds (1925) as Molly Lassiter
- Old Loves and New (1926) as Marny
- The Sporting Lover (1926) as Lady Gwendolyn
- Devil's Dice (1926) as Helen Paine
- Sunshine of Paradise Alley (1926) as Sunshine O'Day
- Life of an Actress (1927) as Nora Dowen
- The Notorious Lady (1927) as Mary Marlowe / Mary Brownlee
- Backstage (1927) as Julia Joyce
- Mockery (1927) as Countess Tatiana Alexandrova
- The Girl from Gay Paree (1927) as Mary Davis
- A Man's Past (1927) as Yvonne Fontaine
- The Broken Mask (1928) as Caricia
- Marry the Girl (1928) as Elinor
- The Port of Missing Girls (1928) as Ruth King
- Manhattan Knights (1928) as Margaret
- The City of Purple Dreams (1928) as Esther Strom
- Bitter Sweets (1928) as Bett Kingston
- The Cavalier (1928) as Lucia D'Arquista
- The Haunted House (1928) as Nancy
- Smoke Bellew (1929) as Joy Gastrell
- The Heroic Lover (1929)
- Brothers (1929) as Doris LaRue
- The Love Trader (1930) as Luane
- Sunny (1930) as Margaret
- Tol'able David (1930) as Rose Kinemon
- The Lash (1930) as Lupe
- Desert Vengeance (1931) as Anne Dixon
- The Lady from Nowhere (1931) as Mollie Carter
- Too Busy to Work (1932) as Molly Hardy (scenes deleted)
- The Death Kiss (1932) as Script Girl
- Found Alive (1933) as Edith Roberts
- A Girl of the Limberlost (1934) as Elvira Carney
- Tomorrow's Youth (1934) as Miss Booth
- The World Accuses (1934) as Martha Rankin
- Sons of Steel (1934) as Miss Peters
- Circumstantial Evidence (1935) as Mrs. Goodwin (uncredited)
- On Probation (1935) as Mable Gordon
- The Keeper of the Bees (1935) as Nurse
- Condemned to Live (1935) as Martha Kristan
- The Spanish Cape Mystery (1935) as Mrs. Munn
- Three Kids and a Queen (1935) as Nurse (uncredited)
- Midnight Phantom (1935) as Kathleen Ryan
- Forced Landing (1935) as Mrs. Margaret Byrd
- Senor Jim (1936) as Mona Cartier
- Tango (1936) as Carver, Enright & Burt Receptionist (uncredited)
- Ring Around the Moon (1936) as Carol Anderson
- Brilliant Marriage (1936) as Brenda
- The Mine with the Iron Door (1936) as Secretary
- Speed (1936) as Nurse (uncredited)
- Easy Money (1936) as Mrs. Turner
- His Brother's Wife (1936) as Minor Role (uncredited)
- Born to Dance (1936) as Hector's Secretary (uncredited)
- A Day at the Races (1937) as Secretary (uncredited)
- Between Two Women (1937) as Sarah - Patricia's Maid (uncredited)
- Big City (1937) as Woman Who Screams (uncredited)
- Navy Blue and Gold (1937) as Hospital Nurse (uncredited)
- The First Hundred Years (1938) as Sadie (uncredited)
- Three Comrades (1938) as Rita - Singer Accompanied by Erich (uncredited)
- The Toy Wife (1938) as Woman in Doctor's Office (uncredited)
- Woman Against Woman (1938) as Nurse Sherwood (uncredited)
- Fast Company (1938) as MacMillen's Secretary (uncredited)
- The Chaser (1938) as Brandon's Secretary (uncredited)
- Rich Man, Poor Girl (1938) as Kate (uncredited)
- Boys Town (1938) as Catholic Nun (uncredited)
- Too Hot to Handle (1938) as MacArthur's Secretary (uncredited)
- Young Dr. Kildare (1938) as Nurse (uncredited)
- The Girl Downstairs (1938) as Anna (uncredited)
- Burn 'Em Up O'Connor (1939) as Woman in Movie House (uncredited)
- Four Girls in White (1939) as Nurse Behind Counter (uncredited)
- Idiot's Delight (1939) as Nurse #1 (uncredited)
- Within the Law (1939) as Sarah - Gilder's Secretary (uncredited)
- Sergeant Madden (1939) as Nurse (uncredited)
- Broadway Serenade (1939) as Gracie (uncredited)
- Calling Dr. Kildare (1939) as Dr. Carew's Secretary (uncredited)
- Stronger Than Desire (1939) as Miss Watson - Flagg's Secretary (uncredited)
- On Borrowed Time (1939) as Mrs. James Northrup (uncredited)
- Andy Hardy Gets Spring Fever (1939) as Miss Howard - Bank Secretary (uncredited)
- Dancing Co-Ed (1939) as Secretary (voice, uncredited)
- Bad Little Angel (1939) as Mrs. Dodd (scenes deleted)
- Joe and Ethel Turp Call on the President (1939) as Neighbor (uncredited)
- The Earl of Chicago (1940) as Martha Jackson (uncredited)
- Edison, the Man (1940) as General Powell's Nurse (uncredited)
- Florian (1940) as Kingston's Secretary (uncredited)
- We Who Are Young (1940) as Hospital Phone Operator (uncredited)
- Gold Rush Maisie (1940) as Mrs. Hartley (uncredited)
- I Love You Again (1940) as Miss Stingecombe - Larry's Secretary (uncredited)
- Boom Town (1940) as Nurse (uncredited)
- Dr. Kildare Goes Home (1940) as Carew's Secretary (uncredited)
- Sky Murder (1940) as Grand's Maid (uncredited)
- Third Finger, Left Hand (1940) as Woman at Railroad Station (uncredited)
- Little Nellie Kelly (1940) as Miss Wilson - Nurse with Baby (uncredited)
- Go West (1940) as Baby's Mother on Stagecoach (uncredited)
- Maisie Was a Lady (1941) as Nurse (uncredited)
- Men of Boys Town (1941) as Nun in Infirmary (uncredited)
- The People vs. Dr. Kildare (1941) as Dr. Carew's Secretary (uncredited)
- Love Crazy (1941) as Renny's Secretary (uncredited)
- The Getaway (1941) as Dr. Glass' Maid (uncredited)
- Whistling in the Dark (1941) as Cult Member / Telephone Operator (uncredited)
- When Ladies Meet (1941) as Anna (uncredited)
- Honky Tonk (1941) as Salvation Army Woman (uncredited)
- Babes on Broadway (1941) as Juror at Radio Broadcast (uncredited)
- Babes on Broadway (1941) as Mrs. Crainen, the Matron (uncredited)
- Nazi Agent (1942) as Woman (uncredited)
- The Vanishing Virginian (1942) as Mildred Simpson (uncredited)
- Mr. and Mrs. North (1942) as Lucille, Mrs. Brent's Maid (uncredited)
- Dr. Kildare's Victory (1942) as Dr. Carew's Secretary (uncredited)
- Born to Sing (1942) as Woman at Accident Scene (uncredited)
- We Were Dancing (1942) as Tearful Courtroom Spectator (uncredited)
- The Courtship of Andy Hardy (1942) as Elsa, Nesbit's Maid (uncredited)
- Ship Ahoy (1942) as Mrs. Loring (uncredited)
- Tortilla Flat (1942) as Nun (uncredited)
- Calling Dr. Gillespie (1942) as Carew's Secretary Bringing Postcard (uncredited)
- Reunion in France (1942) as Mme. Vigouroux (uncredited)
- The Human Comedy (1943) as Woman on Street (uncredited)
- Assignment in Brittany (1943) as Surgical Nurse (uncredited)
- Slightly Dangerous (1943) as Customer (uncredited)
- Presenting Lily Mars (1943) as Assistant Boardinghouse Manager (uncredited)
- Dr. Gillespie's Criminal Case (1943) as Secretary (uncredited)
- Du Barry Was a Lady (1943) as Ambrose's Wife (uncredited)
- Best Foot Forward (1943) as Chaperon at Dance (uncredited)
- The Cross of Lorraine (1943) as Village Woman (uncredited)
- Lost Angel (1943) as Telephone Operator (uncredited)
- Andy Hardy's Blonde Trouble (1944) as Dean's Secretary (uncredited)
- Meet the People (1944) as Ritz Patron (uncredited)
- An American Romance (1944) as Hospitable Farm Woman (uncredited)
- The Clock (1945) as USO Manager (uncredited)
- Girls of the Big House (1945) as Visitors Matron (uncredited) (final film role)

=== Shorts ===
- Three on a Limb (1936) as Addie
- The Public Pays (1936) as Markovitz's Secretary (uncredited)
- The Grand Bounce (1937) as Doctor's Secretary (uncredited)
- Song of Revolt (1937) as Peasant Woman (uncredited)
- It May Happen to You (1937) as Nurse (uncredited)
- Miracle Money (1938) as Miss Grant (uncredited)
- That Mothers Might Live (1938) as Nun Reading Book (uncredited)
- Come Across (1938) as Bank Employee (uncredited)
- How to Read (1938) as Dental Patient (uncredited)
- Nostradamus (1938) as Minor Role (uncredited)
- Men in Fright (1938) as Sonny's Mother (uncredited)
- Football Romeo (1938) as Alfalfa's Mother
- Alfalfa's Aunt (1939) as Martha Switzer (uncredited)
- Tiny Troubles (1939) as Alfalfa's mother
- Radio Hams (1939) as Mrs. Crane (uncredited)
- Angel of Mercy (1939) as Nurse (uncredited)
- One Against the World (1939) as Townswoman (uncredited)
- Think First (1939) as Saleslady (uncredited)
- Miracle at Lourdes (1939) as Nurse (uncredited)
- That Inferior Feeling (1940) as Bride (uncredited)
- Alfalfa's Double (1940) as Alfalfa's mother
- Pound Foolish (1940) as Mayor's Secretary (uncredited)
- The Domineering Male (1940) as Party Hostess (uncredited)
- All About Hash (1940) as Martha, Alfalfa's mother
- Bubbling Troubles (1940) as Alfalfa's Mom
- Women in Hiding (1940) as Miss Townsend, Head Nurse (uncredited)
- A Way in the Wilderness (1940) as Sick Farmer's Wife (uncredited)
- Soak the Old (1940) as Bogus Pension Office Employee (uncredited)
- Good Bad Boys (1940) as Alfalfa's Mother (uncredited)
- You, the People (1940) as Rooming House Diner (uncredited)
- American Spoken Here (1940) as Corset Buyer (uncredited)
- Respect the Law (1941) as Johnson's Maid (uncredited)
- 1-2-3 Go (1941) as Ann, nurse
- Coffins on Wheels (1941) as First Nurse at Desk (uncredited)
- Sucker List (1941) as Secretary (uncredited)
- Come Back, Miss Pipps (1941) as Angry Parent (uncredited)
- Wedding Worries (1941) as Miss Douglas (uncredited)
- Main Street on the March! (1941) as Nurse (uncredited)
- Don't Talk (1942) as Beauty Shop Customer (uncredited)
- The Lady or the Tiger? (1942) as Lady Behind Door in Arena (uncredited)
- Mr. Blabbermouth! (1942) as Woman (uncredited)
- Rover's Big Chance (1942) as Studio clerk
- Inflation (1942) as Woman in Close-Out Sale Montage (uncredited)
- Brief Interval (1943) as Nurse (uncredited)
- Benjamin Franklin, Jr. (1943) as Janet's mother
- Family Troubles (1943) as Mary Burston, Janet's mother
- Who's Superstitious? (1943) as Wife (uncredited)
- Seeing Hands (1943) as Ben's Mother (uncredited)
