= The Notorious Lady =

1927 film by King Baggot

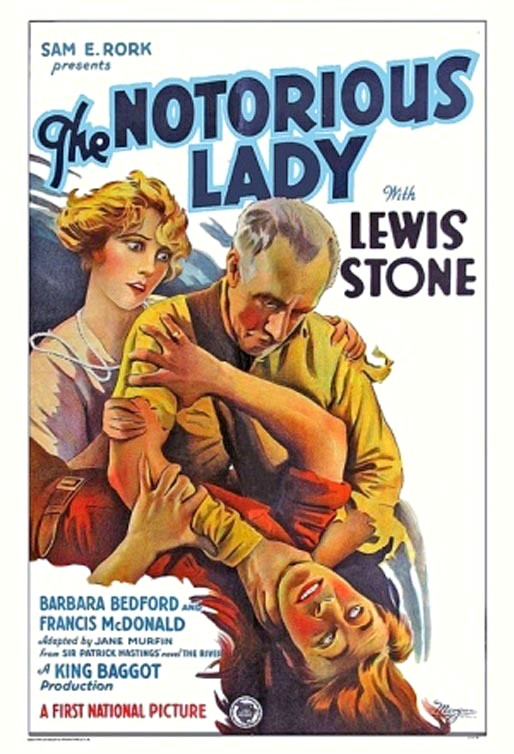
- Film poster
- Directed by: King Baggot
- Written by: Jane Murfin
- Based on: The River by Patrick Hastings
- Produced by: Sam E. Rork
- Starring: Barbara Bedford; Lewis Stone
- Cinematography: Tony Gaudio
- Edited by: Doris Farrington; Frank Lawrence
- Production company: Sam E. Rork Productions
- Distributed by: First National Pictures
- Release date: March 27, 1927
- Running time: 7 reels; 6,040 feet
- Country: United States
- Language: Silent (English intertitles)

The Notorious Lady is a 1927 American silent drama film produced by Sam E. Rork and distributed by First National Pictures. It was directed by veteran director King Baggot and starred Barbara Bedford and Lewis Stone.

The film was based on the 1925 play The River by British writer Patrick Hastings. Producer Rork's daughter, Ann Rork, has a leading role in the film.

== Cast ==
- Lewis Stone as Patrick Marlowe / John Carew
- Barbara Bedford as Mary Marlowe / Mary Brownlee
- Ann Rork as Kameela
- Earl Metcalfe as Anthony Walford
- Francis McDonald as Manuela Silvera
- Grace Carlyle as Marcia Rivers
- E. J. Ratcliffe as Doctor Digby Grant
- J. Gunnis Davis as William
- Lloyd Whitlock as Gilbert Patton
- Carl Stockdale as Defense Attorney (uncredited)
- Hannah Washington as Native Child (uncredited)

== Preservation ==
The film is preserved at the Library of Congress and is available on home video and DVD.
