= Rue de la Petite-Truanderie =

Rue de la Petite- Truanderie
- City
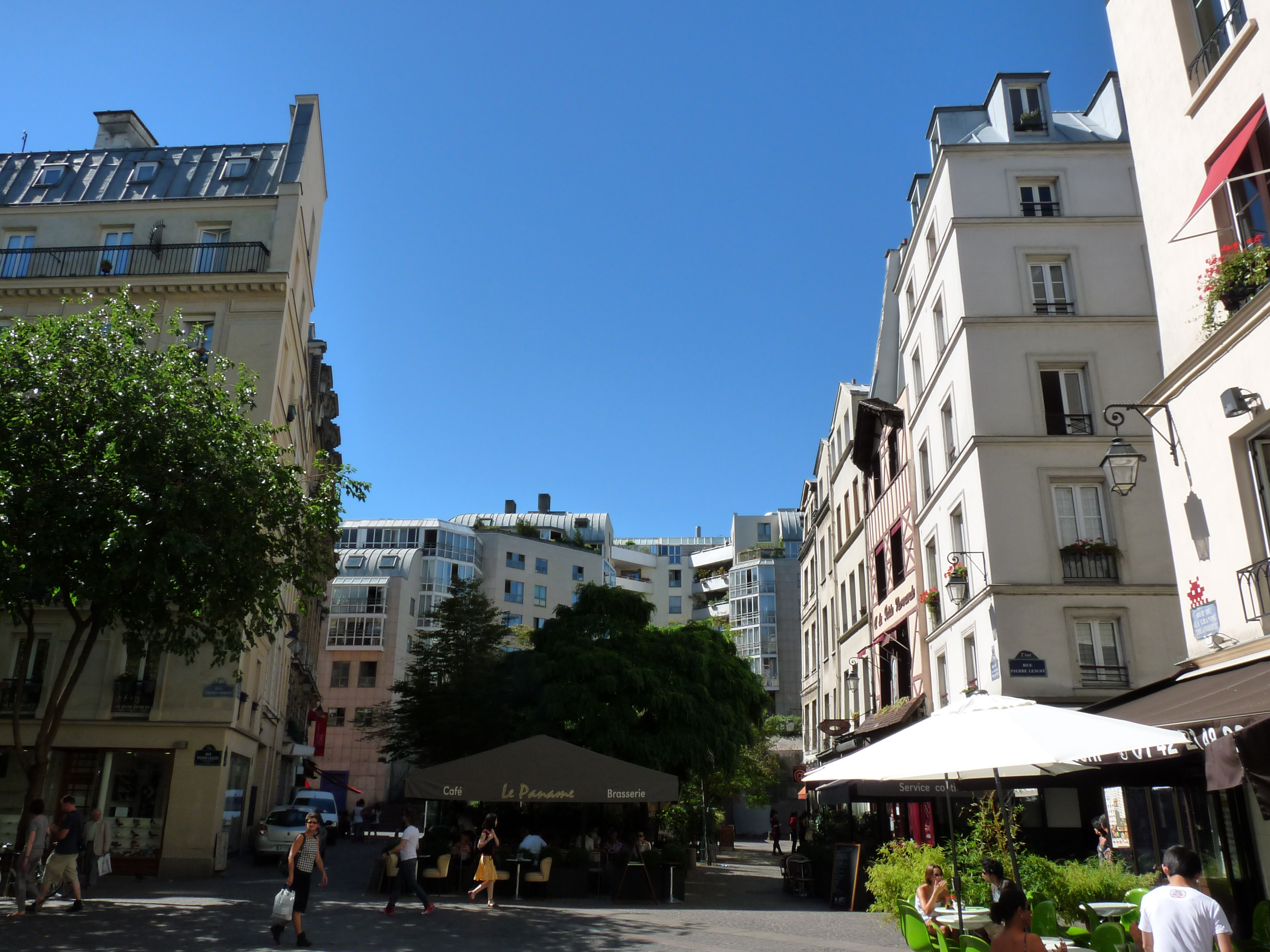
- Interactive map of Rue de la Petite- Truanderie

Area
  - Total: 88 km^{2} (34 sq mi)

Rue de la Petite-Truanderie (French pronunciation: [ʁy də la pətit tʁyɑ̃dʁi]) is an old path, in the 1st District of Paris, in France.

== Origin of name ==
The exact origin of the name is not known, but there are two thesis:

- The first, defended by Sauval and Cenalis who think the name Truanderie comes from the word ugly meaning in old language and popular term lazy, worthless, beggar . Those who maintain this aphorism say that in 1313 this street was called la Truanderie because it was at the northern end of Paris, along the walls of Philippe-Auguste because it was inhabited by rascals, fortune-tellers, and it was a real court of miracles.
- The second, defended by Jaillot who thought the name comes from truage, meaning taxes. Indeed, there were street from Great Truanderie, office or were perceived import duties on goods entering Paris.

== Location ==
In 1817, the Rue de la Petite-Truanderie, a length of 52 meters, began at number 16-18 rue Mondétour and finished at number 13-18 rue de la Grande-Truanderie. It was located in the former 5th district in the Montorgueil.

The numbers in the street were black one. The last odd number was 15 and the last even number was 16.

Currently, part of the 1st district Halles district, with a length of 34 meters, began at number 16 Mondetour Street and ends at number 11 Rue Pierre Lescot and Rue de la Grande Truanderie.

== History ==
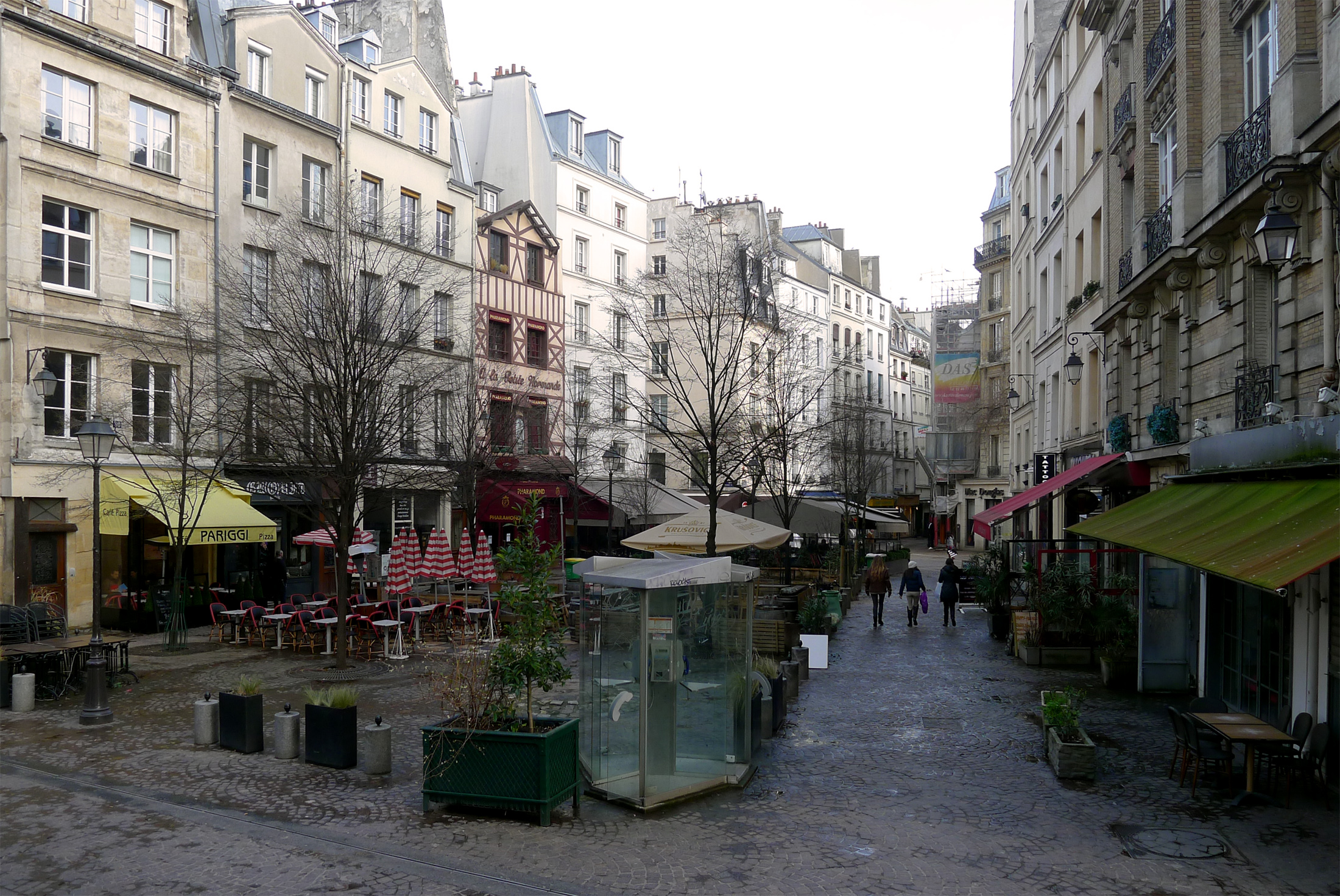
Place formed by the side of the even numbers of the Rue de la Grande-Truanderie (left) and the side of the odd numbers of Rue de la Petite-Truanderie (right).

The Rue de la Petite-Truanderie, like Rue de la Grande-Truanderie, was already built in 1250. Its location was formerly part of the small fief of Thérouenne, about half of which was ceded to Philippe-Auguste by Adam, archdeacon of Paris, then Bishop of Thérouenne.

Robert Cenalis, in his History of France, dedicated in 1555 to Henry II, named the Rue de la Petite-Truanderie Via Mendicatrix minor. She also wore the street names of Puits-d'Amour and Rue de l'Ariane .

It is quoted in Le Dit des Rues de Paris by Guillot de Paris under the name Rue de la Petite-Truanderie.

A ministerial decision of 28 Prairial year IX (17 June 1801), signed chaptal fixes that the least width of this public road be 10.5 meters.

At the junction of Pirouette, Mondetour, La Petite-Truanderie and Grande-Truanderie streets were the crossroads of the tower on which the Puits-d'Amour was located.

It forms the south side of a triangular square, the north side of which is formed by the Rue de la Grande-Truanderie and the west by Mondétour Street. Formerly, this square was occupied by buildings.

== Access ==
The street in Little Truanderie is served by the line at the metro station Les Halles, by the station Châtelet - Les Halles.
