= Rue du Cloître-Saint-Benoît =

Former street of Paris, France

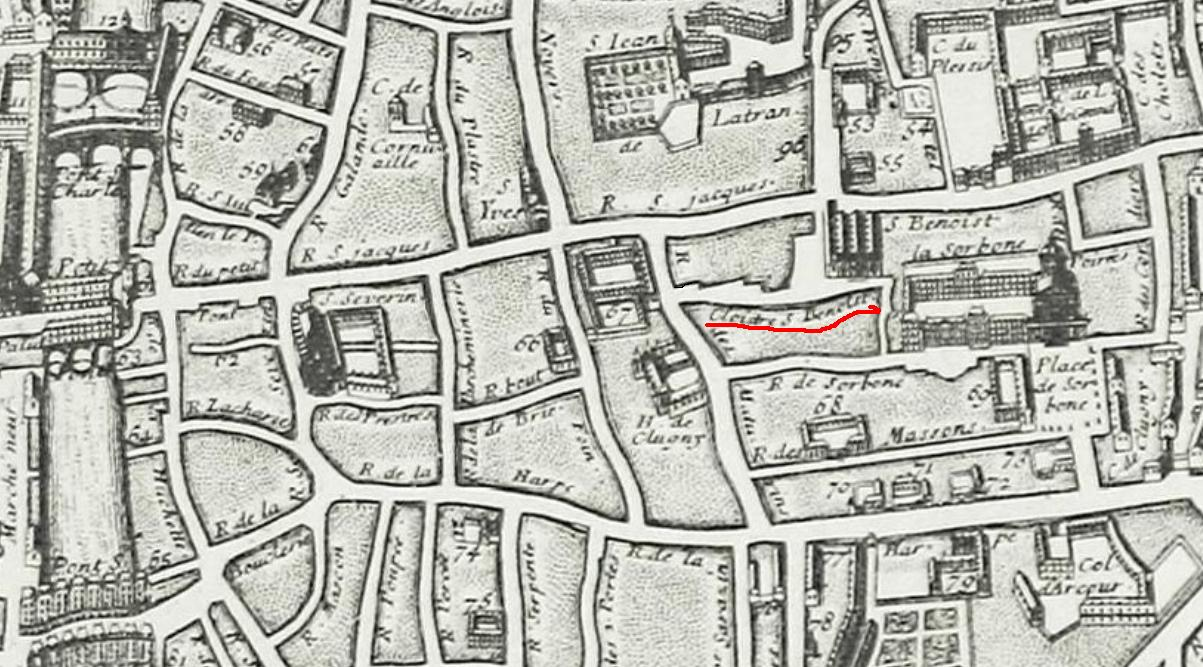
Partial plan by Jaillot (1713), showing the Rue du Cloitre-Saint-Benoit

The Rue du Cloître-Saint-Benoît (French pronunciation: [ʁy dy klwatʁ sɛ̃ bənwa]) was a now-disappeared street in the Sorbonne district of Paris, demolished to build the present Rue des Écoles. It was named after the cloister of the église Saint-Benoît-le-Bétourné, and just before the French Revolution, it fell within that church's parish. It was made part of the Chalier sector during the Revolution; that sector was renamed the Sorbonne district when the original 11th arrondissement of Paris was formed in 1795.

It began at the Rue des Mathurins-Saint-Jacques (now the Rue Du Sommerard) and ended at the Passage Saint-Benoît-Saint-Jacques. Its house numbers were black and the last numbers were 23 and 26.

== History ==
In a judicial act of 1243 it was known as the Rue André Machel after its owner. It was later renamed the Rue de l'Encloître Saint-Benoist then the Rue du Cloître Saint-Benoît since it served the église Saint-Benoît-le-Bétourné. Around 1280-1300, it was mentioned in Le Dit des rues de Paris by Guillot de Paris as en Cloistre Saint-Beneoit le bestourné.

A decree of 1855 prescribed the construction of the Rue des Écoles, including the demolition of the Rue du Cloître-Saint-Benoît. Around 1875, all that was left of the street was a junction between the Rue Du Sommerard and the Rue des Écoles, now totally disappeared. Nos. 1, 3, 5 and 7 on the Place Paul-Painlevé were built on the site of the north part of the street and the main auditorium of the Sorbonne occupies part of its south side.
