= Charles Monnet =

French painter and illustrator

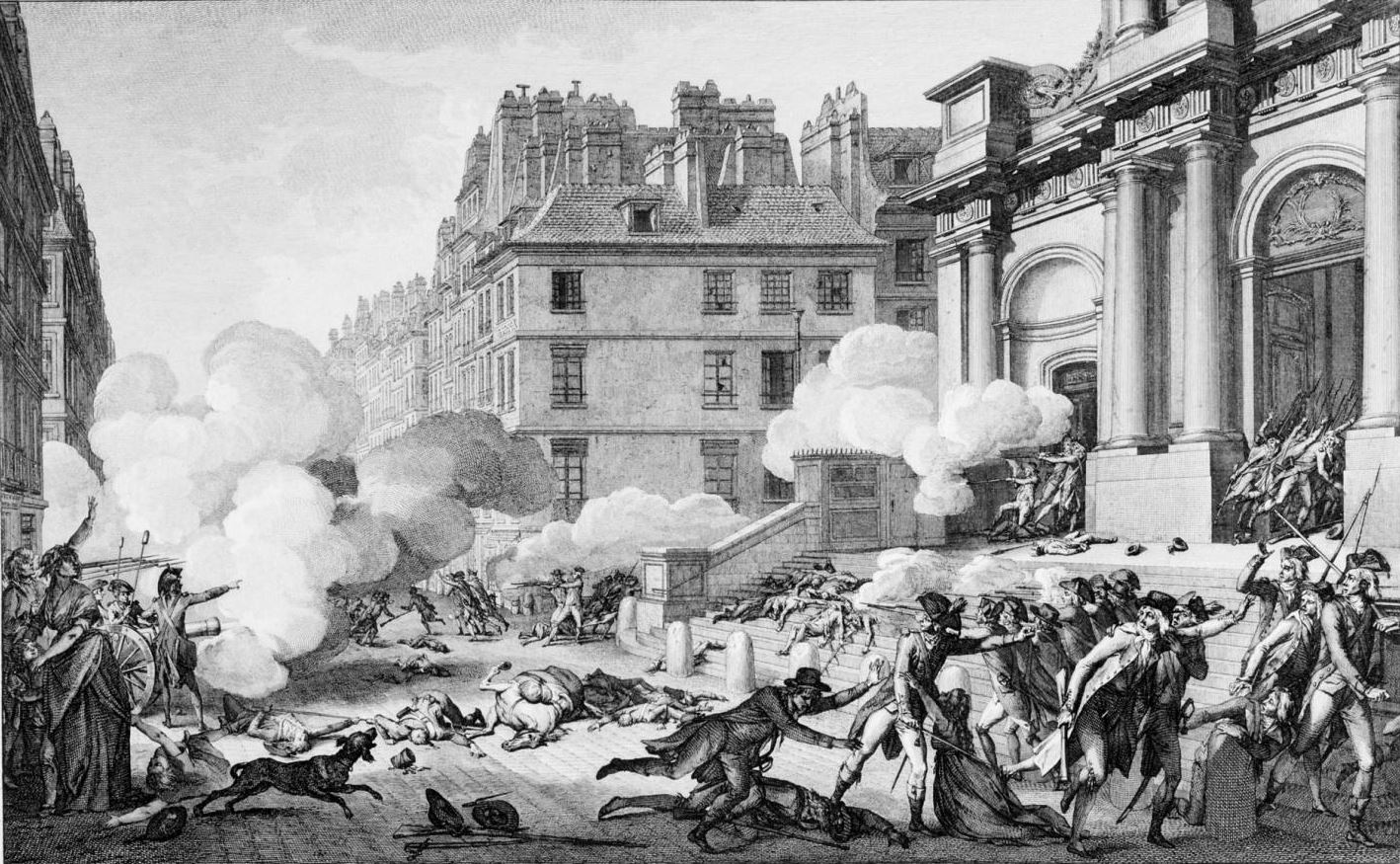
The Journée of 13 Vendémiaire, Year 4, The Saint Roch Church, Rue Saint-Honoré, Paris.

Charles Monnet, also known as Charles Monet (French: [ʃaʁl mɔnɛ]; 10 January 1732 – after 1808), was a French painter and illustrator, best known for his illustrations used in books, including illustrations of the French Revolution.

== Life ==
Born in Paris, he studied under Jean Restout the Younger. Although he never became a full academian, on July 27, 1765 he was made a provisional member of the Académie Royale, where he won first prize for the painting, Nabucliodonosor faisant crever les yeux à Sédicias et faisant massacrer ses enfants. His works in the mid 1760s and 1770s included portraits and religious and mythical scenes. He became "one of the best vignettists of his time" and well-known for his work as an illustrator, notably for an edition of Fables de La Fontaine published by Fessard.

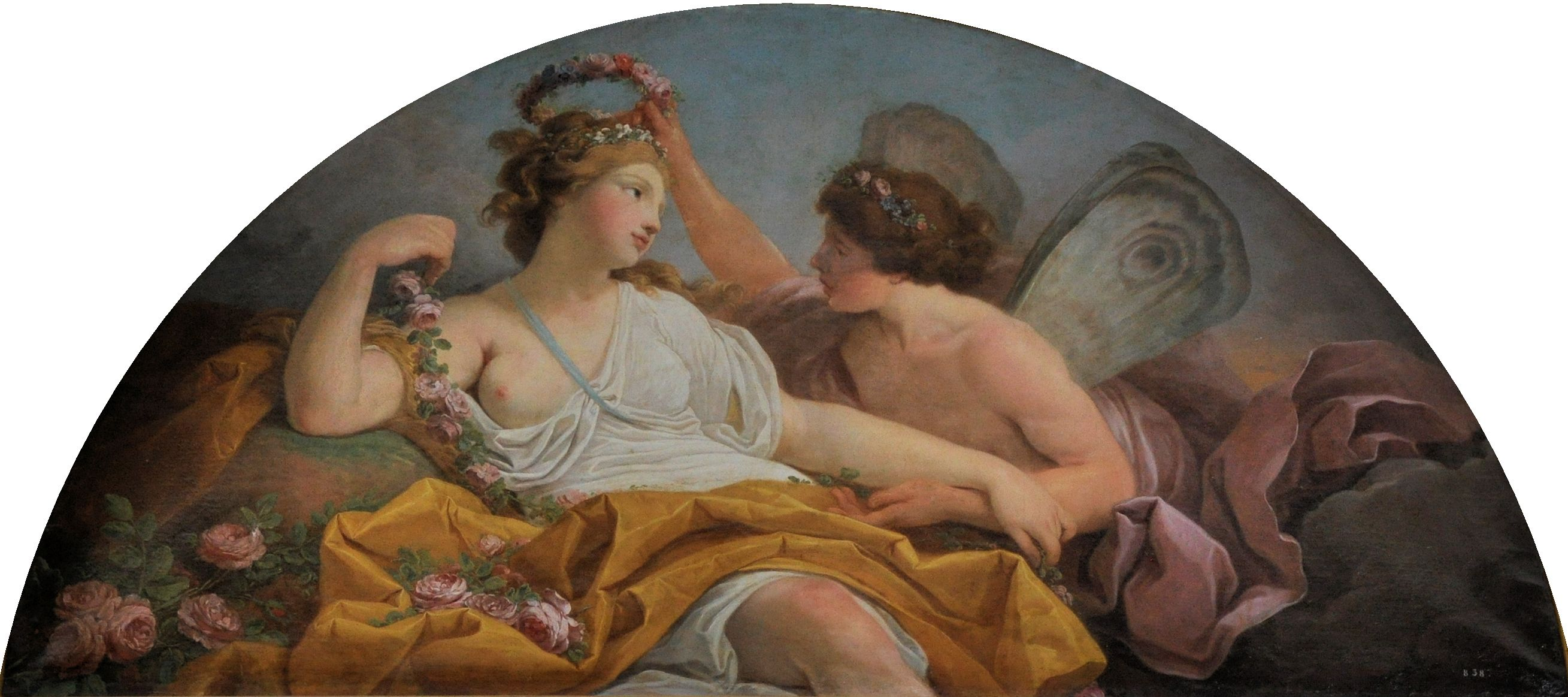
Zéphir and Flore, Petit Trianon at the Palace of Versailles

He completed two large compositions above the doors of the dining room in the Petit Trianon at the Palace of Versailles, Boreas and Orithyia and Zéphir and Flore, completed in 1768. His illustrations have been used for porcelain vases. Painted in polychrome enamels by highly skilled artisans using a method of garniture, several were purchased for Versailles by King Louis XVI in 1781.

Monnet made fifteen illustrations of the French Revolution, named Main Days of the Revolution, which were engraved by Isidore-Stanislas Helman and published in a volume in 1798. The illustrations were also turned into etchings by Antoinne-Jean Duclos and Jean Duplessis-Bertaux. Engravings were made of 153 of his illustrations for Abrege de l’Histoire universelle en figures, dessinees et gravees par les meilleurs artistes de la capitale, which was published in 1790. He also illustrated scenes from the history of the First French Empire and (with Jean-Michel Moreau, Clément-Pierre Marillier and Pietro Antonio Martini); Voltaire's Romans et contes of 1778; and Pierre Choderlos de Laclos's Les Liaisons dangereuses in its 1796 London edition.

He exhibited regularly at the Salon and ended his career as a drawing professor at the military École de Saint-Cyr. He died in Paris, where he was living in 1808.

His works are in the collections of the Smithsonian American Art Museum, Metropolitan Museum of Art, Bibliothèque Nationale, and Château de Malmaison.

== Gallery ==
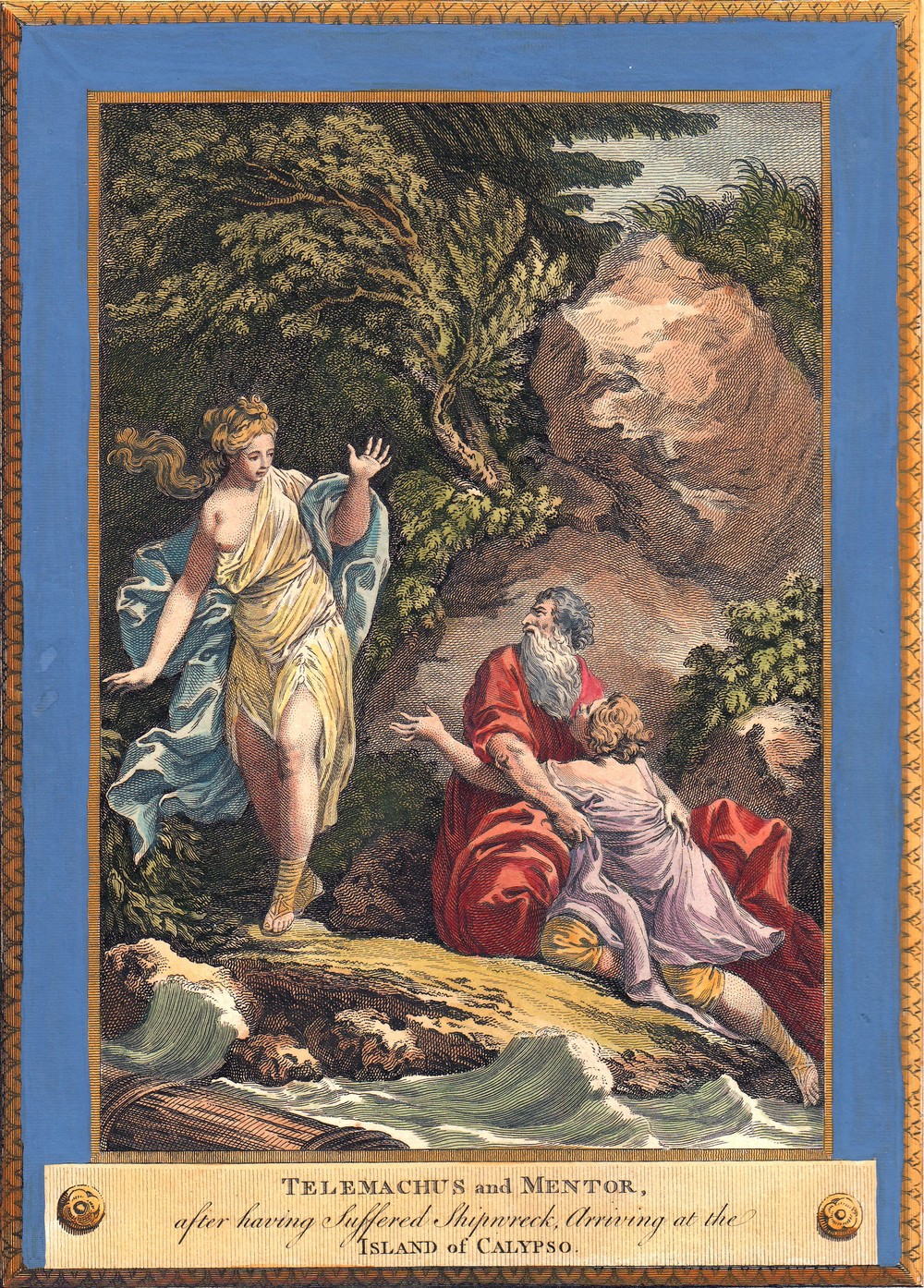
Monnet Telemachus and Mentor, 1774

Charles Eugéne, Prince de Lambesc in parade attire of Grand Écuyer de France, 1790

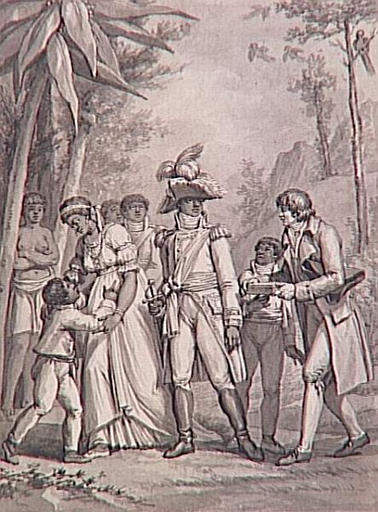
Toussaint Louverture Receiving a Letter from the First Consul, black ink and wash, 1802, Château de Malmaison. It is one of his 69 drawings illustrating the History of France under the Empire of Napoleon the Great.
