= Nicolas-Auguste Leisnier =

French engraver

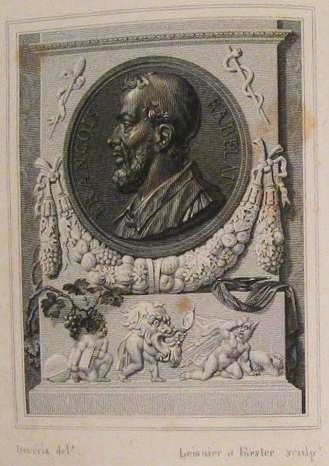
Bust of Rabelais by Leisnier, from an edition of Rabelais' complete works published in 1823.

Nicolas-Auguste Leisnier (1787-1858) was a French engraver specialising in burin.

== Life ==
Born in Paris, he was a pupil and apprentice of Charles Samuel Girardet and Louis Michel Halbou. He specialised in burin and worked in the midst of the print-shop quarter at 22 rue du Cloître-Saint-Benoît in a shop-studio as (by his own description) a "printer in etching" - the building was demolished in 1855. He was made a chevalier de la Légion d'honneur in 1834 and died at home at 32 rue de Trozy in Clamart in 1858.

== Engravings ==
- « Les Monuments de Paris », motifs for canvasses planned by Hippolyte Lebas and produced by Christophe-Philippe Oberkampf, Jouy-en-Josas, 1816-1818.
- Voyage dans le Levant en 1817 et 1818, by M. le Comte de Forbin, Paris, Imprimerie royale, 1819.
- Several plates for Description de l’Égypte, Paris, Panckoucke, 1821-1826 [2nd edition] - after drawings by Edme François Jomard and others.
- Series of engravings of vases commissioned by Frederick William III of Prussia, 1822
- « Rabelais » (collaboration with François Forster after Achille Devéria), Paris, Dalibon/Imprimerie de Jules Didot ainé, 1823.
- La Fornarina, after Raphael, 1846.
- Plates for « Monuments d'Orange » (Chalcographie du Louvre).
- Plates for Histoire des usages funèbres et des sépultures des peuples anciens by Ernest Feydeau, Paris, Gide et J. Baudry, 1856-1858.
