= Charles Dupuis =

Charles Dupuis may refer to:

- Charles-François Dupuis, French savant
- Charles Dupuis (engraver)

== See also ==
- Charles Dupuy, French prime minister
