= Guillaume Vallet =

French engraver (1632–1704)

- Adoration of the Child, engraved by Vallet after Raphael, Rijksmuseum, Amsterdam
- Born: 6 December 1632; Paris, Kingdom of France
- Died: 1 July 1704 (aged 71); Paris, Kingdom of France
- Resting place: Saint-Benoît-le-Bétourné
- Education: Pierre Daret; Carlo Maratta
- Occupation: Engraver
- Movement: Baroque

Guillaume Vallet (6 December 1632 – 1 July 1704) was a French Baroque engraver.

== Biography ==
Guillaume Vallet was born in Paris on 6 December 1632. He was the son of Jean Vallet, a print dealer (d. c. 1636), and Marguerite Liercourt. From an early age, he was friends with the engraver Étienne Picart. Vallet's initially trained under Pierre Daret. Subsequently, he and Picart studied under Carlo Maratta in Rome from 1655 to 1662. In Rome he created close ties with Italian and French artists residing in the city. With the assistance of Picard and Marcantonio Canini he completed the Iconografia, a collection of engravings of ancient medals, coins and jewellery by Giovanni Angelo Canini published posthumously in 1669.

Upon returning to Paris, Vallet became a member of the Académie royale de peinture et de sculpture in 1664 and first exhibited at the Salon of 1673. His reception piece was an engraving after Jean Jouvenet depicting Cardinal Mazarin. While Vallet sometimes created engravings based on his own designs, he also produced reproductions of works by Old Masters such as Francesco Albani, Sébastien Bourdon, Annibale and Ludovico Carracci, Guillaume Courtois, Carlo Maratta, Nicolas Poussin, Raphael, Guido Reni and Jacques Stella.

In the 1660s, Valled settled in the parish of Saint-Séverin. On 25 November 1664, he married Catherine Boivin, the daughter of the late merchant Claude Boivin, in the church of La Madeleine-en-la-Cité. The couple had five children, including the engraver Jérôme Vallet (1667–1720), who studied under his father and become a member of the Académie royale de peinture et de sculpture on 26 August 1702. Vallet died on 1 July 1704, aged 71, and was buried in Saint-Benoît-le-Bétourné. Gaspard Duchange was one of his pupils.

== Gallery ==
The Virgin the infant Christ ans young Saint John the Baptist, engraved by Guillaume Vallet, after Guido Reni, Metropolitan Museum of Art, New York

The Virgin in Prayer, engraved by Guillaume Vallet, after Guido Reni, Metropolitan Museum of Art, New York

The Virgin, Child Jesus, and two Angels, engraved by Guillaume Vallet, after Andrea Camassei, Rijksmuseum, Amsterdam

Frontispiece of Giovanni Baptista Ferrari's Fasti Senenses, engraved by Vallet after Carlo Maratta, 1661, Rijksmuseum, Amsterdam

== Bibliographie ==
- Jal, Augustin (1872). "Vallet (Guillaume) 1633-1704, (Hiérôme) 1667- ? , (Jean-Emmanuel-Jérôme) 1722-- ?". Dictionnaire critique de biographie et d'histoire: errata et supplément pour tous les dictionnaires historiques d'après des documents authentiques inédits (2nd ed.). Paris: Henri Plon. pp. 1221–1222.
- Meyer, Véronique (2003). "Duchange, Gaspard". Grove Art Online. Oxford: Oxford University Press. doi:10.1093/gao/9781884446054.article.T023910.
- "Vallet, Guillaume". Benezit Dictionary of Artists. Oxford: Oxford University Press. 2011. doi:10.1093/benz/9780199773787.article.B00002882.
- "Vallet, Jérôme". Benezit Dictionary of Artists. Oxford: Oxford University Press. 2011. doi:10.1093/benz/9780199773787.article.B00002882.
