= Antoine Petit =

French physician, 1709–1781

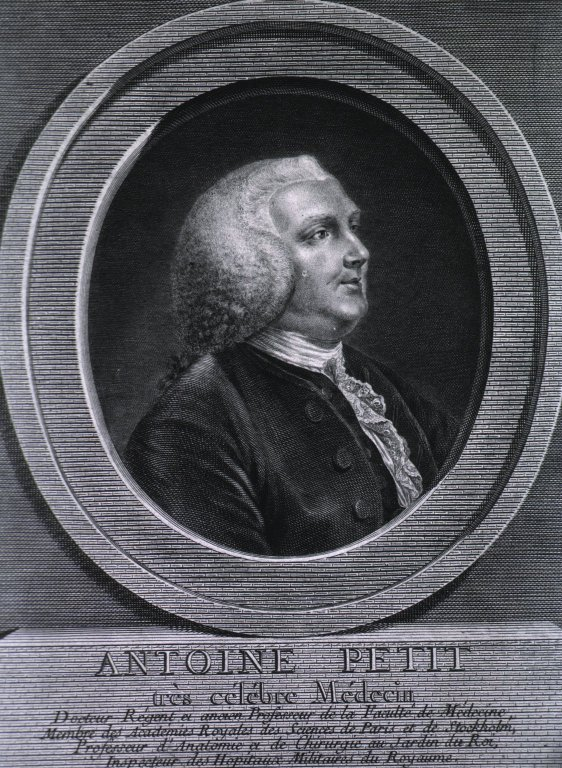
- Antoine Petit drawn and engraved by Charles-François-Adrien Macret in 1775
- Born: 23 July 1722; Orléans (France)
- Died: 21 October 1794 (aged 72); Olivet (France)
- Citizenship: France
- Education: University of Paris
- Known for: several articles for the Diderot and d'Alembert Encyclopédie
- Scientific career
- Fields: Anatomy, surgery and childbirth
- Workplaces: Jardin du Roi, University of Paris
- Thesis: (1746)

Antoine Petit (French: [ɑ̃twan pəti]; 23 July 1722 – 21 October 1794) was a French physician, master of Joseph-Ignace Guillotin and Félix Vicq d'Azyr.

== Biography ==
Antoine Petit, born in Orléans, was the son of a tailor. He received a disciplined education and, after studying at the Orléans college, he took up the study of medicine at the University of Paris where he received his doctorate in 1746.

Soon he became a teacher and lecturer in anatomy, surgery and childbirth.

The accuracy of his diagnosis resulted in Petit being widely recognized in many parts of Europe.

He was appointed anatomy professor at Jardin du Roi from 1769 to 1778. In the University of Paris, he founded a chair of anatomy then a chair of surgery. The professors, engaged and appointed by the university, had to teach for ten years then made way for younger. He was a member of French Academy of Sciences and wrote several articles for the Diderot and d'Alembert Encyclopédie.

Antoine Petit amassed a significant wealth then, because he had no child, spent a part to found places that accord medical treatment. He spent more than 100,000 French livres to Orléans city: he appointed four physicians and two surgeons for free health care for sick people and those in every kind of need, in a house he built in this purpose. On market days, they took care of those from the country.

In the same way, he appointed two lawyers and a prosecutor who involved towards the poor.

In Fontenay-aux-Roses, he donated a building to house the municipality medical officer.

He died in Olivet, on 1794.

== Bibliography ==
- Jan Palfijn (1753). Anatomie chirurgicale de Palfin, revue et augmentée par A. Petit. chez la veuve Cavelier. pp. 599–. Paris. 2 vol. in-12
- Antoine Petit (1757). Discours sur l'utilité de la chirurgie. Paris. in-4°
- Antoine Petit (1765). Projet de réforme sur l'exercice de la médecine en France. Paris. in-4°
- Antoine Petit (1765). Consultation en faveur de la légitimité des naissances tardives. Paris. in-8°
- Antoine Petit (1766). Recueil des pièces relatives a la question des naissances tardives. chez D'Houry. 2 vol. in-8°
- Antoine Petit (1766). Premier rapport en faveur de l'inoculation. chez Dessain junior. Paris. in-8°
- Antoine Petit (1767). Lettre de M. A. Petit à M. le Doyen de la Faculté de Médecine sur quelques faits relatifs à la pratique de l'inoculation. chez Vallat-la-Chapelle. Paris. in-8°
- Antoine Petit (1798). Traité des maladies des femmes enceintes, des femmes en couche et des enfants nouveaux-nés. pp. 237–. Paris. 2 vol. in-8°

== Notes ==
- A street bears his name in Fontenay-aux-Roses.
