= Nicolas-Gabriel Dupuis =

French engraver

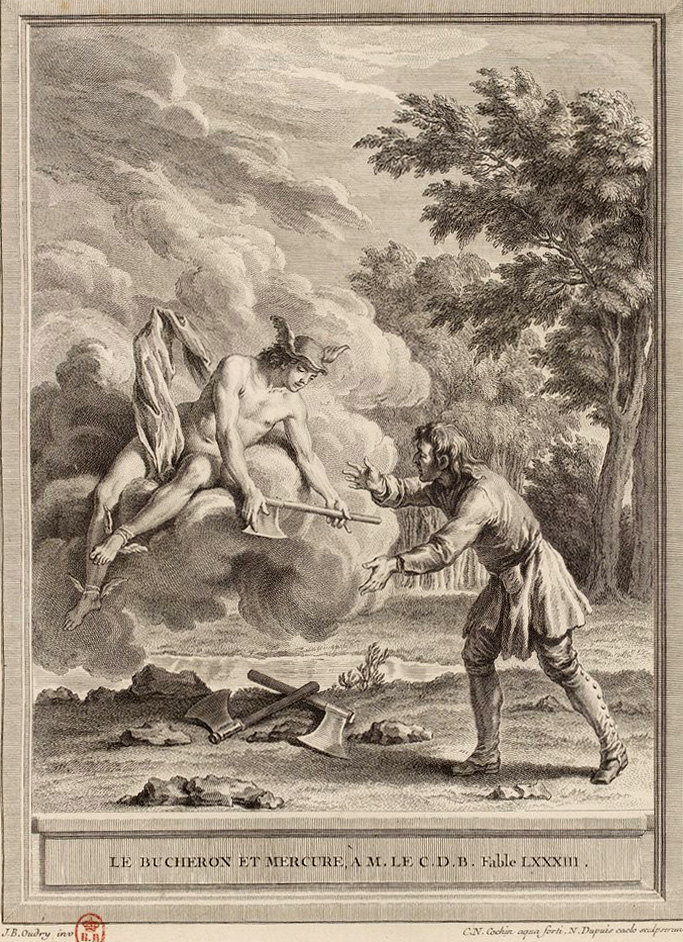
The Lumberjack and Mercury; from La Fontaine's Fables

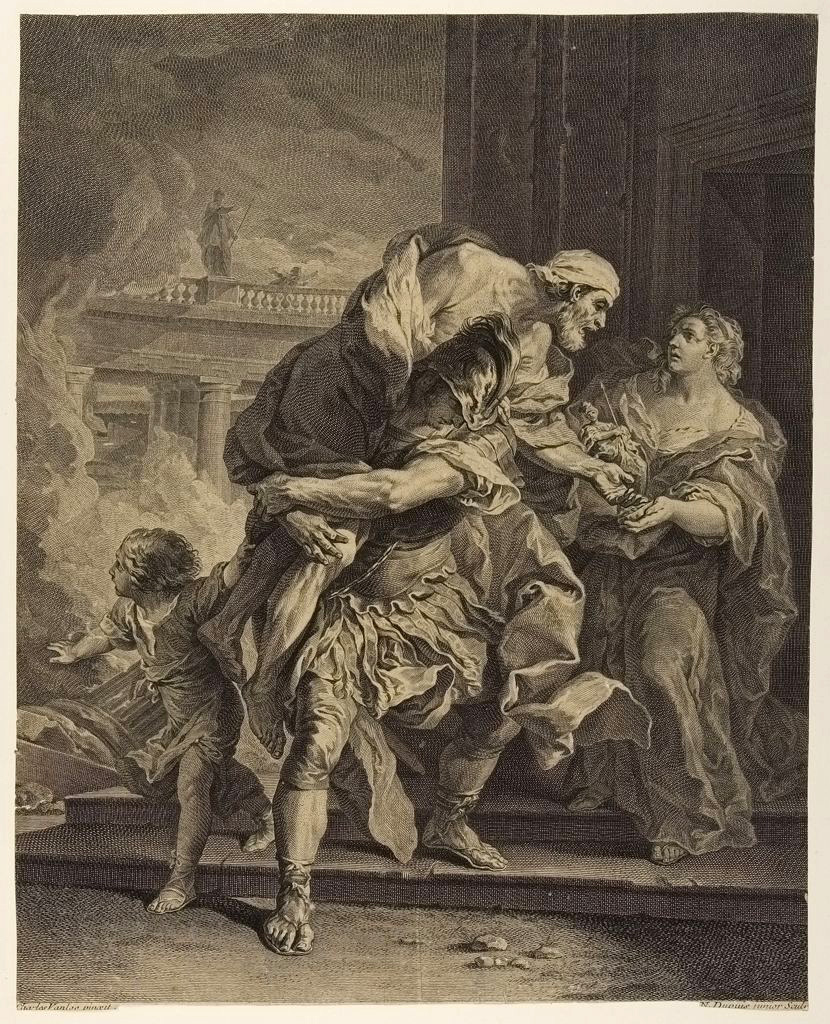
Aeneas Saving her Father from the Burning of Troy

Nicolas-Gabriel Dupuis (1698, Paris – 26 March 1771, Paris) was a French engraver. He sometimes signed his name as "Dupuis le Jeune" or "Dupuis Junior", to distinguish himself from his older brother, Charles Dupuis, who was also an engraver.

== Biography ==
He and his brother both received their training from Gaspard Duchange, who offered him his daughter in marriage. He perfected his skills in England, where the Rococo style was in fashion and French artists were in great demand.

In 1751, he was given the approval of the Académie royale de peinture et de sculpture and became a member three years later.

He took numerous students; notably Louis Michel Halbou and Charles-François-Adrien Macret, as well as the Spaniards, Manuel Salvador Carmona and Pasqual Pere Moles.

Among his notable illustrations are those created for the complete edition of the Fables of Jean de La Fontaine, published by Saillant et Desaint (1755-1759), after drawings by Jean-Baptiste Oudry and others.

== Selected works ==
- La Henriade by Voltaire, frontispiece to the sixth song, after Jean-François de Troy
- Aeneas Saving her Father from the Burning of Troy, after Charles André van Loo
- The Adoration of the Kings, after Paolo Veronese
- The Virgin and Child Jesus, after Annibale Carracci
