= Jacqueline Getty Phillips =

American socialite and racehorse breeder (1931–1992)

- Racing silks of Jacqueline Getty Phillips
- Born: Jacqueline Marie Manewal; May 9, 1931; St. Louis, Missouri, U.S.
- Died: January 21, 1992 (aged 60); Bedford, New York, U.S.
- Known for: American socialite, art collector, throughbred owner and breeder
- Spouse(s): Michael Riordan; George F. Getty II; Ivan Phillips
- Children: 3
- Relatives: Richard Riordan (brother-in-law); J. Paul Getty (father-in-law)
- Family: Getty family

Jacqueline Marie Manewal Riordan Getty Phillips (May 9, 1931 – January 21, 1992) was an American socialite and racehorse owner. She was known for her high profile marriages to Michael Robert Riordan and George F. Getty II, which both ended in their deaths. Beginning in the 1970s, Getty Phillips became internationally successful in horse racing and breeding. Her horses would go on to earn more than $1,000,000 in race winnings over her career as a thoroughbred owner.

== Biography ==
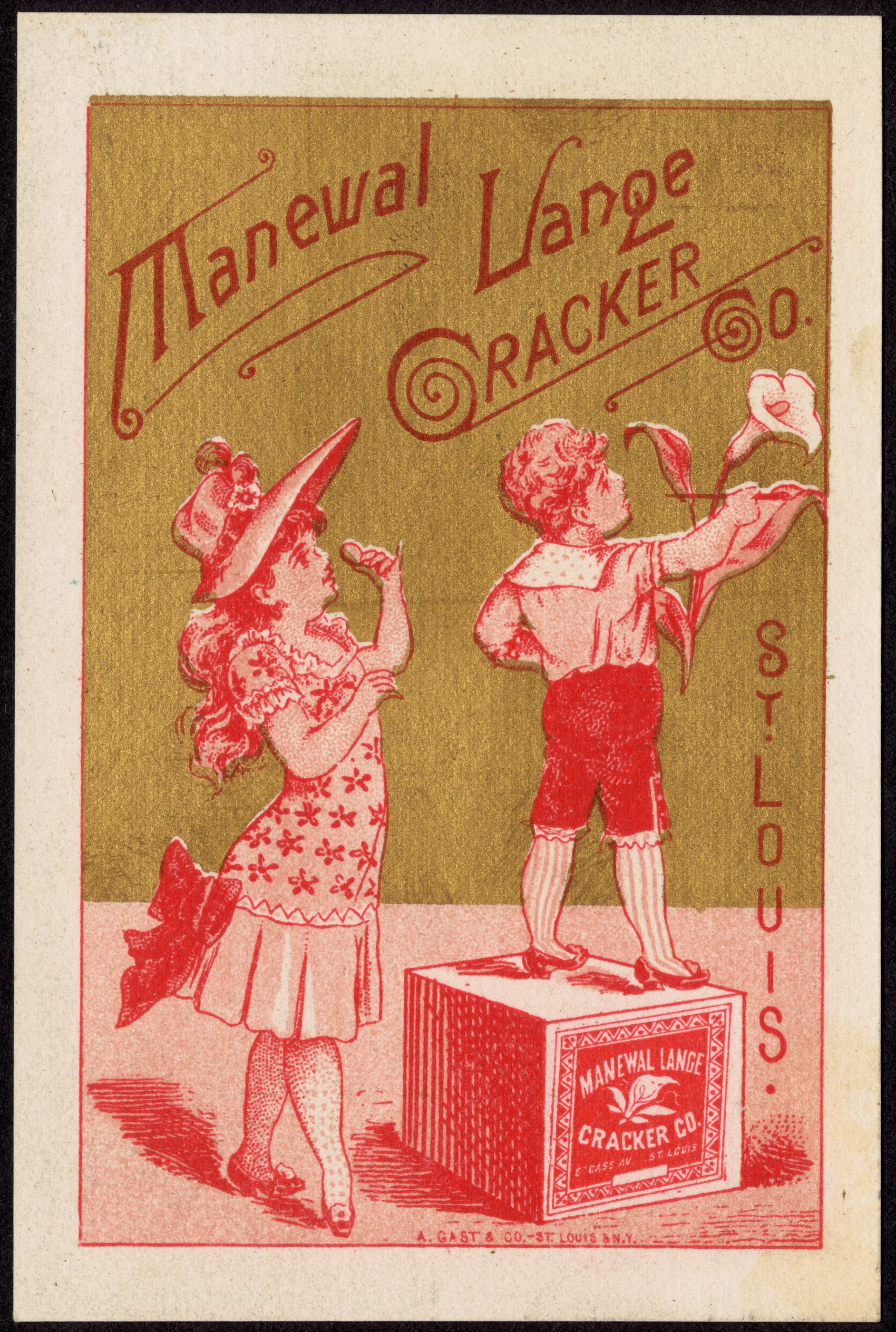
Advertisement for the Manewal Lange Cracker Company, it would later become the Manewal Baking & Bread Corporation. The company filed for bankruptcy in 1939.

Jacqueline Marie Manewal was born in 1931 in St. Louis, Missouri. Her father Wilton Louis Manewal was an executive for the Manewal Baking & Bread Corporation and later was an insurance agent. As an adult, Jacqueline Manewal claimed she was named after Jacqueline Busch, of the Anheuser-Busch brewery family who were close family friends. As a child, she grew up riding horses at Chesterfield, her family's horse farm outside of St. Louis.

Mannewal graduated from the Villa Duchesne Convent of the Sacred Heart in Clayton, Missouri. She then attended Georgetown Visitation Junior College in Washington, D.C., where she had her coming out as a debutante.

=== Mrs. Michael Robert Riordan ===
In September 1950, her engagement to Michael Robert Riordan was covered by the New York Times. Michael Riordan was the son of William O. Riordan, a self-made executive who became the president of Stern's. The couple moved to California where they became involved in the community and had several children together. Jacqueline Riordan became the provisional chairman for Juniors of the Social Service Auxiliary. In 1960, Jackie Riordan's husband Michael co-founded Equity Funding Corporation of America, a financial conglomerate and life insurance broker.

In January 1969, Southern California experienced severe rainfall and flooding, which would kill 92 people. Jaqueline's husband Michael Riordan was killed when a landslide collapsed the bedroom of the couple's home in Mandeville Canyon. Jaqueline Riordan and their three children were in another part of the house at the time. Six firemen were trapped when they came to his rescue. Riordan was 41 years old. After Riordan's death, it was discovered his company Equity Funding Corporation of America was a fraud. Jacqueline Riordan and her children inherited the bulk of her husband's estate, at the time appraised at $26.2 million.

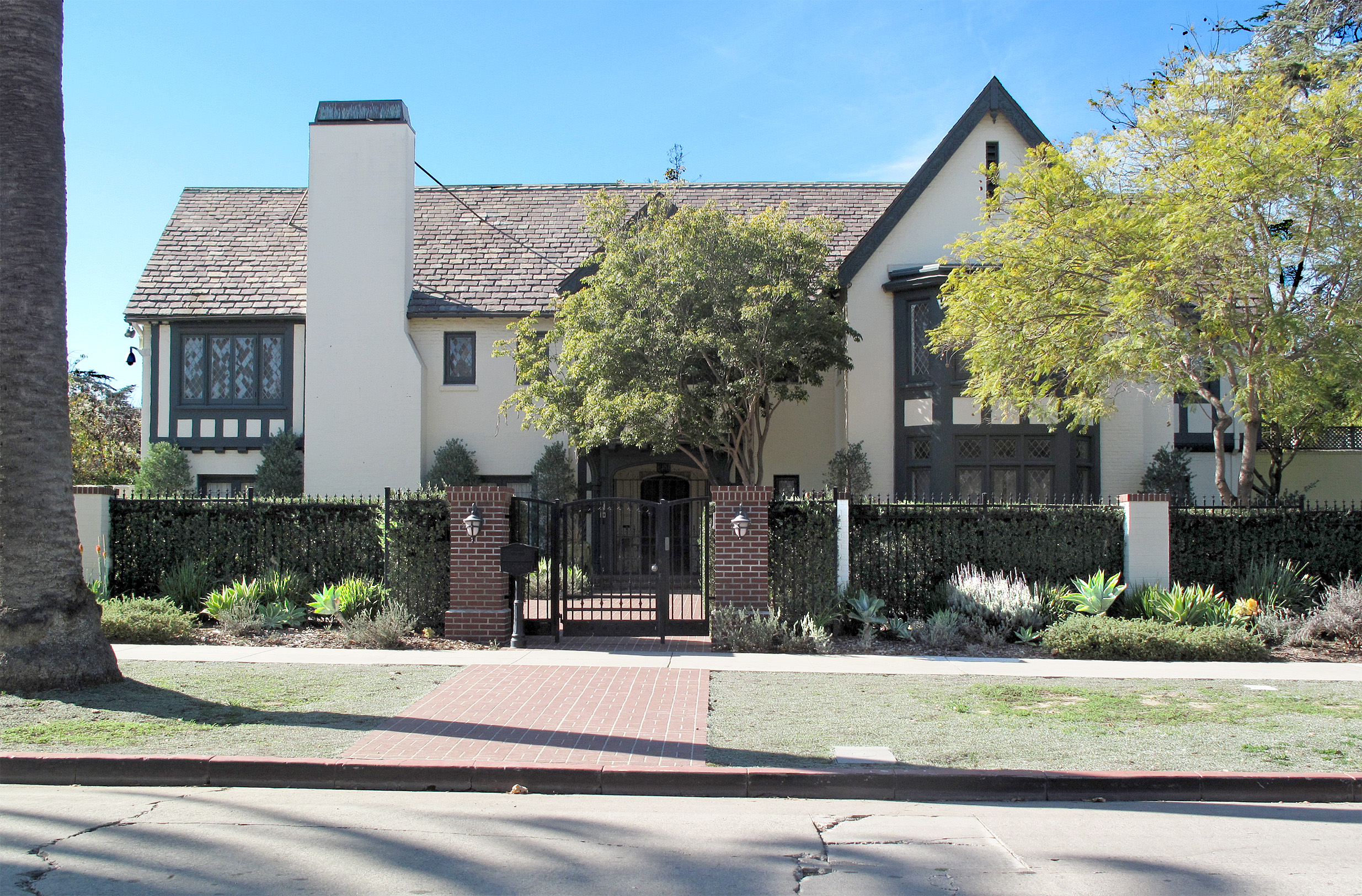
The Getty House in Los Angeles.

=== Mrs. George F. Getty II ===
In September 1970, Ms. Jackie Riordan was announced as the fiancée of George F. Getty II, the eldest son of J. Paul Getty, who made his fortune developing Getty Oil. At the time, J. Paul Getty was popularly known as the richest man in the world. The pair met on a blind date. The couple married in 1971.

George F. Getty was an executive at Getty Oil and the couple resided at her 15 room French chateau in Bel-Air and at the grand Getty House in the Windsor Square neighborhood of Los Angeles. On June 6, 1973 George F. Getty died unexpectedly and under unclear circumstances. George F. Getty's death was initially reported as a cerebral hemorrhage. At the time, Jaqueline Getty said George F. Getty II fell and hit his head on concrete during a barbeque near the pool while carrying a knife, stabbing himself accidentally. Despite Jacqueline's claims, an autopsy found no signs of head trauma, but bruising and barbiturates in his system.

The findings, as well as Getty's social standing brought his death under wide suspicion. The L.A. County coroner ruled his death as a probable suicide. According to author John Pearson who would write a book on the Getty family, that night, George F. and Jacqueline Getty had and argument over his father. George F. locked himself in a room at Getty House, where he consumed alcohol and attempted to stab himself with a barbeque fork. George F. Getty later fell into a coma and died.

Jacqueline Getty received three-eighths of George F. Getty II's estate after his death. After his death, Getty House was sold and later donated to the city of Los Angeles where it became the official residence of the Mayor of Los Angeles. As a second-time widow, Jaqueline Getty turned her attention to developing a writing career and furthering her work in the thoroughbred industry.

=== Horse racing ===
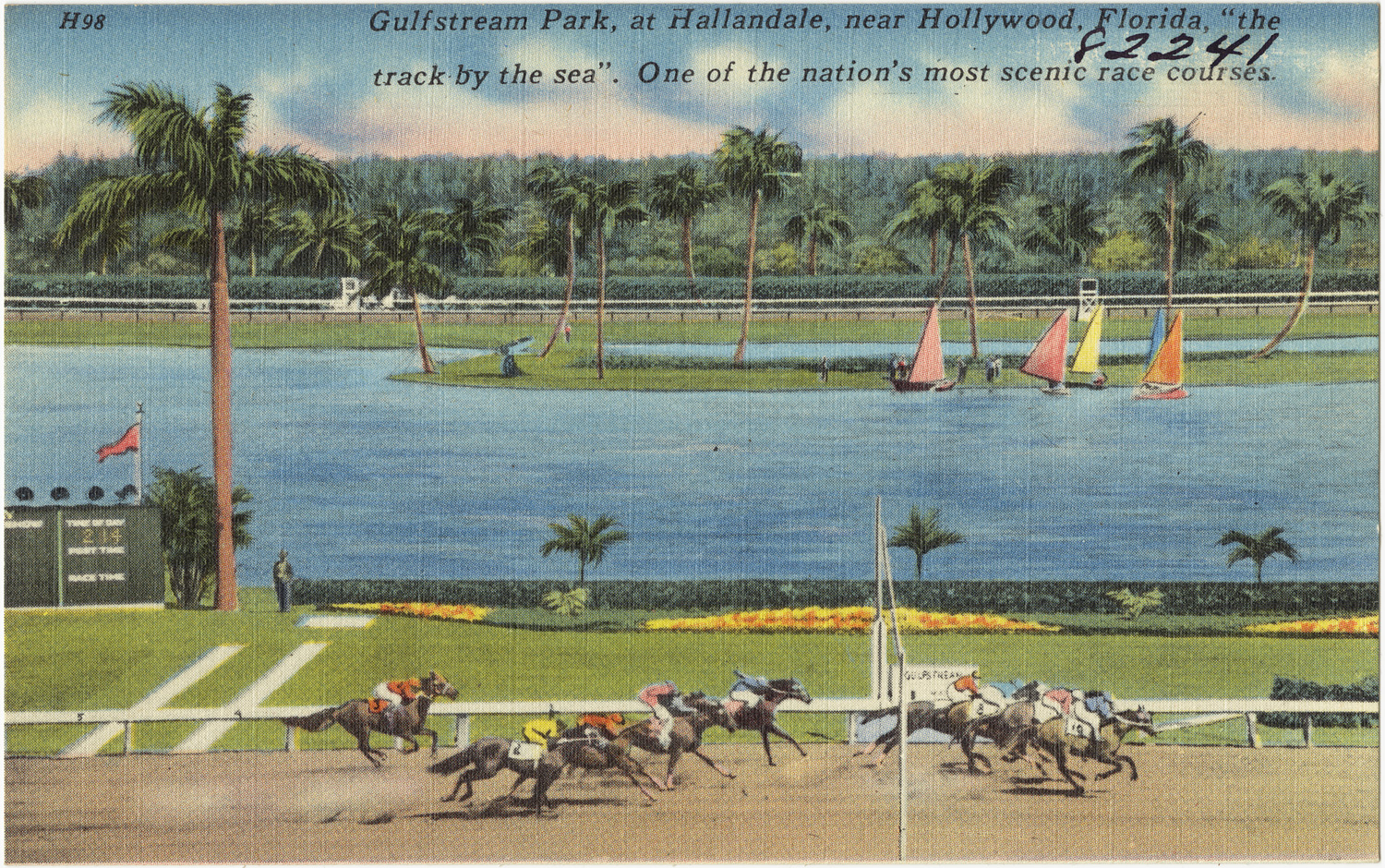
The Gulfstream Park racecourse, where Getty Phillips's horse Lord Darnely won the Gulfstream Park Mile Stakes.

Jacqueline Getty became involved in breeding and racing horses soon after she met her second husband George F. Getty, who was an avid racehorse owner and breeder. In 1970 she bought a filly, Sunday Purchase, who would become a foundation mare for her breeding efforts. Her son Michael would also become heavily involved in his mother's racing efforts, and become a keen horseman in his own right. After her husband's death, Getty used the money from dispersing her husband's horses into developing her own horse breeding operation.

Getty kept horses in training in the United States, Europe and Australia. Her jockeys were outfitted in distinctive yellow racing silks with white dots. She would regularly travel across the globe to see her horses race. Some of her biggest racing successes came in Europe. In 1976 her horse Meneval went undefeated winning the Ballysax Stakes, Nijinsky Stakes, the Gallinule Stakes and then recording his biggest victory in the Irish St. Leger. The next year, her horse Artaius would win the 1977 Classic Trial Stakes, Eclipse Stakes and Sussex Stakes. By 1977, Getty owned 36 horses and four broodmares. That year, Properantes, co-owned by Jaqueline Getty and her son, won the $150,000 San Juan Capistrano Handicap, and earn more than $260,000 during his racing career.

In 1980, Getty and her son bred Bates Motel, who would go on to become one of her most successful horses. Getty and her son Michael originally shipped Bates Motel to England to sell, but when he did not break his reserve price, they returned him to the United States and put him to work with a newly established trainer, John Gosden. Bates Motel would earn more than $850,000 in a distinguished career, and catapult his trainer Gosden into international fame. In 1982, her horse Lord Darnley won the Widener Handicap and the Gulfstream Park Mile Stakes with apprentice jockey Mary L. Russ up. The victory marked the first time a female jockey won a Grade 1 race. Lord Darnley would go on to win more than $484,000 over his racing career. In 1983, Bates Motel would win an Eclipse Award and be named American Champion Older Male Horse.

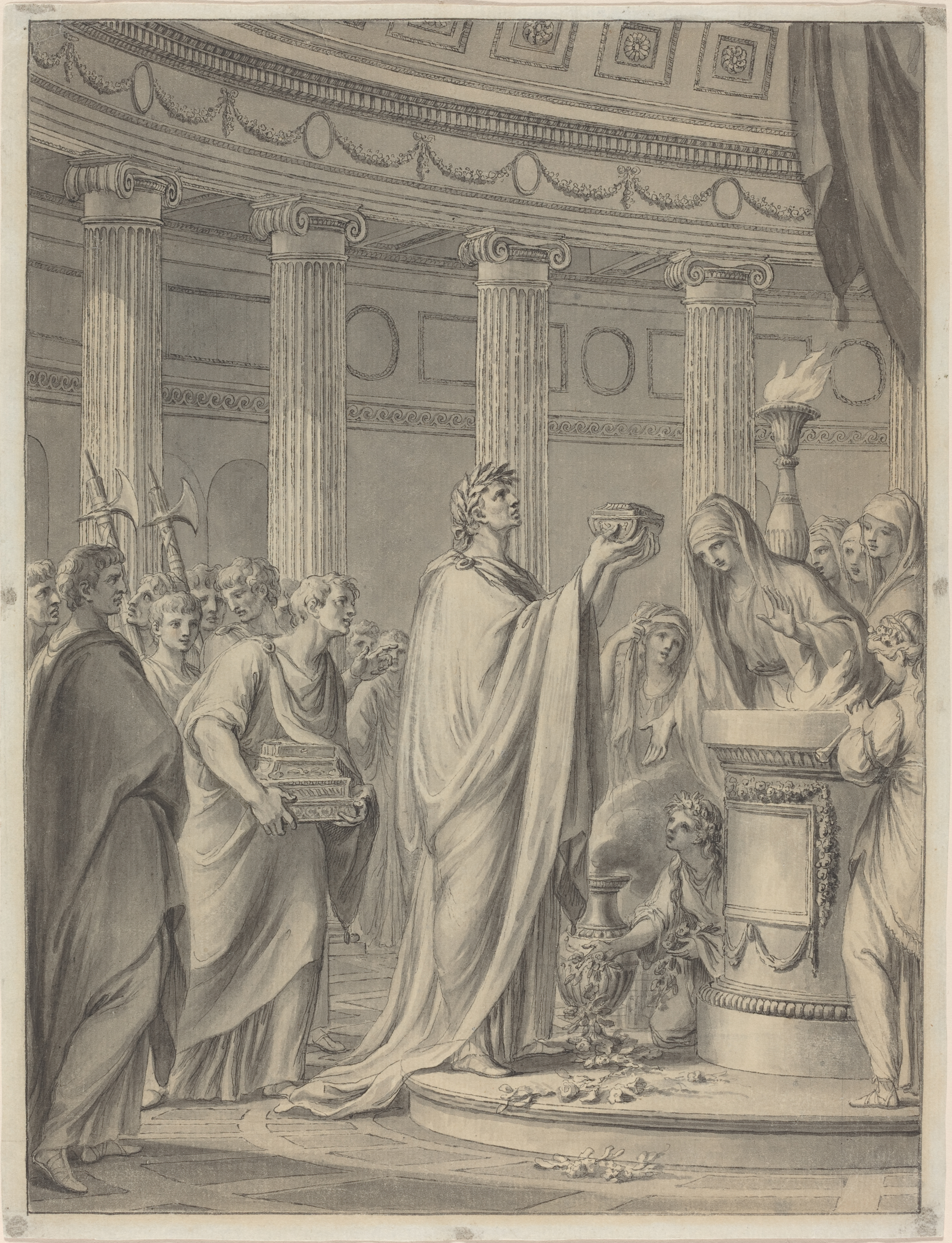
Clément-Pierre Marillier, An Ancient Sacrifice, c. 1800.

=== Mrs. Ivan Phillips ===
Jacqueline Getty married for the third time in 1981 to Ivan Phillips, a Canadian lawyer and avid art collector.

On January 21, 1992 Jacqueline Getty Phillips died in Bedford, New York at age 60. After her death, Ivan Phillips donated a number of artworks to the National Gallery of Art in her memory, including An Ancient Sacrifice by Clément-Pierre Marillier and Pallas Athene in the Form of a Bird Leaving Nestor and Telemachus by Jean-Jacques-François Le Barbier. She was buried in Holy Cross Cemetery in Culver City.

After her death, her estate was auctioned at Christies in New York on May 26, 1993.

== In media ==
Canadian actress Lynda Boyd played Jacqueline Getty in the drama series Trust.
