= Giovanni Angelo Canini =

Italian painter and engraver (1609–1666)

- Giovanni Antonio Grecolini, Portrait of Giovanni Angelo Canini, Nationalmuseum, Stockholm
- Born: 1609; Rome
- Died: 1666 (aged 56–57); Rome
- Education: Domenichino
- Known for: Painting and Engraving
- Movement: Baroque

Giovanni Angelo Canini, also known as Giovanni Agnolo or Giannangiolo (1609 – 1666), was an Italian painter and engraver of the Baroque period.

== Biography ==
Giovanni Angelo Canini was born at Rome, one of three brothers, sons of a stonemason named Vincenzo, all of whom became artists. The elder brother was a painter; while the younger brother, Marcantonio, a sculptor. He was first the pupil of Domenichino as a child, and traveled with him to Naples. There he worked with Antonio Barbalonga. In 1634, at the request of Domenichino, he was commissioned to restore the oil paintings, which had been painted by Passignano on the walls of the chapel of St Sebastian in the Villa Aldobrandini in Frascati.

He painted two altarpieces: the Martyrdom of St Stephen and of Saints Bartholomew and Nicola with the Trinity (July 1644) for the church of San Martino ai Monti in Rome that belonged to the Oratorians of St Filippo Neri. In 1645 signing in the Castello Theodoli in Sambuci near Tivoli, he also painted frescoes for the brother of Cardinal Camillo Astalli, depicting the Stories of Rinaldo and Armida, mythological scenes and figures in chiaroscuro, with frescoed landscapes and fake architecture of colonnades.

He was known to various sources for Roman art, including Bellori and Passeri. He worked under Pietro da Cortona and with Cesi in the decoration of the gallery of Pope Alexander VII in the Palazzo Quirinale (1656–1657). He was received into the Accademia di San Luca of Rome in 1650, and was eventually patronized by Queen Christina of Sweden. Though talented as an artist, he devoted much time to archaeology, and published two works on that subject. He also painted two canvases, a Conversion of St. Paul and a Resurrected Christ before Apostles, for the chapel of signor Vincenzo Baccelli in San Giovanni dei Fiorentini.

In 1657, Pier Francesco Mola asked Canini and Cozza to help in the decoration of the Palazzo Panfili in Valmontone. in 1659, he also painted two frescoes painted for the church of San Marco in Rome: Abdon and Sennen refuse to worship the Pagan Gods, and Mark approves the project for the construction of the church. Cardinal Astalli was instrumental for Canini in this commission. In this same period he painted the Dispute of St Catherine for the Cesi chapel in Santa Maria Maggiore.

Having accompanied Cardinal Flavio Chigi to France, he was encouraged by the minister Colbert to execute designs from medals, antique gems and similar sources a series of portraits of the most illustrious characters of antiquity, accompanied with memoirs. In France he had engraved a portrait of Cardinal Mazzarino.

In Rome he continued to work for the Chigi in 1665, painting in his palace at Santi Apostoli. In 1666, he painted a small gouache scenes with the Miracles of Francis de Sales for the church of Villa Versaglia at Formello. Later in life, Canini devoted himself almost exclusively to his scholarly and antiquarian interests. He died from a febrile illness in 1666, before completing the antiquarian work he had been working on. The work was completed by his brother Marcantonio with the assistance of Jean Picard and Guillaume Vallet. It was published it in 1669, under the title of Iconografia di Giovanni Agnolo Canini. It contains 50 engravings of ancient medals, coins and jewellery. A reprint in Italian and French appeared at Amsterdam in 1731.

== Gallery ==
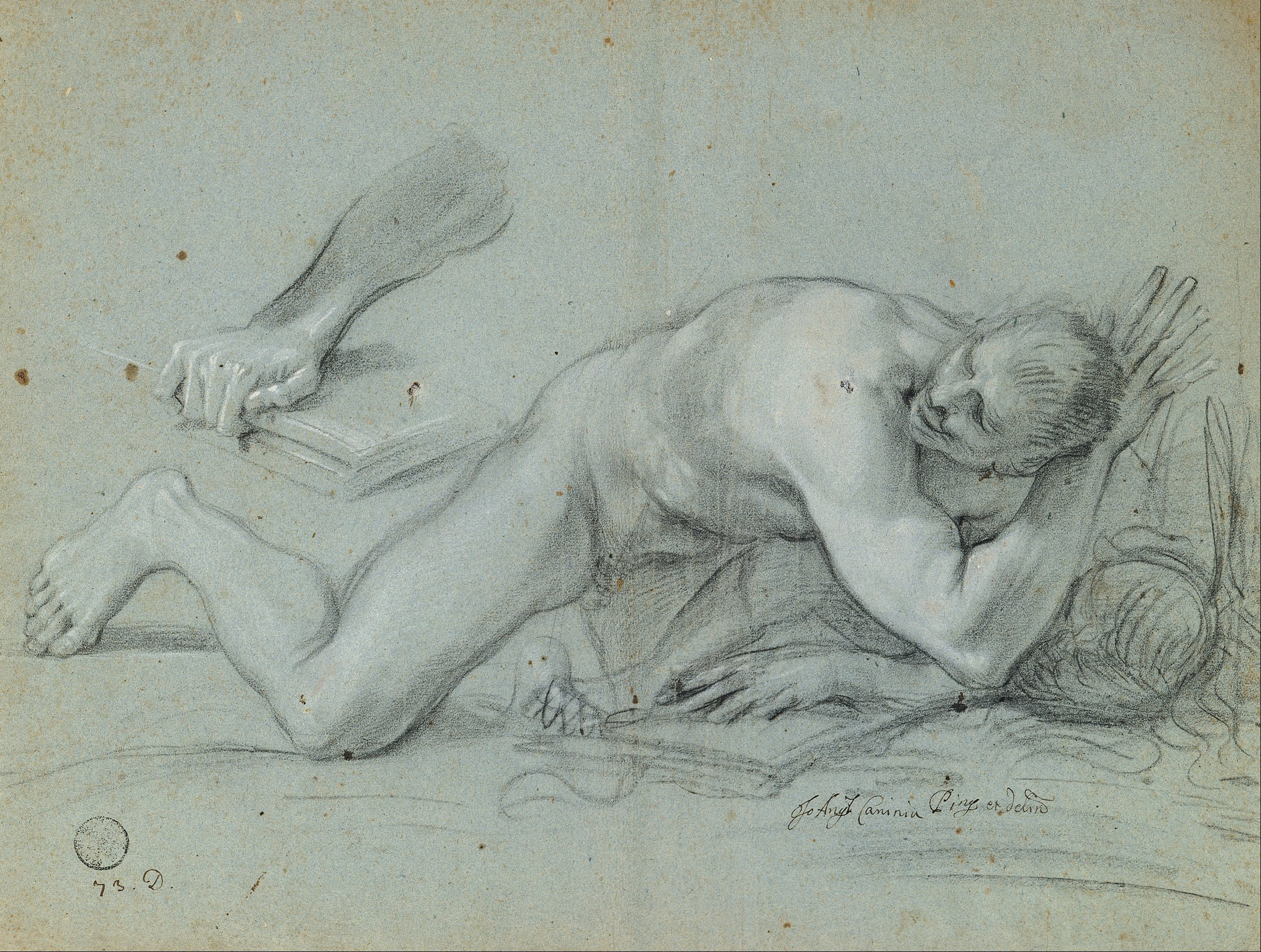
Study for a Fallen Angel, Museum Kunstpalast, Düsseldorf

Sleeping Eros. Copy after an ancient sculpture, Metropolitan Museum of Art, New York

Head of A Bearded Man, Los Angeles County Museum of Art, Los Angeles

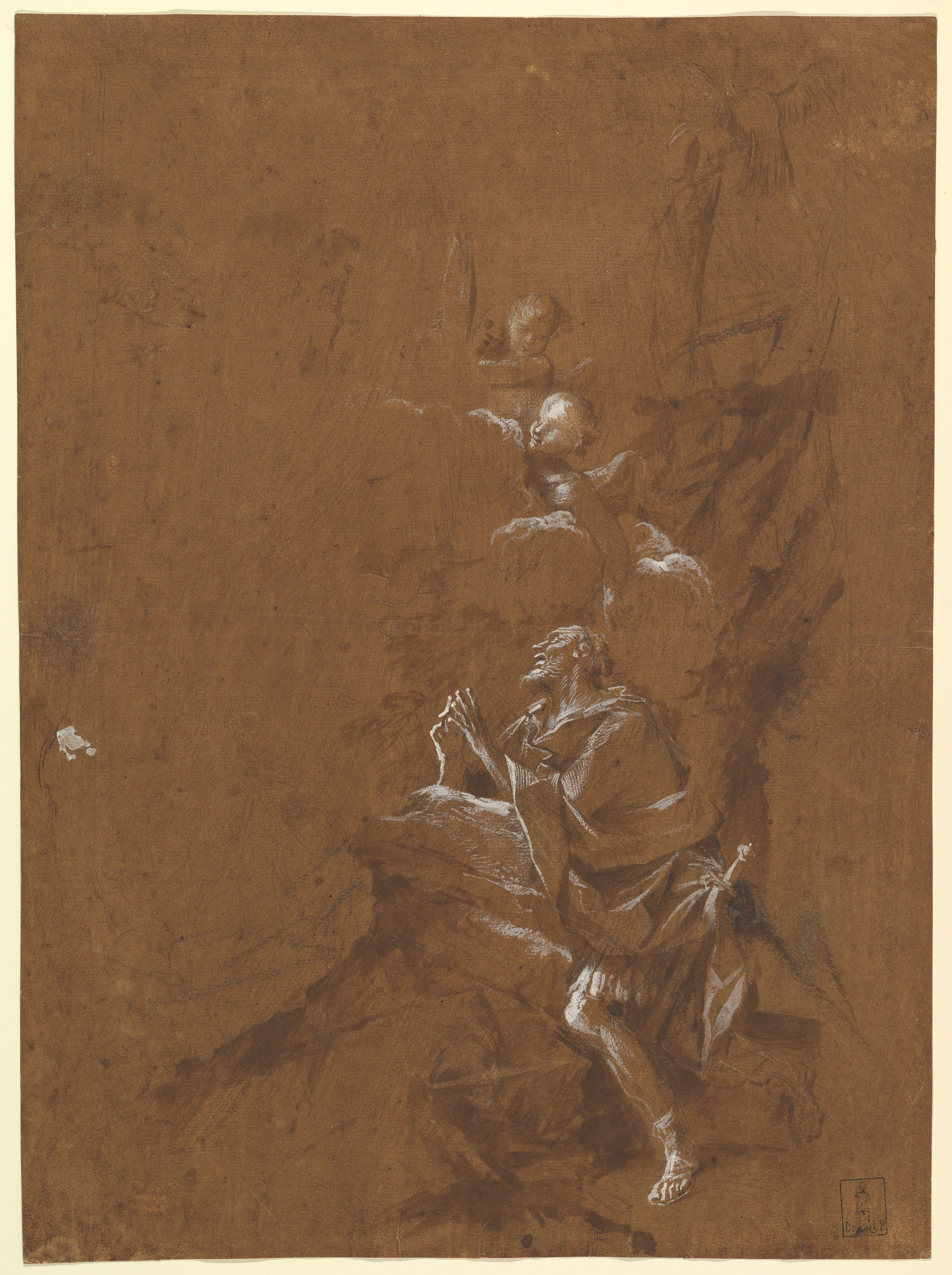
The Vision of Saint William of Aquitaine, Metropolitan Museum of Art, New York

The Virgin and Child Appearing to Saint Anthony of Padua and a Hermit, Metropolitan Museum of Art, New York

Tarpeia crushed under the shields of the Sabines, National Gallery of Denmark, Cophenagen

Allegorical Composition with a Young Man Kneeling before a Tree, Metropolitan Museum of Art, New York

Man and a woman in antique-style attire, National Gallery of Denmark, Copenhagen

== Bibliography ==
- Pampalone, Antonella (1975). "CANINI, Giovanni Angelo". Dizionario Biografico degli Italiani (in Italian). Vol. 18: Canella–Cappello. Rome: Institute of the Italian Encyclopaedia. ISBN 978-88-12-00032-6.
- Passeri, Giovanni Battista (1742). Vite de pittori, scultori ed architetti: che anno lavorato in Roma, morti dal 1641 fino al 1673. Natale Bariellini, Mercante di Libri a pasquino. pp. 364–369.
