= Louis Michel Halbou =

French draughtsman and engraver

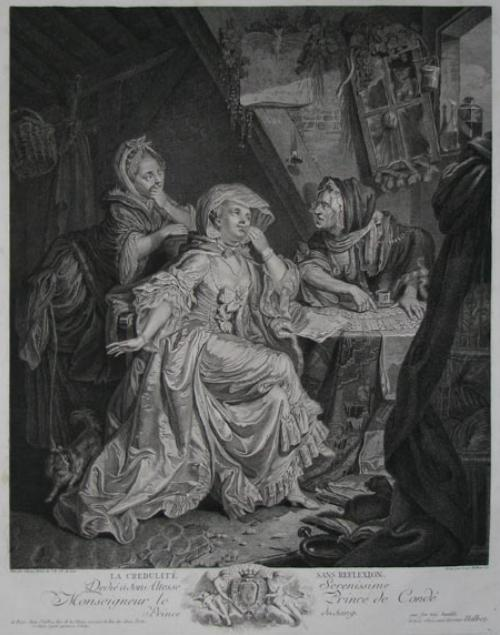
La Crédulité sans réflexion (Credulity without reflection, 1770), engraving dedicated to Louis Joseph, Prince of Condé after a painting by Schenau.

Louis Michel Halbou (1730–1809) was a French draughtsman and engraver of the pre-Romantic period, specialising in burin. His work can be found in several public collections such as the Edmond de Rothschild prints collection in the Louvre, the Musée du château de Versailles et du Trianon, the Art Institute of Chicago and the Wellcome Trust.

== Life ==
Few details survive of Halbou's biography. Émile Bellier de La Chavignerie states he was born in Paris in 1730 and calls him a "student [ie apprentice] of Nicolas-Gabriel Dupuis", whilst another source adds that he must have had quite a long apprenticeship since his art was "flourishing around 1760". He completed several etchings designed by others and also sometimes drew vignettes (after Marillier). He mainly worked in Paris, where he was active between 1763 and 1800. He lived on the Rive gauche "at a parasol merchant's at the Soleil d'or" on rue de la Comédie-Française, then on rue du Fouarre and finally on rue des Rats (1803), putting him near the print-shop quarter of the city. His students included Nicolas-Auguste Leisnier.

The March 1763 edition of L'Avant-coureur and the 1768 Salon mention him by the name of "Louis Halbou", as does Hérissant, the Paris publisher of 39 plates by Halbou in a 1769 edition of Traité de vénerie by Goury de Champgrand. Halbou had some success engraving moral scenes after works by Jean-Michel Moreau, Jean-Honoré Fragonard and Johann Eleazar Schenau, with his prints sold by the "Veuve Chéreau", Marguerite-Geneviève Chiquet, who had opened a shop on rue Saint-Jacques under the sign of the Deux Piliers d'or. Beraldi mentions a 1792 receipt for 1600 livres, a "considerable sum for the time", signed by the merchant Laurent for Halbou's engraving after Adriaen van der Werff's La Madeleine dans sa retraite (Mary Magdalene in the Desert). Halbou also contributed to several collections of illustrations and his work is also to be found in the Cabinet Basan (1771), published by Ruault (1785), the Didot jeune (1789) and the Musée français.
