= Pasqual Pere Moles =

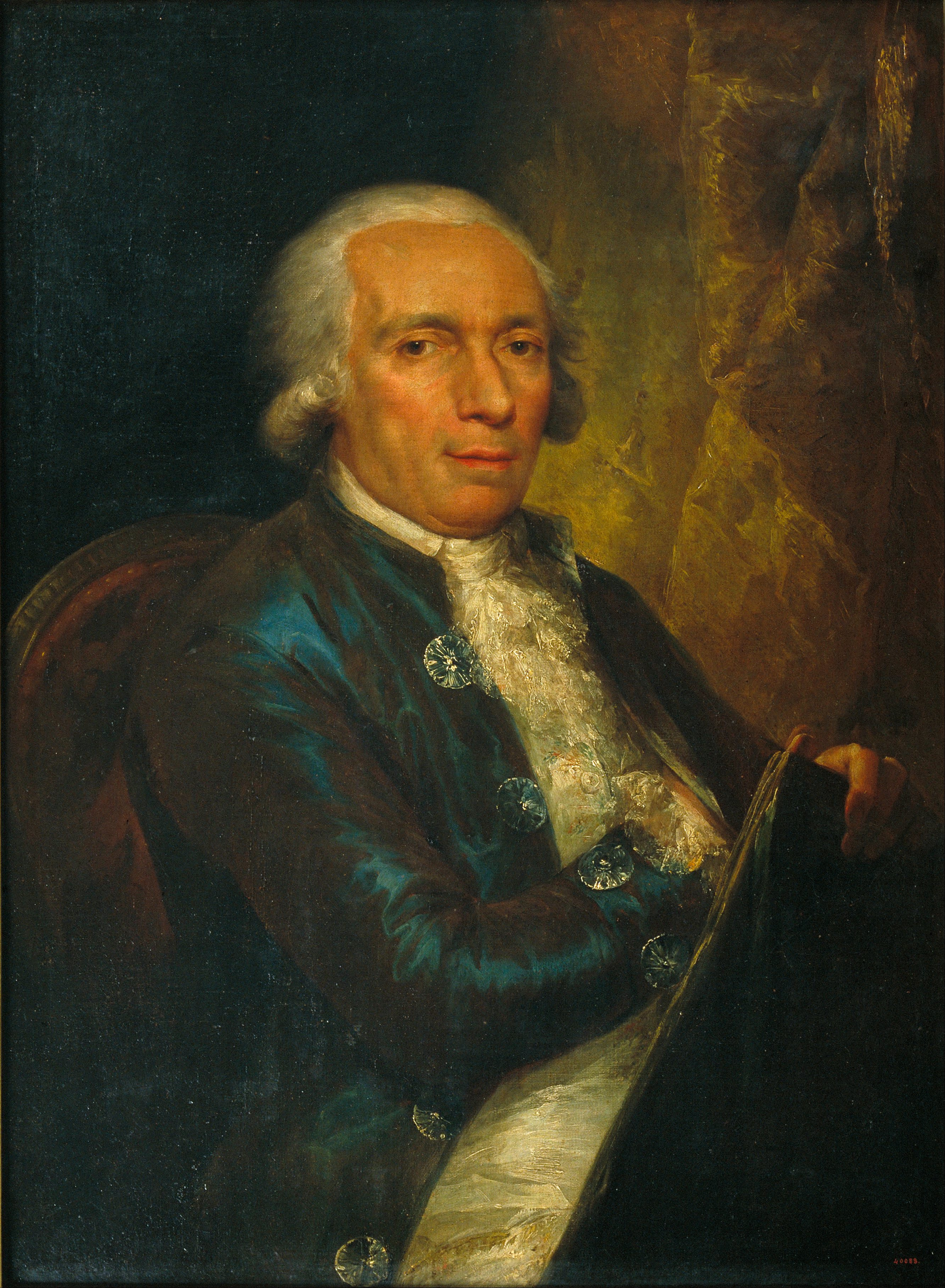
Pasqual Pere Moles; portrait by Vicente López Portaña

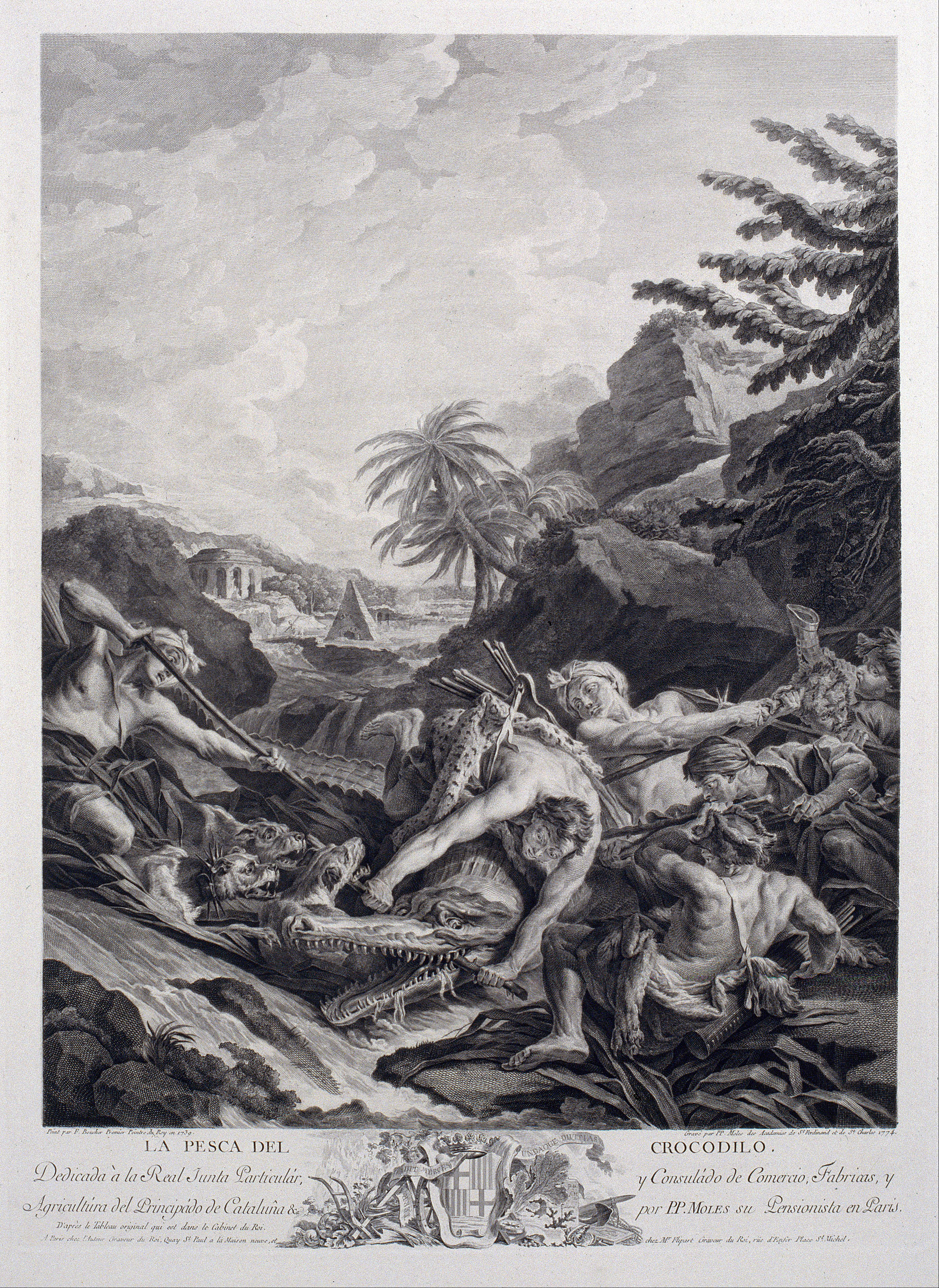
Crocodile Hunting

Pasqual Pere Moles i Coronas, also known as Pedro Pascual Moles (23 October 1741, Valencia - 26 October 1797, Barcelona) was a Spanish engraver who served as the first Director of the Escola de la Llotja; a position he held until his death.

== Life and works ==
His father, Salvador, was a bookseller. He originally studied with José Vergara and José Camarón; followed by studies at the newly opened Real Academia de Bellas Artes de San Carlos in Valencia. Later, he was a student of Francesc Tramulles i Roig in Barcelona. He decided to remain there. In 1762, became an engraver for the Junta de Comercio, and participated in creating engravings for the Máscara Real (Royal Mask, 1764), a theatrical event in 1759 that celebrated the arrival of King Charles III and his wife, Maria Amalia of Saxony, in Barcelona. His contributions led to his being named a Supernumerary Academic at the Real Academia de Bellas Artes de San Fernando. Thanks to a pension granted by the Junta, he was able to improve his skills by studying in Paris with Nicolas-Gabriel Dupuis and Charles-Nicolas Cochin, from 1766 to 1774.

He was one of the founders of the "Escuela Gratuita de Diseño" (Free School of Design, now the Escola de la Llotja), sponsored by the Junta de Comercio, which opened in 1775 at the Llotja de Mar. As Director, he was an advocate of the academic approach of Anton Raphael Mengs, and was opposed to the traditional method of teaching art as a profession. In addition to organizing the school, he helped create the school's museum, which became the first art museum in Catalonia; currently located at the Reial Acadèmia Catalana de Belles Arts de Sant Jordi. During these years, he continued to work as an engraver; becoming an expert in chalcography. After 1779, he devoted much time and effort contributing to illustrations for the Memorias históricas by Antonio de Capmany.

After a brief period of mental instability, which received only passing notice from his associates, he committed suicide by throwing himself from one of the school's windows.

== Bibliografía ==
- Rosa Maria Subirana i Rebull, Pasqual Pere Moles i Corones. València 1741 - Barcelona 1797. Barcelona: Biblioteca de Catalunya, 1990 ISBN 978-84-7845-004-6
