= Saint-Benoît-le-Bétourné =

Former Church in Paris, France

Coordinates: 48.8493°N 2.3447°E

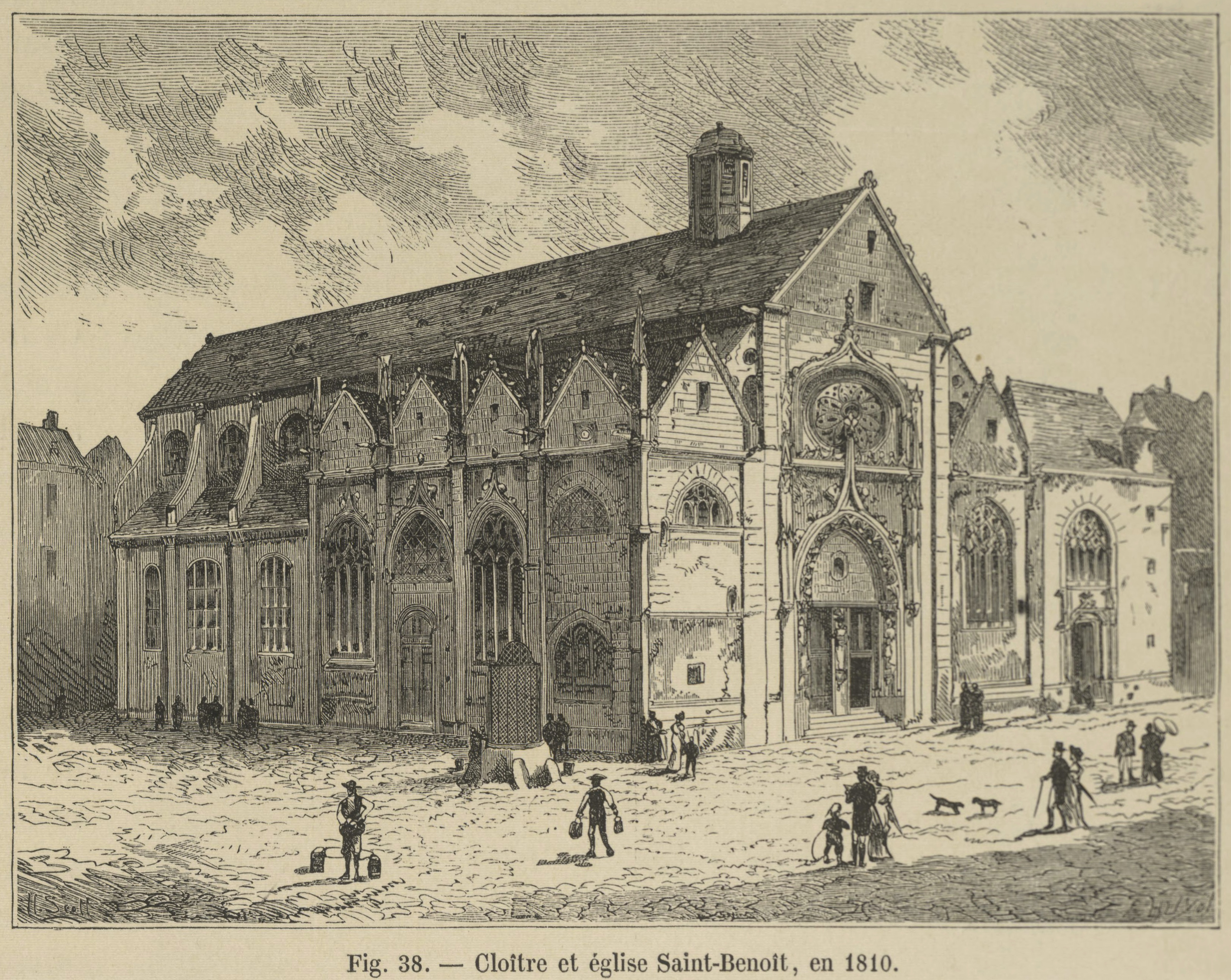
The church building in 1810

Saint-Benoît-le-Bétourné (French pronunciation: [sɛ̃ bənwa lə betuʁne]) was a church in Paris. Originally dedicated to the martyrs Sergius and Bacchus, it was founded in the 6th century on rue Saint-Jacques in what is now the 5th arrondissement of Paris. It was demolished in 1831 to build the théâtre du Panthéon, which was itself demolished in 1854 to build rue des Écoles.

== History ==
According to Raoul of Presles the church was founded by Denis of Paris, who carried his head to its site after his execution, blessing the location, preaching a sermon on the Holy Trinity and dedicating it to "Benoît Sire Dieu" ("Blessed be the Lord our God"). Its spelling changed over the centuries and so the church's dedication seems to have shifted to Benedict (in French "Benoît") of Nursia.

Traditionally the church's master builder mistakenly added its choir to the west end not the east, leading to its nickname of "le bétourné" ("the [church] turned the wrong way round"). Around 1280-1300 it is mentioned in Le Dit des rues de Paris by Guillot de Paris as Saint-Beneoit le bestourné. Francis I of France restored its usual name early in the 16th century and it then took the nickname "le bistourné" ("the twice-turned [church]"), later bowdlerised into "le bestourné", possibly to bring it back closer to its old name.

One of the church's chaplains was Guillaume de Villon, tutor to François Villon, and Charles Perrault was buried in the church. In the Middle Ages the church housed an altar of Maturinus, patron of the mad and possessed, around which a devotion to him sprang up and to which many ill people were brought in hope of a cure.

During the reign of Louis IX of France, the church's cloister housed a public market. He also granted the canons of Notre Dame de Paris a right to sell bread and wine in that market. The cloister's vast barns allowed the canons to store the grain and wine paid as dues to the canons. The church and its land were sold on 5 October 1791, 8 October 1791 and 30 September 1798. and in 1790 the revolutionary authorities turned it into a store for horse fodder. It was destroyed in 1854 to build rue des Écoles.
