= Charles Dupuis (engraver) =

French engraver

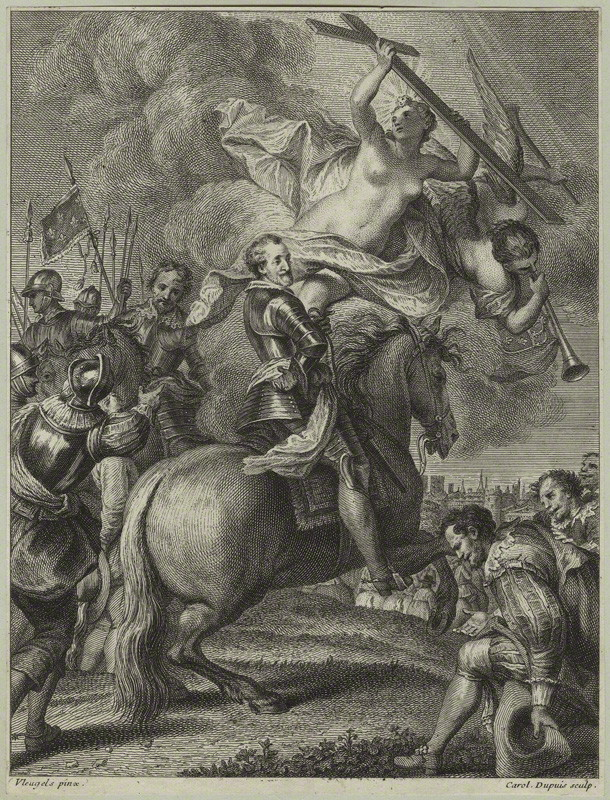
King Henry IV, after Philippe Vleughels

Charles Dupuis (1685, Paris – 3 March 1742) was a French engraver, who based many of his works on the paintings in the galleries at Versailles and the Palais-Royal.

As early as 1712, he was in London, together with Claude Dubosc, to assist Nicolas Dorigny in his engravings of the tapestry designs known as the "Raphael Cartoons". He was elected a member of the Académie royale de peinture et de sculpture in 1730.

His brother, Nicolas-Gabriel Dupuis, was also a well known engraver.

== Selected works ==
- Earth and Air, after Louis Boullogne
- Saint John in the Desert
- The Marriage of the Virgin, after Van Loo
