= Charles-François-Adrien Macret =

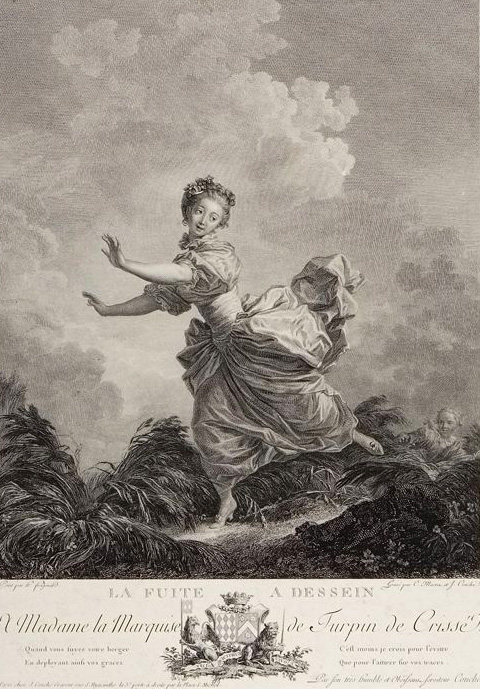
The Feigned Flight, after Fragonard

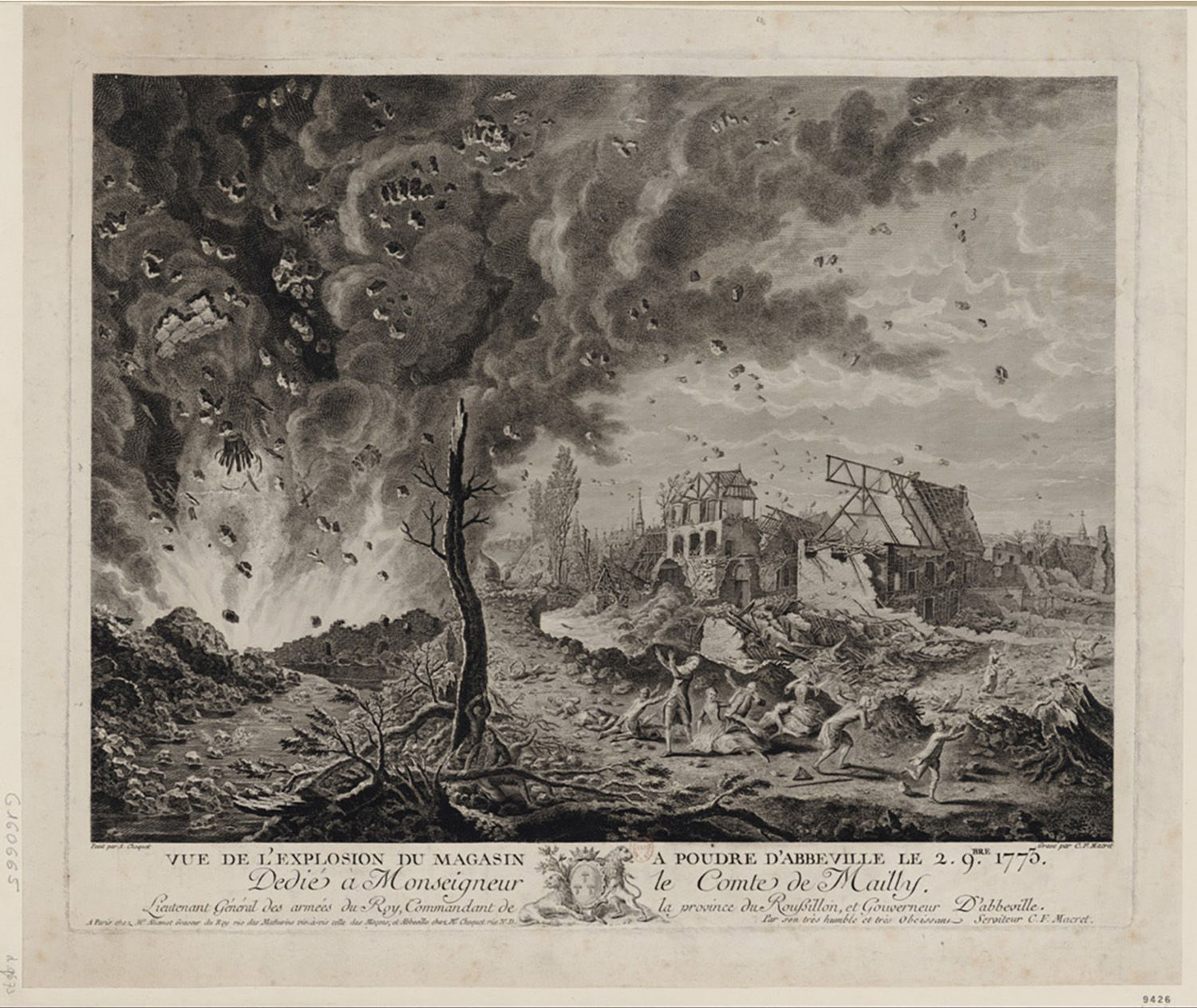
The Explosion of the Powder Magazine in Abbeville (1775)

Charles-François-Adrien Macret (2 May 1751, Abbeville - 24 December 1783, Paris) was a French designer and engraver. His works were signed, variously, as Macret, Carolus Macret, C. Macret and C.F. Macret.

== Biography ==
He was the second of seven children born to Jean-Baptiste Macret, a soapmaker, and his wife, Marie-Charlotte. His older sister, Marie-Anne-Françoise-Charlotte, married the painter, Pierre-Adrien Choquet (1743-1813). His youngest brother, Jean-César, also became an engraver. His father died in 1772, when he fell into a soapmaking vat and was fatally scalded.

He began his artistic education at the age of thirteen, when he was apprenticed to a metal engraver named Joseph Selik, originally from Hanover, who specialized in heraldry. It was from this first artisanal experience that he made contact with the Parisian engravers, Nicolas-Gabriel Dupuis and Claude-Antoine Littrey de Montigny (c.1735-1775). After their deaths, he continued his studies with Jacques-Philippe Le Bas, Jacques Aliamet and Augustin de Saint-Aubin. He appears to have had a special relationship with Saint-Aubin, who allowed him to take joint credit on several works.

In 1777, he married Marie-Julie Petit and they had three children.

According to his brother-in-law, Choquet, he was always thin, delicate and sickly. He died of a persistent fever, perhaps aggravated by overwork, aged only thirty-two. What he intended to be his masterwork, a depiction of the Siege of Beauvais (1472), was left unfinished, along with several smaller works.
