= Gaspard Duchange =

French engraver (1662–1757)

Gaspard Duchange (1662–1757) was a French engraver.

== Life ==
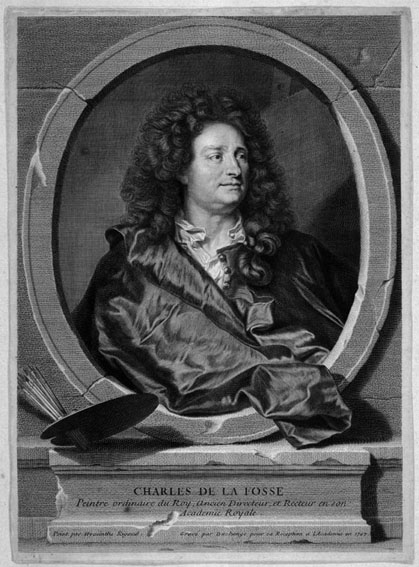
Charles de La Fosse, after La Fosse's self-portrait

Duchange was born in Paris in 1662. He was a pupil of Guillaume Vallet and then of Jean Audran. He was received into the Academy in 1707 and died in Paris in 1757.

== Style ==
According to Joseph Strutt in his Biographical Dictionary of Engravers (1786), Duchange's style was similar to that of his teacher, Audran, but in general neater, with the use of etching not so predominant. Strutt did not think that Duchange's drawing was as good as Audran's, but concluded that his prints "though mannered, and often rather laboured, have much to recommend them to the connoisseur, especially such as are pleased with agreeable management of the graver."

== List of works ==
Duchange engraved a considerable number of plates. They include:

=== Portraits ===
- François Girardon; after Rigaud; presented for Duchange's reception into the Academy in 1707.
- Charles de La Fosse, painter; after a self-portrait; presented upon the same occasion.
- Antoine Coypel, with his Son; after a self-portrait.

=== Subjects after various artists ===
After Correggio:

- Jupiter and Io
- Jupiter and Danae
- Jupiter and Ledas

After Paolo Veronese:

- The Entombment of Christ

After Jouvenet:

- Mary Magdalen washing the Feet of Christ
- Christ driving the Buyers and Sellers from the Temple

After Antoine Coypel:

- The Sacrifice of Jephtha.
- Tobit recovering his Sight
- Venus sleeping, with three Loves and a Satyr
- The Death of Dido
- The Bath of Diana

After Noël-Nicolas Coypel:

- Solon explaining his Laws to the Athenians;
- Trajan dispensing Justice to the People

After Desormeaux:

- Diana disarming Cupid

After Rubens:

- The Birth of Mary de' Medici;
- The Landing of Mary de' Medici at Marseilles
- The Marriage of Henry IV. and Mary de' Medici
- The Apotheosis of Henry IV. and Regency of Mary de' Medici
- The Interview of Mary de' Medici and her son, Louis XIII

These five last plates were engraved for the Luxembourg Gallery.
