= Clément-Pierre Marillier =

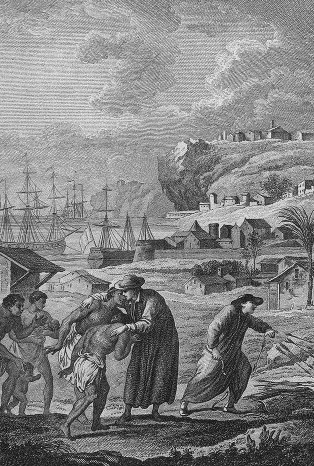
Quakers embracing Native Americans in Pennsylvania. Intaglio after Marillier, in Histoire des deux Indes, 1775.

Clément-Pierre Marillier (20 June 1740 – 11 August 1808) was a French draughtsman and engraver.

Born in Dijon, he was most notable for his book illustrations, such as those for Le Cabinet des fées. Some of his compositions were engraved as vignettes by Louis Michel Halbou. He died in Melun in 1808.

== Works ==
- Pau, Musée national du château de Pau, Le Siège de Beauvais, drawings by Marillier, engraved by Jean-Jacques Avril.
- Frontispieces to the two volumes of the completeworks of Salomon Gessner, published in Paris by Dusart, designed and engraved by Marillier
