= Guillot of Paris =

French poet

Guillot or Guiot of Paris was a late 13th or early 14th century French poet, author of the Le Dit des rues de Paris (dated to 1280–1300).

== Life ==
All that we know of his life comes from biographical details in the Dit and its context. A man of letters, possibly a scribe, he was not a high-ranking poet. At the start of Dit he states he had edited several other texts: "Maint dit a fait de Roys, de Conte, Guillot de Paris en son conte" (lines 3 and 4). He demonstrates a poetic touch in his concise and color-filled descriptions of the streets of Paris. He lived in the reign of King Philip III of France (1245-1285), a time when the population of Paris was growing fast, requiring construction of a succession of enclosing walls ringing the city. In 1300 the population of Paris might have been 200 000 including the faubourgs, Gérard has estimated.

== Dit ==
A minor work of great importance for its portrayal of the Paris of the period, Dit was first published in 1754 by abbé Lebeuf, who discovered the manuscript in Dijon in 1754.The reference version was produced by Edgar Mareuse in 1875 after carefully reviewing the text against the manuscript preserved in the Bibliotheque nationale de France, and enriching it with notes, a glossary and preface.

A long poem of 554 verses of eight syllables in an AABB rhyme scheme, Dit enumerates the streets of Paris, approaching them through the neighborhoods which then made up the capital: to the north the Rive Droite (right bank), Outre Grand-Pont ("Beyond Great Bridge"), also called the City, to the south the Left Bank, Outre-Petit-Pont ("Beyond Little Bridge"), also known as the University, and on the island, Île de la Cité, the cradle of Paris.

== Influence ==
Guillot offers tasty descriptions for each of the 310 streets of Paris of the time, small scenes in few words, used like brush strokes to show the sellers of wheat and cloth, the butchers, tailors, armourers and goldsmiths, and even the prostitutes and footpads. Some of these streets have disappeared but most of them have not, even if in 700 years some of them have changed in name or appearance, or part of their original span has been amputated.

In the history of literature, the perambulations of Guillot, who takes his readers into the streets of the great Parisian labyrinth, foreshadow the genre of the Parisian urban stroll, which reached its apogee in the 19th century in the writings of Gérard de Nerval such as Nuits d'octobre (October Nights) and Mémoires d'un Parisen (Memoirs of a Parisian), as well as in Charles Baudelaire's Fleurs du mal and Spleen de Paris (Petits poèmes en prose).

== Bibliography ==
=== Manuscripts ===
- Paris, Bibliothèque nationale de France, in French, 24432, f. 257va-261vb |N|

=== Modern editions in anthologies ===
- Abbé Lebeuf, Histoire de la ville et du diocèse de Paris (History of the City and of the Diocese of Paris), 1754, v. 1, p. 563.
- Pierre-Thomas-Nicolas Hurtaut and Magny, Dictionnaire de la ville de Paris et de ses environs (Dictionary of the City of Paris and Surrounding Areas), 1779, v. 4, p. 599.
- Fabliaux et contes des poètes françois des XI, XII, XIII, XIV et XVe siècles, tirés des meilleurs auteurs (Fables and Tales of French poets of the 11th, 12th, 13th, 14th and 15th Centuries, Drawn from the Best Authors), published by Barbazan. New edition, expanded and reviewed against the manuscripts, by M. Méon, Paris, Warée, 1808, 3 v., xxii + 465, xiv + 467, xxxii + 514 p. (. 2, p. 237-276) [IA: v. 1, v. 2, v. 3, v. 4]. Reissue: Geneva, Slatkine Reprints, 1976.
- Jean La Tynna, Dictionnaire topographique, historique et étymologique des Rues de Paris (Topographical, Historical and Etymological Dictionary of the Streets of Paris), 2nd ed., 1816, p. lii.
- J.-B. de Saint-Victor, Tableau historique et pittoresque de Paris, 1822, v. 1, p. 431.
- Jean Béraud and Dufey, Dictionnaire historique de Paris (Historical Dictionary of Paris), 1828, v. 2, p. 154.
- Emile de La Bédollière, Le Nouveau Paris (The New Paris), 1860, p. 437.
- L. Lazare, Publications administratives (Administrative Publications), 1862, v. 2, p. 28.
- Hippolyte Cocheris, Réimpression de l'Histoire de la ville de Paris, by Abbé Lebeuf, v.4, p. 7.
- Les rues de Paris mises en vers à la fin du XIII siecle par Guillot, publiées d'après un manuscrit du XIV siècle (The Streets of Paris Put Into Verse at the End of the 13th Century by Guillot, Following a 14th Century Manuscript), Paris, Baillieu, 1866, 44 p. [IA]

=== As a single work ===
- Le dit des rues de Paris (1300), by Guillot (de Paris), with preface, notes and glossary, Edgar Mareuse editor, monograph in one volume (pp XXIV-91), followed by a map of Paris under Philip IV of France, éditions Librairie générale, Paris, 1875.
- Le Dit des Rues de Paris, by Guillot de Paris, Edgar Mareuse ed. (preface) and Catherine Nicolas (translator), Les Éditions de Paris-Max Chaleil, 2012.

=== Studies ===
- Arthur Långfors, Les incipit des poèmes français antérieurs au XVIe siècle. Répertoire bibliographique établi à l'aide de notes de M. Paul Meyer (Beginnings of the French Poem Before the 16th Century: Bibliographic inventory established with help from the notes of Mr Paul Meyer), Paris, Champion, 1917, vii + 444 p. (p. 213) [IA]. Dict.: DEAF LångforsInc. Reprinted: New York, Burt Franklin (Bibliography and Reference Series, 380; Essays in Literature and Criticism, 100), 1970.

=== External links ===
- Dictionnaire historique de la ville de Paris et de ses environs
- Fabliaux et contes des poètes françois des XI, XII, XIII, XIVe et XVe siècles: tirés des meilleurs auteurs Volume 1
- Dictionnaire topographique, étymologique et historique des rues de Paris
