= Le Dit des rues de Paris =

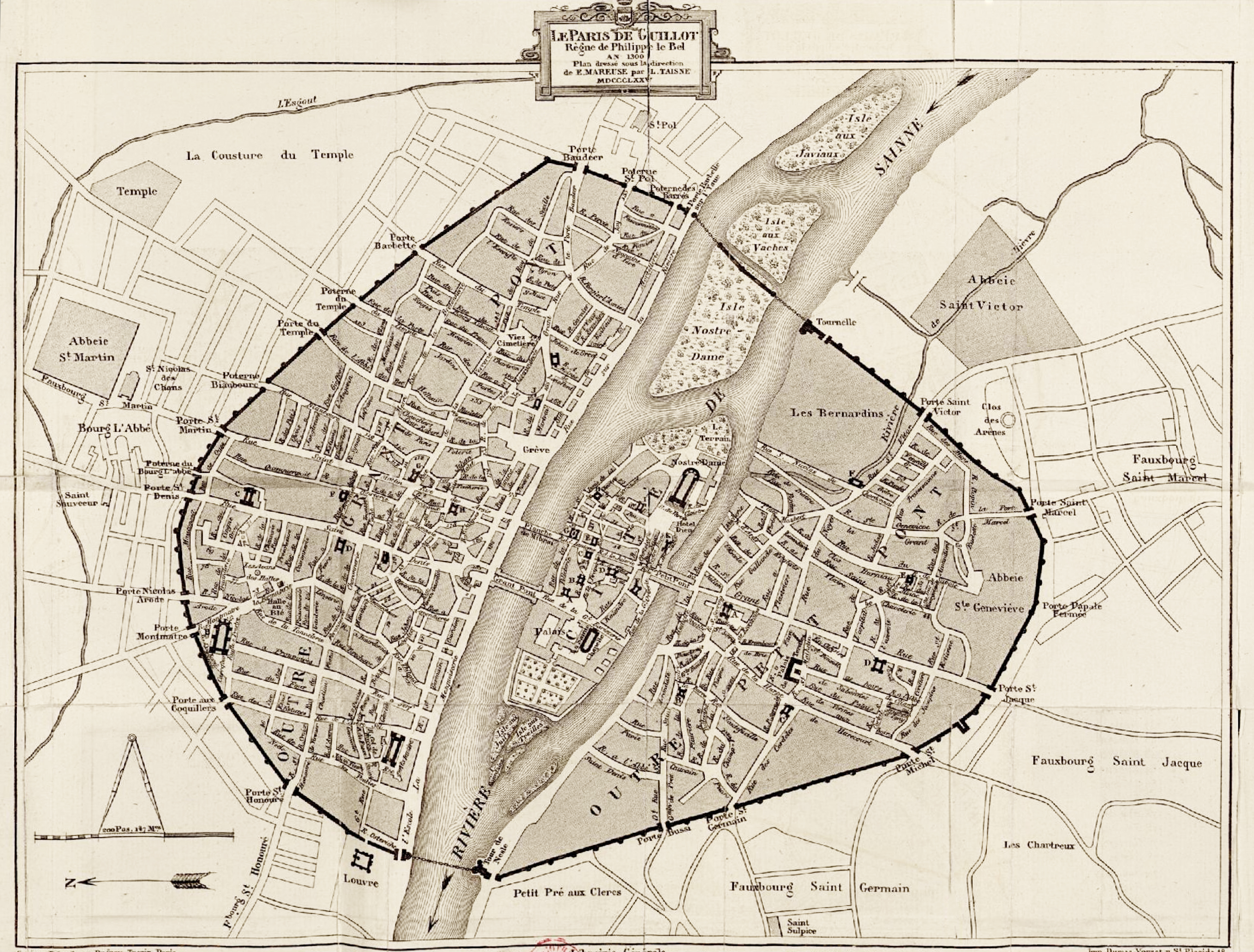
Map of Paris at the time of Le Dit des rues de Paris c. 1280–1300.

Title page of an 1875 edition of the work

Le Dit des rues de Paris (French pronunciation: [lə di de ʁy də paʁi]) is a 554-verse poem in octosyllabic rhyming couplets, in an AABB rhyme scheme, written by Guillot of Paris and describing the streets of Paris between around 1280 and 1300. It deals with 310 streets, organised into the city's three main districts at that time:

- to the north on the Rive Droite, the Outre-Grand-Pont district, also known as "la Ville" ("the city")
- to the south on the Rive Gauche, the Outre-Petit-Pont district, also known as "l'Université" ("the University")
- on the island, the Cité district, cradle of Paris

It does not include cul de sacs, which its author calls rues sans chief.

== Bibliography ==
- Guillot of Paris : Le Dit des rues de Paris avec préface, notes et glossaire par Edgar Mareuse.
- Étienne Barbazan, Crapelet, Méon, Joly de Fleury : Fabliaux et contes des poètes françois des XI, XII, XIII, XIV et XVe siècles Tome 2
- Jean de La Tynna : Dictionnaire topographique, étymologique et historique des rues de Paris
- Jacques Hillairet : Dictionnaire historique des rues de Paris
