= 13th Tony Awards =

1959 US theatrical awards ceremony

- Date: April 12, 1959
- Location: Waldorf-Astoria; New York City
- Hosted by: Bud Collyer
- Most wins: Redhead (6)
- Most nominations: Redhead (7)

Television/radio coverage
- Network: CBS

The 13th Annual Tony Awards took place at the Waldorf-Astoria Grand Ballroom on April 12, 1959, and was broadcast on local television station WCBS-TV in New York City. The Master of Ceremonies was Bud Collyer.

== Eligibility ==
Shows that opened on Broadway during the 1958 season before February 28, 1959 are eligible.

Original plays

- The Ages of Man
- The Cold Wind And The Warm
- Comes a Day
- Cue for Passion
- The Disenchanted
- Drink to Me Only
- Edwin Booth
- Epitaph for George Dillon
- The Family Reunion
- The Firstborn
- The Gazebo
- The Girls in 509
- God and Kate Murphy
- Handful of Fire
- Howie
- Jane Eyre
- J.B.
- The Legend of Lizzie
- Love Me Little
- A Majority of One
- Make a Million
- The Man in the Dog Suit
- The Marriage-Go-Round
- The Night Circus
- Once More, with Feeling!
- Patate
- The Pleasure of His Company
- The Power and the Glory
- Rashomon
- Requiem for a Nun
- The Rivalry
- Say, Darling
- Tall Story
- Third Best Sport
- A Touch of the Poet
- The Visit
- Who Was That Lady I Saw You With?
- The World of Suzie Wong

Original musicals

- Flower Drum Song
- Goldilocks
- International Soiree
- La Plume de Ma Tante
- Maria Golovin
- The Next President
- A Party with Betty Comden and Adolph Green
- Redhead
- Whoop-Up

Play revivals

- Back to Methuselah
- The Beaux' Stratagem
- Britannicus
- The Broken Jug
- Don Juan
- Hamlet
- Henry V
- La Jalousie du Barbouille
- Le Cid
- Le Malade Imaginaire
- Le Mariage Force
- Lorenzaccio
- Marie Tudor
- Sganarelle
- The Shadow of a Gunman
- Le Triomphe de l'Amour
- Twelfth Night
- The Two Gentlemen of Verona
- The Waltz of the Toreadors

Musical revivals

- The Most Happy Fella

== The ceremony ==
Presenters: Dana Andrews, Ina Balin, Ralph Bellamy, Polly Bergen, Claudette Colbert, Robert Dowling, Faye Emerson, Farley Granger, Oscar Hammerstein II, Celeste Holm, Robert Preston, and Rip Torn. Music was by Meyer Davis and his Orchestra.

== Winners and nominees ==
Source:InfoPlease

Winners are in bold

Best Play	Best Musical
**J.B. – Archibald MacLeish**; A Touch of the Poet – Eugene O'Neill; Epitaph for George Dillon – John Osborne and Anthony Creighton; The Disenchanted – Budd Schulberg and Harvey Breit; The Visit – Friedrich Dürrenmatt	**Redhead**; Flower Drum Song; La Plume de Ma Tante
Best Performance by a Leading Actor in a Play	Best Performance by a Leading Actress in a Play
**Jason Robards – The Disenchanted as Manley Halliday**; Cedric Hardwicke – A Majority of One as Koichi Asano; Alfred Lunt – The Visit as Anton Schill; Christopher Plummer – J.B. as Nickles; Cyril Ritchard – The Pleasure of His Company as Biddeford Poole; Robert Stephens – Epitaph for George Dillon as George Dillon	**Gertrude Berg – A Majority of One as Bertha Jacoby**; Claudette Colbert – The Marriage-Go-Round as Content Lowell; Lynn Fontanne – The Visit as Claire Zachanassian; Kim Stanley – A Touch of the Poet as Sara Melody; Maureen Stapleton – The Cold Wind And The Warm as Aunt Ida
Best Performance by a Leading Actor in a Musical	Best Performance by a Leading Actress in a Musical
**Richard Kiley – Redhead as Tom Baxter**; Larry Blyden – Flower Drum Song as Sammy Fong	**Gwen Verdon – Redhead as Essie Whimple**; Miyoshi Umeki – Flower Drum Song as Mei-Li
Best Performance by a Supporting or Featured Actor in a Play	Best Performance by a Supporting or Featured Actress in a Play
**Charlie Ruggles – The Pleasure of His Company as Mackenzie Savage**; Marc Connelly – Tall Story as Professor Charles Osman; George Grizzard – The Disenchanted as Shep Stearns; Walter Matthau – Once More, with Feeling! as Maxwell Archer; Robert Morse – Say, Darling as Ted Snow; George C. Scott – Comes a Day as Tydings Glenn	**Julie Newmar – The Marriage-Go-Round as Katrin Sveg**; Maureen Delany – God and Kate Murphy as Carrie Donovan; Dolores Hart – The Pleasure of His Company as Jessica Poole; Nan Martin – J.B. as Sarah; Bertice Reading – Requiem for a Nun as Nancy Mannigoe
Best Performance by a Supporting or Featured Actor in a Musical	Best Performance by a Supporting or Featured Actress in a Musical
**Russell Nype – Goldilocks as George Randolph Brown** (tie); **Leonard Stone – Redhead as George Poppett** (tie)	**Pat Stanley – Goldilocks as Lois Lee**; Julienne Marie – Whoop-Up as Mary Champlain
Best Director	Best Choreography
**Elia Kazan – J.B.**; Peter Brook – The Visit; Robert Dhéry – La Plume de Ma Tante; William Gaskill – Epitaph for George Dillon; Peter Glenville – Rashomon; Cyril Ritchard – The Pleasure of His Company; Dore Schary – A Majority of One	**Bob Fosse – Redhead**; Agnes de Mille – Goldilocks; Carol Haney – Flower Drum Song; Onna White – Whoop-Up
Best Scenic Design	Best Costume Design
**Donald Oenslager – A Majority of One**; Boris Aronson – J.B.; Ballou – The Legend of Lizzie; Ben Edwards – Jane Eyre; Oliver Messel – Rashomon; Teo Otto – The Visit	**Rouben Ter-Arutunian – Redhead**; Antonio Castillo – Goldilocks; Dorothy Jenkins – The World of Suzie Wong; Oliver Messel – Rashomon; Irene Sharaff – Flower Drum Song
Best Conductor and Musical Director	Best Stage Technician
**Salvatore Dell'Isola – Flower Drum Song**; Jay Blackston – Redhead; Lehman Engel – Goldilocks; Gershon Kingsley – La Plume de Ma Tante	**Sam Knapp – The Music Man**; Thomas Fitzgerald – Who Was That Lady I Saw You With?; Edward Flynn – The Most Happy Fella

== Special awards ==
- John Gielgud, for contribution to theatre for his extraordinary insight into the writings of Shakespeare as demonstrated in his one-man play, The Ages of Man.
- Howard Lindsay and Russel Crouse, for a collaboration that lasted longer than Gilbert and Sullivan.
- Cast of La Plume de Ma Tante: Pamela Austin, Colette Brosset, Roger Caccia, Yvonne Constant, Genevieve Coulombel, Robert Dhéry, Michael Kent, Jean Lefevre, Jacques Legras, Michael Modo, Pierre Olaf, Nicole Parent, Ross Parker, Henri Pennec, for contribution to the theatre.

=== Multiple nominations and awards ===
These productions had multiple nominations:

- 7 nominations: Redhead
- 6 nominations: Flower Drum Song
- 5 nominations: Goldilocks, J.B. and The Visit
- 4 nominations: La Plume de Ma Tante, A Majority of One and The Pleasure of His Company
- 3 nominations: The Disenchanted, Epitaph for George Dillon and Rashomon
- 2 nominations: The Marriage-Go-Round, A Touch of the Poet and Whoop-Up

The following productions received multiple awards.

- 6 wins: Redhead
- 2 wins: Goldilocks, J.B. and A Majority of One

== See also ==
- 31st Academy Awards
