= John Kerr (author) =

American editor, psychologist, and author

- Born: January 31, 1950; Washington, D.C., U.S.
- Died: July 18, 2016 (aged 66); Portland, Maine, U.S.
- Education: New York University
- Occupation: Author

John Michael Kerr (January 31, 1950 – July 18, 2016) was an American editor, psychologist, and author raised in New York City. He was best known for his 1993 book, A Most Dangerous Method: The Story of Jung, Freud, and Sabina Spielrein, which explores an episode in the history of psychoanalysis. It examined the relationship between Sigmund Freud, Carl Jung, and Sabina Spielrein. Previously, he wrote an essay titled "Beyond the Pleasure Principle and Back Again: Freud, Jung, and Sabina Spielrein".

== Early life and family ==
Kerr was born in Washington, D.C., to mother Jean Kerr and father Walter Kerr shortly before their relocation to Larchmont, New York. He was one of six siblings, the oldest being Christopher, then he and his twin Colin, and then the younger Gilbert, Gregory, and Kitty. Raised in a house of writers, his family was the subject of humorous articles written by his mother that would be collected into the volume Please Don't Eat the Daisies (1957).

== Education, visiting scholar ==
After a degree in political science from Harvard University, Kerr entered graduate school in psychology at New York University. Although not completing his doctorate, his learning in the field enabled him to fill the position of visiting scholar at Cornell University, Harvard, the Austen Riggs psychiatric treatment center in Stockbridge, Mass., and the William Alanson White Institute, which trains psychoanalysts and psychotherapists, located in New York City.

== Work as editor ==
At Cornell he met Paul E. Stepansky, a medical historian. He offered Kerr the position of associate editor at the Analytic Press, which published books for an audience primarily of psychotherapists. Accordingly, the company "through the 1980s and 1990s functioned as part incubator, part finishing school for books written by therapists". Stepansky described Kerr then: "He was a dazzling intellect.... I would give him manuscripts to review, and the reviews were these wide-ranging meditations, stylistic gems, with commentary that was often more illuminating than the manuscript itself."

In 1990 in Toronto, a conference titled "Freud and the History of Psychoanalysis" was held by the Hannah Institute for the History of Medicine. The subsequent book of essays was edited by Toby Gelfand and John Kerr. Kerr's essay "Epilogue: History and the Clinician" concluded the volume. In it, Kerr commented on the lack of enthusiasm by the practical-minded clinical community to recent advances in the study of the origins and early development of psychoanalysis. Kerr stated that by training he himself was more a clinician than a historian.

== A Most Dangerous Method ==
=== Book ===
A Most Dangerous Method: The Story of Jung, Freud, and Sabina Spielrein is the result of an eight-year examination of the relationship between Sigmund Freud, Carl Jung, and Sabina Spielrein, and creates a new narrative of the birth of psychoanalysis. John Kerr not only gives Spielrein her proper recognition for contributions to analytic theory, but gives fresh perspective on the Freud-Jung stalemate that resulted in the two parting ways.

Random House published A Most Dangerous Method in 1993, to the outrage of the psychoanalytical community. A few months later, the critic and academic Frederick Crews reviewed A Most Dangerous Method and other books on Freud, using the review to attack Freud's methods and practices. The essay would result in the largest influx of letters to the editor in the history of The New York Review of Books.

=== Stage, film ===
Soon after publication, talks were opened with production companies to adapt the book to film. Christopher Hampton was brought in as screenwriter. When talks stalled, Hampton adapted the work for stage. Entitled The Talking Cure, it opened in London in 2003.

Hampton subsequently wrote the screenplay for the 2011 David Cronenberg film A Dangerous Method.

== Later life and death ==
After a long stint in Brooklyn, Kerr relocated to Maine, in 1998. He resided in Portland's West End.

On July 18, 2016, he died at Maine Medical Center in Portland from complications of lung cancer, while surrounded by friends.
