= Richard Haydn =

English actor (1905–1985)

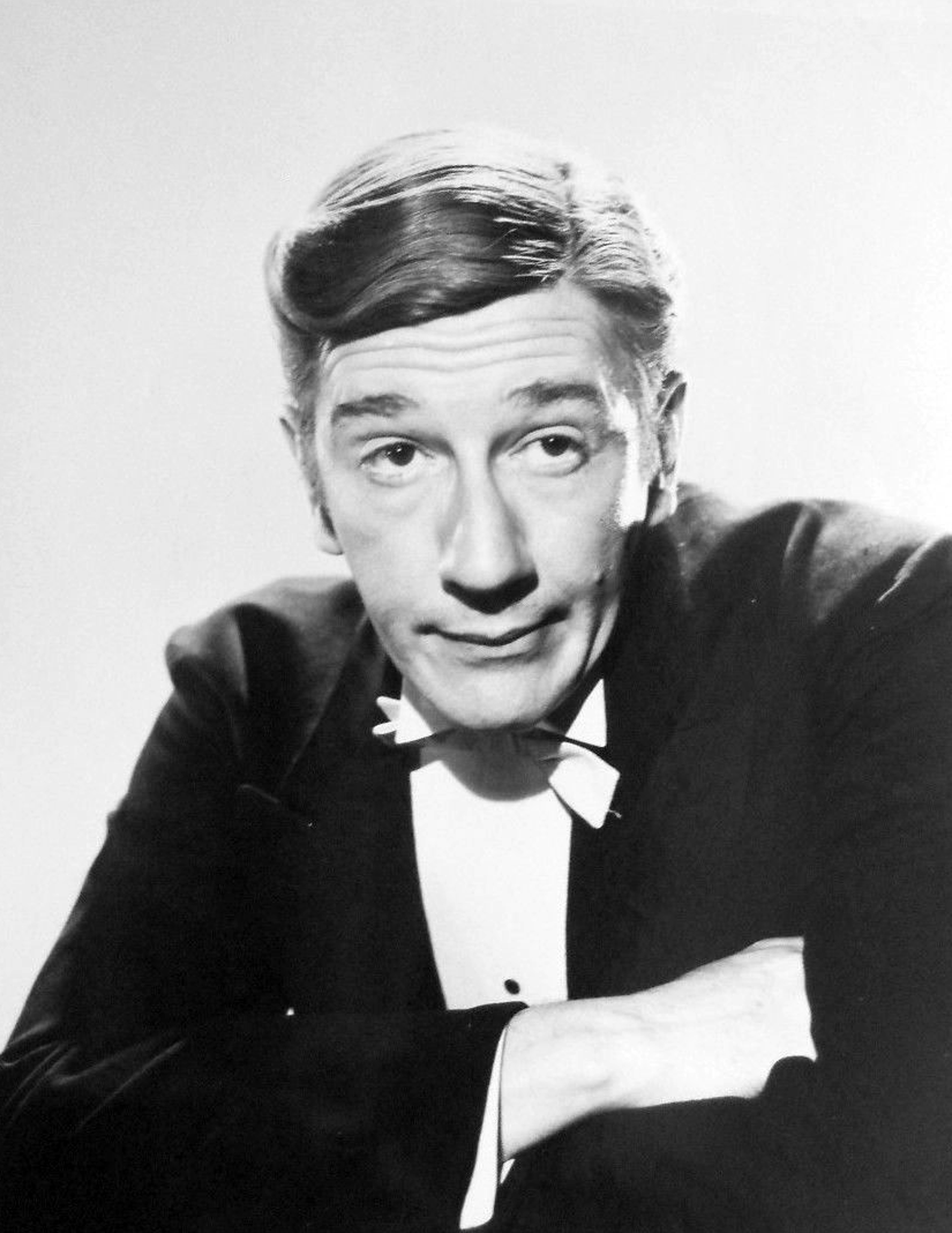
- Haydn in 1945
- Born: George Richard Haydon; March 10, 1905; Camberwell, London, England
- Died: April 25, 1985 (aged 80); Pacific Palisades, California, U.S.
- Occupation: Actor
- Years active: 1938–1985

George Richard Haydn (March 10, 1905 – April 25, 1985) was a British actor.

== Early life ==
George Richard Haydon was born in 1905 in Camberwell, in the London Borough of Southwark. After working as a music hall entertainer and overseer of a Jamaican banana plantation, he joined a touring British theatre troupe, where he shortened his last name from "Haydon" to "Haydn", and debuted on Broadway in 1939 in Set to Music and appeared in Two for the Show (1940).

== Career ==
Haydn was known for playing eccentric characters, such as Richard Rancyd (Miss Tatlock's Millions, 1948), Stanley Stayle (Dear Wife, 1949), and Claud Curdle (Mr. Music, 1950). Much of his stage delivery was done in a deliberate over-nasalised and over-enunciated manner.

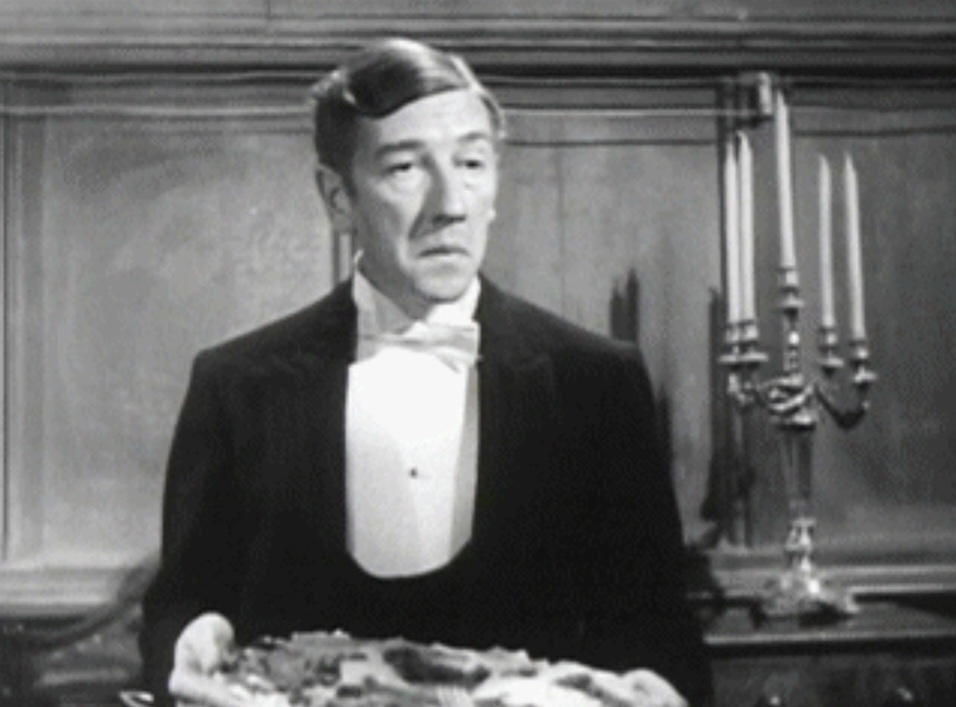
Haydn as Thomas Rogers in the 1945 film And Then There Were None

Some of Haydn's notable performances include Professor Oddley in Ball of Fire (1941), Roger in No Time for Love (1943), the manservant Thomas Rogers in And Then There Were None (1945), Emperor Franz Joseph in The Emperor Waltz (1948), the voice of the Caterpillar in Disney's Alice in Wonderland (1951), Baron Popoff in The Merry Widow (1952), and William Brown in Mutiny on the Bounty (1962). Haydn was acclaimed for his role in Rodgers and Hammerstein's 1965 film musical The Sound of Music, in which he played the Von Trapps' family friend Max Detweiler.

In the late 1940s, Haydn briefly worked as a film director, for the films Miss Tatlock's Millions (1948), Dear Wife (1949), and Mr. Music (1950). Haydn performed as the nosy neighbour and gossip in Sitting Pretty with Clifton Webb and Maureen O'Hara in 1948, using his over-nasal voice. He was Prof. Summerlee in 1960's The Lost World, and in the same year, played opposite Doris Day in Please Don't Eat the Daisies.

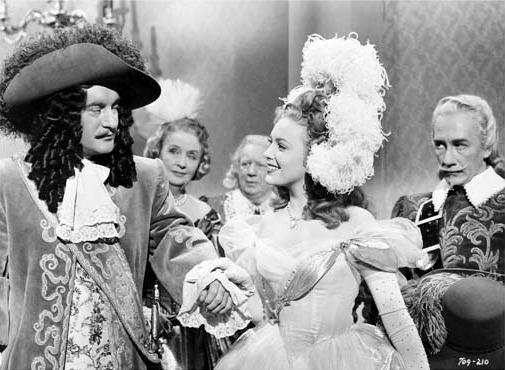
(L-R): George Sanders, Linda Darnell and Richard Haydn in Forever Amber (1947)

On radio, Haydn played Edwin Carp on The Charlie McCarthy Show, and he was a regular on The Swan Soap Show, which featured George Burns and Gracie Allen. Haydn wrote one book, titled The Journal of Edwin Carp, in 1954. In the 1960 The Twilight Zone episode "A Thing About Machines", Hayden played Bartlett Finchley, a quirky, self-absorbed, technophobe who is confronted by every machine in his home.

Haydn reprised the role of Edwin Carp for a 1964 episode of The Dick Van Dyke Show which saluted several old-time radio performers. He also appeared as a Japanese businessman in a 1968 episode of Bewitched, a magician in a 1969 episode of Bonanza, and a butler in a 1973 episode of Love American Style. Haydn's last film role was as Gerhard Falkstein in Young Frankenstein (1974).

== Death ==
On April 25, 1985, Haydn died from a heart attack at his home in Pacific Palisades, California, at the age of 80. His body was donated to the University of California, Los Angeles.

== Filmography ==
=== Film ===
| Year | Title | Role | Notes |
|---|---|---|---|
| 1938 | Red Peppers | George Pepper | TV movie |
| 1941 | Charley's Aunt | Charley Wyckham | |
| 1941 | Ball of Fire | Professor Oddley | |
| 1942 | Are Husbands Necessary? | Chuck | |
| 1942 | Thunder Birds | George Lockwood | |
| 1943 | Forever and a Day | Mr. Fulcher | |
| 1943 | No Time for Love | Roger Winant | |
| 1945 | Tonight and Every Night | Specialty | |
| 1945 | And Then There Were None | Thomas Rogers | |
| 1945 | Adventure | Limo | |
| 1946 | The Green Years | Jason Reid | |
| 1946 | Cluny Brown | Jonathon Wilson | |
| 1947 | The Beginning or the End | Doctor Chisholm | |
| 1947 | The Late George Apley | Horatio Willing | |
| 1947 | Singapore | Deputy Commissioner Hewitt | |
| 1947 | The Foxes of Harrow | Andre Leblanc | |
| 1947 | Forever Amber | Earl of Radcliffe | |
| 1948 | Sitting Pretty | Mr. Clarence Appleton | |
| 1948 | The Emperor Waltz | Emperor Franz-Josef | |
| 1948 | Miss Tatlock's Millions | Fergel | (as Richard Rancyd) |
| 1949 | Dear Wife | Early Riser | (as Stanley Stayle) |
| 1950 | Mr. Music | Jerome Thisbee | (as Claud Curdle) |
| 1951 | Alice in Wonderland | Caterpillar | Voice |
| 1952 | The Merry Widow | Baron Popoff | |
| 1953 | Never Let Me Go | Christopher Wellington St. John Denny | |
| 1953 | Money from Home | Bertie Searles | |
| 1954 | Her Twelve Men | Doctor Avord Barrett | |
| 1955 | Jupiter's Darling | Horatio | |
| 1956 | The Toy Tiger | John Fusenot | |
| 1958 | Twilight for the Gods | Oliver Wiggins | |
| 1960 | Please Don't Eat the Daisies | Alfred North | |
| 1960 | The Lost World | Professor Summerlee | |
| 1960 | Let's Make Love | Prologue Narrator | voice actor, uncredited |
| 1962 | Five Weeks in a Balloon | Sir Henry Vining | |
| 1962 | Mutiny on the Bounty | William Brown | |
| 1965 | The Sound of Music | Max Detweiler | |
| 1965 | Clarence, the Cross-Eyed Lion | Rupert Rowbotham | |
| 1967 | The Adventures of Bullwhip Griffin | Quentin Bartlett | |
| 1973 | The Return of Charlie Chan | Andrew Kidder | TV movie |
| 1974 | Young Frankenstein | Herr Falkstein | |
| 1985 | The Hugga Bunch | Bookworm | TV movie, Voice, uncredited (final role) |

=== Television ===
| Year | Title | Role | Notes |
|---|---|---|---|
| 1952 | Schlitz Playhouse | | Episode: "A Quarter for Your Troubles" |
| 1954 | The Philco Television Playhouse | | Episode: "The King and Mrs. Candle" |
| 1955 | Producers' Showcase | | Episode: "The King and Mrs. Candle" |
| 1957 | Playhouse 90 | Stephen Spettigue | Episode: "Where's Charley?" |
| 1957 | Playhouse 90 | Muche | Episode: "Topaze" |
| 1958 | Playhouse 90 | The Accountant | Episode: "Heart of Darkness" |
| 1958 | Shirley Temple's Storybook | Prime Minister | Episode: "The Emperor's New Clothes" |
| 1959 | Lux Playhouse | Cedric | Episode: "This Will Do Nicely" |
| 1960 | General Electric Theater | Chancellor | Episode: "The Ugly Duckling" |
| 1960 | The Twilight Zone | Bartlett Finchley | Episode: "A Thing About Machines" |
| 1964 | Burke's Law | Julian Clarington | Episode: "Who Killed Jason Shaw?" |
| 1964 | The Dick Van Dyke Show | Edwin Carp | Episode: "The Return of Edwin Carp" |
| 1965 | The Man from U.N.C.L.E. | Mr. Hemingway | Episode: "The Mad, Mad Tea Party Affair" |
| 1966 | Laredo | Jonathon Pringle | Episode: "A Very Small Assignment" |
| 1967 | ABC Stage 67 | Whitey | Episode: "The Wide Open Door" |
| 1968 | Bewitched | Kenzu Mishimoto | Episode: "A Majority of Two" |
| 1969 | Bonanza | Malcolm the Magnificent | Episode: "The Lady and the Mountain Lion" |
| 1969 | It Takes a Thief | Blanton | Episode: "The Old Who Came in from the Spy" |
| 1971 | Lassie | Henry Newton | Episode: "The Flying Grandpa" |
| 1972 | McCloud | Edwin | Episode: "Fifth Man in a String Quartet" |
| 1973 | Love, American Style | Edward | Episode: "Love and the Impossible Gift" |
