= Kanamori =

Kanamori (written: 金森 "money/metal, forest", or 金守 "money/metal, protect") is a Japanese surname. Notable people with the surname include:

- Akihiro Kanamori (金森 晶洋, born 1948), Japanese-born American mathematician
- Hiroo Kanamori (金森 博雄, born 1936), Japanese seismologist
- Mayu Kanamori (金森 マユ, born 1963), Japanese-born Australian photographer
- Kanamori Nagachika (金森 長近, 1524–1608), Japanese samurai and daimyō
- Tokujiro Kanamori (金森 徳次郎, 1886–1959), Japanese politician
- Tomoya Kanamori (金守 智哉, born 1982), Japanese footballer

== See also ==
- Kanamori clan (金森氏, Kanamori-shi), Sengoku period Japanese clan
- Kanamori–McAloon theorem, mathematical logic theorem
