= Walter Kerr =

American writer and theatre critic (1913-1996)

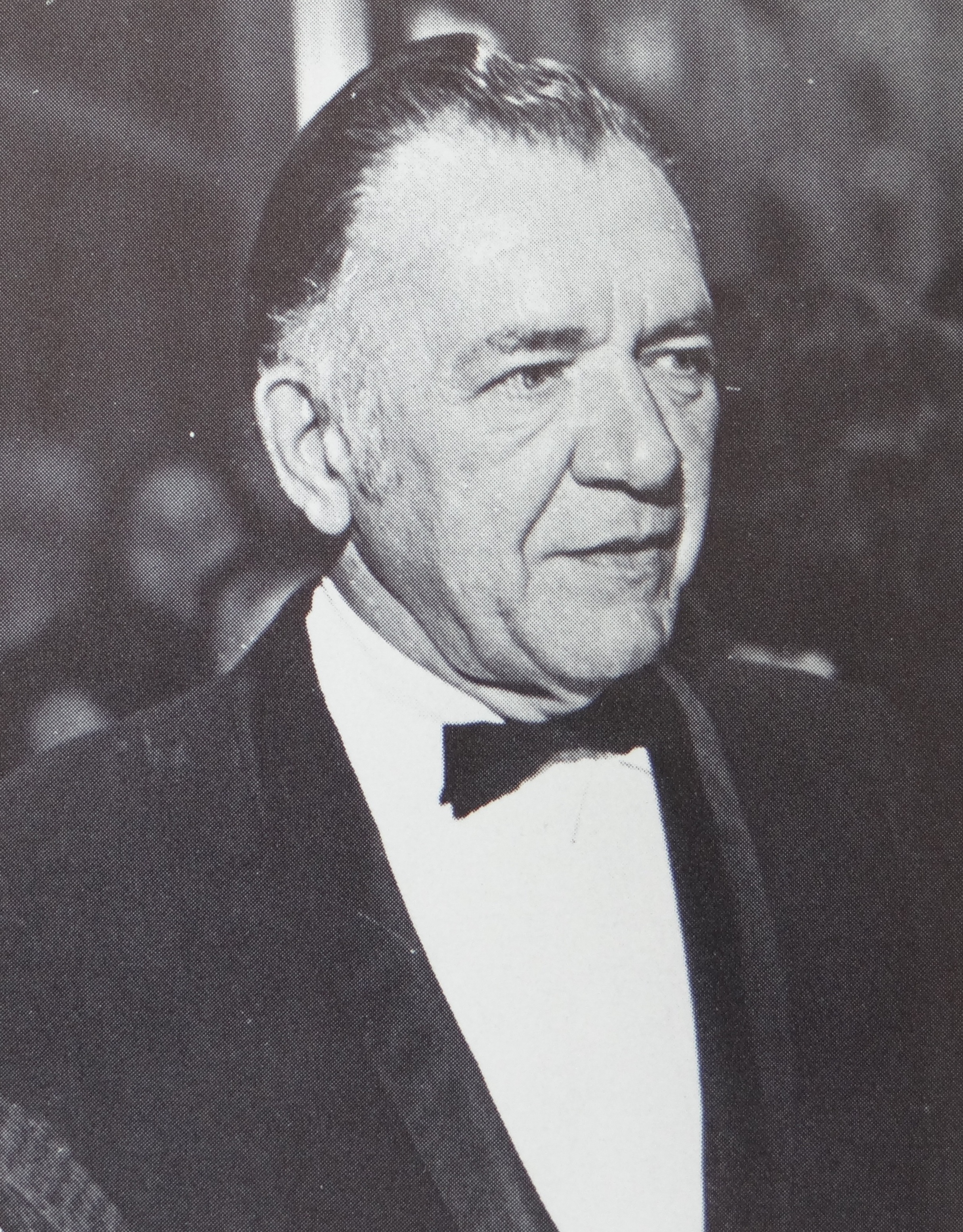
- Kerr in 1972
- Born: Walter Francis Kerr; July 8, 1913; Evanston, Illinois, U.S.
- Died: October 9, 1996 (aged 83); Dobbs Ferry, New York, U.S.
- Education: Northwestern University (BA, MA)
- Occupations: Theatre critic; playwright; director; lyricist
- Spouse: Jean Collins (m. 1943)
- Children: 6
- Writing career
- Notable awards: Pulitzer Prize

Walter Francis Kerr (July 8, 1913 – October 9, 1996) was an American writer and Broadway theatre critic. He also was the writer, lyricist, and/or director of several Broadway plays and musicals as well as the author of several books, generally on the subject of theater and cinema.

== Biography ==
Kerr was born in Evanston, Illinois, and earned both a B.A. and M.A. from Northwestern University, after graduation from St. George High School, also in Evanston.

He was a regular film critic for the St. George High School newspaper while a student there, and was also a critic for the Evanston News Index. He was the editor of the high school newspaper and yearbook. He taught speech and drama at The Catholic University of America.

After writing criticism for Commonweal he became a theater critic for the New York Herald Tribune in 1951. When that paper folded, he then began writing theater reviews for The New York Times in 1966, writing for the next seventeen years. During this time, Kerr lived in New Rochelle, New York in the same house Norman Rockwell had lived in.

He married fellow writer Jean Kerr (née Collins) on August 9, 1943. Together, they wrote the musical Goldilocks (1958), which won two Tony Awards. They also collaborated on Touch and Go (1949) and King of Hearts (1954). They had six children, one of whom was psychologist and author John Kerr.

Kerr died from congestive heart failure on October 9, 1996.

He was portrayed pseudonymously by David Niven in the 1960 film Please Don't Eat the Daisies, based on Jean Kerr's best-selling collection of humorous essays.

== Critiquing shows ==
Kerr was one of the harshest New York theatre critics of his era, giving the fewest favorable reviews. He was well known for panning musicals that were musically ambitious.

Though he is credited with a short and harsh review of, "No Leica," for John Van Druten's I Am a Camera in the New York Herald Tribune on November 29, 1951, the phrase does not appear in the article. In fact his review was largely positive. The origin of the quip is in a syndicated gossip column by Walter Winchell quoting humorist Goodman Ace.

=== Stephen Sondheim ===
Many of the shows he critiqued were those of Stephen Sondheim. About Sondheim's Company, Kerr wrote that it was too cold, cynical and distant for his taste, though he "admitted to admiring large parts of the show."

About Sondheim's Follies, he wrote " 'Follies' is intermissionless and exhausting, an extravaganza that becomes tedious for two simple reasons: Its extravagances have nothing to do with its pebble of a plot; and the plot, which could be wrapped up in approximately two songs, dawdles through 22 before it declares itself done... Mr. Sondheim may be too much a man of the seventies, too present-tense sophisticated... The effort to bind it up inhibits the crackling, open-ended, restlessly varied surges of sound he devised with such distinction for Company."

He praised A Little Night Music, writing that "The score is a gift, the ladies are delightful, and producer Harold Prince has staged the moody meetings with easy skill."

He expressed mixed sentiments about Sweeney Todd: The Demon Barber of Fleet Street, praising the music but deeming it too lilting for the show's grisly subject; his conclusion- "What is this musical about?" He wrote a follow-up article on his observation that the musical contained a plot from Molière's The School for Wives, posing the question who, of all of the authors who had revised the tale of Sweeney Todd over the years, had put the plot into the story.

Nevertheless, in 1977, he wrote of Sondheim "I needn't tell you that Stephen Sondheim is, both musically and lyrically, the most sophisticated composer now working for the Broadway theater."

=== Leonard Bernstein ===
In reviewing Leonard Bernstein's West Side Story he focused on the dancing: "the most savage, restless, electrifying dance patterns we've been exposed to in a dozen seasons... The dancing is it. Don't look for laughter or—for that matter—tears."

In his review of the original 1956 Broadway production of Candide, he wrote that it was a "really spectacular disaster". However, in reviewing the 1973 revival of Candide he wrote that it was a "most satisfying resurrection. [...] 'Candide' may at last have stumbled into the best of all possible productions... The show is now a carousel and we are on it quite safely... The design of the unending chase is so firm, the performers are so secure in their climbing and tumbling...that we are able to join the journey and still see it with the detachment that Voltaire prescribes."

=== Frank Loesser ===
Of Frank Loesser's "musical with a lot of music" [sic. opera], The Most Happy Fella he wrote: "the evening at the Imperial is finally heavy with its own inventiveness, weighted down with the variety and fulsomeness of a genuinely creative appetite. It's as though Mr. Loesser had written two complete musicals—the operetta and the haymaker—on the same simple play and then crammed them both into a single structure."

=== Other criticism ===
Kerr was also notable for his lack of enthusiasm for the plays of Samuel Beckett. For instance, of Beckett's Waiting For Godot he wrote "The play, asking for a thousand readings, has none of its own to give. It is a veil rather than a revelation. It wears a mask rather than a face."

== Awards and honors ==
Walter Kerr won a Pulitzer Prize for Criticism in 1978 for "articles on the theater".

In 1983, Kerr was inducted into the American Theater Hall of Fame.

In 1990, the former Ritz Theater on West 48th Street in the Theater District, New York was renamed the Walter Kerr Theatre in his honor.

== Works ==
Books (selected)

- Criticism and Censorship (1954)
- How Not to Write a Play (1955)
- Pieces at Eight (1958)
- The Decline of Pleasure (1962)
- The Theatre in Spite of Itself (1963)
- Tragedy and Comedy (1967)
- Thirty Plays Hath November (1969)
- God on the Gymnasium Floor (1971)
- The Silent Clowns (1975)
- Journey to the Center of the Theater (1979)

Broadway

- Count Me In 1942 musical – wrote book
- Sing Out, Sweet Land 1944 musical revue – wrote book and directed book
- The Song of Bernadette 1946 play – wrote book with Jean Kerr and directed
- Touch and Go 1949 musical revue – wrote sketches and lyrics with Jean Kerr and directed
- King of Hearts 1954 play – directed (written by Jean Kerr and Eleanor Brooke)
- Goldilocks 1958 musical – wrote book and lyrics with Jean Kerr and Joan Ford (lyrics) and directed

Other

- Miss Calypso – a Maya Angelou album that Kerr produced
- Stardust (1946) wrote (comedy), presented at the Catholic University, Washington, DC under the title Art and Prudence

== Notes ==
- Miletich, Leo N. Broadway's prize-winning musicals (1993), Haworth Press, ISBN 1-56024-288-4
