= Thomas Fitzgerald (composer) =

Australian composer conductor

Dr Thomas Fitzgerald is an Australian composer, musical director, conductor and musician.

Thomas Fitzgerald, violin and bow

Thomas Fitzgerald completed his Doctoral Thesis in Composition at the University of Wollongong in 2005. He also holds a Master of Music and Bachelor of Music (Hons) from Melbourne University. A graduate student of Indiana University and New York City, he returned to Australia after a period of study and professional activity in the USA. Educational appointments have included sessional lecturer at Melbourne University, Scotch College, Melbourne Grammar, M.L.C. Kew and Wesley College.

Thomas has composed a diverse range of music works Concert and Musical Theatre Events, electronic broadcast media and for Film and Television. These include productions with Patrick White for the A.B.C., and award-winning scores for ABC Television Natural History Film Unit. He has scored for Feature Films and Multi Media projects, including Snapshot, Stanley and The Good Cook and was nominated for an Academy Award in 1999 for his film score in Turtle World.

== Concert performances ==
Thomas Fitzgerald's concert performances include working with well-known artists such as Elton John, Dionne Warwick, Sting, James Taylor, Nancy Wilson, and Sammy Davis Jr., as well as Melbourne and Sydney Symphony Orchestras and contemporary ensembles on violin. Thomas has worked extensively in New York City, on Broadway for musicals, such as Evita, in recording studios, and in contemporary music Concerts.

== Musical Director ==
Thomas has conducted Symphony Orchestras and directed productions for The State Orchestra of Victoria, The ABC Queensland Symphony Orchestra, and Chamber Orchestra Ensembles in Australia & the United States. He has directed/conducted several major television broadcast, live Concert Events for Melbourne International Arts Festival, the Channel 7 Christmas Concert & Moomba. Musical Theatre Production credits include Les Misérables in Australia, as Conductor/assistant Musical Director/Orchestra Leader, and The Phantom of the Opera as musical consultant.

== Composer and Musical Director ==
Australian projects include Composer and musical director for The Opening Ceremony, Melbourne International Festival of Arts, and creating music and sound design for major Television Advertising Commercials. As director of One Earth Orchestra, Thomas has brought together an exciting new Australian music ensemble of eighteen (plus) musicians, that workshop and perform the new works of International and Australian composers, such as Steve Reich, Stephen Ingham, David Baker, Keith Humble, Peter Sculthorpe and Thomas Fitzgerald. The expressive style blends contemporary electric sounds, orchestral and tribal textures, frequently incorporating improvisation within scored sections of material, spoken word, and collaboration with multimedia artists.

Thomas composed the music for Chika, a documentary performance created by Mayu Kanamori. The ABC Radio National program of Chika was a finalist in the Radio Feature, Documentary or Broadcast Special category of the 2004 Walkley Awards for Excellence in Journalism.

Thomas was awarded the ABC Radio Arts/Australia Council New Media Artist in residence for 2005 and a Peggy Glanville Hicks Composer Fellowship. Shower Songs – Canaries in the Mineshafts, a radiophonic musical composition created during the composer's residency premiered on ABC Radio National networks in December 2005. In 2007, he was appointed a trustee of The Peggy Glanville-Hicks Composers' House.

And the Music Caught Fire: The Rebirth of Irish Music – 'The Awakening' and 'The Roaring Tiger', two programs exploring the renaissance of Irish Music presented by Thomas Fitzgerald and Siobhan McHugh were broadcast in March 2007 on ABC Radio National.

Thomas Fitzgerald's recent project, The Peacesong Tapestries, was broadcast on SBS Radio World View. The 23-week program culminated with a concert, which showcased the songs of peace created for the program as part of the Harmony Day 2008 celebrations in Sydney.

- Works (selected)
  - Sonic Code
  - Endless Flight
  - Fast Travel
  - Blues for the Avant Garde
  - Double rainbow
  - Reconciliation Symphony
  - Heliotrope
- Multimedia performance
  - The Heart of the journey
  - CHIKA
  - Counter memory and The Irish Linen Memorial
  - Avalanche
- Film / TV
  - Snapshot
  - Stanley
  - The Good Cook (1997)
  - Turtle World (1996)
  - Pa (2001)
  - Wildscreen (1996)
- Opera / Theatre
  - The Three Tenants
  - Child Support – 110 Bed Nights
  - Midsummer Nights Dream
- Festivals
  - River Spectacular – Melbourne Moomba Festival
  - Channel 7 Christmas Concert with the City of Melbourne
  - Lighting up Flinders Street Station – Opening Night Ceremony for Melbourne International Festival of Arts
- Radio
  - Patrick White
  - Shower Songs – Canaries in the Mineshafts
  - And the Music Caught Fire: The Rebirth of Irish Music
  - Chika
  - The Peace Song Tapestries
  - Marrying Out: composed the music for this award-winning two-part series produced by Siobhan McHugh and broadcast on ABC Radio National 2009
- Recordings
  - 'CHIKA' soundtrack {Thomas Fitzgerald 2008} Thomas Fitzgerald (Violin/Keyboards), Satsuki Odamura (Koto), Anne Norman (Shakuhachi), Toshinori Sakamoto (Taiko Drums)
  - Spirit {Thomas Fitzgerald 1997} One Earth Orchestra
  - Short cuts : Chitter chatter (Thomas Fitzgerald 2003)
  - Platypus Dreaming {Thomas Fitzgerald producer}
  - String of Pearls : Deborah Conway : Tom Fitzgerald—violin
  - Wave : Rosie Westbrook : Tom Fitzgerald—violin
  - peter schaefer ensemble : Tom Fitzgerald—violin / string quartet leader
  - Heliotrope : Geoff Pressing : Tom Fitzgerald—Soundtracks and Music
  - Billy Miller Victoria : Tom Fitzgerald—violin
- Grants & Awards
  - Pa – Best Original Music Award, 2002 Sienna International Festival. Best short film at Venice Film Festival 2002
  - Midsummer Nights Dream – Melbourne Theatre Critics Award for Best Musical Composition & Direction.
  - Turtle World – Film score nominated for an Academy Award in 1999
  - Chika – The ABC Radio National program of "Chika" was a finalist in the Radio Feature, Documentary or Broadcast Special category of the 2004 Walkley Awards for **Excellence in Journalism.
  - ABC Radio Arts/Australia Council New Media Artist-in-Residence for 2005
  - Peggy Glanville Hicks Composer Fellowship 2005

== External references ==
- Thomas Fitzgerald's website (archived version)
