= Wanda Hendrix =

American actress (1928–1981)

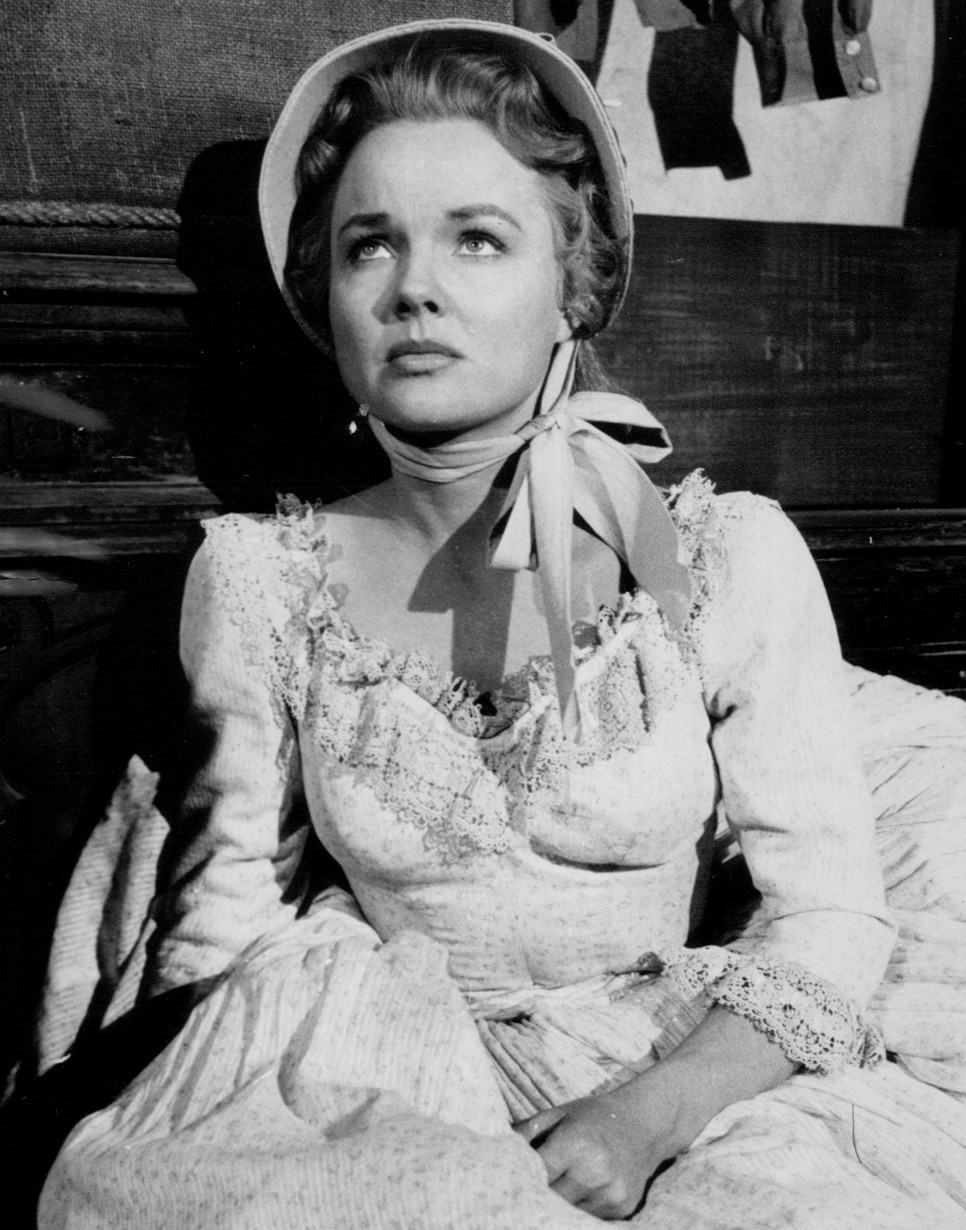
- in Wagon Train, 1958
- Born: Dixie Wanda Hendrix; November 3, 1928; Jacksonville, Florida, U.S.
- Died: February 1, 1981 (aged 52); Burbank, California, U.S.
- Burial place: Forest Lawn Memorial Park, Hollywood Hills, California, U.S.
- Occupation: Actress
- Years active: 1945–1972
- Spouse(s): Audie Murphy (m. 1949; div. 1951) Jim Stack (m. 1954; div. 1958) Steve LaMonte (m. 1969; div. 1980)

Dixie Wanda Hendrix (November 3, 1928 – February 1, 1981) was an American film and television actress.

== Early life ==
Dixie Wanda Hendrix was born on November 3, 1928 in Jacksonville, Florida. Her father was a logging foreman. She was performing in a school play in Jacksonville when she was seen by a talent agent who took her to Warner Bros in Los Angeles. Her parents moved with her to California, buying a ranch there. She graduated from University High School in Los Angeles.

== Career ==
Hendrix made her first film, Confidential Agent, in 1945 at the age of 16, and for the first few years of her career was consistently cast in B movies. By the late 1940s, she was being included in more prestigious films, such as Ride the Pink Horse (1947) and Miss Tatlock's Millions (1948). She starred with Tyrone Power in Prince of Foxes (1949).

Following her second marriage, in 1954, Hendrix essentially retired from films, though she worked in live television dramatic anthology shows such as Pulitzer Prize Playhouse, Robert Montgomery Presents, The Plymouth Playhouse, The Ford Television Theatre, The Revlon Mirror Theater, and Schlitz Playhouse, and occasionally appeared in later series such as Bat Masterson, My Three Sons, Wagon Train, and Bewitched.

== Personal life ==
From 1946, Hendrix dated Audie Murphy, a highly decorated World War II hero. Her agent got him an early small film role. The couple was married in 1949, but divorced in 1951.

On June 26, 1954, Hendrix married wealthy sportsman James Langford Stack, Jr., the brother of actor Robert Stack. They divorced on November 3, 1958.

She married Italian financier and oil company executive Steven LaMonte on June 7, 1969; they divorced on November 17, 1980.

== Death ==
Hendrix died on February 1, 1981, in Burbank, California, from double pneumonia, aged 52, and was interred at Forest Lawn Cemetery in Los Angeles.

== Partial filmography ==
- Confidential Agent (1945) as Else
- Nora Prentiss (1947) as Bonita Talbot
- Welcome Stranger (1947) as Emily Walters
- Hollywood Wonderland (1947 short) as Tour Guide (uncredited)
- Variety Girl (1947) (uncredited)
- Ride the Pink Horse (1947) as Pila
- My Own True Love (1948) as Sheila Heath
- Miss Tatlock's Millions (1948) as Nan Tatlock
- Song of Surrender (1949) as Abigail Hunt
- Prince of Foxes (1949) as Camilla
- Captain Carey, U.S.A. (1950) as Giulia [de Cresci] de Greffi
- Sierra (1950) as Riley Martin
- The Admiral Was a Lady (1950) as Jean Madison
- Saddle Tramp (1950) as Della
- The Highwayman (1951) as Bess Forsythe
- My Outlaw Brother (1951) as Señorita Carmelita Alvarado
- Montana Territory (1952) as Clair Enoch
- South of Algiers (1953) as Anne Burnet
- The Last Posse (1953) as Deborah Morley
- Sea of Lost Ships (1953) as Pat Kirby
- Highway Dragnet (1954) as Susan
- The Black Dakotas (1954) as Ruth Lawrence
- The Boy Who Caught a Crook (1961) as Laura
- Johnny Cool (1963) as Miss Connolly
- Stage to Thunder Rock (1964) as Mrs. Swope
- The Oval Portrait (1972) as Lisa Buckingham
