= My Outlaw Brother =

1951 film by Elliott Nugent

- Theatrical release poster
- Directed by: Elliott Nugent
- Written by: Gene Fowler Jr. (screenplay); Alfred Lewis Levitt (additional dialogue); Max Brand (book South of the Rio Grande)
- Produced by: Benedict Bogeaus (producer); Mickey Rooney (executive producer)
- Starring: Mickey Rooney; Wanda Hendrix; Robert Preston; Robert Stack
- Cinematography: José Ortiz Ramos
- Edited by: George Crone
- Music by: Manuel Esperón
- Production company: Benedict Bogeaus Production
- Distributed by: Eagle-Lion Classics
- Release date: August 22, 1951 (New York)
- Running time: 82 minutes
- Country: United States
- Language: English

My Outlaw Brother is a 1951 American Western film directed by Elliott Nugent, produced by Benedict Bogeaus and starring Mickey Rooney, Wanda Hendrix, Robert Preston and Robert Stack. Filmed in Mexico and released through Eagle-Lion Classics, the film is based on the book South of the Rio Grande by Max Brand and is also known as My Brother, the Outlaw.

== Plot ==
Denny O'Moore, an Irish lad from New York, has not seen big brother Patrick for eight years. Patrick is said to now own a silver mine in Mexico and sends welcome money to his family in America.

In the town of Border City, Texas, a dangerous Mexican killer known as El Tigre and his gang rob a bank. Law-enforcement agents who have attempted to infiltrate El Tigre's gang all have been killed or have disappeared. Their representative approaches the Texas Rangers with a plan: if a Ranger can bring Patrick O'Moore, who has become El Tigre's right-hand man, back to the United States, he might betray El Tigre for money and amnesty. Ranger Joe Warder is assigned to bring O'Moore across the border. Denny wants to travel with him, but Joe refuses.

On the trail, bandits attack Denny but he is saved by Joe. Discovering that Denny's brother is the man whom he is pursuing, Joe teams with Denny and they ride together to San Clemente, Mexico, where Patrick resides. Denny discovers a woman there named Carmelita Alvarado whom Patrick loves but wants nothing to do with him.

Denny is seized by El Tigre's men, but Patrick saves him. Patrick tells the men that he has no brother but orders his men not to harm Danny and to return him to the United States. Patrick later finds Denny and tells him that he owes his life to El Tigre, who once saved him.

After being held captive, Denny, Joe and Carmelita flee. A friend who helps them escape is killed by El Tigre, who attacks Denny with a machete, and Joe shoots him. El Tigre is revealed to be Patrick in disguise.

The Americans ride home and Carmelita goes along with Denny.

== Cast ==
- Mickey Rooney as J. Dennis "Denny" O'Moore
- Wanda Hendrix as Señorita Carmelita Alvarado
- Robert Preston as Joe Warder
- Robert Stack as Patrick O'Moore
- José Torvay as Enrique Ortiz
- Carlos Múzquiz as Col. Sanchez (El Capitan)
- Hilda Moreno as Señora Alvarado
- Fernando Wagner as Burger

== Reception ==
In a contemporary review for The New York Times, critic A. H. Weiler wrote: "As the New York tenderfoot, who is finally made aware of the fact that the scourge of the border is none other than the handsome gent he has been worshipping, Mr. Rooney is about as convincing as the Mexican sombreros he wears. On him they do not look good. However. it must be pointed out that he is energetic in his assignment."

== See also ==
- List of American films of 1951
