= Paul West (radio and television writer) =

Paul West (August 27, 1911 – June 15, 1998) was an American writer who penned works for radio and television. He should not be confused with the American playwright and screenwriter Paul West (1871–1918) or the British-born American novelist, essayist, and poet Paul West (1930–2015).

== Life and career ==
Born in David City, Nebraska, Paul West began his career as a writer for CBS Radio; initially working out of the company's station in Hollywood in the mid-1930s. He was an early member of the Radio Writers Guild, and in his early career in Hollywood he wrote scripts for the radio anthology series Lux Radio Theatre, the soap opera Sally of the Star, and scripts for comedian W.C. Fields.

After meeting his future wife Phyllis Loudon during a trip to San Francisco, West relocated to that city and joined the writing staff of KSFO. He returned to CBS Radio in Hollywood when he was appointed head writer of The Billie Burke Show. He went on to write for several other successful radio programs, including The Adventures of Ozzie and Harriet, Stars over Hollywood, The Great Gildersleeve, and Father Knows Best among others.

With the rise of television in the 1950s, West's writing career transferred to that medium; including continuing to write for Father Knows Best when it made the switch from radio to TV. For his writing on that program he was nominated for the Primetime Emmy Award for Outstanding Writing for a Comedy Series in 1958. Other 1950s television programs he wrote for included Amos 'n' Andy, The Red Skelton Show, Dennis the Menace, and The Real McCoys. From 1962 to 1965 he was a lead writer for The Donna Reed Show. His later television credits included writing for Please Don't Eat the Daisies, I Dream of Jeannie, The Brady Bunch, Nanny and the Professor, The Magical World of Disney, My Three Sons, Marcus Welby, M.D., The New Scooby-Doo Movies, and Grandpa Goes to Washington. He ended his career writing for The Waltons.

In addition to his work for radio and television, West was the author of the screenplay for the 1969 film Hang Your Hat on the Wind.

Paul West died on June 15, 1998, in San Anselmo, California at the age of 86.
