= How Not to Write a Play =

1955 book by Walter Kerr

- Author: Walter Kerr
- Genre: Non-fiction
- Publisher: Simon & Schuster
- Publication date: 1955

How Not to Write a Play is a 1955 non-fiction book written by Walter Kerr, one time chief theatre critic for the New York Times. The first edition was published by Simon & Schuster. The basis of How Not to Write a Play was an article Kerr wrote for Harper's Magazine.

== Summary ==
How Not to Write a Play examines negative trends that Kerr perceived in playwriting. Kerr offers insights both into the practice and finances of contemporary theatre, blaming the declining audience on the poor and un-entertaining fare being put before the public by both commercial and institutional producers.

In particular, he blames decades of slavish imitation of Henrik Ibsen and Anton Chekhov, not only because their styles had become hackneyed and arthritic (Ibsen, himself, had abandoned "Ibsenism" after only a decade), but because they were created by and for an intelligentsia, and no thriving theatrical culture has ever been built that way, citing the case of William Shakespeare vs. the school of John Lyly, among others.

He asserts that plays will always be more successful if they are highly entertaining, and argues that that entertainment can be at once enjoyable and artistically sophisticated. He also calls for a return to verse, pointing out Christopher Fry as an example of a new and supple 20th-century theatrical verse style.

== Reception ==
Reviewer George David recommended the book to readers who wondered why theater had fallen in popularity and described Kerr's book as "pungent, revealing, brilliant". A review in The Virginian-Pilot disagreed with Kerr's contention that plays should make more use of verse-form and felt that Kerr's discussion of imitation versus identity was muddled, but agreed with the point that theater should be entertaining.

Elizabeth McSherry, reviewing for the Hartford Courant, noted that the number of theatrical productions in New York had fallen from 224 in 1929 to 70 in 1955, which How Not to Write a Play blames on modern playwrights, and declared that the book was "stimulating and provocative".

In his diary, Noël Coward wrote of the book, "Quite a lot of it is intelligent and well-written but the net result is sterile." Time editor Henry A. Grunwald consulted How Not to Write a Play when he attempted to write a play.

Decades later, How Not to Write a Play is still referenced in books about writing, critiquing, and teaching drama.
