= Please Don't Eat the Daisies (TV series) =

Television series

- Genre: Sitcom
- Starring: Patricia Crowley; Mark Miller
- Composer: Jeff Alexander
- Country of origin: United States
- Original language: English
- No. of seasons: 2
- No. of episodes: 58

Production
- Producers: Robert Stambler; Paul West
- Camera setup: Multi-camera
- Running time: 24 min (30 minutes with commercials)
- Production company: Metro-Goldwyn-Mayer Television

Original release
- Network: NBC
- Release: September 14, 1965 – April 22, 1967

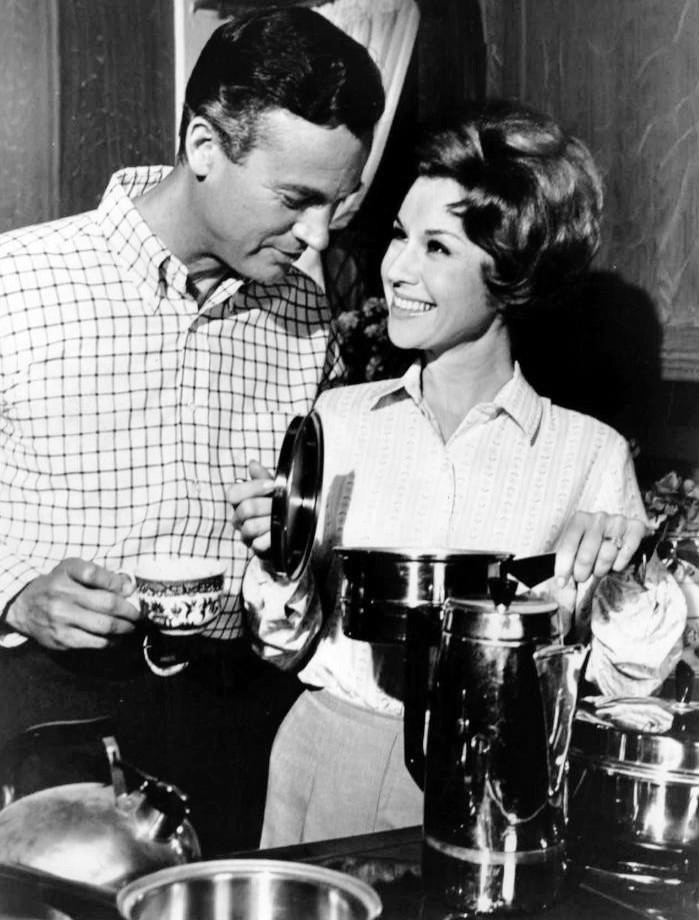
Mark Miller and Patricia Crowley as Jim and Joan Nash.

Please Don't Eat the Daisies is an American sitcom that aired on NBC from September 14, 1965, to September 2, 1967. The series is based on the 1957 book by Jean Kerr and the 1960 film starring Doris Day and David Niven.

The series ran for 58 half-hour episodes and starred Patricia Crowley and Mark Miller. The show also features Dub Taylor, Clint Howard, Bonnie Franklin and Ellen Corby in recurring appearances. Robert Vaughn and David McCallum appear in the first-season episode "Say UNCLE" as Napoleon Solo and Illya Kuryakin from The Man from U.N.C.L.E., while Stefanie Powers appears as April Dancer from The Girl from U.N.C.L.E. in a second-season episode. Patricia Crowley had appeared in the pilot episode of The Man from U.N.C.L.E.

== Synopsis ==
Joan and Jim Nash are a married couple who live in an old, turreted house in Ridgemont, New York, with their four rambunctious sons (Kyle, Joel, and identical twins Trevor and Tracy), a very tolerant live-in maid, and an enormous Old English Sheepdog named Ladadog. Jim is a college English professor. Joan—who abhors everything having to do with homemaking and housework—is a freelance newspaper columnist whose columns focus on the humorous side of family life. Joan tries to keep things organized, but her family can be demanding. Chaos regularly breaks out, and the antics of the boys, the dog, her husband and the neighbors, as well as her own indifference to domestic chores, give her plenty of inspiration for her column, much to Jim's embarrassment.

== Cast ==
- Pat Crowley as Joan Nash
- Mark Miller as Jim Nash
- Kim Tyler as Kyle Nash
- Brian Nash as Joel Nash
- Jeff Fithian as Trevor Nash
- Joe Fithian as Tracy Nash
- Shirley Mitchell as Marge Thornton
- King Donovan as Herb Thornton
- Dub Taylor as Ed Hewley
- Ned Glass as Mr. Hastings
- Jeanne Arnold as Mrs. Podesta
- Bill Quinn as Dean Carter
- Bonnie Franklin as Dorie

== Broadcast history ==
In its first season, the show did fairly well in the ratings. It was scheduled on Tuesday nights opposite the second half of two veteran series on prime-time television, Rawhide on CBS and Combat! on ABC. In its second season, Please Don't Eat the Daisies was moved to Saturday nights, where it faced strong competition against the second half of The Jackie Gleason Show. The ratings fell, and NBC canceled the series in spring 1967.

== Episode list ==
=== Season 1: (1965–66) ===
No. overall	No. in season	Title	Directed by	Written by	Original release date
1	1	"My Eldest Child"	Jerry Thorpe	Jerry Thorpe	September 14, 1965
Joan writes a newspaper article that she believes will not have her name on it. Everyone in town finds out her secret identity, and she gets in trouble with Jim, who is not as amused by what she wrote as the rest of the town. This is the only black-and-white episode of the series.
2	2	"How About Two Gorillas?"	Howard Morris	Paul West	September 21, 1965
Jim and Joan volunteer at the school variety show. To their dismay, the other volunteers are all professional entertainers.
3	3	"Who's Kicking That Gong Around?"	Jeffrey Hayden	Mary Loos & Richard Sale	September 28, 1965
To avoid the household chaos, Joan retreats to the house's bell tower to write. While she's up there, someone removes the ladder, leaving her stranded.
4	4	"Dinner on the Rocks"	Jeffrey Hayden	Lee Erwin	October 5, 1965
A kitchen catastrophe erupts when Joan fixes a meal for Jim's faculty friends.
5	5	"We're Bigger Than They Are, But..."	Jeffrey Hayden	Bill Freedman & Ben Gershman	October 12, 1965
No one at school or home can tell the twins apart, a fact that the twins use to good advantage.
6	6	"Look Who's Talking"	Peter Baldwin	Robert Stambler	October 19, 1965
The boys start spreading the word that their mother is pregnant.
7	7	"The Big Train"	David Alexander	Lee Erwin	October 26, 1965
The Nashes learn that a strange thunderstorm strikes every 10 years, causing someone to disappear.
8	8	"Two Seats on the Moon Shot"	David Alexander	Paul West	November 2, 1965
A man in a restaurant offers Joan an expense-paid trip to New York City.
9	9	"Shape Up or Ship Out"	Peter Baldwin	Bill Freedman & Bill Gershman	November 9, 1965
Trouble ensues when Joan puts Joel in charge of the twins.
10	10	"Somewhere George is Calling"	Jeffrey Hayden	Bill Everett	November 16, 1965
To raise money for gifts, Kyle and Joel conduct tours through their old, turreted house.
11	11	"Don't Fool Around with the Man Upstairs"	Peter Baldwin	Paul West	November 23, 1965
Joel feels guilty when he goes to a carnival instead of Sunday school.
12	12	"Of Hitches and Stitches and Big Round Dogs"	Gary Nelson	Paul West	November 30, 1965
Joan tries to make her sister-in-law's wedding a big success.
13	13	"Very, Very Huckleberry"	Peter Baldwin	Paul West	December 7, 1965
Joan panics when the boys plan to go to sea on a rickety raft.
14	14	"It's Lad by a Nose"	Ezra Stone	Ann Marcus	December 14, 1965
Ladadog's future looks bleak when Joel's allergy is traced to dogs.
15	15	"The Big Brass Blonde"	Jeffrey Hayden	Paul West	December 21, 1965
Nerves are on edge as Joan and Jim await a movie star's appraisal of Joan's play. Guest star: Audrey Meadows
16	16	"Swing That Indian Club"	Sidney Miller	Bill Everett	December 28, 1965
Joan plays hostess for Kyle's club, unaware that Kyle wants to quit.
17	17	"The Pied Piper of Ridgemont"	John Erman	Story by : Sidney A. Mandel, Teleplay by : Sidney A. Mandel & Paul West	January 4, 1966
Things go awry when Joan's father pays a visit after seven years in Africa.
18	18	"Say UNCLE"	Alvin Ganzer	Sidney Morse & Roy Kammerman	January 11, 1966
The twins are convinced that their father is a secret agent. Guest stars: Robert Vaughn and David McCallum as Napoleon Solo and Illya Kuryakin
19	19	"Nobody's Perfect"	Peter Baldwin	Arne Sultan	January 18, 1966
Jim lands in jail after Joan forgets to pay a parking ticket.
20	20	"My Good Friend, Whatsisname"	Alvin Ganzer	Paul West	January 25, 1966
Jim tries to recall the name of the school friend he invited to dinner.
21	21	"The Monster in the Basement"	Peter Baldwin	Paul West	February 1, 1966
The Nashes frantically try to fix their temperamental furnace before a college-board VIP visits.
22	22	"Wring Out the Welcome Mat"	Gary Nelson	David C. Bruce	February 15, 1966
A leaky roof convinces the Nashes that their house is a white elephant.
23	23	"Move Over, Mozart"	Tay Garnett	Marlene Fanta Shyer	February 22, 1966
Joan tries to guide Joel's musical career after she learns he has an unusual aptitude for music
24	24	"Who's Walking Under the Bed?"	Sidney Miller	Paul West	March 8, 1966
Nerves are on edge as Jim's request for a raise goes to Dean Carter.
25	25	"How Now, Hausfrau?"	John Erman	Paul West	March 15, 1966
A reputation-destroying newspaper columnist wants to interview Joan.
26	26	"Big Man on Campus"	Tay Garnett	Robert Stambler	March 22, 1966
Joan tries to keep Jim from reading her unfinished play.
27	27	"The Magnificent Muldoon"	David Alexander	Mark Miller	March 29, 1966
The twins invite a hobo to dinner on the same night Jim is entertaining his boss. Guest star: Burgess Meredith
28	28	"The Leaning Tower of Ridgemont"	David Alexander	Joseph C. & Carol Cavella	April 5, 1966
The Nashes face eviction when a building inspector condemns their house.
29	29	"Mine is the Luck of the Irish"	Richard Whorf	Robert Stambler	April 12, 1966
Joan's father tries to get the Nashes to invest in a uranium mine.
30	30	"Night of Knights"	Richard Whorf	Story by : Paul West, Teleplay by : Paul West & Robert Stambler	April 19, 1966
Jim's drama class tries to make his birthday a memorable day.

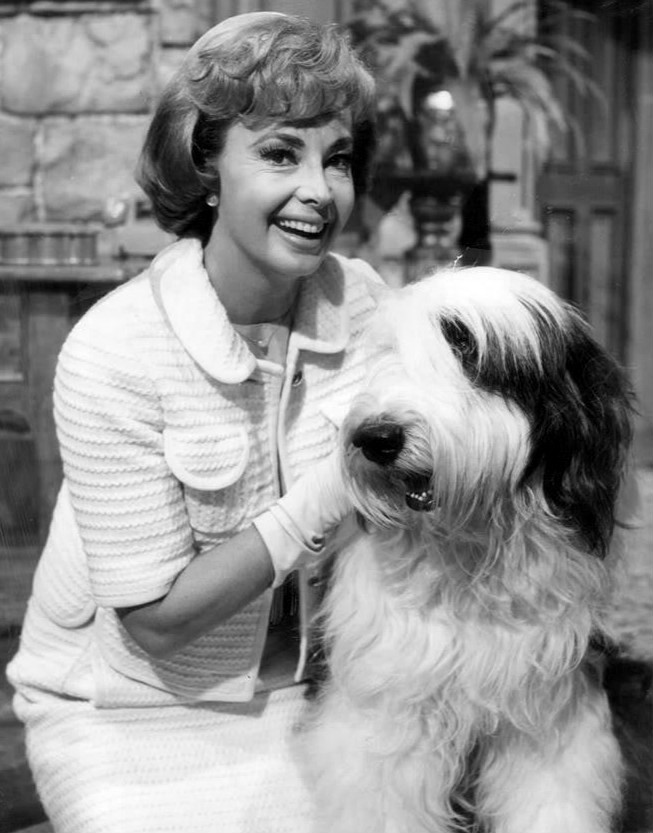
Guest star Audrey Meadows in the Season One episode "The Big Brass Blonde" in 1965.

=== Season 2: (1966–67) ===
No. overall	No. in season	Title	Directed by	Written by	Original release date
31	1	"The Purple Avenger"	Richard Kinon	Allan Manings & Milt Rosen	September 17, 1966
The twins brag about their "in" with a television hero whom Joan dated.
32	2	"My Mother's Name is Fred"	David Alexander	Jack Raymond	September 24, 1966
Complications arise when Joan sells a story to a girlie magazine.
33	3	"A-Hunting We Will Go"	Richard Kinon	Peggy Elliott & Ed Scharlach	October 1, 1966
Jim is faced with the task of entertaining a visiting sportsman.
34	4	"At Home with the Family"	Hollingsworth Morse	Michael Morris	October 8, 1966
Confusion reigns as the Nashes prepare to appear on a TV program.
35	5	"The Holdouts"	John Erman	Jack Raymond	October 15, 1966
The boys try to wangle a cut of the money Joan received for an article about their antics.
36	6	"Trouble Right Here in Ridgemont"	David Alexander	Austin Kalish & Irma Kalish	October 22, 1966
Joan and Marge both claim ownership of a winning raffle ticket.
37	7	"Black is the Color of My Love's Eye"	John Erman	Sidney A. Mandel & Roy Kammerman	October 29, 1966
A neighborhood girl gives Joel a black eye.
38	8	"My Son, the Genius"	John Erman	Michael Adams (aka Meyer Dolinsky)	November 5, 1966
Joel's unusual IQ score leads the Nashes to believe he's a budding genius.
39	9	"The End of the Trailer"	Hollingsworth Morse	Elliot Robin	November 12, 1966
Jim tries to discourage Dean Carter from buying his trailer, which is a lemon.
40	10	"My Son, the Actor"	Herbert Coleman	Milton Pascal	November 19, 1966
The Nashes try to find out if their sons have acting abilities.
41	11	"Of Haunted Houses, Little Boys, and a Ghost Named Malcolm"	Hollingsworth Morse	Story by : Stanley H. Silverman and Jay E. Selby (aka Robert Lees), Teleplay by : William Cowley	November 26, 1966
A drifter secretly takes up residence in the Nash house.
42	12	"And What Does Your Husband Do?"	Bruce Bilson	William Cowley	December 3, 1966
Jealousies surface after Joan is named Woman of the Year.
43	13	"Just for Laughs"	Bruce Bilson	Robert Stambler	December 10, 1966
A one-day Nash survival test illustrates how not to get mom's hand out of the garbage disposal.
44	14	"The Guardian"	John Erman	Michael Morris	December 24, 1966
At an auction, Joan tries to retrieve the twins' painting, which is glued to the family tax return.
45	15	"Peace, It's Wonderful"	Richard Kinon	Gene Thompson	January 7, 1967
Joan and Jim clash when they try to help Herb and Marge settle an argument.
46	16	"The Silent Butler Spoke"	Richard Kinon	William Cowley	January 14, 1967
Trouble begins when the Nashes hire a former thief. Guest star: Whit Bissell
47	17	"The Cupid Machine"	Michael D. Moore	William Cowley	January 21, 1967
Joan signs up with a computer dating service to research an article.
48	18	"The Thing's the Play"	Stanley Z. Cherry	Tom Adair & John Elliotte	January 28, 1967
Jim's reputation as a drama coach hangs in the balance when Joan's play is entered in a drama competition.
49	19	"The Officer of the Court"	Bruce Bilson	William Cowley	February 4, 1967
Herb the lawyer finds himself in a mess when he represents Jim and Joan in two different cases.
50	20	"None So Righteous"	Bruce Bilson	Robert Stambler	February 11, 1967
The Righteous Brothers join the Nashes in a parent-teacher association musical in which the Righteous Brothers sing "Along Came Jones" and Joan sings "Queen of the House."
51	21	"Remember Lake Serene?"	Don Appell	William Cowley	February 18, 1967
Joan and Marge plan a sneaky plot to marry off a bachelor friend. Guest star: Stefanie Powers as April Dancer
52	22	"Pest in the House"	Bruce Bilson	David Braverman & Bob Marcus	February 25, 1967
Disaster strikes when house guest Herb does his share of the chores.
53	23	"Help Wanted, Desperately"	Hollingsworth Morse	William Cowley	March 4, 1967
The Nashes have a problem when the new maid slows things down. Guest star: Mary Treen
54	24	"Just While You're Resting"	Bruce Bilson	William Cowley	March 11, 1967
Joan's new servant is all heart — and no help.
55	25	"When I Was a Young Man"	Bruce Bilson	Neil Travis	March 25, 1967
The Nashes recall the hectic early years of Joan and Jim's marriage.
56	26	"Professor, Please!"	Bruce Bilson	William Cowley	April 1, 1967
Joan and Jim clash when a mystery woman comes between them.
57	27	"A Matter of Concentration"	Bruce Bilson	William Cowley & Robert Stambler	April 8, 1967
Jim suffers from wounded pride after Joan buys gifts for everyone.
58	28	"The Day the Play Got Away"	Bruce Bilson	Ed Adamson	April 22, 1967
Jim's sabbatical begins an ordeal of self-doubt for him: He cannot concentrate on his writing, and his replacement has taken over his pet project.
