= Technophobia =

Fear or discomfort with technology

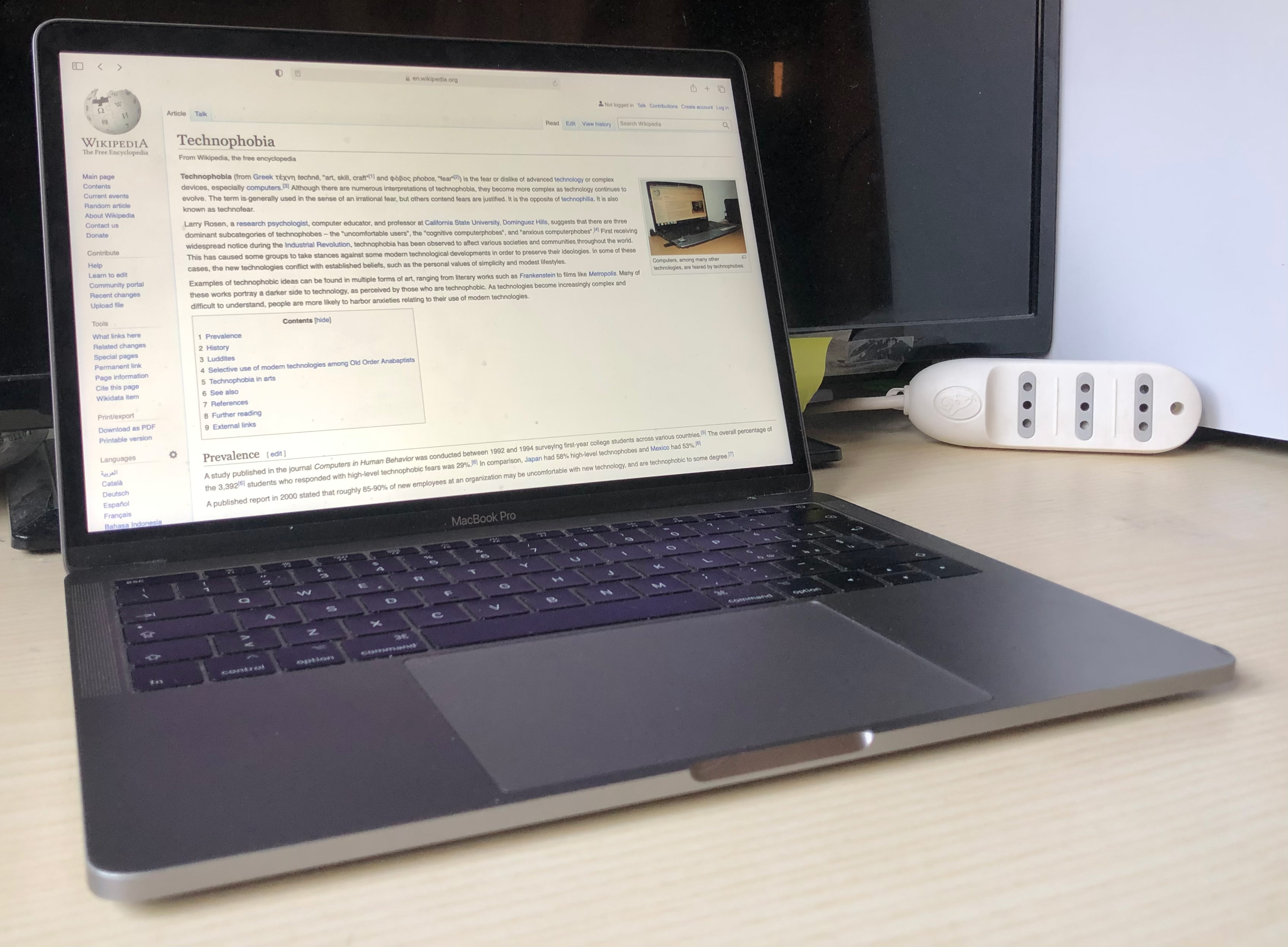
Computers, among many other technologies, are feared by technophobes.

Technophobia (Note: also known as Cyberphobia) (from Greek τέχνη technē, "art, skill, craft" and φόβος phobos, "fear"), also known as technofear, is the fear or dislike of, or discomfort with, advanced technology or complex devices, especially personal computers, smartphones, and tablet computers. A 2018 study proposed a new conceptual and empirical definition of technophobia based on a critical literature review and data analysis results:

Technophobia is an irrational fear and/or anxiety that individuals form as a response to a new stimulus that comes in the form of a technology that modifies and/or changes the individual’s normal or previous routine in performing a certain job/task. Individuals may display active, physical reactions (fear) such as avoidance and/or passive reactions (anxiety) such as distress or apprehension.

Although there are numerous interpretations of technophobia, they become more complex as technology continues to evolve. The term is generally used in the sense of an irrational fear, but others contend fears are justified. It is the opposite of technophilia.

Larry Rosen, a research psychologist, computer educator, and professor at California State University, Dominguez Hills, suggests that there are three dominant subcategories of technophobes – the "uncomfortable users", the "cognitive computerphobes", and "anxious computerphobes". First receiving widespread notice during the Industrial Revolution, technophobia has been observed to affect various societies and communities throughout the world. This has caused some groups to take stances against some modern technological developments in order to preserve their ideologies. In some of these cases, the new technologies conflict with established beliefs, such as the personal values of simplicity and modest lifestyles.

Examples of technophobic ideas can be found in multiple forms of art, ranging from literary works such as Frankenstein to films like The Terminator. Many of these works portray a darker side to technology, as perceived by those who are technophobic. As technologies become increasingly complex and difficult to understand, people are more likely to harbor anxieties relating to their use of modern technologies.

== Prevalence ==
A study published in the journal Computers in Human Behavior was conducted between 1992 and 1994 surveying first-year college students across various countries. The overall percentage of the 3,392 students who responded with high-level technophobic fears was 29%. In comparison, Japan had 58% high-level technophobes and Mexico had 53%.

A published report in 2000 stated that roughly 85–90% of new employees at an organization may be uncomfortable with new technology, and are technophobic to some degree.

== History ==
Technophobia began to gain attention as a movement in England with the dawn of the Industrial Revolution. With the development of new machines able to do the work of skilled craftsmen using unskilled, low-wage labor, those who worked a trade began to fear for their livelihoods. In 1675, a group of weavers destroyed machines that replaced their jobs. By 1727, the destruction had become so prevalent that Parliament made the demolition of machines a capital offense. This action, however, did not stop the tide of violence. The Luddites, a group of anti-technology workers, united under the name "Ludd" in March 1811, removing key components from knitting frames, raiding houses for supplies, and petitioning for trade rights while threatening greater violence. Poor harvests and food riots lent aid to their cause by creating a restless and agitated population for them to draw supporters from.

The 19th century was also the beginning of modern science, with the work of Louis Pasteur, Charles Darwin, Gregor Mendel, Michael Faraday, Henri Becquerel, and Marie Curie, and inventors such as Nikola Tesla, Thomas Edison and Alexander Graham Bell. The world was changing rapidly, too rapidly for many, who feared the changes taking place and longed for a simpler time. The Romantic movement exemplified these feelings. Romantics tended to believe in imagination over reason, the "organic" over the mechanical, and a longing for a simpler, more pastoral time. Poets like William Wordsworth and William Blake believed that the technological changes that were taking place as a part of the industrial revolution were polluting their cherished view of nature as being perfect and pure.

After World War II, a fear of technology continued to grow, catalyzed by the bombings of Hiroshima and Nagasaki. With nuclear proliferation and the Cold War, people began to wonder what would become of the world now that humanity had the power to manipulate it to the point of destruction. Corporate production of war technologies such as napalm, explosives, and gases during the Vietnam War further undermined public confidence in technology's worth and purpose. In the post-WWII era, environmentalism also took off as a movement. The first international air pollution conference was held in 1955 and, in the 1960s, investigations into the lead content of gasoline sparked outrage among environmentalists. In the 1980s, the depletion of the ozone layer and the threat of global warming began to be taken more seriously.

=== Luddites ===
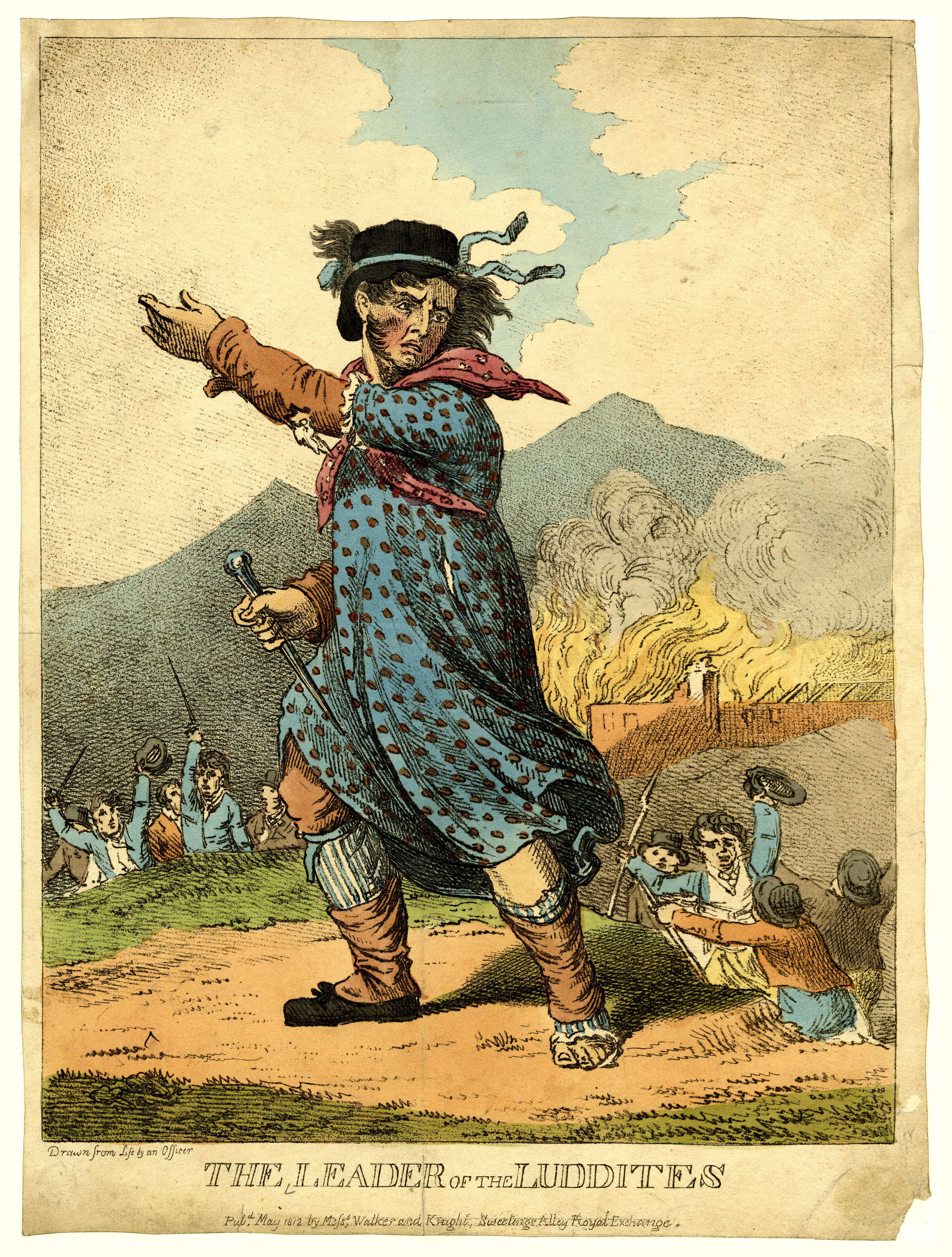
The Leader of the Luddites, engraving of 1812

Several societal groups are considered technophobic, the most recognisable of which are the Luddites. Many technophobic groups revolt against modern technology because of their beliefs that these technologies are threatening their ways of life and livelihoods. The Luddites were a social movement of British artisans in the 19th century who organized in opposition to technological advances in the textile industry. These advances replaced many skilled textile artisans with comparatively unskilled machine operators. The 19th century British Luddites rejected new technologies that impacted the structure of their established trades, or the general nature of the work itself.

Resistance to new technologies did not occur when the newly adopted technology aided the work process without making significant changes to it. The British Luddites protested the application of the machines, rather than the invention of the machine itself. They argued that their labor was a crucial part of the economy, and considered the skills they possessed to complete their labor as property that needed protection from the destruction caused by the autonomy of machines.

=== Use of modern technologies among Old Order Anabaptists ===
Groups considered by some people to be technophobic are the Amish and other Old Order Anabaptists. The Amish follow a set of moral codes outlined in the Ordnung, which rejects the use of certain forms of technology for personal use. Donald B. Kraybill, Karen M. Johnson-Weiner, and Steven M. Nolt state in their book The Amish:

More significantly the Amish modify and adapt technology in creative ways to fit their cultural values and social goals. Amish technologies are diverse, complicated and ever-changing.

What the Amish do, is selective use of modern technologies (e.g. telephones) in order to maintain their belief and culture.

== Technophobia in arts ==
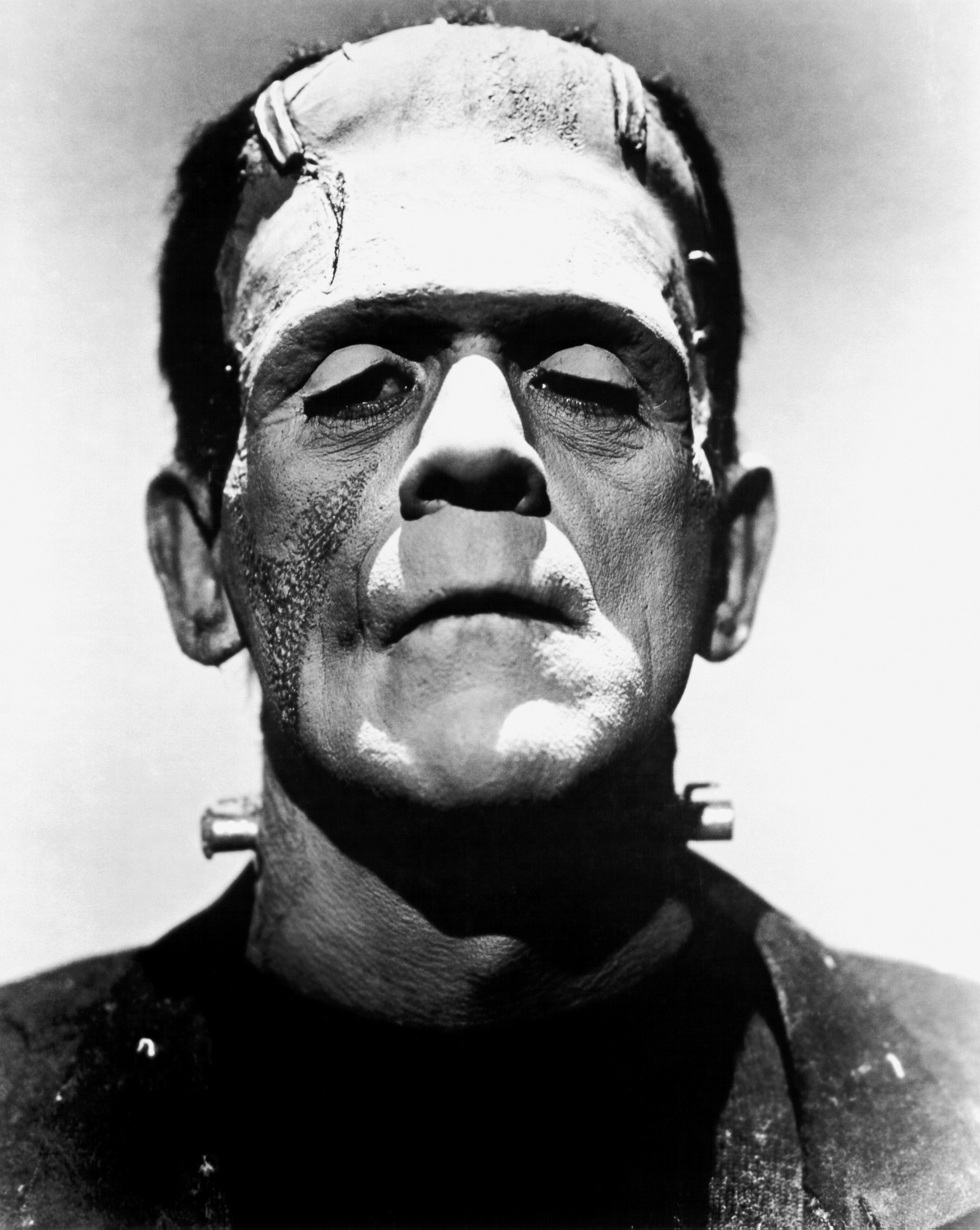
Frankenstein's monster is often considered to be an early example of technophobic ideas in art.

An early example of technophobia in fiction and popular culture is Mary Shelley's Frankenstein.

Technophobia achieved commercial success in the 1980s with the movie The Terminator, in which a computer becomes self-aware, and decides to kill all humans.

Shows such as Doctor Who have tackled the topic of technophobia – most specifically in the episode "The Robots of Death", with a character displaying a great fear of robots due to their lack of body language, described by the Fourth Doctor as giving them the appearance of "dead men walking". Series consultant Kit Pedler also used this fear as a basis for the inspiration of classic Doctor Who monsters the Cybermen, with the creatures being inspired by his own fear of artificial limbs becoming so common that it would become impossible to know when someone had stopped being a man and become simply a machine.

Virtuosity (1995) speaks of a virtual serial killer who manages to escape to the real world. He goes on a rampage before he is stopped. This is a true technophobic movie in that its main plot is about technology gone wrong by introducing a killer who blatantly destroys people.

Avatar is exemplary of technology's hold on humans who are empowered by it and visually demonstrates the amount of terror it instills upon those native to the concept. It enforces the notion that foreign creatures from Pandora are not only frightened by technology, but it is something they loathe; its potential to cause destruction could exceed their very existence. In contrast, the film itself used advanced technology such as the stereoscope in order to give viewers the illusion of physically taking part in an experience that would introduce them to a civilization struggling with technophobia.

A 1960 episode of The Twilight Zone called "A Thing About Machines" deals with one man's hatred for modern things such as electric razors, televisions, electric typewriters, and clocks.

== See also ==
- Anti-consumerism – Sociopolitical ideology
- Erewhon – 1872 utopian novel by Samuel Butler
- Minimalism § Minimalist lifestyle
- Neo-Luddism – Philosophy opposing modern technology
- Ted Kaczynski – American domestic terrorist (1942–2023)
