= Goldilocks (musical) =

Theatrical musical

- Original Cast Recording
- Music: Leroy Anderson
- Lyrics: Jean Kerr; Walter Kerr; Joan Ford
- Book: Jean Kerr; Walter Kerr
- Productions: 1958 Broadway

Goldilocks is a musical with a book by Jean and Walter Kerr, music by Leroy Anderson, and lyrics by the Kerrs and Joan Ford.

== Background ==
A parody of the silent film era when directors made quickie one-reelers overnight, it focuses on Maggie Harris, a musical comedy star retiring from show business in order to marry into high society, until producer-director Max Grady arrives to remind her she has a contract to star in his film Frontier Woman. The two battle and slapstick situations ensue as the movie evolves into an epic about Ancient Egypt and filming extends well beyond the amount of time Grady promised it would take to make the movie.

== Production ==
Following tryouts in Boston and Philadelphia, the Broadway production, directed by Walter Kerr and choreographed by Agnes de Mille, opened on October 11, 1958, at the Lunt-Fontanne Theatre and closed on February 28, 1959, after 161 performances. The cast included Elaine Stritch (as Maggie), Don Ameche (as Max Grady), Russell Nype (as George Randolph Brown), Margaret Hamilton (as Bessie), Pat Stanley (as Lois Lee), and Patricia Birch (dancer). Ameche was a replacement for Barry Sullivan, originally cast in the role.

Musicals Tonight! presented the musical in concert in June 2000 in New York City.

42nd Street Moon in San Francisco, California presented the show in staged concert in 2001.

An original cast recording, orchestrated by composer Anderson and Philip J. Lang, was released by Columbia Records.

Jean Kerr later recounted the trials and tribulations of creating a new musical in her books Please Don't Eat the Daisies, The Snake Has All the Lines, and Penny Candy.

== Song list ==
Act I

- Lazy Moon
- Give the Little Lady
- Save a Kiss
- No One'll Ever Love You
- If I Can't Take It with Me
- Who's Been Sitting in My Chair?
- There Never Was a Woman
- The Pussy Foot

Act II

- Lady in Waiting
- The Beast in You
- Shall I Take My Heart and Go?
- Bad Companions
- I Can't Be in Love
- I Never Know When
- The Town House Maxixe (Dance)
- Two Years in the Making
- Heart of Stone (Pyramid Dance)

== Awards and nominations ==
Source: Playbill

- Tony Award for Best Featured Actor in a Musical (Nype, winner, in a tie)
- Tony Award for Best Featured Actress in a Musical (Stanley, winner)
- Tony Award for Best Costume Design (nominee)
- Tony Award for Best Choreography (nominee)
- Tony Award for Best Conductor and musical director (nominee)
