= Jean Kerr =

Irish-American author and playwright (1922–2003)

- Kerr c. 1970s
- Born: Bridget Jean Collins; July 10, 1922; Scranton, Pennsylvania, U.S.
- Died: January 5, 2003 (aged 80); White Plains, New York, U.S.
- Occupations: Author; Playwright
- Spouse: Walter Kerr (m. 1943; died 1996)
- Writing career
- Notable awards: Tony Award (1961, for King of Hearts)

Jean Kerr (born Bridget Jean Collins; July 10, 1922 – January 5, 2003) (Note: Time Magazine, February 1, 17, 2003 Page 8) was an American author and playwright who authored the 1957 bestseller Please Don't Eat the Daisies (Note: The book has sold millions of copies since its original publication in 1957.) and the plays King of Hearts in 1954 and Mary, Mary in 1961.

== Early life and education ==
Kerr was born on July 10, 1922, in Scranton, Pennsylvania to Irish immigrant parents Tom and Kitty Collins, and grew up on Electric Street in Scranton. She attended Marywood Seminary, the topic of her humorous short story "When I was Queen of the May." She received a bachelor's degree from Marywood College in Scranton and attended The Catholic University of America, where she received her master's degree in 1945.

A nun at Marywood persuaded her to drop her first name, because "only Irish washerwomen are named Biddie".

== Career ==
I have two trifling ambitions in the theater: to make a lot of people laugh and to make a lot of money.

— Kerr in Theatre Arts Magazine

The Kerrs worked together on several projects, including a 1946 adaptation of the novel, The Song of Bernadette. They contributed lyrics and sketches to the musical Touch and Go, and co-authored Goldilocks (1958), a Broadway musical comedy about the early days of silent film that ran from October 11, 1958, to February 28, 1959, and won two Tony Awards, for Best Actress in a Featured Role (Pat Stanley) and Best Actor in a Featured Role (Russell Nype).

The Kerrs also collaborated on the Tony Award-winning King of Hearts (1954), which ran for 279 performances; he directed the play that she co-wrote with Eleanor Brooke. King of Hearts was adapted for the screen in 1956 under the title That Certain Feeling. The film starred Bob Hope.

Jean Kerr wrote Jenny Kissed Me, which was produced in December 1948. She wrote the hit comedy Mary, Mary, which ran on Broadway from 1961 through 1964, for more than 1500 performances, and was brought to the screen under the same title in a 1963 film, starring Debbie Reynolds and Barry Nelson, which was a big hit.

She wrote sketches for John Murray Anderson's Almanac. Her book Please Don't Eat the Daisies was a big success, and it was made into a feature film in 1960. NBC also produced a 58-episode situation comedy starring Pat Crowley from 1965 to 1967, based on the book She then wrote The Snake Has All the Lines in 1960.

Kerr's play Finishing Touches ran from February to July 1973. Her other works include the plays Poor Richard (1964) and Lunch Hour (1980). She also wrote the books Penny Candy (1970) and How I Got to Be Perfect (1978). Her last play, Lunch Hour, was staged in 1980, and featured Sam Waterson and Gilda Radner. Kerr was skeptical of casting Radner in the play, but Mike Nichols persuaded her to watch Gilda Live, and Kerr was won over by her performance in the film, and she was offered the part.

Kerr was known to author her manuscripts and articles in longhand, and more than often, they were written in the family car, and her husband then typed them. American author Ernest K. Gann wrote in his book Twilight for the Gods, that "anyone who reads it [Please Don't Eat the Daisies], will consider it the most reasonable thing in the world that she prefers to do her writing seated in an automobile and parked two blocks away from her Larchmont, New York, home".

American cartoonist Dick Hodgins Jr. drew a caricature of Kerr in 1963, which was featured in several newspapers at the time.

== Personal life ==
Kerr was married to New York drama critic Walter Kerr; they were married on August 16, 1943. The marriage lasted until his death in 1996. The couple had six children; Christopher, twins Colin and John, Gilbert, Gregory, and Kitty.

The Kerrs bought a house in New Rochelle, New York, and later settled in Larchmont, New York in 1955. Their house in Larchmont was frequently characterized in her writings; it featured a two-story fireplace, turrets, a medieval courtyard, and a 32-bell carillon which played the duet from the opera Carmen at noon every day. (Note: Kerr with husband and 3 of their 4 sons (top to bottom) Christopher, 12, Johnny, 8, & Gilbert, 5, posing behind ornate door of their home which was once the door of St. Gabriel's Church. Featured in Life, February 1958. Photograph by Alfred Eisenstaedt.) The house was previously owned by Charles King, who test drove Henry Ford's first car.

She died of pneumonia in White Plains, New York in 2003.

== Books ==
- Please Don't Eat the Daisies (1957)
- The Snake Has All the Lines (1960)
- Penny Candy (1970)
- How I Got to Be Perfect (1979)

== Plays ==
- The Song of Bernadette (1946)
- Our Hearts Were Young and Gay (1946)
- Jenny Kissed Me (1948)
- Touch-and-Go (1949)
- John Murray Anderson's Almanac (1953)
- King of Hearts (1954)
- Goldilocks: A Musical (1958)
- Mary, Mary (1961)
- Poor Richard (1964)
- Finishing Touches (1973)
- Lunch Hour (1980)
