= Miss Tatlock's Millions =

1948 film by Richard Haydn

- Directed by: Richard Haydn
- Written by: Charles Brackett; Richard L. Breen
- Based on: Oh Brother by Jacques Deval
- Produced by: Charles Brackett
- Starring: John Lund; Wanda Hendrix; Barry Fitzgerald; Monty Woolley
- Cinematography: Charles Lang
- Edited by: Everett Douglas; Doane Harrison
- Music by: Victor Young
- Production company: Paramount Pictures
- Distributed by: Paramount Pictures
- Release date: November 19, 1948
- Running time: 101 minutes
- Country: United States
- Language: English
- Box office: $2.3 million (US rentals)

Miss Tatlock's Millions is a 1948 American screwball comedy film directed by Richard Haydn and starring John Lund, Wanda Hendrix and Barry Fitzgerald. Produced and distributed by Paramount Pictures, it was based on the play Oh Brother by Jacques Deval.

== Plot ==
Movie stuntman Tim Burke is offered $1000 for a couple of days of work by Denno Noonan. Noonan was the "social secretary" for the mentally incompetent orphan Schuyler Tatlock. Schuyler's wealthy relations shipped him off to Hawaii to get him out of the way and paid Noonan very well to watch over him. However, Noonan got drunk two years ago, and when he returned home, he discovered that Schuyler had found some matches, started a fire and was burned to a crisp. Noonan has not bothered to notify his family, liking his big monthly paycheck. However, he has received a telegram telling him to bring Schuyler home for the reading of his grandparents' will. Noonan hires lookalike Tim to impersonate Schuyler.

Tim dyes his hair and affects the voice and mannerisms of Schuyler the best he can. Everyone is fooled, including Schuyler's younger sister Nan, the only member of the family happy to see him. Practically the entire fortune, about $6 million, goes to Schuyler. Miles, Gifford and Cassie, his greedy uncles and aunt, scheme to be named his trustees. Miles and Gifford team up and offer Cassie a deal for her support: a $100,000 annual allowance for Nan, which Cassie will control. Cassie, worried about what would happen when Nan turns 21 or gets married, insists that Nan marry her son Nicky. Tim overhears the entire scheme.

At his mother's urging, playboy Nicky starts romancing Nan, who is not immune to his charms. Tim becomes jealous and does his best to interfere, so Cassie has him locked in his room. Tim falls through a greenhouse roof after escaping out the window and is knocked unconscious. Groggy, he speaks rationally in the presence of Nan and Nicky. Nan, recalling that Schuyler's irrationality was caused by a childhood blow to the head, hopes that a second blow may have cured him. Dr. Mason allows that it is possible, so Tim decides to remain lucid.

Tim falls in love with Nan, who gets more than she bargained for when she kisses him to show him the difference between brotherly and romantic love.

Then Cassie discovers the truth. She insists that Tim keep up the impersonation, as the inheritance would otherwise go to a charity. After two years, Nan would come of age, and Schuyler could have a staged death. Cassie is confident that Nan would provide for her relations and agrees to drop the idea of Nan's marriage to her son. Noonan tells Nan that Schuyler had lucid periods before, but has always relapsed, and that Schuyler feels his rationality slipping away again. The two men head to Hawaii.

Fortunately, Noonan produces the real Schuyler, who is very much alive and married to a native Hawaiian named Kamamamalua. The authorities finally caught up with him after a long string of arsons. Nan and Tim are reunited.

== Cast ==
- John Lund as Tim Burke
- Wanda Hendrix as Nan Tatlock
- Barry Fitzgerald as Denno Noonan
- Monty Woolley as Miles Tatlock
- Robert Stack as Nicky Van Alen
- Ilka Chase as Cassie Van Alen
- Dorothy Stickney as Emily Tatlock
- Elizabeth Patterson as Cora
- Leif Erickson as Dr. Mason
- Dan Tobin as Gifford Tatlock
- Hilo Hattie as Kamamamalua
- Richard Haydn as Fergel (as Richard Rancyd)

== Production ==
Paramount bought film rights to the play prior to publication.

== Reception ==
Bosley Crowther panned the movie, writing that "Lunacy in a family is not a particularly funny thing, nor does it seem fitting and tasteful as a matter to be treated as farce."

William Brogdon of Variety wrote that Miss Tatlock's Millions "adds up to okay entertainment with a load of chuckles spring up from the broad farcing style Richard Haydn has used for his first screen directing stint [...] John Lund and Wanda Hendrix team brightly in the principal roles and film receives major assists from Barry Fitzgerald, Monty Woolley, Ilka Chase and others".

A Boxoffice review called the film a "fast, furious, and frenzied farce designed to keep audiences in a constant uproar[...] the comedy ranges from subtlety to slapstick and the dull moments are few and far between despite a somewhat lengthy running time".
