= Technophilia =

Strong enthusiasm for technology

Technophilia (from Greek τέχνη - technē, "art, skill, craft" and φίλος - philos, "beloved, dear, friend") refers generally to a strong attraction for technology, especially new technologies such as personal computers, the Internet, mobile phones, and home cinema. The term is used in sociology to examine individuals' interactions with society and is contrasted with technophobia.

On a psychodynamic level, technophilia generates the expression of its opposite, technophobia. Technophilia and technophobia are the two extremes of the relationship between technology and society. The technophile regards most or all technology positively, adopts new forms of technology enthusiastically, sees it as a means to improve life, and some may even view it as a means to combat social problems.

Technophiles do not have a fear of the effects of the technological advancements on society, as do technophobes. Technological determinism is the theory that humanity has little power to resist the influence that technology has on society.

== Etymology ==
The word technophile is said to have originated in the 1960s as an "unflattering word introduced by technophobes". The idea of technophilia can be used to focus on the larger idea on how technology can create strong innovative positive feelings about different technologies. On the other hand, sometimes technology can prevent an accurate view on environmental and the social impact of technology when it comes to society. Technophiles also are not afraid of the effects that today's developed technologies have on society compared to technophobes.

== Narcissism through technophilia ==
Many forms of technology are seen as venerable because the user experiences them as the embodiment of their own narcissism. Technophiles enjoy using technology and focus on the egocentric benefits of technology rather than seeing the potential issues associated with using technology too frequently. The notion of addiction is often negatively associated with technophilia, and describes technophiles who become too dependent on the forms of technology they possess.

== Technological utopia ==
Technophiles may view technology's interaction with society as creating a utopia, cyber or otherwise, and a strong indescribable futuristic feeling. "In the utopian stories, technologies are seen as natural societal developments, improvements to daily life, or as forces that will transform reality for the better. Dystopian reactions emphasize fears of losing control, becoming dependent, and being unable to stop change". Both utopian and dystopian streams are weaved in Aldous Huxley's Brave New World (1932) and George Orwell's Nineteen Eighty-Four (1949).

== See also ==
- Technocracy
- Technological determinism
- Technophobia
- Transhumanism
