= Mary, Mary (play) =

1961 play by Jean Kerr

- Original language: English
- Written by: Jean Kerr
- Characters: Mary McKellaway; Bob McKellaway; Dirk Winsten; Oscar Nelson; Tiffany Richards
- Genre: comedy
- Setting: Bob McKellaway's living room in a New York apartment building. The Present.

Premiere
- Date: March 8, 1961
- Place: Helen Hayes Theatre; New York City

Mary, Mary is a play by Jean Kerr. After two previews, the Broadway production opened on March 8, 1961, at the original Helen Hayes Theatre, where it ran for nearly three years and nine months before transferring to the Morosco, where it closed on December 12, 1964, after 1572 performances, making it the longest-running non-musical Broadway play of the 1960s.

== Production ==
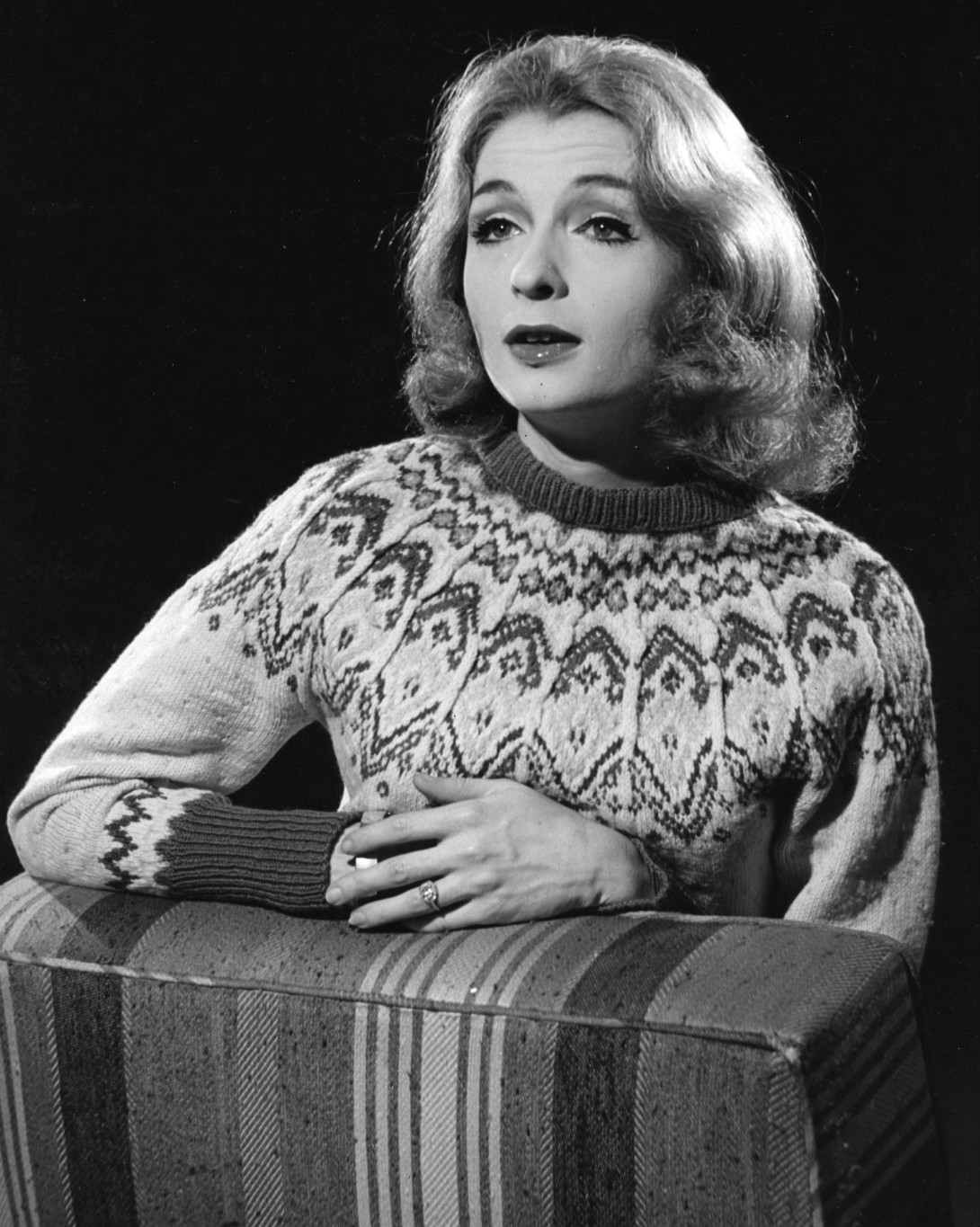
Carrie Nye as Tiffany in Mary, Mary (1961)

Directed by Joseph Anthony, the original cast starred Barbara Bel Geddes as Mary, Barry Nelson as Bob, Michael Rennie as Dirk, John Cromwell as Oscar, and Betsy Von Furstenberg as Tiffany. Bel Geddes was nominated for the Tony Award for Best Actress in a Play.

Later in the run, Nancy Olson and Inger Stevens were among those who assumed the role of Mary, while Bob was portrayed by George Grizzard, Murray Hamilton, and Tom Poston. Hiram Sherman replaced Cromwell as Oscar, Edward Mulhare and Michael Wilding appeared as Dirk, and Carrie Nye was cast as Tiffany.

The London production opened in February 1963 with Maggie Smith in the role of Mary, running until February 1964.

The play became extremely popular at summer stock theatres, with notable productions including Shari Lewis and Alvin Epstein at the Bucks County Playhouse and real-life married couple Craig Stevens and Alexis Smith at the Shady Grove Theatre. Bob was played by Chuck Connors at the Sahara Tahoe Casino in 1972, and Farley Granger played the role in an Equity stock company production in Queens in 1977.

Mary, Mary was revived off-off-Broadway in 2019 by Retro Productions.

== Plot ==
The plot focuses on wisecracking cynic Mary and infuriatingly-sensible Bob, who have recently divorced and have not seen each other in nine months. They meet at his apartment in hopes that they can avert an audit by the Internal Revenue Service, and a snowstorm forces Mary to spend the night. The next morning, mutual friend and lawyer Oscar, Hollywood-heartthrob neighbor Dirk Winston, and Bob's considerably-younger fiancée Tiffany arrive on the scene. The comedy's humor is derived from discussions about income taxes, marriage, alimony, divorce, remarriage, extramarital affairs, weight-loss programs, exercise, and sex.

== Film ==
Richard L. Breen adapted Kerr's play for a 1963 film version directed by Mervyn LeRoy. Nelson, Rennie, and Sherman reprised their stage roles, with Debbie Reynolds as Mary and Diane McBain as Tiffany. It opened at Radio City Music Hall to lukewarm reviews. The play ran far longer than the movie.
