= Please Don't Eat the Daisies (film) =

1960 film by Charles Walters

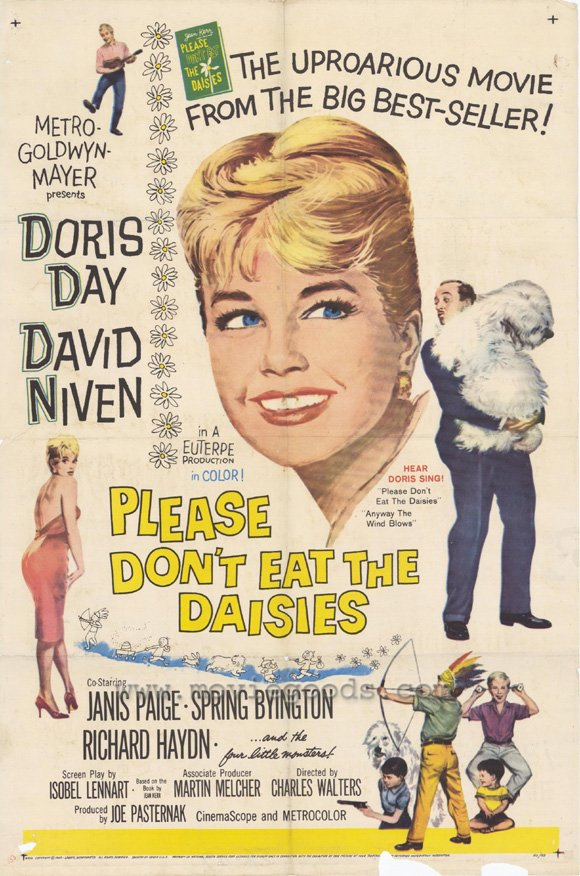
- Theatrical poster
- Directed by: Charles Walters
- Screenplay by: Isobel Lennart
- Based on: Please Don't Eat the Daisies; 1957 book by Jean Kerr
- Produced by: Joe Pasternak
- Starring: Doris Day; David Niven; Janis Paige; Richard Haydn; Spring Byington
- Cinematography: Robert J. Bronner
- Edited by: John McSweeney Jr.
- Music by: David Rose
- Production company: Euterpe Inc.
- Distributed by: Metro-Goldwyn-Mayer
- Release date: March 31, 1960 (Radio City Music Hall)
- Running time: 112 minutes
- Country: United States
- Language: English
- Budget: $1,775,000
- Box office: $7,050,000

Please Don't Eat the Daisies is a 1960 American Metrocolor comedy film in CinemaScope starring Doris Day and David Niven, made by Euterpe Inc., and distributed by Metro-Goldwyn-Mayer. The movie was directed by Charles Walters and produced by Joe Pasternak, with Martin Melcher (Day's husband) as associate producer.

The screenplay was written by Isobel Lennart and was partly inspired by the 1957 book of the same name, a collection of humorous essays, by Jean Kerr.

The film also features Janis Paige, Spring Byington, Richard Haydn, Patsy Kelly, and Jack Weston. Spring Byington made her final film appearance in this film, but appeared in TV shows later.

== Plot ==
Professor Lawrence "Larry" Mackay and his wife Kate are struggling with four young sons in a tiny two-bedroom apartment in New York City. Months before, they had announced their intention to move to a house in the country, but have not been able to find one. Meanwhile, their lease has expired and the landlord has rented out their apartment to someone who insists they vacate in three weeks. They decide to again look for a house in the country, but the only thing they can afford is a run-down mansion complete with secret panels and trap doors, 70 miles (112 km) away by train in fictional Hooton. They have no choice but to move in and start fixing it up.

Before the moving chaos, Larry has left his professorship at the university to become a drama critic for a major New York newspaper. His first assignment is to review the new show produced by his best friend, Alfred North. The show is awful, and Larry's review is especially hard on the show's star, Deborah Vaughn, who gets her revenge by hiring a press photographer to capture her slapping Larry's face at Sardi's. This publicity stunt, along with Larry's published response, makes Larry the toast of the town. Kate and Larry are suddenly invited to society parties and hobnobbing with the rich and famous, which begins to go to Larry's head. With the hammering and builders at home, Larry decides to stay in a hotel in the city for a week, leaving Kate to organize the new house.

Back home, Kate tries her best to manage the four children and fit into their new community. When asked by the local dramatic society to find them an original play for their next production, Kate turns to Alfred. Alfred, seeing a chance for a bit of revenge of his own, gives them a terrible play written by a young Lawrence Mackay — with an altered title and fictitious playwright listed on the cover. Alfred then secretly invites all of the major New York critics to review the play. Larry finds out and has a huge fight with Kate, blaming her for his professional embarrassment. He refuses to allow the show to go on. Kate insists it is too late for the Hooton Holler Players to get another show ready; so Larry reluctantly allows them to proceed, publishing his own review of the show before opening night.

Not to be left out, Deborah Vaughn decides to strike up a close, personal friendship with Larry, flattering him seductively. Kate's mother Suzie Robinson urges her to get Larry back before it is too late. Kate and Larry make up and return to their country home in time for one of the boys to drop a water bomb on them from an upstairs window.

== Cast ==
- Doris Day as Kate Robinson Mackay
- David Niven as Lawrence "Larry" Mackay
- Janis Paige as Deborah Vaughn
- Spring Byington as Suzie Robinson
- Richard Haydn as Alfred North
- Patsy Kelly as Maggie
- Jack Weston as Joe Positano
- John Harding as Reverend Norman McQuarry
- Margaret Lindsay as Mona James
- Carmen Phillips as Mary Smith
- Mary Patton as Mrs. Hunter
- Charles Herbert as David Mackay
- Stanley Livingston as Gabriel MacKay
- Flip Mark as George MacKay
- Baby Gellert as Adam McKay

== Production ==
MGM acquired rights to the book for $75,000. Jean Kerr stipulated that they had to fictionalize everything to avoid additional publicity for her family.

== Reception ==
According to MGM records the film earned $5,150,000 in the US and Canada and $1.9 million elsewhere, resulting in a profit of $1,842,000.

Bosley Crowther of The New York Times found the characters "over-eager, over-witty and overwrought—and also undernourished with the substance of good solid farce." Variety declared, "Yarn launches with a couple of belly laughs, and this high degree of merriment is sustained more or less through its entire 111-minutes' running time, long for a comedy but so well turned out here that it's seldom in need of shearing." Philip K. Scheuer of the Los Angeles Times wrote that "any resemblance between Lawrence Mackay and any drama critic I ever heard of is purely coincidental. What resemblance remains between the essays and the movie I can't say—except that the movie certainly isn't very funny." Harrison's Reports declared, "Although the humor is more of the hearty chuckle than belly laugh variety, there is enough of it to give a merry effect which is delicately balanced against the seriousness of the problems of a professor turned drama critic." John McCarten of The New Yorker wrote, "One and all try hard to amuse, but the screenplay defies them."

== Television adaptation ==
A television series based on the film starring Patricia Crowley and Mark Miller ran for 58 episodes on NBC from 1965 to 1967. In the series, Crowley and Miller portrayed Joan Nash, a newspaper columnist, and John Nash, a college professor, raising their four sons in fictional Ridgemont, New York.

== See also ==
- List of American films of 1960
