= A Thing About Machines =

- The Twilight Zone episode
- Episode no.: Season 2 Episode 4
- Directed by: David Orrick McDearmon
- Written by: Rod Serling
- Production code: 173-3645
- Original air date: October 28, 1960

Guest appearances
- Richard Haydn as Bartlett Finchley; Barbara Stuart as Edith Rogers; Barney Phillips as TV Repairman; Henry Beckman as Policeman

Episode chronology
← Previous "Nervous Man in a Four Dollar Room"	Next → "The Howling Man"
- The Twilight Zone (1959 TV series) (season 2)

"A Thing About Machines" is episode 40 of the American television anthology series The Twilight Zone. It originally aired on October 28, 1960, on CBS.

== Opening narration ==
This is Mr. Bartlett Finchley, age forty-eight, a practicing sophisticate who writes very special and very precious things for gourmet magazines and the like. He's a bachelor and a recluse with few friends, only devotees and adherents to the cause of tart sophistry. He has no interests save whatever current annoyances he can put his mind to. He has no purpose to his life except the formulation of day-to-day opportunities to vent his wrath on mechanical contrivances of an age he abhors. In short, Mr. Bartlett Finchley is a malcontent, born either too late or too early in the century, and who, in just a moment, will enter a realm where muscles and the will to fight back are not limited to human beings. Next stop for Mr. Bartlett Finchley - The Twilight Zone.

== Plot ==
Lonely, ill-tempered gourmet magazine critic and misanthrope Bartlett Finchley berates a repairman after the latter fixes his television and tells him to stop abusing his appliances over mild inconveniences. Believing the machines are conspiring against him, however, Finchley continues to do so. Fed up with his paranoid behavior, his secretary quits. Following this, his typewriter types out the message "GET OUT OF HERE FINCHLEY" repeatedly on its own and the TV displays a program with a woman saying the same message. While trying to shave, his electric shaver rises and lunges at him before his telephone repeats the typewriter and TV's message despite Finchley ripping the telephone out of the wall earlier.

Finchley hears a siren outside and goes to investigate, finding that his car rolled down the driveway and nearly hit a child. After rudely dismissing the attending police officer and neighbors, Finchley returns to his house, drinks, and passes out. When he awakens, the machines repeatedly tell him to leave while his razor slithers downstairs after him. He runs outside, only to be chased by his car until he ends up drowning in the pool and sinking to the bottom. The next day the police pull his body out, neither they nor the ambulance personnel can understand how he sank without being weighted, and theorize he may have had a heart attack.

== Closing narration ==
Yes, it could just be. It could just be that Mr. Bartlett Finchley succumbed from a heart attack and a set of delusions. It could just be that he was tormented by an imagination as sharp as his wit and as pointed as his dislikes. But as perceived by those attending, this is one explanation that has left the premises with the deceased. Look for it filed under 'M' for Machines - in The Twilight Zone.

== Cast ==
- Richard Haydn as Bartlett Finchley
- Barbara Stuart as Edith Rogers
- Barney Phillips as TV repairman
- Jay Overholts as Intern
- Henry Beckman as Policeman
- Margarita Cordova as Girl on TV

== See also ==
- List of The Twilight Zone (1959 TV series) episodes

== Bibliography ==
- DeVoe, Bill. (2008). Trivia from The Twilight Zone. Albany, GA: Bear Manor Media. ISBN 978-1-59393-136-0
- Grams, Martin. (2008). The Twilight Zone: Unlocking the Door to a Television Classic. Churchville, MD: OTR Publishing. ISBN 978-0-9703310-9-0
