= Pat Stanley =

American actress

- Occupation(s): Actress, singer and dancer

Pat Stanley is an American retired actress, dancer and singer.

== Career ==
Stanley won her Tony Award in the category of Best Featured Actress in a Musical in the 1958-1959 season, for her performance as "Lois Lee" in the musical Goldilocks. She was nominated in 1962 for a Tony Award for Best Featured Actress in a Play for her role as "Eileen Taylor" in Sunday in New York.

Stanley made frequent appearances in prime time television on Breslin's Neighborhood, Thieves Carnival (Play of the Week 1959), Omnibus (1958), The NBC Comedy Hour, The Ed Sullivan Show (1958) and A George Abbott Special (1955). On daytime television, she has played Mrs. Goodman #2 on The Edge of Night in 1982 and 1983. In films, she was featured in the Jerry Lewis movie The Ladies Man (1961).

== Personal life ==
Stanley was married to songwriter Johnny Burke, and later to writer William Hanley.

Since 1980 she had been married to third husband, actor and artist Gerry Matthews. She lives in retirement in Walla Walla, Washington.

== Broadway stage productions ==
- 1952: Of Thee I Sing as dancer
- 1953: Carnival in Flanders as Siska
- 1957: Carousel as Carrie
- 1958: Blue Denim as Lillian
- 1958: Goldilocks as Lois Lee
- 1959: Fiorello! as Dora
- 1961: Sunday in New York as Eileen Taylor
- 1981: The Five O'Clock Girl as Susan Snow

== National tours ==
- 1953: Pajama Game as Gladys
- 1952: A Tree Grows in Brooklyn as dance lead

== Summer Stock ==
- 1950s: Lend an Ear, Brigadoon, Pajama Game, One Touch of Venus

== Night clubs ==
- 1980: Solo act at Once Upon a Stove
