= The Disenchanted =

1950 novel by Budd Schulberg

- Author: Budd Schulberg
- Language: English
- Subject: Hollywood
- Publication date: 1950
- Publication place: USA

The Disenchanted is a 1950 American novel by Budd Schulberg.

The novel is about a young screenwriter, Shep, who collaborates on a screenplay about a college winter festival with a famous novelist, Manley Halliday, who was successful in the 1920s but is now considered over the hill. It was reportedly based on Schulberg's experiences writing the film Winter Carnival with F. Scott Fitzgerald.

Sheilah Graham wrote the novel contained "a one-dimensional portrait of Scott. It showed him at his very worst, whining, antagonistic, boastful, exhausted. It simply was not true. When he was drunk, perhaps, but Budd had also seen Scott sober... He was not the miserable man in Schulberg’s book. How could Budd, who professed to love Scott, who seemed to regard himself as his heir, present such a dreadful image of him to the world?"

== Play adaptation ==
The novel was adapted for a stage play by Schulberg and Harvey Breit. This debuted on Broadway in 1958, starring Jason Robards, Rosemary Harris and George Grizzard.

Variety called it "a bare-knuckle chronicle of the fadeout years of a once-great literary giant. Its dialog and action pour salt on the open wounds of a career shattered by a dissipating influence it could not control. Tense, at times stirring drama and exceptionally well acted, this isn’t “entertainment” in the more frivolous sense of the word but it should have substantial appeal to playgoers who appreciate something more."

A feature film version was announced by Seven Arts Productions but it was never made.

== Awards and nominations ==
=== Original Broadway production ===
Year	Award	Category	Nominee	Result
1959	Tony Award	Best Play		Nominated
1959	Tony Award	Best Actor in a Play	Jason Robards	Nominated
1959	Tony Award	Best Featured Actor in a Play	George Grizzard	Nominated
