= Whoop-Up =

Musical

- Page from sheet music (cropped)
- Music: Mark Charlap
- Lyrics: Norman Gimbel
- Book: Cy Feuer and Ernest Martin
- Basis: ”Stay Away, Joe” by Dan Cushman
- Productions: 1958 Broadway

Whoop-Up is a musical with music by Moose Charlap, lyrics by Norman Gimbel, and book by Cy Feuer and Ernest Martin, based on Stay Away, Joe by Dan Cushman. It was directed by Cy Feuer, with sets and lighting by Jo Mielziner and choreography by Onna White.

Produced by Feuer and Martin, the Broadway production opened on December 22, 1958 at the Shubert Theatre, where it ran for 56 performances. Cast included Sylvia Syms, Paul Ford, Susan Johnson, Ralph Young and Romo Vincent. Julienne Marie was nominated for a Tony Award for Best Featured Actress in a Musical for her performance. The plot is described thus: "Welcome to Glenda's Place - a saloon half-on, half-off a Montana Indian reservation. Glenda's one tough gal, until her native American boyfriend returns after two years on the rodeo circuit."

An original cast recording was made by MGM Records but the show's short run curtailed album sales and the record was soon deleted from the catalog. In 1987 Larry L. Lash at PolyGram Records, which had purchased the MGM catalogue, digitally remastered and reissued Whoop-Up on CD, adding ten bonus tracks of songs from the score performed by pop artists of the day including Connie Francis, Maurice Chevalier and Rosemary Clooney, as well as the composers' demo recording of a song cut from the show during out-of-town tryouts. The CD was embraced by Broadway cast album collectors but did not sell well and it, too, was soon deleted. The recording is now owned by Universal Music Group, but Brian Drutman of its Decca Broadway label said that with the weak sales of the previous edition there is little reason for Decca to reissue the title.

== Songs ==
Act I
- "Glenda’s Place"
- "When the Tall Man Talks"
- "Nobody Throw Those Bull"
- "Rocky Boy Ceremonial"
- "Love Eyes"
- "Men"
- "Never Before"
- "Caress Me, Possess Me Perfume"
- "Flattery"
- "The Girl In His Arms"
- "The Best of What This Country’s Got"
Act II
- "I Wash My Hands"
- "Quarrel-tet"
- "Sorry for Myself"
- "‘Til the Big Fat Moon Falls Down"
- "What I Mean to Say"
- "Montana"
- "She or Her"

== See also ==
- Whoop-Up Trail
