= Siobhán McHugh =

Siobhán McHugh is an Irish-Australian author, podcast producer, radio presenter, oral historian, audio documentary-maker and journalism academic. In 2013 she founded RadioDoc Review, the first journal of critical analysis of crafted audio storytelling podcasts and features, for which she received an academic research award. She is Associate Professor of Journalism (honorary) at the University of Wollongong (UOW). and Associate Professor of Media and Communications (honorary) at the University of Sydney. Her latest book, The Power of Podcasting: telling stories through sound, was published by NewSouth Books in February 2022, with a US edition through Columbia University Press in October 2022.

== Biography ==
McHugh was born in Dublin, the second of six children, and graduated from University College Dublin with a Bachelor of Science. She was appointed a radio producer at RTÉ, the Irish state broadcaster, in 1981. In 1985, she moved to Australia, to work at the Australian Broadcasting Corporation (ABC)'s Radio National (then 3AR) in Melbourne. Sydney-based from 1986, she built a career as a writer of social histories, an oral historian and a maker of radio documentaries. Over this time she won prestigious national and international awards, including the New South Wales State Literary Award for Non-Fiction for The Snowy: The People Behind the Power, a history of the Snowy Mountains Hydro-Electric Scheme, the birthplace of Australian multiculturalism.

In 2006, McHugh was awarded a scholarship to undertake a Doctorate of Creative Arts at the University of Wollongong. Her practice-based research, based on 50 oral histories, examined sectarianism between Catholics (mostly of Irish background) and Protestants (mostly Anglo and Scottish) in pre-multicultural Australia. The resulting radio documentary Marrying Out (ABC 2009) won a gold award at the New York Radio Festival; the accompanying dissertation, which examined how oral history and radio production studies could mutually inform each other, won a special commendation from the noted Italian oral historian, Alessandro Portelli.

In 2013, McHugh founded RadioDoc Review, a journal that brought together top international audio producers and scholars to select and assess crafted audio storytelling works, thereby interpreting and establishing a canon of the form. The aesthetics and impact of podcasting has since been the focus of her academic research, teaching and production.

== Literary career ==
McHugh's first book The Snowy – The People Behind the Power was published by William Heinemann Australia in 1989 on the 40th anniversary of the commencement of the Snowy Scheme. A second edition was published by Harper Collins in 1995 and a third, updated edition, The Snowy – A History, with extensive foreword and afterword, was published by New South Books in 2019, to mark the 70th anniversary of this nation-building project.

McHugh's second book was Minefields and Miniskirts: Australian women and the Vietnam war (Doubleday 1993). It recounted the largely untold stories of women who had been in Vietnam during the war, as nurses, journalists, entertainers and more; and documented experiences of the wives of servicemen who had returned damaged, mentally or physically; and women who had been active in the anti-war movement. It was shortlisted for a NSW Women and the Media award. A second edition was published by Lothian in 2005. The book was adapted for the stage by Terence O'Connell and the musical play, Minefields and Miniskirts (Currency Press 2004), debuted at Malthouse Theatre, Melbourne in 2004, starring Tracy Mann, Debra Byrne, Robin Arthur, Tracy Bartram and Wendy Stapleton. It toured Australia and has been staged numerous times since.

McHugh's third book, Cottoning On – Stories of Australian Cotton-growing (Hale and Iremonger 1996), investigated the modern Australian cotton industry. It shed light on the historical allocations of water licences that would later become a contentious issue in management of the Murray-Darling Basin and examined the industry's use of pesticides via largely unregulated aerial spraying practices. The eminent environmental scientist, Professor Richard Kingsford, commended it as a work "of outstanding importance in the management of Australian rivers." Cottoning On was a finalist in the inaugural NSW Premier's History Awards.

McHugh's fourth book, Shelter From the Storm: Bryan Brown, Samoan Chieftains and the little matter of a roof over our head (Allen and Unwin 1999), portrayed the lives of diverse people living in social housing. Photos are by the digital artist Mayu Kanamori. Other, commissioned works include Nick Scali – My Story (Jayenne Press 2003), which chronicles the life story of the Italian multi-millionaire and furniture retailer, and Spirit of Australian Dairy: Portraits and Lifestyles, oral histories of Australian dairy farmers, illustrated by popular photographer Ken Duncan (Dairy Australia 2008).

McHugh's fifth book was a fictional account of the Snowy Scheme through the eyes of a young girl, Eva Fischer, who grows up in the township of Cabramurra. First published as My Story - Snowy: The Diary of Eva Fischer (Scholastic 2003), it had three more editions, most recently as Snowy (Scholastic 2019). It was selected for the NSW Premier's Reading List for children aged c. 11–12 years.

McHugh has also published a short memoir, "Power Cuts", in Wee Girls: Women writing from an Irish perspective (Spinifex 1996); a chapter on pesticides and the cotton industry, "Cotton" in Asimov's Elephant (ABC Books, 2003); and a chapter in an anthology about the Stolen Generations, "The Carers", in Many Voices: reflections on experiences of Indigenous child separation (National Library of Australia, 2002).

In recent years, McHugh has written widely on long-form audio storytelling, oral history and podcasting, for outlets such as The Conversation. Her academic writings can be found here.

== Radio career ==
Over four decades in radio, McHugh has made some 60 audio works, broadcast nationally and internationally, many of which have won or been shortlisted for prestigious awards [see Awards]. Her radio career began in RTE Radio One's Light Entertainment division, where she produced high-rating live shows presented by Mike Murphy, Morgan O'Sullivan, Myles Dungan and Marian Finucane. She also produced documentaries, notably, with Shay Healy, the 18-part Jacobs award-winning social history of Ireland in the Sixties, Strawberry Fields Forever.

In 1985, McHugh moved to Australia and produced a six-part series, The Irish in Australia, Past and Present (1985) for ABC's 3AR. In 1987, she made a radio documentary series, The Snowy -The People Behind the Power, for 2FC (now Radio National)'s new Social History Unit, featuring workers of 25 nationalities who helped build the Snowy Mountains Hydro-Electric Scheme. McHugh produced many other series for the Talking History and Hindsight slots: on the isolated mining town of Broken Hill, Australian women's experiences in the Vietnam war, the former Indigenous penal colony of Palm Island, the history of tourism in the Whitsundays, Irish orphan girls sent to Australia after the 1840s famine, the 1854 Eureka rebellion that was said to be the birthplace of Australian democracy and more.

She also produced a documentary for ABC's religious slot, Encounter, that tracked Aboriginal leader Patrick Dodson's visit to Ireland (Reconciliation: From Broome to Belfast, 2001), a feature for Radio Eye on Samoan chieftains' cultural influence on a drug-ridden housing project in western Sydney (Estate of Mind, 1999) and a documentary, Beagle Bay: Irish nuns and Stolen Children (2000), that explored personal stories of the Stolen Generations in the lead-up to national marches for reconciliation. Among her other works was a series for Into the Music on the rebirth of Irish music worldwide, The Roaring Tiger, co-hosted and produced with the composer and musician Dr. Thomas Fitzgerald.

McHugh's later works for ABC Radio National, also online as podcasts, include Eat Pray Mourn: Crime and Punishment in Jakarta (2013), an investigation, with Dr. Jacqui Baker, of extrajudicial police killings in Indonesia which won bronze at New York Radio Festivals; and The Conquistador, The Warlpiri and the Dog Whisperer (2018), an exploration, with presenter Margo Neale, of how two Chilean women from opposed political backgrounds ended up running a successful Indigenous art centre in the Australian desert.

== Podcasting career ==
McHugh makes, researches and critiques podcasts; she also teaches and promulgates podcasting as a new medium. Among her award-winning storytelling collaborations are The Greatest Menace, a queer history/true crime investigation into a 'gay prison' experiment described by one industry insider as 'Australia's S-Town', co-created by Patrick Abboud and Simon Cunich, and three podcasts made with The Age newsroom in Melbourne, on all of which she was consulting producer, advising on script, structure and storytelling-through-sound.

Phoebe's Fall (2016), an investigation into the bizarre death in a Melbourne garbage chute of a young woman, won gold at New York Radio Festivals and three national awards [See Awards]. Wrong Skin (2018), examined the disappearance of a young couple from a remote Aboriginal community in Western Australia and the collision of culture and power. It also won gold at New York Radio Festivals and three national awards [See Awards]. The Last Voyage of the Pong Su (2019) explores the human stories behind a North Korean drug heist on Victoria's shipwreck coast. It won gold at New York Festivals and was selected among the best investigative journalism podcasts of 2020 by the Global Investigative Journalism Network. McHugh was also consulting producer on Gertie's Law, an innovative podcast by the Supreme Court of Victoria that examines court processes. It won gold at New York Festivals. She later collaborated with Gertie's Law host Greg Muller on the podcast Motherlode, which traced the history of early hacktivism, including the back story to Julian Assange.

McHugh conceived and devised the award-winning podcast Heart of Artness, which she co-hosts with Margo Neale, Head of Indigenous Knowledges at the National Museum of Australia. Heart of Artness features the voices of Indigenous artists and the many non-Indigenous people they associate closely with to produce and market their art. It was produced as a University of Wollongong (UOW) research project funded by the Australian Research Council, in collaboration with art historian Ian McLean.

McHugh has written extensively on podcasting, the audio medium, audio storytelling and associated topics such as the affective power of voice. Her article, How Podcasting is Changing the Audio Storytelling Genre, discusses early adaptations of radio to podcasting, while her piece for Harvard University's Nieman Storyboard, "Subjectivity, hugs and craft: Podcasting as extreme narrative journalism" positions long-form investigative journalism podcasts within the canon of Literary Journalism. She also published a book chapter, "Memoir For Your Ears: The Podcast Life" (2017). Her article, The Narrative Podcast as Digital Literary Journalism: Conceptualizing S-Town, won the 2021 Hartsock Prize for best Literary Journalism Studies article.

McHugh speaks about podcasting at a wide range of events. She was an annual speaker at the Global Editors Network (GEN) media summit in Europe (2015-2019) and an invited speaker at Melbourne's Wheeler Centre (2014), OzPod (Sydney 2017), the BAD True Crime Festival (2019) and the World Journalism Education Conference (Paris 2019). She was keynote speaker at the International Radio Festival in Iran (2010) and the Asia-Pacific Broadcasting Union (ABU)'s General Assembly in Chengdu, China (2017). She has also written articles on podcasting for WAN-IFRA (World Association of Newspapers…) UNESCO, the Sydney Morning Herald and Transom.org and an invited series for Flow Journal at University of Austin. She has conducted podcasting masterclasses and workshops for many groups, including Rutas del Conflicto in Colombia, the Sydney Writers Festival, the Australian War Memorial, the Voice of Vietnam state broadcaster and the ABU. In 2016, she began teaching a curriculum subject in Podcasting for UOW undergraduates and in 2018 launched a Massive Open Online Course (MOOC), "The Power of Podcasting for Storytelling", which had over 35,000 enrolments in over 150 countries.

== Oral history projects ==
McHugh's oral history collections are archived at the National Library of Australia, the State Library of New South Wales, the City of Sydney Library and Sydney Living Museums. They include interviews about the Snowy Mountains Scheme, Australian women in the Vietnam war, the cotton industry, sectarianism and mixed marriage, a history of Bronte and surf lifesaving, Millers Point in Sydney's historic Rocks area, Green Bans activist Jack Mundey, architect Harry Seidler and the Irish National Association.

McHugh has presented on her oral history projects at Harvard University's Native American Program (2011), Concordia University's Centre for Oral History and Digital Storytelling in Montreal and at national and international oral history conferences. Her scholarly article, 'Oral History on Radio: The Affective Power of Sound', first published in Oral History Review (2012) has been republished in The Oral History Reader (eds. Perks, R & Thomson, A. Routledge 2016), the foremost anthology of international oral history scholarship. It is one of fifteen 'influential' articles selected for the first virtual edition produced by the US Oral History Association to mark their fiftieth anniversary in 2016.

== Awards ==
- Hartsock Prize for best Literary Journalism Studies article of 2021 for The Narrative Podcast as Digital Literary Journalism: Conceptualizing S-Town
- Winner, gold, New York Radio Festival (2022): The Greatest Menace, Best Social Justice Podcast
- Winner, gold, New York Radio Festival (2019): Heart of Artness podcast, Episode 2: 'Art with Heart: A Two-Ways World', with Margo Neale and Ian Mclean
- Winner, gold, New York Radio Festival 2019: Wrong Skin podcast, with team from The Age
- Winner, Australian Podcasting Awards (2019) Podcast of the Year: Wrong Skin podcast
- Winner, gold, New York Radio Festival 2017, Phoebe's Fall podcast, with team from The Age
- Anne Dunn Scholar of the Year 2014 (awarded by Journalism Education and Research Association of Australia and Australian and New Zealand Communications Association)
- Winner, gold (Religion category) New York Radio Festival (2010): Marrying Out – radio documentary
- Winner, NSW Premier's History Fellowship (2005) ($20,000)
- Winner, NSW Premier's Literary Award for Non-Fiction (1990): The Snowy – The People Behind the Power, book
