= Julienne Marie =

American singer and actress (born 1937)

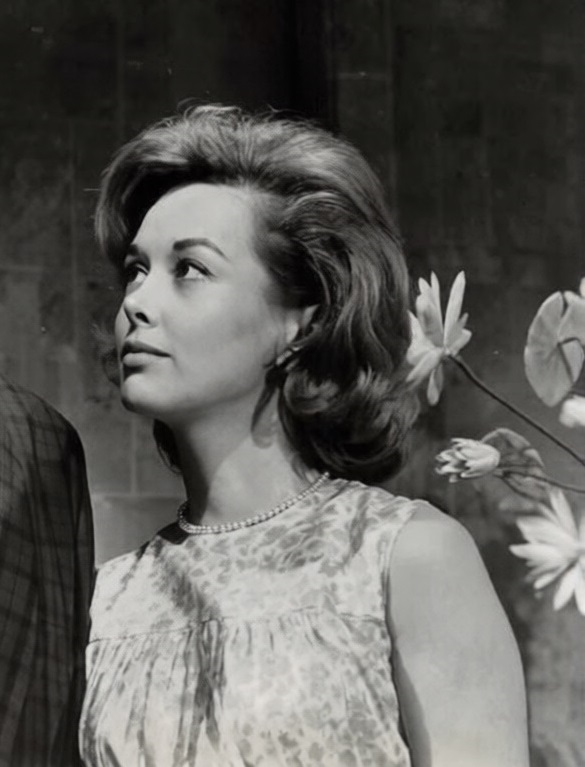
- Julienne Marie in 1965
- Born: Julianne Marie Hendricks; March 21, 1937 (age 89); Toledo, Ohio, U.S.
- Education: Juilliard School
- Occupations: Actress; singer
- Years active: 1950–1983
- Spouses: Gerald Kean (m. 1955; div. 1961); James Earl Jones (m. 1968; div. 1972); John Scanlon (m. 1974; died 2001)

Julienne Marie (née Julianne Marie Hendricks, March 21, 1937) is an American former actress and singer, best known for her work on the Broadway stage. In addition to her career in theater, Marie appeared in soap operas such as Our Private World (1965) and Ryan's Hope (1978).

== Biography ==
Julianne Marie Hendricks was born to John Hendricks, a chemist, and his wife Ethel (née Gyurko) in Toledo, Ohio. Her mother was a stage mother who pushed her into performing at a very young age. She was named for her paternal grandmother, Julia Hendricks. She dropped her last name and changed Julianne to Julienne, using her first and middle names to create her stage name (Julienne Marie), as she thought the surname Hendricks sounded "too Midwestern". During her school years, she took piano lessons and participated in local pageants. She moved from Toledo to New York with her family where she started voice training at Juilliard.

== Theatre ==
Marie made her Broadway debut in the original production of The King and I as the youngest of Yul Brynner's child brides. She received her first Tony Award nomination for Best Featured Actress in a Musical in 1959 for her portrayal of a young Indian maiden in Whoop-Up, which played 56 performances. Around 1960, she turned down a lead role in Lucille Ball's Wildcat to step into the original production of Gypsy as Louise, succeeding Sandra Church. Gypsy Rose Lee herself reportedly praised Julienne's performance. She performed 585 shows as Louise opposite Merman.

In 1963, Marie won a Theatre World award for her work in the off-Broadway revival of The Boys from Syracuse. In 1964, Julienne received her second Tony Award nomination for Best Featured Actress in a Musical for her work in Foxy starring Bert Lahr. Foxy played for 72 performances. In 1965, she starred in Do I Hear a Waltz?, alongside Elizabeth Allen; the show played 220 performances. Her final Broadway appearance came in 1980 for the musical Charlie and Algernon; the show played just 17 performances. In the late 1980s, she performed a cabaret act.

== Personal life ==
She first wed Gerald Kean, a writer in 1955; later divorcing him in 1961. She met James Earl Jones while he was performing as Othello in 1964. They married in 1968 and divorced in 1972. Marie said that her marriage to Jones ended because they were apart too much due to work and Jones wanted children and she did not. She met advertising executive John Scanlon in the early 1970s and they married in 1974, remaining married until his death in 2001 at age 66 from a heart attack. The couple were patrons for the Ireland-based organization Concern Worldwide. After Scanlon's death, she relocated for a time to a small village in France. Some time after retiring from show business, she established a career as a psychotherapist in the U.S.
