= Mayu Kanamori =

Australian photographer

Mayu Kanamori (金森マユ, Kanamori Mayu, born 1963 in Tokyo, Japan; migrated to Australia 1981) is an artist working mostly in photography, documentary photography, and still photography video art, often using photographic projection and story telling with emphasis on performance using interviews and narration.

Kanamori's earlier works deal with themes relating to subculture and minority groups, especially within Japan and Australia. Her later works deal with Australian and Japanese cross cultural and migrational issues, and her more recent works further these concerns by her attempt to spiritual connections with people and landscapes of both Australia and Japan.

== Photography ==
In 1996 at Japan Foundation Sydney Gallery, Kanamori first exhibited her series of documentary photographs of Japanese subcultures, Unseen Faces of Japan: photographs taken during her previous thee years in Japan, whilst working for Australian publications, The Sydney Morning Herald, The Age and The Good Weekend (Sydney Morning Herald). Whilst working as a freelance photographer and writer based in Sydney, Kanamori continues to document and exhibit photographs.

== Performance and photographic projection ==
Kanamori began creating her narrative works utilising audio interviews with The Heart of the Journey (2000) when she collaborated with ABC Radio National to produce a radio documentary about an Bardi-Jawi woman Lucy Dann from Broome, Western Australia, who was seeking to find her biological father Tamotsu Tsutsui. This radio feature programmed on Radio Eye received commendation in the 2000 United Nations Association of Australia Media Peace Awards in Promotions of Multicultural Issues. The Heart of the Journey was later produced in a performance context including projected photographs and live narration by the artist, and was presented by arts festivals throughout Austral-Asia.

Chika: A Documentary Performance (2005), a story about a Japanese tourist, Chika Honda, incarcerated in Australian prisons for a decade, combined sounds from Kanamori's radio documentary Chika (2004), live narration, projected photographs, live original music and dance. The radio feature Chika was finalist for 2004 Walkley Awards.

== Photography video art ==
Kanamori's video art works use series of still photographs as its base, and have included experimental works in collaboration with dancers and musicians whilst others include community based documentary work in collaboration with children and young people, as well as photographic essays with loose narratives such in Judy and Alan (2004), finalist for 2005 Harries National Digital Awards.
