= Please Don't Eat the Daisies =

1957 humor book by Jean Kerr

The first edition of Please Don't Eat the Daisies by Jean Kerr, published in 1957

Please Don't Eat the Daisies (New York: Doubleday, 1957) is a best-selling collection of humorous essays by American humorist and playwright Jean Kerr about suburban living and raising four boys. The essays do not have a plot or through-storyline, but the book sold so well it was adapted into a 1960 film starring Doris Day and David Niven. The film was later adapted into a 1965-1967 television series starring Patricia Crowley and Mark Miller. Kerr followed up this book with two later best-selling collections, The Snake Has All the Lines and Penny Candy.

== Contents ==
=== Introduction ===
The introduction serves as yet another humorous essay, as Kerr describes how she came to be a writer.

=== Please Don't Eat the Daisies ===
Kerr begins the book with her take on parenting four small boys.

=== How to Be a Collector's Item ===
The trials and tribulations of an author who hopes her letters are being collected for future publication.

=== Greenwich, Anyone? ===
Kerr's take on the popular trend of writers moving to the country to reconnect with nature.

=== How to Decorate in One Easy Breakdown ===
Kerr gives her own helpful hints on how to redecorate on a budget.

=== Dogs That Have Known Me ===
The author's experiences with dogs, large and small, through the years.

=== The Kerr-Hilton ===
One of the principal sources for the later film, this essay tells how Kerr and her husband acquired their house in Larchmont, New York, complete with gargoyles, secret panels, and a 24-bell carillon that played the duet from Carmen at noon.

=== The Care and Feeding of Producers ===
How to survive getting a play produced.

=== One Half of Two on the Aisle ===
Musings from the self-proclaimed most experienced audience member in America.

=== Don Brown's Body ===
A parody of Stephen Vincent Benét's "John Brown's Body", which mixes in Mike Hammer and gangsters.

=== Toujours Tristesse ===
A take-off of Francoise Sagan's A Certain Smile.

=== Snowflaketime ===
Kerr muses on the state of school productions of holiday shows through the years.

=== How to Get the Best of Your Children ===
Another essay on the joys of parenting.

=== Where Did You Put the Aspirin? ===
Again, Kerr muses on coping with children.

=== Aunt Jean's Marshmallow Fudge Diet ===
One of many essays Kerr wrote on the subject of diets and dieting.

=== Operation Operation ===
Kerr's take on hospital stays, doctors, nurses, and the need to insist on patients' rights.

=== Index ===
In yet another satirical jab, Kerr included an index in the book, but with only the page numbers from the original magazines in which the pieces appeared.

== Reception ==
The book achieved the number one spot on The New York Times bestseller list in February, 1958. Kerr's "wryly observant style" reminded Washington Post critic Richard L. Coe of James Thurber, E. B. White, and Cornelia Otis Skinner.

Kirkus Reviews called her "funny and refreshing" and "incisive."

== Adaptations ==
In 1960, Metro-Goldwyn-Mayer released a film adapted from the book, directed by Charles Walters with a screenplay by Isobel Lennart. It starred Doris Day, David Niven, Janis Paige, Spring Byington, Richard Haydn, Patsy Kelly, and Jack Weston. A storyline was created for the film, involving Day as Kate Robinson Mackay, a housewife married to Lawrence "Larry" Mackay (Niven), a newly hired New York City drama critic. In his first assignment, Larry must review a new show produced by his best friend, and he is forced to pan it. Meanwhile, a search for a new home for the family—who ultimately settle in the fictional rural town of Hooton—leaves Kate dealing with the kids, carpenters, decorators, and the new neighbors by herself.

The film was in turn adapted as a television series that ran from 1965 to 1967 (58 half-hour episodes) starring Patricia Crowley and Mark Miller as Joan Nash, a newspaper columnist, and John Nash, a college professor, raising their four sons in fictional Ridgemont, New York.
