= Alfred Jaretzki =

Alfred Jaretzki may refer to:

- Alfred Jaretzki Jr. (1892–1976), American lawyer and an expert on investment companies
- Alfred Jaretzki III (1919–2014), American surgeon and medical professor
