= List of Pulitzer Prize Playhouse episodes =

This is a list of episodes for the television series Pulitzer Prize Playhouse.

== Series overview ==
Season	Episodes	Originally released	
Season	Episodes	First released	Last released
1	39	October 6, 1950	1952
2	13	December 19, 1951	June 4, 1952

== Episodes ==
=== Season 1 (1950–51) ===
No. overall	No. in season	Title	Cast	Directed by	Written by	Original release date
1	1	"You Can't Take It with You"	Charles Coburn, Ella Raines	Alex Segal	Moss Hart (play); George S. Kaufman (play)	October 6, 1950
2	2	"The Canton Story"	Royal Dano, Kurt Katch, Paul Mann	Lawrence Carra	Budd Schulberg (teleplay)	October 13, 1950
3	3	"Abe Lincoln in Illinois"	Raymond Massey, Betty Field, Kevin McCarthy	Alex Segal	Robert E. Sherwood (play)	October 20, 1950
4	4	"The Late Christopher Bean"	Helen Hayes, Charles Dingle, Elizabeth Patterson	Lawrence Carra	Sidney Howard (play)	October 27, 1950
5	5	"The Magnificent Ambersons"	Melvyn Douglas, Florence Eldridge, Ruth Hussey	Lawrence Carra	Booth Tarkington (novel)	November 3, 1950
6	6	"The Raven"	John Howard, Murvyn Vye, Anne Sargent	Lawrence Carra	Marquis James (story)	November 10, 1950
7	7	"Knickerbocker Holiday"	John Raitt, Doretta Morrow, Dennis King	Lawrence Carra	Maxwell Anderson (book); Washington Irving (inspired by "Knickerbocker History of New York")	November 17, 1950
8	8	"The End Game"	Barry Nelson, Richard Derr, Mary Sinclair	Lawrence Carra	J. P. Marquand (story)	November 24, 1950
9	9	"Our Town"	Elizabeth Patterson, Charles Dingle, Edward Arnold	Lawrence Carra	Thornton Wilder (play)	December 1, 1950
10	10	"The Ponzi Story"	Coleen Gray, Hume Cronyn, Jonathan Harris	Lawrence Carra	-	December 8, 1950
11	11	"Bethel Merriday"	Barbara Bel Geddes, Phillip Reed, Betty Garde	Lawrence Carra	Sinclair Lewis (play)	December 15, 1950
12	12	"The Pharmacist's Mate"	Gene Raymond, Darryl Hickman, Harold Lloyd Jr.	Lawrence Carra	Budd Schulberg (teleplay); George Weller (story)	December 22, 1950
13	13	"Mrs. January and Mr. Ex"	Spring Byington, Penny Singleton, Douglas Fairbanks	Lawrence Carra	Zoe Akins (play)	December 29, 1950
14	14	"Portrait of a President"	Walter Hampden, Fay Bainter, Harriet MacGibbon	Lawrence Carra	Marquis James (story)	January 5, 1951
15	15	"Ned McCobb's Daughter"	Charles Dingle, Miriam Hopkins, Anthony Quinn	Lawrence Carra	Sidney Howard (play)	January 12, 1951
16	16	"Light Up the Sky"	Patricia Morison, Lee Tracy, Tom Helmore	Lawrence Carra	Moss Hart (play)	January 19, 1951
17	17	"The Silver Cord"	Judith Anderson, Joan Chandler, Joanne Dru	Lawrence Carra	Sidney Howard (play)	January 26, 1951
18	18	"Alison's House"	Otto Kruger, Madge Evans, Cloris Leachman	Lawrence Carra	Susan Glaspell (play)	February 2, 1951
19	19	"Broken Dishes"	Robert Stack, James Dunn, Marcia Henderson	Charles S. Dubin	Martin Flavin (play)	February 9, 1951
20	20	"Mary of Scotland"	Helen Hayes, Mildred Natwick, John Emery	Lawrence Carra	Maxwell Anderson (play)	February 16, 1951
21	21	"Valley Forge"	Wright King, Victor Sutherland, Frank Thomas	Lawrence Carra	Maxwell Anderson (play)	February 23, 1951
22	22	"The Wisdom Tooth"	Jean Parker, Howard Freeman, Jonathan Harris	Lawrence Carra	Marc Connelly (play)	March 2, 1951
23	23	"The Haunted House"	Barbara Britton, Constance Dowling, Jack Lemmon	Lawrence Carra	Owen Davis (play)	March 1951
24	24	"The Royal Family"	Florence Reed, Hugh Franklin, Olive Blakeney	Lawrence Carra	Edna Ferber (play); George S. Kaufman (play)	March 1951
25	25	"Blockade"	Vanessa Brown, Robert Pastene, John Buckmaster	Lawrence Carra	J. P. Marquand (story); John Howard Lawson (teleplay)	March 1951
26	26	"The Just and the Unjust"	Jan Sterling, Charles Dingle, Richard Kiley	Lawrence Carra	James Gould Cozzens (writer)	1951
27	27	"Night Over Taos"	Riza Royce, Murvyn Vye, Peggy Conklin	Lawrence Carra	Maxwell Anderson (play)	April 1951
28	28	"Icebound"	Charles Dingle, Nina Foch, Edmond O'Brien	Lawrence Carra	Owen Davis (story)	April 1951
29	29	"Rebellion in Jackson County"	Everett Sloane, Valerie Bettis, James Dunn	Lawrence Carra	Jeffrey Max Lalande (writer)	April 1951
30	30	"Second Threshold"	Clive Brook, Hugh Reilly, Betsy von Furstenberg	Lawrence Carra	Philip Barry (play)	April 1951
31	31	"The Happy Journey"	Jack Lemmon, Wanda Hendrix, Spring Byington	Lawrence Carra	Thornton Wilder (story)	May 1951
32	32	"The Thousand Yard Look"	Biff McGuire, Edward Andrews, Richard Kiley	Lawrence Carra	Hal Boyle (writer)	May 1951
33	33	"The Queen's Husband"	Roland Young, Barbara Baxley, William Redfield	Alex Segal	Felix Jackson (adaptation); Robert E. Sherwood (play)	May 1951
34	34	"The Stolen City"	Wright King, Ruth Hammond, Robert P. Lieb	Lawrence Carra	-	May 1951
35	35	"Detour"	Dorothy Gish, William Harrigan	Lawrence Carra	Owen Davis (story)	June 1951
36	36	"Hostage"	Paul Porter, Donald Devlin, Scott Marlowe	Lawrence Carra	-	June 1951
37	37	"The Buccaneer"	Brian Aherne, Nina Foch	Lawrence Carra	Maxwell Anderson (play); Laurence Stallings (play)	June 1951
38	38	"(a) The Pen (b) You're Not the Type (c) The Weak Spot"	Edna Best, Sidney Blackmer, Edward Binns	Lawrence Carra	John Hersey (story); Edna Ferber (story); George Kelly (story)	June 1951
39	39	"The Big Break"	Lynn Bari, James Dunn	Lawrence Carra	Moss Hart (play)	1951

=== Season 2 (1951–52) ===
No. overall	No. in season	Title	Cast	Directed by	Written by	Original release date
40	1	"The Skin of Our Teeth"	Nina Foch, Thomas Mitchell, Mildred Natwick	Lawrence Carra	Thornton Wilder (story)	December 19, 1951
41	2	"Alison's House"	Ruth Chatterton, Otto Kruger	Lawrence Carra	Susan Glaspell (story)	January 2, 1952
42	3	"The Town"	John Forsythe, Joseph Hardy, Aline MacMahon	Lawrence Carra	Conrad Richter (novel)	January 16, 1952
43	4	"Years of Grace"	Ann Harding, Lucile Watson, Joan Chandler	Lawrence Carra	Margaret Ayer Barnes (novel)	January 30, 1952
44	5	"Hill 346: A Report on Korea"	Philip Bourneuf, Philip Coolidge, Vaughn Taylor	Lawrence Carra	Norman Lessing (story)	February 13, 1952
45	6	"Melville Goodwin, U.S.A."	Margalo Gillmore, Paul Kelly, Jayne Meadows	Lawrence Carra	John P. Marquand (story)	February 27, 1952
46	7	"Monsieur Beaucaire"	Anna Lee, Vincent Price, Audrey Meadows	Lawrence Carra	Booth Tarkington (story)	March 12, 1952
47	8	"Robert E. Lee"	Robert Keith, Ilka Chase	Lawrence Carra	James A. Michener (story)	March 26, 1952
48	9	"The Jungle"	Nina Foch, Hanna Landy, Robert Preston	Lawrence Carra	-	April 9, 1952
49	10	"The Fascinating Stranger"	Thomas Mitchell, Polly Rowles	Lawrence Carra	Booth Tarkington (story)	April 23, 1952
50	11	"The Return of Mr. Moto"	James Daly, Eva Gabor, Harold Vermilyea	Lawrence Carra	John P. Marquand (story)	May 7, 1952
51	12	"The American Leonardo: The Life of Samuel F.B. Morse"	John Forsythe, Wanda Hendrix, Hanna Landy	Lawrence Carra	Carleton Mabee (story)	May 12, 1952
52	13	"Daisy Mayme"	June Havoc, Hanna Landy, Shepperd Strudwick	Lawrence Carra	George Kelly (play)	June 4, 1952
