= Pulitzer Prize Playhouse =

American anthology television series (1950–1952)

- Oakland Tribune ad (January 30, 1952)
- Genre: Drama; Anthology
- Written by: Maxwell Anderson; Sidney Howard; George S. Kaufman
- Directed by: Lawrence Carra; Charles S. Dubin; Alex Segal
- Presented by: Elmer Davis
- Narrated by: Elmer Davis
- Composer: Kurt Weill
- Country of origin: United States
- Original language: English
- No. of seasons: 2
- No. of episodes: 53 (list of episodes)

Production
- Running time: 47–50 minutes (October 1950 – June 1951); 24–25 minutes (December 1951 – June 1952)

Original release
- Network: ABC
- Release: October 6, 1950 – June 4, 1952

Pulitzer Prize Playhouse is an American drama anthology television series which offered adaptations of Pulitzer Prize-winning plays, novels, and stories. The journalist Elmer Davis was the host and narrator of this 1950–1952 ABC series.

== Sponsor ==
Sponsored by the Joseph Schlitz Brewing Company, the 60-minute show opened with theme music by Bernard Green. Columbia University's Pulitzer School of Journalism, which made the annual Pulitzer awards, benefited from its agreement with Schlitz and ABC, receiving $100,000 from Schlitz for its cooperation. However, the show made no mention of Columbia or the Pulitzer School of Journalism.

== Productions and performers ==
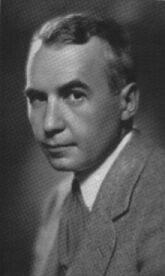
Elmer Davis was host and narrator of the series.

Plays in the first season included You Can't Take It with You (the initial telecast), The Magnificent Ambersons and Our Town. The second season productions included Ah, Wilderness and The Skin of Our Teeth. Actors in these shows included Spring Byington, Charles Dingle, James Dunn, Nina Foch, John Forsythe, Helen Hayes, Wanda Hendrix, Wright King, Otto Kruger, Joan McCracken, Thomas Mitchell, Mildred Natwick, Gene Raymond, Kent Smith and Fredd Wayne. Lighting design was by Imero Fiorentino. The announcer was Nelson Case.

== Advertising controversy ==
The series began October 6, 1950, and a month later it came under criticism from the Woman's Christian Temperance Union, which objected to the tie-in between Schlitz and the Pulitzer Prize. Mrs. D. Leigh Colvin, president of the WCTU, suggested that Columbia should return the $100,000, stating that the program was "a scheme of education for alcoholism which uses American classics as a springboard for beer promotion. The tie-up... allies the university, its school and the Pulitzer name with programs which are obviously put on by the brewer to promote drinking in the American home. Beer bottles and beer drinking have been rampant in commercials between acts, one recent commercial depicting Mona Lisa coming to life from her painting to reach for a glass of the sponsor's beer."

Dean Carl W. Ackerman of the Pulitzer School responded, "This has been a pioneering development in the relationship between industry and education. It is raising the standards of entertainment in American homes. Any development which contributes to the improvement of home life is wholesome because the home is the bulwark of democracy."

Schlitz president Erwin C. Uilein pointed out that Vassar College was founded in 1861 by Matthew Vassar who had made a fortune in his Poughkeepsie, New York brewery.

== Graphic design and formats ==
The opening title card displayed a painted design of comedy/tragedy masks with a quill pen positioned in the mouth of the tragedy mask. Advertising for the series also used comedy/tragedy masks but in a more simplified line-art version minus the quill pen.

The series was telecast live, but in some areas it was shown two weeks later as captured on kinescope film. It initially presented hour-long dramas from October 1950 to June 1951; the series was reduced to a 30-minute format from December 1951 to June 1952. During the second season, the series alternated with Celanese Theater. Pulitzer Prize Playhouse continued until June 4, 1952, producing a total of 53 episodes.

== Production ==
Edgar Peterson was the producer, with Lawrence Carrà, Alex Segal and Frank Telford as directors. Bernie Green directed the music. The program originated from WJZ-TV.

== Awards and nominations ==
| Year | Award | Result | Category | Recipient |
|---|---|---|---|---|
| 1951 | Emmy Award | Won | Best Dramatic Show | – |
| 1952 | Emmy Award | Nominated | Best Dramatic Show | – |

== Episodes ==
Partial List of Episodes of Pulitzer Prize Playhouse
| Date | Episode | Actor(s) |
|---|---|---|
| October 6, 1950 | "You Can't Take It With You" | Charles Coburn, Ella Raines |
| October 27, 1950 | "The Late Christopher Bean" | Helen Hayes, Charles Dingle, Bethel Leslie |
| November 3, 1950 | "The Magnificent Ambersons" | Melvyn Douglas, Ruth Hussey, Donald Woods, Florence Eldridge |
| November 23, 1950 | "The Raven" | Zachary Scott |
| December 1, 1950 | "Our Town" | Edward Arnold, Betty Caulfield, Charles Dingle, Biff McGuire, Una O'Connor, Dorothy Peterson, Laura Weber |
| December 8, 1950 | "The Ponzi Story" | Hume Cronyn, Colleen Gray, Blanche Yurka, Quentin Reynolds, Jonathan Harris, Will Kuluva, Walter Brooke. |
| December 22, 1950 | "The Pharmacist's Mate" | Brian Donlevy, Gene Raymond, Darryl Hickman, Alan Hale Jr. |
| December 29, 1950 | "Mrs. January and Mr. Ex" | Spring Byington, Melvyn Douglas, Douglas Fairbanks Jr., Penny Singleton, Jacqueline deWit |
| January 26, 1951 | "The Silver Cord" | Judith Anderson, Joanne Dru, Joan Chandler, Denholm Elliott, James Lipton |
| February 2, 1951 | "Alison's House" | Cloris Leachman, Otto Kruger, Madge Evans |
| February 9, 1951 | "Broken Dishes" | James Dunn (actor), Robert Stack, Marcia Henderson |
| March 30, 1951 | "The Just and the Unjust" | June Lockhart, Richard Kiley, Charles Dingle, Jan Sterling |
| April 13, 1951 | "Icebound" | Edmond O'Brien, Nina Foch, Charles Dingle |
| April 20, 1951 | "Rebellion in Jackson County" | James Dunn (actor), Everett Sloane, Muriel Kirkland |
| May 4, 1951 | "The Happy Journey" | Spring Byington, Jack Lemmon, Wanda Hendrix |
| June 1, 1951 | "Detour" | Joan Chandler, Dorothy Gish |
| June 15, 1951 | "The Buccaneer" | Brian Aherne, Nina Foch, Walter Burke |
| December 19, 1951 | "The Skin of Our Teeth" | Thomas Mitchell, Nina Foch, Peggy Wood, Mildred Natwick |
| January 2, 1952 | "Alison's House | Ruth Chatterton, Otto Kruger |
| January 16, 1952 | "The Town" | Joan Copeland, John Forsythe, Aline MacMahon |
| January 30, 1952 | "Years of Grace" | Joan Chandler, Ann Harding, Lucille Watson |
| February 13, 1952 | "Hill 346" | Phillip Borneuf, Vaughn Taylor, Philip Coolidge |
| February 27, 1952 | "Melville Goodwin, U.S.A." | Walter Brooke, Margalo Gillmore, Paul Kelly (actor), Jayne Meadows |
| March 12, 1952 | "Monsieur Beaucaire" | Ann Lee, Audrey Meadows, Vincent Price |
| March 26, 1952 | "Robert E. Lee" | Ilka Chase, Robert Keith (actor) |
| April 9, 1952 | "The Jungle" | Nina Foch, Robert Preston (actor), Kent Smith |
| April 23, 1952 | "The Fascinating Stranger" | Thomas Mitchell (actor), Polly Rowles |
| May 7, 1952 | "The Return of Mr. Moto" | James Daly (actor), Eva Gabor, Harold Vermilyea |
| May 21, 1952 | "The American Leonardo: The Life of Samuel F.B. Morse" | John Forsythe, Wanda Hendrix, Gene Raymond |
