= Irène Bordoni filmography =

This is a list of movies with singer Irène Bordoni.

== Silent movies ==
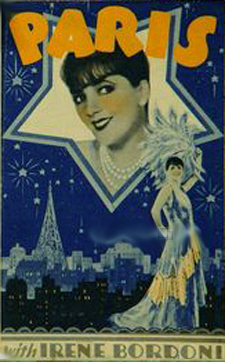
Poster for Paris. Irène Bodoni's first talkie.

Title	Year	Color	Role	Notes
Pierrot aime les roses (short)	1910	Black and White	Role unknown	Irène Bordoni's first film. Unknown if a copy survives.
Le club des élégants (short)	1912	Black and White	Role unknown	Unknown if a copy survives.
La légende des tulipes d'or (short)	1912	Black and White	Role unknown	Unknown if a copy survives.
Le miracle des fleurs (short)	1912	Black and White	Role unknown	Unknown if a copy survives.
Le secret du châtelain (short)	1914	Black and White	Role unknown	Unknown if a copy survives.
Le traquenard (short)	1915	Black and White	Role unknown	Unknown if a copy survives.

== Talking movies ==
In 1929, Irène Bordoni made two movies with Warner Bros., Paris and The Show of Shows, but the studio concluded that Paris wasn't grossing that much, so it decided to stop making movies with her. She continued making a few other movies with small roles, but never became a big star.

Title	Year	Color	Role	Notes
Paris	1929	Black and White, part color (Technicolor)	Vivienne Rolland	Irène Bordoni's first sound movie (Vitaphone). Also her first of second movies with The Warner Brothers. This is today a lost film with only the surviving sound disc and a fragment of film lasting slightly over a minute.
The Show of Shows	1929	Black and White, part color (Technicolor)	Herself	Her second and last movie with Warner Bros. Only survives in black and white except The Chinese Fantasy Scene introduced by Rin Tin Tin with Nick Lucas and Myrna Loy. Irène Bordoni's scene was in Technicolor A fragment lasting a few seconds survives.
Just a Gigalo (cartoon short)	1932	Black and White	Herself	Betty Boop cartoon. Cartoon still survives and is not a lost film.
Du Barry Did All Right (short)	1937	Black and White	Irene Wainwright	A Vitaphone short.
Louisiana Purchase	1941	Black and White	Madame Yvonne Bordelaise	Bordoni was 4th billed, the movie starred Bob Hope.

== See also ==
Sound-on-disc
