= Patricia Dane =

American actress (1917–1995)

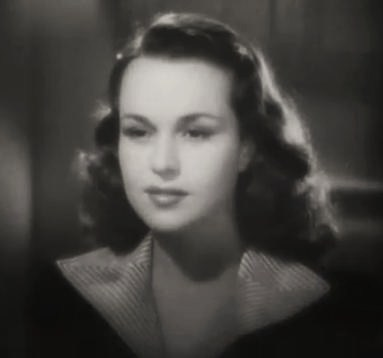
- Dane in Life Begins for Andy Hardy (1941)
- Born: Thelma Patricia Pippins; August 4, 1917; Florida, U.S.
- Died: June 5, 1995 (aged 77); Blountstown, Florida, U.S.
- Resting place: Pine Memorial Cemetery, Blountstown, Florida
- Occupation: Actress
- Years active: 1941–1956
- Spouse: Tommy Dorsey (m. 1943; div. 1947)

Patricia Dane (born Thelma Patricia Pippins, August 4, 1917 – June 5, 1995) was an American film actress of the 1940s.

== Early life ==
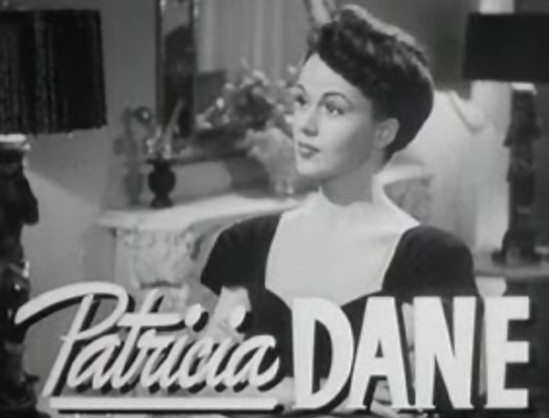
Patricia Dane in the trailer for Grand Central Murder (1942)

Dane was born Thelma Patricia Pippins to William Pippins and Emma F. Montford. Sources differ as to her birth year (1917 - 1919) and birthplace (Jacksonville, Florida or Blountstown, Florida). She was later known as Thelma Patricia Burns and Thelma Patricia Byrnes after her mother's second husband, whose surname was Burns. She attended the University of Alabama for almost three years. In 1938 she moved to New York, where she worked as a model for a dress design firm. During this period she met industrialist and film industry executive Howard Hughes, who encouraged her to move to Los Angeles and helped her find an apartment there.

== Career ==
Dane was signed to a Metro-Goldwyn-Mayer contract in 1941. As she gained attention in Hollywood, gossip columnists Louella Parsons and Jimmy Fidler both noted her strong resemblance to Hedy Lamarr, who was also under contract to MGM. Dane's earliest appearances were two uncredited roles in Ziegfeld Girl and I'll Wait for You (both 1941). She played the part of "Jennitt Hicks" in Life Begins for Andy Hardy (1941) and her well-received performance earned her a long-term contract. Dane played "Garnet" in Johnny Eager (1942) directed by Mervyn LeRoy. The film starred Robert Taylor and Lana Turner. Dane received favorable press for her acting in Grand Central Murder (1942), in which she was billed second to Van Heflin.

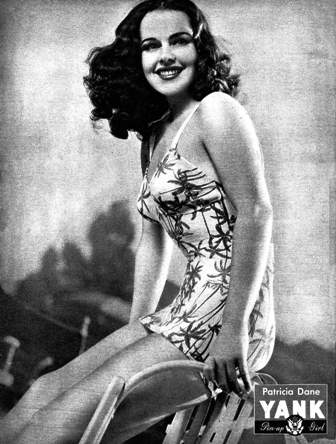
Patricia Dane in Yank, the Army Weekly

Dane married bandleader Tommy Dorsey in Las Vegas on April 8, 1943. Dorsey did not want his wife to work, and she took a break from her film career. Her MGM contract lapsed in 1945.

Dorsey's biographer described both parties to the marriage as temperamental. Their union was said to be "tempestuous from the start." They separated three times before Dane filed for divorce on July 3, 1947, citing "extreme mental cruelty" and Dorsey's constant travel with his touring orchestra. However, the divorce was essentially amicable, and they had various rendezvous in the years ahead.

Following her divorce, Dane resumed her movie career at the low-budget Monogram Pictures studio with Joe Palooka in Fighting Mad (1948). Her final film appearances were uncredited parts in Road to Bali (1952) and The Harder They Fall (1956).

== Later life ==
Tommy Dorsey died in 1956. He left Dane a $26,000 insurance policy after she informed him that she was unable to work due to injuries sustained in a 1956 boating accident. In 1973 she returned to Blountstown, where she lived with her mother and worked as a librarian. Dane never remarried. She is interred in Pine Memorial Cemetery in Blountstown, Florida.

== Filmography ==
Year	Title	Role	Notes
1941	Ziegfeld Girl	Ziegfeld Girl	Uncredited
1941	I'll Wait for You	Blonde in Elevator	Uncredited
1941	Life Begins for Andy Hardy	Jennitt Hicks	
1941	Johnny Eager	Garnet	
1942	Rio Rita	Lucette Brunswick	
1942	Grand Central Murder	Mida King	
1942	Somewhere I'll Find You	Crystal McRegan	
1942	Northwest Rangers	Jean Avery	
1943	I Dood It	Suretta Brenton	
1948	Joe Palooka in Fighting Mad	Iris March	
1948	Are You with It?	Sally	
1952	Road to Bali	Handmaiden	Uncredited
1956	The Harder They Fall	Shirley	Uncredited, (final film role)

== See also ==
- Pin-ups of Yank, the Army Weekly
- Tampa Bay Times, The Great Dane, July 20, 1941, Page 62.
- Central New Jersey Home News, Meet the Stars, August 31, 1941, Page 8.
- Oakland, California Tribune, If the Dane's Not Great She Can Always Design Clothes, June 14, 1942, Page 65.
- Oakland Tribune, On the First Rung of the Ladder of Fame, January 24, 1943, Page 42.
- Long Beach, California, Release Attachment on Patricia Dane's Salary, Friday, August 18, 1944, Page 21.
- Daily News, Los Angeles, Bob Walker Pleads Guilty in Drunk Case, October 22, 1948, Page 1.
- Olivia R. Vickery, 1st cousin and owner of her effects after her death.
