= Under Ten Flags =

1960 film

- Italian film poster
- Directed by: Duilio Coletti
- Written by: Vittoriano Petrilli; Duilio Coletti; Ulrich Möhr
- Produced by: Dino De Laurentiis
- Starring: Van Heflin; Charles Laughton; Mylène Demongeot
- Cinematography: Aldo Tonti
- Edited by: Jerry Webb
- Music by: Nino Rota
- Production company: Dino de Laurentiis Cinematografica
- Distributed by: Paramount Pictures (US)
- Release dates: 15 September 1960 (US); 21 September 1960 (Italy)
- Running time: 92 minutes
- Countries: Italy; United States
- Language: English
- Box office: $1 million (US/Canada)

Under Ten Flags (Italian: Sotto dieci bandiere) is a 1960 Italian-American war film directed by Duilio Coletti and starring Van Heflin, Charles Laughton, and Mylène Demongeot. It was entered into the 10th Berlin International Film Festival.

== Plot ==
Loosely based on actual events during World War II, the film depicts real-life German Captain Bernhard Rogge commanding the navy raider Atlantis, which from May 1940 to November 1941 sank 22 Allied merchant ships. The story alternates between scenes at the Admiralty and scenes at sea, particularly showing Captain Rogge's humanity and chivalrous conduct of his military engagements. Rogge was one of the few German flag rank officers who was not arrested by the Allies after the war, due to his conduct as a military officer in commanding Atlantis. After eighteen months of successful raids, Atlantis is sunk on 22 November 1941 by the British cruiser Devonshire.

== Cast ==
- Van Heflin as Captain Bernhard Rogge
- Charles Laughton as Admiral Russell
- Mylène Demongeot as Zizi
- John Ericson as Krüger
- Cecil Parker as Col. Howard
- Folco Lulli as Paco
- Alex Nicol as Knoche
- Liam Redmond as Windsor
- Eleonora Rossi Drago as Elsa
- John Lee
- Ralph Truman as Adm. Benson
- Grégoire Aslan as Master of Abdullah
- Peter Carsten as Lt. Mohr
- Helmut Schmid
- Gian Maria Volonté as Samuel Braunstein (as Gianmaria Volonté)
