= Grand Central Murder =

1942 film by S. Sylvan Simon

- theatrical poster
- Directed by: S. Sylvan Simon
- Written by: Sue MacVeigh (novel); Peter Ruric
- Produced by: B. F. Zeidman
- Starring: Van Heflin; Patricia Dane; Sam Levene
- Cinematography: George J. Folsey
- Edited by: Conrad A. Nervig
- Music by: David Snell
- Distributed by: Metro-Goldwyn-Mayer
- Release date: May 23, 1942 (New York City)
- Running time: 73 minutes
- Country: United States
- Language: English
- Budget: $250,000
- Box office: $515,000

Grand Central Murder is a comedy/mystery film released in 1942. It was based on Sue MacVeigh's 1939 novel of the same name, and stars Van Heflin as a private investigator who is one of the suspects in a murder on a private train car in Grand Central Terminal. The film was directed by S. Sylvan Simon.

== Plot ==
Convicted murderer "Turk" (Stephen McNally) escapes from police custody, crashing through a washroom window as a train pulls into Grand Central Terminal in New York. He telephones his former girlfriend, Broadway star Mida King (Patricia Dane), and threatens to kill her. She leaves her show between acts and hides in a private train car on a siding at the terminal, planning to leave town and marry her rich, high society fiancé, David V. Henderson (Mark Daniels). However, her body is found by David and his ex-fiancée, Connie Furness (Cecilia Parker).

Police Inspector Gunther (Sam Levene) is called in to solve the crime. The doctor at the scene is unable to determine the cause of death. Turk is recaptured, and wisecracking private detective "Rocky" Custer (Van Heflin), whom Turk had hired, is also brought in, as he had helped his client evade the police. Other suspects are rounded up: Mida's greedy phony psychic stepfather Ramon (Roman Bohnen); her ex-husband Paul Rinehart (George Lynn), who works at the terminal; and her producer Frankie Ciro (Tom Conway). Also mixed in are Mida's maid, ex-burlesque singer Pearl Delroy (Connie Gilchrist) and her daughter "Baby" (Betty Wells), Mida's understudy. Then Roger Furness (Samuel S. Hinds), Connie's wealthy and influential father—chairman of the board of the railroad—shows up to guard his daughter's interests. Gunther gets each to tell what they know, with the unwelcome assistance of Rocky.

It turns out that the victim was a calculating gold digger. Like the inspiration of her stage name, King Midas, everything (or rather every man) she touched, turned to gold for her purse. She had used each successive boyfriend as a stepping stone, then discarded each in turn, in her climb up the social ladder. Landing millionaire David was to have been her crowning achievement, the fulfillment of her lifelong ambition. Frankie finds her, but she calms his anger at the prospect of losing the star of his expensive production by telling him that she plans to get a rich divorce settlement in about six months, more than enough to finance an even more lavish show. This conversation is overheard by David, giving him a motive. During the investigation, Ramon dies, apparently of a weak heart.

Rocky is able to solve the case and show that Ramon too had been murdered. The killer electrocuted Mida while she was in the shower of the locked railway car by connecting the plumbing to the electrified third rail. When he went to return the wiring to the storage locker, he was spotted by Ramon. The murderer paid Ramon off, but later got rid of the loose end with poison. Rocky identifies the man as Roger Furness, who breaks away and jumps aboard a departing train, but falls to his own death on the third rail.

== Cast ==
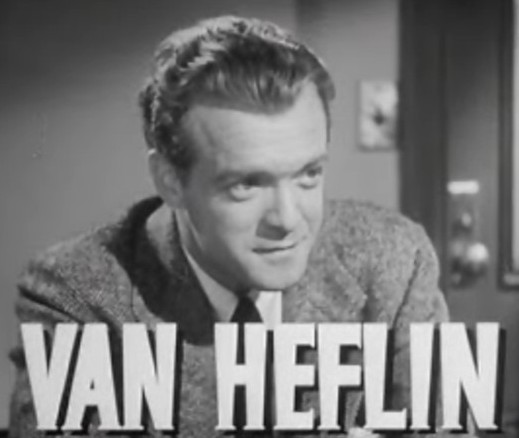
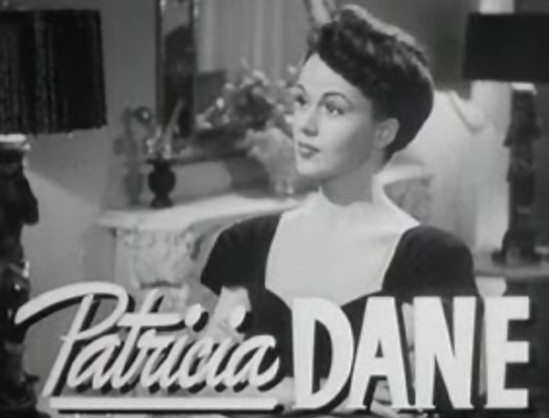
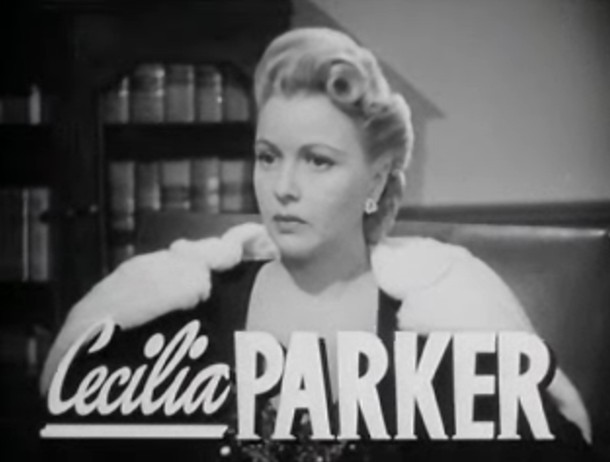
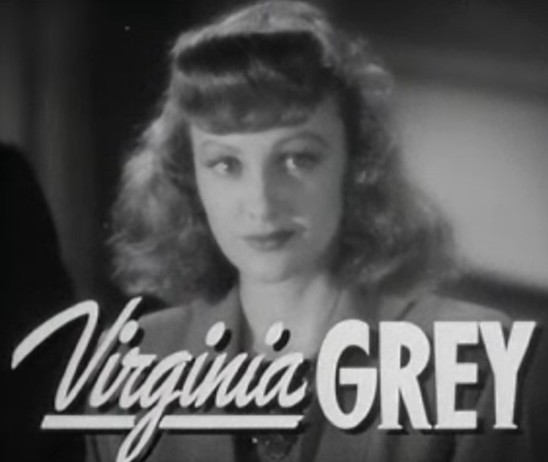
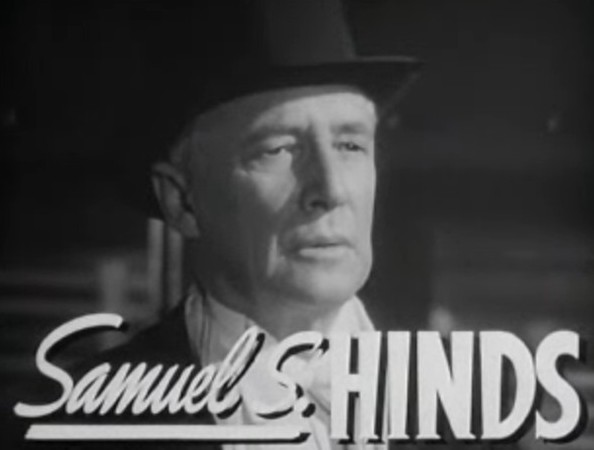
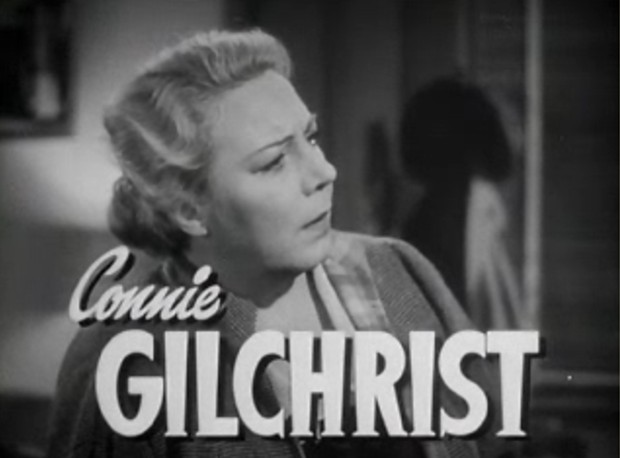
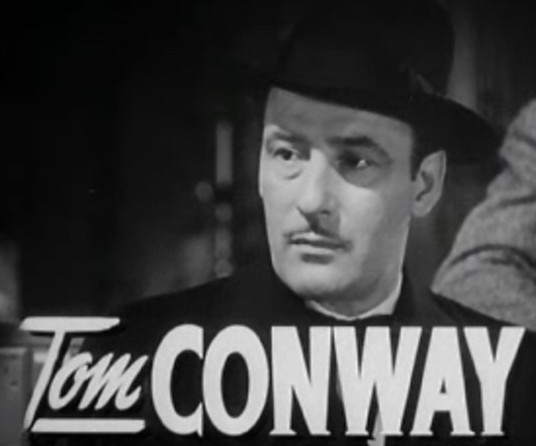
Van Heflin as "Rocky" Custer
Patricia Dane as Mida King
Cecilia Parker as Constance Furness
Virginia Grey as Sue Custer, Rocky's wife
Samuel S. Hinds as Roger Furness
Connie Gilchrist as Pearl Delroy
Tom Conway as Frankie Ciro

- Sam Levene as Inspector Gunther
- Mark Daniels as David V. Henderson
- Stephen McNally as "Turk"
- Betty Wells as "Baby" Delroy
- George Lynn as Paul Rinehart
- Roman Bohnen as Ramon
- Millard Mitchell as Detective Arthur Doolin

Cast notes

- Stephen McNally made his film debut in Grand Central Murder under the name "Horace McNally".
- Sam Levene, who was the original "Nathan Detroit" in Guys and Dolls on Broadway, often portrayed police investigators who played second-fiddle to private investigators. He performed that function several times in the Thin Man series.

== Production ==
Grand Central Murder is a sequel of sorts to Kid Glove Killer, in which Van Heflin played a similar part. Donna Reed and Reginald Owen were originally cast in the film, but were replaced. The film was in production at MGM's studios in Culver City, California from 19 February to 13 March 1942.

== Reception ==
The film premiered in New York City on 23 May of that year. According to MGM records it earned $297,000 in the US and Canada and $220,000 elsewhere, making the studio a profit of $86,000.
