= Life Begins for Andy Hardy =

1941 film by George B. Seitz

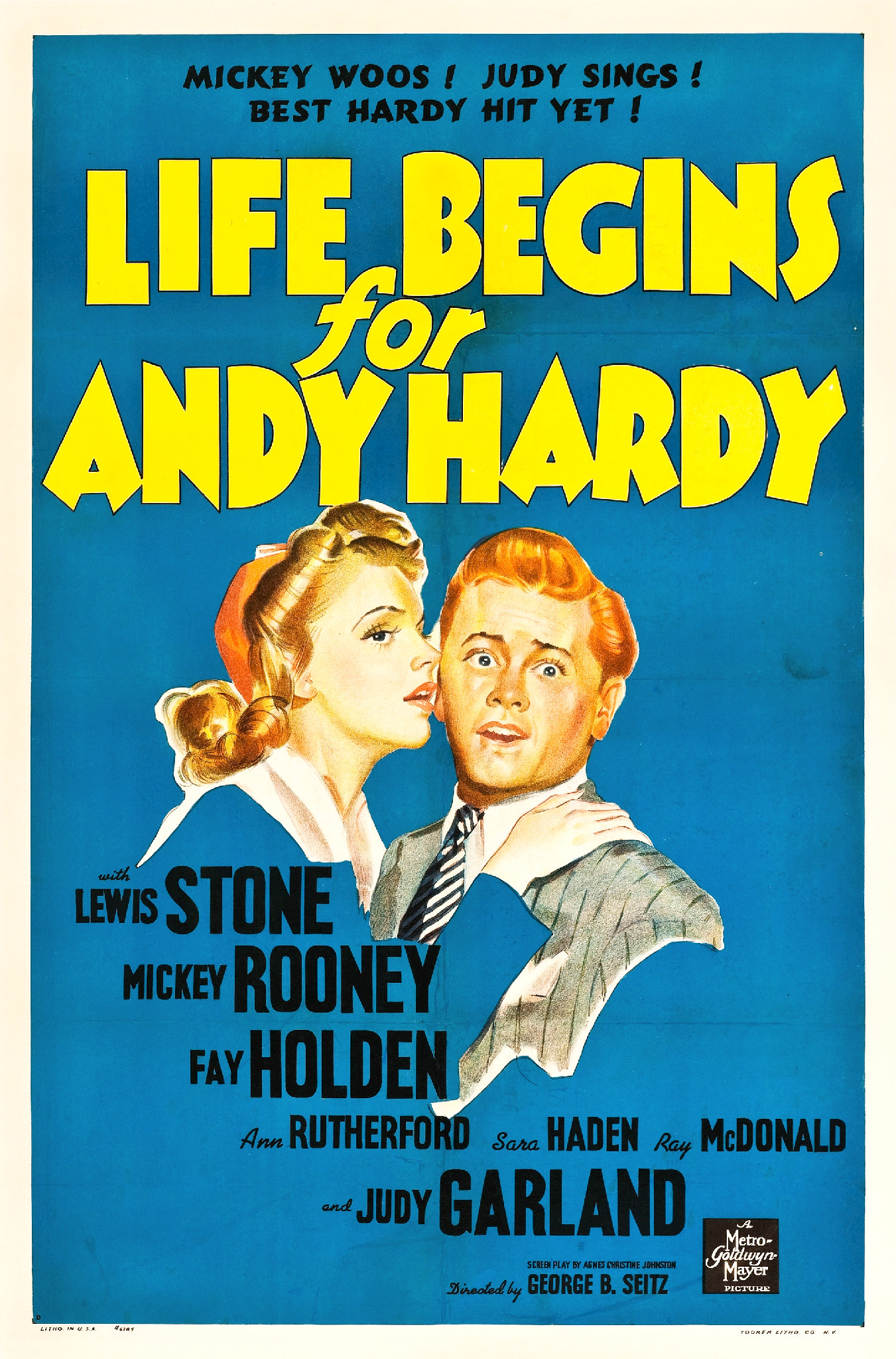
- Theatrical release poster
- Directed by: George B. Seitz
- Written by: Agnes Christine Johnston; Aurania Rouverol
- Produced by: Carey Wilson
- Starring: Mickey Rooney; Lewis Stone; Judy Garland; Ann Rutherford; Fay Holden
- Cinematography: Lester White
- Edited by: Elmo Veron
- Music by: Georgie Stoll
- Production company: Metro-Goldwyn-Mayer
- Distributed by: Loew's Inc.
- Release date: August 15, 1941
- Running time: 100 minutes
- Country: United States
- Language: English
- Budget: $401,000
- Box office: $2,494,000

Life Begins for Andy Hardy is a 1941 American comedy film and the 11th installment of the 16 popular Andy Hardy movies. Directed by George B. Seitz, Life Begins for Andy Hardy was also the last Andy Hardy movie to feature Judy Garland.

== Plot ==
Having just graduated from high school, Andy Hardy (Mickey Rooney) decides that as an adult, it's time to start living his life on his own. Judge Hardy (Lewis Stone) expects his son to attend college and study law but Andy isn't sure that's what he wants to do so he heads off to New York City to find a job. With high spirits and a new car, he drives to New York with his longtime friend Betsy Booth (Judy Garland).

Andy acquires a room in a boarding house where he meets a young man named Jimmy who had just quit his job as an office boy at a midtown firm. When Betsy rushes Andy there unannounced to apply for Jimmy's former job, she patiently circles the congested streets in Andy's car waiting for him to return. Eventually, the car runs out of gas and Andy does not land the job due to the boss's nephew acquiring it before him. Andy lives without a job for several weeks, too proud to accept financial help from the affluent Betsy until Jennitt Hicks, the office receptionist, visits Andy to inform him the job is free, the nephew having lost the job. Andy begins to date Jennitt, a worldly woman who (in addition to the office staff) is amused at his naivete and sometimes clumsiness. Andy soon learns that living in the city, weekly expenses, including gifts and dates for his new girlfriend, quickly add up. He also mourns his new friend Jimmy, who dies unexpectedly.

Andy is nearly fired after he accidentally mixes up two outgoing letters in the office mail. Although ashamed to let his father know of his financial difficulties, Judge Hardy learns of Andy's circumstances from Betsy and he travels to New York to visit Andy. After facing these several lessons of life (including the discovery that Jennitt is separated, but still married to her husband), Andy concludes that he may still have some growing up to do and he decides to return home where he gets a job at Dugan's garage, since he is knowledgeable about repairing cars.

== Cast ==
- Mickey Rooney as Andy Hardy
- Judy Garland as Betsy Booth
- Lewis Stone as Judge James K. Hardy
- Fay Holden as Mrs. Emily Hardy
- Ann Rutherford as Polly Benedict
- Sara Haden as Aunt Milly Forrest
- Patricia Dane as Jennitt Hicks
- Ray McDonald as Jimmy Frobisher

== Box office ==
According to MGM records the film earned $1,684,000 in the US and Canada and $810,000 elsewhere resulting in a profit of $1,324,000.
