= Neither Are We Enemies =

Neither Are We Enemies is a made-for-television drama that is set in Judea at the time of Jesus. It was broadcast on NBC as a Hallmark Hall of Fame Easter special on March 13, 1970.

== Plot ==
The primary characters are the Hebrew judge Joseph of Arimathea and his son Jonathan.

Both men are troubled by the Roman occupation of their land; both have listened to the words of the prophet Jesus. Joseph sees the man of Nazareth as the Messiah, sent to give the people hope without stirring up revolution. Young Jonathan, filled with the same seething resentments as his friends, hears a different message. He interprets Jesus's words as a call to arms.

== Background ==
Scriptwriter Henry Denker said: "I wanted to interpret the events surrounding the crucifixion with a parallel to the conflicts of our time."

Neither Are We Enemies was produced by Peabody Award winner Jacqueline Babbin.

== Main cast ==
Actor	Role
Van Heflin	Joseph of Arimathea
Kristoffer Tabori	Jonathan
J.D. Cannon	Pontius Pilate
Ed Begley	Annas
Kate Reid	Deborah
Leonard Frey	Judas Iscariot
