= Johnny Eager =

1942 film by Mervyn LeRoy

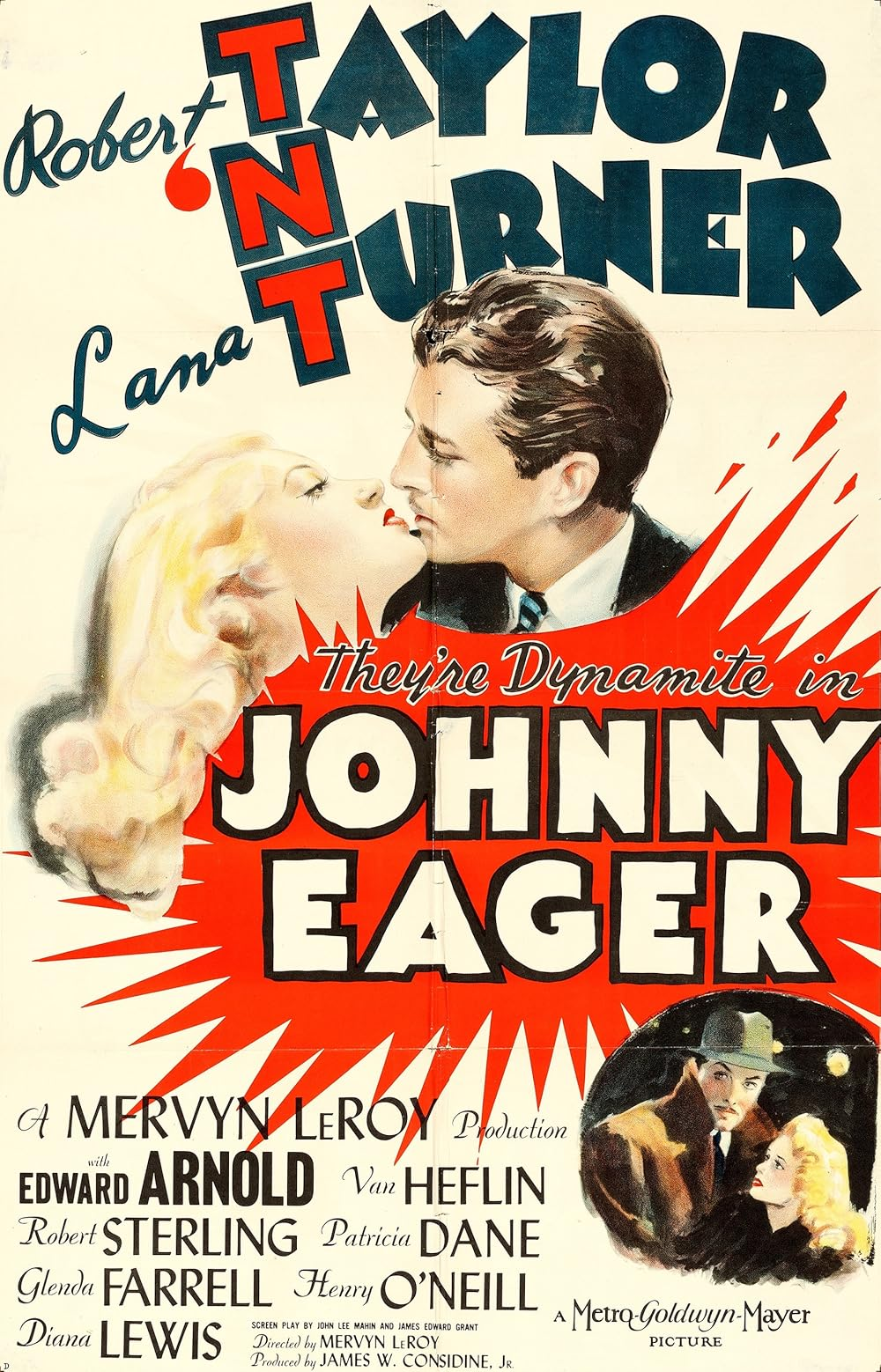
- Theatrical release poster
- Directed by: Mervyn LeRoy
- Screenplay by: John Lee Mahin; James Edward Grant
- Story by: James Edward Grant
- Produced by: John W. Considine Jr.; Mervyn LeRoy
- Starring: Robert Taylor; Lana Turner; Edward Arnold; Van Heflin
- Cinematography: Harold Rosson
- Edited by: Albert Akst
- Music by: Bronislau Kaper
- Production company: Metro-Goldwyn-Mayer
- Distributed by: Loew's Inc.
- Release date: January 14, 1942 (San Francisco)
- Running time: 107 minutes
- Country: United States
- Language: English
- Budget: $651,000
- Box office: $2,586,000

Johnny Eager is a 1942 American film noir directed by Mervyn LeRoy and starring Robert Taylor, Lana Turner, and Van Heflin. The film follows a paroled criminal who meets and falls in love with a young sociology student who is the stepdaughter of the district attorney who imprisoned him. Robert Sterling, Patricia Dane, and Glenda Farrell appear in supporting roles.

Released in January 1942, Johnny Eager was a box-office hit for Metro-Goldwyn-Mayer, grossing $2.6 million. Heflin won an Academy Award for Best Supporting Actor for his performance in the film. The film was one of many spoofed in Dead Men Don't Wear Plaid (1982).

== Plot ==
Johnny Eager masquerades as a taxi driver for his gullible parole officer, A. J. Verne, but in reality, he is the ruthless head of a powerful gambling syndicate. Verne introduces him to socialite Lisbeth "Liz" Bard, a sociology student. Johnny and Liz are attracted to each other, but then he discovers that she is the stepdaughter of his longtime nemesis, John Benson Farrell. As a crusading prosecutor, Farrell was responsible for sending Johnny to prison, and now as the district attorney, he has gotten an injunction preventing Johnny's expensive dog-racing track from opening.

Johnny decides to use Liz as leverage against her stepfather. When she comes to see him, he has Julio, one of his underlings, burst in and pretend to try to kill him. During the faked struggle, Julio drops his gun. Lisbeth picks it up and shoots Julio, when he seems to have the upper hand. Johnny then hustles her out of the room before she can realize that the gun is full of blanks, and Julio's blood is actually ketchup. Later, Johnny threatens to expose her as a murderer unless Farrell removes the injunction. Farrell gives in.

Johnny is depicted as a man without a conscience. When childhood friend Lew Rankin gets fed up with his subordinate role in the gang and starts plotting against him, Johnny murders him without the slightest qualm. He lies to his devoted girlfriend Garnet to get her to go to Florida while he romances Liz. Mae, a prior girlfriend, asks him to help get her incorruptible policeman husband transferred back to his old precinct because his long bus commute is straining their marriage. Johnny not only lies, claiming he no longer has any influence, but he also hides the fact that he got the man transferred in the first place because he would not look the other way. When Jimmy Courtney, Liz's high-society former boyfriend, becomes alarmed because Liz is going to pieces due to a guilty conscience, he offers Johnny all his money to leave the country and take Liz with him. Johnny cannot figure out his "angle"; why he would do such a selfless thing. In fact, the only soft spot Johnny seems to have is for his intellectual, alcoholic, right-hand man, Jeff Hartnett, and even he is not sure why. Jeff has an insight, telling his boss, "even Johnny Eager has to have one friend."

When Johnny learns that Liz intends to turn herself in, though,he discovers the meaning of love for the first time in his life. He confesses to her that he staged the whole incident, but she does not believe him. To prove his claim, he decides to produce a live Julio, but Julio has defected to Johnny's dissatisfied partner, Bill Halligan. Johnny manages to bring Julio (at gunpoint) to Liz, but in the process, he shoves Johnny and runs away. Johnny forces Liz and Courtney to flee to safety before the gunfight with Halligan and his men. Eager kills Halligan and Julio, but as he attempts to flee, he is spotted by a policeman disembarking from a bus and is shot down. Jeff arrives and embraces Johnny as he finally dies.

The policeman, in a twist of fate, turns out to be Mae's husband.

== Cast ==
- Robert Taylor as Johnny Eager
- Lana Turner as Lisbeth Bard
- Edward Arnold as John Benson Farrell
- Van Heflin as Jeff Hartnett
- Robert Sterling as Jimmy Courtney
- Patricia Dane as Garnet
- Glenda Farrell as Mae Blythe
- Henry O'Neill as A.J. Verne
- Diana Lewis as Judy Sanford
- Barry Nelson as Lew Rankin
- Charles Dingle as A. Frazier Marco
- Paul Stewart as Julio
- Cy Kendall as Bill Halligan
- Don Costello as Billiken
- Lou Lubin as Benjy
- Joe Downing as Ryan
- Connie Gilchrist as Peg Fowler
- Robin Raymond as Matilda "Matty" Fowler
- Leona Maricle as Miss Mines
- Emory Parnell as Policeman
- Byron Shores as Officer 711 (Mae's husband)

== Production ==
Robert Taylor and Lana Turner's casting was announced in July 1941. Principal photography was underway by September 1941, with star Turner collecting a salary of $1,500 per week while working on the film.

== Release ==
Johnny Eager was released in San Francisco on January 14, 1942.

The film was promoted with a slogan reading "TNT," referring to the explosive chemistry between "Taylor N' Turner."

=== Home media ===
The Warner Archive Collection released Johnny Eager on DVD on May 5, 2009.

== Reception ==
=== Box office ===
According to MGM records, the film earned $1,596,000 in the U.S. and Canada and $990,000 in other markets, resulting in a profit of $1,110,000.

=== Critical response ===
In The New York Times, Theodore Strauss called the film "a tight tale of underworld terror that drives hard—even in the clinches", and although not a "serious drama...as pure melodrama 'Johnny Eager' moves at a turbulent tempo...Mr. Taylor and Miss Turner strike sparks in their distraught love affair. Van Heflin provides a sardonic portrait of Johnny's Boswell, full of long words and fancy quotations." The Whittier News praised the film, naming it one of the most "engrossing productions of the year," lauding Taylor and Turner's lead performances as well as LeRoy's "outstanding direction." John Hobart of the San Francisco Chronicle similarly praised LeRoy's direction as well as the performances from Taylor, Turner, and Heflin.

Variety reported "Johnny Eager is an underworld meller with a few new twists to the usual trappings, but by and large it's the familiar tale...of slick gangster vs innocent rich girl." However, the reviewer praised all three leads, singling Van Heflin out as "outstanding".

Modern critic Emanuel Levy was less enthused, complaining that the plot "fails to make any sense." However, he complimented Van Heflin for "stealing every scene he is in".

=== Accolades ===
Award/association	Year	Category	Recipient(s) and nominee(s)	Result	Ref.
Academy Awards	1943	Best Supporting Actor	Van Heflin	Won	
Photoplay Awards	1942	Best Picture of the Month (March)	Johnny Eager	Won	
Photoplay Awards	1942	Best Performances of the Month (March)	Robert Taylor	Won	
Photoplay Awards	1942	Best Performances of the Month (March)	Van Heflin	Won	

== Sources ==
- Basinger, Jeanine (1976). Lana Turner. New York City, New York: Pyramid Publications. ISBN 978-0-515-04194-1.
- Hogan, David J. (2013). Film Noir FAQ: All That's Left to Know About Hollywood's Golden Age of Dames, Detectives, and Danger. Milwaukee, Wisconsin: Applause Books. ISBN 978-1-480-34305-4.
- Osteen, Mark (2025). "The Cells of Johnny Eager". Mervyn LeRoy Comes to Town. Rutgers, New Jersey: Rutgers University Press. pp. 91–102. ISBN 978-1-978-83837-6.
- Schwartz, Ronald (2013). Houses of Noir: Dark Visions from Thirteen Film Studios. Jefferson, North Carolina: McFarland & Company. ISBN 978-1-476-60460-2.
