= The Ruthless Four =

1968 film

- Film poster
- Directed by: Giorgio Capitani
- Screenplay by: Fernando Di Leo; Augusto Caminito
- Story by: Fernando Di Leo; Augusto Caminito
- Produced by: Luciano Ercoli; Alberto Pugliese
- Starring: Van Heflin; Gilbert Roland; Klaus Kinski; George Hilton
- Cinematography: Sergio D'Offizi
- Edited by: Renato Cinquini
- Music by: Carlo Rustichelli
- Production companies: Produzioni Cinematografiche Mediterranee - P.C.M. (Italy), Eichberg Film, München, (West Germany)
- Distributed by: I.F.C. - International Film Company
- Release date: 9 February 1968 (Italy)
- Countries: Italy; West Germany

The Ruthless Four (Italian: Ognuno per sé, lit. 'Everyone for Himself') is a 1968 Italian / West German feature motion picture about the American Frontier / Western film directed by Giorgio Capitani and starring famous American actors Van Heflin, and Gilbert Roland, along with an international cast (but generally unknown in the U.S.). It was first released in Europe, in Italy and West Germany.

== Cast ==
- Van Heflin as Sam Cooper
- Gilbert Roland as Mason
- Klaus Kinski as Brent the Blonde
- George Hilton as Manolo Sanchez
- Sarah Ross as Anna
- Federico Boido (as Rick Boyd)
- Sergio Doria
- Giovanni Ivan Scratuglia (as Ivan Scratuglia)
- Giorgio Gruden
- Hardy Reichelt
- Teodoro Corrà (as Doro Corra)

== Release ==
The Ruthless Four was released in West Germany on 6 August 1968 as Das Gold von Sam Cooper.
