= Certain Honorable Men =

Certain Honorable Men is a 1968 American TV movie starring Van Heflin and Peter Fonda. It was written by Rod Serling.

It was part of a series of specials called On Stage sponsored by Prudential.

== Cast ==
- Van Heflin
- Peter Fonda
- Alexandra Isles

== Production ==
It was inspired by the Thomas J. Dodd case.

Fonda had to cut his hair to play his role. "I felt like a fag in drag trying to play Angela Lansbury", he said.

It was filmed at NBC's studios in Brooklyn.

== Reception ==
The New York Times said it was "fair more interesting than the average TV drama".
