= Honky Tonk (1941 film) =

1941 film by Jack Conway

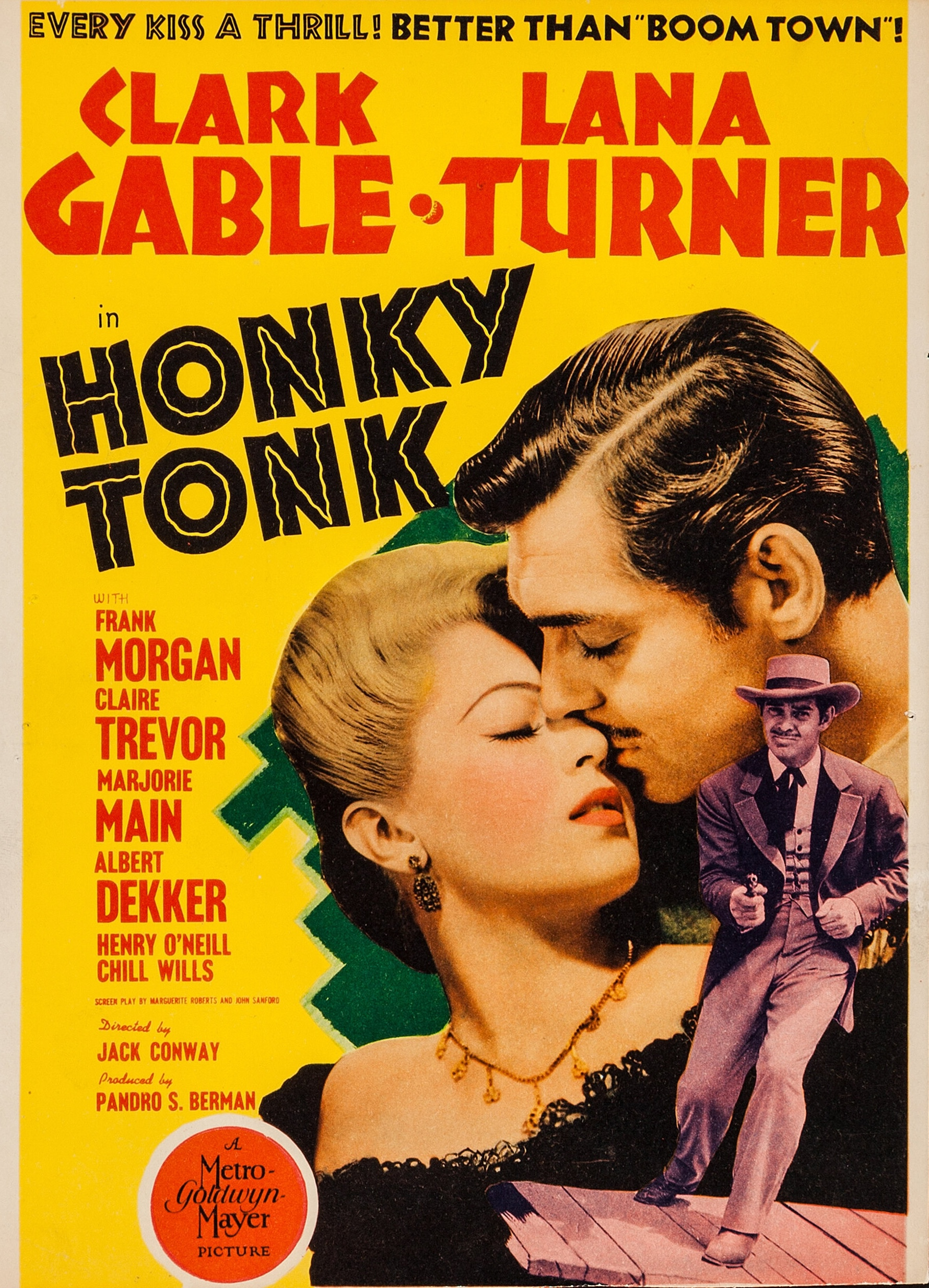
- Theatrical release poster
- Directed by: Jack Conway
- Written by: Marguerite Roberts; John Sanford; Annalee Whitmore Fadiman (Note: Uncredited.)
- Produced by: Pandro S. Berman
- Starring: Clark Gable; Lana Turner; Claire Trevor; Frank Morgan
- Cinematography: Harold Rosson; William H. Daniels
- Edited by: Blanche Sewell
- Music by: Franz Waxman
- Production company: Metro-Goldwyn-Mayer
- Distributed by: Loew's Inc.
- Release date: October 2, 1941
- Running time: 105 minutes
- Country: United States
- Language: English
- Budget: $899,000
- Box office: $3.98 million

Honky Tonk is a 1941 American historical western comedy drama film directed by Jack Conway and starring Clark Gable and Lana Turner. The supporting cast features Claire Trevor, Frank Morgan, Marjorie Main, Albert Dekker and Chill Wills. The film follows a corrupt con man and grifter who rises to power over a small Nevada gold rush town. Produced by Pandro S. Berman, the film was made and distributed by Metro-Goldwyn-Mayer.

== Plot ==
Con man "Candy" Johnson and his friend "Sniper" flee town using quick wits and magic tricks. They catch a train to Yellow Creek, Nevada, where a gold rush is in progress. Aboard, he meets Elizabeth Cotton; she takes an instant dislike to him. When they arrive, Candy is amused to discover she is the daughter of "Judge" Cotton, an old acquaintance of his. Elizabeth is unaware of her father's crooked past and present.

Later that night, Candy, Sniper and the judge go to the local saloon. There, Candy finds another old friend of his, "Gold Dust" Nelson. She points out to him the owner (and sheriff), Brazos Hearn. When a gambler claims that the saloon is crooked, Candy takes his side. He forces Brazos into a game of Russian Roulette with him. The sheriff gives up after the fourth round and gives Candy $5,000 to end the contest. Candy later reveals to Sniper and the judge that he had palmed the bullet; the gun was unloaded.

When Candy brings the judge home, Elizabeth berates him for getting her father drunk and being a bad influence. Candy overhears a hotel guest, Mrs. Varner, the widow of a preacher, say there is no church in the town. Candy gives her $1,500 to build one. Before leaving, Candy manages to kiss Elizabeth three times before being slapped. Mrs. Varner asks her why she did not stop him at the second. Candy opens a rival saloon and gambling den, which becomes more popular than Brazos'. Gold Dust becomes jealous of Elizabeth and tells her not to expect a wedding ring. Undiscouraged, Elizabeth gets Candy to marry her by first getting him drunk.

When Candy tells his new father-in-law, Cotton confesses to Elizabeth that he and Candy are both cheap crooks, and there is no hope of reforming either one. Elizabeth refuses to give up hope. That night, she locks Candy out of her bedroom in order for them to have a "proper courtship", infuriating him. He breaks down the door only to tell her "goodnight" and then storms off to have a "private" dinner with Gold Dust. Elizabeth shows up and makes up with Candy.

The next morning, she persuades him to leave his guns at home. Brazos, seeing he is unarmed, sends one of his men to shoot him. Candy turns out to have a concealed weapon, and kills the man. Brazos tries to call it murder, but the townspeople disagree. When Candy learns that Brazos had appointed himself sheriff, he gets himself elected as his replacement. He soon controls the town and amasses a huge fortune through various underhanded means. Even Brazos joins him.

When Elizabeth announces that she is pregnant, Candy is overjoyed. Upon hearing the news, the judge asks Elizabeth how Candy acquired the wealth to build her a mansion. When she replies that she doesn't care about Candy's method, only the results, Cotton tells her that she did not change Candy, he changed her.

Candy's men pressure him to dispose of the judge, who is telling the townsfolk all he knows about Candy's setup. To save Cotton's life, Candy puts him on a train out of town, but the judge returns and is shot in the back by Brazos during a town meeting. When she hears of her father's death, Elizabeth falls from her carriage, losing the baby and nearly her own life. Following her life-saving operation, a distraught Candy decides to leave Elizabeth, as he is no good for her.

Before he can, Candy learns of an armed confrontation between the townspeople and his men barricaded in city hall. Candy goes inside. He shoots it out with Brazos, who has taken over, and kills him. Then he lies to the crooks, telling them the governor has dispatched the militia to attack them (when in actuality, the corrupt governor offered Candy the militia to put down the rebellious townspeople).

The crooks all flee. Candy and Sniper brazen their way out of town and end up at a hotel in Cheyenne. Sniper sends Elizabeth a postcard telling her where they are. She follows and is reunited with her husband.

== Cast ==
- Clark Gable as "Candy" Johnson
- Lana Turner as Elizabeth Cotton
- Frank Morgan as Judge Cotton
- Claire Trevor as "Gold Dust" Nelson
- Marjorie Main as Mrs. Varner
- Albert Dekker as Brazos Hearn
- Henry O'Neill as Daniel Wells
- Chill Wills as The Sniper
- Veda Ann Borg as Pearl
- Douglas Wood as Governor Wilson
- Betty Blythe as Mrs. Wilson
- Harry J. Worth as Harry Gates
- Lew Harvey as Blackie

== Production ==
=== Casting ===
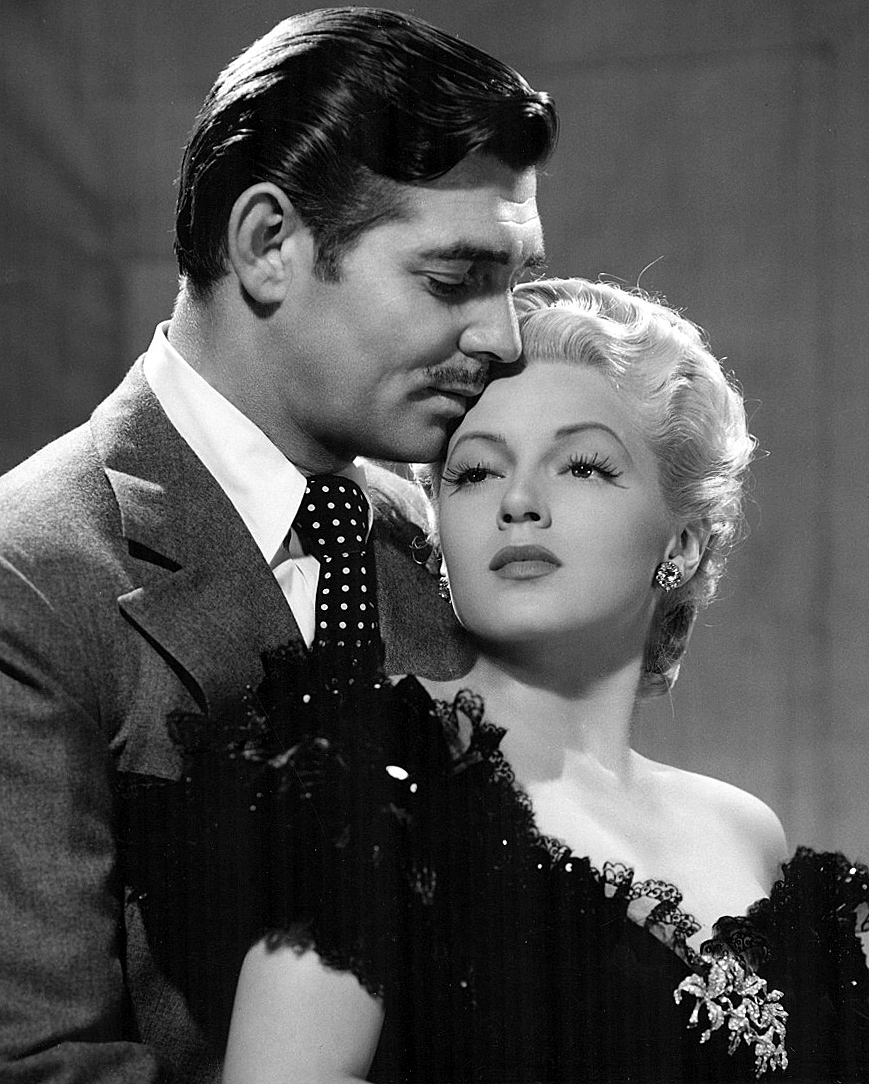
Gable and Turner in a publicity still for the film

Honky Tonk marked the first of four pairings of Clark Gable and Lana Turner. Gable and Turner were paired again in Somewhere I'll Find You (1942). They made two other films together, Homecoming (1948) and Betrayed (1954).

When cast, Lana Turner was only twenty years old, but experiencing a career high, having just starred in the successful films Dr. Jekyll and Mr. Hyde and Ziegfeld Girl. MGM was looking to make Turner its replacement for the deceased platinum beauty Jean Harlow and therefore cast her alongside the "King of Hollywood" himself, Clark Gable.

Turner was thrilled at the opportunity of working with Gable, but he was not. She was twenty years his junior and quite green to the world of Hollywood. When reading lines with her idol, Turner was flustered, and blundered quite often. Gable said, "She couldn't read lines. She didn't make them mean anything; it was obvious she was an amateur."

Nevertheless, the pairing proved successful, and their steamy scenes together were unnerving to almost everyone, including Gable's wife Carole Lombard. She knew that he had an affinity for blondes, and upon hearing of Turner's casting, went to production head Louis B. Mayer and told him to specifically tell Turner that Gable was entirely off-limits.

=== Filming ===
Lombard had a habit of making surprise visits to the sets and was noticeably present during the bedroom scene with Turner and Gable. Turner was so intimidated by Lombard's presence that she went into her dressing room and refused to come out. When she did, Lombard was nowhere to be found. While Turner always vehemently denied rumors that she and Gable were involved in an affair, only going as far as to say she was quite smitten with him but looked up to him as more of a father-figure than anything else, it has always been speculated that a Turner-and-Gable affair had something to do with Lombard's last-minute decision to take a plane back to Los Angeles rather than a train, resulting in the crash which took her life. Turner claimed that the only time she and Gable ever saw each other outside of a professional environment was in the months following Lombard's death. Louis B. Mayer ordered her to have dinner with Gable at his home that he had shared with Lombard. Turner found him a lonely, broken man, a ghost of his former self.

== Release ==
Honky Tonk premiered in New York City and San Francisco on October 2, 1941.

=== Home media ===
A DVD of the film was released by the Warner Archive Collection in June 2009.

The film was released on Blu-ray by the Warner Archive Collection on March 31, 2026. The special features of the release include the original theatrical trailer and a 1946 audio-only Lux Radio Theater broadcast starring Turner and John Hodiak, as well as the classic Tom and Jerry cartoon The Midnight Snack and the Our Gang comedy short Fightin' Fools.

== Reception ==
=== Box office ===
Honky Tonk was MGM's most financially successful film of 1941, and was the second highest-grossing film of that year, second only to Warner Bros.' Sergeant York. According to MGM records the film earned $2,893,000 in the US and Canada, and $1,087,000 elsewhere resulting in a profit of $1,895,000.

=== Critical response ===
Contemporary reviews appraised the film as about average to good. Theodore Strauss of The New York Times described the film as mostly "a crowd-catching midway exhibit in which Miss Turner gives a competent, if limited, performance and Mr. Gable again shows off his muscles." Variety, however, called the performances "uniformly good" and noted that the screenplay "though padded a bit and still open to cutting, is excellent for this action picture purpose". Film Daily wrote, "Both Gable and Miss Turner give ace accounts of themselves in the leads, and there are some slick bits by their fellow players ... Jack Conway's two-fisted direction makes for solidity and realism, and Harold Rosson's photography is expert." Harrison's Reports wrote, "As the rough romantic lover, Clark Gable seems to have done it again, for he is all that and more." John Mosher of The New Yorker called the film "Just a plain Western."

== Remake ==
A television film remake was produced in 1974, starring Richard Crenna and Margot Kidder in the lead roles.

== Sources ==
- Welky, David (2008). The Moguls and the Dictators: Hollywood and the Coming of World War II. Baltimore, Maryland: Johns Hopkins University Press. ISBN 978-0-801-89044-4.
