= Somewhere I'll Find You =

1942 film by Wesley Ruggles

- Directed by: Wesley Ruggles
- Screenplay by: Marguerite Roberts; Walter Reisch (adaptation)
- Based on: Somewhere I'll Find You; 1940 story in Cosmopolitan by Charles Hoffman
- Produced by: Pandro S. Berman
- Starring: Clark Gable; Lana Turner
- Cinematography: Harold Rosson
- Edited by: Frank E. Hull
- Music by: Bronislau Kaper
- Distributed by: Metro-Goldwyn-Mayer
- Release dates: August 27, 1942 (New York City); October 1, 1942 (Los Angeles)
- Running time: 108 minutes
- Country: United States
- Language: English
- Budget: $1 million
- Box office: $4 million

Somewhere I'll Find You is a 1942 American war drama film directed by Wesley Ruggles and starring Clark Gable and Lana Turner, released by Metro-Goldwyn Mayer. The film took almost two years to complete and was the last film Gable starred in before he enlisted in the United States Army Air Forces for World War II. His next film was the post-war Adventure (1945).

== Plot ==
In October 1941, war correspondents and brothers "Jonny" and Kirk Davis return to the still-neutral United States after being kicked out of Germany. Jonny's boss, isolationist New York Daily Chronicle publisher George L. Stafford, refuses to print his story about Japan and Germany's plans for the world, but Jonny tricks him into doing so, and gets fired for his trouble.

When Jonny goes to reclaim his old room from friends and landlords "Evie" and Willie Manning, he is annoyed (despite having been away for years) to find they have rented it out to Paula Lane, an aspiring reporter who wants to work as a foreign correspondent. Ladies man Jonny is very interested in the beautiful blonde, but then finds that his brother already has a relationship with her. A romantic triangle ensues. Despite being in love with her himself, Jonny tries to arrange it so that Paula chooses Kirk.

Eventually, they are all reunited in Manila ... on Sunday, December 7, the day of the attack on Pearl Harbor, which brings America into the war. Jonny insists that the other two leave on a ship for Australia, while he remains behind to report for the Chronicle, but they sneak back on the pilot boat after he sees them off. Kirk enlists, while Paula joins the Red Cross.

When the Japanese invade the Philippines, Jonny encounters his brother by chance; Kirk is part of a detachment under the command of Lieutenant Wade Hall that is assigned to repel a Japanese amphibious landing. Kirk and most of the other defenders die in the fierce fighting. Jonny believes that Paula was also killed, when the hospital where she was working was wiped out, but it turns out she was out escorting a party of wounded there. When they find each other, Jonny sets her at a typewriter and starts dictating the rest of his newspaper story.

== Cast ==
- Clark Gable as Jonathan "Jonny" Davis
- Lana Turner as Paula Lane
- Robert Sterling as Kirk "Junior" Davis
- Patricia Dane as Crystal McRegan
- Reginald Owen as Willie Manning
- Lee Patrick as Eve "Evie" Manning
- Charles Dingle as George L. Stafford
- Sara Haden as Miss Coultier
- Van Johnson as Lieutenant Wade Hall (uncredited)
- Keenan Wynn as Sergeant Tom Purdy, a machine gunner under Hall's command (uncredited)

Cast notes

- Somewhere I'll Find You was the film debut of longtime Hollywood character actor Keenan Wynn.

== Production ==
The film was designed as another vehicle for the immensely popular Gable/Turner pairing. Following their success in 1941's Honky Tonk, MGM was looking to capitalize on this new team, hoping to reproduce the box office appeal Gable had when he was paired with actresses Joan Crawford (8 films), Jean Harlow (6 films), and Myrna Loy (7 films) in the 1930s. Once filming began, Gable and Turner continued their friendly working relationship.

Filming was suspended for a month after Gable's wife, actress Carole Lombard, was killed in a plane crash. Gable was permitted to take leave from filming for a period of bereavement, and the studio almost scrapped the film. It was retitled Red Light but changed back to Somewhere I'll Find You before its release. It was the last film made by Gable prior to his military service during World War II; he did not make another film until 1945.

The film was, like the Gable/Turner pairing in Honky Tonk (1941), a box office success. The pair later made two more films together, Homecoming (1948) and Betrayed (1954). Both those movies, like "Somewhere I'll Find You," had Gable and Turner serving as comrades and lovers in World War II.

== Reception ==
According to MGM records the film earned $2,885,000 in the US and Canada and $1,129,000 elsewhere, making the studio a profit of $1,749,000.
