= Alexandra Isles =

American documentary filmmaker and former actress

- Alexandra Isles as the original Victoria Winters from the Dark Shadows TV series
- Born: Alexandra Cornelia von Moltke; February 11, 1945 (age 81); Uppsala, Sweden
- Other name: Alexandra Moltke
- Occupations: Actress; documentary filmmaker
- Spouses: Philip Henry Isles (m. 1967; div. 1976) Alfred Jaretzki III (m. 1991; died 2014)
- Children: 1
- Parent(s): Mab Wilson Moltke; Carl Moltke
- Website: alexandraisles.com

Alexandra Isles (née Alexandra Cornelia von Moltke; born February 11, 1945) is a documentary filmmaker and former actress. She is best known for her role as the original Victoria Winters from 1966 to 1968 on the gothic TV serial Dark Shadows.

== Early life ==
Alexandra Cornelia von Moltke was born in Uppsala, Sweden on February 11, 1945, of Danish and American parentage, the elder of two daughters, to Count Carl Adam Moltke, son of Count Carl Moltke, and Countess Mab Moltke (née Wilson; formerly Wright). Count Moltke was a permanent member of the Danish Mission to the United Nations, and Countess Moltke was an editor at Vogue.

Through her American grandmother, Cornelia Van Rensselaer Thayer, Isles and her younger sister, Victoria, are descended from the Livingston, Schuyler, Bayard and Van Rensselaer families.

== Career ==
In 1985, Isles began work at the Museum of Television & Radio where she became a curator specializing in arts, drama and children's programming. In 1991, a grant from the National Endowment for the Humanities launched her on a career as a producer and director of the award-winning documentaries The Power of Conscience: The Danish Resistance and Rescue of the Jews (1995); Scandalize My Name: Stories from the Blacklist (1999); Porraimos: Europe's Gypsies in the Holocaust (2002); The Healing Gardens of New York (2006); and Hidden Treasures: Stories from a Great Museum (2011). Her films have been seen at the United States Holocaust Memorial Museum (Washington, D.C.), Museum of Modern Art (New York), and numerous film festivals including the Human Rights Watch and Margaret Mead Film Festivals, and all have aired on PBS. Currently, Isles works at the Metropolitan Museum of Art as a Volunteer Educator.

== Personal life ==
In 1967, Isles married Philip Henry Isles II of the Lehman banking family at the Madison Avenue Presbyterian Church in Manhattan. She left Dark Shadows in 1968 due to pregnancy. In 1969, she gave birth to a son.

Isles was the mistress of Claus von Bülow and testified at his 1982 and 1985 trials for the attempted murder of his wife, Sunny. She was portrayed by Julie Hagerty in the 1990 film Reversal of Fortune that dramatized these events.

In 1985, Isles began work at the Museum of Television & Radio (now the Paley Center for Media), and became an Assistant Curator, working on exhibitions and screening series on the arts and children's programming. In 1991, with a grant from the National Endowment for the Humanities, she produced and directed Scandalize My Name, Stories from the Blacklist, introduced by Morgan Freeman and featuring Harry Belafonte and Ossie Davis. That same year, she married a physician, Dr. Alfred Jaretzki III.

Isles' subsequent documentary films were The Power of Conscience: The Danish Resistance and Rescue of the Jews; Porraimos: Europe's Gypsies in the Holocaust; The Healing Gardens of New York; Hidden Treasures: Stories from a Great Museum; and Harry's Gift: A New York Story.

== Filmography ==
=== Television ===
Year	Title	Role	Notes
1966–1968	Dark Shadows	Victoria Winters	Main role; Gothic soap opera
1968	Certain Honorable Men	Betty Jo Daly	Television Film
1976	The Adams Chronicles	Elizabeth Smith	Television Mini-series

=== Documentary Films (Director/Producer) ===
Year	Title	Role	Notes
1995	The Power of Conscience: The Danish Resistance and Rescue of the Jews	Director/Producer	Documentary about Denmark's rescue of Jews during WWII
1999	Scandalize My Name: Stories from the Blacklist	Director/Producer	Narrated by Morgan Freeman; explores McCarthy-era blacklisting of Black performers
2002	Porraimos: Europe's Gypsies in the Holocaust	Director/Producer	Documentary on the persecution of Roma people during WWII
2006	The Healing Gardens of New York	Director/Producer	Examines therapeutic gardens in urban NYC
2011	Hidden Treasures: Stories from a Great Museum	Director/Producer	Focuses on the Metropolitan Museum of Art's collections
2016	Harry’s Gift: A New York Story	Director/Producer	Short documentary; screened at ReelHeART International Film Festival

== Awards and nominations ==
Year	Award	Category	Nominated work	Result
2016	ReelHeART International Film Festival	Short Documentary	Harry's Gift	Nominated
