= Northwest Rangers =

1942 film by Joseph M. Newman

- Film poster
- Directed by: Joseph M. Newman
- Written by: Gordon Kahn; David Lang
- Based on: story by Arthur Caesar
- Produced by: Samuel Marx
- Starring: James Craig; William Lundigan; John Carradine
- Cinematography: Jackson Rose
- Edited by: Frank E. Hull
- Music by: Daniele Amfitheatrof; David Snell
- Distributed by: Metro-Goldwyn-Mayer
- Release date: 1942
- Running time: 65 minutes
- Country: United States
- Language: English
- Budget: $311,000
- Box office: $459,000

Northwest Rangers is a 1942 American Metro-Goldwyn-Mayer northern film that is a remake of Manhattan Melodrama set in the North-West Mounted Police of Canada. It was also known as Gambler's Choice.

== Plot ==
A mountie tracks down a former childhood friend.

== Cast ==
- James Craig as Frank 'Blackie' Marshall
- William Lundigan as James Kevin Gardiner
- Patricia Dane as Jean Avery
- John Carradine as Martin Caswell
- Jack Holt as Duncan Frazier
- Keenan Wynn as "Slip" O'Mara
- Grant Withers as Fowler
- Darryl Hickman as 'Blackie' – as a Boy
- Drew Roddy as Jim – as a Boy

== Production ==
The film was a remake of Manhattan Melodrama and was originally called Gambler's Choice. It was the feature directorial debut for Joe Newman, who had made a number of short films for MGM as well as having worked as an assistant director at the studio for many years. The leads were to be Patricia Dane, William Lundigan and John Carroll. The lead role was given to James Craig.

Filming started in June 1942.

== Reception ==
The film earned $313,000 in the US and Canada and $146,000 elsewhere, making a loss of $12,000.

The Chicago Daily Tribune praised the "likeable performers".
