= Du Barry Did All Right =

Du Barry Did Alright
- Directed by: Joseph Henabery
- Written by: Willie Weil (story); Leo 'Ukie' Sharon
- Starring: Irene Bordoni
- Cinematography: Ray Foster
- Edited by: Bert Frank
- Music by: Mann Curtis; Cliff Hess; David Mendoza
- Distributed by: Warner Brothers
- Release date: August 7, 1937
- Running time: 22 minutes
- Country: United States
- Language: English

Du Barry Did Alright (1937) is a Black and White Warner Brothers Vitaphone musical short starring Irène Bordoni.

== Plot ==
A woman living in Paris (Bordoni) feels neglected by her husband (Dingle), so she leaves for New York.

== Cast ==
- Irène Bordoni as Irene Wainwright
- Charles Dingle as John Wainwright
- Regina Wallace as Edna
- Eddie Noll as himself
- Marion Nolan as herself
- Joey Ray as Orchestra leader
- Charles Carrer as himself
- Harland Dixan as Dancer
- Percy Helton as Hotel Desk Clerk (uncredited)

== Songs ==
- Forty Second Street (studio orchestra)
- Darktown Strutters' Ball (dance number)
- When the Cat's Away Performed by Joey Ray
- Du Barry Didn't Do So Bad Performed by Irene Bordoni

== See also ==
- Broadway's Like That (1930) short film
- Paree, Paree (1934) short film
- Sound-on-disc
