= Joan Chandler =

American actor

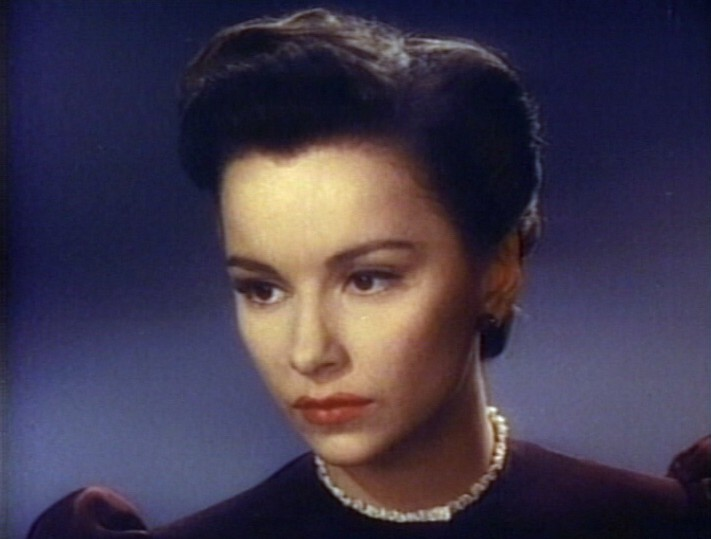
- from the trailer for the film Rope (1948)
- Born: Joan Imel Cheeseman; August 24, 1923; Butler, Pennsylvania, U.S.
- Died: May 11, 1979 (aged 55); New York City, U.S.
- Education: Bennington College
- Occupations: Film, stage, television actress
- Years active: 1944–1960
- Spouses: David McKay; Dr. Charles C. Hogan

Joan Chandler (born Joan Imel Cheeseman; August 24, 1923 – May 11, 1979) was an American actress who notably starred in Rope (1948) with James Stewart and Humoresque (1946) with Joan Crawford.

The second of three daughters to William Carl and Imel Geraldine Cheeseman (née Beach)^, Chandler was born in Butler, Pennsylvania. She took piano lessons from her musician mother and began studying ballet when she was 5. She attended Butler High School and the School of Arts at Bennington College. She also studied at the Neighborhood Playhouse School of the Theatre in New York. Before she became a professional actress, she toured with a ballet company.

A founding member of The Actors Studio, Chandler appeared in three feature films, five Broadway plays, and about 12 television programs, such as Studio One and Starlight Theatre. She was married twice: first to David McKay, with whom she had one daughter; then to Dr. Charles C. Hogan. Both marriages ended in divorce.

Chandler died at age 55 of cancer in New York City.

== Filmography ==
- Humoresque (1946) - Gina Romney
- Rope (1948) - Janet Walker
- Dragstrip Riot (1958) - Lisa

== Television ==
- The Philco Television Playhouse (1 episode, 1949)

- "The House of the Seven Gables" (1949) TV episode

- Actors Studio (1 episode, 1950)

- Sanctuary in Paris (1950) TV episode

- Starlight Theatre (1 episode, 1950)

- The Roman Kid (1950) TV episode

- Pulitzer Prize Playhouse (1 episode, 1951) - Hester

- The Silver Cord (1951) TV episode

- Somerset Maugham TV Theatre (1 episode, 1951)

- The Romantic Young Lady (1951) TV episode

- Armstrong Circle Theatre (1 episode, 1951)

- A Different World (1951) TV episode

- Celanese Theatre (1 episode, 1951) - Miriamne

- "Winterset" (1951) TV episode

- Suspense (1 episode, 1951)

- Mikki (1951) TV episode

- Robert Montgomery Presents (1 episode, 1952)

- The Closed Door (1952) TV episode

- Four Star Playhouse (1 episode, 1954)

- Detective's Holiday (1954) TV episode

- Westinghouse Studio One (2 episodes, 1950–1956)

- Song for a Summer Night (1956) TV episode
- Spectre of Alexander Wolff (1950) TV episode

== Plays ==
- The Disenchanted (Breit-Schulberg)

Performer: Joan Chandler (Jere Halliday) - Replacement - Coronet Theatre - December 3, 1958 to May 16, 1959

- The Tempest (William Shakespeare)

Starring: Joan Chandler (Miranda) - American Shakespeare Festival - August 1, 1955 to September 3, 1955

- My Three Angels (Samuel and Bella Spewack)

Starring: Joan Chandler (Marie Louise Ducotel) - Morosco Theatre - March 11, 1953 to January 2, 1954

- The Lady From the Sea (Ibsen)

Performer: Joan Chandler (Boletta) - Fulton Theatre - August 7, 1950 to August 19, 1950

- Where's Charley? (Loesser-Abbott)

Starring: Joan Chandler (Amy Spettigue) - Replacement - musical based on Charley's Aunt - St. James Theatre - October 11, 1948 to September 9, 1950

- The Late George Apley

Performer: Joan Chandler (Eleanor Apley) - based on the novel by J. P. Marquand - opened on Broadway at the Lyceum Theatre on November 23, 1944, and ran for 384 performances
