= Alfred Jaretzki Jr. =

American lawyer

Alfred Jaretzki Jr. (1892–1976) was an American lawyer and an expert on investment companies. Jaretzki helped draft the Investment Company Act of 1940 passed by the United States Congress. He later authored an article in a 1941 issue of Washington University Law Quarterly that details the elements of the law and reasons for its passage. The Investment Act of 1940 created requirements for all U.S. investment companies to register with the Securities and Exchange Commission (SEC) and strengthened their government oversight.

== Early life and education ==
Jaretzki was born in New York City to Alfred Jaretzki, a leading corporate lawyer, and Tillie Shire Jaretzki on November 17, 1892. Alfred Jaretzki, Sr. worked as a partner at Sullivan & Cromwell, an international corporate law firm founded by Algernon Sydney Sullivan and William Nelson Cromwell. Jaretzki, Sr. took over the role of managing partner of Sullivan & Cromwell from Cromwell in 1900.

After graduating from Morristown School (now Morristown–Beard School) in Morristown, New Jersey, Jaretzki completed his bachelor's degree at Harvard University in Cambridge, Massachusetts, in 1913. He then earned a law degree at Harvard Law School in 1916. Jaretzki earned admittance to the Bar association that year. While at Harvard, Jaretzki served as a member of the Editorial Board of the Harvard Law Review. He also played on the lacrosse team and participated on the debate team.

In 1916, Jaretzki joined Sullivan & Cromwell as a partner. He later rose to the position of senior partner at the firm. Jaretzki served at Sullivan & Cromwell during the same period as John Foster Dulles.

== Service during World Wars I and II ==
During World War I, Jaretzki served on the War Trade Board. He later acted as an adviser to the U.S. Delegation at the Évian Conference for Jewish refugees fleeing Nazi persecution. Following the conference, Jaretzki made four trips to Vienna to assist Jewish refugees and others emigrating from Germany on behalf of the American Jewish Joint Distribution Committee (AJJDC). He served as vice chairman of AJJDC and chaired their Committee on Refugee Aid in Central and South America. During World War II, Jaretzki served as special consultant to United States Secretary of War Henry L. Stimson.

== Board service ==
Overseeing election regulations and procedures in New York City, Jaretzki chaired the New York City Board of Elections. He received appointment to that post from the New York City Council. Jaretzki served as a member of the Council on Foreign Relations and as an honorary trustee of the Public Education Association of New York City. He also served as president of St. John's Guild, an agency that assisted ill children and older adults, from 1958 to 1961.

== Family ==
Jaretzki married Edna Astruck on June 22, 1916. They had four children together: Josephine (Josie), Alfred III, Paul, and Katharine (Dotsy). After Jaretzki and Astuck divorced, he married Priscilla Bruce from London.
