= Van Heflin =

American actor (1908–1971)

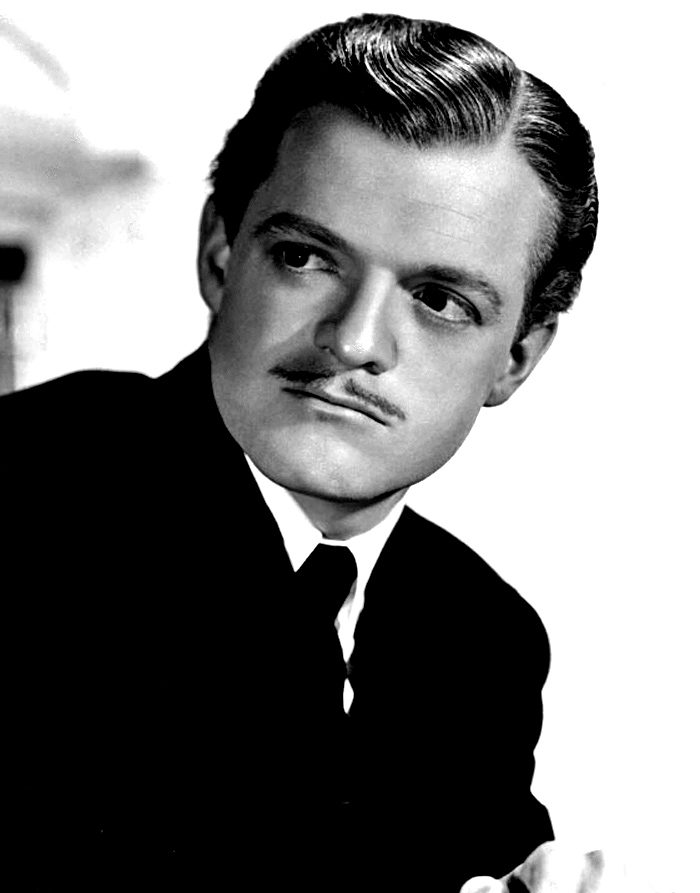
- Heflin in 1941
- Born: Emmett Evan Heflin Jr. December 13, 1908; Walters, Oklahoma, U.S.
- Died: July 23, 1971 (aged 62); Hollywood, California, U.S.
- Education: University of Oklahoma; Yale University
- Occupation: Actor
- Years active: 1928–1971
- Spouses: Eleanor Scherr (a.k.a. Eleanor Shaw) (1913–2004) (m. 1934; div. 1936) Frances E. Neal (1920–1988) (m. 1942; div. 1967)
- Children: 3

Emmett Evan "Van" Heflin Jr. (December 13, 1908 – July 23, 1971) was an American theatre, radio, and film actor. He played mostly character parts over the course of his film career, but during the 1940s had a string of roles as a leading man. Heflin won the Academy Award for Best Supporting Actor for his performance in Johnny Eager (1942). He also had starring roles in the westerns Shane (1953), 3:10 to Yuma (1957), and Gunman's Walk (1958). He portrayed a mentally disturbed airline passenger in the classic disaster film Airport (1970).

== Early life ==
Heflin was born in Walters, Oklahoma, the son of Fanny Bleecker (née Shippey) and Dr. Emmett Evan Heflin, a dentist. He was of Irish and French ancestry. Heflin's sister was Daytime Emmy-nominated actress Frances Heflin (who married composer Sol Kaplan). Heflin attended Classen High School in Oklahoma City. One source says Long Beach Polytechnic High School. He also went to the University of Oklahoma, where he earned a bachelor's degree in 1932, and was a member of Phi Delta Theta fraternity. He earned a master's degree in theater at Yale University.

Prior to his acting career, Heflin was an accomplished seaman.

== Career ==
=== Broadway ===
Heflin began his acting career on Broadway in the late 1920s. He appeared in Mr. Moneypenny (1928), The Bride of Torozko (1934), The Night Remembers (1934), Mid-West (1936), and End of Summer (1936). After this, Katharine Hepburn helped him secure a film contract with RKO Radio Pictures and he did a screen test in New York.

=== RKO ===
Heflin made his film debut in A Woman Rebels (1936), opposite Katharine Hepburn, whom he played opposite in the stage version of The Philadelphia Story. He followed it with The Outcasts of Poker Flat (1937), billed third after Preston Foster and Jean Muir, and Flight from Glory (1937), a Chester Morris programmer where Heflin played an alcoholic pilot.

Heflin was in Annapolis Salute (1937), then was given his first lead role in Saturday's Heroes (1937), playing a star quarterback.

Heflin returned to Broadway for Western Waters (1937–38) and Casey Jones (1938), the latter for the Group Theatre and directed by Elia Kazan.

In Hollywood Heflin had a support role in Back Door to Heaven (1939). He returned to Broadway where he played Macaulay Connor opposite Katharine Hepburn, Joseph Cotten and Shirley Booth in The Philadelphia Story, which ran for 417 performances from 1939 to 1940. It led to Heflin being offered a choice character part in the Errol Flynn western Santa Fe Trail (1940) at Warners, playing a villainous gun seller. The movie was a big hit.

=== MGM ===
Not being "swamped with offers" after Santa Fe Trail, Heflin contacted Billy Grady, an MGM talent scout, and arranged for a screen test, which Heflin did opposite Donna Reed. He received a stock deal from MGM, which initially cast Heflin in supporting roles in films such as The Feminine Touch (1941) and H.M. Pulham, Esq. (1941).

He had a part as Robert Taylor's doomed best friend in Johnny Eager, released early in 1942. It was a box office success and in March of 1943 won Heflin the 1942 Academy Award for Best Supporting Actor.

Following his strong performance in Johnny Eager, MGM began to groom Heflin as a leading man in B movies, giving him the star role in Kid Glove Killer (1942), directed by Fred Zinnemann, and Grand Central Murder (1942). Both were popular.

==== Stardom ====
Encouraged, MGM cast Heflin as Kathryn Grayson's love interest in a musical, Seven Sweethearts (1942), then was given the star role in an "A" film, as the embattled President Andrew Johnson in Tennessee Johnson (1942) opposite Lionel Barrymore. The film was a box office flop.

Heflin was Judy Garland's love interest in Presenting Lily Mars (1943); then, he enlisted in the Army.

Heflin served initially in the field artillery. After recuperating from injuries incurred during training, he was transferred to the Ninth Air Force as combat photographer, flying over France and Germany, before joining, with many other actors, the First Motion Picture Unit. He first appeared in the training film Land and Live in the Jungle (1944) and then in three more films.

When Heflin returned to Hollywood, MGM lent him to Hal Wallis to star opposite Barbara Stanwyck in The Strange Love of Martha Ivers (1946). He was in the all-star musical Till the Clouds Roll By (1946) then was loaned to Warner Bros to co star with Joan Crawford in Possessed (1947).

Back at MGM he co-starred with Lana Turner in Green Dolphin Street (1947), a big prestige film for the studio and their biggest hit of 1947. He was reunited with Stanwyck in B.F.'s Daughter (1948) and was loaned to Walter Wanger for Tap Roots (1948), where he was top billed; both lost money.

MGM cast him as Athos in The Three Musketeers (1948), a huge success. He was top-billed in Zinnemann's Act of Violence (1949), and supported Jennifer Jones in Madame Bovary (1949). Both movies were acclaimed but lost money. He then made a third film with Stanwyck, East Side, West Side (1950), billed beneath James Mason. The picture only netted a small profit for the studio.

=== Radio ===
The Adventures of Philip Marlowe was a radio detective drama that aired from June 17, 1947, through September 15, 1951, first heard on NBC in the summer of 1947 starring Van Heflin (June 12, 1947 – September 9, 1947). He also acted on the Lux Radio Theatre, Suspense, Cavalcade of America and many more radio programs.

=== Leaving MGM ===
Heflin began appearing on television on episodes of Nash Airflyte Theatre and Robert Montgomery Presents (an adaptation of Arrowsmith).

Heflin had the lead role in a Western at Universal, Tomahawk (1951) and starred in a thriller directed by Joseph Losey, The Prowler (1951).

At Universal he made a family comedy with Patricia Neal, Week-End with Father (1951), then he was an FBI man in Leo McCarey's anti-Communist My Son John (1952).

Heflin went to England to star in South of Algiers (1953). He appeared in a huge success as the honest farmer in Shane (1953) with Alan Ladd.

However he followed it up with action films at Universal: Wings of the Hawk (1953), and Tanganyika (1954). He starred in an independent Western, The Raid (1954) and was one of many stars in 20th Century Fox's Woman's World (1954).

Heflin stayed at Fox to star in Black Widow (1954) and he was top billed in Warners' Battle Cry (1955) based on Leon Uris's best seller which was a major hit at the box office.

After a Western, Count Three and Pray (1955), Heflin starred in Patterns (1956) based on a TV play by Rod Serling. He also did a Playhouse 90 written by Serling, "The Dark Side of the Earth", and "The Rank and File"; he also did "The Cruel Day" by Reginald Rose.

Heflin returned to Broadway to appear in a double bill of Arthur Miller's A View From the Bridge and A Memory of Two Mondays which ran for 149 performances under the direction of Martin Ritt.

Heflin had an excellent part in 3:10 to Yuma (1957) with Glenn Ford. He made a Western with Tab Hunter, his old Battle Cry co star, Gunman's Walk (1958). That was made for Columbia, with whom Heflin signed a contract to make one film a year for five years.

=== Europe ===
Heflin then went to Italy to star in Tempest (1959). He was billed after Gary Cooper and Rita Hayworth in They Came to Cordura (1959).

Heflin went back to Europe for Five Branded Women (1960), which he starred in for Martin Ritt, Under Ten Flags (1960), and The Wastrel (1961). In Hollywood he appeared on The Dick Powell Theatre.

Heflin went to the Philippines to star in a war film Cry of Battle (1963). This was playing at the Texas Theatre in Dallas on November 22, 1963. His name and the film title appear on the marquee. It was that theatre where Lee Harvey Oswald was apprehended in the aftermath of President Kennedy's assassination.

Heflin had another Broadway hit in the title role of A Case of Libel (1963–64) which ran for 242 performances.

=== Later career ===
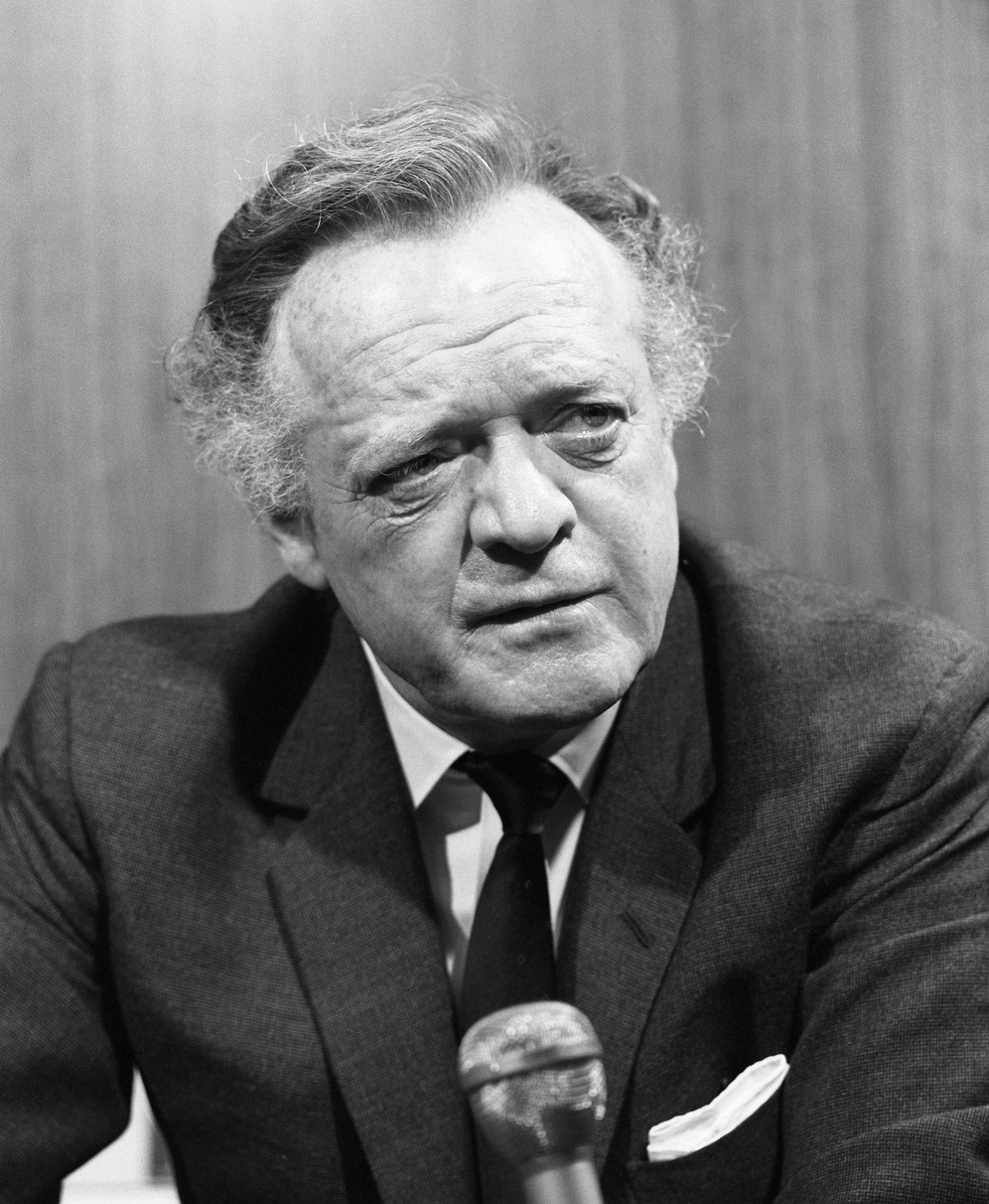
Van Heflin (1970)

Heflin appeared in a short but dramatic role as an eyewitness of Jesus' raising of Lazarus from death in the 1965 Bible film, The Greatest Story Ever Told.

Heflin returned to MGM for a support part in Once a Thief (1965). He was in the remake of Stagecoach (1966) and went to Europe to star in The Man Outside (1967) and Every Man for Himself (1968).

In the US he was in the TV movies A Case of Libel (1968), and Certain Honorable Men (1968) and he had a support part in The Big Bounce (1969).

Heflin's last feature film was Airport (1970). He played "D. O. Guerrero", a failure who schemes to blow himself up on an airliner so that his wife (played by Maureen Stapleton) can collect on a life insurance policy. It was an enormous success.

His last TV movies were Neither Are We Enemies (1970) and The Last Child (1971).

== Personal life ==
Heflin had a six-month marriage to actress Eleanor Shaw (née Eleanor Scherr) in the mid-thirties. In 1942, Heflin married RKO contract player Frances Neal. They had two daughters, actresses Vana O'Brien and Cathleen (Kate) Heflin, and a son, Tracy. The couple divorced in 1967.

Heflin was the grandfather of actor Ben O'Brien and actress Eleanor O'Brien. Van Heflin's sister Frances Heflin, nickname "Fra", regularly appeared as Mona Kane, mother of Erica, in the daytime television drama series All My Children. She played the role from January 5, 1970, until her death in June 1994.

He was also the uncle of Marta Heflin and Mady Kaplan, both actresses, and director Jonathan Kaplan. Heflin's brother, Martin, a public relations executive, was married to American theatre producer Julia Heflin.

== Death ==
On June 6, 1971, Heflin suffered a heart attack in his swimming pool. He was hospitalized at Cedars-Sinai Medical Center in Los Angeles for nearly seven weeks and apparently never regained consciousness. Heflin died on July 23, 1971, at the age of 62. He had left instructions requesting a private funeral. His cremated remains were scattered in the ocean.

== Recognition ==
In 1960, Heflin was honored with two stars on the Hollywood Walk of Fame, for his contributions to motion pictures at 6311 Hollywood Boulevard, and for television at 6125 Hollywood Boulevard. He was inducted into the Oklahoma Hall of Fame in 1964.

In February 2016, a biography, Van Heflin: A Life in Film, by Derek Sculthorpe, was published by McFarland & Company of Jefferson, North Carolina.

== Filmography ==
| Year | Title | Role | Notes |
|---|---|---|---|
| 1936 | A Woman Rebels | Lord Gerald Waring Gaythorne | |
| 1937 | The Outcasts of Poker Flat | Reverend Samuel 'Sam' Woods | |
| 1937 | Flight From Glory | George Wilson | |
| 1937 | Annapolis Salute | Clay V. Parker | |
| 1937 | Saturday's Heroes | Val Webster | |
| 1939 | Back Door to Heaven | John Shelley | |
| 1940 | Santa Fe Trail | Carl Rader | |
| 1941 | The Feminine Touch | Elliott Morgan | |
| 1941 | H.M. Pulham, Esq. | Bill King | |
| 1941 | Johnny Eager | Jeff Hartnett | Academy Award for Best Supporting Actor |
| 1942 | Kid Glove Killer | Gordon McKay | |
| 1942 | Grand Central Murder | 'Rocky' Custer | |
| 1942 | Seven Sweethearts | Henry Taggart | |
| 1942 | Tennessee Johnson | Andrew Johnson | |
| 1943 | Presenting Lily Mars | John Thornway | |
| 1943 | Screen Snapshots: Hollywood in Uniform | Himself | Short subject |
| 1944 | Land and Live in the Jungle | 1st Lieutenant Lynn Harrison | Uncredited / Documentary |
| 1945 | Land and Live in the Desert | Narrator | Uncredited / Short subject |
| 1946 | The Strange Love of Martha Ivers | Sam Masterson | |
| 1946 | Till the Clouds Roll By | James I. Hessler | |
| 1947 | Possessed | David Sutton | |
| 1947 | Green Dolphin Street | Timothy Haslam | |
| 1948 | B.F.'s Daughter | Thomas W. Brett | |
| 1948 | Tap Roots | Keith Alexander | |
| 1948 | The Secret Land | Narrator | Documentary |
| 1948 | The Three Musketeers | Athos | |
| 1949 | Act of Violence | Frank R. Enley | |
| 1949 | Madame Bovary | Charles Bovary | |
| 1949 | East Side, West Side | Mark Dwyer | |
| 1951 | Tomahawk | Jim Bridger | |
| 1951 | The Prowler | Webb Garwood | |
| 1951 | Week-End with Father | Brad Stubbs | |
| 1952 | My Son John | Stedman | |
| 1953 | South of Algiers | Nicholas Chapman | |
| 1953 | Shane | Joe Starrett | Nominated—BAFTA Award for Best Foreign Actor |
| 1953 | Wings of the Hawk | Irish Gallager | |
| 1954 | Tanganyika | John Gale | |
| 1954 | The Raid | Maj. Neal Benton / Neal Swayze | |
| 1954 | Woman's World | Jerry Talbot | |
| 1954 | Black Widow | Peter Denver | |
| 1955 | Battle Cry | Maj. Sam Huxley – CO, 2nd Bn., 6th Marine Regt. | |
| 1955 | Count Three and Pray | Luke Fargo | |
| 1956 | Patterns | Fred Staples | |
| 1957 | 3:10 to Yuma | Dan Evans | |
| 1958 | Gunman's Walk | Lee Hackett | |
| 1958 | Tempest | Emelyan Pugachov | |
| 1959 | They Came to Cordura | Sgt. John Chawk | |
| 1960 | Five Branded Women | Velko | |
| 1960 | Under Ten Flags | Captain Bernhard Rogge | |
| 1961 | The Wastrel | Duncan Bell | |
| 1963 | Cry of Battle | Joe Trent | |
| 1965 | The Greatest Story Ever Told | Bar Amand | |
| 1965 | Once a Thief | Inspector Mike Vido SFPD | |
| 1966 | Stagecoach | Marshal Curly Wilcox | |
| 1967 | The Man Outside | Bill MacLean | |
| 1968 | The Ruthless Four | Sam Cooper | |
| 1969 | The Big Bounce | Sam Mirakian | |
| 1970 | Airport | D.O. Guerrero | |
| 1971 | The Last Child | Senator Quincy George | Posthumous release |

== Television credits ==
| Year | Title | Role | Notes |
|---|---|---|---|
| 1950 | The Nash Airflyte Theater | Llano Kid | Episode: "A Double-Dyed Deceiver" |
| 1950 | Robert Montgomery Presents | Dr. Martin Arrowsmith | Episode: "Arrowsmith" |
| 1951 | The Ken Murray Show | Himself | Episode: "Van Heflin" |
| 1957–1960 | Playhouse 90 | Captain / Bill Kilcoyne / Col. Sten | 3 episodes |
| 1961 | The Dick Powell Show | Sergeant Paul Maxon | Episode: "Ricochet" |
| 1963–1964 | The Great Adventure | Himself – Narrator / Himself – Announcer | 13 episodes |
| 1965 | The Teenage Revolution | Narrator | Documentary |
| 1968 | A Case of Libel | Robert Sloane | Television film Nominated—Primetime Emmy Award for Outstanding Single Performance by an Actor in a Leading Role in a Drama |
| 1968 | The Danny Thomas Hour | Kreutzer | Episode: "Fear Is the Chain" |
| 1968 | Certain Honorable Men | Champ Donohue | Television film |
| 1970 | Neither Are We Enemies | Joseph of Arimathea | Television film |
| 1971 | The Last Child | Senator Quincy George | Television film, (final film role) |

== Radio appearances ==
| Year | Program | Episode/source |
|---|---|---|
| 1947 | The New Adventures of Philip Marlowe, NBC | Red Wind |
| 1949 | Lux Radio Theatre | Green Dolphin Street |
| 1953 | Theater of Stars | The Apple Tree |
| 1953 | Suspense | The Case of the Marie [sic] Celeste |
| 1953 | Suspense | The Shot |
