= Alfred Jaretzki III =

American surgeon (1919-2014)

Alfred Jaretzki
- Born: Alfred Jaretzki; August 11, 1919; Greenwich, Connecticut
- Died: May 29, 2014 (aged 94); New York City
- Education: Morristown School
- Alma mater: Harvard University; Harvard Medical School
- Occupations: Surgeon, professor
- Spouse(s): Sonia Lasell; Alexandra Moltke Isles
- Children: 4
- Parent(s): Alfred Jaretzki, Jr. Edna Astruck

Alfred Jaretzki III (August 11, 1919 – May 29, 2014) was an American surgeon and medical professor. Early in his career, he co-authored a seminal journal article on developing synthetic vascular glands, which informed the growth of practices in aortic aneurysm surgery.

Jaretzki served as a professor of clinical surgery at the Columbia University College of Physicians and Surgeons, a lecturer at the Columbia Presbyterian Hospital, and led the task force of the Medical Scientific Advisory Board of the Myasthenia Gravis Foundation of America.

== Early life and education ==
Jaretzki was born on August 11, 1919, in Greenwich, Connecticut, to Alfred Jaretzki, Jr. (1892-1976) and Edna Astruck. He graduated from the Morristown School (now Morristown-Beard School) in Morristown, New Jersey, in 1937. Jaretzki then earned his bachelor's degree at Harvard University in Cambridge, Massachusetts, in 1941. During his undergraduate studies at Harvard, Jaretzki played on the junior varsity football team, and he served as treasurer of The Harvard Lampoon, a humor magazine.

Jaretzki completed his medical degree at Harvard Medical School in 1944 and his internship at Columbia-Presbyterian Hospital. In 2002, the Society of the Alumni of the Presbyterian Hospital awarded Jaretzki their Distinguished Alumni Award during a ceremony at Low Memorial Library at Columbia University.

== Career ==
At the beginning of his career, he co-authored a seminal journal article on developing synthetic vascular glands, which informed the growth of practices in aortic aneurism surgery. Later in his career, Jaretzki served as president of the New York Thoracic Society. He also led the seven-member Task Force of the Medical Scientific Advisory Board of the Myasthenia Gravis Foundation of America. The task force developed the 2000 report Myasthenia Gravis: Recommendations for Clinical Research Standards.

Jaretzki served as a professor of clinical surgery at the Columbia University College of Physicians and Surgeons, and as a lecturer at the Columbia Presbyterian Hospital.

=== Cooperstown Planning Commission ===
During the 1960s, Jaretzki worked as a physician at the Mary Imogene Bassett Hospital in Cooperstown, New York, the home of the National Baseball Hall of Fame and Museum. While living in the Cooperstown area, Jaretzki served as a founding member of the Cooperstown Planning Commission. The Commission developed the 1962 Cooperstown Area Plan for Cooperstown, New York, and its immediate vicinity.

== Personal life ==
Jaretzki married Sonia Lasell in 1945. They divorced in the early 1960s. He was married to Alexandra Moltke Isles (born 1947) who had previously been married to Philip Henry Isles II of the Lehman banking family. His children were:

- Alfred Jaretzki IV
- Lasell Bartlett Jaretzki
- Alexander Jaretzki
- Sumner Jaretzki

Jaretzki died on May 29, 2014.
