= Charles Dingle =

American actor (1887–1956)

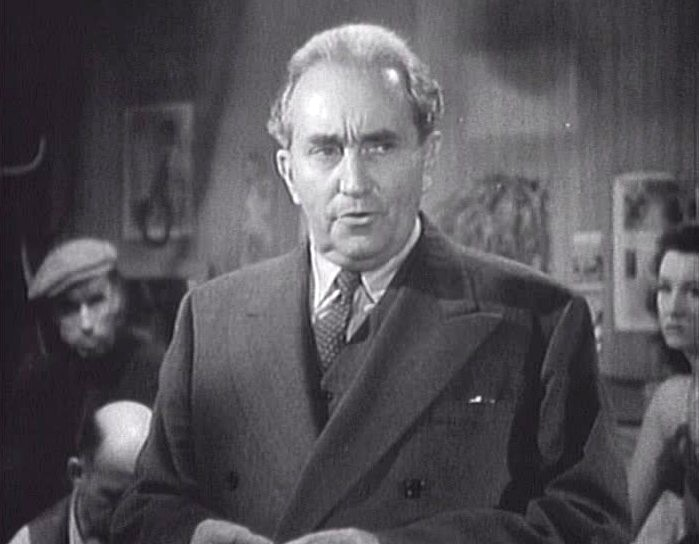
- Charles Dingle in Lady of Burlesque (1943)
- Born: December 28, 1887; Wabash, Indiana, U.S.
- Died: January 19, 1956 (aged 68); Worcester, Massachusetts, U.S.
- Occupation: Actor
- Years active: 1928–1955
- Spouse: Dorothea White
- Children: 2

Charles Dingle (December 28, 1887 – January 19, 1956) was an American stage and film actor.

== Early life ==
Dingle was born December 28, 1887, in Wabash, Indiana, and raised in Indianapolis. His father was John Crockett Dingle, and he was said to be a descendant of Davy Crockett. When he was 14 years old he quit school and began acting.

== Career ==
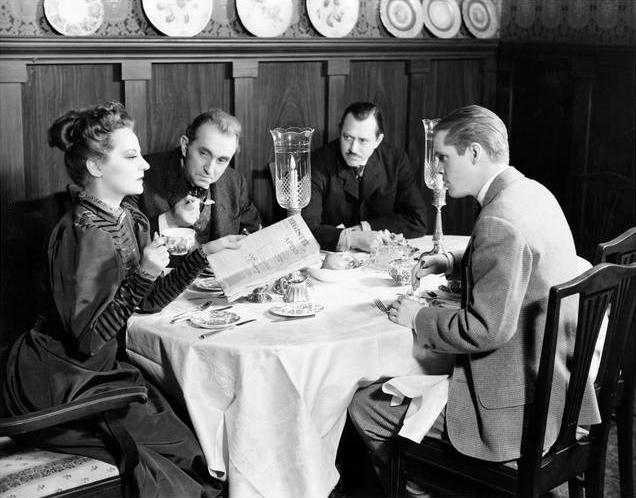
Tallulah Bankhead, Charles Dingle, Carl Benton Reid and Dan Duryea in the original Broadway production of The Little Foxes (1939)

Dingle's dramatic debut came in a production of Forgiven. At age 14 he portrayed a 65-year-old man. When he was 18, he became the Woodward Stock Company's leading man. In 1914 he was the Fosberg Players' leading man.

He began selling real estate in New Jersey in 1927, but he made his Broadway debut in Killers in 1928. After that he again sold real estate, but decreasing sales led him back to acting. Better roles followed including Duke Theseus in the 1932 revival of A Midsummer Night's Dream and Sheriff Cole in Let Freedom Ring in 1935. He made his musical debut in Irving Berlin's Miss Liberty in 1950.

A veteran of over 50 feature films, he was best known for portraying hard edged businessmen and villains, such as Ben Hubbard, the crafty eldest member of the Hubbard family in The Little Foxes on both stage and screen, and Senator Brockway in the film version of Call Me Madam.

Critic Bosley Crowther wrote of his performance in the film version of The Little Foxes in The New York Times that Dingle was a "perfect villain in respectable garb".

His last stage appearance was in 1954's The Immoralist co-starring Louis Jourdan, Geraldine Page and James Dean; it was also Dean's last Broadway appearance.

== Personal life and death ==
Dingle was married to actress Dorothy L. White. He had two sons. He died on January 19, 1956, after a brief illness at age 68 in Worcester Memorial Hospital in Worcester, Massachusetts. He was cremated and his ashes scattered in Germany.

== Partial filmography ==
- Du Barry Did All Right (1937, Short) - John Wainwright
- ...One Third of a Nation... (1939) - Mr. Rogers
- The Little Foxes (1941) - Ben Hubbard
- Unholy Partners (1941) - Clyde Fenton
- Johnny Eager (1941) - Marco
- Are Husbands Necessary? (1942) - Duncan Atterbury
- Calling Dr. Gillespie (1942) - Dr. Ward O. Kenwood
- The Talk of the Town (1942) - Andrew Holmes
- Somewhere I'll Find You (1942) - George L. Stafford
- George Washington Slept Here (1942) - Mr. Prescott
- Tennessee Johnson (1942) - Senator Jim Waters
- Edge of Darkness (1943) - Kaspar Torgerson
- Lady of Burlesque (1943) - Inspector Harrigan
- Someone to Remember (1943) - Jim Parsons
- She's for Me (1943) - Crane
- The Song of Bernadette (1943) - Jacomet
- Home in Indiana (1944) - Godaw Boole
- The National Barn Dance (1944) - Mr. Garvey
- Together Again (1944) - Morton Buchanan
- Here Come the Co-Eds (1945) - Jonathan Kirkland
- A Medal for Benny (1945) - Zach Mibbe
- Guest Wife (1945) - Arthur Truesdale Worth
- Cinderella Jones (1946) - Minland
- The Wife of Monte Cristo (1946) - Danglars
- Centennial Summer (1946) - J.P. Snodgrass
- Three Wise Fools (1946) - Paul Badger
- Sister Kenny (1946) - Michael Kenny
- The Beast with Five Fingers (1946) - Raymond Arlington
- Duel in the Sun (1946) - Sheriff Hardy
- My Favorite Brunette (1947) - Major Simon Montague
- Welcome Stranger (1947) - Charles 'C.J.' Chesley
- The Romance of Rosy Ridge (1947) - John Dessark
- If You Knew Susie (1948) - Mr. Whitley
- State of the Union (1948) - Bill Nolard Hardy
- A Southern Yankee (1948) - Col. Weatherby
- Big Jack (1949) - Mathias Taylor
- Never Wave at a WAC (1953) - Sen. Tom Reynolds
- Call Me Madam (1953) - Sen. Brockway
- The President's Lady (1953) - Capt. Irwin
- Half a Hero (1953) - Mr. Bascomb
- The Court-Martial of Billy Mitchell (1955) - Sen. Fullerton (final film role)
