= Felicia Montealegre =

Costa Rican and American actress (1922–1978)

- Publicity photo, December 10, 1957
- Born: Felicia María Cohn Montealegre; February 6, 1922; San José, Costa Rica
- Died: June 16, 1978 (aged 56); East Hampton, New York, U.S.
- Burial place: Green-Wood Cemetery
- Education: Herbert Berghof Studio; Dramatic Workshop
- Occupation: Actress
- Television: Kraft Television Theatre; Studio One; Suspense; Omnibus; The Philco Television Playhouse
- Spouse: Leonard Bernstein (m. 1951)
- Children: 3

Felicia Montealegre Bernstein (née Felicia María Cohn Montealegre; February 6, 1922 – June 16, 1978) was a Costa Rican and American actress.

Montealegre appeared in televised dramas and theatrical roles. She also performed with symphony orchestras in dramatic acting and narrating roles. Her collaborators included her husband Leonard Bernstein.

== Early life and education ==
Felicia María Cohn Montealegre was born on February 6, 1922, in San José, Costa Rica. Her mother, Clemencia Cristina Montealegre Carazo, was Costa Rican; her father, Roy Elwood Cohn, was a United States mining executive stationed in Costa Rica. Felicia had two sisters, Nancy Alessandri and Madeline Lecaros. Mariano Montealegre Bustamante, the first vice head of state of Costa Rica, was her great-great-grandfather.

Felicia moved to Chile at age one and was educated at the French School of Nuns. She was raised Catholic and later converted to Judaism before marrying Leonard Bernstein. Her paternal grandfather was Jewish.

== Career ==
=== Broadway and theatrical career ===
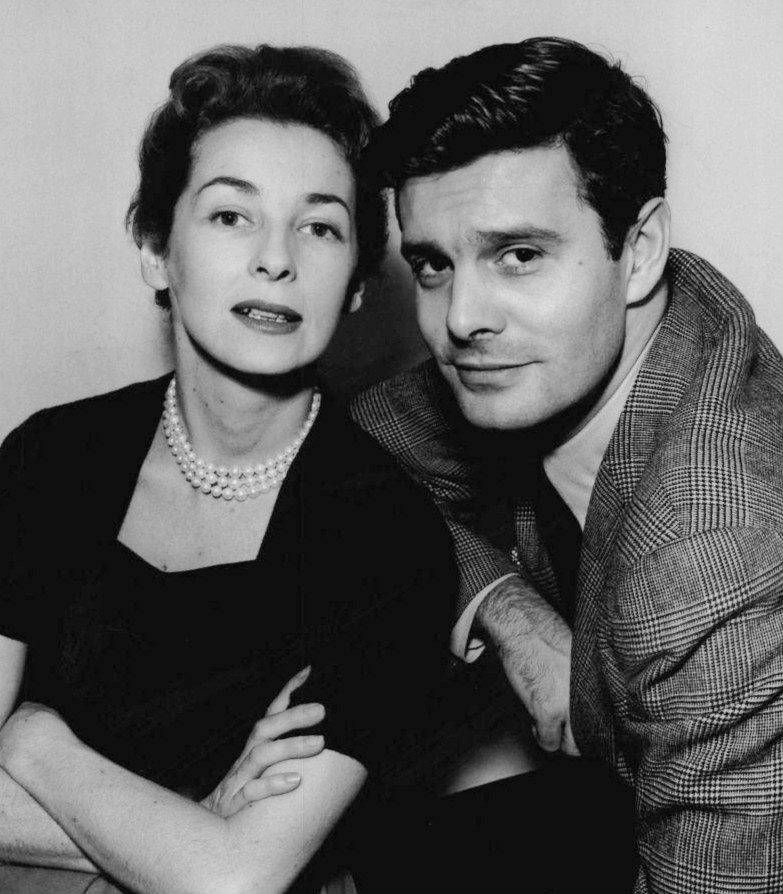
Montealegre visiting her friend Louis Jourdan during his Broadway production of Tonight in Samarkand (1955)

In 1944 at age 21, Montealegre established herself in New York, where she took piano lessons from Chilean pianist Claudio Arrau. Upon her arrival in New York, Montealegre started acting lessons with Herbert Berghof at the Dramatic Workshop of the New School for Social Research. She then continued studying with him at his newly founded acting school, HB Studio. In April 1945, Montealegre made her first New York acting appearance in the English-language premiere of Federico Garcia Lorca's If Five Years Pass at the Provincetown Playhouse. Montealegre made her Broadway debut on July 20, 1946, at the Booth Theatre as the ingénue in Ben Hecht's Swan Song. In 1950, she was an understudy to Leora Dana in Samuel A. Taylor's The Happy Time on Broadway, starring Eva Gabor and Montealegre's then-lover Richard Hart.

Montealegre's Shakespearean roles included Jessica in a 1953 production of The Merchant of Venice at New York City Center and as Katharine in Henry V in a 1956 production at the Cambridge Drama Festival in Cambridge, Massachusetts. Her other notable stage appearances include as Margot Wendice in Dial M for Murder at the Palm Beach Playhouse (Florida) in 1957 and Sally Bowles in Van Druten's I Am a Camera at the North Jersey Playhouse, starring alongside her lifelong friend and colleague Michael (Mendy) Wager.

Montealegre returned to the Broadway stage in 1967 to play Birdie Hubbard in Lillian Hellman's The Little Foxes directed by family friend Mike Nichols. She made her Metropolitan Opera debut in 1973 as Andromache in Berlioz's opera Les Troyens, the work's first staging in New York City. Montealegre made her final Broadway appearance in the 1976 play Poor Murderer, directed by her former acting teacher, Herbert Berghof.

=== Television career ===
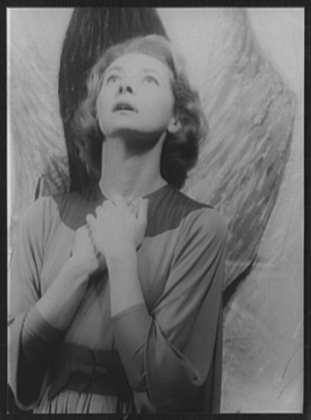
Montealegre as Joan in Honegger's Joan of Arc at the Stake, May 9, 1958; photo by Carl Van Vechten

Beginning in 1949, Montealegre starred in leading roles on weekly television anthology dramas for Kraft Television Theatre (NBC), Studio One (CBS), Suspense (CBS), The Chevrolet Tele-Theatre (NBC) and The Philco Television Playhouse (NBC), among others. Montealegre made her television debut on NBC's Kraft Television Theatre on May 11, 1949, as Hygieia in Mary Violet Heberden's The Oath of Hippocrates, alongside actors Dean Harens and Guy Spaull. In 1950, she appeared in the leading role of Nora Helmer in Henrik Ibsen's A Doll's House, with John Newland as Krogstad and Theodore Newton as Thorvald.

She made her first appearance on the CBS Television Network's Studio One in the psychological thriller Flowers from a Stranger, which aired on May 25, 1949, with actor Yul Brynner. She acted in 11 Studio One teleplays between 1949 and 1956, including Of Human Bondage (aired November 21, 1949), based on W. Somerset Maugham's novel in which Montealegre played Mildred opposite Charlton Heston as Philip Carey. In 1952, she co-starred alongside Heston again in The Wings of the Dove, based on the 1902 novel by Henry James.

Montealegre appeared in four episodes of the CBS series Suspense (1949–1954), live teleplays featuring people in dangerous situations. She appeared first in an episode entitled "The Yellow Scarf" (aired June 7, 1949), where she played housekeeper Hettie, who finds herself in a strange scenario involving her mysterious employer Mr. Bronson, portrayed by Boris Karloff, and a social mission worker, Tom Weatherby, played by Douglass Watson. The other three episodes were "The Tip" (1950), "Death Sabre" (1951), and "An Affair with a Ghost" (1954).

=== Dramatic works with orchestra ===
In 1957, Montealegre performed her first dramatic role in a classical music concert as the narrator in Lukas Foss's Parable of Death, based on the mystical poem by Rilke, for a concert of the Syracuse Friends of Chamber Music. She performed the title role of Joan in Arthur Honegger's Joan of Arc at the Stake (French: Jeanne d'Arc au bûcher) several times, including in 1958 with her husband, Leonard Bernstein, conducting the New York Philharmonic and Leontyne Price in the role of Margaret. Bernstein wrote the narration for his Symphony No. 3: Kaddish with Montealegre in mind, and she narrated its American premiere with soprano Jennie Tourel and Charles Munch conducting the Boston Symphony Orchestra on January 31, 1964.

== Social activism ==
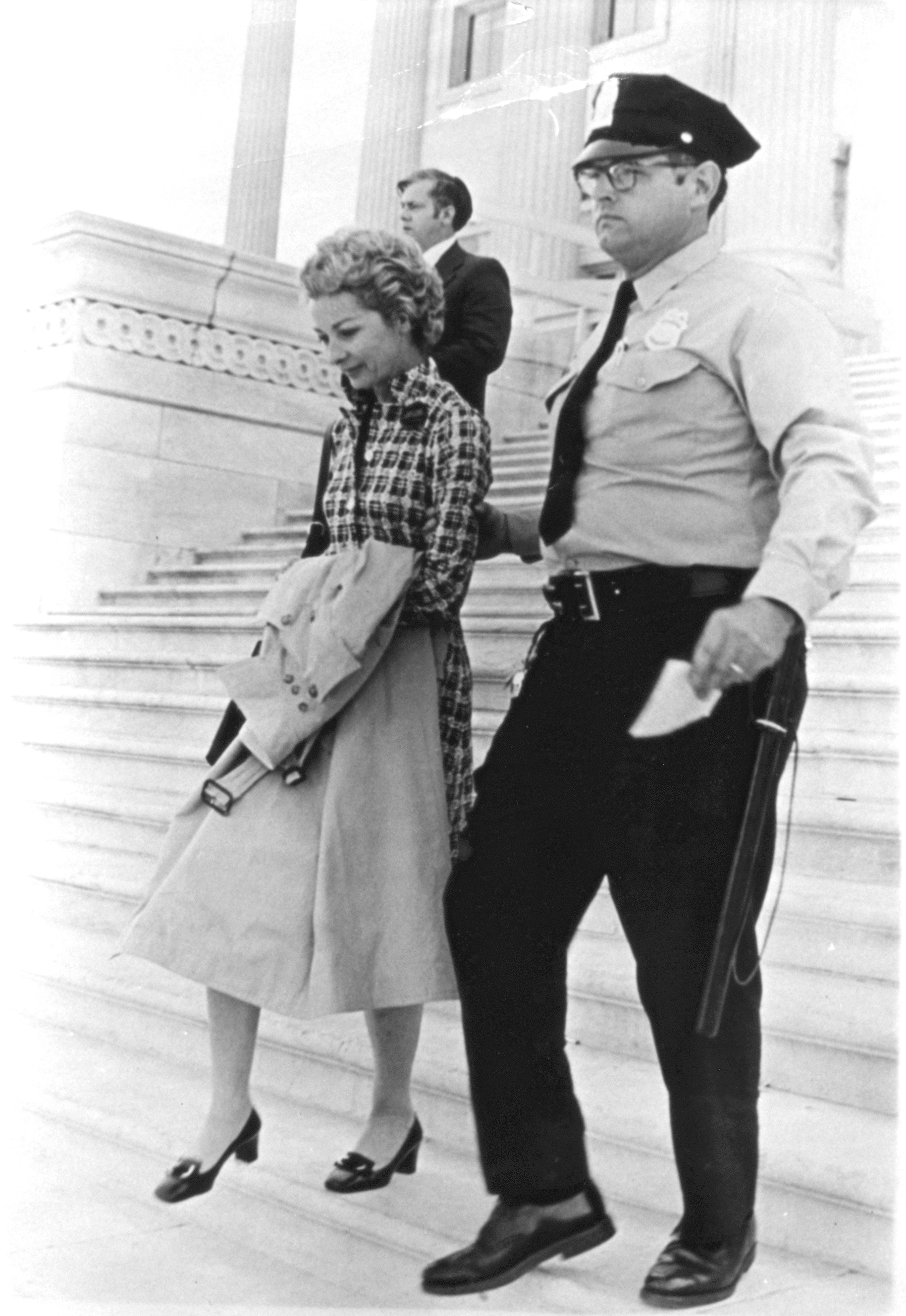
Montealegre arrested on the steps of the United States Capitol Building, 1972

In 1963, Montealegre became the first chair of the Women's Division of the New York Civil Liberties Union, where her efforts focused on educational programs and fundraising events. Montealegre told the San Francisco Examiner in 1964, "It's amazing how little even knowledgeable people know about the Constitution and what people are fighting for."

Montealegre supported the antiwar grassroots campaign Another Mother for Peace. Initiated on Mother's Day of 1967, volunteers mailed postcards to President Lyndon B. Johnson and members of Congress with the message, "War is not healthy for children and other living things. Talk peace." Two years later, she was also one of 100 individuals arrested in an antiwar protest in Washington, DC.

On January 14, 1970, Montealegre hosted a fundraiser at the Bernsteins' Park Avenue apartment to support the families of Panther 21, members of the Black Panther Party who had been jailed for nine months without set trial dates or financial resources to cover legal fees and their families' economic hardships. The next day, Charlotte Curtis described the event in The New York Times, and by June, Montealegre became a critical focus of Tom Wolfe's New York magazine cover story "Radical Chic: That Party at Lenny's". The story popularized the term "radical chic". Montealegre sharply condemned the response in a letter to The New York Times, writing: "The frivolous way in which it was reported as a 'fashionable' event is ... offensive to all people who are committed to humanitarian principles of justice." In the aftermath, the Bernsteins' residence was picketed by Jewish Defense League protesters, and the family received hate mail. Many years later, Leonard Bernstein's FBI file revealed the Bureau fabricated the letters and staged agents to foment the protests.

As vice chairman of the Citizens' Inquiry on Parole and Criminal Justice, Inc., Montealegre co-authored a March 1974 report of the New York State parole system, in collaboration with Coretta Scott King, Victor Marrero, Ramsey Clark, and others. The report criticized the theory behind and practice of the New York State Board of Parole and recommended its abolishment as an institution, provided an alternative could be found. She explained its aim was "to awaken the public and to tell the inmates themselves what to expect".

Montealegre worked behind the scenes for Amnesty International in Chile during its political unrest of the 1970s. In memory of his late wife, Leonard Bernstein established the Felicia Montealegre Bernstein Fund of Amnesty International USA. The first of its kind, the Fund provided crucial organizing assistance and technological resources to support human rights activities.

== Personal life and death ==
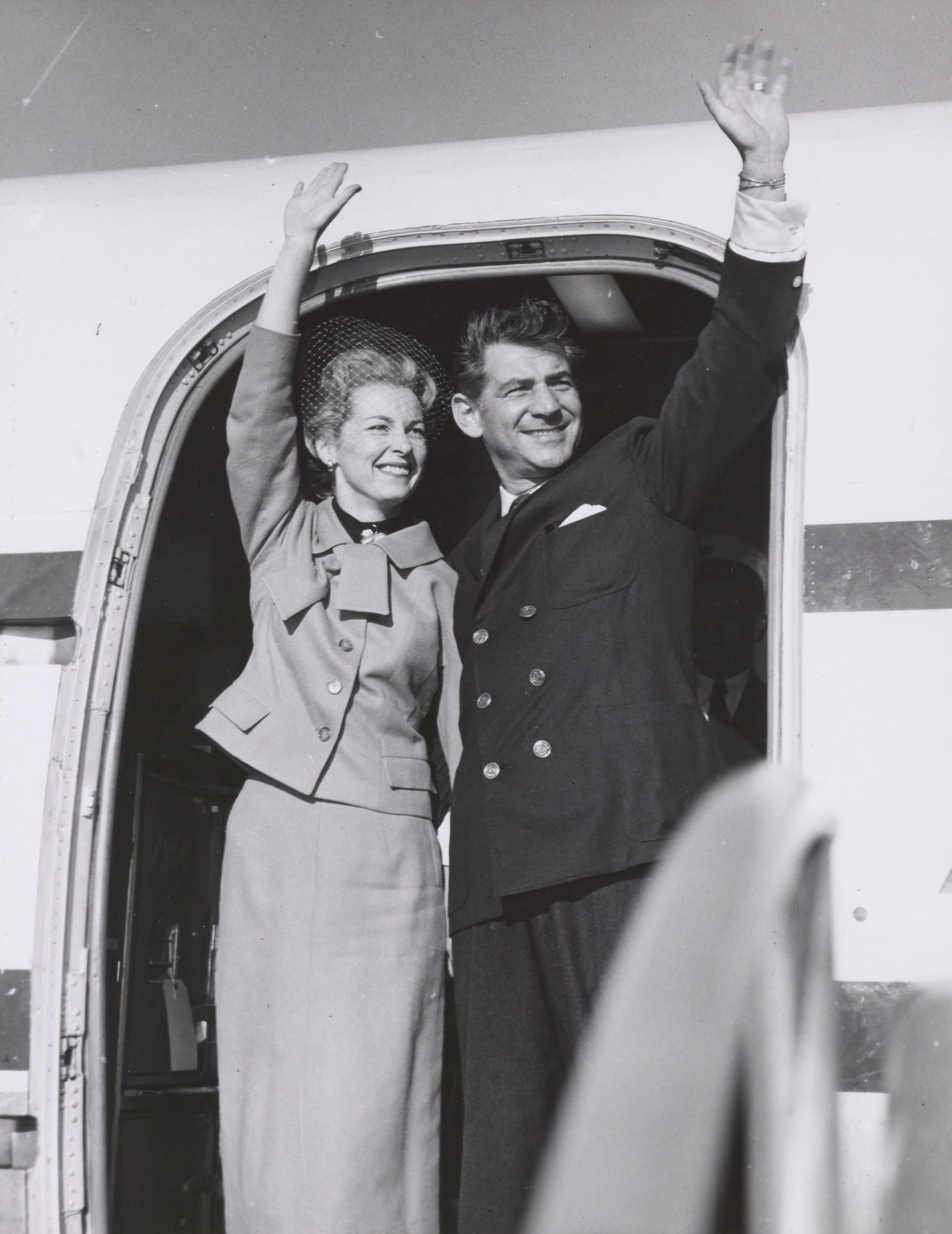
Felicia and Leonard Bernstein leaving for Israel, 1957

Montealegre met composer-conductor Leonard Bernstein in 1946 at a party given by Claudio Arrau. After their first engagement to be married was broken off, she had a relationship with actor Richard Hart until his death on January 2, 1951. Bernstein and she married on September 9, 1951, and had three children: Jamie, Alexander, and Nina.

The Bernsteins regularly hosted parties and welcomed friends into their home. Family friend and photographer John Gruen remarked, "There was always food, generosity and merriment, word games and puzzles ... It gave our lives a panache in those years." Montealegre maintained close friendships with many artists and intellectuals, including Marc Blitzstein, Lillian Hellman, Jennie Tourel, Richard Avedon, Martha Gellhorn, Stephen Sondheim, Cynthia O'Neal, and Michael "Mendy" Wager, with whom she kept regular correspondence.

Montealegre was a fashion icon, who often gave the first showing of new designer looks at public events. By making the New York Philharmonic season-opening concerts a fashionable event, her appearances inspired new audiences to engage with classical music. In a 1958 interview with The New York Times, she said, "Fads can become serious. Some people may attend to show off their mink, find they enjoy the music and become devoted to the Philharmonic." Her wardrobe was reported in the press, and she was noted for her impeccable taste. Montealegre designed the interiors of each of the Bernsteins' family homes, along with professional decorator and friend Gail Jacobs.

Montealegre was hailed by the Guild of Professional Beauticians as one of "The Ten Best Coiffured Women of 1964" along with well-known female contemporaries such as Eileen Ford, Anne Klein, and Debbie Reynolds. She also cut hair for her friends and family. When she met pianist Glenn Gould for the first time, she immediately decided he needed a haircut. Bernstein recalled, "Before I knew it, Felicia—before 'Have a drink' or anything —had him in the bathroom, washed his hair and cut it, and he emerged from the bathroom looking like an angel."

In her spare time, Montealegre took up painting and studied with postwar artists Daniel Schwartz and Jane Wilson, wife of John Gruen.

Montealegre died of breast cancer that had metastasized to her lungs in East Hampton, New York, on June 16, 1978, at the age of 56.

== Acting credits ==
=== Television ===
| Year | Title | Role(s) | Notes |
|---|---|---|---|
| 1949–1956 | Kraft Television Theatre | Various | 11 episodes |
| 1949–1956 | Studio One | Various | 11 episodes |
| 1949–1954 | Suspense | Various | 4 episodes |
| 1949 | The Chevrolet Tele-Theatre | Christine Vole | season 2, episode 7: "The Witness for the Prosecution" |
| 1949 | The Silver Theatre | | season 1, episode 6: "Patient Unknown" |
| 1950 | Lights Out | | season 2, episode 27: "The Emerald Lavalier" |
| 1950 | Starlight Theatre | | season 1, episode 20: "Forgotten Melody" |
| 1950 | The Philco Television Playhouse | Various | 4 episodes |
| 1951 | Lights Out | Leda | season 3, episode 29: "Leda's Portrait" |
| 1951 | Lux Video Theatre | Viola Cole | season 1, episode 15: "The Purple Doorknob" |
| 1952 | Goodyear Theatre | Empress Carlotta Amelia | season 1, episode 10: "Crown of Shadows" |
| 1953 | The Web | | season 3, episode 40: "Encore" |
| 1953 | The Revlon Mirror Theater | | season 1, episode 5: "The Enormous Radio" |
| 1954 | Goodyear Theatre | | season 3, episode 7: "Moment of Panic" |
| 1954 | You Are There | | season 2, episode 35: "The Death of Rasputin" |
| 1955 | Person to Person | Self | season 3, episode 4 |
| 1956 | The Kaiser Aluminum Hour | Ismene | season 1, episode 5: Antigone |
| 1957 | Omnibus | Self | season 6, episode 11: "Bernstein: A Musical Travelogue" |
| 1961 | Play of the Week | | season 2, episode 21: "The Sound of Murder" |
| 1966 | The Match Game | Self | season 5, episode 46 |
| 1968 | The Merv Griffin Show | Self | season 5, episode 94 |
| 1977 | Camera Three | Self | season 22, episode 29: Façade |

=== Theatre ===
| Year | Title | Role(s) | Notes |
|---|---|---|---|
| 1953 | The Merchant of Venice | Jessica | New York City Center |
| 1967 | The Little Foxes | Birdie Hubbard | Ethel Barrymore Theatre, Broadway |
| 1976 | Poor Murderer | Fourth Actress | Ethel Barrymore Theatre, Broadway |

== In popular culture ==
Montealegre features prominently in Tom Wolfe's 1970 essay "Radical Chic: That Party at Lenny's".

Carey Mulligan portrayed Montealegre in Bradley Cooper's 2023 drama film Maestro which chronicles her relationship with Bernstein (played by Cooper), for which she was nominated for Academy Award for Best Actress.
