= The Little White Horse =

1946 novel by Elizabeth Goudge

- First edition
- Author: Elizabeth Goudge
- Illustrator: C. Walter Hodges; Anne Yvonne Gilbert (1992)
- Cover artist: C. Walter Hodges; Anne Yvonne Gilbert (1992)
- Language: English
- Genre: Children's Fairytale
- Publisher: University of London Press
- Publication date: June 1946
- Publication place: United Kingdom
- Media type: Print (hardcover)
- Pages: 286 pp (first edition)
- OCLC: 12658611
- LC Class: PZ7.G71 Li

The Little White Horse is a low fantasy children's novel by Elizabeth Goudge, first published by the University of London Press in 1946 with illustrations by C. Walter Hodges, and Anne Yvonne Gilbert in 1992. Coward–McCann published a US edition next year. Set in 1842, it features a recently orphaned teenage girl who is sent to the manor house of her cousin and guardian in the West Country of England. The estate, village, and vicinity are shrouded in mystery and magic; the "little white horse" is a unicorn.

Goudge won the annual Carnegie Medal from the Library Association, recognizing the year's best children's book by a British subject. It has been adapted for film and television.

WorldCat Participating libraries report holding editions in 11 translation languages.

== Plot summary ==
Maria Merryweather became an orphan at age 13 on her father's death in 1842. She is sent to Moonacre Manor in England's West Country, accompanied by her governess Miss Heliotrope, and her dog Wiggins. There she finds herself in a world out of time. Her cousin and guardian Sir Benjamin Merryweather is one of the "sun" Merryweathers, and she loves him right away, as "sun" and "moon" Merryweathers do. Maria discovers that there is an ancient mystery about the founding of the estate.

Various creatures assist Maria, but it is by self-sacrifice and perseverance that she can save Moonacre. It leads to right the wrongs, reunite lost loves, and finally bring peace to the valley.

== Characters ==
- Maria Merryweather – A smart, 13-year-old orphan with red hair and freckles. She rescues a hare in the forest, names it Serena, and keeps it as her pet. Wears large dresses. Her love interest is Robin.
- Miss Jane Heliotrope – Maria's governess. She is old-fashioned and very tall, with forget-me-not-blue eyes. Her love interest is the Old Parson. The love interest in the movie is Digweed.
- Sir Benjamin Merryweather – Maria's uncle and guardian. His love interest is Loveday.
- Marmaduke Scarlet – Sir Benjamin's cook and housekeeper. Also the owner of Zachariah the cat. He does not like feminine curiosity and sees his kitchen as a private domain. He is a wonderful chef. Nice to Maria.
- Digweed – Sir Benjamin's coachman and gardener. His love interest in the movie is Miss Heliotrope.
- Loveday Minette – Sir Benjamin's ex-fiancée. She is known in the book to have a passion for pink geraniums. When their argument broke out about the geraniums, she left Moonacre and got married in town to a lawyer. In the movie, she is Robin's older sister and Benjamin's ex-fiancée but they end up together.
- Robin – The son of Loveday Minette. In the movie, he was Loveday's younger brother. His love interest is Maria. He wears a leather jacket, a scarf, a bowler hat, and feathers around his neck.
- Old Parson – The parson who helps Maria give Paradise Hill back to God. His real name is Louis de Fontenelle and he was Miss Heliotrope's childhood sweetheart.
- Henry – Robin's best friend.
- Monsieur Coque de Noir – the black-hearted owner of the castle in the pine wood and leader of a wicked band. Hates the Merryweathers and will do anything to see their downfall.

=== The animals ===
- Zachariah – Marmaduke's special cat. He helps out Maria and Robin. He writes messages in the ashes in the kitchen fireplace.
- Wrolf (pronounced Rolf) – A black lion who acts as Maria's special protector, called a dog by Sir Benjamin and others.
- Serena – A Moonacre hare that Maria saved from hunters.
- Wiggins – Maria's greedy King Charles Spaniel.
- Periwinkle – Maria's grey pony whose other name is Joy-of-the-Ground. She is a feisty little pony.
- White Unicorn – Maria’s unicorn. Shows up to Maria in times of need. Only visible to a true moon princess.

== Adaptations ==
The 1994 television mini-series Moonacre was loosely based on The Little White Horse.

In 2008, the book was very loosely adapted into the film The Secret of Moonacre, written by Lucy Shuttleworth and Graham Alborough and directed by Gabor Csupo. Starring Dakota Blue Richards as Maria, the movie was mostly shot in Hungary and released in February 2009.

== Influence ==
J. K. Rowling, the author of the Harry Potter books, has said that The Little White Horse was her favourite childhood book.

Awards
| Preceded by The Wind on the Moon | Carnegie Medal recipient 1946 | Succeeded by Collected Stories for Children |
