= Gyaltsen =

Gyaltsen may refer to:

- Choekyi Gyaltsen (1938–1989), the 10th Panchen Lama of Gelug School of Tibetan Buddhism
- Dolpopa Sherab Gyaltsen (1292–1361), the Tibetan Buddhist master known as "The Buddha from Dolpo"
- Jetsun Dragpa Gyaltsen (1147–1216), Tibetan spiritual leader and the third of the Five Venerable Supreme Sakya Masters of Tibet
- Indrani Aikath Gyaltsen (born 1952), freelance journalist from Chaibasa, Bihar
- Jamphel Yeshe Gyaltsen (1910–1947), Tibetan tulku and the fifth Reting Rinpoche
- Khunu Lama Tenzin Gyaltsen (1895–1977), known also as Tenzin Gyaltsen Negi, Khunu Rinpoche and Negi Lama
- Lobsang Chökyi Gyaltsen (1570–1662), the fourth Panchen Lama of Tibet, and the first to be accorded this title during his lifetime
- Shardza Tashi Gyaltsen (1859–1933 or 1935), great Dzogchen master of the Tibetan Bonpo tradition
- Tai Situ Changchub Gyaltsen (1302–1364 (or ?1371)), key figure in Tibetan History
- Tulku Dragpa Gyaltsen (1619–1656), important Gelugpa lama and a contemporary of the Fifth Dalai Lama (1617–1682)
