= Cynthia Knott =

American painter

- Born: Cynthia Knott; March 20, 1952 (age 73); Newark, New Jersey, U.S.
- Education: School of the Museum of Fine Arts, Boston; School of Visual Arts, New York; New York University
- Known for: Painting
- Awards: Pollock-Krasner Foundation Grant Awards; The Ballinglen Arts Foundation Fellowship; New York Foundation for the Arts Fellowship

Cynthia Knott (March 20, 1952) is an American painter known for her horizontally-oriented seascapes that recall the "multiforms" of Mark Rothko and the later work of J. M. W. Turner.

== Biography ==
Cynthia Knott received her BA from the School of the Museum of Fine Arts, Boston in 1971. She went on to earn her BFA at the School of Visual Arts, New York, in 1975 and her MFA at New York University in 1989. Prior to pursuing art, Knott attended Washington University in St. Louis, intending to study Marine Biology. She dropped out after a year after realizing she wanted to pursue her interest in drawing.

Knott's study of and artistic interest in the ocean draws upon family history. Her great-grandfather was an Irish sea captain. Her series, "Migration," refers to the Atlantic voyage made by her family from Ireland by boat.

== Work ==
Knott began her career as an artist as a color field painter, inspired by the work of Mark Rothko. She became interested in landscape after visiting upstate New York and the work by the Hudson River School. She then began to take interest in landscape artists such as Turner, Constable, and Whistler. Similar to Rothko's multiform paintings, Knott's work consists of "horizontal bands of monochromatic colors".

Knott's other influences include the fluorescent work of Dan Flavin, the linear abstraction of Barnett Newman, the color field work of Helen Frankenthaler, the landscapes of Jane Wilson, Hokusai's The Great Wave off Kanagawa, and wave and ocean scenes of Winslow Homer.

Knott has been called a "horizonologist" by her friend, poet Billy Collins. Much of Knott's work explores the tension and fluidity between sky and sea, expressed through her treatment of the horizon as observed through different times of the day and light-quality and different weather conditions:

I saw a physical apparition of a horizon line coming and going and could not figure out what it was. Off Gardiner's Island is Cartwright Shoal, which only appears a low tide. It comes up and then goes away. When I saw it the first time, I saw white, and this beautiful Naples yellow with the sun shining on it. That's where my gold horizon line came from. It was physically in place, but a very temporary place.

=== Process ===
Knott primes the canvas with a layer of sizing. This tightens the linen surface, which she builds up by painting the rabbit skin glue with back-and-forth brushstrokes. This creates texture that serves to enhance the play of light in her paintings.

Next, Knott prepares the linen surface to receive color with a layer of white gesso.

For the final step before beginning work on the overpainting, Knott adds the underpainting, using a coat of ground copper paint and then a layer of gold paint.

Knott vigorously paints and re-paints her work, a technique she discovered in a book on Albert Pinkham Ryder. For instance, at the end of a day of painting, Knott may scrape off her work with a palette knife, leaving "a skin of memory and process" that becomes a faint stain of the day's work. She refers to this re-working as a "process of memory". She uses encaustic, which is a thick combination of beeswax, linseed oil, Damar varnish, and metallic pigments alongside more traditional use of gesso and oil paint to "push" an effect of luminosity.

Knott often paints her seascapes en plein air. She said that "The only way you can really understand light is to look at it. You have to be out there and see those clouds going by." Many of her paintings depict coastal views near her home, Springs, NY in the north of East Hampton (town), New York—including Cartwright Shoal in Gardiner's Bay. For nocturnal scenes, Knott has painted a local salt marsh, which has a luminescent glow.

== Interest in poetry ==
In the earlier years of her career, Knott also turned to poets who were inspired by nature and the landscape such as Wordsworth. Knott is also inspired by the poetry of W. B. Yeats and Emily Dickinson.

=== Billy Collins ===
Knott is additionally inspired by the poetry of Billy Collins, a close friend. Collins has gone out with her to paint en plein air and offer his advice. For instance, Collins has directly influenced her use of one-word, evocative titles after criticizing her title "Poet's Prayer" as non-sensical.

In turn, a few of Collins's poems are inspired by Knott's paintings. A United States Poet Laureate, Collins dedicated a poem inspired by his experience gazing at her seascapes. His poem, "Paintings of the Sea (For Cynthia Knott)", was reproduced in conjunction with Knott's exhibition Gardiners Bay, from May 8 to Jaune 14, 2002. Another poem, "Horizon," which was published in his 2005 poetry collection The Art of Drowning, is also inspired by her work.

== Articles ==
- Carmichael, Isabel. “An Alchemist Who Channels the Ineffable,” The East Hampton Star, August 18, 2011, illus. C1, C8
- Brandeis, Magdalene. “The Sea and the Sky: Paintings by Cynthia Knott, Poems by Billy Collins,” The Southampton Review, vol. III No. 1, Spring 2009, illus pp. 19, 21, 23, 25, 27, 29.
- Norwich, John. “Cynthia Knott Horizonologist,” Hampton Jitney Magazine, vol. 9, Spring 2004 pp. 12–15.
- Goodman, Jonathan. "Anne Harris and Cynthia Knott at DC Moore." Art in America (February 2003): pp. 117–18.
- Weil, Rex. "Heaven in Earth." ARTnews (March 1998): pp. 150–152.
- Wolberg Weiss, Marion. "Honoring the Artist: Cynthia Knott." Dan's Papers (August 4, 1995): pp. 78–79.
