= Stella Whitelaw =

British writer and journalist (born 1941)

- Born: 1941 (age 84–85); United Kingdom
- Occupations: Writer, journalist
- Writing career
- Language: English
- Genres: Romance, mystery, detective fiction
- Subjects: Writing, journalism
- Notable works: Jordan Lacey series Casey Jones Cruise Ship Mystery series
- Notable awards: Member of the Order of the British Empire (MBE), 2001

Stella Whitelaw (born 1941) is a British writer and journalist who has published 58 novels alongside over 400 short stories in national women's magazines. She began her writing career as a cub reporter and rose to become the first female chief reporter in London. Her writing career, which spans over half a century, includes romance, cat stories, detective fiction, mystery, writing skills, and human nature.

She was the Secretary of the Parliamentary Press Gallery at the House of Commons for almost 4 decades and worked with 11 United Kingdom prime ministers. She had first hand experience of the Airey Neave bombing. She lives in Surrey.

She was awarded an MBE in 2001 for services to journalism. She won the Art of Writing competition in the London Magazine, judged by Sheridan Morley and the Elizabeth Goudge Cup at Guildford University.

She has lectured globally on many literary subjects. Her lecture Behind the Scenes at the Houses of Commons covers 37 years of UK politics with subjects such as former UK prime minister Margaret Thatcher's teeth.

== Works ==
- Weave a Loving Web (1971)
- Love is a Star Garden (1974)
- Another Word for Love (1977)
- Sweet Chastity (1979)
- Grimalkin's Tales: Strange and Wonderful Cat Stories (1983)
- Desert Storm (1983)
- Secret Taj (1984)
- Flood Tide (1986)
- Baptism of Fire (1989)
- Pennyroyal (1989)
- This Savage Sky (1990)
- Eagle's Eye (1990)
- Dragon Lady (1991)
- The Owl and the Pussycats (1993)
- A Certain Hunger (1993)
- Deluge (1994)
- Cruise Doctor (1996)
- No Darker Heaven (1996)
- Sweet Seduction (1997)
- Veil of Death (2004)
- Mirror Mirror (2006)
- Midsummer Madness (2009)
- Portrait of a Murder (2011)
- The Prosecco Fortune (2015)
- Dangerous Shadows (2017)

=== Non-Fiction ===
- How to Write and Sell a Synopsis (1993)
- How to Write a Short Short Story (1996)
- How to Write Short Short Stories (1996)
- How to Write and Sell a Book Proposal (2000)
- Book Proposals: The Essential Guide (2011)

=== Series ===
==== Jordan Lacey Series ====
- Pray and Die (2000)
- Wave and Die (2001)
- Spin and Die (2002)
- Hide and Die (2003)
- Jest and Die (2004)
- Ring and Die (2005)
- Turn and Die (2007)
- Fold and Die (2009)
- Jazz and Die (2014)
- Jordan Lacey Investigates (2018)

==== Casey Jones Cruise Ship Mystery Series ====
- Second Sitting (2008)
- Dead Slow Ahead (2008)
- A Wide Berth (2010)
