= Mary Rawson =

American television producer, writer, actor and acting teacher

- Born: Mary Anne Riedel; 1942 or 1943 (age 82–83)
- Other names: Mary Sweenie
- Education: Duquesne University
- Occupations: Producer; talk show host; writer; actress
- Years active: 1974–2016
- Spouse(s): James F. Sweenie (m. 1965; div. ?); Christopher Rawson (m. 1976)
- Children: 2

Mary Rawson (née Riedel; born 1942 or 1943), also known as Mary Sweenie, is an American television producer, talk show host, writer and actress, based in Pittsburgh. She produced and hosted WQED's weekly talk show, Lyceum, for six years and portrayed Cousin Mary Owl on the Neighborhood of Make-Believe on the children's television program Mister Rogers' Neighborhood.

== Early life and career ==
Born Mary Anne Riedel, circa 1942 or '43, Rawson is the younger of two children born to Marie (née Merriman) and Donald C. Riedel, the eldest being Donald Jr. She attended Our Lady of Mercy Academy in Oakland and Duquesne University.

Beginning in 1966 and continuing throughout the 1970s, Rawson was known solely by her then married name, Mary Sweenie.

From July 1978 through December 1984, Sweenie/Rawson was producer of WQED's weekly arts program, Lyceum.

== Personal life ==
From March 1965 until, at the very least, November 22, 1967 (when, as "James F. Sweenie" and "Mary Riedel Sweenie", their names appeared amidst a plethora of alphabetically listed fellow "DISSENTING DEMOCRATS" on a petition/full-page paid political ad, published in the Pittsburgh Post-Gazette, addressed to President Lyndon B. Johnson, and demanding an end to the war in Vietnam), Mary Riedel was married to WQED staffer James F. "Jim" Sweenie. (Note: Jim Sweenie was a fellow Duquesne alum/WQED fixture, who, much like Rawson, would prove a century-spanning member—albeit, in Sweenie's case, primarily behind the camera—of Mister Rogers' ever expanding universe.)

On October 2, 1976, Mary Sweenie married fellow actor Christopher Rawson, with whom she has had a son, Christopher, and daughter, Meghan.

== Filmography ==
Year	Title	Role/Job	Episodes/ Notes
1970–2001	Mister Rogers' Neighborhood	Actress: Cousin Mary Owl,	26 episodes
1978–1983	Lyceum	Producer, host	
1982	Kennedy Center Tonight	Writer (Narration by)	Episode: "Stravinsky's 'Firebird' by Dance Theatre of Harlem"
1983	Medea	Producer	TV movie
1983	The Chemical People	Producer, co-writer	
1987	The Mighty Pawns	Producer	TV movie
1987	Norman Rockwell: An American Portrait	Producer	
1989	The House on the Waterfall	Producer, writer	
1996	A Map of Memories	Producer, writer	Half-hour documentary special, Golden Quill winner.
2009	The Road	Actress: Well Fed Woman #2	Theatrical film starring Viggo Mortensen
2013	A Resurrection	Actress: Mrs. Doyle	Theatrical film
2014	Progression	Actress: Woman at Park	Theatrical film
2020	I'm Your Woman	Actress: Dorothy	Theatrical film
2022	A League of Their Own	Actress: Sister Ida	Episode: Switch Hitter
