= Howard Richardson (playwright) =

American dramatist

Howard Dixon Richardson (December 2, 1917 – December 30, 1984) was an American playwright, best known for the 1945 play Dark of the Moon.

Born in Spartanburg, South Carolina, Richardson graduated in 1938 from the University of North Carolina and then traveled through Europe (1938–39), returning to the University of North Carolina in 1940 for his M.A. From 1940 to 1942, he studied at the University of Iowa, where he wrote the play Barbara Allen (published in 1942), a.k.a. Night Song, inspired by the Scottish-English folk song, "The Ballad of Barbara Allen". He served with the Army in 1943.

== Broadway ==
Richardson wrote Dark of the Moon with his cousin and frequent collaborator, William Berney. They were unsuccessful in an effort to get Dark of the Moon on Broadway until an article about a Boston production of Dark of the Moon in the September 11, 1944 issue of Life attracted the attention of Broadway producers. With Richard Hart and Carol Stone heading the cast, Dark of the Moon opened on Broadway March 14, 1945 and ran for 318 performances. In addition to two off-Broadway revivals, it became a perennial play with numerous college and high school productions in the decades that followed.

Richardson's other plays include Design for a Stained Glass Window, about religious persecution, and Protective Custody, which had a short-lived 1956 New York production starring Faye Emerson.

== Television ==
Richardson also wrote for television, including Ark of Safety for the Goodyear Television Playhouse. Dark of the Moon had three television productions—on the Goodyear Television Playhouse, Cameo Theatre and Matinee Theater.

In 1960, Richardson completed his doctorate at the University of Iowa and returned to Manhattan, where he lived at 207 Columbus Avenue. He was a lecturer and resident artist at various colleges around the country.

At age 67, he died at New York's Roosevelt Hospital in 1984.
