= Christopher Rawson =

American theater critic

- Born: Christopher Comstock Hart; August 3, 1941 (age 85); Providence, Rhode Island
- Education: Deerfield Academy; Harvard University; University of Washington
- Occupation: Writer
- Spouse(s): Mary Rawson (m. 1976)
- Children: 4
- Relatives: Richard Hart
- Writing career
- Genre: theater critic

Christopher Comstock Hart Rawson (born August 3, 1941) is an American writer, university teacher and theater critic.

== Formative years ==
Born in Providence, Rhode Island, on August 3, 1941, Rawson is the first-born child of noted stage and film actor Richard Hart. His parents divorced shortly after he was born, and he was adopted by his stepfather, Jonathan Rawson.

== Career ==
Rawson's main discipline is as a theater critic. From 1983 to 2009 he was full-time theater critic and theater editor at the Pittsburgh Post-Gazette, covering theater not just in Pittsburgh but also irregularly in New York, London and the Canadian theater festivals. In 1984, he started the annual Post-Gazette (Pittsburgh) Performer of the Year Award, now (2024) in its 41st year. In 2009, he semi-retired, continuing as that paper's part-time senior theater critic. He also appeared as the critic for KDKA-TV, WQED (TV) and WQED-FM. Mr. Rawson attended Deerfield Academy. His B.A. is from Harvard University and his M.A. and Ph.D. from the University of Washington at Seattle.

Rawson is active in several theater organizations. He has been a board member since the early 1990s of the American Theatre Hall of Fame, for which, succeeding Henry Hewes (critic), he supervises the annual nominations and balloting for the selection of new inductees. He has long been active in the American Theatre Critics Association (ATCA), which he has twice served as chair (1991–93 and 2007–11) and for which he has organized conferences in London, at Connecticut's O'Neill Theater Center, at Canada's Shaw and Stratford Festivals and at the Oregon Shakespeare Festival. In 2019 he was named ATCA Historian and he continues to chronicle its history through its website at www.americantheatrecritics.org. He was also a founding member of the ATCA Foundation and continues on its Board. For some years he was on the editorial board of Best Plays, the standard theater yearbook established in 1920 by Burns Mantle.

From 1968, and as Emeritus since 2018, Rawson was a member of the English faculty at the University of Pittsburgh, where he taught courses primarily in satire, Shakespeare, critical writing, Irish drama, and the work of playwright August Wilson. He came to know Wilson and his plays well through covering him since 1984 for the playwright's hometown newspaper of record. In 1999, when the eighth play ("King Hedley II") in what would become a 10-play cycle had its world premiere, in his Dec. 15 column in the Pittsburgh Post-Gazette, he was the first to name it the "Pittsburgh Cycle". Since then, the August Wilson Estate has named it the American Century Cycle, and both names are now used. Rawson is on the Board of Trustees (as secretary) and serves as program chair of the Daisy Wilson Artist Community, named for Wilson's mother, which has restored August Wilson House at 1727 Bedford Ave. in Pittsburgh's Hill District, where Wilson lived his first 13 years and where his cycle of 10 plays can be said to have begun.

From 2001-2020 Rawson produced Off the Record, an annual musical theater satire of Pittsburgh news and newsmakers which raises funds for the Greater Pittsburgh Community Food Bank and other charities. In 1999, he wrote Where Stone Walls Meet the Sea, a 600-page centennial history of the Donald Ross-designed Sakonnet Golf Club in Little Compton, Rhode Island and of the summer colony of which it is a part. He and Laurence A. Glasco have written August Wilson: Pittsburgh Places in His Life and Plays (Pittsburgh History & Landmarks Foundation, 2nd edition, 2015) and their larger work, August Wilson's Pittsburgh, is expected soon, to be published by the University of Pittsburgh Press.

== Personal life ==
In the November 18, 1989 issue of the Pittsburgh Post-Gazette, Rawson characterizes himself as "enthusiastic, exhausted, and Unitarian", and on at least a handful of Sunday services during the prior two decades, he had addressed the congregations of Unitarian Universalist churches in the Greater Pittsburgh metropolitan area.

On October 2, 1976, Rawson married Pittsburgh television producer Mary Sweenie (née Riedel), by which name she continued to be credited prior to 1980. Since then, she has become much better known as Mary Rawson. The Rawsons have four children, a son and three daughters.
