= Richard Hart (actor) =

American actor (1915–1951)

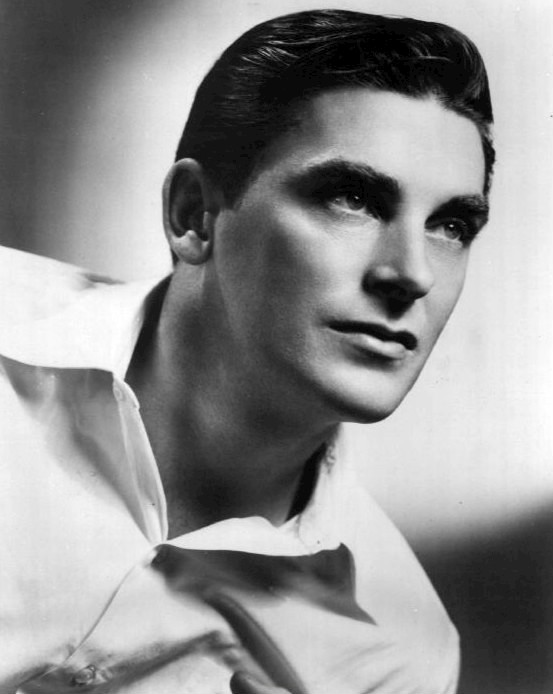
- Hart in 1949
- Born: Richard Comstock Hart; April 14, 1915; Providence, Rhode Island, U.S.
- Died: January 2, 1951 (aged 35); French Hospital, New York City, U.S.
- Resting place: Swan Point Cemetery, Providence, Rhode Island, U.S.
- Occupation: Actor
- Years active: 1943–1951
- Spouses: Eugenia Getchell (m. 1938; div. 1942); Louise Valery (m. 1945)
- Partners: Phyllis Eileen Buswell; Felicia Montealegre (1947-his death)
- Children: 4, including Christopher Rawson

Richard Comstock Hart (April 14, 1915 – January 2, 1951) was an American actor, who appeared in film and TV productions, but was most active on stage.

== Biography ==
=== Early years ===
Born in Providence, Rhode Island, Hart was the son and grandson of Henry Clay Hart and Richard Borden Comstock, leading Rhode Island lawyers. He went to Moses Brown School and Brown University, where he was an all-American soccer player. Richard's brother Henry became the husband of Leatrice Gilbert, daughter of the Hollywood stars John Gilbert and Leatrice Joy.

=== Early acting career ===
Hart first worked as a journalist and at the Gorham Silver Company before becoming seriously interested in acting through a summer theater in Tiverton, Rhode Island. He was holidaying in the town and heard they needed a male juvenile. He got the job and decided to become an actor.

Early in his career, "Hart earned as he learned by appearing in radio soap operas."

Hart gained early experience with the Providence Players. He appeared opposite Constance Bennett in a production of Without Love. He also performed with the Shoestring Players in Rhode Island.

At Provincetown, he was in Only the Heart by Horton Foote.

=== Broadway ===
Hart went to New York to study with Tamara Daykarhanova's School for the Stage. He appeared on Broadway in Pillar to Post (1943-1944), which ran 31 performances.

Hart's big break came when, as resident juvenile in a summer theater at the Brattle Playhouse in Cambridge, Massachusetts, he played John (the witch boy), the lead role in a new play trying out there, Dark of the Moon. The Shuberts took it to Broadway (1945), keeping few of the original company except Carol Stone (who played Barbara Allen) and Hart, who went on to win a Theatre World Award for his debut. A Broadway run of 318 performances then led to a national tour and a contract for Hart with Metro-Goldwyn-Mayer (MGM).

=== At MGM ===
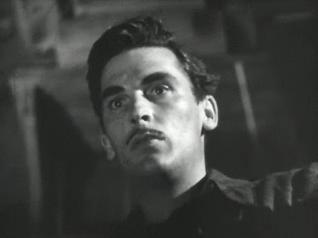
Hart in Desire Me (1947)

Hart made his film debut in Desire Me (1947), where he appeared alongside Greer Garson and Robert Mitchum. Hart replaced Robert Montgomery in his role after that actor quarreled with George Cukor. The movie had a troublesome production; after poor previews almost half of it was reshot.

Between the original film and the reshoots, Hart appeared in Green Dolphin Street (1947), where he was loved by two sisters, played by Lana Turner and Donna Reed.

Hart's third film for MGM was B.F.'s Daughter (1948), as the jilted first love of the title character, played by Barbara Stanwyck. He went over to Eagle-Lion Films to appear in Reign of Terror (1949), a Walter Wanger production set during the French Revolution directed by Anthony Mann.

=== Return to Broadway ===
Hart left MGM to go back to the stage. Back on Broadwa,y he appeared in a flop, Leaf and Bough (1949) (co-starring Charlton Heston), then in April 1949, took over for Sam Wanamaker in Goodbye, My Fancy (1948-1949), which ran for 446 performances in all.

Hart had a hit as the original Uncle Desmonde in The Happy Time (1950-1951) opposite Claude Dauphin and Eva Gabor, which ran 614 performances. Hart had to leave the show during its run because of his TV commitments.

=== Television ===
While acting on Broadway, Hart was busy in television. He appeared in episodes of The Philco-Goodyear Television Playhouse ("Dark of the Moon"), The Clock ("Expert Opinion"), Fireside Theatre ("Heartbeat/Mardi Gras"), The Ford Theatre Hour ("Outward Bound", "She Loves Me Not"), The Silver Theatre ("Star over Bridgeport"), Masterpiece Playhouse, ("Hedda Gabler"), Studio One in Hollywood ("Redemption", an adaptation of Julius Caesar, "Kyra Zelas", "The Light That Failed", and "The Passionate Pilgrim").

In October 1950, Hart began playing Ellery Queen in the DuMont Television Network series The Adventures of Ellery Queen — the first to do so on TV. Lee Bowman took over the role when Hart died.

== Personal life ==
In 1938, Hart married his teenaged sweetheart, Eugenia Getchell; they had one son, Christopher, now Christopher Rawson. Hart's desire to work in New York City led to a divorce from his wife, who chose to stay in Providence with Christopher in 1942. Hart later married actress Louise Valery, whom he had met in Dark of the Moon; they had two daughters, Hillary and Sheila.

While Hart was estranged from Louise, "reportedly, in 1947, a son, Richard Lee Hart, was born out of wedlock with Phyllis Eileen Buswell." He reportedly lived with actress Felicia Montealegre during the last four years of his life. He was portrayed as her boyfriend in the 2023 film Maestro.

== Death ==
Hart died at French Hospital of a coronary occlusion on January 2, 1951. He was 35 years old.

== Filmography ==
Year	Title	Role	Notes
1947	Green Dolphin Street	William Ozanne	
1947	Desire Me	Jean Renaud	
1948	B.F.'s Daughter	Robert S. Tasmin III	
1949	Reign of Terror	François Barras	
