= Green Dolphin Street (novel) =

1944 novel by Elizabeth Goudge

Green Dolphin Street or Green Dolphin Country
- First edition (UK) with original name
- Author: Elizabeth Goudge
- Original title: Green Dolphin Street
- Cover artist: Martin Sale
- Language: English
- Publisher: Hodder & Stoughton (UK); Coward-McCann (US)
- Publication date: 1944
- Publication place: United Kingdom

Green Dolphin Street is a novel by Elizabeth Goudge, first published by Hodder & Stoughton under the title Green Dolphin Country in 1944. The novel was adapted to a 1947 film. The novel won a $125,000 prize offered by Louis B. Mayer for a novel suitable for filming.

== Plot summary ==
In the 19th century in the Channel Islands, the sisters Marianne and Marguerite fall in love with the same man, William Ozanne. He emigrates to New Zealand, and writes home asking the one he loves to join him and become his wife, but by a slip of the pen he names the wrong sister. When Marianne arrives instead of his beloved Marguerite, he accepts the inevitable and strives to make their marriage a success. After many years, William and Marianne return to the Channel Islands.
