= Dark of the Moon (play) =

Stage play by Howard Richardson and William Berney

Dark of the Moon is a dramatic stage play by Howard Richardson and William Berney. The play was produced on Broadway in 1945 and was the maiden production of the now acclaimed New York Circle in the Square Theatre in 1951.

This was followed by a national tour and eventually numerous college and high-school productions. It is also revived professionally, e.g. by Pittsburgh's Quantum Theatre in 2005. The original London production (1948–1949), at the Lyric Hammersmith Theatre and Ambassadors Theatre, was an early much admired production by the distinguished director Peter Brook.

Set in the Appalachian Mountains and written in an Appalachian dialect, the play centers on the character of John, a witch boy who seeks to become human after falling in love with a human girl, Barbara Allen. Originally written by Howard Richardson in 1939 as a dramatization of the centuries-old European folk song "The Ballad of Barbara Allen", it was first performed at the University of Iowa in 1942 under the title Barbara Allen.

After a rewrite by Richardson's cousin, William Berney, it was presented at the Brattle Playhouse in Cambridge, Massachusetts. The Shuberts saw it and transferred it (along with the leads, Richard Hart as the Witch Boy and Carol Stone as Barbara Allen, but mainly re-cast) to Broadway at the Richard Rodgers Theatre (named at the time the 46th Street Theatre), where it ran from March 14, 1945 to December 15, 1945, directed by Robert E. Perry.

The New York Times reviewed a 1991 "rare revival" in New Jersey, referring to the many high school and college productions, but rare professional attempts.

Although Dark of the Moon is not a musical, it was originally billed as a "legend with music" and characters do sing in most productions. Paul Newman and Richard Hart both played the role of John. A musical version was staged at the Rubicon Theatre in 2023, with the book written by Jonathan Prince. Dark of the Moon is also featured as the 'play within a play' in Stranger Things: The First Shadow which opened in the West End in 2023.

== Characters and story ==
This perennial favorite is based on the haunting folk ballad of "Barbara Allen." Employing a large cast and imaginative settings in the Smoky Mountains, it recounts the story of John, a strange "witch boy" who upon first beholding the beautiful Barbara Allen immediately falls in love. He is given human form to woo and marry her on the condition that she remain true to him. The marriage is consummated and Barbara gives birth to a witch child whom the townspeople destroy in a superstitious frenzy. During a religious revival Barbara is forced to betray John thus breaking their spell of love. As she dies, he returns forever to the world of the mountain witches.

== Characters ==
Principals:

- John: a witch boy turned human, in love with Barbara Allen
- Barbara Allen: a beautiful, lusty mortal girl who falls in love with John

Supporting (in order of appearance):

- Conjur Man
- Dark Witch
- Fair Witch
- Conjur Woman
- Miss Metcalf
- Uncle Smelicue
- The Smeli Beard
- Floyd Allen
- Marvin Hudgens
- Mrs. Allen
- Mr. Allen
- Preacher Haggler
- Mr. Summey
- Mrs. Summey
- Miss Atkins
- Hank Guder
- Edna Summey
- Burt Dinwitty
- Greeny Gorman
- Hattie Heffner
- Mrs. Bergen
- Mr. Bergen
- Ella Bergen
- Miss Jenkins

== "The Ballad of Barbara Allen" ==
A witch boy from the mountain came,
A-pinin' to be human,
Fer he had seen the fairest gal...
A gal named Barbara Allen.

O Conjur Man, O Conjur Man,
Please do this thing I'm wantin'
Please change me to a human man,
Fer Barbara I'll be courtin'.

Now Barbara had a red, red dress,
And one she had of blue,
And many men did Barbara love,
But never was she true.

Oh, you can be a man, a man,
If Barbara will not grieve you,
If she be faithful fer a year,
Yer Eagle, he will leave you.

O Barbara will you marry me,
And will you leave me never,
Oh yes, my love, I'll marry you,
And live with you forever.

Three other alternate verses were used in the 1953 production of "Dark of the Moon" at the Totem Pole Playhouse:

I'll sing a song from down our way
From the mountains where I'm dwellin'
'bout a witch boy almost got a soul
Fer the love of Barbry Allen

Was in the merry month of May
The greenbuds they was swellin'
A witch boy saw a mountain gal
And wished that he was human.

Oh can you hear, how loud and clear
The church bells are a-ringin'
The valley folk from round about
Have come to git religion.

Through no doin' of her own,
Poor Barbara was unfaithful,
She lost her life on the mountain high,
And ne'er no more was witch boy human.

They laid poor Barbra by the old church gate,
With the wild, wild rose growin' nigh her,
And witch boy roamed the mountain high,
'Til mountain fog became him.

And then one morn, before the dawn,
The fog rolled down that mountain,
It came to rest nigh Barbara's rose,
and watered there a briar.

The rose and briar climbed the old church gate,
'Til they could grow no higher,
And there they tied in a true love's knot,
The rose wrapped 'round the briar.

And so a witch and human gal,
Had conquered death eternal,
And 'neath the darkness of the moon,
Their love's entwined forever.

== Other songs in the show ==
- "Down in the Valley", sung by Floyd Allen.
- "Give Me That Old Time Religion" and "Lonesome Valley", sung at the church.
- "Omie Wise", sung in the General Store

== Reactions ==
Dark of the Moon is a controversial drama and is not recommended for young children. It challenges an audience's comfort level regarding ideas of tolerance, justice, and pressures from diametrically opposed worlds.

In the late 1990s, the town of Honey Grove, Texas launched a campaign to halt the production at the local high school, citing protection of the underage against inappropriate and lewd material. The campaign extended to the Texas UIL One Act Play State Meet where there were two productions of Dark of the Moon, with one of the plays placing third at the 1998 State Meet.

At Carleton College, Northfield, Minnesota, the theater group, Players, performed the play in 1963. Folk music was popular at the time and some campus "folkies" replaced the old musical numbers in the play with current favorites. The play was a great success. The production was directed by John R ("Jack") Woodruff and featured Carleton students Erica Rosenfeld, Jim Ekberg, and Jack Turner.
