= Elizabeth Goudge =

English novelist and children's writer (1900–1984)

Elizabeth Goudge FRSL
- Goudge c. 1976
- Born: Elizabeth de Beauchamp Goudge; 24 April 1900; Wells, England
- Died: 1 April 1984 (aged 83); Rotherfield Peppard, Oxfordshire
- Occupation: Writer
- Writing career
- Period: 1934–1978
- Genres: Children's literature, romance
- Notable works: The Little White Horse; Green Dolphin Country
- Notable awards: Carnegie Medal; 1945

Elizabeth de Beauchamp Goudge FRSL (24 April 1900 – 1 April 1984) was an English writer of fiction and children's books. She won the Carnegie Medal for British children's books in 1946 for The Little White Horse. Goudge was long a popular author in the UK and the US and regained attention decades later. J. K. Rowling identified The Little White Horse as one of her favourite books and one of few to have a direct influence on the Harry Potter series.

== Biography ==
=== Personal life ===
Goudge was born on 24 April 1900 in Tower House in The Liberty of the cathedral city of Wells, Somerset, where her father, Henry Leighton Goudge, was vice-principal of the Theological College. Her mother (born Ida de Beauchamp Collenette, 1874–1951) came from Guernsey, where Henry had met her while on holiday. The family moved to Ely, when he became principal of the Theological College there, and then to Christ Church, Oxford, when he was appointed Regius Professor of Divinity at the University. Elizabeth was educated at Grassendale School, Southbourne (1914–1918) and the art school of University College Reading, then an extension college of Christ Church. She went on to teach design and handicrafts in Ely and Oxford.

After Goudge's father's death in 1939, she and her mother moved to a bungalow in Marldon, Devon. They had planned a holiday there, but the outbreak of the Second World War led them to remain. A local contractor built them a bungalow in Westerland Lane, now Providence Cottage, where they lived for 12 years. Goudge set several of her books in Marldon: Smoky House (1940), The Castle on the Hill (1941), Green Dolphin Country (1944), The Little White Horse (1946) and Gentian Hill (1949). After her mother died on 4 May 1951, she moved to Oxfordshire for the last 30 years of her life, in a cottage on Peppard Common outside Henley-on-Thames, where a blue plaque was unveiled in 2008.

Elizabeth Goudge died on 1 April 1984.

=== Writing career ===
Goudge's first book, The Fairies' Baby and Other Stories (1919), failed to sell and several years passed before she wrote her first novel, Island Magic (1934), which was an immediate success. It was based on Channel Island stories, many learnt from her mother. Elizabeth had regularly visited Guernsey as a child and recalled in her autobiography The Joy of the Snow spending many summers there with her maternal grandparents and other relatives.

The Little White Horse, published by University of London Press in 1946, won Goudge the annual Carnegie Medal of the Library Association, as the year's best children's book by a British subject. It was her own favourite among her works.

Goudge was a founding member of the Romantic Novelists' Association in 1960 and later its vice-president. Retailing her point of view:

As this world becomes increasingly ugly, callous and materialistic it needs to be reminded that the old fairy stories are rooted in truth, that imagination is of value, that happy endings do, in fact, occur, and that the blue spring mist that makes an ugly street look beautiful is just as real a thing as the street itself.

— Elizabeth Goudge

=== Themes ===
Goudge's books are notably Christian in outlook, covering sacrifice, conversion, discipline, healing, and growth through suffering. Her novels, whether realistic, fantasy or historical, weave in legend and myth and reflect a spirituality and love of England that generate its appeal, whether she wrote for adults or for children.

Goudge said there were only three of her books that she loved: The Valley of Song, The Dean's Watch and The Child from the Sea, her final novel. She doubted whether The Child from the Sea was a good book. "Nevertheless I love it because its theme is forgiveness, the grace that seems to me divine above all others, and the most desperate need of all us tormented and tormenting human beings, and also because I seemed to give to it all I have to give; very little, heaven knows. And so I know I can never write another novel, for I do not think there is anything else to say."

=== Plagiarism of Goudge's work ===
Early in 1993, Cranes' Morning by Indrani Aikath-Gyaltsen was published by Penguin Books in India, the author's second novel. In the US it was published by Ballantine Books, and enthusiastically reviewed in The New York Times and The Washington Post. For the latter, Paul Kafka called it "at once achingly familiar and breathtakingly new. [The author] believes we all live in one borderless culture." In February, the Times noted "magic" and "full of humour and insight", although it conceded that the "deliberately old-fashioned" style "sometimes verges on the sentimental."

A month later, a reader from Ontario informed Hodder and Stoughton, publisher of Goudge's book The Rosemary Tree in 1956, that it had been "taken over without any acknowledgment whatsoever". Soon another reader informed a newspaper reporter and there was a scandal.

When The Rosemary Tree was first published in 1956, The New York Times Book Review criticised its "slight plot" and "sentimentally ecstatic" approach. After Aikath-Gyaltsen recast the setting to an Indian village, changing the names and switching the religion to Hindu, but often keeping the story word-for-word the same, it received better notices.

Kafka later remarked about his Post review: "There's a phrase 'aesthetic affirmative action.' If something comes from exotic parts, it's read very differently than if it's domestically grown.... Maybe Elizabeth Goudge is a writer who hasn't gotten her due."

Several months later, Indrani Aikath-Gyaltsen was dead, perhaps from suicide, but there were requests for investigation.

=== Influence ===
J. K. Rowling, the creator of Harry Potter, has recalled that The Little White Horse was her favourite book as a child. She has also identified it as one of very few with "direct influence on the Harry Potter books. The author always included details of what her characters were eating and I remember liking that. You may have noticed that I always list the food being eaten at Hogwarts."

=== Adaptations ===
Green Dolphin Country (1944) was adapted as a film under its U.S. title, Green Dolphin Street, and the movie won the Academy Award for Special Effects in 1948. (The special effects involved the depiction of a major earthquake.) The theme tune, composed by Bronisław Kaper, later became a famous jazz standard after Miles Davis recorded it in 1958.

The television mini-series Moonacre and the 2009 film The Secret of Moonacre were based on The Little White Horse.

== Awards and honours ==
- Metro-Goldwyn-Mayer Annual Novel Award, 1944, Green Dolphin Country.
- Fellow of the Royal Society of Literature, 1945.
- Carnegie Medal, 1946, The Little White Horse.

== Bibliography ==
=== The Torminster Saga ===
- A City of Bells (1936)
- Sister of the Angels (1939)
- Henrietta's House (1942) aka The Blue Hills

=== The Eliots of Damerosehay Saga ===
- The Bird in the Tree (1940)
- The Herb of Grace (1948) aka Pilgrim's Inn
- The Heart of the Family (1953)
- The Eliots of Damerosehay (omnibus) (1957)

=== Single novels ===
- Island Magic (1934)
- The Middle Window (1935)
- Towers in the Mist (1938)
- The Castle on the Hill (1942)
- Green Dolphin Country (1944); U.S. title, Green Dolphin Street—historical novel adapted as the Hollywood movie Green Dolphin Street
- Gentian Hill (1949)
- The Rosemary Tree (1956)
- The White Witch (1958)
- The Dean's Watch (1960)
- The Scent of Water (1963)
- The Child From the Sea (1970)

=== Children's books ===
- Smoky-House (1940: illustrated by C. Walter Hodges)
- The Well of the Star (1941: USA illustrated by Gloria Kamen)
- Henrietta's House (1942: illustrated by L.R. Steele: 1968 edition illustrated by Antony Maitland: The Blue Hills in USA, illustrated by Aldren A. Watson)
- The Little White Horse (1946: illustrated by C. Walter Hodges) (Illustrated by Anne Yvonne Gilbert in 1992)
- Make-Believe (1949: illustrated by C. Walter Hodges: a sequel to Island Magic)
- The Valley of Song (1951: UK illustrated by Steven Spurrier: USA illustrated by Richard Floethe)
- Linnets and Valerians (1964: illustrated by Ian Ribbons) aka The Runaways (Illustrated by Anne Yvonne Gilbert in 1992)
- I Saw Three Ships (1969: illustrated by Richard Kennedy)

=== Collections ===
- The Fairies' Baby: And Other Stories (1919)
- A Pedlar's Pack: And Other Stories (1937)
- Three Plays: Suomi, The Brontës of Haworth, Fanny Burney (1939)
- The Golden Skylark: And Other Stories (1941)
- The Ikon on the Wall: And Other Stories (1943)
- The Elizabeth Goudge Reader (1946)
- Songs and Verses (1947)
- At the Sign of the Dolphin (1947)
- The Reward of Faith: And Other Stories (1950)
- White Wings: Collected Short Stories (1952)
- Three Cities of Bells (omnibus) (1965)
- The Ten Gifts: An Elizabeth Goudge Anthology (1965)
- A Christmas Book: An Anthology of Christmas Stories (1967)
- The Lost Angel: Stories (1971)
- Hampshire Trilogy (omnibus) (1976)
- Pattern of People: An Elizabeth Goudge Anthology (1978)

=== Nonfiction ===
- God So Loved the World: The Story of Jesus (1951)
- Saint Francis of Assisi (1959) aka My God and My All: The Life of St. Francis of Assisi
- A Diary of Prayer (1966)
- The Joy of the Snow: An Autobiography (1974)

=== Anthologies containing stories by Elizabeth Goudge ===
- Dancing with the Dark (1997)

=== Anthologies edited by Elizabeth Goudge ===
- A Book of Comfort: An Anthology (1964)
- A Book of Peace: An Anthology (1967)
- A Book of Faith: An Anthology (1976)

=== Short stories ===
- ESP (1974)

== Relevant literature ==
- Gough, John. "Rediscovering" The Little White Horse"." Signal 48 (1985): 168.
- Gower, Sylvia. The World of Elizabeth Goudge. Girls Gone By Publishers, 2020.
- Isaac, Megan Lynn. "Misplaced: The Fantasies and Fortunes of Elizabeth Goudge." The Lion and the Unicorn 21, no. 1 (1997): 86-111.
- Langford, Elizabeth Edith Kearney. 2015. Healing in the Works of Elizabeth Goudge. Trinity College: MA thesis.
- Rawlins, Christine. Beyond the Snow: The Life and Faith of Elizabeth Goudge. WestBow Press, 2015.
- Rosenberg, Teya. "Genre and Ideology in Elizabeth Goudge's The Little White Horse." Children's Literature Association Quarterly 27, no. 2 (2002): 77-87.
- Warry, Michelle Joselin. Vision of community: a feminist re-reading of Elizabeth Goudge’s children’s novels. PhD diss., University of British Columbia, 2005.
