= Reign of Terror (film) =

1949 film by Anthony Mann

- Theatrical release poster
- Directed by: Anthony Mann
- Written by: Aeneas MacKenzie; Philip Yordan
- Produced by: William Cameron Menzies
- Starring: Robert Cummings; Arlene Dahl; Richard Basehart; Richard Hart; Arnold Moss; Norman Lloyd; Beulah Bondi
- Cinematography: John Alton
- Edited by: Fred Allen
- Music by: Sol Kaplan
- Production companies: Walter Wanger Productions; United Californian
- Distributed by: Eagle-Lion Films
- Release date: June 16, 1949 (New Orleans)
- Running time: 89 minutes
- Country: United States
- Language: English
- Budget: $771,623
- Box office: $692,671

Reign of Terror (reissued as The Black Book) is a 1949 American historical thriller film directed by Anthony Mann from a screenplay by Aeneas MacKenzie and Philip Yordan, and starring Robert Cummings, Richard Basehart, and Arlene Dahl. Set during the French Revolution, the film follows a plot to bring down Maximilien Robespierre and end his bloodthirsty Reign of Terror.

The film was produced by Walter Wanger Productions. Reign of Terror is noted by critics for applying film noir sensibilities to a period setting. As of 2024, the film is in the public domain in the United States.

The movie was one of Cummings' favorites of his career.

== Plot ==
The most powerful man in France, Maximilien Robespierre, wants to become the nation's dictator. He summons François Barras, the only man who can nominate him before the National Convention. Barras refuses to do so and goes into hiding.

Meanwhile, patriot Charles D'Aubigny secretly kills and impersonates Duval, the prosecutor of Strasbourg, whom Robespierre summoned to Paris for unknown purposes (which Robespierre's enemies wish to ascertain). Neither Robespierre nor Fouché, the chief of his secret police, had met Duval before, so the substitution goes undetected. Robespierre informs D'Aubigny that his black book, containing the names of those he intends to denounce and have executed, has been stolen. Robespierre's numerous foes are kept in check by not knowing whether their names are on the list or not. If they were to learn for certain that they are on the list, they would band together against him. He gives D'Aubigny authority over everyone in France and 24 hours to retrieve the book.

D'Aubigny meets Barras through his sole contact, Madelon, whom D'Aubigny once loved. However, he was followed, and the police, led by Saint-Just, arrest Barras. Despite being in an uncomfortable position, D'Aubigny manages to allay both sides' suspicions that he has betrayed them.

Visiting Barras in prison, he informs him that three of his men have been murdered. Strangely, their rooms have not been ransacked in search of the book, leading D'Aubigny to surmise that it was never stolen in the first place, and that Robespierre is using the alleged theft to distract his foes. Saint-Just, still suspicious, sends for Duval's wife to identify her husband. Pretending to be Madame Duval, Madelon extricates D'Aubigny, while the real Madame Duval awaits at the gate.

Before news of his impersonation spreads, D'Aubigny returns to Robespierre's private office—located in the back rooms of a bakery—to look for the book. There, he encounters Fouché. When D'Aubigny finds the book, Fouché tries to stab him. D'Aubigny strangles him into unconsciousness and escapes. Madelon and he hide out at the farmhouse of fellow conspirators, the Blanchards, who are either under arrest in Paris or already dead at the hands of Saint-Just's sergeant. Saint-Just goes to the Blanchards' farm and gets no help from anyone there. D'Aubigny and Madelon flee on horseback, and a chase ensues. D'Aubigny gets away, but Madelon is caught and taken back to Paris. Despite being tortured by the sergeant, she refuses to talk.

The convention is assembled and about to convene. Fouché shows up and shows an earring of Madelon's to D'Aubigny. Without the book, many more will die; dissolve to the convention. Fouché tips his hat to Robespierre, but Barras sees a book being passed from hand to hand among the delegates, while Robespierre denounces Barras in a speech. Meanwhile, D'Aubigny searches Robespierre's office, and the sergeant takes her to a hidden room. Robespierre concludes his speech and is shocked to find himself denounced and pursued by the mob. He is followed to his office and nearly brings them to heel with his golden words. However, Fouché orders a man to shoot Robespierre through the jaw, silencing him forever. This makes learning where Madelon is located impossible for a desperate D'Aubigny. Robespierre is taken to the guillotine.

D'Aubigny returns to Robespierre's office and tears it apart. In despair, he tosses his torch to the floor in front of a bookcase, planning to burn everything. The torch reveals a stain on the floor that leads him to the secret room. He kills the sergeant and rescues Madelon.

Outside the bakery, Fouché starts talking with an army officer as the crowd celebrates the death of Robespierre. Fouché, about to take leave of the officer, asks his name. The man replies, "Bonaparte. Napoleon Bonaparte." Fouché, unimpressed, still promises to remember the name.

== Cast ==
The cast list includes:

- Robert Cummings as Charles D'Aubigny
- Richard Basehart as Maximilien Robespierre
- Richard Hart as François Barras
- Arlene Dahl as Madelon
- Arnold Moss as Fouché
- Norman Lloyd as Tallien
- Charles McGraw as Sergeant
- Beulah Bondi as Grandma Blanchard
- Jess Barker as Louis Antoine de Saint-Just
- Wade Crosby as Danton
- Russ Tamblyn as Pierre's oldest son

== Production ==
In August 1948, Wanger signed a deal with Cummings to star in the film. To get him, the movie became a co-production with Cummings' own company, United Californian. Arlene Dahl was borrowed from MGM.

Producer Walter Wanger, director Anthony Mann, cinematographer John Alton, and production designer William Cameron Menzies used their combined talents to make a low-budget "epic" using Broadway stars and shooting on sets only costing $40,000.

It was the first collaboration between Mann and Philip Yordan, who said the original script by Aeneas MacKenzie was "nothing but speeches, Robespierre and all this." He told Mann, "you can't follow the script unless you're a student of the French Revolution", so he suggested the story be simplified to be about Cummings tracking down a book containing the names of anti-Revolutionaries before Robespierre could get it.

Filming started August 23, 1948, and ended in early October 1948 .

Mann said it was only through William Menzies' "ability that we were able to achieve any style, feeling or period" under the limited budget.

== Release ==
The film opened at the Joy Theater in New Orleans on June 16, 1949.

When it played New York later that year, it was released as The Black Book, its original working title.

== See also ==
- Public domain film
- List of American films of 1949
- List of films in the public domain in the United States
