= B.F.'s Daughter =

1948 film by Robert Zigler Leonard

- Directed by: Robert Z. Leonard
- Written by: Luther Davis
- Based on: B.F.'s Daughter by John P. Marquand
- Produced by: Edwin H. Knopf
- Starring: Barbara Stanwyck; Van Heflin
- Cinematography: Joseph Ruttenberg
- Edited by: George White
- Music by: Bronislau Kaper; Clifford Vaughan
- Distributed by: Metro-Goldwyn-Mayer
- Release date: April 2, 1948 (United States)
- Running time: 108 minutes
- Country: United States
- Language: English
- Budget: $1,745,000
- Box office: $1,910,000

B.F.'s Daughter is a 1948 American drama film directed by Robert Z. Leonard and starring Barbara Stanwyck and Van Heflin. It was adapted by Luther Davis from John P. Marquand's 1946 novel of the same name, about a prominent couple whose marital tensions come to a boiling point during World War II. The book was controversial for its treatment of social conflicts and adultery, but the film is a sanitized and fairly conventional love story.

The film was released in the UK as Polly Fulton, because "B.F." was a euphemism there for "bloody fool" in the 1940s.

== Plot ==
Polly Fulton is the only daughter of rich industrialist B.F. Fulton. She is involved in a long engagement to family friend Bob Tasmin, an affable, scrupulously honest lawyer who is such a steady guy that he sometimes seems boring. Then she meets brash intellectual Tom Brett, who blames many of the world's problems on the rich. Tom and Polly heartily dislike each other at first, but she finds him exciting compared to the well-meaning "stuffed shirt" Bob. Soon Tom and Polly fall passionately in love and get married.

Tom has a tense relationship with Polly's family from the start. When he gradually realizes that his in-laws are using their connections to advance his career, he is not grateful but bitter. Polly is painfully torn between her strong-willed husband and her devoted father, whom everyone calls "B.F."

When World War II arrives, Tom takes a high-level civilian position in Washington, doing work that he cannot discuss. He and Polly rarely see each other and begin to lead separate lives. Two wartime developments eventually bring the relationship to a crisis point. First, Polly hears a rumor that Tom is having an affair. Then she is stunned by a news report that Bob Tasmin, now a dashing military officer happily married to Polly's best friend, has apparently been killed on a mission behind enemy lines. As the truth about both situations is revealed, Polly and Tom confront their own problems and learn what they mean to each other.

== Cast ==
- Barbara Stanwyck as Pauline "Polly" Fulton Brett
- Van Heflin as Tom Brett
- Charles Coburn as Burton F. "B.F." Fulton
- Richard Hart as Robert S. "Bob" Tasmin III
- Keenan Wynn as Martin Delwyn "Marty" Ainsley
- Margaret Lindsay as "Apples" Sandler
- Marshall Thompson as the sailor
- Spring Byington as Gladys Fulton
- Barbara Laage as Euginia Taris
- Thomas E. Breen as Maj. Isaac Riley
- Edwin Cooper as Maj. Gen. Waldron
- Fred Nurney as Jan, the butler
- Pierre Watkin as Joe Stewart, Brett's boss (uncredited)

== Reception ==
=== Box office ===
The film earned $1,449,000 in the US and Canada and $461,000 elsewhere, recording a loss of $565,000.

=== Critical ===
Variety wrote: "It carries femme interest and has other recommendations to point it for geod returns. The polished production supervision has been carefully handled by Edwin H. Knopf to give it the expected Metro gloss, and performances are of top calibre. Script, however, makes an even more shallow exploration of the passing of a colorful era than did the John P. Marquand novel on which it is based. It's a boy meets girl story, backgrounded against the period from the early '30s into the war years. To catch the distaff eye, Barbara Stanwyck has been stunningly gowned and beautifully photographed. The art direction and set decorations add to elaborateness of production."

The Monthly Film Bulletin wrote: "Apart from a surprisingly banal ending this film will be enjoyed by most people. Barbara Stanwyck and Van Heflin are adequate as the two young lovers who cannot understand each other, but Charles Coburn's study of the shrewd yet kind-hearted millionaire father overshadows the rest of the cast."

Boxoffice wrote: "Best-selling literature has been the source of a goodly percentage of the more noteworthy features emanating from mighty Leo during recent months (Green Dolphin Street, Cass Timberlane). The filmization of J. P. Marquand's provocative novel has all the requisites to join and add grace to that growing parade. Furthermore, it rates such distinguished company as concerns both its productional merits and its profit potentialities. Performances are as thoroughly ingratiating and convincing as patrons will expect from the carefully-selected, star-festooned cast ... Also rating a passing plaudit is the adroit, offensive-to-none manner in which the film handles the sociological problems. A solid credit for Producer Edwin Knopf, the stars and Director Robert Z. Leonard."

== Radio adaptation ==
On December 11, 1950, Lux Radio Theater broadcast a radio adaptation of B.F.'s Daughter with Barbara Stanwyck reprising her role in the film.
