= Desire Me =

1947 American film with no credited director

- Theatrical release poster
- Directed by: Jack Conway (uncredited); George Cukor (uncredited); Mervyn Le Roy (uncredited); Victor Saville (uncredited)
- Screenplay by: Marguerite Roberts; Zoe Akins; Casey Robinson
- Based on: Karl and Anna by Leonhard Frank
- Produced by: Arthur Hornblow Jr.
- Starring: Greer Garson; Robert Mitchum; Richard Hart
- Cinematography: Joseph Ruttenberg
- Edited by: Joseph Dervin
- Music by: Herbert Stothart (uncredited)
- Production company: Metro-Goldwyn-Mayer
- Distributed by: Loew's Inc.
- Release date: October 31, 1947
- Running time: 91 minutes
- Country: United States
- Language: English
- Budget: $4,149,000
- Box office: $2,576,000

Desire Me is a 1947 American romantic drama film starring Greer Garson and Robert Mitchum. It had a troubled production that included numerous directors and rewrites, and was released without a credited director.

== Plot ==
In Paris, Marise Aubert is discussing her medical condition with Dr. Leclair, who explains that there is nothing physically wrong with her and that her pain is the result of her internal struggles.

In a flashback to two weeks earlier, soldier Jean Renaud arrives suddenly at Marise's cottage. He explains that he was in a Nazi reprisal camp with Marise's husband Paul, who told him everything about her. He tells her that he saw Paul shot dead. She tells him to leave but relents because of a storm and allows him to stay.

Marise is shocked that Jean knows practically everything about her because of what Paul had told him in the camp. Jean has fallen in love with her from these stories, but when he makes romantic advances, Marise orders him to leave. She changes her mind because she is lonely and Jean is from Paul's life. They spend some happy times together.

A letter from Paul arrives, but Jean intercepts it before Marise can see it. The letter explains that Paul is not dead and that he is about to be released from a hospital so he can return to her. Jean nearly leaves after he realizes that Paul is alive, but he stays. Marise agrees to sell Paul's business and leave with Jean, but Paul returns before they leave. Marise learns of Paul's return and rushes home. Jean learns of Paul's return and retrieves an old gun that he found in Paul's office and heads to the cottage to confront Paul.

Marise is ecstatic to have him back, but confesses her relationship with Jean. Paul confronts his friend over the betrayal and Jean brandishes a gun. They struggle, and Jean is killed in a fall from a cliff.

In the present, the doctor tells Marise to return home. She returns to the cottage where Paul awaits her and they reunite happily.

== Cast ==
- Greer Garson as Marise
- Robert Mitchum as Paul
- Richard Hart as Jean
- Cecil Humphreys as Dr. Leclair
- George Zucco as Father Donnard

== Production ==
Garson injured her back while filming Desire Me in Monterey on April 26, 1946, when a wave knocked her and co-star Richard Hart from the rocks where they were rehearsing. A local fisherman and extra in the film rescued Garson from the surf and potential undertow. She was bruised and in shock and required by doctors to rest for several days. The injury to her back would require several surgeries over the coming years.

== Reception ==
The film earned $1,451,000 in the US & Canada and earned $1,125,000 elsewhere, but because of its high production cost, producers suffered a net loss of $2,440,000.

The Canadian filmmaker Guy Maddin cast a vote for Desire Me on his top-ten ballot for the Sight and Sound Greatest Films of All Time 2022 directors' poll.
