= Green Dolphin Street (film) =

1947 film by Victor Saville

- Directed by: Victor Saville
- Screenplay by: Samson Raphaelson; Carey Wilson (uncredited)
- Based on: Green Dolphin Street; 1944 novel by Elizabeth Goudge
- Produced by: Carey Wilson
- Starring: Lana Turner; Van Heflin; Donna Reed; Richard Hart
- Cinematography: George J. Folsey
- Edited by: George White
- Music by: Bronislaw Kaper
- Production company: Metro-Goldwyn-Mayer
- Distributed by: Loew's Inc.
- Release date: October 15, 1947 (New York City)
- Running time: 142 minutes
- Country: United States
- Language: English
- Budget: $4,391,000
- Box office: $7,173,000

Green Dolphin Street is a 1947 American historical drama disaster film directed by Victor Saville and starring Lana Turner, Van Heflin, and Donna Reed. It was produced by Carey Wilson. Based on the 1944 novel Green Dolphin Street by Elizabeth Goudge, it was released by Metro-Goldwyn-Mayer.

== Plot ==
In the 1840s, in the town of San Pierre on the English Channel Island of Guernsey, two sisters, Marguerite and Marianne Patourel, daughters of the wealthy Octavius Patourel, fall in love with the same young man, William Ozanne. Marguerite is sweet and simple, while Marianne is extremely shrewd and plans to take over the family shipping business. William is the son of Dr. Edmond Ozanne, who has recently returned to the island after many years away. Additionally, Dr. Ozanne is the former teenage lover of Sophie Patourel, Marguerite and Marianne's mother. Sophie's mother broke up their youthful romance over Edmond's heavy drinking and lower social status. She married Octavius afterwards, under pressure from her parents.

Meanwhile, the new clipper ship Green Dolphin arrives in the island's port. The captain of the ship, Captain O'Hara, tells William and Marianne of the wonders of the new colony of New Zealand. Captain O'Hara's men catch a stow-away, Timothy Haslam, who recently killed his brother-in-law in self-defence. Captain O'Hara believes his story and agrees to smuggle the man to New Zealand. Marianne then schemes for her father to sponsor William to be a naval officer. After a two-year time skip, William returns to the island for a day. On the island, he secretly declares his love for Marguerite and his father dies suddenly. William reluctantly agrees to return to his ship and travels to China. In China, he sends a love letter and gift to Marguerite, but is then drugged and robbed. He misses his ship and is labeled as a deserter. Fortuitously, he finds the Green Dolphin in the Chinese port. He sneaks aboard the ship and travels to New Zealand, where he will be safe from the law. Captain O'Hara finds William work in New Zealand as a school teacher, but he chooses to travel into the back-country with Timothy instead.

Having settled in New Zealand and become a successful lumberman, William drunkenly writes a letter to the family proposing marriage to Marianne, meaning to write "Marguerite" and confusing the names. Sophie reads the letter aloud to the family. Marianne is elated and Marguerite crushed by the news, not realizing the mistake. Marianne decides, against her father's wishes, to set off on the Green Dolphin for New Zealand to be with William. As they approach New Zealand, O'Hara warns Marianne that William gave him the note in a drunken stupor and may not be serious, but she affirms that she loves William and will make a good man out of him. In New Zealand William, expecting Marguerite, realizes his mistake only when he sees Marianne come off the boat. Timothy, who secretly loved Marianne in San Pierre, strong-arms William into marrying her and not disappointing the would-be bride.

When Sophie is on her deathbed, she tells Marguerite and Octavius that her marriage was forced, but that she grew to love Octavius completely. Octavius says that he always knew, but loved her anyway and supported William because of Sophie's love for his father. Sophie tells Marguerite to apply the advice to her own life, as a hint that William was never the man for her and that she can make a better love. As Sophie dies, Marguerite leaves her mother and father alone and goes to her room. She reads a letter from William, which announces that Marianne is pregnant. She runs to tell her father, but is informed that her father died minutes after her mother. Despondent, she crosses the tidal flats to a nearby island and lies on the beach as the tide comes in. However, as the water reaches her, she regains the will to live and climbs the treacherous rocks to the nearby convent, where the nuns take pity on her.

Marianne significantly improves the lumber business by switching to barge shipping, instead of wagons. Marianne is pregnant and unhappy in her marriage, knowing that William hates her and drinks heavily, despite her love for him. While William is away on business, a terrible earthquake destroys the Maori village and logging camp. Timothy saves Marianne as fissures open and trees fall all around. A massive tsunami and landslide floods the river barge that William is on, nearly drowning him. Green Dolphin is wrecked by the tsunami and Captain O'Hara is killed, despite William's effort to save him. William and Marianne reconcile in the aftermath of the disaster and name their newborn daughter Veronica.

Several years later, war has broken out between the Maori and the New Zealand colonial government. Timothy is warned that fighting is going to spread into their area and implores Marianne and Veronica to leave for Wellington. They refuse and Marianne convinces William to build a stockade around their village, also against Timothy's advice. Timothy leaves for Wellington. The hostile Maori attack and capture the family. However, Timothy returns and negotiates their release with his friends among the Maori. Their timber business destroyed, Marianne plans to move to the South Island and start a sheep ranch. Timothy decides not to join them, but confesses his love to Marianne before she leaves. The attraction is mutual, but Marianne says she cannot leave her husband and daughter.

In San Pierre, Marguerite returns to the convent and prepares to become a nun. The move to the South Island is extremely successful for Marianne and William, who now live in a stately mansion in Dunedin. In addition to the sheep business, they have formed a steam-shipping company and William is one of the community's first citizens. However, Marianne wants to return to San Pierre and run the family business from there. She arranges a pardon for William for his crime of desertion, so that they can return. When they arrive in the family house, Marianne finds William's old letter from China confessing his love for Marguerite. Marianne confronts William, who admits his drunken mistake and that Timothy knew of it. Marianne meets Marguerite on the day she is to take her vows as a nun and explains William's mistake. Marguerite explains that she is happy as a nun and she no longer loves William. As Marguerite takes her vows, William tells Marianne that he has grown to love her more than he ever loved Marguerite. The film ends with Marguerite taking her vows as a nun.

== Cast ==
- Lana Turner as Marianne Patourel
- Van Heflin as Timothy Haslam
- Donna Reed as Marguerite Patourel
- Richard Hart as William Ozanne
- Frank Morgan as Dr. Edmond Ozanne
- Edmund Gwenn as Octavius Patourel
- Dame May Whitty as Mother Superior
- Reginald Owen as Captain O'Hara
- Gladys Cooper as Sophie Patourel
- Moyna Macgill as Mrs. Metivier
- Linda Christian as Hine-Moa
- Bernie Gozier as Jacky-Poto
- Patrick Aherne as Kapua-Manga
- Al Kikume as A Maori
- Edith Leslie as Sister Angelique
- Ramsay Ames as Corinne
- Gigi Perreau as Veronica (child)
- Lynn O'Leary-Jameson as Veronica (infant)
- Douglas Walton as Sir Charles Maloney

== Production background ==
The film stars Lana Turner, Van Heflin, Donna Reed, and Richard Hart, and features a screenplay by Samson Raphaelson based on the historical novel Green Dolphin Street (1944) by Elizabeth Goudge. The film was directed by Victor Saville and produced by Carey Wilson.

Hart and Heflin, who played romantic rivals in Green Dolphin Street, were similarly cast in B.F.'s Daughter (1948). Hart made only four feature films before his death at an early age, two of them co-starring Heflin.

== Location ==
The film was shot on location in Humboldt County, California.

== Reception ==
The film was one of the most popular movies at the British box office in 1948 and MGM's most successful film of 1947. It earned $4,304,000 in the US and Canada and $2,869,000 elsewhere, but because of its high cost only recorded a profit of $339,000.

== Awards and honors ==
In 1948, the film won the Academy Award for Best Visual Effects, particularly for its depiction of a devastating earthquake. It was also nominated in the categories Cinematography (Black-and-White), Film Editing, Sound Recording (Douglas Shearer) and Special Effects.

The film is recognized by American Film Institute in these lists:

- 2005: AFI's 100 Years of Film Scores – Nominated

== Theme song ==
The film's title song, "Green Dolphin Street" (often recorded as "On Green Dolphin Street"), went on to become a jazz standard. The song has been recorded by Bill Evans, Eric Dolphy, the Modern Jazz Quartet, Albert Ayler, Tony Bennett, Miles Davis, Ahmad Jamal, John Coltrane, Agnieszka Hekiert, Dick and Kiz Harp, Steps Ahead, Jane Fuller, and Grant Green, among others.

== Radio adaptation ==
Green Dolphin Street was presented on Lux Radio Theatre 19 September 1949. The adaptation starred Turner, Heflin, and Peter Lawford.
