= Indrani Aikath Gyaltsen =

Indian novelist and columnist

- Born: 1952; Chaibasa, Bihar, India
- Died: 1994 (aged 41–42)
- Occupation: Freelance Journalist

Indrani Aikath Gyaltsen (1952–1994) was an Indian novelist and columnist, most notable for her plagiarism of English novelist Elizabeth Goudge's 1956 novel The Rosemary Tree in her 1993 second novel, Cranes' Morning.

== Early life ==
She was born in Chaibasa, Bihar in 1952 to a local coal-mine owner and had a privileged upbringing. She was educated at Loreto Convent School – a premier Catholic School in the nearby city of Jamshedpur, before leaving India to continue her studies at Barnard College, New York City.

== Personal life ==
She was briefly married and was divorced, after which she moved to Calcutta where she was wooed by a succession of men, allegedly rejecting an Indian Army Officer because of "the Punjabi accent" of his spoken English. She ultimately remarried Sonam Gyaltsen, a tea-plantation owner of Tibetan origin and moved to an estate high above Darjeeling in the embattled north-eastern state of Assam. They had a son, later a law student.

Having failed in an attempt to become a regular columnist for the Calcutta daily The Statesman – her mentor Khushwant Singh observed she "put little effort into the reporting or the writing", and despite her begging for the editors to reconsider, the column was cancelled after only six weeks – she then ran a hotel, and authored three novels: Daughters of the House, Cranes' Morning (1993) and Hold My Hand, I'm Dying, the last being published posthumously after her suicide.

== Mentorship of Khushwant Singh ==
Indrani wrote to Khushwant Singh, a famous Indian man-of-letters, who answered her letters as he did of many aspiring young Indian writers, encouraging her. She mailed her first novel to him chapter-by-chapter, and he mentioned her to David Davidar, head of Penguin Books in India. Singh, "mystified" by the circumstances of her death, admitted "She got totally latched onto me as a mentor and guide. I exaggerated praise for her to build her into a writer of the future."

== Plagiarism scandal ==
Soon after its publication, it became clear that her second novel, Cranes' Morning, had been plagiarised from The Rosemary Tree by the English novelist Elizabeth Goudge, which had been published in London by Hodder & Stoughton in 1956. Molly Moore of the Washington Post Foreign Service wrote: "Aikath-Gyaltsen recast the setting to an Indian village, changing the names and switching the religion to Hindu but often keeping the story word-for-word the same". When the plagiarism was uncovered, Crane's Morning had been published by Penguin Books in India and Ballantine Books in the U.S. but not yet in the UK.

== Suicide ==
She died after consuming poison in 1994 not long after the plagiarism was discovered. She had come back to her deceased father's ancestral house where she was engaged in a contentious battle over his property and assets against her own mother and sister, from whom she was estranged.

Khushwant Singh wrote about her in his book Women and Men in My Life, which he dedicated to her.

== Novels ==
- Daughters of the House (1992)
- Cranes' Morning (1993)
- Hold My Hand, I'm Dying (unknown)
