= John Jonas Gruen =

American art historian

- Born: Jonas Grunberg; September 12, 1926; Enghien-les-Bains, France
- Died: July 12, 2016 (aged 89); New York City, U.S.
- Other name: John Gruen
- Spouse: Jane Wilson (m. 1948; died 2015)

John Jonas Gruen (born Jonas Grunberg; September 12, 1926 – July 12, 2016) was an American art critic, art historian, author, photographer, and composer.

== Early life and education ==
Jonas Grunberg was born Enghien-les-Bains, France, the youngest of four sons, to Abraham Grunberg who was initially a diamond dealer later became a travel writer, and Aranka Dodeles. The Jewish family moved to Berlin, Germany, in 1929; when the Nazis came to power in 1933, they fled persecution to Milan in 1933. The family once again moved in 1939 when they left for New York City to flee from Italian Fascism.

Grunberg chose the name "John Jonas Gruen" in an attempt to Americanize himself. He learned how to speak English from Hollywood films. Gruen graduated from the High School of Commerce in New York City. Initially he attended City College of New York. Then, in an effort to assimilate, he sought attendance at what he thought to be the most American school, the University of Iowa. Gruen majored in art history and earned bachelor's and master's degrees in the discipline.

== Career ==
After graduation from college, Gruen moved back to New York City where he settled in Greenwich Village.

He took jobs as a book buyer at Brentano's, a publicity director at Grove Press and a photographers' agent. Throughout his early years in New York, he aspired to be a composer and composed songs including settings of poetry by E. E. Cummings, Wallace Stevens and Rainer Maria Rilke. The songs were ultimately performed by Eleanor Steber and Patricia Neway. New Songs, a compilation of Gruen's work, was released in 1950 and was the first record issued by Elektra Records.

He became friends with composer Virgil Thomson which inspired Gruen to contribute music reviews to the New York Herald Tribune, later becoming part of its staff in addition to acting as the paper's art critic. Using his shortened name John Gruen, he later went on to write for The New York Times, as well as being appointed as the first chief art critic of the magazine New York. Later in his career with the paper, he became a dance critic as well.

As a photographer, Gruen used his full name to distinguish himself from another New York photographer named John Gruen. Gruen captured images of the creative icons in his social and professional circles including Yoko Ono, Jasper Johns, Larry Rivers, Leonard Bernstein and Willem de Kooning. Many of those photographs were later acquired by the Whitney Museum of American Art and presented in a 2010 exhibition, "Facing the Artist: Portraits by John Jonas Gruen". The Sixties: Young in the Hamptons (2006) and Two Men (2013) are a themed collections of his photographs.

== Personal life and death ==
In 1948, Gruen married painter Jane Wilson, whom he met while studying at the University of Iowa. Together they had one daughter, Julia Gruen, who became the executive director of the Keith Haring Foundation. Gruen and Wilson remained together until her death in 2015.

== Death ==
Gruen died at the age of 89 from natural causes at his home in New York City in 2016.

== Bibliography ==
Among Gruen's books are The Private World of Leonard Bernstein (1968), The Private World of Ballet (1975), Menotti: A Biography (1978), Erik Bruhn: Danseur Noble (1979), The World's Great Ballets: La Fille Mal Gardee to Davidsbundlertanze (1981), People Who Dance: 22 Dancers Tell Their Own Stories (1988), The New Bohemia: The Combine Generation (1990), and Keith Haring: The Authorized Biography (1992) (translated into Italian). He published his autobiography, Callas Kissed Me...Lenny Too!: A Critic's Memoir, in 2008.

== Discography ==
- New Songs (1951)
- Contemporary Christmas Carols (1952)
- Song Cycles Woodwind Quartets
- Songs to Texts by James Joyce
