= University of London Press =

Publishing house

- Parent company: University of London
- Status: Active
- Founded: 1910; reestablished 2019
- Country of origin: United Kingdom
- Headquarters location: London, England
- Distribution: Chicago Distribution Center; Ingram Publisher Services UK
- Publication types: Books and Journals
- Nonfiction topics: Humanities
- No. of employees: 4
- Official website: uolpress.co.uk

The University of London Press (also known as UoL Press) is a publishing house that is part of the University of London. Based in the School of Advanced Study at Senate House, it "seeks to facilitate collaborative, inclusive, open access interchange, within and beyond the academy."

== History ==
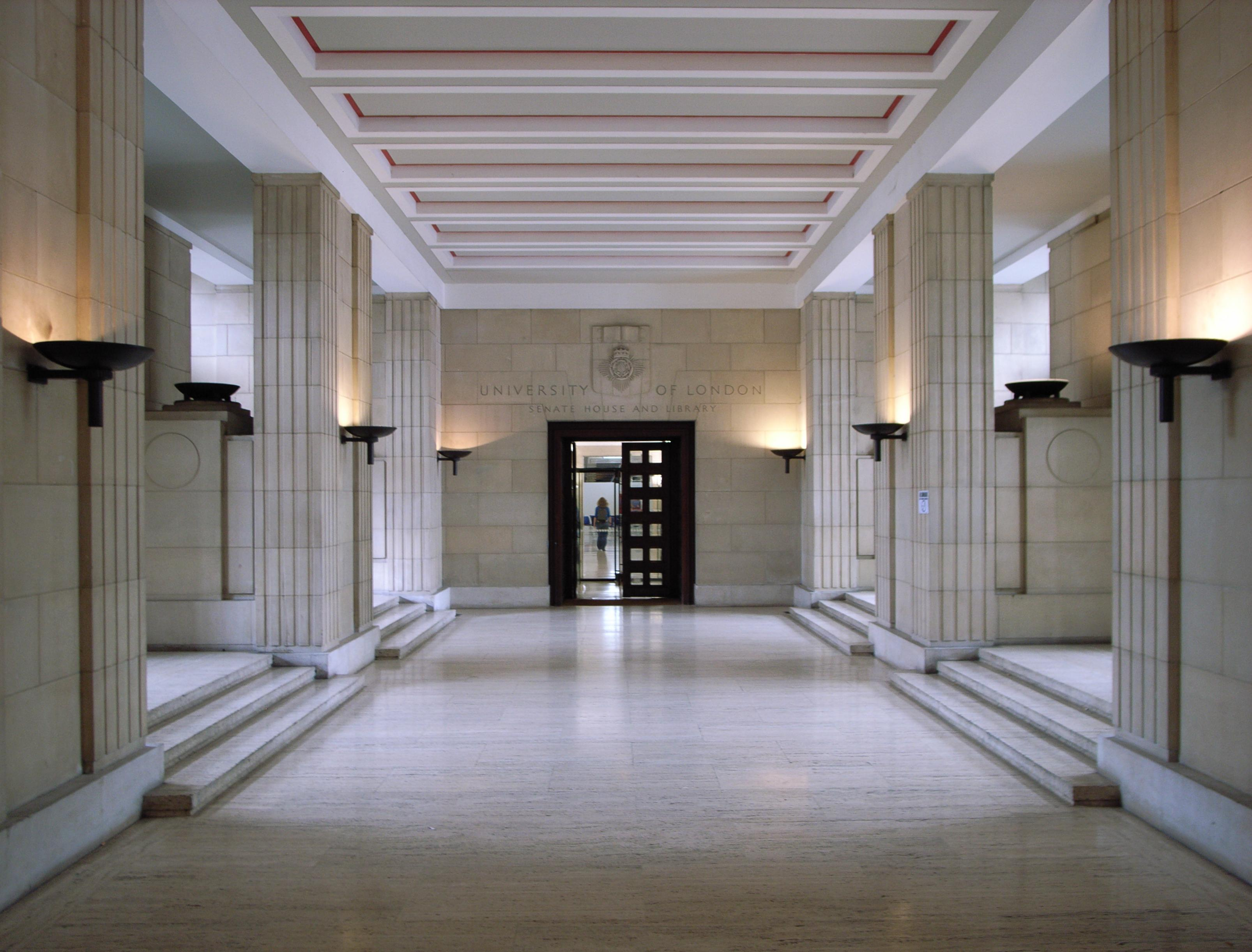
The University of London Press is located in the art-deco style Senate House in London, whose entrance hall is shown above.

The University of London Press was originally established in 1910. From 1948 to 1979, it was known as Athlone Press.

In 2019, the University of London Press was relaunched as an open access publisher, and in 2023 the Press rebranded with a new logo, website and mission, aiming to "open up humanities research".

It is a founding member of the Open Institutional Publishing Association.

== Publishing ==
The University of London Press publishes cutting-edge humanities research. They are a non-profit, predominantly open access university press and offer authors a friendly, professional and collaborative publishing experience.

They publish 20–25 books a year across the humanities disciplines, publishing work that highlights the importance of humanities research and opens up debate.

They publish with a wide range of partners who benefit from the experience and flexibility they offer in meeting the needs of specific disciplines and research institutions. The Press is an integral part of the School of Advanced Study (SAS) at the University of London, which has enabled them to forge long-lasting and productive relationships within SAS, across its international renowned humanities institutes and with leading scholars. Several of their book series are published in association with the institutes (listed below) and other scholarly associations such the Royal Historical Society, and offer important venues for new humanities research both within and across disciplines.

The University of London Press has partnerships with the following institutes of the School of Advanced Study:

- Institute of Advanced Legal Studies
- Institute of Classical Studies
- Institute of Commonwealth Studies
- Institute of English Studies
- Institute of Historical Research
- Institute of Latin American Studies
- Institute of Modern Languages Research
- Warburg Institute

== Award-winning books ==
- Becoming a Historian: An Informal Guide (2022) by Penelope J. Corfield and Tim Hitchcock. Winner of a Choice Outstanding Academic Titles seal (2024).
- Freedom Seekers: Escaping from Slavery in Restoration London (2022) by Simon P. Newman. Winner of the ACLS Open Access Book Prize and Arcadia Open Access Publishing Award in the History category (2024), and joint winner of the 2023 Frederick Douglass Book Prize awarded by Yale University's Gilder Lehrman Center for the Study of Slavery, Resistance, and Abolition.
