= Jane Wilson =

American painter (1924–2015)

- Born: April 29, 1924; Seymour, Iowa
- Died: January 13, 2015 (aged 90); New York, New York
- Education: University of Iowa
- Known for: Painting
- Spouse: John Gruen

Jane Wilson (1924–2015) was an American artist associated with both landscape painting and expressionism. She lived and worked in New York City and Water Mill, New York.

Wilson's painting American Horizon, was on display at the 2025 Inaugural Luncheon.

While pioneering in mixing realism with abstract, Jane was prefigured by Leonard Nelson, a protege of Peggy Guggenheim and Betty Parsons, and Leader of The Philadelphia School of Art.

== Early influences ==
Wilson was born in Seymour, Iowa on April 29, 1924. She grew up on a farm there during the Great Depression. She was the first of two girls born to Wayne Wilson, a civil engineer, and Cleone Margaret Marquis, a teacher, novelist and poet. Both parents came from farming families.

Wilson attributed her longstanding interest in landscapes to her deep relationship with natural elements as a child in Iowa. "The landscape was enormously meaningful to me," she said. "I used to roam around a lot by myself as a child, and when I think of a landscape, I think of the great weight of the sky and how it rests on the earth. And I remember the light. Light is specific to certain places, and what sort of light and landscape formation you grow up with is immensely influential to what you do later on."

In 1941, at the age of seventeen, Wilson enrolled at the University of Iowa, where she studied both painting and art history. The department had previously been chaired by Grant Wood, a painter associated with 1930s Regionalism. By the 1940s, however, the department looked toward New York City's burgeoning European ex-patriate and American Abstract Expressionist scenes. Dr. Lester D. Longman reorganized the faculty, which included James Lechay and Philip Guston. Of her undergraduate experience, Wilson said: "The head of the art department, Lester Longman, would travel to New York, select, and bring back whole exhibitions for our benefit, with painting ranging from the majestic expressionist Max Beckmann to the upstart, Jackson Pollock. Another time, Dr. Longman borrowed a hundred paintings from the Metropolitan Museum, hung them all over the art department for us to study and live with. So, back in the '40s we were exposed not only to real live masterpieces, but to the first glimmerings of Abstract Expressionism." After graduating Phi Beta Kappa, Wilson taught art history at the university for two years.

== New York in the 1950s ==
In 1949, Wilson moved to New York City with her husband John Jonas Gruen, who had been a fellow student. In New York City and on Long Island, Wilson became professionally and personally involved with a group of painters and poets (sometimes referred to as the New York School). Among the artists were Fairfield Porter, Larry Rivers, and Jane Freilicher, and among the poets were James Schuyler, John Ashbery and Frank O'Hara. In her painting, Wilson began to move toward abstraction and away from her academic training. In 1952, she began exhibiting with two cooperative galleries: Tanager Gallery and Hansa Gallery, where she was a founding member.

During the 1950s, Wilson also worked as a fashion model to help support her career as an artist. As a model, Wilson recognized the technical expertise and sculptural artistry involved in fashion design. Others in the art world, however, may have regarded this pursuit as "unseemly for a serious artist." Wilson defended her intellect by mentioning her years in academia.

By the mid-1950s, Wilson was increasingly focusing on producing expressionist landscapes. Of this period, Wilson said: "In 1956 and 7, I found myself in one of those lucid moments that occurs every twenty years and I realized I wasn't a second generation Abstract Expressionist. I looked at the ingredients of what I was painting and felt an uncontrollable allegiance to subject matter, and to landscape in particular."

In 1960, pop artist Andy Warhol commissioned Wilson to paint his portrait, Andy and Lilacs. Wilson appeared in one of Warhol's famous Screen Tests (films) and was included in his film 13 Most Beautiful Women.

In 1960, Wilson and her husband bought a carriage house with a large hayloft in Water Mill, NY on Long Island.

== Later career ==
Green Twilight by Jane Wilson (2002)

In the late 1960s, Wilson increasingly painted still lifes, continuing through the 1970s. In the early 1980s, she returned to painting landscapes.

In 1970, Wilson and her family appeared in Alice Neel's painting The Family (John Gruen, Jane Wilson, and Julia).

Wilson's image is included in the iconic 1972 poster Some Living American Women Artists by Mary Beth Edelson.

In 2002, Wilson received the Lifetime Achievement Award from the Guild Hall Museum in East Hampton, New York.

The New York Times art critic Roberta Smith praised Wilson's recent work in 2009: "DC Moore Gallery is showing Jane Wilson's latest luminous landscapes, which may be her best. They relegate land or water to a low-lying narrow strip to let light and clouds work their soft magic. The real subject here is color, which may make Ms. Wilson a postabstract Color Field painter."

Elisabeth Sussman has commented on the position of Jane Wilson's paintings in the present day: "What I find so remarkable about confronting Jane Wilson's paintings in the twenty-first century is how elegiac they look and how they simultaneously recall the poetic sensibilities of mid-century, when the syntax was kept simple, when everyday renditions of land and sky or of ordinary life could be at once benevolent and metaphysical--simple situations redolent of the vagaries and complexities of the day-to-day."

Wilson died on January 13, 2015, in New York City, aged 90.

== Process ==
In 1961, Wilson described her painting process in Art in America magazine:

"My paintings are done mostly from memory. After making simple indications of mass and movement, I start painting from the top down in thin color washes, working into it with paint a little thicker. While painting landscapes, my feeling is that the detail and the mass are built on varieties of paint applications, but when a painting is finished, these details have somehow become recognizable things. It is always a surprise to me how specific my paintings are. What I remember as color and paint put in a particular area of the painting because they were needed, has somehow become identifiable landscape elements. Figure and still life, however, are more aggressive as subject matter. Here my impulse is to pull the background as far forward as possible, to push the subject back into it; to reduce the specific—to insist on the paint and the painting."

== Critical response ==
Of her early work, Stuart Preston wrote: "[Jane Wilson] is a hedonist in paint, employing a plethora of strokes and bright colors that sometimes fall into still-lifes and figures but usually do not." Speaking of Wilson's work from the early 1950s, Dore Ashton wrote: "[She] is a young painter enchanted by the majesty of light. Her landscapes and even her figure studies are articulated in terms of the moods of the sun. Basically a frank expressionist, Miss Wilson brushes her landscapes energetically in strong color."

In 1957 she appeared in Life magazine as one of five leading young women painters, along with Joan Mitchell and Helen Frankenthaler. Also in the late 1950s, Time, Glamour, and Coronet magazines featured reviews and articles that increased her visibility and reputation as a painter.

In 1963, The New York Times critic John Canaday wrote: "Occasionally an artist comes along who puts a strain on the critic’s adjectival resources because half the adjectives that are appropriate as descriptions sound derogatory when they are meant to be laudatory. Jane Wilson, with a new show at the Tibor de Nagy Gallery, is such a painter. Sweetness is one of the undeniable qualities of her art, but to call a painting sweet is to damn it, even though Gainsborough and Berthe Morisot, both of whom Miss Wilson calls to mind, are among painters vulnerable to the same word. Like Gainsborough and Morisot, Miss Wilson knows how to handle a brush. She is so expert, so deft, so assured, that one fears from one exhibition to the next that her hand will take over and we will get that automatic, habitual flair with all the surface manifestations of vivacious sparkle and dulcet flow that are meaningless when the controlling sensitivity has grown careless or has been exhausted. Part of the delight (“delightful” is another partially suspect adjective) of Miss Wilson's painting is that in each picture she seems to have touched just that balance between delicacy and assurance..."

In 1984 critic Michael Brenson wrote in The New York Times: "The human world seems to be holding its breath through different stages of a continuing, sometimes heated debate among earth, water and sky. … In these landscapes… the intelligence and will of the artist are so thoroughly interiorized in the pictorial struggle that the paintings are experienced by the visitor well before and long after they are really seen."

In 1985, Paul Gardner wrote of Wilson's career: "In her own restrained way, without any pomp or puff, Wilson represents what the art world is about: staying power, whatever the trend of the moment, and a consistently developing body of work that results in a steadily increasing reputation."

In 1997, Lucy Sante wrote of Wilson's relationship with the sky: "Any one of Jane Wilson’s paintings is a marvel; the effect of a roomful is extraordinary. From the dark troubled ones to those whose pale gradients make them impossible to photograph, the array is overwhelmingly various as the work of one painter treating a single subject. And yet in all its abundance it might be seen as comprising one vast work, just as in its single, austere dedication it is expressive of the most unbridled extravagance, and in its primal nature it is endlessly renewable, eternally now. Together, Jane Wilson and the sky have made an encyclopedia of moods and textures and marks and palettes, delineating the immense multiple personality we collectively name weather. The sky, which has no memory of its own, is tremendously fortunate to have her as its portraitist, its analyst, its biographer."

In 2016 her biography was included in the exhibition catalogue Women of Abstract Expressionism organized by the Denver Art Museum.

Wilson exhibited steadily from 1953. She received many honors and widespread recognition for her work, including election to the American Academy of Arts and Letters, New York. Wilson was the first woman to be elected to the presidency of the National Academy of Design.

== Selected public collections ==
Wilson's paintings are included in the collections of major museums across the country, including:

- Brooklyn Museum, Brooklyn, NY
- Hirshhorn Museum and Sculpture Garden, Smithsonian Institution, Washington, DC
- The Metropolitan Museum of Art, New York, NY
- Museum of Modern Art, New York, NY
- National Academy Museum, New York, NY
- The National Academy of Design, New York, NY
- The Nelson-Atkins Museum of Art, Kansas City, MO
- Pennsylvania Academy of the Fine Arts, Philadelphia, PA
- San Francisco Museum of Modern Art, San Francisco, CA
- Smithsonian American Art Museum, Washington, DC
- Wadsworth Athenaeum Museum of Art, Hartford, CT
- Whitney Museum of American Art, New York, NY

== Bibliography ==
- Elizabeth Sussman, Jane Wilson: Horizons (London: Merrell Holberton, 2009) ISBN 978-1-85894-488-3
- John Jonas Gruen, The Party's over Now: Reminiscences of the Fifties-New York's Artists, Writers, Musicians, and Their Friends (Pushcart Press, 1989) ISBN 978-0-916366-54-4
