= Fran Ryan =

American actress (1916–2000)

- Born: Frances Mary Ryan; November 29, 1916; Los Angeles, California, U.S.
- Died: January 15, 2000 (aged 83); Burbank, California, U.S.
- Occupation: Actress
- Years active: 1922–1993
- Spouses: Walter Kenneth Wayne (m. 1949; died 1951); Howard Schafer (m. 1953; died 1953)
- Children: 1

Frances Mary Ryan (November 29, 1916 – January 15, 2000) was an American character actress featured in television and films. She was born in Los Angeles, California.

== Career ==
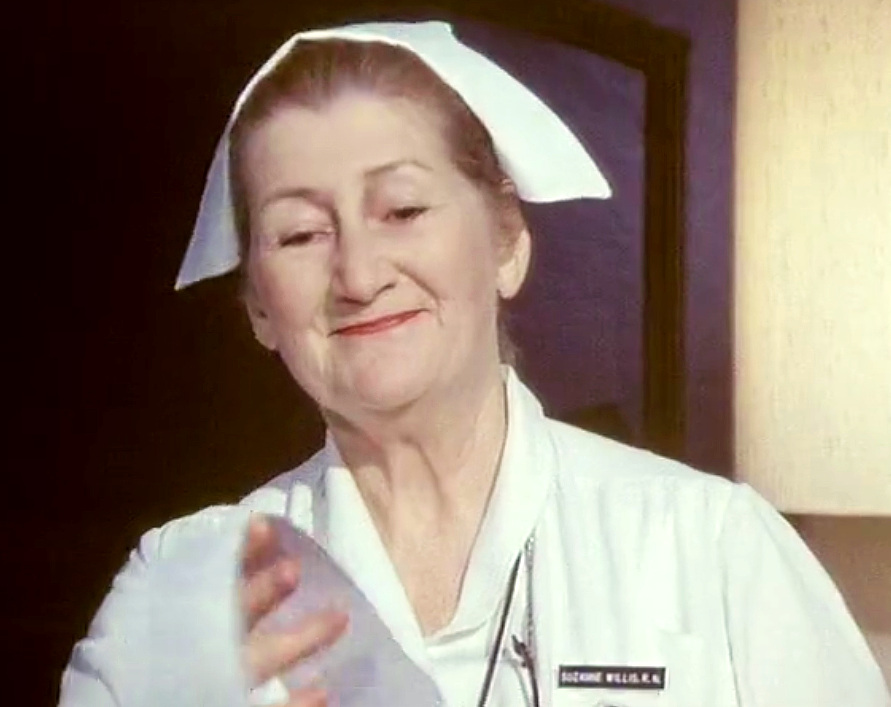
Fran Ryan in The Optimist

Ryan began performing at the age of six at Oakland's Henry Duffy Theatre. She attended Stanford University for three years, and during World War II was a member of the USO entertaining troops. She performed comedy, singing and acting on stage in California and Chicago, and launched her television career two decades later. Her television debut came in episode 43 of Batman, in 1966, followed by a bit part in Beverly Hillbillies. She also appeared in a 1972 episode of Columbo, Dagger of the Mind, as "uncredited woman at the airport."

Ryan's first supporting cast television role was as Aggie Thompson in the first several episodes of The Doris Day Show. The same season, she was offered the replacement role on the series Green Acres as Doris Ziffel from 1969 to 1971. Ryan replaced Barbara Pepper, who was in poor health. Ryan also starred on the long-running TV Western series Gunsmoke during its 20th and final season as Miss Hannah (Cobb). In 1987, she reprised the role of Miss Hannah in the TV movie Gunsmoke: Return to Dodge.

Ryan played the role of Rosie Carlson in the soap opera Days of Our Lives (1976–1979) and Sister Agatha in General Hospital in 1989. She also did voices for cartoons such as Hong Kong Phooey, Mister T, and Little Dracula. Fran starred on some TV shows for children, such as Sigmund and the Sea Monsters in 1975 as Gertrude Grouch, the 1970s children's show New Zoo Revue as Ms. Goodbody, the 1980s TV series No Soap, Radio as Mrs. Belmont, and the short-lived 1980s CBS TV series The Wizard as Tillie Russell from 1986 to 1987. Her last regular TV role was on The Dave Thomas Comedy Show.

Ryan also appeared in a series of commercials for Hungry Jack biscuits beginning in 1975.

She appeared in many feature films, including Big Wednesday (1978), as Frank and Jesse James' mother in The Long Riders (1980), Take This Job and Shove It (1981), Pale Rider (1985), Chances Are (1989), and a cameo appearance in 1981's Stripes, as a cab fare to Bill Murray as the cabbie, in the opening scenes of the film. Ryan made many guest appearances on TV shows, including Batman (episode 43), Adam-12, The Brady Bunch, CHiPs, The Dukes of Hazzard, Quantum Leap, Night Court, Taxi, Baywatch, and The Commish.

== Personal life ==
Fran's first husband, Walter Kenneth Wayne (whom she married in Fairbanks, Alaska, in 1949), died in a plane crash, in a plane he was piloting in January 1951, while Fran was pregnant with their first and only child. She gave birth to their son, Christopher, in April 1951. Fran remarried in January 1953 to Howard Schafer. Howard, too, perished in a plane crash in Oregon in May 1953 in a plane he was piloting. The wreckage of Howard's plane was not discovered until 15 years later in November 1968. The remains of Howard and his passengers were never found. All that was found at the crash site was a woman's shoe, four combs, and two pair of eyeglasses.

== Death ==
Ryan died on January 15, 2000, at age 83. She was cremated and her ashes buried in 2004 in the family plot, alongside her mother Mary, at the Holy Sepulchre Cemetery, Hayward, California.

== Filmography ==
=== Film ===
Year	Title	Role	Notes
1965	Mickey One	Homeless Woman	Uncredited
1970	Scream, Evelyn, Scream!	The Old Woman	
1971	Scandalous John	Farm Woman	
1971	The Million Dollar Duck	Mrs. Purdham	Uncredited
1974	How to Seduce a Woman	Mrs. Toklas	
1975	The Apple Dumpling Gang	Mrs. Stockley	
1976	Family Plot	Registrar Clerk	Uncredited
1978	Straight Time	Cafe Owner	
1978	Big Wednesday	Lucy	
1978	The Great Brain	Aunt Bertha	
1979	Rocky II	Adrian’s Nurse	
1980	The Long Riders	Mrs. Zerelda Cole Samuel	
1981	Americana	Colonel	
1981	Take This Job and Shove It	Mrs. Hinkle	
1981	Circle of Power	Marie Davis	
1981	Stripes	Dowager in Cab	
1981	Christmas Mountain	Flora	
1982	Shoot the Moon	Judge	Uncredited
1982	Savannah Smiles	Farmer Wilma	
1982	Flush	Belle Chance	
1983	Tough Enough	Gert Long	
1983	Private School	Miss Dutchbok	
1983	Eyes of Fire	Calvin's Wife	
1985	The Sure Thing	Lady in Car	
1985	Rebel Love	Granny Plug	
1985	Pale Rider	Ma Blankenship	
1986	Stewardess School	Fainting Lady	
1986	Quiet Cool	Ma	
1988	Lucky Stiff	Ma	
1989	Out Cold	Arlene	
1989	Chances Are	Mavis Talmadge	
1993	Suture	Mrs. Lucerne	

=== Television ===
Year	Title	Role	Notes
1965	The Front Line presented by Reader's Digest	Customer	Episode: "How To Be An Effective Supermarket Checker"
1966	Batman	Chairlady	Episode: "The Greatest Mother of Them All"
1967	The Second Hundred Years	Mrs. Sanders	Episode: "No Experience Necessary"
1968	The Beverly Hillbillies	Mrs. Meek	Episode: "The Housekeeper"
1968	The Doris Day Show	Aggie Thompson	10 episodes
1969	Daniel Boone	Mrs. Jones	Episode: "Love and Equity"
1969	Marcus Welby, M.D.	Nurse Prifogle	Episode: "A Matter of Humanities"
1969	Mr. Deeds Goes to Town (TV series)	Rosie	Episode: "The Wonderful Old Saloon"
1969	The Bill Cosby Show	Mrs. Beal	Episode: "Rules Is Rules"
1969	Adam-12	Mrs. Killian	Episode: "Log 142: As High as You Are"
1970	I Dream of Jeannie	Switchboard Operator	Episode: "One of Our Hotels Is Growing"
1970	The Brady Bunch	Mrs. Hunsaker	Episode: "To Move or Not to Move"
1970	The Bold Ones: The Lawyers	Edna	Episode: "Trial of a PFC"
1970	Men at Law	Mrs. Kenton	Episode: "Where Were We, Waldo?"
1970	The Partridge Family	1st Wife	Episode: "My Son, the Feminist"
1969-1971	Green Acres	Doris Ziffel / Minnie Holcombe	7 episodes
1971	Night Gallery	Third Witch	(segment "Witches' Feast"), Episode: "Death in the Family/The Merciful/Class of '99/Witches' Feast"
1971	The Jimmy Stewart Show	Laundry Manager	Episode: "Guest of Honor"
1972	Nichols	Minnie Dowd	Episode: "About Jesse James"
1972	McCloud	Nurse	Episode: "Give My Regrets to Broadway"
1972	Bonanza	Widow Lucas	Episode: "A Visit to Upright"
1972	Return to Peyton Place	Dr. Helen Randall	
1972	Ironside	Charge Nurse	Episode: "Five Days in the Death of Sgt. Brown"
1972	New Zoo Revue	Ms. Goodbody	
1972	The Bold Ones: The New Doctors	E.R. Nurse	Episode: "A Very Strange Triangle"
1972	Columbo	Woman at Airport	Uncredited, Episode: "Dagger of the Mind"
1973	The New Dick Van Dyke Show	Mom	Episode: "Exit Laughing"
1974	Hog Wild	Flora	TV movie
1974	Hong Kong Phooey		Voice
1974	Devlin	voices	
1973-1974	Sigmund and the Sea Monsters	Gertrude	5 episodes
1972-1975	Gunsmoke	Hannah / Mrs. Keller	6 episodes
1975	The Family Holvak	Mavis Bidwell	Episode: "The Long Way Home: Part 2"
1975	The Rookies	Ma Burker	Episode: "Ladies Day"
1976	Good Heavens	Ma Buckingham	Episode: "See Jane Run"
1976	The Quest	Mag Wood	Episode: "Seventy-Two Hours"
1976	Stalk the Wild Child	Ellen Mott	TV movie
1976	Visions	Martha Stedman	Episode: "Liza's Pioneer Diary"
1977	Panic in Echo Park		TV movie
1977	Mary Hartman, Mary Hartman	Miss Adeline Jeeter	15 episodes
1977	Barney Miller	Mrs. Hirsch, Homeless Woman	Episode: "Corporation"
1977	James at 16	Woman Construction Worker	Episode: "Higher Ground"
1977	Deadly Game	Frieda Beezly	TV movie
1977-1978	One Day at a Time		Episodes: "The Dress Designer" (1978) as Eve "Julie's Operation" (1977) as Nurse
1978	The Life and Times of Grizzly Adams	Gerty	Episode: "The Great Burro Race"
1976-1978	Starsky & Hutch	Landlady / Miss Bycroft / Stella	3 episodes
1978	CHiPs	Nancy / Lady Driver	Episodes: "Trick or Trick" as Nancy "Surf's Up" as Lady Driver
1977-1978	Charlie's Angels	Belle Asher / Nurse Fager	2 episodes
1979	How the West Was Won	Mrs. Holmes	Episode: "Hillary"
1978-1979	Carter Country	Martha	Episode: "The Big Move: Part 2" (1979) as Martha "Roy's Separation" (1978)
1979	Salvage 1	Melba	Episode: "Confederate Gold"
1976-1979	Days of Our Lives	Rosie Carlson	7 episodes
1979	Who's on Call?	Nurse Bremer	Episode: "Pilot"
1979	Goldie and the Boxer	Cook	TV movie
1980	When the Whistle Blows	May	Episode: "Wildcatters"
1981	The Dukes of Hazzard	Ma Harper	Episode: "Duke vs. Duke"
1981	The Waltons	Eula Mae Moonie	Episode: "The Hostage"
1981	The Adventures of Nellie Bly	Mrs. Roman	TV movie
1982	Father Murphy	Toby's Mom	Episode: "Eighty-Eight Keys to Happiness"
1982	Benson	Molly Emerson	"Clayton's Condo"
1982	Taxi	Mrs. Elizabeth Weber	Episode: "Elegant Iggy"
1982	No Soap, Radio	Mrs. Belmont	5 episodes
1982	Life of the Party: The Story of Beatrice	Beatrice's Mother	TV movie
1982	Johnny Belinda	Aunt Aggie McAdam	TV movie
1983	Laverne & Shirley	Mother Superior	Episode: "The Monastery Show"
1983	It Takes Two	Bridget	Episode: "Mother and Child Reunion"
1983	The Optimist	Matron	Episode: "Healthy Body, Unhealthy Mind"
1983	Ghost Dancing	Judge	TV movie
1983	Mister T	voice	
1983	Matt Houston	Maggie	Episode: "Marilyn"
1983	Falcon Crest	Cass	Episode: "Solitary Confinements"
1983	Manimal	Sadie Bethune	Episode: "Night of the Beast"
1983-1984	Three's Company	Grace / Hilda	2 episodes
1984	The Return of Marcus Welby, M.D.	Millie Clark	TV movie
1984	The New Scooby-Doo Mysteries		Voice, Episode: "Happy Birthday, Scooby-Doo"
1984	Hill Street Blues	Mary Minot	Episode: "The Rise and Fall of Paul the Wall"
1985	Hollywood Wives	Nina Carrolle	TV miniseries
1985	Hell Town	Mother Maggie	TV movie
1985	Punky Brewster	Isabelle Peavey	Episode: "Love Thy Neighbor"
1986	Amazing Stories	Mrs. Abbott	Episode: "The Sitter"
1986	Hardcastle and McCormick	Mrs. Vassah	Episode: "In the Eye of the Beholder"
1986	The Colbys	Helen Webster	Episode: "Anniversary Waltz"
1974-1986	The Magical World of Disney	Flora / Mrs. Langendorf	3 episodes
1986	Brothers	Mrs. Murphy	Episode: "Wake Me Up Before You Go Go"
1986-1987	The Wizard	Tillie Russell	19 episodes
1987	The New Mike Hammer	Mike's New Secretary	Episode: "A Blinding Fear"
1987	Highway to Heaven	Lil	Episodes: "Man's Best Friend: Part 1 and 2"
1987	Gunsmoke: Return to Dodge	Hannah	TV movie
1987	Webster	Lt. Col. Howard	Episode: "Grab Bag"
1987	Houston Knights	Minnie Elizabeth Lundy	Episode: "Secrets"
1988	Mr. Belvedere	Mrs. Deferschmidt	Episode: "Duel"
1988	Murphy Brown	The Asp	Episode: "Nowhere to Run"
1989	Murder, She Wrote	Rose Mulligan	Episode: "The Sins of Castle Cove"
1989	Matlock	Doris Curtis	Episode: "The Priest"
1989	Nick Knight	Jeannie	TV movie
1990	Empty Nest	Mrs. Kramer	Episode: "Take My Mom, Please"
1990	Archie: To Riverdale and Back Again	Miss Grundy	TV movie
1990	The Dave Thomas Comedy Show	Fran	5 episodes
1990	Chip 'n Dale: Rescue Rangers	School Teacher / Camembert Kate	2 episodes
1987-1990	Night Court	Miss Crombie / Ethel La Rue	3 episodes
1990	Quantum Leap	Dorothy Jaeger	Episode: "The Boogieman - October 31, 1964"
1990	Over My Dead Body	Building Manager	Episode: "Pilot"
1990	Thanksgiving Day	Lois	TV movie
1990	The New Adam-12	Ida Collins	Episode: "Blue Avengers"
1990	Davis Rules	Miss Catworthy	Episode: "Mission: Improbable"
1991	Little Dracula	Hannah the Barbarian	Voice
1991	Baywatch	Tillie McCabe	Episode: "Thin or Die"
1991	Homefront	Sister Theophane	Episode: "Sinners Reconciled"
1992	Tiny Toon Adventures	Grandma Duff	Voice, Episode: "Grandma's Dead"
1993	River of Rage: The Taking of Maggie Keene	Hattie Clandell	TV movie
1993	The Commish	Doris	Episode: "Dying Affection", (final appearance)
