= Third hand =

Third hand may refer to:

- Helping hand (tool), also known as a third hand, a type of jig used in soldering and craftwork
- Autoblock, also known as a third hand, a rope device used in climbing and caving
- The Third Hand, a 2007 album by RJD2
- The Third Hand (film), a 1981 Hong Kong adult film
- Judgement Day (1988 film), also known as The Third Hand, a 1988 American horror film
- Third-hand smoke, contamination by tobacco smoke following the extinguishing of a combustible tobacco product
- Third hand (card player), the third in line to receive cards, bid or play in a card game
- Third hand, see Glossary of contract bridge terms#thirdhand
- Third hand, another term for the boatswain of a fishing vessel
