= Ken Sutherland =

American songwriter

- Born: 1939 (age 86–87); New York City, NY, United States
- Occupations: Composer; lyricist; playwright; artist
- Years active: 1972–present

Ken Sutherland (born 1939) is a composer, lyricist, playwright and artist who has written songs and scores for a number of movies, including the award-winning Savannah Smiles.

== Early life ==
Born in New York City, N.Y., Sutherland moved with his family to Westchester County after his father returned home from World War II. Sutherland's future career in advertising and later music was strongly influenced by his Canadian-born father, who became a naturalized U.S. citizen before enlisting in the Marine Corps. The elder Sutherland went on to become Director of National Advertising for Life magazine, then joined Compton Advertising and later became a fundraiser for his alma mater, Yale University. During his student days at Yale, Sutherland's father sang in double quartet called ‘The Eight Sons of Eli,” and the group had a show on CBS radio. Sutherland's father was continually ensconced in music one way or another and took his two older sons to every Broadway show, Gilbert and Sullivan concert and other musical events whenever possible.

== Career ==
=== From advertising to songwriting ===
Ken Sutherland earned a degree in Industrial Design from Carnegie Institute of Technology (now Carnegie Mellon University) and started his career at the NASA research facility in Cleveland, Ohio. From there, he moved into advertising as an account executive at Fuller, Smith and Ross before joining the Baker Division of Otis Elevator as assistant director of Advertising and then moved to Cleveland's largest home-grown ad agency, Griswold-Eshleman. When the opportunity to return to New York arose, Sutherland took the leap and went to work with what he calls “the hippest agency in the business”, Ogilvy & Mather. There, he had the good fortune to work for the legendary David Ogilvy. Several years later he moved to McCann-Erickson in Houston, Texas, where he worked on the marketing challenge of changing the names of Esso and Enco to Exxon.

While at McCann, Sutherland heard another voice calling and segued out of the account service side of advertising to the creative. While at McCann, he wrote the first commercial jingle for the newly named Exxon Oil Company. That encouraged him to shift his talents to music, and he left the security of a corporate job to build the largest independent commercial music production company in the Southwest. In addition to running his commercial music business, he started writing songs for various publishers, producers and artists in Los Angeles, California. He also wrote the theme for President Richard Nixon’s 1972 presidential campaign: “Nixon Now More Than Ever, Nixon Now,” performed by, among others, The Mike Curb Congregation. That same year, Sutherland wrote the United Way's official theme song, “Thanks To You,” which has been recorded by various artists, including The Mike Curb Congregation. Over the years, Sutherland has worked with recording artists such as Red Steagall, Lee Greenwood, Mickey Gilley and David Loggins, Sandy Patti and Gene Redding, to name a few.

=== Movie scores ===
Through a chance meeting on a flight to Houston from Los Angeles, Sutherland met actor/writer Mark Miller who was trying to get an original screenplay funded and produced. Ken offered to write the title song for the film and when it was financed in 1982, Miller hired Sutherland to write both the songs and score for the film Savannah Smiles. The movie was named “Family Film of the Year” in 1983 by the Motion Picture Association of America, and copies of the movie are still available at on-line retailers while the soundtrack continues to sell on music digital download sites. One of the songs in the film – "Pretty Girl" performed by country recording artist Red Steagall – is, according to Sutherland, often requested by brides for the Father/Daughter dance at their wedding reception. Another song from the film - “Another Dusty Road” - remains the signature song for the Oklahoma band, Mountain Smoke. Other film-scoring opportunities arose and Sutherland moved to Los Angeles to continue his career. Films scored by Sutherland include Papa Was A Preacher (1985) for legendary producer Martin Jurow with Grammy-winner Sandy Patti performing the closing credits song, “The Door Is Open, The Light Is On..” Other film scores composed and conducted by Sutherland are Shadows on the Wall (1986) with Wilford Brimley, Dark Before Dawn (1988) with Doug McClure, and Big Bad John (1990) with Ned Beatty, Jack Elam and Jimmy Dean.

In 1984, Sutherland teamed up with orchestrator Phil Kelly to create the words and music for a one-performance musical in Las Vegas, Nev., for the Southland Corporation's “Salute To America.” Additional writing assignments came from across the country and even from the Middle East where Sutherland scored a television project for the Saudi Arabian government. In 1985, Sutherland wrote and produced the song, “Here Is My Love, Pass It Along,” which he recorded with a number of artists who were either born or bred in Texas, including: Steven Stills, Billy Preston, Jerry Jeff Walker, B. J. Thomas, Shelley Duvall, Alex Harvey, Charley Pride, Mary Wilson, the Gatlin Brothers and Sami Jo Cole to name just a few. The project raised money for The North Dallas Food Bank.

=== Lippi, the Musical ===
Moving to Dallas in 1995, Sutherland launched into the creation, development and production of a new musical based on the life of unconventional early Renaissance master Fra Filippo Lippi. The show: Lippi, the Musical standing-ovations at staged readings in both Dallas and New York. Now the producers are raising capital to produce a Developmental Lab production with the hope of moving to a commercial stage. Sutherland has also written the score for a feature-length documentary called Dancing With Torah for producer/director Robert O. Curry with the support of the Simon Wiesenthal Holocaust Museum.

=== Murals ===
When not working on a music project, Sutherland enjoyed the opportunity to create and install murals for both commercial businesses and residences. His work can be seen in Dallas and Fort Worth, Texas, where in 2003 he and his team painted the largest piece of outdoor public art in North Texas entitled “A Community In Harmony.”.

=== Update ===
Ken Sutherland died in March 2019 due to complications of Parkinson's disease.
