= Bobby Bridger =

American artist

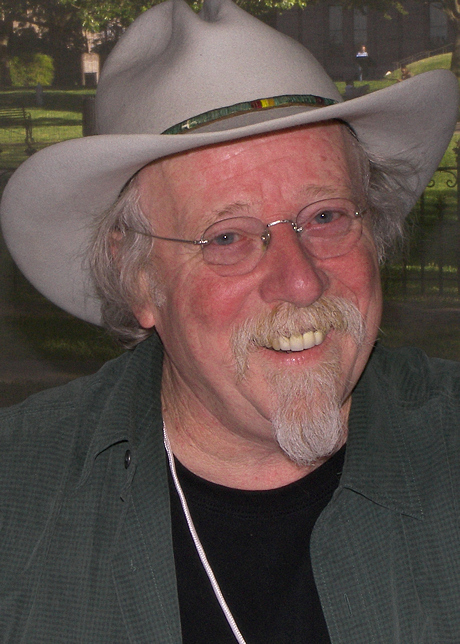
Bobby Bridger at the 2009 Texas Book Festival.

Bobby Bridger (born Robert Durham in Columbia, Louisiana March 14, 1945) is a singer/songwriter/poet/actor/playwright/author and painter who for five decades has traveled the globe performing a trilogy of one man shows for audiences in America, Canada, Europe, Australia and Russia. He has recorded numerous albums for labels including Monument Records, RCA and Golden Egg Records. On television he appeared twice (1976 and 1978) on the early years of PBS's "Austin City Limits", on American Experience on PBS, and on ABC's "Good Morning America", A & E and C-SPAN, as well as on NPR on radio. He is the composer of "Heal In The Wisdom", the official anthem of the Kerrville Folk Festival for over 40 years. In April, 1988 Bridger sang "Heal in the Wisdom" to close the first "GlobalForum of Spiritual and Parliamentary Leaders on Human Survival" at Christ Church, Oxford, England.

Bridger has been an artist-in-residence at the Buffalo Bill Historical Center in Cody, WY., the Eugene O'Neill Theater Center in Waterford, CT, the John G. Neihardt Center in Bancroft, NE and Yellowstone National Park. Bridger starred in Dale Wasserman's groundbreaking musical, Shakespeare and The Indians and was featured with David Carradine and Will Sampson in the drama Black Elk Speaks. Full company productions of Bridger's Seekers of the Fleece ran for eight consecutive summer seasons in Wyoming. He is the author of the award-winning book, Buffalo Bill and Sitting Bull: Inventing The Wild West (ISBN 978-0-292-70917-1), Bridger also recorded an audiobook of "Buffalo Bill and Sitting Bull: Inventing the Wild West", An Autobiography, Bridger (ISBN 978-0-292-71904-0), Where theTall Grass Grows (ISBN 978-1-55591-454-7), and A Ballad of the West and contributed essays to anthologies on western icons Frank Waters and John G. Neihardt as well as numerous magazine and newspaper features. He is the subject of the documentary film "Quest Of An Epic Balladeer" and a DVD production of live performances of his trilogy of one man shows was released in 2005. He is the 2016 recipient of the John G. Neihardt Foundation's prestigious "Word Sender" Award. In 2019 Bridger produced an audiobook of Vine Deloria Jr.'s classic, The World We Used to Live In: Remembering the Powers of the Medicine Men. He also produced an audiobook of Vine Deloria, Jr.'s classic, "God Is Red". In December, 2022 The Northeast Louisiana Music Trail Association installed a historical marker in Columbia, Louisiana honoring Bridger's contributions to music, literature, and theater.
