= Pink Motel =

1982 film

- Directed by: Mike MacFarland
- Screenplay by: Jim Kouf
- Produced by: Ed Elbert
- Starring: Slim Pickens; Phyllis Diller; Andrea Howard
- Release date: 1982
- Country: United States
- Language: English

Pink Motel is a 1982 American sex comedy film.

== Plot ==
A couple who own a cheap hotel (Phyllis Diller and Slim Pickens, in his final role) must deal with the various eccentric people who rent their rooms.

== Critical reception ==
The New York Times, "An unfunny attempt at sexual comedy" and compared it to the TV love-anthology series Love, American Style.
