= Visions of Death =

Visions of Death, also known as Visions, is a 1972 American television film written by Paul Playdon, directed by Lee H. Katzin and starring Monte Markham and Telly Savalas.

== Plot ==
A professor who has visions of the future informs the police that someone is about to plant a bomb. He then discovers that the police consider him the prime suspect.

== Cast ==
- Monte Markham as Prof. Mark Lowell
- Barbara Anderson as Susan Schaeffer
- Telly Savalas as Lt. Phil Keegan
- Tim O'Connor as Dr. Bert Hayes
- Joseph Sirola as George Simpson
- Lonny Chapman as Martin Binzech
- Jim Antonio as Sgt. Ted Kroel
