= Monte Markham =

American actor (born 1935)

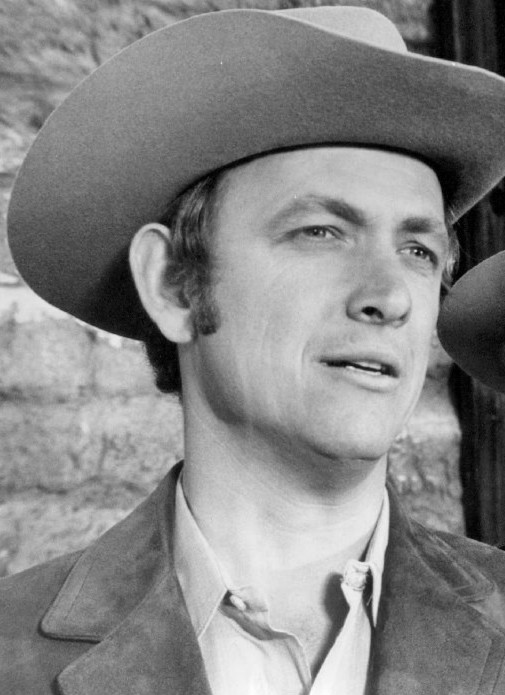
- Markham in 1969
- Born: June 21, 1935 (age 91); Manatee County, Florida, U.S.
- Occupations: Actor; director; producer
- Years active: 1966–present
- Spouse: Klaire Keevil Hester (m. 1961)
- Children: 2

Monte Markham (born June 21, 1935) is an American actor. He has appeared in films, television series, and on Broadway.

== Early life ==
Markham was born in Manatee County, Florida, one of four sons of Millie Content (née Willbur) and Jesse Edward Markham Sr., who was a merchant. He attended Palm Beach State College before graduating from the University of Georgia with a master's degree in theater. Markham also served 10 years as an officer in the United States Coast Guard.

== Television ==
Markham played the dual roles of Luke and Ken Carpenter in the 1967–1968 ABC sitcom The Second Hundred Years, and portrayed Harry Kellem in the original Hawaii Five-O. In 1969–70, he starred in the television series Mr. Deeds Goes to Town, based on the 1936 movie of the same name.

Markham had the title role in The New Perry Mason (1973–1974). This casting took him out of consideration for the lead role of cyborg Steve Austin in The Six Million Dollar Man, which debuted the same year. He instead appeared in two episodes of the series, as a race-car driver who also becomes a cyborg following an accident (first named Barney Miller, then Barney Hiller), in episodes aired in 1974 and 1975.

In 1975, Markham played the dual roles of Vince Barrett and Rick Hatfield in the Barnaby Jones episode "Doomed Alibi" and portrayed the criminally insane character Pike in the episode "Power Play" in the revival of The Invisible Man.

Markham appeared as Blanche Devereaux's gay brother, Clayton Hollingsworth, on the NBC sitcom The Golden Girls, in two episodes.

From 1989–1992, he played the role of Captain Don Thorpe, senior lifeguard on Baywatch. He narrated several documentary series that appeared on the History Channel in the mid to late 1990s and served as a consultant, director, producer, and narrator for A&E's Classroom, The Great Ships and Air Combat.

== Stage ==
One of his earliest stage experiences was at the Oregon Shakespeare Festival in the summer of 1961, where he played Horatio in Hamlet. Markham made his Broadway debut in 1973 in Irene, for which he won the Theatre World Award. He also appeared on Broadway in Same Time, Next Year (1975).

== Film ==
Markham's film work includes Hour of the Gun, Guns of the Magnificent Seven, Midway, Airport '77, and We Are Still Here. Ginger in the Morning 1974.

== Filmography ==
=== Film ===
Year	Film	Role	Notes
1967	Hour of the Gun	Sherman McMasters	
1968	Project X	Gregory Gallea	
1969	Guns of the Magnificent Seven	Keno	
1971	Death Takes a Holiday	David Smith	TV film
1972	The Astronaut	Eddie Reese/Colonel Brice Randolph	TV film
1972	One Is a Lonely Number	Howard Carpenter	
1972	Visions of Death	Professor Mark Lowell	TV film
1974	Ginger in the Morning	Joe	
1975	Hustling	Orin Dietrich	TV film
1976	Midway	Commander Max Leslie	
1977	Airport '77	Banker	
1977	Relentless	Paul Vickers	TV film
1978	Shame, Shame on the Bixby Boys	Mordecai	
1980	Ghosts of Buxley Hall	Colonel Joe Buxley	TV film
1981	Separate Ways	Cliff Johnson	
1982	Drop-Out Father	Tony Malgrado	TV film
1982	Hotline	Kyle Durham	TV film
1983	Off the Wall	Governor Paul Smith	
1986	Jake Speed	Mr. Winston	
1987	Hot Pursuit	Bill Cronenberg	
1988	Defense Play	Mark Denton	
1988	Judgement Day	Sam	
1989	Baywatch: Panic at Malibu Pier	Captain Don Thorpe	TV film
1991	Neon City	Captain Raymond	
1995	Piranha	J. R. Randolph	TV film
1999	Chinatown: Strangers in a StrangeLand	Narrator	TV film
2011	Beach Bar	Crabs	
2012	Music High	Principal Owen Clark	
2014	Life Partners	Ken	
2015	We Are Still Here	Dave McCabe	
2016	The Rift	Dysart	
2017	Death of the Sheik	Doctor Meeker	
2018	Get Married or Die	Bill	
2018	Edge of Isolation	Ivan Polifer	
2018	Daddy Issues	Gordon Craw	
2018	Reborn	Dr. Hetch	
2020	The 11th Green	Nelson Rudd	
2020	A Dark Foe	Mr. Lorne	
2020	Acquitted by Faith	Jack Cromer	

=== Television ===
Year	Film	Role	Notes
1966	Mission: Impossible	Tosk	Episode: "Old Man Out"
1967	Iron Horse	Dan Patrick	Episode: "Death by Triangulation"
1967–1968	The Second Hundred Years	Luke/Ken Carpenter	Lead role
1968	The F.B.I.	Thomas Waters	Episode: "The Intermediary"
1969	Here Come the Brides	Bass	Episode: "The Firemaker"
1969	The Mod Squad	Billy Kilgore	Episode: "Fear Is the Bucking Horse"
1969	My Friend Tony		Episode: "Welcome Home, Jerry Stanley"
1969–1970	Mr. Deeds Goes to Town	Longfellow Deeds	Recurring role
1970	Bracken's World	Ray Wiley	Episode: "A Perfect Piece of Casting"
1970	The Virginian	Boss Cooper	Episode: "Gun Quest"
1970	The High Chaparral	Dave Redman	Episode: "Too Late the Epitaph"
1970	Hogan's Heroes	Captain James Martin	Episode: "Eight O'Clock and All Is Well"
1970	The Young Rebels	William Billings	Episode: "Valley of the Guns"
1970	The Bold Ones: The Lawyers	Nick Chapman	Episode: "The People Against Doctor Chapman"
1970	Love, American Style	Steve	Segment: "Love and Those Poor Crusaders' Wives"
1970	Love, American Style	Andy	Segment: "Love and the Pen Pals"
1970	The F.B.I.	Arthur McBride	Episode: "The Architect"
1970	Hawaii Five-O	Harry Kellem	Episode: "The Double Wall"
1971	The Mary Tyler Moore Show	John Corcoran	Episode: "Just a Lunch"
1971	Dan August	Frank Devlin	Episode: "Dead Witness to a Killing"
1971	The Name of the Game	Charlie	Episode: "A Capitol Affair"
1971	Alias Smith and Jones	Jim Stokely	Episode: "Something to Get Hung About"
1971	Love, American Style	Larry	Segment: "Love and the Married Bachelor"
1971	Funny Face		Episode: "Four Sided Triangle"
1971	Sarge	Tom Flynn	Episode: "A Bad Case of Monogamy"
1971	The F.B.I.	James Robert Devlin	Episode: "The Recruiter"
1971	Hawaii Five-O	Jerry Rhodes	Episode: "Wednesday, Ladies Free"
1972	The New Dick Van Dyke Show	Bill Mitchell	Episode: "After the Ball Is Over"
1972	Medical Center	Dr. Grainger	Episode: "The Choice" (Unsold Pilot for a Proposed TV series)
1973	Hawaii Five-O	Barry Dean	Episode: "Here Today... Gone Tonight"
1973–1974	The New Perry Mason	Perry Mason	Starring role
1974	Medical Center	Scott	Episode: "Adults Only"
1974	The Manhunter	Keeley Maxwell	Episode: "The Doomsday Gang"
1974	Police Woman	Joey Marr	Episode: "The Stalking of Joey Marr"
1974–1975	The Six Million Dollar Man	Barney Miller	2 episodes
1975	Barnaby Jones	Vince Barrett, Rick Hatfield	Episode: "Doomed Alibi"
1975	Cannon	Ed Foster 'Condor'	Episode: "Vengeance"
1975	Caribe	Charles Mayfield	Episode: "Lady Killer"
1975	Ellery Queen	Tom McKell	Episode: "Too Many Suspects"
1975	Medical Story	Raphael Aldrich	Episode: "Woman in White"
1976	The Invisible Man	Pike	Episode: "Power Play"
1976	McNaughton's Daughter	David Borman	Episode: "Love Is a Four-Letter Word"
1976	Quincy, M.E.	Harold Fredericks	Episode: "Who's Who in Neverland"
1976	The Quest	Nelson Story	Episode: "The Freight Train Rescue"
1977	The Hardy Boys/Nancy Drew Mysteries	Professor Jack Wall	Episode: "The Mystery of Pirate's Cove"
1977	Police Woman	Bishop	Episode: "Guns"
1978	Lucan	Steven Demaree	Episode: "How Do You Run Forever?"
1978	What Really Happened to the Class of '65?	Coach Briggs	Episode: "Class Renegade"
1979	The Littlest Hobo	Ray Caldwell	Episode: "Smoke"
1979	Trapper John, M.D.	Beaumont	Episode: "Love Is a Three-Way Street"
1979	A Man Called Sloane	Jonathan Cambro	Episode: "The Venus Microbe"
1980	Hawaii Five-O	Jack Ellington	Episode: "School for Assassins"
1980	Eight Is Enough	Michael Hayes	Episode: "A Matter of Mentors"
1980	The Incredible Hulk	Colonel Brad	Episode: "Prometheus: Part II"
1980	Disneyland	Colonel Joe Buxley	Episode: "The Ghosts of Buxley Hall"
1980	Beyond Westworld	Captain Mike Nicholson	Episode: "Take-Over"
1980	The Love Boat	Captain Brad Wells	Episode: "Boomerang/Captain's Triangle/Out of This World"
1980	Fantasy Island	Edmond Dumont	Episode: "Crescendo/Three Feathers"
1981	Dallas	Clint Ogden	Recurring role
1981	Hart to Hart	Robert Carney	Episode: "What Becomes a Murder Most?"
1982	The Fall Guy	Ryker	Episode: "License to Kill"
1982	Today's FBI	Dr. London	Episode: "Serpent in the Garden"
1982	Bret Maverick	Captain Dawkins	Episode: "The Vulture Also Rises"
1982	Matt Houston	Richard Hoyt	Episode: "Joey's Here"
1982	Jack Holborn	Trumpet	Miniseries
1982	Fantasy Island	Walter Lukas	Episode: "The Magic Camera/Mata Hari/Valerie"
1982	Fantasy Island	Ron Martin	Episode: "Face of Love/Image of Celeste"
1983	Simon & Simon	Professor Altman	Episode: "Psyched Out"
1983	The Love Boat	Joe Costello	Episode: "The Captain's Crush/Out of My Hair/Off-Course Romance"
1983	Fantasy Island	Dr. Mark Reed	Episode: "Nurses Night Out"
1983	Hotel	Daniel Brunell	Episode: "Designs"
1984	The A-Team	Lt. Mason Harnett	Episode: "Say It with Bullets"
1984	The Master	CIA Head	Episode: "Hostages"
1984	Finder of Lost Loves	Galen Smith	Episode: "Maxwell Ltd: Finder of Lose Loves Pilot"
1984	Rituals	Carter Robertson	Recurring role
1986	Blacke's Magic	Douglas Shayne	Episode: "Death Goes to the Movies"
1986	Murder, She Wrote	Ned Olson	Episode: "If a Body Meet a Body"
1987	Hotel	John Granger	Episode: "Glass People"
1987	Murder, She Wrote	Inspector Donald Matheney	Episode: "Doom with a View"
1988	1st & Ten	Charles	Episode: "The Bulls Own Up"
1988	The Golden Girls	Clayton Hollingsworth	2 Episodes: "Scared Straight" and "Sister of the Bride"
1989	1st & Ten	Medford	Episode: "Duty Calls"
1989–1992	Baywatch	Captain Don Thorpe	Recurring role
1991	Murder, She Wrote	Andrew Gant	Episode: "Family Doctor"
1993	Murder, She Wrote	Jimmy Haynes	Episode: "The Survivor"
1994	Melrose Place	John Parker	Recurring role
1994-1995	Grace Under Fire	Travis Taylor	2 episodes
1994-1995	Biography	Narrator	Recurring role
1995	Burke's Law	Philip D'Arcy	Episode: "Who Killed the Sweet Smell of Success?"
1995-1996	Campus Cops	Dean Pilkington	Recurring role
1996	Star Trek: Deep Space Nine	Fullerton	Episode: "Let He Who Is Without Sin..."
1996–2005	The Great Ships	Narrator	Recurring Role
1998	Diagnosis: Murder	Sheriff Kelso	Episode: "Dead in the Water"
1999	Honey, I Shrunk the Kids: The TV Show	William Tecumseh Jennings	2 episodes
2001	Fly Past	Narrator	Miniseries
2009	Cold Case	Glenn Drew '09	Episode: "The Brush Man"
2011	Extraordinary Fidelity	Narrator	Documentary
2011	Fringe	Dr. Blake West	Episode: "Wallflower"
2012	Fringe	Leland Spivey	Episode: "The End of All Things"
2012	Leverage	Dr. Everett Udall	Episode: "The Rundown Job"
2015	The PET Squad Files	Kerry Ling	Episode: "Welcome to F***ing Hollywood"

=== Video games ===
Year	Title	Role
2010	Fallout: New Vegas	President Aaron Kimball
