= Christmas Mountain =

1981 film

- 2008 DVD cover
- Directed by: Pierre de Moro Giafferi
- Written by: Mark Miller
- Produced by: Laurette de Moro Giafferi
- Starring: Mark Miller; Slim Pickens; Barbara Stanger
- Release date: 1981
- Running time: 90 minutes
- Country: United States
- Language: English

Christmas Mountain: The Story of a Cowboy Angel is a 1981 Western film about the true meaning of the Christmas spirit. Starring Mark Miller of Savannah Smiles and Slim Pickens in one of his final roles, the film was originally produced and released in 1981. The original 16MM master was then lost for 20 years. Jack Evans, a partner and financier of the original film, eventually regained possession of the master. It was digitally remastered by Victory Studios of Los Angeles in 2008, and is now available on DVD.

A review of the original release in The New York Times said, "This heartwarming Christmas tale contains a western twist as it tells the tale of a heavenly cowpoke who rides down to earth to ride herd on a few people in need of some miracles."

== Cast ==
- Mark Miller as Gabe Sweet
- Slim Pickens as the cowboy angel
- Barbara Stanger as Teresa

== Production ==
Parts of the film were shot in Utah County and Salt Lake City, Utah.

== See also ==
- List of Christmas films
- List of films about angels
