= Old Oklahoma Plains =

1952 film by William Witney

- Theatrical release poster
- Directed by: William Witney
- Screenplay by: Milton Raison
- Story by: Albert DeMond
- Produced by: Edward J. White
- Starring: Rex Allen; Slim Pickens; Elaine Edwards; Roy Barcroft; John Crawford; Joel Marston
- Cinematography: John MacBurnie
- Edited by: Tony Martinelli
- Music by: Stanley Wilson
- Production company: Republic Pictures
- Distributed by: Republic Pictures
- Release date: July 25, 1952
- Running time: 60 minutes
- Country: United States
- Language: English

Old Oklahoma Plains is a 1952 American Western film directed by William Witney and written by Milton Raison. The film stars Rex Allen, Slim Pickens, Elaine Edwards, Roy Barcroft, John Crawford and Joel Marston. The film was released on July 25, 1952, by Republic Pictures.

== Cast ==
- Rex Allen as Rex Allen
- Koko as Koko
- Slim Pickens as Slim
- Elaine Edwards as Terry Ramsey
- Roy Barcroft as Arthur Jensen
- John Crawford as Chuck Ramsey
- Joel Marston as Lieutenant Spike Connors
- Russell Hicks as Colonel Charles Bigelow
- Fred Graham as Henchman Cameron
- Stephen Chase as General William Parker
- The Republic Rhythm Riders as Cowhands
