= A Ballad of the West =

Bobby Bridger

Box set by Bobby Bridger
- Released: 2000
- Recorded: Timberjack Joe's Tipi, Denver Sound Studios and Hill On The Moon Studios, 17–25 July 1975, 18–19 March 2000, and 4–6 April 2000.
- Genre: Folk, acoustic, historical
- Label: White Coyote Music, ASCAP

A Ballad of the West is a three-part story by Bobby Bridger told in Homeric verse and song about the Mountain Men, William F. "Buffalo Bill" Cody, and the Lakota Sioux people inspired by John G. Neihardt's A Cycle of the West.

Part One: Seekers of the Fleece: This ballad presents the life story of mountain man Jim Bridger and the Fur Trade Era. Jim Bridger is Bobby Bridger's great granduncle. Beginning with Jim Bridger's historic ascension of the Missouri River with the Ashely-Henry Expedition in 1822, Seekers of the Fleece tells of the initial interactions between Euro-Americans and Native Americans, as well as the beginning of the American Emigration Era and the Indian Wars. This ballad was inspired by Alfred Jacob Miller's Western watercolors.

Part Two: Pahaska: Pahaska is the Lakota word for "long hair," what the Sioux fondly called William F. "Buffalo Bill" Cody, and subsequently the name of the second ballad in the trilogy. Beginning with Buffalo Bill's birth in 1846, Pahaska chronicles Buffalo Bill's adventurous boyhood on the Great Plains, his career as a Pony Express rider, buffalo hunter, army scout, and his rise to global celebrity with the creation of the Wild West Show. Bobby Bridger also wrote a biography on Buffalo Bill recently published by the University of Texas Press, titled Buffalo Bill and Sitting Bull: Inventing the Wild West.

Part Three: Lakota: Lakota begins with the meeting of Nebraska epic poet, John Neihardt, and the Lakota Holy Man, Black Elk, in South Dakota in 1931, of which would bring the famous book Black Elk Speaks. A 'telling of a telling of a telling,' Lakota presents Black Elk's recollections to Neihardt of the Indian Wars Era (1860–1890), Red Cloud and the Fetterman Massacre, the Battle of Little Big Horn, the deaths of Crazy Horse and Sitting Bull, travels with Buffalo Bill's Wild West Show, and the Massacre at Wounded Knee.

A Ballad of the West was partially recorded in a tipi in the Colorado Rockies and completed in a 24 track studio in Denver in 1975 with Slim Pickens and The Lost Gonzo Band: John and Jim Inmon, Bob Livingston, Gary P. Nunn and Donnie Dolan. Slim's love of the mountain men brought him to volunteer his talents to narrate Seekers of the Fleece. Bridger has been performing A Ballad of the West around the globe for nearly four decades as a one-man show.

== See also ==
- Slim Pickens
