= Mark Miller (actor) =

American actor (1924–2022)

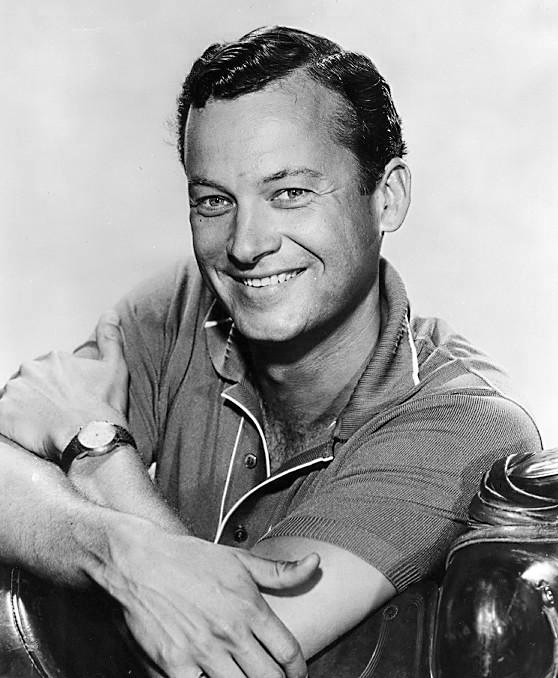
- Miller in 1960
- Born: Claude Herbert Miller Jr. November 20, 1924; Houston, Texas, U.S.
- Died: September 9, 2022 (aged 97); Santa Monica, California, U.S.
- Occupations: Actor; director; producer; screenwriter
- Years active: 1953–2022
- Spouses: Beatrice Hudson Ammidown (m. 1959; div. 1975) Barbara Stanger Miller (m. 1976; div. 1998)
- Children: 4, including Penelope Ann Miller

Mark Miller (born Claude Herbert Miller Jr.; November 20, 1924 – September 9, 2022) was an American stage and television actor and writer who starred in over 30 plays and made more than 40 appearances in television programs and films from 1953 onwards. He is best known for his roles as Bill Hooten in Guestward, Ho!, as Jim Nash in the Please Don't Eat the Daisies TV series, and as Alvie in the movie he wrote and produced, Savannah Smiles.

== Early life and career ==
Miller was born in Houston, Texas. He graduated from New York's American Academy of Dramatic Arts in 1952. After graduation, he was immediately cast in the revival of The Philadelphia Story in Newport, Rhode Island, at the Casino Playhouse and began a long-lasting career acting on stage and in television. He co-starred with Joanne Dru and J. Carrol Naish in the 1960–61 ABC sitcom Guestward, Ho!, the story of a New York City family named "Hooten" who relocates to New Mexico to operate a dude ranch.

Miller guest-starred in numerous series, including NBC's Western The Tall Man, with Barry Sullivan and Clu Gulager. He had a role in the film Youngblood Hawke (1964), and appeared on Jack Lord's ABC rodeo adventure series, Stoney Burke.

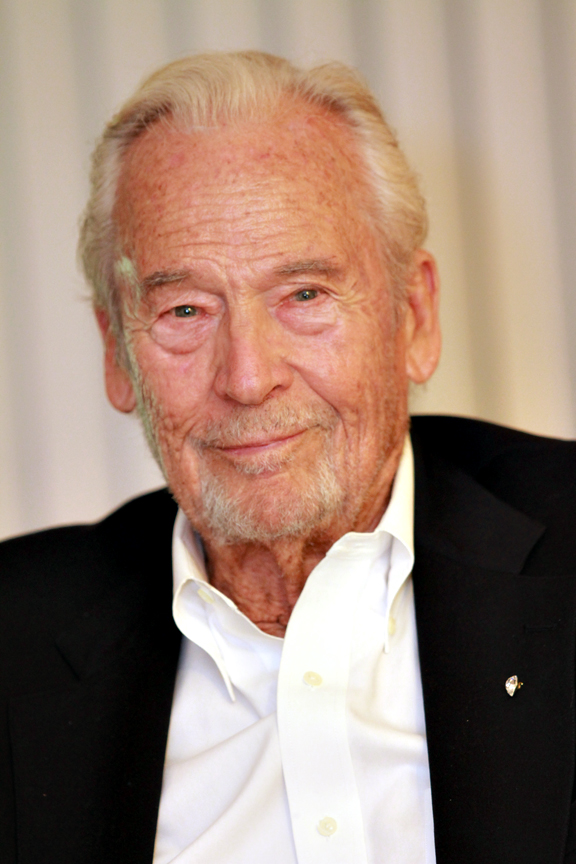
Miller in 2015, aged 90

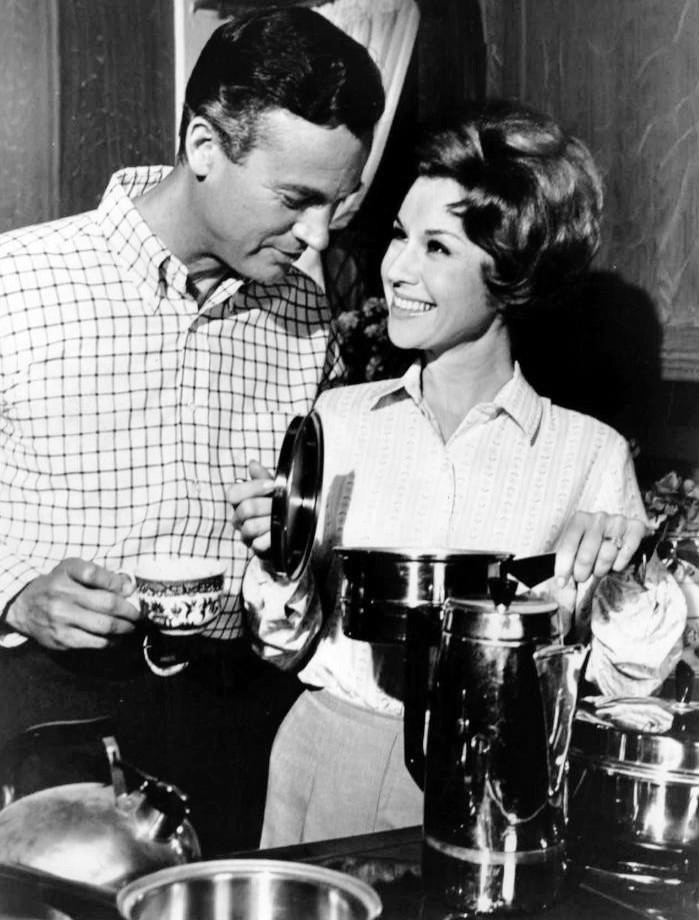
Miller and Pat Crowley in Please Don't Eat the Daisies (1966)

From 1965-67 through 58 episodes, he portrayed college professor Jim Nash, the leading role opposite Patricia Crowley, on the NBC-MGM television sitcom Please Don't Eat the Daisies, loosely based on the theatrical film starring Doris Day and David Niven.

He played various roles in numerous other television shows, including The Millionaire, Gunsmoke, Marcus Welby, M.D., The Andy Griffith Show, Adam-12, General Hospital and I Dream Of Jeannie. From 1969 to 1970, Miller played the role of sidekick Ross Craig in NBC's The Name of the Game. He starred in a 1962 episode of Alfred Hitchcock Presents titled "Apex" in which he plays a philandering husband intent on killing his wife. In 1973, he appeared in the episode "Death by Prescription" of Lorne Greene's ABC crime drama Griff.

The following year, he wrote, produced, and appeared in the film Ginger in the Morning, starring Sissy Spacek. He appeared in the feature films Mr. Sycamore (1975) and Dixie Dynamite (1976).

Miller produced and starred in the 1982 movie Savannah Smiles, for which he also wrote the story and screenplay. He starred alongside Slim Pickens in Christmas Mountain (1981).

Miller retired from Hollywood in the late 1990s and moved to Taos, New Mexico, with his second wife, Barbara Stanger. In 2010, he wrote the play Amorous Crossings that starred Loretta Swit and premiered at the Alhambra Theater in Jacksonville, Florida. The play ran for four weeks to sold-out audiences. In 2014, he moved back to Los Angeles, California, where he formed the production company Gypsy Moon Entertainment, and he continued to write and sell screenplays.

== Personal life and death ==
In December 1959, Miller married costume designer and publicist Beatrice Hudson Ammidown, daughter of architect Henry Philip Ammidown and Beatrice Hudson Embiricos. The couple had three daughters together: Marisa, Penelope Ann, and Savannah Miller. The two older girls both became actors. The curly blonde hair of youngest daughter Savannah gave Miller the initial idea for Savannah Smiles, and she ended up having a small role in it, as well. The couple divorced in 1975.

Miller remarried in 1976, to actress Barbara Stanger. The two co-wrote the screenplay for the 1995 film A Walk in the Clouds, starring Keanu Reeves and Anthony Quinn, and directed by Alfonso Arau. The couple divorced in 1998. Miller had six grandchildren.

Miller died of natural causes in Santa Monica, California, on September 9, 2022, at the age of 97.

== Filmography ==
| Year | Title | Role | Notes |
|---|---|---|---|
| 1957 | Blonde in Bondage | Larry Brand | |
| 1959 | Gunsmoke | Frank Paris | Season 4, episode 28: "Wind" |
| 1962 | Alfred Hitchcock Presents | Claude Shorup | Season 7, episode 24: "Apex" |
| 1963 | The Hook | Lieutenant D.D. Troy | |
| 1964 | Youngblood Hawke | Ross Hodge | |
| 1965-1966 | Please Don't Eat the Daisies | Jim Nash | |
| 1969-1970 | The Name of the Game | Ross Craig | |
| 1973 | The Streets Of San Francisco | Benson | Season 2 Episode 8: "No Badge For Benjy” |
| 1974 | Ginger in the Morning | Charlie | Also executive producer and writer |
| 1975 | Mr. Sycamore | Reverend Fletcher | |
| 1976 | Dixie Dynamite | Tom Eldridge | |
| 1981 | Christmas Mountain | Gabe Sweet | Also writer |
| 1982 | Savannah Smiles | Alvin "Alvie" Gibbs | Also producer and writer |
