= Donovan Scott =

American character actor (born 1947)

- Born: September 29, 1947 (age 78); Chico, California, U.S.
- Education: American Conservatory Theater
- Occupation: Character actor
- Years active: 1974–present

Donovan Scott (born September 29, 1947) is an American character actor best known for his role as cadet Leslie Barbara in the 1984 film Police Academy, in which he was part of an ensemble cast, as well as appearing as Santa Claus in numerous films.

== Biography ==
Scott was born on 26 September 1947 in Chico, California.

He studied for two and a half years at the American Conservatory Theater in San Francisco and trained in Comedia dell'Arte with Carlo Mazzone-Clementi. He toured as both an actor and artistic director of a theatrical troupe.

n 1977, Scott settled in Los Angeles and worked extensively in both film and television. In 1979, he made his film debut in Steven Spielberg's 1941. His likeness to Oliver Hardy in the film Sheena has been noted. Scott also appeared in the music video for Olivia Newton-John's 1981 hit "Physical", and co-starred in Lucille Ball's 1986 ABC-TV series Life with Lucy.

From 1993 to 1994 Scott stayed in Russia and Ukraine (Crimea) where he made The Children of Captain Grant as film director, screenwriter and actor. In 2016, Scott told San Diego Gay and Lesbian News he was working with his improv group at the ACME Comedy Theatre in Los Angeles, as well as working on "a Santa script" for television.

== Filmography ==
Year	Title	Role	Notes
1979	Presenting Susan Anton	Regular	TV series
1979	Laverne & Shirley	Rollo	Episode: "Fat City Holiday"
1979	1941	Kid Sailor	
1980	The Great Cash Giveaway Getaway	Minister	TV movie
1980	Popeye	Castor Oyl	
1981	The Incredible Shrinking Woman	Neighbor	
1981	Zorro, The Gay Blade	Paco the mute servant	
1982	Olivia Newton-John: Let's Get Physical	Guy getting powdered by Olivia	TV movie
1982	Savannah Smiles	Boots "Bootsie" McGaffee	
1982	Scared Silly	Skip Midler	TV movie
1982–1985	Faerie Tale Theatre	Guest Interviewee/Herman Todd/Cubby Bear/Hendrix/The French Chef	4 episodes
1983	The Lost Satellite	Various	TV series
1984	Police Academy	Cadet Leslie Barbara	
1984	Slapstick Studio	Himself	TV series
1984	Sheena	Fletcher "Fletch" Agronsky	
1985–1986	Tall Tales & Legends	Man in the Moon/Joe	2 episodes
1986	Trapper John, M.D.	Marty Calwood	Episode: "Heart and Seoul"
1986	The Best of Times	Eddie	
1986	Remington Steele	Vincent Dowd	Episode: "Steele Alive and Kicking"
1986	Psycho III	Kyle	
1986	Life with Lucy	Leonard Stoner	13 episodes
1988	Splash, Too	Freddie Bauer	TV movie, part of The Magical World of Disney
1988	Wizard of Speed and Time	Prisoner	
1988	Great Performances	The Tour Guide	Episode: "Tales from the Hollywood Hills – The Old Reliable"
1989	Meet the Hollowheads	Cop No. 2	
1989	Knots Landing	Owner	Episode: "Down Came the Rain and Washed the Spider Out: Part 2"
1990	Freddy's Nightmares	Jake Hopchick	Episode: "Prime Cut"
1990	Back to the Future Part III	Strickland's Deputy	
1991	Crazies	Robber with a frog	
1993	The Alaska Kid	Shorty/Blackbeard	13 episodes
1996	Homeboys in Outer Space	Petery Barnum	Episode: "Dog Day Afternoon, or When the Going Gets Ruff"
1996	The Children of Captain Grant	Willie	
1997	Babylon 5	Captain Jack	Episode: "Racing Mars"
1997	You're Invited to Mary-Kate & Ashley's Christmas Party	Santa Claus	
1998	Family Attraction	Bob	Short film
1999	Blast from the Past	Ron	
1999	Martial Law	George Calvin	Episode: "Thieves Among Thieves"
2000	Frasier	Santa	Episode: "Mary Christmas"
2001	Providence	Himself	Episode: "Impulse Control"
2002	Fish Don't Blink	Leonard	
2003	Uh-Oh!	Captain Squid	
2004	Police Academy – Behind Academy Doors: Secret Files Revealed	Himself	
2005	Boston Legal	Judge Christopher Serra	Episode: "Death Be Not Proud"
2005	I Love the '80s 3-D	Himself	1 episode
2006	The Enigma with a Stigma	Robert Riley	
2006	I Love the '70s: Volume 2	Himself	1 episode
2007	I Know Who Killed Me	Sheriff Leon Cardero	
2007	Bones	Santa Larry	Episode: "The Santa in the Slush"
2008	My Name Is Earl	Therapist	Episode: "Reading Is a Funda Mental Case"
2009	It's Always Sunny in Philadelphia	Santa Claus in Mall	Episode: "A Very Sunny Christmas"
2009	The Middle	Santa Claus	2 episodes
2009	The Three Gifts	Santa Claus	TV movie
2010	Backlight	Old Farmer	
2010	Zeke and Luther	Santa	Episode: "Bro-Ho-Ho"
2010	The Psycho Legacy	Himself	
2011	Eagleheart	Cyrus Barnaby	Episode: "Me Llamo Justice"
2011	3 Holiday Tails	Michael	TV movie
2012	Matchmaker Santa	Chris	TV movie
2013	Santa Switch	Santa	TV movie
2013	Baby Daddy	Santa Claus	Episode: "Emma's First Christmas"
2014	Klaus	Santa	Episode: "Santa"
2014–2015	Panske & McShane	Santa	2 episodes
2015	Death to Cupid	Santa Claus	Short film
2015	Northpole: Open for Christmas	Santa	TV movie
2015	Life in Pieces	Santa	Episode: "College Stealing Santa Caroling"
2016	Superstore	Tom	Episode: "Seasonal Help"
2016	Sleigh Bells Ring	Mr. Winter	TV movie
2016	Days of Our Lives	Santa	1 episode
2017	Somerville	Scotty	TV series
TBA	Y'All-R Family	Virgil Boudreaux	Episode: "Corona – Not Just a Beer"
TBA	What an Institution: The Story of Police Academy	Himself	Post-production
