= Big Bad John (film) =

1990 American Western film by Burt Kennedy

- Theatrical release poster
- Directed by: Burt Kennedy
- Written by: Joseph Berry; Burt Kennedy; C.B. Wismar (story)
- Based on: "Big Bad John" by Jimmy Dean
- Produced by: Red Steagall
- Starring: Jimmy Dean; Ned Beatty; Jack Elam; Romy Windsor; Bo Hopkins
- Cinematography: Ken Lamkin
- Edited by: John W. Wheeler
- Music by: Ken Sutherland
- Production company: Thunderhead Productions
- Distributed by: Red River Films
- Release date: February 1, 1990
- Running time: 92 minutes
- Country: United States
- Language: English

Big Bad John is a 1990 American Western film directed by Burt Kennedy. It stars Ned Beatty and Jimmy Dean, the latter of whom wrote and performed the song the film is based upon.

== Cast ==
- Ned Beatty as Charlie Mitchelle
- Jimmy Dean as Cletus Morgan
- Jack Elam as Jake Calhoun
- Doug English as John "Big Bad John" Tyler
- Bo Hopkins as Lester
- Romy Windsor as Marie Mitchelle
- Jeff Osterhage as Alvin Mahoney
- Ned Vaughn as Billy Mahoney
- Buck Taylor as Bob Simmons
- Amzie Strickland as Nellie
- Jerry Potter as Blany
- Red Steagall as Monahan
- Dan Kamin as Jacque (credited as Dan Kamin)
- Anne Lockhart as Lady Police Officer

== Production ==
The film was shot in Marshall, Texas.

== Reception ==
Leonard Maltin described the film as a "Dumb movie based on the long-ago hit song" while Veva Vonler found it was "a good-ol '- boy movie".
