= Ginger in the Morning =

1974 film by Gordon Wiles

- Directed by: Gordon Wiles
- Written by: Mark Miller
- Produced by: Mark Miller; Barbara Singer; Clark L. Paylow
- Starring: Sissy Spacek; Monte Markham
- Cinematography: William K. Jurgensen
- Edited by: Chuck McClelland
- Music by: Don McGinnis
- Production company: Kyma-Circle Productions
- Distributed by: Trans-America Video
- Release date: March 5, 1974
- Running time: 90 minutes
- Country: United States
- Language: English

Ginger in the Morning (also titled: Pick up the Pieces) is a 1974 American film, starring Sissy Spacek as a hitchhiker. It is the third theatrical film for Spacek, and the first American film appearance of Fred Ward.

The film was later released on home video by Troma Entertainment.

== Plot ==
Joe, a middle-aged executive driving home from the airport, still smarting from a recent divorce, picks up Ginger, a much younger, pretty hitchhiker with a guitar and a suitcase full of poetry books. Ginger speaks her mind and has a tender, joyful spirit. She is going to Colorado Springs, so Joe pretends he's going to Denver, when he actually lives in Santa Fe. When they need a place to stop over that night, they cannot find a motel room. Joe drives to his house, but pretends it belongs to a friend who is out of town and offered to let Joe use the house.

Joe is clearly taken with Ginger and she finds Joe is willing, if clumsily, to sing and run with her and listen to ideas for a better life. Joe's little white lies soon fall apart as Ginger gives him a foot bath and chest rub to recover from a chill. No matter. The two have fallen for each other.

It looks to be a very romantic night until Joe's best buddy and wild man Charlie shows up unexpectedly. In his raucous jesting, unaware that Ginger is listening from upstairs, Charlie frames Joe as someone just looking for a hot night with a pretty babe. Ginger's trust in Joe is shattered. She wants to leave for the bus station right then and there. Joe is in despair and cannot express his underlying sincerity to Ginger. But Charlie is a good man at heart, sees the harm he's done, and convinces a reluctant Ginger to at least stay the night. Joe cannot find his way to a productive course of action and instead, in retribution, recruits Charlie's ex-wife Sugar to come over and make Charlie's night a nightmare.

The four characters go out for dinner, where alcohol and latent fury between Charlie and Sugar result in ejection from the restaurant and near arrest of the two men. Things don't improve back at Joe's house, where Ginger reveals she is pregnant with a former boyfriend's child, and the two women leave to stay at a hotel. Joe and Charlie drive to the mountains where Joe wrestles with the idea of making a commitment to Ginger and her unborn child. All four eventually end up back at Joe's house, where Joe still cannot break through his crisis of non-commitment. Ginger declares it's over and leaves for the bus station.

In the final scenes of the movie, Joe becomes alarmed at his missed opportunity, and gets the town sheriff to chase and stop the bus Ginger is on. Once on the bus, Joe cannot convince Ginger to reconsider, so when the driver pulls over he gets off along with some other passengers. But after the bus pulls away, he sees Ginger standing on the other side of the road.

== Cast ==
Actor	Role
Sissy Spacek	Ginger
Susan Oliver	Sugar
Monte Markham	Joe
Mark Miller	Charlie
David Doyle	Fred
Slim Pickens	Sheriff
Fred Ward	Truck Driver
Marion Charles	Diane

== Themes, Tropes, and Genres ==
Ginger in the Morning explores themes of romance and personal rediscovery. Ginger has been characterized as a manic pixie dream girl whose main purpose is to inspire or revitalize Joe, who's at a low ebb since his divorce.

J. Paul Johnson remarks that while "there are moments when" the film "looks and feels very much like a generic Seventies sexploitation film", it is "surprisingly sweet and unexpected" with no sex "and nearly no discussion of it at all."

== Production ==
Ginger in the Morning was a low-budget, small-scale B-movie. Louis Hexter, a Dallas-based investor, in making his first foray into filmmaking, received the first-ever onscreen credit of "financier" credit for the film. Mark Miller defended the financier's right to take a credit, likening Hexter's function on the film to that of a studio.

Shooting took place in Albuquerque starting on March 6, 1972. It was shot with a video camera and later transferred to film.

== Release ==
The film premiered on March 5, 1974 in a limited theatrical release, with Mark Miller scheduled to appear at the Albuquerque opening as well as Dallas where he would be joined by Sissy Spacek. Following Spacek's Oscar for her performance in Coal Miner's Daughter (1980), the home video release of Ginger in the Morning surged in popularity, and several foreign markets expressed interest in theatrical rights.

A 50th anniversary limited edition remastered version on Blu-ray disc was released by Film Masters on December 17, 2024, billed as "an exclusive new 4K restoration of the film from the original camera negative." Special features include a newly recorded 18-minute interview with 89-year-old Monte Markham reflecting on the production and his career more broadly, audio commentary, and a booklet insert with an essay by Susan King on Spacek. The commentary is by film historians C. Courtney Joyner and Amanda Reyes.

== Reception ==
Johnson calls Spacek's Ginger "wan and sweet," and "completely convincing," while Markham's Joe is "creditable and "nuanced": but for the "egregiously awful subplot involving Joe's rowdy friend Charlie (paid, apparently, by the mouthfuls of scenery he thinks he has to chew) and his ex-wife Sugar... Ginger in the Morning would make for a perfectly pleasant affair... a lovely curio from the decade."

Derek Winnert gives the film two stars, citing good performances, "especially from the young Spacek", which "make a meal" of Mark Miller's "modestly engaging if unsurprising dialogue."

== See also ==
- List of American films of 1974
