= Mr. Deeds Goes to Town (TV series) =

- Genre: Sitcom
- Based on: Mr. Deeds Goes to Town
- Developed by: Harry Ackerman; Bernard Slade
- Starring: Monte Markham; Pat Harrington, Jr.
- Country of origin: United States
- Original language: English
- No. of seasons: 1
- No. of episodes: 17 (1 unaired) (list of episodes)

Production
- Camera setup: Multi-camera
- Running time: 30 minutes
- Production company: Screen Gems

Original release
- Network: ABC
- Release: September 26, 1969 – January 16, 1970

Mr. Deeds Goes to Town is an American sitcom that aired on ABC from September 26, 1969, to January 16, 1970. It was loosely based on the 1936 film of the same name.

== Premise ==
A small town newspaper editor inherits a large corporation in Manhattan. He then tries to correct problems that his unscrupulous uncle had caused.

== Cast ==
- Monte Markham as Longfellow Deeds
- Pat Harrington, Jr. as Tony Lawrence
- Herb Voland as Henry Masterson
- Ivor Barry as George, the butler
- Kathryn Hays as Sheila Templeton

== Episodes ==
No.	Title	Directed by	Written by	Original release date
1	"Pilot"	Frank Capra	Unknown	September 26, 1969
When Mr. Deeds suddenly becomes wealthy, he is overrun by the greedy.
2	"The Education of Longfellow Deeds"	Unknown	Unknown	October 3, 1969
In order to learn more about high finance, Deeds goes to night school.
3	"The Wonderful Old Saloon"	Unknown	Unknown	October 10, 1969
Deeds' own corporation is about to destroy his favorite saloon.
4	"Sparkling Spring"	Unknown	Unknown	October 17, 1969
Deeds goes on a crusade against pollution in air and water.
5	"The Pixilated Man"	Unknown	Unknown	October 24, 1969
A TV columnist tries to make it appear as if Deeds is mentally ill.
6	"Once Again a Star"	Unknown	Unknown	October 31, 1969
Deeds decides to help a fading film star of whom he's an admirer.
7	"Industrial Spy"	Unknown	Unknown	November 7, 1969
In order to get back a $6 million paint formula that was stolen from his company, Deeds forms a gang.
8	"Wedding Bells for Deeds"	Unknown	Unknown	November 14, 1969
When Mr. Deeds promises to help a hometown girl, he gets nothing but trouble.
9	"There's One Born Every Thirty Years"	Unknown	Unknown	November 21, 1969
Deeds helps a young lady swindle Deeds Enterprises.
10	"The Improbable Mr. Deeds"	Unknown	Unknown	November 28, 1969
An artist wants to straighten out Deeds.
11	"A Ransom in Small Unmarked Flowers"	Unknown	Unknown	December 5, 1969
Deeds gets kidnapped by a group of young abductors, but he ends up helping them because they know nothing about kidnapping.
12	"The Howdy Syndrome"	Unknown	Unknown	December 12, 1969
After coming to the conclusion that his employees have become too computerized, he campaigns to have them meet and greet each other.
13	"The Revolt of the Bucket Brigade"	Unknown	Unknown	December 19, 1969
The cleaning crew revolts against Deeds Enterprises, with the help of Mr. Deeds.
14	"Touching is Believing"	Unknown	Unknown	December 26, 1969
A new romantic interest (Susan Oliver) becomes a business foe for Masterson.
15	"The Marriage Saver"	Unknown	Unknown	January 9, 1970
Deeds tries to save a crumbling marriage.
16	"Tricks of the Trade"	Unknown	Unknown	January 16, 1970
A pretty girl (Kristina Holland) is the bait to get Deeds to hire a motivational research outfit.
17	"Tarnished Armor"	TBD	TBD	UNAIRED
