= Judgement Day (1988 film) =

- VHS cover art
- Directed by: Ferde Grofé Jr.
- Written by: Ferde Grofé Jr.
- Produced by: Ferde Grofé Jr. Keith Lawrence
- Starring: Kenneth McLeod; David Anthony Smith; Monte Markham; Gloria Hayes; Peter Mark Richman; Cesar Romero
- Distributed by: Magnum Entertainment; Starmaker Entertainment
- Release date: 1988
- Running time: 93 minutes
- Country: United States
- Language: English

Judgement Day (also known as The Third Hand) is a 1988 American horror film written and directed by Ferde Grofé Jr. and starring Ken McLeod, David Anthony Smith, Monte Markham, Peter Mark Richman, and Cesar Romero.

Judgment Day was Romero's last film appearance to be released in his lifetime. His next film appearance, The Right Way, would occur in 1998, four years after his death.

== Plot ==
Charlie and Pete, two American backpackers in Mexico, are led to the isolated town of Santana after their bus breaks down by a mysterious old woman wearing a black shroud. In town, they meet fellow displaced American Enrique Samuel "Sam" Flaherty who bartends at a local restaurant. He tells them a local legend about how the founder of Santana saved its population from a plague by outwitting the Devil. The people were spared but the Devil cursed the town and returns once a year for one day with his legion of demons to roam the streets and have his revenge. Peter and Charlie are invited to leave with Sam and his daughter, knowing the entire town including lodgings will be empty. When Sam's daughter, Angela, gets trapped playing hide-and-seek, Sam goes to the local priest, Father Dominic, whom is a close friend. Dominic regretfully says he cannot help but Sam implies he knows about Dominic's dark past and will remain in town to find his daughter even if he has to "face Him."

At the last minute, Pete and Charlie attempt to leave but after nightfall a storm forces them to look for shelter. Hooded demons carrying torches, whips, and halberds begin leading captives through the streets. Almost running into some, the duo are welcomed into a mansion by a man named Octavio, his servant Martin, and daughter Maria. Their safety is insured as long as they remain and Pete becomes smitten with Maria. Charlie does not want to stay and goes back into the streets, where he runs into Sam, still searching for his daughter. He warns Charlie to get out of town or face "the one with the third hand." Charlie returns to Octavio and demands answers. Meanwhile, Maria has seduced Pete and tells him he has seen her somewhere before: the broken down bus. Octavio tells the legend of Santana, revealing that he was the conquistador who founded the town. He and Maria accepted eternal exile in their safe haven while the Devil and his minions roam free. Anyone who stays in town during the Devil's 24-hour presence will be trapped unless they escape at dawn.

Pete decides to leave with Charlie and they see Sam, beaten and being led in ranks with others to the Devil's altar. There they witness Sam, among others, mounted to crucifixes before the Devil who burns his third hand print on their bodies. They find Sam after and, with his dying breath, asks Charlie to give Dominic a message. The two are discovered and chased into the streets. Pete allows them to follow him while Charlie doubles back to meet him at Octavio's but the mansion is locked. Hearing the church bell for dawn, Charlie runs out of the city and collapses in a field. In the morning, he is awakened by Angela. Charlie goes to Father Dominic and gives him Sam's message: forgiveness and thanks for keeping his word to take his life in exchange for Angela's. Dominic reveals that he is the one cursed to wear the glove of the Devil. His fate befell him when he bargained for his sister, whom Sam married, to be given a merciful death when she became trapped in Santana years ago. Dominic hopes he will die before the next year, not wanting to endure his curse any further. Charlie wonders who would wear the Devil's glove and Dominic ominously tells him that is Satan's choice.

One year later, Charlie has been running Sam's restaurant and taking care of Angela. A man hired by Pete's parents arrives looking for him. Charlie tells him he will be meeting up with Pete later. After nightfall, Charlie goes directly to Octavio's mansion so the two can escape. Pete says he is happy to see Charlie as the gates open and the Devil stands before him. Hooded demons grab Charlie and drag him to his fate while the Devil's minions roam the streets of Santana.

== Cast ==
- Kenneth McLeod as Charlie Manners
- David Anthony Smith as Pete Johnson
- Monte Markham as Sam
- Peter Mark Richman as Father Dominic
- Cesar Romero as Octavio
