= The Third Hand (film) =

1981 Hong Kong film by Chu Mu

- Directed by: Chu Mu
- Starring: Lam Fai-wong; Jamie Luk; Lam Yeung-yeung; Dick Wei
- Production company: Shaw Brothers
- Release date: 1981
- Country: Hong Kong
- Language: Cantonese

The Third Hand (第三隻手) is a 1981 Hong Kong adult film directed by Chu Mu.

Known as The Extra Hand as a tentative title, director Chu Mu says it cannot be explained in a few words and one has to see the film.

== Plot ==
The story begins with a bed in an apartment on which lies a corpse. The owner of the apartment sells the furniture to a furniture company, after which the bed is then sold to Ah Keung (Lam Pei-huang) and Ah Ping (Luk Kim-min) who discover there is a roll of money hidden inside, and this results in each thinking up ways of keeping the money.

However, later the wife of Ah Keung's boss (Lin Yang Yang) has sex with Ah Keung on the bed at the very time that another man Chiang Pui (To Lung) is attempting to gain entry into the house by way of a water pipe. After watching through the window at the antics on the bed, which he finds most entertaining, a hand emerges from beneath the bed, and Chiang Pui becomes so afraid that he falls from the water-pipe.

== Cast ==
- Wong Nap-si
- Wang Han-chen
- Lai Qui
- Sa Sa
- Mak Wa-mei
- Lam Yang Yang as Lady Boss
- Lau Fong-sai
- Yue Wing
- Luk Kim-min as Ah Ping
- Lam Pei-huang as Ah Keung
- To Lung as Chiang Pui
