= Slim Pickens =

American rodeo performer and actor (1919–1983)

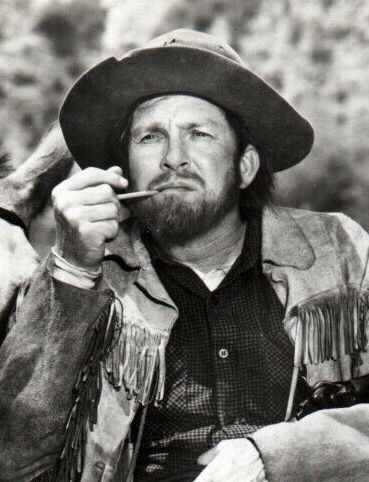
- Pickens in a publicity photo for Custer (1967)
- Born: Louis Burton Lindley Jr. June 29, 1919; Kingsburg, California, U.S.
- Died: December 8, 1983 (aged 64); Modesto, California, U.S.
- Occupations: Actor, rodeo performer
- Years active: 1946–1983
- Spouse: Margaret (née Harmon) Lindley (m. 1950)
- Children: 3

Louis Burton Lindley (June 29, 1919 – December 8, 1983), better known by his stage name Slim Pickens, was an American actor and rodeo performer. Starting off in the rodeo, Pickens took up acting, and appeared in dozens of movies and TV shows. For much of his career, Pickens played cowboy roles. He played comic roles in Dr. Strangelove, Blazing Saddles, 1941, and had a villainous role in One-Eyed Jacks with Marlon Brando.

== Early life and rodeo work ==
Louis Burton Lindley was born in Kingsburg, California, the son of Sally Mosher (née Turk) and Louis Bert Lindley, a Texas-born dairy farmer. Young Lindley was an excellent horse rider from an early age. Known as "Burt" to his family and friends, he grew bored with dairy farming and began to make a few dollars by riding broncos and roping steers in his early teens. His father found out and forbade this activity, but Lindley took no notice, went to compete in a rodeo, and was told by the doubtful rodeo manager that there would be "slim pickins" (i.e. little chance of any prize money) for him. To prevent his father from discovering that he had competed, he entered his name as Slim Pickens, and won $400 that afternoon.

Lindley graduated from Hanford High School (in Hanford) and was a member of the Future Farmers of America. He joined the rodeo, billed as Slim Pickens, and eventually became a well-known rodeo clown. During World War II, he enlisted in the U.S. Army Air Forces. Reportedly when the recruiter asked him his profession, Lindley responded "rodeo"; this word misread on a form as "radio," he spent his entire enlistment at a radio station in the Midwest.

== Film career ==
After nearly 20 years' rodeo work, Pickens's wide eyes, moon face, strong physical presence, and distinctive country drawl gained him a role in the Western Rocky Mountain (1950), which starred Errol Flynn. He appeared in many more Westerns, playing both villains and comic sidekicks to actors such as Rex Allen.

Hollywood made use of Pickens's rodeo background. He did not need a stand-in for horseback scenes, and he was able to gallop his own Appaloosa horses across the desert, or drive a stagecoach pulled by a six-horse team.

Pickens appeared in dozens more films, including Old Oklahoma Plains (1952), Down Laredo Way (1953), Tonka (1959), One-Eyed Jacks (1961, with Marlon Brando), Dr. Strangelove (1964), Major Dundee (1965, with Charlton Heston), In Harms Way (1965), a remake of Stagecoach (1966; Pickens played the driver, portrayed in the 1939 film by Andy Devine), An Eye for an Eye (1966), Never a Dull Moment (1968), The Cowboys (1972, with John Wayne), The Getaway (1972, with Steve McQueen), Pat Garrett and Billy the Kid (1973), Ginger in the Morning (1974, with Fred Ward), Blazing Saddles (1974), Poor Pretty Eddie, Rancho Deluxe (both 1975), Beyond the Poseidon Adventure (1979, with Michael Caine and Karl Malden), and Tom Horn (1980, also with McQueen). He had a small but memorable role in Steven Spielberg's 1941 (1979) in scenes with Toshiro Mifune and Christopher Lee; during one scene, he enumerates the objects on his person, similarly to the way he does in the "Survival Kit Contents Check" scene in Dr. Strangelove. In 1978, Pickens lent his voice to theme park Silver Dollar City as a character named Rube Dugan, for a ride called "Rube Dugan's Diving Bell". The diving bell was a simulation ride that took passengers on a journey to the bottom of Lake Silver and back. The ride was in operation from 1978 to 1984. He also played werewolf sheriff Sam Newfield in The Howling (1981).

In 1975, Pickens was in another Western, playing the evil, limping bank robber in Walt Disney's The Apple Dumpling Gang; that same year, the exploitation cult classic Poor Pretty Eddie was released, with Pickens portraying twisted Sheriff Orville. He provided the voice of B.O.B. in the 1979 Disney science-fiction thriller The Black Hole. His last film was Pink Motel (1982, with Phyllis Diller).

=== Dr. Strangelove ===
Pickens played B-52 pilot Major T. J. "King" Kong in 1964's Dr. Strangelove. Stanley Kubrick cast Pickens after Peter Sellers, who played three other roles in the film, sprained his ankle and was unable to perform in the role due to having to work in the cramped cockpit set. Kubrick felt that Pickens's accent and comic sense were perfect for the role of Kong, a cartoonishly patriotic and gung-ho B-52 commander. He was not given the script for the entire film, but only those portions in which he played a part. Several scenes featuring Pickens have been acclaimed. These include:

Slim Pickens as Major "King" Kong riding a nuclear bomb to oblivion in Dr. Strangelove

- Giving a monologue meant to steel his crew for their duty after he receives the definitive order to bomb a strategic target in the USSR.
- Reading aloud to his crew the contents of their survival kits: after listing the contents usable for barter with Russian women (including prophylactics—possibly the first mention of condoms in a Hollywood film—nylons, lipstick, and a M1911 pistol with ammunition), Major Kong says "Shoot, a fella could have a pretty good weekend in Vegas with all that stuff." This line has been re-dubbed, with a reference to a "weekend in Dallas" changed to a "weekend in Vegas" following President John F. Kennedy's assassination in Dallas: the scheduled November 22, 1963 screening for critics was also cancelled due to this event.
- Major Kong riding a dropped H-bomb to a certain death while whooping and waving his cowboy hat like a rodeo performer riding a bronco or a bull, not knowing that its detonation will trigger a Soviet doomsday device.

Pickens credited Dr. Strangelove as a turning point in his career. He later said, "After Dr. Strangelove, the roles, the dressing rooms, and the checks all started gettin' bigger." Pickens said he was amazed at the difference one movie could make. He also said that working with Stanley Kubrick proved too difficult due to Kubrick's perfectionist style of directing with multiple takes for nearly every shot, especially with the climactic H-bomb riding scene, which was done in just over 100 takes. In the late 1970s, Pickens was offered the part of Dick Hallorann in Kubrick's adaptation of Stephen King's The Shining, but stipulated that he would appear in the film only if Kubrick was required to shoot his scenes in fewer than 100 takes. Instead, Pickens's agent showed the script to Don Schwartz, the agent of Scatman Crothers, and Crothers accepted the role.

== Voice work and recordings ==
Pickens lent his voice to the 1975 studio recording of Bobby Bridger's collection of Western ballads A Ballad of the West, in which he narrated part 1, "Seekers of the Fleece", the story of Jim Bridger and the mountain man fur-trade era. In 1977, he released the self-titled country album, Slim Pickens, on Blue Canyon Records. The LP contained 12 selections (including Kinky Friedman's "Carryin' the Torch", which was issued as a single) and two songs written by Pickens. The record jacket featured a photograph of the actor in his signature role in Dr. Strangelove, sitting in the cockpit. Pickens also recorded a one-off single, "Christmas in November" (a song about a child who would not live to celebrate Christmas on time), on the Midsong label in 1980.

== Television ==
Pickens appeared in numerous television guest shots, including a 1954 Stories of the Century episode in which he played the Sundance Kid to Joe Sawyer's Butch Cassidy, as well as four episodes of the syndicated Western series Annie Oakley (1956, with Gail Davis and Brad Johnson), a 1956 episode of The Lone Ranger, and three episodes of NBC's Wide Country (1962), a rodeo series starring Earl Holliman and Andrew Prine. He appeared in the 1959-1960 Walt Disney Studios miniseries The Swamp Fox. In 1961, he had a recurring role as Johnson in the 17-episode NBC series The Americans, the story of how the American Civil War divided families. Thereafter, he was cast in a first-season episode of NBC's espionage series The Man from U.N.C.L.E..

He appeared in episodes of Mannix, Cheyenne, Sugarfoot, Alfred Hitchcock Presents, The Lone Ranger, Frontier Doctor, Gunsmoke, Route 66, The Tall Man, Maverick (in several episodes playing different characters), The Westerner, Riverboat, The Fugitive, The Travels of Jaimie McPheeters, The Legend of Jesse James, Alias Smith and Jones, Daniel Boone, The Virginian, Night Gallery, That Girl, Baretta, Vega$, How the West Was Won, Cimarron Strip, and Kung Fu.

Pickens was cast in recurring roles in Custer, Bonanza, Hee Haw (where he was a semiregular from 1981 until his death), B. J. and the Bear with Greg Evigan, and Filthy Rich. He played Wild Jack Monroe, the owner of station WJM, in CBS's The Mary Tyler Moore Show, and also guest-starred as Zeke in the 1963 episode "Higgins and the Hillbilly" of the ABC sitcom Our Man Higgins, which starred Stanley Holloway as a British butler for a suburban American family. Pickens portrayed Grandpa Scofield in a two-part 1980 episode of ABC's The Love Boat. In an episode of CBS's Hawaii Five-O, he portrayed the patriarch of a family of serial killers. Pickens emceed NBC's short-lived country music variety series The Nashville Palace in 1981.

== Awards ==
In 1982, Pickens was inducted into the Hall of Great Western Performers at the National Cowboy & Western Heritage Museum in Oklahoma City. In 1986, Pickens was honored by the Rodeo Historical Society during his posthumous induction into the Rodeo Hall of Fame at the National Cowboy & Western Heritage Museum.

In 2005, Pickens was posthumously inducted into the ProRodeo Hall of Fame in Colorado Springs for his work as a rodeo clown. In 2006, Pickens was inducted into the Pendleton Round-Up and Happy Canyon Hall of Fame in Pendleton, Oregon. In 2020, Pickens was inducted into the Ellensburg Rodeo Hall of Fame in Ellensburg, Washington.

== Final years and death ==
In his last years, Pickens lived with his wife in Columbia, California. He died in a hospital in Modesto on December 8, 1983, after surgery for a brain tumor. He was survived by his wife and children, Thomas Michael Lindley and Margaret Louise Wittman (née Lindley), as well as his stepdaughter he chose to raise as his own, Daryle Ann Giardino (née Lindley). His funeral was held at Presbyterian Church of the Forty Niners in Columbia, California, where he was a member. His ashes were scattered over his favorite trail areas. His wife died in 2011.

== Personal life ==
His brother Samuel (1921–2001) was also an actor with the stage name Easy Pickens. Slim was a longtime supporter of the National Rifle Association of America (NRA), appearing in promotional shots. He was an avid outdoorsman, appearing in several episodes of The American Sportsman.

== Cultural references ==
The album Days Go By (2012) by The Offspring features the song "Slim Pickens Does the Right Thing and Rides the Bomb to Hell" (Track 12, 2:36) which harkens back to his final scene from Dr. Strangelove.

== Filmography ==
- Smoky (1946) as Rodeo Cowboy, uncredited
- Rocky Mountain (1950) as Plank (CSA)
- Colorado Sundown (1952) as Joshua Slim Pickens / Ma Pickens
- The Last Musketeer (1952) as Slim Pickens
- Border Saddlemates (1952) as Slim Pickens
- The Story of Will Rogers (1952) as Dusty Donovan
- Old Oklahoma Plains (1952) as Slim
- South Pacific Trail (1952) as Slim Pickens
- Thunderbirds (1952) as Private Wes Shelby
- Old Overland Trail (1953) as Slim Pickens
- The Sun Shines Bright (1953) as Sterling, Lanky Backwoodsman
- Iron Mountain Trail (1953) as Slim Pickens
- Down Laredo Way (1953) as Slim
- Shadows of Tombstone (1953) as Slim
- Red River Shore (1953) as Deputy Slim Pickens
- Phantom Stallion (1954) as Slim
- The Boy from Oklahoma (1954) as Shorty
- The Outcast (1954) as Boone Polsen
- Santa Fe Passage (1955) as Sam Beekman
- The Last Command (1955) as Abe
- When Gangland Strikes (1956) as Slim Pickett
- Stranger at My Door (1956) as Ben Silas
- The Great Locomotive Chase (1956) as Pete Bracken
- Gun Brothers (1956) as Moose MacLain
- Gunsight Ridge (1957) as Hank Moss
- The Sheepman (1958) as Marshal
- Escort West (1958) as Corporal Wheeler
- Tonka (1958) as Ace
- Stump Run (1959) as Babe Gaskin
- Chartroose Caboose (1960) as Pete Harmon
- One-Eyed Jacks (1961) as Deputy Lon Dedrick
- A Thunder of Drums (1961) as Trooper Erschick
- Savage Sam (1963) as Willy Crup
- Dr. Strangelove (1964) as Major 'King' Kong
- Major Dundee (1965) as Wiley
- In Harm's Way (1965) as C.P.O Culpepper
- Up from the Beach (1965) as Artillery Colonel
- The Glory Guys (1965) as Sergeant James Gregory
- Stagecoach (1966) as Buck
- An Eye for an Eye (1966) as Ike Slant
- Un tipo dificil de matar (1967)
- Rough Night in Jericho (1967) as Yarbrough
- The Flim-Flam Man (1967) as Jarvis Bates
- Will Penny (1968) as Ike Walterstein
- Never a Dull Moment (1968) as Cowboy Schaeffer
- The Legend of Custer (1968) as California Joe Milner
- Skidoo (1968) as Switchboard Operator
- 80 Steps to Jonah (1969) as Scott
- Rosolino Paternò, soldato... (1970) as General Maxwell
- The Ballad of Cable Hogue (1970) as Ben Fairchild
- The Deserter (1970) as Tattinger, American Scout
- Temporada salvaje (1971) as Lucky
- The Cowboys (1972) as Anse
- J.C. (1972) as Grady Caldwell
- The Honkers (1972) as Clete
- The Getaway (1972) as Cowboy
- Pat Garrett and Billy the Kid (1973) as Sheriff Baker
- Blazing Saddles (1974) as Taggart
- Runaway on the Rogue River (1974) as Bucky Steele
- The Gun and the Pulpit (1974) as Billy One-Eye
- Bootleggers (1974) as Grandpa Pruitt
- Ginger in the Morning (1974) as Sheriff
- The Legend of Earl Durand (1974) as Phil Chumley
- Rancho Deluxe (1975) as Henry Beige
- Poor Pretty Eddie (1975) as Sheriff Orville
- The Apple Dumpling Gang (1975) as Frank Stillwell
- White Line Fever (1975) as Duane Haller
- Banjo Hackett: Roamin' Free (1976, TV movie) as Lijah Tuttle
- Hawmps! (1976) as Naman Tucker
- Pony Express Rider (1976) as Bob Jay
- Mr. Billion (1977) as Duane Hawkins
- The White Buffalo (1977) as Abel Pickney
- The Shadow of Chikara (1977) as Virgil Cane
- The Swarm (1978) as Jud Hawkins
- Smokey and the Good Time Outlaws (1978) as Sheriff Ledy
- The Sweet Creek County War (1979) as Jitters Pippen
- Beyond the Poseidon Adventure (1979) as Dewey 'Tex' Hopkins
- The Sacketts (1979) as Jack Bigelow
- 1941 (1979) as Hollis P. Wood
- Spirit of the Wind (1979) as Obie
- The Black Hole (1979) as B.O.B. (voice, uncredited)
- Tom Horn (1980) as Sheriff Sam Creedmore
- Honeysuckle Rose (1980) as Garland Ramsey
- Christmas Mountain (1981)
- The Howling (1981) as Sam Newfield
- This House Possessed (1981, TV movie) as Arthur Keene
- Pink Motel (1982) as Roy

=== Television ===
- The Lone Ranger (1956) (Season 5 Episode 2: "The Sheriff of Smoke Tree") — Joe Boley
- The Lone Ranger (1956) (Season 5 Episode 10: "The Letter Bride") — Ed Jones
- Sugarfoot (1957) (Season 1 Episode 1: "Brannigan's Boots") — Shorty
- Cheyenne (1957) (Season 2 Episode 14: "Big Ghost Basin") — Gary Owen
- Lassie (1957) (Season 3 Episode 22: "The Chimp") — Eddie
- Death Valley Days (1957 (Season 6 Episode 4: "Arsenic Springs") — Barfly (uncredited)
- Walt Disney's Wonderful World of Color (1957–1974) (19 episodes) — various roles
- Sugarfoot (1958) (Season 1 Episode 18: "Short Range") — Harry
- Death Valley Days (1958) (Season 6 Episode 21: "The Telescope Eye") — Wall Kennedy
- Wagon Train (1958) (Season 2 Episode 10: "The Tent City Story") — Rafe Jeffers
- Maverick (1958) (Season 2 Episode 14: "The Spanish Dancer") — Jed
- Frontier Doctor (1959) (Season 1 Episode 19: "Bittercreek Gang") — Slim
- Sugarfoot (1960) (Season 4 Episode 1: "The Shadow Catcher") — Mark
- Bronco (1961) (Season 4 Episode 3: "One Came Back") — 1st Stage Driver (uncredited)
- The Americans (1961) (Season 1 Episode 8: "The Escape") — Johnson
- The Americans (1961) (Season 1 Episode 15: "The War Between the States") — Johnson
- Maverick (1961) (Season 4 Episode 16: "A State of Siege") — Stagecoach Driver
- Maverick (1961) (Season 4 Episode 30: "Benefit of a Doubt") — Roscoe
- Alfred Hitchcock Presents (1961) (Season 6 Episode 36: "Final Arrangements") — Bradshaw
- Wagon Train (1962) (Season 6 Episode 12: "The Eve Newhope Story") — Grubstake Malloy
- Route 66 (1962) (Season 2 Episode 15: "A Long Piece of Mischief") — Jud
- Bonanza (1963) (Season 4 Episode 18: "Half a Rogue") — Big Jim Leyton
- The Virginian (1963) (Season 2 Episode 9: "Run Quiet") — Slim
- The Alfred Hitchcock Hour (1964) (Season 2 Episode 17: "The Jar") — Clem Carter
- Bonanza (1964) (Season 5 Episode 21: "King of the Mountain") — Big Jim Leyton
- Rawhide (1964) (Season 7 Episode 9: "The Backshooter") — Sheriff McKay
- The Fugitive (1964) (Season 2 Episode 5: "Nemesis") — Corbin
- Gunsmoke (1964) (Season 9 Episode 18: "Once a Haggen") — Bucko Taos
- The Virginian (1964) (Season 3 Episode 7: "Big Image... Little Man") — Hogy
- The Man from U.N.C.L.E. (1964) (Season 1 Episode 2: "The Iowa-Scuba Affair") — Clint Spinner
- Daniel Boone (1964 TV series) (1966) (Season 2 Episode 18: "The Deserter") — Simon Harman
- Daniel Boone (1964 TV series) (1966) (Season 3 Episode 1: "Dan'l Boone Shot a B'ar") — Cletus Mott
- Gunsmoke (1966) (Season 11 Episode 17: "Sweet Billy, Singer of Songs") — Pony Beal
- The Legend of Jesse James (1966) (Season 1 Episode 33: "Wanted: Dead and Only") — Sheriff Homer Brinks
- Cimarron Strip (1968) (Season 1 Episode 16: "Fool's Gold") — Malachi Grimes
- Gentle Ben (1968) (Season 1 Episode 28: "Ol' Joe's Gotta Go") — Lloyd Larkin
- Bonanza (1968) (Season 10 Episode 7: "Catch as Catch Can") — Sheriff Gant
- That Girl (1969) (Season 4 Episode 4: "Nobody Here But Us Chickens") — Major Culpepper
- Mannix (1969) (Season 2 Episode 15: "Only Giants Can Play") — Mike Ray
- Ironside (1969) (Season 3 Episode 2: "Goodbye to Yesterday") — Sheriff Metcalf
- Bonanza (1970) (Season 11 Episode 27: "What Are Pardners For?") — Sheriff
- Gunsmoke (1970) (Season 16 Episode 10: "The Scavengers") — Colley
- The Mary Tyler Moore Show (1971) (Season 1 Episode 24: "The 45-Year-Old Man") — Wild Jack Monroe
- The Virginian (1971) (Season 9 Episode 18: "The Angus Killer") — Sheriff
- Alias Smith and Jones (1971) (Season 1 Episode 3: "Exit from Wickenburg") — Mike
- Alias Smith and Jones (1971) (Season 1 Episode 10: "The Man Who Murdered Himself") — Sheriff Benton
- Alias Smith and Jones (1971) (Season 2 Episode 1: "The Day They Hanged Kid Curry") — Sheriff Whittaker
- The Partridge Family (1972) (Season 3 Episode 12: "Nag, Nag, Nag") — Will Fowler
- Gunsmoke (1972) (Season 18 Episode 1: "The River: Part 1") — Charlie Utter
- Gunsmoke (1972) (Season 18 Episode 2: "The River: Part 2") — Charlie Utter
- Alias Smith and Jones (1972) (Season 3 Episode 9: "The Strange Fate of Conrad Meyer Zulick") — Sheriff Sam
- Hawaii Five-O (1973) (Season 6 Episode 4: "One Big Happy Family") — Sam
- Night Gallery (1973) (Season 3 Episode 16: "Die Now, Pay Later") — Sheriff Ned Harlow
- Kung Fu (1974) (Season 2 Episode 13: "Empty Pages of a Dead Book") — Bart Fisher
- McMillan & Wife (1976) (Season 5 Episode 6: "Greed") — William Halstead
- The Life and Times of Grizzly Adams (1977) (Season 1 Episode 10: "The Unholy Beast") — Fine Hope
- ‘’ABC Weekend Specials ‘The Winged Colt’ (1977)
- How the West Was Won (1978) (5 Episodes) — Tap Henry
  - (Season 2 Episode 6: "Cattle Drive")
  - (Season 2 Episode 7: "Robber's Roost")
  - (Season 2 Episode 8: "Deek")
  - (Season 2 Episode 9: "The Judge") (credit only)
  - (Season 2 Episode 10: "Gold")
- Vega$ (1978) (Season 1 Episode 5: "Yes, My Darling Daughter") — Ben Handler
- The Misadventures of Sheriff Lobo (1979) (Season 1 Episode 5: "Run for the Money: Part 2" — Sergeant Wiley
- The Misadventures of Sheriff Lobo (1979) (Season 1 Episode 5: "Run for the Money: Part 2" — Sergeant Wiley
- B.J. and the Bear (1979–1981) (5 episodes) — Sergeant Beauregard Wiley
  - (Season 2 Episode 1: "Snow White and the Seven Lady Truckers: Part 1")
  - (Season 2 Episode 2: "Snow White and the Seven Lady Truckers: Part 2")
  - (Season 2 Episode 6: "Run for the Money")
  - (Season 2 Episode 8: "Mary Ellen")
  - (Season 3 Episode 2: "B.J. and the Seven Lady Truckers: Part 2")
- Jake's Way'' (1980 unsold pilot) (TV movie) — Sam Hargis
- The Love Boat (1980) (Season 3 Episode 18) — Grandpa Luke Scofield
- The Love Boat (1980) (Season 3 Episode 19) — Grandpa Luke Scofield
- Hee Haw (1981–1983) — series regular

== See also ==
- List of people with brain tumors
