= Savannah Smiles =

1982 film by Pierre De Moro

- Directed by: Pierre De Moro
- Written by: Mark Miller
- Produced by: Clark L. Paylow
- Starring: Mark Miller; Donovan Scott; Bridgette Andersen; Peter Graves; Michael Parks; Chris Robinson; Barbara Stanger; Pat Morita; Carol Wayne
- Cinematography: Stephen W. Gray
- Edited by: Eva Ruggiero
- Music by: Ken Sutherland
- Distributed by: Embassy Pictures
- Release date: April 9, 1982
- Running time: 105 minutes
- Country: United States
- Language: English
- Box office: $10,413,730 or $3.8 million

Savannah Smiles is a 1982 family film written and produced by Mark Miller. Miller also played one of the male leads in the film. The film was directed by Pierre De Moro, and starred Bridgette Andersen as the title character, with Mark Miller and Donovan Scott as the two vagabonds who befriend her.

== Plot ==
Six-year-old Savannah's father, a wealthy Salt Lake City businessman, is running for the United States Senate. Savannah has been relegated to the background in the lives of her mother and father. Feeling neglected, she decides to run away, packs her things and writes a note to her parents. Her aunt comes by to pick her up for a planned trip to the park, and Savannah manages to place her suitcase into the car unnoticed. At the park Savannah slips away and sneaks into the back seat of the car of Alvin "Alvie" Gibbs and Boots "Bootsie" McGaffee, two escaped, down-on-their-luck convicts. Savannah's father finds her note, but fearing that news of her running away and being exposed as a neglectful father would damage his chances of winning the election, he burns the note and orders the maid not to tell anyone. The convicts reluctantly take Savannah with them, but soon discover her parents have posted a $100,000 reward for her safe return. Alvie and Boots believe their luck has finally come in, but wonder how they could return Savannah and collect the reward without drawing attention to themselves and being sent back to prison. While trying to work it out they unexpectedly become attached to Savannah, and Savannah finds the love and attention she always wanted. Alvie confides in Savannah that he himself was a runaway, having left his abusive and neglectful next of kin as a child. The convicts arrange to return her, with the help of the family priest, but she becomes lost in the Uinta Mountains of northeastern Utah. Forgoing an opportunity to escape, the convicts search for Savannah and bring her back to safety, ultimately surrendering their freedom. As Savannah drives away with her parents, Boots tells Alvie he hopes no one tells Savannah they were "bad guys", but Alvie assures him it will make no difference to her. The film ends with a flashback of a young Alvie catching up to the pick-up truck with his cousins welcoming him on, finally having gained the family he never had.

== Production ==
Mark Miller was the creative force behind the project. He conceived the story, wrote the screenplay, starred in and produced the movie. Miller got the idea for the movie when his daughter Savannah was a toddler. Her unruly curly blonde hair and smiling face struck Miller as so appealing that he came to believe he could make a successful movie around that alone. He had to build a story for the little girl, and borrowed from the 1937 French movie La Grande Illusion, where an escaped hardened prisoner hides out in the home of a young widow, and is softened by the kindness of her daughter. Miller titled the story after his daughter Savannah. To finance the production he went to Texas oil man Hal Clifford. Though many thought the movie would have no audience, Miller believed the project would appeal to young women. He was proved right.

Sixty child actresses tried out for the part of Savannah. This was narrowed down to twelve who were asked to audition before Miller, including Drew Barrymore. Auditioning Bridgette Andersen, he asked her to tell him any bedtime story she knew. Bridgette told Miller the story of Br'er Rabbit. He liked her telling of the story so well he included it in the movie.

He asked Donovan Scott to play the role of Boots McGaffey, Alvie's friend, and relied upon him for the slapstick comedy that he used to lighten the story.

The film was shot on location in Salt Lake City, Provo Canyon, and in the mountain country to the southeast near Sundance in Utah. The gondola scene was shot at the area's Bridal Veil Falls.

== Release ==
Short on funds to promote the movie, Miller teamed with Eunice Shriver of Special Olympics, a charity he supported. Miller committed the gross revenue from the opening weekend of the film to the Special Olympics for their aid in promoting the release. Shriver agreed.

After a short theater run, the movie received extensive play on cable television, and was featured on such channels as HBO.

=== Reception ===
Commentator Lacey Worrell notes "Written by Mark Miller (father of actress Penelope Ann Miller), who plays Alvie, it is less about Savannah and more about Alvie, who, after a lifetime of neglect himself, finally learns to love, thanks to Savannah."

=== Accolades ===
For her work in the film, Bridgette Andersen received a nomination for a Youth in Film Award for Best Actress.
