= Beatrice Downtown Historic District =

Historic district in Nebraska, United States

- U.S. National Register of Historic Places
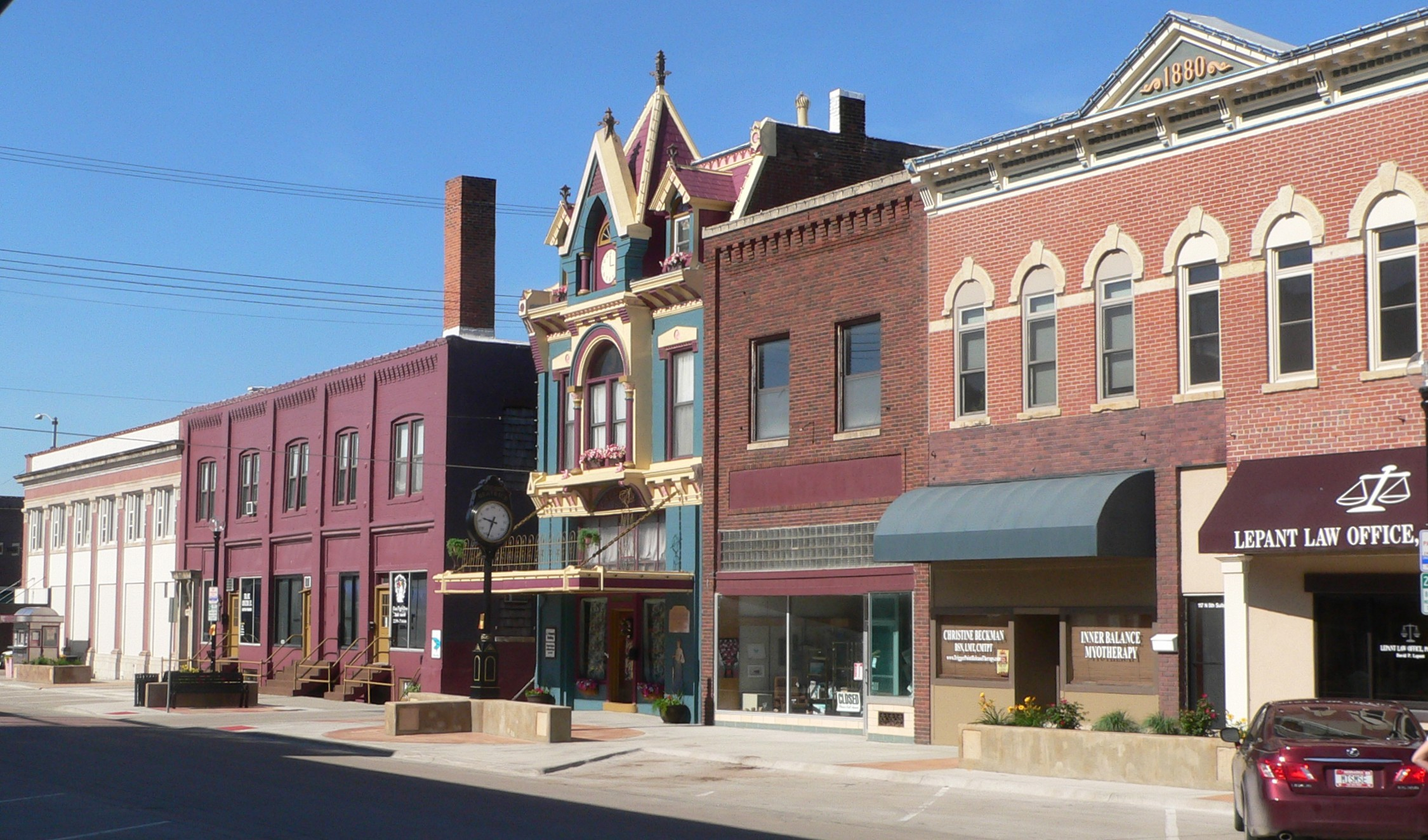

- Location within Nebraska Location within the United States
- Location: Centered on 6th and Court Streets, Beatrice, Nebraska
- Coordinates: 40°15′57″N 96°44′48″W
- Area: 40 acres (16 ha)
- NRHP reference No.: 16000481
- Added to NRHP: July 25, 2016

The Beatrice Downtown Historic District in Beatrice, Nebraska is a historic district which was listed on the National Register of Historic Places in 2016.

The listing included 113 contributing buildings, six contributing structures, and a contributing site on about 40 acres (16 ha).

It consists mainly of one- to three-story brick, wood and stone commercial buildings. It includes four buildings already listed on the National Register:

- Beatrice City Library,
- Beatrice Municipal Auditorium,
- Paddock/Kensington Hotel, and
- Schmuck Building.
