= National Register of Historic Places listings in Gage County, Nebraska =

Location of Gage County in Nebraska

Gage County, Nebraska, United States, has 31 properties and districts listed on the National Register of Historic Places.

The locations of National Register properties and districts for which the latitude and longitude coordinates are included below may be seen in a map.

This National Park Service list is complete through NPS recent listings posted August 28, 2026.

== Current listings ==
	Name on the Register	Image	Date listed	Location	City or town	Description
1	Barneston Site		January 21, 1974 (#74001117)	Address Restricted	Barneston	
2	Beatrice Chautauqua Pavilion and Gatehouse	Beatrice Chautauqua Pavilion and Gatehouse	April 9, 1979 (#79001445)	6th and Grable Sts. 40°15′08″N 96°44′21″W	Beatrice	
3	Beatrice City Library	Beatrice City Library	July 12, 1976 (#76001131)	220 N. 5th St. 40°16′04″N 96°44′53″W	Beatrice	
4	Beatrice Downtown Historic District	Beatrice Downtown Historic District	July 25, 2016 (#16000481)	Centered on 6th and Court Streets; 40°15′57″N 96°44′48″W	Beatrice	
5	Beatrice Municipal Auditorium	Beatrice Municipal Auditorium	November 16, 2005 (#05001293)	205 N. 4th St. 40°16′02″N 96°45′01″W	Beatrice	
6	Big Indian Creek Bridge	Big Indian Creek Bridge	June 29, 1992 (#92000760)	Township road over Big Indian Creek, 3 miles (4.8 km) southwest of Wymore; 40°05′13″N 96°43′22″W	Wymore	
7	Bloody Run Bridge	Bloody Run Bridge	June 29, 1992 (#92000759)	Township road over Bloody Run, 4 miles (6.4 km) southwest of Virginia; 40°15′44″N 96°44′15″W	Virginia	Moved to Beatrice, where it serves as a footbridge at Big Blue Water Park
8	Blue Springs Site		August 14, 1973 (#73001063)	Address Restricted	Blue Springs	
9	Lake Bridenthal House	Lake Bridenthal House	February 24, 1983 (#83001095)	113 S. 9th St. 40°07′19″N 96°39′55″W	Wymore	
10	Bridge	Bridge	June 29, 1992 (#92000761)	Township road over Sicily Creek, 6 miles (9.7 km) northwest of Wymore; 40°09′06″N 96°47′03″W	Wymore	Apparently no longer extant
11	Burlington Northern Depot	Burlington Northern Depot	May 2, 1975 (#75001092)	101 N. 2nd St. 40°15′59″N 96°45′10″W	Beatrice	Now the Gage County Historical Society Museum.
12	Centenary Methodist Episcopal Church	Centenary Methodist Episcopal Church	March 6, 2023 (#100008674)	608 Elk St. 40°16′05″N 96°44′47″W	Beatrice	
12	Christ Church Episcopal	Christ Church Episcopal	November 29, 1999 (#99001389)	520 N. 5th St. 40°16′18″N 96°44′52″W	Beatrice	
13	DeWitt Flour Mills and King Iron Bridge	DeWitt Flour Mills and King Iron Bridge	December 27, 1978 (#78001699)	East of DeWitt on the Big Blue River; 40°23′31″N 96°54′15″W	DeWitt	
14	Marion and Ruth Ann Dole House	Marion and Ruth Ann Dole House	December 10, 2010 (#10001003)	1908 S. 4th St. 40°14′46″N 96°44′55″W	Beatrice	
15	Farmers State Bank	Farmers State Bank	June 11, 1992 (#92000702)	601 Main; 40°27′35″N 96°30′31″W	Adams	
16	Elijah Filley Stone Barn	Elijah Filley Stone Barn	April 11, 1977 (#77000830)	13282 E. Scott Road; 40°15′47″N 96°32′27″W	Filley	
17	First Commercial Bank	First Commercial Bank	November 15, 2007 (#07001190)	301 Main St. 40°03′00″N 96°48′07″W	Odell	
18	First Trinity Lutheran Church	First Trinity Lutheran Church	August 4, 2016 (#16000514)	11668 W. Highway 4; 40°18′24″N 96°52′45″W	Beatrice	Built in 1905
19	Gage County Courthouse	Gage County Courthouse	January 10, 1990 (#89002226)	612 Grant St. 40°16′16″N 96°44′46″W	Beatrice	
20	Homestead National Monument of America	Homestead National Monument of America	October 15, 1966 (#66000115)	4.5 miles (7.2 km) northwest of Beatrice on Nebraska Highway 4; 40°17′15″N 96°50′07″W	Beatrice	
21	Hoyt Street Bridge	Hoyt Street Bridge	June 29, 1992 (#92000758)	Vacated township road over the Big Blue River; 40°16′39″N 96°46′42″W	Beatrice	
22	Institution for Feeble Minded Youth Farm	Institution for Feeble Minded Youth Farm	December 8, 1997 (#97001521)	25478 S. 23rd Rd. 40°16′28″N 96°41′22″W	Beatrice	Now the Carriage House Bed & Breakfast
23	Johnson Cabin Museum	Johnson Cabin Museum	July 27, 2015 (#15000488)	Blue Springs Park; 40°08′26″N 96°39′44″W	Blue Springs	
24	Samuel D. Kilpatrick House	Samuel D. Kilpatrick House	December 20, 1984 (#84000476)	701 N. 7th St. 40°16′23″N 96°44′45″W	Beatrice	
25	Mission Creek Bridge	Mission Creek Bridge	June 29, 1992 (#92000762)	County road over Mission Creek, 7 miles (11 km) southwest of Barneston; 40°00′15″N 96°27′48″W	Barneston	
26	North Seventh Street Historic District	North Seventh Street Historic District	March 10, 2010 (#10000067)	N. 7th St. bounded by Garfield St. on the north and Washington St. on the south 40°16′27″N 96°44′43″W	Beatrice	
27	North Eleventh Street Historic District	North Eleventh Street Historic District	March 10, 2010 (#10000068)	N. 11th St. bounded by Garfield St. on the north and Lincoln St. on the south 40°16′26″N 96°44′23″W	Beatrice	
28	Paddock Hotel	Paddock Hotel	November 30, 1987 (#87002084)	105 N. 6th St. 40°15′58″N 96°44′50″W	Beatrice	
29	Rachel Kilpatrick Purdy House	Rachel Kilpatrick Purdy House	November 8, 2006 (#06000995)	1201 N. 11th St. 40°16′42″N 96°44′25″W	Beatrice	
30	J. Schmuck Block	J. Schmuck Block	July 2, 2008 (#08000598)	113 N. 5th St. 40°15′59″N 96°44′54″W	Beatrice	

== Former listings ==
	Name on the Register	Image	Date listed	Date removed	Location	City or town	Description
1	Algernon S. Paddock House	Algernon S. Paddock House	March 14, 1973 (#73001062)	March 25, 2019	1401 N. 10th St. 40°16′49″N 96°44′28″W	Beatrice	No longer extant

== See also ==
- List of National Historic Landmarks in Nebraska
- National Register of Historic Places listings in Nebraska
