= Beatrice Chautauqua Pavilion and Gatehouse =

- U.S. National Register of Historic Places
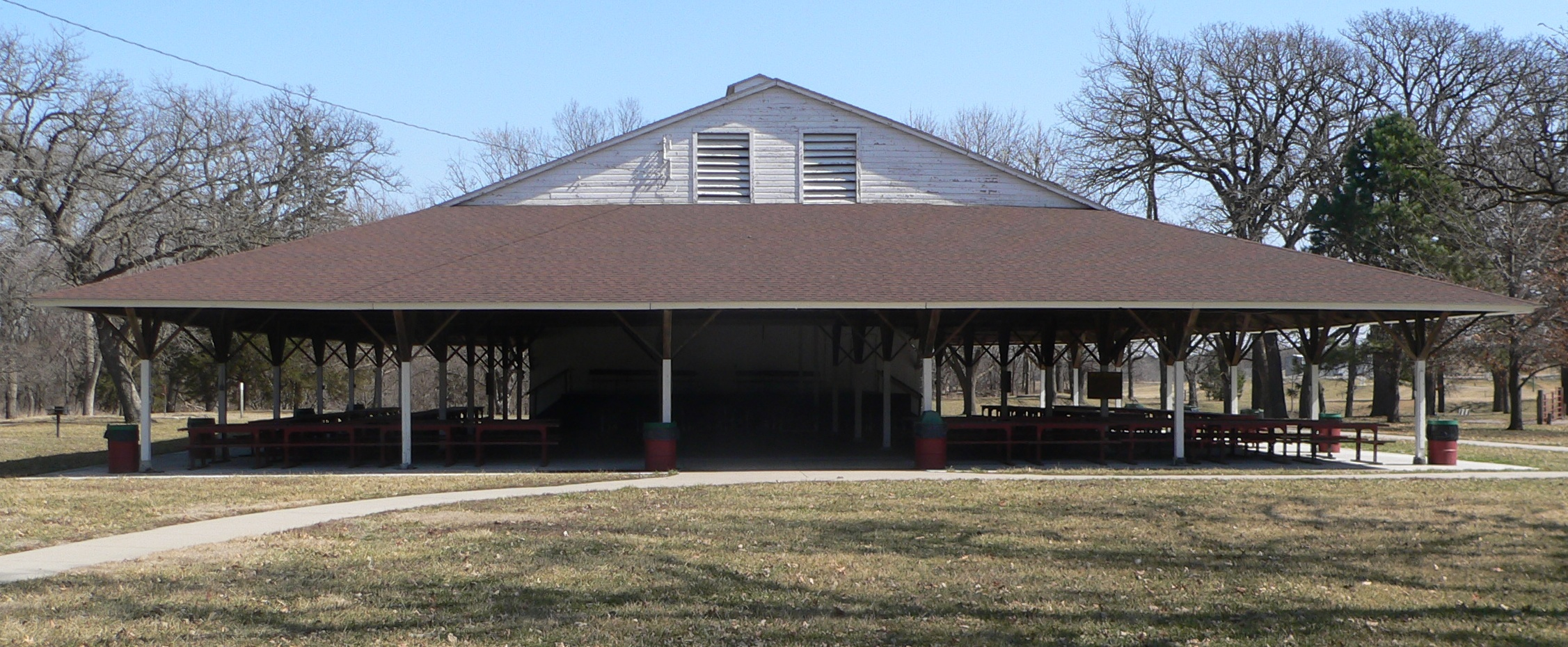
- The building in 2012

- Location within Nebraska Location within the United States
- Location: 6th and Grable Streets, Beatrice, Nebraska
- Coordinates: 40°15′08″N 96°44′22″W
- Area: 3 acres (1.2 ha)
- Built: 1889
- Architectural style: Gothic Revival
- NRHP reference No.: 79001445
- Added to NRHP: April 9, 1979

The Beatrice Chautauqua Pavilion and Gatehouse is a historic structure in Beatrice, Nebraska. The pavilion was built in 1889 for the Chautauqua movement, which held meetings in Beatrice until 1916. The gatehouse, designed in the Gothic Revival architectural style, was moved to its current location after 1916, and the porch was added circa 1920. The structure has been listed on the National Register of Historic Places since April 9, 1979.
