= Beatrice City Library =

Beatrice Public Library
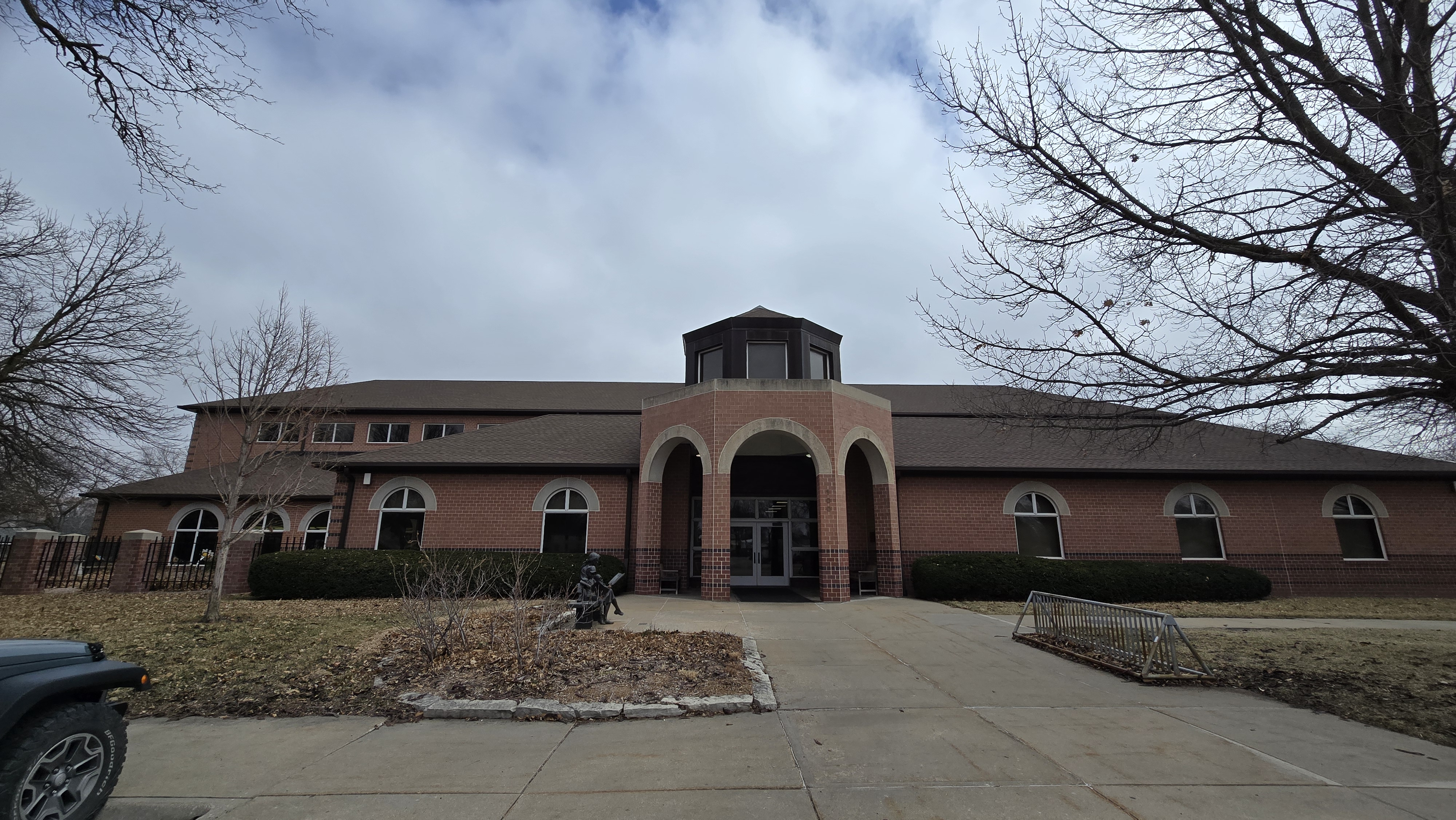
- 40.266°N 96.7317°W
- Location: 100 N 16th Street, Beatrice, NE 68310
- Type: Public Library
- Established: 1893

Collection
- Size: 81,349

Access and use
- Circulation: 64,351
- Population served: 13,955 registered users

Other information
- Budget: $540,413
- Website: https://www.beatrice.ne.gov/library

Beatrice Public Library is the public library of the city of Beatrice, Nebraska. It was established in 1893. The city library was first located in the Beatrice post office, then moved to the Beatrice Carnegie library in 1904. The Carnegie library was listed on the National Register of Historic Places in 1976. The current library building opened in 1991.

== History ==
=== Early circulating libraries ===
==== Public Library Association of Beatrice ====
In February 1873, the Ladies Library Association of Beatrice began soliciting books, periodical subscriptions, and memberships from the community. Their library, the first in Beatrice, opened in October 1873 with 273 volumes. It was housed in the office space owned by Leonard Colby with his wife Clara Colby serving as the first librarian.

The association used a subscription business model, charging a $1 membership fee annually with other subscription plans available. The member could withdraw one book at the time for two weeks.

The association changed their name to name “The Public Library Association of Beatrice” in 1877 and removed all of the female pronouns from its constitution allowing men to serve as officers. At its height of success, the library had over 300 volumes, a reading room, and hosted a lecture series including suffragist Elizabeth Cady Stanton and author Eli Perkins.

Competition from the Red Ribbon Club opening a reading room did not bode well for the association's library. Their debts grew, patronage decreased, and the reading room closed in 1879. The library operated out of the Colby's home for a short time before officially closing.

==== Red Ribbon Club ====
In early 1878, the Beatrice Red Ribbon Club announced plans to open a library and reading room. The Red Ribbon movement in Nebraska was headed by temperance activist John B. Finch. Their reading room provided competition to the Library Association but was short lived, operating for only a few years.

==== Women's Christian Temperance Union ====
The local Woman's Christian Temperance Union (WCTU) created a third version of a public circulating library. In March 1881, the WCTU Library and Reading Room was founded. Clara Colby loaned 384 volumes from the Library Association’s books to the library. By January 1883, there were 642 books in the library's collection. In 1893, the Beatrice City Council agreed to use the WCTU collection to establish a free public library.

=== Free public library ===
In November 1893, the Beatrice Free Public Library was established. The library's creation was the culmination of effort by the Beatrice Literary Club, founded in 1890. The Literary Club offered the city the WCTU library and use the Club's capital as seed money to establish a city library with full and free access which the city accepted. The library was moved into the upper floor of the newly built post office building.

- Beatrice City Library
- U.S. National Register of Historic Places
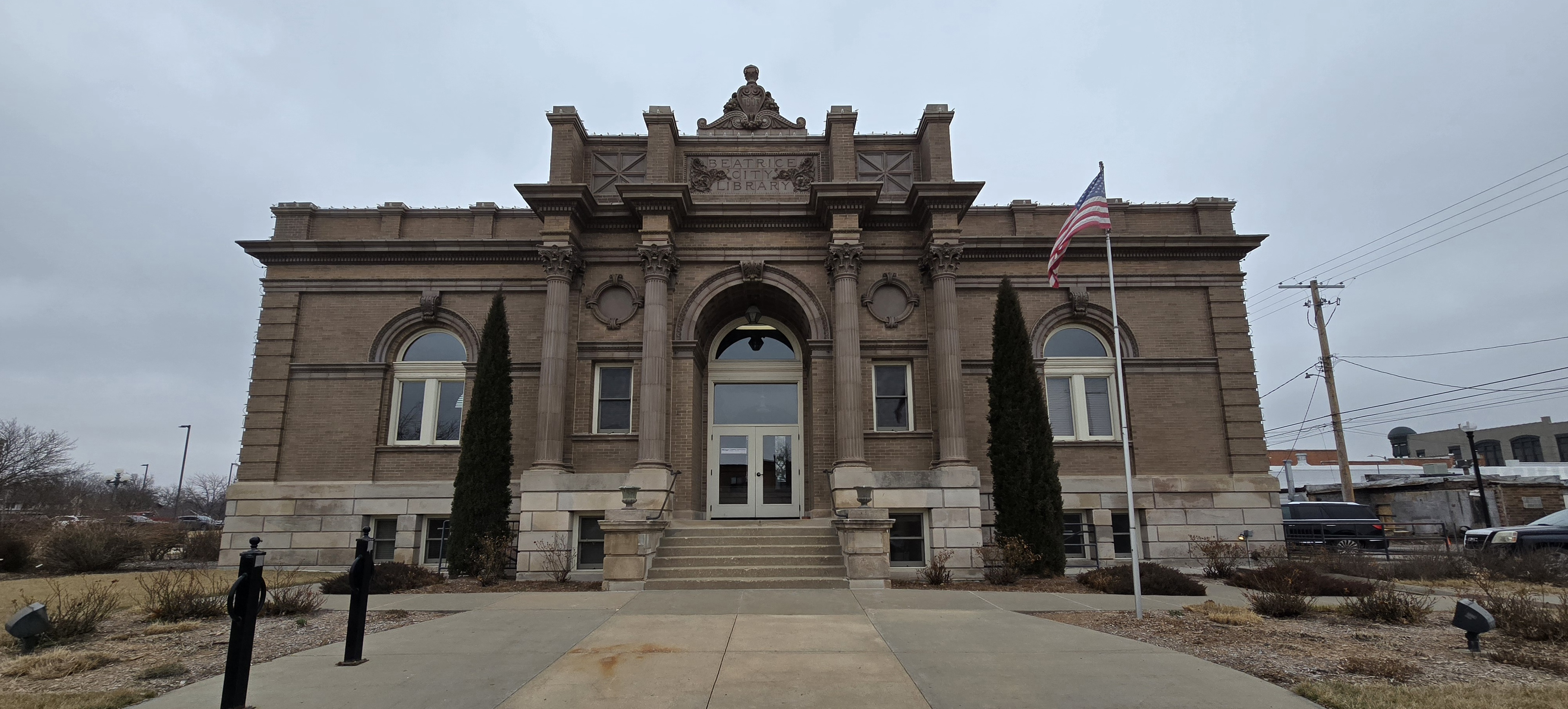
- Exterior of the Beatrice Carnegie building

- Location within Nebraska Location within the United States
- Location: 218 N. 5th St., Beatrice, Nebraska
- Coordinates: 40°16′04″N 96°44′53″W
- Area: less than one acre
- Built: 1902-03
- Architect: George A. Berlinghof
- Architectural style: Beaux Arts
- NRHP reference No.: 76001131
- Added to NRHP: July 12, 1976

In the 1898 annual report, the board of directors mentioned a need for a better library facility. An endowment fund was suggested and was the seed to securing a Carnegie gift.

=== Carnegie library ===
In 1902, the Library Board obtained a grant of $20,000 from Andrew Carnegie for the construction of a library building. The building was constructed in 1902-03. It is located at 218 North 5th Street near the center of Beatrice's downtown business district and the current Beatrice Middle School. This was the third Carnegie library built in Nebraska and the oldest still standing.

The building is constructed of brick with a limestone basement. A central entrance rises above the half basement into the main rotunda with marble floors. All of the furniture was made of oak with wood flooring throughout the rest of the building. To the north was the staff room and reference desk. To the south was the reading room, though it initially was the children's section. The octagonally-shaped wing to the east was the book stack area. The basement housed the safe, storage rooms, and mechanical spaces.

The Beatrice Carnegie library is one of only two examples of the Beaux Arts Classicism identified in Nebraska. It was designed by Beatrice-based architect George A. Berlinghof. The design predates when Carnegie libraries had required architectural specifications. The building has been considered one of the most elaborate Carnegie libraries ever built.

The library was opened on January 28, 1904. One that day 200 new patron cards were issued. The library was built with a capacity of 30,000 volumes though they had less than 8,000 in circulation when it opened. Capacity was nearly reached within 50 years. By 1953, there were 26,838 volumes in the library.

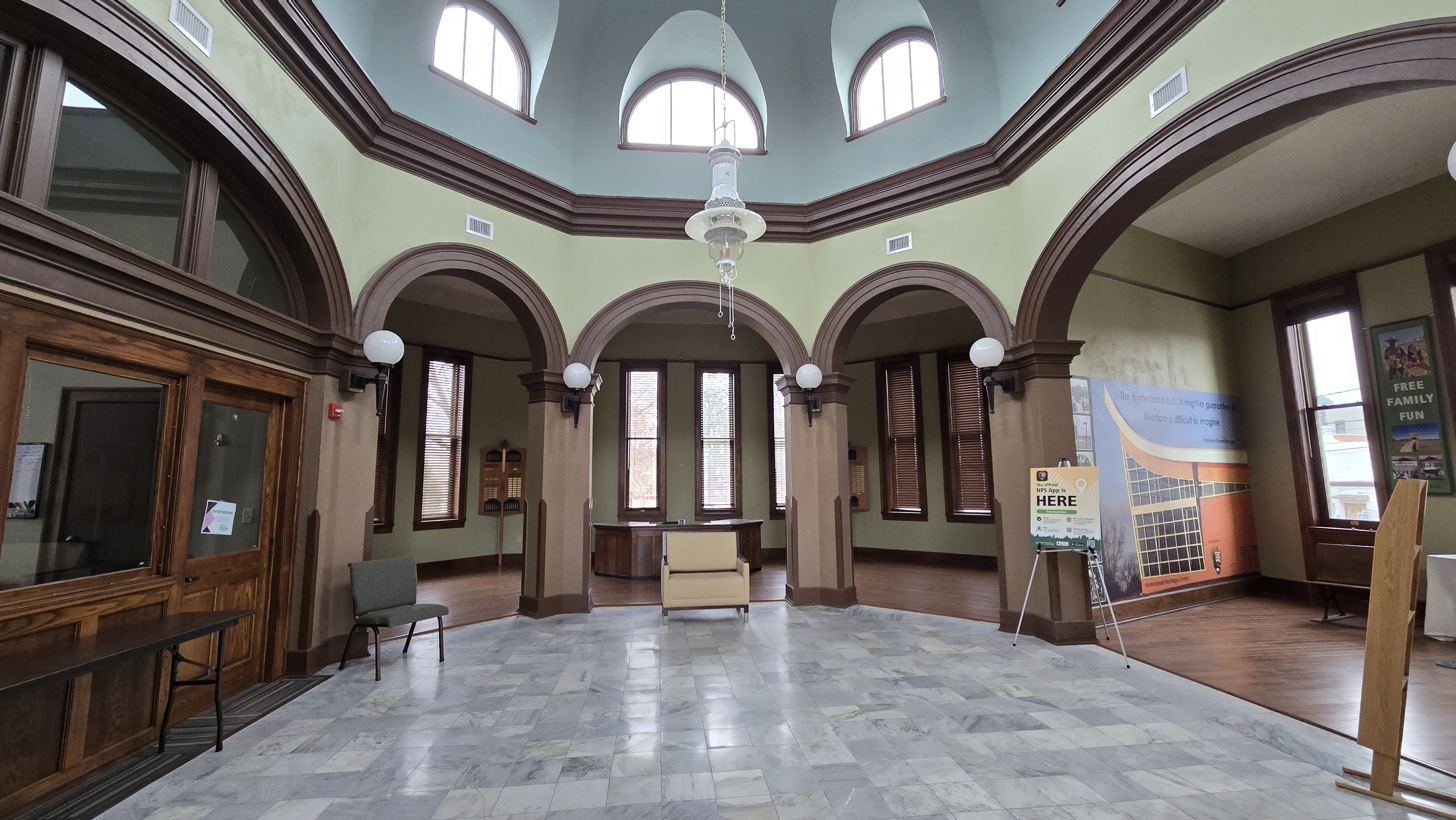
Rotunda of the Beatrice Carnegie building facing east

Many changes were made over the years including the decision in 1907 to move the children's section to the basement auditorium. The interior was remodeled circa 1968-71 and many original furnishings were replaced over decades of use. The Beatrice Carnegie library was listed on the National Register of Historic Places in 1976. The exterior retained most of its original character at that time.

The library remained in the building until 1991, operating for 87 years. In 2001, the non-profit Carnegie Center Inc. was founded to help restore the building. It now houses civic organizations and space for exhibits and events. The exterior had a major renovation from 2010 to 2012.

=== Current library ===
In 1988, the Beatrice City Council selected a new library facility as one of their top priorities. The cost of the project was estimated at $2.5 million. Plans were set for a new building to open by the library's 100th birthday in 1993. The money was raised faster than expected. A campaign raised over a million dollars to build a new library building in three years. Donations came from 547 individuals, 106 business, 99 organizations, as well as foundations and grants. Ground was broken for the new structure on April 14, 1990.

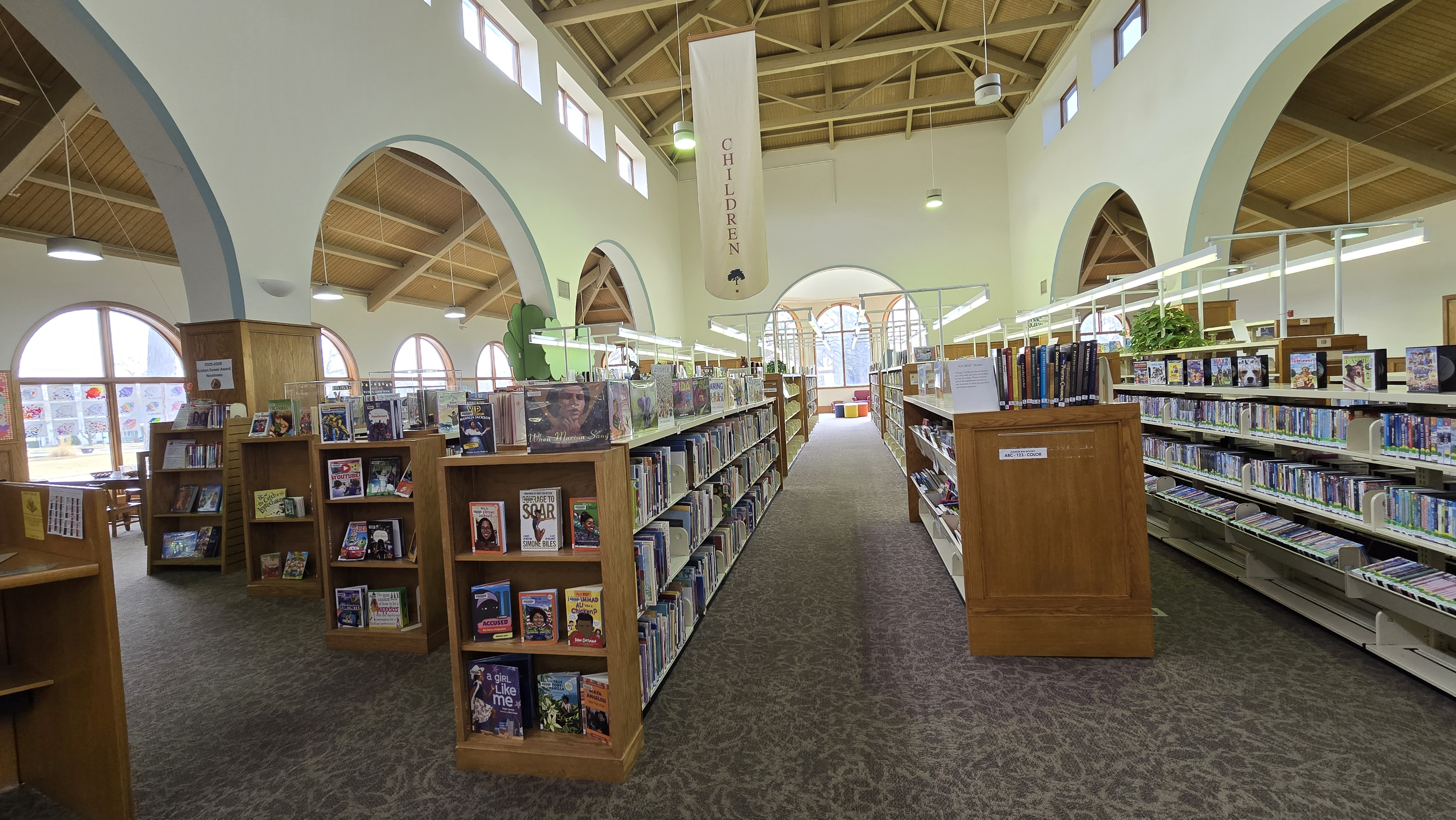
Interior of the Beatrice Public Library main floor facing south

The brick building features many large windows for natural light and artwork inside and out including a brick mural at the entrance. The building's main floor includes the children's section on the east side and the adult section on the west side. A staircase leads to the basement with reference books, genealogical records, and exhibits. The library was built with 23,000 square feet of floor space and the ability to hold up to 90,000 books. This nearly quadrupled the previous library floor space of 6,000 square feet.

The library moved its collection into its new location at 100 N 16th Street in August 1991. In that month 313 new library users were reported, and 176 library cards were renewed. The library's official opening was on November 9, 1991. At its opening, there were over 55,000 volumes in the collection.

== Services ==
As of 2024, the library had 13,955 registered users and a collection of 81,349 items. A Beatrice Public Library card is free to all Gage County residents. The library offers various services including physical books, digital media, computers, book discussions, children's reading programs, and art displays.

=== Heritage Room ===
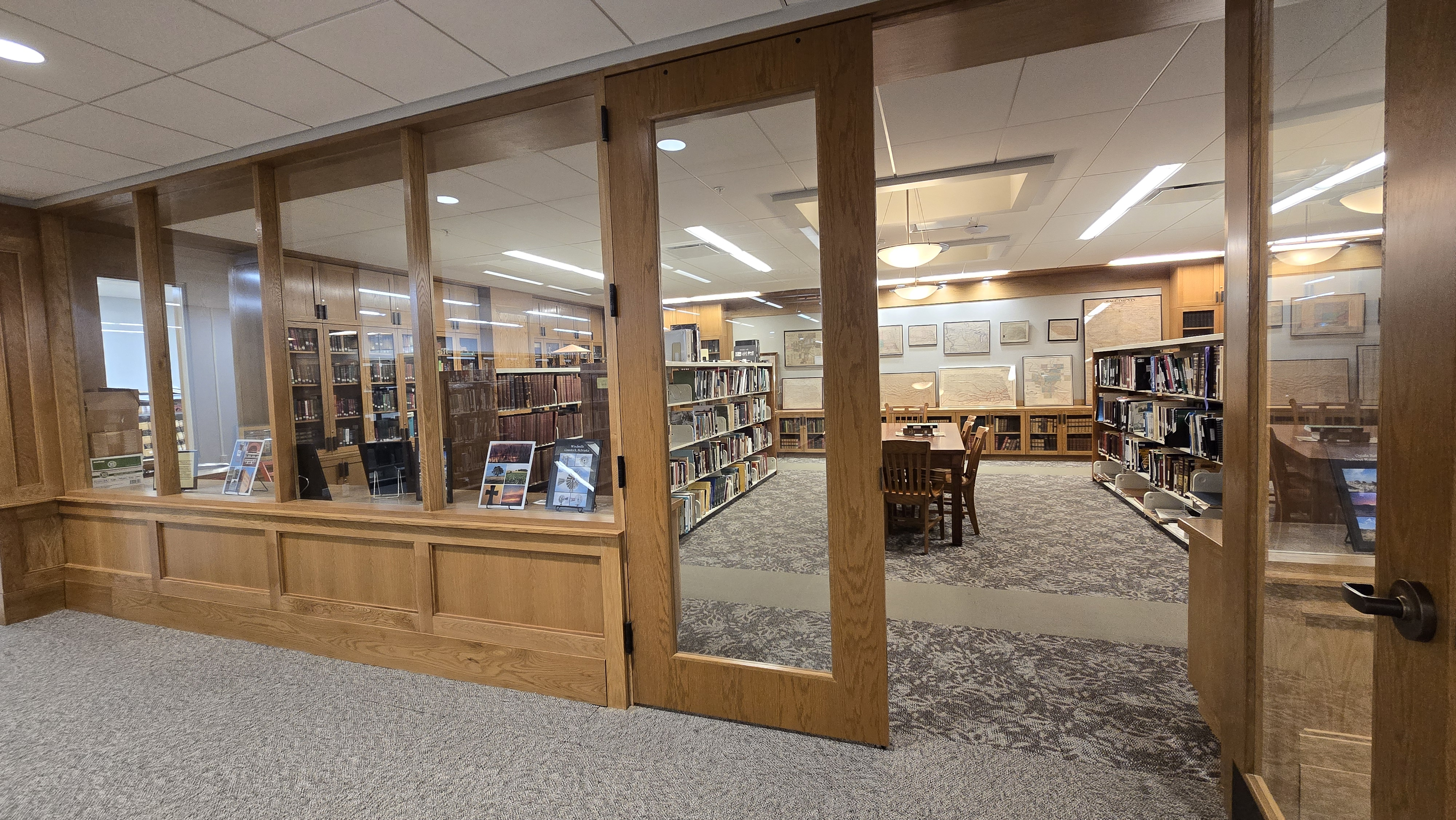
Heritage Room in the basement of the Beatrice Public Library

The library's genealogy center is located in the basement of the building in the climate-controlled Heritage Room. The material focuses on Gage County and Southeast Nebraska. The Southeast Nebraska Genealogical Society materials were combined with the library's collection in 1979. The room also contains historic books from the inception of the library in 1893, the oldest one dating to the 1840s. Two of the original tables from the Carnegie library were moved this room along with the original 1903 card catalog.

The Heritage Room also houses the Nebraska State Genealogical Society's collection which contains material from every county in Nebraska. The collection was moved to the building in 1992. It previously was located in a private residence in Exeter, Nebraska.

=== Makerspace ===
The Beatrice Public Library Makerspace opened in 2019. The maker movement combines traditional hobbies with innovative technology. Among the equipment available in the Beatrice Public Library Makerspace is a 3D printer, laser cutter, vinyl cutter, and embroidery sewing machine. It was funded in part by a grant from the Institute of Museums and Library Services.

=== StoryWalk ===
The 2019 Leadership Beatrice class created the StoryWalk at Riverside Park. It consists of 20 displays along the Homestead Trail at 2nd Street, between Ella and Grant Streets. Each display shows pages of a children's story that are changed out by the Beatrice Public Library staff.
