= Rachel Kilpatrick Purdy House =

- U.S. National Register of Historic Places
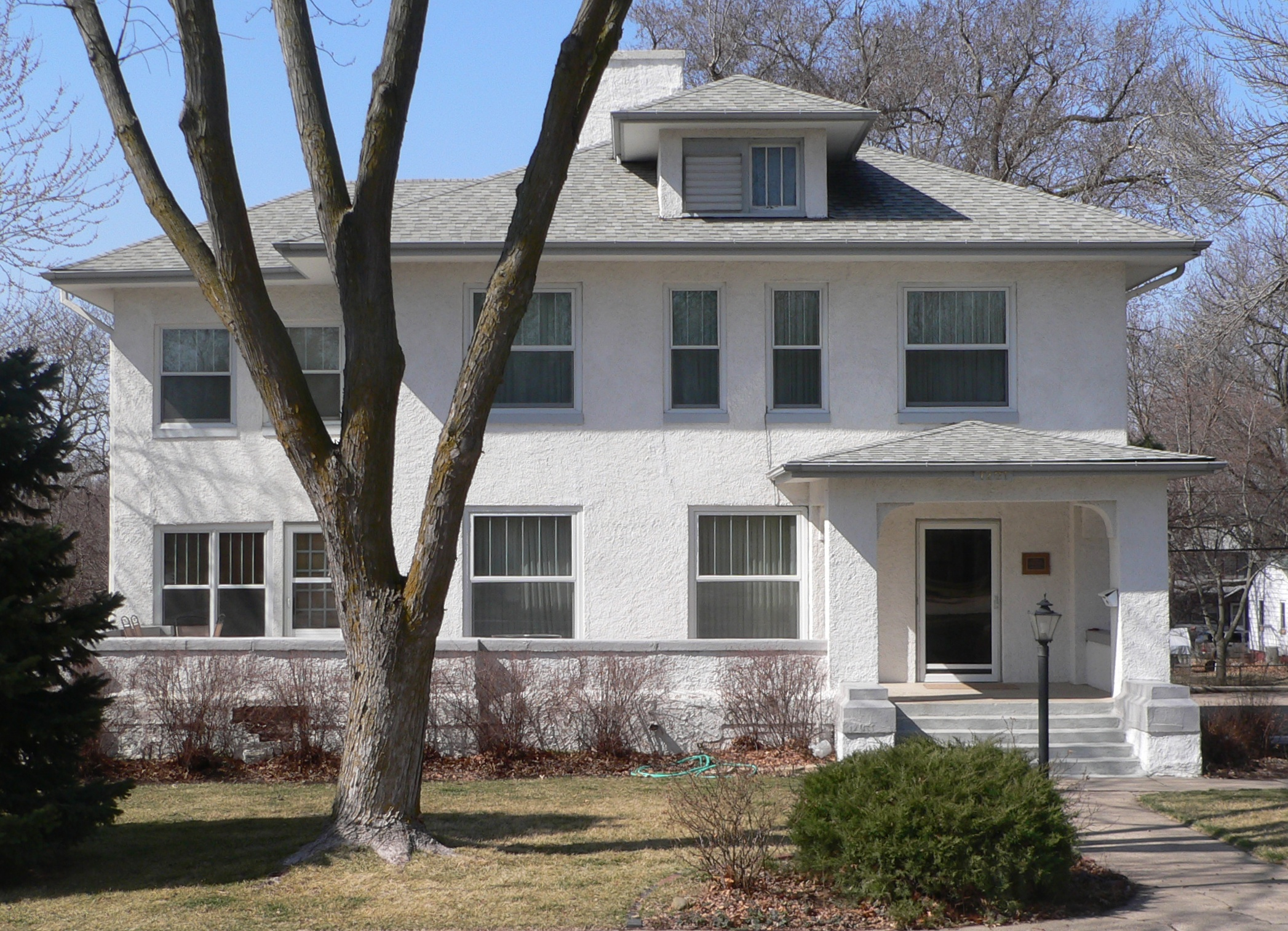
- The house in 2012

- Location within Nebraska Location within the United States
- Location: 1201 North 11th Street, Beatrice, Nebraska
- Coordinates: 40°16′42″N 96°44′23″W
- Area: less than one acre
- Built: 1915
- Built by: George Stump
- Architect: Richard W. Grant
- Architectural style: Prairie School
- NRHP reference No.: 06000995
- Added to NRHP: November 8, 2006

The Rachel Kilpatrick Purdy House is a historic house in Beatrice, Nebraska. It was built in 1915 for Rachel Kilpatrick as a wedding gift from her father, and designed in the Prairie School style by architect Richard W. Grant. It remained in the Kilpatrick family until 1925. It has been listed on the National Register of Historic Places since November 8, 2006.
