= Christ Church Episcopal (Beatrice, Nebraska) =

- U.S. National Register of Historic Places
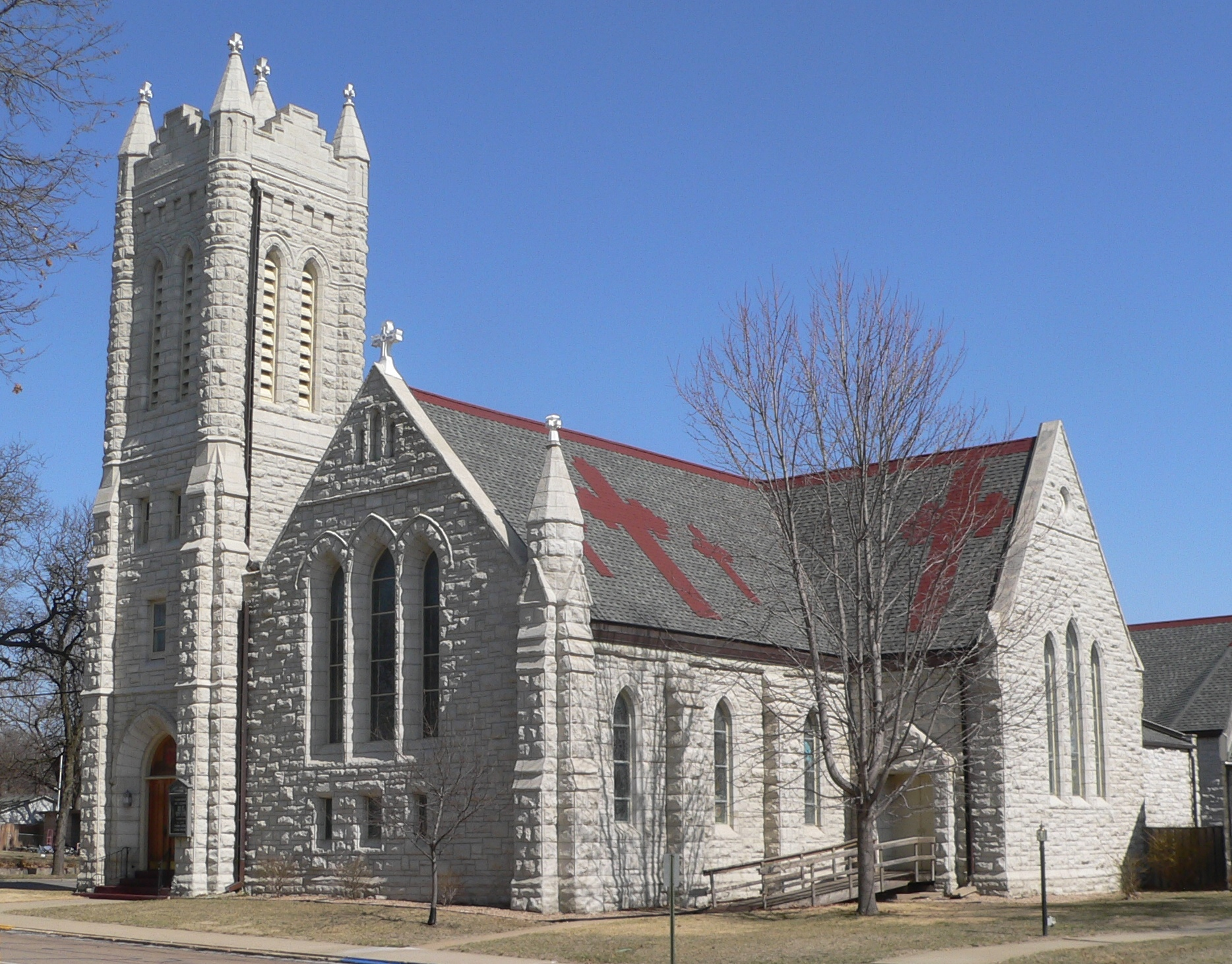
- The church in 2012

- Location within Nebraska Location within the United States
- Location: 520 North 5th Street, Beatrice, Nebraska
- Coordinates: 40°16′17″N 96°44′51″W
- Area: less than one acre
- Built: 1889
- Architect: Mendelsson & Laurie
- Architectural style: Gothic Revival
- NRHP reference No.: 99001389
- Added to NRHP: November 29, 1999

Christ Church Episcopal is a historic church building in Beatrice, Nebraska. The church is part of the Episcopal Diocese of Nebraska.

In 2015, the church reported 152 members; in 2023, it reported 146 members. No membership statistics were reported in 2024 national parochial reports. Plate and pledge financial support reported by the church in 2024 was $59,557. Average Sunday Attendance (ASA) reported in 2024 was 24 persons.

== Building and history ==
It was built in 1889-1890 for the local Episcopal congregation established in 1873. The building was designed in the Gothic Revival style by Mendelsson & Laurie. The rectory was built in 1951. The property has been listed on the National Register of Historic Places since November 29, 1999.
