= J. Schmuck Block =

Notable building of Beatrice, Nebraska, built in 1887

- U.S. National Register of Historic Places
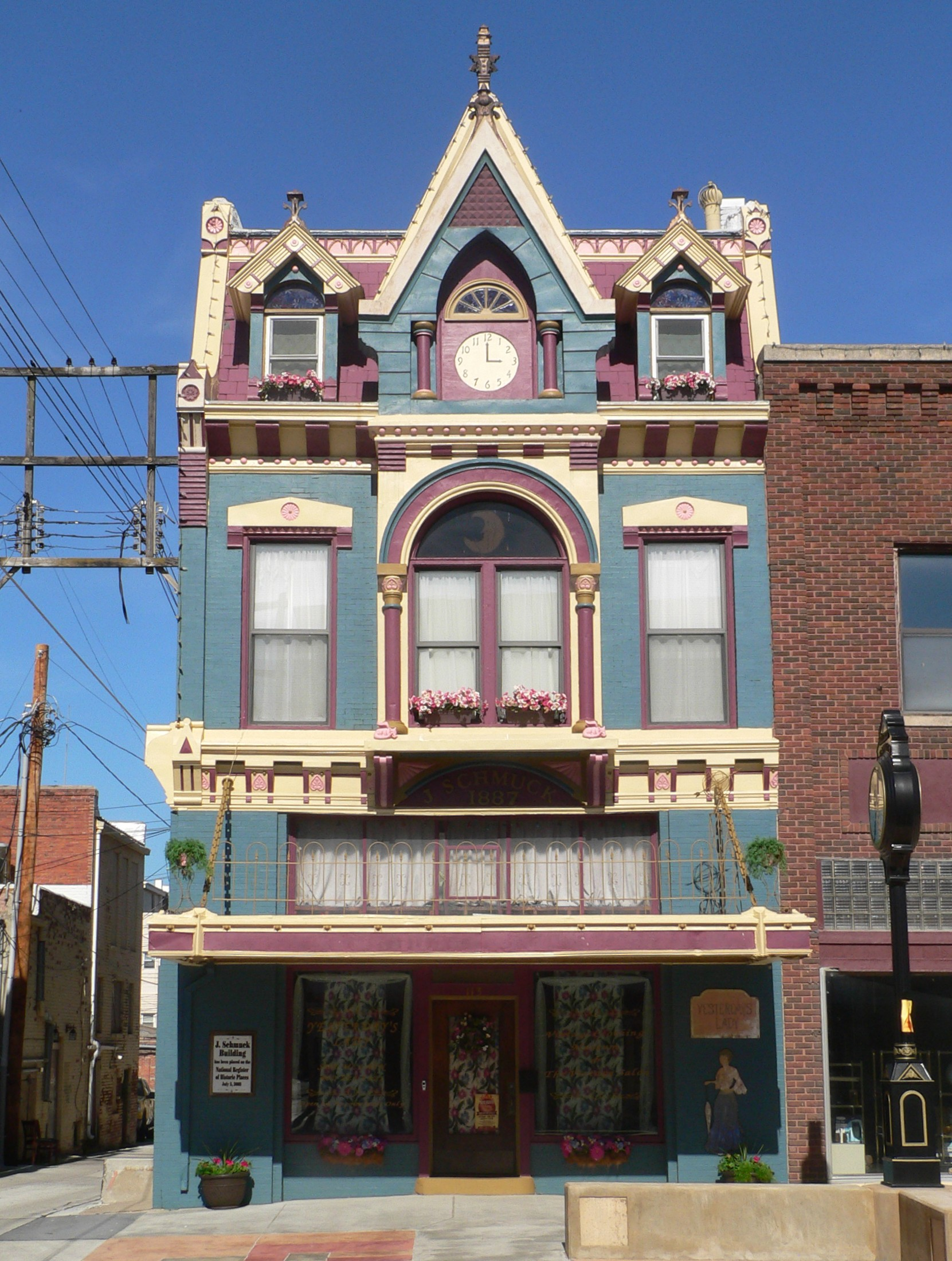
- The building's exterior in 2015

- Location within Nebraska Location within the United States
- Location: 113 North 5th Street, Beatrice, Nebraska
- Coordinates: 40°15′59″N 96°44′54″W
- Area: less than one acre
- Built: 1887
- Architectural style: Late Victorian, High Victorian Gothic
- NRHP reference No.: 08000598
- Added to NRHP: July 2, 2008

The J. Schmuck Block is a historic three-story commercial and residential building in Beatrice, Nebraska, United States. It was built in 1887 for John Schmuck, a German immigrant and cobbler, who used the basement as a tavern and rented the first floor to dry goods stores and the second floor to tenants. The Beatrice Morning Sun had its offices here for more than four decades. The building has been listed on the National Register of Historic Places since July 2, 2008.

== History ==
The three-story structure in Beatrice, Nebraska, was built in 1887 with bricks, a limestone foundation, and an asphalt-and-slate roof, for John Schmuck, an immigrant from Germany, and his wife Anna. Schmuck was born in Darmstadt, Germany, in 1834. He was trained as a cobbler like his father, and he emigrated to the United States in 1854. He lived in New York, Illinois, and Tennessee before moving to Beatrice around 1873, where he became a professional cobbler. He purchased the plot of land in 1883 and only built the structure four years later, once he was retired.

Schmuck lived on the third floor until 1916 (although he died in an insane asylum in Hastings in August of that year at the age of 84), and his widow Anna until 1917. The Schmucks rented the first and second floors of the building to businesses and tenants. Dry goods stores on the first floor included Jones and Smith Dry Goods Store and the C. E. Smith and Son Dry Goods Store. In 1905, one of the tenants, R. A. Swift, who had served in the American Civil War, was found dead in his room on the second floor. In 1908, Judge Walden rented an office in the building. The basement was used as a tavern, with a side entrance.

From 1918 to 1963, the building belonged to E. M. Marvin, who used it as the offices of his local newspaper, the Beatrice Morning Sun. Marvin, who was both the publisher and editor, moved the printing presses to the basement, and the rest of the building was used by his journalistic staff. When the building was acquired by a lawyer in the 1960s, the couple removed the stained glass on the second floor and took it to another house they owned. The building was purchased and restored by another couple in 2006.

== Architectural significance ==
The building was designed in the eclectic High Victorian Gothic architectural style, with a Second Empire roof, Gothic Revival windows, and Queen Anne wall trims. Jill E. Dolberg of the Nebraska State Historical Society said, "In many ways, this commercial building is unique for Nebraska commercial architecture. Most commercial architecture of this era in Nebraska is far more austere, perhaps displaying some decorative brickwork or round arches. An effusive facade such as this one is a rarity indeed."

The building has been listed on the National Register of Historic Places since July 2, 2008.
