= Daniel Freeman =

American homesteader

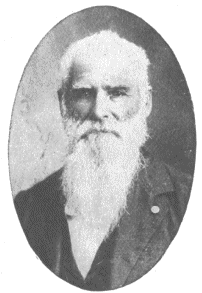

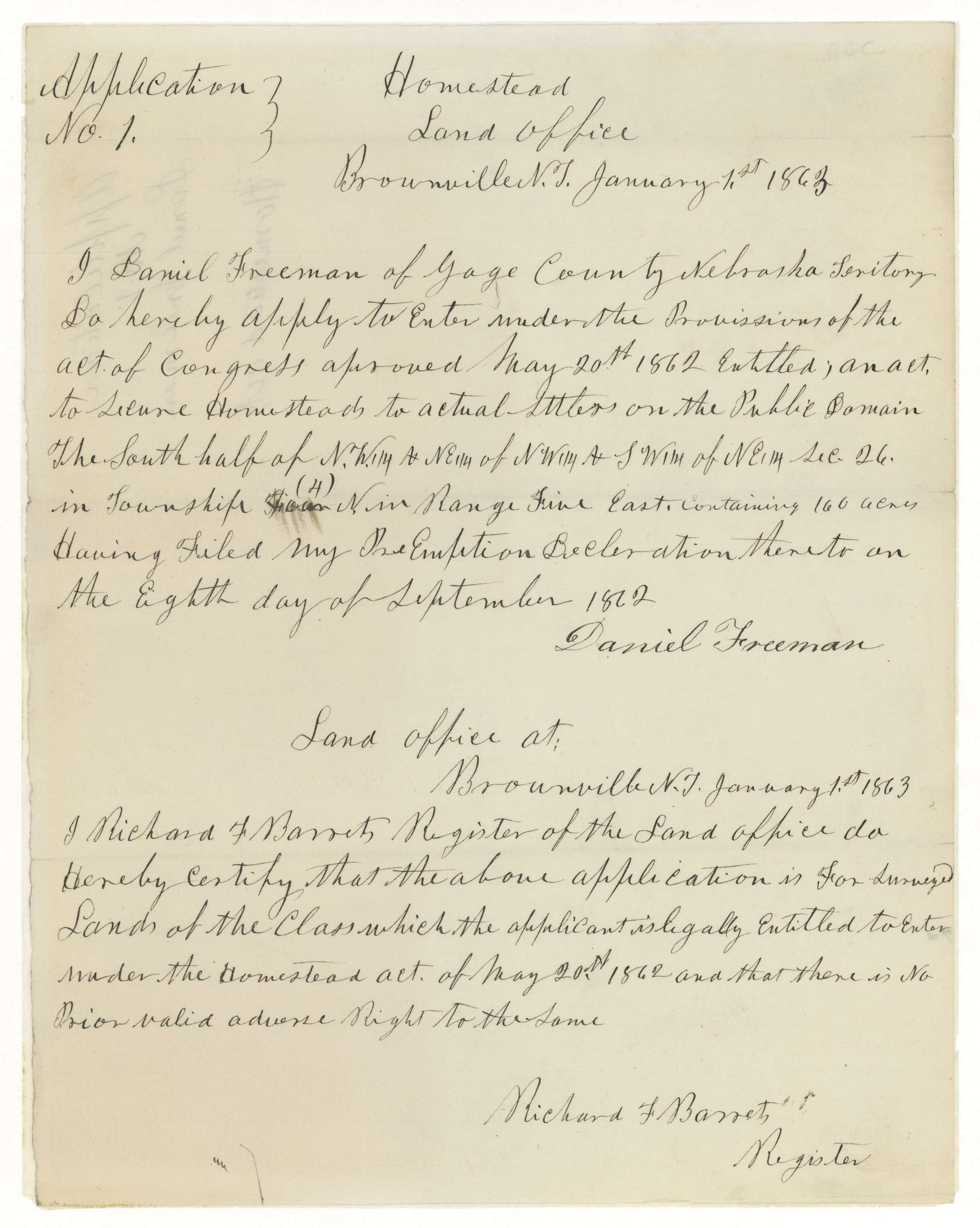
Daniel Freeman's homestead application

Daniel Freeman (April 26, 1826 – December 30, 1908) was an American homesteader and Civil War veteran. He was recognized as the first person to file a claim under the Homestead Act of 1862.

Freeman was also the plaintiff in a landmark separation of church and state decision.

== Physician and soldier ==
Freeman was born in Preble County, Ohio, and was raised in Genesee County, New York, and Knox County, Illinois. While he was a young man, his family moved frequently, to Iowa and Illinois before settling in Beatrice, Nebraska Territory. He was a graduate of a medical institute in Cincinnati, Ohio, and practiced medicine in Ottawa, Illinois. He enlisted in the 17th Illinois Volunteer Infantry Regiment during the Civil War.

== Homesteader ==
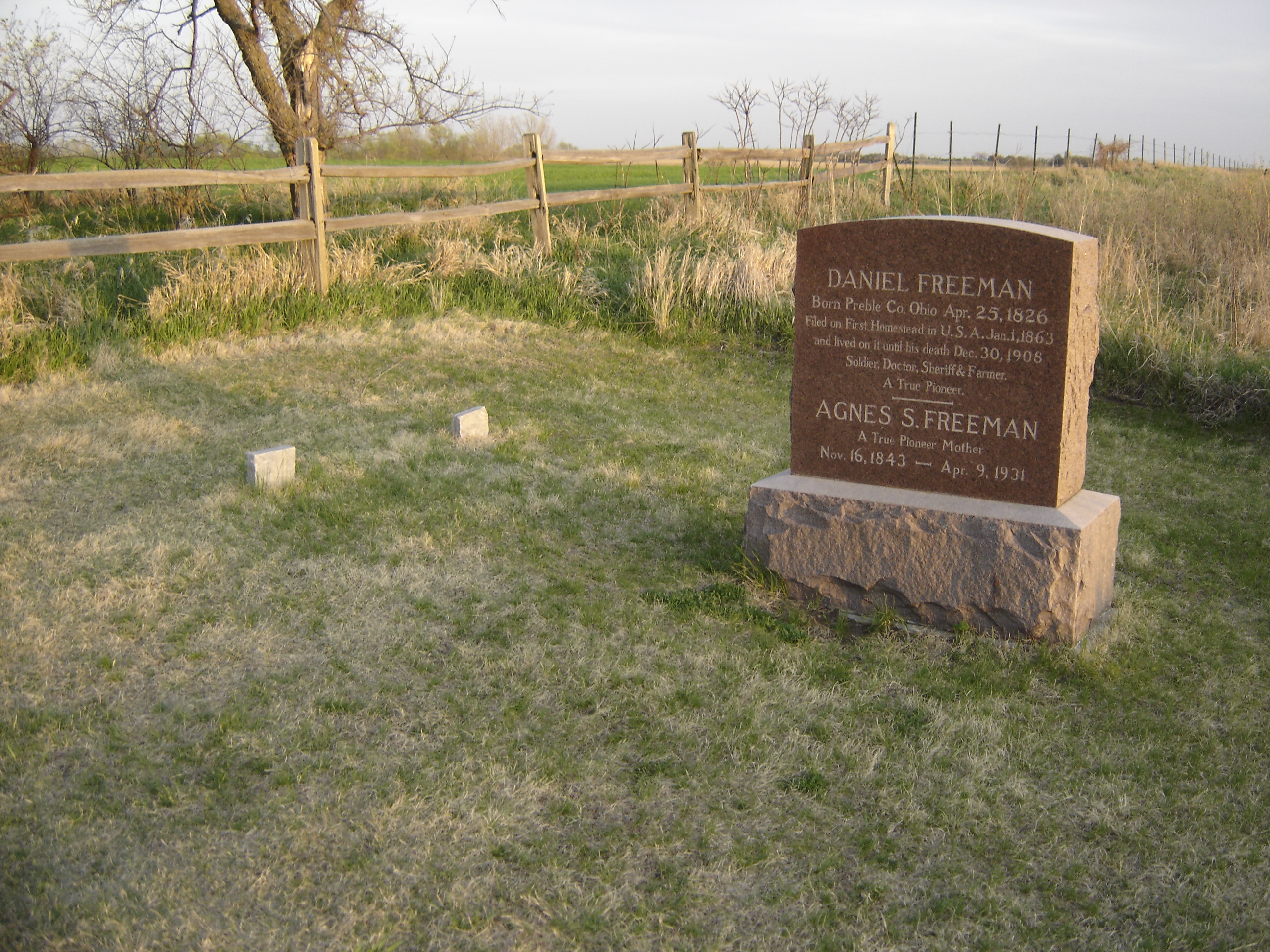
The grave of Daniel and Agnes Freeman at the Homestead National Historical Park.

On May 20, 1862, President Abraham Lincoln signed the Homestead Act, which gave adults 160 acres (0.65 km^{2}) of land if they filed paperwork and paid a small fee. The homesteader was required to build a 12x14-foot dwelling and farm the land for five years or plant trees.

Although the land was cheap or free, many homesteaders did not last five years because of the blizzards, drought, disease, plagues of locusts, and loneliness on the open prairies. January 1, 1863, was the day the Homestead Act went into effect. Freeman may have been a scouter for the Union Army, and he said that he was leaving for St. Louis that morning for military duty. Freeman persuaded a clerk to open the land office just after midnight so he could file his claim.

When five years was up, the homesteader had to have two or three witnesses sign a document called "Proof Required Under Homestead Acts May 20, 1862 . . . " Freeman had his neighbors, Joseph Graff and Samuel Kilpatrick, sign this first document.

== Marriages ==
Freeman married Elizabeth Wilber, who may have died in 1861, though some sources indicate that they divorced. They had three children.

Daniel Freeman proposed marriage by mail to Agnes Suiter of LeClaire, Iowa, and married her on February 8, 1865, in her parents' home. Agnes had been engaged to Daniel's younger brother, James, who was killed in the war. Daniel and Agnes had eight children, seven of whom survived to adulthood. Agnes lived on the Beatrice homestead until her death in 1931.

In addition to homesteading his claim, Freeman was a physician, county coroner, and county sheriff. During their homesteading period, several structures were built, including a log cabin, a brick house, and several frame houses. None survive. In 1936, the Freeman homestead was recognized by Congress as the first homestead in the country and designated as Homestead National Monument of America. It is now maintained by the National Park Service.

== Religious separation case ==
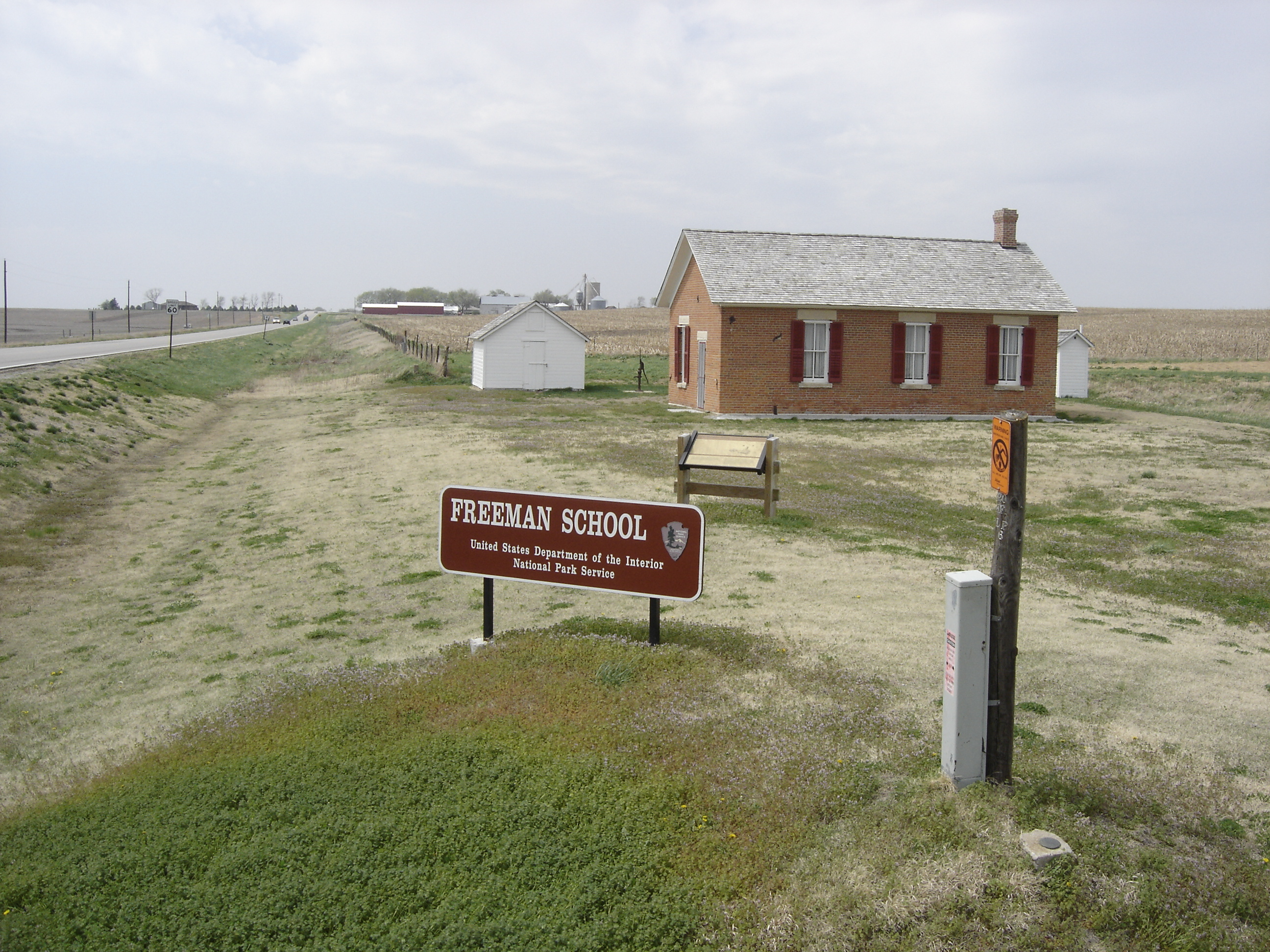
The Freeman school.

Freeman was the plaintiff in Daniel Freeman v. John Scheve, et al., a landmark case concerning the separation of church and state. In 1899, Edith Beecher, the teacher at the nearby Freeman School, was giving religious instruction, including reading passages from the Bible, offering prayers, and leading hymns. (It is not known if this school was named after Daniel Freeman or for Thomas Freeman, an unrelated brick maker and president of the local school board.) Freeman requested that Beecher stop, but she refused, claiming that she had permission from the school board. Freeman then took his complaint to the school board, which backed Beecher.

Freeman filed suit in Gage County District Court, which found in favor of the school board. Freeman appealed, finally going to the Nebraska Supreme Court, which found that the actions of Beecher and the school board were unconstitutional under the Nebraska Constitution provisions (Article I-4) concerning the separation of church and state.
