= Beatrice Municipal Auditorium =

- U.S. National Register of Historic Places
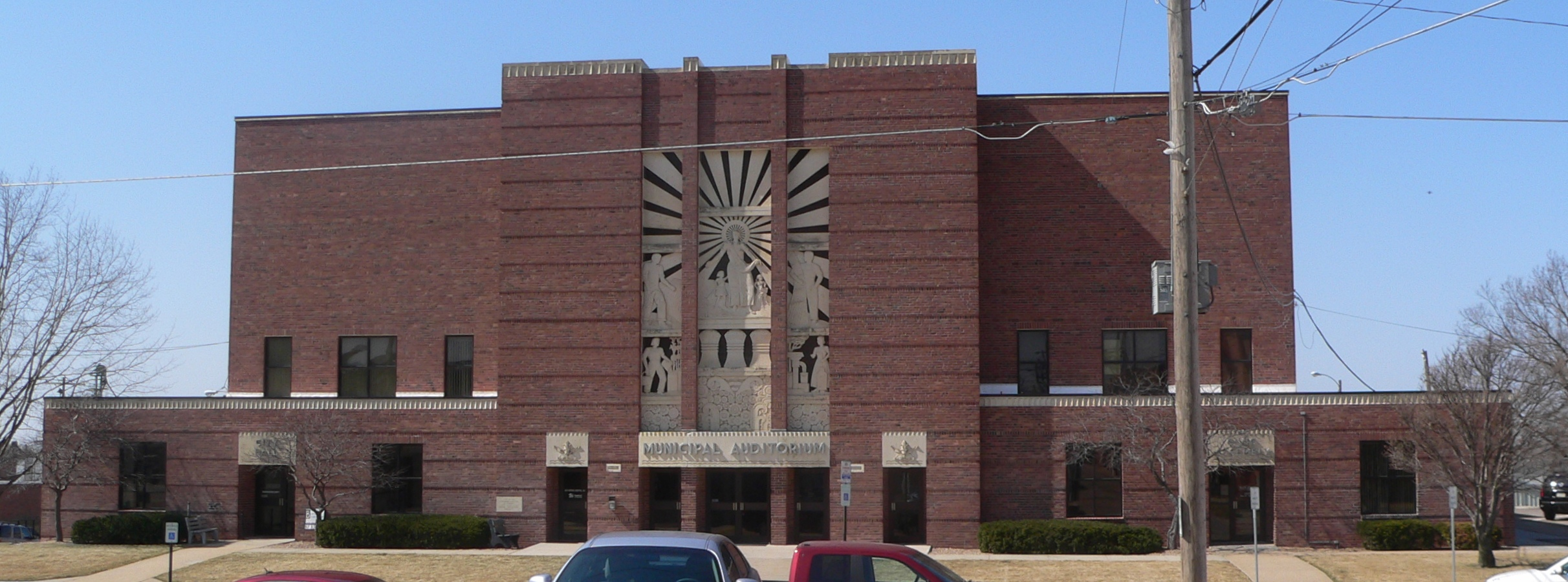
- The building in 2012

- Location within Nebraska Location within the United States
- Location: 205 North 4th Street, Beatrice, Nebraska
- Coordinates: 40°16′02″N 96°44′59″W
- Area: less than one acre
- Built: 1940
- Architect: Fred Organ
- Architectural style: Art Deco
- NRHP reference No.: 05001293
- Added to NRHP: November 16, 2005

The Beatrice Municipal Auditorium is a historic two-story building in Beatrice, Nebraska. It was built in 1940 as part of the New Deal's Public Works Administration, and designed in the Art Deco style by architect Fred Organ. It has been listed on the National Register of Historic Places since November 16, 2005.
