= Homestead Harmonizers =

Choir

The Homestead Harmonizers is a chorus created in response to a charter to operate a barbershop chorus in Beatrice, Nebraska issued on December 12, 1988, by the Society for the Preservation and Encouragement of Barber Shop Quartet Singing in America, Inc. The members of the Homestead Harmonizers range in age as young as the early teens to 80 plus years, including men from 23 different communities in southeast Nebraska and northeast Kansas.

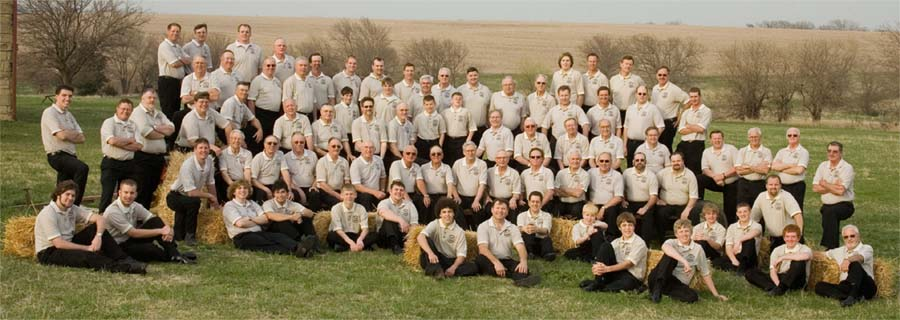
The Homestead Harmonizers

The Homestead Harmonizers are part of a district known as the Central States District. The five-state district includes chapters from Iowa, Kansas, Missouri, Nebraska and South Dakota. Every year the chapters meet in contest at a different host city within the five state area. The contests are critiqued very closely by judges that look for many areas including quality of sound, balance, perfection and harmony. The Homestead Harmonizers won the contest in 1994. In the Central States District Chorus Finals, held in Wichita, Kansas, on October 7, 2006, the Homestead Harmonizers received 5th place in the AAA category and also received the award for Central States District Most Improved Plateau AAA Chorus.

In the 2005 National Membership Drive, the Barbershop Harmony Society awarded the Homestead Harmonizers with the Grand Prize for numeric growth (34 new members) and also 3rd place for percentage of increase (57%).

The Harmonizers meet for practice every Monday evening. They are constantly trying to improve their singing abilities on both a personal basis and as a group. It is certainly to the individuals advantage to be able to read and understand music, however, it is not absolutely necessary. Several members of the chorus have little or no formal music training.

During the months of May through August, the chorus performs at many different churches throughout the area, ranging from 8 to 10 each summer. The performance can be anything from singing a few numbers to conducting a full sermon type of performance.

Since its inception, the Homestead Harmonizers have put together an annual concert which is widely anticipated in the Beatrice area. The shows are very professional and include a quartet from throughout the U.S. Often, the quartets are national champions.
