= Beatrice Six =

Six wrongfully convicted in 1989 in United States

The Beatrice Six are Joseph White, Thomas Winslow, Ada JoAnn Taylor, Debra Shelden, James Dean and Kathy Gonzalez, who were falsely found guilty in 1989 of the 1985 rape and murder of Helen Wilson in Beatrice, Nebraska and served prison terms before being exonerated in 2009.

The conviction was one of five confessions which were obtained under threats that they would be given the death penalty if they did not. Additionally, Dr. Reena Roy, the Nebraska State Patrol forensic scientist who performed blood and semen analysis, was never called to the stand to testify during the case, despite her analysis determining that none of the defendants on trial were a specific match to blood or semen found at the scene. In 2008, DNA evidence implicated Bruce Allen Smith, an original prime suspect in the murder who had died in 1992, and all of the Beatrice Six were exonerated the following year.

Most of the defendants were persuaded by the police psychologist, Wayne Price, that they had repressed memories of the crime. White, who maintained his innocence, demanded the examination of DNA evidence that led to their exoneration and then filed a Federal civil rights lawsuit against Gage County, Nebraska on behalf of all six defendants, which went to trial in January 2014; White had by then died in a workplace accident in 2011. In July 2016, a jury awarded them $28 million. The county's appeal reached the Supreme Court of the United States, which declined to hear the case on March 4, 2019.

Gage County had to raise property taxes to the maximum amount permitted under the law in order to pay the jury award. It was expected that the county would make payments twice a year after property taxes were collected; the Beatrice Six, including the heirs of White, received their first payment in June 2019. The payments were completed in the span of four years, with the final payment occurring in March 2023 and the tax increases expiring in January 2023.

An HBO Original six-part documentary series about the Beatrice Six, the murder, investigation, trial, exoneration, civil suits and aftermath titled Mind Over Murder was released in 2022, with the first episode airing on Monday, June 20.

== See also ==
- List of wrongful convictions in the United States
- Nebraska Innocence Project
