= Paddock Hotel =

- U.S. National Register of Historic Places
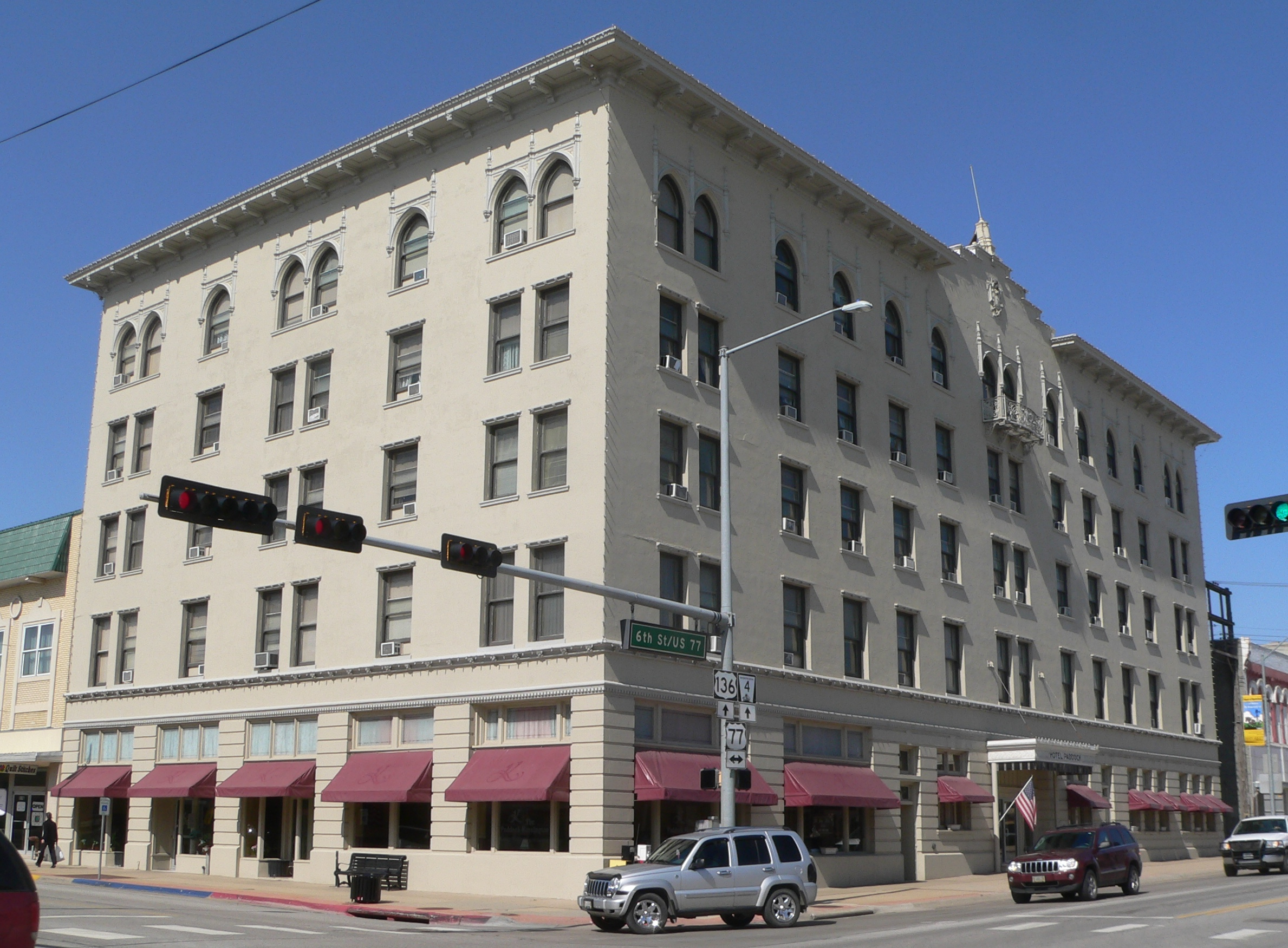
- The hotel in 2012

- Location within Nebraska Location within the United States
- Location: 105 North Sixth Street, Beatrice, Nebraska
- Coordinates: 40°15′58″N 96°44′49″W
- Area: less than one acre
- Built: 1924
- Architect: Thomas R. Kimball
- Architectural style: Renaissance Revival
- NRHP reference No.: 87002084
- Added to NRHP: November 30, 1987

The Paddock Hotel is a historic 110-room hotel building in Beatrice, Nebraska. It was built in 1924, and designed in the Renaissance Revival style by architect Thomas R. Kimball. According to its National Register of Historic Places Registration, "The entrance opens into a lobby with massive mahogany columns (now painted) rising from a mosaic tile floor to coffered ceilings at the second story. A marble staircase leads to the mezzanine area where decorative metal balustrades overlook the lobby." The hotel was turned into a retirement facility in 1970. It has been listed on the National Register of Historic Places since November 30, 1987.
