= Lake Bridenthal House =

United States historic place

- U.S. National Register of Historic Places
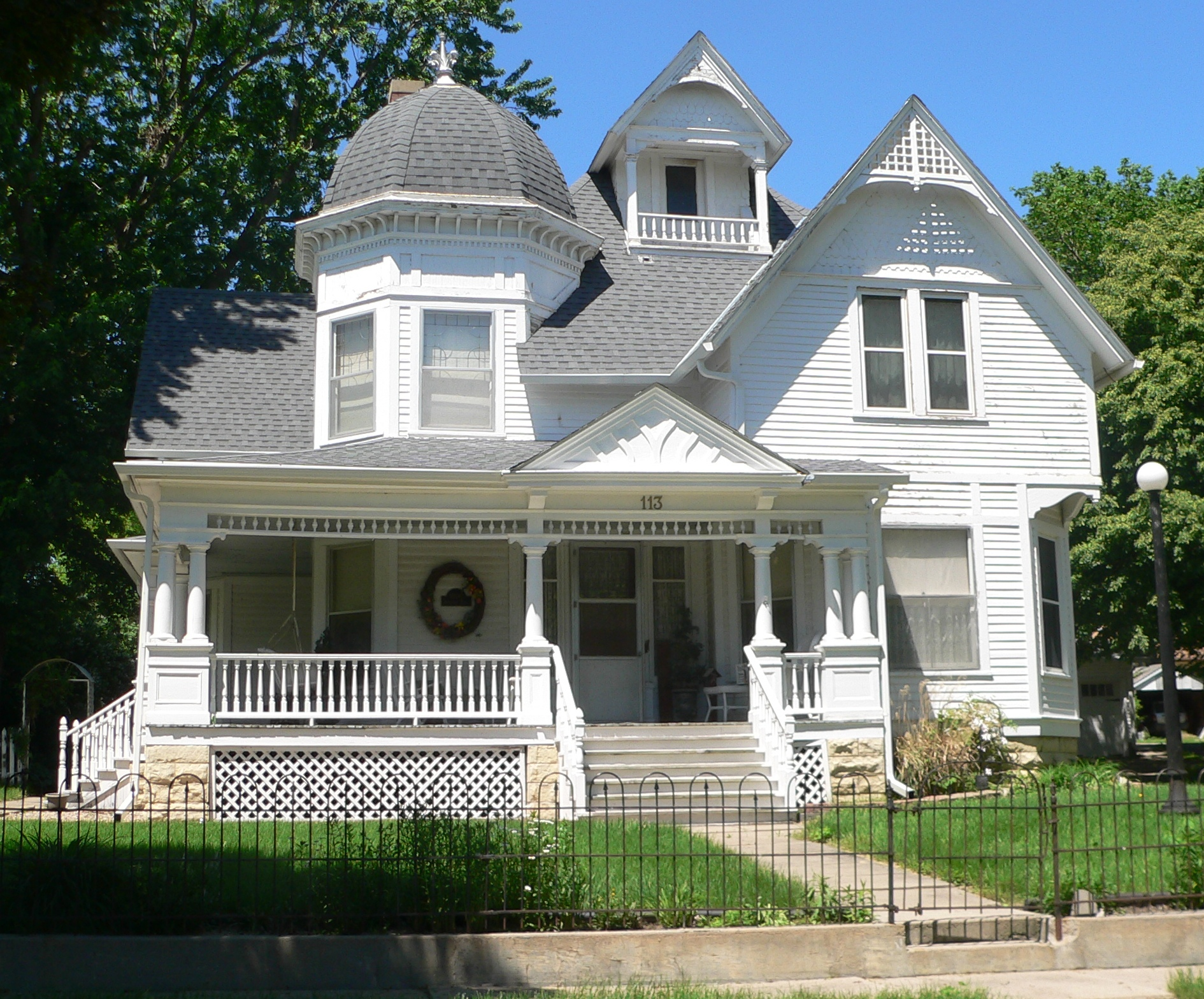
- The house in 2013

- Location within Nebraska Location within the United States
- Location: 113 South 9th Street, Wymore, Nebraska
- Coordinates: 40°07′18″N 96°39′53″W
- Area: less than one acre
- Built: 1900
- Architectural style: Queen Anne
- NRHP reference No.: 83001095
- Added to NRHP: February 24, 1983

The Lake Bridenthal House is a historic house in Wymore, Nebraska. It was built in 1900 for Lake Bridenthal, a banker, merchant and farmer who died in 1942. It was designed in the Queen Anne architectural style, with a turret and a domed roof. It has been listed on the National Register of Historic Places since February 24, 1983.
