= Homestead National Historical Park =

National park in Nebraska, U.S.

- U.S. National Register of Historic Places
- U.S. National Historical Park
- Former U.S. National Monument
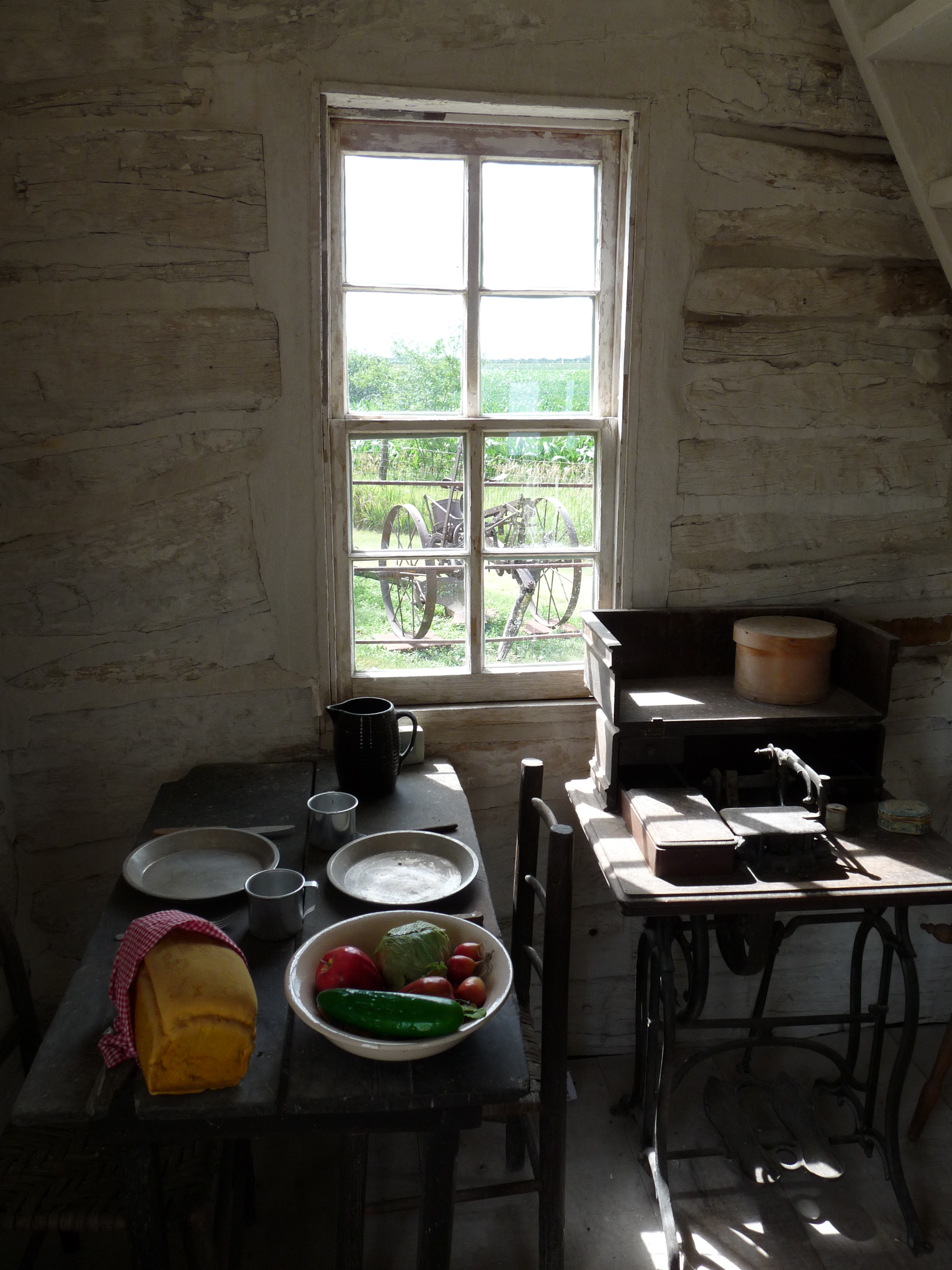
- Inside the Palmer-Epard cabin, with a treadle sewing machine at right and a corn planter out the window

- Location within Nebraska Location within the United States
- Location: Gage County, Nebraska, United States
- Nearest city: Beatrice, Nebraska
- Coordinates: 40°17′07″N 96°49′19″W
- Area: 211 acres (85 ha)
- Visitation: 43,099 (2025)
- Website: www.nps.gov/home/
- NRHP reference No.: 66000115

Significant dates
- Added to NRHP: October 15, 1966
- Designated NHP: January 13, 2021
- Designated NMON: March 19, 1936

Homestead National Historical Park, a unit of the National Park System known as the Homestead National Monument of America prior to 2021, commemorates passage of the Homestead Act of 1862, which allowed any qualified person to claim up to 160 acres (0.65 km^{2}) of federally owned land in exchange for five years of residence and the cultivation and improvement of the property. The Act eventually transferred 270,000,000 acres (1,100,000 km^{2}) from public to private ownership.

The park is five miles (8 km) west of Beatrice, Nebraska, on a site that includes some of the first acres successfully claimed under the Homestead Act. The national monument was first included in the National Register of Historic Places in 1966. In 2015, the United States Mint released a commemorative quarter as part of the America the Beautiful series honoring the park.

== Homestead Heritage Center and Education Center ==
The Homestead Heritage Center, dedicated in 2007, contains exhibits that treat the effect of the Homestead Act on immigration, agriculture, native tribes, the tallgrass prairie ecosystem, and federal land policy. The roof line of the center resembles a "single bottom plow moving through the sod," and the parking lot measures exactly one-acre (4,000 m^{2}). A separate Education Center features science and social science presentations that can be shared with classrooms anywhere in the United States through distance-learning.

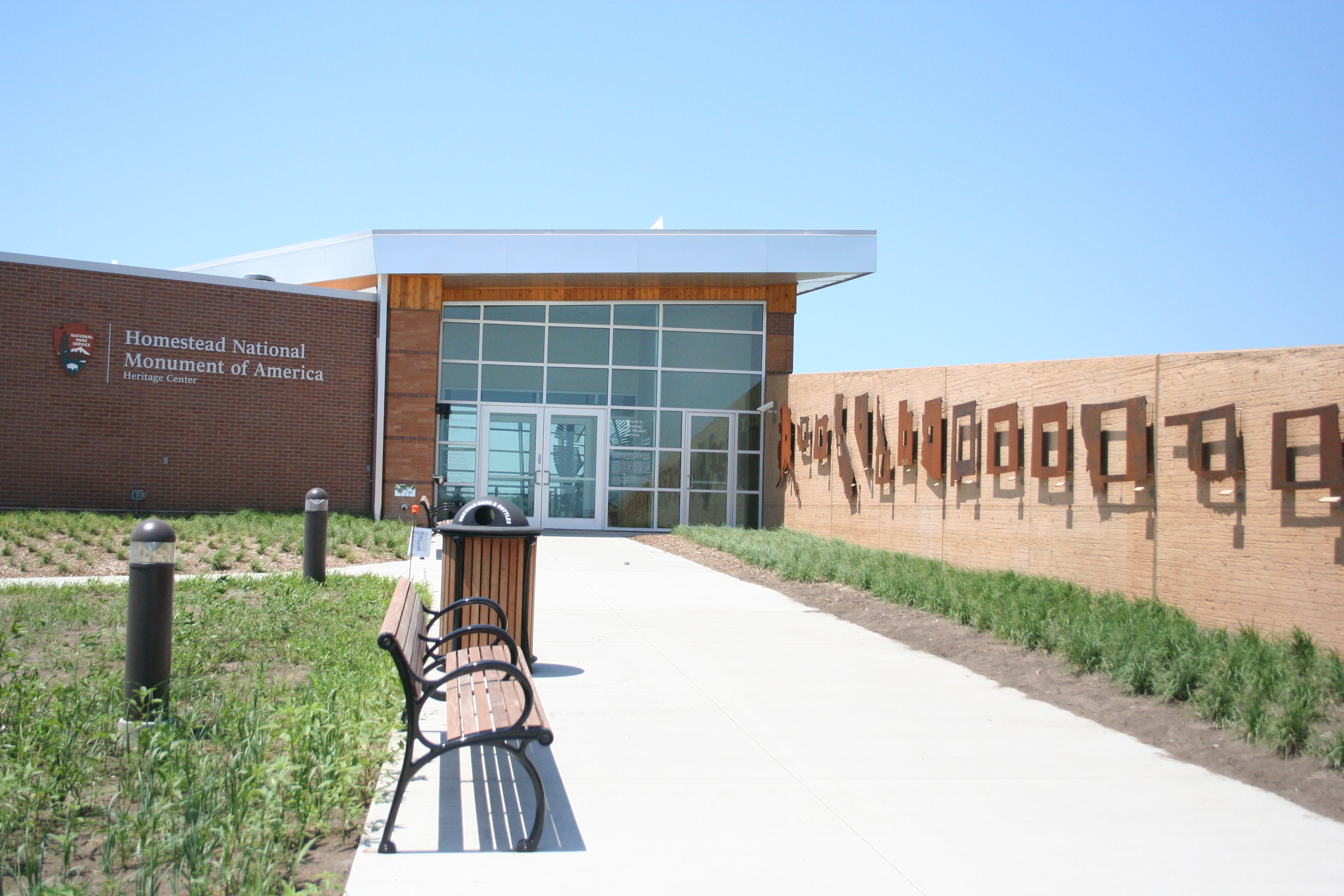
Heritage Center entrance

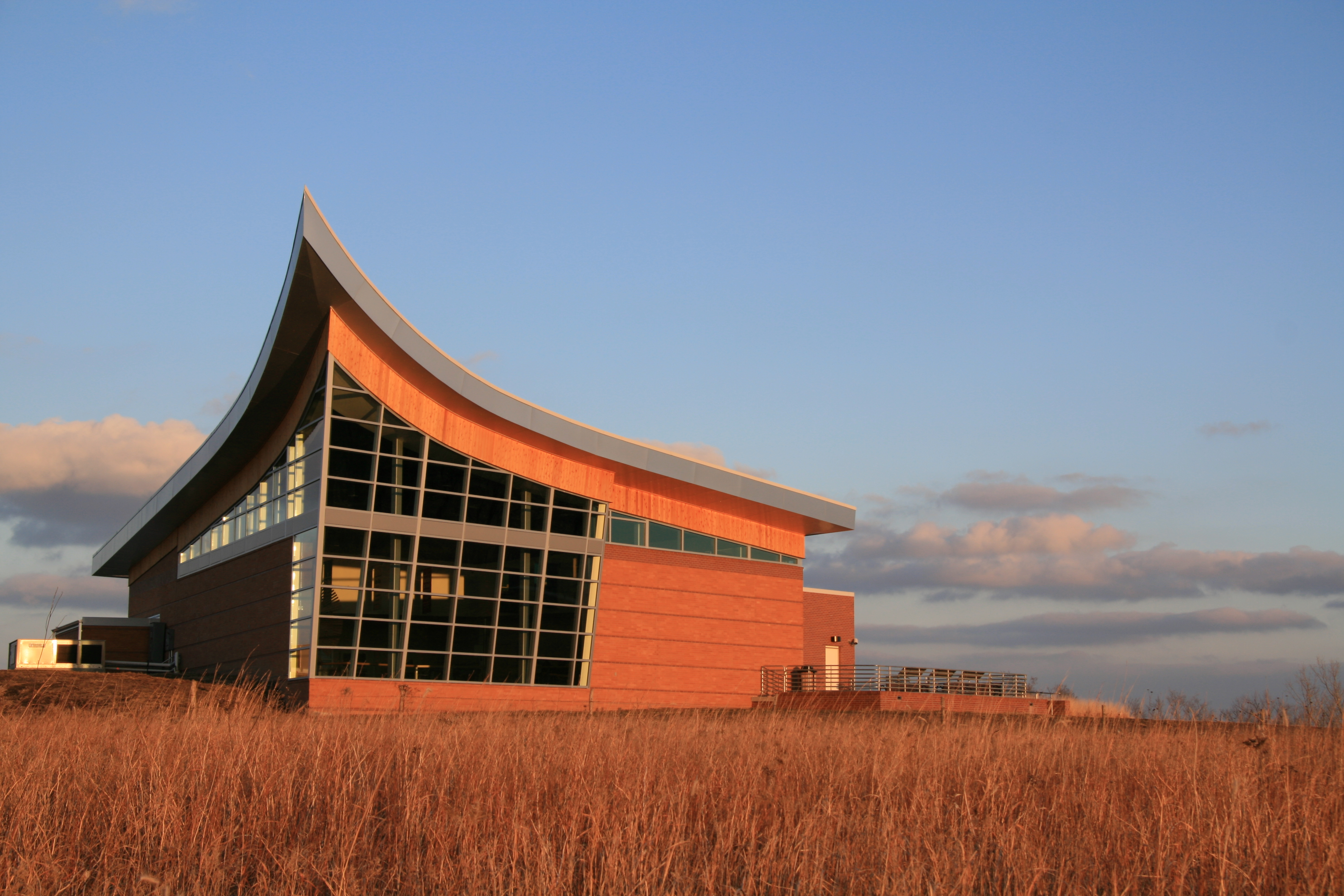
Heritage Center

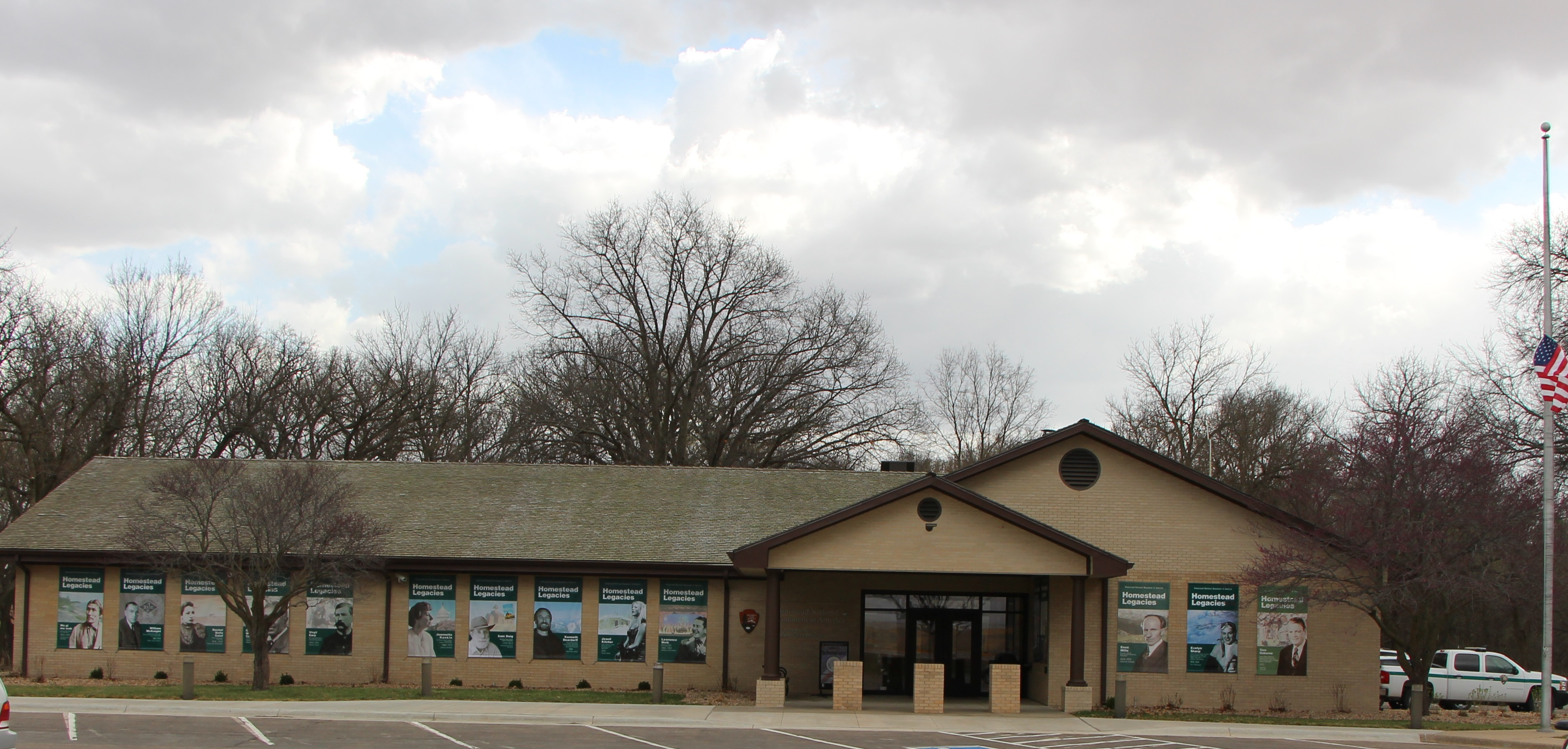
Education Center

== Tallgrass prairie ==
The park includes 100 acres (0.40 km^{2}) of tallgrass prairie restored to approximate the ecosystem that once covered the central plains of the United States—and that was nearly plowed into extinction by the homesteaders. This restoration, which necessitates regular mowing, haying, and prescribed burns, has been managed by the National Park Service for more than 60 years and is the oldest in the National Park System. The park maintains about 2.7 miles (4.3 km) of hiking trails through the prairie and the woodland surrounding Cub Creek, accessible via all-terrain wheelchair.

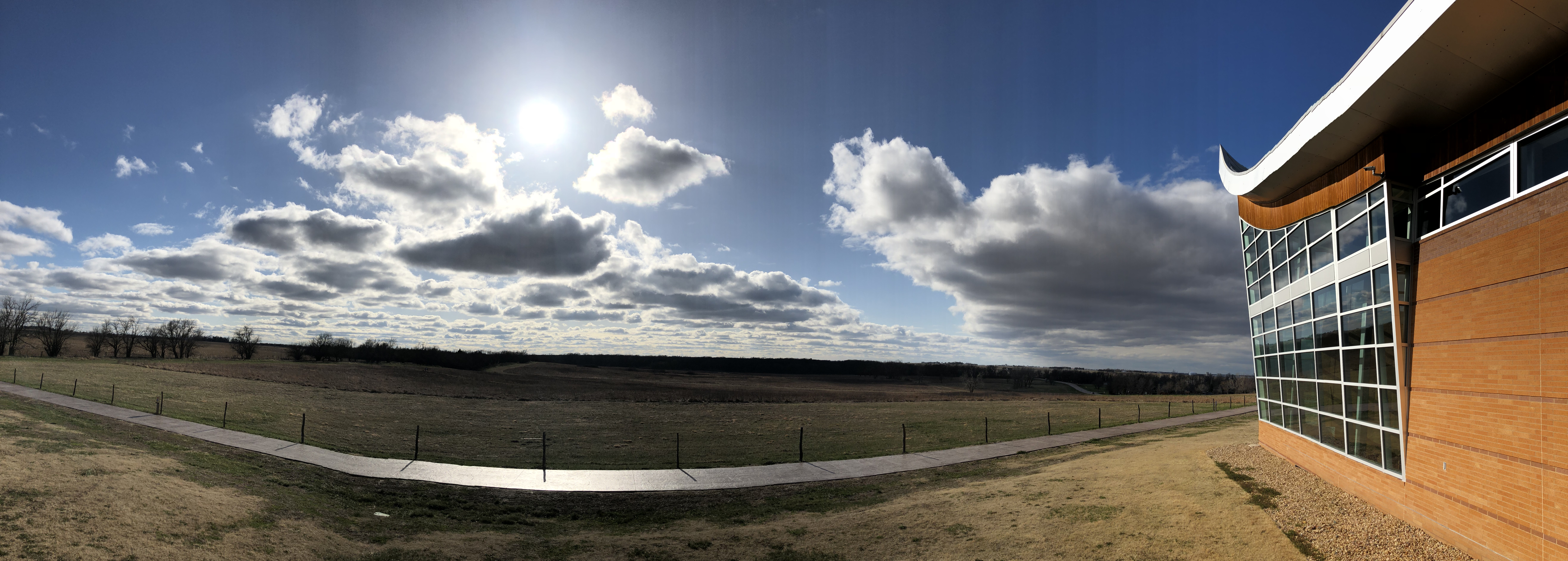
The Homestead Heritage Center overlooks the 100 acres of restored Tallgrass prairie found at Homestead National Historical Park. A three-mile (4.8 km) trail system winding through the prairie allows further exploration of this ecosystem.

== Palmer-Epard Cabin ==
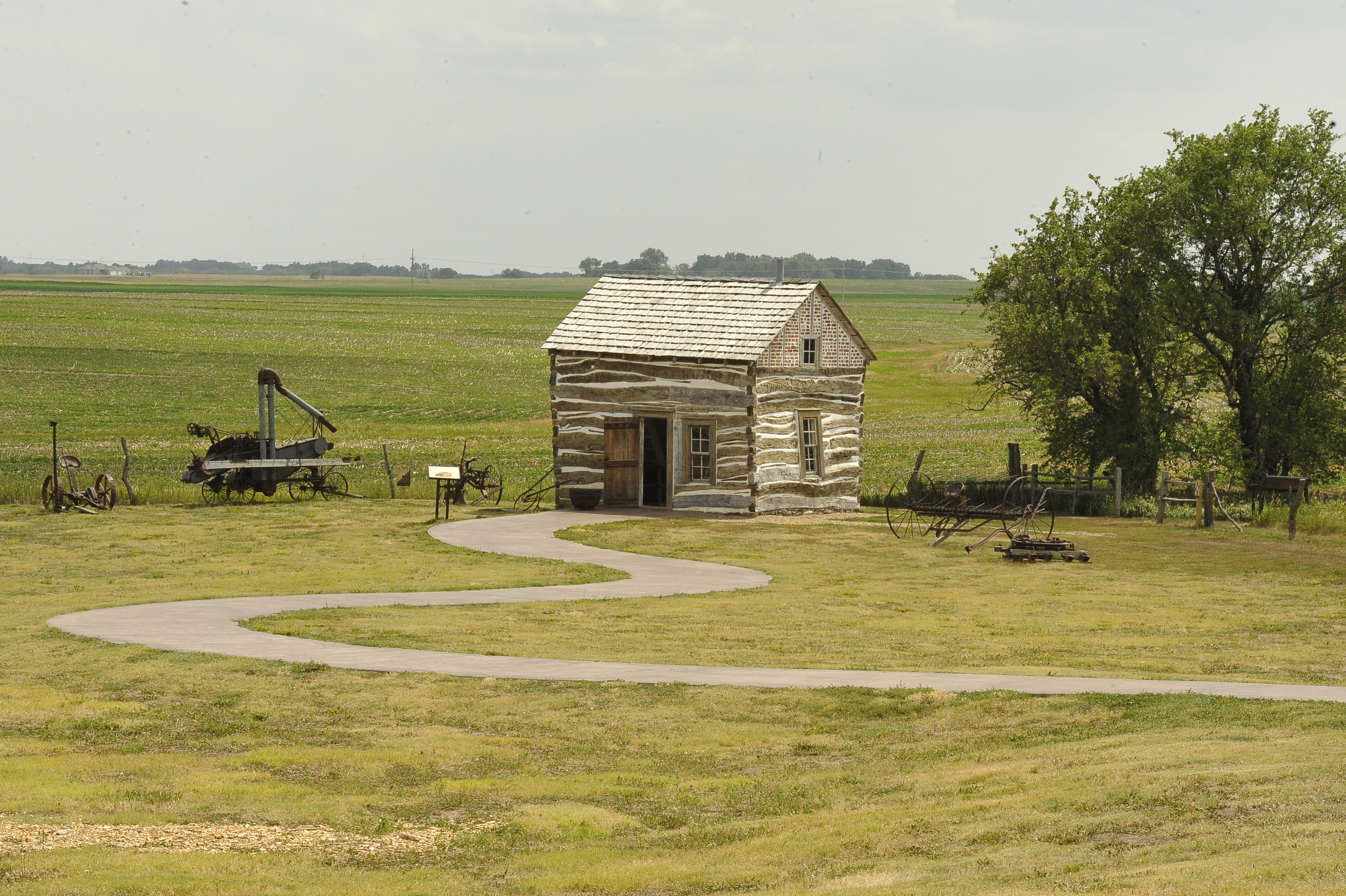
Palmer-Epard Cabin

In 1867, George W. Palmer built the Palmer-Epard Cabin from mixed hardwoods about 14 miles (23 km) northeast of the park. It measures 14 by 16 feet (4.3 m × 4.9 m) and is representative of the local construction style. Palmer lived in the cabin with his wife and ten children. Between 1875 and 1880, a 10-by-12-foot (3.0 m × 3.7 m) lean-to was added to the rear of the cabin, and the Palmers continued to live in it until 1895, when it was sold to nephews Eugene Mumford and William Foreman. A few years later, the farm was sold to Lawrence and Ida Mumford Epard, who lived in the cabin for nearly 40 years. The cabin was donated to the park in 1950 and has been moved and restored several times in intervening years.

== Freeman School ==
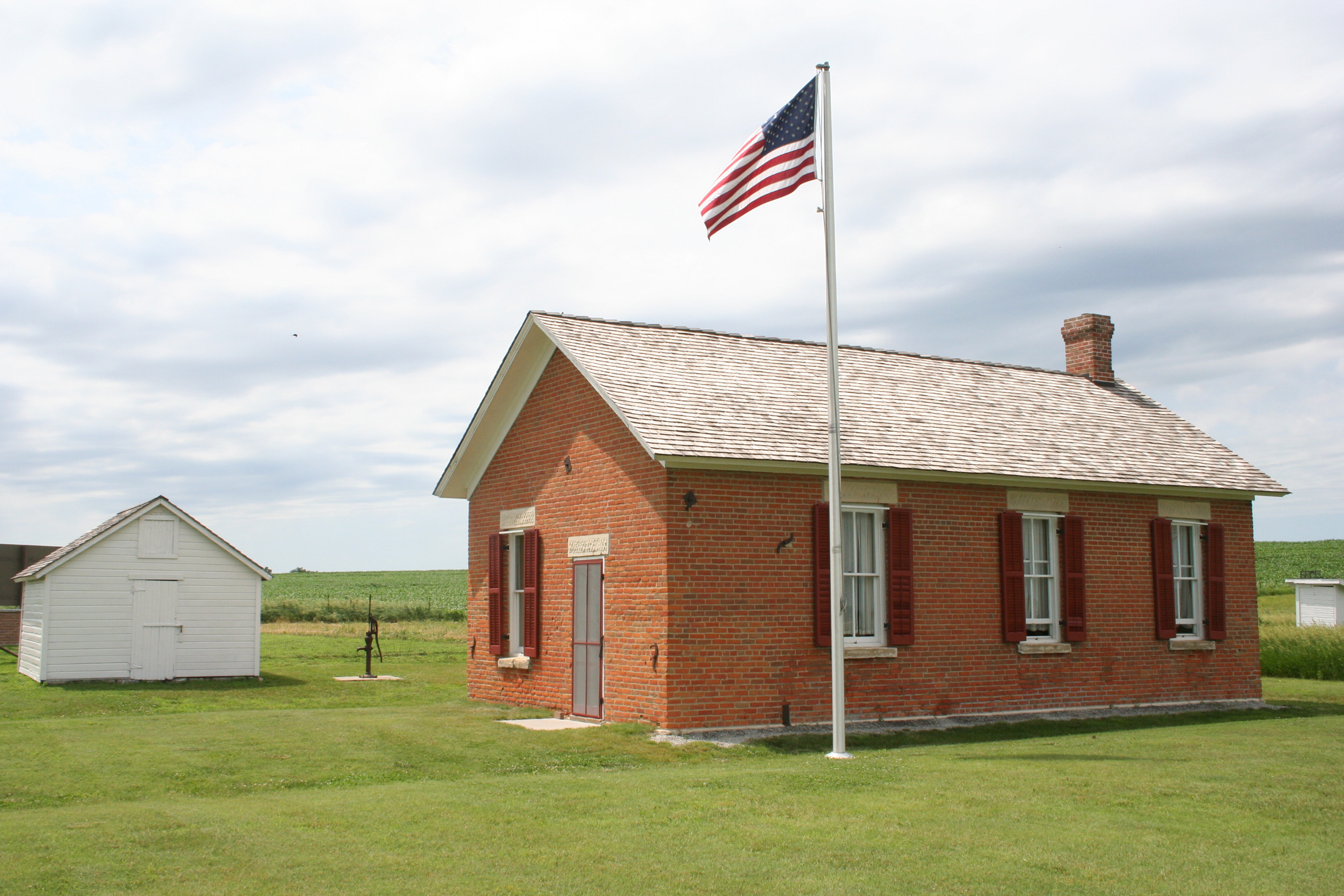
The Freeman School. A historic one-room school at Homestead National Historical Park. 40°17′32.54″N 96°50′31.18″W

The Freeman School, built of foot-thick red brick with carved limestone lintels, was the longest continuously used one-room school in Nebraska (1872–1967). The school also served as a Lutheran church, a polling place for Blakely Township, and a community center for debates, clubs, and box socials. The National Park Service restored the school to appear as it did during the 1870s.

The Freeman School was the focus of an early, influential judicial decision regarding separation of church and state. In 1899, Daniel Freeman sued the school board after a teacher, Edith Beecher, refused to stop praying, reading the Bible, and singing gospel songs in her classroom. In Freeman v. Scheve, et al. (1902), the Nebraska Supreme Court ruled that Beecher's activities violated provisions of the Nebraska constitution.

== Farm equipment displays ==
Old farm equipment can be viewed at the education center and near the Palmer-Epard Cabin, including planters, reapers, mowers and hay stackers, to name a few. Some of the old equipment is accompanied by videos of how it was used. Other displays show the progression of mechanization; e.g. from hand-broadcasting wheat, to a hurdy-gurdy, to an early seed drill.

== Administrative history ==
Daniel Freeman (1826–1908), a native of Ohio, filed the first homestead claim in the Brownville, Nebraska land office on January 1, 1863. By the mid-1880s, Freeman also claimed to have been the first homesteader in the nation. Freeman eventually amassed more than 1,000 acres (4.0 km^{2}) and became a prominent citizen of Gage County. As early as 1884, he first proposed the idea of memorializing himself as the earliest homesteader, and shortly after his death in 1908, Beatrice residents talked of preserving his homestead as a national park.

Proposals to create such a park were rejected until during the mid-1920s, the influential Senator George W. Norris suggested a historical museum of agricultural implements be established on the Freeman property and the local chapter of the Daughters of the American Revolution dedicated a marker there.

In 1934, Beatrice citizens organized the National Homestead Park Association, reinvigorating the movement. In 1935, Norris and newly elected congressman Henry C. Luckey of Lincoln introduced legislation to create the Homestead National Monument of America, which eventually became law in March 1936. But federal funding for the purchase was not obtained until March 1938. Negotiations with the Freeman heirs "dragged on for months over the value of the land," and condemnation proceedings were instigated to bring them to terms. The government took possession at the end of the year.

A few improvements were made to the site before American entrance into World War II effectively ended both visitation and development. In the 1950s, the National Park Service acquired the Palmer-Epard cabin and built a visitor center as part of its Mission 66 program. A small museum there exhibited some of the artifacts donated to the park by the Gage County Historical Society in 1948. By 1981 the national monument had five permanent employees, one part-time employee, and some seasonal personnel.

In the 1970s and '80s, seasonal rangers presented living history demonstrations, although many of their activities were later viewed as "not historically accurate for the homestead era" and "more reminiscent of the Appalachian hill country than prairie homesteads." Beginning in 1992, under the direction of Superintendent Constantine Dillon, the direction of the park was redirected from focusing on the prairie restoration to a broader commemoration of the Homestead Act and its consequences nationwide. Dillon initiated a new management plan for the park and planning for a new heritage center. Under Superintendent Mark Engler, a Beatrice native, the national monument dedicated the Homestead Heritage Center in 2007 with more interactive displays that treated the Homestead Act from a broader prospective, a change symbolized in part by a "Living Wall" at its entrance with a physical representation of the percentage of land successfully homesteaded in each state. The monument was renamed to Homestead National Historical Park in 2021.
