= Mind Over Murder (TV series) =

2022 American documentary tv miniseries

- Genre: Documentary
- Directed by: Nanfu Wang
- Country of origin: United States
- Original language: English
- No. of episodes: 6

Production
- Executive producers: Nanfu Wang; Marc Smerling; Max Heckman; Chad Mumm; Mark W. Olsen; Nancy Abraham; Lisa Heller; Sara Rodriguez
- Producers: Alexander Baertl; Scott Curtis
- Cinematography: Jarred Alterman
- Editors: Keiko Deguchi; Joe Langford; Josh Melrod; Michael Shade
- Running time: 52 minutes
- Production companies: HBO Documentary Films; Vox Media Studios; Little Horse Crossing the River; Truth.Media

Original release
- Network: HBO
- Release: June 20 – July 25, 2022

Mind Over Murder is a 2022 American documentary television miniseries revolving around the Beatrice Six, directed by Nanfu Wang. It consists of 6 episodes and premiered on June 20, 2022, on HBO.

== Plot ==
The series follows the complex story of the Beatrice Six, who were convicted in 1989 of the 1985 rape and murder of Helen Wilson. In 2009, the six were exonerated by DNA evidence, despite five of them originally confessing to the crime when a police psychologist convinced them that they were experiencing repressed memory.

== Episodes ==
| No. | Title | Directed by | Original release date | Viewers (millions) |
|---|---|---|---|---|
| 1 | "Episode 1" | Nanfu Wang | June 20, 2022 | 0.119 |
| 2 | "Episode 2" | Nanfu Wang | June 27, 2022 | 0.094 |
| 3 | "Episode 3" | Nanfu Wang | July 4, 2022 | 0.065 |
| 4 | "Episode 4" | Nanfu Wang | July 11, 2022 | 0.077 |
| 5 | "Episode 5" | Nanfu Wang | July 18, 2022 | 0.064 |
| 6 | "Episode 6" | Nanfu Wang | July 25, 2022 | 0.098 |

== Production ==
After Nanfu Wang completed her first film Hooligan Sparrow, Wang showed the film to the main subject. Realizing some of the subject's memories were not true, Wang found this fascinating. In 2017, Wang read an article about the Beatrice Six, and was intrigued by their story, and wanted to explore it as a filmmaker. Previously the six were approached by other filmmakers to make films or television series, but declined. Wang first traveled to Beatrice in 2019, taking time to build trust within the community, and consulting with the defense attorney who represented the six, once they began to know Wang's intentions, she gained access to those close to the story.

In June 2022, it was announced Wang had directed a documentary series revolving around the Beatrice Six, which HBO Documentary Films and Vox Media Studios produced, and distributed by HBO.

== Reception ==
On the review aggregator website Rotten Tomatoes, the series holds an approval rating of 100%, based on five reviews with an average rating of 9.40/10. On Metacritic, it has a score of 88 out of 100, based on six reviews, indicating "universal acclaim".
