= Melville D. Landon =

American journalist (1839–1910)

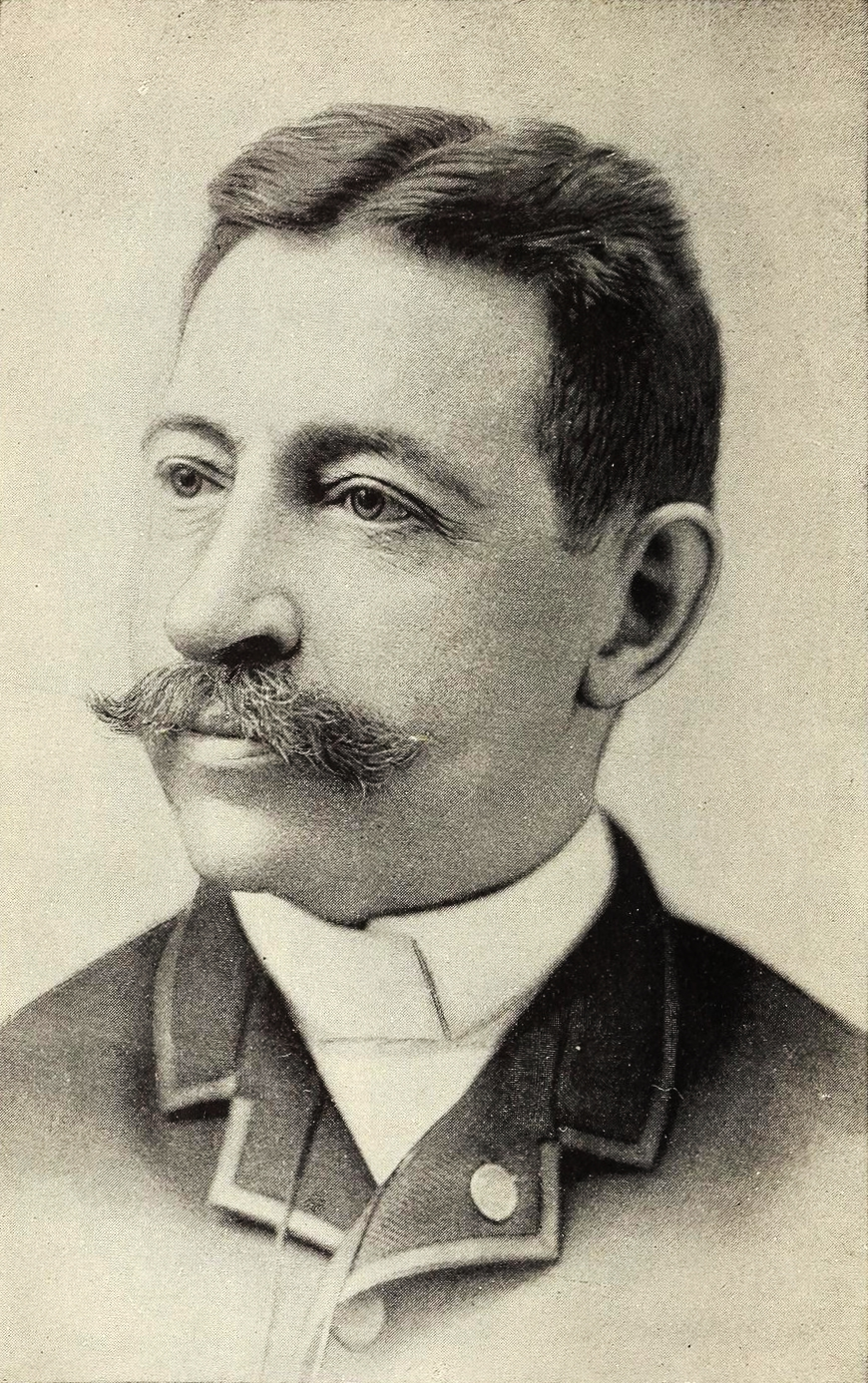
- Born: September 7, 1839; Eaton, New York
- Died: December 16, 1910 (aged 71); Yonkers, New York
- Education: Union College
- Writing career
- Pen name: Eli Perkins

Melville De Lancey Landon (1839–1910), also known by his pen name Eli Perkins, was an American humorist, lecturer, and journalist.

== Biography ==
Landon was born in Eaton, New York, in 1839, the son of John and Nancy Marsh Landon. He attended Madison University (now Colgate University) for one year, and graduated from Union College in 1861. After graduation, he obtained a position in the United States Treasury, and served in the Civil War under General Augustus Louis Chetlain. He left the army in 1864, and became a cotton planter in Louisiana and Arkansas. In 1867 he traveled abroad in Russia as secretary to Cassius M. Clay, Minister to Russia. He returned to the United States in 1870, and the following year published his first book, The Franco-Prussian War in a Nutshell. He wrote and compiled several books of humor, and was past president of the New York News Association. He died at his home in Yonkers, New York, on December 16, 1910, at the age of 71, after suffering from locomotor ataxia for some six years.
