= Beatrice, Nebraska =

- City
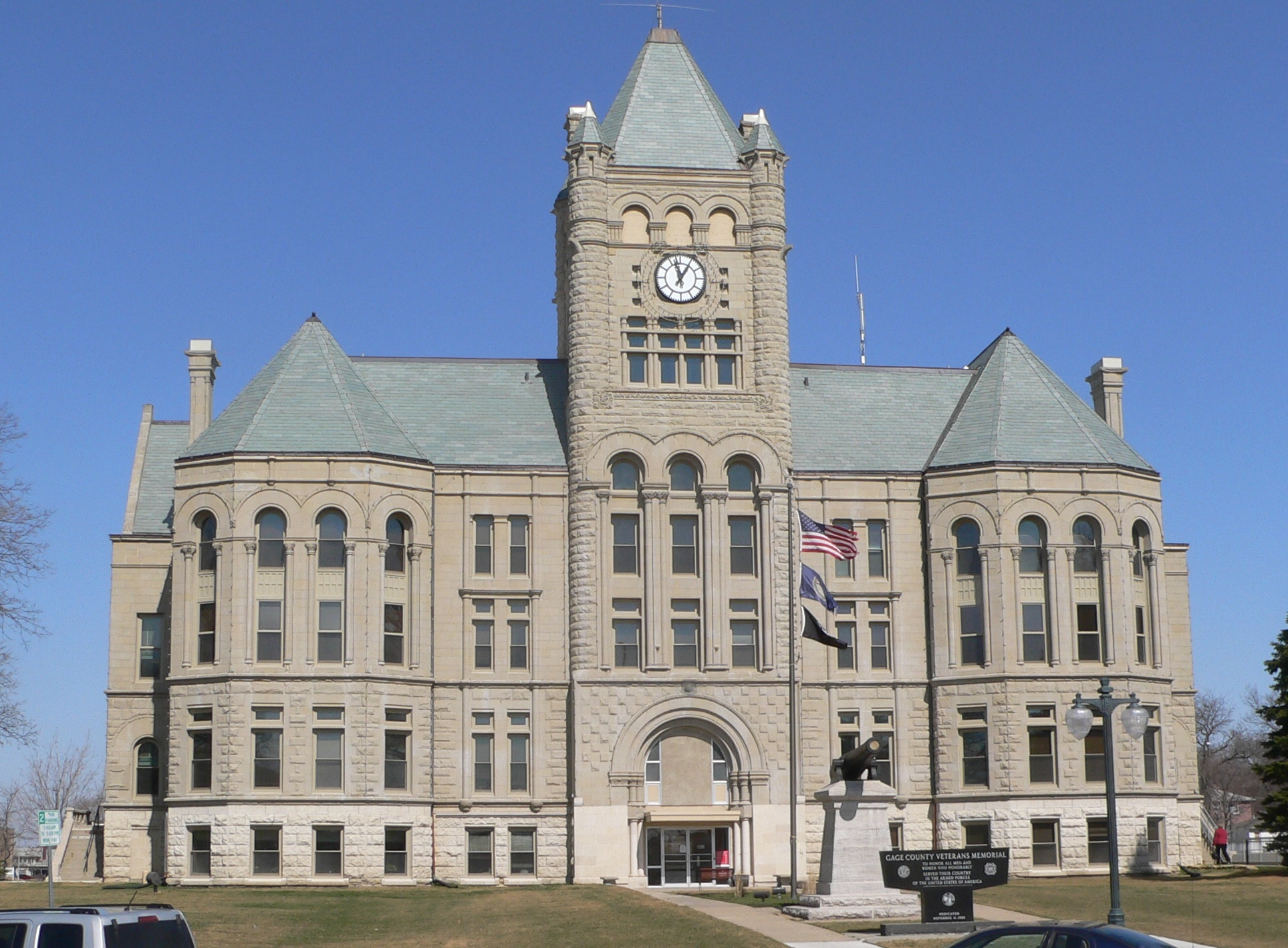
- Gage County Courthouse

- Location in Nebraska Beatrice (the United States) Beatrice (North America)
- Coordinates: 40°16′6″N 96°44′35″W
- Country: United States
- State: Nebraska
- County: Gage

Government
  - Type: Mayor-council government

Area
  - Total: 9.56 sq mi (24.76 km^{2})
  - Land: 9.48 sq mi (24.55 km^{2})
  - Water: 0.085 sq mi (0.22 km^{2})
- Elevation: 1,312 ft (400 m)

Population (2020)
  - Total: 12,261
  - Density: 1,293.7/sq mi (499.51/km^{2})
- Time zone: UTC-6 (Central (CST))
  - Summer (DST): UTC-5 (CDT)
- ZIP code: 68310
- Area code: 402
- FIPS code: 31-03390
- GNIS feature ID: 0837869
- Website: beatrice.ne.gov

Beatrice (/biˈætrɪs/) is a city in and the county seat of Gage County, Nebraska, United States. Its population was 12,261 at the 2020 census, making it the 15th most populous city in Nebraska. Beatrice is located approximately 42 miles south of Lincoln on the Big Blue River.

== History ==
Gage County was one of the 19 counties originally established by the Nebraska Territorial Legislature in 1854. At the time of its establishment, there were no settlers living within its boundaries.

In 1857, the steamboat Hannibal, carrying 300 passengers up the Missouri River from St. Louis, Missouri to Nebraska City, Nebraska, ran aground near Kansas City, Missouri. While it was stranded, 35 of the passengers agreed to form the "Nebraska Association", under which name they would unite in seeking a townsite and establishing a settlement in the territory.

After reaching Nebraska City, the Association divided itself into two exploratory parties, one of which went directly westward and the other southwest. The latter party located the site of Beatrice, at the point where the DeRoin Trail crossed the Big Blue River, and the whole Association decided to settle there. The settlement was named after Julia Beatrice Kinney, the 17-year-old daughter of Judge John F. Kinney, a member of the Association.

The Territorial Legislature selected Beatrice as the county seat of Gage County in 1857. The decision was challenged by Blue Springs, but was confirmed by the Legislature in 1859. In 1864, the Legislature dissolved the original Clay County (not the current Clay County, Nebraska), dividing its land between Gage and Lancaster Counties. The addition of this ground in the north placed Beatrice near the center of the enlarged county, strengthening its claim to the county seat. It continues to hold that position today.

=== Homestead Act ===
In 1862, the U.S. Congress passed the Homestead Act, which allowed settlers to claim 160 acres (65 ha) of government land for a nominal fee. The law went into effect on January 1, 1863. Just after midnight on that day, Daniel Freeman persuaded a clerk to open the local Land Office so that he could file a claim for a homestead located 4 miles (6 km) west of Beatrice. His is regarded as the first of the 417 applications filed that day.

In 1936, Congress created Homestead National Monument of America on the site of Freeman's claim.

=== Early development ===
The Big Blue River was both a help and a hindrance to the development of Beatrice. It provided the town with a water source, and produced ample power to operate the mills that were among the town's first industries. However, it represented a major obstacle to travelers on the Oregon Trail route; and floods frequently destroyed the dams and bridges in the area. Not until 1890 was a Big Blue bridge built in Beatrice that could survive for decades.

In 1871, the Burlington and Missouri River Railroad constructed a line from Lincoln, Nebraska to Beatrice. In 1879, the Union Pacific Railroad built a line joining Beatrice to Marysville, Kansas. By 1890, the Chicago, Rock Island and Pacific Railroad had also run tracks through Beatrice.

On August 3, 1892, future president William McKinley, then governor of Ohio, gave a campaign speech in Beatrice.

The former international foods conglomerate Beatrice Foods (now a part of ConAgra Foods) was founded in Beatrice in 1894 as The Beatrice Creamery Company, by George Everett Haskell and William W. Bosworth.

=== Beatrice State Developmental Center ===
In 1885, the Nebraska legislature enacted legislation to establish the Institution for Feeble Minded Youth near Beatrice, subject to the city's donating a suitable parcel of land. Beatrice donated 40 acres, located 2 miles (3 km) east of the city limits, and the first residents were admitted in 1887.

Over the following decades, the institution expanded greatly. By 1935, there were 1171 residents living on 519 acres (210 ha). The institution was largely self-supporting, operating a farm on which the residents did much of the work; in 1935, 346 acres (140 ha) were under cultivation.

In 1945, the institution was renamed the Beatrice State Home. Its resident population peaked at about 2300 in the late 1960s. From there it declined: new restrictions had been imposed on the use of unpaid labor by residents of institutions, and there was a national trend toward deinstitutionalization. In 1975, the Horacek v. Exon lawsuit was settled with a consent decree whereunder many of the residents of the Beatrice State Home were transferred to community-based mental health facilities. In that year, the institution's name was changed to the current Beatrice State Developmental Center.

A 2006 investigation by the federal Centers for Medicare and Medicaid Services revealed a number of severe deficiencies at the Center; after two years of appeals, the Center lost its Medicaid certification in 2009.

As of 2011, the Center served about 175 clients. The majority had been diagnosed with "severe" or "profound" intellectual impairments; nearly all suffered from two or more other disabling conditions.

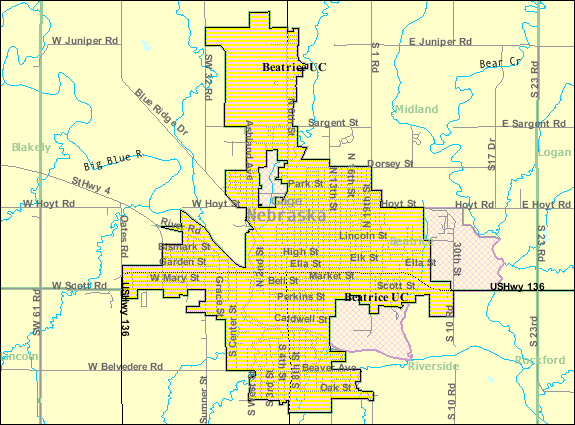
Beatrice and environs

== Geography ==
Beatrice is located at 40°16′6″N 96°44′35″W (40.268449, -96.743192). According to the United States Census Bureau, the city has a total area of 9.11 square miles (23.59 km^{2}), of which 9.02 square miles (23.36 km^{2}) is land and 0.09 square miles (0.23 km^{2}) is water.

=== Climate ===
Climate data for Beatrice, Nebraska (1991-2020)
| Month | Jan | Feb | Mar | Apr | May | Jun | Jul | Aug | Sep | Oct | Nov | Dec | Year |
|---|---|---|---|---|---|---|---|---|---|---|---|---|---|
| Mean daily maximum °F (°C) | 34.9 (1.6) | 40.0 (4.4) | 52.3 (11.3) | 63.3 (17.4) | 73.5 (23.1) | 83.7 (28.7) | 88.4 (31.3) | 86.3 (30.2) | 79.4 (26.3) | 66.6 (19.2) | 51.2 (10.7) | 39.0 (3.9) | 63.2 (17.3) |
| Daily mean °F (°C) | 24.2 (−4.3) | 28.5 (−1.9) | 39.8 (4.3) | 50.5 (10.3) | 61.9 (16.6) | 72.5 (22.5) | 77.0 (25.0) | 74.6 (23.7) | 66.3 (19.1) | 53.5 (11.9) | 39.3 (4.1) | 28.4 (−2.0) | 51.4 (10.8) |
| Mean daily minimum °F (°C) | 13.5 (−10.3) | 16.9 (−8.4) | 27.4 (−2.6) | 37.7 (3.2) | 50.2 (10.1) | 61.3 (16.3) | 65.5 (18.6) | 63.0 (17.2) | 53.3 (11.8) | 40.4 (4.7) | 27.4 (−2.6) | 17.8 (−7.9) | 39.5 (4.2) |
| Average precipitation inches (mm) | 0.69 (18) | 0.90 (23) | 1.73 (44) | 2.88 (73) | 5.05 (128) | 4.60 (117) | 4.06 (103) | 3.77 (96) | 2.99 (76) | 2.33 (59) | 1.32 (34) | 0.98 (25) | 31.3 (796) |
| Average snowfall inches (cm) | 6.4 (16) | 4.9 (12) | 2.2 (5.6) | 0.9 (2.3) | 0.0 (0.0) | 0.0 (0.0) | 0.0 (0.0) | 0.0 (0.0) | 0.0 (0.0) | 0.4 (1.0) | 1.0 (2.5) | 3.0 (7.6) | 18.8 (47) |
| Average extreme snow depth inches (cm) | 5 (13) | 4 (10) | 2 (5.1) | 1 (2.5) | 0 (0) | 0 (0) | 0 (0) | 0 (0) | 0 (0) | 0 (0) | 1 (2.5) | 3 (7.6) | 5 (13) |
| Average precipitation days (≥ 0.01 in) | 4.4 | 4.7 | 6.5 | 9.2 | 11.2 | 9.5 | 9.1 | 8.6 | 7.0 | 6.3 | 4.7 | 4.3 | 85.5 |
| Average snowy days (≥ 0.01 in) | 3 | 2.9 | 1.2 | 0.3 | 0 | 0 | 0 | 0 | 0 | 0.2 | 0.8 | 2.3 | 10.7 |
Source: NOAA

== Demographics ==
Historical population
| Census | Pop. | Note | %± |
|---|---|---|---|
| 1880 | 2,447 | | — |
| 1890 | 13,836 | | 465.4% |
| 1900 | 7,875 | | −43.1% |
| 1910 | 9,356 | | 18.8% |
| 1920 | 9,664 | | 3.3% |
| 1930 | 10,297 | | 6.6% |
| 1940 | 10,883 | | 5.7% |
| 1950 | 11,813 | | 8.5% |
| 1960 | 12,132 | | 2.7% |
| 1970 | 12,389 | | 2.1% |
| 1980 | 12,891 | | 4.1% |
| 1990 | 12,354 | | −4.2% |
| 2000 | 12,496 | | 1.1% |
| 2010 | 12,459 | | −0.3% |
| 2020 | 12,261 | | −1.6% |
U.S. Decennial Census

=== 2020 census ===
As of the 2020 census, Beatrice had a population of 12,261 and 5,431 households. The census also counted 2,907 families, and the population density was 1,293.4 per square mile (499.4/km^{2}).

The median age was 43.6 years. 22.1% of residents were under age 18 and 22.9% were age 65 or older. For every 100 females, there were 94.5 males, and for every 100 females age 18 and over there were 91.2 males.

99.0% of residents lived in urban areas, while 1.0% lived in rural areas.

Of the 5,431 households, 25.2% had children under age 18. 41.4% were married-couple households, 20.5% were households with a male householder and no spouse or partner present, and 30.9% were households with a female householder and no spouse or partner present. 38.1% of households were made up of individuals and 18.8% had someone living alone who was age 65 or older. The average household size was 2.1 and the average family size was 2.8.

There were 6,044 housing units, of which 10.1% were vacant. The homeowner vacancy rate was 3.1% and the rental vacancy rate was 8.8%.

Racial composition as of the 2020 census
| Race | Number | Percent |
|---|---|---|
| White | 11,230 | 91.6% |
| Black or African American | 127 | 1.0% |
| American Indian and Alaska Native | 67 | 0.5% |
| Asian | 89 | 0.7% |
| Native Hawaiian and Other Pacific Islander | 1 | 0.0% |
| Some other race | 146 | 1.2% |
| Two or more races | 601 | 4.9% |
| Hispanic or Latino (of any race) | 496 | 4.0% |

=== Income and poverty ===
The 2016–2020 5-year American Community Survey estimates show that the median household income was $42,103 (with a margin of error of +/- $3,670) and the median family income $59,107 (+/- $6,583). Males had a median income of $34,698 (+/- $3,160) versus $23,972 (+/- $6,964) for females. The median income for those above 16 years old was $30,124 (+/- $2,347). Approximately, 10.8% of families and 19.5% of the population were below the poverty line, including 27.5% of those under the age of 18 and 15.1% of those ages 65 or over.

=== 2010 census ===
As of the census of 2010, there were 12,459 people, 5,509 households, and 3,296 families living in the city. The population density was 1,381.3 inhabitants per square mile (533.3/km^{2}). There were 6,075 housing units at an average density of 673.5 per square mile (260.0/km^{2}). The racial makeup of the city was 96.1% White, 0.5% African American, 0.5% Native American, 0.6% Asian, 0.7% from other races, and 1.6% from two or more races. Hispanic or Latino people of any race were 2.2% of the population.

There were 5,509 households, of which 27.6% had children under the age of 18 living with them, 44.9% were married couples living together, 10.7% had a female householder with no husband present, 4.2% had a male householder with no wife present, and 40.2% were non-families. 34.5% of all households were made up of individuals, and 16.5% had someone living alone who was 65 years of age or older. The average household size was 2.23 and the average family size was 2.82.

The median age in the city was 42.6 years. 22.6% of residents were under the age of 18; 8.2% were between the ages of 18 and 24; 22% were from 25 to 44; 26.8% were from 45 to 64; and 20.4% were 65 years of age or older. The gender makeup of the city was 47.8% male and 52.2% female.

=== 2000 census ===
As of the census of 2000, there were 12,496 people, 5,395 households, and 3,301 families living in the city. The population density was 1,666.7 inhabitants per square mile (643.5/km^{2}). There were 5,818 housing units at an average density of 776.0 per square mile (299.6/km^{2}). The racial makeup of the city was 97.50% White, 0.34% African American, 0.45% Native American, 0.33% Asian, 0.03% Pacific Islander, 0.30% from other races, and 1.05% from two or more races. Hispanic or Latino people of any race were 0.96% of the population.

There were 5,395 households, out of which 28.2% had children under the age of 18 living with them, 49.8% were married couples living together, 8.7% had a female householder with no husband present, and 38.8% were non-families. 33.9% of all households were made up of individuals, and 17.7% had someone living alone who was 65 years of age or older. The average household size was 2.24 and the average family size was 2.87.

In the city, the population was spread out, with 23.4% under the age of 18, 8.4% from 18 to 24, 25.5% from 25 to 44, 21.4% from 45 to 64, and 21.3% who were 65 years of age or older. The median age was 40 years. For every 100 females, there were 89.0 males. For every 100 females age 18 and over, there were 84.7 males.

As of 2000 the median income for a household in the city was $33,735, and the median income for a family was $42,472. Males had a median income of $29,976 versus $21,303 for females. The per capita income for the city was $17,816. About 7.0% of families and 9.5% of the population were below the poverty line, including 10.0% of those under age 18 and 8.9% of those age 65 or over.

== Area attractions ==
- Beatrice Speedway
- Gage County Museum, housed in the 1906 Burlington Railroad Depot and operated by the Gage County Historical Society
- Homestead National Monument of America
- Homestead Trail
- Community Players Theatre

== Notable people ==
- George D. Baker (1868–1933), motion picture director of the silent film era
- The Beatrice Six, a group of people wrongly convicted in 1989 of a 1985 rape and murder, exonerated in 2009
- Eudora Stone Bumstead (1860–1892), poet, hymnwriter
- Cam Jurgens, NFL player for the Baltimore Ravens
- Clara Bewick Colby (1846–1916), author
- Gene L. Coon (1924–1973), screenwriter and television producer
- Jim Faulkner (1899–1962), baseball player
- John P. Fulton (1902–1966), special effects supervisor and cinematographer
- Jim Gillette (b. 1967), glam metal rock musician and lead singer, most notably with Nitro
- Homestead Harmonizers, chorus formed in 1988
- Peter Jansen (1852–1923), sheep rancher, Nebraska state representative and senator
- Weldon Kees (1914–1955), poet, critic, novelist, and short story writer
- Oliver Kirk (1884–1960), won two gold medals in boxing at the 1904 Summer Olympics
- Lou Ann Linehan (b. 1955), member of Nebraska Legislature
- Kevin Meyer (b. 1956), Lieutenant Governor of Alaska
- Ted Muenster, businessman and politician
- Xavier Omon (b. 1985), NFL football player
- Algernon Paddock (1830–1897), U.S. Senator from Nebraska
- Pid Purdy (1904–1951), athlete who played both Major League Baseball and National league football
- Dick Rutherford (1891–1976), NCAA football and basketball coach
- Janet Shaw (1919–2001), film actress
- Robert Taylor (1911–1969), film and television actor
- Edward Wight Washburn (1881–1934), chemist
- Dora V. Wheelock (1847–1923), temperance activist and writer

== In popular culture ==
Beatrice is the setting for The Gallows, a 2015 found footage movie that was co-written, co-directed and co-produced by Chris Lofing, a graduate of Beatrice High School.

A popular story was circulated about a near-miss that occurred in Beatrice, when, at 7:25 pm on March 1, 1950, the West End Baptist Church was destroyed by a natural gas explosion five minutes after a scheduled choir practice was to start, but no one was injured because all fifteen members were late, and thus not present at the time of the explosion. Snopes.com identified this as a true event. It was covered in an episode of Unsolved Mysteries.

In June 2022, HBO Max released Mind Over Murder, a documentary series about the Beatrice Six, a group of acquaintances who were falsely convicted of a 1985 rape and murder that occurred in Beatrice.

The 1970 science fiction novel The House in November by Keith Laumer is primarily set in Beatrice, Nebraska.

== See also ==
- National Register of Historic Places listings in Gage County, Nebraska
