= Robert L. Richards =

American screenwriter

- Born: March 1, 1909; New York City, New York, USA
- Died: June 1984 (aged 75); Mexico
- Occupation: Screenwriter
- Years active: 1940-1968
- Spouses: Silvia Richards nee Goodenough (m. 1938; sep. 1944) Pamela Maria Bower nee Wilcox (m. 1947; dev. 1948) Ann Morgan nee Roth (m. 1949)

Robert L. Richards (March 1, 1909 - June 1984) was a film screenwriter. He attended Horace Mann School (high school) and graduated from Harvard in 1932. He worked for Time magazine and the March of Time radio program and newsreel for 7 years.

Richards worked on a number of notable films of the 1940s and 1950s including Winchester '73, Johnny Stool Pigeon, and Act of Violence. His radio work included writing for the Suspense series which aired on the CBS network from 1942 until 1962. Among Richards' numerous Suspense offerings was his critically acclaimed neogothic horror thriller entitled "The House in Cypress Canyon" broadcast on December 5, 1946. Considered one of the tautest, most chilling dramas in the Suspense canon, the now classic show featured Robert Taylor, Cathy Lewis, Hans Conried, and Howard Duff in starring roles.

Richards testified before the House Unamerican Activities Committee on September 20, 1951. He was asked about his membership in the Communist Party, and took the Fifth Amendment. His testimony was followed by that of Ann Roth Morgan Richards, his wife, who said she and Robert were married in 1949. She also took the Fifth Amendment.

According to Paul Buhle and Dave Wagner in their 2002 film history, Radical Hollywood, Richards was "named and abandoned" by his screenwriter ex-wife Sylvia Richards, and he "cheerfully told HUAC questioners that," while "he devoted his final pre-blacklist years to writing screenplays about stool pigeons," he refused to be one. They also report that "according to old friends," he thereafter "made a miserable living by brewing moonshine whiskey, but drank much of it himself."

== Filmography ==
=== Films ===
Year	Film	Credit	Notes
1940	The Ramparts We Watch	Screenplay By	Co-Wrote Screenplay with "Cedric R. Worth"
1946	The Last Crooked Mile	Story By	Based on a radio play
1948	One Sunday Afternoon	Screenplay By	Based on the 1933 play of the same name by James Hagan
1949	Act of Violence	Screenplay By	
1949	Johnny Stool Pigeon	Screenplay By	
1950	Winchester '73	Screenplay By	Co-Wrote Screenplay with "Borden Chase"
1950	Kansas Raiders	Story By, Screenplay By	
1951	Air Cadet	Story By, Screenplay By	Co-Wrote Story with "Robert Soderberg"
1955	The Indian Fighter	Story By	
1961	Gorgo	Story By, Screenplay By	Co-Wrote Story and Screenplay With "Daniel James"
1969	Kenner	Screenplay By	Co-Wrote Screenplay with "Harold Clemins"

=== Television ===
Year	TV Series	Credit	Notes
1952	The Unexpected	Writer	2 Episodes
1953	Boston Blackie	Writer	1 Episode
1954	Fireside Theatre	Writer	1 Episode
