= Air Cadet (film) =

1951 film by Joseph Pevney

- Film poster by Reynold Brown
- Directed by: Joseph Pevney
- Written by: Joseph Hoffman (additional dialogue)
- Screenplay by: Robert L. Richards
- Story by: Robert L. Richards; Robert Soderberg
- Produced by: Aaron Rosenberg
- Starring: Stephen McNally; Gail Russell; Alex Nicol; Richard Long
- Cinematography: Clifford Stine
- Edited by: Russell F. Schoengarth
- Production company: Universal International Pictures
- Distributed by: Universal Pictures
- Release dates: March 14, 1951 (San Antonio, Texas)
- Running time: 94 minutes
- Country: United States
- Language: English

Air Cadet is a 1951 American drama war film directed by Joseph Pevney and starring Stephen McNally, Gail Russell, Alex Nicol and Richard Long. Air Cadet featured United States Air Force (USAF) pilots in training along with actors mixed into the training courses. (Note: In a screen credit, a written foreword reads: "This picture was photographed on the actual locations which appear upon the screen. Except for the principal players, all Air Force personnel are shown as themselves, in the actual roles and duties they perform in real life. To the officers, cadets and airmen of the United States Air Force, Air Training Command, this picture is gratefully and respectfully dedicated.") The film had a small early role for 26-year-old Rock Hudson and a scene with future astronaut Gus Grissom.

== Plot ==
Walt Carver, Russ Coulter, Jerry Connell and former U.S. Army Sgt. Joe Czanoczek join a group of cadets beginning Air Force pilot training. Each of the cadets has his own reason for serving in the Air Force: Carver is attempting to overcome his privileged background, Coulter wants to emulate his brother who had died in World War II, Connell is trading on his prior background as a civilian pilot and Sgt. Czanoczek wants to make his wartime military experience count.

Besides flying, the trainees have to contend with upperclassmen who are intent on hazing the newcomers. After primary training at Randolph Field on AT-6 Texan aircraft, the group loses Connell, who opts to become a navigator. All of the others successfully solo and await their next assignment.

The rest of the group of trainees, including Czanoczek, who wanted to fly B-25 Mitchell medium bombers, progress to advanced training on jet aircraft at Williams Air Force Base. Coulter meets and falls in love with Janet Page, the estranged wife of one of the instructors, major Jack Page, the leader of an F-80 Shooting Star jet aerobatics team. The rivalry with Page puts Coulter's future as a fighter pilot in jeopardy. Janet realizes that Coulter has aggravated some of Page's former demons. He had been tormented by the guilt of sending men to their deaths in wartime. After being branded a coward by Page, Coulter's brother had committed suicide, a secret that had been gnawing at him.

The pressure to solo erodes Coulter's confidence, and after an accident on his solo flight, he has to confront Page during the accident investigation. Coulter is cleared and allowed to continue training, but the rivals are pitted against each other in the air when Page takes command of Coulter's training. Page selects Coulter, Carver and Czanoczek as his wingmen in a new "Acrojets" flying team, but he is sure that his rival will not be up to the task. (Note: During the production of the Air Cadet, the Acrojets flew many of the flying sequences led by base commander Col. Leon W. Gray with Lt. Michael Smolen, the team leader, serving as the technical advisor for the film.)

In a check flight, the major and Coulter fly together in a two-seat trainer to see whether the young cadet will remain on the team. When his oxygen supply fails, Page loses consciousness and Coulter must execute a risky desert landing. Finally able to deal with his guilt, Page realizes that Coulter is not to blame. Janet finally reconciles with her husband, who is asked by his former rival to pin on his aviator wings, signifying Coulter's graduation as a fighter pilot.

== Cast ==
- Stephen McNally as Major Jack Page
- Gail Russell as Janet Page
- Alex Nicol as Joe Czanoczek
- Richard Long as Russ Coulter
- Charles Drake as Captain Sullivan
- Robert Arthur as Walt Carver
- Rock Hudson as Upper Classman
- Peggie Castle as Pat
- James Best as Jerry Connell
- Parley Baer as Major Jim Evans

== Production ==
Production of Air Cadet began at Randolph Air Force Base near San Antonio, Texas on October 4, 1950. The scenes at Randolph were filmed in five days and the cast and crew transferred to Williams Air Force Base near Mesa, Arizona where the majority of the film was shot, with filming ending in mid-December 1950. Some sequences were shot at Tyndall Air Force Base and in Panama City, Florida. Before he became widely known as an astronaut, Gus Grissom was an extra who is briefly seen early in the film as a U.S. Air Force candidate for the Randolph flight school.

The aerial sequences were filmed from a B-25 bomber that had been converted into a camera platform. Because of the film's high-contrast sky backgrounds, when the sky was clear or blue, photography was not possible. Much of the flying was "done at an altitude at which G-forces were in effect, making everything, including the 60-pound camera and the photographers' own bodies, feel seven times heavier."

== Reception ==
The West Coast premiere of Air Cadet was held at the Fox West Coast Theater in Los Angeles, where a jet engine and cutaway aircraft were featured in a lobby display.

In a contemporary review for The New York Times, critic A. H. Weiler wrote: "Let it be said that the course of training is stimulating only when the silvery jets are keening through the wild, blue yonder or dazzling the eye in tight formation, barrel rolls or "lazy eights." Once on the ground, however, the boys' problems tend to make one airsick."

In his book Aviation in the Cinema, aviation film historian Stephen Pendo assessed Air Cadet as routine fare and noted: "The aerial shots are the only bright lights in the whole film, and the best of these are the aerobatic sequences in which the men fly in a four-ship diamond formation with their wingtips 18 inches apart." In From the Wright Brothers to Top Gun: Aviation, Nationalism, and Popular Cinema, Michael Paris reviewed Air Cadet, writing: "The feature offered little that was new, and, indeed, owed a considerable debt to the earlier I Wanted Wings (1941)."
