= Rancho Notorious =

1952 Western film directed by Fritz Lang

- Theatrical release poster
- Directed by: Fritz Lang
- Screenplay by: Daniel Taradash
- Story by: Silvia Richards
- Produced by: Howard Welsch
- Starring: Marlene Dietrich; Arthur Kennedy; Mel Ferrer
- Cinematography: Hal Mohr
- Edited by: Otto Ludwig
- Music by: Emil Newman
- Color process: Technicolor
- Production company: Fidelity Pictures Corporation
- Distributed by: RKO Radio Pictures
- Release date: March 6, 1952 (US)
- Running time: 89 minutes
- Country: United States
- Language: English

Rancho Notorious is a 1952 American Technicolor Western film, directed by Fritz Lang and starring Marlene Dietrich as the matron of a criminal hideout called Chuck-a-Luck, named after the game of chance referenced in the film. Arthur Kennedy and Mel Ferrer play rivals for her attention in this tale of frontier revenge.

The independent film was originally titled Chuck-a-Luck, with "The Legend of Chuck-a-Luck" as the title song, but the name was changed at the insistence of Howard Hughes, then head of RKO Pictures.

== Plot ==
A recurring ballad introduces this tale of "hate, murder, and revenge." Wyoming ranch hand Vern Haskell is enraged when his fiancée Beth Forbes is raped and murdered during a store robbery. He sets out after the two thieves, first with a posse, then by himself. He finds one of them, Whitey, shot in the back by his partner after a quarrel. When Vern asks where his partner was headed, his dying words are "Chuck-a-Luck."

Vern continues his search, questioning everyone he meets about the phrase. He finally finds someone who mentions that a woman named Altar Keane is connected with Chuck-a-Luck. When the man realizes that Vern is just fishing for information, Vern is forced to kill him in self-defense. Vern is taken into custody and then released when the dead man is identified as a wanted outlaw. By a stroke of luck, a deputy knows Altar as a saloon singer from his past, though not her current whereabouts.

Vern learns that after Altar quit working for saloon owner Baldy Gunder, she bet her last $20 on his rigged game of chance, a wheel of fortune variant of chuck-a-luck. With the help of gunslinger Frenchy Fairmont, she won a great deal of money. Vern learns that Frenchy has just been arrested and is in custody in a town called Gunsight, and to gain access to him, Vern has himself arrested there.

After they break out, Frenchy takes Vern to his home, the Chuck-a-Luck, a horse ranch near the Mexican border owned by Altar. The ranch is a no-questions-asked hideout available to any outlaw willing to pay. Kinch, the killer of Vern's fiancee, is among the outlaws residing there, but Vern doesn't know his face. Kinch notices Vern's suspiciousness of the outlaws.

Vern catches Altar's eye. One night, she wears the brooch that his fiancee was wearing when she died. He starts to romance Altar to find out who gave it to her, making Frenchy jealous.

Vern goes along on a bank robbery with the outlaws of the Chuck-a-Luck. After finally recognizing Vern, Kinch secretly shoots at him but misses. Vern returns to the Chuck-a-Luck to bring Altar her cut. She has fallen for his feigned advances, and when he questions her about the brooch, she reveals Kinch as the source. In a fury, Vern tells her his true purpose and expresses his disdain for her profession. Vern tries to turn Kinch over to a sheriff, but the latter escapes with the help of the other outlaws. Back at the ranch, Altar packs her bags and plans to leave her profession behind. The outlaws return to the ranch to try to kill Altar for outing Kinch. A gunfight breaks out, with Frenchy and Vern on one side, and the remaining outlaws on the other. Altar is shot protecting Frenchy, who has shot Kinch dead. The outlaws flee, while Frenchy and Vern ride off together.

== Cast ==
- Marlene Dietrich as Altar Keane
- Arthur Kennedy as Vern Haskell
- Mel Ferrer as Frenchy Fairmont
- Gloria Henry as Beth Forbes
- William Frawley as Baldy Gunder
- Lisa Ferraday as Maxine
- John Raven as Chuck-a-Luck dealer
- Jack Elam as Mort Geary
- George Reeves as Wilson
- Frank Ferguson as Preacher
- Francis McDonald as Harbin
- Dan Seymour as Comanche Paul
- John Kellogg as Factor
- Rodric Redwing as Rio
- Russell Johnson as Croupier
- Emory Parnell as Sheriff who arrests Vern

== Reception ==
=== Critical response ===
When Rancho Notorious was released, Bosley Crowther of The New York Times was critical of the film: "In the department of western action, the show has its interesting points, including a couple of fist-and-gun fights that have been racily staged by Fritz Lang. Anyone who will settle for stick-ups and slug fests and pistol duels, all in Technicolor, may find enough in this picture to satiate his lust. Hungry-looking actors swagger and snarl in the outlaw roles. But anyone who expects a Western picture to match the character of its able female star had better look in another direction. This one is run-of-the-mill."

The staff at Variety magazine gave the film and Marlene Dietrich a much more positive review: "This Marlene Dietrich western has some of the flavor of the old outdoor classics (like the actress's own onetime Destry Rides Again) without fully capturing their quality and magic. The characters play the corny plot [original story by Silvia Richards] straight; directing keeps the pace lively and interesting, and the outdoor shots, abetted by the constant splash of color, are eye-arresting. Dietrich is as sultry and alluring as ever ... Dietrich is a dazzling recreation of the old time saloon mistress, and handles her song, 'Get Away, Young Man,' with her usual throaty skill."
