= Shanghai Madness =

1933 film

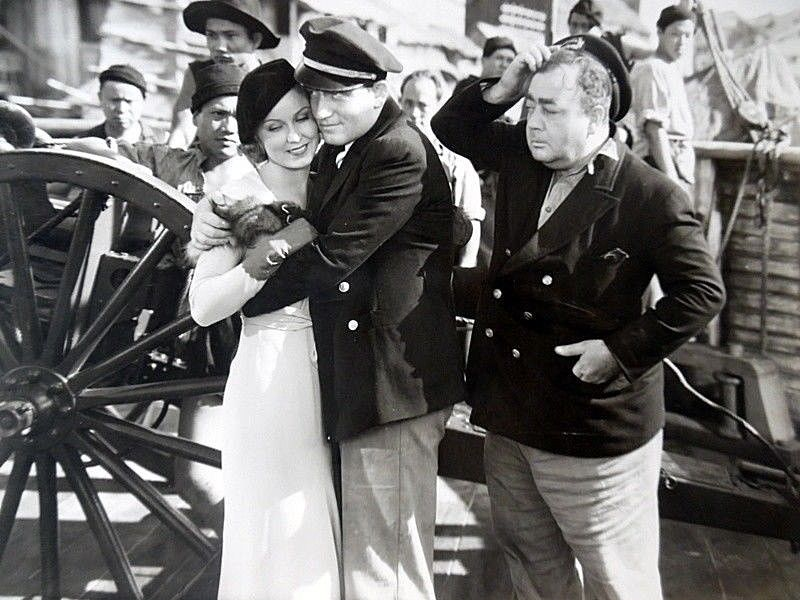
- Publicity still
- Directed by: John G. Blystone
- Written by: Frederick Hazlitt Brennan; Edward T. Lowe Jr. Austin Parker; Gordon Wellesley
- Produced by: William Fox; Al Rockett
- Starring: Spencer Tracy; Fay Wray; Ralph Morgan
- Cinematography: Lee Garmes
- Edited by: Margaret Clancey; Alex Troffey
- Music by: Louis De Francesco
- Production company: Fox Film Corporation
- Distributed by: Fox Film Corporation
- Release date: August 4, 1933
- Running time: 68 minutes
- Country: United States
- Language: English

Shanghai Madness is a 1933 American Pre-Code drama film directed by John G. Blystone and starring Spencer Tracy, Fay Wray, Ralph Morgan, and Albert Conti. It was released by Fox Film Corporation.

== Plot ==
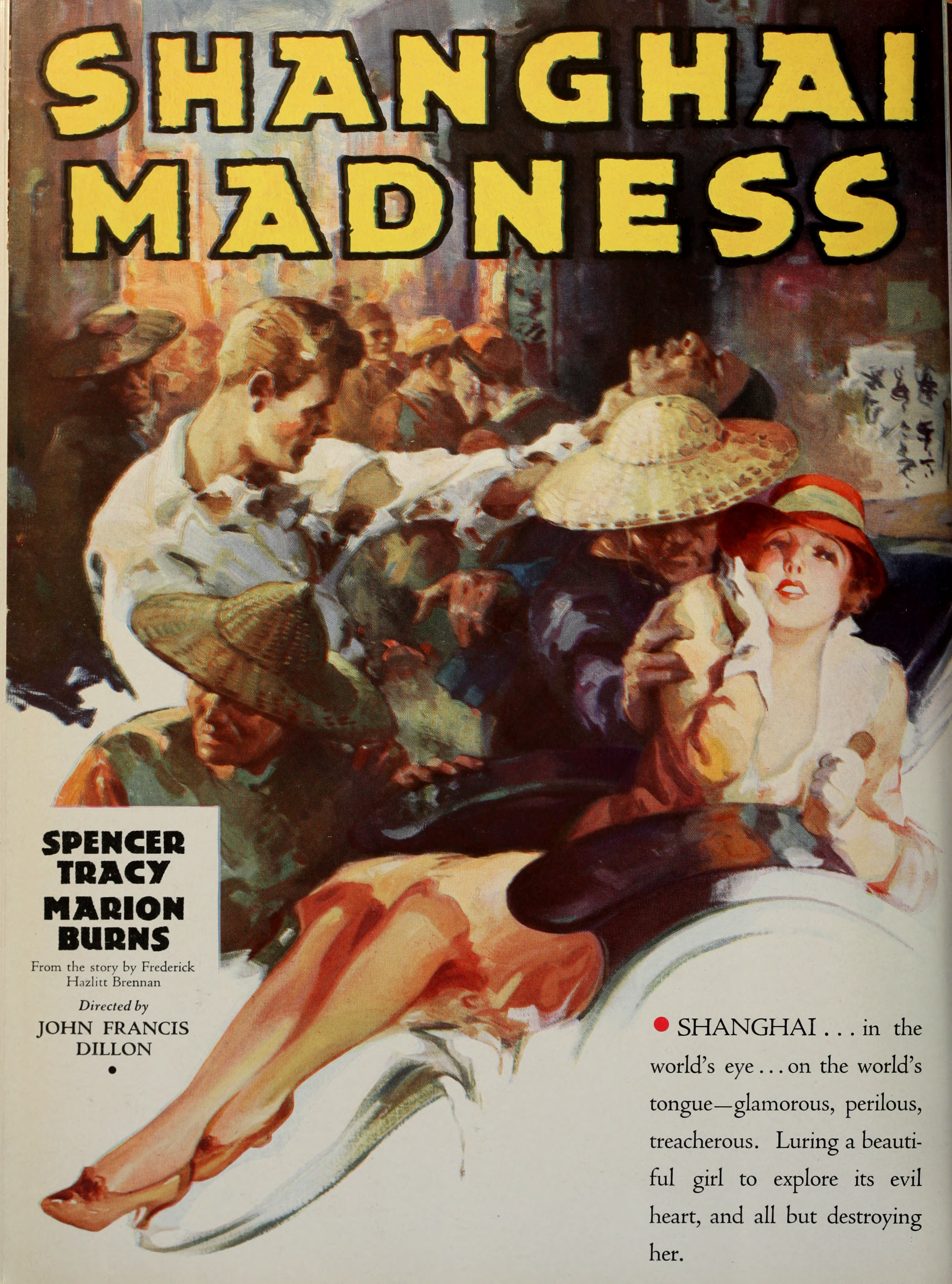
Studio advertisement for an earlier project starring Marion Burns in place of Fay Wray

After attacking and destroying a Chinese outpost, an American officer is dismissed from the US Navy and instead finds himself in charge of a gunboat and tries to prevent a mission being overrun by Communist insurgents.

== Production ==
An early advertisement for the film touts a different director and a different leading lady.

== Cast ==
- Spencer Tracy as Pat Jackson
- Fay Wray as Wildeth Christie
- Ralph Morgan as Li Po Chang
- Eugene Pallette as Lobo Lonergass
- Herbert Mundin as Larsen
- Arthur Hoyt as Van Emery
- Albert Conti as Rigand
- Maude Eburne as Mrs. Glissen
