= Louis De Francesco =

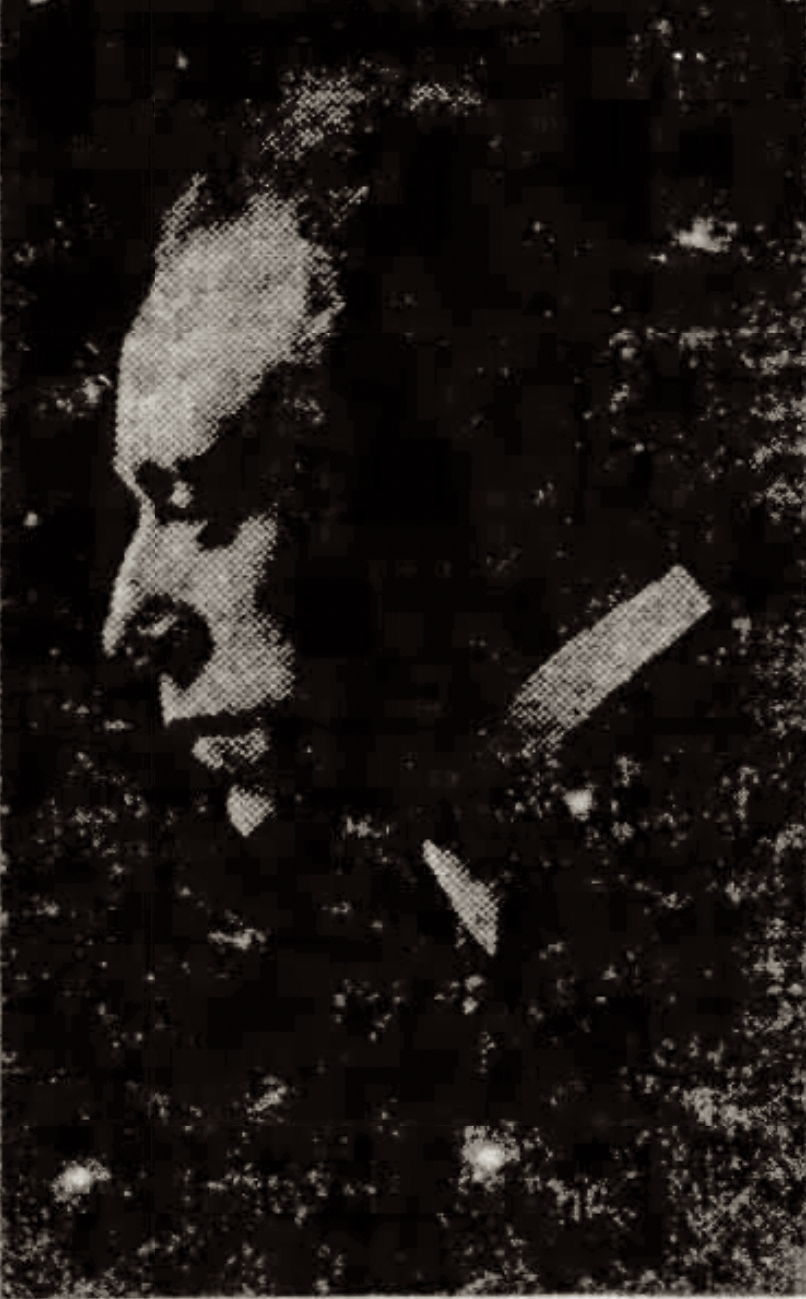
Louis De Francesco

Louis De Francesco, born Luigi Ettore De Francesco, (December 26, 1886 (Note: Reference works on De Francesco give his birth year as 1888. However, primary documents do not match this year. His birth year is given as 1886 in the U.S., Passport Applications, 1795-1925, the U.S., World War I Draft Registration Cards, 1917-1918, the California, U.S., Death Index, 1940-1997, and the U.S., Social Security Death Index, 1935-2014.) - October 5, 1974) was an Italian-born American composer and conductor.

== Life and career ==
The son of Vincent De Francesco, Louis Ettore De Francesco was born in Atessa, Italy on December 26, 1886. He was educated at the Naples Conservatory where he studied with Giuseppe Martucci and Camillo de Nardis. He immigrated to the United States in 1910 where he initially was employed as a conductor of light operas with various touring companies. In 1913 he was music director for a touring production of The Firefly starring Edith Thayer. For more than three years he worked as a conductor with the De Koven Opera Company; leading performances of Robin Hood on tour from 1915 to 1917. He also worked as a conductor for an opera company organized by Oscar Hammerstein I and for the Aborn Opera Company.

In September 1917 De Francesco became a naturalized American citizen. In the 1920s he was active as a conductor of live orchestras which accompanied silent films. By 1927 he was music director of the Famous Players Road Show with The Musical Courier describing him as "one of the most capable directors of motion picture music in the country."

In 1928 music publisher Samuel Fox (SF) hired De Francesco to work as film score composer John Stepan Zamecnik's assistant in the Sound Synchronization department of his company which contracted with film companies like Paramount Pictures. De Francesco's first score for SF was the The Wedding March (1928) which he co-wrote with Zamecnik. He collaborated with Zamecnik on many subsequent film scores; including Redskin (1929), Betrayal (1929), Cavalcade (1933), Dangerously Yours (1933), Zoo in Budapest (1933), The Warrior's Husband (1933), The Devil's in Love (1933), Shanghai Madness (1933), and The Power and the Glory (1933) among others.

In late 1932 De Francesco was appointed supervisor over the music department at Fox Movietone. From 1932 to 1935 he composed the scores to 25 films made by Fox. Some of these included Chandu the Magician (1932), State Fair (1933), The Warrior's Husband (1933), I Loved You Wednesday (1933), All Men Are Enemies (1934), Carolina (1934), Such Women Are Dangerous (1934), Grand Canary (1934), The Gay Deception (1935), and Here's to Romance (1935). He later wrote the score to the 1940 patriotic film The Ramparts We Watch, and the scores to more than 100 short films.

De Francesco died in Northridge, Los Angeles on October 5, 1974.

== Notes and references ==
=== Bibliography ===
- American Society of Composers, Authors and Publishers (1980). "De Francesco, Louis". ASCAP Biographical Dictionary, Fourth Edition. R.R. Bowker Co.; Jaques Cattell Press.
- McCarty, Clifford (1972). Film Composers in America: A Checklist of Their Work. Da Capo Press.
- McCarty, Clifford (2000). Film Composers in America: A Filmography, 1911-1970. Oxford University Press. ISBN 9780195114737.
- Rehrig, William H. (1991). "De Francesco, Louis". In Bierley, Paul E. (ed.). The Heritage Encyclopedia of Band Music: Composers and Their Music. Vol. 1. Integrity Press.
- Ussher, Bruno David, ed. (1933). "De Francesco, Louis". Who's Who in Music and Dance in Southern California. Bureau of Musical Research.
