= The House in Cypress Canyon =

- Suspense episode
- Episode no.: Episode 222
- Directed by: William Spier
- Written by: Robert L. Richards
- Original air date: December 5, 1946

Guest appearances
- Robert Taylor: James A. Woods; Cathy Lewis: Ellen Woods; Hans Conried: Jerry; Howard Duff: Sam; Paul Frees; Jim Backus; Wally Maher

"The House in Cypress Canyon" is an episode of the American radio series Suspense. Written by Robert L. Richards, produced and directed by William Spier, this episode is consistently cited as one of the most terrifying programs broadcast during radio's Golden Age. It originally aired December 5, 1946 on CBS radio.

== Plot summary ==
The plot is presented as a "story within a story", framed by a meeting between detective Sam (played by Howard Duff) and a friend who has discovered a manuscript regarding the titular house. After a brief introduction, the narrative shifts to the story presented in the manuscript.

The story begins a few days before Christmas. James (Robert Taylor) and Ellen (Cathy Lewis), married seven years and having recently relocated to California for the husband's engineering job, move into a hastily finished rental house in a development that was started before the war. Dusty furniture and creaky hinges seem to be the only problems with the place at first glance. But the very night they move in, the two hear inhuman cries in the night, and find blood oozing out from under a closet door they can't open. Fleeing the house in a panic, they return with a pair of policemen, only to discover the closet door is unlocked and the blood has vanished. The following night, Ellen, sleep-walking, attacks James like a crazed animal and bites him savagely, waking with no memory of the attack; then the milkman is discovered with his throat torn out. The narrative concludes with James' indication that he has accepted his fate and is no longer afraid; he knows now what he must do. Just then there's a knock on the door and the inhuman scream is heard again. A newspaper article clipped to the manuscript notes that James killed Ellen with a shotgun before turning the weapon on himself.

The episode then returns to the framing story, with Sam discussing the case with his friend. The friend explains the paradox that the manuscript was found in the same house in which the story appears to have taken place, but that at the time the manuscript was found, the house was derelict and unfinished. Impossibly, the story set down in the manuscript appears to have taken place in the house after the manuscript was discovered. Sam suggests that this is just a coincidence and leaves.

After Sam leaves, his friend returns to his regular occupation as a rental agent for the housing development. As the story concludes, a young couple comes into his office and asks about renting the house in Cypress Canyon. The couple is James and Ellen.

== Broadcast history ==
Despite being such a well-regarded episode, "The House in Cypress Canyon" was only performed once on Suspense.
