= Elijah Filley Stone Barn =

- U.S. National Register of Historic Places
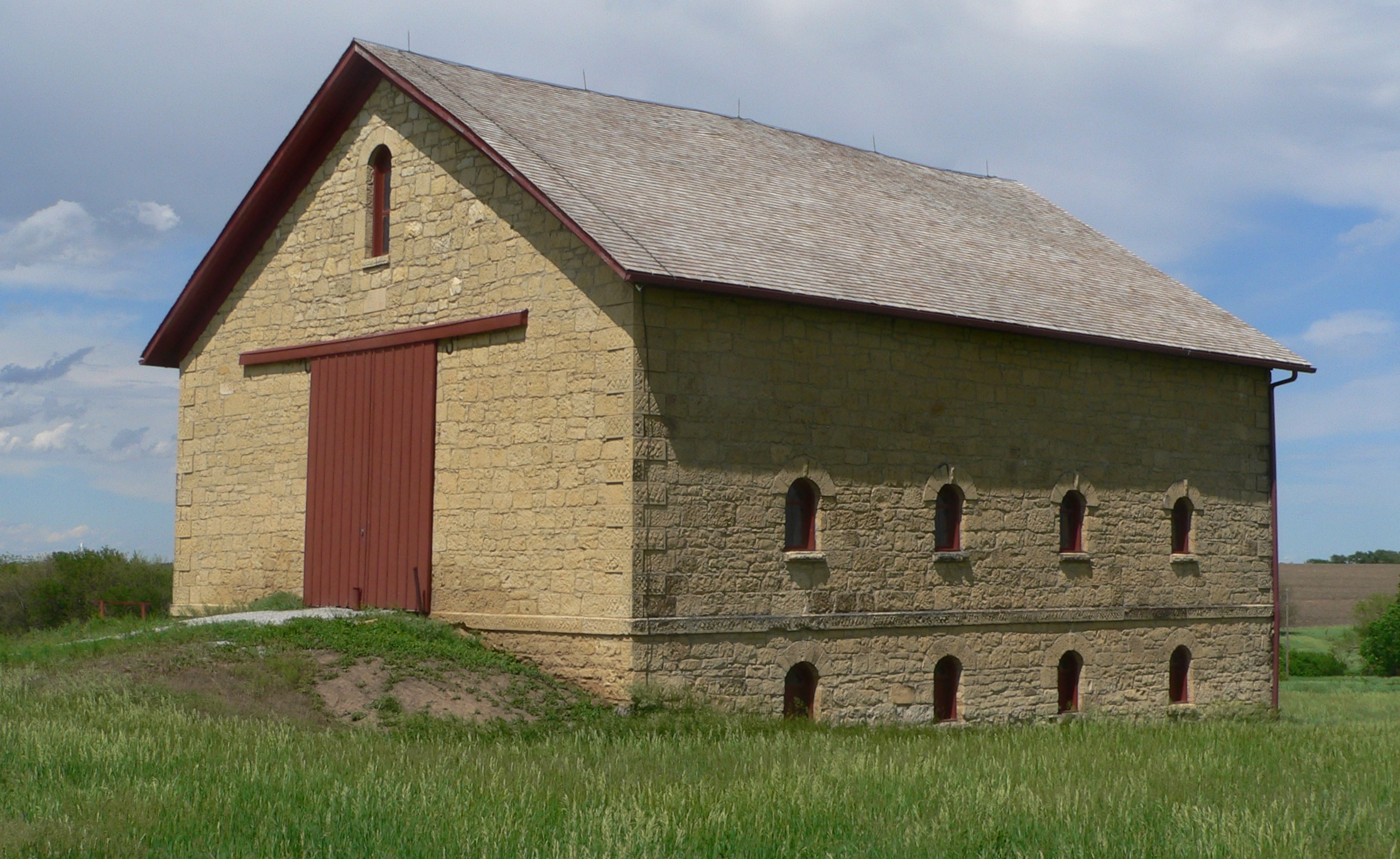
- The barn in 2013

- Location within Nebraska Location within the United States
- Nearest city: Filley, Nebraska
- Coordinates: 40°15′47″N 96°32′25″W
- Area: less than one acre
- Built: 1874
- NRHP reference No.: 77000830
- Added to NRHP: April 11, 1977

The Elijah Filley Stone Barn is a historic barn in Filley, Nebraska. It was built in 1874 with limestone quarried by Ammi Filley for his son, Elijah, and his daughter-in-law, Emily. Elijah Filley became an accomplished farmer, and he served as a member of the Nebraska House of Representatives from 1880 to 1881, and as a member of the Nebraska Senate from 1882 to 1883. The barn has been listed on the National Register of Historic Places since April 11, 1977.
