= Ruby Gentry =

1952 film directed by King Vidor

- Directed by: King Vidor
- Written by: Arthur Fitz-Richard; Silvia Richards
- Produced by: Joseph Bernhard; King Vidor
- Starring: Jennifer Jones; Charlton Heston; Karl Malden
- Narrated by: Barney Phillips
- Cinematography: Russell Harlan
- Edited by: Terrell O. Morse
- Music by: Heinz Roemheld
- Production company: Bernhard-Vidor Productions Inc.
- Distributed by: Twentieth Century-Fox
- Release date: December 19, 1952 (Salt Lake City)
- Running time: 82 minutes
- Country: United States
- Language: English
- Budget: $525,000 (estimated)
- Box office: $1.75 million

Ruby Gentry is a 1952 American southern Gothic film noir directed by King Vidor, and starring Jennifer Jones, Charlton Heston, and Karl Malden. Set in the backwoods of North Carolina, the film follows a poor woman who marries a man for his wealth, leading to tragic events.

Twentieth Century-Fox premiered Ruby Gentry in Salt Lake City on December 19, 1952, with releases expanding to numerous cities through 1953. The film grossed $1.75 million at the United States box office.

In 1960, the film and its title character served the inspiration for Roberta Lee Streeter to sing under the name Bobbie Gentry.

== Plot ==
Ruby Corey, a poor backwoods girl living in the small North Carolina town of Braddock, is still in love with Boake Tackman. During high school, Ruby had rebuffed his aggressive advances, and was taken in for a couple of years by a kind wealthy businessman and his wife, who protected her and taught her the skills a lady would need. She moved back home when her father needed her help. Boake's family used to be wealthy, but after generations of profligacy all he has left is the land he drained and farmed. He starts a relationship with her but plans to marry a local woman with a rich family. When she hears the news, Ruby marries her widowed, former benefactor, Mr. Jim Gentry, despite not loving him.

Her background keeps her from being accepted by most of Jim's peers, most of whom decline to attend their after-wedding party. While at another party, Jim gets into a fistfight with Boake after witnessing him dancing with Ruby. Jim calls Ruby a tramp who looks like a lady but doesn't behave like one. She leaves in tears, and later that night, he apologizes. The next day Jim and Ruby go sailing, where he tells her he "doesn't mind being second best" and she admits she really does love him. A loose rope results in Jim being knocked overboard by the boom, leaving Ruby widowed and distraught.

The local paper reports that foul play cannot be ruled out, in other words that she may have murdered Jim for his fortune, and mentions the fistfight between Jim and Boake. Jim's friends renounce her and she receives accusatory phone calls and harassment from the townspeople. Ruby uses Jim's money to begin a campaign against everyone who slighted her, calling in debts to close down people's businesses as well as the newspaper that slandered her. Her brother comes to beg her for leniency, but she throws him out, warning she is just getting started. When Boake visits, she gives him the promissory-note he had signed and which was acquired by Gentry, and offers to run off with him, but he rejects her, saying that for all her money she can't buy her way out of the swamp, and she can't buy him.

Ruby has Boake's land flooded, ruining the crops. After seeing her fury, he goes back to her. Boake and Ruby go to her father's annual duck-hunting party where she goes back to her country roots and Boake drinks away his resentment before visiting her room late at night.

While hunting the next day, Boake turns on Ruby in retaliation for her actions but she apologizes. Just then, her estranged brother Jewel Corey begins to shoot at the couple while quoting Bible verses about the wickedness of women and sinners who must be struck down. They try to hide in the swamp but Jewel shoots Boake in the abdomen, killing him; Ruby goes after Jewel and guns him down. Cradling Boake in her arms, Ruby laments her decisions.

Ruby later becomes the skipper of a fishing boat, forever looked down upon by the townspeople.

== Cast ==
- Jennifer Jones as Ruby Corey Gentry
- Charlton Heston as Boake Tackman
- Karl Malden as Jim Gentry
- Tom Tully as Jud Corey
- Barney Phillips as Dr. Saul Manfred / Narrator
- James Anderson as Jewel Corey
- Josephine Hutchinson as Letitia Gentry
- Phyllis Avery as Tracy McAuliffe
- Herbert Heyes as Judge Tackman
- Myra Marsh as Ma Corey
- Charles Cane as Cullen McAuliffe
- Sam Flint as Neil Fallgren
- Frank Wilcox as Clyde Pratt

== Production ==
=== Development ===
King Vidor, who was hired as director, had previously directed actress Jennifer Jones in Duel in the Sun (1946), produced by Jones's husband, David O. Selznick. Vidor had directed Bird of Paradise (1932), also produced by Selznick, decades earlier. During the filming of Duel in the Sun, tensions rose between Vidor and Selznick near the production's completion due to what Vidor felt was "near-constant intervention" from Selznick. However, as Selznick was not a credited producer on Ruby Gentry, Vidor agreed to direct, as he had enjoyed working with Jones.

=== Casting ===
Commenting on Jones's performance style, Vidor stated: "When I first saw Jennifer, I was impressed by the fact that her emotional reactions registered so clearly on her face. It is difficult to exactly define this quality... Whatever gentleness and patience [a] director expanded on Jennifer, he was rewarded a hundred-fold with a sensitive and intriguing performance."

=== Filming ===
Though some establishing shots were completed in North Carolina, Ruby Gentry was mostly filmed in California in Paso Robles, San Luis Obispo, San Marino, Morro Bay, Pismo Beach, and director King Vidor's private ranch in Willow Creek.

Unlike his previous film starring Jones, Duel in the Sun, Vidor reflected on the filming of Ruby Gentry favorably, feeling he had significant creative freedom during the production.

== Theme song ==
The film's theme song, "Ruby", was composed by Heinz Eric Roemheld. At the time of the film's release, the theme enjoyed much popularity in orchestral recordings by Les Baxter, with harmonica solo by Danny Welton., Victor Young And His Singing Strings with George Fields on harmonica (Columbia DO-70040, Australia), Richard Hayman And His Orchestra with Richard Hayman on harmonica, and Jerry Murad and the Harmonicats. It has subsequently become a jazz and pop standard, both as an instrumental and with lyrics by Mitchell Parish, recorded by such artists as Ray Charles and Neil Diamond, Les Welch & His Orchestra, with vocals by Richard Gray (Festival-Manhattan FM75, a shellac 78 in Australia), and Vic Damone, on his 1962 Capitol album The Lively Ones (Capitol T1748).

== Release ==
Ruby Gentry had its world premiere Salt Lake City on December 19, 1952. It opened in Lancaster, Pennsylvania on Christmas Eve 1952, and on Christmas Day in Boston and New York City. It premiered on December 31, 1952 in several U.S. cities, including Portland, Oregon, and Springfield, Massachusetts.

Owners of the Fox Theatre in Detroit ran advertisements for the film in the Detroit Free Press highlighting the film's adult themes and urging the public to not allow children to see the film.

The film was theatrically reissued in late 1960.

=== Home media ===
MGM Home Entertainment released Ruby Gentry on DVD on October 19, 2004, after acquiring the rights to the film through their licensing deal with ABC. Kino Lorber reissued the film on DVD and Blu-ray on April 17, 2018.

== Reception ==
=== Box office ===
Ruby Gentry grossed $1.75 million in the United States.

=== Critical response ===
Dorothy Masters of the New York Daily News felt Jones was miscast in the lead role, deeming her performance "disastrous," but awarded the film a three out of five-star rating. W. Ward Marsh of The Plain Dealer described the film as "repellant" and found its characters and screenplay distasteful, but conceded, "I have no fault to find with anybody's acting."

Dale Freeman, writing for the Springfield Leader and Press, uniformly praised the lead performances of Jones, Heston, and Malden, while describing the film as "earthy and realistic—and hard-hitting."

On the review aggregator website Rotten Tomatoes, 63% of 8 critics' reviews are positive.

In 2022, Richard Brody of The New Yorker praised the film as a "volatile blend of sex, death, money, revenge, class prejudice, religious fanaticism, and the burden of history," praising it as "one of the most scathing, furious films of classic-era Hollywood."

== Legacy ==
Singer-songwriter Bobbie Gentry based her stage name on the film and its title character.

In February 2020, the film was shown at the 70th Berlin International Film Festival, as part of a retrospective dedicated to King Vidor's career. It later screened at Lincoln Center in 2022.

== Sources ==
- Stoehr, Kevin L.; Gallagher, Cullen (2024). King Vidor in Focus: On the Filmmaker's Artistry and Vision. Jefferson, North Carolina: McFarland & Company. ISBN 978-1-476-67009-6.
- Weisbard, Eric (2007). Listen Again: A Momentary History of Pop Music. Durham, North Carolina: Duke University Press. ISBN 978-0-822-34041-6.
