= Filley, Nebraska =

- Village
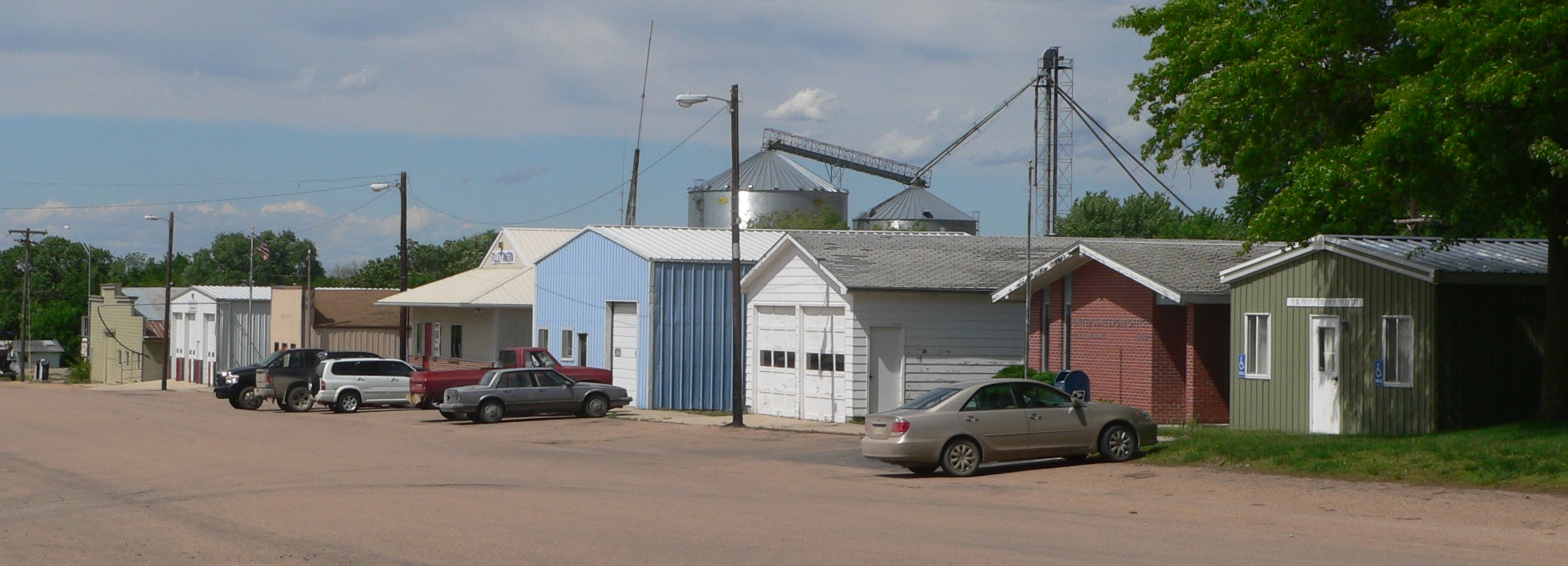
- Downtown Filley: Livingston Street

- Location of Filley, Nebraska

- Location within Nebraska Location within the United States
- Coordinates: 40°17′07″N 96°32′02″W
- Country: United States
- State: Nebraska
- County: Gage
- Township: Filley

Area
  - Total: 0.11 sq mi (0.28 km^{2})
  - Land: 0.11 sq mi (0.28 km^{2})
  - Water: 0 sq mi (0.00 km^{2})
- Elevation: 1,404 ft (428 m)

Population (2020)
  - Total: 124
  - Density: 1,134.0/sq mi (437.85/km^{2})
- Time zone: UTC-6 (Central (CST))
  - Summer (DST): UTC-5 (CDT)
- ZIP code: 68357
- Area code: 402
- FIPS code: 31-16830
- GNIS feature ID: 2398876

Filley is a village in Gage County, Nebraska, United States. The population was 124 at the 2020 census.

== History ==
Filley was platted in 1883 when the railroad was extended to that point. It was named for its founder, Elijah Filley.

The Elijah Filley Stone Barn in Filley is listed on the National Register of Historic Places. It is maintained by the local historical society, and open to the public.

== Geography ==
According to the United States Census Bureau, the village has a total area of 0.11 square miles (0.28 km^{2}), all land.

== Demographics ==
Historical population
| Census | Pop. | Note | %± |
|---|---|---|---|
| 1890 | 301 | | — |
| 1900 | 248 | | −17.6% |
| 1910 | 194 | | −21.8% |
| 1920 | 169 | | −12.9% |
| 1930 | 183 | | 8.3% |
| 1940 | 174 | | −4.9% |
| 1950 | 136 | | −21.8% |
| 1960 | 149 | | 9.6% |
| 1970 | 138 | | −7.4% |
| 1980 | 172 | | 24.6% |
| 1990 | 157 | | −8.7% |
| 2000 | 174 | | 10.8% |
| 2010 | 132 | | −24.1% |
| 2020 | 124 | | −6.1% |
U.S. Decennial Census

=== 2010 census ===
As of the census of 2010, there were 132 people, 61 households, and 39 families living in the village. The population density was 1,200.0 inhabitants per square mile (463.3/km^{2}). There were 65 housing units at an average density of 590.9 per square mile (228.1/km^{2}). The racial makeup of the village was 99.2% White and 0.8% Native American.

There were 61 households, of which 24.6% had children under the age of 18 living with them, 55.7% were married couples living together, 3.3% had a female householder with no husband present, 4.9% had a male householder with no wife present, and 36.1% were non-families. 29.5% of all households were made up of individuals, and 16.4% had someone living alone who was 65 years of age or older. The average household size was 2.16 and the average family size was 2.72.

The median age in the village was 47.5 years. 20.5% of residents were under the age of 18; 6% were between the ages of 18 and 24; 20.5% were from 25 to 44; 25.8% were from 45 to 64; and 27.3% were 65 years of age or older. The gender makeup of the village was 53.0% male and 47.0% female.

=== 2000 census ===
As of the census of 2000, there were 174 people, 73 households, and 48 families living in the village. The population density was 1,546.4 inhabitants per square mile (597.1/km^{2}). There were 77 housing units at an average density of 684.3 per square mile (264.2/km^{2}). The racial makeup of the village was 100.00% White. Hispanic or Latino of any race were 2.30% of the population.

There were 73 households, out of which 28.8% had children under the age of 18 living with them, 64.4% were married couples living together, 2.7% had a female householder with no husband present, and 32.9% were non-families. 31.5% of all households were made up of individuals, and 17.8% had someone living alone who was 65 years of age or older. The average household size was 2.38 and the average family size was 3.02.

In the village, the population was spread out, with 25.3% under the age of 18, 5.2% from 18 to 24, 24.7% from 25 to 44, 24.1% from 45 to 64, and 20.7% who were 65 years of age or older. The median age was 42 years. For every 100 females, there were 93.3 males. For every 100 females age 18 and over, there were 97.0 males.

As of 2000 the median income for a household in the village was $32,500, and the median income for a family was $48,250. Males had a median income of $26,250 versus $22,250 for females. The per capita income for the village was $19,112. None of the population or families were below the poverty line.

== Notable person ==
- Robert Taylor, actor
