= The Warrior's Husband =

1933 film by Lesley Selander, Walter Lang

- Directed by: Walter Lang
- Screenplay by: Walter Lang; Sonya Levien; Ralph Spence
- Based on: The Warrior's Husband by Julian Thompson
- Produced by: Jesse L. Lasky
- Starring: Elissa Landi; David Manners; Ernest Truex
- Cinematography: Hal Mohr
- Edited by: Paul Weatherwax
- Music by: Louis De Francesco
- Production company: Fox Film Corporation
- Distributed by: Fox Film Corporation
- Release date: April 28, 1933
- Running time: 75 minutes
- Country: United States
- Language: English

The Warrior's Husband is a 1933 American pre-Code comedy film directed by Walter Lang and starring Elissa Landi, David Manners, and Ernest Truex. It tells the story of the Amazons, who ruled over men thanks to the sacred girdle of Diana, and Hercules who came to steal it. The film is based on a 1932 Broadway production of Julian Thompson's 1924 play that starred Katharine Hepburn in the lead role.

== Plot ==
In Pontus, the land of the Amazons, the gender roles and natures are completely reversed. Women are the strong sex, thanks to the sacred girdle of the goddess Diana (Roman names are used). It is in the care of queen Hippolyta and her sister Antiope, the commander of the female armed forces. The men stay at home and take care of the children. Only Sapiens, the new husband of queen Hippolyta, advocates men's rights.

Just like the relationships are reversed, so too are the Greeks for the Amazons a legendary race that probably doesn't exist, instead of the other way around. This is about to change when two Greeks come to court to announce that Hercules needs to get the girdle of Diana to complete his twelve labours. In reality, Hercules may not be much of a threat, but his friend Theseus certainly is. Meanwhile, Sapiens, using his male wiles, is secretly trying to wreck the Amazon's defense from within. Eventually he manages to capture Hercules, and let him escape with the girdle. Without it, the Amazons lose the battle and the gender dynamic shifts to roles matching the social mores of the 1930s.

== Main cast ==
- Elissa Landi as Antiope
- David Manners as Theseus
- Ernest Truex as Sapiens
- Marjorie Rambeau as Hippolyta
- Tiny Sandford as Hercules
- Helen Ware as Pomposia
- Lionel Belmore as Homer
- Maude Eburne as Buria

== Production of Broadway play ==
The Broadway play of the year before is considered one of the breakthrough roles of Katharine Hepburn. It was a revival of a 1924 play by Julian F. Thompson (the play reappeared in 1942 as a musical adaptation By Jupiter). The film version was made with an entirely different cast and music.

== Preservation status ==
The film has not been issued on home video or shown on television, although George Eastman House and the Museum of Modern Art have copies.

== See also ==
- List of films featuring Hercules
