= Act of Violence =

1948 film by Fred Zinnemann

- Theatrical release poster
- Directed by: Fred Zinnemann
- Screenplay by: Robert L. Richards
- Story by: Collier Young
- Produced by: William H. Wright
- Starring: Van Heflin; Robert Ryan; Janet Leigh
- Cinematography: Robert Surtees
- Edited by: Conrad A. Nervig
- Music by: Bronislau Kaper
- Production company: Metro-Goldwyn-Mayer
- Distributed by: Loew's Inc.
- Release date: January 22, 1949 (New York City)
- Running time: 82 minutes
- Country: United States
- Language: English
- Budget: $1,290,000
- Box office: $1,129,000

Act of Violence is a 1949 American film noir directed by Fred Zinnemann and starring Van Heflin, Robert Ryan, Janet Leigh, Mary Astor and Phyllis Thaxter. It was produced by Hollywood studio Metro-Goldwyn-Mayer. Adapted for the screen by Robert L. Richards from a story by Collier Young, the film confronts the ethics of war and was one of the first to address the problems of World War II veterans.

== Plot ==
Frank Enley is regarded as a respected figure in the small California town of Santa Lisa. He lives there with his wife, Edith, and their child, having relocated from the East. While Frank is out fishing, an old acquantance of his, Joe Parkson, who has a crippled leg, comes to his house and asks Edith where he can find him. When he comes home, Frank tells Edith that Joe served under his command during World War II and irrationally blames him for everything that went wrong during and after the war.

Frank goes away to a trade convention at a Los Angeles hotel. Joe again confronts Edith and claims that he is the sole survivor of Frank's collusion with the Nazis while they were both prisoners of war in a German POW camp. Edith goes to Los Angeles to warn Frank. He confesses that Joe was telling the truth and he informed the Nazis of an escape attempt in exchange for food. Joe's girlfriend, Ann Sturgess, knows about his vendetta, but cannot dissuade him from it.

Joe finds Frank and they scuffle. The inebriated Frank runs through downtown Los Angeles and ends up in a dive bar. A woman, Pat, introduces him to a shady lawyer, Gavery, and a thug for hire, Johnny. A drunken Frank gives Johnny the information he needs to lure Joe into an ambush at the Santa Lisa train station, but regrets what he said as he sobers up.

Frank goes home and tells Edith that Joe has calmed down and left town. Frank then goes to the station to warn Joe. Johnny is waiting in a car with a gun, but as he fires, Frank jumps in front of Joe and takes the bullet. With his last reserve of energy, Frank causes Johnny's car to crash into a lamppost, killing the hitman before Frank also collapses. Joe volunteers to tell Frank's wife about his death.

== Cast ==
- Van Heflin as Frank R. Enley
- Robert Ryan as Joe Parkson
- Janet Leigh as Edith Enley
- Mary Astor as Pat
- Phyllis Thaxter as Ann Sturgess
- Berry Kroeger as Johnny
- Taylor Holmes as Gavery
- Harry Antrim as Fred Finney
- Connie Gilchrist as Martha Finney
- Will Wright as Pop

== Production ==
Act of Violence was adapted from an unpublished story by Collier Young, before he embarked on a career as an independent producer with his future wife Ida Lupino. The film was intended to be a low-budget independent film, with Howard Duff attached to star. Mark Hellinger soon acquired the script, with the intention to pair Gregory Peck with Humphrey Bogart in the leading roles. Hellinger died in 1947, and it was then sold to MGM. Robert Ryan was lent to MGM by RKO Pictures for the production. Act of Violence was the third film made by Ryan in 1948, following Berlin Express and Return of the Badmen. Principal photography took place from May 17 to mid-July 1948, with added scenes shot in late August 1948. Location shooting included scenes at Big Bear Lake and the San Bernardino National Forest, California, accompanied by filming at the MGM Studios in Culver City. Some of the nighttime city scenes were shot in the slum neighborhoods of Los Angeles.

The film was one of the first completed under the personal stamp of MGM's new head of production Dore Schary, who had been hired to be "the new Thalberg" by the company's New York board in response to plummeting profits due to the competition of television and the loss of its theater chain to the Hollywood Anti-trust Case of 1948.

Peter Hay, in his 1991 history of the studio, MGM: When the Lion Roars, noted how Schary's new policy as studio boss in 1948 was to encourage realism and "pursue stories for their own sake rather than as vehicles for stars." That Act of Violence was "highly praised by critics" vindicated this policy and led to other "descriptively titled" MGM thrillers like Scene of the Crime, Tension, Shadow on the Wall and The Asphalt Jungle.

In his autobiography, director Fred Zinnemann stated that Act of Violence was the first film in which he felt confidence in all the aspects of the production.

In her autobiography, Janet Leigh called the film "my most demanding role to date" and "a giant step forward in my development as an actress." She characterized Zinnemann's direction as "extraordinary, sensitive, incredible. I was fortunate to be in the company of these talents and I knew it, and I worked like a demon to prove worthy. It was hard; there was not one easy scene.The tension began in the beginning and kept mounting to a crescendo, and I constantly had to overcome the liability of actually being too young for the part. But it was heady stuff, exhilarating, stimulating."

In their 2002 film history, Radical Hollywood, Paul Buhle and Dave Wagner note that "Act of Violence was written by future blacklistee Robert Richards, who cheerfully told HUAC questioners that he devoted his final pre-blacklist years to writing screenplays about stool pigeons."

== Reception ==
According to MGM records, Act of Violence earned $703,000 in the US and Canada and $426,000 overseas, resulting in a loss of $637,000.

=== Critical response ===
Bosley Crowther, reviewing the film for The New York Times, emphasized that it was a director's "tour de force. For this latter asset of the picture, we have Mr. Zinnemann to thank. He has pictured, at least, a visual setting for terror and violence and he has kept the pursued and the pursuer going at a grueling pace. In the former role, Van Heflin strains and sweats impressively. As his relentless pursuer, Robert Ryan is infernally taut. Mr. Zinnemann has also extracted a tortured performance from Janet Leigh as the fearful, confused and disillusioned wife of the hunted man and he has got squalid portraits of scoundrels from Mary Astor, Berry Kroeger and Taylor Holmes."

Variety gave Act of Violence a positive review, writing "The grim melodrama implied by its title is fully displayed in Act of Violence...tellingly produced and played to develop tight excitement...The playing and direction catch plot aims and the characterizations are all topflight thesping. Heflin and Ryan deliver punchy performances that give substance to the menacing terror...It's grim business, unrelieved by lightness, and the players belt over their assignments under Zinnemann's knowing direction. Janet Leigh points up her role as Heflin's worried but courageous wife, while Phyllis Thaxter does well by a smaller part as Ryan's girl. A standout is the brassy, blowzy femme created by Mary Astor—a woman of the streets who gives Heflin shelter during his wild flight from fate."

Film reviewer Roger Westcombe, writing for the Big House Film Society, considers Act of Violence unsettling, and wrote "Act of Violence...with a profundity, through its unsettling moral continuum, redolent not of Hollywood simplicities of good/evil but of the art one associates with Zinnemann's European background. This contains a clue. Fred and his brother escaped their native Austria in 1938, but their parents, waiting for U.S. visas that never came, perished—separately—in concentration camps. The 'survivor guilt' this awful closing engendered must resemble the emotional see-saw ride which fiction like the ethical pendulum of Act of Violence can only start to expiate." Eddie Muller of the Film Noir Foundation pointed out that it "bristles with anger and guilt, the first postwar noir to take a challenging look at the ethics of men in combat."

Blake Lucas, writing about Act of Violence in Film Noir: An Encyclopedic Reference to the American Style, praises the work of cinematographer Robert Surtees, "who contributes atmospheric night-for-night exteriors and evocatively lit interiors that are worthy of the best film noir."

Critic Leonard Maltin gave the film three stars (out of four), calling it "a stark, well-acted drama... with a fine vignette by Astor as a sympathetic call girl."

Discussing Zinnemann's career in his New Biographical Dictionary of Film, critic David Thomson named Act of Violence "the best film he ever made."

Foster Hirsch's Film Noir: The Dark Side of the Screen devotes half a page to an MGM display ad for the film to show how it "stresses the recurrent noir theme of sudden, annihilating misfortune." (With the text under Janet Leigh's alarmed face: "One Morning Frank Kissed Me Goodbye... And everything was as it had always been. That evening, he came home with horror in his eyes... and told me things that changed my life forever.")

Currently, it holds a 94% "Fresh" rating on Rotten Tomatoes, based on 17 reviews.

== Awards and honors ==
Fred Zinnemann was nominated for the Grand Prize of the Festival at the 1949 Cannes Film Festival for his work on Act of Violence.
