= Possessed (1947 film) =

1947 film by Curtis Bernhardt

- Theatrical release poster
- Directed by: Curtis Bernhardt
- Screenplay by: Silvia Richards; Ranald MacDougall
- Based on: One Man's Secret; 1943 novellette in Cosmopolitan by Rita Weiman
- Produced by: Jerry Wald
- Starring: Joan Crawford; Van Heflin; Raymond Massey; Geraldine Brooks
- Cinematography: Joseph Valentine
- Edited by: Rudi Fehr
- Music by: Franz Waxman
- Production company: Warner Bros. Pictures
- Distributed by: Warner Bros. Pictures
- Release date: July 26, 1947 (United States)
- Running time: 108 minutes
- Country: United States
- Language: English
- Budget: $2,592,000
- Box office: $3,072,000

Possessed is a 1947 American psychological drama directed by Curtis Bernhardt, starring Joan Crawford, Van Heflin, and Raymond Massey in a tale about an unstable woman's obsession with her ex-lover. The screenplay by Ranald MacDougall and Silvia Richards was based upon a story by Rita Weiman.

== Plot ==
A woman wanders through Los Angeles, saying little more than "David". Admitted to a hospital's psychiatric ward in a catatonic stupor, and interrogated by a doctor, she calls herself Louise Howell, and recounts her life in intermittent spurts, starting with her memory of her lover, David Sutton, playing Schumann for her, with she saying, "I want to have a monopoly on you." He does not return her passion, but returns her home in a boat, and tells her their relationship is over.

She lives and works as a nurse at the lakeside home of the Grahams. Louise takes care of Pauline, the invalid wife of Dean Graham. Pauline is irascible and venomous and thinks Louise is having an affair with her husband; Louise wants to leave.

Later, the police trawl the lake and find Pauline's body. Dean says she killed herself. The Graham children Wynn, (a young boy) and Carol (a college-age young woman), return home. A coroner's hearing is held, with a verdict of accidental death. Afterwards, Louise encounters Carol, who angrily says Pauline's letters said Louise was attractive to Dean. Carol wants Louise to leave; Dean, who has arrived, demands Carol apologize and slaps her.

David comes by and says Dean's oil business needs him as an engineer; he is hired. Louise speaks to him and thinks he has another woman, which he denies. Louise goes with the Grahams to Washington, DC, taking care of Wynn. David happens to be there, and Louise starts drinking and looks strained; he says he is out of love with her forever, and she slaps him. She says she will quit her job, but Dean asks her to marry him; she agrees, though she says she is not in love with him, which he accepts.

Louise visits Carol at college, wanting to be liked by her; a reconciliation occurs. At the wedding, the uninvited David arrives late and speaks to the crying Carol, who says she asked him for marriage at 11 years of age, which he remembers. Louise warns him away from Carol and tells him to leave.

Later, Carol invites him over to their box at a piano recital; Louise has a distressed recollection of David at the piano and leaves. At home, she has a lengthy hallucination; Carol returns with David, who kisses Carol. Louise confesses to killing Pauline. Carol says she'll tell Dean; Louise hits her, and she rolls down the stairs and dies. After the hallucination ends Carol then comes home for real, but not with David.

Louise, feeling disturbed, visits a doctor under a false name, and is recommended to go to a psychiatrist, but walks out. She asks Dean for a divorce; Dean asks why, and Louise says Pauline hates her. On a vacation back at the lake house, Louise climbs to Pauline's bedroom, screams, and when Dean runs up there, Louise says Pauline is in the room, saying to her, "Kill yourself, Louise". Dean says she's dead, and turns on the light; Louise doesn't see her any more, but confesses to helping her kill herself. Dean says that was false, as Louise was in the village on her day off.

Back at their regular home, Louise, happy to be free of Pauline's ghost, wants to go dancing, but Dean and she see David and Carol at the nightclub. Louise later lies to Carol that David really wants her, Louise. David drops by and confronts Louise, who says Carol said she, Carol, is tired of David. Louise then admits lying, and that she is willing to do anything to keep David; he threatens to tell Dean about Louise and their past.

Dean confronts Louise and says a doctor will come see her; she gets angry that he is a mental specialist, though she agrees to talk to him. She sneaks away to David and says she is worried about being institutionalized. David says he will call Dean, and that he is going away that night to marry Carol. Louise gets out a gun; he taunts her, and she shoots him repeatedly.

She awakens at the hospital and admits killing David. Dean visits, and the doctor says it is psychosis, as if she is possessed of devils, but he can restore her. He also says her tortured mind and delusion that she helped Pauline kill herself, made her present condition almost inevitable, and that if he had seen her sooner, her problems could have been averted. About the upcoming trial of David's death, the doctor says Louise is not responsible for any of her actions. They go see the sleeping Louise, and the doctor says the healing process will be long and difficult, and she will suffer a great deal before recovery. Dean pledges to help support his wife recover fully, no matter what.

== Cast ==
- Joan Crawford as Louise Howell
- Van Heflin as David Sutton
- Raymond Massey as Dean Graham
- Geraldine Brooks as Carol Graham
- Stanley Ridges as Dr. Willard
- John Ridgely as Chief Investigator
- Moroni Olsen as Dr. Ames
- Erskine Sanford as Dr. Sherman
- Peter Miles as Wynn Graham
- Jakob Gimpel as Pianist
- Isabel Withers as Nurse Rosen
- Lisa Golm as Elsie
- Douglas Kennedy as Asst. District Attorney
- Monte Blue as Norris
- Don McGuire as Dr. Craig
- Rory Mallinson as Coroner's Assistant
- Clifton Young as Interne
- Griff Barnett as Coroner
- Nana Bryant as Pauline Graham

== Production ==
Crawford spent time visiting mental wards and talking to psychiatrists to prepare for her role, and said the part was the most difficult she ever played.

During production, director Curtis Bernhardt accidentally kept referring to Crawford as "Bette", as he had just finished filming A Stolen Life with Bette Davis.

Crawford tried unsuccessfully to convince Warner Bros. Pictures to change the film's title to The Secret, since she had already starred in a film of the same title (Possessed with Clark Gable as her leading man) 16 years earlier.

The musical score, by Franz Waxman, makes extensive use of a piano piece by Robert Schumann, the "Chopin" movement from Carnaval Op. 9. The Schumann piece is played on the piano by David near the beginning of the movie and is used throughout the score to underscore Louise's obsession with David.

== Release ==
The film was entered into the 1947 Cannes Film Festival.

== Reception ==
=== Box office ===
According to Warner Bros. accounts, Possessed earned $1,987,000 domestically and $1,085,000 globally for a worldwide total of $3,027,000.

=== Critical reception ===
Herman Schoenfeld of Variety positively wrote that Joan Crawford "cops all thesping honors in this production with a virtuoso performance as a frustrated woman ridden into madness by a guilt-obsessed mind. Actress has a self-assurance that permits her to completely dominate the screen even vis-a-vis such accomplished players as Van Heflin and Raymond Massey." Overall, he felt that "Despite its overall superiority, Possessed is somewhat marred by an ambiguous approach in Curtis Bernhardt's direction. Film vacillates between being a cold clinical analysis of a mental crackup and a highly surcharged melodramatic vehicle for Crawford's histrionics."

James Agee in Time wrote, "Most of it is filmed with unusual imaginativeness and force. The film is uncommonly well acted. Miss Crawford is generally excellent", while Howard Barnes in the New York Herald Tribune argued, "[Crawford] has obviously studied the aspects of insanity to recreate a rather terrifying portrait of a woman possessed by devils."

More recently, film critic Dennis Schwartz gave the film a mixed review, writing,

"In German émigré director Curtis Bernhardt's melodrama Possessed, Joan Crawford plays a mentally disturbed person who can't distinguish reality from her imagination. Through use of German expressionism techniques and many familiar film noir shadowy shots, the b/w film takes on a penetrating psychological tone and makes a case for a not guilty of murder plea due to insanity. Though Joan has a powerful presence in this movie, she played her mad role in a too cold and campy way to be thought of as a sympathetic figure. All the psychological treatment therapy sounded like psycho-babble and Joan's acting was overstuffed, though some of her morbid imaginations were gripping and held my attention. Too heavy with German stimmung it still is fun to watch the melodramatics play out in this tale of overbearing love, painful rejection, paranoia and murder."

Film historian Bob Porfirio notes,

"By developing the plot from the point-of-view of a neurotic and skillfully using flashback and fantasy scenes in a straightforward manner, the distinction between reality and Louise's imagination is blurred. That makes Possessed a prime example of oneirism, the dreamlike tone that is a seminal characteristic of film noir."

=== Accolades ===
At the 20th Academy Awards, Joan Crawford was nominated for Academy Award for Best Actress, losing to Loretta Young in The Farmer's Daughter.
