= The Indian Fighter =

1955 film by André de Toth

- Theatrical release poster
- Directed by: Andre de Toth
- Screenplay by: Frank Davis and Ben Hecht
- Based on: Original story by Robert L. Richards
- Produced by: William Schorr
- Starring: Kirk Douglas; Walter Matthau; Diana Douglas; Walter Abel; Lon Chaney; Eduard Franz; Alan Hale; Elsa Martinelli
- Cinematography: Wilfrid M. Cline, A.S.C.
- Edited by: Richard Cahoon, A.C.E.
- Music by: Franz Waxman songs by Irving Gordon
- Production company: Bryna Productions
- Distributed by: United Artists
- Release date: December 21, 1955 (New York)
- Running time: 88 minutes
- Country: United States
- Language: English
- Box office: $2,450,000 (US)

The Indian Fighter is a 1955 American CinemaScope and Technicolor Western film directed by Andre de Toth and based on an original story by Robert L. Richards. The film is the first of star Kirk Douglas's Bryna Productions that was released through United Artists. The film co-stars Elsa Martinelli, Walter Matthau, Kirk Douglas's ex-wife Diana Douglas and Walter Abel.

== Plot ==
Johnny Hawks is a man who made his name fighting Indians. Returning to the West after the Civil War, he must now stop wronged Sioux warriors from attacking the Oregon-bound wagon train and nearby fort that he is leading. Tensions between the two communities are building, with Indians trading gold to the whites for whiskey, and the white men trying to find the source of the Indians' "yellow iron".

Todd and Chivington, two unscrupulous white men engaged in trading whiskey for gold, shoot and kill a member of Chief Red Cloud's Lakota tribe when he refuses to tell them where the gold is. Chivington escapes, but Todd is captured. Hawks, visiting Red Cloud, fights Red Cloud's brother Gray Wolf for Todd's life and defeats him. He takes the ambitious gold-hunter back to the local fort commanded by Captain Trask, inviting the Chief to come to the fort to sign a peace treaty to see that justice is done for his dead tribesman.

After the treaty is signed, Hawks leads the wagon train west (including Todd and Chivington, whom Trask wants out of the area before they can make more trouble), taking it out of the way so he can see Red Cloud's daughter Onahti, with whom he is in love. Some of the tribesmen come to the train to trade game and handicrafts for manufactured goods. Chivington and Todd get a brave of weak character drunk enough to tell them where the gold comes from, despite the "oath of death" that Red Cloud required of every adult in the tribe not to reveal the location. Gray Wolf comes across the drunken party, realizes what has happened, and is stabbed to death by Todd, although he lives long enough to give a war cry, setting off a war between the white settlers, the U.S. Cavalry at the fort, and Red Cloud's band.

When Johnny Hawks, en route to the train, is attacked by Red Cloud's braves, he realizes what has happened. The wagon train hurries back to the fort, losing a few wagons along the way. The emigrants tell Captain Trask their version of what happened. When Hawks arrives on an Indian pony after having his own horse killed, the emigrants try to lynch him, stopped by Trask firing a volley over their heads.

Besieged in the fort by a superior force, the soldiers, the pioneers and Hawks defend a day-long attack by Sioux warriors making good use of fire arrows and fireballs catapulted over the curtain wall by flexible stripped saplings. In the evening, after the Indians cease hostilities for the night, Hawks asks Captain Trask for permission to go over the wall, make his way to Red Cloud's camp, and attempt to restore the peace by turning over Gray Wolf's killers to him. Trask refuses permission, but Hawks goes anyway, amidst a rain of bullets from the fort.

Arriving at the camp, Hawks seeks Onahti and persuades her to take him to the source of the Sioux gold. There, he finds Todd and Chivington preparing to blast the vein of exposed gold, and takes them into custody. Todd's attempt to escape results in Chivington's death, and Onahti knocks Todd unconscious when he tries to bolt past her. Onahti and Hawks take Todd back to Red Cloud so that justice might be done. When Todd runs for his life, he is shot and killed.

Hawks and Red Cloud discuss the war that the chief is considering, one that Johnny warns Red Cloud will end with the extermination all Indians. The telling argument comes when Hawks asks the wise chieftain on which side his and Onahti's son would fight. Onahti confirms her love for Johnny, and her father sees the wisdom of not fighting. The next day, the tribe rides to within sight of the fort, but turns away without attacking. The war has been avoided.

The surviving pioneer wagons roll along the river that runs past Red Cloud's encampment. Johnny Hawks and Onahti, skinny-dipping in the river, watch them pass on their way to the new lands in Oregon.

== Cast ==
- Kirk Douglas as Johnny Hawks
- Elsa Martinelli as Onahti
- Walter Matthau as Wes Todd
- Diana Douglas as Susan Rogers
- Walter Abel as Captain Trask
- Lon Chaney as Chivington
- Eduard Franz as Red Cloud
- Alan Hale as Will Crabtree
- Elisha Cook as Briggs
- Ray Teal as Morgan
- Frank Cady as Trader Joe
- Michael Winkelman as Tommy Rogers
- William Phipps as Lt. Blake
- Harry Landers as Grey Wolf
- Hank Worden as Crazy Bear

Uncredited

- Lane Chandler as head settler
- Buzz Henry as Lt. Shaeffer

== Production ==
The film was shot in Bend, Oregon. The end credits state, "Filmed in Oregon with the cooperation of the Bend Chamber of Commerce and the U.S. National Forestry Service."

== Comic book adaptation ==
- Dell Four Color #687 (March 1956)
