= The Ramparts We Watch =

1940 film directed by Louis de Rochemont

- Theatrical release poster
- Directed by: Louis de Rochemont
- Screenplay by: Robert L. Richards; Cedric R. Worth
- Produced by: Louis de Rochemont; Thomas Orchard (associate)
- Cinematography: Charles E. Gilson; John A. Geisel
- Edited by: Lothar Wolff
- Music by: Louis De Francesco
- Production company: The March of Time
- Distributed by: RKO Radio Pictures
- Release date: August 16, 1940
- Running time: 87 minutes
- Country: United States
- Language: English

The Ramparts We Watch is a 1940 American drama film, the first of four full-length features produced by The March of Time, which was much more well known for the series of newsreels they produced from 1935 to 1951. The picture was produced and directed by Louis de Rochemont, from a screenplay by Robert L. Richards and Cedric R. Worth, and was distributed by RKO Radio Pictures, who released it on August 16, 1940.

The film used no professional actors, instead relying on residents of the town where most of the filming took place: New London, Connecticut. It also used footage from a Nazi propaganda film, Feuerteufe (Baptism of Fire).
