= Silvia Richards =

American screenwriter

- Born: Silvia Hope Goodenough; May 11, 1915; Indianola, Iowa, U.S.
- Died: December 21, 1999 (aged 84); Woodland Hills, California, U.S.
- Occupation: Screenwriter
- Spouse: A.I. Bezzerides

Silvia Richards (born Silvia Hope Goodenough) was an American screenwriter who worked on a number of films in the 1940s and 1950s, including the film noir Ruby Gentry and the Western Rancho Notorious. She also wrote for television in the 1950s and early 1960s.

== Origins ==
Richards was born in Indianola, Iowa, to Aubrey Goodenough and Gertrude Pearl. She attended high school in Colorado Springs, Colorado. She married Robert L. Richards in 1938 in Alexandra, Virginia. The two lived in New York for a time, where their son David was born; they'd eventually move to Hollywood to launch careers as screenwriters.

== HUAC hearings ==
Richards' work was interrupted by the McCarthy Hearings. She was called in as a friendly witness for HUAC but claimed that she went along with HUAC because she feared for the well-being of her two young sons. Her action helped cause a divorce from her husband, screenwriter Robert L. Richards, who would not testify for the committee. Robert Richards was blacklisted and forced to write under various pseudonyms for the remainder of his career.

== Later life ==
Following her divorce from Richards, Silvia married screenwriter A. I. (Buzz) Bezzerides, another victim of the McCarthy-era blacklist, in 1953. She assisted him in developing his writing ideas but stopped writing on her own. She died in 1999, while Bezzerides lived until 2007.

== Selected filmography ==
- 1952 Ruby Gentry (screenplay)
- 1952 Rancho Notorious (original story)
- 1951 Battle of Powder River (screenplay)
- 1947 Secret Beyond the Door... (screenplay)
- 1947 Possessed (screenplay)
