= Robert Taylor (American actor) =

American actor (1911–1969)

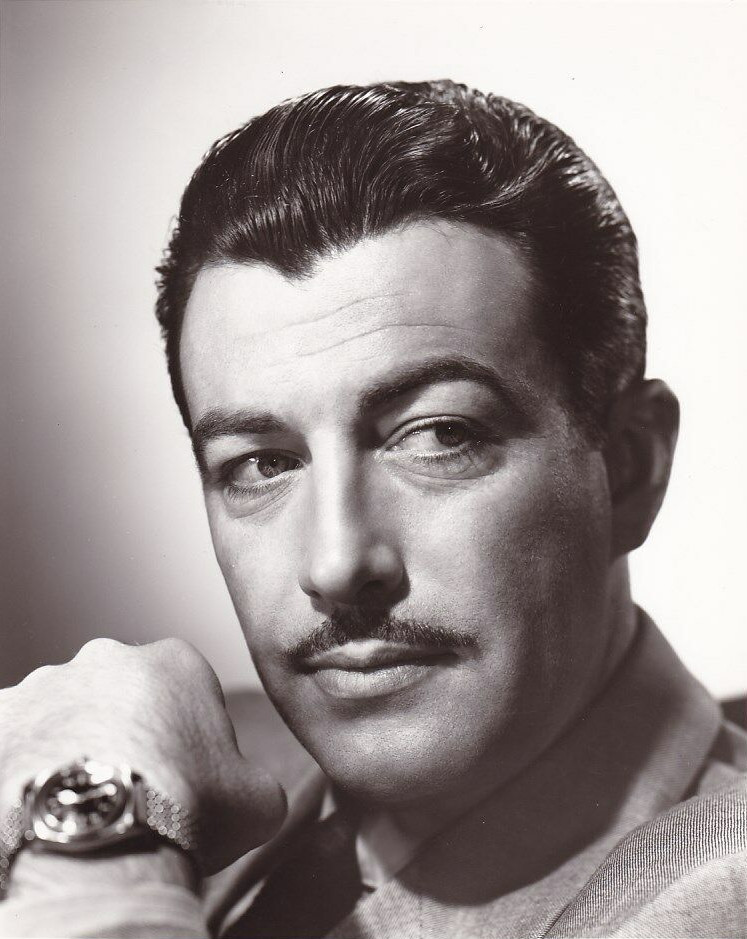
- Taylor in 1946
- Born: Spangler Arlington Brugh; August 5, 1911; Filley, Nebraska, U.S.
- Died: June 8, 1969 (aged 57); Santa Monica, California, U.S.
- Resting place: Forest Lawn Memorial Park, Glendale, California
- Education: Doane College; Pomona College
- Occupation: Actor
- Years active: 1934–1968
- Spouses: Barbara Stanwyck (m. 1939; div. 1952) Ursula Thiess (m. 1954)
- Children: 3

Robert Taylor (born Spangler Arlington Brugh; August 5, 1911 – June 8, 1969) was an American film and television actor and singer who was one of the most popular leading men of his era.

Taylor began his career in films in 1934 when he signed with Metro-Goldwyn-Mayer. He won his first leading role the following year in Magnificent Obsession. His popularity increased during the late 1930s and 1940s with appearances in Camille (1936), A Yank at Oxford (1938), Waterloo Bridge (1940), and Bataan (1943). During World War II, he served in the United States Naval Air Forces, where he worked as a flight instructor and appeared in instructional films. From 1959 to 1962, he starred in the television series The Detectives Starring Robert Taylor. In 1966, he assumed hosting duties from his friend Ronald Reagan on the series Death Valley Days.

Taylor was married to actress Barbara Stanwyck from 1939 to 1952. He married actress Ursula Thiess in 1954, and they had two children. A chain smoker, Taylor died of lung cancer at the age of 57.

== Early life ==
Taylor was born Spangler Arlington Brugh on August 5, 1911, in Filley, Nebraska, the only child of Ruth Adaline (née Stanhope) and Spangler Andrew Brugh, a farmer turned doctor. During his early life, the family moved several times, living in Muskogee, Oklahoma; Kirksville, Missouri; and Fremont, Nebraska. By September 1917, the Brughs had moved to Beatrice, Nebraska, where they remained for 16 years.

As a teenager, Brugh was a track and field star and played the cello in his high school orchestra. Upon graduation, he enrolled at Doane College in Crete, Nebraska. While at Doane, he took cello lessons from Professor Herbert E. Gray, whom he admired and idolized. After Professor Gray announced he was accepting a new position at Pomona College in Claremont, California, Brugh moved to California and enrolled at Pomona. He joined the campus theater company and also studied with Neely Dickson at the Hollywood Community Theater. Recalled Dickson, "I couldn’t help remembering the first time he came to me, a handsome, young college graduate from Pomona. He was raw, but very sincere and wholly unaffected. He stood before me, voice a little tight from nervousness, and read a scene from his favorite play... I was impressed and did all I could for him." He was eventually spotted by an MGM talent scout in 1932 after a production of Journey's End.

== Career ==
He signed a seven-year contract with Metro-Goldwyn-Mayer with an initial salary of $35 per week, which rose to $2500 by 1936. The studio changed his name to Robert Taylor. He made his film debut in the 1934 comedy Handy Andy, starring Will Rogers (on loan to Fox Studios).

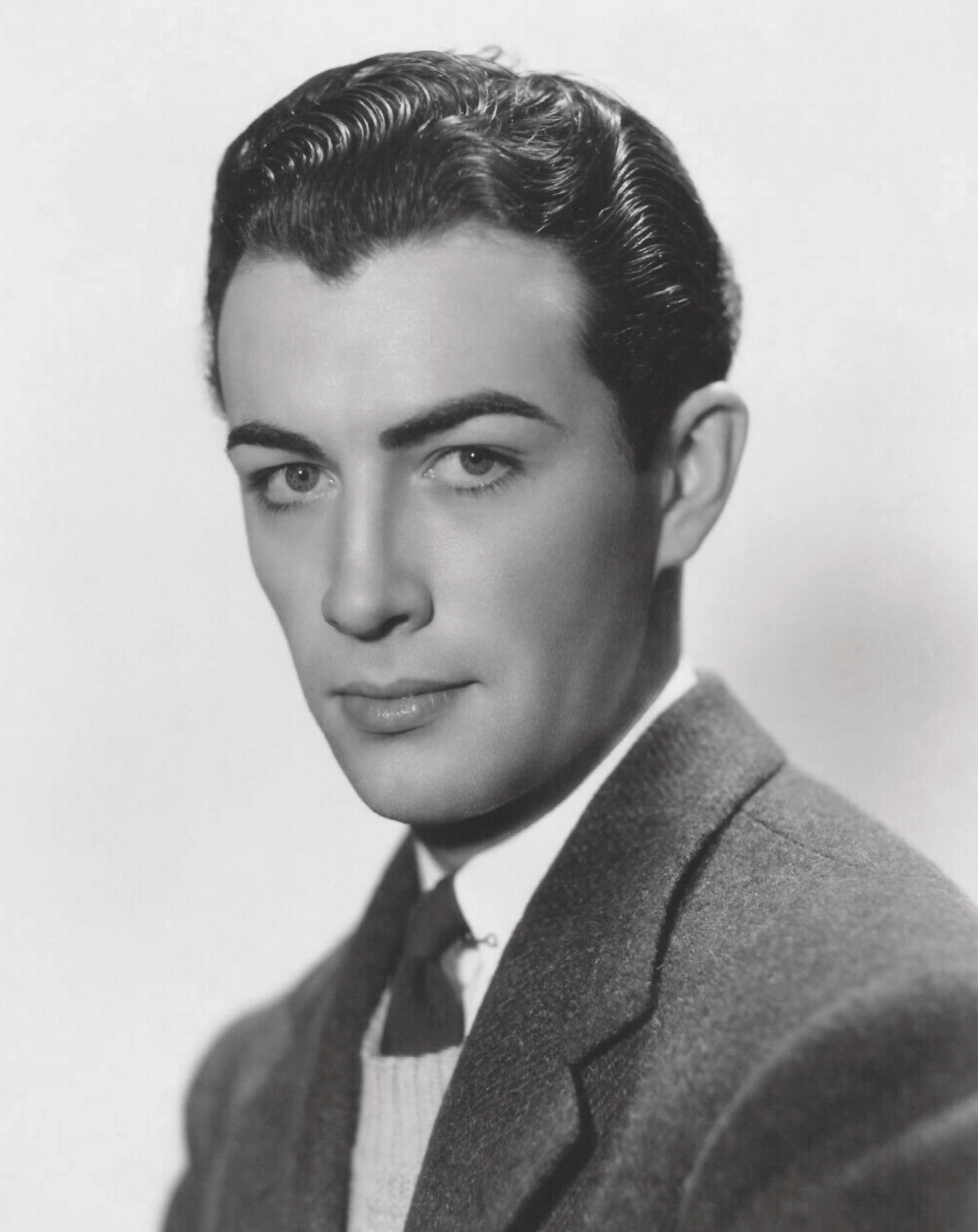
Robert Taylor, 1934

His first leading role came by accident. In 1934, Taylor was on the MGM payroll as "the test boy," a male juvenile who would be filmed opposite various young ingenues in screen tests. In late 1934, when MGM began production of its new short-subject series Crime Does Not Pay with the dramatic short Buried Loot, the actor who had been cast fell ill and could not appear. The director sent for the test boy to substitute for the missing actor. Taylor's dramatic performance, as an embezzler who deliberately disfigures himself to avoid detection, was so memorable that Taylor immediately was signed for feature films.

In 1935, Irene Dunne requested him for her leading man in Magnificent Obsession. This was followed by Camille opposite Greta Garbo.

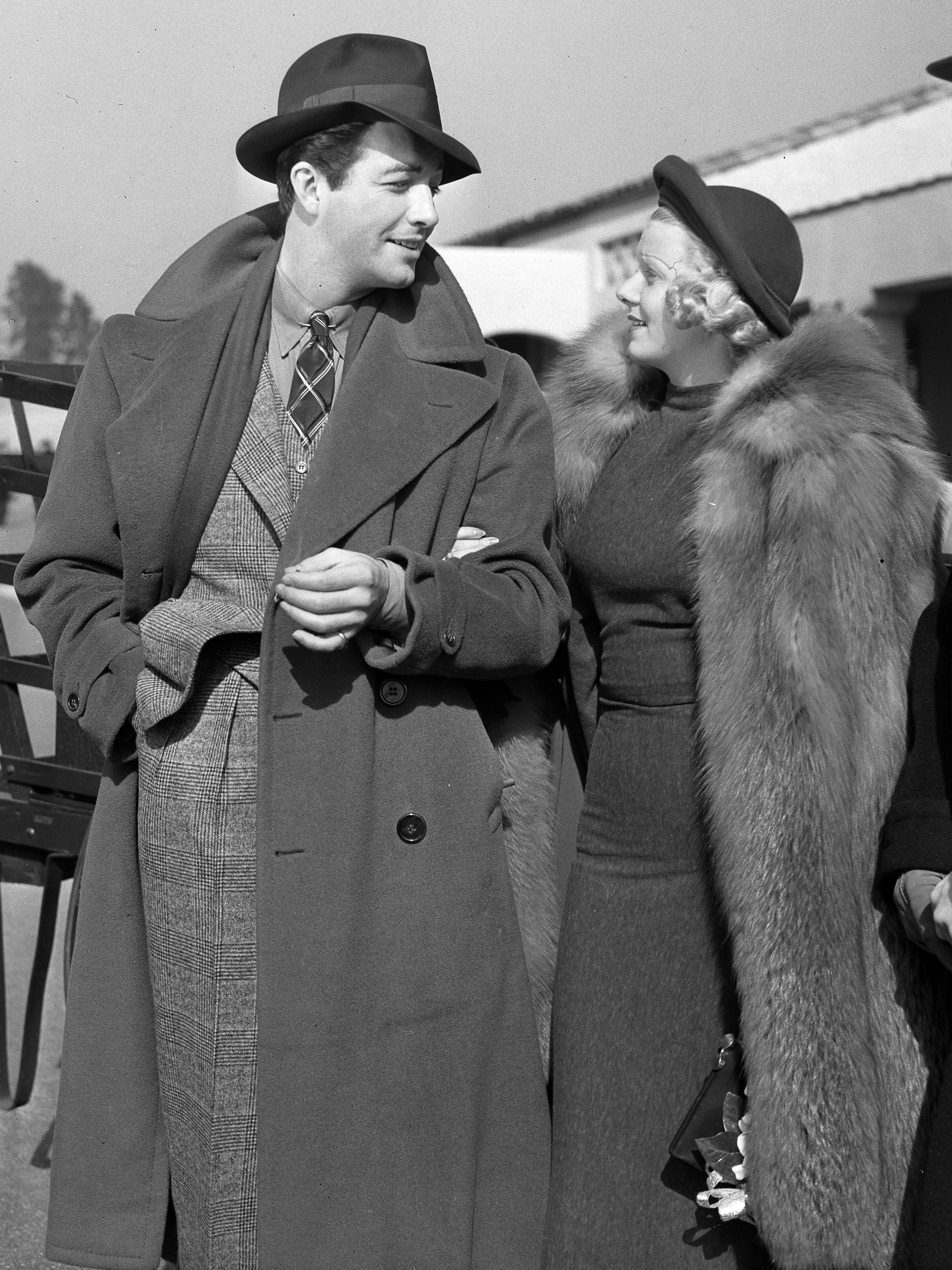
Taylor and Jean Harlow, 1937

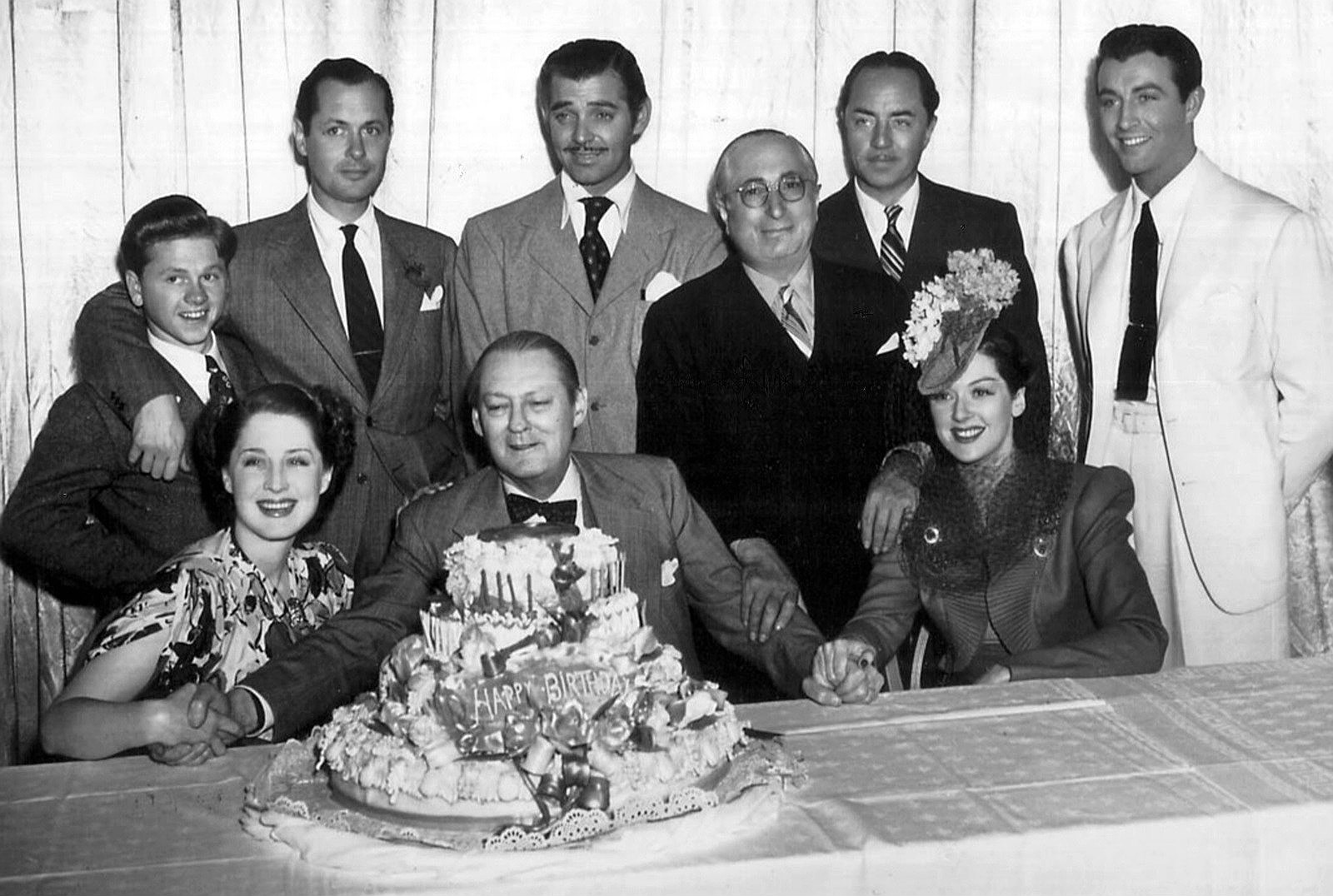
Lionel Barrymore's 61st birthday in 1939, standing: Mickey Rooney, Robert Montgomery, Clark Gable, Louis B. Mayer, William Powell, Robert Taylor, seated: Norma Shearer, Lionel Barrymore, and Rosalind Russell

Throughout the late 1930s, Taylor appeared in films of varying genres including the musicals Broadway Melody of 1936 and Broadway Melody of 1938, and the British comedy A Yank at Oxford with Vivien Leigh. Throughout 1940 and 1941 he argued in favor of American entry into World War II, and was sharply critical of the isolationist movement. During this time he said he was "100% pro-British". In 1940, he reteamed with Leigh in Mervyn LeRoy's drama Waterloo Bridge.

After being given the nickname "The Man with the Perfect Profile", Taylor began breaking away from his perfect leading man image and began appearing in darker roles beginning in 1941. That year he played the title role in Billy the Kid, followed by the same the next year in the film noir Johnny Eager with Lana Turner. After playing a tough sergeant in Bataan in 1943, Taylor contributed to the war effort by becoming a flying instructor in the U.S. Naval Air Corps. During this time, he also starred in instructional films and narrated the 1944 documentary The Fighting Lady.

After the war, he appeared in a series of edgy roles, including the neo-noir Undercurrent (1946) and drama High Wall (1947). In 1949 he co-starred with Elizabeth Taylor in the suspense Conspirator, which Hedda Hopper described as "another one of Taylor's pro-British films". Taylor responded to this by saying "And it won't be the last!" However, both Hopper and Taylor were members of the anticommunist organization the Motion Picture Alliance for the Preservation of American Ideals, as were Taylor's friends John Wayne, Walt Disney and Gary Cooper. For this reason Hopper always spoke favorably of Taylor, despite him disagreeing with her over what she saw as his "Anglophilia" and what he saw as her "Anglophobia". In 1950, Taylor landed the role of General Marcus Vinicius in Quo Vadis with Deborah Kerr. The epic film was a hit, grossing US$11 million in its first run. The following year, he starred in the film version of Walter Scott's classic Ivanhoe, followed by 1953's Knights of the Round Table and The Adventures of Quentin Durward, all filmed in England. Of the three only Ivanhoe was a critical and financial success. Taylor also filmed Valley of the Kings in Egypt in 1954. Robert Taylor received the 1953 World Film Favorite–Male, award at the Golden Globes (tied with Alan Ladd).

By the mid-1950s, Taylor began to concentrate on westerns, his preferred genre. He starred in a comedy western Many Rivers to Cross in 1955 co-starring Eleanor Parker. Taylor shared the lead with Richard Widmark in the edgy John Sturges western The Law and Jake Wade (1958). Taylor's long tenure at MGM ended in 1959; he was the last remaining major star under contract from the studio's heyday. The studio still held an option for Taylor's services, which it exercised for the western Cattle King, released in 1963.

Taylor formed his own company, Robert Taylor Productions, starring in the television series The Detectives Starring Robert Taylor (1959–1962). Following the end of the series in 1962, Taylor continued to appear in films and television shows, including A House Is Not a Home, and two episodes of Hondo.

In 1964, Taylor co-starred with his former wife Barbara Stanwyck in William Castle's psychological horror film The Night Walker. In 1965, after filming Johnny Tiger in Florida, Taylor took over the role of narrator in the television series Death Valley Days when Ronald Reagan left to pursue a career in politics. Taylor would remain with the series until his death in 1969.

Taylor traveled to Europe to film Savage Pampas (1966), The Glass Sphinx (1967), and The Day the Hot Line Got Hot (1968).

== Personal life ==
=== Marriages and children ===
After dating her for three years, Taylor married Barbara Stanwyck on May 14, 1939, in San Diego, California. Zeppo Marx's wife, Marion, was Stanwyck's matron of honor. Stanwyck's surrogate father—he was her sister Millie's husband—and personal assistant, vaudevillian Buck Mack, was Taylor's best man. Stanwyck divorced Taylor in February 1951. During the marriage, Stanwyck's adopted son from her previous marriage to Frank Fay, Anthony "Tony" Dion, lived with them. After the divorce, Stanwyck retained custody of the child.

Taylor met German actress Ursula Thiess in 1952. They married in Jackson Hole, Wyoming, on May 23, 1954. They had two children, a son, Terrance, (1955) and a daughter, Tessa, (1959). Taylor was stepfather to Thiess' two children from her previous marriage, Manuela and Michael Thiess. On May 26, 1969, shortly before Taylor's death from lung cancer, Ursula Thiess found the body of her son, Michael, in a West Los Angeles motel room. He had died from a drug overdose. One month before his death, Michael had been released from a mental hospital. In 1964, he spent a year in a reformatory for attempting to poison his biological father with insecticide.

=== Politics ===
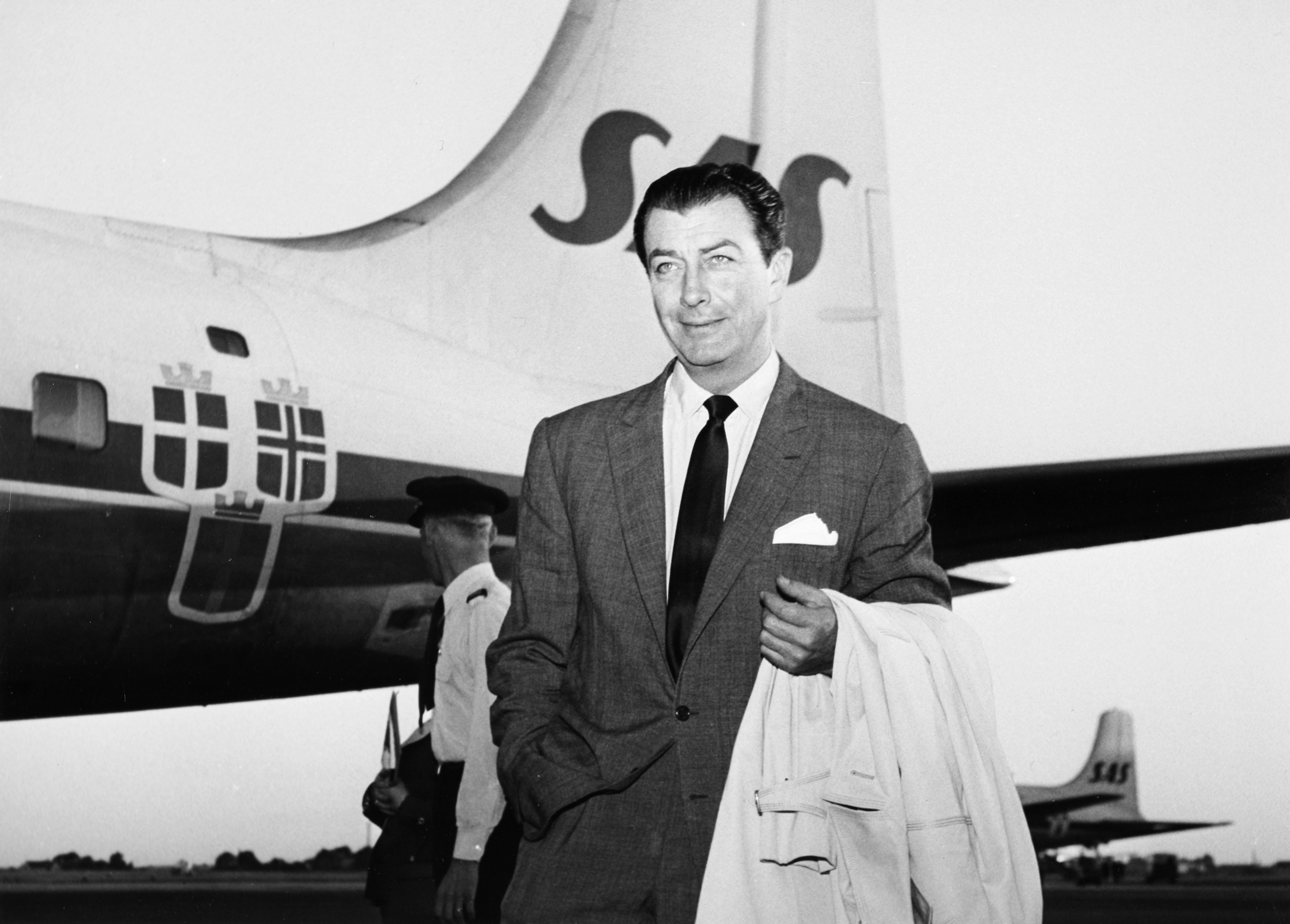
Robert Taylor in 1957

In February 1944, Taylor helped found the Motion Picture Alliance for the Preservation of American Ideals. In October 1947, Taylor was called to testify before the House Committee on Un-American Activities regarding Communism in Hollywood. He did this reluctantly, regarding the hearings as a "circus" and refusing to appear unless subpoenaed. In his testimony concerning the Screen Actors Guild (SAG), delivered on October 22, 1947, Taylor stated: "It seems to me that at meetings, especially meetings of the general membership of the Guild, there was always a certain group of actors and actresses whose every action would indicate to me that, if they are not Communists, they are working awfully hard to be Communists." Two people already under investigation by the FBI, Karen Morley and Howard Da Silva, were mentioned as troublemakers at SAG meetings. Taylor alleged that at meetings of the SAG, Da Silva "always had something to say at the wrong time." Da Silva was blacklisted on Broadway and New York radio, and Morley never worked again after her name surfaced at the hearings. Taylor went on to declare that he would refuse to work with anyone who was suspected of being a Communist: "I'm afraid it would have to be him or me because life is too short to be around people who annoy me as much as these fellow-travelers and Communists do". Taylor also labeled screenwriter Lester Cole "reputedly a Communist", adding "I would not know personally". After the hearings, Taylor's films were banned in Communist Hungary and in Czechoslovakia, and Communists called for a boycott of his films in France.

In 1951, Taylor remarked "I speak out against communism now for the same reason I spoke out against Nazism a decade ago, because I am pro-freedom and pro-decency." He helped narrate the 1952 anticommunist public service documentary The Hoaxters, which compared the threat of international communism in the 1950s to the threat of Nazism in the 1930s and 1940s.

Taylor supported Barry Goldwater in the 1964 United States presidential election and Ronald Reagan in the 1966 California gubernatorial election.

=== Flying ===
In 1952, Taylor starred in the film Above and Beyond, a biopic of Enola Gay pilot Paul Tibbets. The two men met and found that they had much in common. Both had considered studying medicine, and were avid skeet-shooters and fliers. Taylor learned to fly in the mid-1930s, and served as a United States Navy flying instructor during World War II. His private aircraft was a Twin Beech called "Missy" (his then-wife Stanwyck's nickname) which he used on hunting and fishing trips and to fly to locations for filming.

=== Ranch ===
Taylor owned a 34-room house situated on 112 acres (0.45 km^{2}) located in Mandeville Canyon in the Brentwood section of Los Angeles. Dubbed the Robert Taylor Ranch, the property was sold to KROQ-FM owner Ken Roberts in the 1970s. Roberts remodeled the home and put it back on the market in 1990 for $45 million. He later reduced the price to $35 million, but the ranch failed to attract a buyer. In 2010, the ranch was seized by New Stream Capital, a hedge fund, after Roberts failed to repay a high interest loan he had taken from them.

In November 2012, the Robert Taylor Ranch was put up for auction by the trust that owned it. It was purchased for $12 million by a Chicago buyer in December 2012.

== Death ==
In October 1968, Taylor underwent surgery to remove a portion of his right lung after doctors suspected that he had contracted coccidioidomycosis (known as "valley fever"). During the surgery, doctors discovered that he had lung cancer. Taylor, who had smoked three packs of cigarettes a day since he was a boy, quit smoking shortly before undergoing surgery. During the final months of his life, he was hospitalized seven times due to infections and complications related to the disease. He died of lung cancer on June 8, 1969, at Saint John's Health Center in Santa Monica, California.

Taylor's funeral was held at Forest Lawn Memorial Park Cemetery, in Glendale, California. Long-time friend Ronald Reagan (who was then the governor of California) eulogized Taylor. Among the mourners were Robert Stack, Van Heflin, Eva Marie Saint, Walter Pidgeon, Keenan Wynn, Mickey Rooney, George Murphy, Audrey Totter and Taylor's former wife Barbara Stanwyck.

For his contribution to the motion picture industry, Robert Taylor has a star on the Hollywood Walk of Fame at 1500 Vine Street.

== Filmography ==
Film
Year	Title	Role	Notes
1934	Handy Andy	Lloyd Burmeister	
1934	The Spectacle Maker	The Duchess's Paramour	Short subject Uncredited
1934	There's Always Tomorrow	Arthur White	Alternative title: Too Late for Love
1934	A Wicked Woman	Bill Renton—Rosanne's Love	
1934	Crime Does Not Pay #1: Buried Loot	Al Douglas	Short subject Uncredited
1935	Society Doctor	Dr. Ellis	
1935	Times Square Lady	Steven J. "Steve" Gordon	
1935	West Point of the Air	"Jasky" Jaskarelli	
1935	Murder in the Fleet	Lt. Randolph	
1935	Broadway Melody of 1936	Robert Gordon	
1935	La Fiesta de Santa Barbara	Himself	Short subject
1935	Magnificent Obsession	Dr. Robert Merrick	
1936	Small Town Girl	Dr. Robert "Bob" Dakin	Alternative title: One Horse Town
1936	Private Number	Richard Winfield	
1936	His Brother's Wife	Chris Claybourne	
1936	The Gorgeous Hussy	"Bow" Timberlake	
1936	Camille	Armand Duval	
1937	Personal Property	Raymond Dabney aka Ferguson	Alternative title: The Man in Possession
1937	This Is My Affair	Lt. Richard L. Perry	
1937	Lest We Forget	Himself	Short subject
1937	Broadway Melody of 1938	Stephan "Steve" Raleigh	
1938	A Yank at Oxford	Lee Sheridan	
1938	Three Comrades	Erich Lohkamp	
1938	The Crowd Roars	Tommy "Killer" McCoy	
1939	Stand Up and Fight	Blake Cantrell	
1939	Lucky Night	Bill Overton	
1939	Lady of the Tropics	William "Bill" Carey	
1939	Remember?	Jeffrey "Jeff" Holland	
1940	Waterloo Bridge	Roy Cronin	
1940	Escape	Mark Preysing	Alternative title: When the Door Opened
1940	Flight Command	Ensign Alan Drake	
1941	Billy the Kid	Billy Bonney	
1941	When Ladies Meet	Jimmy Lee	
1942	Johnny Eager	John "Johnny" Eager	
1942	Her Cardboard Lover	Terry Trindale	
1942	Stand By for Action	Lieutenant Gregg Masterman	Alternative title: Cargo of Innocents
1943	Bataan	Sergeant Bill Dane	
1943	The Youngest Profession	Cameo	
1944	Song of Russia	John Meredith	
1944	The Fighting Lady	Narrator	Credited as Lieut Robert Taylor USNR
1946	Undercurrent	Alan Garroway	
1947	High Wall	Steven Kenet	
1949	The Bribe	Rigby	
1949	Conspirator	Major Michael Curragh	
1950	Ambush	Ward Kinsman	
1950	Devil's Doorway	Lance Poole	
1951	Challenge the Wilderness	Himself	Short subject
1951	Quo Vadis	Marcus Vinicius	
1951	Westward the Women	Buck Wyatt	
1952	Ivanhoe	Sir Wilfred of Ivanhoe	
1952	Above and Beyond	Lieutenant Colonel Paul W. Tibbets	
1952	The Hoaxters	Narrator	
1953	I Love Melvin	Himself	
1953	Ride, Vaquero!	Rio	
1953	All the Brothers Were Valiant	Joel Shore	
1953	Knights of the Round Table	Lancelot	
1954	Valley of the Kings	Mark Brandon	
1954	Rogue Cop	Det. Sgt. Christopher Kelvaney	
1955	Many Rivers to Cross	Bushrod Gentry	
1955	The Adventures of Quentin Durward	Quentin Durward	
1956	The Last Hunt	Charlie Gilson	
1956	D-Day the Sixth of June	Captain Brad Parker	
1956	The Power and the Prize	Cliff Barton	
1957	Tip on a Dead Jockey	Lloyd Tredman	
1958	The Law and Jake Wade	Jake Wade	
1958	Saddle the Wind	Steve Sinclair	
1958	Party Girl	Thomas "Tommy" Farrell	
1959	The Hangman	Mackenzie Bovard	
1959	The House of the Seven Hawks	Nordley	
1960	Killers of Kilimanjaro	Robert Adamson	
1963	Miracle of the White Stallions	Colonel Podhajsky	Alternative title: The Flight of the White Stallions
1963	Cattle King	Sam Brassfield	Alternative title: Cattle King of Wyoming
1964	A House Is Not a Home	Frank Costigan	
1964	The Night Walker	Barry Morland	
1966	Johnny Tiger	George Dean	
1966	Savage Pampas	Captain Martin	
1967	The Glass Sphinx	Prof. Karl Nichols	
1967	Return of the Gunfighter	Ben Wyatt	
1968	Where Angels Go, Trouble Follows	Mr. Farriday – The 'In' Group	
1968	The Day the Hot Line Got Hot	Anderson	Alternative title: Hot Line

Television
Year	Title	Role	Notes
1958	The Thin Man	Himself	Episode: "The Scene Stealer"
1959–1962	The Detectives Starring Robert Taylor	Det. Capt. Matt Holbrook	97 episodes
1963	The Dick Powell Show	Guest host	Episode: "Colossus"
1966–1969	Death Valley Days	Host	77 episodes
1967	Hondo	Gallagher	2 episodes

=== Box-office ranking ===
- 1936 - 4th (US)
- 1937 - 3rd (US), 8th (UK)
- 1938 - 6th (US), 7th (UK)
- 1939 - 14th (US), 4th (UK)
- 1941 - 21st (US)

== Radio appearances ==
Year	Program	Episode/source
1942	The Screen Guild Theater	My Favorite Wife
1943	Lux Radio Theatre	The Philadelphia Story
1945	Suspense	The Argyle Album
1946	The Screen Guild Theater	Waterloo Bridge
1946	Suspense	The House in Cypress Canyon
1952	Lux Radio Theatre	Westward the Women
1953	Theater of Stars	Mail Order
