= Stronger Than Desire =

1939 film by Leslie Fenton

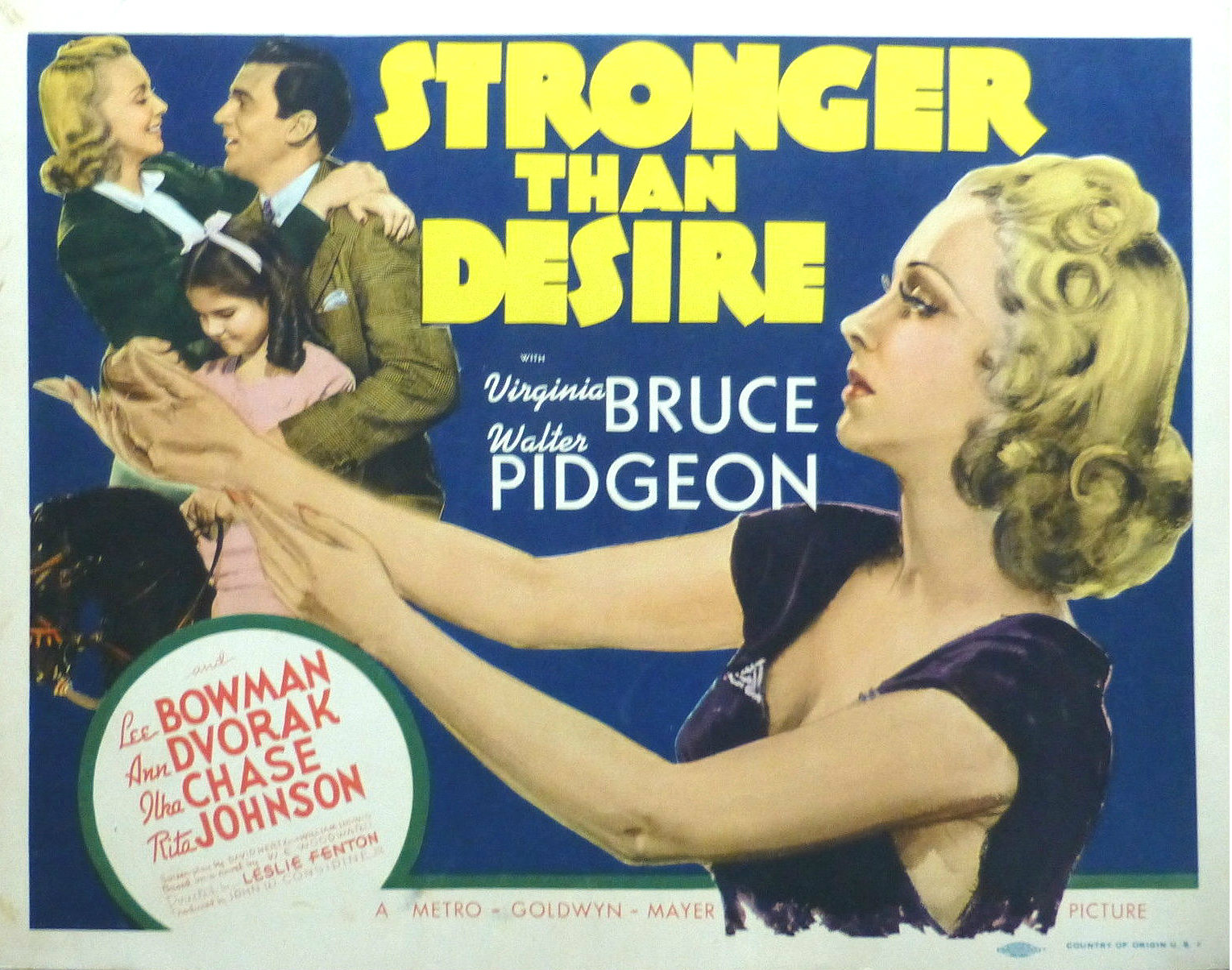
- Lobby card
- Directed by: Leslie Fenton
- Written by: David Hertz; William Ludwig; Lenore J. Coffee; Howard Emmett Rogers
- Based on: Evelyn Prentice; 1933 novel by W. E. Woodward
- Produced by: John W. Considine Jr.
- Starring: Virginia Bruce; Walter Pidgeon; Lee Bowman; Ann Dvorak; Ilka Chase; Rita Johnson
- Cinematography: William H. Daniels
- Edited by: W. Donn Hayes
- Music by: David Snell
- Production company: Metro-Goldwyn-Mayer
- Distributed by: Metro-Goldwyn-Mayer
- Release date: June 30, 1939
- Running time: 80 minutes
- Country: United States
- Language: English
- Budget: $258,000
- Box office: $423,000

Stronger Than Desire is a 1939 American drama film directed by Leslie Fenton and starring Virginia Bruce, Walter Pidgeon and Ann Dvorak. It is a remake of 1934 film Evelyn Prentice, itself based on the 1933 novel Evelyn Prentice by W. E. Woodward. The film's sets were designed by the art director Edwin B. Willis, overseen by Cedric Gibbons.

== Plot ==
Believing her husband Tyler has been seeing another woman, Barbara Winter, behind her back, Elizabeth Flagg begins a relationship with Michael McLain, who then blackmails her with her love letters. During a struggle for the letters, a gun goes off, McLain falls and Elizabeth flees. But police find McLain's wife, Eva, near the body and charge her with murder.

With a guilty conscience, Elizabeth asks her husband, a lawyer, to defend Eva in court. He endeavors to prove someone else did the shooting, unaware his own wife was directly involved. Eva eventually confesses, but is set free when it is determined that she acted in self-defense.

== Cast ==
- Virginia Bruce as Elizabeth Flagg
- Walter Pidgeon as Tyler Flagg
- Lee Bowman as Michael McLain
- Ann Dvorak as Eva McLain
- Ilka Chase as Jo Brennan
- Rita Johnson as Barbara Winter
- Richard Lane as Jerry Brody
- Ann Todd as Susan Flagg
- Paul Stanton as Assistant D.A. Galway
- Ferike Boros as Mrs. D'Amoro

Uncredited

- King Baggot as Juror
- Barbara Bedford as Miss Watson - Flagg's Secretary
- Leonard Carey as Albert - Flagg's Butler
- Donald Douglas as Mack Clark - Flagg's Investigator
- Margaret Bert as Sara - Susan's Nursemaid
- Alphonse Martell as Headwaiter
- Louis Jean Heydt as Court Appointed Attorney
- Arthur Housman as Reporter
- Tom Neal as Reporter
- Mariska Aldrich as Police Matron
- Amzie Strickland as Flagg's Party Guest
- Reed Hadley as Flagg's Party Guest

== Reception ==
According to MGM records the film earned $263,000 in the US and Canada and $160,000 elsewhere, making a profit of $1,000.
