= The Young One =

1960 film by Luis Buñuel

- Spanish: La joven
- Directed by: Luis Buñuel
- Written by: H. B. Addis; Luis Buñuel
- Based on: "Travelin' Man" by Peter Matthiessen
- Produced by: George P. Werker
- Starring: Zachary Scott; Bernie Hamilton; Key Meersman
- Cinematography: Gabriel Figueroa
- Edited by: Carlos Savage
- Production company: Producciones Olmeca
- Distributed by: Valiant Films
- Release dates: 5 May 1960 (Cannes); 18 January 1961 (United States); 4 August 1961 (Mexico)
- Running time: 95 minutes
- Country: Mexico
- Languages: English; Spanish

The Young One (Spanish: La joven) (released as White Trash in the United States and Island of Shame in the United Kingdom) is a 1960 English-language Mexican drama film directed and co-written by Luis Buñuel, and starring Zachary Scott, Bernie Hamilton, Key Meersman, Crahan Denton and Claudio Brook. "Inspired by" the story "Travelin' Man" by Peter Matthiessen, the film deals with issues such as racism and statutory rape by depicting the interactions between two men and a teenage girl on a private island game preserve.

It was Buñuel's second (and last) film in English, following Robinson Crusoe (1954); both were co-written by Hugo Butler (under the pseudonym H. B. Addis) and produced by George Pepper (as George P. Werker), Americans who had moved to Mexico after being blacklisted in Hollywood based on their alleged membership of, or sympathy with the Communist Party USA. The Young One was screened in competition at the 1960 Cannes Film Festival, and has received highly positive reviews since its release.

== Plot ==
When a white woman accuses him of raping her, Traver, a black clarinetist in a touring jazz band, steals a small boat to escape a lynch mob. He travels until the outboard motor runs out of gas, at which point he paddles to an island off the Carolina coast that is a private game preserve. It is not hunting season, so the island's only inhabitants are the caretakers Miller and Pee-Wee and Pee-Wee's teenage granddaughter Evalyn.

Pee-Wee dies the same morning Traver comes to the island. Miller says he did not approve of how the elderly drunkard was raising Evvie, and he intends to put her in the care of the church and send her to the mainland so she can attend school. After he has her clean herself up and brush her wild hair, however, he notices she is growing up and comes on to her. Evvie escapes Miller's cabin and locks herself in hers with Pee-Wee's corpse.

The next day, Jackson arrives on the island with supplies. He and Miller bury Pee-Wee, and Miller leaves with Jackson to alert the authorities to the death. Miller had told Evvie that she could go to town with Jackson, but now says he changed his mind.

Thinking herself alone on the island, Evvie goes to work at the apiary until Traver appears and begs her for something to eat. She is initially frightened, but the dime he pays her for some honey and an apple puts her at ease, and she takes him back to Miller's cabin for a real meal. Evvie tries to stop Traver from taking some food and gas and a shotgun with him when he goes, though she relents when he gives her twenty dollars. Traver accidentally shoots a hole in his boat and gets supplies to repair it from Evvie.

Miller returns in the morning, and Evvie, who does not think Traver is still on the island, tells him about Traver's visit. She does not mention the twenty dollars, so Miller takes a rifle and goes to look for the thief. Traver had fallen asleep before finishing his repairs, but he is just about to leave when he hears Miller approaching. He gets away on foot, and Miller shoots four holes in the boat and begins to track Traver through the woods. Sighting Traver crossing a swamp in a boat he has found, Miller fires a shot. Although Traver splashes into the water, he emerges unscathed out of Miller's view.

That night, Miller presents Evvie with a new dress and some high heel shoes. He tries to kiss her, but she pulls away, and he sees the twenty-dollar bill pinned to the inside of Evvie's old dress. Miller angrily demands to know what Evvie gave Traver in exchange for so much money, not believing the truth. After Evvie goes to bed, Traver bursts in with the shotgun to get his motor, which Miller had taken, and Miller's rifle. He explains he is not a thief because he paid for the supplies he took, inadvertently corroborating Evvie's story.

In the morning, Miller gives Evvie the money back. She goes to see Traver, who is fixing his boat, but their conversation is interrupted when Miller shows up. The tension is defused somewhat when the men discover they were both in the army and took part in the liberation of Italy during WWII.

Later, Traver comes to the cabins to keep an eye on Miller while his boat soaks overnight. Evvie gets Traver to play his clarinet, and she dances until Miller gets a hand grenade and throws it. He says he has two more, so Traver does not have the upper hand, even with the guns, and should just give them back, which Traver does that evening. Miller moves Evvie into his cabin so Traver can stay in hers, and, while Traver plays the clarinet, Miller rapes Evvie.

There is a rainstorm the following day, and, to interrupt a fraught racial conversation, Evvie asks Traver to play some music. When he goes to get his clarinet, Jackson arrives unexpectedly with Reverend Fleetwood, who has come to perform a funeral service and take Evvie to a children's home. Jackson mentions that a black musician raped a white woman, and Miller realizes why Traver is on the island. Traver snuck away when the visitors came, so Miller and Jackson do not find him in Evvie's cabin, and they decide to wait until morning to continue their search, as it is still raining and Jackson has the keys to his boat and Miller has Traver's motor and oars.

While Miller and Jackson hunt Traver, the Reverend, who has suspicions about Miller's treatment of Evvie, baptizes Evvie, though she fails to see the value of the ritual. Evvie and the Reverend find Traver stuck in one of Miller's animal traps and bring him to the cabins to address his wounded leg. Traver declares his innocence and the Reverend believes him after he says who made the claim against him, as the woman is a drunk and falsely accused a white man of raping her two years ago. Miller and Jackson return and tie Traver up, planning to take him to the mainland the next day. The Reverend says he will testify on Traver's behalf, but Traver says he does not expect to live long enough to see his trial.

After dark, Traver convinces Evvie to set him free. The Reverend confronts Miller about Evvie and Miller confirms the rape, though he defends his actions and asks the Reverend not to report him. After Jackson, who is an even bigger racist than Miller, leaves to find and kill Traver in the morning, the Reverend appeals to Miller, ending by pointing out what a hypocrite he is being. Miller asks if the Reverend would still turn him in if he married Evvie, and the Reverend says he would have to ask his superiors.

Miller finds Jackson, takes his gun, and tells him to get off the island. Traver, who slept in a shed, limps up to Evvie and the Reverend just as Miller returns to the cabins. To everyone's surprise, Miller gives Traver his oars to use as crutches and offers to carry his motor to his boat so he can leave. Evvie goes with the Reverend, but Miller says he will visit her in town soon.

Jackson intercepts Traver and attacks him with a knife. Traver defends himself with an oar and gets the knife, but he is able to stop himself from killing Jackson. Evvie and the Reverend leave with Jackson and Miller helps Traver launch his boat, leaving Miller alone on the island.

== Cast ==
- Zachary Scott as "Hap" Miller
- Bernie Hamilton as Traveling Man aka "Traver"
- Key Meersman as Evalyn "Evvie" Stroud
- Crahan Denton as Jackson
- Claudio Brook as Rev. Fleetwood

== Reception ==
On the review aggregator website Rotten Tomatoes, the film has a 100% approval rating based reviews from eight critics, with an average score of 8.3/10. Jonathan Rosenbaum called the film “Buñuel's neglected masterpiece”.
