= Mariska Aldrich =

American actress (1881–1965)

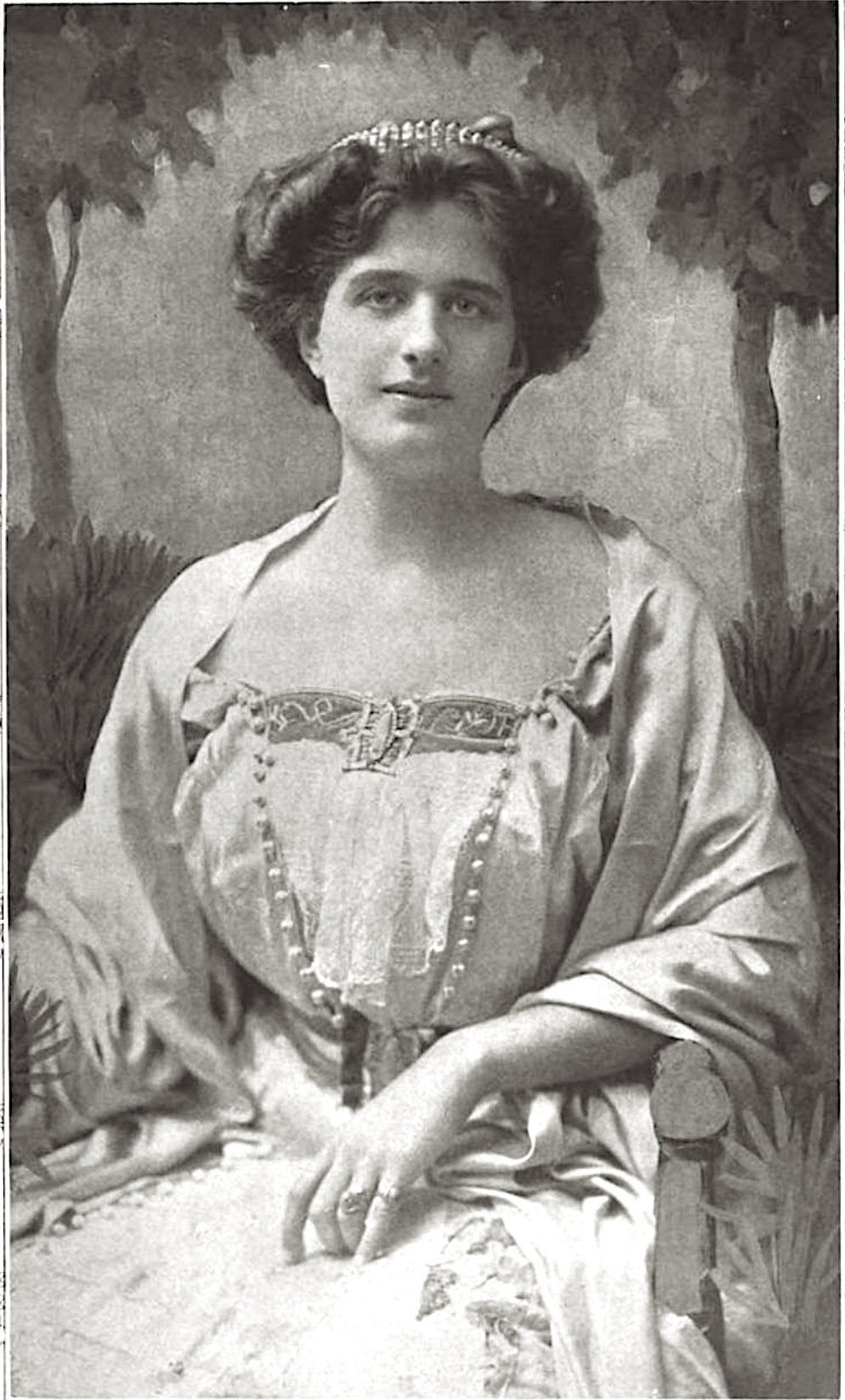
- Mariska Aldrich, 1909
- Born: Mariska Horvath; March 27, 1881; Boston, Massachusetts, U.S.
- Died: September 28, 1965 (aged 84); Los Angeles, California, U.S.
- Other names: Matilda Agan; Mathilde Agan; Mariska Agan; Mariska Aldrich-Davis; Mrs. Emmett Davis
- Occupations: Actress; singer
- Years active: 1900–1946
- Spouse(s): J. Frank Aldrich (m. 1901; div. 1915) William E. S. Davis (m. 1917; div. 1926)

Mariska Horvath, known by her married name Mariska Aldrich and prior to her marriage as Matilda Agan, Mathilde Agan or Mariska Agan, (March 27, 1881 – September 28, 1965) was an American singer, actress, and voice teacher. Born in Boston and raised in Brooklyn, Mariska studied singing in New York and London before appearing in her first operas in Europe in 1900 under conductor Auguste Vianesi. In 1901 she married former United States congressman J. Frank Aldrich, and later that same year made her debut at the Royal Opera House, Covent Garden as the Witch in Humperdinck's Hansel and Gretel. She ceased performing to start a family, giving birth to two children early in her marriage to Aldrich. Their daughter, the stage and film actress Meeka Aldrich, was born in 1903. After this she studied singing at the Institute of Musical Art (now the Juilliard School) and privately with teachers in New York and Europe.

Aldrich resumed her career as a contralto with Oscar Hammerstein I's opera company in the 1908–1909 season. Standing six feet tall, her height was often remarked upon in reviews. She performed with the Metropolitan Opera in 1910-1911 during which time her repertoire expanded into mezzo-soprano and dramatic soprano repertoire. In 1912 she went to Europe where she performed both mezzo-soprano and dramatic soprano roles in opera houses in the years leading up to World War I. With the outbreak of the war she returned to the United States and mainly ceased performing in opera with one notable exception being the roles of Fricka and Brünnhilde in Wagner's Ring cycle at Carnegie Hall in 1924. She divorced her first husband in 1915. She continued to perform as a concert mezzo-soprano with orchestras, in recitals, on radio, and in vaudeville. After her second marriage to architect William Emmett Swindell Davis in 1917 she was known as Mariska Aldrich-Davis or Mrs. Emmett Davis. That marriage also ended in divorce in 1926 after which she was once again known as Mariska Aldrich.

In 1924 Aldrich had success as a dramatic actress on Broadway as the Abbess in Karl Vollmöller's play The Miracle, a show which she later toured in 1926-1927. She returned to Broadway in the plays The Cradle Song (1927) and Lysistrata (1930). In the early 1930s she was involved in hosting television programs on W2XCR in the infancy of that medium. In her later career she worked predominantly as a character actress in theatre and in film in California while concurrently teaching singing out of a private studio in Los Angeles until her death in 1965 at the age of 84. The School of Music at the University of Utah holds the Mariska Aldrich Archive (MAA) which contains a large collection of historical recordings, scores, photographs, and other materials that belonged to Aldrich or were collected by her daughter Meeka. The MAA is one of the largest sound libraries in the United States.

== Early life and education ==
Mariska Aldrich was born with the name Mariska Horvath in Boston, Massachusetts on March 27, 1881. She was listed as adopted in the U.S., Selected States Dutch Reformed Church Membership Records, 1701-1995 in which her birth name is given as Mariska Horvath and her adopted name as Matilda Rosa Agan. The adopted daughter of David Agan and the biological daughter of Agan's wife Jennie Agan (née Mehesy), Matilda Agan (Note: Some sources state she was born Mariska Horvath. Her father's name was given as Dr. David N. Agan at the time of her marriage and newspaper records refer to her mother as Jennie Agan or Jane Agan. Her adopted father was American and was born David Henry Agan in Troy, New York on June 7, 1848, and died in Manhattan on November 6, 1912. Her mother was named as Jennie Howath on her marriage certificate to Dr. David Agan issued in Manhattan on June 29, 1892. However, the Horvath spelling of her mother's name was used earlier in the 1880 census record in which she is listed the wife of Victor Horvath. Her mother's name is given as Jennie Mehesy on a previous marriage certificate to Giza Horvath on May 29, 1880. Her mother's entry in the California, U.S., Death Index, 1940-1997 gives her name as Jennie Mehesy Agan. Her mother died in Los Angeles on November 12, 1949.) was the biological daughter of Victor Horvath who was her mother Jennie's first husband. Her mother married her stepfather in 1892 when she was a year old.

It was widely reported in the press that she was the daughter of Hungarian immigrants to the United States; however, her biological father was listed as Austrian in census records and her stepfather was an American who was born in Troy, New York. Her mother was from Hungary and was born in Budapest in 1861. Her mother was referred to as Jennie or Jane Agan in newspaper publications. Her stepfather worked as a physician in New York City and was a graduate of Bellevue Medical College. He died in 1912.

Mariska grew up in Brooklyn, and was educated at the Academy of Saint Joseph in Brentwood, New York where she later gave a concert in 1923. She was known in newspaper publications as both Mathilde Agan and Mariska Agan when she married former United States Congressman J. Frank Aldrich on April 18, 1901. The couple had not known each other long, having met at the ball celebrating the second inauguration of William McKinley which was held at the Pension Building in Washington D.C. on March 4, 1901. Early in her marriage she gave birth to two children, Meeka and Fred. Meeka had a career as a stage and film actress.

Prior to her marriage, Mariska studied singing in New York with Luisa Cappiani and in London with Alberto Randegger. After her marriage she studied singing in both New York and Paris, France with Alfred Giraudet from 1906–1909. She also studied in London with George Henschel. She attended the Institute of Musical Art (now the Juilliard School) where Giraudet was on the voice faculty.

== Opera career ==
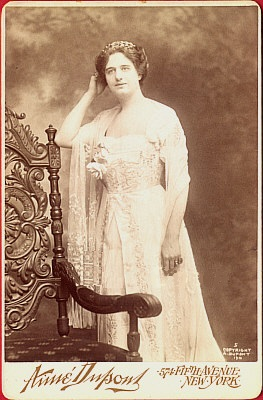
Mariska Aldrich in 1910

At the time of her marriage in 1901 Aldrich was described in the American press as a talented amateur singer, having performed in numerous charity concerts at the Waldorf-Astoria. She had, however, already appeared in professional operas in Europe conducted by Auguste Vianesi in 1900. In May 1901, a month after her marriage, she made her debut at the Royal Opera House, Covent Garden, as the Witch in Humperdinck's Hansel and Gretel with Frida Felser as Hansel.

After spending time starting a family and continuing her studies, Aldrich made her American debut with Oscar Hammerstein I's opera company at the Manhattan Opera House (MOH) on November 20, 1908, as the page Urbano in Les Huguenots with Cleofonte Campanini conducting. She was billed as a contralto at the time of her debut. A tall woman standing at six feet, her height was a point of discussion in reviews. That same month she repeated this role with Hammerstein's company at the Philadelphia Opera House with Adelina Agostinelli as Valentine, Giovanni Zenatello as Raoul de Nangis, and Alice Zeppilli as Marguerite de Valois.

Other roles Aldrich performed at both the MOH and POH in the 1908–1909 season soon followed including Lola in Mascagni's Cavalleria rusticana, both the Voice of Antonia's mother and Nicklausse in Offenbach's The Tales of Hoffmann, and Ulrica in Verdi's Un ballo in maschera. In March 1909 she toured with Hammerstein's company for performances at The Boston Theatre.

Aldrich left Hammerstein's company after signing a contract with the Metropolitan Opera ("Met") in August 1909 . The following November she was a soloist with the Pittsburgh Symphony Orchestra singing music by Jules Massenet, Johannes Brahms, and Claude Debussy. The following month she sang a concert of music by Pyotr Ilyich Tchaikovsky with the Russian Symphony Orchestra under conductor Modest Altschuler at Carnegie Hall, and gave a concert with the New York Mozart Society at the Hotel Astor.

Aldrich made her debut at the Metropolitan Opera House (Met) on March 26, 1910, as Azucena in Verdi's Il trovatore with Rita Fornia as Leonora and Riccardo Martin as Manrico. She was committed to the Met in 1910–1911 during which time her repertoire grew to include both mezzo-soprano and dramatic soprano roles. Roles she sang at the Met included Fricka in Das Rheingold, Lola in Cavalleria Rusticana, Naoia in Frederick Converse's Iolan, Or, the Pipe of Desire, and Venus in Wagner's Tannhäuser.

In May 1910 Aldrich was the contralto soloist in Handel's Judas Maccabaeus at the Cincinnati May Festival with conductor Frank Van der Stucken leading the musical forces. One of the performances was attended by American president William Howard Taft. At the invitation of Felix Mottl, she made her concert debut in Munich in 1911. After this she studied the dramatic soprano repertoire in Berlin with Emmy Raabe-Burg. She sang the role of Amneris in Verdi's Aida at the Prague State Opera in 1913. In 1914 she performed the roles of Fricka and Brünnhilde in Wagner's Ring cycle at the Theater des Westens in Berlin. She was invited to repeat the role of Brünnhilde at the 1914 Bayreuth Festival but had to decline the offer due to a scheduling conflict.

Aldrich's opera engagements were rare after 1914. In November 1924 she performed the roles of Fricka and Brünnhilde in an English language production of Ring Cycle given at Carnegie Hall by George Blumenthal's English Grand Opera Company under conductor Ignatz Waghalter. In 1932 she performed the role of New Peace in the world premiere of Alberto Randegger's Via Pacis which was given in concert form at the The Town Hall with Beniamino Gigli as the Warrior, Pedro de Cordoba as the Seer, and Meeka Aldrich as The Seeker among other cast members. In 1939 she performed as Czipra in a production of the The Gypsy Baron at Philharmonic Auditorium in Los Angeles and the Curran Theatre in San Francisco with John Charles Thomas as Rudi.

== World War I and post-war concert career ==
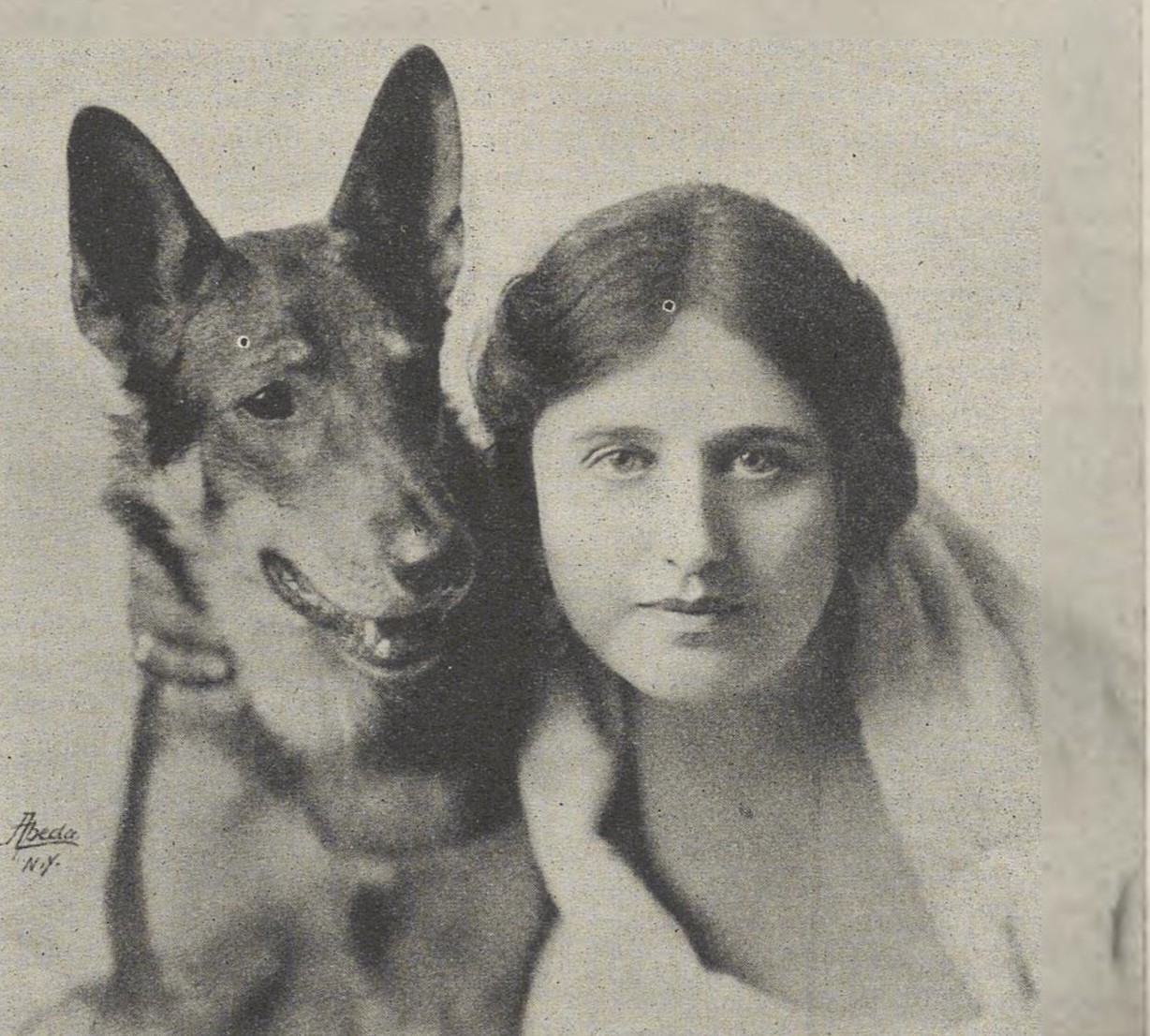
Mariska Aldrich with her dog Fels von Gesundbrunnen, in c. 1918

With the outbreak of World War I, Aldrich left Europe and returned to the United States. She brought home with her a German shepherd she had acquired in Germany named Fels von Gesundbrunnen. In 1919 Fels won a dog show sponsored by the German Shepherd Dog Club of America and became a world champion in "police dog" events involving tracking, scaling a 30-foot fence, and rescuing people from burning structures.

By the Fall of 1914 Aldrich had returned to New York and was teaching at Elsa Gregori's Gregorian Conservatory of Music and Art on Madison Avenue where she performed in a faculty recital in October of that year. In December 1914 she gave a concert of music by Paul Tietjens with the composer as her accompanist. In 1915 she was a headliner in vaudeville at the Majestic Theatre in Chicago (with Eddie Foy), the Majestic Theatre in Milwaukee, the Columbia Theater in St. Louis, the Orpheum Theatre in San Francisco, the Orpheum Theatre in Los Angeles, and the Orpheum Theatre in Memphis among other venues. She obtained a divorce from her first husband on October 21, 1915.

In March 1916 Aldrich gave a recital at the Princess Theatre in Manhattan in which she was billed as a mezzo-soprano. In May 1916 she performed at a Bastille Day event held at the Shrine Auditorium and Expo Hall in Los Angeles. Later that year she sang a concert of opera arias with the People's Philharmonic Orchestra led by Nikolai Sokoloff at the Cort Theatre in San Francisco. In September 1916 she performed for Queen Liliʻuokalani in Hawaii in a concert which included a new song, "Kuu Pua I Paoakalani", composed for the monarch.

In January 1917 Aldrich was a soloist in concerts with the Los Angeles Symphony led by Adolf Tandler. In July 1917 Aldrich performed at the Chautauqua Festival in Los Angeles with Charles Wakefield Cadman as her accompanist. In March 1917 she gave a recital at the Hotel Maryland in Pasadena. She married Los Angeles businessman and architect William Emmett Swindell Davis in Oakland, California, on April 26, 1917. This marriage also ended in divorce in 1926 after a suit was filed in 1925.

On Easter Day 1918 Aldrich sang at a special service held at the cross located at the summit of Mount Rubidoux. On Mother's Day 1918 she performed a concert with composer and pianist Carrie Jacobs-Bond for the soldiers stationed at Camp Kearny. She was a soloist in a choral concert conducted by Arthur Farwell at the University of California, Los Angeles in August 1918.

In June 1919 she gave a joint recital with the dancer Ted Shawn at the Columbia Theatre in San Francisco. By 1920 she was operating a private voice studio in Los Angeles. In February 1920 she performed in a vaudeville program with Will Rogers and Bebe Daniels at the Santa Fe Club in Los Angeles. In February 1921 she sang at a concert in New York organized by Emma Cecilia Thursby. In 1922 she was a soloist with the Los Angeles Philharmonic and conductor Alfred Hertz at the Hollywood Bowl singing a program of music by Richard Wagner and Ludwig van Beethoven, including the "Liebestod" from Tristan und Isolde.

On August 21, 1923, Aldrich sang a concert of Hungarian songs on American radio. She toured in vaudeville again in 1927, sharing top billing with Renée Adorée and Eva Tanguay. In 1928 she gave a recital at the Hotel Regis, and performed solos on WNYC radio in a concert that was connected to supporting women's organizations in New York. In 1931 she performed at the Radio World's Fair in New York which included a live television broadcast.

== Later career in theatre, television, and film ==
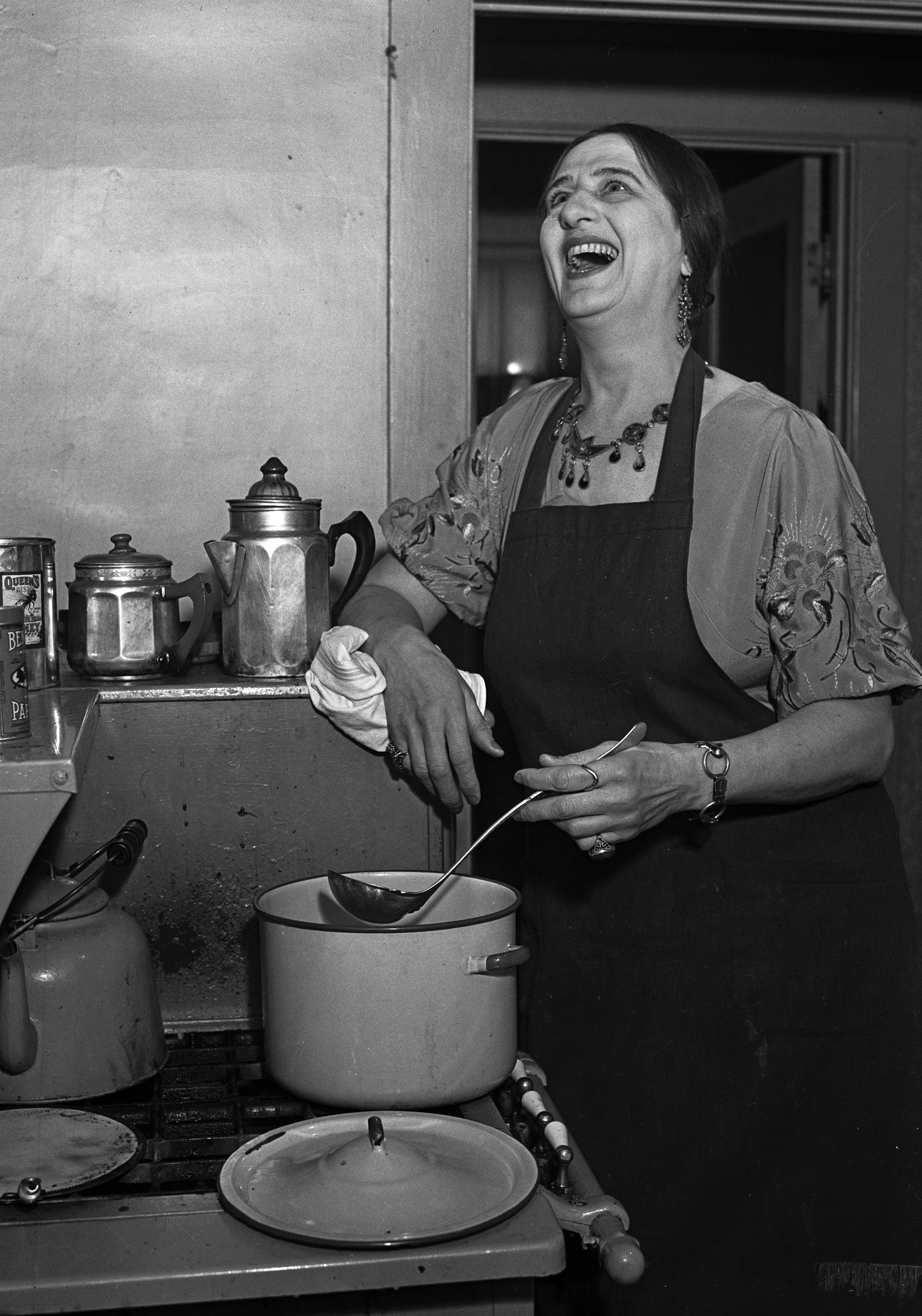
Mariska Aldrich cooking in 1935. She portrayed cooks in the films Love Begins at 20 and If You Could Only Cook.

In 1924 Aldrich portrayed the Abbess in the Broadway production of Karl Vollmöller's play The Miracle at the Century Theatre in which she achieved critical success. She later toured in this show in 1926-1927. In 1927 she was a replacement cast member as the mother superior in Eva Le Gallienne's staging of The Cradle Song at the Civic Repertory Theatre. In November 1930 she replaced Hope Emerson as Lampito in the Broadway revival of Aristophanes's Lysistrata at the 44th Street Theatre.

While working on the New York stage Aldrich was simultaneously employed as the manager of the women's department in the New York brokerage firm W. E. Hutton & Co. in the early 1930s. By 1931 she was working as a television host in New York at WGBS's W2XCR under Dailey Paskman. She also had her own radio program with WGBS. In 1933 she was back in Los Angeles performing at society events. She continued to perform periodically in regional theatre in California. In 1937 she portrayed Mrs. Blanche in Lloyd Chase's original musical Cocktail Bar at the Geary Theater in San Francisco.

Aldrich sang for the 1933 animated short film Old King Cole which was part of Walt Disney's Silly Symphony series. She appeared in many Hollywood films over the next thirteen years, often in bit parts with in-jokes that featured her background as a well-known opera singer. One such instance was in the musical comedy film Bottoms Up (1934) in which she appeared as a fan-magazine writer who unsuccessfully sings at a Hollywood event. In the musical Maytime she appears as a soloist in the mini-opera Czartiza which was created specifically for that film by composer Herbert Stothart. George Cukor cast her as a memorable voice teacher in his classic film The Women (1939).

Other films in which Aldrich was cast as an opera singer included Vagabond Lady (1935), Fatal Lady (1936), and Two Sisters from Boston (1946). Her height was also a factor in many of her small roles. She was cast as tall or large women in the films Under Your Spell (1936), The Cherokee Strip (1937), Madame Curie (1943), and The Hidden Eye (1945). In the 1941 murder mystery comedy Whistling in the Dark she portrayed the oversize grim housekeeper Hilda to whom Red Skelton (as Wally Benton) makes the crack "Aren't you wrestling somewhere tonight?"

Occasionally Aldrich got to appear in larger character actress roles in films, including Lucretia in Lady by Choice (1934), Mme. Ziffnidyiff in You're the One (1941), and Mabu in Song of the Sarong (1945). Her daughter Meeka was occasionally cast in roles alongside her mother.

== Later life and death ==
Aldrich continued to teach voice in Los Angeles in her later life. Some artists who studied with her included actress Ruth Gillette, tenor Richard Dennis, and baritone Robert Long. She died in Los Angeles on September 28, 1965, at the age of 84. She was cremated at Los Angeles County Crematory on October 6, 1965. Her ashes are interred at Forest Lawn in Hollywood Hills.

== Legacy ==
Mariska's daughter Meeka founded the Mariska Aldrich Foundation (MAF), a music library which used as its seed the many recordings, scores and other materials collected by her mother during her career. Meeka and her husband expanded the collection which was donated to the School of Music at the University of Utah after their deaths in 1998. Containing one of the largest collections of historical recordings in the United States, the Utah Festival Opera (UFO) sued for possession of the archive in 2000 at which time the collection was valued at over three million dollars. At the time the lawsuit was filed the UFO claimed that the archive had been promised to the UFO by the MAF's executive officers. The archive remains at the University of Utah as of 2026.

Mariska was the subject of a portrait titled Caprice, created by artist Henry Salem Hubbell in 1908. This painting was in the collection of the National Arts Club in New York and was the most publicized submission to the 1908 Paris Salon. Caprice is currently in the permanent collection of the Mulvane Art Museum in Topeka, Kansas as part of the Endangered Art series. Her portrait was also painted by Vera Stanley Alder.

== Filmography ==
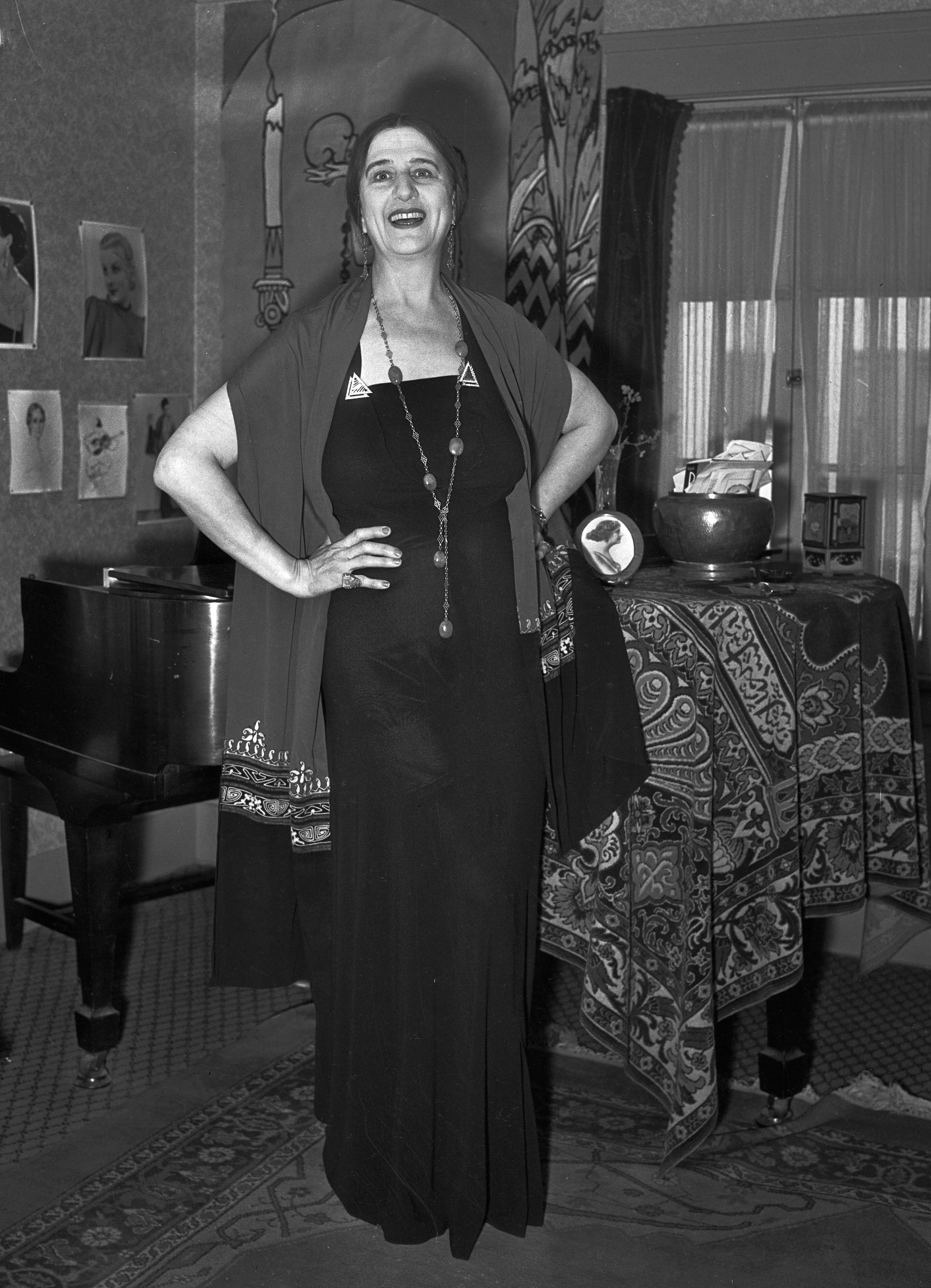
Mariska Aldrich, 1935

Year	Film	Role	Notes
1923	Souls for Sale	Uncredited role	
1933	Old King Cole	Singer	
1934	The Painted Veil	German Teacher	
1934	Lady by Choice	Lucretia	
1934	Bottoms Up	Opera Singer	
1934	Evelyn Prentice	Matron	
1935	Vagabond Lady	Wagnerian vocalist	
1935	Bad Boy	German Woman	
1935	If You Could Only Cook	Swedish Cook	
1936	One Rainy Afternoon	Uncredited role	
1936	Fatal Lady	Member of Brazilian Opera Troupe	
1936	Love Begins at 20	Cook	
1936	Camille	Friend of Camille	
1936	Under Your Spell	Tall Woman	
1937	That Man's Here Again	Mrs. Sampson	
1937	Rhythm in the Clouds	Madame Enitiba	
1937	Exclusive	Policewoman	
1937	The Cherokee Strip	Big Wife	
1937	Maytime	Opera singer	
1937	I'll Take Romance	Woman	
1937	Live, Love and Learn	Dowagers	
1937	The Emperor's Candlesticks	Ugly Woman	
1938	Paradise for Three	Beauty Operator	
1938	Bluebeard's Eighth Wife	Nurse	
1939	The Women	Singing Teacher	
1939	Tell No Tales	Reporter	
1939	Four Girls in White	Crazy Woman	
1939	Stronger Than Desire	Police Matron	
1940	Bar Buckaroos	Woman	
1940	Boobs in the Woods	Singing Customer	
1941	Whistling in the Dark	Hilda	
1941	You're the One	Mme. Ziffnidyiff	
1942	Ship Ahoy	Waldo's Mother	
1943	Madame Curie	Tall Woman	
1945	The Hidden Eye	Big Woman in Elevator	
1945	Song of the Sarong	Mabu	
1946	Two Sisters from Boston	Opera Singer	
