= George Pepper =

George Pepper may refer to:

- George Pepper (film producer) (1913–1969), American film producer, Hollywood organizer, child violin prodigy
- George W. Pepper (1867–1961), American lawyer, law professor, and Republican politician from Pennsylvania
- George H. Pepper (1873–1924), American ethnologist and archaeologist
- George Pepper (artist) (1903–1962), Canadian artist
- George Dana Boardman Pepper (1833–1913), American academic administrator
