= Edison, the Man =

1940 film by Clarence Brown

- Directed by: Clarence Brown
- Written by: Talbot Jennings; Bradbury Foote; Dore Schary; Hugo Butler
- Produced by: John W. Considine Jr.
- Starring: Spencer Tracy; Rita Johnson
- Cinematography: Harold Rosson
- Edited by: Fredrick Y. Smith
- Music by: Herbert Stothart
- Production company: Metro-Goldwyn-Mayer
- Distributed by: Loew's Inc.
- Release date: May 10, 1940
- Running time: 107 minutes
- Country: United States
- Language: English
- Budget: $893,000
- Box office: $1,787,000

Edison, the Man is a 1940 biographical film depicting the life of inventor Thomas Edison, who was portrayed by Spencer Tracy. Hugo Butler and Dore Schary were nominated for the Academy Award for Best Writing, Original Story for their work on this film. Typical of most Hollywood biopics, much of the film fictionalizes or exaggerates the real events of Edison's life.

Edison, the Man was the second of a complementary pair of Edison biopics released by Metro-Goldwyn-Mayer in 1940. Young Tom Edison, starring Mickey Rooney, was released two months earlier and told the story of Edison's youth.

== Plot ==
In 1869, anxious to be more than a tramp telegraph operator, Edison travels to New York at the prompting of an old friend, Bunt Cavatt. He goes to work for Bunt's uncle, Ben Els. He tries to persuade financier Mr. Taggart to fund the development of his inventions, but Taggart has no interest in financing "green electrical workers". However, General Powell, the president of Western Union, does.

Edison eventually sells his invention of an improved ticker tape machine to Taggart and Powell for $40,000, enabling him to get married and open his own laboratory at Menlo Park. In the next few years, he invents the phonograph with the help of his devoted staff.

Trouble arises when Bunt brags to reporters that Edison has perfected the electric light. Since he hasn't yet, he is condemned by the scientific community (encouraged by Taggart, whose gas stocks are threatened by the announcement). Edison "leaves science behind", and with a Herculean trial-and-error effort, finally succeeds in inventing a practical electric light. His subsequent plans to light New York City are again hindered by Taggart, who arranges it so that Edison is given only six months to complete the entire task. Nevertheless, Edison finishes the job just in time.

== Cast ==
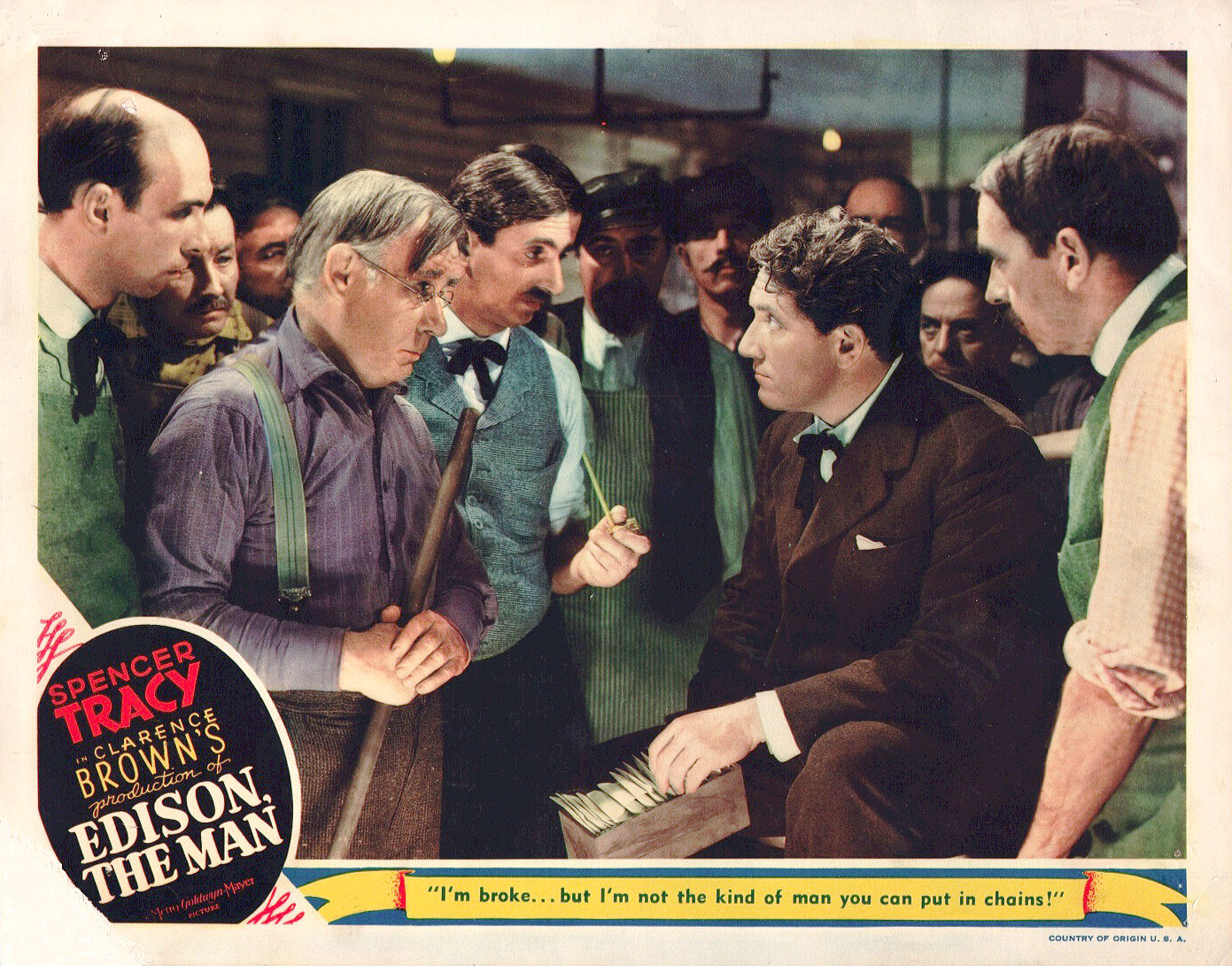
Lobby card for Edison, the Man (1940)

- Spencer Tracy as Thomas Alva Edison
- Rita Johnson as Mary Stillwell
- Charles Coburn as General Powell
- Gene Lockhart as Mr. Taggart
- Henry Travers as Ben Els
- Lynne Overman as James J. 'Bunt' Cavatt
- Felix Bressart as Michael Simon, Edison's assistant
- Gene Reynolds as Jimmy Price
- Byron Foulger as Edwin Hall
- Peter Godfrey as Bob Ashton
- Guy D'Ennery as Lundstrom
- Milton Parsons as 'Acid' Graham
- Addison Richards as Mr. Johnson
- Paul Hurst as Sheriff
- Philo McCullough as Assistant (uncredited)
- Charles Trowbridge as Clark (uncredited)

== Quotes ==
"I'm an inventor. I can't be told what to do. I've got to do the things I want to do. I work with ideas, visionary things. Nobody—not even I—knows how useful they're going to be or how profitable until I had a chance to work them out in my own way."

"You think you're nothing but wood and metal and glass. But you’re not: you're dreams and hard work and heart. You'd better not disappoint us."

"It's not the money wrapped up in the laboratory, it's the lives wrapped up in the laboratory. It's come to mean everything that I ever set out to do. It means a weekly paycheck for all my men. It means home, shelter, clothing, and food for lots of families."

"He hasn't got a darn thing but I like to hear him talk that way."

== Reception ==
Bosley Crowther of The New York Times praised Tracy's performance for bringing "human and vital substantiality" to the role, but criticized the film for its numerous historical inaccuracies: "When Metro deliberately distorts certain important details in Edison's career and boldly invents others—even though it were done with the sanction of his family—the question arises as to whether this creation is intended to be a reliable portrait of the great inventor or just another fellow who looks something like him. Frankly, we think it wiser to regard it in the second light." Variety called the film "a top-bracket picture from Metro that takes its place among the more important biographical contributions by the screen." Harrison's Reports wrote: "As in Young Tom Edison, this offers good entertainment for both young and old, in spite of the fact that the action is not particularly fast-moving. In a way it is even better than the first picture, for the older Edison is more interesting, and the work he accomplishes is far more exciting." Film Daily called it "one of the truly memorable pictures of the year" and predicted it would "command most serious consideration" when it came time to vote for the Academy Awards. John Mosher of The New Yorker wrote that even though the story of Edison's career was "not really screen material ... more than one might think, its interest mounts with the advance of the picture and some actual excitement is achieved at last."

== Box office ==
According to MGM records the film earned $1,152,000 in the US and Canada and $635,000 elsewhere resulting in a profit of $143,000.
