= George Pepper (film producer) =

American film producer

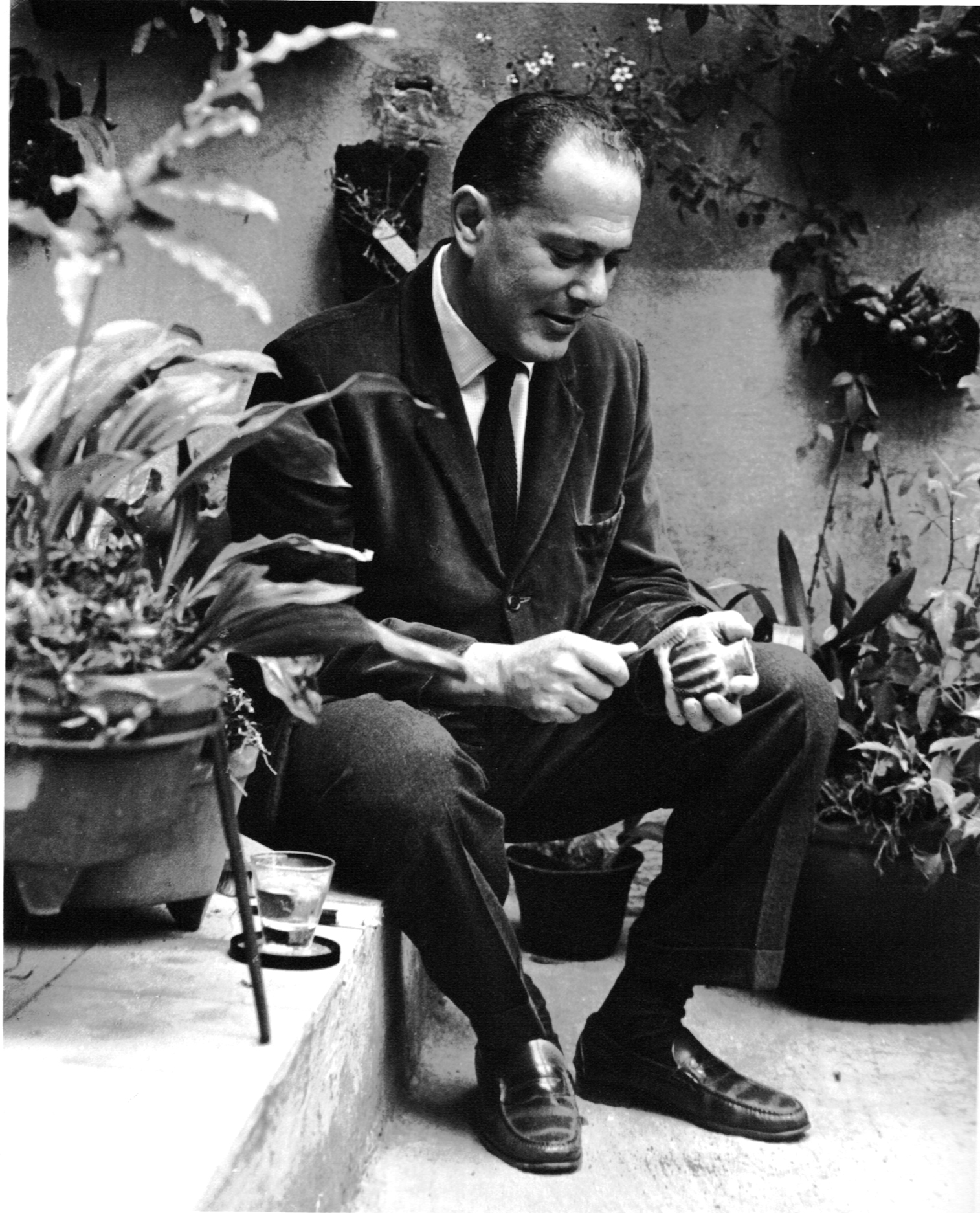
- Film Producer George Pepper, Gift of Cleo Trumbo
- Born: George Pepper; December 1, 1913 Pennsylvania, U.S.
- Died: December 14, 1969 (aged 56) Mexico City, Mexico
- Occupation: Producer and Hollywood Organizer
- Spouses: Joy Pepper ne.Darwin (1920-2017;) Jeanette Pepper (1918–2016;)
- Children: Margot Pepper

George Pepper (December 1, 1913 – December 14, 1969), known also as George P. Werker was a blacklisted Hollywood organizer and producer who collaborated with the Spanish film director Luis Buñuel and writer Hugo Butler.

== Early life ==
Son of William Pepper and Sophie Werker, George Pepper was a violin child prodigy making headlines for soloing with adult symphony orchestras.... At age four, along with his older brother Jack, he raised money to construct the Hollywood Bowl by playing the violin, and both boys' names were inscribed in the amphitheater's seats.

In 1925, at age 12, Pepper received a scholarship to the Curtis Institute of Music in Philadelphia to study with the violinist Carl Flesch. Later he continued his studies with Leopold Auer and Efrem Zimbalist, until his playing career was cut short by a repetitive stress nerve condition in his left hand at age 24.

== Career ==
=== Hollywood organizer ===
During the 1940s, Pepper became secretary of the Hollywood Democratic Committee and the Hollywood Independent Citizens Committee of the Arts, Sciences, and Professions (HICCASP). According to Larry Ceplair and Steven Englund's book The Inquisition in Hollywood, during Pepper's term as executive secretary, membership skyrocketed, and the HICCASP became "the major outpost of progressivism west of the Hudson River". Hollywood intellectuals and stars like Gene Kelly, Gregory Peck, Dalton Trumbo, and Orson Welles worked with the organization to improve the rights, conditions, and pay of industry workers across the country.

=== Blacklisting ===
HICCASP was targeted by the House Un-American Activities Committee (HUAC) during McCarthyism. Thousands of radical and progressive workers, including Pepper and his wife Jeanette, were blacklisted as "potential communists," which meant their termination or exclusion from their profession. On April 25, 1951, film director Edward Dmytryk appeared before HUAC as a friendly witness and named Pepper as a communist. Jeannette Pepper was subsequently named by writer Stanley Roberts on May 20, 1952.

=== Film producer ===
In Spring of 1951, George and Jeanette Pepper fled to Mexico to dodge a subpoena from the Tenney Committee, California's subcommittee of HUAC. In Mexico, Pepper created Producciones Olmec and met Spanish filmmaker Luis Buñuel. He introduced Buñuel to the blacklisted screenwriter Hugo Butler. Then, working under the alias George P. Werker, Pepper produced Butler's scripts for The Adventures of Robinson Crusoe (1954), Torero (1956), The Little Giants (1958), and The Young One (La joven, 1960)

=== Collector ===
Pepper also became one of the foremost authorities and collectors of Pre-Columbian artifacts, with his name displayed as donor of many important works in the National Museum of anthropology in Mexico City. In Mexico City, Pepper met Fred Vanderbilt Field and Nieves Orozco who introduced him to artist Miguel Covarrubias. Covarrubias traded some of his paintings and Balinese textiles for Pepper's pre-Columbian, and Pepper photographed the now disappeared Olmec Notebooks of Miguel Covarrubias

Pepper is survived by his daughter, author and educator Margot Eve Pepper and grandson, Rafael Pepper-Clarke, also a journalist, since age 7

== Selected filmography ==
- The Adventures of Robinson Crusoe (1954) directed by Luis Buñuel
- Torero! (1956), directed by Carlos Velo
- Los pequeños gigantes (1958), directed by Hugo Butler
- La joven (The Young One, 1960) directed by Luis Buñuel
