= Comrade X =

1940 film by King Vidor

- 1940 US Theatrical Poster
- Directed by: King Vidor
- Screenplay by: Ben Hecht; Charles Lederer; Herman J. Mankiewicz (uncredited)
- Story by: Walter Reisch
- Produced by: Gottfried Reinhardt; King Vidor
- Starring: Clark Gable; Hedy Lamarr; Oskar Homolka; Felix Bressart; Eve Arden; Natasha Lytess
- Cinematography: Joseph Ruttenberg
- Edited by: Harold F. Kress
- Music by: Bronislau Kaper
- Production company: Metro-Goldwyn-Mayer
- Distributed by: Loew's Inc.
- Release date: December 13, 1940 (U.S.)
- Running time: 90 minutes
- Country: United States
- Language: English
- Budget: $920,000
- Box office: $2 million

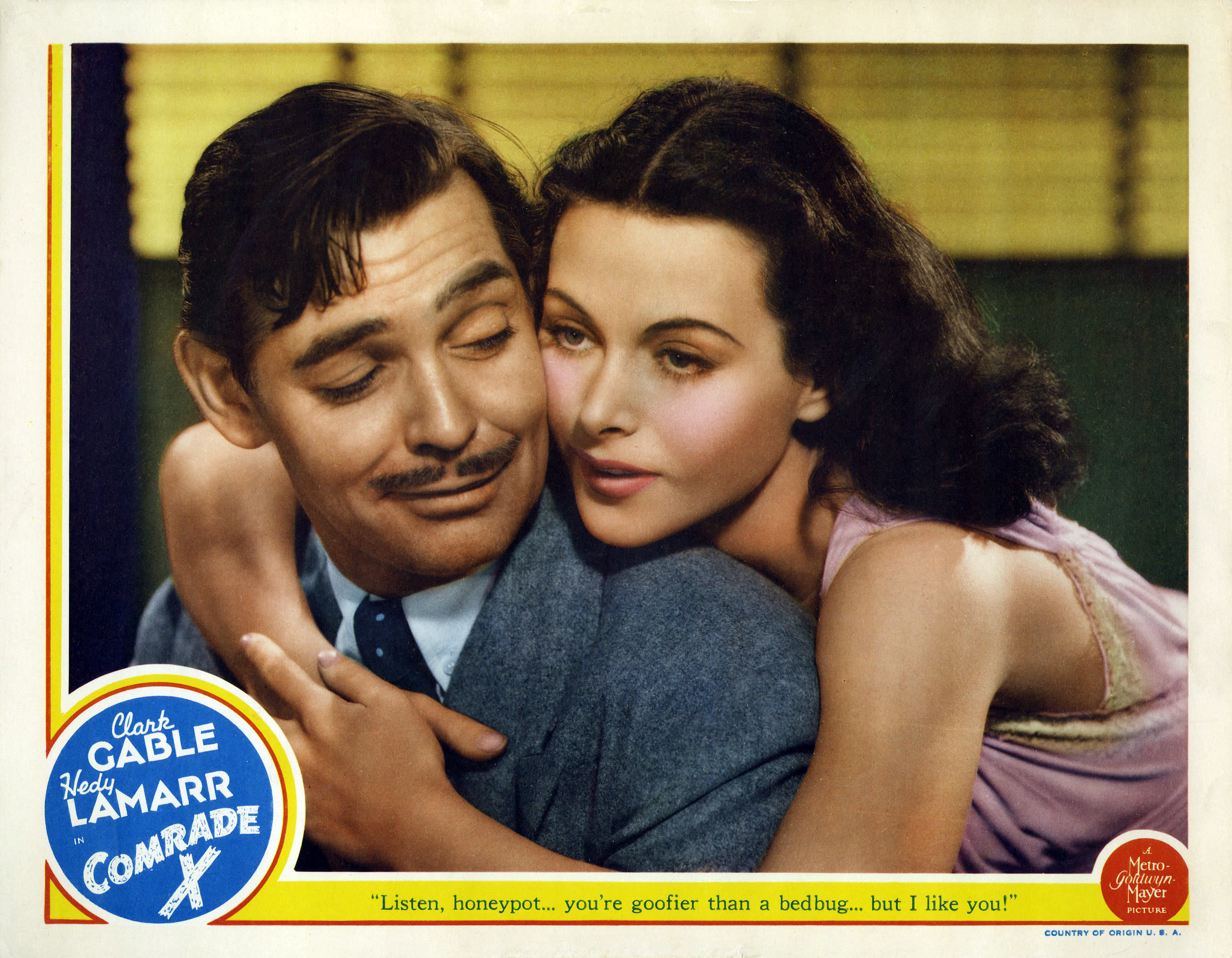
Lobby card with Gable and Lamarr

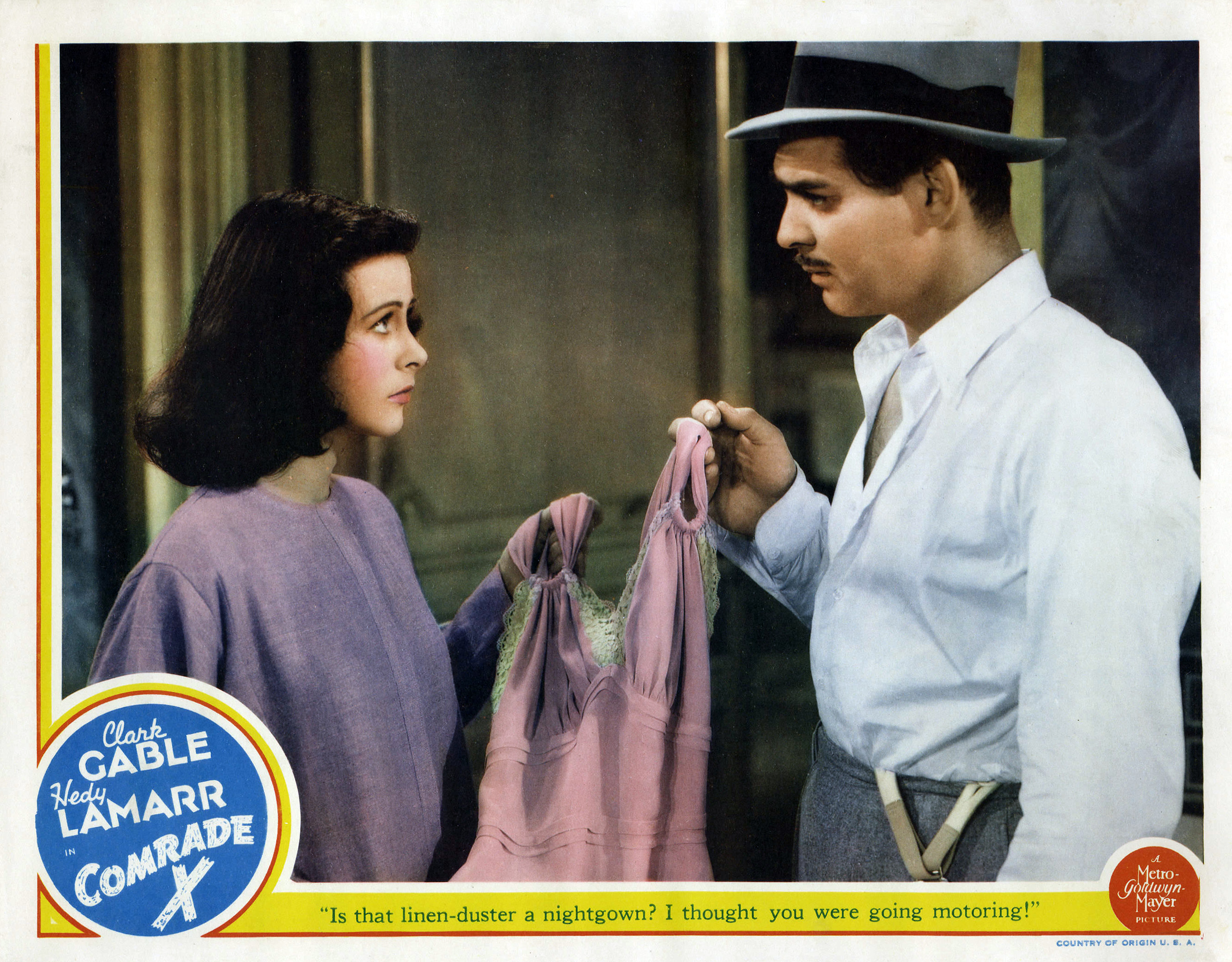
Lobby card with Lamarr and Gable

Comrade X is a 1940 American comedy spy film directed by King Vidor and starring Clark Gable and Hedy Lamarr. The supporting cast features Oskar Homolka, Felix Bressart, Sig Rumann and Eve Arden. In February 2020, the film was shown at the 70th Berlin International Film Festival, as part of a retrospective dedicated to King Vidor's career.

== Plot ==
In 1940, foreign reporter "Comrade X" is bypassing censors and sending out critical stories about the Soviet Union. Commissar Vasiliev, chief of the secret police, announces that he has taken over the censorship of the press. His predecessor, Comrade Molkov, who was "not watching his step" has been the victim of a "traffic accident." All reporters are restricted, unable to leave Moscow without permits. McKinley "Mac" Thompson, secretly "Comrade X", pretends to be an irresponsible alcoholic who skips the news conference.

German reporter Van Hofer has taken over Mac's room, which Mac has paid for in advance and "fixed up." "Is this a nice way for a Nazi to act?" Mac asks Van Hofer. Reporter Jane Wilson informs Mac that the funeral will be held that day of Comrade Molkov, shot by his old pal, Commissar Vasiliev, who will now cry over Molkov's grave. Mac pretends to care only about the reception, and Jane expresses disappointment that he was once "the best reporter in the business." Van Hofer arrives with the Russian hotel manager, complaining that the American has invaded his space. The conversation is interrupted by a phone call, which Mac pretends is the American news bureau notifying that Germany has declared war on Russia (ironically, scripted months before Germany's actual 1941 invasion of Russia). The indignant Russian manager kicks the German Van Hofer out of the room.

At Molkov's funeral, Mac spots a pallbearer signal by knocking on the coffin. Using a camera disguised as a portable radio, Mac takes a photo as the assassin rises out of the coffin to shoot at Commissar Vasiliev. Mac hides the film.

Mac's identity is discovered by his valet, Vanya, who blackmails him into promising to get his daughter, Golubka, out of the country. Golubka, a streetcar conductor, is called "Theodore" because only men are allowed to drive streetcars. Theodore is an idealistic communist, which Mac and Jane proclaim "the worst thing you can be in the Soviet Union." Communists are full of ideals dangerous to authorities, thus the Communists are executed so Communism can succeed.

Riding Theodore's streetcar, Mac pretends to admire the Soviet Union and expresses a wish to help her spread communist ideals in the US. Although initially suspicious of Mac's motives, with her mentor Bastakoff's blessing (eager to get rid of a pesky fanatical idealist), Theodore agrees to a sham marriage so she can spread the virtues of Communism to the rest of the world. Unable to marry as "Theodore," she now takes the name of "Lizvanetchka" (Lizzie), a revolutionary martyr. On their wedding night, Lizzie shows Mac a photo of her idol, Bastakoff, whom Mac recognizes as Vasiliev's attempted assassin. Jane arrives to ask Mac to file a story for her in the US, exposing Mac as anti-Soviet to Lizzie. After Jane leaves, the secret police arrive to take Mac and Lizzie for questioning by Commissar Vasiliev.

Awaiting Vasiliev, Mac pretends not to recognize his own radio-camera, found in Vanya's room. To protect Mac and Lizzie, Vanya claims he is Comrade X, showing how cutouts in "his" handkerchief can be used to decipher messages. Mac, Lizzie, and Vanya are arrested. A group of Bastakoff's followers are imprisoned with them, and Lizzie proclaims they would all rather die than betray Bastakoff. Mac relays a proposition to Vasiliev via a guard. He will tell Vasiliev the identity of the man who tried to assassinate him and provide a photograph of the attempt.

When Mac is escorted to "Vasiliev", he finds Bastakoff is now chief of police. Vasiliev has died of "pneumonia." The photograph is embarrassing to Bastakoff―as are the 100 Bastakoff followers executed at Bastakoff's orders to prove his loyalty to the new government. Mac gives Bastakoff the incriminating photo but withholds the negative. Bastakoff exchanges the lives of Lizzie, Vanya, and Mac for the negative, which Mac is to retrieve.

Knowing Bastakoff will not keep his word―Lizzie now disillusioned―they evade the secret police trailing them, and the three hide on a train hauling tanks. Appropriating a tank, which Lizzie has been trained to drive, they cross the border into Romania (the Romanian army flees in terror from the "invasion"), where they surrender and successfully reach the US.

== Cast ==
- Clark Gable as McKinley B. "Mac" Thompson
- Hedy Lamarr as Golubka / Theodore Yahupitz / Lizvanetchka "Lizzie"
- Oskar Homolka as Commissar Vasiliev
- Felix Bressart as Igor Yahupitz / Vanya
- Eve Arden as Jane Wilson
- Sig Rumann as Emil Von Hofer
- Natasha Lytess as Olga Milanava
- Vladimir Sokoloff as Michael Bastakoff
- Edgar Barrier as Rubick, Commissar's Aide
- Georges Renavent as Laszlo, world press attendee (credited as George Renevant)
- Mikhail Rasumny as arresting Russian Officer

== Production ==
Production on Comrade X began filming in late August 1940. Vidor cast Lamarr against type; her previous films emphasizing her sexuality. Vidor, instead, wrapped her in man's clothing and gave her a rough, masculine demeanor. Gable was not Vidor's first choice for lead actor, but Robert Montgomery turned down the part in 1939, going overseas to help the British with the war effort. Leveraging their successful pairing in Boomtown, he instead teamed Gable with Lamarr, a casting decision that proved popluar with critics and moviegoers alike.

Unusual for Vidor, Comrade X was filmed almost exclusively on set: hotel rooms, offices, and a jail cell. Near the movie's conclusion, he finally ventures outside for the madcap escape in a tank, but even then, much of the action takes place in the confines of the tank's crew compartment. Lamarr and Gable's tank was constructed by Hollywood technicians and carpenters and the two stars "spent eight jarring days in it, galloping merrily over a special course on the studio's back ninety acres."

Gable prophetically jokes that "Germany just invaded Russia" and "Panzer tanks are rolling into Ukraine" to get the Russian hotel manager to kick the German reporter out of his room. Less than a year after release, Germany did indeed invade Russia and the Ukrainian SSR.

At one point in the movie, after McKinley feeds vodka to his secretary Olga and embraces her, Golubka enters his room and the women engage in a "hair pulling battle" for his affections that Variety described as “a honey."

== Box office ==
According to MGM records the film earned $1,520,000 in the US and Canada and $559,000 elsewhere resulting in a profit of $484,000.

== Reception ==
Critics, at the time of the film's release, provided mostly positive reviews, the comical chase of tanks in the movie’s penultimate scene, as McKinley and Golubka escape their communist pursuers, being frequently cited as one of the film’s comedic highlights, one reviewer predicting viewers will "laugh themselves sick" at the scene.

Many critics, such as the The New York Times's Bosley Crowther mentioned the satirizing of the Soviet Union’s oppressive regime as being in-step with Hollywood’s anti-communist attitude. “For seldom has a film – with the exception of Chalie Chaplin’s “The Great Dictator” - satirized a nation’s political system with such grim and malicious delight as does this Yuletide comedy, in which Clark Gable and Hedy Lamarr are the chief conspirators.” – Crowther

Critics were pleasantly surprised watching Hedy Lamarr perform in a comedic role. Until Comrade X she had been exclusively cast in dramatic roles, often emphasizing her sultry appearance and personality. One reviewer praised her “free-for-all” scene where she takes on Natasha Lytess in a face slapping and hair pulling match and then after defeating her, attacks Gable, biting and kicking him in response to seeing him and Lytess embrace. “These gal fights have become more and more popular since Marlene Dietrich created such a sensation in her barroom brawl in Destry Rides Again.”

The film's story, written by Walter Reisch, was nominated for an Academy Award.

==== Hollywood's changing characterization of the Soviet Union ====
"Not only was Comrade X the most blatant anti-Russian film ever made during this period, it was also the last. Released in 1940, just a few months after the success oí Ninotchka, it was quietly pulled out of general circulation in June 1941 after Hitler's eastern invasion. Quickly edited, with new material added to soften the initial blow, Comrade X reappeared with an introductory trailer explaining that the film was harmless fun between two good friends, two super-powers, who were now allies in a war for survival."

Following the Russian Revolution, Hollywood's depiction of the Soviet Union was uniformly negative. Productions such as A Sammy in Siberia, and Mockery were typical of the anti-Soviet themes pervading the film industry. With the beginning of sound motion pictures, the anti-Soviet theme continued at an even higher tempo, the most famous being 1939’s Ninotchka, where dedicated communist Great Garbo is turned into a freedom-loving capitalist through the good efforts of Melvyn Douglas. Like other pre-war American films, Ninotchka depicted the Soviet Union as backwards, dreary, depressing and totalitarian. Comrade X continued Hollywood’s negative portrayal of the Soviet Union. Although it was a screwball comedy, it skewered the both the ineptness as well as the savagery of the communist system, the latter driven home when McKinley and Golubka witness the execution of Russian peasants on false counter-revolutionary charges.

After the United States entered World War II on the same side of the Soviet Union, Hollywood's depiction of Russians immediately changed from barbaric totalitarians to brave, honorable, freedom-loving liberators. Not surprisingly, the film industry followed Comrade X with pro-Soviet films, among them Miss V from Moscow, starring Lola Lane as a Soviet spy in Paris, risking her life to help the allies against Nazi Germany; The North Star starring Anne Baxter and Dana Andrews, and the unabashedly pro-Soviet propaganda film The Boy from Stalingrad.

Not wanting to offend new-found allies, after Germany invaded the Soviet Union, the UK pulled Comrade X from the cinemas. Elsewhere, screenings were prefaced by a trailer that explained away the tension in the movie by saying the film was "Please don't take this film seriously -- it is just good natured fun. We certainly don't mean it as a realistic picture of the Soviet Union today or of the Soviet people whose brave stand against Nazi oppression we all applaud."
