= Natasha Lytess =

American acting coach (1913–1963)

- Born: Natalia Postmann; May 16, 1911; Berlin, Germany
- Died: May 12, 1963 (aged 51); Zurich, Switzerland
- Occupations: Actress; coach

Natasha Lytess (16 May 1911 – 12 May 1963) was an actress, writer and drama coach.

== Life ==
Born Natalia Postmann and also known as Liesl Massary and Tala Forman, she had studied with the director Max Reinhardt and appeared in the repertory theater. She is said to have had a relationship with the writer Leonhard Frank, who is also said to be the father of her daughter Barbara, born in 1943.

When the Nazis came to power, and in light of her Jewish heritage, she moved to the United States and settled in Los Angeles. She had hoped for a great stage career, but her accent and purportedly unfeminine appearance limited the roles she could play.

Among her acting credits were appearances in Comrade X (1940), Once Upon a Honeymoon (1942), and The House on Telegraph Hill (1951). Her performance in Once Upon a Honeymoon drew praise from New York Times critic Bosley Crowther, who said she "shines with clear and poignant brilliance in a brief part as a Jewish chambermaid."

In her career as a drama coach, her students included Mamie Van Doren, Virginia Leith, and Ann Savage (who reputedly got her stage name after a particularly "savage" argument with Lytess).

Lytess is best known for her partnership with actress Marilyn Monroe from 1948 to 1956. During her time as a drama coach for Columbia Pictures, Lytess was shown Monroe's screen test and convinced Harry Cohn to hire Monroe for a six-month contract. Lytess appeared on What's My Line on September 12, 1954 as Marilyn Monroe's dramatic coach. Her occupation was guessed by Bennett Cerf in the free guess given the panel before the game began because he recognized her face. Lytess coached Marilyn through more than 20 films before their partnership began to deteriorate. Lytess is rumored to have had more than professional feelings toward Monroe which developed, according to Monroe and other actresses that studied under Lytess, into an overbearing obsession. In 1956, Monroe sent Lytess a telegram saying that she did not require Natasha's services anymore, and the partnership ended after more than seven years.

== Death ==
Lytess died of cancer in 1963. She was portrayed by Viveca Lindfors in Marilyn: The Untold Story, Lindsay Crouse in Norma Jean & Marilyn, and by Embeth Davidtz in The Secret Life of Marilyn Monroe.

== Filmography ==
Year	Title	Role	Notes
1940	Comrade X	Olga	
1942	Once Upon a Honeymoon	Anna	
1951	The House on Telegraph Hill	Karin Dernakova	
1952	Anything Can Happen	Madame Greshiani	
1958	Schlitz Playhouse	Mother	episode: "Curfew at Midnight"
1961	Barabbas		uncredited

== Bibliography ==
- Spoto, Donald (2001). Marilyn Monroe: The Biography. Cooper Square Press. ISBN 978-0-8154-1183-3.
