= Young Tom Edison =

1940 film by Norman Taurog

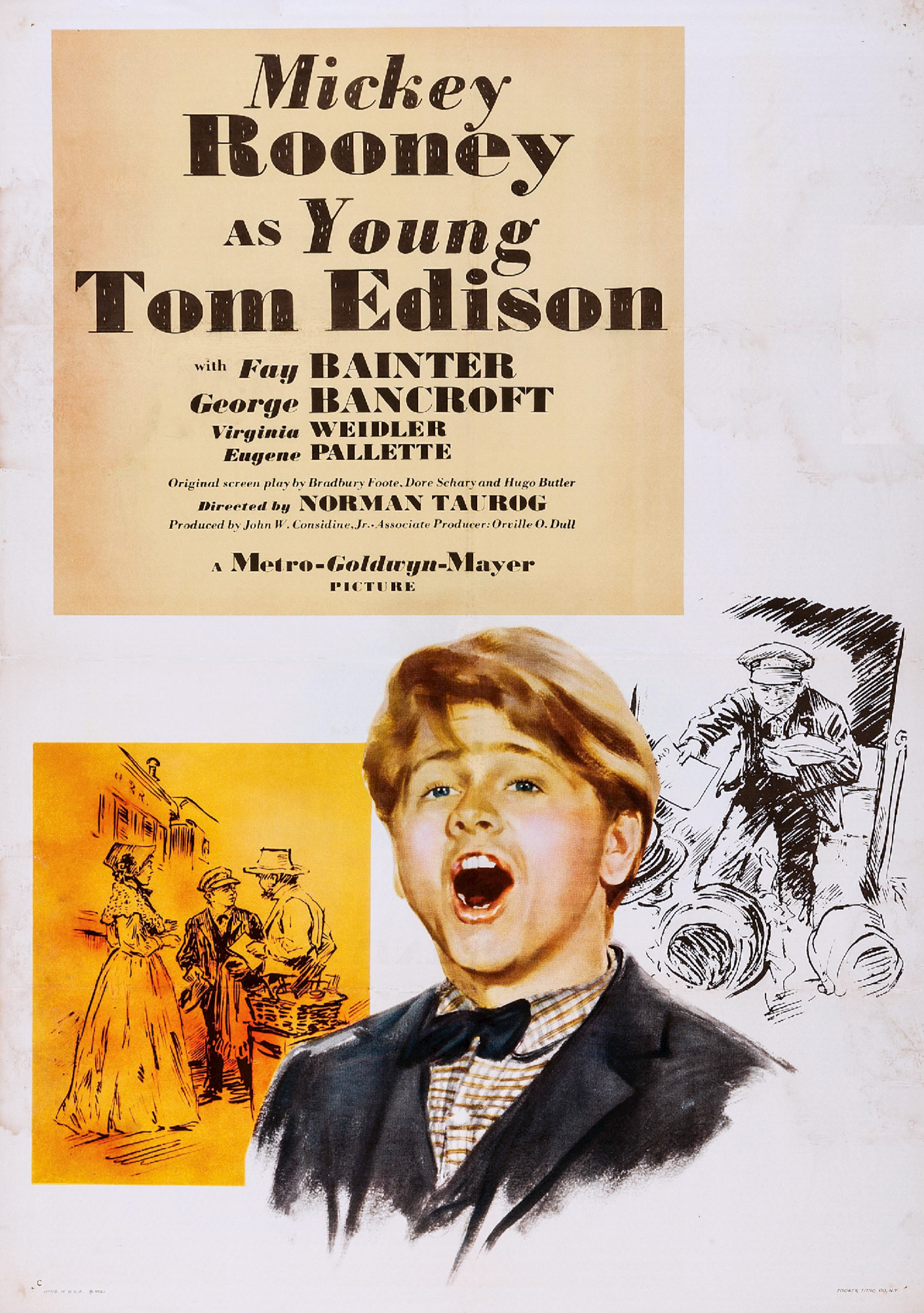
- Theatrical release poster
- Directed by: Norman Taurog
- Written by: H. Alan Dunn
- Screenplay by: Hugo Butler; Bradbury Foote; Dore Schary; Jack Mintz
- Produced by: John W. Considine Jr.
- Starring: Mickey Rooney; Fay Bainter; George Bancroft
- Cinematography: Sidney Wagner
- Edited by: Elmo Veron
- Music by: Edward Ward
- Production company: Metro-Goldwyn-Mayer
- Distributed by: Loew's Inc.
- Release date: February 10, 1940
- Running time: 86 minutes
- Country: United States
- Language: English

Young Tom Edison is a 1940 American biographical film about the early life of inventor Thomas Edison directed by Norman Taurog and starring Mickey Rooney. The film was the first of a complementary pair of Edison biopics that Metro-Goldwyn-Mayer released in 1940. Edison, the Man, starring Spencer Tracy, followed two months later, completing the two-part story of Edison's life.

== Plot ==
An imaginative, curious—and clumsy—boy Tom continually gets into mischief and causes accidents with his inventions and experiments. The townspeople regard him as a troublemaker and figure of fun. The schoolmistress expels him for daydreaming, distracting the other students and asking ridiculous questions. She suggests that his father take him to a doctor because he is “addled”. Tom's family loves him, although his father is frustrated and sometimes angered by Tom's thoughtless and costly misadventures. His mother sees the potential in Tom's unusual way of thinking. Tom's younger sister, Tannie, is his partner in adventures—they communicate by Morse Code. Tom starts a business peddling food and snacks on board trains, and Tannie helps him. Meanwhile, still banned from school, Tom reads everything he can about science. When the Civil War starts, Tom sets up a printing press in the baggage car, giving passengers the latest news.

Eager to help the Army, Tom takes a bottle of nitroglycerin on board a train, causing a panic. An accidental fire in the baggage car ends Tom's business for good, and when the conductor boxes his ears, his hearing is damaged. His father forbids him to keep chemicals in the house because he cannot be trusted. His attempts to get a job are met with ridicule. Tom, now 16, runs away to Detroit. The audience has seen Tom's mother wincing in pain, now she collapses in agony. Tannie finds Tom at the station and sends him home while she goes to fetch their older brother in a nearby town .

The doctor cannot operate by lamplight. Waiting 10 hours until daylight may take too long. In a stroke of inspiration, Tom breaks into the general store and takes a huge mirror. At home, he arrays multiple lamps in front of the mirror, which magnifies the light, focusing it on the dining room table. The astonished doctor operates on Tom's mother. When Tom returns the mirror, the store owner strikes Tom, smashing the mirror. Tom's father pulls up and refuses to hear Tom's side. He finds Nancy recovering at home.

As Tom walks home, the news comes that the railroad bridge is out and the telegraph wires are down. Tom proves he can send Morse Code using the whistle on the engine in the station. Tannie is in the oncoming train. She hears her call letters and the danger message, but the conductor ignores her until she says the bridge is out. The train stops just in time. Tom and Tannie are heroes. Tom's proud father meets him at the train. The film ends with the town seeing Tom off to take a job as a telegraph operator with the Grand Trunk Railroad.

A postscript cuts to a large oil portrait of Edison. A voice-over praises him and promotes Edison the Man as the shot expands to include Spencer Tracy, gazing at the painting.

== Cast ==
- Mickey Rooney as Thomas Edison
- Fay Bainter as Nancy Edison
- George Bancroft as Samuel Edison
- Virginia Weidler as Tannie Edison
- Eugene Pallette as Mr. Nelson
- Victor Kilian as Mr. Dingle
- Bobby Jordan as Joe Dingle
- J. M. Kerrigan as Mr. McCarney
- Lloyd Corrigan as Dr. Pender
- John Kellogg as Bill Edison
- Clem Bevans as Mr. Waddell
- Eily Malyon as School Teacher
- Harry Shannon as Captain Brackett
- Stanley Blystone as Army Officer (uncredited)
- Olin Howland as Telegrapher (uncredited)
- Mitchell Lewis as McGuire (uncredited)
- Spencer Tracy as Man Admiring Portrait of Thomas Edison (uncredited)

== Production ==
The railroad scenes were filmed on the Sierra Railroad in Tuolumne County, California.

== Release ==
The film had its world premiere on February 10, 1940, in Port Huron, Michigan, the place where Thomas Edison spent his childhood.

== Reception ==
Upon the film's release Rooney had his picture on the cover of the March 18, 1940 issue of Time. An accompanying article called Rooney "a rope-haired, kazoo-voiced kid with a comic-strip face, who until this week had never appeared in a picture without mugging or overacting it." The magazine said the film featured Rooney's "most sober and restrained performance to date, [of someone] who (like himself) began at the bottom of the American heap, (like himself) had to struggle, (like himself) won, but a boy whose main activity (unlike Mickey's) was investigating, inventing, thinking."

Frank S. Nugent of The New York Times wrote: "Mr. Rooney's portrait defers to its subject only to the extent of being a trifle less Rooneyish than his Andy Hardy, the implication being that, if young Tom Edison was not Mickey Rooneyish, the fault was with Edison, not M. Rooney. And, for all we know, that may be the wisest attitude to take ... One thing is clear: Spencer Tracy as Edison the Man has a tough assignment ahead." A review in Variety called it "one of the finest biographies, from entertainment standpoint, ever filmed," and complimented Rooney for playing down his "past thespic effervescence." Harrison's Reports wrote: "Here is a picture that should prove not only inspiring to the youth of the country but vastly entertaining to both young and old." Film Daily wrote: "Mickey does fine work in the title role and demonstrates he can handle serious, dramatic moments as well as he does his popular comedy roles." John Mosher of The New Yorker called the film "a particularly routine piece" but "a pleasant, innocent item, on the wholesome side, and to be admired, we older types can only hope, by the young element."
