= Married Bachelor =

1941 film by Edward Buzzell

- Directed by: Edward Buzzell
- Written by: Manuel Seff
- Screenplay by: Dore Schary
- Produced by: John W. Considine Jr.
- Starring: Robert Young; Ruth Hussey; Felix Bressart
- Cinematography: George J. Folsey
- Edited by: Ben Lewis
- Music by: Lennie Hayton
- Production company: Metro-Goldwyn-Mayer
- Distributed by: Loew's Inc.
- Release date: October 16, 1941
- Running time: 81 minutes
- Country: United States
- Language: English

Married Bachelor is a 1941 American screwball comedy film directed by Edward Buzzell and starring Robert Young, Ruth Hussey and Felix Bressart. It was produced by Hollywood studio Metro-Goldwyn-Mayer with a screenplay written by future studio head Dore Schary.

== Synopsis ==
In order to settle a gambling debt a happily married man agrees to pose as a bachelor and claim credit for a new book about the playboy lifestyle which has in fact been written by an eccentric professor. He soon begins to get to wrapped up in his newfound role to the irritation of his wife, who is courted by the publisher of the book who does not realize she is married.

== Cast ==
- Robert Young as Randolph 'Randy' Haven
- Ruth Hussey as Norma Haven, aka Norma Winters
- Felix Bressart as Prof. Ladislaus Milic
- Lee Bowman as Eric Santley
- Sheldon Leonard as Johnny Branigan
- Sam Levene as Cookie Farrar
- Murray Alper as Sleeper
- Roy Gordon as Hudkins
- Hillary Brooke as Hillary Gordon
- Gladys Blake as Marie
- Frances Carson as Mrs. Harriet Heflan
- Charlotte Wynters as Margaret Johns
- Barbara Bedford as Juror at Radio Broadcast
- Inez Cooper as Glove Customer

== Bibliography ==
- Fetrow, Alan G. Feature Films, 1940-1949: a United States Filmography. McFarland, 1994.
- Milberg, Doris. The Art of the Screwball Comedy: Madcap Entertainment from the 1930s to Today. McFarland, 2013.
