= Song of the Sarong =

1945 film by Harold Young

- Directed by: Harold Young
- Written by: Gene Lewis
- Produced by: Gene Lewis
- Starring: Nancy Kelly; William Gargan
- Cinematography: Maury Gertsman
- Edited by: Fred R. Feitshans Jr.
- Music by: Edward Ward
- Distributed by: Universal Pictures
- Release date: April 1, 1945
- Running time: 65 minutes
- Language: English

Song of the Sarong (1945) is a musical film starring Nancy Kelly and William Gargan. The film was written by Gene Lewis and directed by Harold Young.

== Plot ==
There are valuable pearls worth millions of dollars being guarded by a formidable tribe of natives on the island of Kashira in the South Seas. Adventurer Drew Allen, who was once stranded on Kashira accepts an offer to recover the pearls. A thunderstorm, emergency landing, stowaways, and a confrontation with the natives complicate things. Trials and tribulations result in an island being converted to Christianity.

== Cast ==
- Nancy Kelly .... Sharon
- William Gargan .... Drew
- Eddie Quillan .... Tony
- Fuzzy Knight .... Pete
- George Dolenz .... Kalo
- George Cleveland .... Reemis
- Mariska Aldrich .... Mabu
- Morgan Wallace .... Adams
- Larry Keating .... Potter
- Robert Barron .... Jolo (as Bob Barron)
- Pete G. Katchenaro .... Servant
- Jack Slattery .... Announcer
- Jay Silverheels .... Spearman (as Silverheels Smith)
- Al Kikume .... Guard
- George Bruggeman .... Native
- Clarence Lung .... Leader
- William Desmond.... Councillor
- Jack Curtis .... Councillor
