= Three Hearts for Julia =

1943 film by Richard Thorpe

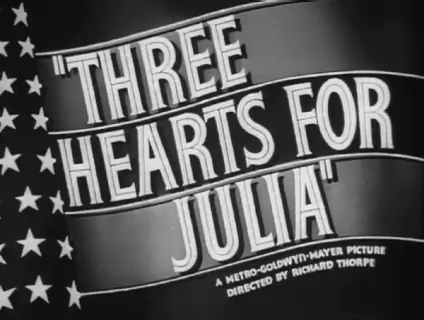
- Directed by: Richard Thorpe
- Screenplay by: Lionel Houser
- Story by: Lionel Houser
- Produced by: John W. Considine Jr.
- Starring: Ann Sothern; Melvyn Douglas
- Cinematography: George J. Folsey
- Edited by: Irvine Warburton
- Music by: Herbert Stothart
- Distributed by: Metro-Goldwyn-Mayer
- Release date: May 21, 1943 (United States)
- Running time: 83 minutes
- Country: United States
- Language: English

Three Hearts for Julia is a 1943 American romantic comedy film starring Ann Sothern and Melvyn Douglas. Directed by Richard Thorpe, the picture was distributed by Metro-Goldwyn-Mayer.

== Plot ==
American foreign correspondent Jeff Seabrook's prolonged absences are frustrating his former musician wife Julia so much she has resumed her performing career and is planning a divorce. Jeff hasn't told her he is on his way home. Julia hasn't told him she is leaving him and is already being deeply wooed by both by orchestra manager David Torrance and music critic Philip Barrows.

Jeff's newspaper editor John Girard advises him to act as if his wife’s complaints about him and their relationship are valid, claiming that’s what he does with his own, and it works out fine. Julia tries to concentrate on her music, playing lead violin in an all-female orchestra created to provide public entertainment in spite of a wartime era manpower shortage. At home, she serves as a den mother to a gaggle of younger women string players who inhabit every bedroom, couch, and day bed in the Seabrooks’ large home.

Both Jeff and John are served divorce papers by their respective wives. Julia’s decree is granted, and Jeff moves out.

Although temporarily off-duty from his job, he is suddenly called up for active military service. He keeps it to himself.

Desperate to reconcile, he drags Julia off to a remote cabin, attempting to compel her to think about her decision and angering her suitors.

His new plan works. The two rivals bicker with one another and reveal unattractive sides to Julia, who takes her patriotic ex-husband back at the last moment before he ships out.

== Cast ==
- Ann Sothern as Julia Seabrook
- Melvyn Douglas as Jeff Seabrook
- Lee Bowman as David Torrance
- Richard Ainley as Philip Barrows
- Felix Bressart as Anton Ottoway
- Marta Linden as May Elton
- Reginald Owen as John Girard
- Marietta Canty as Mattie
