= John W. Considine Jr. =

American film producer

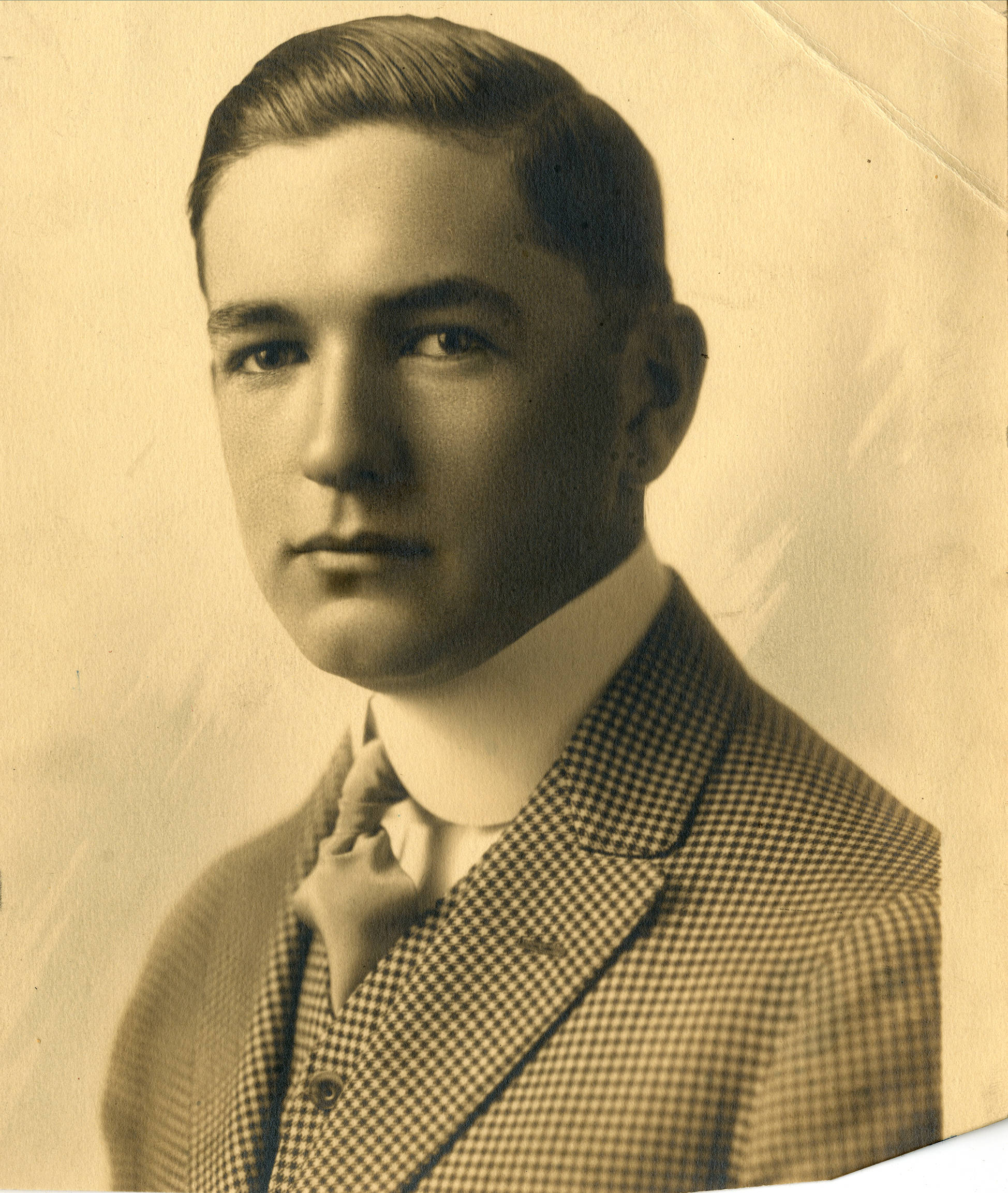
- Considine in 1916
- Born: October 7, 1898; Spokane, Washington, U.S.
- Died: March 22, 1961 (aged 62); Hollywood, California, U.S.
- Occupation: Producer
- Years active: 1925–1943 (film)

John W. Considine Jr. (October 7, 1898 – March 22, 1961) was an American film producer.

He joined MGM from Fox in 1932 and remained with the company for the rest of his career. That year he also directed his only film Disorderly Conduct.

He was born in Spokane, Washington the son of Elizabeth Ann (Donnelan) and impresario John Considine. He married Carmen Pantages (daughter of theater magnate Alexander Pantages) and was the father of actor Tim Considine and writer and actor John Considine. Considine and Pantages were married on Valentine's Day 1932. They divorced in 1952.

== Filmography ==
- Wild Justice (1925)
- The Eagle (1925)
- The Son of the Sheik (1926)
- Two Arabian Knights (1927)
- Tempest (1928)
- The Garden of Eden (1928)
- Eternal Love (1929)
- New York Nights (1929)
- One Romantic Night (1930)
- Puttin' On the Ritz (1930)
- Abraham Lincoln (1930)
- Be Yourself! (1930)
- The Bad One (1930)
- Don't Bet on Women (1931)
- Doctors' Wives (1931)
- Six Cylinder Love (1931)
- Skyline (1931)
- Always Goodbye (1931)
- She Wanted a Millionaire (1932)
- Flesh (1932)
- Disorderly Conduct (1932)
- Peg o' My Heart (1933)
- Dancing Lady (1933)
- This Side of Heaven (1934)
- Sequoia (1934)
- Evelyn Prentice (1934)
- Have a Heart (1934)
- The Gay Bride (1934)
- Mad Love (1935)
- Broadway Melody of 1936 (1935)
- Three Live Ghosts (1936)
- Absolute Quiet (1936)
- Robin Hood of El Dorado (1936)
- The Voice of Bugle Ann (1936)
- Personal Property (1937)
- The Emperor's Candlesticks (1937)
- Boys Town (1938)
- Arsène Lupin Returns (1938)
- Of Human Hearts (1938)
- Hold That Kiss (1938)
- Blackmail (1939)
- Society Lawyer (1939)
- Stronger Than Desire (1939)
- Young Tom Edison (1940)
- Edison, the Man (1940)
- Third Finger, Left Hand (1940)
- Married Bachelor (1941)
- Johnny Eager (1941)
- Men of Boys Town (1941)
- Design for Scandal (1941)
- Jackass Mail (1942)
- A Yank at Eton (1942)
- Three Hearts for Julia (1943)
- Salute to the Marines (1943)

== Bibliography ==
- Towlson, Jon. The Turn to Gruesomeness in American Horror Films, 1931-1936. McFarland, 2016.
