= Lady by Choice =

1934 film by David Burton

- Directed by: David Burton
- Written by: Dwight Taylor (story); Jo Swerling
- Produced by: Robert North
- Starring: Carole Lombard; May Robson
- Cinematography: Ted Tetzlaff
- Edited by: Viola Lawrence
- Music by: Louis Silvers
- Distributed by: Columbia Pictures
- Release date: October 15, 1934
- Running time: 85 minutes (original release); 76 minutes (current release)
- Country: United States
- Language: English

Lady by Choice is a 1934 American romantic drama film released by Columbia Pictures starring Carole Lombard as a fan dancer and May Robson as a homeless drunk asked to pose as the dancer's mother for a publicity stunt, with unexpected consequences. Promoted as a follow-up to Frank Capra's 1933 hit Lady for a Day (1933), it resembles the earlier film only in the casting of Robson.

== Plot ==
Cantankerous old lady Patsy Patterson is hauled before Judge Daly on charges of drunk and disorderly conduct. Also in court is fan dancer Alabam Lee, who is facing the judge on a morals charge. Alabam is given a suspended sentence of a year in prison while Patsy is condemned to an old ladies' home by the judge and lawyer Johnny Mill, who is committed to help her.

To help improve her image, Alabam's publicist Front O'Malley and manager Charlie Kendall concoct a plan for her to "adopt" a mother. They visit the old ladies' home with newspaper reporters and photographers ready to sensationalize the stunt. Alabam recognizes Patsy and selects her. Patsy is introduced as the daughter of a Confederate general.

Patsy is touched by Alabam's kind nature and begins to reform herself as well as Alabam. Patsy curtails her drinking and discovers that Kendall has been skimming most of Alabam's nightclub salary; Alabam fires Kendall as a result. Patsy wins $7,000 in a craps game and pretends that the money is from an inheritance. With Alabam out of work, the money is needed.

Patsy also encourages Alabam to take acting, dancing and elocution lessons. Patsy visits theatrical producer David Opper, for whom Patsy was a star many years ago. Opper reluctantly agrees to allow Alabam an audition, but she fails to impress him.

The wealthy Johnny meets Alabam and soon falls in love with her. Alabam tries to extract loan money from him. When Patsy realizes what Alabam is doing, the women quarrel and Patsy leaves Alabam.

Johnny asks Alabam to marry him but then informs her that his mother has promised to disown him and leave him a poor man if they marry. Alabam, who has fallen in love with Johnny, is relieved, because nobody will think that she is marrying him for his money. After Patsy and Johnny's mother visit Judge Daly asking him to stop the relationship, Daly calls Alabam into his office and threatens to reinstate her sentence, but she is unfazed. However, when he tells her that Johnny's career and social standing will be ruined by her past, she surrenders and returns to Kendall.

Patsy, who had also been initially opposed to the marriage, changes her mind when she sees that Alabam is truly in love. She reveals to Alabam that she was once in the same situation with Johnny's father before their relationship ended. Patsy has regretted the breakup ever since and does not want Alabam to repeat her mistake.

Alabam's fan dance at the nightclub is interrupted by the police, who take her to Judge Daly's office where she is confronted by Daly, Patsy and Johnny. Alabam embraces Johnny.

== Cast ==
- Carole Lombard as Alabam Lee
- May Robson as Patricia "Patsy" Patterson
- Roger Pryor as Johnny Mills
- Walter Connolly as Judge Daly
- Arthur Hohl as Charlie Kendall
- Raymond Walburn as Front O'Malley
- James Burke as Sergeant Brannigan
- Henry Kolker as David Opper
- Mariska Aldrich as Lucretia
- John T. Doyle as Walsh (as John Doyle)
