= Felix Bressart =

German-American actor

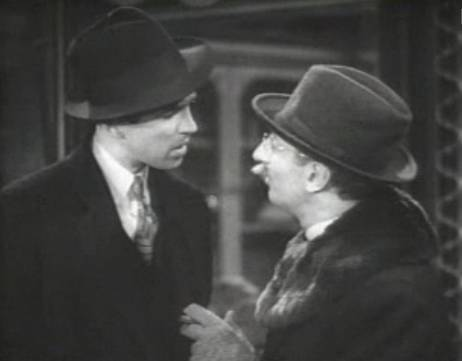
- Bressart with James Stewart in The Shop Around the Corner (1940)
- Born: March 2, 1895; Eydtkuhnen, East Prussia, Germany
- Died: March 17, 1949 (aged 54); Los Angeles, California, U.S.
- Occupation: Actor
- Years active: 1914–1949
- Spouse: Frieda Lehner (1925–1949, his death)

Felix Bressart (March 2, 1895 – March 17, 1949) was a German-born actor of stage and screen whose career spanned both Europe and Hollywood.

== Early days ==
Bressart (pronounced "BRESS-ert") was born in Eydtkuhnen, East Prussia, Germany (now in Nesterovsky District, Russia).

== Career ==
Bressart’s acting debut came in 1914 as Malvolio in Twelfth Night and he went on to act in Austria, Denmark, England, France, Germany, Hungary, and Yugoslavia. He was an experienced stage actor when he had his film debut in 1927. He began as a supporting actor, for example as the bailiff in the 1930 boxoffice hit Die Drei von der Tankstelle (The Three from the Filling Station), but soon established himself in leading roles of minor movies. After the Nazis seized power in 1933, the Jewish Bressart left Germany and continued his career in German-speaking movies in Austria, where Jewish artists were still relatively safe. After acting in 40 German films, he immigrated to the United States in 1936.

One of Bressart's former European colleagues was Joe Pasternak, who had become a successful producer at Metro-Goldwyn-Mayer. Bressart's first American film was Three Smart Girls Grow Up (1939), a vehicle for the Universal Pictures' star, Deanna Durbin. Pasternak chose Bressart to perform in a screen test opposite Pasternak's newest discovery, Gloria Jean. The German community in Hollywood helped to establish Bressart in America, as his earliest American movies were directed by Ernst Lubitsch, Henry Koster, and Wilhelm Thiele (who had directed Bressart in The Three from the Filling Station).

At MGM, Bressart appeared in Lubitsch's Ninotchka (1939), as one of the Soviet emissaries followed by Greta Garbo to Paris. MGM signed Bressart to a contract, where he appeared mostly in supporting roles in major films including Edison, the Man, Comrade X, and Lubitsch's The Shop Around the Corner, all released in 1940.

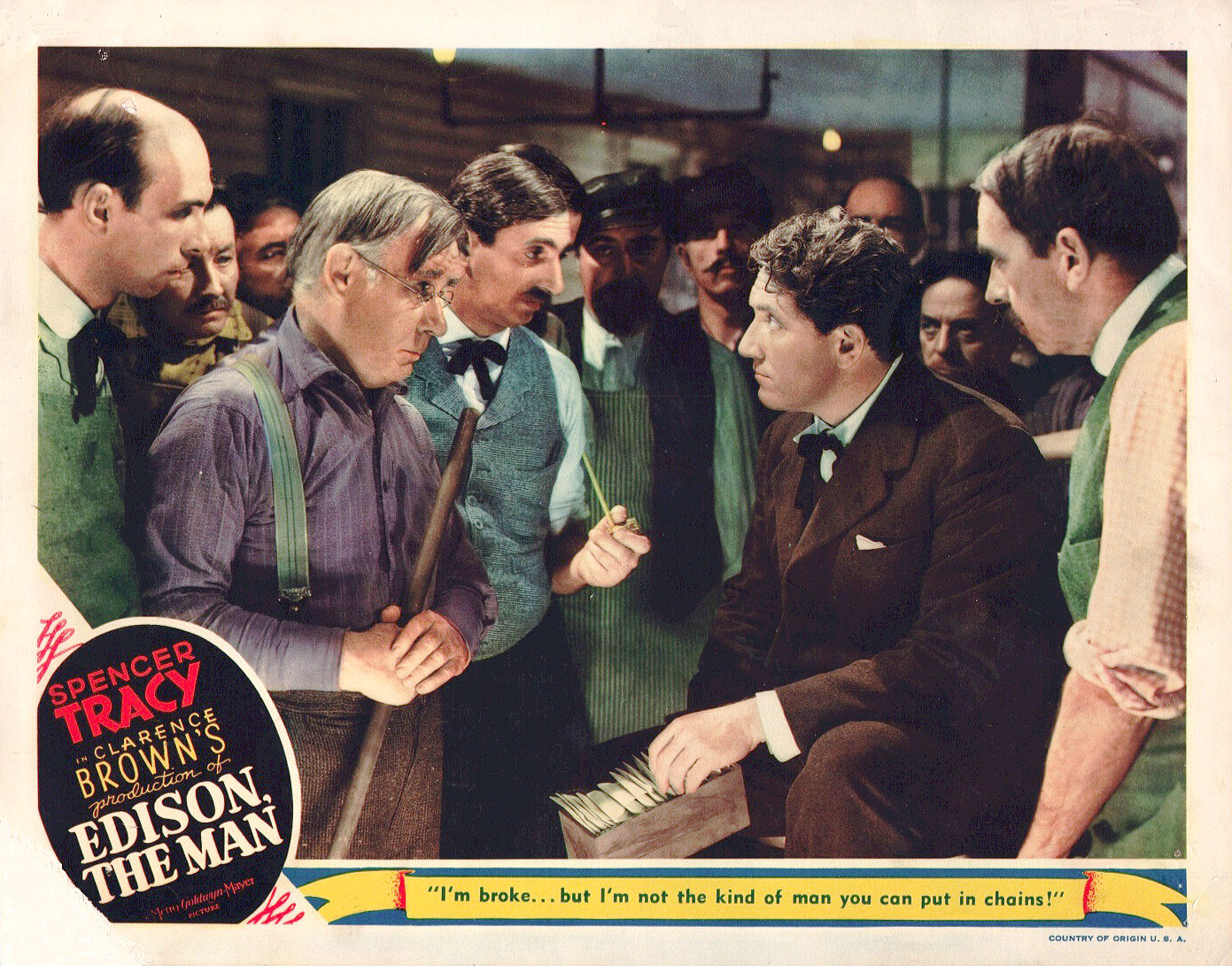
Lobby card from Edison, the Man – Bressart is third from the left.

In Lubitsch's To Be or Not to Be (1942), he recites Shylock's famous "Hath not a Jew eyes?" speech from The Merchant of Venice.

Other films Bressart appeared in for MGM include Blossoms in the Dust (1941), Three Hearts for Julia (1943), The Seventh Cross (1944), and Without Love (1945).

Bressart left MGM in 1945 to work for other studios. His first freelance job featured his largest role; he co-starred in the RKO "B" musical comedy Ding Dong Williams, filmed in April 1945. Bressart, billed third, played the bemused supervisor of a movie studio's music department, and appeared in formal wear to conduct an orchestral version of Chopin's Fantaisie-Impromptu. Bressart received special mention for his performance in this low-budget feature.

In all, Bressart appeared in almost 40 Hollywood pictures.

== Personal life ==
Bressart suddenly died of leukemia at the age of 54. His last film was to be My Friend Irma (1949), the movie version of a popular radio show. Bressart died during production, forcing the studio to reshoot his completed scenes with Hans Conried, who was playing the same role, "Professor Kropotkin," on radio. In the finished film, Felix Bressart is still seen in the long shots.

== Complete filmography ==
=== German language films ===
- Liebe im Kuhstall (Love in the Cowshed) (1928) - Der Gerichtsvollzieher
- Es gibt eine Frau, die dich niemals vergißt (1930)
- Der Sohn der weißen Berge (The Son of the White Mountain) (1930) - Jailer
- Der Kampf mit dem Drachen oder: Die Tragödie des Untermieters (1930, Short) - Der Untermieter
- Die zärtlichen Verwandten (The Tender Relatives) (1930) - Onkel Emil
- Die Drei von der Tankstelle (1930) - Gerichtsvollzieher / Bailiff
- Der keusche Josef (Josef the Chaste) (1930) - Eizes, ihr Faktotum
- Das alte Lied (The Old Song) (1930) - Jacques
- Drei Tage Mittelarrest (Three Days Confined to Barracks) (1930) - Franz Nowotni, Fuesilier
- Eine Freundin so goldig wie Du (1930) - Richard
- Die Privatsekretärin (The Private Secretary) (1931) - Bankdiener Hasel
- Der wahre Jakob (The True Jacob) (1931) - Böcklein
- Der Schrecken der Garnison (Terror of the Garrison) (1931) - Musketier Kulicke
- Nie wieder Liebe! (No More Love) (1931) - Jean
- Trara um Liebe (1931) - Major Fröschen
- Ausflug ins Leben (1931) - Hirsekorn - Schauspieler und Chauffeur
- Kameradschaft (Comradeship) (1931) - Café Doorman (uncredited)
- Der Herr Bürovorsteher (The Office Manager) (1931) - Joachim Reißnagel
- Holzapfel weiß alles (Holzapfel Knows Everything) (1932) - Johannes Georg Holzapfel
- Der Glückszylinder (The Magic Top Hat) (1932) - Gottfried Jonathan Bankbeamter
- ...und wer küßt mich? (And Who Is Kissing Me?) (1933) - Direktor Ritter
- Wie d'Warret würkt (1933) - Herr Schramek
- C'était un musicien (1933) - Le baron Vandernyff
- Salto in die Seligkeit (Leap into Bliss) (1933) - Kriegel, Geheimdetektiv
- Peter (1934) - Her grandfather
- Ball at the Savoy (1935) - Birowitsch, der Sekretär
- Alles für die Firma (Everything for the Company) (1935) - Philipp Sonndorfer
- Viereinhalb Musketiere (1935) - Professor Volksmann
- Heut' ist der schönste Tag in meinem Leben (1935) - Max Kaspar

=== English language films ===
- Three Smart Girls Grow Up (1939) - Music Teacher
- Bridal Suite (1939) - Maxl
- Ninotchka (1939) - Comrade Buljanoff
- Swanee River (1939) - Henry Kleber
- The Shop Around the Corner (1940) - Pirovitch
- It All Came True (1940) - The Great Boldini
- Edison, the Man (1940) - Michael Simon
- Third Finger, Left Hand (1940) - August Winkel
- Escape (1940) - Fritz Keller
- Bitter Sweet (1940) - Max
- Comrade X (1940) - Vanya
- Ziegfeld Girl (1941) - Mischa
- Blossoms in the Dust (1941) - Dr. Max Breslar
- Married Bachelor (1941) - Professor Ladislaus Milic
- Kathleen (1941) - Mr. Schoner
- Mr. and Mrs. North (1942) - Arthur Talbot
- To Be or Not to Be (1942) - Greenberg
- Crossroads (1942) - Dr. Andre Tessier
- Iceland (1942) - Papa Jonsdottir
- Three Hearts for Julia (1943) - Anton Ottoway
- Above Suspicion (1943) - Mr. A. Werner
- Don't Be a Sucker (1943, Short) - Anti-Nazi Teacher (uncredited)
- Song of Russia (1944) - Petrov
- The Seventh Cross (1944) - Poldi Schlamm
- Greenwich Village (1944) - Hofer
- Blonde Fever (1944) - Johnny
- Secrets in the Dark (1944, Short)
- Without Love (1945) - Prof. Ginza
- Dangerous Partners (1945) - Prof. Roland Budlow
- Ding Dong Williams (1946) - Hugo Meyerhold
- The Thrill of Brazil (1946) - Ludwig Kriegspiel
- Her Sister's Secret (1946) - Pepe - New Orleans Cafe Owner
- I've Always Loved You (1946) - Frederick Hassman
- A Song Is Born (1948) - Professor Gerkikoff
- Portrait of Jennie (1948) - Pete
- Take One False Step (1949) - Professor Morris Avrum (final film role)
