= Once Upon a Honeymoon =

1942 film by Leo McCarey

- Theatrical release poster
- Directed by: Leo McCarey
- Screenplay by: Sheridan Gibney
- Story by: Sheridan Gibney; Leo McCarey
- Produced by: Leo McCarey (uncredited)
- Starring: Cary Grant; Ginger Rogers; Walter Slezak; Albert Dekker; Albert Bassermann
- Cinematography: George Barnes
- Edited by: Theron Warth
- Music by: Robert Emmett Dolan
- Distributed by: RKO Radio Pictures
- Release date: November 27, 1942
- Running time: 117 minutes
- Country: United States
- Language: English
- Box office: $2.6 million (US rentals)

Once Upon a Honeymoon is a 1942 romantic comedy/drama starring Cary Grant, Ginger Rogers, and Walter Slezak, directed by Leo McCarey, and released by RKO Radio Pictures. It was nominated for the Oscar for Best Sound Recording (Stephen Dunn).

== Plot ==
In the days leading up to World War II, Katie O'Hara (Ginger Rogers), an American burlesque performer masquerading as American socialite "Katherine Butt-Smith", pronounced byüt-smith, is about to marry Austrian Baron Von Luber (Walter Slezak). Foreign correspondent Pat O'Toole (Cary Grant) suspects Von Luber of being a Nazi sympathizer and tries unsuccessfully to get information from Katie by deceit, but is warned off by Von Luber.

Undaunted, O'Toole follows the couple to Prague, where O'Hara and Von Luber marry. After the German occupation of Czechoslovakia, the Von Lubers travel to Warsaw, where the Baron sells arms to Polish General Borelski (Albert Bassermann). O'Toole warns the General of the dangers of trusting in Von Luber. When the General tries the weapons he finds out he has been sold duds and plans to notify his government. When the Germans invade Poland, the weapons prove to be defective. Von Luber is arrested on suspicion but warns his young bride not to worry because no one will be able to bear witness against him. Soon after, the General is assassinated along with a young Nazi the Baron has chosen to sacrifice. While the Baron is in jail, O'Hara and O'Toole decide to flee the country. However, O'Hara has given her passport to her Jewish maid Anna, so that the woman and her two children may escape the country. O'Hara and O'Toole escape to Norway, the Netherlands, Belgium and Paris, all of which sequentially fall to the Germans with the clandestine help of Von Luber.

In Paris, O'Hara and O'Toole go to have new passports made. They meet Gaston Le Blanc (Albert Dekker), an American counterintelligence agent posing as a photographer. LeBlanc persuades O'Hara to return to the Baron and work as a spy. Von Luber becomes suspicious due to O'Hara's persistent questioning. O'Toole agrees to broadcast pro-Nazi propaganda after the Baron threatens to turn O'Hara over to the Gestapo. O'Toole is then contacted by American counterintelligence who ask him to accept the offer and betray the Baron. When O'Hara is found with LeBlanc, who is shot by two Nazi agents, she is placed under house arrest. Anna finds her in the hotel and aids in her escape. O'Toole goes on the air, but after O'Hara shows up at the studio, he cleverly manages to make it look as if the Baron is trying to overthrow Hitler by suggesting that Luber is a superior leader even to the Fuhrer. O'Toole ends his speech with the idiom "Tell it to the Marines", a cultural reference which Americans would understand as a signal that the entire speech was malarkey but the Germans would miss. Von Luber is arrested, and Pat and Katie sneak away.

They board a ship for America, but Katie later runs into Von Luber on board; the Baron was able to talk his way out of his troubles. Now he is on his way to the United States to continue his subversive activities. They struggle and Von Luber falls overboard. O'Hara tells O'Toole and hesitantly he agrees to tell the Captain. The Captain turns the ship around to search for Von Luber, but when O'Hara says that Von Luber cannot swim, the Captain happily turns the ship back towards America.

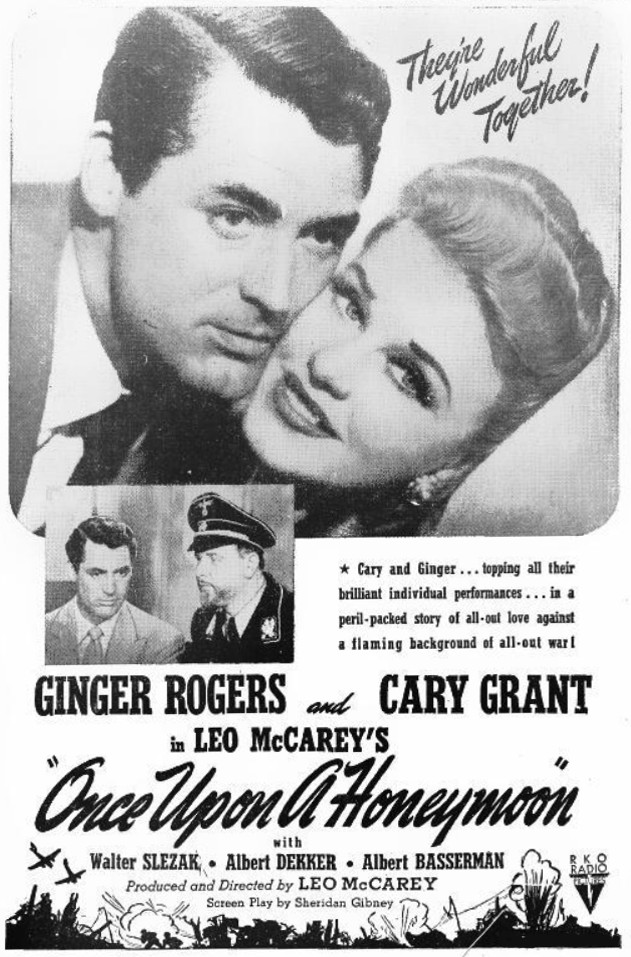
1943 advertisement for Once Upon a Honeymoon

== Cast ==
- Cary Grant as Patrick 'Pat' O'Toole
- Ginger Rogers as Katie O'Hara / Katherine Butt-Smith / Baroness Katherine Von Luber
- Walter Slezak as Obergruppenführer Baron Franz Von Luber
- Albert Dekker as Gaston Le Blanc
- Albert Bassermann as General Borelski
- Ferike Boros as Elsa
- John Banner as German Capt. Von Kleinoch
- Harry Shannon as Ed Cumberland
- Natasha Lytess as Anna
- Emory Parnell as Quisling

== Production ==
Once Upon a Honeymoon was Walter Slezak's first American film.

== Reception ==
The film was a hit, earning RKO a profit of $282,000.

== See also ==
- List of American films of 1942
