= Hugo Butler =

American screenwriter (1914–1968)

- Born: Hugo Dansey Butler; May 4, 1914; Calgary, Alberta, Canada
- Died: January 7, 1968 (aged 53); Hollywood, California, U.S.
- Other names: H.B. Addis; Hugo Mozo; Philip Ansell Roll
- Education: University of Washington
- Occupation: Screenwriter
- Spouse: Jean Rouverol (m. 1930)
- Father: Frank Butler (father)

Hugo Dansey Butler (4 May 1914 – 7 January 1968) was a Canadian-American screenwriter. He was a victim of the Hollywood blacklist during the 1950s, and subsequently worked in Mexico and Europe under a variety of pseudonyms, notably in collaboration with directors Luis Buñuel, Joseph Losey (a fellow blacklistee) and Robert Aldrich. He had previously been nominated for an Academy Award for Best Story for Edison the Man (1940).

== Early life and education ==
Butler was born in Calgary, Alberta in 1914 to British-born parents Frank Russell Butler and Margaret Annie Dansey Addis. At the time, his father was working for the Canadian Pacific Railway. Butler's parents divorced sometime after World War I, and his father moved to the United States, where he became a silent film actor and later an Oscar-winning screenwriter. He and his mother moved to Victoria, British Columbia, where he'd spend most of his childhood.

He studied journalism at the University of Washington in Seattle, before moving to Hollywood to accept a junior writing position at Metro-Goldwyn-Mayer in mid-1930s. Sometime around late 1936, Butler became a naturalised American citizen.

== Career ==
Butler's first produced screenplay at MGM was for the 1937 Luise Rainer/Spencer Tracy vehicle Big City (1937). He wrote scripts for A Christmas Carol (1938), The Adventures of Huckleberry Finn (1939), Young Tom Edison and its companion film Edison the Man (both 1940), Jean Renoir's The Southerner (1945), and From This Day Forward (1946). His work on Edison the Man led to his nomination (with Dore Schary) for the Best Story Oscar.

He was an early member of the Screen Writers Guild, and for a time served as guild vice president.

On May 5, 1945, during World War II, Butler enlisted in the United States Army.

=== Blacklisting ===
Butler and his wife Jean Rouverol had joined the Communist Party in 1943, after being introduced by their friend Waldo Salt, but left before 1947. He fronted for Hollywood Ten member Dalton Trumbo on 1951's The Prowler, directed by Joseph Losey, who himself would later be blacklisted.

Later that year, Butler was subpoenaed by the House Un-American Activities Committee (HUAC). He and his family subsequently went to Mexico, where he worked on scripts for directors Luis Buñuel, Carlos Velo and Robert Aldrich. He was a handful of blacklisted artists responsible for the Nuevo Cine movement in Mexico, according to Rebecca Mina Schreiber's Cold War Exiles in Mexico. While in Mexico, Butler directed his only film, the 1960 baseball drama Los pequeños gigantes.

While living in Italy, he would also continue writing for Aldrich and Losey. He wrote Sodom and Gomorrah for the former and Eva for the latter. He and his family did not return to the United States on a permanent basis for 13 years.

While blacklisted, he wrote under various pseudonyms as well as using a fellow member of the Writers Guild of America as a front to submit screenplays to the movie studios on his behalf. In 1963, under his real name, he wrote A Face in the Rain for Embassy Pictures.

== Personal life ==
In 1940, he married actress Jean Rouverol, later an author and screenwriter. The couple would have six children, including screenwriter Michael Butler.

=== Health issues and death ===
Butler suffered from arteriosclerosis for several years before he died from a heart attack in January 1968 in Hollywood, California. He was survived by his wife Jean and six children, including screenwriter Michael Butler. His death occurred shortly before he was about to rise from the Hollywood blacklist after co-writing the 1968 film The Legend of Lylah Clare with his wife.

In 1997, the Board of Directors of the Writers Guild of America voted to posthumously give him official credit for scripts he had written.

== Legacy ==
Butler's sole directorial work Los pequeños gigantes was preserved by the Academy Film Archive in 2007.

== Partial filmography ==
- Edison the Man (story, 1940)
- Blossoms in the Dust (1941)
- A Yank on the Burma Road (1942)
- Lassie Come Home (1943)
- The Southerner (1945)
- Miss Susie Slagle's (1946)
- From This Day Forward (1946)
- A Woman of Distinction (1950)
- He Ran All the Way (1951)
- The Big Night (1951)
- The Adventures of Robinson Crusoe (1954)
- Torero (1956)
- Autumn Leaves (1956)
- Los pequeños gigantes (1958)
- The Young One (1960)
- The Legend of Lylah Clare (1968)
