= Robinson Crusoe (1954 film) =

1954 film by Luis Buñuel

- Mexican film poster
- Directed by: Luis Buñuel
- Written by: Luis Alcoriza; Luis Buñuel; Hugo Butler
- Based on: Robinson Crusoe (1719 novel) by Daniel Defoe
- Produced by: Óscar Dancigers; George Pepper
- Starring: Daniel O'Herlihy; Jaime Fernández; Felipe de Alba
- Cinematography: Alex Phillips
- Edited by: Carlos Savage; Alberto Valenzuela
- Music by: Anthony Collins
- Production company: Producciones Tepeyac; Oscar Dancigers Productions
- Distributed by: Distribuidora Mexicana de Películas (Mexico); United Artists (U.S. and international territories)
- Release dates: August 5, 1954 (U.S.); June 30, 1955 (Mexico)
- Running time: 89 minutes
- Countries: Mexico; United States
- Languages: English; Spanish
- Budget: US$300,000

Robinson Crusoe (Spanish: Aventuras de Robinson Crusoe; also released as Adventures of Robinson Crusoe) is a 1954 adventure film directed and co-written by Luis Buñuel, based on the 1719 novel by Daniel Defoe. It stars Dan O'Herlihy as Crusoe and Jaime Fernández as Friday. Both English and Spanish versions were produced, making it Buñuel's first English-language film.

The film was entered into the 15th Venice International Film Festival, and was a critical and commercial success. In Mexico, it won six Ariel Awards, including Best Picture and Best Director. O'Herlihy was nominated for an Academy Award for Best Actor, and the film was nominated for a BAFTA Award for Best Film from Any Source.

== Plot ==
Robinson Crusoe, his parents' third son with few prospects, goes to sea against his father's wishes. On a voyage from Brazil to Africa to purchase slaves, a storm forces him to abandon ship. He manages to swim to a deserted island somewhere in the Atlantic Ocean on September 30, 1659.

The abandoned ship turns up on an offshore rock, allowing him to salvage food, tools, firearms and other items before it sinks. He herds goats, hunts game, makes clothes, and builds a home, with only the company of a dog, Rex, and a cat, Sam, his only fellow castaways; he later captures a parrot which he names Paul and teaches it to speak. Crusoe lets Sam and her kittens run wild. When Rex dies of old age in 1673, Crusoe nearly goes insane from loneliness.

In 1677, Crusoe discovers that cannibals are visiting his island with their victims. The next time he spots them with his telescope, he sees a prisoner make a break for it, pursued by two cannibals. He knocks out one and shoots the other; when the first one regains consciousness, the escapee kills him with Crusoe's sword. Crusoe takes the man back to his stockade.

He names him Friday (after the day of the week they met). Crusoe teaches him English and Western customs and turns Friday into a servant. Crusoe does not trust him at first, believing Friday to also be a cannibal who would kill him if given the chance. He builds a door to the cave in which he takes to sleeping. When Friday enters without permission late one night to sneak some tobacco, Crusoe puts leg irons on him. The next day, however, Crusoe relents and takes them off. He comes to trust his new companion completely.

In 1687, Friday saves Crusoe from a cannibal sneaking up behind him. Seeing a large group, they flee back to their stockade. The cannibals, however, are driven off by white men with guns. Captain Oberzo and his bosun are the victims of a mutiny; the mutineers landed to get fresh water and maroon the two. Crusoe and Friday rescue the men and get away undetected. Friday then goes to the leader of the mutiny, offering him a basket of fruit, but the mutineers are more interested in the necklace of gold coins (salvaged from Crusoe's ship) he is wearing. Friday leads the greedy men to the stockade. There, Crusoe, Friday, Oberzo, and the bosun capture them. Oberzo regains control of his ship. At Crusoe's suggestion, Oberzo allows the mutineers to remain on the island rather than being sent to the gallows. Crusoe leaves them his tools and instructions on how to survive.

Crusoe leaves for home with Friday, having spent 28 years, two months, and 19 days on the island.

== Cast ==
- Daniel O'Herlihy as Robinson Crusoe / Crusoe's father
- Jaime Fernández as Friday
- Felipe de Alba as Captain Oberzo
- Chel López as The Bosun
- José Chávez as Pirate
- Emilio Garibay as Lead Mutineer

== Production ==
=== Development and casting ===
Luis Buñuel began working with screenwriter Hugo Butler in 1950 on a script. Alex Phillips was hired as the cinematographer. More than 300 actors were considered for the lead role. O'Herlihy recalled that the producers of the film wanted Buñuel to use Orson Welles for the role, with Buñuel refusing, saying he was too loud and too fat. They arranged a screening of Welles' Macbeth to show how a bearded Welles would look, but Buñuel demanded O'Herlihy, who played Macduff, for the lead role. Negotiations with O'Herlihy occurred at the last moment and under strict conditions of secrecy to prevent a wealthier motion picture studio from rushing a similar story into production.

Jaime Fernández was a cousin of well-known Mexican actor/director Emilio Fernández, but was working as a grip when discovered by Buñuel. He spoke no English, and learned it on the set much as his character did.

=== Filming and post-production ===
Filming began on July 7, 1952, on the west coast of Mexico. Principal photography was scheduled for seven weeks, with both an English and Spanish language version shot simultaneously. Both films were budgeted at a total of $350,000. Exterior shots were filmed near the city of Manzanillo in the Mexican state of Colima. There were 60 people in the production crew. The crew took daily doses of Diodoquin and aralen to guard against dysentery and malaria, respectively. A security squad of local Manzanillans kept snakes, wild boar, and other dangerous animals at bay with guns and machetes. Interior shots were filmed on Sound Stage 3 at Tepeyac Studios in Mexico City. The negatives were flown to Hollywood, where they were developed and color-corrected.

Three times a week, Buñuel, Phillips, the producers, O'Herlihy, and others watched the rushes in a local movie theater. Editing and scoring were also done in Mexico City. For the Spanish version, O'Herlihy's dialogue was dubbed by Buñuel 's regular collaborator Claudio Brook.

According to O'Herlihy, Buñuel saw the central theme of the story as that of a man who ages and almost loses his mind, only to find that companionship is his salvation. O'Herlihy also said that the script was used only for the first week of shooting. Afterward, Buñuel and O'Herlihy would merely discuss the story and how O'Herlihy should act and react.

== Release ==
The producers initially believed the film would be ready for distribution by December 1952, but numerous delays upset these plans. On October 14, 1953, the producers announced that United Artists had signed an agreement for worldwide distribution rights to the film. The film premiered in New York City on August 4, 1954, at the Normandie Theatre.

== Reception ==
The film was Buñuel's most successful film in the United States until Belle de Jour was released in 1969.

Review aggregator website Rotten Tomatoes gave the film a score of 100% based on 12 reviews, with an average rating of 8/10.

=== Awards and nominations ===
Institution	Year	Category	Nominee	Result
Academy Awards	1955	Best Actor	Dan O'Herlihy	Nominated
Ariel Awards	1956	Best Picture	Luis Buñuel	Won
Ariel Awards	1956	Best Director	Luis Buñuel	Won
Ariel Awards	1956	Best Screenplay	Luis Buñuel	Won
Ariel Awards	1956	Best Supporting Actor	Jaime Fernández	Won
Ariel Awards	1956	Best Cinematography	Alex Phillips	Nominated
Ariel Awards	1956	Best Editing	Carlos Savage	Won
Ariel Awards	1956	Best Production Design	Edward Fitzgerald	Won
BAFTA Awards	1955	Best Film from Any Source	—N/a	Nominated
Venice Film Festival	1954	Golden Lion	Luis Buñuel	Nominated

== See also ==
- Survival film, about the film genre, with a list of related films
