= W. E. Woodward =

William E. Woodward (October 2, 1874 – September 27, 1950) was an American author best known for his biographies that reassessed historical figures. He coined the word "debunk".

== Biography ==
William E. Woodward was born in Ridge Spring, South Carolina, on October 2, 1874. His parents, Thomas J. Woodward and Etta Gunter Woodward, were farmers. William attended the South Carolina Military Academy. After graduation, he worked as a reporter and publicist before writing his first book, which was published in 1923. Woodward's first publications were novels, but he shifted toward biography as his career progressed. He coined the term "debunk" in his first novel. His 1933 work Evelyn Prentice was adapted into a 1934 film.

As an author, Woodward became known for histories that aimed to expose inadequacies in historical figures who were generally idolized. These figures included George Washington and Ulysses S. Grant.

== Personal life and death ==
Woodward married Helen Rosen in 1913. He died on September 27, 1950, in Augusta, Georgia.

== Bibliography ==
- Bunk (1923)
- Lottery (1924)
- Bread and Circuses (1925)
- Washington: The Image and the Man (1926)
- Meet General Grant (1928)
- Evelyn Prentice (1933)
- A New American History (1936)
- The Way Our People Lived (1944)
- Tom Paine: America's Godfather (1945)
- The Gift of Life (1947)
- Years of Madness (1951)
