= Evelyn Prentice =

1934 film by William K. Howard

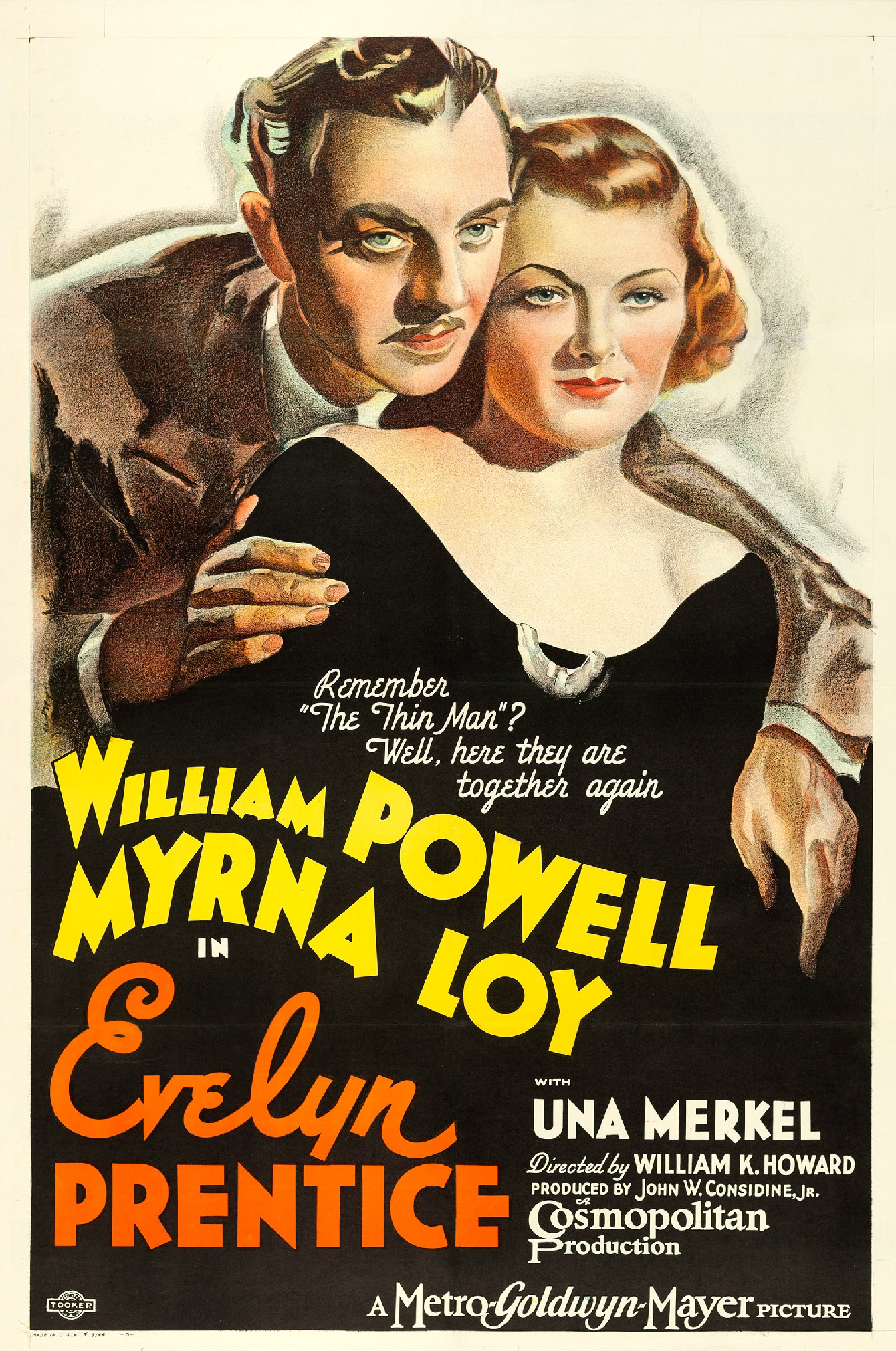
- theatrical release poster
- Directed by: William K. Howard
- Written by: Lenore J. Coffee; Uncredited: Howard Emmett Rogers (adaptation)
- Based on: Evelyn Prentice; 1933 novel by W. E. Woodward
- Produced by: John W. Considine Jr.
- Starring: William Powell; Myrna Loy
- Cinematography: Charles G. Clarke
- Edited by: Frank E. Hull
- Music by: Oscar Radin; R. H. Bassett (uncredited)
- Production company: Cosmopolitan Productions
- Distributed by: Metro-Goldwyn-Mayer
- Release date: November 9, 1934 (U.S.)
- Running time: 78-80 minutes
- Country: United States
- Language: English
- Budget: $498,000 (est.)
- Box office: $1,166,000 (worldwide est.)

Evelyn Prentice is a 1934 American crime drama film starring William Powell and Myrna Loy, and featuring Una Merkel and Rosalind Russell in her film debut. The movie was based on the 1933 novel of the same name by W. E. Woodward. Filmed between the original Thin Man and the first of its sequels, William Powell and Myrna Loy are re-teamed as another husband-and-wife team knee deep in a murder mystery.

== Plot ==
John Prentice is a brilliant lawyer who neglects his wife. The action starts when John is unable to go to a dinner party because of work. Evelyn, his wife, and her guests end up at a night club where Lawrence Kennard, a poet and gigolo, tries to strike up a conversation but is rebuffed. Lawrence sends her some of his books and she begins a flirtation with him. In the meantime, her husband obtains an acquittal for a Nancy Harrison. When John has to go to Boston for business, Nancy follows and tries to seduce him. A watch is sent to Evelyn stating it was left on the train in Mr. Prentices' drawing room leading Evelyn to believe her husband has been unfaithful.

She began the relationship but breaks it off when she realizes she is still in love with her husband. Lawrence attempts to blackmail her with letters she wrote. A shot is fired. Meanwhile, Amy, a friend of Evelyn's, shows John the watch. He corrects his ways by becoming more attentive. Judith Wilson, Lawrence's main paramour, is charged with the crime. Evelyn, along with their small daughter, convinces her husband to take on Wilson's defense. But, as the case progresses, she becomes more and more worried that Judith will be convicted. She decides she must go to court and confess. Despite her husband's efforts to prevent her, Evelyn blurts out that she apparently shot Kennard when they struggled over the gun. John manages to get Judith to confess to shooting Kennard, and to convince the jury it was self-defense. Once it is all over, John tells Evelyn all is forgiven and forgotten.

== Cast ==
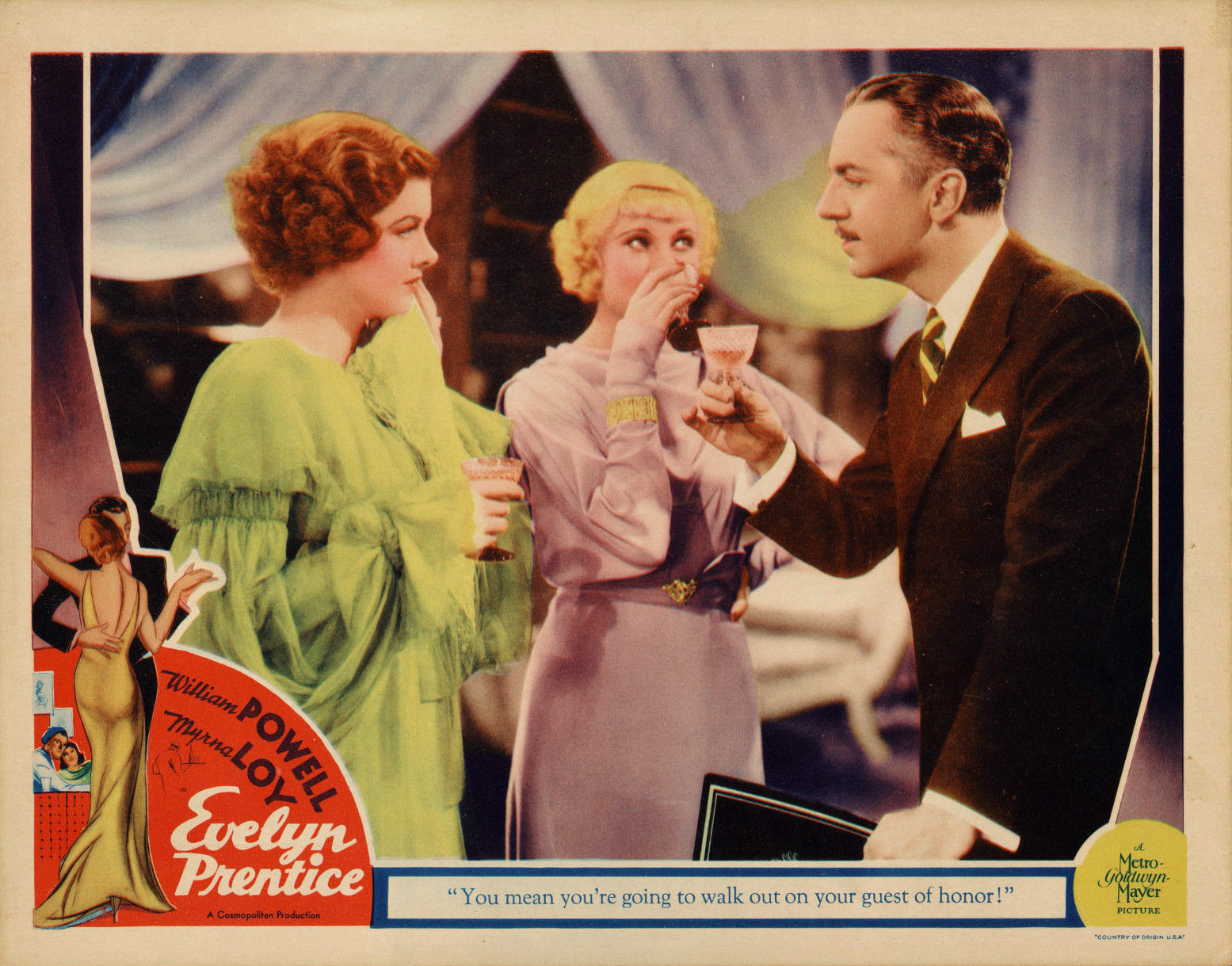
Lobby card

- William Powell as John Prentice
- Myrna Loy as Evelyn Prentice
- Una Merkel as Amy Drexel
- Rosalind Russell as Mrs. Nancy Harrison
- Isabel Jewell as Judith Wilson
- Harvey Stephens as Lawrence Kennard
- Edward Brophy as Eddie Delaney
- Henry Wadsworth as Chester Wylie
- Cora Sue Collins as Dorothy Prentice
- Frank Conroy as District Attorney Farley
- Jessie Ralph as Mrs. Blake

Nicholas Brothers cabaret tap dance duo

== Box office ==
The film grossed a total (domestic and foreign) of $1,166,000: $700,000 from the US and Canada and $466,000 elsewhere. It made a profit of $244,000.

== Television broadcast ==
This film was initially telecast in Los Angeles Thursday October 31, 1957 on KTTV (Channel 11), followed by Philadelphia Wednesday February 19, 1959 on WFIL (Channel 6) and by San Francisco October 15, 1958 on KGO (Channel 7).
