= Baby Jane =

Baby Jane may refer to:

== Books ==
- What Ever Happened to Baby Jane (novel), a 1960 novel by Henry Farrell
- Baby Jane, a novel by Finnish writer Sofi Oksanen

== Persons ==
- Baby Jane Holzer (born Jane Bruckenfeld, 1940), American fashion model and Warhol superstar of the 1960s
- Juanita Quigley (1931–2017), American actress billed as "Baby Jane" in several early roles
- Sofia Bella Galuz (born August 1, 2001), American musician and producer known as "Baby Jane" professionally.

== Film, television and video games ==
- What Ever Happened to Baby Jane (1962 film), a film based on the novel, starring Bette Davis and Joan Crawford
- What Ever Happened to Baby Jane (1991 film), a remake based on the novel, starring Vanessa Redgrave and Lynn Redgrave
- Baby Jane Hudson, a character from the above work
- Baby Jane, a Splicer model in the video games BioShock and BioShock 2

== Music ==
- "Baby Jane", song from Midnight Rave With The Pleazers EP written Dello, Cane
- "Baby Jane" (Rod Stewart song), 1983
- "Baby Jane" (Dr. Feelgood song), 1977
- Baby Jane (EP), an EP by Honey Is Cool
- Baby Jane, Christina Aguilera's alias for the 2006 album Back to Basics
