= Susan Peters =

American actress (1921–1952)

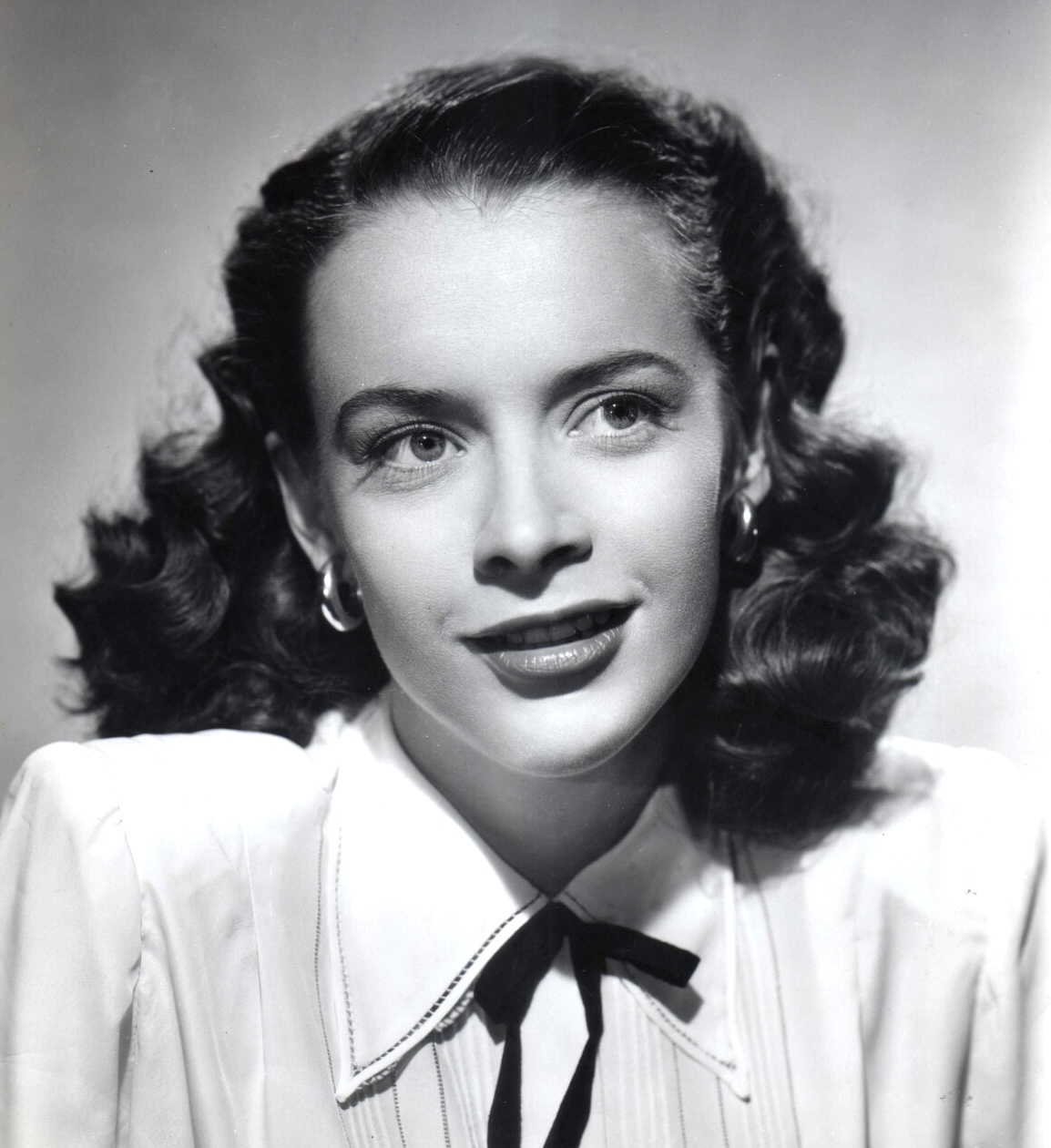
- Peters in 1948
- Born: Suzanne Carnahan; July 3, 1921; Spokane, Washington, U.S.
- Died: October 23, 1952 (aged 31); Visalia, California, U.S.
- Resting place: Forest Lawn Memorial Park, Glendale, California
- Occupation: Actress
- Years active: 1940–1952
- Spouse: Richard Quine (m. 1943; div. 1948)
- Children: 1

Susan Peters (born Suzanne Carnahan; July 3, 1921 – October 23, 1952) was an American actress who appeared in more than twenty films over the course of her decade-long career. Though she began her career in uncredited and ingénue roles, she would establish herself as a serious dramatic actress in the mid-1940s.

Born in Spokane, Washington, Peters was raised by her widowed mother in Portland, Oregon, and, later, Los Angeles. Upon graduating from Hollywood High School, she studied acting with Austrian theater director Max Reinhardt, and signed a contract with Warner Bros. Pictures. She appeared in numerous bit parts before earning a minor supporting role in Santa Fe Trail (1940). She made her last film for Warner Bros. in 1942, the film noir The Big Shot opposite Humphrey Bogart and Richard Travis; after its release, Warner opted not to renew her contract.

In 1942, Peters appeared in a supporting role in Tish, which resulted in her signing a contract with Metro-Goldwyn-Mayer (MGM). The same year, she had a featured role in the Mervyn LeRoy-directed drama Random Harvest, which earned her an Academy Award nomination for Best Supporting Actress and established her as a serious dramatic performer. Peters went on to appear as the lead in numerous films for MGM, including roles in the romantic comedy Young Ideas (1943), and several war films: Assignment in Brittany (1943), Song of Russia (1944), and Keep Your Powder Dry (1945).

On New Year's Day 1945, Peters' spinal cord was damaged from an accidental gunshot wound, leaving her permanently paraplegic. She returned to film, portraying a villainess who used a wheelchair in The Sign of the Ram (1948). Peters then transitioned to theater, appearing as Laura Wingfield in a critically acclaimed 1949 production of Tennessee Williams's The Glass Menagerie, which was slightly altered to allow Peters to perform in a wheelchair. She followed this with a production of The Barretts of Wimpole Street, in which she portrayed physically disabled poet Elizabeth Barrett Browning. By 1952, however, Peters had had clinical depression for several years due to the dissolution of her marriage and her limited career options. In late 1952, she began starving herself, which, combined with her paralysis, led to chronic kidney infections and pneumonia. She died of ensuing health complications that year at age 31.

== Life and career ==
=== 1921–1939: Early life ===
Peters was born Suzanne Carnahan on July 3, 1921, in Spokane, Washington, the elder of two children born to Robert and Abby Carnahan. Her father was a civil engineer of Irish descent, while her mother was of French descent, and a grand-niece of Robert E. Lee. Peters had one younger brother, Robert Jr., born in 1923. Shortly after her birth, the Carnahan family moved to Portland, Oregon. In 1928, her father was killed in a car accident in Portland, after which the family relocated to Seattle, Washington, (Note: U.S. Census data from 1930 lists Abby Carnahan a widow residing in Seattle, King County, Washington, with her daughter, Suzanne, and son, Robert.) and later to Los Angeles to live with Peters' maternal French-born grandmother, Maria Patteneaude, a dermatologist. (Note: An article published in The San Bernardino County Sun in January 1943 notes that Peters and her mother "came to Hollywood when Suzanne was still an infant," which contradicts 1930 census records showing that she resided with her family in Seattle, and biographical sources stating the family resided in Portland, Oregon leading up to her father's death.)

Peters was educated at Laird Hall School for Girls, the LaRue School in Azusa, California, and Flintridge Sacred Heart Academy in Los Angeles. During her years in high school, she worked after hours in a Los Angeles department store, earning money to help support her mother and brother. Peters' mother supported herself and her two children by working in a dress shop and managing an apartment building. "We were poor but we managed, and we had fun," Peters recalled of her upbringing. She was an avid swimmer and tennis player, and also grew up riding horses; her talent as an equestrian allowed her to earn additional income by breaking and showing other people's horses.

Peters transferred to Hollywood High School during her senior year, and began taking drama classes in which she opted to enroll in place of cooking courses: "I took a drama course instead of a cooking course because I thought it was easier," Peters said. "Acting meant money, and [my family] needed money." While still in high school, she signed with a talent agent. She graduated from Hollywood High School in June 1939, along with Jason Robards, Sheila Ryan, and Dorothy Morris as members of her graduating class. With a newfound interest in acting, Peters earned a scholarship to the Max Reinhardt School of Dramatic Arts.

While performing in a showcase production of Philip Barry's Holiday at the Reinhardt School, Peters was spotted by a talent scout for Metro-Goldwyn-Mayer (MGM), who gave her a walk-on part in George Cukor's Susan and God (1940). During the shoot, Peters was reportedly so nervous that she fainted in front of the camera. Despite her apprehension on set, Peters became a protégée of Cukor, who personally assigned her to private acting lessons with drama coach Gertrude Vogler. Cukor believed Peters had star potential, but needed to not "talk through [her] nose." He later recalled that she reminded him of "a young Katharine Hepburn. Not as aggressive as Kate, but that same finishing school appearance and drive."

=== 1940–1941: Contract with Warner Bros. ===
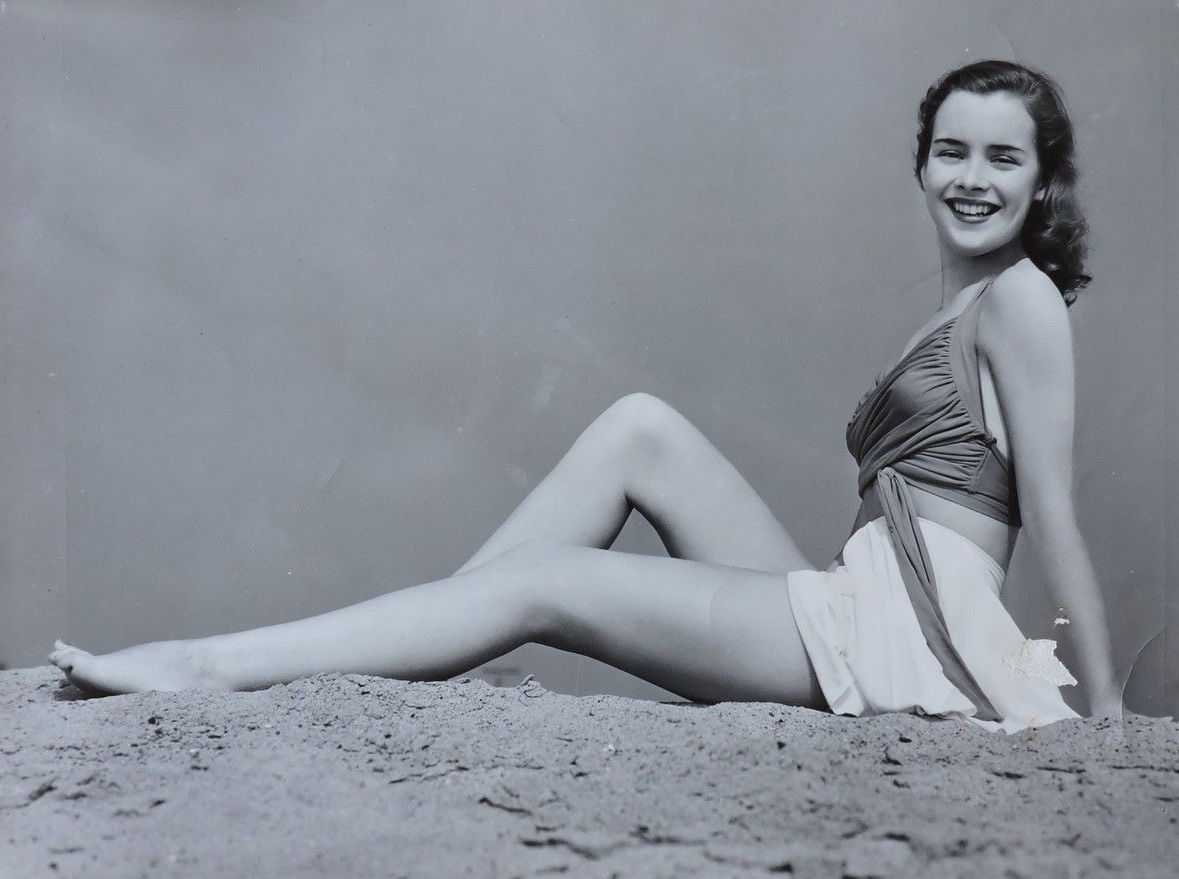
Peters in an early 1941 portrait for Warner Bros. as Suzanne Carnahan

In early 1940, Peters screen tested for Warner Bros. Pictures, who subsequently offered her a contract. Then credited under her birth name, Suzanne Carnahan, Peters was cast in various small parts in Warner Bros. films; many of these were uncredited bit parts or walk-on roles, such as in River's End, The Man Who Talked Too Much, Money and the Woman, and Always a Bride (all released in 1940). She had her first credited role in the big-budget Western film Santa Fe Trail (1940), opposite Errol Flynn and Olivia de Havilland. In the film, Peters portrayed a young woman from Boston in love with a Kansas military officer. During the press junkets to promote the film, Peters found interviews overwhelming, and later admitted: "I wasn't a good sport. I locked myself in my compartment during most of the trip."

After Santa Fe Trail, Peters had small roles in The Strawberry Blonde, Meet John Doe, Here Comes Happiness (1941), and Scattergood Pulls the Strings (all 1941), the latter of which earned her favorable reviews. She then had a lead role as an ingénue in the comedy Three Sons o' Guns (1941), followed by a dramatic part playing the girlfriend of a convict in The Big Shot (1942), opposite Richard Travis and Humphrey Bogart. She was also in shorts such as Young America Flies (1940) and Sockaroo (1941). At the urging of the studio (who initially suggested she change her name to Sharon O'Keefe), she dropped her birth name and took the stage name Susan Peters. By 1942, however, Warner Bros. chose not to renew her contract.

=== 1942–1944: Metro-Goldwyn-Mayer and critical success ===
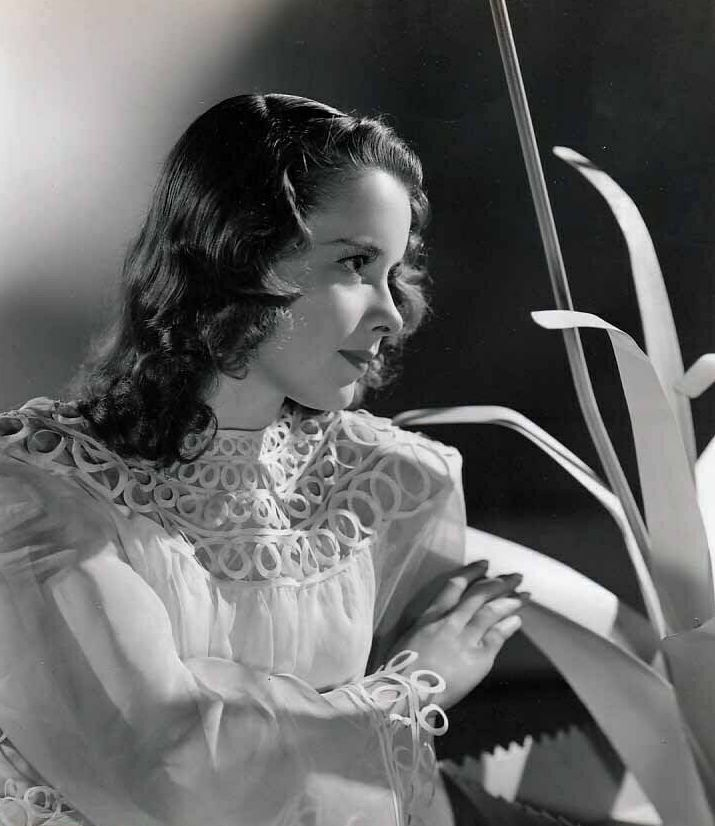
Peters photographed by Clarence Sinclair Bull promoting Tish (1942)

Several months after being dropped by Warner Bros., Peters was contacted by MGM to test for a supporting role in the film Tish (1942), a loose adaptation of a series of stories by Mary Roberts Rinehart. She won the role and also signed a contract with the studio. At the time, Peters was one of the most screen-tested actresses in Hollywood. While filming Tish, Peters met future husband, actor Richard Quine, with whom she also starred in her second film with MGM, Dr. Gillespie's New Assistant (1942), alongside Van Johnson. Quine and Peters later married on November 7, 1943, at Westwood Community Church in West Los Angeles.

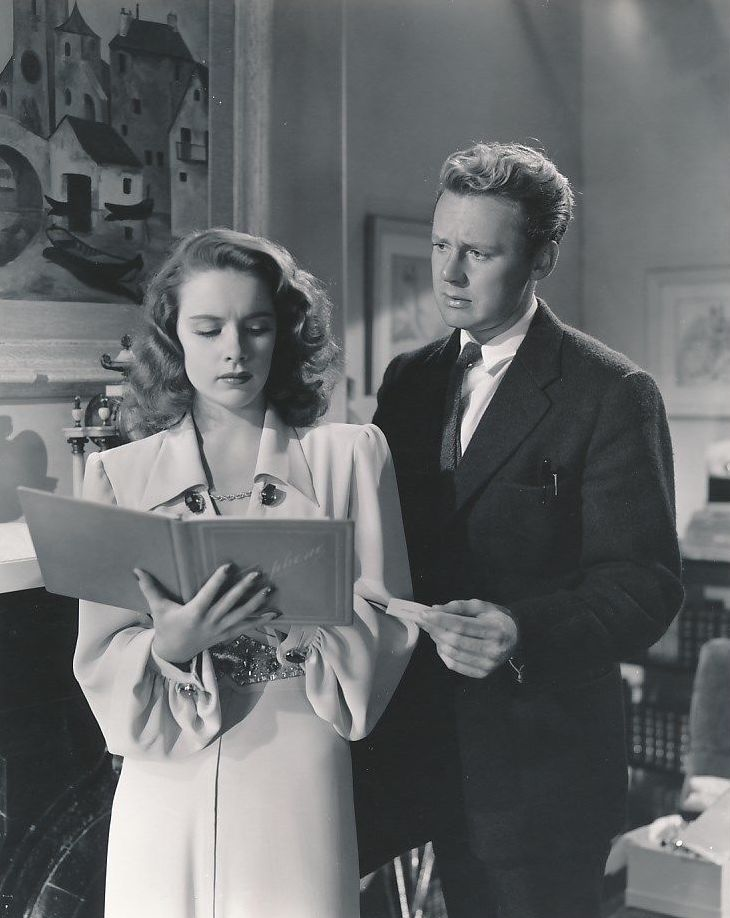
Peters and Van Johnson in Dr. Gillespie's New Assistant (1942)

After completing Andy Hardy's Double Life (1942) in which she appeared with Mickey Rooney in the very short final scene, Mervyn LeRoy cast Peters in the drama Random Harvest (also 1942), in which she portrayed a young woman who falls in love with her step-uncle. The film was one of the top 25 highest-earning films of the year, and Peters' performance garnered her critical acclaim, earning her an Academy Award nomination for Best Supporting Actress.

The success of Random Harvest led MGM to give Peters lead roles in other major pictures such as Assignment in Brittany (1943), in which she portrayed a French peasant girl. This was followed with a minor but top-billed credit in the comedy Young Ideas (1943) with Herbert Marshall and Mary Astor, directed by Jules Dassin. She was subsequently cast as the female lead in Song of Russia (1943) opposite Robert Taylor. The role earned her further excellent notices, with a review in The Hollywood Reporter noting her as "a dramatic actress of the first rank." The film however was controversial, as its portrayal of the Soviet Union was interpreted by some audiences and critics as being favorable and of a pro-Communist stance.

In early 1944, Peters was one of ten actors and actresses who were elevated from "featured player" status to the studio's official "star" category; the others included Esther Williams, Laraine Day, Kathryn Grayson, Van Johnson, Margaret O'Brien, Ginny Simms, Robert Walker, Gene Kelly, and George Murphy. An official portrait taken of MGM's contracted players during this period prominently features Peters sharing the front row with the head of the studio himself, Louis B. Mayer, and alongside such actors as James Stewart, Mickey Rooney, Margaret Sullavan, Katharine Hepburn, Hedy Lamarr, and Greer Garson. In late 1944, Peters filmed Keep Your Powder Dry, a war drama co-starring Lana Turner and Laraine Day, in which she portrayed the humble wife of a soldier.

=== 1945–1950: Injury and career decline ===
On January 1, 1945, Peters and husband Quine, along with his cousin and cousin's wife, went on a duck hunting trip in the Cuyamaca Mountains near San Diego. At one point during the trip, a 22-caliber rifle discharged accidentally, and the bullet lodged in her spine. She was rushed to Mercy Hospital, roughly 65 miles (105 km) away, and underwent emergency surgery. The injury to her spinal cord left her permanently paralyzed from the waist down, and she was required to use a wheelchair for the rest of her life. Keep Your Powder Dry premiered three months after the incident, on March 8, 1945. Peters' mother, who had maintained a bedside vigil during her stay in the hospital, died nine months later in December 1945, which left Peters even more distraught.

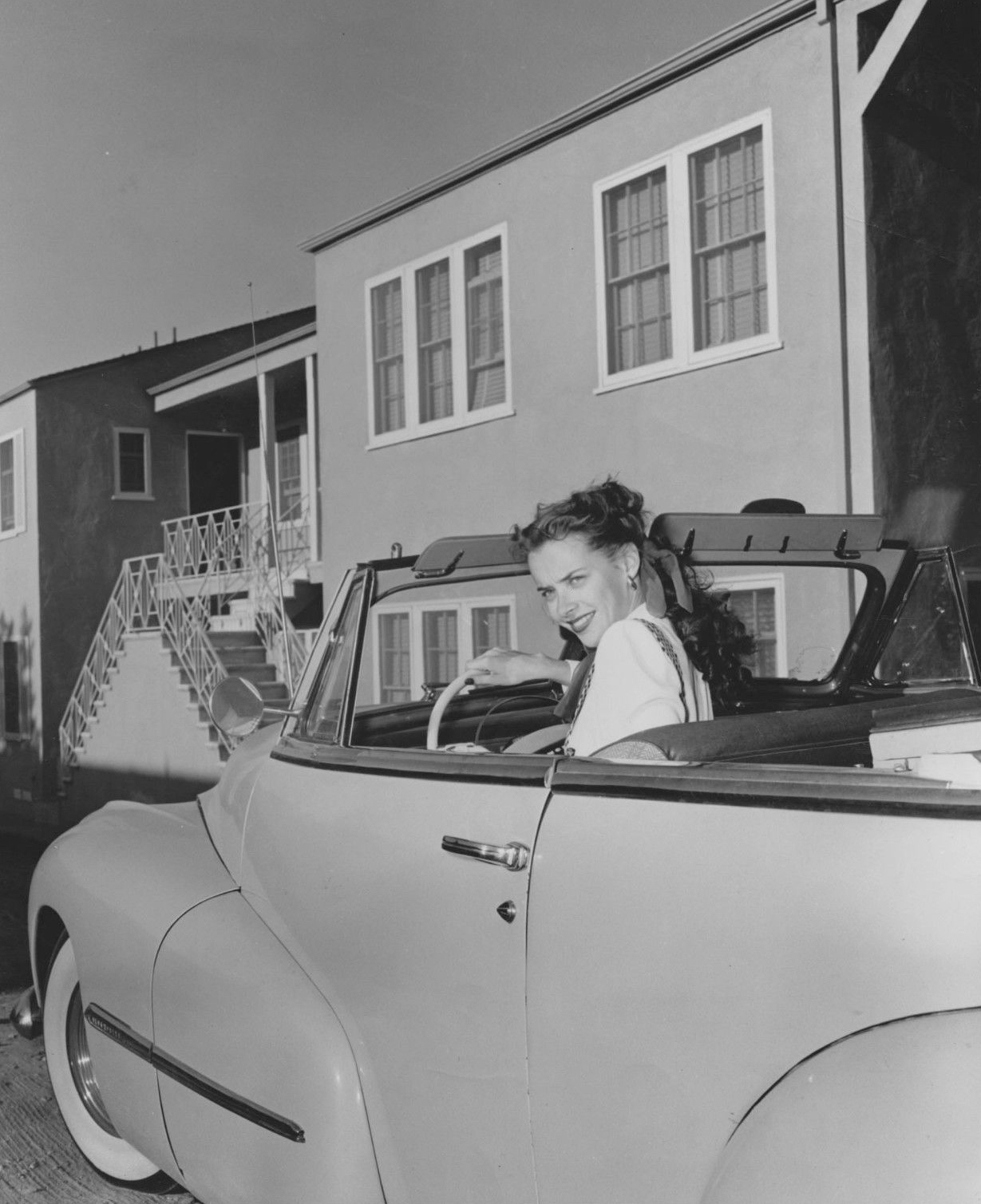
Peters driving in October 1947; her vehicle was refitted with a hand-accelerator and brakes to allow her to drive after her paralysis

MGM continued to pay Peters a $100 weekly salary and medical expenses, but, unable to find suitable projects, she subsequently left the studio. She later recalled: "Metro-Goldwyn-Mayer kept sending me Pollyanna scripts about crippled girls who were all sweetness and light, which I kept turning down. Two years after my accident, I gave up and broke my contract. I won't trade on my handicap." Among the projects offered to her were Joe Pasternak and Henry Koster's The Unfinished Dance (1947), a remake of Jean Benoît-Lévy's Ballerina. In the film, Peters was offered the role of a ballerina who receives a spinal injury that leaves her unable to perform, but she declined. Just prior to her injury, she had begun filming the drama The Outward Room. The film's producers considered completing the project with stand-ins and refitting the script to allow Peters to appear in a wheelchair, but the project was ultimately shelved.

Upon leaving MGM, Peters was approached for numerous acting jobs on radio programs. She guest-starred on a December 11, 1945, episode of Seventh Heaven opposite previous film co-star Van Johnson. In 1946, Peters and husband Quine adopted a son, Timothy Richard. The same year, Peters made her first public appearance since her accident at Ciro's in West Hollywood, attending the debut of Desi Arnaz and His Orchestra along with her close friend Lucille Ball. Ball and Arnaz urged Peters to continue seeking acting work. Actor and friend Charles Bickford suggested that Peters option the novel The Sign of the Ram by Margaret Ferguson, which centers on a disabled woman who manipulates those around her. Upon discussing the novel with her agent, Peters pitched the idea to Columbia Pictures, who were enthusiastic about making a film adaptation.

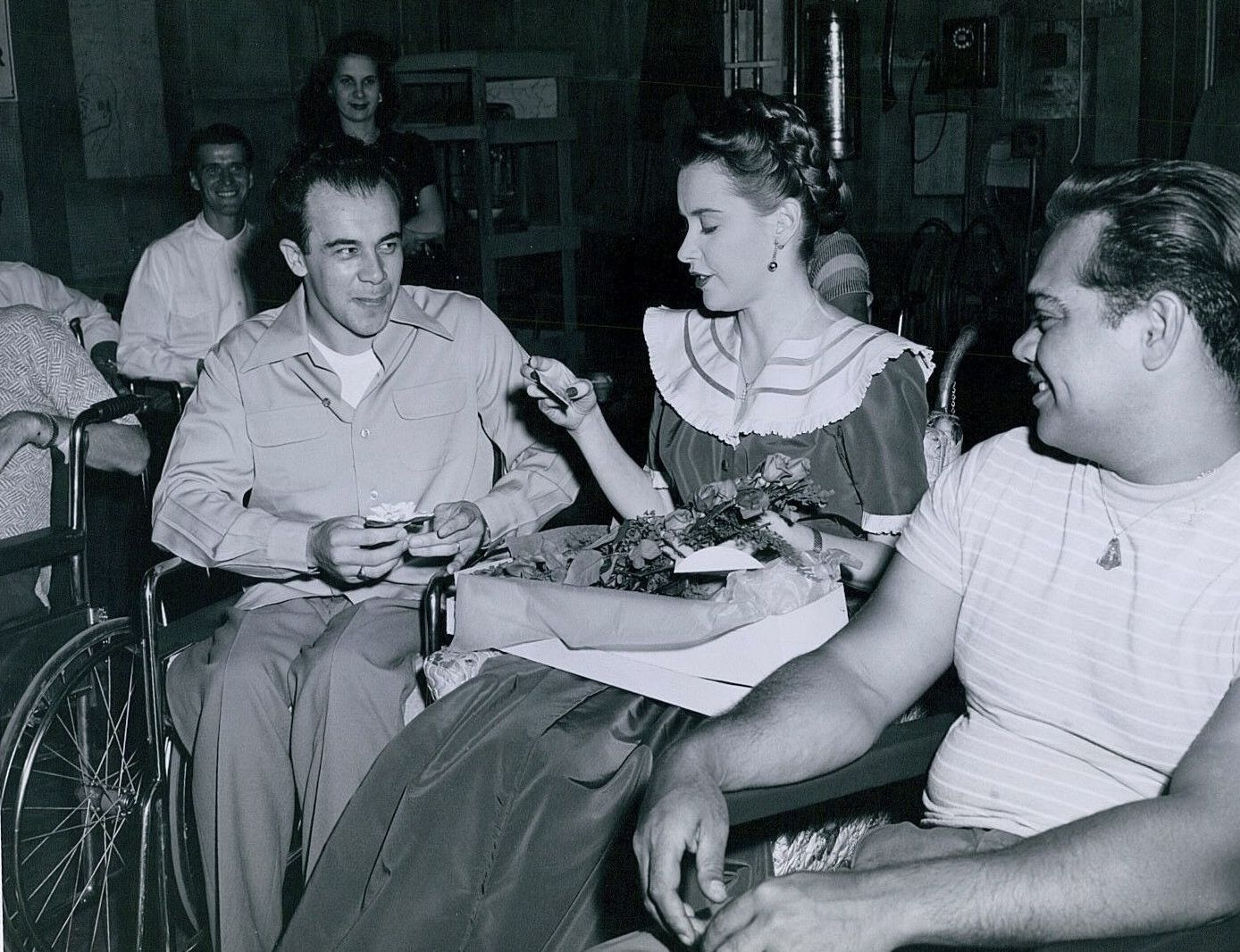
Peters being visited by the Paralyzed Veterans Association on set of The Sign of the Ram (1948)

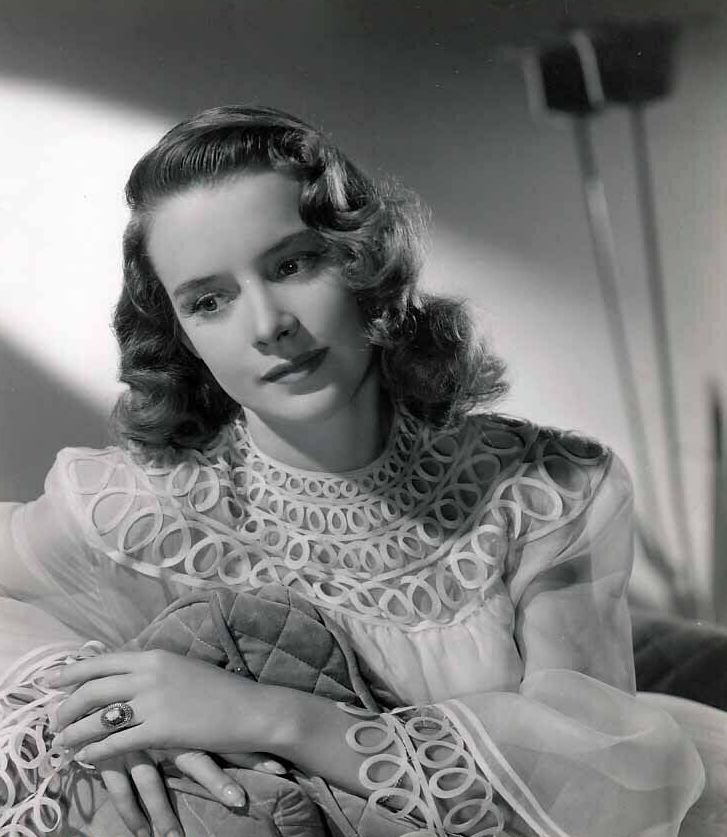
A publicity portrait of Susan Peters

Production on The Sign of the Ram began in July 1947 with director John Sturges, and Peters told reporters that she had never played a character "with the emotional range that this character has. It was a real challenge for me." The film's production was difficult, as Peters had to have Quine on set to care for her son. After production ended, Peters separated from Quine, claiming that he was cruel and would not speak to her for days at a time. Their divorce was finalized on September 10, 1948. The Sign of the Ram was released in March 1948, and critic Bosley Crowther of The New York Times gave the film an unfavorable review, writing: "The fortitude of Susan Peters in returning to the screen after a cruelly crippling accident, suffered three years ago, is worthy of a more substantial token of respect than it—and she—receives in The Sign of the Ram, a Columbia picture which came to Loew's State yesterday. And the talents of several other actors of competence who are with her in this film are deserving of fuller protection against embarrassment than any of them get." In light of her divorce and facing a lack of opportunity as an actress, Peters began having chronic depression at this time.

In 1949, she was cast as Laura in a touring stage production of The Glass Menagerie (reportedly with blessings from Tennessee Williams) which had its debut June 27, 1949, in Norwich, Connecticut. The play was slightly altered under Williams's supervision in order for Peters to be allowed to perform the part in a wheelchair. She received a standing ovation during the play's opening night, and the production toured throughout the East Coast. The following year, in 1950, she was cast in a stage production of Rudolph Besier's The Barretts of Wimpole Street, playing the disabled poet Elizabeth Barrett Browning, which earned her positive critical reception among press.

In March 1951, Peters signed onto the live NBC-TV television drama Miss Susan, in which she played an attorney who used a wheelchair. Peters shot the series live five days per week in Philadelphia from March 12 to December 28, 1951, after which it was canceled when her health began to decline.

=== 1951–1952: Health problems and death ===
After the cancellation of Miss Susan, Peters began a relationship with Robert Clark, a U.S. Army colonel, and the two announced their engagement to be married; however, Clark broke off the engagement, which sent Peters into a deeper depression. She relocated to Lemon Cove, California, to live on her brother's cattle ranch, and her health began to steadily decline. In mid-1952, Peters was admitted to a hospital in Exeter, California, to undergo a skin graft procedure, after which she returned to her brother's home and lived in seclusion. She had plans to resume another touring stage production of The Barretts of Wimpole Street the following year, but her strength had dwindled and she struggled to put on weight.

In August 1952, Peters told her physician, Dr. Manchester: "I'm getting awfully tired. I think it possibly would be better if I did die." Over the following two months, she began starving herself. Peters died on October 23, 1952, at Memorial Hospital in Visalia, California, at the age of 31. Her doctor attributed her death to a chronic kidney infection, a complication caused by her paralysis, and bronchial pneumonia. He also noted that her death was hastened by self-induced dehydration and starvation because, in the last few weeks of her life, Peters had "lost interest" in eating and drinking and had "lost the will to live". (Note: Article published in 2014 byThe Hollywood Reporter classes her death as a suicide induced by her self-starvation.)

Peters' funeral was held on October 27 in Glendale, California, after which she was buried at Forest Lawn Memorial Park next to her mother. At the time of her death, Peters' son Timothy was living with her ex-husband. Her estate was worth $6,000 (equivalent to $73,000 in 2025).

== Legacy ==
Much of the public assessment and discussion of Peters has hinged on her paralysis and its impact on her life and career: Media historian Hal Erickson considered Peters "one of Hollywood's most promising young actresses" of the 1940s, who "courageously attempted a comeback" despite her health problems. Film scholar Gene Blottner similarly praised Peters as a "brilliant actress," as did John Charles of Turner Classic Movies, who deemed her paralysis "one of the worst tragedies to affect the Hollywood acting community during the 1940s." For her contribution to motion pictures, Peters was posthumously awarded a star on the Hollywood Walk of Fame at 1601 Vine Street.

== Filmography ==
Year	Title	Role	Notes	Ref.
1940	Susan and God	Party Guest	Uncredited	
1940	River's End		Uncredited walk-on role	
1940	Sockaroo	College Coed	As Suzanne Carnahan	
1940	The Man Who Talked Too Much	Bit role	Uncredited	
1940	Young America Flies	One of Jack's girlfriends	Uncredited	
1940	Money and the Woman	Depositor	Uncredited	
1940	Santa Fe Trail	Charlotte Davis	As Suzanne Carnahan	
1941	The Strawberry Blonde	Girl	Uncredited	
1941	Here Comes Happiness	Miss Brown	Uncredited	
1941	Meet John Doe	Autograph Hound	Uncredited	
1941	Scattergood Pulls the Strings	Ruth Savage		
1941	Three Sons o' Guns	Mary Tyler		
1942	A New Romance of Celluloid: Personalities	Herself	MGM promotional short film	
1942	The Big Shot	Ruth Carter		
1942	Tish	Cora Edwards Bowzer		
1942	Dr. Gillespie's New Assistant	Mrs. Howard Allwinn Young		
1942	Random Harvest	Kitty		
1942	Andy Hardy's Double Life	Sue, Wainwright Coed on Train		
1943	Assignment in Brittany	Anne Pinot		
1943	Young Ideas	Susan Evans		
1944	Song of Russia	Nadya Stepanova		
1945	Keep Your Powder Dry	Ann "Annie" Darrison		
1945	The Outward Room		Unfinished project	
1948	The Sign of the Ram	Leah St. Aubyn		
1951	Miss Susan	Susan Martin	Television series; retitled Martinsville, U.S.A.	

== Stage credits ==
Year	Title	Role	Notes	Ref.
1949	The Glass Menagerie	Laura Wingfield	Regional touring production; debut in Norwich, Connecticut	
1950	The Barretts of Wimpole Street	Elizabeth Barrett Browning	Regional touring production	

== Accolades ==
Year	Institution	Nominated work	Category	Result	Ref.
1942	Academy Awards	Random Harvest	Best Supporting Actress	Nominated	
1942	National Board of Review	Random Harvest	Best Actress	Won	
1960	Hollywood Walk of Fame	—N/a	Star – Motion Pictures	Honored	

== See also ==
- List of actors with Hollywood Walk of Fame motion picture stars

== Sources ==
- Basinger, Jeanine (1976). Lana Turner. New York: Pyramid Publications. ISBN 978-0-515-04194-1.
- Blottner, Gene (2015). Columbia Noir: A Complete Filmography, 1940-1962. Jefferson, North Carolina: McFarland. ISBN 978-0-786-47014-3.
- Crespy, David A. (2013). Richard Barr: The Playwright's Producer. Theater in the Americas. Carbondale, Illinois: SIU Press. ISBN 978-0-809-33141-3.
- Crivello, Kirk (1988). Fallen Angels: The Lives and Untimely Deaths of Fourteen Hollywood Beauties. New York: Citadel Press. ISBN 978-0-806-51096-5.
- Erickson, Hal (2009). Encyclopedia of Television Law Shows: Factual and Fictional Series About Judges, Lawyers and the Courtroom, 1948-2008. Jefferson, North Carolina: McFarland. ISBN 978-0-786-43828-0.
- Gottesman, Ronald; Geduld, Harry M. (1972). Guidebook to Film: An Eleven-in-one Reference. London: Holt, Rinehart and Winston. ISBN 978-0-030-85292-3.
- McNeil, Alex (1991). Total Television: A Comprehensive Guide to Programming from 1948 to the Present. New York: Penguin Books. ISBN 978-0-140-15736-9.
- Nissen, Axel (2013). The Films of Agnes Moorehead. Lanham, Maryland: Scarecrow Press. ISBN 978-0-810-89137-1.
- Parish, James Robert; Bowers, Ronald L. (1973). The MGM Stock Company: The Golden Era. New Rochelle, New York: Arlington House. ISBN 978-0-870-00128-4.
- Parish, James Robert (2001). The Hollywood Book of Death: The Bizarre, Often Sordid, Passings of More than 125 American Movie and TV Idols. New York: McGraw Hill. ISBN 978-0-071-78476-4.
- Shearer, Stephen Michael (2010). Beautiful: The Life of Hedy Lamarr. New York: Macmillan. ISBN 978-1-429-90820-7.
- Troyan, Michael (2010). A Rose for Mrs. Miniver: The Life of Greer Garson. Lexington, Kentucky: University Press of Kentucky. ISBN 978-0-813-12842-9.
