= Going to Press =

- Directed by: Edward Cahn
- Written by: Hal Law; Robert A. McGowan
- Produced by: Metro-Goldwyn-Mayer
- Starring: George McFarland; Billie Thomas; Mickey Gubitosi; Billy Laughlin; Juanita Quigley; Clyde Demback; Darryl Hickman
- Cinematography: Walter Lundin
- Edited by: Leon Borgeau
- Distributed by: Metro-Goldwyn-Mayer
- Release date: March 7, 1942
- Running time: 10:44
- Country: United States
- Language: English

Going to Press is a 1942 Our Gang short comedy film directed by Edward Cahn. It was the 204th Our Gang short to be released.

== Plot ==
Determined to uncover the identity of the mysterious leader of a juvenile extortion racket, the gang sets up a crusading newspaper called The Greenpoint Press. The kids gratefully accept the help of a pleasant, well-spoken youngster named Frank, little suspecting that he is the duplicitous boss of the dreaded Gas House Gang. Only after Frank's henchmen have taken Froggy for a "ride" (a harmless but painful one) are the kids able to expose the villain and save the day.

== Cast ==
=== The Gang ===
- Mickey Gubitosi as Mickey
- George McFarland as Spanky
- Billy Laughlin as Froggy
- Billie Thomas as Buckwheat
- Juanita Quigley as Sally
- Clyde Demback as Fatty

=== Additional cast ===
- Darryl Hickman as Frank
- Freddie Chapman as Gas House Kid
- Vincent Graeff as Gas House Kid
- James Gubitosi as Gas House Kid
- Tommy Tucker as Boy standing outside of barn

== Notes ==
Juanita Quigley reprises her earlier guest character of "Sally" from 1940's The New Pupil though here Quigley is the female lead and a regular member of the gang — the only episode in the MGM era with someone other than Darla Hood or Janet Burston.

== See also ==
- Our Gang filmography
