= Keep Your Powder Dry =

1945 film by Edward Buzzell

- Directed by: Edward Buzzell
- Written by: George Bruce; Mary C. McCall, Jr.
- Produced by: George Haight
- Starring: Lana Turner; Susan Peters; Laraine Day; Agnes Moorehead; Bill Johnson; Natalie Schafer; Lee Patrick; Jess Barker; June Lockhart
- Cinematography: Ray June
- Edited by: Frank E. Hull
- Music by: David Snell
- Production company: Metro-Goldwyn-Mayer
- Distributed by: Loew's Inc.
- Release dates: March 6, 1945 (Washington, D.C.)
- Running time: 93 minutes
- Country: United States
- Language: English
- Budget: $1.3 million
- Box office: $2.7 million

Keep Your Powder Dry is a 1945 American drama film directed by Edward Buzzell and starring Lana Turner, Susan Peters, and Laraine Day, with Agnes Moorehead, Bill Johnson, Jess Barker, Lee Patrick, Natalie Schafer, and June Lockhart in supporting roles. The film focuses on three women who join the Women's Army Corps during World War II. The screenplay was written by George Bruce and Mary C. McCall, Jr.

Filmed in Florida and Iowa in late 1944, Keep Your Powder Dry premiered in Washington, D.C., on March 6, 1945. It went on to become a financial success for its studio, Metro-Goldwyn-Mayer, earning $2.7 million against its $1.3 million budget.

== Plot ==
Socialite Valerie "Val" Parks is informed that she is not eligible to claim her trust fund until she can demonstrate responsibility. In response, she decides to join the Women's Army Corps (WAC) to show she is a mature young woman. En route to the training camp in Des Moines, Iowa, she meets Ann Darrison, a housewife who chose to enlist in the WAC after her husband is deployed overseas; and Leigh Rand, the daughter of a military family. Val and Leigh, assigned to the same barracks, immediately clash, with Leigh acting bossily toward the servile Val.

Ann attempts to remediate the tensions between Val and Leigh. During training, Val challenges Leigh's assumptions about her by working intensely and excelling in her courses. Upon completing basic training, Val, Ann, and Leigh are assigned to a Motor Transport school within the WAC. Val and Leigh eventually warm to each other, and together attempt to help the self-conscious Ann boost her confidence. Ultimately, all three women are accepted into the Officer's Candidate School. Bill Barclay, a peer of Ann's husband, visits the base and has Ann record herself speaking on a disc so he can take it back to her husband overseas. At the base, Bill becomes enamored of Val, which results in jealousy from Leigh, who also finds Bill attractive. Leigh thwarts a potential date between the two by arranging Val to be assigned to duty, which angers Val.

Some time later, Val receives a telegram from her attorney inviting her to meet him at a hotel, but upon arriving finds her friend Harriet, and a drunken Junior Vanderhausen, both people from her socialite circle. Harriet, who is living on Val's income, convinces Val to sign a lease for a home in Palm Beach, Florida. Angered by the two's dismissive attitude toward her endeavors in the WAC, Val criticizes them before Junior spills his drink on her uniform. Afraid of returning to the barracks reeking of alcohol, Val asks Leigh, who is also staying in the hotel on a weekend pass, to return to the barracks and occupy her bed so she is not absent from nightly inspection. Leigh agrees, and returns to the hotel in the morning to bring Val a clean uniform. In the hotel elevator, Leigh encounters Junior, who tells her Val only joined the military to claim her inheritance.

Disgusted by what she perceives as Val's insincerity, Leigh embarks on a smear campaign against Val after she is appointed platoon commander. Two days prior to the graduation, Val finally stands up to Leigh, slapping her in the face. The women's commanding officer, Lt. Colonel Spottiswoode, subsequently informs Leigh that half of the platoon has ranked her unfit to fulfill her leadership position as she lacks empathy. Shortly after, Spottiswoode reluctantly informs Ann that her husband has been killed in combat. Ann and Leigh console one another, and Leigh admits to Ann that she has always been jealous of Val's beauty and commitment. Ann and Leigh visit Val at the hotel, and they reconcile.

Leigh and Val implore Spottiswoode for permission to remain in the WAC as enlistees despite their recent transgressions. Convinced that both women are truly remorseful, Spottiswoode relents and allows them to graduate from the Officer's Candidate School alongside Ann.

== Cast ==
- Lana Turner as Valerie "Val" Parks
- Susan Peters as Ann "Annie" Darrison
- Laraine Day as Leigh "Napoleon" Rand
- Jess Barker as Junior Vanderheusen
- Bill Johnson as Captain Bill Barclay
- Marta Linden as Captain Sanders
- June Lockhart as Sarah Swanson
- Mary Lord as WAC Mary
- Agnes Moorehead as Lieutenant Colonel Spottiswoode
- Tim Murdock as Captain Joseph Mannering
- Lee Patrick as Gladys Hopkins
- Henry O'Neill as Major General Lee Rand
- Natalie Schafer as Harriet Corwin
- Claire Rochelle as WAC Corpora

== Analysis ==
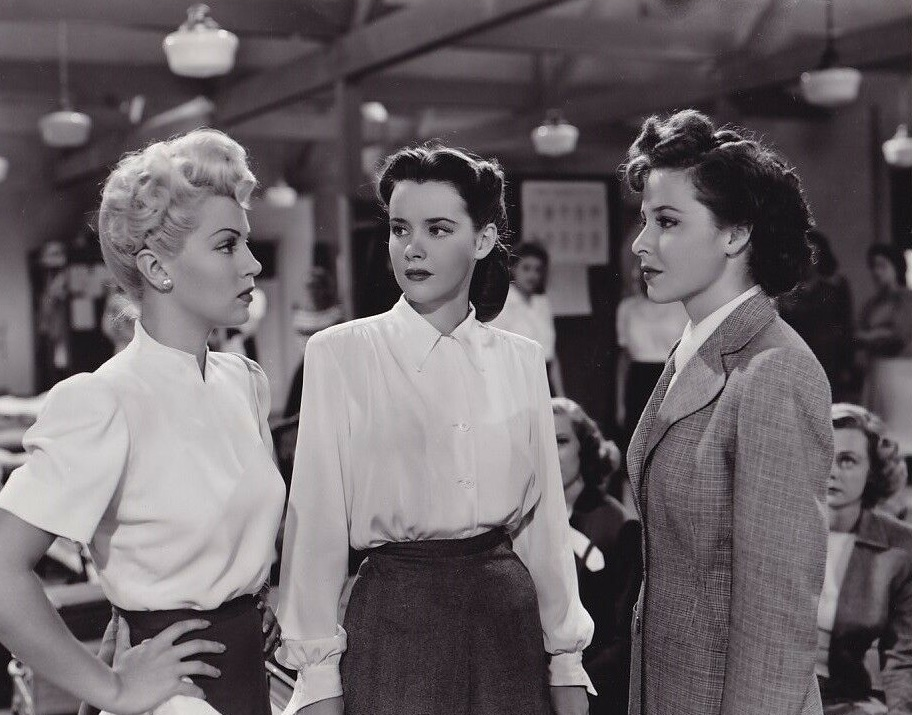
MGM's publicity still of Turner and Day in a face-to-face confrontation. Advertisements for the film promised the audience a catfight between the two women.

Partly out of a patriotic inclination, but also with an eye on potential box office receipts, Hollywood studios were eager to produce a film about women in the military, a controversial policy in the 1940s. The Army was also eager to work with Hollywood on a film that countered negative stereotypes of female soldiers. Walking a fine line, the Army demanded numerous script rewrites, avoiding anything that suggested that women joining the military made them masculine, while also avoiding scripts that made them too feminine, potentially feeding gossip regarding prostitution and sexual promiscuity.

While initial reaction to the film at a limited screening in Washington D.C. was positive, critics panned the picture when it was released nationally. Particularly upsetting to some was MGM's publicity campaign that downplayed the Women's Army Corps and instead focused on the sex appeal of its stars and traditional Hollywood tropes about female behavior. Advertisements for the film emphasized a catfight between the stars and included the images of WACs practicing judo. At the top of one advertisement was a small picture of Turner slapping Day in the film with the large tagline, “The most hilarious catfight since ‘The Women!’”.

Despite the Army's first assessment of the film as being positive for the WAC's image, officials ultimately decided against distribution overseas, saying that that the film provided an unrealistic presentation of the Women’s Army Corps and that the portrayal of the WAC and civilians on the home front were too negative to be seen abroad.

The failure of Keep Your Powder Dry was symptomatic of a larger resistance to women in the military. Public relations and recruitment for the Women’s Army Corps were always difficult and faced opposition from the American public, interests groups, and within the Army itself. Many Americans were concerned about the effects that the war was having on society. With men fighting overseas, women were entering the workforce in large numbers. While Rosie the Riveter became an iconic image of this change, in reality the majority of women worked in traditionally feminine jobs. Although the Army’s Bureau of Public Relations influenced scripts, assigned technical supervisors, and provided uniforms and equipment, they could not stop Hollywood from marketing a female-centric film in the way that they were accustomed to, by highlighting cat fights and sex appeal. In addition, the BPR was so eager to produce a film that would benefit the WAC that they allowed a subpar film to be produced over none at all. The production of Keep Your Powder Dry exemplifies this military environment of motion picture production during World War II. More importantly it allows an analysis of the difficulties faced by opinion-makers in marketing women soldiers to the American public.

Film scholar Yvonne Tasker notes that, while many war films of the mid-20th century are concerned with demonstrating women's capability in the military, Keep Your Powder Dry instead is "more preoccupied with picturing women's service as not only respectable but healthy and moral. Thus the film condenses its acknowledgment of skeptical men to a single sequence in which the recruits fix an incredulous general's new car."

== Production ==
Principal photography began August 28, 1944, and completed in November 1944. It was reported in August 1944 that cinematographer Richard Rosson shot backgrounds for the film at the Women's Army Corps training centers in Des Moines, Iowa, and Fort Oglethorpe. Sgt. Art Moore of the U.S. Army Signal Corps Photographic Unit instructed 50 dancing girls for drill scenes featured in the film.

== Release ==
Keep Your Powder Dry had its world premiere in Washington, D.C., on March 6, 1945. It subsequently premiered in New York City on March 10, 1945. It later opened regionally in such cities as Amarillo, Texas, on April 6.

=== Home media ===
The Warner Archive Collection released the film on DVD-R on August 23, 2010.

== Reception ==
=== Box office ===
According to MGM records, the film earned $1,892,000 in the US and Canada and $801,000 elsewhere resulting in a profit of $464,000.

=== Critical response ===
Reviews for the film were largely negative. The Boston Daily Globe review of the film said, “The success of ‘Keep Your Powder Dry’ at the State and Orpheum Theatres is highly problematic if it is used primarily to persuade young women of the advantage of being a WAC. Despite the eye appeal of Lana Turner and Laraine Day, one feels that the characters they portray are of the lightweight variety, and that life as a WAC must be somewhat similar to life at a boarding school for girls in their ‘teens.” Writing for the New York Times, Bosley Crowther wrote, "For this manifest little indignity, which came to Loew’s Criterion on Saturday, makes distaff members of our Army look like cats in a Hollywood boarding school."

Kate Cameron of the New York Daily News awarded the film two-and-a-half stars out of four, though she felt it was ineffective at promoting the Women's Army Corps, noting that it "makes no attempt to show in what way the girls serve their country after leaving training camp, nor does it suggest how important they may become in the matter of relieving soldiers for active duty at the front." E. B. Radcliffe of The Cincinnati Enquirer noted that "the producer has done right by the corps in the standard of pulchritude he has chosen to represent it," but criticized its believability, noting that "two of the principal character are far-fetched and right out of [a] soap opera." The San Francisco Examiner's Hortense Morton noted it as "a strictly feminine film," adding that, "while the story gets major treatment, the background of women in the Army, with its discipline, barracks life, and human elements, is shown with good purpose. The background is authentic." The Albany Times-Union reviewer described the film as "a kind of modern-day 'Three Musketeers'....As a documentary film of the WAC training at these two simulated posts, it is one of the most searching and informative pieces of publicity yet to reach the screen.

== Sources ==
- Tasker, Yvonne (2011). Soldiers' Stories: Military Women in Cinema and Television Since World War II. Duke, North Carolina: Duke University Press. ISBN 978-0-822-34847-4.
