= Whispering Footsteps =

1943 film by Howard Bretherton

- Theatrical release poster
- Directed by: Howard Bretherton
- Screenplay by: Dane Lussier; Gertrude Walker
- Story by: Gertrude Walker
- Produced by: George Blair
- Starring: John Hubbard; Rita Quigley; Joan Blair
- Cinematography: Jack A. Marta
- Edited by: Ralph Dixon
- Music by: Mort Glickman
- Production company: Republic Pictures
- Distributed by: Republic Pictures
- Release date: December 30, 1943 (United States)
- Running time: 54 minutes
- Country: United States
- Language: English

Whispering Footsteps is a 1943 American film noir crime film directed by Howard Bretherton and starring John Hubbard, Rita Quigley, and Joan Blair.

== Plot ==
A bank clerk's life becomes a nightmare because he fits the description of a maniac killer.

== Cast ==
- John Hubbard as Marcus Aurelius 'Mark' Borne
- Rita Quigley as Brook Hammond
- Joan Blair as Helene LaSalle
- Charles Halton as Harry Hammond
- Cy Kendall as Detective Brad Dolan
- Juanita Quigley as Rose Murphy
- Mary Gordon as Ma Murphy
- William Benedict as Jerry Murphy
- Matt McHugh as Cy Walsh, boarder
- Marie Blake as Sally Lukens, boarder

== Reception ==
TV Guide wrote of the film, "A compelling crime thriller which keeps one guessing until the end."
