= Three Sons o' Guns =

1941 film by Benjamin Stoloff

- Theatrical release poster
- Directed by: Benjamin Stoloff
- Screenplay by: Fred Niblo, Jr.
- Produced by: William Jacobs
- Starring: Wayne Morris; Marjorie Rambeau; Irene Rich; Tom Brown; William T. Orr; Susan Peters; Moroni Olsen
- Cinematography: Arthur L. Todd
- Edited by: Terry O. Morse
- Music by: Howard Jackson
- Production company: Warner Bros. Pictures
- Distributed by: Warner Bros. Pictures
- Release date: August 2, 1941
- Running time: 65 minutes
- Country: United States
- Language: English

Three Sons o' Guns is a 1941 American comedy film directed by Benjamin Stoloff, written by Fred Niblo, Jr., and starring Wayne Morris, Marjorie Rambeau, Irene Rich, Tom Brown, William T. Orr, Susan Peters and Moroni Olsen. It was released by Warner Bros. Pictures on August 2, 1941.

== Plot ==
Margaret Patterson was left a widow when her three sons were young and struggled a lot to bring them up with limited income. The three sons grow up to be selfish, irresponsible and can hardly keep a job. Now they are being drafted into the army and each one of them comes up with an excuse for not being drafted.

== Cast ==
- Wayne Morris as Charley Patterson
- Marjorie Rambeau as Aunt Lottie
- Irene Rich as Margaret Patterson
- Tom Brown as Eddie Patterson
- William T. Orr as Kenneth Patterson
- Susan Peters as Mary Tyler
- Moroni Olsen as Philip Talbot
- Barbara Pepper as Francie
- John Kelly as Buffalo Bill Oxenstern
- Fritz Feld as Blotievkin
- Charles Waldron as Henry Gresham
- Charles Halton as Haddock
- Florence Shirley as Mrs. Tyler
- William B. Davidson as Baxter
- Frank M. Thomas as Reynolds
- Emory Parnell as Delivery Man

== Bibliography ==
- Fetrow, Alan G. Feature Films, 1940-1949: a United States Filmography. McFarland, 1994.
