= Ride, Kelly, Ride =

1941 film by Norman Foster

- Theatrical release poster
- Directed by: Norman Foster
- Screenplay by: William Conselman Jr. Irving Cummings Jr.
- Story by: Peter B. Kyne
- Produced by: Sol M. Wurtzel
- Starring: Eugene Pallette; Marvin Stephens; Rita Quigley; Mary Healy; Richard Lane; Charles D. Brown
- Cinematography: Virgil Miller
- Edited by: Louis R. Loeffler
- Music by: Charles Maxwell
- Production company: 20th Century Fox
- Distributed by: 20th Century Fox
- Release date: February 7, 1941
- Running time: 59 minutes
- Country: United States
- Language: English

Ride, Kelly, Ride is a 1941 American sports drama film directed by Norman Foster and written by William Conselman Jr. and Irving Cummings Jr.. The film stars Eugene Pallette, Marvin Stephens, Rita Quigley, Mary Healy, Richard Lane and Charles D. Brown. The film was released on February 7, 1941, by 20th Century Fox.

== Synopsis ==
An owner of racehorses, Dan Thomas, and his trainer Duke Martin discover a young fellow called "Corn Cob" Kelly on their way west. He has a natural way with horses, so they quickly teach him to become a jockey.

As his career begins, Corn Cob befriends a fellow rider, Skeeziks O'Day, and antagonizes another, Tuffy Graves, whose rough tactics cause Corn Cob to fall from a mount and suffer a broken shoulder. While recuperating, he gets word that Dan has conspired with gangsters to fix a race. Knowing that honest trainer Bob Martin and daughter Ellen have all their money riding on the race, Corn Cob decides to ride their horse, injured shoulder notwithstanding. He wins the race, putting Dan in hot water with the crooks.

== Cast ==
- Eugene Pallette as Duke Martin
- Marvin Stephens as Corn Cob Kelly
- Rita Quigley as Ellen Martin
- Mary Healy as Entertainer
- Richard Lane as Dan Thomas
- Charles D. Brown as Bob Martin
- Chick Chandler as Knuckles
- Dorothy Peterson as Mrs. Martin
- Lee Murray as Tuffy Graves
- Frankie Burke as Skeeziks O'Day
- Cy Kendall as Louis Becker
- Hamilton MacFadden as Race Track Steward
- Spec O'Donnell as Kalinski
- Ernie Adams as Sandy
- Edwin Stanley as Steward
- Edward Earle as Judge Pine

== See also ==
- List of films about horse racing
