= Woman Against Woman =

1938 film directed by Robert B. Sinclair

- Theatrical release poster
- Directed by: Robert B. Sinclair
- Screenplay by: Edward Chodorov
- Based on: Enemy Territory; 1937 story in Pictorial Review by Margaret Culkin Banning
- Produced by: Edward Chodorov
- Starring: Herbert Marshall; Virginia Bruce; Mary Astor; Janet Beecher; Marjorie Rambeau
- Cinematography: Ray June
- Edited by: George Boemler
- Music by: William Axt
- Production company: Metro-Goldwyn-Mayer
- Distributed by: Metro-Goldwyn-Mayer
- Release date: June 24, 1938
- Running time: 60 minutes
- Country: United States
- Language: English

Woman Against Woman is a 1938 American drama film directed by Robert B. Sinclair and written by Edward Chodorov. The film stars Herbert Marshall, Virginia Bruce, Mary Astor, Janet Beecher and Marjorie Rambeau. The film was released on June 24, 1938, by Metro-Goldwyn-Mayer.

== Plot ==
Unhappy in his marriage, attorney Stephen Holland (Herbert Marshall) decides to get a divorce from his pretentious wife Cynthia (Mary Astor), despite concern over how it will affect Ellen (Juanita Quigley), their young daughter.

Cynthia sets out to make her ex-husband's life miserable. She first deceives Stephen's mother into siding with her, Mrs. Holland suggesting that Stephen let the little girl remain solely in Cynthia's custody for a while. Stephen must leave on a work-related trip to Washington, D.C., so he reluctantly agrees.

At a reception for his friend Senator Kingsley (Joseph Crehan), he meets Maris Kent (Virginia Bruce) and becomes smitten. They are soon married and move back to Stephen's hometown, but Cynthia conspires to ruin their lives any way she can, even having friends snub Maris at the local country club.

Away with her daughter at a remote inn, Cynthia schemes to make Stephen abandon his wife by pretending that their daughter Ellen is seriously ill and needs him. Stephen's wife and mother decide to accompany him to the inn, where all three discover a carefree Cynthia dancing while Ellen is perfectly fine. Cynthia is revealed to all what kind of person she is.

== Cast ==
- Herbert Marshall as Stephen Holland
- Virginia Bruce as Maris Kent
- Mary Astor as Cynthia Holland
- Janet Beecher as Mrs. Holland
- Marjorie Rambeau as Mrs. Kingsley
- Juanita Quigley as Ellen
- Zeffie Tilbury as Grandma
- Sarah Padden as Dora
- Betty Ross Clarke as Alice
- Dorothy Christy as Mrs. Morton
- Morgan Wallace as Morton
- Joseph Crehan as Senator Kingsley
