= Assignment in Brittany =

1943 film by Jack Conway

- Theatrical poster
- Directed by: Jack Conway
- Screenplay by: Anthony Veiller; William H. Wright; Howard Emmett Rogers
- Based on: Assignment in Brittany; 1942 novel by Helen MacInnes
- Starring: Jean-Pierre Aumont; Susan Peters
- Cinematography: Charles Rosher
- Edited by: Frank Sullivan
- Music by: Lennie Hayton
- Production company: Metro-Goldwyn-Mayer
- Release date: March 11, 1943 (US)
- Running time: 96 minutes
- Country: United States
- Language: English

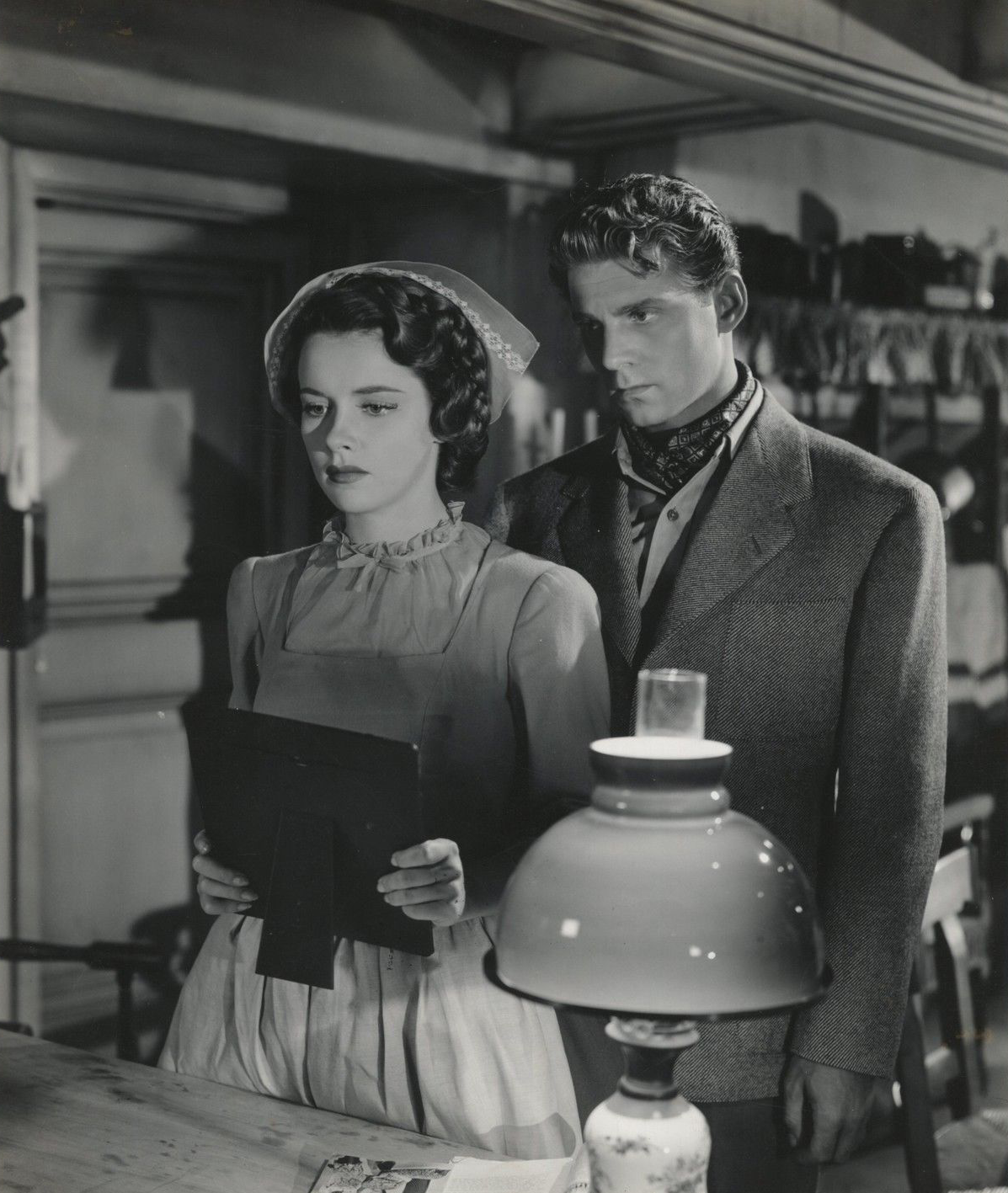
Susan Peters and Jean-Pierre Aumont

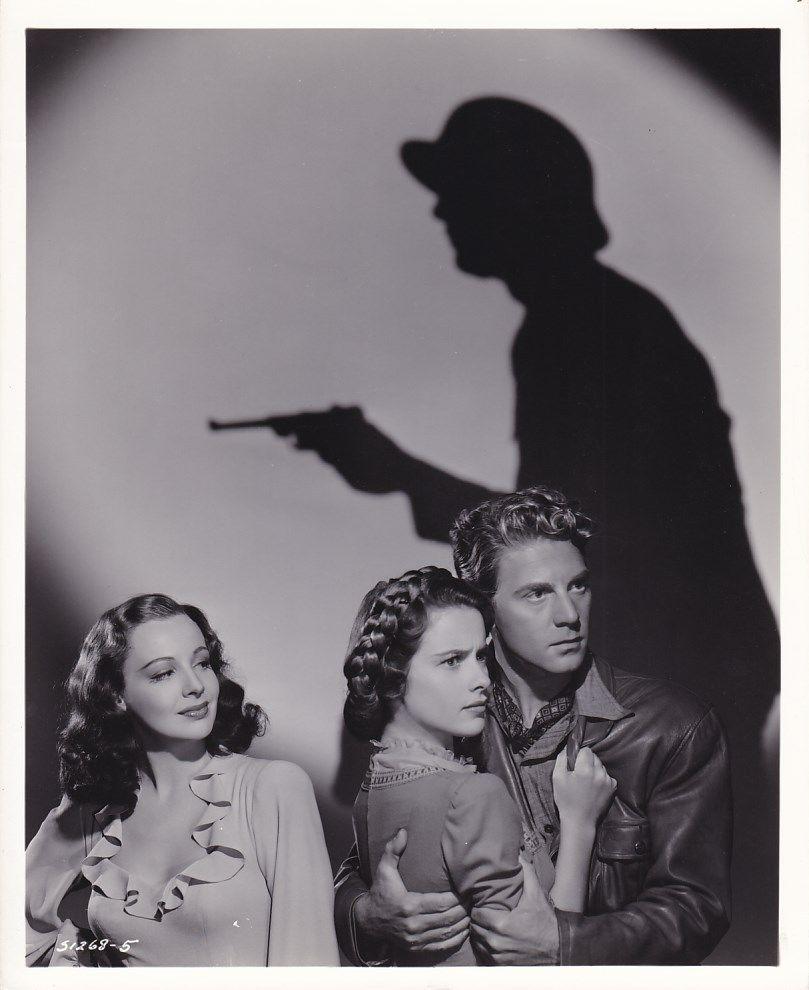
Left to right: Signe Hasso, Peters and Aumont

Assignment in Brittany is a 1943 war film directed by Jack Conway and starring French actor Jean-Pierre Aumont and Swedish actress Signe Hasso, both in their American film debuts, and American actress Susan Peters.

The film was adapted from a novel by Helen MacInnes, which was serialized in The Saturday Evening Post from May 2 to June 20, 1942, as Cross Channel, and became a bestseller when published as Assignment in Brittany. MGM bought the screen rights in February 1942.

== Plot ==
Free French Captain Pierre Matard is assigned the task of locating U-boat pens concealed somewhere on the coast of occupied France. He is chosen due to his striking resemblance to Bertrand Corlay, a suspected Nazi collaborator held by the British and a native of the area in which the pens are believed to be.

After learning all he can about Corlay, Matard is parachuted into France. On his way to the Corlay family farm, he encounters two escaped prisoners of war. He tells them to seek out his French Resistance contact, "Big Louis" Basdevant, who can help them reach England. Madame Henriette Corlay, Bertrand's mother, eventually realizes Matard is not her son, but does not give him away. Matard has better luck fooling both Anne Pinot and Elise, Bertrand's fiancee and mistress, respectively. From Elise, who consorts with and aids the Germans, he cleverly learns the pen is located in Saint Lunaire, a town on the coast.

After Basdevant is unmasked as a turncoat, Matard forces him at gunpoint to get him into the heavily guarded town. When the masquerade is uncovered, Matard shoots Basdevant and a German colonel, and escapes by jumping in the harbor. While hiding in the water, he sees a U-boat enter a hidden pen.

He gives a coded message to Plehec to transmit on his wireless, but the man is caught. Matard is also taken. Though a number of civilians, including a child, refuse to betray Matard (and are subsequently shot), Plehec's young nephew Etienne reluctantly identifies him. When Matard truthfully tells Captain Hans Holz he does not know the location of the wireless, he is tortured for days. Schoolteacher and Resistance member Jean Kerenor and other villagers manage to free him.

Hidden in a secret room beneath the church, Matard is nursed back to health by Anne. Knowing his true identity, she eventually admits she loves him, much to his delight. Etienne shows up, telling Matard that his uncle had instructed him to do whatever he had to do to protect the wireless. The boy takes Matard to it, and Matard sends the location to his superiors.

A Commando night raid is organized, led by Colonel Trane. On the way to rendezvous with the British, Matard and Kerenor stumble upon Elise and Holz in each other's arms. Matard shoots Holz when the German raises his pistol. Afterward, Kerenor, who had defended Elise from the accusation of collaboration, strangles her. After they depart, Madame Corlay hears German soldiers approach, so she grabs the pistol and allows herself to be captured to shield the others.

Matard joins some of the soldiers in the assault on the control room, where they open the pen doors. Trapped inside, they are rescued by Kerenor, who shoots the Germans from behind. Though he is killed, the others escape with few losses. British torpedo boats blow up the brightly lit submarine pens. The commandos re-embark on their boats. Aboard, Matard finds Anne and Etienne, who had found out the Germans have learned about their involvement and are forced to flee their homeland.

== Cast ==
- Jean-Pierre Aumont (credited as Pierre Aumont) as Captain Metard / Bertrand Corlay
- Susan Peters as Anne Pinot
- Richard Whorf as Kerenor
- Margaret Wycherly as Mme. Corlay
- Signe Hasso as Élise
- Reginald Owen as Colonel Trane
- John Emery as Captain Deichgräber
- George Coulouris as Captain Holz
- Sarah Padden as Albertine
- Miles Mander as Colonel Fournier
- George Brest as Henri
- Darryl Hickman as Étienne
- Alan Napier as Sam Walls
- Odette Myrtil as Louis' Sister
- Juanita Quigley as Jeannine
- William Edmunds as Plehec
- Adia Kuznetzoff as Louis Basdevant

== Production ==
The working title for Assignment in Brittany was Fire in the Night.

== Reception ==
The New York Times described the film as "an ordinary box-office adventure whose pretensions fall flat."
