= Alias Mary Dow =

1935 film by Kurt Neumann

- Directed by: Kurt Neumann
- Written by: Forrest Halsey; William Allen Johnston; Gladys Unger; Rose Franken; Arthur Caesar
- Produced by: Lou L. Ostrow
- Starring: Sally Eilers; Ray Milland; Henry O'Neill
- Cinematography: Joseph A. Valentine
- Edited by: Philip Cahn
- Music by: Oliver Wallace
- Production company: Universal Pictures
- Distributed by: Universal Pictures
- Release date: May 1, 1935
- Running time: 65 minutes
- Country: United States
- Language: English

Alias Mary Dow is a 1935 American drama film directed by Kurt Neumann and starring Sally Eilers, Ray Milland and Henry O'Neill.

The film's sets were designed by the art director Ralph Berger.

== Plot ==
In order to comfort his dying wife, a man hires a taxi-dancer to pose as their daughter who had been kidnapped as a child. However, when the woman unexpectedly recovers she is forced to maintain the deception.

== Cast ==
- Sally Eilers as Sally Gates
- Ray Milland as Peter Marshall
- Henry O'Neill as Henry Dow
- Katharine Alexander as Evelyn Dow
- Chick Chandler as Jimmie Kane
- Addison Richards as Martin
- Lola Lane as Minnie
- Clarence Muse as 'Rufe'
- Juanita Quigley as Mary Dow

== Bibliography ==
- Quinlan, David. The Film Lover's Companion: An A to Z Guide to 2,000 Stars and the Movies They Made. Carol Publishing Group, 1997.
