= A Yank at Eton =

1942 film by Norman Taurog

- Lobby card
- Directed by: Norman Taurog
- Written by: George Oppenheimer; Thomas Phipps; Lionel Houser
- Produced by: John W. Considine Jr.
- Starring: Mickey Rooney; Ian Hunter; Peter Lawford
- Cinematography: Karl Freund; Charles Lawton Jr.
- Edited by: Albert Akst
- Music by: Bronislau Kaper
- Production company: Metro-Goldwyn-Mayer
- Distributed by: Loew's Inc
- Release date: October 8, 1942
- Running time: 88 minutes
- Country: United States
- Language: English
- Budget: $751,000
- Box office: $2,677,000

A Yank at Eton is a 1942 American comedy-drama film directed by Norman Taurog for Metro-Goldwyn-Mayer and starring Mickey Rooney, Ian Hunter and Peter Lawford. It was written by George Oppenheimer, Thomas Phipps and Lionel Houser.

The film is a thematic sequel to MGM's British-made film A Yank at Oxford (1938). Edmund Gwenn, who played a school official in the earlier film, has a similar role in this film.

== Plot ==
Timothy Dennis is a cocky American youth who has to move to Britain, where he is sent to attend the elite Eton College. Ronnie Kenvil is an arrogant upperclassman who makes Timothy's life particularly difficult.

Timothy suffers through the problems of the misunderstandings arising from differences between the two countries' cultures, customs and language. At first these differences cause him confusion and anger, particularly against the traditional practices of fagging and physical hazing inflicted at Eton on the lower boys by the uppers. He finds the Etonian manners and behavior snobbish and stuffy. Eventually young Timothy settles in, stops being rebellious, and comes to realize that, beneath the different habits and views, "Yanks" and "Limeys" have basic values in common and can get along when they have to. At one point he is unjustly accused of sneaking out of his dormitory, stealing a car, and wrecking it on his way home from a night at a tavern, but in the end he proves that Ronnie instead was the culprit.

== Cast ==
- Mickey Rooney as Timothy Dennis
- Edmund Gwenn as Headmaster Justin
- Ian Hunter as Roger Carlton
- Freddie Bartholomew as Peter Carlton
- Marta Linden as Winifred Dennis Carlton
- Juanita Quigley as Jane "The Runt" Dennis
- Alan Mowbray as Mr. Duncan
- Peter Lawford as Ronnie Kenvil
- Raymond Severn as Isaac "Inky" Weeld
- Lyndon Brook as student (uncredited)
- Harry Cording as bartender (uncredited)
- Terry Kilburn as Hilspeth (uncredited)

== Production notes ==
It was filmed entirely in the United States.

The film contains Lawford's first significant Hollywood role.

The film has the Eton boating song as its theme tune (played at a faster tempo than usual), though no boating is shown in the film.

== Reception ==
=== Box office ===
According to MGM records, the film earned $1,542,000 in the US and Canada and $1,135,000 elsewhere, giving the studio a profit of $1,101,000.

=== Critical ===
The Monthly Film Bulletin wrote: "Mickey Rooney romps through his exuberant part and manages to keep up a ripple of laughs most of the time he is on the screen. Freddie Bartholomew, as his stepbrother, has less to do but that little he does well. Edmund Gwenn as the housemaster and Raymond Severn as a diminutive youth and an Earl and co-fag with Rooney to one of the Library both deserve mention for their performances, but the whole cast keep the performance on a high level."

Variety wrote: "Rooney works hard in the lead spot, providing a solid performance that, nevertheless, is unable to overcome the script which sags in a number of spots. Little Miss Quigley and youngster Raymond Severn catch attention throughout with fine performances that provide many light moments. ... Norman Taurog does the best he can with directing from the inadequate script and story material provided."
