= Straight from the Heart (1935 film) =

1935 film by Scott Beal

- British trade show advertisement
- Directed by: Scott R. Beal
- Written by: Doris Anderson
- Produced by: B.F. Zeidman
- Starring: Mary Astor; Roger Pryor; Juanita Quigley
- Cinematography: Charles J. Stumar
- Edited by: Ted J. Kent
- Music by: Clifford Vaughan; Oliver Wallace
- Production company: Universal Pictures
- Distributed by: Universal Pictures
- Release date: March 22, 1935
- Running time: 75 minutes
- Country: United States
- Language: English

Straight from the Heart is a 1935 American drama film directed by Scott R. Beal and starring Mary Astor, Roger Pryor, and Juanita Quigley.

== Partial cast ==
- Mary Astor as Marian Henshaw
- Roger Pryor as Andy MacLean
- Juanita Quigley as Maggie Haines (billed as Baby Jane)
- Carol Coombe as Mrs. Haines
- Andy Devine as Edwards
- Henry Armetta as ice cream man
- Grant Mitchell as Austin
- Virginia Hammond as Mrs. Austin
- Robert McWade as boss Tim Reglan
- Doris Lloyd as Miss Carter
- Hilda Vaughn as Miss Nellie
- Louise Carteras mother in breadline
- Willard Robertson as District Attorney
- Douglas Fowley as Speed Spelvin
- Clara Blandick as Mrs. Anderson

== Bibliography ==
- Lowe, Denise. An Encyclopedic Dictionary of Women in Early American Films: 1895-1930. Routledge, 2014.
