= Riffraff (1936 film) =

1936 film by J. Walter Ruben

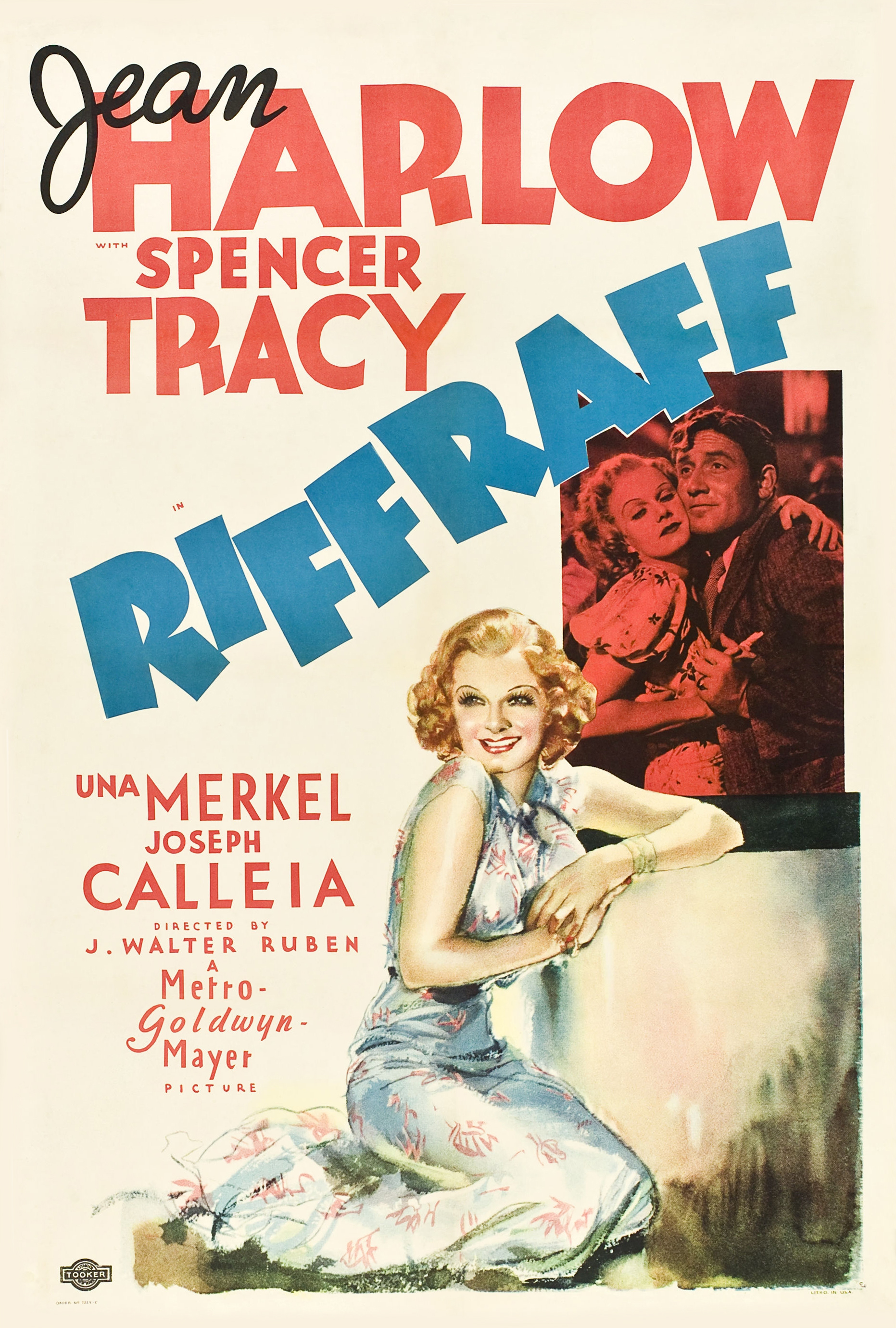
- Theatrical release poster
- Directed by: J. Walter Ruben
- Written by: George S. Kaufman; John Lee Mahin; Carey Wilson
- Screenplay by: Frances Marion; Anita Loos; H. W. Hannaford
- Produced by: Irving Thalberg
- Starring: Jean Harlow; Spencer Tracy; Una Merkel; Joseph Calleia
- Cinematography: Ray June
- Edited by: Frank Sullivan
- Music by: Edward Ward
- Production company: Metro-Goldwyn-Mayer
- Distributed by: Metro-Goldwyn-Mayer
- Release date: January 3, 1936
- Running time: 94 minutes
- Country: United States
- Language: English
- Budget: $732,000
- Box office: $1,047,000

Riffraff is a 1936 American drama film directed by J. Walter Ruben and starring Jean Harlow, Spencer Tracy and Una Merkel. The screenplay was written by Frances Marion, Anita Loos and H. W. Hannaford.

== Plot ==
Fisherman Dutch Muller organizes a strike with his fellow thugs from the fishery, including the beautiful but tough Hattie Tuttle, against the owners of a tuna cannery. Jimmie is a teenager and uncle of two younger children. They all live with Pops, Hattie and his Aunt Lil in the same small dwelling on the wharf. The rich cannery owner Nick Lewis is also trying to romance Hattie with money and gifts, but she chooses Dutch.

== Cast ==
- Jean Harlow as Harriet "Hattie"/"Hat" Tuttle
- Spencer Tracy as Rudolph "Dutch" Muller
- Una Merkel as Lil Bundt
- Joseph Calleia as Nick Lewis
- Victor Kilian as "Flytrap"
- Mickey Rooney as Jimmy Thurger
- J. Farrell MacDonald as "Brains" McCall
- William Newell as "Pete"
- Roger Imhof as "Pops" Thurger
- Juanita Quigley as Rosie Bundt
- Paul Hurst as Red Belcher
- Vince Barnett as "Lew", a fisherman
- Dorothy Appleby as Gertie, a waitress
- Judith Wood as Mabel, a waitress
- Arthur Housman as Ratsy and Bugsy
- Wade Boteler as Detective Bert Scanlon
- Helene Costello as Maizie
- Rafaela Ottiano as Matron
- Harry Cording as Joe (uncredited)
- Philo McCullough as Fisherman (uncredited)

== Production ==
The film was developed from an original story by Frances Marion as a dramatic vehicle for Jean Harlow. David Lewis had just joined MGM and was assigned to be associate producer. He wrote "the principal problem with Frances was that her dialogue was insipid: the tough guy talked tough and the girls talked like ingenues." Work was done on the script by H.W. Hanemann and Jack Ruben, then Anita Loos did a polish.

Lewis said "Although I didn’t realize it at the time, Riffraff was so right wing, so anti-union, that later I was astonished."

On the night of October 30, 1935, 40 female extras on the set, many of them elderly or in frail health, were filmed in a simulated rain sequence that included the use of a sprinkler rig, fire hoses and wind machines. Multiple extras sustained bruises, temporary blindness, and loss of consciousness, with many suffering from pneumonia as a result. The crew was found to be understaffed and lacking the necessary supplies to properly warm and dry the extras between takes.

== Reception ==
Contemporary reviews from critics were generally positive, both for the film and Harlow's new "natural" look, as she darkened her hair to what the press dubbed "brownette" before the film went into production. Frank S. Nugent of The New York Times praised the moments of "robust comedy" but lamented the serious scenes in which a "boisterous jest skids down the slopes of melodramatic routine." Variety published a positive review praising the "excellent cast" and dialogue that was "vigorous and well-written." Film Daily was also positive, calling the film a "lusty picture, full of action and comedy" with "fine performances" by Harlow and Tracy. The Milwaukee Sentinel wrote that there was "much hilarious comedy and robust action which takes away the sting of too much pathos" and that Tracy's work was an "excellent job."

John Mosher of The New Yorker wrote a negative review, regretting that the film "leaves Miss Harlow in the background for longish and rather dreary stretches ... I'd say of the picture that there is too much tuna fish, and not enough Harlow."

The film's depiction of organized labor drew some controversy. Max S. Hayes of The Cleveland Citizen attacked the film as "propaganda to prejudice the public against trade unionism."

David Lewis said he thought the film was "simplistic, although I loved Harlow, both in her work and as a person. And Tracy was excellent in a thankless part. They both helped make it a lot better than perhaps the script deserved. Thalberg... was not mad about the film... Anyway, it wasa well-made, well-acted program picture that possibly did everything Thalberg had wanted: it had shown that Jean Harlow had an acceptable dramatic flair."

== Box office ==
According to MGM records, the film earned $717,000 in the U.S. and $330,000 elsewhere, resulting in a loss of $63,000.

== Notes ==
- Lewis, David (1993). Curtis, James (ed.). The Creative Producer. Metuchen: Scarecrow Press. ISBN 0-8108-2720-4.
