= Young Ideas =

1943 film

- Film poster
- Directed by: Jules Dassin
- Written by: Ian McLellan Hunter; Bill Noble
- Produced by: Robert Sisk
- Starring: Susan Peters; Herbert Marshall; Mary Astor
- Cinematography: Charles Lawton Jr.
- Edited by: Ralph E. Winters
- Distributed by: MGM
- Release date: August 2, 1943
- Running time: 77 minutes
- Country: United States
- Language: English

Young Ideas is a 1943 American romantic comedy film directed by Jules Dassin and starring Susan Peters, Herbert Marshall and Mary Astor.

== Plot ==
Josephine Evans and Professor Michael Kingsley are in a romantic relationship, something not approved of by Evan's two children. They try to disrupt the relationship with salacious incidents taken from their mother's fiction books, presenting them as true things their mother has done, hoping Kingsley would be displeased.

== Cast ==
- Susan Peters as Susan Evans
- Herbert Marshall as Prof. Michael Kingsley
- Mary Astor as Josephine "Jo" Evans
- Elliott Reid as Jeff Evans
- Richard Carlson as Tom Farrell
- Allyn Joslyn as Adam Trent
- Dorothy Morris as Co-ed
- Frances Rafferty as Co-ed
- George Dolenz as Pepe
- Emory Parnell as Judge Canute J. Kelly
- Fred Aldrich as Peanut Vendor (uncredited)
- Charles Arnt as Station Master (uncredited)
- William Bishop as French Lieutenant (uncredited)
- Paul E. Burns as Gardener-Caretaker (uncredited)
- Budd Buster as Elderly Driver (uncredited)
- Lois Collier as Co-ed (uncredited)
- Frank Faylen as Reporter (uncredited)
- Ava Gardner as Co-ed (uncredited)
- Marilyn Harris as Co-ed (uncredited)
- Myron Healey as Student (uncredited)
- Harry Holman as Harry, Court Clerk (uncredited)
- Jewel McGowan as Jitterbug Dancer (uncredited)
- Noel Neill as Co-ed (uncredited)
- Robert Emmett O'Connor as Train Conductor (uncredited)
- Anne O'Neal as Secretary (uncredited)
- Jean Porter as Southern Co-ed (uncredited)
- Almira Sessions as Club Woman (uncredited)
