= Riot Squad (1941 film) =

1941 film

- Directed by: Edward Finney
- Written by: C.C. Coons
- Produced by: Edward Finney; Albert Herman
- Starring: Richard Cromwell; Rita Quigley; John Miljan
- Cinematography: Marcel Le Picard
- Edited by: Fred Bain
- Music by: Frank Sanucci
- Production company: Edward F. Finney Productions
- Distributed by: Monogram Pictures
- Release date: December 12, 1941
- Running time: 60 minutes
- Country: United States
- Language: English

Riot Squad is a 1941 American crime film directed by Edward Finney and starring Richard Cromwell, Rita Quigley and John Miljan.

== Plot ==
After his policeman friend is killed by a gang, a doctor agrees to work undercover by joining it.

== Cast ==
- Richard Cromwell as Dr. Tom Brandon
- Rita Quigley as Mary Davis
- John Miljan as Jim Grosso
- Mary Ruth as Betty O'Connor
- Herbert Rawlinson as Police Chief
- Mary Gordon as Mrs. McGonigle
- Donald Kerr as Herbie
- Jack C. Smith as Patrolman Dan O'Connor
- Richard Clarke as Lenny
- Noel Cravat as Little Frankie
- Arthur Space as Butch

== Bibliography ==
- Fetrow, Alan G. Feature Films, 1940-1949: a United States Filmography. McFarland, 1994.
