= Darryl Hickman =

American actor (1931–2024)

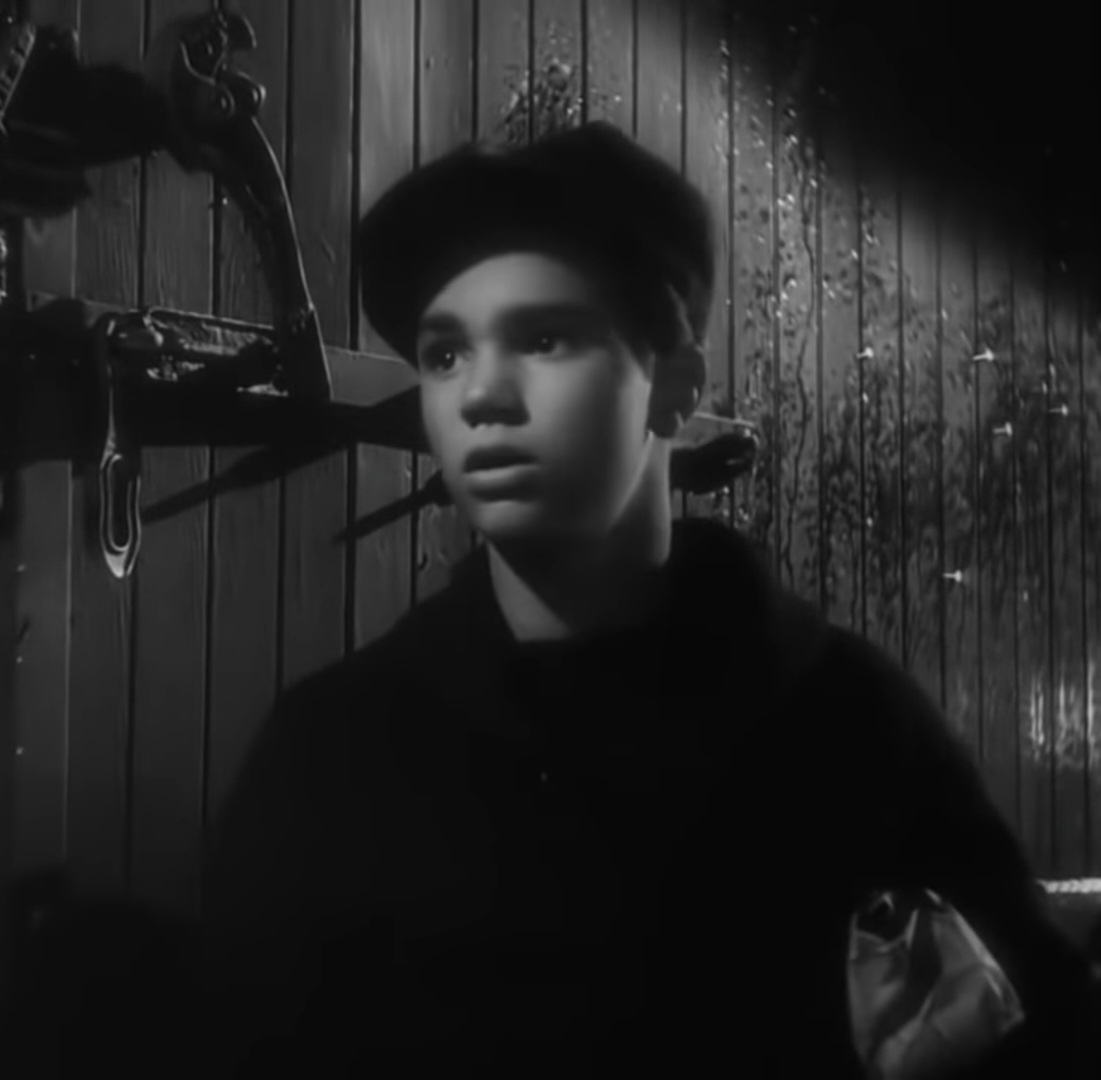
- Hickman in The Strange Love of Martha Ivers (1946)
- Born: Darryl Gerard Hickman; July 28, 1931; Hollywood, California, U.S.
- Died: May 22, 2024 (aged 92); Montecito, California, U.S.
- Occupations: Actor; screenwriter; television executive; acting coach
- Years active: 1934–1999
- Spouses: Pamela Lincoln (m. 1959; div. 1982); Lynda Farmer Hickman
- Children: 2
- Relatives: Dwayne Hickman (brother)

Darryl Gerard Hickman (July 28, 1931 – May 22, 2024) was an American actor, screenwriter, television executive, and acting coach. He started his career as a child actor in the Golden Age of Hollywood and appeared in numerous television serials as an adult, including several episodes of the CBS series The Nanny. He appeared in films such as The Grapes of Wrath (1940) and Leave Her to Heaven (1945).

He was the older brother of Dwayne Hickman, an actor, television executive, producer and director.

== Career ==
=== Child actor in the 1930s and 1940s ===
In the mid-1930s, Darryl was discovered by a dance-school director, and subsequently became a student there. The following year, Hollywood studio Paramount signed a contract with the child actor. His first film role was as Ronald Colman's son in The Prisoner of Zenda in 1937. He attended Paramount's school in California and his classmates included Gene Nelson and Jackie Cooper.

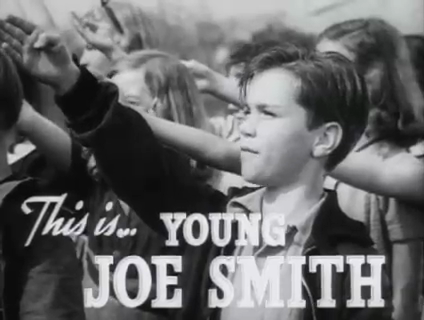
Hickman in Joe Smith, American (1942)

In preparation for the 1939 Bing Crosby movie The Star Maker, Paramount casting agents, led by Leroy Prinz, interviewed more than a thousand children. Hickman won one of the parts in the film. Pleased with Hickman's performance, Crosby notified his older brother and talent agent Everett Crosby of the young actor. After this, he went on to appear in multiple motion pictures throughout the 1930s and 1940s in a wide array of genres. A busy performer, he sometimes worked on different films simultaneously.

In 1939, Hickman was cast in 20th Century Fox's film adaption of John Steinbeck's best-selling novel from 1939, The Grapes of Wrath, starring Henry Fonda and directed by John Ford. He portrayed Winfield Joad, the youngest member of a family trying to cope with the hardships of the Great Depression. The film was a critical and commercial success, with Ford winning an Academy Award for Best Director, while actress Jane Darwell won for Best Supporting Actress. In 1941, Hickman played a reform-school juvenile delinquent in Men of Boys Town, "almost running away [with the movie] right under [co-star] Mickey Rooney's nose", said one review. Another notable role during this time included the wartime melodrama The Human Comedy, where he played a mentally slow child. Hickman made a featured appearance as Frank in the 1942 Our Gang comedy short Going to Press. In 1944, he again played the bad-boy antagonist, cast opposite Jimmy Lydon's goody two-shoes character in the film Henry Aldrich, Boy Scout.

In 1946, he played the younger version of Van Heflin's character Sam Masterson in the film noir The Strange Love of Martha Ivers. To make it seem credible that Hickman looked like a young Van Heflin, the latter provided a picture of himself as a teenager to makeup artist Wally Westmore. In this period, he also acted alongside Gene Tierney and Cornel Wilde in the 1945 film Leave Her to Heaven. Being the sole survivor among the cast, he provided extra commentary in the DVD release of the movie. His experience of working with Tierney was mixed; he considered her to have been aloof and not to have given her best performance, although it led to a nomination for the Academy Award for Best Actress.

The year after the release of Leave Her to Heaven, Hickman was lauded by a newspaper as "one of Hollywood's top juveniles". Hickman later became critical of child acting, lamenting how the profession for young actors deprives them of a real childhood. He opted to get therapy for several years to come to terms with his past.

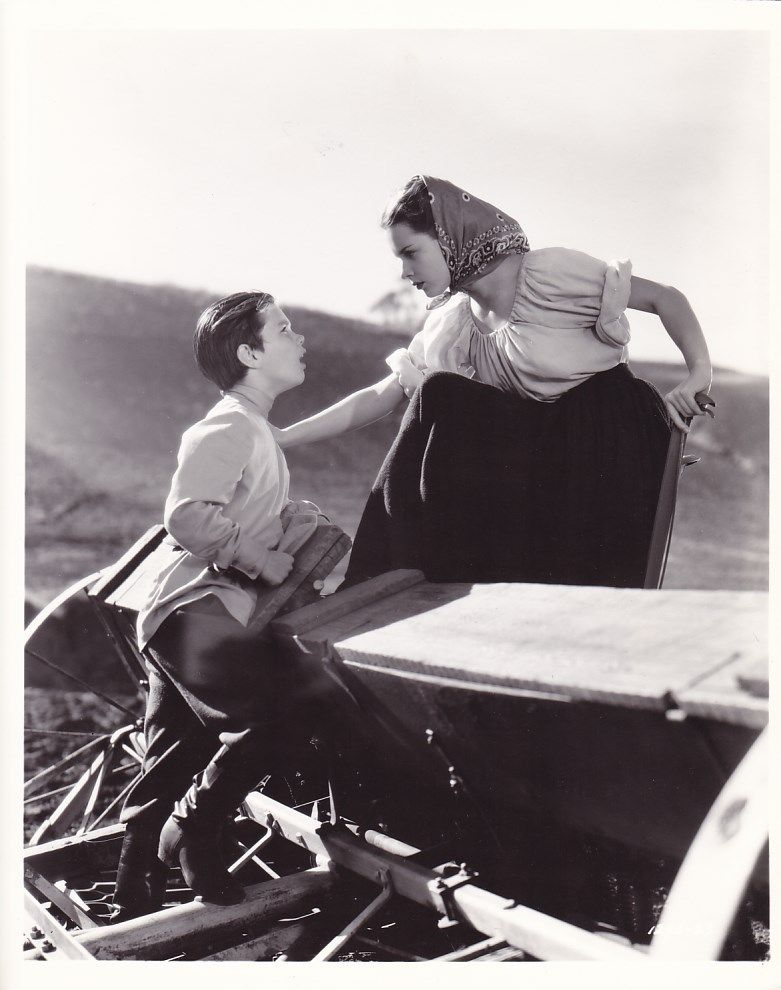
Hickman with Susan Peters in Song of Russia (1944)

=== Adult career ===
Hickman graduated from Cathedral High School in Los Angeles in 1948 (his brother Dwayne graduated from the same school in 1952). Finding it hard to adjust to adulthood after being in the limelight for most of his childhood, he retired from show business to enter a monastery in 1951 as a Passionist monk. He returned to Hollywood around one month later. He continued acting, but with fewer roles than he had at the peak of his career. He appeared in Season 3, Episode 45 (1952) of The Lone Ranger as "The Midnight Rider" (Bob Jessup).

One of his most notable roles during this time was as Al in the 1956 film Tea and Sympathy. He also began acting for the first time in the then-new entertainment medium of television. The switch did not always turn-out successfully, for many shows were cancelled for various reasons in the early years of television. Hickman's ongoing efforts to reinvigorate his acting career were interrupted for two years while he served in the U.S. Army from 1954 to 1956.

In 1959 and 1960, Hickman appeared on younger brother Dwayne Hickman's CBS sitcom The Many Loves of Dobie Gillis, playing Dobie's older brother Davey in three episodes: "The Right Triangle" (1959), "Deck the Halls" (1959), and "Where There's a Will" (1960). Also in 1959 he starred twice in the TV Western Gunsmoke; as "Andy Hill" in the episode "The Choice" (S4E34) and as "Danny" in the episode "Target" (S5E1). In 1961, Hickman starred in a short-lived TV series The Americans.

In 1957, Hickman played murderer Steve Harris in the Perry Mason episode "The Case of the Sleepwalker's Niece". He appeared in two episodes of The Untouchables, "You Can't Pick the Number" and "Pressure". Aside from film and television, Hickman also starred in the Broadway production of Pulitzer Prize-winning play How to Succeed in Business Without Really Trying in 1963, substituting for star Robert Morse, and in the touring company of the musical George M in 1969. In 1976, after a 17-year hiatus from movies, Hickman had a minor role as Bill Herron in Network.

=== Television executive and acting coach ===
Hickman became a television executive, producer, and occasional screenwriter, mainly working in New York City. He wrote the scripts for several 1961 episodes of The Loretta Young Show. In the early 1970s, Hickman was associate producer of the long-running soap opera Love of Life. He was also one of the producers of A Year at the Top with Norman Lear in 1977. During the production of the pilot episode for A Year at the Top, he reunited with guest-star Mickey Rooney, with whom he had acted in the Boys Town sequel Men of Boys Town in 1941.

Hickman's book about acting techniques, The Unconscious Actor: Out of Control, in Full Command, was published in April 2007. In it, he explains how his approach to acting evolved through his interactions with the various actors and directors with whom he worked over the years. One of his most important influences came from working with Spencer Tracy and George Cukor in the 1942 movie Keeper of the Flame. In another book written by James Curtis and published in 2011, Spencer Tracy: A Biography, Hickman's admiration for Tracy and Cukor is again documented. He praises the two men's patience in that biography, as well as their ability to give due attention to inexperienced actors such as himself. Earlier, in a 2002 interview, Hickman stated that the current generation of young Hollywood actors was talented, but lacked the proper coaching and ambition.

== Personal life and death ==
Hickman was born in Hollywood, California, on July 28, 1931, to Milton and Katherine (née Ostertag) Hickman. His father sold insurance and his mother was a housewife. His maternal grandfather, Louis Henry Ostertag, was a U.S. Navy seaman on Commodore George Dewey's flagship, the cruiser USS Olympia (C-6).

Hickman married actress Pamela Lincoln, with whom he had acted in the movie The Tingler, on November 28, 1959. The couple, who had two sons, divorced in 1982. Their younger son, Justin, died by suicide at the age of 19 in 1985.

Hickman died on May 22, 2024, at the age of 92.

== Selected filmography ==
=== Features ===
Year	Title	Role	Notes
1937	The Prisoner of Zenda	Bit Role	Uncredited
1938	If I Were King	Child	Uncredited
1939	The Star Maker	"Boots"	
1940	Emergency Squad	Bob	Uncredited
1940	The Grapes of Wrath	Winfield Joad	
1940	The Farmer's Daughter	Billy Bingham	Uncredited
1940	The Way of All Flesh	Victor As A boy	
1940	Prairie Law	Homesteader's Son	Uncredited
1940	Untamed	Mickey Moriarty	
1940	Mystery Sea Raider	Benny	Uncredited
1940	Young People	Tommy	
1941	Sign of the Wolf	Billy Freeman	
1941	Men of Boys Town	"Flip"	
1941	Mob Town	Butch "Shrimp" Malone	
1941	Glamour Boy	Billy Doran	
1942	Young America	David Engstrom	
1942	Joe Smith, American	Johnny Smith	
1942	Jackass Mail	Tommy Gargan	
1942	Northwest Rangers	'Blackie' As A Boy	
1943	Keeper of the Flame	Jeb Rickards	
1943	The Human Comedy	Lionel	
1943	Assignment in Brittany	Etienne	
1944	Henry Aldrich, Boy Scout	Peter Kent	
1944	Song of Russia	Peter Bulganov	
1944	And Now Tomorrow	Joe	Uncredited
1944	Meet Me in St. Louis	Johnny Tevis	Uncredited
1945	Salty O'Rourke	"Sneezer"	
1945	Captain Eddie	Eddie Rickenbacker As A Boy	
1945	Rhapsody in Blue	Ira Gershwin As A Boy	
1945	Kiss and Tell	Raymond Pringle	
1945	Leave Her to Heaven	Danny Harland	
1946	Two Years Before the Mast	Sam Hooper	
1946	The Strange Love of Martha Ivers	Young Sam Masterson	
1946	Boys' Ranch	Hank	
1947	The Devil on Wheels	Micky Clark	
1947	Black Gold	Schoolboy	
1947	Dangerous Years	Leo Emerson	
1948	The Sainted Sisters	Jud Tewilliger	
1948	Fighting Father Dunne	Matt Davis	
1948	Big Town Scandal	"Skinny" Peters	
1949	Alias Nick Beal	Larry Price	
1949	The Set-Up	Shanley	
1949	Any Number Can Play	Paul Enley Kyng	
1949	A Kiss for Corliss	Dexter Franklin	
1950	The Happy Years	"Tough" McCarty	
1951	Lightning Strikes Twice	"String"	
1951	Criminal Lawyer	Bill Webber	Uncredited
1951	Submarine Command	Jack Wheelwright	
1953	Destination Gobi	Wilbur "Coney" Cohen	
1953	Island in the Sky	Swanson	
1953	Sea of Lost Ships	Senior Cadet Pete Bennett	
1954	Southwest Passage	Jeb	
1954	Prisoner of War	Merton Tollivar	
1954	Ricochet Romance	Dave King	
1955	Many Rivers to Cross	Miles Henderson	Uncredited
1956	Tea and Sympathy	Al	
1957	The Iron Sheriff	Benjamin "Benjie" Galt	
1957	The Persuader	Toby Bonham	
1959	The Tingler	David Morris	
1959	Time Element	Ensign Janoski	TV series
1976	Network	Bill Herron	
1981	Looker	Dr. Jim Belfield	
1981	Sharky's Machine	Detective Smiley	
1982	The Tragedy of King Lear	Earl of Kent	
1986	GoBots: Battle of the Rock Lords	Marbles / Hornet	Voice

=== Television ===
Title	Year	Role	Notes
Sneak Preview	1956		Season 1 Episode 5: "The Way Back"
Alfred Hitchcock Presents	1957	Jackie Blake	Season 3 Episode 4: "Heart of Gold"
Westinghouse Desilu Playhouse	1958	Ensign Janoski	Season 1 Episode 6: "The Time Element (Westinghouse Desilu Playhouse)"
Wanted: Dead or Alive	1959	Damon Ring, Jr.	Season 1 Episode 18: "Rope Law"
Gunsmoke	1959	Andy Hill	S4:E34, "The Choice"
Gunsmoke	1959	Danny	S5:E1, "Target"
The Many Loves of Dobie Gillis	1959–1960	Davey Gillis	Episode: "The Right Triangle"
The Many Loves of Dobie Gillis	1959–1960	Davey Gillis	Episode: "Deck the Halls"
The Many Loves of Dobie Gillis	1959–1960	Davey Gillis	Episode: "Where There's a Will"
Rawhide	1961	Andy Miller	S3:E18, "Incident of the Running Iron"
The Untouchables	1959-1962	Phil Morrisey	S1:E11, "You Can't Pick the Number"
The Untouchables	1959-1962	Danny Madikoff	S3:E26, "Pressure"
Good Old Days	1966	Rok	unsold sitcom pilot
Maude	1977	Andy	Season 6, Episode 2: "Phillip and Sam"
The Nanny	1997–1999		4 episodes.

=== Short films ===
- Coffins on Wheels (1941) – Billy Phillips
- Heart Burn (1942) – Nephew
- Going to Press (1942) – Frank
- Boogie Woogie (1945) – Junior Stumplefinger

== Bibliography ==
- Holmstrom, John. The Moving Picture Boy: An International Encyclopaedia from 1895 to 1995, Norwich, Michael Russell, 1996, pp. 169–170.
- Best, Marc. Those Endearing Young Charms: Child Performers of the Screen, South Brunswick and New York: Barnes & Co., 1971, pp. 105–110.
