= Juanita Quigley =

American actress (1931–2017)

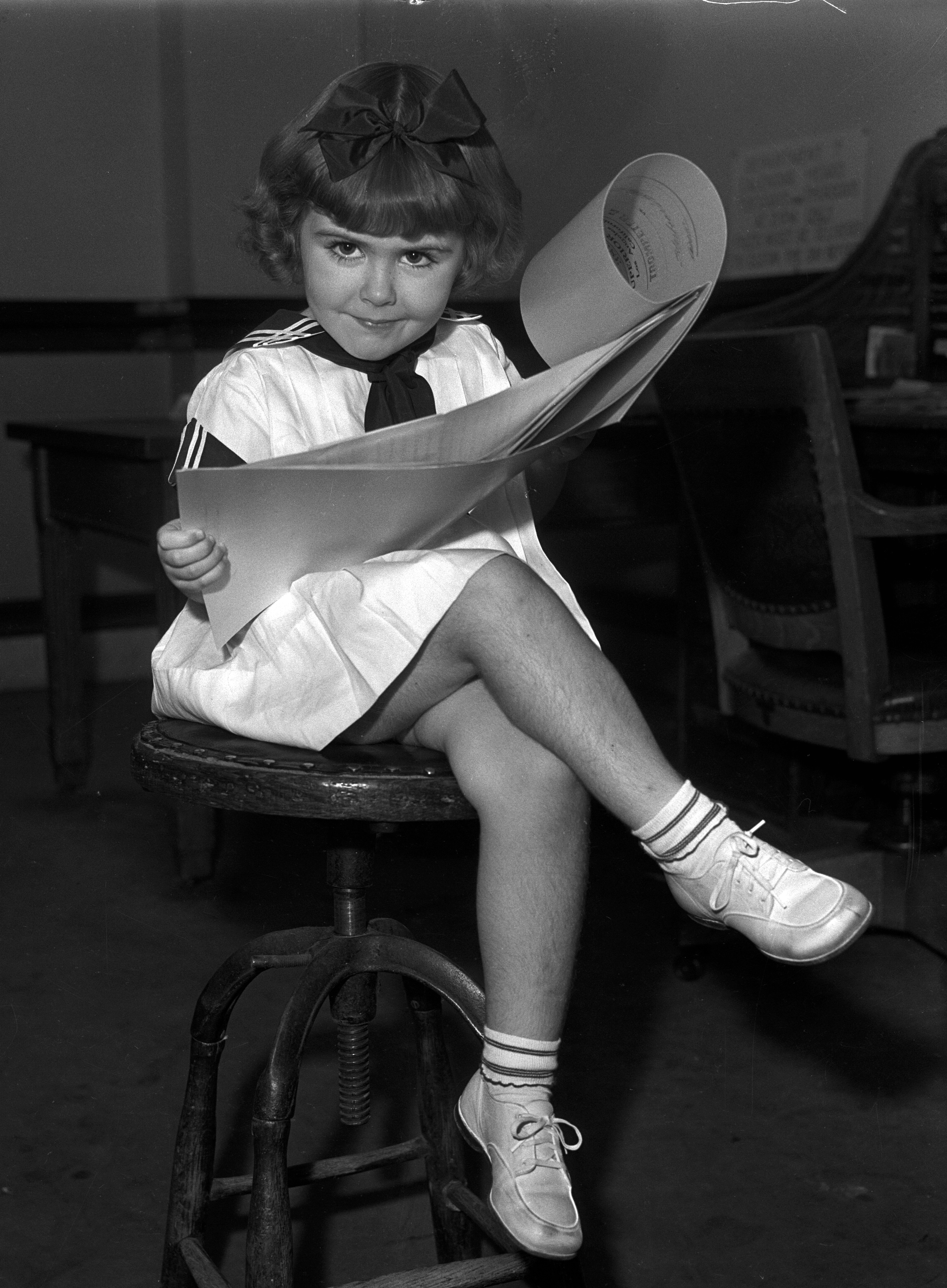
- Quigley at age 4
- Born: June 24, 1931; Los Angeles, California, U.S.
- Died: October 29, 2017 (aged 86); Sudbury, Massachusetts, U.S.
- Other name: Sister Quentin Rita
- Occupations: Actress; Religious sister
- Years active: 1934–1950 (nun 1951–1964)
- Spouse: Dr. Donald Robert Schultz (m. 1964; died 2012)
- Children: 2

Juanita Quigley (June 24, 1931 – October 29, 2017) was an American child actress in motion pictures of the 1930s and 1940s. She had a sister, Rita Quigley, who was also a child actress.

== Career ==
Juanita Quigley was billed as "Baby Jane" in several early roles. Her screen debut was as Claudette Colbert's three-year-old daughter in Imitation of Life (1934). She went on to play featured parts in several films, including The Man Who Reclaimed His Head (1934) and was Jean Harlow's niece in Riffraff (1936). Quigley became a familiar face to moviegoers of the era, but major roles for children so young were few and she often played bits as well as featured roles. She was one of the most popular child stars of her day, and was Universal Pictures' youngest star in 1934.

Quigley was briefly involved in the Our Gang film series. In 1940, she was the guest-starring lead in The New Pupil when cast as Sally, who briefly takes "Alfalfa" (played by Carl Switzer) away from Darla Hood. Two years later, she reprised the character in Going to Press (1942), the only time in the MGM era where the female lead was played by someone other than Darla Hood (who had recently left the series) or Janet Burston.

Quigley acted alongside her older sister, Rita Quigley, in Whispering Footsteps (1943). Her last major role was in National Velvet (1944), in which she played Elizabeth Taylor's sister.

== Later career ==
Quigley made only a handful of small appearances after National Velvet, her last being in 1950. At the age of 20, in August 1951, she became a Catholic religious sister, Sister Quentin Rita in the order of the Daughters of Mary and Joseph, teaching at Precious Blood Catholic School. After several years in her convent, she left the vocation and married Dr. Donald Robert Schultz in 1964. The couple had two children, Erik and Marta, before his death in 2012.

Inaccurate documentation exists that Juanita made an uncredited appearance as an extra in the locally filmed Porky's II: The Next Day.

Juanita Quigley died in Sudbury, Massachusetts, on 29 October 2017, aged 86. She and her husband Donald R. Schultz (1927–2012) are buried at the National Memorial Cemetery of Arizona in Phoenix.

== Filmography ==
Year	Title	Role	Notes
1934	In Love with Life	Little Girl with serving tray	Uncredited
1934	We're Rich Again	Child with nanny	Uncredited
1934	Have a Heart	Rosy	Uncredited
1934	Imitation of Life	Baby Jessie Pullman	
1934	The Man Who Reclaimed His Head	Linette Verin	
1935	Straight from the Heart	Maggie Haines	
1935	Alias Mary Dow	Mary Dow	
1936	Riffraff	Rosie	
1936	Absolute Quiet	Young girl (in trailer only)	Uncredited
1936	The Devil-Doll	Marguerite Coulvet	
1936	Born to Dance	Sally Saks	
1938	Hawaii Calls	Doris Milburn	
1938	The Devil's Party	Helen McCoy, as a child	Uncredited
1938	You and Me	Nasty little girl	Uncredited
1938	Woman Against Woman	Ellen	
1938	Having Wonderful Time	Mabel	
1938	Men with Wings	Patricia Falconer, aged 6	Uncredited
1938	That Certain Age	The pest	
1939	The Family Next Door	Susan Pierce	
1939	Code of the Streets	Cynthia	
1940	Oh Johnny, How You Can Love	Junior	
1940	The Blue Bird	Child	
1940	The New Pupil	Sally	Short
1941	Bachelor Daddy	Girl with pigtails at movie	
1941	Paper Bullets	Rita, as a child	Uncredited
1942	The Vanishing Virginian	Caroline Yancey	
1942	Going to Press	Sally	Short
1942	A Yank at Eton	Jane Dennis	
1943	Assignment in Brittany	Jeannine	
1943	Happy Land	Sally Pierce	Uncredited
1943	Whispering Footsteps	Rose Murphy	
1944	The Lady and the Monster	Mary Lou	
1944	National Velvet	Malvolia Brown	
1948	Luxury Liner	Jean	Uncredited
1950	Mystery Street	Daughter	Uncredited
1983	Porky's II: The Next Day	Woman at Rally	(final film role)

== Bibliography ==
- Willson, Dixie (1935). Little Hollywood Stars. Akron, OH, and New York: Saalfield Pub. Co.
