= The New Pupil =

- Directed by: Edward Cahn
- Written by: Hal Law; Robert A. McGowan
- Produced by: Jack Chertok; Richard Goldstone for MGM
- Cinematography: Clyde DeVinna
- Edited by: Adrienne Fazan
- Distributed by: MGM
- Release date: April 27, 1940
- Running time: 10:50
- Country: United States
- Language: English

The New Pupil is a 1940 Our Gang short comedy film directed by Edward Cahn. It was the 190th Our Gang short to be released.

== Plot ==
Sally is a new student at the school that the gang goes to. Upon Sally's arrival, Alfalfa and Spanky literally fall over each other trying to get her attention, leaving the gang's traditional sweetheart Darla in the lurch. But when it turns out that Sally cannot stand either one of the boys, she and Darla cook up a scheme to dampen their romantic aspirations.

== Notes and reception ==
- This film was released before Bubbling Troubles but produced after.
- The New Pupil marked the debut of Billy Laughlin who would play the character "Froggy". He is named "Harold" in this film.
- This marked the final appearance of Harold "Slim" Switzer. At 14 years of age, he was the oldest member of the cast.

== Cast ==
=== The Gang ===
- Darla Hood as Darla Hood
- George McFarland as Spanky
- Carl Switzer as Alfalfa
- Billie Thomas as Buckwheat
- Mickey Gubitosi as Mickey

=== Additional cast ===
- Juanita Quigley as Sally Stevens
- Billy Laughlin as Harold
- Patsy Currier as Darla's friend
- May McAvoy as Sally's mother
- Anne O'Neal as Teacher
- Joe "Corky" Geil as Classroom extra
- Giovanna Gubitosi as Classroom extra
- Paul Hilton as Classroom extra
- Darwood Kaye as Classroom extra
- Tommy McFarland as Classroom extra
- Harold Switzer as Classroom extra

== See also ==
- Our Gang filmography
