= Marta Linden =

Swedish-American actress (1903–1990)

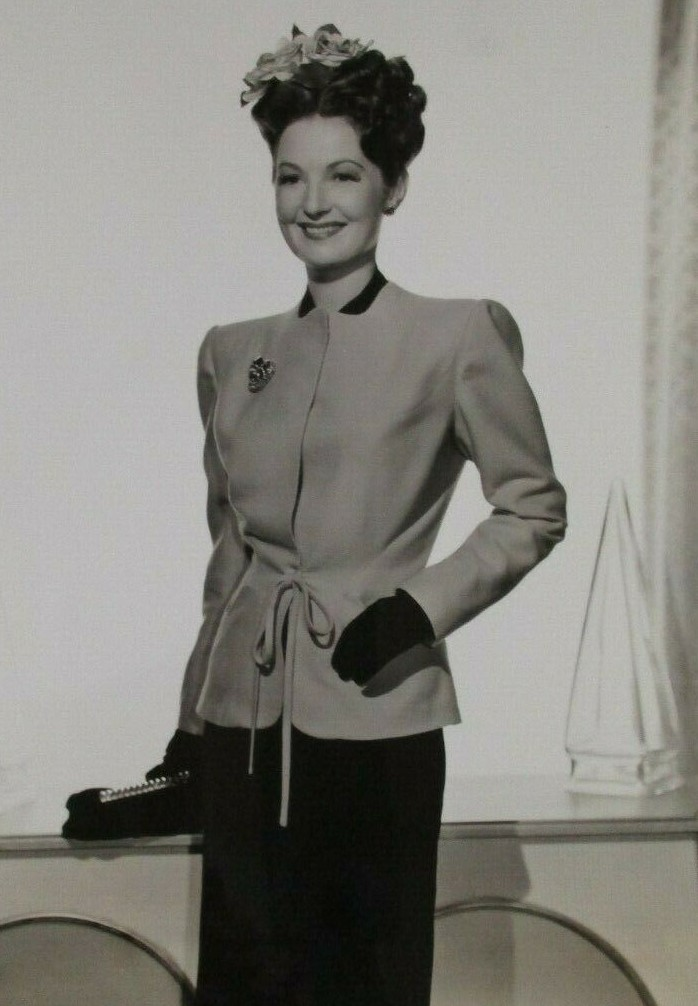
- Linden in 1943
- Born: Marta Leffler; October 24, 1903; New York City, U.S.
- Died: December 13, 1990 (aged 87); Lenox Hill Hospital, Manhattan, New York City, U.S.
- Occupation: Actress
- Years active: 1942–1954
- Notable work: A Yank at Eton (1942)
- Spouse: Albert Schmid (m. 1920)

Marta Linden (born Marta Leffler; October 24, 1903 - December 13, 1990) was an American actress. She was best known for appearing in Mickey Rooney's film A Yank at Eton (1942).

== Early life ==
Linden was born Marta Leffler on October 24, 1903, in New York City, and she was the daughter of Swedish parents. In the 1920s, she married businessman Alfred Schmid, whose fortune disappeared in the Great Depression.

After her husband lost his fortune, Linden found a job working at a candy counter. Eventually she decided that opportunity awaited in Hollywood, so the family moved there. Her acting at the Pasadena Community Playhouse developed into playing female leads. That exposure, in turn, led to interest from film executives.

== Career ==
=== Film career ===
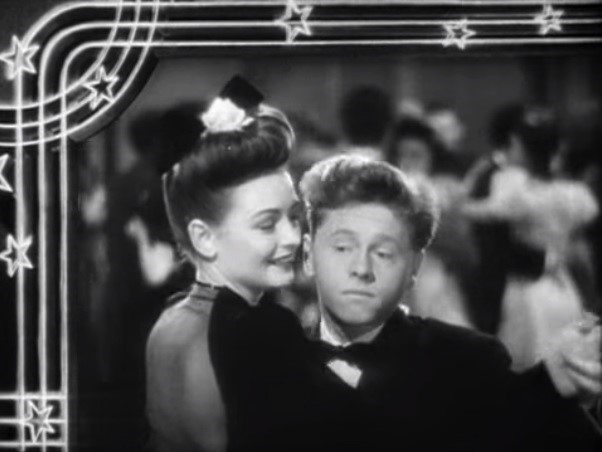
Linden & Mickey Rooney in the trailer of A Yank at Eton (1942)

In 1942, Linden signed a long-term contract with Metro-Goldwyn-Mayer. Films in which she appeared include The Youngest Profession (1943), A Yank at Eton (1942), Maisie Goes to Reno (1944), and Stand By for Action (1942).

=== Broadway ===
Linden's Broadway credits include The Starcross Story (1954), The Curious Savage (1950), Cry of the Peacock (1950), The Men We Marry (1948), and Present Laughter (1946). She also acted in the touring version of Present Laughter.

=== Later years ===
In 1954, Linden appeared in the soap opera Woman with a Past on CBS-TV.

== Death ==
On December 13, 1990, Linden died of pneumonia at Lenox Hill Hospital at age 87.
