= Rita Quigley =

American actress (1923–2008)

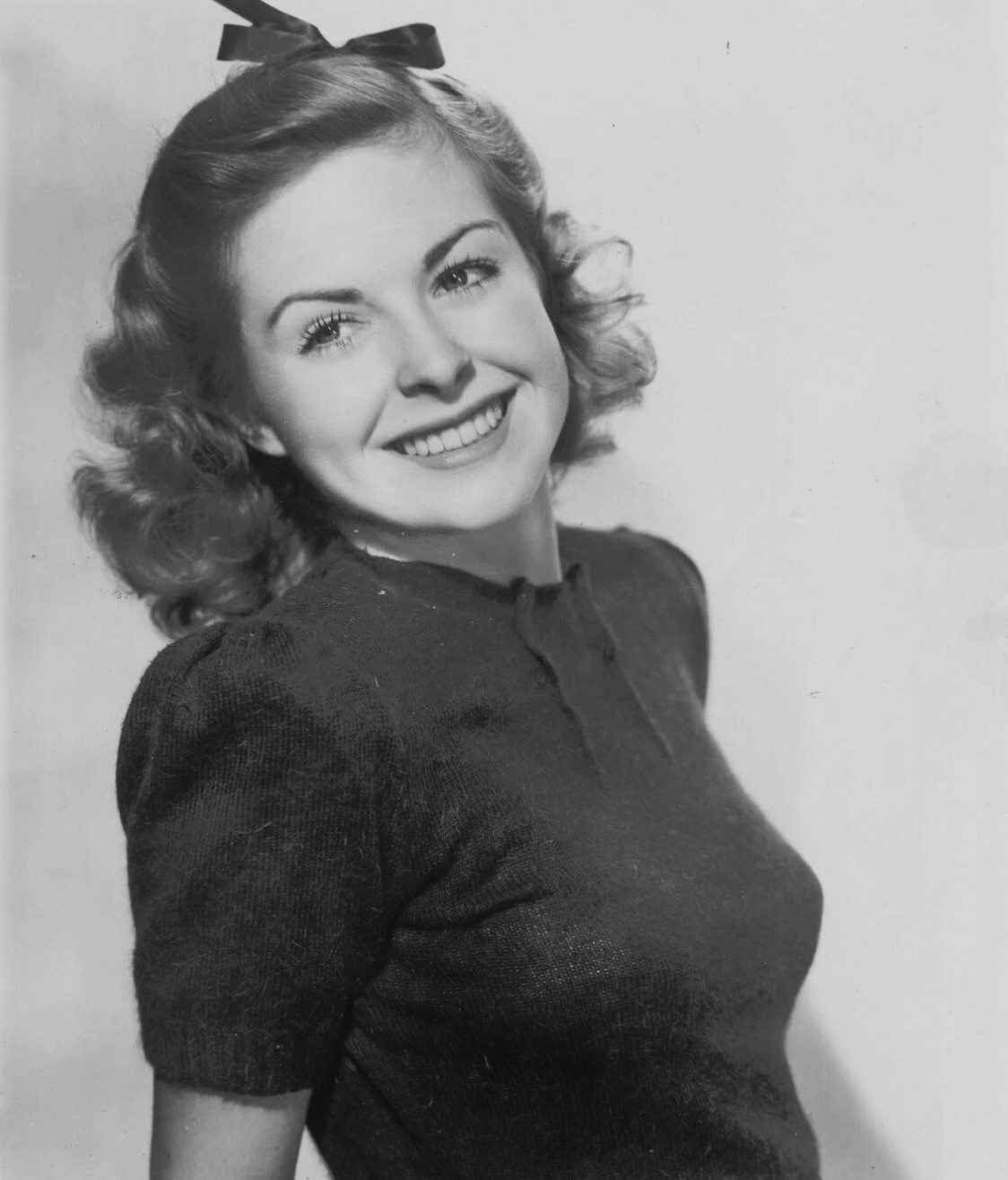
- Rita Quigley in Ride, Kelly, Ride (1941)
- Born: Rita Allene Quigley; March 31, 1923
- Died: August 25, 2008 (aged 85); Arroyo Grande, California, U.S.
- Resting place: Calvary Cemetery, Los Angeles
- Occupation: Actress
- Years active: 1940–1948
- Spouse: Arthur J. Goehner (his death)
- Children: 6

Rita Allene Quigley (March 31, 1923 – August 25, 2008) was an American actress.

== Early years ==
Quigley was the daughter of Mr. and Mrs. Wayne Quigley. Her father was "the originator of Los Angeles' far-famed open air groceries". She had one sister.

== Career ==
A visit to the commissary of Universal Pictures in 1939 led to Quigley's film career. She was seen by producer Joe Pasternak as she ate lunch with her mother and her sister, and that contact resulted in a role for her in the Deanna Durbin film First Love.

Quigley made her film debut in 1940 in Susan and God, and appeared in more than a dozen other movies, including Five Little Peppers in Trouble, The Howards of Virginia, Whispering Footsteps and The Human Comedy.

== Personal life ==
Quigley was married to Arthur Goehner. She left acting in the late 1940s to focus on raising her family.

== Death ==
Quigley died on August 25, 2008, in Arroyo Grande, California, and is buried in Calvary Cemetery in East Los Angeles.

== Filmography ==
Year	Title	Role	Notes
1940	Susan and God	Blossom	
1940	Five Little Peppers in Trouble	Peggy	
1940	The Howards of Virginia	Mary Howard at 17	
1940	Third Finger, Left Hand	Elvira Kelland	Uncredited
1940	Jennie	Amelia Schermer	
1941	Ride, Kelly, Ride	Ellen Martin	
1941	Blonde Inspiration	Regina	
1941	Riot Squad	Mary Davis	
1942	The Vanishing Virginian	Caroline, as an Adult	Uncredited
1942	Henry Aldrich, Editor	Martha Daley	
1942	Keeper of the Flame	Susan	Uncredited
1943	The Human Comedy	Helen Elliot	
1943	Isle of Forgotten Sins	Diane	
1943	Women in Bondage	Herta Rumann	
1943	Whispering Footsteps	Brook Hammond	
1946	The Trap	Clementine	
1948	Hills of Home	Alan Burnbrae's Wife	Uncredited
1969	The Love God?	Minor Role	Uncredited, (final film role)
