= Susan and God =

1940 film by George Cukor

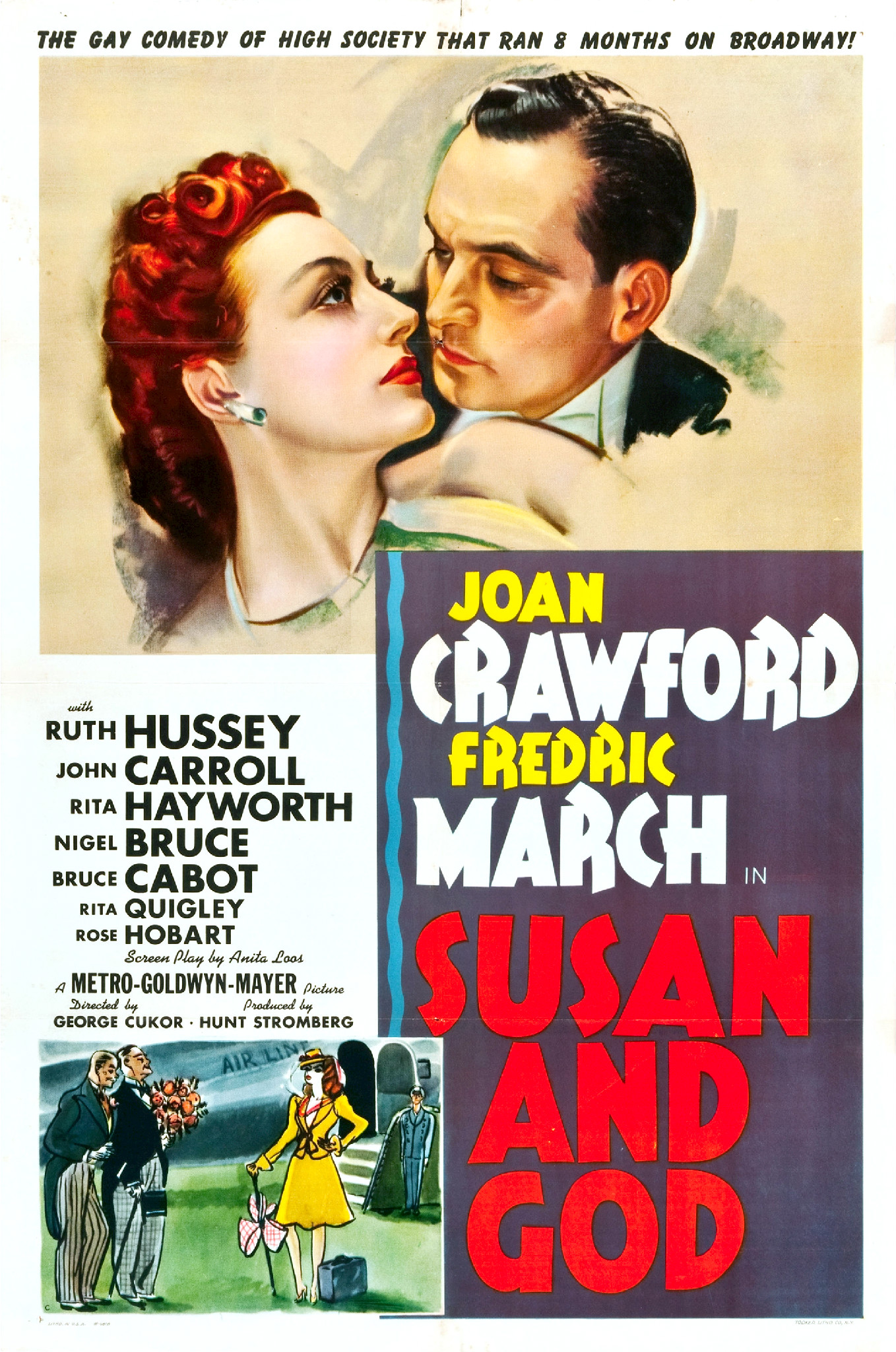
- Theatrical release poster
- Directed by: George Cukor
- Screenplay by: Anita Loos
- Based on: Susan and God; 1937 play by Rachel Crothers
- Produced by: Hunt Stromberg
- Starring: Joan Crawford; Fredric March
- Cinematography: Robert H. Planck
- Edited by: William H. Terhune
- Music by: Herbert Stothart
- Production company: Metro-Goldwyn-Mayer
- Distributed by: Loew's Inc.
- Release date: June 7, 1940 (US)
- Running time: 117 minutes
- Country: United States
- Language: English
- Budget: $1,103,000
- Box office: $1,096,000

Susan and God is a 1940 American comedy-drama film released by Metro-Goldwyn-Mayer directed by George Cukor and starring Joan Crawford and Fredric March. The screenplay was written by Anita Loos and was based upon a 1937 play by Rachel Crothers. The supporting cast features Rita Hayworth and Nigel Bruce.

The film follows the story of a society matron whose newfound religious fervor changes the relationships around her.

== Plot ==
Susan, a flighty society matron, returns from Europe earlier than expected waxing enthusiastic about a new religious movement. She is estranged from her intelligent and sensitive husband Barrie, who has been driven to drink by his wife's insensitivity, and she has neglected her introverted and maladjusted daughter Blossom. Barrie tries to meet her ship (SS Normandie) as it arrives in New York City, but she avoids him and absconds to the country home of her friend Irene Burroughs.

While at the house, her fervor and sermons alienate friends "Hutchie" and Leonora by insisting Leonora leave her elderly husband and return to the stage. Susan also insults Irene by telling her that she's unsuited for her lover Mike. While they all blow off Susan's musings, it sticks with them, and Barrie comes to the house to beg for forgiveness. He asks her to give him another chance for the sake of their daughter Blossom, and offers to finally grant Susan the divorce she seeks if he takes another drink. Susan consents and agrees to spend the summer with the family, thus making Blossom very happy. At first, Barrie is taken in by Susan's new passion, believing it is a sign of maturity, but he suffers disappointment when he realizes it is simply another manifestation of her shallowness. Gradually, Susan begins to understand the pain she has caused her family and determines to put her own house in order before meddling in the lives of others.

== Cast ==
- Joan Crawford as Susan Trexel
- Fredric March as Barrie Trexel
- Ruth Hussey as Charlotte
- John Carroll as Clyde Rochester
- Rita Hayworth as Leonora
- Nigel Bruce as "Hutchie"
- Bruce Cabot as Michael
- Rose Hobart as Irene Burroughs
- Constance Collier as Lady Millicent Wigstaff
- Rita Quigley as Blossom Trexel
- Gloria DeHaven as Enid
- Richard Crane as Bob
- Norma Mitchell as Hazel Paige
- Marjorie Main as Mary Maloney
- Aldrich Bowker as Patrick Maloney

== Production ==
The film Susan and God was based on Rachel Crothers' play Susan and God, which premiered in Princeton, New Jersey, then opened on Broadway on October 7, 1937 at the Plymouth Theatre. The original production, directed by John Golden and designed by Jo Mielziner, starred Gertrude Lawrence and ran for 288 performances. MGM reportedly paid $75,000 (USD) for the rights to the play. Crothers' play reportedly was inspired by Dr. Frank Buchman's Oxford Group, a religious movement of the 1930s.

It was intended as a vehicle for Norma Shearer, but the star refused to play the role of a mother with a teenage daughter. Greer Garson was considered for the role before it went to Joan Crawford.

Rita Hayworth was loaned to MGM for this film by her studio Columbia Pictures. This was Fredric March's return to film after a year and a half's absence appearing on the stage.

== Reception ==
Variety noted "Joan Crawford provides a strong portrayal of Susan...George Cukor's direction highlights the characterizations he unfolds." Howard Barnes in the New York Herald Tribune wrote "[Crawford] is not entirely successful in blending silliness with romantic power."

Although well-reviewed, the movie failed to make a return on its budget; according to MGM records, it made $817,000 in the U.S. and Canada and $279,000 in other markets, resulting in a loss of $433,000.

== Television ==
On June 7, 1938, an excerpt from Susan and God was the first Broadway play with its original cast to be broadcast on television. Station W2XBS used exact replicas of the stage sets, with Nancy Coleman, Gertrude Lawrence, and Paul McGrath appearing on the broadcast.

== Home media ==
Susan and God was released on Region 1 DVD on April 6, 2010 from the online Warner Bros. Archive Collection.
