= Baby Jane (musician) =

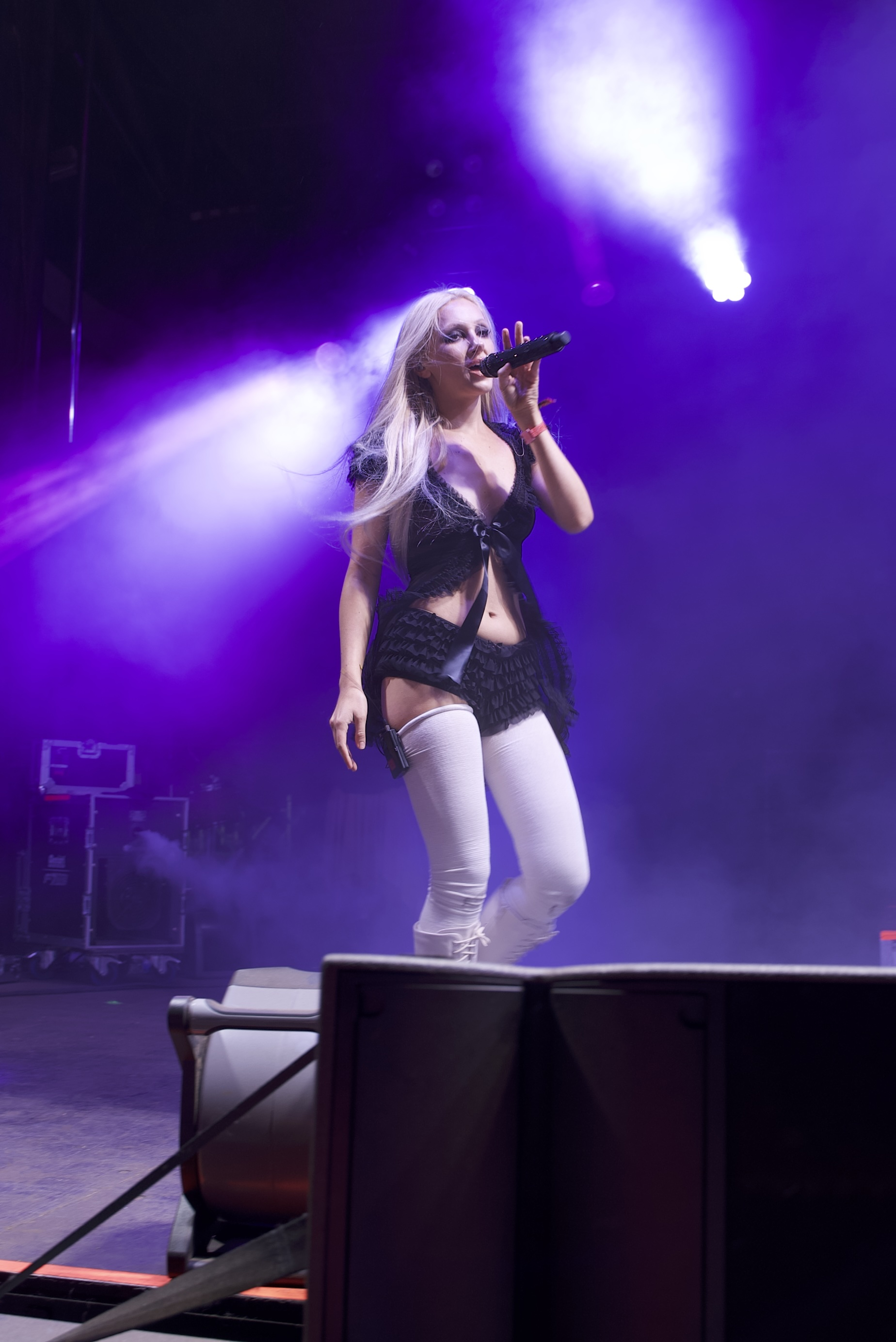
- Jane in 2025

Background information
- Born: Sofia Bella Galuz; August 1, 2001 (age 25); Oakland, California, U.S.
- Origin: Los Angeles, California
- Genres: Electronic; gothic house; pop
- Occupations: Music producer; singer-songwriter; DJ
- Years active: 2020–present
- Website: babyjane.komi.io

Sofia Bella Galuz (born August 1, 2001), known professionally as Baby Jane, is an American music producer, singer-songwriter, and DJ based in Los Angeles, California. She is known for her work which includes elements of electronic, gothic house, and pop music.

== Early life and education ==
Jane was born in 2001 in Oakland, California, to parents who immigrated from the former Soviet Union. Classically trained on the piano since the age of 5, she began writing songs at 13 upon teaching herself to play guitar. At age 14, she tested out of high school to pursue music full time and earned a bachelor's degree in music production and sound engineering by 18 years old. Her stage name is derived from the 1962 film What Ever Happened to Baby Jane?.

== Career ==
Jane's early releases included the single All the Saints of Notre Dame, which received significant traction on TikTok. She followed it with songs such as Spellbound and Fairy Bites, which combined electronic and pop elements. During this period, she built a following on digital platforms.

After the COVID-19 pandemic, she began performing as a DJ in Los Angeles's underground music venues and refined a production style she has referred to as "gothic house". In June 2025, Jane issued her debut full-length album, A Grave Marked Strange featuring popular tracks like Eternal Embrace, Psychotrance, Cemetery Date, and End of the Night.

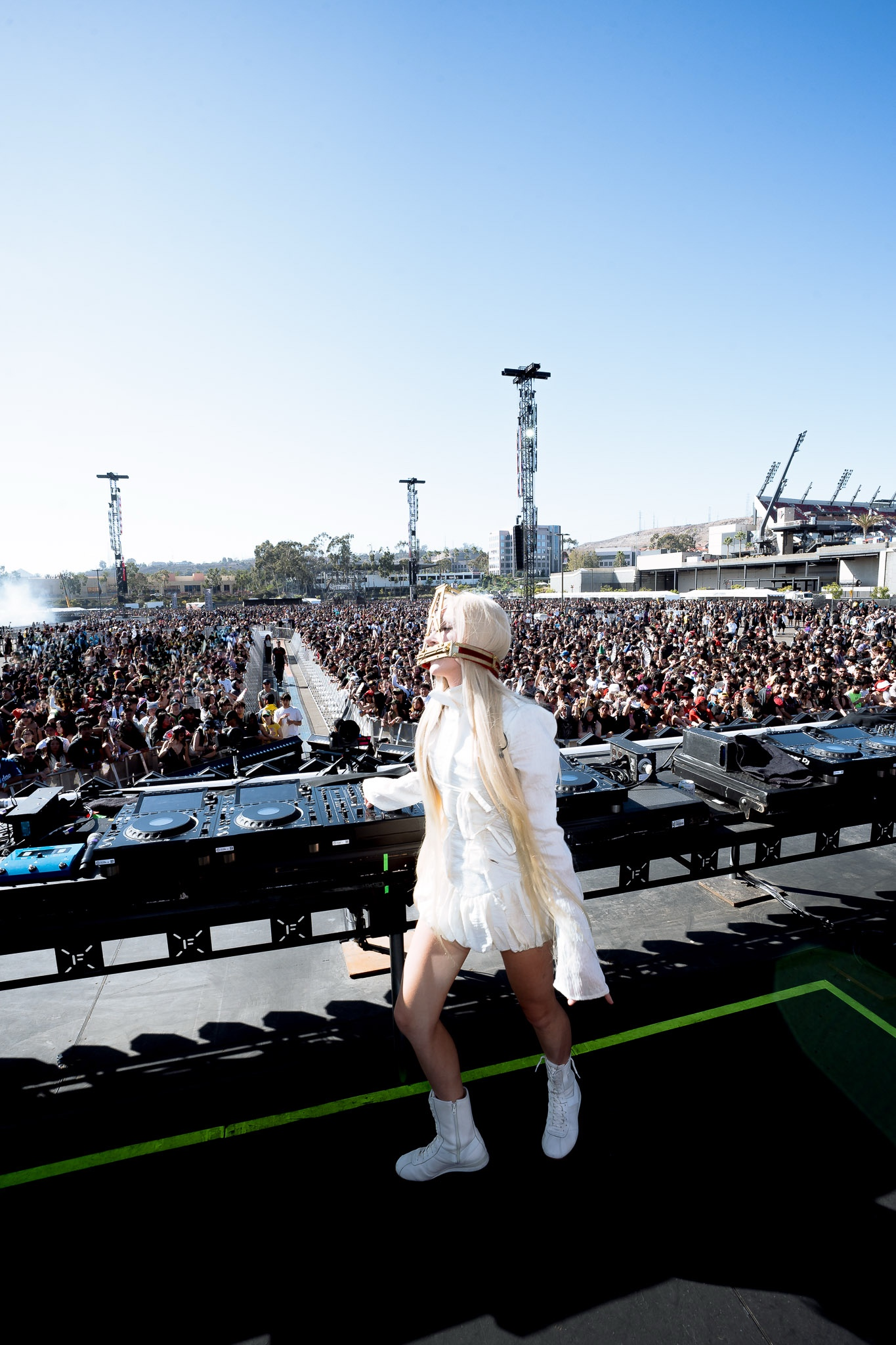
Baby Jane performing at Niteharts Festival wearing a custom Scold's bridle — also called branks – crafted by a fan in homage to her song "Put Me in the Branks." The piece references the medieval punishment device once used to silence women accused of gossip or rebellion.

In 2025, Baby Jane performed at Niteharts Festival in San Diego with Zedd, Skrillex, Knock2, and ISOxo. The festival drew an audience of approximately 25,000 attendees and also known artists including horsegiirL and Yellow Claw.

== Terem and fan engagement ==
Jane has developed a fictional framework called Terem, consisting of three symbolic archetypes—The Cowboy, The Warrior, and The Goddess. The framework is integrated into audience engagement initiatives, including quizzes and multimedia content. Her fan community is sometimes referred to collectively as The Coven.

== Discography ==
=== Studio albums ===
Year	Title	Notes
2024	Otherworld	Debut studio album
2025	A Grave Marked Strange	
2026	Winter Forever	

=== Selected singles ===
Year	Title
2022	"Make Me Wanna"
2022	"Make It Through the Night"
2023	"If the Devil Looked Like You"
2023	"Dreaming of You"
2023	"Hex"
2023	"Heartstrings"
2023	"All the Saints of Notre"
2024	"Psychotrance"
2024	"Reincarnate"
2024	"Eternal Embrace"
2024	"Deathwish"
2024	"Cemetery Date"
2024	"Three Hail Marys"
2024	"Heroin Kiss"
2025	"Winter 4ever"
2025	"All the Saints VIP"
2026	"Starry Eyed"
2026	"Head Full of Nightmares"
2026	"Malvina"
