= List of Metro-Goldwyn-Mayer films (1940–1949) =

The following is a list of films originally produced and/or distributed theatrically by Metro-Goldwyn-Mayer and released in the 1940s.

== 1940 ==
Release date	Title	Notes
January 5, 1940	The Earl of Chicago	
January 12, 1940	The Shop Around the Corner	
January 19, 1940	Congo Maisie	
January 26, 1940	The Lambeth Walk	Distribution; presented by CAPAD: A Pinebrook production
February 2, 1940	I Take This Woman	
February 9, 1940	Broadway Melody of 1940	
February 16, 1940	The Man from Dakota	
February 23, 1940	Northwest Passage	
March 1, 1940	Strange Cargo	
March 1, 1940	The Ghost Comes Home	
March 15, 1940	Young Tom Edison	
April 5, 1940	And One Was Beautiful	
April 12, 1940	Dr. Kildare's Strange Case	4th entry in the Dr. Kildare film series
April 19, 1940	Two Girls on Broadway	
April 26, 1940	Forty Little Mothers	
May 3, 1940	20 Mule Team	
May 10, 1940	Edison, the Man	
May 17, 1940	Waterloo Bridge	
June 5, 1940	Florian	
June 7, 1940	Susan and God	
June 7, 1940	Phantom Raiders	A Nick Carter adventure
June 14, 1940	The Mortal Storm	
June 21, 1940	The Captain Is a Lady	
July 5, 1940	Andy Hardy Meets Debutante	9th entry in the Andy Hardy film series
July 12, 1940	Sporting Blood	
July 19, 1940	New Moon	
July 19, 1940	We Who Are Young	
July 26, 1940	Pride and Prejudice	
July 26, 1940	Gold Rush Maisie	
August 9, 1940	I Love You Again	
August 16, 1940	The Golden Fleecing	
August 30, 1940	Boom Town	
September 6, 1940	Dr. Kildare Goes Home	5th entry in the Dr. Kildare film series
September 13, 1940	Wyoming	
September 20, 1940	Haunted Honeymoon	Made by MGM-British
September 27, 1940	Strike Up the Band	
September 27, 1940	Sky Murder	A Nick Carter adventure
October 4, 1940	Dulcy	
October 11, 1940	Third Finger, Left Hand	
October 25, 1940	Hullabaloo	
November 1, 1940	Escape	
November 8, 1940	Bitter Sweet	
November 15, 1940	Gallant Sons	
November 22, 1940	Little Nellie Kelly	
November 29, 1940	Dr. Kildare's Crisis	
December 6, 1940	Go West	
December 13, 1940	Comrade X	
December 26, 1940	The Philadelphia Story	Nominated for Academy Award for Best Picture; Remade as High Society in 1956
December 27, 1940	Flight Command	Presented with the cooperation of the United States Navy
December 27, 1940	Keeping Company	

== 1941 ==
Release date	Title	Notes
January 10, 1941	Maisie Was a Lady	
January 24, 1941	The Wild Man of Borneo	
January 31, 1941	Come Live with Me	
February 7, 1941	Blonde Inspiration	
February 14, 1941	The Trial of Mary Dugan	
February 21, 1941	Andy Hardy's Private Secretary	10th entry in the Andy Hardy film series
February 28, 1941	Free and Easy	
March 7, 1941	Rage in Heaven	
March 14, 1941	The Penalty	
March 28, 1941	The Bad Man	
April 7, 1941	Barnacle Bill	
April 11, 1941	Men of Boys Town	
April 18, 1941	Washington Melodrama	
April 25, 1941	Ziegfeld Girl	
May 2, 1941	The People vs. Dr. Kildare	7th entry in the Dr. Kildare film series
May 16, 1941	I'll Wait for You	
May 23, 1941	A Woman's Face	
May 23, 1941	Love Crazy	
May 30, 1941	Billy the Kid	
June 13, 1941	The Get-Away	
June 20, 1941	The Big Store	
June 27, 1941	They Met in Bombay	
July 23, 1941	The Stars Look Down	US distribution; a Grafton Film
July 25, 1941	Blossoms in the Dust	Nominated for Academy Award for Best Picture
July 30, 1941	Down in San Diego	
August 1, 1941	Ringside Maisie	
August 8, 1941	Whistling in the Dark	
August 12, 1941	Dr. Jekyll and Mr. Hyde	
August 15, 1941	Life Begins for Andy Hardy	11th entry in the Andy Hardy film series
August 22, 1941	Dr. Kildare's Wedding Day	8th entry in the Dr. Kildare film series
August 29, 1941	When Ladies Meet	
September 1, 1941	Lady Be Good	
September 12, 1941	The Feminine Touch	
October 1, 1941	Honky Tonk	
October 16, 1941	Married Bachelor	
October 31, 1941	The Chocolate Soldier	
October 1941	Smilin' Through	
November 11, 1941	Design for Scandal	
November 21, 1941	Shadow of the Thin Man	
November 30, 1941	Two-Faced Woman	
November 1941	Unholy Partners	
December 1, 1941	Tarzan's Secret Treasure	
December 9, 1941	Johnny Eager	
December 18, 1941	H. M. Pulham, Esq.	
December 18, 1941	Kathleen	
December 31, 1941	Babes on Broadway	

== 1942 ==
Release date	Title	Notes
January 6, 1942	Joe Smith, American	
January 21, 1942	Nazi Agent	
January 23, 1942	The Vanishing Virginian	
January 23, 1942	Mr. and Mrs. North	
January 29, 1942	A Yank on the Burma Road	
January 30, 1942	The Bugle Sounds	
February 4, 1942	Dr. Kildare's Victory	9th, and final, entry in the Dr. Kildare film series with Lew Ayres as Dr. Kildare
February 5, 1942	Woman of the Year	
February 11, 1942	The Courtship of Andy Hardy	12th entry in the Andy Hardy film series
February 18, 1942	Born to Sing	
March 1942	This Time for Keeps	
March 11, 1942	Rio Rita	
April 17, 1942	Kid Glove Killer	
April 22, 1942	Fingers at the Window	
April 30, 1942	We Were Dancing	
April 1942	Mokey	
May 8, 1942	Sunday Punch	
May 21, 1942	Tortilla Flat	
May 21, 1942	Pacific Rendezvous	
May 23, 1942	Grand Central Murder	
May 1942	Tarzan's New York Adventure	
May 1942	Ship Ahoy	
June 4, 1942	Mrs. Miniver	Winner of the Academy Award for Best Picture
June 21, 1942	The Affairs of Martha	
June 24, 1942	Apache Trail	
June 1942	Maisie Gets Her Man	
July 1, 1942	Jackass Mail	
July 9, 1942	I Married an Angel	
July 9, 1942	Calling Dr. Gillespie	
July 16, 1942	Her Cardboard Lover	
July 23, 1942	Crossroads	
July 29, 1942	Pierre of the Plains	
August 7, 1942	The War Against Mrs. Hadley	
August 13, 1942	Face Off	
August 17, 1942	Cairo	
August 17, 1942	Somewhere I'll Find You	
September 17, 1942	Tish	
September 1942	The Omaha Trail	
September 1942	A Yank at Eton	
October 1, 1942	Panama Hattie	
October 16, 1942	Eyes in the Night	
October 21, 1942	For Me and My Gal	
November 12, 1942	Dr. Gillespie's New Assistant	
November 13, 1942	Seven Sweethearts	
November 30, 1942	Talk About Jacqueline	Distribution only; an Excelsior Films production Released in the US in 1944
December 1, 1942	Northwest Rangers	
December 12, 1942	White Cargo	
December 17, 1942	Journey for Margaret	
December 17, 1942	Random Harvest	Nominated for Academy Award for Best Picture
December 21, 1942	Keeper of the Flame	
December 25, 1942	Reunion in France	
December 31, 1942	Whistling in Dixie	
December 31, 1942	Stand by for Action	

== 1943 ==
Release date	Title	Notes
January 12, 1943	Tennessee Johnson	
February 11, 1943	Andy Hardy's Double Life	13th entry in the Andy Hardy film series
February 26, 1943	The Youngest Profession	
March 2, 1943	The Human Comedy	Nominated for Academy Award for Best Picture
March 11, 1943	Assignment in Brittany	
March 17, 1943	Harrigan's Kid	
April 1, 1943	Slightly Dangerous	
April 4, 1943	Air Raid Wardens	
April 9, 1943	Cabin in the Sky	
April 29, 1943	Presenting Lily Mars	
April 1943	A Stranger in Town	Never copyrighted
May 5, 1943	Du Barry Was a Lady	
May 8, 1943	Dr. Gillespie's Criminal Case	
May 21, 1943	Three Hearts for Julia	
June 3, 1943	Bataan	
June 10, 1943	Hitler's Madman	
June 24, 1943	Pilot No. 5	
August 2, 1943	Young Ideas	
August 4, 1943	The Man from Down Under	
August 5, 1943	Above Suspicion	
August 30, 1943	Salute to the Marines	
September 13, 1943	Thousands Cheer	
September 24, 1943	The Adventures of Tartu	Made by MGM-British
September 1943	I Dood It	
October 1, 1943	Swing Shift Maisie	
October 7, 1943	Lassie Come Home	Laserdisc release contains the Short films: Fala & Fala At Hyde Park
October 8, 1943	Best Foot Forward	
November 1, 1943	Swing Fever	
November 12, 1943	The Cross of Lorraine	
November 23, 1943	Cry "Havoc"	
November 26, 1943	Girl Crazy	Laserdisc release contains the Short Film Studio Visit.
December 16, 1943	Madame Curie	Nominated for Academy Award for Best Picture; Laserdisc release contains the Short Film Romance of Radium.
December 23, 1943	Lost Angel	
December 24, 1943	A Guy Named Joe	Laserdisc release contains the Short Film Movie Pests.
December 1943	Whistling in Brooklyn	

== 1944 ==
Release date	Title	Notes
January 19, 1944	Broadway Rhythm	
February 10, 1944	Song of Russia	
March 18, 1944	See Here, Private Hargrove	
March 23, 1944	The Heavenly Body	
March 24, 1944	Rationing	
April 1, 1944	Tunisian Victory	US distribution only; produced by British and American service film units
May 4, 1944	Gaslight	Nominated for Academy Award for Best Picture
May 4, 1944	Andy Hardy's Blonde Trouble	14th entry in the Andy Hardy film series
May 11, 1944	The White Cliffs of Dover	
May 25, 1944	3 Men in White	
June 1, 1944	Meet the People	
June 14, 1944	Two Girls and a Sailor	
June 27, 1944	Bathing Beauty	
July 20, 1944	Dragon Seed	
July 24, 1944	The Seventh Cross	
July 28, 1944	The Canterville Ghost	
August 22, 1944	Kismet	
August 23, 1944	Marriage Is a Private Affair	
September 11, 1944	María Candelaria	Distribution of the 1948 dubbed US re-release only
September 28, 1944	Barbary Coast Gent	
September 28, 1944	Maisie Goes to Reno	
October 11, 1944	An American Romance	
October 12, 1944	Mrs. Parkington	
November 8, 1944	Lost in a Harem	
November 15, 1944	Thirty Seconds Over Tokyo	
November 28, 1944	Meet Me in St. Louis	
December 5, 1944	Blonde Fever	
December 6, 1944	Nothing But Trouble	
December 14, 1944	National Velvet	50th Anniversary Edition Laserdisc release contains Short Film Spreadin' The Jam
December 18, 1944	Music for Millions	

== 1945 ==
Release date	Title	Notes
January 4, 1945	This Man's Navy	
January 12, 1945	Main Street After Dark	
January 25, 1945	The Thin Man Goes Home	
March 3, 1945	The Picture of Dorian Gray	
March 8, 1945	Keep Your Powder Dry	
March 22, 1945	Without Love	
March 28, 1945	Between Two Women	
April 20, 1945	Son of Lassie	
May 3, 1945	The Valley of Decision	
May 4, 1945	Gentle Annie	
May 23, 1945	Thrill of a Romance	
May 25, 1945	The Clock	
May 31, 1945	Twice Blessed	
June 7, 1945	Dangerous Partners	
July 4, 1945	Bewitched	
July 14, 1945	Anchors Aweigh	Nominated for Academy Award for Best Picture
August 13, 1945	Ziegfeld Follies	
August 22, 1945	Abbott and Costello in Hollywood	
August 31, 1945	The Hidden Eye	
September 6, 1945	Our Vines Have Tender Grapes	
September 11, 1945	Her Highness and the Bellboy	
October 4, 1945	Week-End at the Waldorf	
November 1, 1945	Perfect Strangers	Co-production with London Film Productions
November 4, 1945	She Went to the Races	
November 20, 1945	Yolanda and the Thief	
November 21, 1945	What Next, Corporal Hargrove?	
November 27, 1945	The Last Chance	Presented by MGM International Films Corporation – A Praesens-Film production
December 20, 1945	They Were Expendable	
December 21, 1945	It Happened at the Inn	US distribution only; produced in France by Les Films Minerva

== 1946 ==
Release date	Title	Notes
1946	The Great Morgan	A compilation film; released overseas only
January 18, 1946	The Harvey Girls	
January 28, 1946	A Letter for Evie	
February 1, 1946	Up Goes Maisie	
February 7, 1946	Adventure	
February 28, 1946	The Sailor Takes a Wife	
April 4, 1946	The Hoodlum Saint	
May 2, 1946	The Postman Always Rings Twice	
May 22, 1946	Bad Bascomb	
June 4, 1946	Two Smart People	
June 6, 1946	Two Sisters from Boston	
June 10, 1946	Little Mister Jim	
June 15, 1946	Stormy Waters	US distribution only; produced in France by SEDIF
July 4, 1946	The Green Years	
July 11, 1946	Easy to Wed	Remake of Libeled Lady (1936)
July 18, 1946	Boys' Ranch	
August 4, 1946	Piccadilly Incident	US distribution only; produced in the UK by Herbert Wilcox Productions
August 15, 1946	Holiday in Mexico	
August 22, 1946	Faithful in My Fashion	
September 26, 1946	Three Wise Fools	
October 3, 1946	No Leave, No Love	
October 24, 1946	The Cockeyed Miracle	
November 8, 1946	Courage of Lassie	
November 28, 1946	Undercurrent	
December 5, 1946	Till the Clouds Roll By	Public domain
December 5, 1946	Gallant Bess	
December 18, 1946	The Yearling	Nominated for Academy Award for Best Picture
December 25, 1946	The Secret Heart	
December 25, 1946	Love Laughs at Andy Hardy	15th entry in the Andy Hardy film series
December 1946	The Show-Off	

== 1947 ==
Release date	Title	Notes
January 2, 1947	The Mighty McGurk	
January 23, 1947	Lady in the Lake	
February 4, 1947	My Brother Talks to Horses	
February 13, 1947	The Arnelo Affair	
February 19, 1947	The Beginning or the End	
March 1, 1947	Undercover Maisie	
March 11, 1947	High Barbaree	
April 7, 1947	It Happened in Brooklyn	
April 25, 1947	The Sea of Grass	
June 10, 1947	Living in a Big Way	
June 12, 1947	Fiesta	
June 25, 1947	Dark Delusion	
July 17, 1947	The Hucksters	
August 4, 1947	The Romance of Rosy Ridge	
August 28, 1947	Song of the Thin Man	
August 29, 1947	Cynthia	
September 19, 1947	The Unfinished Dance	
October 9, 1947	Song of Love	
October 9, 1947	High Barbaree	
October 11, 1947	Merton of the Movies	
October 17, 1947	This Time for Keeps	
October 24, 1947	Killer McCoy	
October 31, 1947	Desire Me	
November 5, 1947	Green Dolphin Street	
November 6, 1947	Cass Timberlane	
December 17, 1947	High Wall	
December 26, 1947	Good News	
December 31, 1947	If Winter Comes	

== 1948 ==
Release date	Title	Notes
February 3, 1948	Alias a Gentleman	
February 20, 1948	Tenth Avenue Angel	
March 3, 1948	The Bride Goes Wild	
March 5, 1948	Three Daring Daughters	
March 25, 1948	Big City	
March 26, 1948	The Search	Produced by Praesens-Film, Zürich for Metro-Goldwyn-Mayer; Portions of the film were produced in the U. S occupied Zone of Germany through the permission of the U. S. Army and the cooperation of I. R. O.
April 2, 1948	B.F.'s Daughter	
April 16, 1948	Summer Holiday	
April 29, 1948	Homecoming	
April 30, 1948	State of the Union	Distribution only; produced by Liberty Films
May 3, 1948	On an Island with You	
June 11, 1948	The Pirate	
July 8, 1948	Easter Parade	
July 29, 1948	A Date with Judy	
August 5, 1948	A Southern Yankee	
August 8, 1948	Julia Misbehaves	
September 9, 1948	Luxury Liner	
October 22, 1948	The Secret Land	
November 12, 1948	No Minor Vices	Distribution only; produced by Enterprise Productions Studio and Niagara Enterprises
November 18, 1948	The Kissing Bandit	
November 25, 1948	Hills of Home	
November 26, 1948	The Three Musketeers	
December 1, 1948	3 Godfathers	Made by Argosy Pictures Corporation
December 21, 1948	Act of Violence	
December 25, 1948	Command Decision	
December 25, 1948	Force of Evil	Distribution only; produced by Roberts Production; An MGM and Enterprise Productions presentation
December 31, 1948	Words and Music	

== 1949 ==
Release date	Title	Notes
February 3, 1949	The Bribe	
February 17, 1949	Caught	Distribution only; produced by Enterprise Productions
March 3, 1949	Tale of the Navajos	Feature-length documentary
March 10, 1949	Little Women	
April 12, 1949	Big Jack	
April 13, 1949	Take Me Out to the Ball Game	
April 30, 1949	The Secret Garden	
May 4, 1949	The Barkleys of Broadway	
May 12, 1949	The Sun Comes Up	
May 12, 1949	The Stratton Story	
June 2, 1949	Edward, My Son	made by MGM-British
June 9, 1949	Neptune's Daughter	
June 29, 1949	The Great Sinner	
July 15, 1949	Any Number Can Play	
July 28, 1949	Scene of the Crime	
July 29, 1949	In the Good Old Summertime	Musical remake of The Shop Around the Corner
August 25, 1949	Madame Bovary	
September 22, 1949	That Midnight Kiss	
September 29, 1949	The Doctor and the Girl	
October 14, 1949	The Red Danube	
October 28, 1949	Border Incident	
October 31, 1949	Challenge to Lassie	
November 3, 1949	That Forsyte Woman	
November 9, 1949	Battleground	Nominated for Academy Award for Best Picture
November 18, 1949	Adam's Rib	
November 22, 1949	Intruder in the Dust	
November 23, 1949	Tension	
December 22, 1949	East Side, West Side	
December 27, 1949	Malaya	
December 30, 1949	On the Town	

== See also ==
- Lists of Metro-Goldwyn-Mayer films
