= Mary C. McCall Jr. =

American screenwriter

- Born: April 4, 1904; New York City, U.S.
- Died: April 3, 1986 (aged 81); Los Angeles, California, U.S.
- Occupations: Screenwriter, labor leader
- Political party: Democrat
- Spouse(s): Dwight Franklin (m. 1928; div. 1943); David Bramson (m. 1943; died 1978)
- Children: 4

Mary C. McCall Jr. (April 4, 1904 – April 3, 1986) was an American writer best known for her screenwriting. She was a charter member and the first woman president of the Writers Guild of America (then known as the Screen Writers Guild), serving from 1942 to 1944 and 1951 to 1952.

== Biography ==
Mary C. McCall Jr. was born on April 4, 1904, to a wealthy Irish American family in New York. She wanted to be a writer from the time she was in first grade. After graduating from Vassar College and Trinity College, Dublin, she began writing advertising copy and fiction.

In 1932, McCall published her first novel, The Goldfish Bowl, a satirical comedy loosely based on Anne Morrow and Charles Lindbergh. The film rights were purchased by Warner Bros., but McCall did not get to write the screenplay for the film version, It's Tough to Be Famous (1932), starring Douglas Fairbanks Jr. Instead, Warner Bros. signed her to a ten-week contract to write Street of Women (1932). They also assigned her to help with the screenplay of the film Scarlet Dawn (1932), based on her tragic novel of the Russian Revolution titled Revolt. In 1934, McCall landed a long-term contract with Warner Bros. and became involved with the Screen Writers Guild.

McCall became an associate member of the Guild in 1934 and served her first of six terms on the executive board in 1935. As a member of the negotiating committee, she worked to help secure the Guild's first contract with the studios, and as a member of the executive board, she helped secure an across-the-board wage increase from $40 to $125 per week for writers. In 1942, the first year the contract was signed, McCall was elected the first woman president of the Guild.

During her career, McCall wrote for Warner Bros., Columbia Pictures, and Metro-Goldwyn-Mayer. Among her screen credits are the 1935 version of A Midsummer Night's Dream, Craig's Wife (1936), The Fighting Sullivans (1944), and Mr. Belvedere Goes to College (1950). She wrote the script for the gangster film Dr. Socrates (1935), but the film's star Paul Muni demanded that McCall be replaced with a male screenwriter. At MGM, she transformed Wilson Collison's novel Dark Dame into Maisie (1939), launching the successful Maisie series starring Ann Sothern. McCall wrote or co-wrote eight of the ten films in the series.

All but blacklisted from the film industry in the 1950s, she branched out into television, credited with writing fifteen episodes of The Millionaire, eight episodes of The Ford Television Theatre, three of The Third Man (TV series), and one each of Sea Hunt, I Dream of Jeannie, and Gilligan's Island, among others. A number of her poems and short stories were published in magazines such as The New Yorker, Cosmopolitan, Redbook, Collier's, and The Saturday Evening Post from the 1920s to the 1950s.

McCall was one of many who clashed with the conservative Motion Picture Alliance. On July 27, 1954, she had to defend herself in front of the House Un-American Activities Committee against reports that she was a communist sympathizer. She was completely exonerated by the separate California Senate Factfinding Subcommittee on Un-American Activities of the General Research Committee in its report to the California Senate.

Mary C. McCall Jr. died of "complications of cancer" at the Motion Picture and Television Hospital, one day shy of her 82nd birthday.

She was the first recipient of the Writers Guild's Valentine Davies Award in 1962. In 1985, she also received the Guild's Edmund J. North Award.

== Complete filmography ==
- Street of Women (1932)
- Scarlet Dawn (1932)
- Desirable (1934)
- Babbitt (1934)
- The Secret Bride (1934)
- The Woman in Red (1935)
- A Midsummer Night's Dream (1935)
- Dr. Socrates (1935) (adaptation)
- Snowed Under (1936) (uncredited contributor)
- Craig's Wife (1936)
- Ready, Willing, and Able (1936) (uncredited contributor)
- Women of Glamour (1937)
- I Promise to Pay (1937)
- It's All Yours (1937)
- A Slight Case of Murder (1938)
- Secrets of an Actress (1938) (uncredited contributing writer)
- Breaking the Ice (1938)
- Dramatic School (1938)
- Maisie (1939)
- Congo Maisie (1940)
- Gold Rush Maisie (1940)
- Maisie Was a Lady (1941)
- Ringside Maisie (1941)
- Kathleen (1941)
- On the Sunny Side (1942) (short story)
- Maisie Gets Her Man (1942)
- Panama Hattie (1942) (uncredited)
- Swing Shift Maisie (1943)
- The Fighting Sullivans (1944)
- Reward Unlimited (1944 short)
- Maisie Goes to Reno (1944)
- Keep Your Powder Dry (1945)
- Mr. Belvedere Goes to College (1949)
- Thunderbirds (1952)
- Ride the Man Down (1952)
- Slim Carter (1957) (story)
- Juke Box Rhythm (1959)
