= Congo Maisie =

1940 film by H. C. Potter

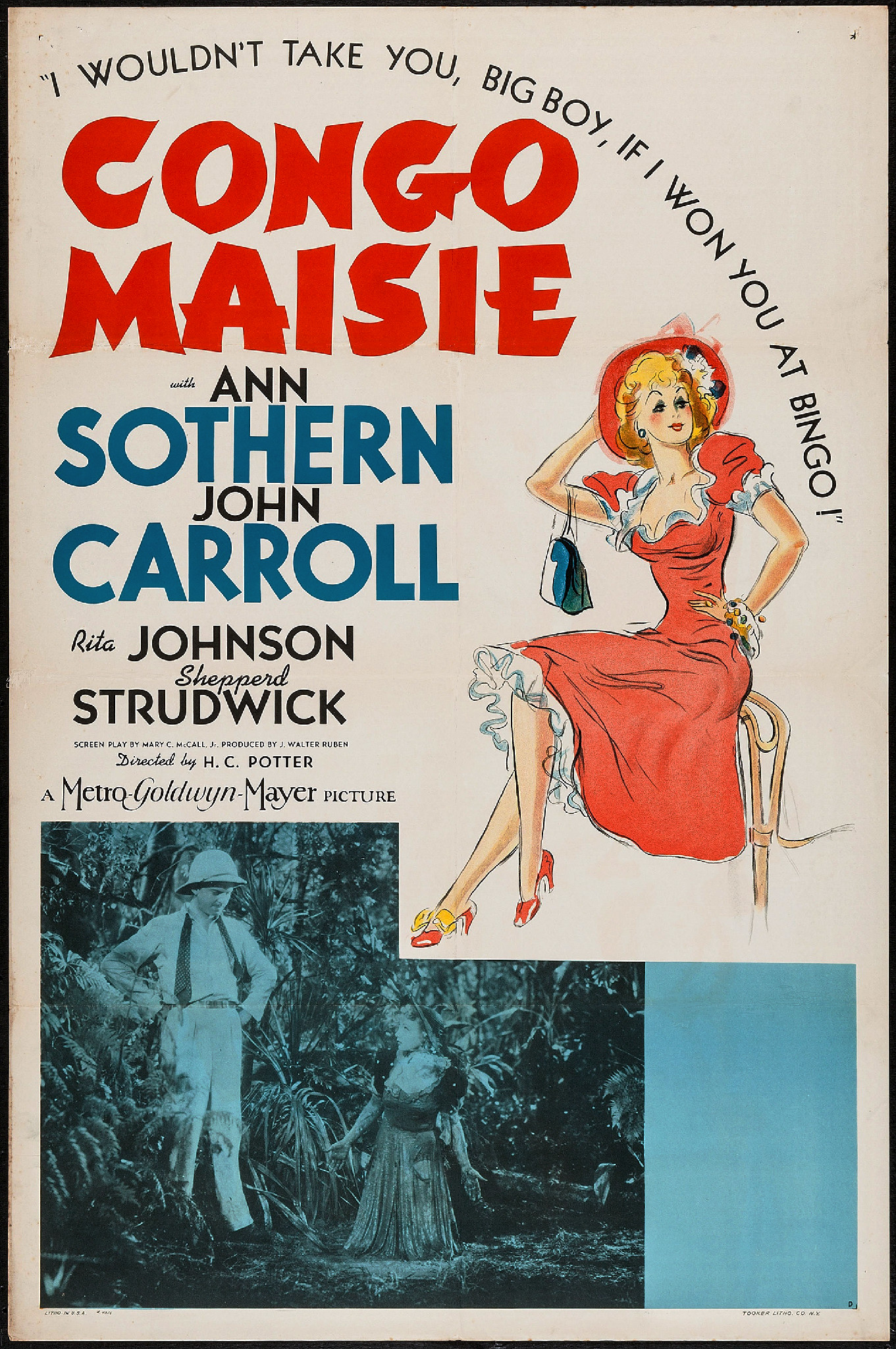
- Film poster
- Directed by: H. C. Potter
- Written by: Mary C. McCall Jr.
- Based on: Congo Landing; 1934 novel by Wilson Collison
- Produced by: J. Walter Ruben
- Starring: Ann Sothern; John Carroll
- Cinematography: Charles Lawton Jr.
- Edited by: Fredrick Y. Smith
- Music by: Edward Ward
- Distributed by: Metro-Goldwyn-Mayer
- Release date: January 19, 1940
- Running time: 71 minutes
- Country: United States
- Language: English

Congo Maisie is a 1940 comedy-drama film directed by H. C. Potter and starring Ann Sothern for the second time in the ten film Maisie series as showgirl Maisie Ravier. It was based on an original script by Erich Von Stroheim.

== Plot ==
Maisie Ravier, a fast-talking showgirl with a heart of gold, is stranded in an African village when she slips out of her hotel window to beat her bill, and stows away on a Congo riverboat in hopes of reaching another town where a job awaits her. On board, she meets the boat's only other passenger, Dr. Michael Shane, a doctor-turned-rubber planter, and the ship's captain Finch, who offers her the dubious privilege of sharing his cabin.

When the boat blows a boiler, Maisie and Shane find refuge at a rubber company's medical station manned by Dr. John McWade, the doctor who succeeded Shane, and McWade's wife Kay. At the station, Shane denounces his former bosses at the rubber company for their indifference to the health of the natives, and he urges McWade to leave the shelter of his laboratory and make contact with the natives.

Kay, who is lonely and homesick, is on the verge of succumbing to Shane's charms when Maisie intervenes to save the McWades' marriage. After John falls gravely ill, Maisie intercedes once again to save his life by persuading Shane to perform an emergency appendectomy. Soon afterward, all their lives are threatened when the witch doctors incite the natives to rebel.

The fast-thinking Maisie quells the uprising by donning her sequined dress and performing a series of magic tricks, which are highlighted by a rain storm that proves her "power" to the natives. Having fallen in love with Maisie, Shane then agrees to take over the medical station with her at his side. Thus McWade and Kay are free to return to America to begin life anew.

== Cast ==
- Ann Sothern as Maisie Ravier
- John Carroll as Dr. Michael Shane
- Rita Johnson as Kay McWade
- Shepperd Strudwick as Dr. John 'Jock' McWade
- J.M. Kerrigan as Captain Finch
- E.E. Clive as Horace Snell
- Everett Brown as Jallah
- Tom Fadden as Nelson
- Lionel Pape as British Consul
- Nathan Curry as Luemba
- Leonard Mudie as Farley
- Martin Wilkins as Zia
- Ernest Whitman as Varnai
- William Broadus as Third Witch Doctor (uncredited)
- Buddy Harris as Second Witch Doctor (uncredited)
- Darby Jones as First Witch Doctor (uncredited)
