= Wilson Collison =

American dramatist (1893–1941)

- Born: November 5, 1893; Glouster, Ohio, United States
- Died: May 25, 1941 (aged 47); Beverly Hills, California, U.S.
- Other name: Clyde Wilson Collison
- Occupations: Novelist, playwright
- Years active: 1924–1941
- Known for: plays, novels
- Spouse: Anzonetta Moore (1920–1941, his death)

Wilson Collison (November 5, 1893 – May 25, 1941) was an American writer and playwright. He started with farces.

His play Red Dust (1928) was adapted twice for feature films: the first released in 1932 under the same title, and a 1953 version titled Mogambo. Two novels also received second lives in film adaptations.

== Early years ==
Wilson Collison was the son of John B. Collison, a clerk in the Glouster, Ohio City Engineer's Office, and Mary E. Gardner. Wilson Collison abandoned plans to become a scientist when he found he preferred writing.

Showing signs of early talent, he was nine when a Columbus, Ohio newspaper accepted one of his stories. His writing was largely self-developed, as he completed only one year of high school. In his early years, he worked as a printer, a stenographer, an advertising writer, and as a clerk in the wholesale and retail drug business.

== Actor ==
At 18 Collison became an actor with a repertory company that toured small towns in Michigan. He also was a vaudeville performer.

== Playwright and novelist ==
Collison's jump start as a playwright came in 1919, when he co-wrote Up in Mabel's Room and it became a Broadway hit. Collison was working as an $18-a-week clerk in a Columbus, Ohio drugstore when he collaborated on the play with the more experienced Otto Harbach of New York City. The older man was already known as a lyricist. The farce centered on a shy bridegroom's pursuit of an incriminating undergarment which in a single bold moment he had earlier presented to a young woman whom he had temporarily fancied.

Collison also co-wrote two farces with successful playwright Avery Hopwood: The Girl in the Limousine (1919), about a man who is robbed and left in a woman's bedroom; and Getting Gertie's Garter (1921), about a lawyer who doesn't understand the difference between a bracelet and a garter. These had some success in New York. (In 1920, Hopwood had four plays running on Broadway.)

A number of Collison's works had second lives as film adaptations in the 1930s, as the industry expanded with "talkies". His play Red Dust closed after eight performances in New York, and received withering reviews.

But it was adapted twice for films, which had more success. The 1932 film by the same name was set in Vietnam, then French Indochina, a French colony, and starred Clark Gable. Another film adaptation, titled Mogambo, was made in 1953. Set and shot in colonial British East Africa and neighboring areas, it also starred Gable, plus Ava Gardner and Grace Kelly, and introduced British actor Donald Sinden.

The stage version was described this way: "Red Dust, a turgid play," was "a repetitious melodrama ... Another of those plays of the tropics, or anyway the near tropics, where passions are primitive and men wear their shirts open in the front," wrote The New York Times.

Collison's novel Red-Haired Alibi (1932) was adapted as a feature-length film of the same name by Tower Productions. Directed by Christy Cabanne, it was the first feature-length film to include Shirley Temple in the credits.

At the time the movie was released, the 1933 film Sing Sinner Sing was recognized as being loosely based on the 1932 Libby Holman-Zachary Smith Reynolds case. and may have been adapted from one of Collison's works.

The Maisie series of motion pictures, with the first in 1939, was developed from Collison's novel Dark Dame. MGM cast Ann Sothern as Maisie Ravier, a brash American working woman. Sothern played the same role in a half-hour weekly radio series.

== Works ==
=== Plays ===
- 1919 Up in Mabel's Room
- 1919 The Girl in the Limousine
- 1920 The Girl with the Carmine Lips
- 1921 Getting Gertie's Garter
- 1921 A Bachelor's Night
- 1922 Desert Sands
- 1923 Debris
- 1926 The Queen's Taste © 1926-09-10
- 1926 Scarlet Saints © 1926-07-08
- 1926 The Girl in Upper C © 1926-07-02
- 1928 Red Dust

=== Novels ===
- 1929 Murder in the Brownstone House
- 1930 Diary of Death
- 1931 Blonde Baby
- 1931 Expensive Women
- 1931 The Last Witness
- 1931 The Woman in Purple Pajamas
- 1932 Farewell to Women

first called Dishonorable Darling

- 1932 Murder in the Rain
- 1932 Red-haired Alibi
- 1932 Shy Cinderella
- 1933 Millstones
- 1933 One night with Nancy
- 1933 Sexational Eve
- 1934 Congo Landing
- 1935 Dark Dame
- 1935 Save a Lady
- 1935 The Second Mrs. Lynton
- 1936 Glittering Isle

=== Short Stories ===
- The Gray Pigeon Western Story Magazine v038 n05 (1923-11-03) p.105 via: archive.org
- The Black Wolf Argosy All-Story Weekly v165 n03 (1924-12-20) p.343 ("novelette") via: archive.org

== Filmography ==
- The Girl in the Limousine (1924, based on The Girl in the Limousine)
- Up in Mabel's Room (1926, based on Up in Mabel's Room)
- Getting Gertie's Garter (1927, based on Getting Gertie's Garter (play))
- The Girl in the Pullman (1927) (based on the play, "The Girl in Upper C")
- Divorce Made Easy (1929)
- The Right Bed (1929)
- Expensive Women (1931,

based on Expensive Women or based on short story, "Passionate Sonata")

- A Scarlet Week-End (1932, based on The Woman in Purple Pajamas)
- Three Wise Girls (1932),

based on Blonde Baby

- The Crusader (1932)
- The Red-Haired Alibi (1932, based on Red-haired Alibi)
- Red Dust (1932, based on Red Dust)
- Night of the Garter (UK, 1933, based on Getting Gertie's Garter)
- Sing Sinner Sing (1933)
- Smart Girl (1935)
- Bonnie Scotland (1935) co-written by
- Woman Wanted (1935)
- There's Always a Woman (1938)
  - There's That Woman Again (1938)
- The Mad Miss Manton (1938)
- Maisie (1939)
  - Congo Maisie (1940)
  - Gold Rush Maisie (1940)
  - Maisie Was a Lady (1941)
  - Ringside Maisie (1941)
  - Maisie Gets Her Man (1942)
  - Swing Shift Maisie (1943)
  - Maisie Goes to Reno (1944)
  - Up Goes Maisie (1946)
  - Undercover Maisie (1947)
- Moon Over Burma (1940)
- Up in Mabel's Room (1944, based on Up in Mabel's Room)
- Getting Gertie's Garter (1945, based on Getting Gertie's Garter)
- Mogambo (1953, based on Red Dust)
- Maisie, unsold television pilot based on "Maisie" character; aired on television anthology series New Comedy Showcase (1960)

== Personal life ==
Collison married Anzonetta Moore (Anzonetta May (née Moore) Lloyd Collison Atherton Francke 1890–1979), a playwright from Mason City, Iowa.

In May 1941, Collison died at home of a heart attack. He had no funeral, at his request, and his remains were cremated.

On 15 October 1942, in Las Vegas, his widow, Anzonetta Moore, remarried to Edwin Atherton, who died two years later.
