= Gold Rush Maisie =

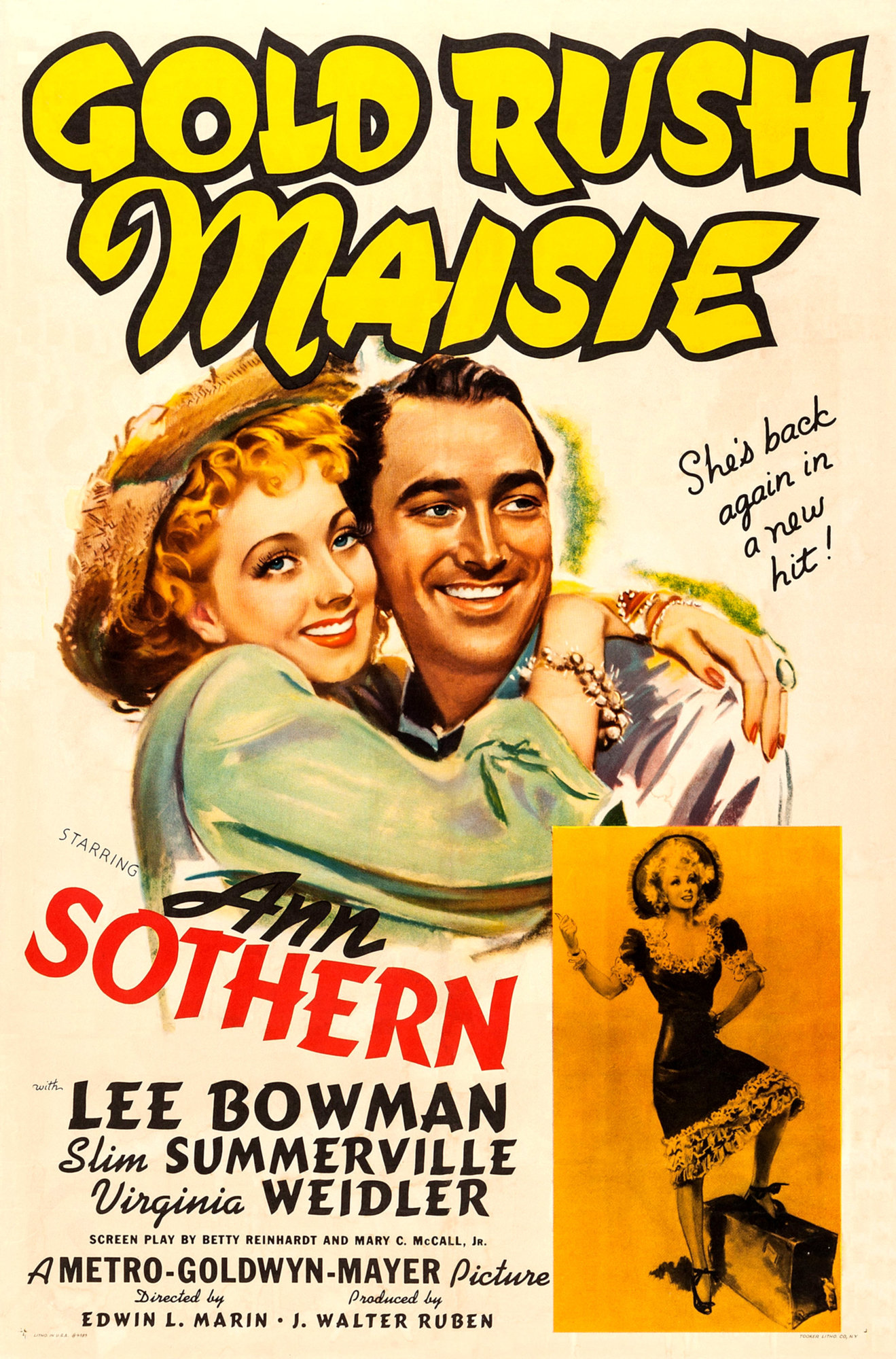
- Theatrical Film Poster
- Directed by: Edwin L. Marin; J. Walter Ruben; Norman Taurog
- Written by: Wilson Collison (story)
- Screenplay by: Elizabeth Reinhardt; Mary C. McCall Jr.
- Produced by: J. Walter Ruben
- Starring: Ann Sothern; Lee Bowman; Slim Summerville
- Cinematography: Charles Lawton Jr.
- Edited by: Fredrick Y. Smith
- Music by: David Snell
- Production company: Metro-Goldwyn-Mayer
- Distributed by: Loew's Inc.
- Release date: July 26, 1940
- Running time: 82 minutes
- Country: United States
- Language: English

Gold Rush Maisie is a 1940 drama film, the third of ten films starring Ann Sothern as Maisie Ravier, a showgirl with a heart of gold. In this entry in the series, she joins a gold rush to a ghost town. The film was directed by Edwin L. Marin.

== Plot ==
On her way to a job at a café in Truxton, Arizona, singer Maisie Ravier has trouble with her car. She makes her way through an abandoned mining town to get to a nearby ranch, owned by a well-educated but rude and inhospitable young man named Bill Anders. Anders is a recluse by choice; his only company is hired hand Fred Gubbins, who is even more misanthropic than his boss.

She meets the Davis family—mother Sarah, father Bert, Jubie, her always-hungry little brother Harold and baby Gladys—picks her up on the road. They were farmers in Arkansas, victims of the Dust Bowl and Depression who first became tenants on their own land and then lost the farm completely, joining the masses of displaced people moving from state to state to state, from one seasonal picking job to another, with everything they possess stowed in their car. Maisie says to Anders later that she has never known that people had to live like this. She is moved by their kindness and gentle optimism, particularly by the patience and fortitude of Sarah, who quietly goes hungry for the sake of her family, and dreams of having a home so the children can get an education.

They all join a gold rush in the Arizona desert, and eventually strike it rich.

== Cast ==
- Ann Sothern as Maisie Ravier
- Lee Bowman as Bill Anders
- Slim Summerville as Fred Gubbins
- Virginia Weidler as Jubilee 'Jubie' Davis
- Mary Nash as Sarah Davis
- John F. Hamilton as Bert Davis
- Scotty Beckett as Harold Davis
- Irving Bacon as Harry Gilpin
- Louis Mason as Elmo Beecher
- Victor Kilian Jr. as Ned Sullivan
- Wallace Reid Jr. as Matt Sullivan
- Virginia Sale as Mrs. Harry Gilpin
- Frank Orth as Harris
- Kathryn Sheldon as Mrs. Sullivan
- Eddy Waller as Ben Hartley

== Reception ==
Writing in The New York Times, Bosley Crowther noted the film's similarity to The Grapes of Wrath, with MGM's "own peculiar brood of Joads", but found the setup to be "strictly synthetic. ... Maisie is a right smart gal, fast with wisecracks and not above a double-entëndre or two in surroundings such as the Congo, but she's definitely out of step in a migratory family like the Davises".
