= Ringside Maisie =

1941 film by Edwin L. Marin

- Theatrical Film Poster
- Directed by: Edwin L. Marin
- Written by: Wilson Collison; Mary C. McCall Jr.
- Produced by: J. Walter Ruben
- Starring: Ann Sothern; George Murphy; Robert Sterling
- Cinematography: Charles Lawton Jr.
- Edited by: Fredrick Y. Smith
- Music by: David Snell
- Production company: Metro-Goldwyn-Mayer
- Distributed by: Loew's Inc.
- Release date: August 1, 1941
- Running time: 95 minutes
- Country: United States
- Language: English

Ringside Maisie is a 1941 American sports comedy film directed by Edwin L. Marin and starring Ann Sothern, Robert Sterling and George Murphy. It is the fifth of ten pictures in the Maisie series. This was Sothern and future husband Sterling's only film together.

== Plot ==
While on her way to a dancing job at a resort, Maisie Ravier is thrown off the train for not having enough money to pay the fare. She is given a ride to the resort by up-and-coming boxer Terry Dolan. Dolan's suspicious manager, "Skeets" Maguire, offends Maisie by telling her that he does not want her "sort" around his protege, despite Terry already having a girlfriend. As Skeets gets to know Maisie better, he realizes his mistake, and he and Maisie fall in love.

When Maisie rejects the romantic advances of Ricky Du Prez, her employer and dancing partner, she is fired. Terry asks her to be the companion to his mother, a wheelchair user. When she accepts the job, Terry asks her to hide his profession from Mrs. Dolan, who believes he is a razor blade salesman. Maisie disapproves of lying, but agrees.

Terry confides a secret to Maisie: he hates and fears boxing, and would rather run a grocery store just like his late father did. Since he will have enough money to buy a store after the next fight, Maisie encourages him to tell Skeets. Skeets surprises Maisie by telling Terry that he has an ironclad contract, and insisting that Terry will take on the champion after the next bout. Maisie ends her relationship with Skeets.

Discouraged, Terry fights poorly and is knocked out in the sixth round. He receives a concussion, and when he comes round he is blind. Maisie brings Mrs. Dolan to the hospital. Dolan tells his mother that there are only three specialists in the whole country who are qualified to repair the damage, but it will take all of his savings. Mrs. Dolan is concerned only about his welfare, and is not concerned about his violent profession. The operation is a success. When Maisie discovers that Skeets flew to Boston personally to fetch the specialist, they reconcile.

== Cast ==
- Ann Sothern as Maisie Ravier
- George Murphy as Francis X. "Skeets" / "Skeeter" Maguire
- Robert Sterling as Terry Dolan, aka Young O'Hara
- Virginia O'Brien as Virginia O'Brien, singer
- Natalie Thompson as Cecelia "Cissy" Reardon
- Margaret Moffatt as Mrs. Dolan
- Maxie Rosenbloom as Chotsie
- Jack La Rue as Ricky Du Prez
- Rags Ragland as Vic
- Oscar O'Shea as Train Conductor
- John Indrisano as Peaches
- Roy Lester as Jitterbug Dancer
- Eddie Simms as Jackie-Boy Duffy
- Jonathan Hale as Dr. Kramer
- Purnell Pratt as Dr. Stanley Taylor
- Larry Steers as Reporter (uncredited)

== See also ==
- List of boxing films

== Bibliography ==
- Fetrow, Alan G. Feature Films, 1940-1949: a United States Filmography. McFarland, 1994.
