= Maisie (1939 film) =

1939 film by Edwin L. Marin

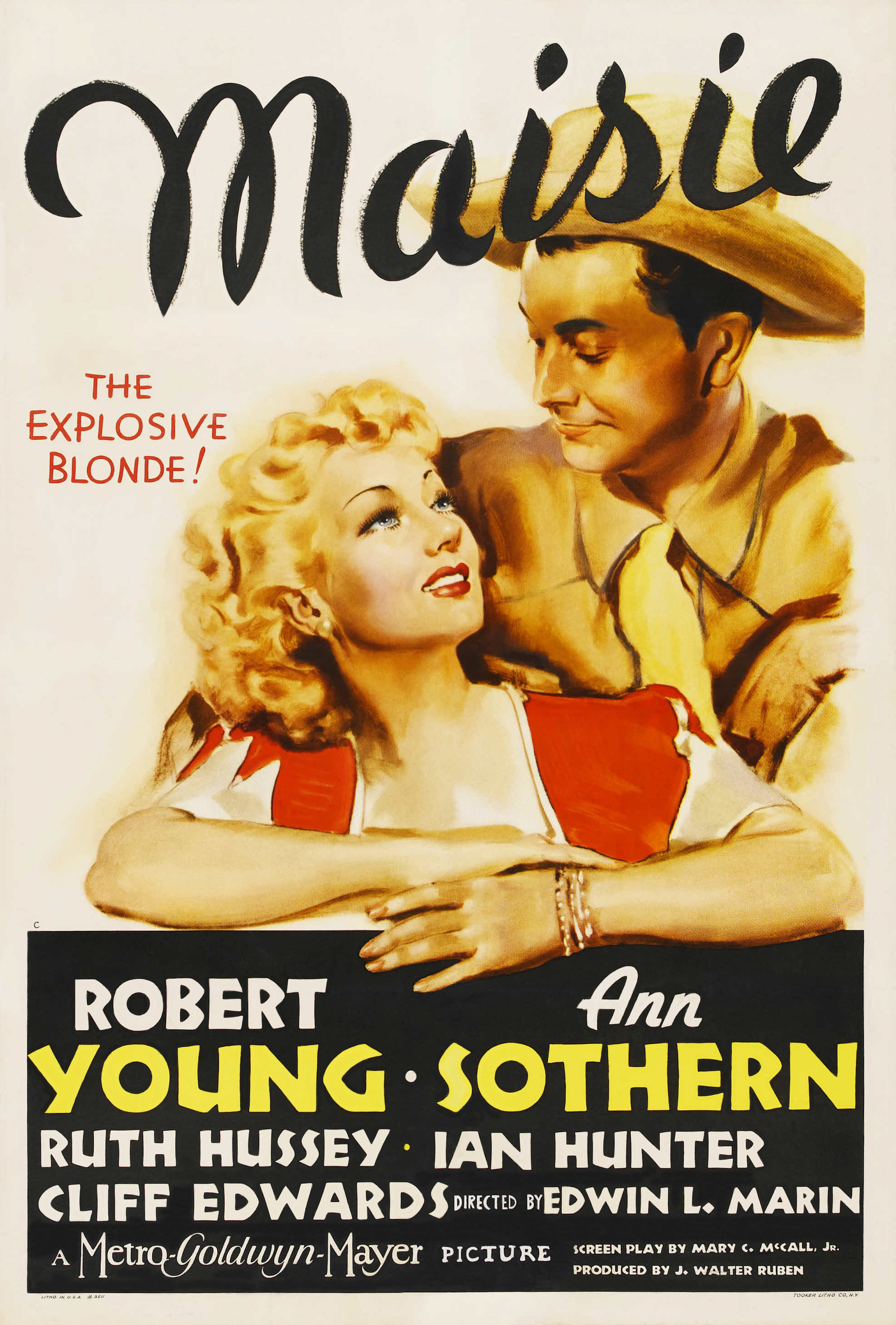
- Theatrical release poster
- Directed by: Edwin L. Marin
- Written by: Mary C. McCall, Jr.
- Based on: Dark Dame; 1935 novel by Wilson Collison
- Produced by: J. Walter Ruben
- Starring: Ann Sothern; Robert Young; Cliff Edwards
- Cinematography: Leonard Smith
- Edited by: Fredrick Y. Smith
- Music by: Edward Ward
- Distributed by: Metro-Goldwyn-Mayer
- Release date: June 22, 1939
- Running time: 75 minutes
- Country: United States
- Language: English

Maisie is a 1939 American comedy film directed by Edwin L. Marin based on the 1935 novel Dark Dame by Wilson Collison. The rights to the novel were originally purchased by MGM for a Jean Harlow film, but Harlow died in 1937 before a shooting script could be completed. The project was put on hold until 1939, when Ann Sothern was hired to star in the film with Robert Young as leading man.

This was the first of 10 films starring Ann Sothern as Maisie Ravier, a fictional character (1939–1947). In Mary C. McCall, Jr.'s screenplay, Maisie is stranded penniless in a small Wyoming town, takes a job at a ranch, and gets caught in a web of romantic entanglements.

== Plot ==
When Brooklyn burlesque showgirl Maisie Ravier arrives at a small Wyoming town, she finds her new employer has folded after a single performance, leaving her stranded and nearly penniless. She persuades Rico to hire her for his midway shooting gallery.

Her first customer is the unfriendly "Slim" Martin, the manager of a ranch. Slim accidentally drops his wallet full of money. Rico picks it up and leaves town. Slim has Maisie arrested for theft, but when a search finds she only has 15 cents, he admits his mistake. The deputy sheriff informs Maisie that as a vagrant, she must leave town by midnight, so she hides in the back of Slim's truck. When Slim returns to the ranch, he is displeased to discover the stowaway.

He has Maisie driven to the railway station the next morning. Maisie meets the ranch owners, Cliff and Sybil Ames, who arrive on the train. Maisie fast-talks herself into being hired as Sybil's maid. The Ameses are trying to rebuild their marriage after Cliff discovered Sybil's extramarital affair with Richard "Ray" Raymond.

Maisie's warm personality gradually overcomes Slim's hostility. Slim's demeanor is the result of past hard luck: he confessed to embezzlement to protect his girlfriend and spent a year in prison, only to discover after his release that she had run off with another man. Maisie also becomes friends with Cliff.

Maisie and Cliff volunteer to drive needed supplies to the old ranch house but their car overturns and Cliff is pinned under the wreck. Maisie limps to the house and walks in on Sybil kissing Ray Raymond. Maisie sends the ranch hands to rescue Cliff, who is not seriously injured.

Slim asks Maisie to marry him, and she gleefully accepts. Sybil privately confronts Maisie about Ray. Maisie informs her that she has told no one, to spare Cliff's feelings, but Sybil remains fearful that Maisie may expose her affair. Sybil lies to Slim that Maisie has been pursuing Cliff romantically, and that she only settled for Slim after she realized that Cliff would not leave her. Slim confronts Maisie. Maisie is insulted by Slim's lack of trust, so she breaks their engagement and leaves.

Cliff commits suicide after realizing his wife is still unfaithful. The death is ruled a homicide, and Slim is accused of the crime. Maisie rushes to the courtroom but she is unable to convince the judge that Slim is innocent. However, Cliff had mailed a letter to his lawyer to deliver to Maisie. The letter details the reasons for Cliff's suicide, exonerating Slim, and names Maisie as Cliff's sole heir. Maisie inherits the ranch and plenty of money to run it.

== Cast ==
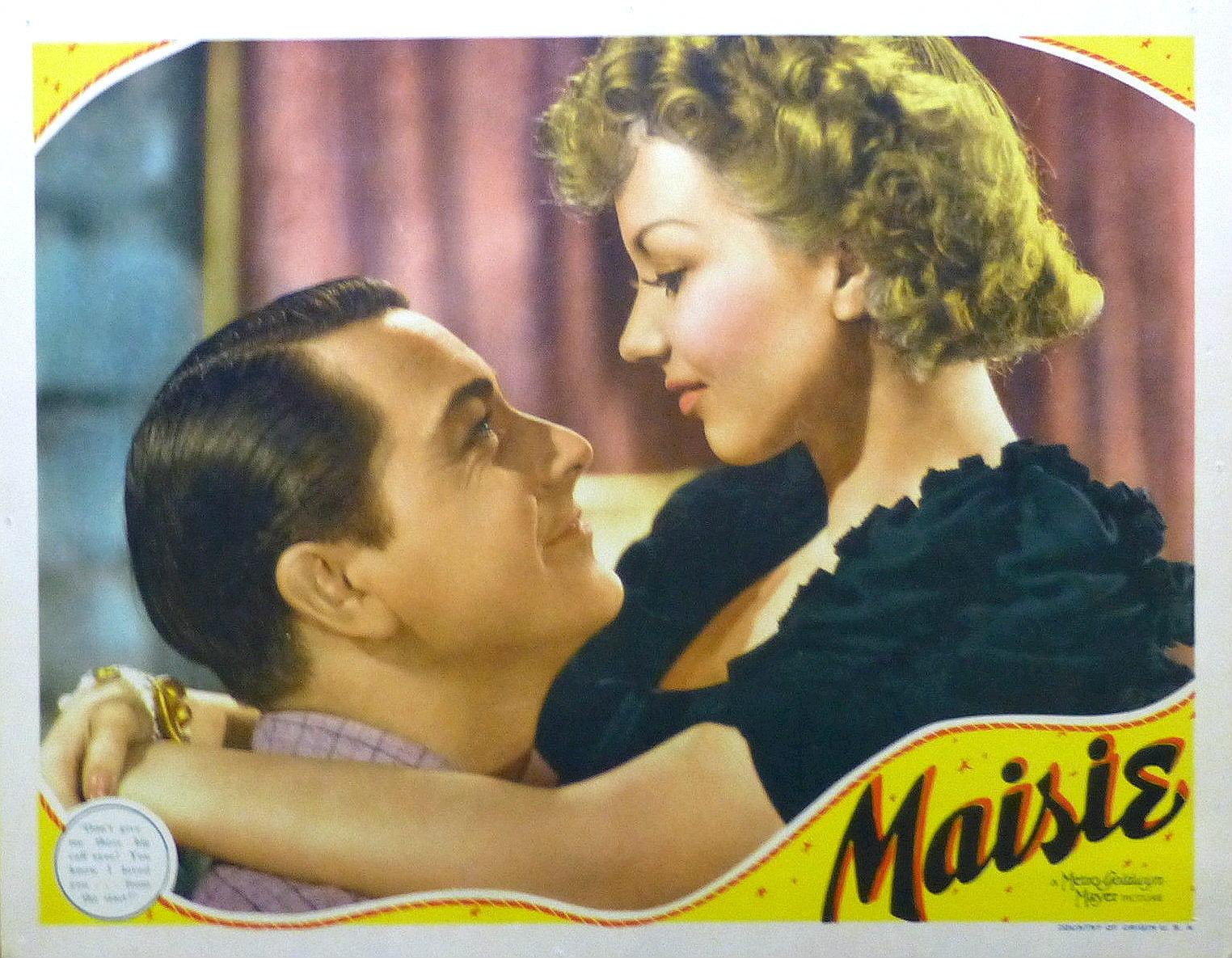
Lobby card showing Young and Sothern

- Ann Sothern as Maisie Ravier / Mary Anastasia O'Connor
- Robert Young as Charles "Slim" Martin
- Ruth Hussey as Sybil Ames
- Ian Hunter as Clifford "Cliff" Ames
- Cliff Edwards as "Shorty" Miller, ranch hand
- John Hubbard as Richard "Ray" Raymond (credited as Anthony Allan)
- Art Mix as "Red" Donnen, ranch hand
- George Tobias as Rico
- Richard Carle as Roger Bannerman
- Minor Watson as Prosecuting Attorney
- Harlan Briggs as Deputy Sheriff Cal Hoskins
- Paul Everton as Judge
- Joseph Crehan as Defense Attorney Wilcox
- Frank Puglia as Mr. Ernie, a barber
- Willie Fung as Lee, the ranch cook
- Charles Coleman as Hicks

== Reception ==
Frank Nugent, critic for The New York Times, wrote, "Don't let all this advertising talk about 'Maisie, the Explosive Blonde' ... mystify you too unbearably. It's just Ann Sothern, who is probably already one of your favorite flouncers, flouncing through an unconventional Western comedy ... Incidentally, the character of Maisie is, as promised, 'explosive.' Miss Sothern, hitherto a reasonably restrained actress, throws left hooks, gags and fits of temperament with surprising abandon."

== Radio series ==
A concurrent spin-off radio series, The Adventures of Maisie, also starring Ann Sothern in the leading role, was launched in 1945.
