= Swing Shift Maisie =

1943 film by Norman Z. McLeod

- Directed by: Norman Z. McLeod
- Written by: Wilson Collison; Robert Halff; Mary C. McCall Jr.
- Produced by: George Haight
- Starring: Ann Sothern; James Craig; Jean Rogers
- Cinematography: Harry Stradling Sr.
- Edited by: Elmo Veron
- Music by: Lennie Hayton
- Distributed by: Metro-Goldwyn-Mayer
- Release date: October 1, 1943
- Running time: 87 minutes
- Language: English

Swing Shift Maisie (also known as Swing It, Maisie) is a 1943 romantic comedy film directed by Norman Z. McLeod. It is the seventh in a series of 10 films starring Ann Sothern as Maisie, preceded by Maisie Gets Her Man (1942) and followed by Maisie Goes to Reno (1944). Her co-stars are James Craig and Jean Rogers.

== Plot ==
Maisie Ravier loses her job as an assistant in Horatio Curley's dog act as a result of a minor quarrel with test pilot "Breezy" McLaughlin. Breezy gets Curley a job at the Victory Aircraft factory where he works and offers to use his influence on Maisie's behalf too. However, she insists she can get a job there on her own merits. She lands on the swing shift at the factory. Breezy does, however, get her a room at the boarding house owned by Maw Lustvogel. Despite her initial dislike for him, Maisie starts falling in love.

Maisie stops a suicide attempt by failed actress Iris Reed, who lives across the hall, and persuades her to get a job in the same place. Her kindness backfires on her when Breezy is more attracted to Iris. The two soon become engaged.

When Breezy gets his wish to join the United States Army Air Forces, he asks Maisie to look after Iris while he is away being trained. Maisie finds this a difficult task, as Iris turns out to like men altogether too much. When Iris gets fired, she uses her feminine charms to get Judd Evans, a factory clerk, to pay the rent for an apartment in his building. She skips out without paying Maw the back rent she owes, even though Maisie gives her $20 to do so, and she has just received a $100 money order from Breezy.

Maisie finds Judd comforting Iris after another "suicide attempt". She orders Iris to tell Breezy that she no longer loves him when he comes home on leave to marry her. However, Iris secretly accuses Maisie of suspicious behavior to the factory's security department. While Maisie is being questioned, Iris and Breezy drive to Yuma, Arizona to get married. Maisie cleverly confesses to being a saboteur and implicates Iris and Breezy as fellow agents. They are stopped by the police, but let go after Breezy produces his identification. However, Breezy learns that Maisie is being held, even of Iris's shady character, Breezy goes back to Maisie. She is initially unwilling to take him back, but eventually gives in.

== Cast ==
- Ann Sothern as Maisie Ravier
- James Craig as Brian "Breezy" McLaughlin
- Jean Rogers as Iris Reed
- Connie Gilchrist as Maw Lustvogel
- John Qualen as Horatio Curley
- Kay Medford as Ann Wilson
- The Wiere Brothers as Bruno, Otto, and Waldo Smith / Schmitt
- Jacqueline White as Grace
- Betty Jaynes as Ruth
- Frederick Brady as Judd Evans (as Fred Brady)
- Marta Linden as Emmy Lou Grogan
- Celia Travers as Helen Johnson
- Donald Curtis as Joe Peterson
- George Chandler as Ann's Boyfriend's Friend
- Lillian Yarbo as Myrtlee

== Production ==
In Swing Shift Maisie, Ann Sothern was reprising a familiar role as the "gum-cracking, back-talking Brooklyn bombshell". MGM studio bosses knew, however, that the series was a profitable and popular franchise.

Unlike aircraft factory settings for other wartime films such as Captains of the Clouds (1942) that used the Lockheed Vega Burbank factory, Swing Shift Maisie was set in a fictitious "Victory Aircraft". MGM studios had bought two Lockheed P-38 Lightning fighter aircraft for a film project on the air war in North Africa, simply titled "P-38". The project was never realized but one of the aircraft was featured in A Guy Named Joe (1943). The other P-38 appears in the factory scene in Swing Shift Maisie.

Swing Shift Maisie, filmed at Grand Central Air Terminal, Glendale (Los Angeles), also used a Northrop A-17A, Seversky SEV-3 and Douglas DC-3 in some scenes.

== Reception ==
Film critic Theoore Strauss in his review for The New York Times, thought Swing Shift Maisie had become stale, but still saw the charms of the main character. "She is still the hapless little Miss Fixit all too often hurt by the people she helps, the good fairy from the honky tonks who behaves as if the world were filled with nothing but the nicest people. Her taste is not precisely refined. It runs to furbelows, bric-a-brac and ugly little dogs. Her conversation is not always as elegant as it aspires to be. But Maisie has a very strict credo even if it never got beyond the grammar-school stage. Above all she has a heart. Maisie isn't synthetic, but her latest adventure is."
