= Tisha Sterling =

American actress

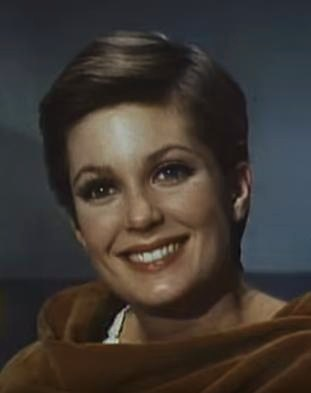
- Born: Patricia Ann Sterling; December 10, 1944 (age 81); Los Angeles, California, U.S.
- Other names: Patricia Sterling; Tish Sterling
- Occupation: Actress
- Years active: 1960–1999
- Spouse: Lal Baum (m. 1965; div. 1970)
- Children: 1
- Parent(s): Robert Sterling; Ann Sothern

Patricia Ann "Tisha" Sterling (born December 10, 1944) is a retired American actress. She is the only daughter of actor Robert Sterling and actress Ann Sothern.

== Life and career ==
Sterling was born at Cedars of Lebanon Hospital in Los Angeles, California. Her parents divorced when she was three years old.

Sterling started acting in the 1960s with an appearance on her mother's television series The Ann Sothern Show. She later appeared in episodes of The Donna Reed Show; The Long, Hot Summer; Bonanza; Batman episodes 43 and 44 as Legs, the daughter of Ma Parker (played by Shelley Winters); The Name of the Game; The Bold Ones: The Lawyers; Hawaii Five-O; Columbo; The New Adventures of Perry Mason and Get Smart.

She appeared in the feature films Village of the Giants (1965), Coogan's Bluff (1968), and Norwood (1970).

In 1987, Sterling played a younger version of her mother's character (in flashbacks) in The Whales of August. She had previously played a younger version of her mother's character in Crazy Mama (1975). Following that role, she appeared in two other films. Sterling made her last onscreen appearance in Breakfast of Champions (1999), opposite Bruce Willis.

== Personal life ==
Sterling has since retired from acting, and works as a florist in Ketchum, Idaho (where her mother lived for many years until her death in 2001) with her daughter, Heidi Bates Hogan. Sterling was married to Lal Baum (1937–1987), the great-grandson of author L. Frank Baum, from 1965 until 1970. Baum died of cancer on July 21, 1987. Sterling is a Roman Catholic.

== Filmography ==
=== Film ===
Year	Title	Role	Notes
1965	Village of the Giants	Jean	
1968	The Name of the Game Is Kill!	Nan Terry	
1968	Journey to Shiloh	Airybelle Sumner	
1968	Coogan's Bluff	Linny Raven	
1970	Norwood	Marie	
1971	The Sandpit Generals	Dora	
1974	Sonic Boom	Lori Truck	Short
1975	Crazy Mama	Young Sheba Stokes	
1976	The Killer Inside Me	Amy Stanton	
1982	Burned at the Stake	Karen Graham	
1987	The Whales of August	Young Tisha	
1992	Dark Horse	Officer Ross	
1999	Breakfast of Champions	Beatrice Keedsler	

=== Television ===
Year	Title	Role	Notes
1964	Alfred Hitchcock Hour	Rachel	"Change of Address"
1965	Dr. Kildare	Sheila Winfield	"Lullaby for an Indian Summer"
1965	Mr. Novak	Myra	"The Firebrand"
1965	The Donna Reed Show	Teresa	"Pop Goes Teresa"
1965	The Long, Hot Summer	Susan Beauchamp	"The Homecoming", "A Time for Living", "A Stranger to the House"
1965	Slattery's People	Cindy Markham	"Of Damon, Pythias, and Sleeping Dogs"
1966	Vacation Playhouse	Elsie Stanhope	"Frank Merriwell"
1966	Batman	Legs	"The Greatest Mother of Them All", "Ma Parker"
1966	T.H.E. Cat	Phoebe	"Curtains for Miss Winslow"
1967	Get Smart	Miss U.S.A.	"The Girls from KAOS"
1967	The Road West	Tassie	"Eleven Miles to Eden"
1967	Run for Your Life	Tia	"It Could Only Happen in Rome"
1968	Bonanza	Laura Jean Pollard	"Star Crossed"
1968	It Takes a Thief	Madame Trish Marcu	"Birds of a Feather"
1969	The Name of the Game	Niobe Redsmith / Alice Ward	"Love-In at Ground Zero", "The Bobby Currier Story"
1969	The Bold Ones: The New Doctors	Casey Woods	"What's the Price of a Pair of Eyes?"
1969–1971	Insight	Mary	"Exit", "A Man Called Don"
1970	The Bold Ones: The New Doctors	Joan McPartland	"This Will Really Kill You"
1970	Night Slaves	Annie Fletcher / Naillil	ABC Movie of the Week
1970	The Immortal	Julie Dudley / Nancy Dudley	"Paradise Bay"
1971	The Bold Ones: The Lawyers	Joyce Hyland	"The Hyland Confession"
1971	The Virginian	Melissa	"Flight from Memory"
1971	Bearcats!	Beth Parkinson	"Powderkeg"
1971	A Death of Innocence	Buffie Cameron	TV film
1972	The Sixth Sense	Annette Gordon	"Lady, Lady, Take My Life"
1972	Medical Center	Dr. Maggie Craig	"Confession"
1972	Night Gallery	Fern	"The Return of the Sorceror"
1972	Another Part of the Forest	Birdie	TV film
1972	Ironside	Wanda Bolen	"Who'll Cry for My Baby"
1973	Snatched	Robin Wood	ABC Movie of the Week
1973	Hawaii Five-O	Eadie Scott	"Little Girl Blue"
1973	Columbo	Linda Johnson	"Candidate for Crime"
1973	The New Perry Mason	Susan Oriel	"The Case of the Jailed Justice"
1974	The Wide World of Mystery	Kimberly	"Death Is a Bad Trip"
1974	Betrayal	Gretchen Addison / Adele Murphy	ABC Movie of the Week
1975	Caribe	Sue Mallory	"The Assassin"
1976	Kiss Me, Kill Me	Maureen Coyle	TV film
1976	Serpico	Jenny	"Strike!"
1976	Police Woman	Celia	"Bait"
1977	McMillan & Wife	Anna Meridio	"Coffee, Tea, or Cyanide"
1977	In the Glitter Palace	Grace Mayo	TV film
1981	Charlie's Angels	Mary	"Angel on the Line"
1986	The Young and the Restless	Connie	Guest role (3 episodes)
