= Robert Sterling =

American actor (1917–2006)

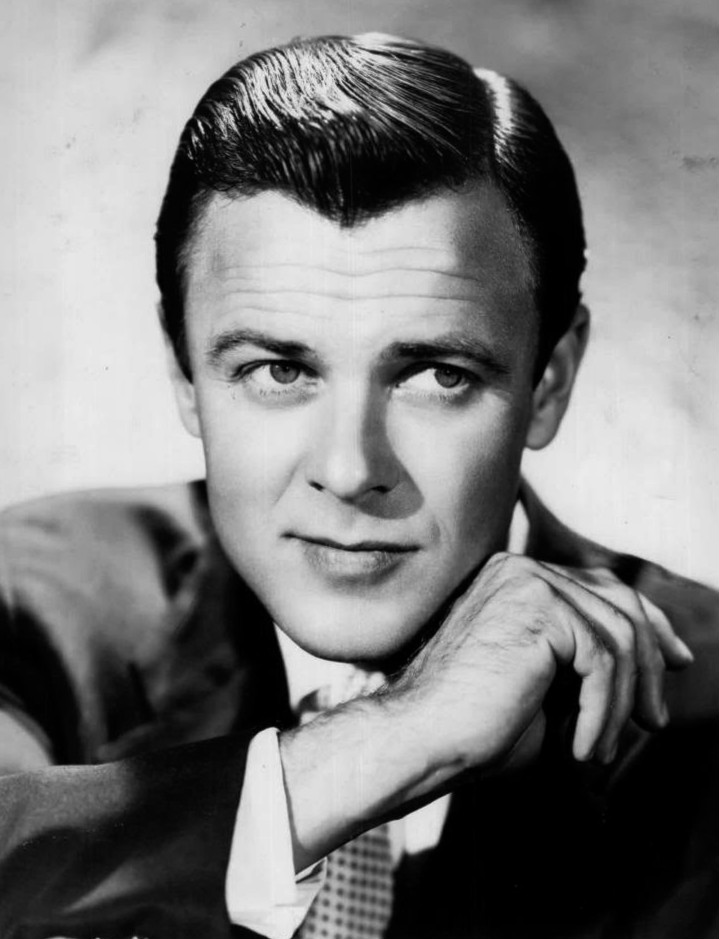
- Sterling in 1956
- Born: William Sterling Hart; November 13, 1917; New Castle, Pennsylvania, U.S.
- Died: May 30, 2006 (aged 88); Brentwood, Los Angeles, California, U.S.
- Education: University of Pittsburgh
- Occupation: Actor
- Years active: 1939–1986
- Spouses: Ann Sothern (m. 1943; div. 1949) Anne Jeffreys (m. 1951)
- Children: 4, including Tisha Sterling

Robert Sterling (born William Sterling Hart; November 13, 1917 – May 30, 2006) was an American actor. He was best known for starring in the television series Topper (1953–1955).

In 1960, Sterling was honored with a star on the Hollywood Walk of Fame for his contributions to the television industry.

== Early life ==
Sterling was born William Sterling Hart in New Castle, Pennsylvania, 50 miles (80 km) northwest of Pittsburgh. The son of Chicago Cubs baseball player William Frank Hart, he attended the University of Pittsburgh and worked as a clothing salesman before pursuing an acting career.

== Career ==
=== Columbia Pictures ===
After signing with Columbia Pictures in 1939, he changed his name to Robert Sterling to avoid confusion with silent Western star William S. Hart. His name was legally changed while he was a second lieutenant attending flight training in Marfa in West Texas in 1943.

Sterling appeared in small parts for Columbia movies, often uncredited: Blondie Meets the Boss (1939), Romance of the Redwoods (1939), First Offenders (1939), Outside These Walls (1939), The Chump Takes a Bump (1939) (a short), That Girl from College (1939), and the serial Mandrake the Magician (1939).

He was in Only Angels Have Wings (1939), Missing Daughters (1939), and a short with Buster Keaton, Pest from the West (1939). Sterling was in Good Girls Go to Paris (1939), The Man They Could Not Hang (1939), Golden Boy (1939), The Gates of Alcatraz (1939), A Woman Is the Judge (1939), The Story of Charles Goodyear (1939) (a short), Scandal Sheet (1939), Mr Smith Goes to Washington (1939), Beware Spooks! (1939), Blondie Brings Up Baby (1939), The Amazing Mr Williams (1939), Glove Slingers (1939) (a short), The Awful Goof (1939) (a short), and My Son Is Guilty (1939).

He was in Nothing But Pleasure (1940), a Buster Keaton short and The Heckler (1940), a short with Charley Chase,

=== 20th Century Fox ===
At 20th Century Fox, he played the lead in Manhattan Heartbeat (1940) and Yesterday's Heroes (1940). He was in The Gay Caballero (1940).

=== MGM ===
In November 1940, Sterling went to Metro-Goldwyn-Mayer (MGM). He appeared in The Penalty (1941) and had the lead in I'll Wait for You (1941), The Getaway (1941), and Ringside Maisie (1941) with Ann Sothern, whom he later married.

He had good supporting roles in Two-Faced Woman (1941) with Greta Garbo and Johnny Eager (1941) with Robert Taylor. Sterling also was seen in Dr. Kildare's Victory (1942) and This Time for Keeps (1942). He was billed third in Somewhere I'll Find You (1942), after Clark Gable and Lana Turner – one of MGM's biggest films of the year. Just as Sterling seemingly was about to break through as a star, he joined the service.

=== After the war ===
Sterling served in World War II as a United States Army Air Corps flight instructor. He got out of the army in October 1945 and MGM announced him for The Last Time I Saw Paris, but the film was not made for several years and not with Sterling. He appeared in The Secret Heart (1946) at MGM.

At RKO, he had the lead in Roughshod (1949). He made an independent Western, The Sundowners (1950), with Robert Preston and John Drew Barrymore and did Bunco Squad (1951) at RKO.

He was appearing on Broadway in The Gramercy Ghost when he formed a relationship with actress/singer Anne Jeffreys.

On television, Sterling starred in "The Man Who Had Influence", the May 29, 1950, episode of Studio One. He also appeared on such shows as The Ford Theatre Hour, Showtime, U.S.A., The Clock, The Web (starring in the episode "Homecoming"), Faith Baldwin Romance Theatre, Celanese Theatre, Lights Out (one episode with Grace Kelly), Betty Crocker Star Matinee (an episode with Audrey Hepburn), Suspense, The Gulf Playhouse, Robert Montgomery Presents, Studio One in Hollywood (an adaptation of The Ambassadors), and Climax!.

Sterling had an excellent part as Steve Baker, opposite Ava Gardner as Julie, in the hit MGM 1951 film version of Show Boat. He supported Audie Murphy in Column South (1953). His second wife, actress Anne Jeffreys, and he also developed a nightclub act.

=== Topper ===
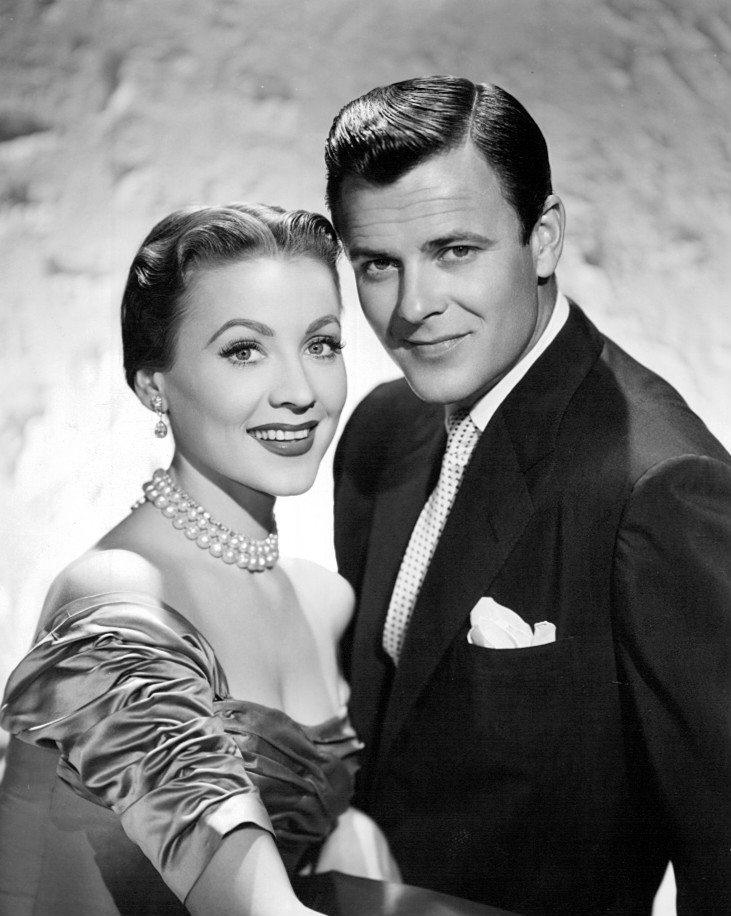
Sterling and Anne Jeffreys (1956)

Sterling is perhaps most well known for starring with Jeffreys as the spirited George Kerby, to Jeffreys' Marion Kerby, in the television program Topper, based on the 1937 original film Topper; Sterling played Cary Grant's role in the TV series, which aired on the CBS Network from 1953 to 1955. Leo G. Carroll starred in the title role. Wife Marion Kerby was referred to as "the ghostess with the mostest", while Sterling's character was known as "that most sporty spirit". Mr. Carroll's titular character was introduced as "host to said ghosts".

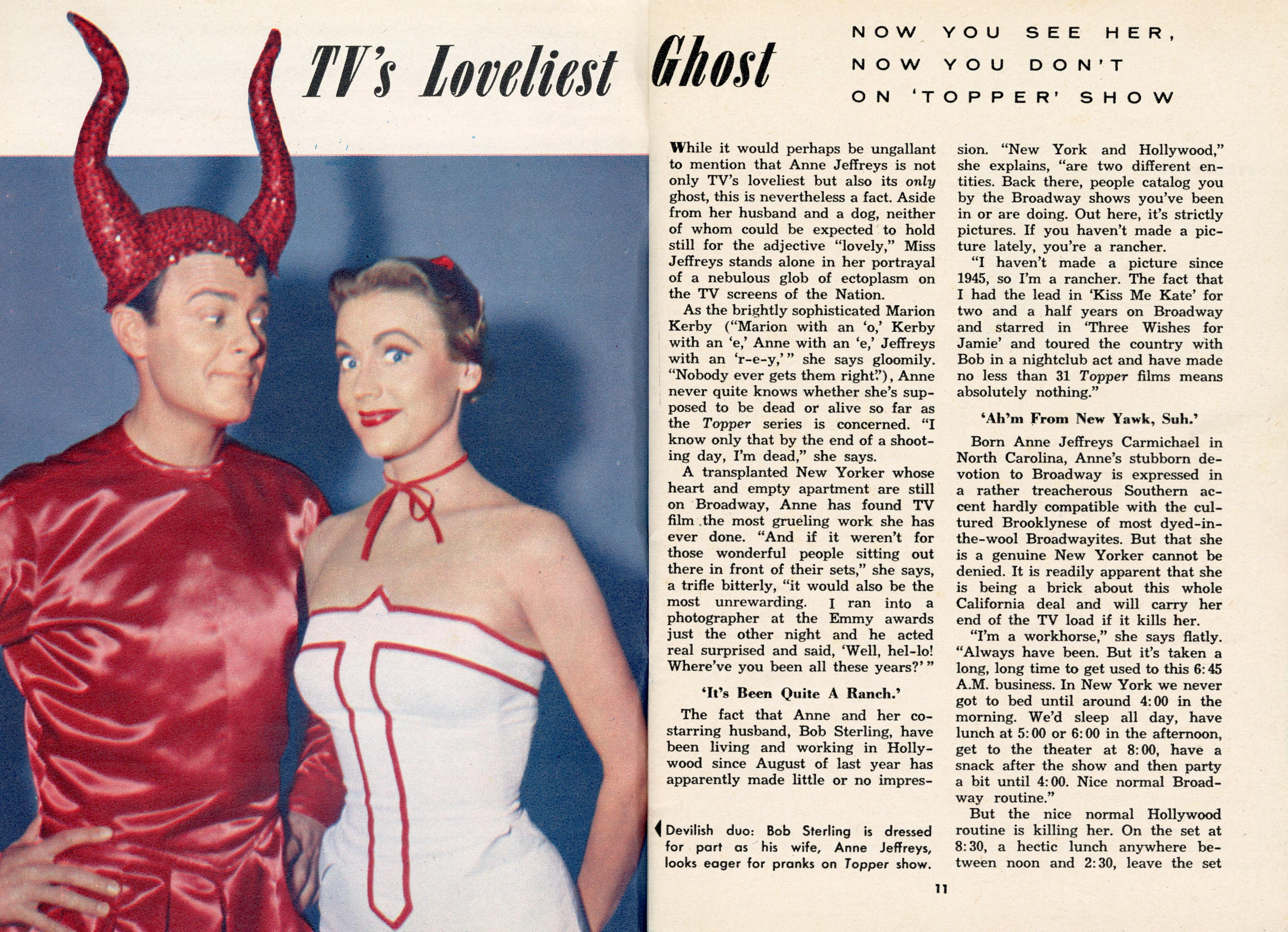
Sterling and Anne Jeffreys in TV Guide, June 4, 1954

In 1955, Jeffreys and he appeared in a TV production of Dearest Enemy, adapted by Neil Simon. He continued to guest-star on such shows as The Loretta Young Show, Lux Video Theatre, Star Stage, The 20th Century-Fox Hour, The Ford Television Theatre, Cavalcade of America, and Telephone Time.

On December 18, 1957, Sterling and Jeffreys played a couple with an unusual courtship arrangement in "The Julie Gage Story" on the first season of NBC's Wagon Train.

=== Love That Jill ===
In 1958, the couple co-starred in another comedy series, Love That Jill on ABC. Sterling and Jeffreys portrayed heads of rival modeling agencies in New York City.

Sterling appeared on The United States Steel Hour, then returned to features at Fox. He had good roles in Return to Peyton Place (1961), as Mike Rossi, husband of Eleanor Parker, and Voyage to the Bottom of the Sea (1961) for Irwin Allen.

=== Ichabod and Me ===
In the 1961–1962 television season, Sterling co-starred with George Chandler and Reta Shaw in CBS's Ichabod and Me.

In 1963, Sterling starred in The Twilight Zone episode "Printer's Devil" alongside Burgess Meredith. He was also in The Alfred Hitchcock Hour and Naked City, plus A Global Affair (1964) with Bob Hope.

=== Later career ===
After some additional television work in the early 1960s, Sterling made only sporadic appearances in later shows such as the hospital drama The Bold Ones, the sitcoms Nanny and the Professor, Love, American Style, Diana, and The Brian Keith Show, the TV movie Letters from Three Lovers (1973), and the miniseries Beggarman, Thief in 1979.

In the 1970s Sterling was a vice president and the spokesman for a company that implemented the software for one of the first supermarket barcoding and computer inventory systems. He later launched Sterling & Sons, a Santa Monica company that manufactured custom golf clubs.

In the 1980s, he guest-starred on the shows Fantasy Island, Simon & Simon, Masquerade, Murder, She Wrote, and Hotel.

Sterling's star on the Hollywood Walk of Fame is located at 1709 Vine Street.

== Personal life ==
Sterling and then-girlfriend, later wife Ann Sothern at a Hollywood Stars baseball game (1942)

Sterling was married twice. His first marriage, in 1943, was to actress-singer Ann Sothern. They had a daughter, Patricia, who became an actress. Sothern and Sterling divorced in 1949.

Sterling met actress-singer Anne Jeffreys soon after his Broadway debut, and they wed in 1951 and remained married for 55 years until his death. They had three sons.

He was a devout Roman Catholic and a staunch conservative Republican who campaigned for and supported Thomas Dewey, Dwight Eisenhower, Richard Nixon, Barry Goldwater, Gerald Ford, Ronald Reagan, and George H.W. Bush.

Sterling died on May 30, 2006, aged 88, at his home in Brentwood, Los Angeles, California. According to the Associated Press, his son, Jeffrey, indicated that Sterling died of natural causes and also suffered from debilitating shingles for the last decade of his life. He was cremated and his ashes were returned to his family.
