= The Red-Haired Alibi =

1932 film

- Directed by: Christy Cabanne
- Written by: Edward T. Lowe Jr. Wilson Collison (novel)
- Produced by: Sigmund Neufeld
- Starring: Merna Kennedy; Theodore von Eltz; Grant Withers
- Cinematography: Harry Forbes
- Edited by: Irving Birnbaum
- Production company: Tower Productions
- Distributed by: Capitol Film Exchange
- Release date: October 21, 1932
- Running time: 75 minutes
- Country: United States
- Language: English

The Red-Haired Alibi is an American pre-Code feature-length film produced by Tower Productions. The film was produced by Sigmund Neufeld. The title is often written as Red-Haired Alibi.

Released on October 15, 1932, it was directed by Christy Cabanne. The movie was based on a novel of the same name written by Wilson Collison. It is the first feature-length film to feature child actress Shirley Temple in the credits.

== Plot ==
A young woman, Lynn Monith (Merna Kennedy), comes to Manhattan and is employed by pleasant and charming Trent Travers (Theodore von Eltz) as a companion. She learns over time that Travers is a gangster. After his crimes escalate to murder, police urge her to leave him in order to protect herself. She builds a new life in White Plains and marries Bob Shelton (Grant Withers), a widower with a four-year-old daughter, Gloria (Shirley Temple). However, one night, Lynn drops off Bob at Grand Central Station in Manhattan, and is spotted by Travers, who threatens to reveal her past unless she gives him a large sum so he can leave the country.

The next night, Lynn meets Travers at a restaurant, as they had arranged—but she refuses to pay, fires a gun at him, and flees. Travers is found shot to death soon after. A waiter overheard part of their conversation, and informs the police. The police confront Lynn at her home in White Plains. Lynn confesses and hands over her gun. However, the bullet which killed Travers was fired from a gun of a different caliber. The police realize that Lynn is innocent.

== Cast ==
- Merna Kennedy as Lynn Monith/Lynn Shelton.
- Theodore von Eltz as Trent Travers
- Grant Withers as Bob Shelton
- Purnell Pratt as Police Inspector Regan
- Huntley Gordon as Police Captain Kent
- Fred Kelsey as Detective Corcoran
- Arthur Hoyt as Henri
- Paul Porcasi as Margoli
- John Vosburgh as Morgan
- Shirley Temple as Gloria Shelton
