= Edwin L. Marin =

American film director

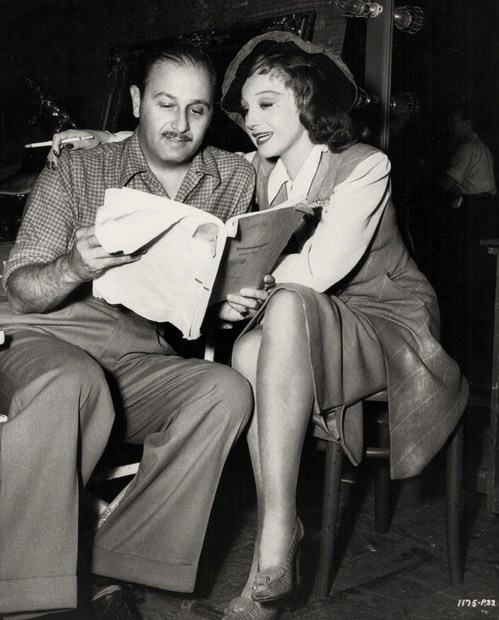
- Marin and Elisabeth Bergner in Paris Calling (1941)
- Born: February 21, 1901; Jersey City, New Jersey, U.S.
- Died: May 2, 1951 (aged 50); Los Angeles, California, U.S.
- Occupation: Film director
- Years active: 1932–1951
- Spouse: Ann Morriss
- Children: 3

Edwin Lawrence Marin (February 21, 1901 – May 2, 1951) was an American film director who directed 58 films between 1932 and 1951, working with Randolph Scott, Anna May Wong, John Wayne, Peter Lorre, George Raft, Bela Lugosi, Judy Garland, Eddie Cantor, Hoagy Carmichael, and others.

== Biography ==
Marin was born in Jersey City, New Jersey, and died in Los Angeles, California. He studied at the University of Pennsylvania and broke into the industry as an assistant director at Paramount-Famous Players Studio on Long Island. He came to Hollywood in 1926 and worked as an assistant director at First National. He started directing in 1932 for Universal.

He was under contract to MGM from 1934 to 1941. In December 1940 he married Ann Morriss, an actress under contract to MGM. In November 1944 he signed a contract with RKO to make two films a year for two years starting with Johnny Angel with George Raft. It was a hit.

Beginning with Abilene Town (1946), he made several Westerns starring Randolph Scott.

When he died he was under contract to Warner Bros. He died in Cedars Lebannon after a three week illness, aged 50 years old.

== Personal life ==
He was married to actress Ann Morriss. They had three children: Denis Anthony, Reese Andrew and Randi Alexandra. He was survived by his wife and children, his father, two brothers and two sisters.

== Selected filmography ==
- The Death Kiss (1932)
- A Study in Scarlet (1933)
- Sweetheart of Sigma Chi (1933)
- The Avenger (1933)
- Affairs of a Gentleman (1934)
- Paris Interlude (1934)
- Pursuit (1935)
- The Casino Murder Case (1935)
- The Garden Murder Case (1936)
- Moonlight Murder (1936)
- All American Chump (1936)
- I'd Give My Life (1936)
- Speed (1936)
- Sworn Enemy (1936)
- Married Before Breakfast (1937)
- Man of the People (1937)
- Everybody Sing (1937)
- Hold That Kiss (1938)
- The Chaser (1938)
- Listen, Darling (1938)
- A Christmas Carol (1938)
- Maisie (1939)
- Henry Goes Arizona (1939)
- Society Lawyer (1939)
- Fast and Loose (1939)
- Hullabaloo (1940)
- Florian (1940)
- Gold Rush Maisie (1940)
- Maisie Was a Lady (1941)
- Paris Calling (1941)
- Ringside Maisie (1941)
- Miss Annie Rooney (1942)
- A Gentleman After Dark (1942)
- Invisible Agent (1942)
- Two Tickets to London (1943)
- Tall in the Saddle (1944)
- Show Business (1944)
- Johnny Angel (1945)
- Mr. Ace (1946)
- Abilene Town (1946)
- Lady Luck (1946)
- Young Widow (1946)
- Nocturne (1946)
- Intrigue (1947)
- Christmas Eve (1947)
- Race Street (1948)
- Fighting Man of the Plains (1949)
- The Younger Brothers (1949)
- Canadian Pacific (1949)
- The Cariboo Trail (1950)
- Colt .45 (1950)
- Sugarfoot (1951)
- Raton Pass (1951)
- Fort Worth (1951)
