= Street of Women =

1932 film

- Directed by: Archie Mayo
- Written by: Mary C. McCall, Jr. Charles Kenyon (adaptation and dialogue); Brown Holmes (adaptation and dialogue)
- Based on: The Street of Women; 1931 novel by Polan Banks
- Produced by: Hal B. Wallis (uncredited)
- Starring: Kay Francis; Roland Young; Gloria Stuart
- Cinematography: Ernest Haller
- Edited by: James Gibbon
- Music by: Leo F. Forbstein
- Production company: Warner Bros. Pictures
- Distributed by: Warner Bros. Pictures
- Release date: June 4, 1932
- Running time: 59 minutes
- Country: United States
- Language: English

Street of Women is a 1932 American pre-Code romantic drama film directed by Archie Mayo and starring Kay Francis, Roland Young and Gloria Stuart.

== Plot summary ==
A man's affair complicates his daughter's love life.

== Cast ==
- Kay Francis as Natalie "Nat" Upton
- Roland Young as Linkhorne "Link" Gibson
- Alan Dinehart as Larry Baldwin
- Gloria Stuart as Doris "Dodo" Baldwin
- Marjorie Gateson as Lois Baldwin
- Allen Vincent as Clarke Upton
- Adrienne Dore as Frances
- Louise Beavers as Mattie
