= Maisie Was a Lady =

1941 film by Edwin L. Marin

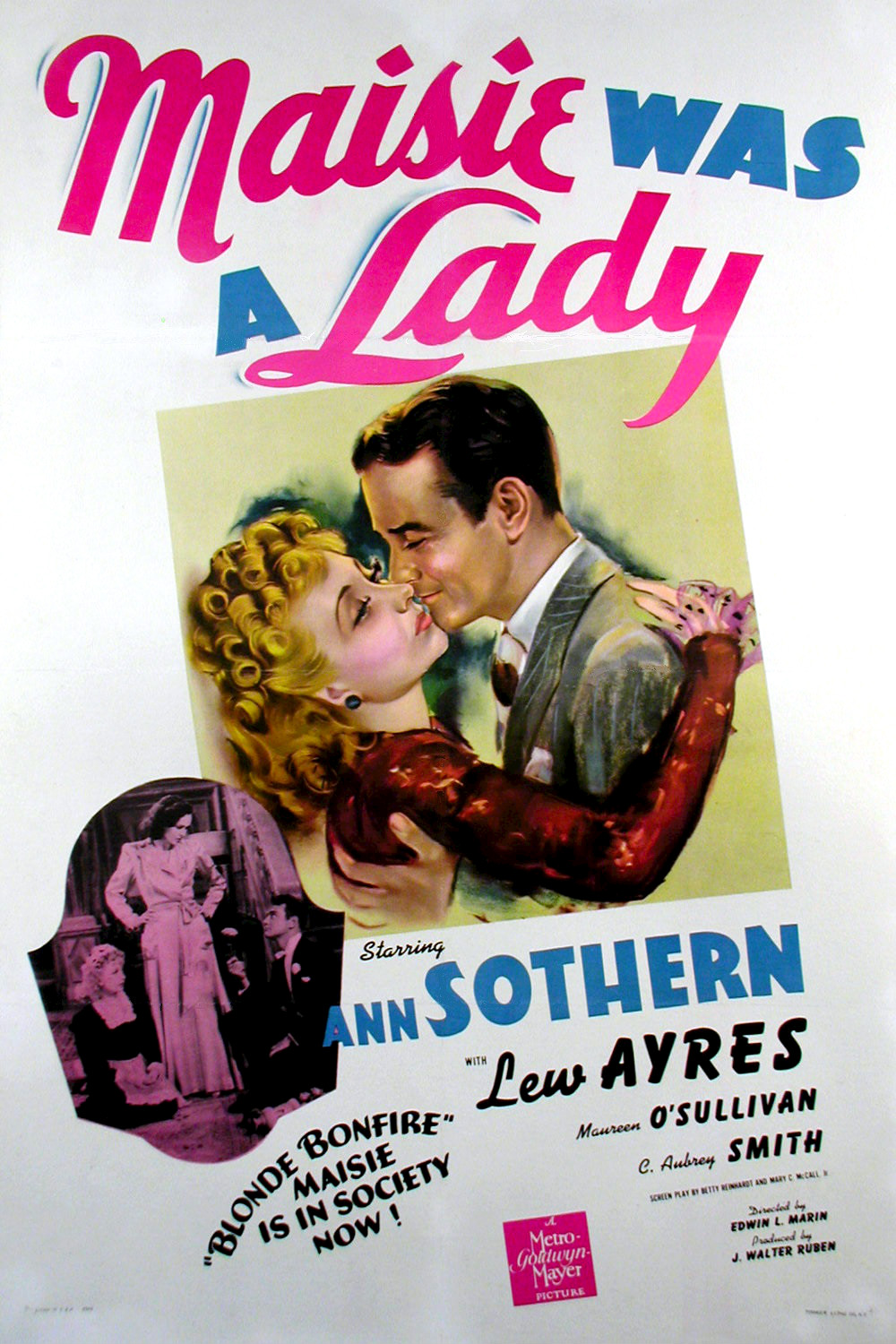
- Theatrical Film Poster
- Directed by: Edwin L. Marin
- Screenplay by: Betty Reinhardt; Mary C. McCall, Jr.
- Story by: Betty Reinhardt; Myles Connolly
- Based on: characters created by Wilson Collison
- Produced by: J. Walter Ruben
- Starring: Ann Sothern; Lew Ayres; Maureen O'Sullivan; C. Aubrey Smith
- Cinematography: Charles Lawton Jr.
- Edited by: Frederick Y. Smith
- Music by: David Snell
- Production company: Metro-Goldwyn-Mayer
- Distributed by: Loew's Inc.
- Release date: January 10, 1941
- Running time: 79 minutes
- Country: United States
- Language: English

Maisie Was a Lady is a 1941 American comedy drama film directed by Edwin L. Marin and starring Ann Sothern, Lew Ayres and Maureen O'Sullivan. Produced and distributed by Metro-Goldwyn-Mayer, it is the fourth in a series of ten films starring Sothern as good-hearted showgirl Maisie Ravier.

== Plot ==
When wealthy drunkard Bob Rawlston causes Maisie to lose her carnival sideshow job as the Headless Woman, he offers her the use of his car to get to town. She is stopped and arrested by a motorcycle policeman who recognizes the automobile. When Maisie tells her story to the judge, Bob remembers enough despite a hangover to admit that he probably did lend her the car.

The judge orders Bob to hire her for two months at $25 a week, the terms of her previous employment. She refuses to accept money for nothing, but offers to work as a maid at the Rawlston family mansion. Bob hands her over to Walpole, the head butler, who has worked for the family for 30 years.

One of the guests, Link Phillips, makes a pass at her the next morning, but she disdainfully rejects him. The other guests ridicule her for her lack of refinement. Bob's sister, Abby, apologizes for her friends' rudeness and takes Maisie as her personal maid.

Maisie learns that Bob and Abby's father "Cap" has been away frequently. When Cap sends word that he will be unable to attend the announcement of his daughter's engagement, Abby is deeply disappointed. Maisie becomes distressed when she learns that Link is Abby's fiancé.

Diana Webley, Link's jilted girlfriend and Abby's former friend, arrives determined to avenge herself. Abby is devastated when she discovers that Link is only marrying her for her wealth, and that all her friends knew about it and secretly were laughing at her. She tries to commit suicide. The doctors have little hope because Abby has lost her will to live.

When Cap arrives, Maisie severely criticizes him for neglecting his children, explaining that Abby sought from Link the love and support she did not get from her father, and that Bob has become a drunk. Seeing the error of his ways, Cap reconciles with Abby. He announces that the whole family will take a vacation together once Abby has recovered.

Maisie and Bob have fallen in love. She considers the possibility, but decides that the social gulf between them is too great. She leaves and joins a vaudeville show. Bob tracks her down, overcomes her resistance, and embraces her.

== Cast ==
- Ann Sothern as Maisie Ravier / Mary Anastasia O'Connor
- Lew Ayres as Robert Rawlston
- Maureen O'Sullivan as Abigail Rawlston
- C. Aubrey Smith as Al Walpole
- Joan Perry as Diana Webley
- Paul Cavanagh as "Cap" Rawlston
- Edward Ashley as Link Phillips
- Hillary Brooke as House Guest
- Henry Blair as Child (uncredited)

== Reception ==
DVD Talk gave it a mixed review: "While Maisie Was a Lady's story is fairly predictable ..., these pros [Ayres and O'Sullivan], along with Sothern, of course, give the slim storyline its only worth. ... By the movie's end, ... it's clear that Maisie Was a Lady's best moments were its lightest―at the beginning of the movie."

== Bibliography ==
- Fetrow, Alan G. Feature Films, 1940-1949: a United States Filmography. McFarland, 1994.
