= Maisie Ravier =

Fictional character played by Ann Sothern

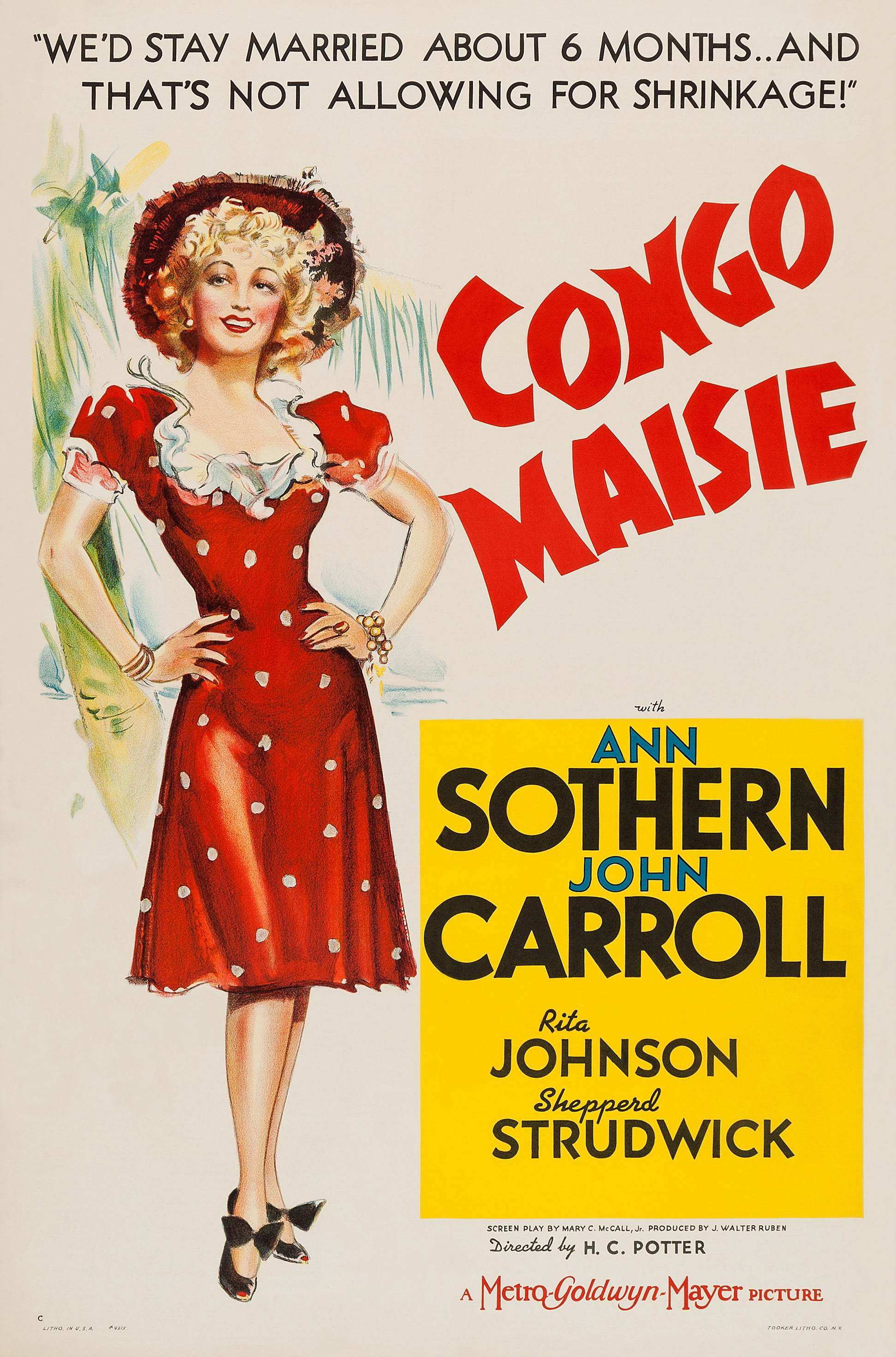

Maisie Ravier is a fictional character, best known as the leading character of ten American films (1939–1947), the Maisie films, and the radio show The Adventures of Maisie (broadcast 1945–1947, 1949–1953). In these, she was played by actress Ann Sothern.

A 1960 unsold television pilot called Maisie reprised the character, with Janis Paige playing the role of the title character.

== Background ==
The concept for the original Maisie film came from the novel Dark Dame by Wilson Collison, and Collison is credited as original writer or creator of the character on many of the other Maisie films. Some sources credit the inspiration for the character as the "Maisie" short stories by Nell Martin, published in Top Notch Magazine in 1927–1928.

Sothern said in an interview that the series was originally planned with Jean Harlow as the star.

== Film ==
After a string of other films failed to attract audiences, Sothern left RKO Radio Pictures and signed with Metro-Goldwyn-Mayer, making her first film for MGM in 1939. She was cast in Maisie as Mary Anastasia O'Connor, a brassy but kindhearted Brooklyn burlesque dancer who went by the stage name of Maisie Ravier.

Maisie brought Sothern her first real success. A string of sequels followed, beginning with Congo Maisie (1940) and continuing until Undercover Maisie (1947). Reviewing Swing Shift Maisie (1943), Time praised Sothern and described her as "one of the smartest comediennes in the business".

=== Films in the series ===
Eight of the ten Maisie films were written by Mary C. McCall Jr. Unusually, there was no continuity from one picture to the next. For example, the first film ends with her marrying the leading man and inheriting a ranch, but in the next one she is single and footloose again.

- Maisie (1939)
- Congo Maisie (1940)
- Gold Rush Maisie (1940)
- Maisie Was a Lady (1941)
- Ringside Maisie (1941)
- Maisie Gets Her Man (1942)
- Swing Shift Maisie (1943)
- Maisie Goes to Reno (1944)
- Up Goes Maisie (1946)
- Undercover Maisie (1947)

== Radio ==
On November 24, 1941, Sothern appeared in the Lux Radio Theater adaptation of Maisie Was a Lady, and the popularity of the film series led to her own radio program, The Adventures of Maisie, broadcast on CBS Radio from 1945 to 1947, on the Mutual Broadcasting System in 1952, and in syndication from 1949 to 1953.

== Television ==
In 1960, Janis Paige took the role of Maisie Ravier in the unsold television pilot Maisie, directed by Edward Ludwig, based on Wilson Collison's novel Dark Dame. It aired as an episode of the anthology series New Comedy Showcase on September 12, 1960.
