= Maisie Gets Her Man =

1942 film by Roy Del Ruth

- Theatrical release poster
- Directed by: Roy Del Ruth
- Screenplay by: Mary C. McCall Jr. Elizabeth Reinhardt
- Story by: Elizabeth Reinhardt; Ethel Hill
- Based on: characters created by Wilson Collison
- Produced by: J. Walter Ruben
- Starring: Ann Sothern; Red Skelton; Leo Gorcey
- Cinematography: Harry Stradling
- Edited by: Frederick Y. Smith
- Music by: Lennie Hayton
- Production company: Metro-Goldwyn-Mayer
- Distributed by: Loew's Inc.
- Release date: June 1942
- Running time: 86 minutes
- Country: United States
- Language: English
- Budget: $424,000
- Box office: $1 million

Maisie Gets Her Man is a 1942 American romance film directed by Roy Del Ruth and starring Ann Sothern and Red Skelton. It is the sixth of the ten-film Maisie series.

== Plot ==
An unemployed showgirl meets an obnoxious comedian and when he has stage fright she gets him mixed up with a bootlegger/scammer.

== Cast ==
- Ann Sothern as Maisie Rivier
- Red Skelton as Herbert P. Hap Hixby
- Leo Gorcey as Cecil
- Allen Jenkins as Pappy Goodring
- Donald Meek as Mr. Stickwell
- Rags Ragland as Ears Cofflin
- Lloyd Corrigan as Mr. Marshall J. Denningham
- Walter Catlett as Jasper
- Fritz Feld as Professor Orco

== Reception ==
According to MGM records, the film earned $824,000 in the US and Canada and $188,000 elsewhere, making the studio a profit of $258,000.
