= Tale of the Navajos =

- Written by: Harry Chandlee; John A. Haeseler
- Produced by: John A. Haeseler
- Music by: Lan Adomian
- Distributed by: Metro-Goldwyn-Mayer
- Release date: March 3, 1949
- Running time: 52 minutes
- Country: United States
- Language: English

Tale of the Navajos is a 1949 American semi-documentary film written by Harry Chandlee and John A. Haeseler who also produced. The film was released on March 3, 1949, by Metro-Goldwyn-Mayer.

== Synopsis ==
A semi-documentary of the Native American Navajos with details based on authentic legends and lore of the Navajo. A Navajo boy and the son of a white trader explore together the ruins of a mesa to find turquoise and discover a way to hidden, rich pastures.

== Production ==
The independent producer spent two years living on an Arizona reservation trading post whilst making this film. Variety named the co-stars as "Jimmy Palmer, paleface moppet and Zuci, Navajo boy."

== Distribution ==
By 1946, the film had been picked up by Metro-Goldwyn-Mayer which released it in Technicolor from March 1949.
