= I'll Wait for You (film) =

1941 film directed by Robert B. Sinclair

- Theatrical release poster
- Directed by: Robert B. Sinclair
- Screenplay by: Guy Trosper
- Story by: Mauri Grashin
- Produced by: Edwin H. Knopf
- Starring: Robert Sterling; Marsha Hunt; Virginia Weidler; Paul Kelly; Fay Holden; Henry Travers
- Cinematography: Sidney Wagner
- Edited by: Elmo Veron
- Music by: Bronislau Kaper
- Production company: Metro-Goldwyn-Mayer
- Distributed by: Loew's Inc.
- Release date: May 16, 1941
- Running time: 73 minutes
- Country: United States
- Language: English

I'll Wait for You is a 1941 American drama film directed by Robert B. Sinclair and written by Guy Trosper. The film stars Robert Sterling, Marsha Hunt, Virginia Weidler, Paul Kelly, Fay Holden and Henry Travers. A re-make of the 1934 film Hide-Out, it was released on May 16, 1941, by Metro-Goldwyn-Mayer.

== Plot ==
Injured while escaping from two detectives who have apprehended him, womanizing gangster Jack Wilson hides out in the country with the Millers, a kind, trustworthy farm family who are unaware of his identity. As Jack slowly warms to the Millers and life on the farm, he falls in love with beautiful Pauline and determines to change his ways and pay for his past.

== Cast ==
- Robert Sterling as Jonathan 'Jack' / 'Lucky' Wilson
- Marsha Hunt as Pauline Miller
- Virginia Weidler as Elizabeth 'Lizzie' Miller
- Paul Kelly as Police Lieutenant 'Mac' McFarley
- Fay Holden as Mrs. Miller
- Henry Travers as Mr. Miller
- Don Costello as Police Sergeant Brent
- Carol Hughes as Sally Travers
- Reed Hadley as Tony Berolli
- Ben Welden as Dr. Anderson
- Theodore von Eltz as Cassell
- Leon Belasco as Mr. Lapagos
- Mitchell Lewis as Alfred 'Al'
- Joe Yule as Little 'Butch'
- Eddie Hart as Joseph 'Joe'
- Jerry Jerome as Pete
- Steve Darrell as Napkin Counter
- William Tannen as Driver
