= Maisie Goes to Reno =

1944 film by Harry Beaumont

- Theatrical Film Poster
- Directed by: Harry Beaumont
- Screenplay by: Mary C. McCall, Jr. Harry Clork (uncredited); Howard Emmett Rogers (uncredited)
- Story by: Harry Ruby; James O'Hanlon
- Based on: characters created by Wilson Collison
- Produced by: George Haight
- Starring: Ann Sothern; John Hodiak; Tom Drake
- Cinematography: Robert H. Planck; William H. Daniels (uncredited)
- Edited by: Frank E. Hull
- Music by: David Snell; Robert Franklyn (uncredited); Lennie Hayton (uncredited); Bronislau Kaper (uncredited)
- Production company: Metro-Goldwyn-Mayer
- Distributed by: Loew's Inc.
- Release date: 1944
- Running time: 90 minutes
- Country: United States
- Language: English

Maisie Goes to Reno is a 1944 American comedy film directed by Harry Beaumont. It is the eighth film starring Ann Sothern as Maisie Ravier, preceded by Swing Shift Maisie and followed by Up Goes Maisie. John Hodiak plays her love interest in this 1944 romantic comedy.

== Plot ==
Overworked World War II riveter Maisie Ravier becomes irritable and starts involuntarily winking at people, so the factory's doctor prescribes a two-week vacation with pay. She runs into her friend and bandleader Tommy Cutter, who wants her to sing for two weeks in Reno.

When she goes to the bus station, she encounters Sergeant Bill Fullerton, who is also going to Reno. He wants to stop his wealthy wife, Gloria, from divorcing him. When his leave is canceled because his unit is relocating, he begs Maisie to deliver a letter to Gloria in person.

In Reno, blackjack dealer "Flip" Hennahan knows where Gloria is staying and drives Maisie to the isolated resort. However, Maisie is fooled into believing that Gloria's private secretary, "Wini" Ashbourne, is Gloria. Wini and Gloria's business manager, Roger Pelham, want the divorce to go through for their own (never explained) reasons. They get J. E. Clave to forge another letter to give Gloria the impression that Bill only married her for her money.

In between her blossoming romance with Flip, Maisie discovers she has been duped and sets out to get evidence to convince Gloria that she is being manipulated. She obtains a blotter on which Clave practiced his forgery, but Clave finds out and the crooked trio retrieve the evidence and burn it. Meanwhile, the confused Flip starts thinking that Maisie is having a nervous breakdown.

When Bill telephones Maisie, she strongly urges him to come to Reno before it is too late. Meanwhile, she enlists love-smitten hotel bellboy Jerry into helping kidnap Gloria. She gets caught, but Flip convinces the police that Maisie is not in her right mind and has her released into his custody. When Bill shows up, however, Maisie rushes off with him to the courthouse, where husband and wife are reunited and everything is sorted out.

== Cast ==
- Ann Sothern as Maisie Ravier
- John Hodiak as Philip Francis "Flip" Hennahan
- Tom Drake as Sgt. Bill Fullerton
- Marta Linden as Winifred "Wini" Ashbourne
- Paul Cavanagh as Roger Pelham
- Ava Gardner as Gloria Fullerton
- Bernard Nedell as J. E. Clave
- Roland Dupree as Jerry
- Chick Chandler as Tommy Cutter
- Bunny Waters as Elaine
- Donald Meek as Mr. Parsons
- Ray Walker as Bus Ticket Clerk
