= Ann Sothern =

American actress (1909–2001)

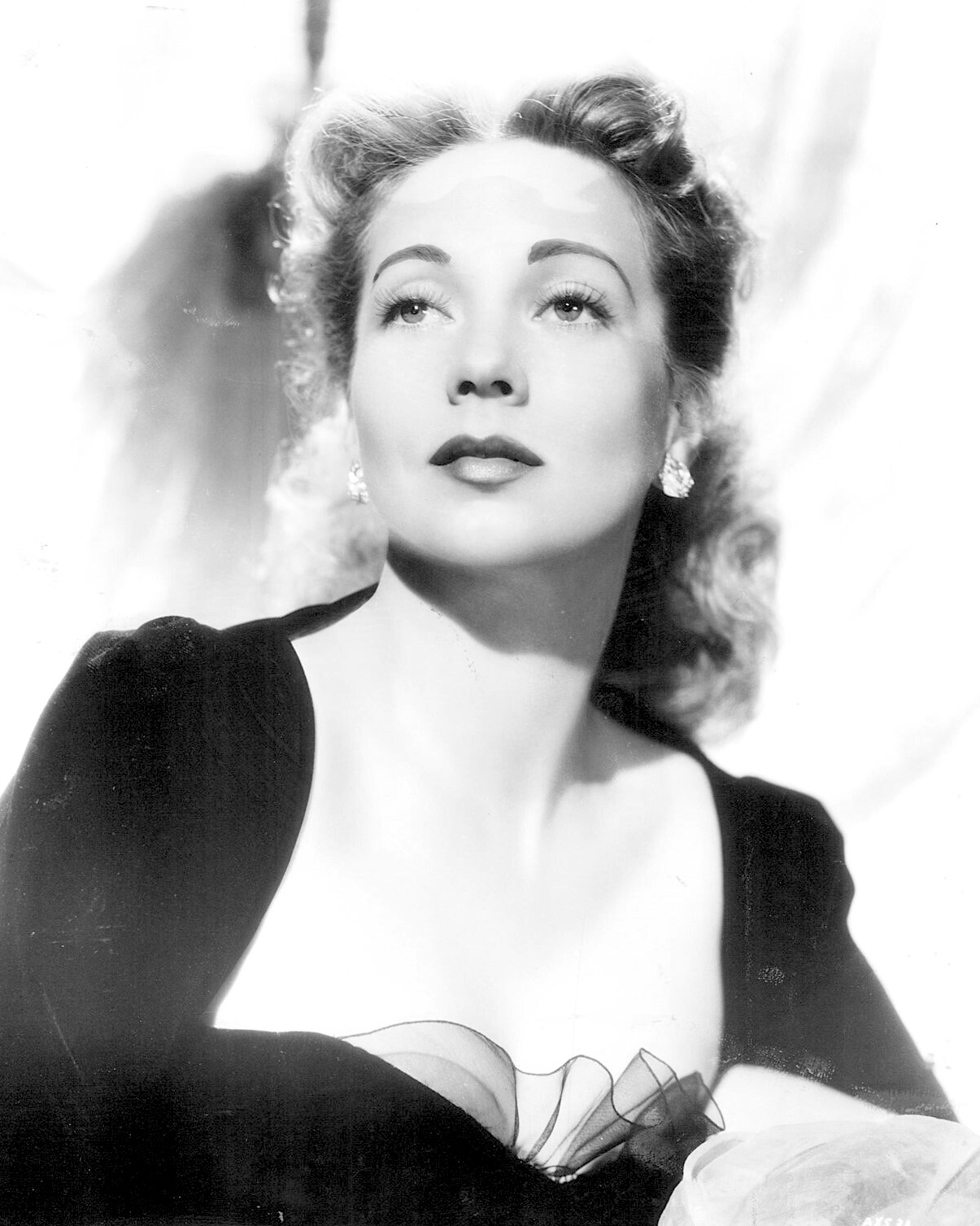
- Sothern in 1943
- Born: Harriette Arlene Lake; January 22, 1909; Valley City, North Dakota, U.S.
- Died: March 15, 2001 (aged 92); Ketchum, Idaho, U.S.
- Resting place: Ketchum Cemetery
- Other names: Harriet Byron; Harriet Lake
- Education: MacPhail School
- Alma mater: University of Washington
- Occupation: Actress
- Years active: 1927–1987
- Political party: Republican
- Spouses: Roger Pryor (m. 1936; div. 1943) Robert Sterling (m. 1943; div. 1949)
- Children: Tisha Sterling

Ann Sothern (born Harriette Arlene Lake; January 22, 1909 – March 15, 2001) was an American actress who worked on stage, radio, film, and television in a career that spanned nearly six decades. Sothern began her career in the late 1920s in bit parts in films. In 1930 she made her Broadway stage debut and soon worked her way up to starring roles. In 1939 MGM cast her as Maisie Ravier, a brash yet lovable Brooklyn showgirl. The character proved to be popular and spawned a successful film series (Congo Maisie, Gold Rush Maisie, Up Goes Maisie, etc.) and a network radio series (The Adventures of Maisie).

In 1953 Sothern moved into television as the star of her own sitcom, Private Secretary. The series aired for five seasons on CBS and earned Sothern three Primetime Emmy Award nominations. In 1958 she starred in another sitcom for CBS, The Ann Sothern Show, which aired for three seasons. From 1965 to 1966, Sothern provided the voice of Gladys Crabtree, the title character in the sitcom My Mother the Car. She continued her career throughout the late 1960s with stage and film appearances and guest-starring roles on television. Due to health issues she worked sporadically during the 1970s and 1980s.

In 1987 Sothern appeared in her final film, The Whales of August, starring Bette Davis and Lillian Gish. Sothern earned her only Oscar nomination, for Best Supporting Actress, for her role in the film. After filming concluded she retired to Ketchum, Idaho, where she spent her remaining years before her death from heart failure in March 2001. Lucille Ball, alongside whom she appeared on Ball's program The Lucy Show on multiple occasions, called Sothern "the best comedienne in the business, bar none."

== Early life ==
Sothern was born January 22, 1909, in Valley City, North Dakota, the oldest of three daughters to Annette (née Yde) and Walter J. Lake. She had two younger sisters, Marion and Bonnie. Her maternal grandfather was Danish violinist Hans Nielsen. Her paternal grandfather was Simon Lake, an engineer who helped build the first submarines for the United States Navy.

Her mother was a concert singer, while Sothern's father worked in importing and exporting. Harriette and her sisters were raised in Waterloo, Iowa, and later, Minneapolis, Minnesota. Her parents separated when she was four years old (they would later divorce in 1927). At the age of five she began taking piano lessons. When she was six years old, Sothern suffered significant burn injuries after catching her nightgown on fire while playing with matches. She underwent skin graft procedures for six months to heal the wounds on her arms, legs, and back.

She later studied at MacPhail School of Music, where her mother taught piano. She began accompanying her mother on her concert tours when her school schedule permitted. By age 11 she had become an accomplished pianist and was singing solos in her church choir. At age 14 she began voice lessons and continued to study piano and music composition.

As a teen at Minneapolis Central High School she appeared in numerous stage productions and directed several shows. During this period she entered the annual state-sponsored contests for student musical composers and won three years in a row. After graduating high school in 1926 she relocated with her father to Seattle, where she attended the University of Washington, dropping out after one year. Her mother, meanwhile, relocated to Los Angeles where she worked as a vocal coach for Warner Bros. studios.

== Career ==
=== Early years ===
While Ann was visiting her mother in California, she landed a role in the Warner Bros. revue The Show of Shows. She made a screen test for MGM and signed a six-month contract. Appearing only in bit parts and walk-on roles, she soon grew frustrated. She then met Florenz Ziegfeld at a party, who offered her a role in one of his productions. When MGM decided not to pick up her option, she moved to New York City to take Ziegfeld up on his offer.

On Broadway in 1931 she had leading roles in America's Sweetheart and Everybody's Welcome.

=== Film and radio ===
In 1934 she signed a contract with Columbia Pictures. Harry Cohn changed her name to Ann Sothern. "Ann" was chosen in honor of her mother, and "Sothern" was chosen for Shakespearean actor E. H. Sothern. At Columbia she mainly appeared in B-movie roles. After two years the studio released her from her contract. In 1936 she was signed by RKO Radio Pictures, but when a string of her films failed to attract a large enough audience, she left. Shortly after, she signed with Metro-Goldwyn-Mayer again.

This time with MGM, Sothern was cast as brassy Brooklyn burlesque dancer Mary Anastasia O'Connor, known professionally as Maisie Ravier, in Maisie (1939). MGM had originally acquired the Maisie property for Jean Harlow, but Harlow died in June 1937 before a final script was completed. The Harlow inspiration remained nonetheless in the form of Congo Maisie. This second feature in the Maisie series was based on Harlow's earlier 1932 hit Red Dust. Sothern approximated the Jean Harlow role opposite John Carroll in the Clark Gable role.

After years of struggling and appearing in supporting parts Sothern found major success with Maisie. The film was profitable for MGM, as were the string of Maisie comedy sequels that followed. Box office proceeds from Maisie pictures financed MGM's more costly dramas. From 1939 to 1947 she appeared in 10 Maisie films. A review of Swing Shift Maisie (1943) by Time magazine praised Sothern and described her as "one of the smartest comediennes in the business". The popularity of the film series led to her own radio program, The Adventures of Maisie, broadcast on CBS from 1945 to 1947, then on Mutual Broadcasting System in 1952, and in syndication from 1949 to 1953. Due to her popularity from the Maisie films MGM head Louis B. Mayer paid $80,000 to purchase film rights to the Broadway production of DuBarry Was a Lady especially for Sothern. When Sothern rejected the revised script, MGM decided to cast Lucille Ball (Sothern's best friend in real life). Shortly after the filming of Maisie Gets Her Man in 1942 Sothern was cast in the title role in the film version of Panama Hattie (1942), opposite Red Skelton. Panama Hattie had been a hit on Broadway with Ethel Merman, but the MGM film version was plagued with production woes. After a disastrous preview in November 1941 MGM decided to delay the release to retool the production. The film's original director was replaced, the script was rewritten, and several scenes were reshot. Though the film received mediocre to poor reviews, it was a box-office smash with audiences.

In 1943 she appeared in the seventh Maisie film, Swing Shift Maisie, followed by a role in the war drama Cry 'Havoc'. The next year saw Sothern in her eighth Maisie film, Maisie Goes to Reno, before taking time off to have her first child. She returned to the screen in 1946 in Up Goes Maisie, followed by the final Maisie film, Undercover Maisie. Sothern acted in two musical films in 1948: April Showers, opposite Jack Carson, and Words and Music, featuring an all-star cast of MGM actors, singers, and dancers. In 1949 she appeared in the Academy Award-winning film A Letter to Three Wives for 20th Century Fox. Sothern received excellent reviews for her performance, but the acclaim failed to stimulate her career, which had begun to wane in the late 1940s. Sothern also contracted hepatitis, which she would battle for the next three years. After Sothern became ill, MGM cancelled her contract.

=== Television ===
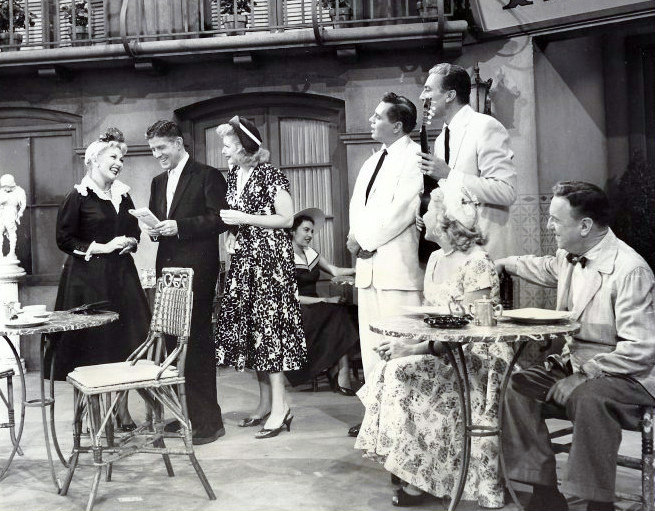
Guest starring as "Susie McNamara" on The Lucy-Desi Comedy Hour, "Lucy Takes a Cruise to Havana", L-R: Ann Sothern, Rudy Vallee, Lucille Ball, Desi Arnaz, Cesar Romero, Vivian Vance and William Frawley (1957)

By the early 1950s Sothern was appearing only in supporting roles in movies such as the film-noir crime drama The Blue Gardenia (1953). In need of money due to her mounting medical bills she turned to television. In 1953 she was cast as the lead in the series Private Secretary. Sothern portrayed Susan Camille "Susie" MacNamara, a secretary working for New York City talent agent Peter Sands (Don Porter). The show aired on CBS on alternate weeks with The Jack Benny Program. Private Secretary was a hit with audiences, routinely placing in the top 10, and Sothern was nominated three times for a Primetime Emmy Award for her role. In 1957 Private Secretary was renewed for a fifth season, but Sothern left after she had what she later described as a "violent fight" with producer Jack Chertok over the show's profits. Sothern owned 42% of the show and later sued Chertok for $93,000 in back profits.

She returned to television the following year in The Ann Sothern Show, in which she starred as Kathleen "Katy" O'Connor, the assistant manager at the fictitious Bartley House Hotel. The series originally co-starred Ernest Truex as Katy's timid boss Jason Macauley, who was routinely outshone by Katy and bullied by his domineering wife Flora (Reta Shaw). Ratings for the series were weak, and after 23 episodes the show was retooled. Sothern's co-star from Private Secretary, Don Porter, signed on as Katy's new boss James Devery. The addition of Porter added romantic tension to the series and helped to improve ratings. In 1959 the series won a Golden Globe Award for Best Television Series – Musical or Comedy. During the series' second season, Jesse White, who also starred in Private Secretary, joined the cast. Ratings for the series remained solid until CBS moved The Ann Sothern Show to Thursdays for its third season. Scheduled opposite the ABC series The Untouchables, ratings dropped substantially and The Ann Sothern Show was canceled in 1961.

=== Later years ===
After The Ann Sothern Show ended, she returned to films with the political drama The Best Man (1964), opposite Henry Fonda and Cliff Robertson and for which she was nominated for a Best Supporting Actress Golden Globe. That same year, she portrayed a prostitute in the psychological thriller Lady in a Cage, starring Olivia de Havilland. In 1965 she had a recurring role on her friend Lucille Ball's The Lucy Show as the "Countess Framboise" (née Rosie Harrigan). After Ball's long-time co-star Vivian Vance announced plans to leave the show, the press speculated that Sothern would be Vance's replacement. Sothern denied the rumors and ultimately the series continued without Vance or Sothern.

In 1965 Sothern co-starred in the TV comedy series My Mother the Car with Jerry Van Dyke. Van Dyke played a struggling lawyer and family man who discovers a dilapidated vintage 1928 automobile in a used-car lot. The antique car speaks to him — in Ann Sothern's voice. It seems the car is the reincarnation of Van Dyke's mother. Van Dyke restores the car to its original condition and takes it home, where it bemuses his family and becomes the envy of a zealous collector. Sothern was never seen in the series; only her voice was heard, reacting tartly to zany happenings around her.

She continued working through the rest of the 1960s in guest roles on television and the occasional film role. In an Alfred Hitchcock Hour episode entitled "Water's Edge", Sothern turned in a most impressive performance. In 1972 Sothern appeared in the Sid and Marty Krofft television special Fol-de-Rol. The next year, she played the domineering mother of a homicidal son in the psychological horror film The Killing Kind. In 1974 she traveled to Hong Kong to shoot the martial arts film Golden Needles, in which she played the part of Fenzie, a mahjong parlor owner. Sothern's next role was in the 1975 action comedy film Crazy Mama, starring Cloris Leachman. For the remainder of the decade, health problems forced her to cut back on her career, working sporadically on television and in stage productions, including a small role in the horror film The Manitou with Tony Curtis (1978).

Sothern returned to television once again in 1985 in the role of Ma Finney for an adaptation of one of her old films, A Letter to Three Wives. Sothern's final film was The Whales of August in 1987. Her role as the neighbor of elderly sisters, played by Lillian Gish and Bette Davis, earned her the only Best Supporting Actress Academy Award nomination of her career. After filming, Sothern retired from acting and moved to Ketchum, Idaho, where she spent her remaining years.

=== Other ventures ===
Over the course of her career, Sothern also managed several businesses and production companies. In the 1950s she opened the Ann Sothern Sewing Center in Sun Valley, Idaho, which sold fabric, patterns, and sewing machines. She also owned a cattle ranch in Idaho named the A Bar S Cattle Company. Sothern owned Vincent Productions, Inc. (named for Sothern's patron saint Vincent de Paul), which produced her first series Private Secretary, and Anso Productions, which produced The Ann Sothern Show.

In addition to acting, Sothern pursued a musical career. During her hiatus from Private Secretary in 1954 she starred in her own nightclub act featured in clubs in Reno, Las Vegas, and Chicago. She then formed the A Bar S Music Company and released her first album Sothern Exposure in 1958.

== Personal life ==
=== Marriages and child ===
Sothern and Robert Sterling at a Hollywood Stars baseball game (1942)

Sothern married actor and band leader Roger Pryor in September 1936. They separated in September 1941, and Sothern filed for divorce in April 1942, charging Pryor with mental cruelty. Their divorce became final in May 1943. Less than a week after her divorce from Pryor she married actor Robert Sterling. The couple had one daughter, Patricia Ann "Tisha" Sterling, before divorcing in March 1949.

=== Health problems ===
Shortly after filming A Letter to Three Wives Sothern contracted infectious hepatitis after receiving an impure serum shot while she was in England for a stage performance. For her recuperation she was confined to her bed where she continued to work on the Maisie radio program. Sothern later said that her illness had restored her faith. With the help of her friend Richard Egan she converted to Roman Catholicism in 1952.

In 1974 Sothern was injured during an appearance in a Jacksonville, Florida, stock production of Everybody Loves Opal when a prop tree fell on her back. The accident left her with a fractured lumbar vertebra and damaged nerves in her legs. Her injuries required hospitalizations where she was put in traction. She was also required to wear back braces. Due to her forced inactivity Sothern gained a considerable amount of weight. In addition to her physical pain Sothern also developed depression. Sothern credited her "optimistic belief" and Roman Catholic faith for getting her through. For the remainder of her life Sothern experienced numbness in her feet and required a cane to walk.

== Death ==
On March 15, 2001, Sothern died from heart failure at her home in Ketchum, Idaho at the age of 92. She was buried in Ketchum Cemetery.

Sothern has two stars on the Hollywood Walk of Fame: for motion pictures, found at 1612 Vine Street; and television, at 1634 Vine Street.

== Filmography ==
Film
Year	Title	Role	Notes
1927	Broadway Nights	Fan dancer	Uncredited
1929	The Show of Shows	Performer ("Meet My Sister" & "Daisy Bell")	Credited as Harriet Byron
1930	The March of Time	Chorus Girl	Uncredited
1930	Song of the West	Bit part	Credited as Harriet Lake
1930	Good News	Student	Uncredited
1930	Doughboys	Chorine	Uncredited
1930	Whoopee!	Goldwyn Girl	Uncredited
1933	Footlight Parade	Chorus Girl	Uncredited
1933	Broadway Through a Keyhole	Chorine	Uncredited
1933	Let's Fall in Love	Jean Kendall	
1934	Melody in Spring	Jane Blodgett	
1934	The Hell Cat	Geraldine Sloane	
1934	Blind Date	Kitty Taylor	
1934	The Party's Over	Lucky Dubarry	
1934	Kid Millions	Joan Larrabee	
1935	Folies Bergère de Paris	Mimi	
1935	Eight Bells	Marge Walker	
1935	Hooray for Love	Patricia "Pat" Thatcher	
1935	The Girl Friend	Linda Henry	
1935	Grand Exit	Adrienne Martin / Adeline Maxwell	
1936	You May Be Next	Fay Stevens	
1936	Hell-Ship Morgan	Mary Taylor	
1936	Don't Gamble with Love	Ann Edwards	
1936	My American Wife	Mary Cantillon	
1936	Walking on Air	Kit Bennett	
1936	Smartest Girl in Town	Frances "Cookie" Cooke	
1937	Dangerous Number	Eleanor	
1937	There Goes My Girl	Reporter Connie Taylor	
1937	Fifty Roads to Town	Millicent Kendall	
1937	Super-Sleuth	Mary Strand	
1937	Danger – Love at Work	Toni Pemberton	
1937	There Goes the Groom	Betty Russell	
1937	She's Got Everything	Carol Rogers	
1938	Trade Winds	Jean Livingstone	
1939	Maisie	Maisie Ravier / Mary Anastasia O'Connor	
1939	Hotel for Women	Eileen Connelly	
1939	Fast and Furious	Garda Sloane	
1939	Joe and Ethel Turp Call on the President	Ethel Turp	
1940	Congo Maisie	Maisie Ravier	
1940	Brother Orchid	Florence Addams	
1940	Gold Rush Maisie	Maisie Ravier	
1940	Dulcy	Dulcy Ward	
1941	Maisie Was a Lady	Maisie Ravier	
1941	Ringside Maisie	Maisie Ravier	
1941	Lady Be Good	Dixie Donegan Crane	
1942	Maisie Gets Her Man	Maisie Ravier	
1942	Panama Hattie	Hattie Maloney	
1943	You, John Jones!	Mary Jones	Short
1943	Three Hearts for Julia	Julia Seabrook	
1943	Swing Shift Maisie	Maisie Ravier	
1943	Cry "Havoc"	Pat	
1944	Maisie Goes to Reno	Maisie Ravier	
1946	Up Goes Maisie	Maisie Ravier	
1947	Undercover Maisie	Maisie Ravier	
1948	April Showers	June Tyme	
1948	Words and Music	Joyce Harmon	
1948	The Judge Steps Out	Peggy	
1949	A Letter to Three Wives	Rita Phipps	
1950	Nancy Goes to Rio	Frances Elliott	
1950	Shadow on the Wall	Dell Faring	
1953	The Blue Gardenia	Crystal Carpenter	
1964	The Best Man	Sue Ellen Gamadge	
1964	Lady in a Cage	Sade	
1965	Sylvia	Mrs. Argona / Grace Argona	
1968	Chubasco	Angela	
1969	The Greatest Mother of 'em All	Dolly Murdock	Short
1973	The Killing Kind	Thelma Lambert	
1974	Golden Needles	Fenzie	Alternative title: The Chase for the Golden Needles
1975	Crazy Mama	Sheba Stokes	
1978	The Manitou	Mrs. Karmann	
1979	The Little Dragons	Angel	
1987	The Whales of August	Tisha Doughty	Nominated Academy Award for Performance by an Actress in a Supporting Role; Final Film Role

Television
Year	Title	Role	Notes
1952	Schlitz Playhouse of Stars		Episode: "Lady with a Will"
1952	All Star Revue	Guest Comedic Actress	Episode #2.24
1953	The Red Skelton Hour	Daisy June	Segment: "Flugelmeyer's Secret Formula"
1953–1957	Private Secretary	Susan Camille "Susie" MacNamara	104 episodes
1954	Lady in the Dark	Liza Elliot	Television special
1955	The Buick-Berle Show	Flora Sibley	Episode: "State of Confusion"
1955	The Loretta Young Show	Guest Hostess	Episode: "Man in the Ring"
1957	The Ford Television Theatre	Christine Emerson	Episode: "With No Regrets"
1957	The Lucy–Desi Comedy Hour	Susie MacNamara	Episode: "Lucy Takes a Cruise to Havana"
1958	The Steve Allen Plymouth Show	Comedian-Mr & Mrs IQ	Episode: "From Hollywood: The Photoplay Movie Awards"
1958–1961	The Ann Sothern Show	Katy O'Connor	93 episodes
1959	The DuPont Show with June Allyson	Martha	Episode: "Night Out"
1964	The Alfred Hitchcock Hour	Helen Cox	Episode: "Water's Edge"
1964–1969	Insight	Fran Henderson/The Actress	Episodes: "Boss Toad" and "Is The 11:59 Late This Year?"
1965	The Lucy Show	Rosie Harrigan, the Countess Framboise	7 episodes
1965	The Legend of Jesse James	Widow Fay	Episode: "The Widow Fay"
1965–1966	My Mother the Car	Gladys Crabtree	Voice, 30 episodes
1967	The Girl from U.N.C.L.E.	Aunt Magda	Episode: "The Carpathian Killer Affair"
1967	The Outsider	Mrs. Kozzek	Television film
1968	Family Affair	Florence Cahill	Episode: "A Man's Place"
1969	Love, American Style	Mrs. Devlin	Segment: "Love and the Bachelor"
1971	The Virginian	Della Spencer	Episode: "The Legacy of Spencer Flats"
1971	The Chicago Teddy Bears		Episode: "The Rivalry"
1971	Alias Smith and Jones	Blackjack Jenny	Episode: "Everything Else You Can Steal"
1972	Fol-de-Rol	Queen Gertrude	Television special
1975	Medical Story	Mrs. Metulski	Episode: "The Moonlight Heater"
1976	Captains and the Kings	Mrs. Finch	Miniseries
1985	A Letter to Three Wives	Ma Finney	Television film

Radio
Year	Title	Role	Notes
1945	Old Gold Comedy Theatre		Episode: "Boy Meets Girl"
1952	The Screen Guild Theater		Episode: "Bachelor Mother"

== Stage work ==
- Smiles (1930)
- America's Sweetheart (1931)
- Everybody's Welcome (1931)
- Of Thee I Sing (1932–1933)
- Faithfully Yours (1951)
- God Bless Our Bank (1963)
- The Solid Gold Cadillac (1965; 1974)
- The Glass Menagerie (1966)
- Gypsy (1967)
- Glad Tidings (1967–1968)
- Mame (1968)
- My Daughter, Your Son (1970)
- Barefoot in the Park (1970)
- Butterflies Are Free (1970–1971; 1972)
- Personal Appearance (1971)
- Everybody Loves Opal (1974)
- The Duchess of Pasadena (1978)

== Awards and nominations ==
Year	Award	Category	Title of work	Result
1987	Academy Award	Best Supporting Actress	The Whales of August	Nominated
1959	Golden Globe Award	Best Television Series – Musical or Comedy	The Ann Sothern Show	Won
1964	Golden Globe Award	Best Supporting Actress – Motion Picture	The Best Man	Nominated
1988	Independent Spirit Awards	Best Supporting Female	The Whales of August	Nominated
1955	Primetime Emmy Awards	Best Actress Starring in a Regular Series	Private Secretary	Nominated
1956	Primetime Emmy Awards	Best Comedienne		Nominated
1956	Primetime Emmy Awards	Best Actress – Continuing Performance	Private Secretary	Nominated
1957	Primetime Emmy Awards	Best Continuing Performance by a Comedienne in a Series	Private Secretary	Nominated
1959	Primetime Emmy Awards	Best Actress in a Leading Role (Continuing Character) in a Comedy Series	The Ann Sothern Show	Nominated
1939	Photoplay Awards	Best Performances of the Month (August)	Maisie	Won
1940	Photoplay Awards	Best Performances of the Month (October)	Gold Rush Maisie	Won
1940	Photoplay Awards	Best Performances of the Month (October)	Dulcy	Won
1940	Photoplay Awards	Best Performances of the Month (August)	Brother Orchid	Won
1940	Photoplay Awards	Best Performances of the Month (March)	Congo Maisie	Won
1941	Photoplay Awards	Best Performances of the Month (October)	Lady Be Good	Won
1948	Photoplay Awards	Best Performances of the Month (May)	April Showers	Won
1960	Hollywood Walk of Fame	Walk of Fame Star - Motion Picture		Honored
1960	Hollywood Walk of Fame	Walk of Fame Star - Television		Honored
2005	TV Land Awards	Favorite Heard But Not Seen Character	My Mother the Car	Nominated
2014	Online Film & Television Association	TV Hall of Fame		Honored
