= Frederick Y. Smith =

American film editor (1903–1991)

- Born: September 23, 1903; Chicago, Illinois, U.S.
- Died: January 18, 1991 (aged 87); Los Angeles, California, U.S.
- Other name: Fredrick Y. Smith
- Occupation: Editor
- Years active: 1930–1964 (film)

Frederick Y. Smith (September 23, 1903 – January 18, 1991) was an American film editor. He worked in Britain at Gainsborough Pictures in the early 1930s before returning to America where he was employed by MGM for many years, editing films such as the screwball comedy Libeled Lady.

== Selected filmography ==
- The Truth About Youth (1930)
- College Lovers (1930)
- Rome Express (1932)
- Britannia of Billingsgate (1933)
- I Was a Spy (1933)
- The Good Companions (1933)
- The Camels Are Coming (1934)
- Petticoat Fever (1936)
- Libeled Lady (1936)
- The Devil-Doll (1936)
- Parnell (1937)
- Big City (1937)
- Three Loves Has Nancy (1938)
- Fast Company (1938)
- Edison, the Man (1940)
- Men of Boys Town (1941)
- Maisie Was a Lady (1941)
- Lady Be Good (1941)
- Maisie Gets Her Man (1942)
- This Time for Keeps (1942)
- White Cargo (1942)
- Young Man with Ideas (1952)
- Holiday for Sinners (1952)
- The Gallant Hours (1960)

== Bibliography ==
- Charlie Keil & Kristen Whissel. Editing and Special/Visual Effects. Rutgers University Press, 2016.
- Roy Kinnard & Tony Crnkovich. The Films of Fay Wray. McFarland, 2013.
