= J. Walter Ruben =

American screenwriter (1899–1942)

- Born: Jacob Walter Ruben; August 14, 1899; New York City, New York, U.S.
- Died: September 4, 1942 (aged 43); Hollywood, California, U.S.
- Other name: Walter Ruben
- Occupations: Screenwriter; film director; producer
- Years active: 1926–1942
- Spouse: Virginia Bruce (m. 1937)
- Relatives: Hutch Dano (great-grandson)

Jacob Walter Ruben (August 14, 1899 – September 4, 1942) was an American screenwriter, film director and producer. He wrote for more than 30 films between 1926 and 1942. He also directed 19 films between 1931 and 1940. He was born in New York City and died in Hollywood. He is interred at Glendale's Forest Lawn Memorial Park Cemetery. His great-grandson is actor Hutch Dano.

== Selected filmography ==
- Shootin' Irons (1927)
- Under the Tonto Rim (1928)
- Sunset Pass (1929)
- She's My Weakness (1930)
- Shooting Straight (1930)
- Young Donovan's Kid (1931)
- The Public Defender (1931)
- The Phantom of Crestwood (1932)
- Ace of Aces (1933)
- Where Sinners Meet (1934)
- Man of Two Worlds (1934)
- Java Head (1934)
- Riffraff (1936)
- Trouble for Two (1936)
- Old Hutch (1936)
- The Good Old Soak (1937)
- The Bad Man of Brimstone (1937)
- Maisie (1939)
- Tennessee Johnson (1942)
