= Kenneth J. Warren =

Australian actor (1929–1973)

- Born: Kenneth John Rathbone Warren; 25 September 1929; Parramatta, New South Wales, Australia
- Died: 27 August 1973 (aged 43); Effingham, Surrey, England
- Occupation: Actor
- Spouse: Eileen Patricia Aylward 1968-?

Kenneth John Rathbone Warren (25 September 1929 – 27 August 1973) was an Australian actor. Known for his bald head and heavy build, he played villainous character roles in British films and television from the 1950s to the early 1970s.

== Early life and education ==
Warren was born Parramatta, New South Wales in 1929. He graduated from North Sydney Boys High School.

== Career ==
Warren started acting on stage in his native Australia in 1949, and made his film debut in 1954's Long John Silver. In the late 1950s, he came to England as part of a touring production of the play Summer of the Seventeenth Doll. Following a successful West End run, Warren chose to remain in the country.

Among his television roles were the Danger Man episode "The Paper Chase"; and as the diabolical film director Z.Z. von Schnerk in The Avengers episode "Epic" (1967); and in The Saint episode "The Fiction Makers". He also appeared in an episode of Steptoe and Son ("Cuckoo in the Nest", 1970) as Harold's supposed older half-brother. In 1972, he appeared in one episode of the ITV show, 'The Frighteners', with Brian Glover called 'The Minder'.

Warren was one of the few Australian actors in The Siege of Pinchgut which was set in Australia.

He played in the 1968 West End musical production of the musical Canterbury Tales, as The Miller.

== Personal life ==
Away from acting, Warren ran a restaurant with his wife Eileen Aylward in London in the late 1960s. They had two children.

=== Death ===
Warren died of a heart attack at his home near London in 1973.

== Selected filmography ==
- Long John Silver (1954)
- The Adventures of Long John Silver (1955, TV) – "Orphan Christmas", "The Dragon Slayer"
- The Condemned (1956, TV)
- Three in One (1957) – Andy (segment "Joe Wilson's Mates")
- The Black Tulip – "Triumph" (1956, TV), "Danger" (1956)
- Kidnapped – "The House of Shaws" (1956, TV)
- A Tale of Two Cities (1957, TV)
- Kill Me Tomorrow (1957)
- Saint Joan (1957)
- Murder Bag – "Case 24" (1958, TV)
- The Caine Mutiny Court Martial (1958)
- Quatermass and the Pit – "The Ghosts" (1958, TV)
- I Was Monty's Double (1958) – F / O Davies
- The Navy Lark (1959) – Brown
- Life in Emergency Ward 10 (1959) – Porter
- The Siege of Pinchgut (1959) – Police Commissioner
- I'm All Right Jack (1959) – Card Player
- A Woman's Temptation (1959) – Warner
- Kraft Mystery Theatre – Danger Tomorrow (1960, TV) – Patient (uncredited)
- Circus of Horrors (1960) – First Roustabout (uncredited)
- Surprise Package (1960) – Lecherous Man (uncredited)
- The Criminal (1960) – Clobber
- Scotland Yard (1961, TV) – "The Grand Junction Case") – Brown
- The World of Tim Frazer (1961, TV series) – Gordon Dempsey
- Doctor Blood's Coffin (1961) – Sgt. Cook
- Strip Tease Murder (1961) – Branco
- The Frightened City (1961) – Title Thug
- On the Fiddle (1961) – Dusty
- Part-Time Wife (1961) – Drew Tierney
- The Boys (1962) – George Tanner
- Life for Ruth (1962) – Sergeant Finley
- The One Day of the Year (1962, TV)
- Nightfall at Kriekville (1962, TV)
- The Small World of Sammy Lee (1963) – Fred
- The Informers (1963) – Lou Waites
- Court Martial (1965, TV)
- Love Story (1965, TV)
- A High Wind in Jamaica (1965) – Capt. Marpole
- The 25th Hour (1967) – Insp. Varga
- The Wednesday Play – "Death of a Teddy Bear" (1967, TV)
- The Double Man (1967) – Police Chief
- Decline and Fall... of a Birdwatcher (1968) – Third Warder
- The Fiction-Makers (1968) – Warlock
- Journey into Darkness (1968, TV) – Joe Blake (episode 'Paper Dolls')
- The Four Seasons of Rosie Carr (1968, TV)
- The Spy Killer (1969, TV) – Diaman
- Leo the Last (1970) – Kowalski
- The Revolutionary (1970) – Sergeant
- I, Monster (1971) – Deane
- Demons of the Mind (1972) – Klaus
- The Creeping Flesh (1973) – Lenny
- Beyond Atlantis (1973)
- Digby, the Biggest Dog in the World (1973) – General Frank
- S*P*Y*S (1974) – Grubov (final film role)

== Select theatre credits ==
- The Circling Dove (1951)
- The Summer of the Seventeenth Doll (1956-58)
- The Rivals (1956)
- The Shifting Heart (1959)
- Write Me a Muyrder (1962)
- The Canterbury Tales (1968)
