= Connie Gilchrist =

American actress (1895–1985)

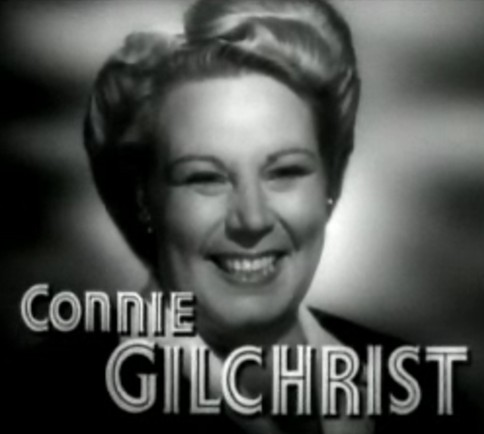
- Frame from trailer for Cry 'Havoc' (1943)
- Born: Rose Constance Gilchrist; July 17, 1895; Brooklyn, New York City, New York, U.S.
- Died: March 3, 1985 (aged 89); Santa Fe, New Mexico, U.S.
- Resting place: Santa Fe National Cemetery
- Occupation: Actress
- Years active: 1917–1969
- Spouse: Edwin O'Hanlon (m. 1922; died 1983)
- Children: 1

Rose Constance Gilchrist (July 17, 1895 – March 3, 1985) was an American stage, film and television actress. Among her screen credits are roles in the Hollywood productions Cry 'Havoc' (1943), A Letter to Three Wives (1949), Little Women (1949), Tripoli (1950), Houdini (1953), Some Came Running (1958) and Auntie Mame (1958).

== Early years ==
Gilchrist was born in Brooklyn, New York and attended Assumption Academy. Her mother, Martha Daniels, was an actress.

== Career ==
Gilchrist debuted on stage in London at age 22 in 1917. In Hollywood, she was signed by Metro-Goldwyn-Mayer to a 10-year contract in 1939.

After playing Purity Pinker in the 1954 film Long John Silver, Gilchrist reprised her role, as did Robert Newton, in the television series The Adventures of Long John Silver. She is perhaps best known today for her role as Norah Muldoon in the 1958 film Auntie Mame and her role in the 1949 film A Letter to Three Wives, in which she exclaims the iconic line "Bingo" while fainting. She was also seen on television's General Electric Theater.

Gilchrist's Broadway credits include Ladies and Gentlemen, Work Is for Horses, Excursion and Mulato.

== Personal life ==
Gilchrist married Edward O'Hanlon in 1922. Their daughter, Dorothy, was also an actress.

She was involved in a lawsuit in 1961, charging that a hair dresser had permanently damaged her scalp when tinting her hair. A news report said, "She contended that she is now confined to grandmotherly roles because her scalp will stand no more dyeing." She sought $50,000 in damages, but received $5,000 ($53,900 today) in a settlement.

== Death ==
Connie Gilchrist died on March 3, 1985 at the age of 89 in Santa Fe, New Mexico. Her husband died on December 13, 1983. She is interred at Santa Fe National Cemetery in Santa Fe.

== Complete filmography ==
- Hullabaloo (1940) as Arline Merriweather
- The Wild Man of Borneo (1941) as Mrs. Diamond
- Barnacle Bill (1941) as Mamie
- A Woman's Face (1941) as Christina Dalvik
- Billy the Kid (1941) as Mildred (uncredited)
- Down in San Diego (1941) as Proprietress (uncredited)
- Dr. Kildare's Wedding Day (1941) as Jennie the Maid (uncredited)
- Married Bachelor (1941) as Mother with Baby on Train (uncredited)
- H. M. Pulham, Esq. (1941) as Tillie, Elevator Operator (uncredited)
- Johnny Eager (1941) as Peg
- Born to Sing (1942) as Welfare Worker
- This Time for Keeps (1942) as Miss Nichols
- We Were Dancing (1942) as Olive Ransome
- Sunday Punch (1942) as Ma Galestrum
- Tortilla Flat (1942) as Mrs. Torrelli
- Grand Central Murder (1942) as Pearl Delroy
- Apache Trail (1942) as Señora Martinez
- The War Against Mrs. Hadley (1942) as Cook
- The Human Comedy (1943) (listed in the cast, but did not appear onscreen)
- Presenting Lily Mars (1943) as Frankie
- Thousands Cheer (1943)
- Swing Shift Maisie (1943) as Maw Lustvogel
- Cry 'Havoc' (1943) as Sadie
- See Here, Private Hargrove (1944) (listed in the cast, but did not appear onscreen)
- The Heavenly Body (1944) as Beulah - 'Delia Murphy'
- Rationing (1944) as Mrs. Porter
- Patrolling the Ether (1944, Short) as Phillip's Mother (uncredited)
- Important Business (1944, Short) as Miss Larkin (uncredited)
- Andy Hardy's Blonde Trouble (1944) as Mrs. Gordon (uncredited)
- The Seventh Cross (1944) as Frau Binder (uncredited)
- The Thin Man Goes Home (1944) as Woman on Train with Baby (uncredited)
- Nothing but Trouble (1944) as Mrs. Flannigan
- Music for Millions (1944) as Travelers Aid Woman
- The Valley of Decision (1945) as The Scotts' Cook (uncredited)
- Junior Miss (1945) as Hilda
- Up Goes Maisie (1946) as Cleaning Lady (uncredited)
- Young Widow (1946) as Aunt Cissie
- Bad Bascomb (1946) as Annie Freemont
- Faithful in My Fashion (1946) as Mrs. Murphy
- A Really Important Person (1947, Short) as Mrs. Reilly
- The Hucksters (1947) as Betty as Switchboard Operator
- Song of the Thin Man (1947) as Bertha
- The Unfinished Dance (1947) as Josie's Mother (uncredited)
- Good News (1947) as Cora, the cook
- Tenth Avenue Angel (1948) as Mrs. Murphy
- The Bride Goes Wild (1948) as Nurse Tooker (uncredited)
- The Big City (1948) as Martha
- Luxury Liner (1948) as Bertha
- Chicken Every Sunday (1949) as Millie Moon
- A Letter to Three Wives (1949) as Mrs. Ruby Finney
- Act of Violence (1949) as Martha Finney
- Little Women (1949) as Mrs. Kirke
- The Story of Molly X (1949) as Dawn
- Buccaneer's Girl (1950) as Vegetable Woman
- Stars in My Crown (1950) as Sarah Isbell
- A Ticket to Tomahawk (1950) as Madame Adelaide
- Louisa (1950) as Housekeeper Gladys
- Peggy (1950) as Miss Zim
- The Killer That Stalked New York (1950) as Belle
- Undercover Girl (1950) as Capt. Sadie Parker
- Tripoli (1950) as Henriette
- Thunder on the Hill (1951) as Sister Josephine
- Chain of Circumstance (1951) as Mrs. Mullins
- Here Comes the Groom (1951) as Ma Jones
- One Big Affair (1952) as Miss Marple
- Flesh and Fury (1952) as Mrs. Richardson
- The Half-Breed (1952) as Ma Higgins
- Houdini (1953) as Mrs. Shultz
- The Great Diamond Robbery (1954) as Blonde
- It Should Happen to You (1954) as Mrs. Riker
- The Far Country (1954) as Hominy
- Long John Silver (1954) as Purity Pinker
- The Man in the Gray Flannel Suit (1956) as Mrs. Manter
- Machine-Gun Kelly (1958) as "Ma" Becker
- Auntie Mame (1958) as Norah Muldoon
- Some Came Running (1958) as Jane Barclay
- Say One for Me (1959) as Mary
- Swingin' Along (1961) as Aunt Sophie
- The Interns (1962) as Nurse Connie Dean
- The Misadventures of Merlin Jones (1964) as Mrs. Gossett
- A Tiger Walks (1964) as Liddy Lewis
- A House Is Not a Home (1964) as Hattie Miller
- Two on a Guillotine (1965) as Ramona Ryerdon
- Sylvia (1965) as Molly Baxter (uncredited)
- The Monkey's Uncle (1965) as Mrs. Gossett
- Fluffy (1965) as Maid
- Tickle Me (1965) as Hilda
- Some Kind of a Nut (1969) as Mrs. Boland (uncredited) (final film role)

== Television credits ==
- Leave It to Beaver (1957) as Minerva, a maid, in the episode "Captain Jack"
- The Life and Legend of Wyatt Earp (1959) as Pinkie Thomason in episode "Pinkeytown"
- The Restless Gun (1958) as Aunt Emma in Episode "Aunt Emma"
- The Real McCoys (1961) as Mrs. Jensen
- The Tall Man as Big Mamacita in the episode "The Great Western" (1961)
- Going My Way, as Mrs. Reardon in "Blessed Are the Meek" (1963)
- Alfred Hitchcock Presents (1962) (Season 7 Episode 15: "The Door Without a Key") as Maggie Vanderman
- The Alfred Hitchcock Hour (1963) (Season 1 Episode 25: "The Long Silence") as Emma
- The Alfred Hitchcock Hour (1963) (Season 2 Episode 1: "A Home Away from Home") as Martha
- Perry Mason (1964) (Season 7, Episode 2: "The Case of the Frightened Fisherman" as Mrs Pennyworth
- The Twilight Zone, as Mrs. Feeney in "In Praise of Pip" (1963)
- Daniel Boone, as Keziah Tench in "Cains Birthday" (1965)
- Perry Mason as Natasha in “The Case of the Scarlet Scandal” (1966)
