= Wyoming (1940 film) =

1940 film

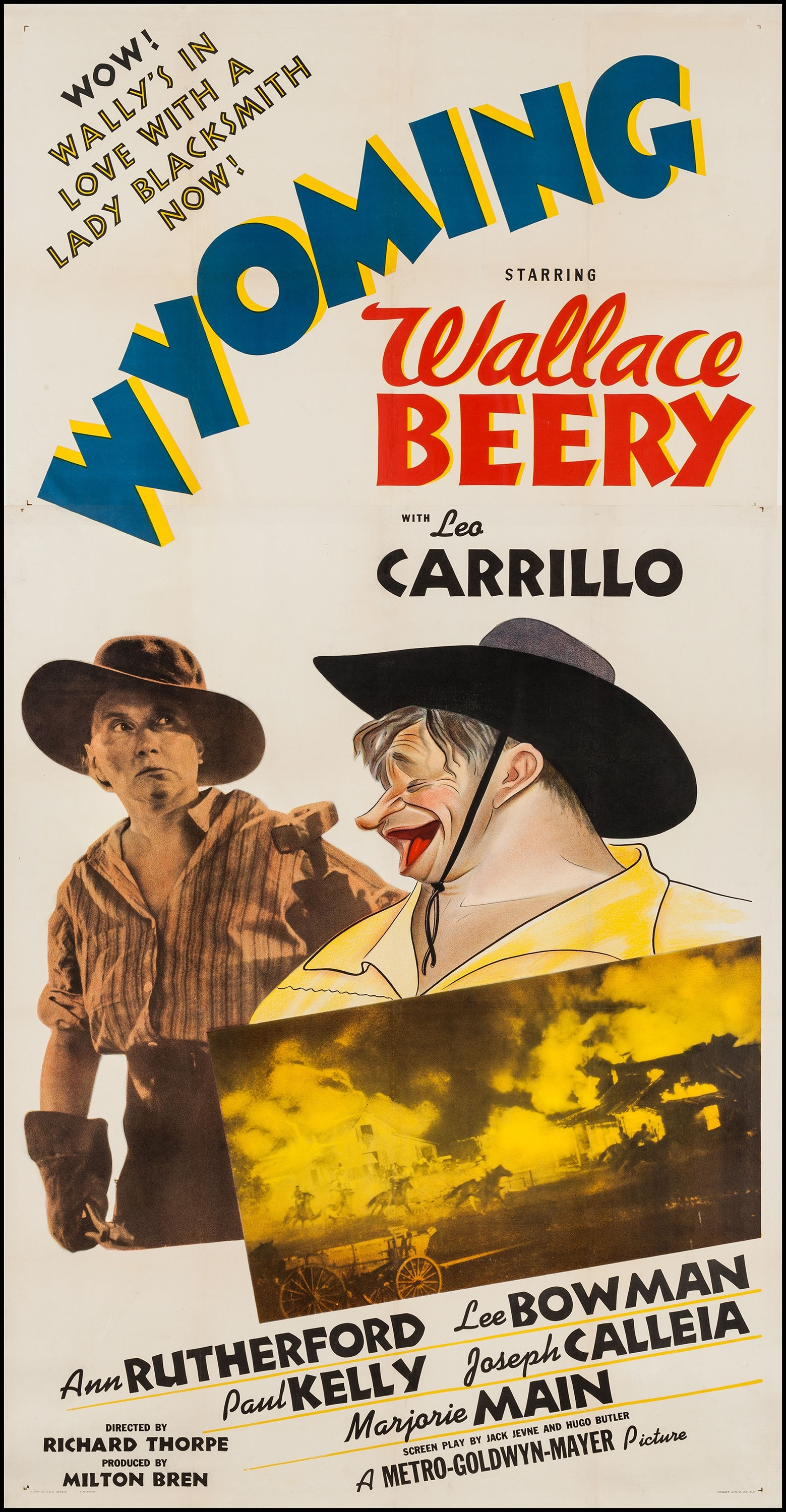
- Theatrical release poster
- Directed by: Richard Thorpe
- Screenplay by: Jack Jevne; Hugo Butler
- Story by: Jack Jevne
- Produced by: Milton H. Bren
- Starring: Wallace Beery; Leo Carrillo; Ann Rutherford; Lee Bowman; Marjorie Main
- Cinematography: Clyde De Vinna
- Edited by: Robert Kern
- Music by: David Snell
- Production company: Metro-Goldwyn-Mayer
- Distributed by: Loew's Inc.
- Release date: September 13, 1940 (U.S. theatrical)
- Running time: 87 minutes
- Country: United States
- Language: English

Wyoming is a 1940 American Western film directed by Richard Thorpe and starring Wallace Beery. Wyoming was the first of seven films pairing Beery and character actress Marjorie Main.

== Plot ==
"Reb" Harkness and Pete Marillo are two outlaws in Missouri in the period just after the American Civil War. They are robbing a train when a detachment of the US Army Cavalry arrives on the scene. Pete steals Reb's horse, leaving him to face the soldiers on foot. He manages to hide from then and then decides to move to California

While traveling west Reb meets Dave Kincaid, a former Confederate States Army soldier. Kincaid invites Reb to accompany him to his ranch in the Wyoming Territory. As they near the ranch, Kincaid is murdered by cattle rustlers who steal his money. Reb then continues to Kincaid's ranch to care for his daughter Lucy and son Jimmy. At the ranch, Reb learns that the town's corrupt mayor, John Buckley, is forcing the ranchers from their lands. However, Reb is not interested in this fight.

While in town, Reb spots one of the men who murdered Kincaid. After killing him, he finds Kincaid's money and returns it to Jimmy and Lucy. At this point, Reb plans to continue on to California. However, US Army General George Custer arrives in town with a squad of cavalry. Buckley goes to Custer, accusing Reb of killing one of his men. Custer arrest him and puts in the town jail, in the custody of a sheriff who is Buckley's tool.

Buckley wants to steal the rest of Kincaid's cattle, but he needs Custer to leave the area. He arranges a diversion in Laramie, Wyoming, to which Custer responds. Reb escapes from jail and meets with his former companion Pete.

ster arrests him and places him in the custody of the town's weak-willed sheriff, who is also Buckley's tool. Plotting to rustle the remainder of Kincaid's cattle, Buckley arranges for a diversion to compel Custer to go to Laramie. He then sets a trap for Reb, but Reb outwits him, escapes, and meets up with Pete again, who decides to help him. Upon learning that Buckley's men have killed Lafe, the brother of the town's female blacksmith, Mehitabel, Reb sides with the ranchers.

Custer unexpectedly returns and declares martial law in the area. Buckley then arranges for a group of Indian tribesmen to attack the town. When Reb finds Buckley, he shoots him to death and then joins Custer in fending off the Indian attack. Reb then decides to settle down in Wyoming and marry Mehitabel.

== Cast ==
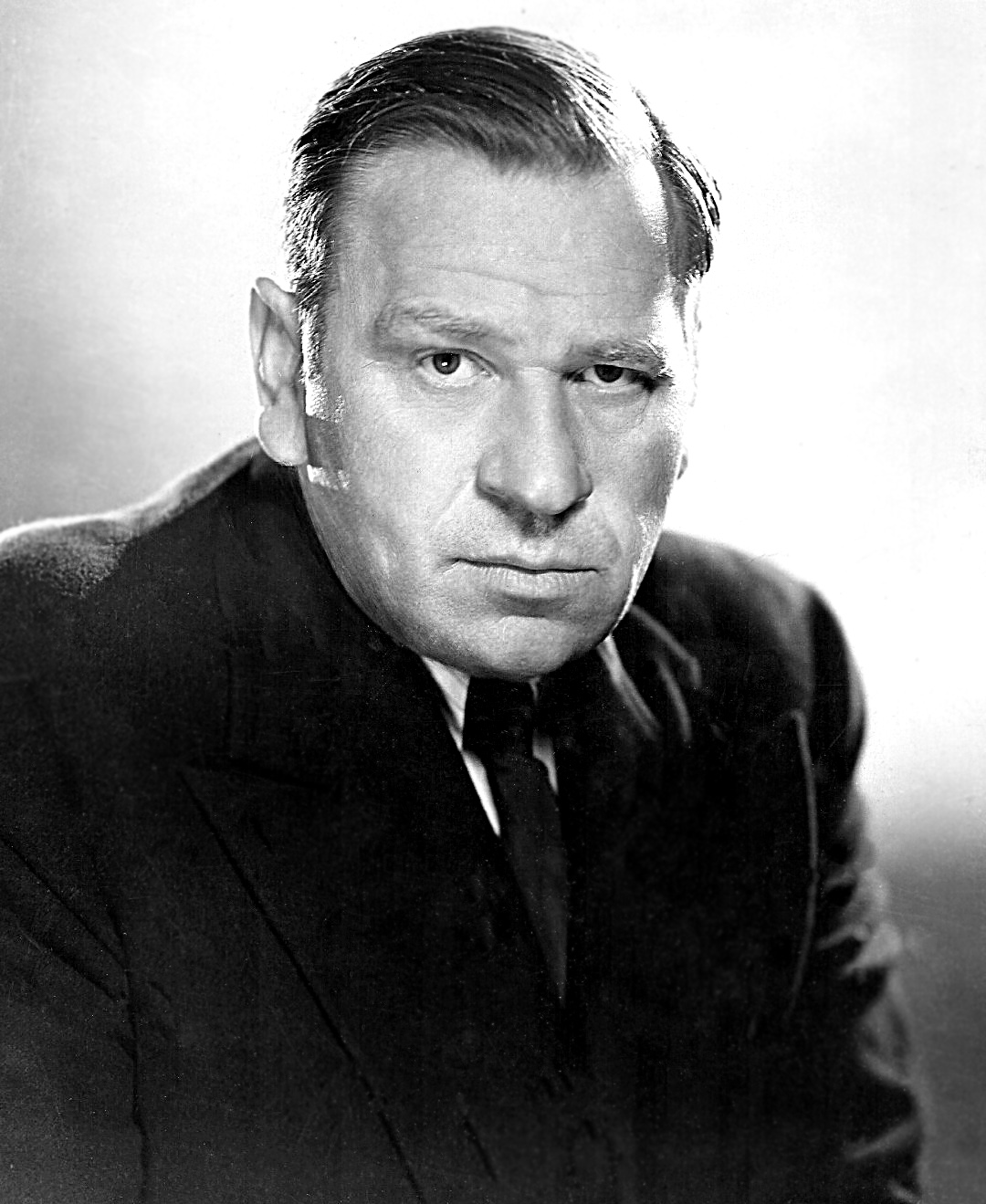
Wallace Berry as "Reb" Harkness

- Wallace Beery as "Reb" Harkness
- Leo Carrillo as Peter Marillo
- Ann Rutherford as Lucy Kincaid
- Lee Bowman as Sgt. Connelly
- Joseph Calleia as John Buckley
- Bobs Watson as Jimmy Kincaid
- Paul Kelly as General George Armstrong Custer
- Henry Travers as Sheriff
- Marjorie Main as Mehitabel
- Glenn Strange as Bill Smalley (uncredited)
- Chill Wills as Lafe (uncredited)

== Production ==
Wyoming was filmed in the State of Wyoming at the town of Jackson Hole and inside the Grand Tetons National Park.

== See also ==
The other six Wallace Beery and Marjorie Main films:

- Barnacle Bill (1941)
- Jackass Mail (1942)
- The Bugle Sounds (1942)
- Rationing (1944)
- Bad Bascomb (1946)
- Big Jack (1949)
