= Dark Command =

1940 film by Raoul Walsh

- 1940 film poster
- Directed by: Raoul Walsh
- Written by: F. Hugh Herbert; Lionel Houser; Grover Jones; Jan Isbell Fortune (adaptation)
- Based on: The Dark Command; 1938 novel by W.R. Burnett
- Produced by: Sol C. Siegel
- Starring: Claire Trevor; John Wayne; Walter Pidgeon; Roy Rogers; Gabby Hayes; Porter Hall; Marjorie Main; Raymond Walburn
- Cinematography: Jack A. Marta
- Edited by: William Morgan
- Music by: Victor Young
- Production company: Republic Pictures
- Distributed by: Republic Pictures
- Release date: April 15, 1940 (United States)
- Running time: 94 minutes
- Country: United States
- Language: English
- Budget: $750,000

Dark Command is a 1940 American Western thriller film that stars Claire Trevor and John Wayne, with Walter Pidgeon, Roy Rogers and Marjorie Main, loosely based on Quantrill's Raiders during the American Civil War. Directed by Raoul Walsh from the novel by W. R. Burnett, Dark Command is the only film in which western icons John Wayne and Roy Rogers appear together, and was the only film Wayne and Raoul Walsh made together since Walsh discovered Wayne working as a prop mover, renamed him, and gave him his first leading role in the epic widescreen Western The Big Trail a decade before.

The film also features George "Gabby" Hayes as Wayne's character's sidekick.

The film was nominated for two Academy Awards for Best Original Score and Best Art Direction by John Victor Mackay.

== Plot ==
Mary McCloud marries the seemingly peaceful Kansas schoolteacher William Cantrell, before finding out that he harbours a dark secret. He is actually an outlaw leader who attacks both sides in the Civil War for his own profit. After capturing a wagon loaded with Confederate uniforms, he decides to pass himself off as a Confederate officer. Her naive, idealistic brother Fletcher joins what he believes is a Rebel guerrilla force. Meanwhile, Cantrell's stern but loving mother refuses to accept any of her son's ill-gotten loot.

A former suitor of Mary's, Union supporter Bob Seton, is captured by Cantrell and scheduled for execution. After being rescued by a disillusioned Fletcher McCloud, Seton and Mary Cantrell race to the town of Lawrence (site of an actual infamous Quantrill-led massacre) to warn the residents of an impending attack by Cantrell's gang.

== Cast ==
- Claire Trevor as Mary McCloud
- John Wayne as Bob Seton
- Walter Pidgeon as William "Will" Cantrell
- Roy Rogers as Fletcher "Fletch" McCloud
- George "Gabby" Hayes as Andrew "Doc" Grunch
- Porter Hall as Angus McCloud
- Marjorie Main as Mrs. Cantrell, aka Mrs. Adams
- Raymond Walburn as Judge Buckner
- Joe Sawyer as Bushropp (guerrilla)
- Helen MacKellar as Mrs. Hale
- J. Farrell MacDonald as Dave (gunrunner)
- Trevor Bardette as Mr. Hale

== Production ==
W.R. Burnett's novel was published in 1938 and became a best seller. It was a rare historical novel from Burnett, who was better known for modern day crime stories. Film rights were purchased by Republic Pictures who announced the film in May 1939 as part of their slate for 1939–40.

Director Raoul Walsh had discovered John Wayne in 1929 when Wayne was a 23-year-old prop man named Marion "Duke" Morrison. Walsh was reading a biography of General "Mad Anthony" Wayne at the time and gave the prop boy the last name "Wayne" after casting him as the lead in The Big Trail (1930), a 70 mm Grandeur widescreen epic shot on location all across the West. Dark Command remains the only other film upon which both Walsh and Wayne collaborated during their lengthy careers.

The film was financed on a larger budget than Republic normally provided. It was a similar scale to a successful historical drama they had made the year before, Man of Conquest. Walter Pidgeon was borrowed from MGM. Filming started November 1939.

Dark Command was the second film John Wayne made with Claire Trevor after Stagecoach, the other being Allegheny Uprising (1939).

Roy Rogers was given a key support role in Dark Command, the only time John Wayne and Roy Rogers made a movie together.

== Historical inaccuracies ==
- The pistols used by some of the cast are Colt single action army, SAA guns, not made until 1873. The movie is set at the outbreak of the Civil War in 1860 when cap and ball pistols were used such as the Colt 1851 Navy. John Wayne carries a Colt Peacemaker not made until 1873.
- The famous frontier towns of Newton and Dodge are repeatedly mentioned; However, neither town was founded until years after the Civil War.
- Southern audiences were distanced from Cantrell's atrocities as Cantrill's force is portrayed as a false flag. Quantrill and his Raiders were in fact inducted into the Confederate Army before the Lawrence Massacre.

== Release ==
Dark Command premiered in Lawrence, Kansas.

It received favourable reviews and box office, and encouraged Republic to continue to allocate more money for John Wayne films.
