= S. Sylvan Simon =

American film director

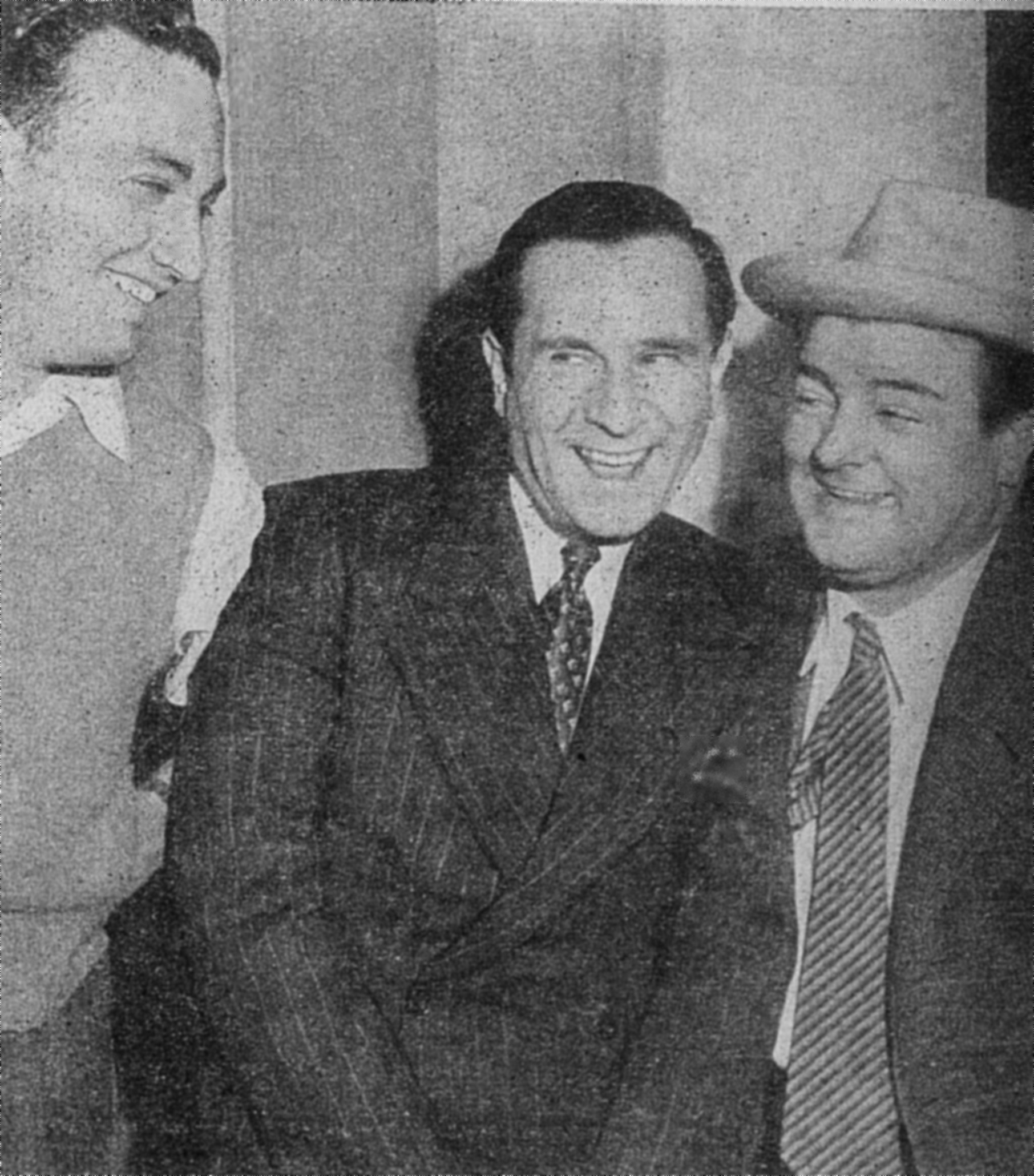
- S. Sylvan Simon (left) with Abbott and Costello during the filming of Rio Rita (1942)
- Born: March 9, 1910; Chicago, Illinois, United States
- Died: May 17, 1951 (aged 41); Hollywood, Los Angeles, California
- Education: University of Michigan
- Spouse: Harriet Berk (m. 1935)

S. Sylvan Simon (March 9, 1910 – May 17, 1951) was an American stage/film director and producer. He directed numerous Hollywood films in the late 1930s to 1940s, and was the producer of Born Yesterday (1950).

== Life and work ==
Born in Chicago, Simon earned bachelor's and master's degrees at the University of Michigan, and later attended Columbia Law School.

Simon began his film career at Warner Bros. in 1935, directing screen tests. He became so proficient that Universal Pictures assigned him to fashion several tests into a short-subject special titled Screen Test. Screen Test and a few Universal feature assignments earned him an invitation from MGM to direct. He became a comedy specialist, supervising many of the slapstick sequences in the Marx Brothers' The Big Store. He directed Red Skelton's first starring feature, 1941's Whistling in the Dark, and in 1948 worked on two more Skelton vehicles, MGM's A Southern Yankee (replacing the scheduled director Edward Sedgwick) and Columbia Pictures' The Fuller Brush Man. Simon also directed Wallace Beery in Bad Bascomb (1946), and a Glenn Ford western, Lust for Gold (1949).

Simon was the producer of Born Yesterday, a 1950 comedy that was nominated for five Academy Awards.

He died of a heart attack, in Hollywood, California, at the age of 41. His ashes were interred in a small unassuming bronze nameplate niche at Columbarium of Memory (Niche # 20174), in the Great Mausoleum at Forest Lawn Memorial Park Cemetery, Glendale, California.

== Filmography ==
=== Director ===
- Screen Test (1937 short)
- A Girl with Ideas (1937)
- Prescription for Romance (1937)
- The Crime of Doctor Hallet (1938)
- The Road to Reno (1938)
- The Nurse from Brooklyn (1938)
- Spring Madness (1938)
- Four Girls in White (1939)
- The Kid from Texas (1939)
- These Glamour Girls (1939)
- Dancing Co-Ed (1939)
- Two Girls on Broadway (1940)
- Sporting Blood aka Sterling Metal (1940)
- Dulcy (1940)
- Keeping Company (1940)
- Washington Melodrama (1941)
- Whistling in the Dark (1941)
- The Bugle Sounds (1942)
- Rio Rita (1942)
- Grand Central Murder (1942)
- Tish (1942)
- Whistling in Dixie (1942)
- Salute to the Marines (1943)
- Whistling in Brooklyn (1943)
- Song of the Open Road (1944)
- Son of Lassie (1945)
- Abbott and Costello in Hollywood (1945)
- Bad Bascomb (1946)
- The Thrill of Brazil (1946)
- The Cockeyed Miracle aka The Return of Mr. Griggs (1946)
- Her Husband's Affairs (1947)
- I Love Trouble (1948)
- The Fuller Brush Man (1948)
- Lust for Gold (1949)

=== Producer ===
- Abbott and Costello in Hollywood (uncredited, 1945)
- I Love Trouble (1948)
- The Fuller Brush Man (1948)
- Shockproof (1949)
- Lust for Gold (1949)
- Miss Grant Takes Richmond (1949)
- Father Is a Bachelor (1950)
- The Good Humor Man (1950)
- The Fuller Brush Girl (1950)
- Born Yesterday (1950)
