= Red Light (film) =

1949 film noir

- Theatrical release poster
- Directed by: Roy Del Ruth
- Screenplay by: George Callahan; Charles Grayson (additional dialogue)
- Based on: the story "This Guy Gideon" by Don "Red" Barry
- Produced by: Roy Del Ruth; Joseph Kaufman (associate producer)
- Starring: George Raft; Virginia Mayo
- Cinematography: Bert Glennon
- Edited by: Richard V. Heermance
- Music by: Dimitri Tiomkin
- Production company: Roy Del Ruth Productions (as Pioneer Pictures Corp.)
- Distributed by: United Artists
- Release date: September 30, 1949 (United States)
- Running time: 83 minutes
- Country: United States
- Language: English

Red Light is a 1949 American film noir crime film starring George Raft and Virginia Mayo, and directed and produced by Roy Del Ruth. Based on the story "This Guy Gideon" by Don "Red" Barry, it features strong religious overtones.

It was one of several thrillers Raft made in the late 1940s.

== Plot ==
Bookkeeper Nick Cherney is sent to jail for embezzling from Johnny Torno's trucking company. One week before getting out, he sees a newsreel showing Johnny welcoming home his heroic brother Jess, a Catholic chaplain just returned from a World War II prisoner-of-war camp. Nick decides to get back at Johnny and hires Rocky (a fellow-inmate about to be released) to murder Jess.

Johnny arrives soon after Rocky has shot his brother and left. Knowing that he is about to die, Jess indicates that a clue to his murder can be found in the room's Gideon Bible. However, the book is not there.

Johnny investigates on his own, creating much tension with the police. He tracks down and questions people who occupied Jess' hotel room, believing that one of them has the Bible. He hires Carla North, who once stayed in the room, and lost her brother in World War II, to help him search. He insists she live at his luxury apartment; he moves into his office.

While Johnny is questioning another hotel guest, now in Reno, he notices Rocky watching him and sets a trap. Rocky manages to escape, after Johnny wounds him.

Later Rocky attempts to blackmail Nick, who shoves him off the train. The clerk at Nick's apartment tells him that he told a man that Nick had gone to Reno. Deducing who the man was, Nick goes to Johnny's trucking company office and murders manager Warni Hazard. The death is reported as an accident.

Obsessed with revenge, Johnny asks Carla to locate the last person on his list, Pablo Cabrillo. But she is tired of Johnny's overbearing quest and tells him they need to forget about the dead. He slaps her, then tries to apologize, but she leaves. The police confront Johnny and subsequently put a 24-hour watch on him. With help from an employee, he manages to slip away.

Johnny drives to see Cabrillo, who turns out to be a veteran, blinded in the war. He admits to taking the Bible, but asks to keep it due to its significance to him. He explains that, believing he would be a burden to his family, he was about to shoot himself when the window washer stopped him. He picked up the Bible and read to him, restoring his hope. Johnny insists on taking the book and Cabrillo agrees to let him have it, but they learn that it was taken only an hour earlier by a young, beautiful woman.

Johnny angrily goes to church where, in a burst of rage, he breaks a stained-glass window that he had recently donated in thanksgiving for Jess's safe return from the war. Remorseful, he returns to his office and writes a check to replace the window; while there he receives word that Carla has checked into a hotel. Nick arrives at Johnny's office and agrees to help find Carla. She soon arrives at the office with the Bible. The police show up moments later to tell Johnny that they found his gun—one he had taken from Rocky.

Worried, Nick watches as Carla gives Johnny the book. Inside, he finds nothing about the killer's identity; instead he finds that his brother circled around Romans 12:19, and wrote a plea from him not to kill. Johnny is initially angry and disappointed, until Carla asks him to re-read what his brother wrote and consider that it was the last instruction he left him.

Nick thinks he is off the hook. Relieved, he turns to leave, only to spot Rocky in the lobby. In a shootout, Nick fatally wounds Rocky, but before Rocky dies, he tells the others that Nick paid for Jess' murder. Holding all of them at gunpoint, Nick confesses in front of the police before Johnny shoots and wounds him.

Pursued by Johnny and the police, Nick flees to the roof. Nick has a clear shot at Johnny, but he is out of bullets. Johnny aims at Nick, but remembers his brother's injunction. Nick flees up a huge neon sign for Torno's trucking company as the police close in. He accidentally steps on the sign's power supply and is electrocuted. Carla confronts Johnny, assuming he killed Nick, before the police tell her otherwise. The policeman tells Johnny that his brother "believed someone else was on the case," and that he was right.

== Cast ==
- George Raft as Johnny Torno
- Virginia Mayo as Carla North
- Gene Lockhart as Warni Hazard
- Raymond Burr as Nick Cherney
- Harry Morgan as Rocky (listed as "Henry Morgan" in credits)
- Barton MacLane as Detective Strecker
- Phillip Pine as Pablo Cabrillo
- Arthur Franz as Father (Chaplain) Jess Torno
- Arthur Shields as Father Redmond
- William Frawley as a hotel night clerk

== Production ==
The film is based on a story by writer Donald Barry called Mr Gideon. Roy Del Ruth and his associate Joe Kaufman brought the film rights in May 1946 from Barry and producer Lou Rock.

Del Ruth set up his production company at Monogram Pictures, who were trying to expand into more prestigious films. He made It Happened on Fifth Avenue for them, one of Monogram's most expensive pictures to date. He was meant to follow it with Mr Gideon but the project was delayed.

The story was retitled Red Light after a survey. Del Ruth started doing background filming in San Francisco in June 1947, followed by delay.

Monogram formed a subsidiary, Allied Artists, to distribute their more prestigious movies. Del Ruth made The Babe Ruth Story for Allied Artists, which announced it would finance Red Light. Del Ruth wanted Edward G. Robinson, William Bendix and Charles Bickford for the main roles. He thought the budget would be around $1.25 to $1.5 million. In September 1948 Joseph Kaufman, who worked for Del Ruth, said they were trying to get Robert Ryan to play the lead.

In January 1949 it was announced that Monogram and United Artists had signed a deal whereby United Artists would distribute Red Light and another movie Gun Crazy. The films would be financed by Pioneer Pictures, a new company which Monogram co-owned with Eastern investors. George Raft was announced as star. Virginia Mayo was borrowed from producer Samuel Goldwyn to play the female lead.

Raft was paid $65,000 for his role. He signed in February 1949 and filming started in March.

== Reception ==
=== Critical response ===
The Los Angeles Times said the film "generates suspense and promises to emerge as a taut, exciting melodrama" but that it was let down by its "religious reform theme".

The New York Times said the film was "in the main, a contest familiar to Raft's retinue of fans, complete with hard, laconic characters, a search for a culprit, a few fireworks and with the Word in the Good Book as its sole, extraordinary twist."

In 2004 film critic Dennis Schwartz said of the film, "Roy Del Ruth directs a routine film noir infused with themes of revenge and religion, as it veers more towards a regular crime drama except for photographic flashes that reveal the film's dark undertones. The film's classic noir shot is of the villainous Raymond Burr smoking and smiling as his frightened victim is being crushed to death while hiding under a trailer, as Burr has just kicked out the jack holding it up ... The film held my interest mainly because this was a perfect part for Raft and it was well-crafted."
