= The Bugle Sounds =

1942 film by S. Sylvan Simon

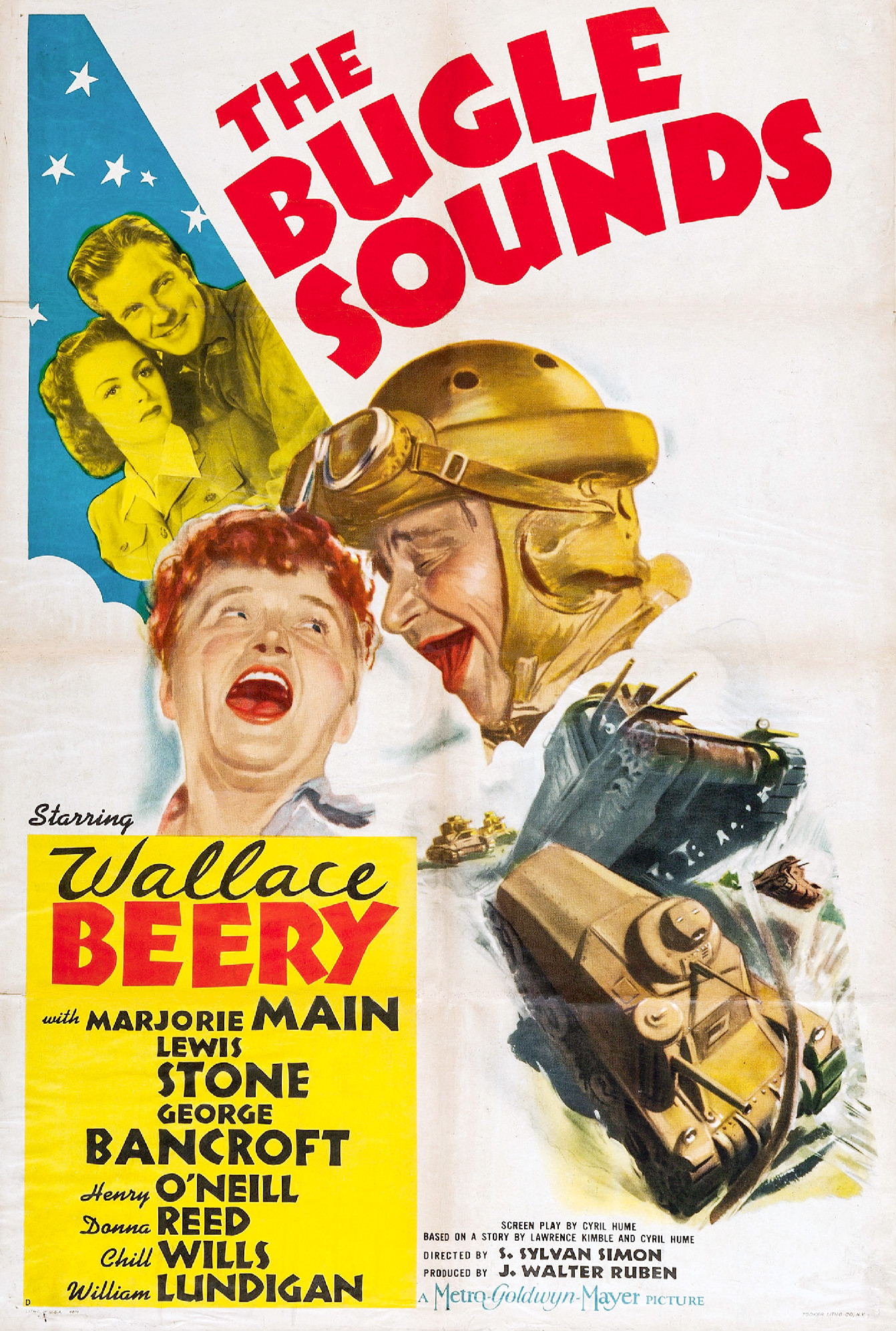
- Film poster
- Directed by: S. Sylvan Simon
- Screenplay by: Cyril Hume
- Story by: Lawrence Kimble; Cyril Hume
- Produced by: J. Walter Ruben
- Starring: Wallace Beery; Marjorie Main; Lewis Stone; George Bancroft; Henry O'Neill; Donna Reed; Chill Wills
- Cinematography: Clyde De Vinna
- Edited by: Ben Lewis
- Music by: Lennie Hayton; Daniele Amfitheatrof
- Distributed by: Metro-Goldwyn-Mayer
- Release date: January 13, 1942
- Running time: 102 minutes
- Country: United States
- Language: English
- Box office: $1.2 million (US rentals)

The Bugle Sounds is a 1942 American World War II movie starring Wallace Beery as a cavalry sergeant resistant to replacing horses with tanks. The supporting cast includes Marjorie Main, Lewis Stone, George Bancroft, Donna Reed, and Chill Wills, and the film was directed by S. Sylvan Simon.

== Plot ==
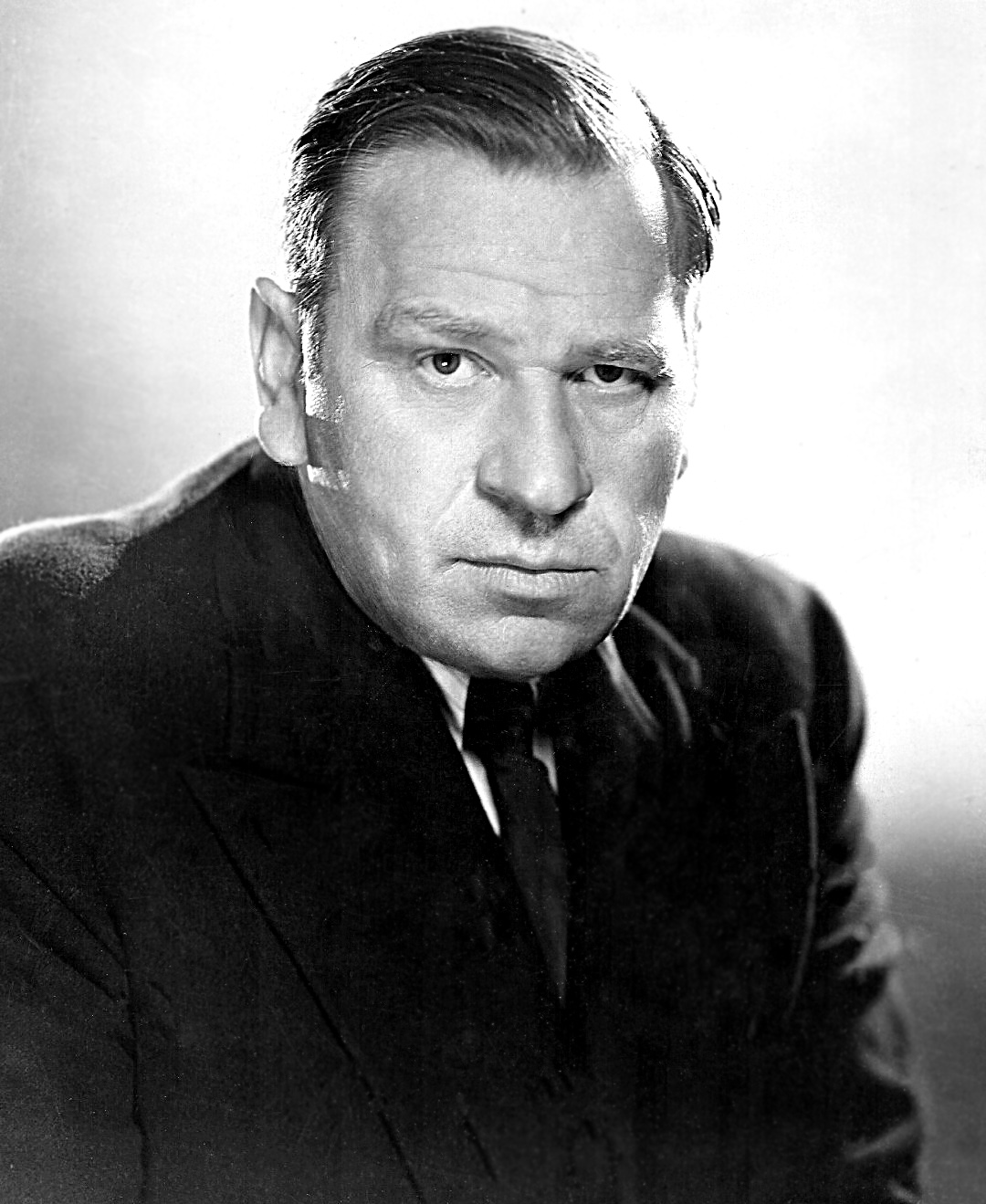
Wallace Beery as Hap

In early 1941, First Sergeant Patrick Aloysius 'Hap' Doan has been serving for many years in the US Army in the 19th Cavalry Regiment, which at that time still used horses. However, its commanding officer, Colonel Jack Lawton, has just learned that the Army is going to convert the unit from horses to tanks.

When Lawton tells Hap about the conversion, Hap says that he wants to transfer to another cavalry unit that still has horses. Lawton refuses to approve the transfer. Hap sadly visits his horse Cantigny in the stables to tell her is going to retire from the army and buy her. Having a weekend leave, Hap starts driving into town. He is irritated by being constantly delayed by tanks being brought into the base. Once in town, he starts a drinking spree at several bars.

Hap finally ends up at the home of his longtime girlfriend Susie. She owns a restaurant in the town. During their 19-year relationship, she has moved from place to place following his deployments, setting up a restaurant in each town. Hap reiterates again that he wants to marry Suzie, retire and buy a farm for her and Cantigny. Hap gets very annoyed when Russell stops by the house. He is a former cavalry man who was dishonorably discharged from the Army. He has recently become richer, claiming it came from horse promotions. Hap thinks he is lying and is jealous.

When Hap returns to the base, new recruits are arriving. He meets Joe Hanson, who recently married his girlfriend Sally and is expecting a child. While Hapt is training Joe, Sally goes into town and wanders into Susie's restaurant. After talking to Sally, Susie feels sorry for her and offers her cheap room and board. Despite his initial misgivings, Hap begins to like Joe for his work ethic and enthusiasm. At this point, Hap seems reconciled to the unit's conversion.

One day, Joe is driving one of the tanks around the base. However, it has been sabotaged. Joe loses control and the tank plows into the house stable. Cantigny is severely injured and the Army vet says that she must be euthanized. Hap sadly asks to shoot her himself. Hap blames Joe for his horse's death. Five days later, after getting a pass to town, Hap goes AWOL. Lawton refuses to charge him with desertion. Instead, he asks three of Haps' close comrades, Strong, Krims and Cartaret, to bring him back to the base.

In the meantime, a Federal Bureau of Investigation agent arrives to investigate the sabotage of the tank. Lawton tells him that they haven't found the saboteurs, but believes they are taking orders from a "Mr. Brains". The next day, Susie comes to visit Lawton and asks him not to court martial Hap. At that moment, Hap arrives in Lawton's, accompanied by his three pals, all of whom have torn clothes and black eyes. Instead of thanking Lawton for his indulgence, Hap yells at him. An angry lawton orders Hap to be sent to the stockade. He is later court-martialed and given a dishonorable discharge. However, before forwarding the papers to Washington D.C. for processing, Lawton decides not to sign them and orders Hap released from the stockade.

After his release from custody, Hap goes to Susie's house. Once there, he encounters Joe, who has come to see Sally. When Hap refuses to listen to Joe's apologies, Susie won't let him stay. She tearfully tells Hap that she is ashamed of him. When Russell hears about Hap's situation, he approaches him and says that he wants to be friends. He offers to find Hap a job. What Russell doesn't know is that Hap went to Lawton with his suspicions that Russell was complicit with the saboteurs. Lawton told Hap to pretend to work with them.

Three weeks later, Russell takes Hap to the office of a Mr. Leech. Hap agrees to help Leech and his gang stop a shipment of tanks from reaching the East Coast. Late that night, Hap sneaks into camp and tells Lawton that he has made contact with the spy ring. Lawton asks Hap to stay with them until he finds their leader. He then gives Hap specific information to pass on to the gang.

Later on, Hap, Russell and Leech drive to a barn in the countryside near a railroad trestle. Leech's men are setting explosive charges to destroy the bridge when the train carrying the tanks passes over it. Hap doesn't have time to get to a phone and call Lawton, so he has to take action. As Hap is drawing his gun, Nichols, the leader of the gang, shows up. The gang overpowers Hap and knocks him unconscious. As the train approaches, Hap regains consciousness and gets his gun. A shootout ensues between Hap and the saboteurs. The man handling the explosives detonates them prematurely, blowing up the bridge before the train arrives, giving it time to stop. The soldiers on the train, including Joe, hear shooting and rush to the barn. They find a wounded Hap, who salutes them before passing out.

At a regimental assembly some time later, Lawton pins a medal on Hap. At that point, Hap tells Lawton that he has always thought that tanks were very practical.

== Cast ==
Marjorie Main as Susie

- Wallace Beery as First Sergeant Patrick Aloysius 'Hap' Doan
- Marjorie Main as Susie
- Lewis Stone as Colonel Jack Lawton
- George Bancroft as Russell
- Henry O'Neill as Lieutenant Colonel Harry Seton
- Donna Reed as Sally Hanson
- Chill Wills as Sergeant Larry Dillon
- William Lundigan as Private Joey Hanson
- Guinn "Big Boy" Williams as Sgt. Krims
- Tom Dugan as Sergeant Strong
- Ernest Whitman as Cartaret
- Roman Bohnen as Mr. Leech
- Jerome Cowan as Mr. Nichols
- Arthur Space as Hank
- Jonathan Hale as Brigadier-General

== See also ==
- List of American films of 1942

The other six Wallace Beery and Marjorie Main films:

- Wyoming (1940)
- Barnacle Bill (1941)
- Jackass Mail (1942)
- Rationing (1944)
- Bad Bascomb (1946)
- Big Jack (1949)
