= Barnacle Bill (1941 film) =

1941 feature film directed by Richard Thorpe

- Directed by: Richard Thorpe
- Screenplay by: Jack Jevne; Hugo Butler
- Story by: Jack Jevne
- Produced by: Milton H. Bren
- Starring: Wallace Beery; Marjorie Main
- Cinematography: Clyde De Vinna
- Edited by: Frank Hull
- Music by: Bronisław Kaper; Lennie Hayton
- Production company: Metro-Goldwyn-Mayer
- Distributed by: Loew's Inc.
- Release date: April 7, 1941
- Running time: 90 minutes
- Country: United States
- Language: English

Barnacle Bill is a 1941 American comedy drama film starring Wallace Beery. The screen comedy was directed by Richard Thorpe. Barnacle Bill was the second of seven MGM films pairing Beery and character actress Marjorie Main.

== Plot ==
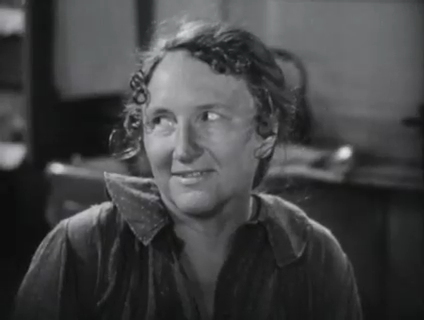
Marjorie Main as Marge Cavendish

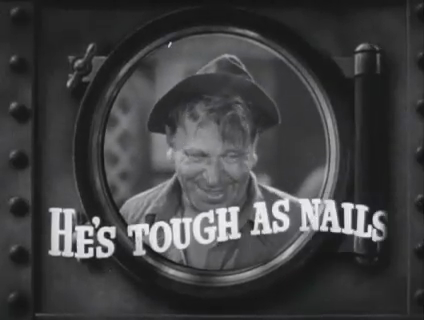
Wallace Beery as Barnacle Bill

Bill Johansen is an unambitious fisherman working out of San Pedro, California. He has a 12-year-old daughter Virginia, whom he has not seen since she was a baby. Bill has a small, decrepit fishing boat and a large amount of debt. His partner on the boat is named Pico. Bill owes a large amount of money to Pop Cavendish, a ship chandler. Pop's older daughter Marge wants to marry Bill. Pop has tried to issue a lien on Bill's boat to get the money owed, but Bill had listed Virginia as its owner, thwarting Pop. The fishing industry in San Pedro is monopolized John Kelly, the fish processor; he forces the local fishermen into selling their catch to him for less than their than market value. Marge tells Bill he should stand up to Kelly. However, Bill is not interested. He would rather fish for swordfish, which bring a higher price. He can work less and still earn enough money to buy beer for him and Pico.

One day, Virginia's Aunt Letty brings her over to meet her father Bill for the first time. Virginia then says she wants to live with him. Letty thinks Bill is an unfit father. Bill likes Virginia, but doesn't want the responsibility of raising a child, so he convinces Marge to let Virginia live ashore with her. Virginia and Marge decide to try to reform Bill. Bill attends church with them, but later shows up drunk for supper. Virginia tells Bill about the death of "Gramps", her maternal grandfather, who was a fishing schooner captain in Gloucester, Massachusetts. Bill tells her his dream is to captain the We're Here, a schooner docked in San Pedro, and Virginia gives him Gramps' captain's telescope as a symbol of the dream.

To make Bill's dream come true, Bill and Pico take jobs on a tuna boat. After returning from a month-long fishing trip at sea, Bill discovers that find that Virginia and Marge have rehabilitated his boat. When Bill collects his pay from Kelly for his fish, he receives much less than expected. He suspects that Kelly is cheating the fishermen by under-weighing their catches. Bill confronts one of Kelly's henchmen and demands a bribe to stay quiet. The man agrees and Bill is about to accept the money. However, he sees Virginia bringing over the other cheated fishermen to watch him stand up to Kelly's gang. To save face, Bill refuses the bribe and throws the henchman into the harbor. Virginia takes Bill's wages for safekeeping, but he gets drunk anyway to celebrate his new status as a hero. After Bill passes out, Kelly scuttles his boat in reprisal for his defiance.

As Bill and Pico work to raise their boat, Virginia is horrified to see that the We're here is being sold at auction. Bill goes to the auction and imprudently offers the highest bid. He uses his fishing money for a deposit; the auction house gives him ten days to pay the balance. Bill wants to sail the We're Here to the South Sea Islands with Marge. He charms Marge into giving him the money to pay the balance on the boat, hinting that they might get married.

In contrast, the other San Pedro fishermen want Bill to convert the We're Here into a reefer ship that would compete with Kelly for the fish processing business; they offer to finance the conversion. Bill pretends to accept their offer, but then goes to visit Kelly. If Kelly pays him off, Bill will not convert the We're Here . Bill actually wants to use the money to buy goods for trade to natives in the South Seas. Kelly gives him the money. Virginia soon uncover Bill's scheme with Kelly. Disillusioned, she asks Letty to take her home. When Marge comes to retrieve Virginia's clothes, Bill returns Gramps' telescope.

A conscience-stricken Bill decides to keep his promise to the fishermen. Bill and Pop take the We're Here out fishing; Marge stows away as cook to keep Bill honest. When Bill arrives at the fishing grounds, Kelly is again trying to intimidate the fishermen. Bill boards Kelly's boat and returns the bribe. That night, Kelly and his gang sneak aboard the fish-laden We're Here to scuttle her. However, they are discovered and Bill's crew subdues them. A violent storm descends on the boat and Bill puts everyone to work to weather. Virginia and the telescope are waiting back at San Pedro when the We're Here returns. Bill and a suddenly bashful Marge soon wed.

== Cast ==
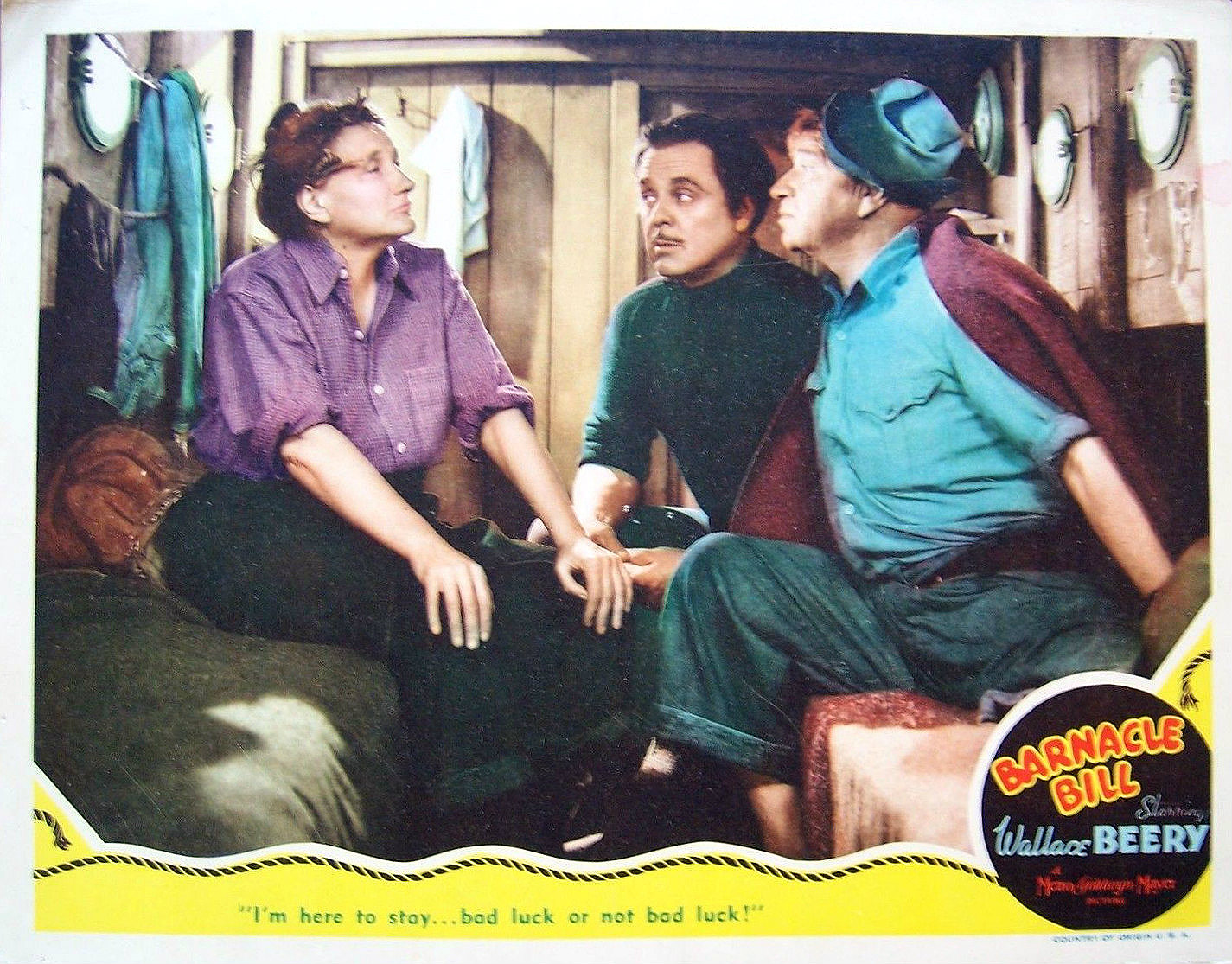
Marjorie Main, Wallace Beery and Leo Carrillo

- Wallace Beery as Bill Johansen
- Marjorie Main as Marge Cavendish
- Leo Carrillo as Pico Rodriguez
- Virginia Weidler as Virginia Johansen
- Donald Meek as Pop Cavendish
- Barton MacLane as John Kelly
- Connie Gilchrist as Mamie
- Sara Haden as Aunt Letty
- William Edmunds as Joe Petillo
- Don Terry as Dixon
- Alec Craig as MacDonald
- Charles Lane as Auctioneer (uncredited)

== See also ==
The other six Wallace Beery and Marjorie Main films:

- Wyoming (1940)
- Jackass Mail (1942)
- The Bugle Sounds (1942)
- Rationing (1944)
- Bad Bascomb (1946)
- Big Jack (1949)
