= Long John Silver (film) =

1954 pirate adventure film

- Original film poster
- Directed by: Byron Haskin
- Written by: Martin Rackin
- Produced by: Joseph Kaufman
- Starring: Robert Newton; Kit Taylor; Connie Gilchrist; Lloyd Berrell; Grant Taylor
- Cinematography: Carl Guthrie A.S.C.
- Edited by: Manuel delCampo
- Music by: David Buttolph
- Production company: Treasure Island Pictures
- Distributed by: Distributors Corporation of America
- Release dates: 16 December 1954 (Australia); 17 December 1954 (UK); 21 December 1954 (U.S.)
- Running time: 106 minutes
- Countries: United States; Australia
- Budget: US$1,000,000
- Box office: 754,745 admissions (France)

Long John Silver, also known as Long John Silver's Return to Treasure Island, is a 1954 American-Australian adventure film about the eponymous pirate Long John Silver, with Robert Newton repeating his starring role from Walt Disney's 1950 feature Treasure Island. It is a sequel to the original novel by Robert Louis Stevenson. Newton's billing in the opening credits states, "Robert Newton as Robert Louis Stevenson's immortal", followed by the title Long John Silver, presenting Robert Louis Stevenson's immortal Long John Silver as another of the film's alternate titles.

Kit Taylor plays Jim Hawkins, Connie Gilchrist is Purity Pinker, Lloyd Berrell is Capt. Mendoza, Kit Taylor's father Grant Taylor plays Patch and 24-year-old Rod Taylor, credited under his early stage name, Rodney Taylor, has the showy role of the blind bearded pirate Israel Hands who murderously pursues Jim.

The film was shot in CinemaScope and color at Sydney's Pagewood Studios and the same company went on to make The Adventures of Long John Silver, a 26-episode TV series with the same actors. The director, Byron Haskin, also directed the 1950 Disney film and at least one episode of the TV series.

Long John Silver's Return to Treasure Island should not be confused with another 1954 American film, Return to Treasure Island, released six months earlier, in June, with stars Tab Hunter and Dawn Addams.

== Plot ==
The movie is set some time after the events of Treasure Island. Long John Silver and crew are broke and bumming around Portobello (a fictional port in the British West Indies). Long John has a map to a second treasure cache on Treasure Island; but needs a special medallion to decode it. The pirate Mendoza has kidnapped Governor Strong's daughter Elizabeth and is holding her ransom. Also captured is Jim Hawkins, who has been press ganged into serving as cabin boy. Hawkins has secretly helped Dod Perch escape, and sent them to track down Long John Silver for help. Perch manages to find Long John, but is beaten to the punch and killed by two of Mendoza's men. Perch is able to mention Mendoza, Strong and Hawkins before perishing. Long John visits Governor Strong and his wife and proposes to deliver the ransom before they pursue Mendoza.

During the pickup of the ransom, Long John goes with Billy Bowlegs to Mendoza's ship and blackmails Mendoza over their plan to hoard the ransom money. Long John suggests to Mendoza that he leave Elizabeth on shore and lure the governor's warships away in order to sack the king's warehouses. As Mendoza carries out the plan, Long John finds that Jim possesses the pirate medallion indicating the second treasure's location. Mendoza begins to double cross Long John, but Long John has his men ambush and capture Mendoza along with the warehouse fortune, while Jim and Elizabeth make their escape.

Back at the governor's house, Jim is offered the chance to go back to England, but Long John has plans to take Jim with him on the second voyage to Treasure Island. After his crew has been captured along with the warehouse loot, Long John seizes an opportunity to crew Captain MacDougall's ship, the same slave ship carrying Hawkins back to Bristol. Long John sets off, avoiding becoming engaged to Purity Pinker, and barely escaping the alert local sentries.

Long John plots a mutiny on Captain MacDougall's ship. Hawkins discovers Long John's plan and tells the puritanical MacDougall, who decides to maroon Long John and his men on an island that is the secret hideout of Mendoza. Jim sets fire to Mendoza's warehouse so that Long John and his crew can capture Mendoza's ship. As Long John sails for Treasure Island, Mendoza awaits his next ship.

Once on Treasure Island, Long John and his men take shelter in the stockade from Israel Hands, who had survived Jim's shot some time ago, but is blind. Israel keeps Long John and his men trapped, killing them a few at a time. Soon, Mendoza's men arrive, and Israel offers to side with Long John in return for a passage to Cornwall and vengeance against Jim. After they flee, Mendoza burns down the stockade.

Long John follows the trail of the map to the caves where the treasure is buried. Israel tries to kill Jim, but Jim leads him to the coast, where Israel plunges to his death. As Jim heads back to the caves, he is taken by Mendoza, who is going to use him as bait to get Long John, but Long John surrenders to Mendoza, giving his men the opportunity to make an attack, cutting down Mendoza's forces and leaving the rest marooned. Long John returns to Portobello as a rich citizen and dines with the Governor, during which it is implied that Silver received a pardon for his past crimes for the role he played in saving his daughter's life, and for a "generous donation to Government House" that served to "arm the harbor against pirates". He and Jim ride off before Purity Pinker can pull a shotgun wedding.

== Cast ==
- Robert Newton as Long John Silver
- Connie Gilchrist as Purity Pinker
- Lloyd Berrell as Capt. Mendoza, 'El Toro'
- Grant Taylor as Patch
- Rodney Taylor as Israel Hands
- Harvey Adams as Governor Sir Henry Strong
- Muriel Steinbeck as Lady Strong
- Henry Gilbert as Billy Bowlegs
- John Brunskill as Old Stringley
- Eric Reiman as Lanky pirate Trip Fenner
- Harry Hambleton as Big Eric
- Syd Chambers as Ned Shill
- George Simpson Little as Capt. Asa MacDougal
- Tony Arpino as Mendoza pirate
- Al Thomas as Mendoza pirate
- Vladislaus Leonaitis
- Thora Smith as Elizabeth Strong
- Billy Kay as Ironhand
- Hans Stern as Father Monaster
- Owen Weingott
- Don McNiven as Sergeant Cover
- Elwyn Daniel as Dodd Perch the dying pirate
- Charles McCallum as Elderly naval officer
- John Pooley as Young naval officer
- Frants Folmer as Sentry
- Fred Goddard
- Kevin Healy
- Jeffrey Bradley
- Nicki Martino as Barmaid
- Kenneth Warren
- John Llewellyn
- James Workman
- and introducing Kit Taylor as Jim Hawkins

Uncredited

- Harry Willis as singer

== Production ==
Walt Disney's film of Treasure Island (1950), starring Robert Newton as Long John Silver, had been very successful at the box office. Because the novel was in the public domain, producer Joseph Kaufman decided to make a sequel in which Newton reprised his role.

The film was produced by Treasure Island Pictures Pty. Ltd. The company's dominant shareholder and financier was Joseph Kaufman. The minor shareholders were director Byron Haskin, writer Martin Rackin and star Robert Newton.

The producer chose Australia to film, rather than Egypt, as a number of other films had been successfully made in Australia to reduce production costs, which was a common practice in the 1950s for US and British films, as the Australian crews spoke English. Part of the funding from the film came from notorious Wall Street financier Louis Wolfson. Byron Haskin alleged that producer Joseph Kaufman ran out of money during production, making shooting extremely difficult. Haskin arrived in February 1954.

Byron Haskin had experience working with Australians on His Majesty O'Keefe (1953) and cast several actors from that film, including Grant Taylor, Muriel Steinbeck, and Guy Doleman. Doleman was selected to play Israel Hands but refused to grow a beard and wear contact lenses which were required for the part. He dropped out and Rod Taylor stepped in instead. The only actors imported were Robert Newton and Connie Gilchrist. The role of Jim Hawkins was given to Grant Taylor's son Kit.

The film was shot in and around Sydney during 1954. Most of the filming was done at Pagewood Studios, where large sets were built representing a pirate ship, seaport and waterfront street. The filmmakers also constructed a galleon on a barge at Botany Bay, and filmed a sea battle between six foot model ships in Port Hacking. Other locations used included the Jenolan Caves (standing in for the caves on Treasure Island), Garie Beach, south of National Park (as the coast of Portobello) and the town of Waterfall (substituting for Treasure Island).

Production began on 3 May 1954 and shooting lasted for 63 working days. Filming was complicated by the fact that it was the first movie in Australia shot in CinemaScope. This was also the first movie to be shot in DeLuxe Color outside the United States. Del Campo became the second Mexican, after Joe MacDonald, to work on a CinemaScope picture.

While making the film, court proceedings were initiated against Newton in England to fulfill his debts, which resulted in his being declared bankrupt.

== Reception ==
Critical reaction to the film was generally poor. A color television series, The Adventures of Long John Silver, resulted nonetheless; it ran for one series of 26 episodes. This was the first TV series made in Australia, two years before television broadcasting started in the country. The series began production in 1954 and originally aired in the US, UK, and Australia in 1955–56, 1957–58, and 1958–59, respectively.

Kylie Tennant wrote a novelisation of the script.

Kaufman took out an option on Pagewood Studios for two more years and announced plans to make other films in Australia including Come Away, Pearler, from the novel by Colin Simpson. That did not happen.

The film and its star Robert Newton were referenced several times in the UK TV comedy series Hancock's Half Hour (1956–1961).
