= Joseph Kaufman (producer) =

American film producer

Joseph Kaufman (sometimes given as Kaufmann) (1911–1961) was an American film producer. He began his career at Monogram Pictures, then working for Roy Del Ruth before moving into independent production.

== Biography ==
Kaufman attended the University of Chicago and worked in film as a salesman and broker. He became head buyer for the Balaban and Katz theatre chain in Chicago. In 1944 he joined Monogram Pictures as a producer.

Kaufman formed his own production company in 1949 and had a bit-hit with Sudden Fear.

In 1953, Kaufman made a film and TV series in Australia about Long John Silver, giving an early role to Rod Taylor—whom Kaufman put under contract reportedly to make Come Away Pearler and Captain Henry Morgan—neither of which were ever made.

In 1957 Kaufman bought the rights to more than 300 Grand Guignol plays.

In 1958, Kaufman made Another Time Another Place with Lana Turner in England.

Kaufman died of a heart attack in 1961 and was survived by his widow Doris—whom he married in 1949—and his sister.

== Filmography ==
- Sensation Hunters (1945)
- The Shadow Returns (1946)
- Behind the Mask (1946)
- The Missing Lady (1946)
- It Happened on Fifth Avenue (1947)
- The Babe Ruth Story (1948)
- Red Light (1949)
- Lucky Nick Cain (1951)
- Pandora and the Flying Dutchman (1951)
- Sudden Fear (1952)
- Long John Silver (1954)
- The Adventures of Long John Silver (1955–56) (TV series)
- Another Time, Another Place (1958)
- Black Tights (1961)
