= Marjorie Main =

American actress (1890–1975)

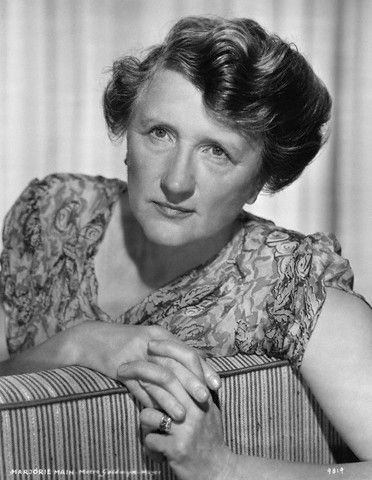
- Main in 1940
- Born: Mary Tomlinson; February 24, 1890; Acton, Indiana, U.S.
- Died: April 10, 1975 (aged 85); Los Angeles, California, U.S.
- Resting place: Forest Lawn Memorial Park, Hollywood Hills, California
- Occupation: Actress
- Years active: 1916–1959
- Spouse: Stanley LeFevre Krebs (m. 1921; died 1935)

Mary Tomlinson (February 24, 1890 – April 10, 1975), professionally known as Marjorie Main, was an American character actress and singer of the Classical Hollywood period, notable as a Metro-Goldwyn-Mayer contract player in the 1940s and 1950s, and for her role as Ma Kettle in 10 Ma and Pa Kettle movies. Main started her career in vaudeville and theatre, and appeared in film classics, such as Dead End (1937), The Women (1939), Dark Command (1940), The Shepherd of the Hills (1941), Meet Me in St. Louis (1944), and Friendly Persuasion (1956). Main, known for playing "raucous, rough, and cantankerous women" on-screen, was characterized as "soft-spoken, shy," and "dignified" off-screen.

== Early life ==
Mary Tomlinson was born on February 24, 1890, near Acton, in rural Marion County, Indiana. She was the second daughter of Reverend Samuel J. Tomlinson, a Disciples of Christ minister, and Jennie L. (McGaughey) Tomlinson. Mary's maternal grandfather, Doctor Samuel McGaughey, was the Acton physician who delivered her.

At the age of three, Tomlinson moved with her family to Indianapolis, Indiana, where her father was pastor of Hillside Christian Church. Four years later, they moved to Goshen and then Elkhart, Indiana. In the early 1900s, the Tomlinson family settled on a farm near Fairland, Indiana.

After attending public schools in Fairland and Shelbyville, Tomlinson spent a year (1905–06) at Franklin College in Franklin, Indiana, where she was a charter member of what became the present-day Delta Delta Delta sorority, before transferring to the Hamilton School of Dramatic Expression in Lexington, Kentucky. She completed a three-year course of study in 1909 at the age of 19. After graduation, Tomlinson took a job as a dramatics instructor at Bourbon College in Paris, Kentucky, but stayed only a year. Tomlinson later claimed that she was fired from the position after asking for a salary increase.

After Tomlinson left Kentucky, she spent the next several years studying dramatic arts in Chicago and New York City, despite her father's disapproval of her career choice. Tomlinson adopted the stage name of Marjorie Main during her early acting career to avoid embarrassing her family.

== Marriage ==
Main married widower Stanley LeFevre Krebs, a psychologist and lecturer, on November 2, 1921. They met while she was performing on the Chautauqua circuit. Main accompanied Krebs on the lecture circuit, handling the details of their life on the road. They had no children together, and made their home in New York City.

Main performed with touring companies and in New York theaters on a part-time basis throughout her marriage. She also began her Hollywood film career in 1931. Main considered this period "the happiest years of her life." She returned to a full-time acting career after Krebs died of cancer on September 26, 1935. Main claimed to be "brokenhearted" following her husband's death, but explained that losing him was "like losing a good friend. Like part of the family."

By Main's accounts, the couple were happy but not particularly close. Michelle Vogel, Main's biographer, quotes the actress in a later interview: "Dr. Krebs wasn't a very practical man. I didn't figure on having to run the show, I kinda tired of it after a few years. We pretty much went our own ways, but we was [sic] still in the eyes of the law, man and wife."

Vogel also revealed that Main had a long-term relationship with actress Spring Byington.

== Career ==
=== Early years ===
Main began her professional career as a performer touring in Chautauqua presentations with a Shakespearean repertory company. After performing for five months in a stock company in Fargo, North Dakota, she began working in vaudeville.

=== Stage actress ===
In the mid-1910s, Main appeared in several plays, which included touring in Cheating Cheaters with John Barrymore in 1916. She also debuted in the Broadway theatre in Yes or No in 1918. In addition, Main returned to vaudeville to perform at the Palace Theater in a skit called "The Family Ford" with comedian W. C. Fields. Not all of the early plays in which she appeared were a success. A House Divided closed in 1923 after just one performance, but Main continued to find work on the Broadway stage. In 1927, she played Mae West's mother in The Wicked Age, and in 1928, played opposite Barbara Stanwyck in the long-running stage hit Burlesque. Main also appeared in several other Broadway productions: Salvation in 1928, Scarlet Sister Mary in 1930, Ebb Tide in 1931, Music in the Air in 1932, and Jackson White.

One of Main's highest-profile stage performances was in 1935's Dead End as Mrs. Martin, the mother of gangster Baby Face Martin. She played the role in 460 performances before leaving the show in 1936 to play Lucy, a hotelkeeper/dude-ranch operator, in The Women. Main recreated these two roles in film versions of the plays in 1937 and 1939, respectively.

=== Film career ===
One of Main's first feature-film appearances was as an extra in A House Divided (1931). She also appeared in Take A Chance (1933) and Crime Without Passion (1934), and recreated her stage role as a servant in the film version of Music in the Air (also 1934), but most of her performance was cut from the film. Main also made a few more films in Hollywood in the 1930s before returning to the stage in New York City.

Samuel Goldwyn signed Main to reprise her stage role as a gangster's mother for the film version of Dead End (1937), in which Humphrey Bogart played her son. She transferred another strong stage performance to film as the dude-ranch operator in The Women (1939).

Main portrayed a diverse set of characters in subsequent films for different studios. These included roles as a mother, prison matron, landlady, aunt, secretary, and rental agent, among others.

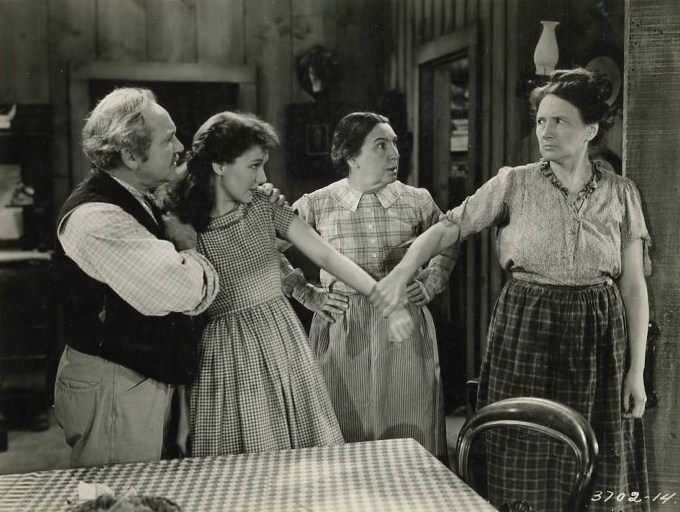
George Cleveland, Jean Parker, Sarah Padden, and Marjorie Main in Romance of the Limberlost (1938)

In 1940, Main was signed to a seven-year Metro-Goldwyn-Mayer (MGM) contract after starring with Wallace Beery in Wyoming (1940). She also co-starred in Dark Command (1940) with Walter Pidgeon, and appeared in six major films in 1941.

During World War II, Main used her stage and film notoriety to help promote the sale of war bonds for the U.S. War Department. In December 1942, she returned for a visit to central Indiana, where she helped in the sale of more than $500,000 in war bonds.

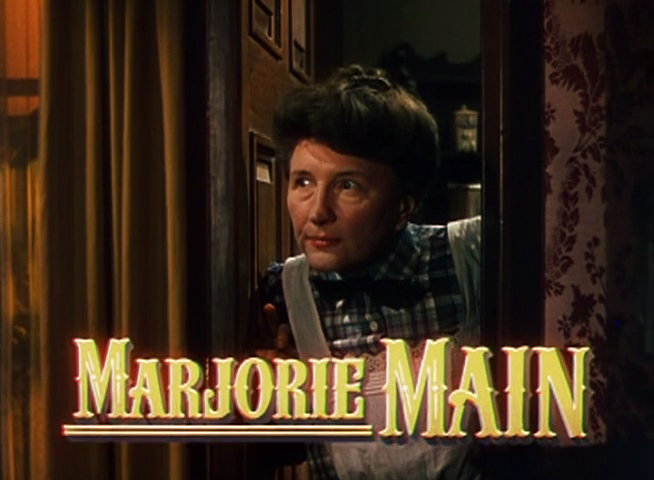
Marjorie Main in the trailer for Meet Me in St. Louis (1944)

In an attempt to repeat the success Wallace Beery had in teaming with Marie Dressler in the early 1930s, MGM cast Main opposite Beery in six more films in the mid-1940s, including Barnacle Bill (1941), Jackass Mail (1942), and Bad Bascomb (1946). Main also played chief cook Sonora Cassidy in The Harvey Girls (1946).

Ma and Pa Kettle on Vacation (1953)

Main's most notable role was Ma Kettle in the Ma and Pa Kettle film series. She had renewed her contract with MGM for another seven years, which continued until the mid-1950s, when the studio lent her to Universal Pictures to play Ma Kettle for the first time in The Egg and I (1947), starring Claudette Colbert and Fred MacMurray. Main played opposite Percy Kilbride as Pa Kettle and was nominated for an Academy Award for Best Actress in a Supporting Role for her performance in the film.

The two Kettle characters proved to be so popular with film audiences that Universal decided to do a series. Main portrayed Ma Kettle in nine films between 1949 and 1957. Kilbride was her co-star in most of the films, but left after the seventh film, Ma and Pa Kettle at Waikiki (1955). Main filmed The Kettles in the Ozarks (1956) without Kilbride. Parker Fennelly played Pa Kettle in the final film, The Kettles on Old MacDonald's Farm (1957). Each film grossed Universal about $3 million, which helped save the studio from a financial collapse. In addition to acting, Main wrote some of her dialogue and created her own costumes and makeup.

During this time, Main shuttled between Universal Studios and MGM. She appeared in several MGM musicals during the 1940s and early 1950s, including Meet Me in St. Louis (1944) and The Belle of New York (1952). She played Mrs. Wrenley in the studio's all-star film It's a Big Country (1951). Main played her last roles for MGM as Mrs. Hittaway in The Long, Long Trailer (1954) and as Jane Dunstock in Rose Marie (1954). She portrayed the widow Hudspeth in the hit film Friendly Persuasion (1956). Main's final film appearance was as Ma Kettle in The Kettles on Old MacDonald's Farm (1957).

=== Radio and television appearances ===
On December 15, 1941, she was part of the cast of Norman Corwin's radio program We Hold These Truths. She also performed in The Goldbergs.

In 1958, Main appeared as a rugged frontierswoman Cassie Tanner in the episodes "The Cassie Tanner Story" and season one, episode 39 "The Sacramento Story" of the television series Wagon Train.

== Later years and death ==
After her retirement from acting, Main lived a quiet, secluded life in Los Angeles. She became interested in spiritualism and the Moral Re-Armament movement.

Main died of lung cancer at age 85 on April 10, 1975, at St. Vincent's Hospital in Los Angeles, where she had been admitted a week earlier. Main is buried in Forest Lawn Memorial Park in Hollywood Hills, California, beside her husband, Doctor Stanley Krebs.

== Theatre performances ==
Year	Play	Character	Notes
1916	Cheating Cheaters		A touring show
1918	Yes or No		
1923	A House Divided		Closed after one show
1927	The Wicked Age		
1928	Salvation		
1928	Burlesque		
1930	Scarlet Sister Mary		
1931	Ebb Tide		
1932	Music in the Air		
1935	Jackson White		
1935	Dead End		
1936	The Women		

== Filmography ==
=== Film ===
Year	Title	Role	Notes
1929	Harry Fox and His Six American Beauties	Statler Hotel Beauty	Short, Uncredited
1931	A House Divided	Woman at wedding	Uncredited
1932	Broken Lullaby	Frau Schmidt	Uncredited
1932	Hot Saturday	Gossip in Window	Uncredited
1933	New Deal Rhythm	Delegate from Arizona	Short, Uncredited
1933	Close Relations	Woman in Depot	Short, Uncredited
1934	Art Trouble	Woman Who Sits on Painting	Short, Uncredited
1934	Crime Without Passion	Backstage Wardrobe Woman	Uncredited
1934	Music in the Air	Anna	
1935	Naughty Marietta	Casquette Girl	Uncredited
1937	Love in a Bungalow	Miss Emma Bisbee	
1937	Stella Dallas	Mrs. Martin	
1937	Dead End	Mrs. Martin	
1937	The Man Who Cried Wolf	Amelia Bradley	
1937	The Wrong Road	Martha Foster	
1937	Boy of the Streets	Mrs. Mary Brennan	
1937	The Shadow	Hannah Gillespie	
1938	City Girl	Mrs. Ward	Uncredited
1938	Penitentiary	Katie Matthews	Uncredited
1938	King of the Newsboys	Mrs. Stephens	Uncredited
1938	Test Pilot	Landlady	
1938	Three Comrades	Old Woman by Phone	Uncredited
1938	Romance of the Limberlost	Nora	
1938	Prison Farm	Matron Brand	
1938	Little Tough Guy	Mrs. Boylan	
1938	Under the Big Top	Sara Post	
1938	Too Hot to Handle	Miss Kitty Wayne	Alternative title: Let 'Em All Talk
1938	Girls' School	Miss Honore Armstrong	
1938	There Goes My Heart	Fireless Cooker Customer	Uncredited
1939	Lucky Night	Mrs. Briggs	
1939	They Shall Have Music	Mrs. Miller	
1939	The Angels Wash Their Faces	Mrs. Arkelian	
1939	The Women	Lucy, Dude Ranch Owner	
1939	Another Thin Man	Mrs. Dolley, Landlady Chestevere Apartments	
1939	Two Thoroughbreds	Hildegarde 'Hildy' Carey	
1940	I Take This Woman	Gertie	
1940	Women Without Names	Matron Lowery	
1940	Dark Command	Mrs. Cantrell, aka Mrs. Adams	
1940	Turnabout	Nora, the cook	
1940	Susan and God	Mary Maloney	Alternative title: The Gay Mrs. Trexel
1940	The Captain Is a Lady	Sarah May Willett	
1940	Wyoming	Mehitabel	
1941	The Wild Man of Borneo	Irma	
1941	The Trial of Mary Dugan	Mrs. Collins	
1941	Barnacle Bill	Marge Cavendish	
1941	A Woman's Face	Emma Kristiansdotter	
1941	The Shepherd of the Hills	Granny Becky	
1941	Honky Tonk	Mrs. Varner	
1942	The Bugle Sounds	Susie "Suz"	
1942	We Were Dancing	Judge Sidney Hawkes	
1942	The Affairs of Martha	Mrs. McKessic	
1942	Jackass Mail	Clementine 'Tina' Tucker	
1942	Tish	Letitia "Tish" Carberry	
1942	Tennessee Johnson	Mrs. Maude Fisher	Alternative title: The Man on America's Conscience
1943	Heaven Can Wait	Mrs. Strable	
1943	Johnny Come Lately	"Gashouse" Mary	
1944	Rationing	Iris Tuttle	
1944	Meet Me in St. Louis	Katie	
1944	Gentle Annie	Annie Goss	
1945	Murder, He Says	Mamie Fleagle Smithers Johnson	
1946	The Harvey Girls	Sonora Cassidy	
1946	Bad Bascomb	Abbey Hanks	
1946	Undercurrent	Lucy	
1946	The Show-Off	Mrs. Fisher	
1947	The Egg and I	Phoebe 'Ma' Kettle	Nominated for the Academy Award for Best Supporting Actress
1947	The Wistful Widow of Wagon Gap	Widow Hawkins	Alternative title: The Wistful Widow (An Abbott & Costello film)
1948	Feudin', Fussin' and A-Fightin''	Maribel Mathews	
1949	Ma and Pa Kettle	Ma Kettle	
1949	Big Jack	Flapjack Kate	
1950	Ma and Pa Kettle Go to Town	Ma Kettle	
1950	Summer Stock	Esmé	Alternative title: If You Feel Like Singing
1950	Mrs. O'Malley and Mr. Malone	Harriet "Hattie" O'Malley	Alternative title: The Loco Motion
1951	Mr. Imperium	Mrs. Cabot	Alternative title: You Belong to My Heart
1951	Ma and Pa Kettle Back on the Farm	Ma Kettle	
1951	The Law and the Lady	Julia Wortin	
1951	It's a Big Country	Mrs. Wrenley	
1951	A Letter from a Soldier	Mrs. Wrenley	Short
1952	The Belle of New York	Mrs. Phineas Hill	
1952	Ma and Pa Kettle at the Fair	Ma Kettle	
1953	Ma and Pa Kettle on Vacation	Ma Kettle	
1953	Fast Company	Ma Parkson	
1954	The Long, Long Trailer	Mrs. Hittaway	
1954	Rose Marie	Lady Jane Dunstock	
1954	Ma and Pa Kettle at Home	Ma Kettle	
1954	Ricochet Romance	Pansy Jones	Alternative title: The Matchmakers
1955	Ma and Pa Kettle at Waikiki	Ma Kettle	
1956	The Kettles in the Ozarks	Ma Kettle	
1956	Friendly Persuasion	The Widow Hudspeth	Nominated for the Golden Globe Award for Best Supporting Actress
1957	The Kettles on Old MacDonald's Farm	Ma Kettle	final film role

=== Television ===
Year	Title	Role	Notes
1956	December Bride	Herself	Episode: "The Marjorie Main Show"
1958	Wagon Train	Cassie Tanner	2 episodes, (final appearance)
