= Rationing (film) =

1944 film by Willis Goldbeck

- Directed by: Willis Goldbeck
- Written by: Grant Garett; William Lipman; Harry Ruskin
- Produced by: Orville O. Dull
- Starring: Wallace Beery; Marjorie Main
- Cinematography: Sidney Wagner
- Edited by: Ferris Webster
- Music by: David Snell
- Distributed by: Metro-Goldwyn-Mayer
- Release date: March 24, 1944
- Running time: 93 minutes
- Country: United States
- Language: English

Rationing is a 1944 American comedy film a man dealing with an irate former fiancee and rationing in a small American town in World War II. Directed by Willis Goldbeck and distributed by Metro-Goldwyn-Mayer, the production stars Wallace Beery and features Marjorie Main.

== Plot ==
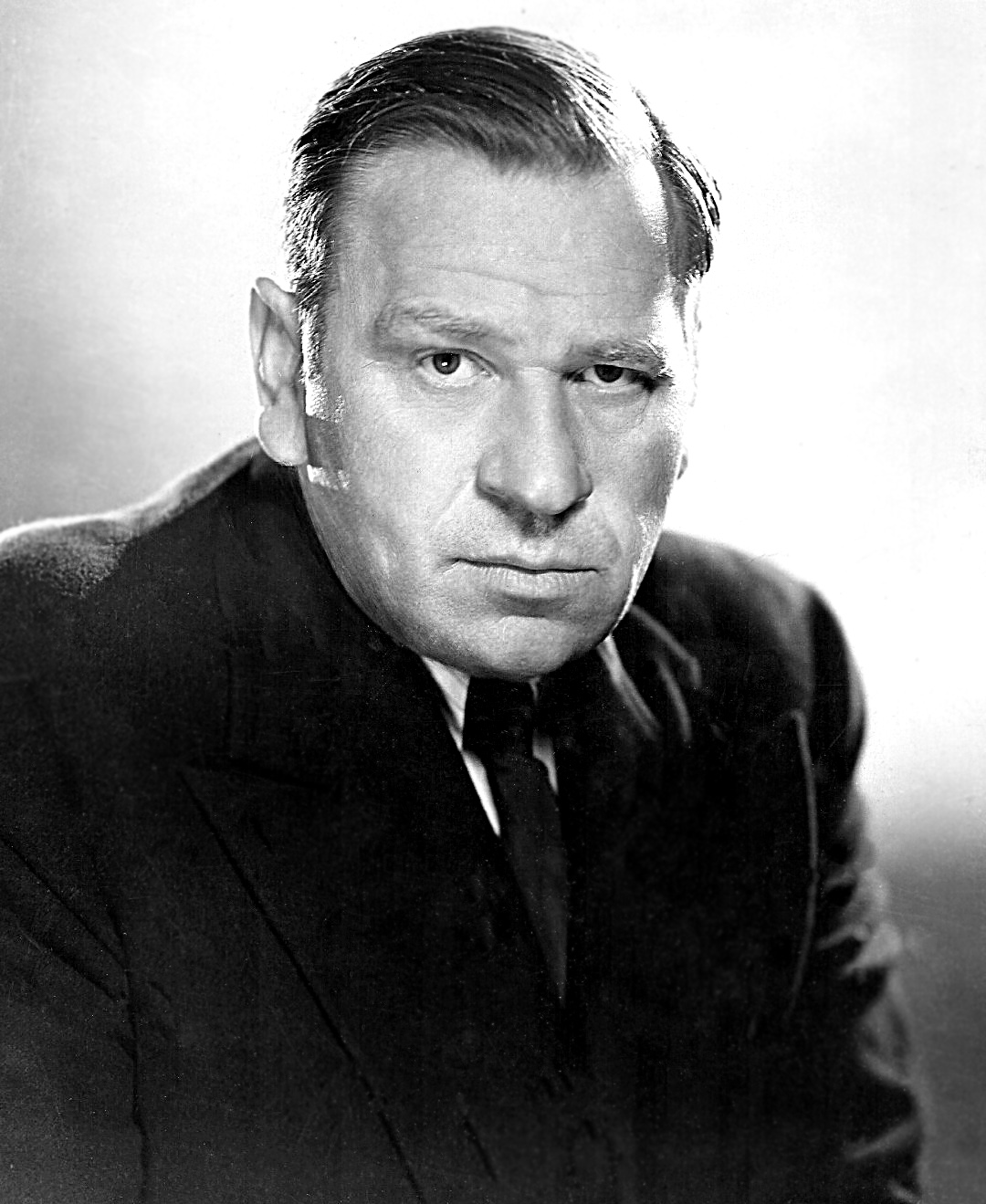
Wallace Beery as Ben Barton

During World War II, the US Government is rationing gasoline; civilians must present gas coupons at gas stations to fill up their cars. Ben Barton, a grocer in Tuttleton, is trying to get gas coupons from the local rationing board. Instead he gets a lecture on thrift from Iris Tuttle, the head of the board. Tuttle was engaged to Iris 20 years ago. However, during World War I, Ben met a French girl and inadvertently married her. Iris has been Ben's enemy ever since.

Ben also get news that his adopted son Lance Barston has joined the US Army, and wants to marry Dorothy Tuttle, Iris' daughter. Ben warns his son about his future mother-in-law Iris. To everyone's surprise, Iris approves of Dorothy marrying Lance, but advises them to wait until after the war.

Lance and Dorothy argue over this advice and she breaks off their engagement. Lance is devastated and comes to see his father, explaining that Irish would approve their marriage if he had $2,000. Ben says that he has $2,000 saved that Lance can have. In reality, Ben has to sell part of his grocery store to Cash Riddle, the owner of the gas station, to get Lance the money.

Knowing Ben's plan, Iris puts obstacles in his, stopping goods from reaching his store. At one point, she stops Ben from giving a girdle from his store to the new barber in Tuttletown, Miss McCue. Ben is forced to sneak over to her house in the night to deliver it. The next day, Iris claims she has to count the girdles in his store, following a new federal regulation. Ben must retrieve the girdle from Miss McCue to avoid suspicion.

Ben then travels to Washington D.C. to meet with his old Army buddy, Senator Ed White. Since Ed isn't available, Ben runs around the city trying find an official to "unfreeze" girdles. When Ben finally meets Ed, the senator tells him there has never been a girdle regulation. Ben asks his old friend to help him get a job for more income and Ed finds something for him. When Ben returns to Tuttletown, he discovers that his new job is on the rationing board, sharing authority with Iris.

Ben also finds out that his grocery store has been out of meat since he left town. Like gasoline, beef is another commodity that the government is rationing. Ben doesn't know that Cash has been selling the meat at a high profit on the black market with an accomplice named Dixie Samson. They give Ben six sides of beef to keep him happy. This sudden influx of beef at Ben's grocery arouses suspicion among other butchers in the area. Starting to get suspicious himself, Ben demands to meet the US Government official that Cash has been dealing with. Instead, Samson arrives at a meeting with Ben, posing as the representative. He then offers Ben a bribe to remain quiet.

Realizing that Cash is running a criminal operation, Ben pretends to go along with this and demands a $5,000 bribe from Samson. After his conversation with Samson, Ben reports the scheme to Ed, who travels to Tuttletown to investigate the situation.

Ben and Ed then find Samson's slaughterhouse and Ben goes inside to confront Samson. However, Samson and his gang lock Ben in a room. Realizing that Ben needed help, Ed returns to town to quickly gather a posse and return to the slaughter house. When Cash arrives, Ben persuades him to unlock the door. A fight breaks out between Ben and Samson. Ed and the townspeople rush inside, fight Samson's gang, and rescue Ben. Cash and Samson are apprehended by the police

Meanwhile, Lance has returned to Tuttletown on a leave from the Army and is preparing to marry Dorothy. After returning to town, Ben learns that Iris had purchased Cash's share of Ben's grocery store. The two are now business partners. Ben does not want Iris as a partner, but realizes that the legal costs to dissolve the partnership were too expensive.

== Production ==
Rationing featured Wallace Beery daughter, Carol Ann Beery, in a minor role. The film proved to be popular, especially among audiences of service members. When it was originally previewed to the Office of Censorship for overseas distribution, the censors objected to its heavy emphasis on rationing in the United States. After MGM made a few eliminations, the Office approved its foreign release in January 1945.

== Cast ==
- Wallace Beery as Ben Barton
- Marjorie Main as Iris Tuttle
- Donald Meek as Wilfred Ball
- Dorothy Morris as Dorothy Tuttle
- Howard Freeman as Cash Riddle
- Connie Gilchrist as Mrs. Porter
- Tommy Batten as Lance Barton
- Gloria Dickson as Miss McCue
- Henry O'Neill as Sen. Edward White
- Richard Hall as Teddy
- Charles Halton as Ezra Weeks
- Morris Ankrum as Mr. Morgan
- Douglas Fowley as Dixie Samson
- Chester Clute as Roberts
- Chill Wills as Bus driver
- Carol Ann Beery as Carol Ann

== See also ==
Wallace Beery and Marjorie Main also appear in the following films:

- Wyoming (1940)
- Barnacle Bill (1941)
- Jackass Mail (1942)
- The Bugle Sounds (1942)
- Bad Bascomb (1946)
- Big Jack (1949)
