= Tish (1942 film) =

1942 film by S. Sylvan Simon

- Directed by: S. Sylvan Simon
- Written by: Mary Roberts Rinehart
- Screenplay by: Harry Ruskin; Tom Seller; Annalee Whitmore
- Based on: Tish in The Saturday Evening Post by Mary Roberts Rinehart
- Produced by: Orville O. Dull
- Starring: Marjorie Main; ZaSu Pitts; Susan Peters
- Cinematography: Paul C. Vogel
- Edited by: Robert Kern
- Music by: David Snell; Daniele Amfitheatrof
- Distributed by: Metro-Goldwyn-Mayer
- Release date: 1942
- Running time: 84 min.
- Country: United States
- Language: English
- Budget: $282,000
- Box office: $688,000

Tish is a 1942 comedy-drama film directed by S. Sylvan Simon and starring Marjorie Main, ZaSu Pitts, and Aline MacMahon.

== Cast ==
- Marjorie Main as Miss Letitia "Tish" Carberry
- ZaSu Pitts as Aggie Pilkington
- Aline MacMahon as Lizzie Wilkins
- Lee Bowman as Charles "Charlie" Sands, Tish's nephew
- Guy Kibbee as Judge Horace Bowser
- Susan Peters as Cora Edwards Bowzer
- Virginia Grey as Katherine "Kit" Bowser Sands
- Richard Quine as Theodore "Ted" Bowser

== Reception ==
Tish made $576,000 in the U.S. and Canada and $112,000 foreign markets, making MGM a net profit of $160,000.
