= Big Jack (film) =

1949 film by Richard Thorpe

- Theatrical release poster
- Directed by: Richard Thorpe
- Written by: Robert Thoeren (novel); Gene Fowler; Otto Eis
- Produced by: Gottfried Reinhardt
- Starring: Wallace Beery; Richard Conte; Marjorie Main; Edward Arnold
- Cinematography: Robert Surtees
- Edited by: George Boemler
- Music by: Herbert Stothart
- Production company: Metro-Goldwyn-Mayer
- Distributed by: Loew's Inc.
- Release date: April 12, 1949
- Running time: 85 minutes
- Country: United States
- Language: English
- Budget: $869,000
- Box office: $915,000

Big Jack is a 1949 American Western film starring Wallace Beery, Richard Conte and Marjorie Main. The movie was directed by Richard Thorpe, and the screenplay was written by Gene Fowler and Otto Eis from the novel by Robert Thoeren. The picture is a comedy-drama, set on the American frontier in the early 1800s, about outlaws who befriend a young doctor in legal trouble for acquiring corpses for anatomical research.

This was Wallace Beery's final film, believed to be his 230th. He died on April 15, 1949, at age 64, three days after this movie's release. Also the final film to have a musical score by Herbert Stothart, who had died two months before the film's release.

== Cast ==
- Wallace Beery as Big Jack Horner
- Richard Conte as Dr. Alexander Meade
- Marjorie Main as Flapjack Kate
- Edward Arnold as Mayor Mahoney
- Vanessa Brown as Patricia Mahoney
- Clinton Sundberg as C. Petronius Smith
- Charles Dingle as Mathias Taylor
- Clem Bevans as Saltlick Joe
- Jack Lambert as Bud Valentine
- Will Wright as Will Farnsworth
- William Phillips as Toddy
- Syd Saylor as Pokey
- Andy Clyde as Putt Clegghorn
- Richard Alexander as Bandit (uncredited)

== Reception ==
According to MGM records the film earned $759,000 in the US and Canada and $156,000 elsewhere, resulting in a $291,000 loss.

== See also ==
The other six Wallace Beery and Marjorie Main films:

- Wyoming (1940)
- Barnacle Bill (1941)
- Jackass Mail (1942)
- The Bugle Sounds (1942)
- Rationing (1944)
- Bad Bascomb (1946)
