= Jackass Mail =

1942 film by Norman Z. McLeod

- Directed by: Norman Z. McLeod
- Written by: C. Gardner Sullivan (story); Lawrence Hazard (screenplay); Lionel Houser (uncredited)
- Produced by: John W. Considine Jr.
- Starring: Wallace Beery; Marjorie Main
- Cinematography: Clyde De Vinna
- Edited by: Gene Roggiero
- Music by: David Snell
- Distributed by: Metro Goldwyn Mayer
- Release date: 1942
- Running time: 79 minutes
- Country: United States
- Language: English
- Budget: $666,000
- Box office: $1,305,000

Jackass Mail is a 1942 Western comedy film directed by Norman Z. McLeod and starring Wallace Beery and Marjorie Main.

== Plot ==
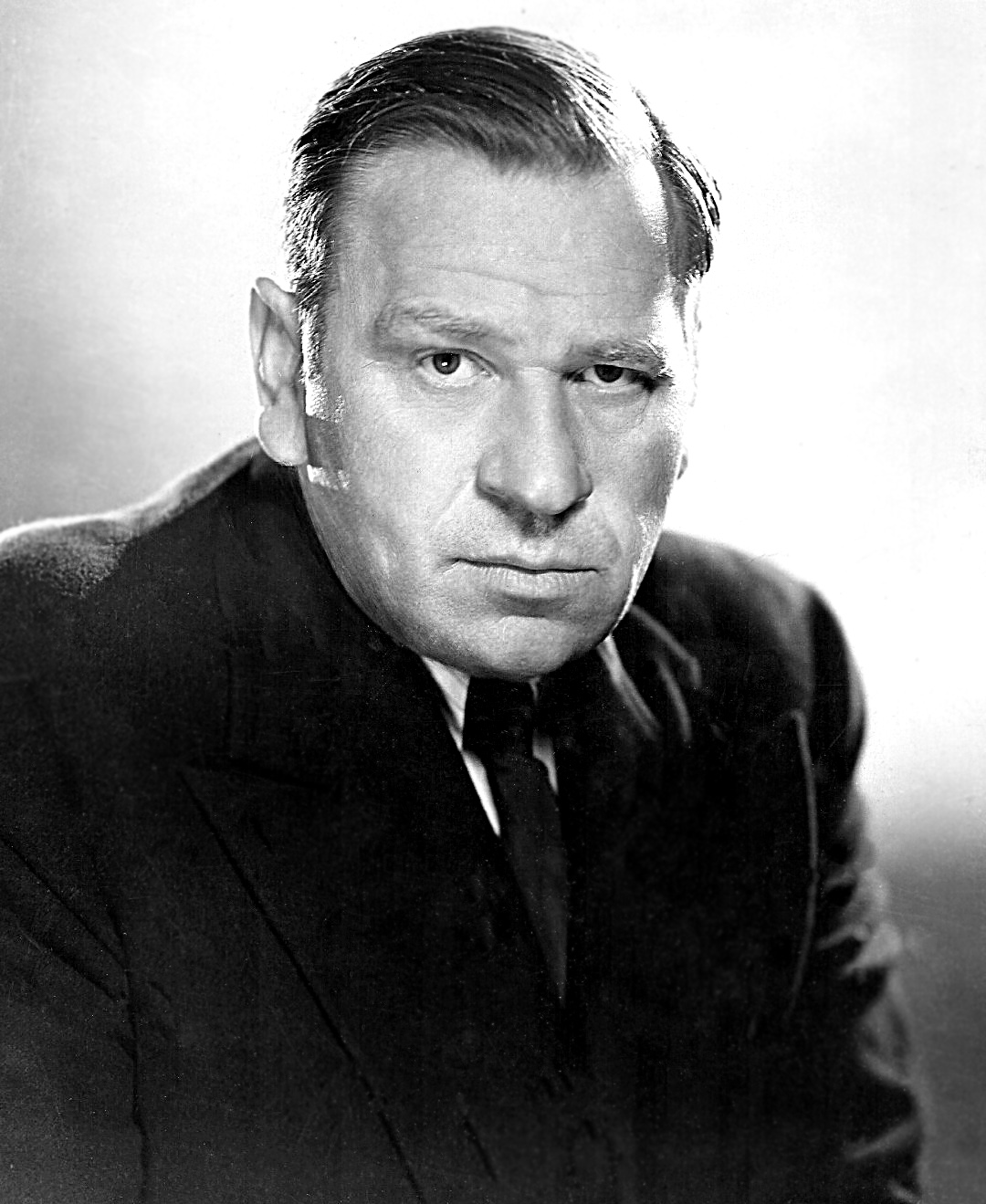
Wallace Beery as Just Baggott

The film starts with a small boy wondering why his town is named after his grandfather, Just Baggott, whom he heard was a horse thief. Someone tells him the story.

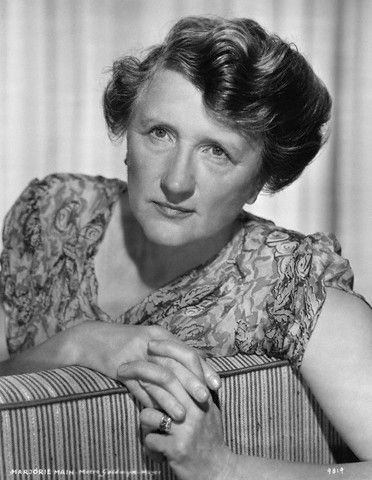
Marjorie Main as Clementine "Tiny" Tucker (1940)

Just Baggott is a small-time criminal in Gold Camp, California, a 19th century mining town in Northern California. One day, he enters the saloon and starts conversing with Signor Michael O'Sullivan, the disreputable Italian-Irish bartender. Baggott brags about having a map to a hidden gold mine. Suddenly, some men come in the door and accuse Baggott of stealing their horses. Signor helps Baggott escape out the back of the saloon. In the process, he steals Baggott's map. However, he quickly discovers that the map is a laundry list that the illiterate Baggott could not read. The two men then start scheming to rob the "Jackass Mail", which regularly transports gold from Gold Camp to Sacramento, California. Clementine "Tiny" Tucker owns the wagon and her driver is Hickory Jake. She also owns the saloon.

Baggott and Signor ride out of town and hide in waiting for the Jackass Mail to come down the road. The wagon appears, but it is suddenly attacked by Jim Swade and Red Gargan. During the fight, Hickory is killed. Baggott then rides up to the wagon and chases away Swade and Gargan. Tiny is suspicious of Baggott, but lets him drive the wagon. When they stop, Baggott ties her up and gets ready to steal the gold. Tiny then suggests that they steal the gold together and split the take. Baggott is so enamored of Tiny that he agrees and unties her. She then pulls a gun on him and reveals that the Jackass Mail is not carrying gold today.

Tiny senses that Baggott is basically a good man; she holsters her gun and tells him that he can be her new driver. A few days later, Baggot makes a mail delivery of a pocket watch to Tommy Gargan, the son of Red Gargan. He has no money for the delivery fee, but Baggott gives him the package anyway. Back in Gold Camp, Baggotts sees Red, recognizing him as one of the stage robbers. However, Baggott says nothing to anyone. He soon finds out that Tiny owns the saloon and entertains the crowd in a skimpy outfit. Tiny in turn chastises Baggott for his alcohol abuse.

One day, while Baggott is at Tiny's saloon, Red and Swade walk in. Tiny then reveals to Baggott that Red used to be her driver, but she fired him over his association with Swade. When Baggott confronts Red and Swade, they draw their guns, but Baggott kills Red. Swade escapes the saloon. Tiny then makes everyone promise not to tell Tommy how Red died.

With Red dead, Tommy asks Baggott the next day if he could live with him. Tiny thinks it is a good idea and suggests that they ride the Jackass Mail together. Soon, inspired by the adoring Tommy, Baggott gives up alcohol and allows Tiny to hold his salary for him. Tiny then uses her money and his to help finance a railroad stop for the town. Baggott is not happy about Tiny using his money for this railroad project.

Signor then approaches Baggott, who is now drinking again. Signor says that the Jackass Mail wagon tomorrow will be transporting a strong box contain thousands of dollars of the town's railroad money. While Baggott and Tommy are driving, Signor would fake a robbery, with him and Baggott later dividing the spoils. The following day, Baggott and Tommy are driving the wagon. Instead of Signor, a masked Swade shows up to rob it. Thinking the bandit is Signor, Baggott does not resist. However, Tommy shoots and slightly Swade, who drops the strong box while fleeing. Tommy is also wounded by Swade.

A distraught Baggott rushes Tommy to a doctor in town. While waiting for Tommy to be treated, Baggott admits to himself that he is very fond of the boy and promises to permanently give up alcohol if he gets well. Later, Tiny and a recovered Tommy take Baggott to a temperance meeting, at which she announces that she is going to close her saloon. While at the meeting, Baggott accidentally he drops a liquor bottle that Signor planted on him. Baggott then swears that he did not drink from it and would never lie to Tommy. Baggott later warns Signor to never tell Tommy who shot his father. On another occasion, Baggott breaks a guitar over Signor's head, thinking that he is romancing Tiny. While playing faro at the saloon, Baggot bets $5,000 in winnings on one card. Although disappointed, Tiny takes the bet. He wins. Baggott then says that if he wins again, he wants Tiny to marry him. She happily accepts his proposal when he wins.

One month later, Gold Camp, now called Baggott City, has a church, a school, and a railroad station. The town is awaiting the arrival of the first train. For some unknown reason, Baggott and Signor are allowed to drive the locomotive into town. Their only cargo is several boxes labeled "hymn books." As they approach the station, Baggott and Signor realize they don't know how to stop the locomotive. It crashes and the boxes spill open, revealing liquor bottles instead of hymn books.

Signor is responsible for the smuggling, but Tommy and Tina blame Baggott. Tommy thinks Baggott lied to him and Tiny says she cannot marry a man she cannot trust. That night, Baggott plans to leave Baggott City with Signor and Tommy. When Tommy says he doesn't want to go, Baggott thinks that Signor has told him the truth about Red's shooting. Baggott inadvertently reveals the truth to Tommy. The heartbroken boy draws a gun on him, but then just leaves.

Meanwhile, Swade and his gang are planning another robbery. While riding by Tommy, he overhears their plan. The next day, as Tiny and other townswomen ride the train toward Sacramento, Baggott and Signor ride on top of the train cars as part of their own robbery plan. When Swade and his gang stop the train and board the passenger compartment, the women refuse to cooperate. Signor and Baggott then rush in and fight off Swade's. Just then, a group of vigilantes led byTommy arrive at the train. All the townspeople assume that Signor and Baggott were secretly guarding the train. Baggott then rides off chasing Swade, whom he eventually captures. The townspeople declare Baggott a hero. Tommy and Tiny are very proud and she demands that Baggott marry her.

== Cast ==
- Wallace Beery as Marmaduke 'Just' Baggott
- Marjorie Main as Clementine 'Tina' Tucker
- J. Carrol Naish as Signor Michael O'Sullivan
- Darryl Hickman as Tommy Gargan
- William Haade as Red Gargan
- Dick Curtis as Jim Swade
- Hobart Cavanaugh as Gospel Jones
- Joe Yule as Barky
- King Baggot as Old Miner (uncredited)
- Paul Newlan as Rancher with Gun on Baggott (uncredited)

== Reception ==
According to MGM records the film earned $1,013,000 in the US and Canada and $292,000 elsewhere, making the studio a profit of $230,000.

== See also ==
The other six Wallace Beery and Marjorie Main films:

- Wyoming (1940)
- Barnacle Bill (1941)
- The Bugle Sounds (1942)
- Rationing (1944)
- Bad Bascomb (1946)
- Big Jack (1949)

== Production ==
Locations used for the filming included the Keene Camp Resort in the San Jacinto Mountains of Southern California. Other locations included Calabasas, Idyllwild and Chatsworth in Riverside County, California.
