= Bad Bascomb (film) =

1946 film by S. Sylvan Simon

- Theatrical poster
- Directed by: S. Sylvan Simon
- Written by: D. A. Loxley (story); William R. Lipman; Grant Garett
- Produced by: Orville O. Dull
- Starring: Wallace Beery; Margaret O'Brien; Marjorie Main; J. Carrol Naish
- Cinematography: Charles Schoenbaum
- Edited by: Ben Lewis
- Music by: David Snell
- Production company: Metro-Goldwyn-Mayer
- Distributed by: Loew's, Inc.
- Release date: May 22, 1946
- Running time: 112 minutes
- Country: United States
- Language: English
- Budget: $1,833,000
- Box office: $3,645,000

Bad Bascomb is a 1946 American Western film starring Wallace Beery and Margaret O'Brien. The movie was directed by S. Sylvan Simon. The supporting cast features Marjorie Main, J. Carrol Naish, Frances Rafferty, Marshall Thompson and Henry O'Neill.

== Plot ==
Zed "Bad" Bascomb and Bart Yancey are two outlaws who are being chased by federal marshalls in the 19th century West. To avoid capture, they hide out in a Mormon wagon train heading west to the Utah Territory. When Bascomb and Yancy discover that the wagon train is transporting a hidden gold treasure, they decide to stay with the Mormons until they can steal it.

Over time, a rambunctious little girl named Emmy attaches herself to Bascomb. Bascomb and Yancey perform various chores for the Mormons while plotting to steal the gold. Bascomb gradually becomes fond of Emmy and her somewhat overbearing grandmother, Abbey Hanks, who also has taken a fancy to Bascomb.

When Yancy finally tries to steal the gold, Bascomb thwarts him. Yancy then persuades an Indian band to attack the wagon train in another theft attempt. However, Bascomb rides to a US Army fort to get help, saving the wagon train. In the end, Bascomb surrenders to the marshals, who chose not to reveal his true identity to the Mormons.

== Cast ==
- Wallace Beery as Zed Bascomb
- Margaret O'Brien as Emmy
- Marjorie Main as Abbey Hanks
- J. Carrol Naish as Bart Yancey
- Frances Rafferty as Dora McCabe
- Russell Simpson as Elijah Walker
- Marshall Thompson as Jimmy Holden
- Henry O'Neill as Governor Winton
- Sara Haden as Tillie Lovejoy
- Frank Darien as Elder Moab McCabe
- Stanley Andrews as Col. Cartright (uncredited)
- Joseph Crehan as Gov. Ames (uncredited)

== Reception ==
According to MGM records the film earned $2,384,000 in the US and Canada and $1,261,000 elsewhere, leading to an overall profit of $648,000.

== See also ==
The other six Wallace Beery and Marjorie Main films:

- Wyoming (1940)
- Barnacle Bill (1941)
- Jackass Mail (1942)
- The Bugle Sounds (1942)
- Rationing (1944)
- Big Jack (1949)
