= The Adventures of Long John Silver =

- Genre: Adventure
- Created by: Martin Rackin; Byron Haskin; Joseph Kaufman; Robert Louis Stevenson
- Written by: Martin Rackin; Kay Keavney
- Directed by: Byron Haskin; Lee Sholem
- Starring: Robert Newton; Connie Gilchrist; Kit Taylor
- Country of origin: Australia
- Original language: English
- No. of seasons: 1
- No. of episodes: 26

Production
- Producer: Joseph Kaufman
- Running time: 30 minutes
- Production companies: Isola del'Oro; Treasure Island Productions

Original release
- Network: ABC
- Release: 1958 – 1958

The Adventures of Long John Silver is a TV series about the Long John Silver character from Robert Louis Stevenson's 1883 novel Treasure Island. It was made in 1954 in colour in Australia for the American and British markets before the development of Australian television.

== Cast and characters ==
- Robert Newton as Long John Silver
- Connie Gilchrist as Purity Pinker
- Kit Taylor as Jim Hawkins
- Grant Taylor as Patch
- Eric Reiman as Trip Fenner
- John Brunskill as Old Stingley
- Harry Hambleton as Big Eric
- Gordon Chater as Alfredo
- Ray Barrett as Paul

Newton and several of the other actors had the same roles as in the 1954 film Long John Silver, also shot in Australia.

== Broadcast history ==
The series was shown in the United States from 22 September 1955, and in the UK on ITV in 1957. It was shown in Australia on the ABC in 1958, in the afternoon Children's TV Club. It was also shown on commercial regional TV in the mid to late 70s in Australia. In 1985 the series was repeated in the United Kingdom in a Saturday afternoon slot on ITV.

For much of its international audience, the series aired after the death of its star, Robert Newton, who had died of a heart attack in Hollywood in March 1956.

== Episodes ==
No.	Title
1	"The Necklace"
Silver is arrested for murder
2	"Pieces of Eight"
Silver and his crew search for Spanish gold with a sailor (Albert Garcia)
3	"The Orphans' Christmas"
Hawkins and Silver help out at an orphanage run by a woman (Neva Carr-Glynn) who hates Christmas
4	"Execution Dock"
Silver falls ill and has nightmares about being put on trial for old crimes
5	"The Eviction"
6	"The Pink Pearl"
7	"Tale of a Tooth"
8	"Ship o' the Dead"
Jim sees a ship full of dead people but no one believes him
9	"Sword of Vengeance"
10	"Turnabout"
Silver is captured by a French captain (David Nettheim)
11	"Miss Purity's Birthday"
12	"Dead Reckoning"
13	"Devil's Stew"
14	"Where Men Are Men"
15	"The Master's Touch"
16	"The Siege"
17	"The Flag Flies Back"
18	"The Fish Wife"
19	"Dragon Slayer"
20	"Temple of Evil"
21	"To Purity, a Daughter"
22	"Ties of Blood"
23	"Strange Cargo"
24	"Infernal Cargo"
25	"The Crisis"

== Production ==
Joseph Kaufman produced the series, and CBS -TV Film Sales distributed it. Filming was done in a studio in Sydney, Australia.

Lee Sholem later recalled, "That was a real fun show... and we had a magnificent company. And the salaries of the stars, except for Robert Newton, the highest paid actor got $200 a week. These actors in Australia were cheap as dirt. Of course, the dollar went a long way over there. We had a... regular cast of 18. Some of the stories and some of the acting were damn good."

== See also ==
- List of live television plays broadcast on Australian Broadcasting Corporation (1950s)
- List of television plays broadcast on ATN-7
