= Blossom Rock =

American actress (1895–1978)

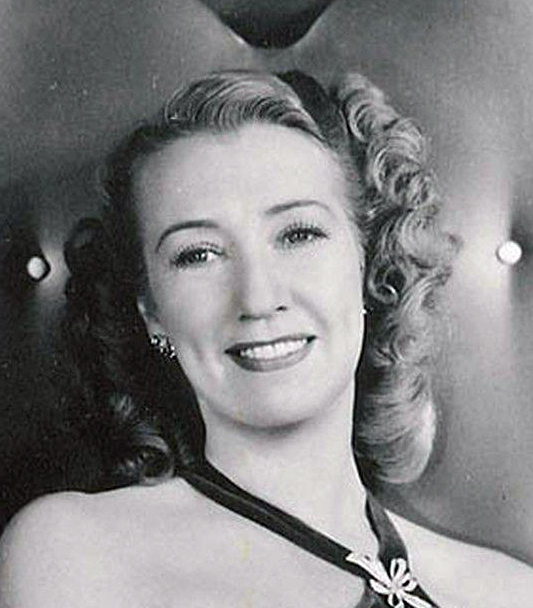
- Born: Edith Marie Blossom McDonald; August 21, 1895; Philadelphia, Pennsylvania, U.S.
- Died: January 14, 1978 (aged 82); Los Angeles, California, U.S.
- Resting place: Forest Lawn Memorial Park, Glendale, Memory Slope #1183
- Other names: Blossom Rock; Blossom MacDonald; Marie Blake
- Occupations: Actress, vaudevillian
- Years active: 1923–1966
- Spouse: Clarence Warren Rock (m. 1926; died 1960)
- Relatives: Jeanette MacDonald (sister)

Edith Marie Blossom MacDonald (August 21, 1895 – January 14, 1978), also known as Blossom Rock, was an American actress of vaudeville, stage, film and television. During her career she was also billed as Marie Blake or Blossom MacDonald. Her younger sister was screen actress and singer Jeanette MacDonald. Rock is best known for her role as "Grandmama" on the 1960s macabre/black comedy sitcom The Addams Family.

== Personal life ==
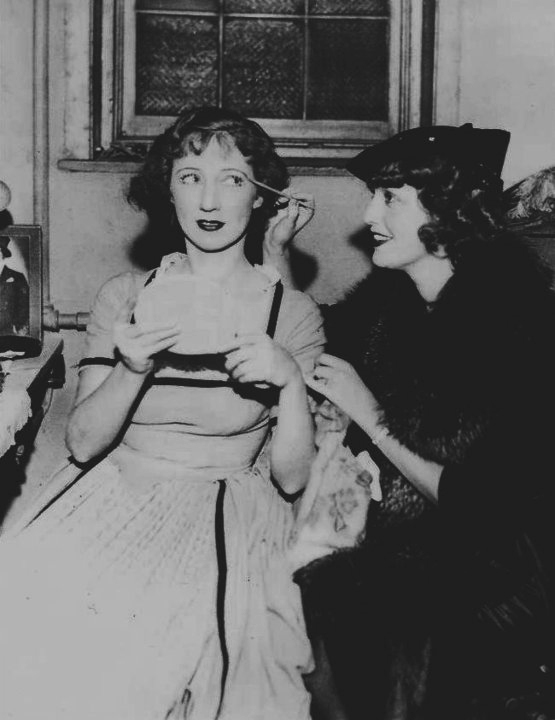
Blossom Rock with her sister Jeanette MacDonald

Blossom Rock was born on August 21, 1895, in Philadelphia, Pennsylvania. She was the second of three daughters born to Anna May (née Wright) and Daniel McDonald. The family later changed the spelling of their last name to MacDonald. As a youth, Blossom first performed in vaudeville with her younger sister, Jeanette. She had an elder sister, Elsie Wallace MacDonald, who had also been a vaudeville performer and then operated a dance school until 1962.

She married actor Clarence Warren Rock, on September 26, 1926, in Manhattan, and they performed as a vaudeville act titled "Rock and Blossom" from 1925 to 1929. Clarence Rock died in 1960, and the couple had no children.

== Career ==
Rock adopted the name Marie Blake for her film career, beginning as a Metro-Goldwyn-Mayer contract player in 1937 with an uncredited appearance in My Dear Miss Aldrich. Her first credited major part was Love Finds Andy Hardy (1938), and she then played her most notable onscreen role as Sally, the hospital switchboard operator, in the nine films that comprised MGM's popular Dr. Kildare series from 1938 to 1942. She once had the same agent as Irene Ryan, whose similar career later caused Rock to fire him.

Rock returned to using her real name in the 1950s, and later gained her biggest fame by playing "Grandmama" on the ABC sitcom The Addams Family, which was originally broadcast from 1964 to 1966. In October 1964, she made a public appearance in character at a haunted house at The Children's Museum of Indianapolis.

== Illness and death ==
Rock suffered a stroke in December 1967 that affected her speech and prevented her from reuniting with fellow castmates for the 1977 television film Halloween with the New Addams Family. However, she reportedly watched the film from the Motion Picture & Television Country House and Hospital. She died at age 82 on January 14, 1978, in Los Angeles, and was interred in Forest Lawn Memorial Park in Glendale

== Selected filmography ==
- My Dear Miss Aldrich (1937) as Telephone Operator (scenes deleted)
- Thoroughbreds Don't Cry (1937) as Hospital Telephone Operator (uncredited)
- Mannequin (1937) as Mrs. Schwartz (uncredited)
- Love Is a Headache (1938) as Hillier's Secretary (uncredited)
- Woman Against Woman (1938) as Miss Van Horn — Ellen's New Nursemaid (uncredited)
- Love Finds Andy Hardy (1938) as Augusta
- Rich Man, Poor Girl (1938) as Mrs. Gussler
- Three Loves Has Nancy (1938) as Second Woman Getting Autograph (uncredited)
- Vacation from Love (1938) as Bill's Receptionist (uncredited)
- Young Dr. Kildare (1938) as Miss Sally Green (uncredited)
- Dramatic School (1938) as Annette
- The Ice Follies of 1939 (1939) as Effie Lane — Tolliver's Secretary (uncredited)
- Blind Alley (1939) as Harriet
- Calling Dr. Kildare (1939) as Sally
- The Women (1939) as Stockroom Girl (uncredited)
- The Secret of Dr. Kildare (1939) as Sally — Telephone Operator
- Day-Time Wife (1939) as Singing Telegram Operator (uncredited)
- A Child Is Born (1939) as Ethel — Reception Nurse (uncredited)
- Judge Hardy and Son (1939) as Augusta McBride
- Alfalfa's Aunt (1939 MGM Short) as Aunt Penelope
- The Man Who Wouldn't Talk (1940) as (uncredited)
- Dr. Kildare's Strange Case (1940) as Sally, Hospital Switchboard Operator
- Sailor's Lady (1940) as Beauty Operator (uncredited)
- They Drive by Night (1940) as Waitress (uncredited)
- Dr. Kildare Goes Home (1940) as Sally
- They Knew What They Wanted (1940) as Waitress (uncredited)
- Li'l Abner (1940) as Miss Lulubell
- Gallant Sons (1940) as Woman Helping to Look For Ring (uncredited)
- Dr. Kildare's Crisis (1940) as Sally, Hospital Receptionist
- Jennie (1940) as Minor Role
- You're the One (1941) as Beauty Shop Operator
- Here Comes Happiness (1941) as Clara
- The People vs. Dr. Kildare (1941) as Sally
- Caught in the Draft (1941) as Nurse with Castor Oil (uncredited)
- Dr. Kildare's Wedding Day (1941) as Sally
- Remember the Day (1941) as Miss Cartwright
- Blue, White and Perfect (1942) as Ethel
- Dr. Kildare's Victory (1942) as Sally
- The Wife Takes a Flyer (1942) as Frieda (uncredited)
- A Desperate Chance for Ellery Queen (1942) as Motel Landlady (uncredited)
- Small Town Deb (1942) as Beauty Operator
- Calling Dr. Gillespie (1942) as Sally, Receptionist
- Give Out, Sisters (1942) as Biandina Waverly
- I Married a Witch (1942) as Purity Sykes (uncredited)
- Dr. Gillespie's New Assistant (1942) as Sally
- Good Morning, Judge (1943) as Nicky Clark
- Dr. Gillespie's Criminal Case (1943) as Sally
- All by Myself (1943) as Miss Ryan (uncredited)
- Campus Rhythm (1943) as Susie Smith — Hartman's Secretary
- Whispering Footsteps (1943) as Sally Lukens, boarder
- Make Your Own Bed (1944) as Woman Jerry Mistakes for Susan (uncredited)
- South of Dixie (1944) as Ruby
- Sensations of 1945 (1944) as Miss Grear (uncredited)
- Gildersleeve's Ghost (1944) as Harriet Morgan
- The Unwritten Code (1944) as Nurse (uncredited)
- Roughly Speaking (1945) as Nurse (uncredited)
- Keep Your Powder Dry (1945) as WAC Supply Corporal (uncredited)
- Between Two Women (1945) as Sally
- Pillow to Post (1945) as Wilbur's Mother (scenes deleted)
- Christmas in Connecticut (1945) as Mrs. Wright (uncredited)
- Abbott and Costello in Hollywood (1945) as Royce's Secretary (uncredited)
- Gentleman Joe Palooka (1946) as Maid
- Fun on a Weekend (1947) as Mr. Prigee's Secretary (uncredited)
- Dark Delusion (1947) as Sally
- Christmas Eve (1947) as Reporter (uncredited)
- Mourning Becomes Electra (1947) as Minnie Ames
- The Gangster (1947) as House Mistress (uncredited)
- An Innocent Affair (1948) as Hilda — the Maid
- The Girl from Manhattan (1948) as Committeewoman (uncredited)
- The Snake Pit (1948) as Patient Awaiting Staff (uncredited)
- Bad Boy (1949) as Miss Worth (uncredited)
- Alimony (1949) as Mrs. Nesbitt
- Angels in Disguise (1949) as Millie (uncredited)
- Chicago Deadline (1949) as Telephone Operataor (uncredited)
- Sons of New Mexico (1949) as Hannah Dobbs
- Paid in Full (1950) as Tired Woman Patient (uncredited)
- A Woman of Distinction (1950) as Wax Operator (uncredited)
- Joe Palooka in the Squared Circle (1950) as Prunella, Humphrey's Sister (uncredited)
- Love Nest (1951) as Mrs. Quigg (uncredited)
- F.B.I. Girl (1951) as Landlady
- Gobs and Gals (1952) as Bertram's Mother
- The Star (1952) as Annie, Stones' Maid (uncredited)
- Small Town Girl (1953) as Customer (uncredited)
- Phantom of the Rue Morgue (1954) as Marie (uncredited)
- The Human Jungle (1954) as Mrs. Ashton (uncredited)
- Hilda Crane (1956) as Clara — Mrs. Crane's Housekeeper
- The Desperados Are in Town (1956) as Mrs. Green (uncredited)
- She Devil (1957) as Hannah — the Housekeeper
- The Way to the Gold (1957) as Mrs. Lattimer
- From the Terrace (1960) as Nellie (uncredited)
- Swingin' Along (1961) as Woman in Apartment No. 1 (uncredited)
- Snow White and the Three Stooges (1961) as Servant (uncredited)
- The Second Time Around (1961) as Mrs. Vera Collins
- The New Phil Silvers Show (1964, TV series, episode "How to Succeed in Business Without Crying") as Mother Gilhooley
- The Best Man (1964) as Cleaning Woman
- The Addams Family (1964–1966, TV series) as Grandmama
