= Walter Kingsford =

English actor

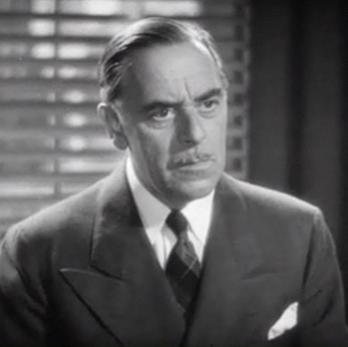
- Walter Kingsford in Calling Dr. Gillespie
- Born: Walter Pearce; 20 September 1881; Redhill, Surrey, England
- Died: 7 February 1958 (aged 76); North Hollywood, Los Angeles, California, U.S.
- Resting place: Grand View Memorial Park Cemetery
- Occupation: Actor
- Years active: 1930–1958
- Spouses: Winifred Hanley (m. 1905); Alison Bradshaw (m. 1928; died 1950)
- Children: 1

Walter Kingsford (born Walter Pearce; 20 September 1881 – 7 February 1958) was an English stage, film, and television actor.

== Early years ==
Kingsford was born in Redhill, Surrey, England.

== Career ==
Kingsford began his acting career on the London stage. He also had a long Broadway career, appearing in plays from the 1912 original American production of George Bernard Shaw's Fanny's First Play to 1944's Song of Norway.

In the early 1920s, Kingford was active with the Henry Jewett Players.

Kingsford moved to Hollywood, California, for a prolific film career in supporting parts. On screen, he specialised in portraying authority figures such as noblemen, heads of state, doctors, police inspectors and lawyers. He is best known for his recurring role as the snobbish hospital head Dr. P. Walter Carew in the popular Dr. Kildare (and Dr. Gillespie) film series.

Kingsford had numerous television appearances in the 1950s. They included TV Reader's Digest, Command Performance and Science Fiction Theatre.

== Personal life ==
Kingsford was married to actress Winifred Hanley. They had a son, Guy Kingsford.

Kingsford died of a heart attack in Hollywood in 1958, aged 76. He was cremated and his ashes scattered on the grounds of Grand View Memorial Park Cemetery in Glendale, California.

== Complete filmography ==
- Sherlock Holmes (1922) as Gunman at apartment window (uncredited)
- Outward Bound (1930) as The Policeman (uncredited)
- The Trans-Atlantic Mystery (1932, Short) as Dodge - Miller's Valet (uncredited)
- The Pursuit of Happiness (1934) as Reverend Lyman Banks
- The President Vanishes (1934) as Martin Drew
- The White Cockatoo (1935) as Marcus Lovscheim
- The Mystery of Edwin Drood (1935) as Hiram Grewgious
- Naughty Marietta (1935) as Don Carlos
- Shanghai (1935) as Hilton
- The Melody Lingers On (1935) as Croce
- I Found Stella Parish (1935) as Reeves
- A Tale of Two Cities (1935) as Victor (uncredited)
- Professional Soldier (1935) as Christian Ledgard
- The Invisible Ray (1936) as Sir Francis Stevens
- The Story of Louis Pasteur (1936) as Napoleon III
- The Music Goes 'Round (1936) as Cobham
- Little Lord Fauntleroy (1936) as Mr. Snade
- Frankie and Johnny (1936) as Timothy
- Speed (1936) as Uncle Edward Emery (uncredited)
- Trouble for Two (1936) as Malthus
- Hearts Divided (1936) as Pichon
- Meet Nero Wolfe (1936) as Emanuel Jeremiah (E.J.) Kimball
- Anthony Adverse (1936) as Minor Role (uncredited)
- Mad Holiday (1936) as Ben Kelvin
- Bulldog Drummond Escapes (1937) as Stanton
- Stolen Holiday (1937) as Francis Chalon
- Maytime (1937) as Mr. Rudyard
- Captains Courageous (1937) as Dr. Finley
- The League of Frightened Men (1937) as Ferdinand Bowen
- The Devil is Driving (1937) as Louis Wooster
- It Could Happen to You (1937) as Professor Schwab
- The Life of Emile Zola (1937) as Colonel Sandherr
- Double or Nothing (1937) as Mr. Dobson
- My Dear Miss Aldrich (1937) as Mr. Talbot
- Behind the Criminal (1937, Short) as Robert Carver
- I'll Take Romance (1937) as William Kane
- Algiers (1938) as Louvain
- Paradise for Three (1938) as William Reichenbach
- A Yank at Oxford (1938) as Dean Williams
- There's Always a Woman (1938) as Grigson
- The Lone Wolf in Paris (1938) as Grand Duke Gregor de Meyerson
- The Toy Wife (1938) as Judge Rondell
- Lord Jeff (1938) as Superintendent
- The Young in Heart (1938) as Inspector
- Carefree (1938) as Dr. Powers
- If I Were King (1938) as Tristan l'Hermite
- Young Dr. Kildare (1938) as Dr. P. Walter Carew
- Say It in French (1938) as Hopkins
- Smashing the Spy Ring (1938) as Dr. L.B. Carter
- Juarez (1939) as Prince Richard Metternich
- Calling Dr. Kildare (1939) as Dr. 'Walter' Carew
- The Man in the Iron Mask (1939) as Colbert
- Miracles for Sale (1939) as Colonel Watrous
- The Witness Vanishes (1939) as Amos Craven
- Dancing Co-Ed (1939) as President Cavendish
- The Secret of Dr. Kildare (1939) as Dr. 'Walter' Carew
- Adventure in Diamonds (1940) as Wakefield
- Star Dust (1940) as Napoleon in Screen Test
- Dr. Kildare's Strange Case (1940) as Dr. 'Walter' Carew, Hospital Administrator
- Lucky Partners (1940) as Wendell
- Dr. Kildare Goes Home (1940) as Dr. 'Walter' Carew
- A Dispatch from Reuter's (1940) as Napoleon III
- Dr. Kildare's Crisis (1940) as Dr. 'Walter' Carew
- Kitty Foyle (1940) as Mr. Kennett
- The Lone Wolf Takes a Chance (1941) as Dr. Hooper Tupman
- The Devil and Miss Jones (1941) as Mr. Allison
- The People vs. Dr. Kildare (1941) as Dr. 'Walter' Carew
- Hit the Road (1941) as Colonel Smith
- Ellery Queen and the Perfect Crime (1941) as Henry
- Dr. Kildare's Wedding Day (1941) as Dr. 'Walter' Carew
- The Corsican Brothers (1941) as Monsieur Dupre
- Unholy Partners (1941) as Mr. Peck - Managing Editor
- H. M. Pulham, Esq. (1941) as The Skipper (uncredited)
- Fly-by-Night (1942) as Heydt
- Dr. Kildare's Victory (1942) as Dr. 'Walter' Carew
- My Favorite Blonde (1942) as Dr. Wallace Faber
- Fingers at the Window (1942) as Dr. Cromwall
- Calling Dr. Gillespie (1942) as Dr. 'Walter' Carew
- The Loves of Edgar Allan Poe (1942) as T.W. White
- Dr. Gillespie's New Assistant (1942) as Dr. 'Walter' Carew
- Forever and a Day (1943) as Estate Lawyer
- Flight for Freedom (1943) as Admiral Graves
- Dr. Gillespie's Criminal Case (1943) as Dr. 'Walter' Carew
- Mr. Lucky (1943) as Commissioner Hargraves
- Don't You Believe It (1943, Short) as George Washington (uncredited)
- Bomber's Moon (1943) as Professor Frederich Mueller
- Hi Diddle Diddle (1943) as Senator Jummy Simpson
- The Hitler Gang (1944) as Franz von Papen
- Mr. Skeffington (1944) as Dr. Melton (uncredited)
- Three Men in White (1944) as Dr. Walter Carew
- Ghost Catchers (1944) as Chambers (uncredited)
- Secrets of Scotland Yard (1944) as Roylott Bevan
- Between Two Women (1945) as Dr. Walter Carew
- The Black Arrow (1948) as Sir Oliver Oates
- The Velvet Touch (1948) as Peter Gunther
- Slattery's Hurricane (1949) as R.J. Milne
- Experiment Alcatraz (1950) as Dr. J.P. Finley
- Kim (1950) as Dr. Bronson (uncredited)
- Tarzan's Peril (1951) as Barney
- Soldiers Three (1951) as Fairfax (uncredited)
- My Forbidden Past (1951) as Coroner
- Two-Dollar Bettor (1951) as Carleton P. Adams
- The Desert Fox: The Story of Rommel (1951) as Vice-Admiral Friedrich Ruge (uncredited)
- Confidence Girl (1952) as Mr. Markwell
- The Brigand (1952) as Sultan of Morocco
- The Pathfinder (1952) as Colonel Duncannon
- Loose in London (1953) as Earl of Walsingham
- Walking My Baby Back Home (1953) as Uncle Henry Hall
- Wonder Valley (1953) as Elderly Writer
- Casanova's Big Night (1954) as Minister (uncredited)
- Flight from Cathay (1954, TV Movie)
- Dynamite, the Story of Alfred Nobel (1954, TV Movie)
- Science Fiction Theater (1955) (Season 1 Episode 4: "Y-O-R-D-")
- Science Fiction Theater (1955) (Season 1 Episode 30: "Postcard from Barcelona")
- Science Fiction Theater (1956) (Season 2 Episode 1: "Signals From the Heart")
- Science Fiction Theater (1956) (Season 2 Episode 13: "End of Tomorrow")
- Science Fiction Theater (1956) (Season 2 Episode 36: "Gravity Zero")
- Alfred Hitchcock Presents (1956) (Season 1 Episode 24: "The Perfect Murder") as Dr. Poncet
- Alfred Hitchcock Presents (1956) (Season 1 Episode 35: "The Legacy") as Colonel Blair
- Alfred Hitchcock Presents (1956) (Season 2 Episode 10: "Jonathan") as Dr. Mack (credited but does not appear in episode)
- Alfred Hitchcock Presents (1956) (Season 2 Episode 14: "John Brown's Body") as Dr. Sam Helck
- The Search for Bridey Murphy (1956) as Professor
- Around the World in 80 Days (1956) as Captain of the 'Mongolia' (uncredited)
- Alfred Hitchcock Presents (1957) (Season 2 Episode 30: "The Three Dreams of Mr. Findlater") as Dr. Manley
- Merry Andrew (1958) as Mr. Fairchild (final film role)
