= Internes Can't Take Money =

1937 film by Alfred Santell

- Theatrical release poster
- Directed by: Alfred Santell
- Screenplay by: Rian James; Theodore Reeves
- Story by: Max Brand
- Produced by: Benjamin Glazer
- Starring: Barbara Stanwyck; Joel McCrea; Lloyd Nolan; Stanley Ridges
- Cinematography: Theodor Sparkuhl
- Edited by: Doane Harrison
- Music by: Gregory Stone
- Production company: Paramount Pictures
- Distributed by: Paramount Pictures
- Release date: April 16, 1937 (USA)
- Running time: 78 minutes
- Country: United States
- Language: English

Internes Can't Take Money is a 1937 American crime drama film directed by Alfred Santell and starring Barbara Stanwyck, Joel McCrea, Lloyd Nolan and Stanley Ridges. McCrea portrays Dr. Kildare in the character's first screen appearance. Metro-Goldwyn-Mayer continued the Dr. Kildare series with Young Dr. Kildare (1938) starring Lew Ayres as Kildare and Laraine Day as a nurse in love with Kildare. The film was released in the United Kingdom as You Can't Take Money.

== Plot ==
At New York's Mountview General Hospital, widow Janet Haley faints from exhaustion and malnutrition after intern Dr. Jimmie Kildare treats her for a burn from a pleating machine. Meanwhile, chief surgeon Dr. Henry J. Fearson fires intern Dr. Weeks for performing an experimental liver operation during which the patient died. Later at the bar where Jimmie is having a beer, Janet approaches gangster Dan Innes asking how she can find her 3-year-old daughter. The child was taken away by her husband when they separated. Innes demands $1,000 for the information, but poverty-stricken Janet is unable to pay. When gangster boss Hanlon collapses at the bar from a knife wound and the barman and Hanlon's men refuse to take him to the hospital, Jimmie performs an impromptu operation with Janet's help and saves Hanlon's life. The next morning, Janet goes to Innes' residence and he propositions her, but she refuses him. She then goes to work but discovers that she has been fired because of being two hours late.

Jimmie decides to visit Janet because she did not show up for her follow-up appointment. He takes an armload of food, stopping at the bar for a coule of bottles of beer before hitching a ride downtown with an ambulance. The bartender gives him $1,000 in cash from Hanlon for saving his life.

He tells Janet about the money—and that he must return it. She begs him to let her borrow it, but cannot bring herself to say why. Jimmie refuses: interns may not accept payment. As he explains that “it is the principle of the thing,” her eyes fill with tears. Janet tries to steal the money, but Jimmie catches her and, disillusioned, leaves. Janet is weeping when Innes arrives, claiming to have found her daughter.

Jimmie returns the money to Hanlon, Janet agrees to Innes' proposition and gives Jimmie an explanatory note. To repay Jimmie's favor, Hanlon deploys his huge organization all over the city and stops Innes and Janet before they leave town. Innes is shot, however, and Jimmie must perform the experimental liver operation, with the help of a fellow intern. The operation is successful but Innes refuses to talk until Hanlon and Jimmie frighten him into telling the truth.

At a convent, a nun brings several little girls down a long hall to where Janet and Jimmie are waiting. She recognizes one as her daughter and sweeps her into her arms.

== Cast ==
- Barbara Stanwyck as Janet Haley
- Joel McCrea as Dr. Jimmy Kildare
- Lloyd Nolan as Hanlon
- Stanley Ridges as Dan Innes
- Lee Bowman as intern Jim Weeks
- Barry Macollum as Stooly Martin
- Irving Bacon as Jeff McGuire
- Gaylord Pendleton as Intern Jones
- Pierre Watkin as Dr. Henry J. Fearson
- Charles Lane as Grote
- James Bush as Haines
- Fay Holden as Mother Teresa
- Ellen Drew as Nurse (uncredited)

== Reception ==
In a contemporary review for The New York Times, critic John T. McManus called the film "[a] nicely performed, well ordered and fairly rational reshuffle of the cinema verities (the chief of which are love, frustration, pathos, suspense, action and ambrosia)" and praised the lead actors: "Miss Stanwyck's work is pleasantly subdued, in contrast to the stormy time she has had in her last picture or so. Joel McCrea, as far as this reviewer is concerned, can do no wrong."
