= George H. Reed =

African American actor (1866–1952)

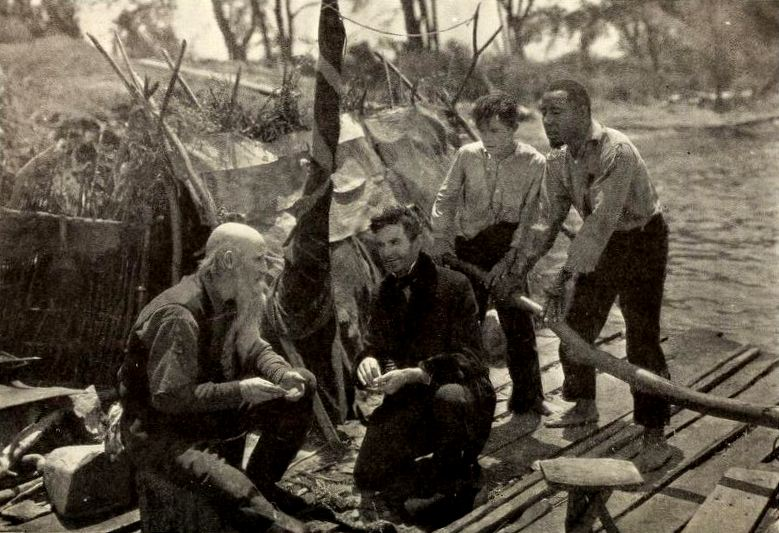
- Tom Bates, Orrall Humphrey, Lewis Sargent, and George H. Reed in Huckleberry Finn (1920)
- Born: George Henry Reed; November 27, 1866; Macon, Georgia, U.S.
- Died: November 6, 1952 (aged 85); Woodland Hills, Los Angeles, California, U.S.
- Occupation: Actor
- Years active: 1920–1952 (film career)
- Spouse: Julia Ridley

George Henry Reed (November 27, 1866 – November 6, 1952) was an African-American actor who worked in the Hollywood film industry in both the silent and sound eras. His first major film was the 1920 Huckleberry Finn where he played Jim. He is also remembered for the film The Green Pastures (1936), which featured an all–African American cast, and the orderly Conover in MGM's Dr. Kildare series.

== Selected filmography ==
- Huckleberry Finn (1920) - Jim (film debut)
- The Veiled Mystery (1920) - Tom
- One a Minute (1921) - J. Wellington Norcross - Townsman (uncredited)
- A Virginia Courtship (1921)
- The Jungle Goddess (1922) - Native guide
- The Bishop of the Ozarks (1923) - Simon
- Scars of Jealousy (1923) - Mose
- Red Lights (1923) - Porter
- Cameo Kirby (1923) - Croup (uncredited)
- The Vagabond Trail (1924) - George Romain
- Helen's Babies (1924) - Rastus - the coachman
- The Fast Worker (1924) - Train Porter (uncredited)
- The Isle of Hope (1925) - Cook
- Kentucky Pride (1925) - Trainer
- The Golden Strain (1925) - Butler
- Danger Quest (1926) - Umhatten
- The Johnstown Flood (1926) - Camp Cook (uncredited)
- Winning the Futurity (1926) - Uncle Mose
- Pals First (1926) - Uncle Alex
- The Rough Riders (1927) - Minor Role (uncredited)
- The Noose (1928) - Death Row Inmate (uncredited)
- The Clean-Up Man (1928) - Sambo
- The Big City (1928) - Black Waiter (uncredited)
- Three-Ring Marriage (1928) - Valet
- Absent (1928)
- River of Romance (1929) - Rumbo
- They Learned About Women (1930) - Train Porter (uncredited)
- Montana Moon (1930) - Train Porter (uncredited)
- The Divorcee (1930) - Second Porter (uncredited)
- Love in the Rough (1930) - Train Porter (uncredited)
- Reducing (1931) - Train Porter (uncredited)
- Trails of the Golden West (1931)
- Father's Son (1931) - Pullman Porter Johnson
- Sweepstakes (1931) - Cook's Helper (uncredited)
- Smart Money (1931) - George - a Porter (uncredited)
- Secret Service (1931) - Wagon Driver (uncredited)
- Reducing (1931) - Les, Wagon Driver
- The Gay Caballero (1932) - Train Porter (uncredited)
- Murder at Dawn (1932) - The Taxi Driver (uncredited)
- What Price Hollywood? (1932) - Minor Role (uncredited)
- Bachelor's Affairs (1932) - Men's Room Attendant (uncredited)
- The Golden West (1932) - Jasper the Coachman (uncredited)
- Bed of Roses (1933) - Alice - Dan's Shipboard Cook (uncredited)
- Hold Your Man (1933) - Reverend Crippen (uncredited)
- Life in the Raw (1933) - Porter (uncredited)
- The Last Trail (1933) - Japonica Jones
- The House on 56th Street (1933) - James - Lyndon's Butler (uncredited)
- Massacre (1934) - Chief Black Star (uncredited)
- Carolina (1934) - Minor Role (uncredited)
- A Modern Hero (1934) - Paul's Butler (uncredited)
- The Witching Hour (1934) - Train - Prentice's Butler (uncredited)
- Twentieth Century (1934) - Uncle Remus in Play (uncredited)
- Murder in Trinidad (1934) - Watchman on Telephone (uncredited)
- Judge Priest (1934) - Black Servant (uncredited)
- Belle of the Nineties (1934) - Brother Eben (uncredited)
- The Curtain Falls (1934) - Jim - Elevator Operator (uncredited)
- Mrs. Wiggs of the Cabbage Patch (1934) - Julius
- A Notorious Gentleman (1935) - Charles (uncredited)
- Wings in the Dark (1935) - Waring - Valet (uncredited)
- The Glass Key (1935) - Black Servant (uncredited)
- Lady Tubbs (1935) - Railroad Porter (uncredited)
- Don't Bet on Blondes (1935) - Marilyn's Butler (uncredited)
- Diamond Jim (1935) - Porter (uncredited)
- Red Salute (1935) - Butler (uncredited)
- The Virginia Judge (1935) - Rufus (uncredited)
- Shipmates Forever (1935) - Tom, Melville's Servant (uncredited)
- The Prisoner of Shark Island (1936) - Black Man Giving Booth Directions (uncredited)
- The Country Beyond (1936) - Porter (uncredited)
- Show Boat (1936) - Old Black Man (uncredited)
- The Green Pastures (1936) - Mr. Deshee
- Anthony Adverse (1936) - Crippled Black Man (uncredited)
- Oh, Susanna! (1936) - Fireman (uncredited)
- The Gorgeous Hussy (1936) - Braxton (uncredited)
- After the Thin Man (1936) - Dudley (uncredited)
- We Who Are About to Die (1937) - Black Convict (uncredited)
- Wings Over Honolulu (1937) - Fauntleroy (uncredited)
- The Go Getter (1937) - Butler for J. Browne #2 (uncredited)
- This Is My Affair (1937) - Watchman in Capitol (uncredited)
- Saratoga (1937) - Butler (uncredited)
- One Mile from Heaven (1937) - Peabody (uncredited)
- The Buccaneer (1938) - Nicodemus, a Servant
- City Girl (1938) - Elevator Operator (uncredited)
- One Wild Night (1938) - Waiter (uncredited)
- Josette (1938) - Butler
- The Toy Wife (1938) - Gabriel - Satoris' Servant (uncredited)
- Kentucky (1938) - Ben
- Going Places (1938) - Sam
- Calling Dr. Kildare (1939) - Black Man with Stomach Trouble (uncredited)
- The Secret of Dr. Kildare (1939) - Conover, Gillespie's Attendant
- Swanee River (1939) - Old Joe, McDowell's Coachman
- Dr. Kildare's Strange Case (1940) - Conover, Gillespie's Attendant
- Sporting Blood (1940) - Stonewall
- Maryland (1940) - Uncle Henry (uncredited)
- Manhattan Heartbeat (1940) - Porter
- Dr. Kildare Goes Home (1940) - Conover, Gillespie's Attendant
- Dr. Kildare's Crisis (1940) - Conover, Gillespie's Attendant
- The Great Lie (1941) - Greenfield's Butler (uncredited)
- The People vs. Dr. Kildare (1941) - Conover, Gillespie's Attendant
- Kiss the Boys Goodbye (1941) - George, House Servant
- Dr. Kildare's Wedding Day (1941) - Conover, Gillespie's Attendant
- Belle Starr (1941) - Old Jake (uncredited)
- They Died with Their Boots On (1941) - Charles (uncredited)
- Dr. Kildare's Victory (1942) - Conover, Gillespie's Attendant
- Reap the Wild Wind (1942) - Black Servant at Tea (uncredited)
- Mississippi Gambler (1942) - Roy
- Take a Letter, Darling (1942) - Sam French
- In This Our Life (1942) - Fitzroy's Butler (uncredited)
- Tales of Manhattan (1942) - Christopher (Robeson sequence)
- The Loves of Edgar Allan Poe (1942) - Mose (uncredited)
- Mrs. Wiggs of the Cabbage Patch (1942) - Butler in Olcott Home (uncredited)
- Dr. Gillespie's New Assistant (1942) - Conover, Gillespie's Attendant
- Dixie (1943) - Lucius (uncredited)
- Someone to Remember (1943) - John (uncredited)
- Is Everybody Happy? (1943) - Missouri
- His Butler's Sister (1943) - Train Conductor (uncredited)
- Chip Off the Old Block (1944) - Theodore (uncredited)
- The Adventures of Mark Twain (1944) - Comet-Watcher (uncredited)
- 3 Men in White (1944) - Conover, Gillespie's Attendant
- Home in Indiana (1944) - Tuppy (uncredited)
- Barbary Coast Gent (1944) - Josephus - Bellamy's Servant (uncredited)
- Heavenly Days (1944) - Bigbee's Servant (uncredited)
- Jungle Queen (1945, Serial) - Tonga (uncredited)
- Between Two Women (1945) - Conover, Gillespie's Attendant (uncredited)
- Strange Illusion (1945) - Benjamin
- Dangerous Partners (1945) - Porter (uncredited)
- Nob Hill (1945) - Black Man at El Dorado (uncredited)
- Pride of the Marines (1945) - Train Porter (uncredited)
- Saratoga Trunk (1945) - Carriage Driver, New Orleans (uncredited)
- Two Guys from Milwaukee (1946) - Clarence - the Porter (uncredited)
- The Sea of Grass (1947) - Uncle Nat (uncredited)
- The Michigan Kid (1947) - Steve's Servant (uncredited)
- The Homestretch (1947) - Dee Dee (uncredited)
- Dark Delusion (1947) - Conover, Gillespie's Attendant (final film role)
