= Young Dr. Kildare =

1938 film by Harold S. Bucquet

- Theatrical release poster
- Directed by: Harold S. Bucquet
- Written by: Max Brand (story); Harry Ruskin; Willis Goldbeck
- Produced by: Lou L. Ostrow (uncredited)
- Starring: Lionel Barrymore; Lew Ayres; Lynne Carver
- Cinematography: John F. Seitz
- Edited by: Elmo Veron
- Music by: David Snell
- Production company: Metro-Goldwyn-Mayer
- Distributed by: Loew's Inc.
- Release date: October 14, 1938
- Running time: 82 minutes
- Country: United States
- Language: English

Young Dr. Kildare is a 1938 American drama film directed by Harold S. Bucquet and starring Lew Ayres as Dr. James Kildare, an idealistic, freshly graduated medical intern, who benefits greatly from the wise counsel of his experienced mentor, Dr. Leonard Gillespie (played by Lionel Barrymore). The film was based on a story and characters created by author Frederick Schiller Faust, writing as Max Brand.

It is the second of a total of ten films featuring the "Dr. Kildare" character, but the first made by MGM, the first starring Ayres, and the first film appearance of the Dr. Gillespie character. The first Kildare film, Internes Can't Take Money (1937), was made by Paramount, featured Joel McCrea in the title role, and was based on an earlier Faust character and story that did not include the crusty Gillespie. After Internes Can't Take Money failed to meet Paramount's commercial expectations, MGM acquired the rights and worked with Faust to revise the character and storyline for greater viewer appeal, including the addition of Gillespie.

Young Doctor Kildare introduced the regulars working at Blair, including hospital administrator Dr. Carew (Walter Kingsford), nurses Molly Byrd (Alma Kruger) and Nosey Parker (Nell Craig), orderly Conover (George H. Reed), ambulance attendant Joe Wayman (Nat Pendleton), switchboard operator Sally (Marie Blake), and Mike Ryan (Frank Orth), proprietor of Sullivan's Hospital Cafe.

Following the success of Young Dr. Kildare, MGM went on to make a total of nine Kildare films, plus an additional six films centering on Gillespie after Kildare had been phased out.

== Plot ==
After graduating from medical school, Dr. James Kildare returns to his small home town, where his proud parents Stephen and Martha Kildare and childhood friend Alice Raymond expect him to join his father in his medical practice. However, he is more ambitious, though he is unsure what he wants to do. He has accepted a job as an intern at Blair General, a large New York City hospital.

He and the other new interns are being greeted by the hospital's administrator, Dr. Carew, when the famous diagnostician Dr. Leonard Gillespie bursts in and sizes up the newcomers. When Gillespie demands that the interns diagnose him on the spot, only Kildare takes up his challenge, prognosticating that he has a melanoma on his hand and a year to live. When Kildare hedges before Gillespie's gruff, Gillespie dismisses interest in him.

Later, Kildare is assigned ambulance duty with attendant Joe Wayman. His first call is a man who has passed out in a bar. Discarding the obvious conclusion of drunkenness, Kildare suspects the man has a serious medical problem. When Kildare has to respond to a second, more urgent call, he orders the skeptical Wayman to give the man oxygen all the way to the hospital. Wayman disregards his order and the man dies as a result. Kildare later takes the blame rather than have Wayman lose his job.

Kildare then attends to Barbara Chanler, a young suicide victim. Despite finding no signs of life, Kildare refuses to give up and finally succeeds in reviving her. Barbara Chanler turns out to be the sole child and heiress of extremely wealthy Robert Chanler. Highly respected psychiatrist Dr. Lane-Porteus diagnoses schizophrenia. Kildare, based on a short conversation he had with Barbara, is sure that she was driven to attempt suicide for more ordinary reasons. However, when Kildare refuses to divulge what she told him in the strictest confidence, Carew suspends him.

From a chance comment by Barbara's concerned fiance, Jack Hamilton, Kildare is able to piece the clues together. After quarreling with Hamilton, Barbara had gone to a nightclub alone, where she had started drinking heavily. A man took her upstairs to a private room, and that's all she remembered of the night. She was found by a policeman wandering the streets and taken home. Fear of what might have happened during her blackout made her try to take her own life.

When Kildare goes to Gillespie for advice, the older man broadly hints that he should ignore hospital rules. Kildare sneaks in to see Barbara to reassure her that nothing disgraceful happened. The man at the nightclub had recognized her and, fearful of what her rich father would do if he took advantage of her condition, he had simply dumped her on the street. Kildare then coaches Barbara on how to act so that Lane-Porteus does not have her confined to a mental institution.

Unaware of these developments, the hospital board fires Kildare for insubordination. He tells his parents and Alice, who have come to see him, that he is ready to become his father's partner. However, Gillespie has other ideas. All along, he had been testing Kildare. Now that he is sure of Kildare's integrity, competence and most of all courage of convictions, Gillespie hires the young man as his assistant, to pass along as much as possible before he dies of what Kildare had correctly diagnosed.

== Cast ==
- Lionel Barrymore as Dr. Leonard Gillespie
- Lew Ayres as Dr. James Kildare
- Lynne Carver as Alice Raymond
- Nat Pendleton as Joe Wayman
- Jo Ann Sayers as Barbara Chanler
- Samuel S. Hinds as Dr. Stephen Kildare
- Emma Dunn as Mrs. Martha Kildare
- Walter Kingsford as Dr. P. Walter Carew
- Truman Bradley as Jack Hamilton
- Monty Woolley as Dr. Lane-Porteus
- Pierre Watkin as Mr. Robert Chanler
- Nella Walker as Mrs. Chanler
- Roger Converse as Dr. Joiner

== See also ==
- Dr. Kildare (character)
- Lionel Barrymore filmography
