= Laraine Day =

American actress (1920–2007)

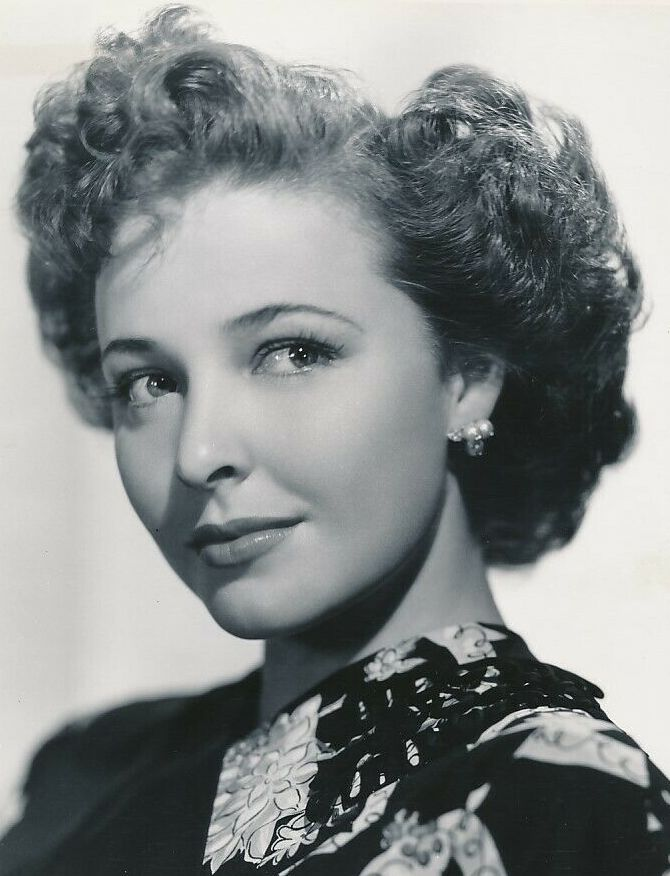
- Born: La Raine Johnson; October 13, 1920; Roosevelt, Utah, U.S.
- Died: November 10, 2007 (aged 87); Ivins, Utah, U.S.
- Resting place: Forest Lawn Memorial Park
- Other name: Laraine Johnson
- Occupation: Actress
- Years active: 1937–1986
- Political party: Republican
- Spouses: Ray Hendricks (m. 1942; div. 1947) Leo Durocher (m. 1948; div. 1960) Michael Grilikhes (m. 1961; died 2007)
- Children: 5
- Relatives: Alexandra Grilikhes (sister-in-law)

Laraine Day (born La Raine Johnson, October 13, 1920 – November 10, 2007) was an American actress, radio and television commentator, and former Metro-Goldwyn-Mayer (MGM) contract star. As a leading lady, she was paired opposite major film stars, including Robert Mitchum, Joel McCrea, Lana Turner, Cary Grant, Ronald Reagan, Kirk Douglas, and John Wayne. In addition to her numerous film and television roles, she acted on stage, conducted her own radio and television shows, and wrote two books. Because of her marriage to Leo Durocher and her involvement with his baseball career, she was known as the "First Lady of Baseball". Her best-known films include Foreign Correspondent; My Son, My Son; Journey for Margaret; Mr. Lucky; The Locket; and the Dr. Kildare series.

== Early life and education ==
Day was born in Roosevelt, Utah. She was one of eight children in a wealthy family who were members of the Church of Jesus Christ of Latter-day Saints (LDS Church). Her parents were Clarence Irwin Johnson and Ada M. (Rich) Johnson. Her father was a grain dealer and an interpreter for the Ute Indian tribes. She had a twin brother. Her great-grandfather was early Mormon pioneer Charles C. Rich. The family later moved to California, where she began her acting career with the Long Beach Players, including her friend and contemporary Robert Mitchum. She attended George Washington Junior High School and was a 1938 graduate of Polytechnic High School in Long Beach, California.

== Career ==
Day in a 1951 advertisement for Motorola televisions

After a talent scout spotted her with the Long Beach Players, she signed a contract with Goldwyn studios, for which she made her cinematic debut. In 1937, Day debuted on screen in a bit part in Stella Dallas. Her contract was dropped shortly thereafter because she "lacked talent". Shortly afterwards, she won lead roles at RKO Pictures in several George O'Brien Westerns, in which she was billed as Laraine Johnson. In 1938, she adopted the name "Laraine Day" to honor her previous playhouse manager, Elias Day, from whom she had received much of her training. During that time, she was active in establishing a playhouse in Los Angeles for Mormon actors. Ray Bradbury joined for a period of time in 1939, and she let him do some stage prop work and publicity.

In 1939, she signed with MGM, and became popular and well known (billed as Laraine Day) as Nurse Mary Lamont, the title character's love interest and eventual fiancée in a string of seven Dr. Kildare movies beginning with Calling Dr. Kildare (1939), with Lew Ayres in the title role.

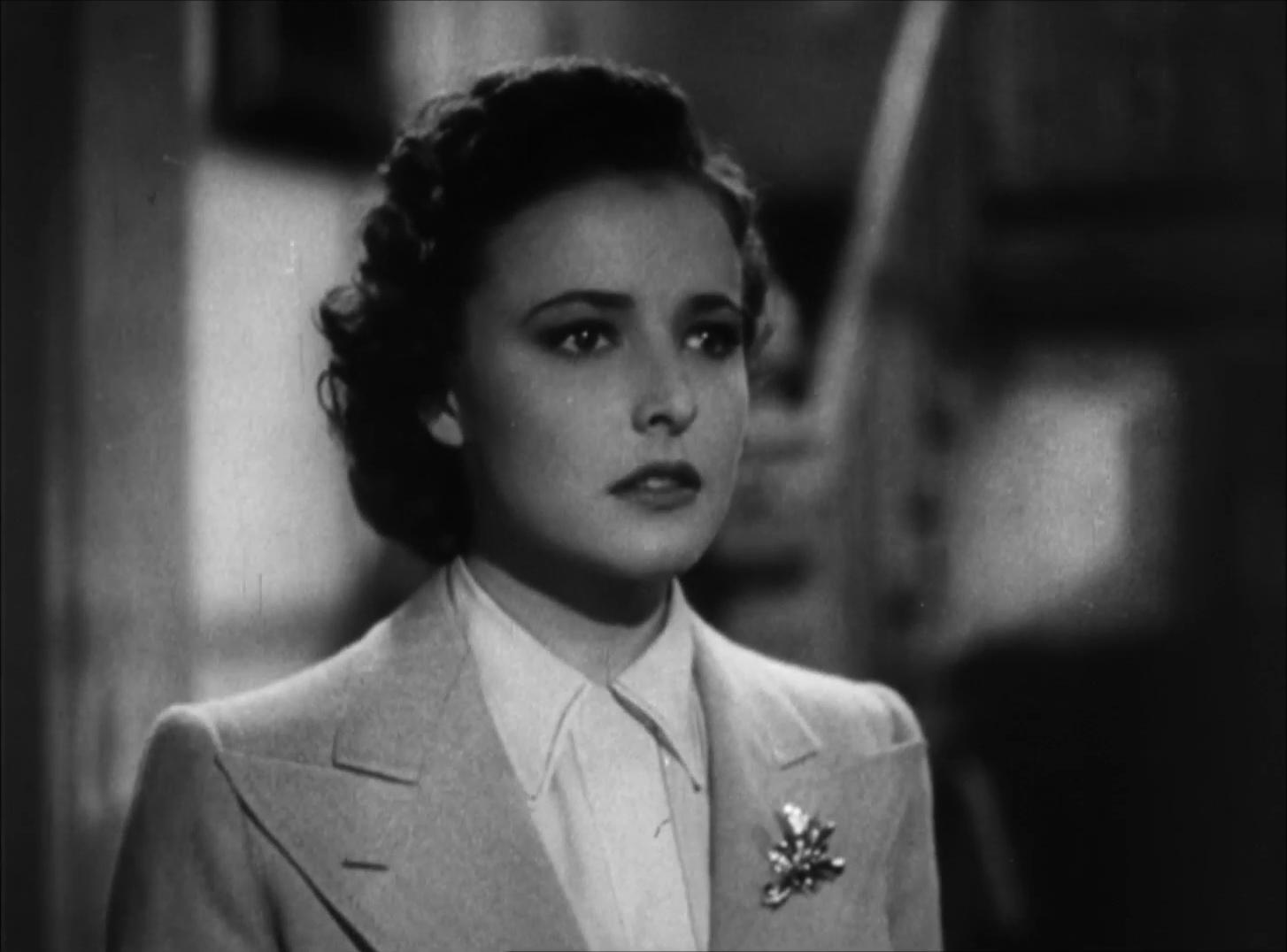
In Foreign Correspondent (1940)

Her roles for other studios were often far more stimulating than those MGM gave her, including a prominent supporting part in the Irish melodrama My Son, My Son! (1940). She also starred in the Alfred Hitchcock thriller Foreign Correspondent (1940) with Joel McCrea and the psychological mystery The Locket (1946) with Robert Mitchum, Brian Aherne, and Gene Raymond. In 1941, she was voted the number one "star of tomorrow" in Hollywood. Also in 1941, she was Ronald Reagan's leading lady in the Western comedy The Bad Man, starring top-billed Wallace Beery and Lionel Barrymore. That same year, she made her stage debut opposite Gregory Peck in the national theater tour of Angel Street. She was released from her contract with MGM of her own discretion in May 1946 and signed a contract with RKO in December of that year. The contract stated that she would make one film a year for five years, earning $100,000 per film. Throughout her film career, she was paired opposite major film stars, including Lana Turner, Cary Grant, and John Wayne. In the 1940s, she made guest appearances on radio on both Lux Radio Theatre and The Screen Guild Theater.

In May 1951, she began hosting a television show alternately called Daydreaming with Laraine and The Laraine Day Show. In May 1952, she was signed to a midnight-to-3 a.m. interview series with New York radio station WMGM featuring interviews related to politics, show business, and sports. She also made stage appearances in Lost Horizon, the 1973 revival of The Women, and a revival of The Time of the Cuckoo.

== Personal life ==
Day married her first husband, James Ray Hendricks, on May 16, 1942. He was a dance-band singer who became an airport executive for the Santa Monica airport. The couple adopted three children. Day filed for divorce from Hendricks in December 1946. Day was granted an interlocutory divorce from Hendricks on January 20, 1947, which required her to wait one year before remarrying.

On January 21, 1947, Day traveled to Ciudad Juárez, Mexico, where she received a second divorce decree. Later that day, she traveled to El Paso, Texas, where she married baseball manager Leo Durocher. Upon returning to California, the judge who granted Day's interlocutory divorce from Hendricks stated that the Mexican divorce she received was not legal and, since she failed to wait the one-year period for her divorce to become final, deemed her Texas marriage illegal. After waiting a little over a year, Day and Durocher re-married on February 16, 1948, in Santa Monica, California.

After the couple moved to New York, Day read every book about baseball she could to understand the game. She became the first woman to be honored by the New York chapter of the Baseball Writers Association at their annual dinner in 1951. During her marriage to Durocher, Day was often referred to as the "First Lady of Baseball". While Durocher was managing the New York Giants, she wrote the book Day with the Giants (1952). This book is considered a rare book as of 2026. She was also the hostess of Day with the Giants, a 15-minute television interview program broadcast before New York Giants home games. Day and Durocher divorced in June 1960. She attended the Baseball Hall of Fame induction for Durocher when he was inducted posthumously in 1994.

On March 7, 1961, Day married television producer Michael Grilikhes, with whom she had two daughters.

=== Religion ===
Day was a member of the LDS Church. Throughout her life, she never swore, smoked, or drank any kind of alcohol, coffee, or tea. Until her death in 2007, she retained her Mormon faith, stating, "It brings me comfort in a confusing world." In 1961, she appeared with the Mormon Tabernacle Choir in their production of Let Freedom Ring, which was an inspirational one-hour program dedicated to the spirit of American Freedom. She was heavily involved within the Los Angeles California Temple, Westwood 1st Ward, and the Hollywood California Stake.

=== Politics ===
Day was, as she described herself, "very much a Republican". In October 1960, Day appeared in the Nixon–Lodge Bumper Sticker Motorcade Campaign in Los Angeles along with Ginger Rogers, Cesar Romero, Irene Dunne, Dick Powell, Mary Pickford, and John Payne. Day was a prominent member of the Motion Picture Alliance for the Preservation of American Ideals. Throughout her career, Day maintained close personal friendships with a prominent network of fellow Hollywood conservatives, including Ronald and Nancy Reagan, Marie Windsor, Yvonne De Carlo, James Stewart, Robert Mitchum, Dean Jagger, John Wayne, Joel McCrea, Frances Dee, Joan Caulfield, Virginia Mayo, Coleen Gray, Audrey Totter, Gloria DeHaven, June Allyson, Shirley Temple, Cesar Romero, Donna Reed, John Payne, Rhonda Fleming, Cyd Charisse, Tony Martin, Audrey Meadows, Jayne Meadows, Anne Jeffreys, Robert Sterling, Ward Bond, and Dean Jagger.

She supported the campaign of Barry Goldwater in 1964. She was a vocal supporter of Richard Nixon, whom she later met at the 1968 Republican National Convention, citing him as the type who would "go out of his way to help the American people". She also supported Dwight D. Eisenhower in 1952 and longtime Hollywood friend and former co-star Ronald Reagan in the 1980 and 1984 presidential elections, saying of both Nancy Reagan and him, "Ronald Reagan makes me proud to be an American. His intelligence, capability, and Christian brotherhood are so inspiring and his way of leadership is just superb. I consider myself lucky to have been his leading lady in The Bad Man and a short-subject reel and as a nation all together we are beyond fortunate to have the leadership of such fine people as the Reagans."

== Later years and death ==
In the 1970s, she was the spokeswoman for the Make America Better campaign and traveled across the country sharing her views on environmental issues. In 1971, she wrote a book called The America We Love. Day moved back to her native Utah in March 2007 following the death of her third husband. She died at the home of her daughter, Gigi Bell, in Ivins, Utah, from undisclosed causes on November 10, 2007. She was 87 years old. Her body was taken back to California, and on November 15, 2007, a memorial service was held at Forest Lawn Memorial Park in the Hollywood Hills.

== Legacy ==
During World War II, the Royal Canadian Air Force 427 Lion Squadron had been "adopted" by MGM. Many of the aircraft had dedications or nose art honoring MGM's Stars. A Handley-Page Halifax bomber "Yehudi" DK226 ZL Y carried the name of Laraine Day into battle over Germany. For her contribution to the motion picture industry, Day has a star on the Hollywood Walk of Fame at 6676 Hollywood Blvd.

She was portrayed by Jud Tylor in 42 (2013).

== Filmography ==
Some film and television appearances come from Turner Classic Movies.

Film
Year	Title	Role	Notes
1937	Stella Dallas	Girl at Resort and on Train	Uncredited
1938	Scandal Street	Peg Smith	Credited as Laraine Johnson
1938	Border G-Man	Betty Holden	Credited as Laraine Johnson
1938	Painted Desert	Miss Carol Banning	Credited as Laraine Johnson
1939	Arizona Legion	Letty Meade	Credited as Laraine Johnson
1939	Sergeant Madden	Eileen Daly	
1939	Calling Dr. Kildare	Mary Lamont	
1939	Tarzan Finds a Son!	Mrs. Richard Lancing	
1939	Think First	Marjorie (Margie) Smith	Short
1939	The Secret of Dr. Kildare	Nurse Mary Lamont	
1940	I Take This Woman	Linda Rodgers	
1940	My Son, My Son!	Maeve O'Riorden	
1940	And One Was Beautiful	Kate Lattimer	
1940	Dr. Kildare's Strange Case	Nurse Mary Lamont	
1940	Foreign Correspondent	Carol Fisher	
1940	Dr. Kildare Goes Home	Mary Lamont	
1940	Dr. Kildare's Crisis	Mary Lamont	
1941	The Trial of Mary Dugan	Mary Dugan	
1941	The Bad Man	Lucia Pell	
1941	The People vs. Dr. Kildare	Nurse Mary Lamont	
1941	Dr. Kildare's Wedding Day	Mary Lamont	
1941	Unholy Partners	Miss 'Croney' Cronin	
1941	Kathleen	Dr. Angela Martha "Angel" Kent	
1942	A Yank on the Burma Road	Mrs. Gail Farwood	
1942	Fingers at the Window	Edwina Brown	
1942	Mister Gardenia Jones	Joanne	Short
1942	Journey for Margaret	Nora Davis	
1943	Mr. Lucky	Dorothy Bryant	
1944	The Story of Dr. Wassell	Madeleine	
1944	Bride by Mistake	Norah Hunter	
1945	Keep Your Powder Dry	Leigh Rand	
1945	Those Endearing Young Charms	Helen Brandt	
1946	The Locket	Nancy	
1947	Tycoon	Maura	
1948	My Dear Secretary	Stephanie "Steve" Gaylord	
1949	The Woman on Pier 13	Nan Lowry Collins	Preview and prerelease title: I Married a Communist
1949	Without Honor	Jane Bandle	Working titles Twilight and Deep End; reissued in the 1950s as Woman Accused
1954	The High and the Mighty	Lydia Rice	
1956	The Toy Tiger	Gwendolyn "Gwen" Taylor	
1956	Three for Jamie Dawn	Sue Lorenz	
1960	The 3rd Voice	Marian Forbes	

Television
Year	Title	Role	Notes
1951	The Nash Airflyte Theater		Episode: "The Crisis"
1951	Daydreaming with Laraine	Host	
1951–1957	Lux Video Theatre	Various roles	7 episodes
1952–1957	The Ford Television Theatre	Various roles	7 episodes
1953	Double Play	Co-host	
1953	Willys Theatre Presenting Ben Hecht's Tales of the City		Episode #1.2
1953	General Electric Theater		Episode: "Hired Mother"
1955	Screen Directors Playhouse	Joyce Carter	Episode: "The Final Tribute"
1955	What's My Line	Herself / Celebrity Panelist	2 episodes
1955–1957	The Loretta Young Show	Various roles	3 episodes
1956	Celebrity Playhouse		Segment: " Tomorrow We May Part"
1956	Hollywood Summer Theater		
1956–1959	Playhouse 90	Various roles	2 episodes
1957	Climax!	Ellen Parker	Episode: "Walk a Tightrope"
1957	Schlitz Playhouse of Stars	Mrs. Lorenz	Episode: "Bitter Parting"
1958	Pursuit	Kathy Nelson	Episode: "Tiger on a Bicycle"
1958	Swiss Family Robinson	Mother	Television film
1958	Rendezvous		Episode: "Alone"
1960	Moment of Fear		Episode: "Cage of Air"
1961	Checkmate	Woman	Episode: "To the Best of My Recollection"
1962	Follow the Sun	Aunt Charlotte	Episode: " Not Aunt Charlotte!"
1962	The New Breed	Vivian Cowley	Episode: "A Motive Named Walter"
1963	The Alfred Hitchcock Hour	Ruth	Season 1 Episode 27: "Death and the Joyful Woman"
1963	Burke's Law	Lisa Cole	Episode: "Who Killed Billy Jo?"
1963	Wagon Train	Cassie Vance	Episode: "The Cassie Vance Story"
1965	Will Banner		Television film
1967	The World: Color It Happy		Television film
1968	The Name of the Game	Grace Jellicoe	Episode: "The Taker"
1969	The F.B.I.	Helen York	Episode: "Gamble with Death"
1972	The Sixth Sense	Marion Ford	Episode: "The Heart That Wouldn't Stay Buried"
1973	Medical Center	Arelene Gillette	Episode: "Broken Image"
1975	Murder on Flight 502	Claire Garwood	Television film
1978	The Love Boat	Vera Simpson	2 episodes
1978–1979	Fantasy Island	Various roles	2 episodes
1979	Lou Grant	Laura Sinclair	Episode: "Hollywood"
1985	Airwolf	Amelia Davenport	Episode: "Eruption"
1985	Hotel	Mrs. Kupchak	Episode: "Second Offense"
1986	Murder, She Wrote	Constance Fletcher	2 episodes, (final appearance)
