= The Idle Rich (1929 film) =

1929 film by William C. deMille

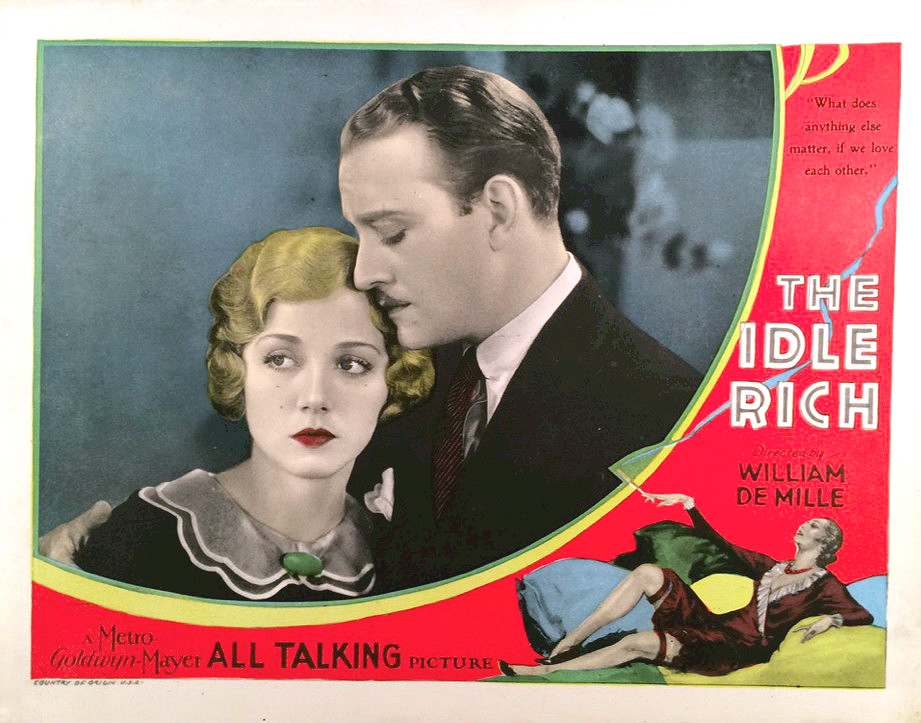
- Lobby card
- Directed by: William C. deMille
- Written by: Clara Beranger (scenario); Robert E. "Hoppy" Hopkins (uncredited)
- Based on: White Collars: a Comedy in Three Acts (1923 play) by Edith Ellis
- Produced by: Louis B. Mayer; Irving Thalberg
- Starring: Conrad Nagel; Bessie Love; Leila Hyams
- Cinematography: Leonard Smith
- Edited by: Conrad A. Nervig
- Distributed by: Metro-Goldwyn-Mayer
- Release date: June 15, 1929 (U.S.)
- Running time: 80 minutes
- Country: United States
- Language: English

The Idle Rich is a 1929 American pre-Code comedy film directed by William C. deMille and produced and released by Metro Goldwyn Mayer. It is based on the Broadway play White Collars by Edith Ellis, which had played at the Egan Theater in Los Angeles in 1924 before moving to the Cort Theatre in New York.

The film is extant, and was released on DVD in 2012 from Warner Archive Collection.

This film was remade in 1938 as Rich Man, Poor Girl with Robert Young and Ruth Hussey.

== Plot ==
The Idle Rich (1929)

Wealthy businessman William "Will" Van Luyn proposes to his secretary, Joan Thayer. She accepts, but worries how her family will react. When he meets them for the first time, little sister Helen is delighted by the advantages he will bring, but cousin Henry starts lecturing him on the virtues of the downtrodden middle class. The rich can afford medical treatment, and the poor can rely on the government to pay the bills, but the middle class has to shoulder the financial burden on its own. Nevertheless, Will marries Joan.

A month later, their honeymoon is interrupted when he has to return to the city to deal with a lawsuit. Joan insists that they stay in her family's apartment for a few weeks. Her father turns down Will's offer to buy them a luxurious twelve-room apartment in a much better neighborhood, and the rest of the family supports his decision. Will gamely goes along with Joan's plan but insists that her bedroom is too small for the two of them and sleeps on the living room couch. This does not contribute to the couple's marital bliss; he has insisted that she quit working, so she does not see much of him either during the day or at night.

Will's good intentions only cause trouble. He secretly arranges for Henry to be offered a good job in South America, but Henry discovers his role in it and turns down the opportunity. When Will gives Helen expensive jewelry as a belated birthday present, her fiancé, truck driver Tom Gibney, is furious. He picks a fight, but Will easily knocks him down with a couple of punches.

To teach his in-laws a lesson, Will announces that he is going to become one of them by giving away his fortune to charity. Joan's father has just lost his job, and the entire family admits they have been wrong and tries to talk Will out of it. Finally, he reveals it was all a ploy to make them realize his wealth is not something to be ashamed of. They no longer object when he showers them with gifts.

== Cast ==
- Conrad Nagel as William van Luyn
- Bessie Love as Helen Thayer
- Leila Hyams as Joan Thayer
- Robert Ober as Henry Thayer
- James Neill as Mr. Thayer
- Edythe Chapman as Mrs. Thayer
- Paul Kruger as Tom Gibney
- Kenneth Gibson as Frank Thayer, Helen's brother

== Reception ==
The film received negative reviews.

== See also ==
- List of early sound feature films (1926–1929)
