= Alexandra Grilikhes =

American writer

- Born: December 1, 1932; New York, New York, U.S.
- Died: February 8, 2003 (age 70); Roxborough, Pennsylvania, U.S.
- Other name: Sandra Grilikhes
- Occupations: Writer, poet, novelist
- Relatives: Laraine Day (sister-in-law)

Alexandra Barbara Grilikhes (December 1, 1932 – February 8, 2003) was an American writer, librarian, critic, novelist, and poet based in Philadelphia.

== Early life and education ==
Grilikhes was born in New York City, the daughter of Anatol Israel Grilikhes and Blanche Krainin Grilikhes. Her parents were both born in Russia; her father was an engraver and artist and her mother was a bookkeeper, violinist and poet. She graduated from Queens College, then earned a master's degree in library science at Columbia University.

== Career ==
Grilikhes taught poetry at the University of the Arts in Philadelphia, and was a librarian at the Annenberg School for Communication at the University of Pennsylvania. In the 1970s and 1980s, she produced the International Festival of Films by Women, hosted public radio programs, and was poetry editor for the weekly Philadelphia City Paper. She spoke at the American Dance Guild conference in 1989. She was editor and publisher of the literary magazine American Writing, from 1990 to 2002. Her 2001 novel Yin Fire was a finalist for a Lambda Literary Award. She also wrote spoken-word scores for dance performances, and gave readings with the Improvisational Poetry Group.

== Publications ==
Grilikhes's poetry often focused on women artists, mythologies, and female deities. Her work was published in College Art Journal, The American Scholar, Feminist Studies, Grand Street, The Women's Review of Books, and Bridges, and collected in several books and anthologies.

- "Three poems: Melancholia, Bronze Aquamanile, The Twelvetones of Plainchant" (1960, poems)
- "Antonioni" (1971, poem)
- "On March 23, John Ashbery (Reading His Poems)" (1972, poem)
- Isabel Rawsthorne Standing in a Street in Soho, and Other Poems (1972)
- Body/With Words: Poems for Dance (1976)
- Sea Agon (1976)
- City Poems (1977)
- "Watching the Dance" (1978, poem)
- On Women Artists: Poems, 1975-1980 (1981)
- "Key" and "The Answers" (1982, poems)
- "Something to Say" (1985, poem)
- The Blue Scar and other poems (1988)
- "Traveling", "Story", and "Close the Door" (1993, poems)
- Shaman Body (1996, book of poetry)
- "Mangled" (1998, poem)
- "Inanna in Winter" and "Roy's Mother" (1999, poems)
- Yin Fire (2001, novel)

== Personal life ==
Grilikhes died in 2003, at age 70, from breast cancer, in Roxborough, Pennsylvania. She was survived by Elizabeth Weiss, her partner of twenty years. Her brother Michel Grilikhes was a noted television and event producer, married to actress Laraine Day. Grilikhes was Jewish and a parishioner of Congregation Mishkan Shalom.
