= Iron Man (1931 film) =

1931 film

- Theatrical release poster
- Directed by: Tod Browning
- Screenplay by: Francis Edward Faragoh
- Based on: Iron Man; 1930 novel by W.R. Burnett
- Produced by: E. M. Asher; Tod Browning; Carl Laemmle Jr.
- Starring: Lew Ayres; Robert Armstrong; Jean Harlow
- Cinematography: Percy Hilburn
- Edited by: Milton Carruth; Maurice Pivar (supervising editor)
- Production company: Universal Pictures
- Distributed by: Universal Pictures
- Release date: April 30, 1931
- Running time: 73 minutes
- Country: United States
- Language: English

Iron Man is a 1931 American pre-Code sports drama film directed by Tod Browning and starring Lew Ayres and Jean Harlow. In 1951, Universal remade the film with Jeff Chandler, Evelyn Keyes and Rock Hudson, directed by Joseph Pevney. A prizefighter is abandoned by his wife due to his failing career. Following his first winning streak, his wife returns to him, but fools her husband into hiring her lover as his new boxing manager, despite his lack of experience.

== Plot ==
After lightweight prizefighter Kid Mason loses his opening fight, golddigging wife Rose leaves him for Hollywood. Without her around, Mason trains seriously and starts winning. Naturally, Rose returns and worms her way back into his life, despite the misgivings of manager George Regan. Eventually, she cons Mason into dumping Regan and replacing him with her secret lover Lewis, even though he has almost no experience in the fight game. To make matters worse, Mason's high living and neglect of his training threatens his latest title defense.

== Cast ==
- Lew Ayres as Kid Mason
- Robert Armstrong as George Regan
- Jean Harlow as Rose Mason
- John Miljan as Paul H. Lewis
- Edward Dillon as Jeff
- Mike Donlin as McNeil
- Morrie Cohan as Rattler O'Keefe
- Mary Doran as Showgirl
- Mildred Van Dorn as Gladys DeVere
- Ned Sparks as Riley
- Sammy Blum as Mandel

== See also ==
- List of boxing films

== Bibliography ==
- Grindon, Leger (2006). "Tod Browning's Thematic Continuity and Stylistic Development in Iron Man". In Herzogenrath, Bernd (ed.). The Films of Tod Browning. Black Dog Publications. ISBN 978-1-904772-51-4.
