= The People vs. Dr. Kildare =

1941 film by Harold S. Bucquet

- Directed by: Harold S. Bucquet
- Written by: Lawrence P. Bachmann; Max Brand
- Screenplay by: Willis Goldbeck; Harry Ruskin
- Starring: Lew Ayres; Lionel Barrymore; Bonita Granville; Laraine Day
- Cinematography: Clyde De Vinna
- Edited by: Ralph E. Winters
- Music by: David Snell
- Production company: Metro-Goldwyn-Mayer
- Distributed by: Loew's Inc.
- Release date: May 2, 1941
- Running time: 78 minutes
- Country: United States
- Language: English

The People vs. Dr. Kildare is a 1941 American drama film directed by Harold S. Bucquet and starring Lew Ayres, Lionel Barrymore, Bonita Granville, and Laraine Day. It was part of the series of Doctor Kildare films produced by Metro-Goldwyn-Mayer. Kildare performs an emergency operation on a crash victim.

== Plot ==
Ice skater Frances Marlowe, who has just signed a lucrative contract with an ice show, is driving with her manager, Dan Morton, when her car is struck by a truck. Dr. James Kildare and his fiancée, nurse Mary Lamont, see the accident and help the victims, who are only slightly hurt, except for Frances, who has a compound fracture of the leg and a ruptured spleen. Because Kildare is certain that Frances will die from internal bleeding if he does not operate immediately, he performs surgery before the ambulance arrives. Back at New York's Blair General Hospital, Kildare gives her a transfusion under the watchful eye of his diagnostician mentor, crusty Dr. Leonard Gillespie.

Morton arrives with an insurance investigator and overhears orderly Vernon Briggs joke about a half-empty whiskey bottle being found in the car Kildare borrowed from Molly Byrd, superintendent of nurses. Weeks later, when the cast is removed from Frances' leg, she is unable to move it. In hysterics she blames the paralysis on Kildare. Gillespie and Kildare have no idea what is causing the paralysis and are shocked when Frances sues Kildare and the hospital for malpractice. Kildare must face trial and Gillespie fears that a jury of laymen will side with the patient. Hospital administrator Dr. Carew wants to settle the case out of court, but Kildare insists on going through with it to protect his standing as a doctor.

During the trial, Frances' aggressive attorney establishes that the liquor bottle was found in the car to imply that Kildare had been drinking. Further testimony makes the case seem hopeless until Vernon, who first saw the bottle, suggests during a recess where it might have come from. Kildare goes to see the driver of the truck, who admits that he hid the bottle in Kildare's car because he did not want to be accused of driving drunk, but says that Frances could have prevented the collision but seemed "paralyzed."

Kildare theorizes that Frances might have spina bifida occulta, a congenital condition which may have flared up after several falls on the ice just prior to the accident. Frances agrees to an examination that confirms the diagnosis but her attorney urges her to postpone any operation to prove or disprove it as the cause of her paralysis until after she wins the case. Gillespie's testimony that doctors can avoid malpractice suits by doing nothing and allowing victims to die, and his impassioned plea that they have freedom to attend a patient in an emergency results in the jury's request to render a verdict only if an operation is performed and the results known. Frances agrees and when her recovery is complete, joyfully looks forward to resuming her career.

== Cast ==
- Lew Ayres as Dr. James Kildare
- Lionel Barrymore as Dr. Leonard Gillespie
- Laraine Day as Nurse Mary Lamont
- Bonita Granville as Frances Marlowe
- Alma Kruger as Molly Byrd
- Red Skelton as Vernon Briggs
- Paul Stanton as Mr. Reynolds
- Diana Lewis as Fay Lennox
- Walter Kingsford as Dr. Walter Carew
- Nell Craig as Nurse Parker
- Tom Conway as Mr. Channing
- Marie Blake as Sally
- Eddie Acuff as Clifford Genet
- George H. Reed as Conover
- Chick Chandler as Dan Morton
