= Rich Man, Poor Girl =

1938 film by Reinhold Schünzel

- Directed by: Reinhold Schünzel
- Written by: Edgar Franklin
- Screenplay by: Joseph Fields; Jerome Chodorov
- Based on: White Collars; 1925 play by Edith Ellis
- Produced by: Edward Chodorov
- Starring: Robert Young; Lew Ayres; Ruth Hussey
- Cinematography: Ray June
- Edited by: Frank E. Hull
- Music by: William Axt
- Production company: Metro-Goldwyn-Mayer
- Distributed by: Loew's Inc.
- Release date: August 12, 1938
- Running time: 72 minutes
- Country: United States
- Language: English
- Budget: $240,000
- Box office: $498,000

Rich Man, Poor Girl is a 1938 American comedy film directed by Reinhold Schünzel and starring Robert Young, Ruth Hussey and Lew Ayres. The film is a remake of the 1929 film The Idle Rich. This was Lana Turner's second appearance as an MGM star.

== Plot ==
The wealthy young businessman Bill Harrison moves in with secretary girlfriend Joan Thayer's eccentric family to convince her they can make their marriage work.

== Cast ==
- Robert Young as Bill Harrison
- Lew Ayres as Henry Thayer
- Ruth Hussey as Joan Thayer
- Lana Turner as Helen
- Rita Johnson as Sally Harrison
- Don Castle as Frank
- Guy Kibbee as Pa
- Sarah Padden as Ma
- Gordon Jones as Tom Grogan
- Virginia Grey as Miss Selma Willis
- Marie Blake as Mrs. Gussler

== Box office ==
According to MGM records the film earned $340,000 in the US and Canada and $158,000 elsewhere resulting in a profit of $240,000.
