= Young Dr. Kildare (TV series) =

- Genre: Medical drama
- Starring: Mark Jenkins; Gary Merrill; Marsha Mason
- Country of origin: United States
- No. of seasons: 1
- No. of episodes: 24

Production
- Running time: 60 minutes
- Production companies: Arena Productions; Metro-Goldwyn-Mayer Television

Original release
- Network: Syndication
- Release: September 21, 1972 – 1973

Young Dr. Kildare is a syndicated medical drama television series which originally ran from September 21, 1972, for a total of 24 episodes. It was a remake of the Richard Chamberlain series Dr. Kildare which in turn was based on fictional doctor characters originally created by author Max Brand in the 1930s and previously used by MGM in a popular film series and radio drama.

== Plot ==
The series centers on young intern Dr. James Kildare (Mark Jenkins) working at the fictional large metropolitan "Blair General Hospital" and trying to learn his profession, deal with patients' problems, and win the respect of the senior Dr. Leonard Gillespie (Gary Merrill).

== Cast ==
=== Main cast ===
- Mark Jenkins as Dr. James Kildare
- Gary Merrill as Dr. Leonard Gillespie
- Marsha Mason as Nurse Lord
- Simon Oakland as Attorney

=== Guest cast ===
Guest cast includes: Don Johnson, Cass Elliot, William Devane, Pamelyn Ferdin, Pamela Payton-Wright, Jess Walton, Marcia Rodd, and Claiborne Cary

== Episodes ==
The 24 episodes in the series are:

1. The Night of the Intern
2. The Stranger
3. The Exile
4. I'm Handling It
5. The Unfinished Child
6. The Thing with Feathers
7. The Cage
8. The Riot
9. The Don
10. The House Call
11. By This Sign
12. No More than a Bad Cold
13. Deaf Heart
14. Chemistry of Anger
15. Charlotte Wade Makes Lots of Shade
16. Death of Innocents
17. A Perfectly Healthy Boy
18. The Legacy
19. The Three of Us
20. The Million Dollar Property
21. The Man Is a Rock
22. The Accident
23. The Nature of the Beast
24. A Good Death
