= Dr. Kildare's Wedding Day =

1941 film by Harold S. Bucquet

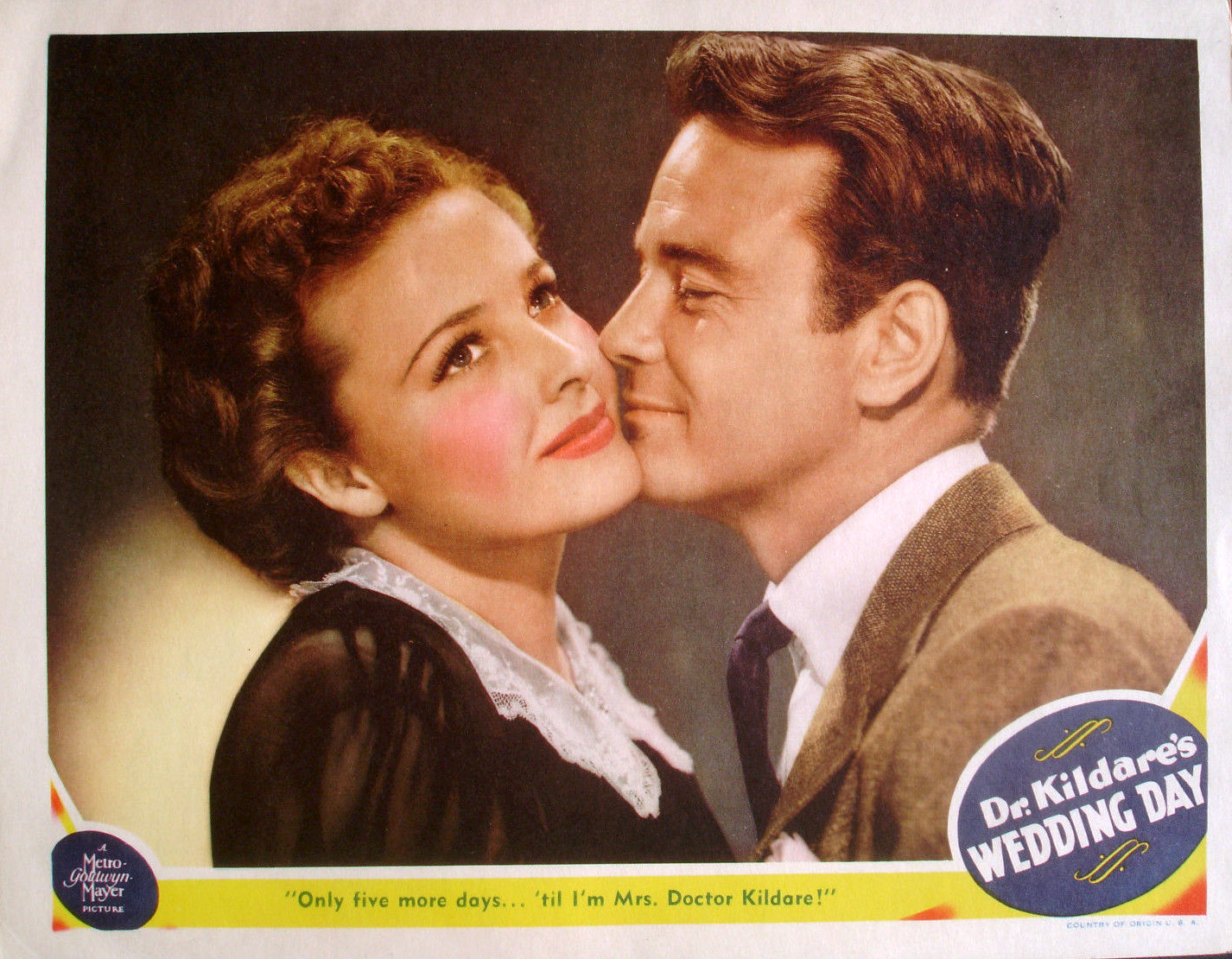
- Lobby card
- Directed by: Harold S. Bucquet
- Written by: Max Brand; Ormond Ruthven; Lawrence P. Bachmann
- Screenplay by: Willis Goldbeck; Harry Ruskin
- Starring: Lew Ayres; Lionel Barrymore; Laraine Day
- Cinematography: George J. Folsey
- Edited by: Conrad A. Nervig
- Music by: Bronislau Kaper; Lionel Barrymore
- Production company: Metro-Goldwyn-Mayer
- Distributed by: Loew's Inc.
- Release date: August 22, 1941
- Running time: 83 minutes
- Country: United States
- Language: English

Dr. Kildare's Wedding Day is a 1941 American drama film directed by Harold S. Bucquet and starring Lew Ayres, Lionel Barrymore, and Laraine Day. It is the eighth of a total of nine Dr. Kildare pictures made by Metro-Goldwyn-Mayer. When MGM decided to move up-and-coming star Laraine Day out of the Dr. Kildare series, the studio did so in a startlingly dramatic fashion. Adding extra interest to this film in the Kildare series, Barrymore composed the music credited to the Cornelia Bartlett character, and actor Red Skelton provides comic relief.

== Plot summary ==
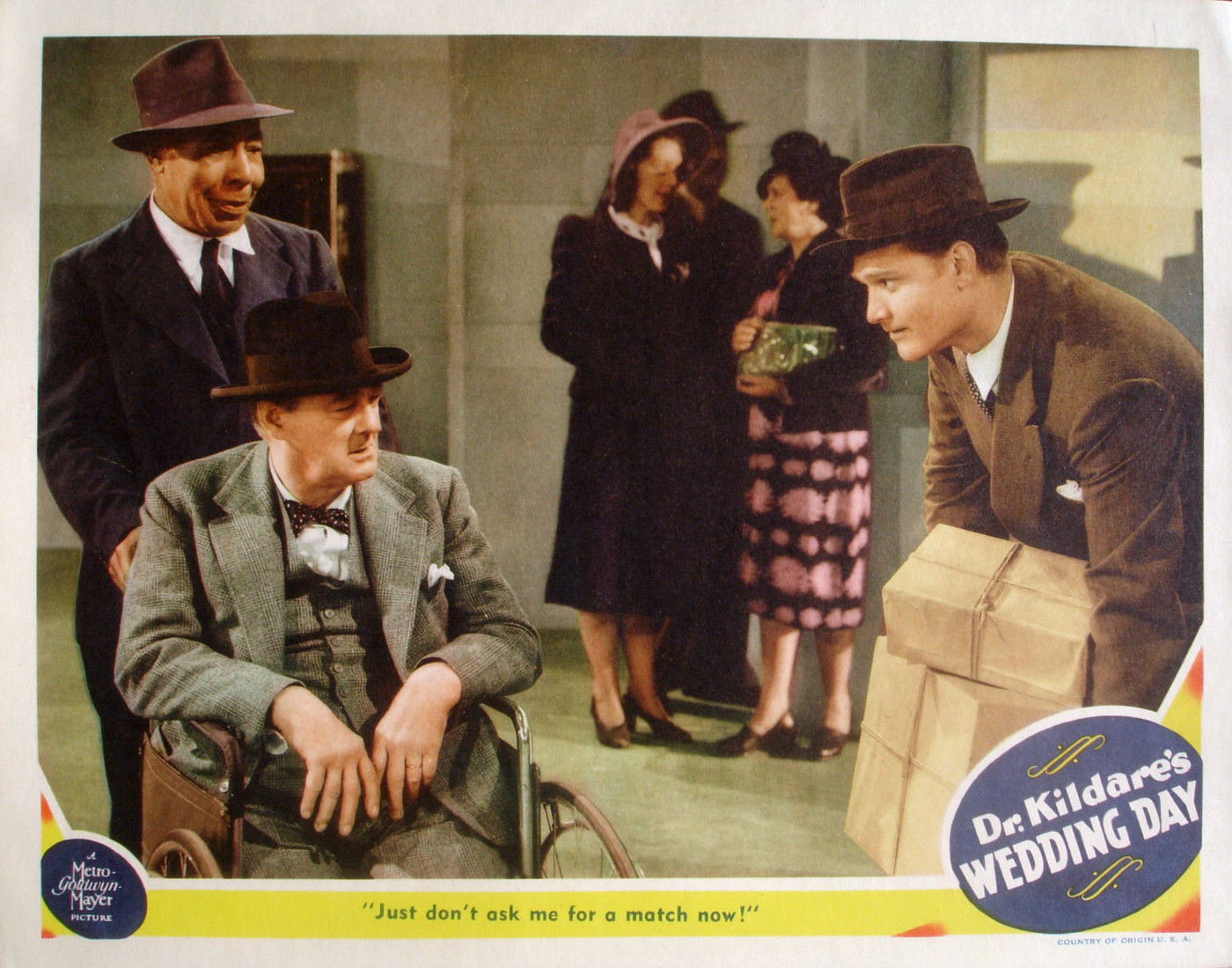
Lionel Barrymore and Red Skelton, whose film career was just beginning at the time

Dr. James Kildare is finally marrying nurse Mary Lamont and everyone at Blair General Hospital in New York is preparing for the wedding. The wedding engenders mixed feelings in his mentor, the gruff Dr. Leonard Gillespie, who realizes his protégé will have less time for him. Worried about his mood, superintendent of nurses Molly Byrd urges Gillespie to find a diversion to take his mind off Kildare.

While attending a performance of Die Walküre, Gillespie is invited to meet the conductor, Maestro Labardi, and notices that he has a physical problem. The next day Labardi comes to Gillespie for an examination. The maestro tells Gillespie that he is losing his hearing and the doctor becomes determined to help him save his career. Gillespie, who has been struggling with melanoma for several years, is so intrigued by the case that he cancels a stay with his cancer specialist, Dr. Lockberg, who contacts Kildare at his wedding rehearsal in Connecticut. Kildare returns immediately and shames Gillespie into completing his appointment.

While Mary continues with the wedding preparations, Kildare and Gillespie both try to solve Labardi's loss of hearing. Kildare must miss a surprise party for his stag night, so Mary goes instead. Tragically and unexpectedly, she is struck by a truck when she steps into the street with her mind on her happiness instead of traffic. Kildare rushes to her side when told of her accident and arrives just before she dies. Her last words: "This is going to be much easier for me than it is for you. Poor, sweet Jimmy.”

Kildare is devastated and unable to continue his work. Gillespie, after a month at Lockberg's clinic, receives a call from Kildare's badly worried father. Gillespie decides to immerse Kildare in the Labardi case to take his mind off Mary's death. Kildare sees Gillespie in his mentor's childhood home and is told the story of a composer, Cornelia Bartlett, with whom Gillespie was in love years ago. She died from yellow fever before Dr. Walter Reed could find a cure for it. It was Reed who convinced Gillespie to focus on medicine instead of his loss.

Kildare reluctantly agrees to return to the hospital for a week, just to help out on the Labardi case. He has a breakthrough on the case, diagnosing a Vitamin B1 deficiency caused by his diet as the source of the impaired hearing. They treat the condition and soon his problems are resolved. Kildare and Gillespie attend a concert where Labardi conducts music written by Cornelia. In a winking bit of cinematic self-reference, after the concert Gillespie can't help but mention that he might have helped Cornelia write the musical score. Kildare is convinced to go on with his life and career as a physician.

== Cast ==
- Lew Ayres as Dr. James Kildare
- Lionel Barrymore as Dr. Leonard Gillespie
- Laraine Day as Mary Lamont
- Red Skelton as Vernon Briggs
- Alma Kruger as Molly Byrd
- Samuel S. Hinds as Dr. Stephen Kildare
- Nils Asther as Constanzo Labardi
- Walter Kingsford as Dr. Walter Carew
- Emma Dunn as Mrs. Martha Kildare
- Miles Mander as Dr. John F. Lockberg
- Nell Craig as Nurse Parker
- Frank Orth as Mike Ryan
- George H. Reed as Conover
- Marie Blake as Sally
- Margaret Seddon as Mrs. Bartlett
- Olive Blakeney as Mrs. Worth

== See also ==
- The Dr. Kildare series
- Lionel Barrymore filmography
