= Dr. Kildare's Victory =

1942 US film directed by W. S. Van Dyke

- Directed by: W. S. Van Dyke
- Written by: Joseph Harrington; Max Brand
- Screenplay by: Harry Ruskin; Willis Goldbeck
- Starring: Lew Ayres; Lionel Barrymore; Ann Ayars
- Cinematography: William H. Daniels
- Edited by: Frank E. Hull
- Music by: Lennie Hayton
- Distributed by: Metro-Goldwyn-Mayer
- Release date: June 25, 1942
- Running time: 92 minutes
- Country: United States
- Language: English

Dr. Kildare's Victory is a 1942 film directed by W. S. Van Dyke. It stars Lew Ayres and Lionel Barrymore. It is the ninth and last of the MGM Dr. Kildare movie series.

== Plot ==
Dr. Kildare is involved in a dispute between two competing hospitals. The trouble begins when an intern rushes a beautiful girl to Kildare's hospital. She has a shard of glass imbedded in her heart.

== Cast ==
- Lew Ayres as Dr. Kildare
- Lionel Barrymore as Dr. Leonard Gillespie
- Ann Ayars as Cynthia Cookie Charles
- Robert Sterling as Dr. Donald Withrop
- Jean Rogers as Ms Annabelle Kirkie
- Alma Kruger as Nurse Molly Byrd
- Walter Kingsford as Dr. Walter Carew
- Nell Craig as Nurse Parker
- Edward Gargan as Orderly Willie Brooks
- Marie Blake as Sally, Switchboard Operator
- Frank Orth as Michael 'Mike' Ryan
- George Reed as Conover (as George H. Reed)
- Barry Nelson as Samuel Z. Cutter
- Eddie Acuff as Orderly Clifford Genet
- Gus Schilling as Orderly Leo Cobb
- Stuart Crawford as Arnold Spencer
- William Bakewell as Mr. Hubble
- Charlotte Wynters as Mrs. Hubble
- Mary Field as Ms. Nixon (uncredited)
- Ray Walker as Taxi Driver with Injured Man (uncredited)

== Production ==
A follow-up film titled Born to be Bad was planned, but after Ayres requested conscientious objector status, he was let go and the Dr. Kildare series came to an end, to be replaced with a series of films centered on Dr. Gillespie.
