= Scandal Street (1938 film) =

1938 film by James P. Hogan

- Directed by: James P. Hogan
- Written by: Bertram Millhauser; Eddie Welch
- Produced by: Edward T. Lowe, Jr.
- Starring: Lew Ayres; Louise Campbell; Roscoe Karns; Porter Hall; Edgar Kennedy; Elizabeth Patterson
- Cinematography: Henry Sharp
- Edited by: James Smith
- Music by: John Leipold
- Production company: Paramount Pictures
- Distributed by: Paramount Pictures
- Release date: February 11, 1938
- Running time: 62 minutes
- Country: United States
- Language: English

Scandal Street is a 1938 American drama film directed by James P. Hogan and written by Bertram Millhauser and Eddie Welch. The film stars Lew Ayres, Louise Campbell, Roscoe Karns, Porter Hall, Edgar Kennedy and Elizabeth Patterson. The film was released on February 11, 1938, by Paramount Pictures.

== Cast ==
- Lew Ayres as Joe McKnight
- Louise Campbell as Nora Langdon
- Roscoe Karns as Austin Brown
- Porter Hall as James Wilson
- Edgar Kennedy as Daniel Webster Smith
- Elizabeth Patterson as Ada Smith
- Cecil Cunningham as Maybelle Murphy
- Virginia Weidler as Wilma 'Willie' Murphy
- Lucien Littlefield as Robert Johnson
- Jan Duggan as Vera Veazy
- Laraine Day as Peg Smith
- Lois Kent as Marilyn Smith
- George Offerman Jr. as Jerome Murphy
- Esther Howard as Birdie Brown
- Carl Switzer as Bennie Nordskudder
- Louise Beavers as Clairce

== Reception ==
Frank Nugent of The New York Times said, "The fictional half of the Criterion's bill is filled by a well-wrought B-plus melodrama from Paramount, an entertaining tidbit called Scandal Street, which considers, for the 'steenth time, the cruelty, malice and stupidity of small-town gossips. Here it is Louise Campbell who suffers the tongue-lashing and the guilty-until-proved-innocent attitude of Peach-tree Lane's residents when the married Don Juan in the next-door house is found murdered. Fortunately, she has wee Virginia Weidler on her side, as well as right, and the murder outs conveniently. As small-town profiles go, this is as definitive as the next, with penetrating sidelights on the weekly bridge nights, the children's dancing school, amours and civic pride."
