= The Ice Follies of 1939 =

1939 film by Reinhold Schünzel

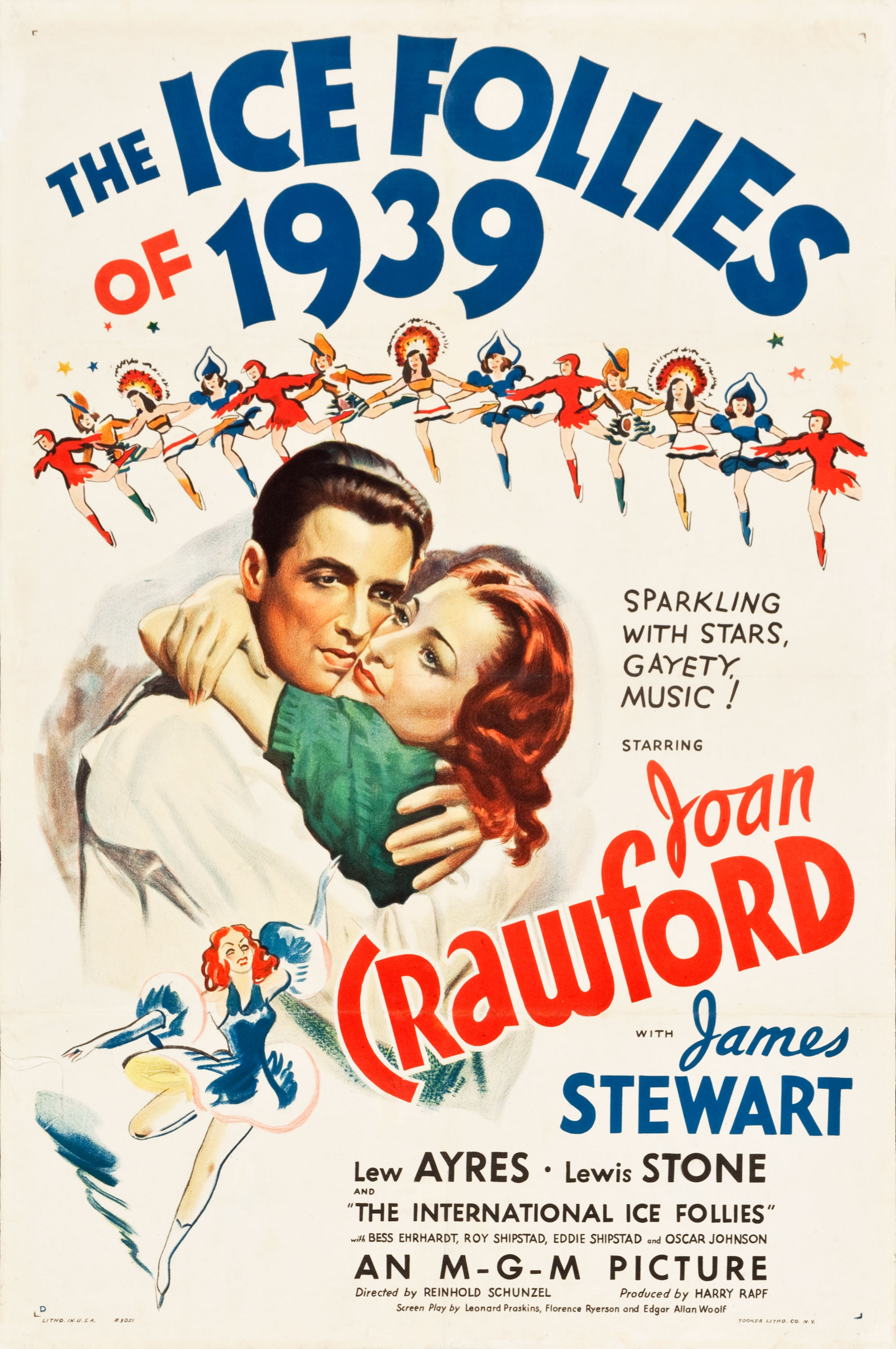
- Theatrical release poster
- Directed by: Reinhold Schünzel
- Screenplay by: Florence Ryerson; Edgar Allan Woolf
- Story by: Leonard Praskins
- Produced by: Harry Rapf
- Starring: Joan Crawford; James Stewart; Lew Ayres; Lewis Stone; The International Ice Follies; Bess Ehrhardt; Roy Shipstad; Eddie Shipstad; Oscar Johnson
- Cinematography: Oliver T. Marsh; Joseph Ruttenberg
- Edited by: W. Donn Hayes
- Music by: George Bassman; Earl K. Brent
- Production company: Metro-Goldwyn-Mayer
- Distributed by: Loew's Inc.
- Release date: March 10, 1939 (United States)
- Running time: 82 minutes
- Country: United States
- Language: English
- Budget: $1,108,000
- Box office: $1,213,000

The Ice Follies of 1939 is a 1939 American musical drama film directed by Reinhold Schünzel, and starring Joan Crawford, James Stewart, Lew Ayres and Lewis Stone.

Using a show business backdrop, and featuring The International Ice Follies, Crawford plays Mary, an actress, who marries an ice skater and encounters career and relationship issues.

== Plot ==
Larry Hall and Eddie Burgess have a successful skating act until Larry falls in love with Mary McKay, an inept skater whom Larry insists upon including in the act. Fired from job after job because of Mary's ineptitude, Larry keeps up his spirits by dreaming of producing a colossal ice show. Following their latest dismissal, the couple elope, and Mary, feeling guilty for damaging her husband's career, convinces Douglas Tolliver, Jr., the head of Monarch Studios, to offer her a movie contract.

While reading the fine print of the contract, Mary discovers that she is forbidden to marry without the studio's permission, and Larry convinces her to keep their marriage a secret. Meanwhile, Eddie is disappointed with how distracted Larry has become and leaves town. After his wife's first picture catapults her to stardom, Larry finds himself relegated to the position of househusband and leaves for New York in hopes of producing his ice extravaganza.

In New York, Larry is reunited with Eddie in the office of producer Mort Hodges, who raises the money to make Larry's dream a reality. Larry's Ice Follies becomes a smash hit, and with husband and wife now equal in stature, Mary and Larry hope to revive their marriage. When they discover that they are still separated by the demands of their careers, however, Mary publicly announces that she is forsaking her career to return to a life of domesticity. The dilemma of their conflicting careers is finally bridged when Tolliver hires Larry to produce a musical film on ice starring his wife, thus uniting their personal and professional lives.

== Cast ==
- Joan Crawford - Mary McKay/Sandra Lee
- James Stewart - Larry Hall
- Lew Ayres - Eddie Burgess
- Lewis Stone - Douglas 'Doug' Tolliver Jr.
- Lionel Stander - Mort Hodges
- Charles D. Brown - Mr. Barney
- Bess Ehrhardt - Kitty Sherman
- The International Ice Follies:
- Roy Shipstad - Himself (Ice Follies Skater)
- Eddie Shipstad - Himself (Ice Follies Skater)
- Oscar Johnson - Himself (Ice Follies Skater)

== Production ==
Although there was little of Joan Crawford's actual skating in The Ice Follies of 1939, MGM sent out press releases to announce that she was rigorously training to sing in the film. (Crawford had already sung on-screen in a few early musicals like The Hollywood Revue of 1929 and Montana Moon.) The releases even suggested that Crawford was so impressive that after performing her six songs in this film, she was considering making her debut at the Metropolitan Opera. When the film premiered, however, her songs had been reduced to two. One was "It's All So New to Me" which she recorded for Victor with commercial release on catalog number 26205.

== Reception ==
A critic in the New York Herald Tribune wrote, "Since some kind of story was needed to lead up to the film debut of "The International Ice Follies," and top-flight players to give it the necessary publicity gloss, Joan Crawford, James Stewart, and Lew Ayres were given the unenviable job of trying to make it digestible. Their acting is smart and likable; their material is not....Miss Crawford should avoid this type of film in the future, when she has to buck poor material, a group of specialists and Metro's own lavishness."

Frank Nugent in The New York Times commented, "Far be it from us to rap one of Mr. Rapf's more glittering productions; what we mildly object to is the fact that the glitter does not extend to the dialogue, the incidents, the characters (for whom "fictitious" is an understatement) or the story, which is the one about the matrimonial clashing of two careers."

=== Box office ===
According to MGM records the film earned $725,000 in the US and Canada and $448,000 elsewhere resulting in a loss of $343,000.

== In popular culture ==
In the 1981 film Mommie Dearest, The Ice Follies of 1939 is the film Crawford is preparing to film in the opening sequences.

In the 2004 film The Aviator, a scene set in the Cocoanut Grove is hosting a themed party based on the "Ice Follies of 1938".
