= Mark Jenkins (actor) =

American actor

- Born: May 8, 1943 (age 82); Butte, Montana, U.S.
- Occupation: Actor

Mark Jenkins (born May 8, 1943) is an American actor. He portrayed the title character in the short-lived 1972 television series Young Dr. Kildare. One of his film portrayals was that of Lt. Shawn (Piedmont Team) Stone in the film adaptation of Michael Crichton's The Andromeda Strain (1971).

== Filmography ==
Year	Title	Role	Notes
1968	The Filthy Five	Billy Delavanti	
1968	Riverrun	Dan	
1970	Medical Center	Phil Teague	1 episode
1971-1974	Hawaii Five-O	Ted Reynolds / Arthur Salton / Collins	3 episodes
1971	Doctors' Wives	Lew Saunders	
1971	The Andromeda Strain	Lt. Shawn (Piedmont team)	
1977	The Man from Atlantis	Lt. Ainsley	1 episode
1986	Desert Bloom	AEC Officer	
1986	Red Headed Stranger	Victor Claver	
1991	To Cross the Rubicon	Stuart Taylor-Ford	
