= Lew Ayres =

American actor (1908–1996)

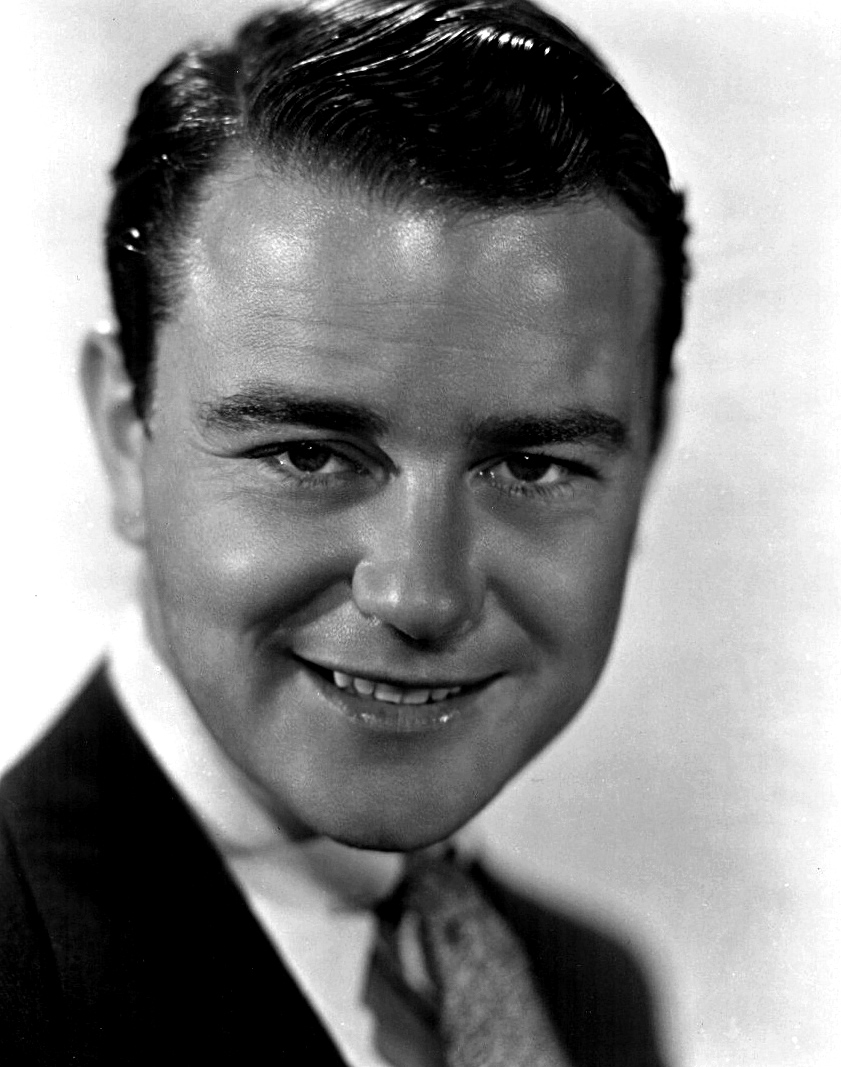
- Ayres in the 1930s
- Born: Lewis Frederick Ayres III; December 28, 1908; Minneapolis, Minnesota, U.S.
- Died: December 30, 1996 (aged 88); Los Angeles, California, U.S.
- Resting place: Westwood Village Memorial Park
- Occupation: Actor
- Years active: 1927–1989
- Known for: All Quiet on the Western Front; Johnny Belinda; State Fair; Servants' Entrance; Iron Man; The Doorway to Hell
- Spouses: Lola Lane (m. 1931; div. 1933) Ginger Rogers (m. 1934; div. 1940) Diana Hall (m. 1964)
- Children: 1

Lewis Frederick Ayres III (December 28, 1908 – December 30, 1996) was an American actor whose film and television career spanned 65 years. He is best known for starring as German soldier Paul Bäumer in the film All Quiet on the Western Front (1930) and for playing Dr. Kildare in nine films. He was nominated for an Academy Award for Best Actor for his performance in Johnny Belinda (1948).

== Early life and career ==
Ayres was born in Minneapolis to Irma Bevernick and Louis Ayres, who divorced when he was four. Louis, an amateur musician and court reporter, remarried soon afterwards.

As a teen, he and his mother moved with his step-father, William Gilmore, and half-brother and sister to San Diego, California.

Leaving high school before graduating, he started a small band which traveled to Mexico. He returned months later to pursue an acting career, but continued working full-time as a musician. He played banjo and guitar for big bands, including the Henry Halstead Orchestra. He recorded one of the earliest Vitaphone movie shorts called Carnival Night in Paris (Warner Brothers, 1927).

Ayres wrote, "I was a member of Henry Halstead's orchestra in 1927 at the Mission Beach Ballroom in San Diego, California for the summer. My instruments were tenor banjo, long-neck banjo and guitar. After a hiatus, I rejoined Mr. Halstead with a new group, including Phil Harris, on New Year's Eve the same year for the opening night of the Beverly Wilshire Hotel, a memorable occasion."

He left a national tour to pursue a career as an actor full-time.

== Career ==
Ayres was discovered at a nightclub by talent agent Ivan Kahn. He was cast to play opposite Greta Garbo in The Kiss (1929), but it was his leading role in the original version of All Quiet on the Western Front (1930) that made him a star, secured him a contract with Universal—and made him a conscientious objector to World War II.

He made a number of mostly forgotten B movies for Universal, with the exception of Iron Man (1931), with Jean Harlow. His most successful movies at this time were those he made on loan to other studios, including The Doorway to Hell (1930) with James Cagney in a supporting role, and as Janet Gaynor's leading man in both State Fair (1933) and Servants' Entrance (1934), which featured a combination of live action and Walt Disney animation in a musical dream sequence, both for Fox Films.

Ayres left Universal to sign with Fox Films. In 1934, Fox listed him as one of its second tier stars.

He moved to poverty row studio Republic Pictures to pursue a second career as a director, including the film Hearts in Bondage (1936), starring James Dunn and Mae Clarke. He moved to Paramount Pictures before finally being signed to MGM in 1938. At this time, he was loaned from Paramount to play the role of Ned in Holiday (1938).

The role earned him considerable critical attention, including interest from MGM to put him under contract specifically for the role of Dr. James Kildare in an upcoming film series. Ayres played the role in nine films from 1938 to 1942 (and again in a 1950s radio series) while also appearing in light comedies for MGM, including Spring Madness and Rich Man, Poor Girl (both 1938), The Ice Follies of 1939 (1939), and Fingers at the Window (1942). His final film as Dr. Kildare, Born to Be Bad, was re-edited after he was drafted and declared himself a conscientious objector in March 1942.

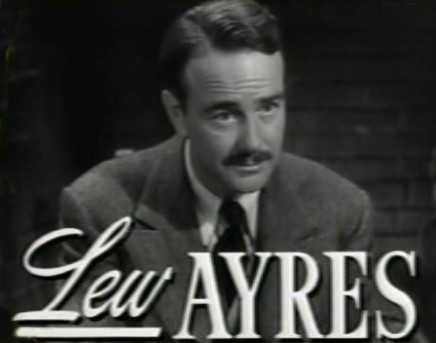
in Johnny Belinda (1948)

He returned to acting in the films The Dark Mirror (1946) with Olivia de Havilland and The Unfaithful (1947) with Ann Sheridan. For his role in Johnny Belinda (1948) he received an Academy Award nomination for Best Actor; co-star Jane Wyman won for Best Actress.

Ayres gradually moved to television, appearing in several anthology series in guest roles. In the summer of 1958, he hosted eleven original episodes of a CBS Western anthology television series called Frontier Justice, a production of Dick Powell's Four Star Television. He was offered the part of Dr. Kildare in an NBC series but his prescient request that the show have no cigarette advertising led to the offer being withdrawn. (In 1961, the part went to Raymond Massey. He appeared (as the vice-president) in Advise & Consent (1962), and in The Carpetbaggers (1964), but he was, by then, primarily a television actor, with only occasional film work. Ayres appeared in the pilot episode of Hawaii Five-O, "Cocoon", as "The Governor" (the role was played by Richard Denning for the remainder of the series' run). Ayres would appear in two other episodes of the series, "Anyone Can Build a Bomb" in 1973 and "Legacy of Terror" in 1976.

For a guest role in Kung Fu ("The Vanishing Image", 1974) he was nominated for an Emmy.

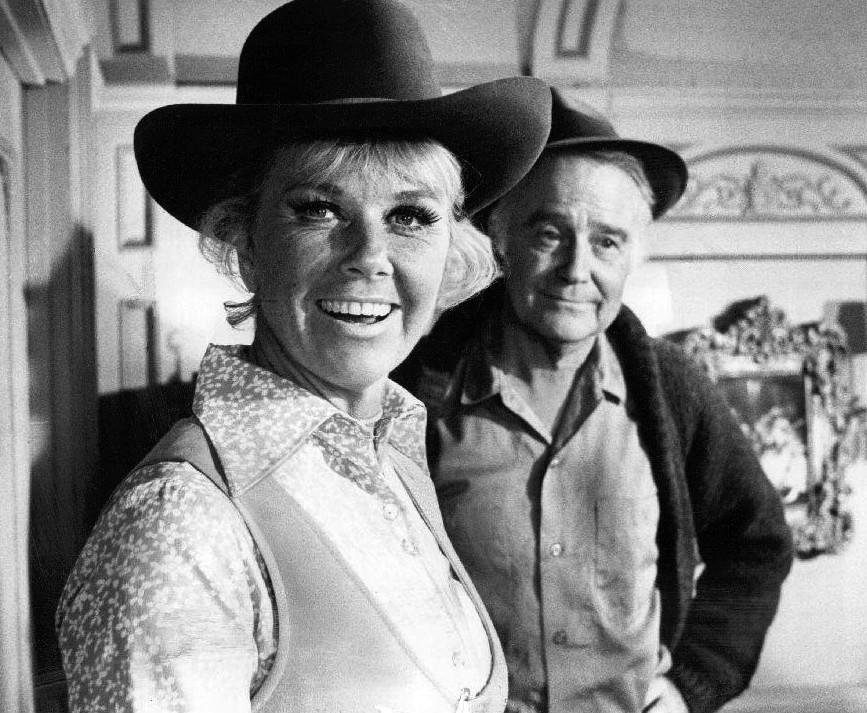
Doris Day and Ayres in The Doris Day Show (1970)

His documentary film Altars of the World (1976), based on a series of documentaries he made titled Altars of the East (1956), brought his Eastern philosophical beliefs to the screen and earned him critical acclaim and a Golden Globe Award for best documentary in 1977.

Ayres guest-starred in an episode of The Bionic Woman ("Doomsday is Tomorrow", 1977) as Dr. Elijah Cooper, an elderly nuclear scientist who attempts to blackmail the world into peace. In 1973 he played a similar role on Hawaii Five-O as a nuclear scientist who in a twist ending ends up dying of radiation from his own bomb.

In 1985, he was cast in his first series as a regular cast member, as the father of Robert Wagner in the short-lived series Lime Street. His last role was in the made-for-TV film Hart to Hart: Crimes of the Heart (1994), also starring Wagner.

=== World War II conscientious objector and medic ===
In March 1942, Ayres was identified as a 4E conscientious objector and sent to a CO camp. As expected, the announcement that a Hollywood actor objected to the war was a major source of public outcry and debate. Within a month it was determined that he had initially requested to be 1-A-O, so that he could serve as a non-combat medic. However, the military's policy that servicemen cannot request, or be guaranteed, where they will serve, forced him to request a 4E status. The U.S. military confirmed that they would place him as a medic and in April 1942, his status was changed. He enlisted in the United States Army on May 18, 1942.

He served as a first aid instructor in the United States Army before requesting a drop in rank in order to serve as a medic and chaplain's assistant in the Pacific. He was one of 16 medics who arrived under fire during the invasion of Leyte to set up evacuation hospitals, and there he provided care to soldiers and civilians in the Philippines and New Guinea. He donated all the money he had earned as a serviceman to the American Red Cross.

Serving for three and a half years in the Medical Corps, he was awarded three battle stars. After the war, he resumed his career and made scores of movies, but never reached the peak of his early Hollywood stardom.

== Personal life ==
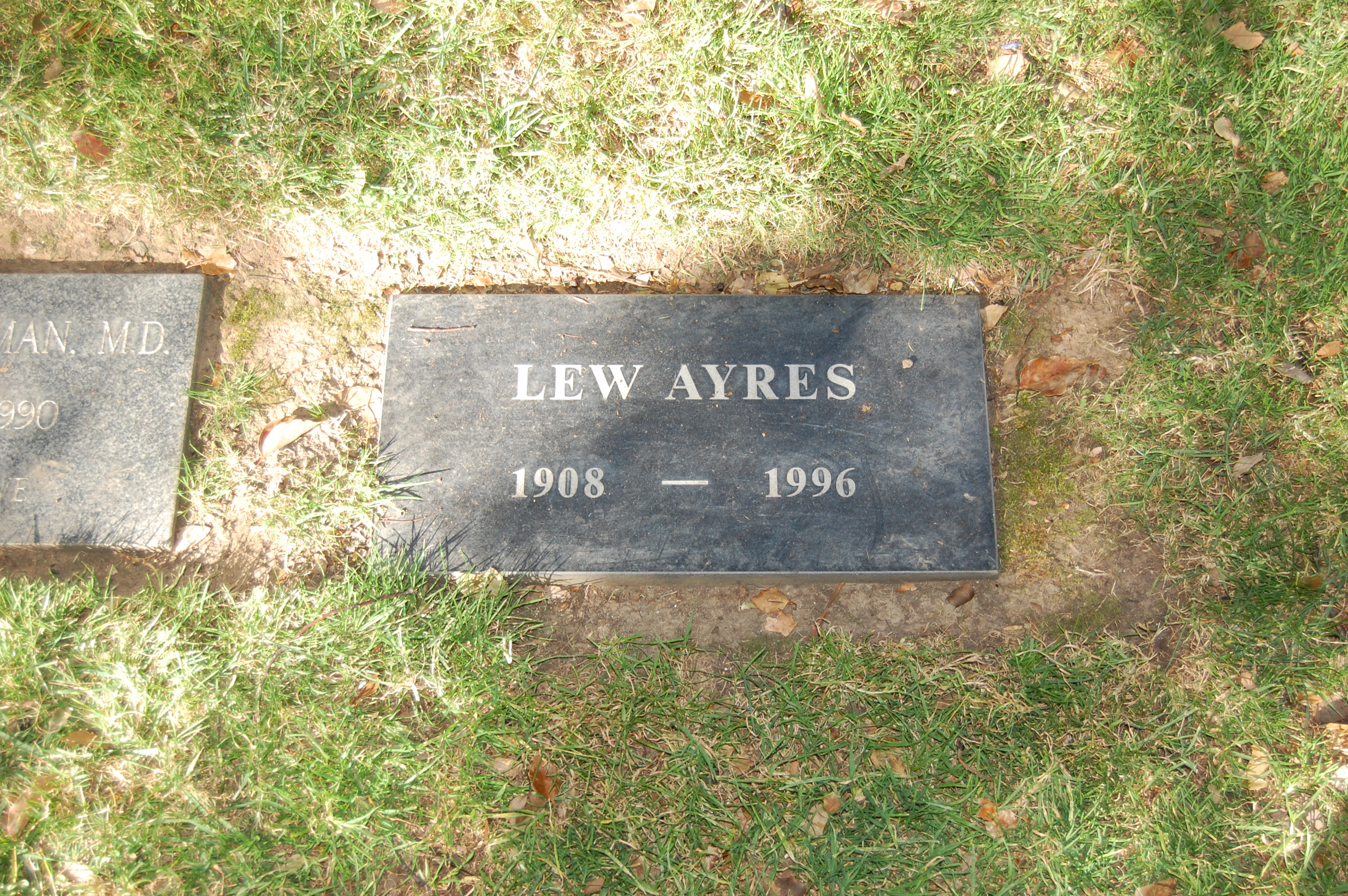
Ayres' grave

Ayres was married three times. First to actress Lola Lane from 1931 until 1933, although they were separated much of that period. He met actress Ginger Rogers while starring in the film Don't Bet on Love in 1933 and they wed in 1934. They separated in 1936 and divorced in March 1940. His third marriage, to Diana Hall, lasted from 1964 until his death in 1996. Their son Justin was born in 1968.

Ayres was a strict vegetarian.

== Death and legacy ==
In 1960, Lew Ayres was inducted into the Hollywood Walk of Fame with two stars. His motion pictures star is located at 6385 Hollywood Boulevard while his radio star is located at 1724 Vine Street.

Ayres died on December 30, 1996, two days after his 88th birthday. His body was buried under a simple headstone at Westwood Memorial Park in Westwood, Los Angeles.

== Filmography ==
- The Sophomore (1929) as Sophomore Fraternity Brother (uncredited)
- Big News (1929) as Copyboy (uncredited)
- The Kiss (1929) as Pierre
- All Quiet on the Western Front (1930) as Paul
- Common Clay (1930) as Hugh Fullerton
- The Doorway to Hell (1930) as Louie
- East Is West (1930) as Billy Benson
- Many a Slip (1931) as Jerry Brooks
- Iron Man (1931) as Kid Mason
- Up for Murder (1931) as Robert Marshall
- The Spirit of Notre Dame (1931) as Bucky O'Brien
- Heaven on Earth (1931) as States
- The Impatient Maiden (1932) as Dr. Myron Brown
- The Cohens and Kellys in Hollywood (1932) as Himself
- Night World (1932) as Michael Rand
- Okay, America! (1932) as Larry Wayne
- State Fair (1933) as Pat Gilbert
- Don't Bet on Love (1933) as Bill McCaffery
- My Weakness (1933) as Ronnie Gregory
- Cross Country Cruise (1934) as Norman Winthrop
- Let's Be Ritzy (1934) as Jimmy Sterling
- She Learned About Sailors (1934) as Larry Wilson
- Servants' Entrance (1934) as Erik Landstrom
- Lottery Lover (1935) as Cadet Frank Harrington
- Spring Tonic (1935) as Caleb Enix
- Silk Hat Kid (1935) as Eddie Howard
- The Leathernecks Have Landed (1936) as Woodruff 'Woody' Davis
- Panic on the Air (1936) as Jerry Franklin
- Shakedown (1936) as Bob Sanderson
- Lady Be Careful (1936) as Chester aka Dynamite
- Murder with Pictures (1936) as Kent Murdock
- The Crime Nobody Saw (1937) as Nick Milburn
- The Last Train from Madrid (1937) as Bill Dexter
- Hold 'em Navy (1937) as Tommy Graham
- Scandal Street (1938) as Joe McKnight
- King of the Newsboys (1938) as Jerry Flynn
- Holiday (1938) as Ned Seton
- Rich Man, Poor Girl (1938) as Henry Thayer
- Young Dr. Kildare (1938) as Dr. James Kildare
- Spring Madness (1938) as Sam Thatcher
- The Ice Follies of 1939 (1939) as Eddie Burgess
- Broadway Serenade (1939) as James Geoffrey Seymour
- Calling Dr. Kildare (1939) as Dr. James Kildare
- These Glamour Girls (1939) as Philip S. Griswold
- The Secret of Dr. Kildare (1939) as Dr. James 'Jimmy' Kildare
- Remember? (1939) as Sky Ames
- Dr. Kildare's Strange Case (1940) as Dr. James 'Jimmy' Kildare
- The Golden Fleecing (1940) as Henry Twinkle
- Dr. Kildare Goes Home (1940) as Dr. James Kildare
- Dr. Kildare's Crisis (1940) as Dr. James 'Jimmy' Kildare
- Maisie Was a Lady (1941) as Bob Rawlston
- The People vs. Dr. Kildare (1941) as Dr. James Kildare
- Dr. Kildare's Wedding Day (1941) as Dr. James Kildare
- Dr. Kildare's Victory (1942) as Dr. James Kildare
- Fingers at the Window (1942) as Oliver Duffy
- The Dark Mirror (1946) as Dr. Scott Elliott
- The Unfaithful (1947) as Larry Hannaford
- The Way of Peace (1947, Short) as Narrator (voice)
- Johnny Belinda (1948) as Dr. Robert Richardson
- The Capture (1950) as Vanner
- New Mexico (1951) as Capt. Hunt
- No Escape (1953) as John Howard Tracy
- Donovan's Brain (1953) as Dr. Patrick Cory
- The Ford Show with Tennessee Ernie Ford (1958, TV series) as Father John Gerald
- The DuPont Show with June Allyson (1960, TV series) as Howard Moon
- The Barbara Stanwyck Show (NBC, 1961, TV series) as Dr. Paul Harris
- Advise & Consent (1962) as the (U.S.) Vice President – Harley Hudson
- The Carpetbaggers (1964) as 'Mac' McAllister
- Gunsmoke (1967, TV series) as Cole in "The Prodigal"
- The Big Valley (1967–1968, TV series) as Jason Fleet / Sheriff Roy Kingston
- Hawaii Five-O (1968, TV series pilot) as Governor Paul Jameson
- Here Come the Brides (1969) as Matthew Muncey
- Marcus Welby M.D. (1969) as Dr. Andrew Swanson
- My Three Sons (1970) as Professor Harper
- The Doris Day Show (1970, TV series) as William Tyler
- Earth II (1971, TV movie) as U.S. President Charles Carter Durant
- The Biscuit Eater (1972) as Mr. Ames
- The Man (1972) as U.S. Vice President Noah Calvin
- The Stranger (1973, TV movie) as Prof. Dylan MacAuley
- Battle for the Planet of the Apes (1973) as Mandemus
- Hawaii Five-O (1973, TV series) as Dr. Elias Haig in "Anybody Can Build a Bomb" (S6/Ep12)
- Hawkins (1973, TV series) in "Blood Feud" (S1/Ep4)
- The Questor Tapes (1974, TV movie) as Vaslovik
- The Magician (1974, TV series) as Max Braden in "The Illusion Of The Evil Spikes"
- Heat Wave! (1974, TV movie) as Dr. Grayson
- Columbo: Mind over Mayhem (NBC, 1974, TV series) as Dr. Howard Nicholson
- Kung Fu (ABC, 1974) as Beaumont. Nominated for an Emmy, Outstanding Single Performance by a Supporting Actor in a Comedy or Drama Series - 1975.
- Little House on the Prairie (NBC, 1976)
- The Bionic Woman (1977, TV series) as Dr. Elijah Cooper
- The New Adventures of Wonder Woman (1977, TV series) as Dr. Kenneth Wilson
- The Mary Tyler Moore Show (1977, TV series) as Doug Booth
- End of the World (1977) as Beckerman
- Damien - Omen II (1978) as Bill Atherton
- Battlestar Galactica: Saga of a Star World (1978) as Twelve Colonies President Adar
- Salem's Lot (1979, TV movie) as Jason Burke
- Little House a new Beginning (1983) as Mr McCarey
- The World of Don Camillo (1984) as Doc
- Lime Street (1985–1986) as Henry Wade Culver
- The A-Team (1986) as Bernie Greene
- Highway to Heaven (1985–1989, TV series) as Ivan Zelenka / Frank Worton / Harry Haynes

== Radio ==
- Philip Morris Playhouse—episode Dark Victory (1952)
- The Story of Dr. Kildare (1949–1951 series)

== See also ==
- List of actors with Academy Award nominations
