= Calling Dr. Kildare =

1939 film by Harold S. Bucquet

- Film poster
- Directed by: Harold S. Bucquet
- Screenplay by: Harry Ruskin; Willis Goldbeck
- Based on: "Calling Dr. Kildare"; 1940 novel by Max Brand
- Produced by: Lou Ostrow
- Starring: Lew Ayres; Lionel Barrymore
- Cinematography: Alfred Gilks; Lester White
- Edited by: Robert J. Kern
- Music by: David Snell
- Production company: Metro-Goldwyn-Mayer
- Distributed by: Loew's Inc.
- Release date: April 28, 1939
- Running time: 86 minutes
- Country: United States
- Language: English
- Budget: $271,000
- Box office: $892,000

Calling Dr. Kildare is a 1939 film in the Dr. Kildare series. Directed by Harold S. Bucquet, it stars Lew Ayres as the young Dr. Kildare and Lionel Barrymore as Dr. Gillespie, his mentor. The second of MGM's series of Kildare films, it introduces Laraine Day as nurse Mary Lamont, the love of Kildare's life.

== Plot ==
Dr. Leonard Gillespie, the crusty senior diagnostician at New York's Blair General Hospital, has a severe disagreement with a pupil, intern James Kildare, over a suspected case of Q fever. He decides to teach his stubborn assistant a lesson in dealing with the emotional causes of his patients' ills, as well as the physical. To accomplish this, has Kildare reassigned to work in a neighborhood dispensary with nurse Mary Lamont, whom he enlists with the aid of head nurse Molly Byrd to "stooge" on the intern.

On the day that Kildare begins his new job, young Red enters the dispensary and confidentially asks the intern to help a friend injured in a stabbing, Nick Lewett. He follows Red to a cellar hideout, where he discovers that Nick is suffering from a gunshot wound, which a doctor must legally report to law enforcement authorities. Kildare is on the verge of sending Nick on to Blair when Nick's sister Rosalie convinces him not to do so. Nick confesses to getting wounded over a gambling debt, but operating on his own intuition Kildare is convinced Nick is innocent of any crime. Knowing he is risking his career, as well as imprisonment and the hospital's reputation, Kildare continues to treat Nick in the hideout, even after he learns that the boy is wanted for the murder of bookmaker "Footsy" Garson. Smitten with Rosalie, he tells Mary he knows that she has been reporting back to Gillespie on his activities.

Despite Mary's resistance, Gillespie uses her obvious admiration for Kildare to persuade her to tell him what Kildare is up to, and tries to warn the intern that he is flirting with being an accessory to murder. He tries to persuade Kildare to at least reveal Nick's whereabouts, but Kildare is sure of Nick's innocence and refuses to do so. A worried Gillespie arranges with Kildare's mother to call him home to help his physician father with a difficult patient, but when Kildare returns to New York City he is picked up by the police along with Nick. For his involvement, Kildare is yet again suspended from the hospital staff, but remains determined to prove Nick's innocence.

Learning from Nick that he went to see Garson after his friend Tom Crandell accused Garson of maligning Rosalie, Kildare decides to confront Crandell. With the help of ambulance driver Joe Wayman and his persuasive monkey wrench, Kildare compels Crandell into confessing that he killed Garson and shot Nick. After Nick is exonerated, Gillespie visits Rosalie and deduces that she was Crandell's girlfriend. He steers her into admitting to Kildare that her only interest in him was to save her brother, and later confesses to Kildare that Gillespie had arranged for Nick's arrest, but that Kildare almost ruined the plan by returning from home early. A little wiser, Kildare resumes as Dr. Gillespie's assistant and begins to look at Nurse Lamont in a better light.

== Cast ==
- Lew Ayres as Dr. James Kildare
- Lionel Barrymore as Dr. Leonard Gillespie
- Laraine Day as Mary Lamont
- Nat Pendleton as Joe Wayman
- Lana Turner as Rosalie Lewett
- Lynne Carver as Alice Raymond
- Samuel S. Hinds as Dr. Stephen Kildare
- Emma Dunn as Mrs. Martha Kildare
- Reed Hadley as Tom Crandall
- Roger Converse as Dr. Joiner

== Release ==
Calling Dr. Kildare was released in April 1939, the second in MGM's Kildare series. According to MGM records, the film earned $626,000 in the US and Canada and $266,000 elsewhere, resulting in a profit of $307,000.

New York Times reviewer Frank Nugent, while bemoaning the damage done to artistic values by series pictures, still called it "pleasantly entertaining" and "on the whole, successfully sugar-coated".

=== Home media ===
On January 21, 2014, Warner Archive released the film on Region 1 MOD-DVD as part of the "Dr. Kildare Movie Collection", containing all nine films starring Ayres and Barrymore.
