= Dr. Kildare =

Fictional character

Dr. James Kildare
- Original cover of first Dr. Kildare novel by Max Brand, Young Dr. Kildare (1938)
- First appearance: "Internes Can't Take Money", short story by Max Brand published in Cosmopolitan magazine, Mar. 1936
- Created by: Frederick Schiller Faust (as Max Brand)
- Portrayed by: (1) Joel McCrea (Internes Can't Take Money, 1937 Paramount film) (2) Lew Ayres (1930s–1940s MGM film series and 1950s radio series) (3) Richard Chamberlain (Dr. Kildare, 1961–1966 NBC TV series) (4) Mark Jenkins (Young Dr. Kildare, 1972–1973 syndicated TV series)

In-universe information
- Nickname: "Jimmy" Kildare
- Gender: Male
- Title: Doctor
- Occupation: Physician
- Family: Dr Stephen Kildare (father); Martha Kildare (mother)
- Nationality: American

Dr. James Kildare is a fictional American medical doctor, originally created in the 1930s by the author Frederick Schiller Faust under the pen name Max Brand. Shortly after the character's first appearance in a magazine story, Paramount Pictures used the story and character as the basis for the 1937 film Internes Can't Take Money, starring Joel McCrea as Jimmie Kildare. Metro-Goldwyn-Mayer (MGM) subsequently acquired the rights and featured Kildare as the primary character in a series of American theatrical films in the late 1930s and early 1940s. Several of these films were co-written by Faust (as Max Brand), who also continued to write magazine stories and novels about the character until the early 1940s. Kildare was portrayed by Lew Ayres in nine MGM films. (Ayres was drafted in 1942 and served as a non-combatant medic until 1946.) Later films set in the same hospital featured Dr. Gillespie (Lionel Barrymore). Ayres returned to voice the Kildare character in an early 1950s radio series. The 1961–1966 Dr. Kildare television series made a star of Richard Chamberlain and gave birth to a comic book and comic strip based on the show. A short-lived reboot of the TV series, Young Doctor Kildare, debuted in 1972 and ran for 24 episodes.

== Magazine stories and novels ==
=== Original series ===
The author Frederick Schiller Faust, writing as Max Brand, created the character of Dr. James Kildare as a fictionalized version of his college friend, Dr. George Winthrop "Dixie" Fish, a New York surgeon. He first introduced the character in a short story, "Internes Can't Take Money", that appeared in the March 1936 issue of Cosmopolitan magazine. A second Kildare story, "Whiskey Sour", was published in Cosmopolitan in April 1938. In these early stories, Dr. James "Jimmy" Kildare is an aspiring surgeon who leaves his parents' farm to practice at a fictional big-city hospital, and through his work, comes into contact with underworld criminals. The first Kildare film, Internes Can't Take Money (1937), based on the short story of the same title and made by Paramount, followed this version of the character.

In 1938, Metro-Goldwyn-Mayer (MGM) contracted with Faust to acquire the rights to the Kildare character along with Faust's services as a film story writer. Faust then made major changes to the character to fit MGM's idea for a new movie series, including changing Kildare's specialty to diagnostics rather than surgery, introducing the character of Kildare's superior Dr. Leonard Gillespie, de-emphasizing the criminal elements, and restarting the story from Kildare's first arrival at the city hospital. Faust (as Brand) collaborated with MGM on its Kildare film series starting with the first MGM series release, Young Dr. Kildare (1938) and continuing through The People vs. Dr. Kildare (1941). During this time, Faust wrote several original Kildare stories which were first published in magazines, later republished in novel form, and made into films by MGM. The stories were written prior to the films being made, and were not published as movie tie-ins.

After The People vs. Dr. Kildare, Faust and MGM parted ways. Faust was not involved in Dr. Kildare's Wedding Day, Dr. Kildare's Victory, or any of the subsequent films featuring Dr. Gillespie, although Faust (as Brand) continued to receive a credit for creating the characters. Faust's last two Kildare stories, "Dr. Kildare's Hardest Case" (published in 1942) and the unfinished story "Dr. Kildare's Dilemma" (posthumously published in the early 1970s), were not made into films. In 1944, Faust was killed in Italy while working as a war correspondent.

==== Dr. Kildare story list ====
This table lists the Max Brand-authored Kildare stories in chronological order of first publication. Due to the continuing popularity of the characters in film, radio and television series, many reprints, different formats, and different versions of the original Kildare books have since been released.

Story title	Magazine publication	First book publication (does not include later reprints)	Film based on story	Notes
"Internes Can't Take Money"	Cosmopolitan, Mar. 1936	Included in The Collected Stories of Max Brand (ed. Robert and Jane Easton), Univ. of Nebraska Press, 1994, pp. 218–235.	Internes Can't Take Money (1937)	First appearance of Dr. Kildare character, basis for first Kildare film, made by Paramount
"Whiskey Sour"	Cosmopolitan, Apr. 1938	None	None	MGM acquired the rights to this story as a possible concept for a Kildare film, but it was never developed.
"Young Dr. Kildare"	Serialized in three parts in Argosy : Dec. 17, 1938 (part 1); Dec. 24, 1938 (part 2); Dec. 31, 1938 (part 3)	Young Dr. Kildare, Dodd, Mead (1940)	Young Dr. Kildare (1938)	Basis for first film in Kildare series made by MGM, first appearance of Dr. Gillespie character
"Calling Dr. Kildare"	Serialized in three parts in Argosy : Mar. 25, 1939 (part 1); Apr. 1, 1939 (part 2); Apr. 8, 1939 (part 3)	Calling Dr. Kildare, Dodd, Mead (1940)	Calling Dr. Kildare (1939)	Basis for second film in MGM series
"The Secret of Dr. Kildare"	Cosmopolitan, Sept. 1939 (condensed version)	The Secret of Dr. Kildare, Dodd, Mead (1940)	The Secret of Dr. Kildare (1939)	Basis for third film in MGM series
"Dr. Kildare's Girl" (alternate title: "Dr. Kildare's Search")	Photoplay, Apr. 1940	Dr. Kildare's Search, Dodd, Mead (1942) (compilation of "Dr. Kildare's Girl" and "Dr. Kildare's Hardest Case")	Dr. Kildare's Strange Case (1940)	Basis for fourth film in MGM series
"Dr. Kildare Goes Home"	Serialized in four parts in Argosy : Jun. 1, 1940 (part 1); Jun. 8, 1940 (part 2); Jun. 15, 1940 (part 3); Jun. 22, 1940 (part 4)	Dr. Kildare Goes Home, Dodd, Mead (1941) (alternate title: Dr. Kildare Takes Charge)	Dr. Kildare Goes Home (1940)	Basis for fifth film in MGM series
"Dr. Kildare's Crisis"	Serialized in four parts in Argosy : Dec. 21, 1940 (part 1); Dec. 28, 1940 (part 2); Jan. 4, 1940 (part 3); Jan. 11, 1941 (part 4)	Dr. Kildare's Crisis, Dodd, Mead (1942)	Dr. Kildare's Crisis (1940)	Basis for sixth film in MGM series
"The People vs. Dr. Kildare"	Cosmopolitan, May 1941 (condensed version)	Dr. Kildare's Trial, Dodd, Mead (1942)	The People vs. Dr. Kildare (1941)	Basis for seventh film in MGM series, last collaboration between Faust and MGM
"Dr. Kildare's Hardest Case"	Cosmopolitan, Mar. 1942	Dr. Kildare's Search, Dodd, Mead (1942) (compilation of "Dr. Kildare's Girl" and "Dr. Kildare's Hardest Case")	None	Faust's last complete Kildare story.
"Dr. Kildare's Dilemma" (unfinished four-part story)	Published in two parts in The Faust Collector, a Los Angeles fanzine edited by William Clark: Feb. 1971 (part 1); Jan. 1973 (part 2)	A restored fragment was included in The Max Brand Companion (ed. Jon Tuska et al.), Greenwood Press, 1996, pp. 318–335.	None	Faust's last Kildare story, never finished, posthumously published in the 1970s in unfinished form

Aside from the Kildare stories, Faust (as Brand) wrote only one other medical story, "My People", which appeared in the August 1940 issue of Cosmopolitan. "My People" featured a character, "Dr. Maynard", who was similar to Dr. Kildare. MGM acquired the rights to "My People" as a possible concept for a Kildare film, but it was never developed.

=== Television tie-ins ===
The popularity of the 1960s Dr. Kildare TV series and its star, Richard Chamberlain, resulted in a number of contemporary tie-in novels by several different authors. Several were released in mass-market paperback form by Lancer Books, while titles aimed at preteen and young teen readers were published by Whitman Publishing. The covers featured photographs of Chamberlain as Kildare, or artwork using his likeness. Known titles are listed below.

By Robert C. Ackworth:

- Dr. Kildare (Lancer, 1962)
- Dr. Kildare: Assigned to Trouble (Whitman, 1963) (with Robert L. Jenney, illustrator)

By Norman A. Daniels:

- Dr. Kildare's Secret Romance (Lancer, 1962)
- Dr. Kildare's Finest Hour (Lancer, 1963)

By William Johnston:

- Dr. Kildare: The Faces of Love (Lancer, 1963)
- Dr. Kildare: The Heart Has an Answer (Lancer, 1963)
- Dr. Kildare: The Magic Key (Whitman, 1964) (with Al Andersen, illustrator)

== Films ==
=== Internes Can't Take Money ===
The character of Dr. Kildare first appeared on film in the 1937 Paramount film, Internes Can't Take Money, based on Max Brand's previously published short story of the same name and starring Joel McCrea as Dr. Kildare. The plot focuses on Dr. Kildare's attempt to help a young female ex-convict (played by Barbara Stanwyck) locate her child. Paramount did not plan any further Kildare films, probably because box-office returns did not meet expectations.

=== MGM film series (1930s–1940s) ===
Lionel Barrymore as Dr. Gillespie and Lew Ayres as Dr. Kildare in Young Dr. Kildare (1938), the first of nine MGM "Dr. Kildare" series films in which the duo appeared

MGM had noted the popularity of the Kildare character in pulp magazines and, following the release of Internes Can't Take Money, saw an opportunity to obtain an undervalued property and develop a successful film series. In 1938, MGM entered into a deal with author Faust (Brand) to acquire the rights to Dr. Kildare and have Faust work with MGM on developing stories for a film series. Seven Dr. Kildare films were subsequently made by MGM based on stories originally written by Faust. After The People vs. Dr. Kildare (1941), Faust and MGM ended their collaboration and MGM continued the series using stories by other writers, though Faust still received a credit for creating the characters.

In the MGM series, the Dr. Kildare character (played by Lew Ayres) first appears as a medical intern newly arrived at a New York City hospital, where he attracts the attention of a respected older physician and skilled diagnostician, Dr. Leonard Gillespie (played by Lionel Barrymore). After becoming a physician, Kildare faces a number of professional and personal challenges in the course of his work, while being mentored by Gillespie.

In 1942, during the making of the tenth film in the MGM series, originally titled Born to Be Bad, Ayres was drafted to serve in WWII and declared himself a conscientious objector. The resulting negative publicity caused MGM to cut Ayres from the film, eliminate the character of Kildare, and change the film's focus to Barrymore's character Gillespie, eventually releasing the revamped film as Calling Dr. Gillespie (1942). Dr. Kildare simply vanished from the series, without explanation, and for Calling Dr. Gillespie the character of a young doctor mentored by the experienced Dr. Gillespie was played by Philip Dorn (as Dr. John Hunter Gerniede). MGM made several more films featuring the Dr. Gillespie character mentoring various young doctors played by Van Johnson (as Dr. Randall "Red" Adams), Keye Luke (as Dr. Lee Wong How), and James Craig (as Dr. Tommy Coalt). After leaving the series, the character of Kildare was never seen, heard or so much as mentioned in any of the subsequent films.

==== MGM Dr. Kildare films ====
- Young Dr. Kildare (1938), which introduced Lew Ayres as Dr. Kildare and Lionel Barrymore as Dr. Gillespie
- Calling Dr. Kildare (1939)
- The Secret of Dr. Kildare (1939)
- Dr. Kildare's Strange Case (1940)
- Dr. Kildare Goes Home (1940)
- Dr. Kildare's Crisis (1940)
- The People vs. Dr. Kildare (1941) – the last film made with the collaboration of series creator Frederick Schiller Faust (Max Brand)
- Dr. Kildare's Wedding Day (1941)
- Dr. Kildare's Victory (1942)

==== MGM Dr. Gillespie films ====
- Calling Dr. Gillespie (1942), with Dr. John Hunter Gerniede (Philip Dorn) replacing the character of Dr. Kildare (Ayres), who was retired from the series
- Dr. Gillespie's New Assistant (1942), which introduced Gillespie's new assistants Dr. Randall "Red" Adams (Van Johnson) and Dr. Lee Wong How (Keye Luke)
- Dr. Gillespie's Criminal Case (1943), with Dr. Randall "Red" Adams (Johnson) and Dr. Lee Wong How (Luke)
- Three Men in White (1944), with Dr. Randall "Red" Adams (Johnson) and Dr. Lee Wong How (Luke)
- Between Two Women (1945), with Dr. Randall "Red" Adams (Johnson) and Dr. Lee Wong How (Luke)
- Dark Delusion (1947), with Dr. Tommy Coalt (James Craig) (replacing Johnson's character) and Dr. Lee Wong How (Luke)

=== Home media ===
Warner Bros. released the complete set of MGM Kildare films on DVD as the "Dr. Kildare Movie Collection" via their Warner Archive Collection in January 2014. The set also included, as an extra, the 1960 unaired pilot for the Dr. Kildare TV series starring Lew Ayres. Previously, some of the individual Kildare films had been released individually on DVD through distributors such as Alpha Video, Roan Archival Group, FilmRise and Genius Entertainment.

Warner Bros. also released the complete set of Dr. Gillespie films on DVD as the "Dr. Gillespie Movie Collection" via Warner Archive Collection in November 2014.

The single Paramount Kildare film, Internes Can't Take Money, was released on DVD by Universal as part of "The Barbara Stanwyck Collection" in April 2010.

== Radio ==
The Kildare character first appeared on radio on October 13, 1938, when Lionel Barrymore and Lew Ayres performed a scene from their soon-to-be-released film, Young Dr. Kildare, on MGM's Good News of 1939 radio program.

In the summer of 1949, MGM reunited Lew Ayres and Lionel Barrymore to record the radio series, The Story of Dr. Kildare, which used the concept and characters of the earlier Young Dr. Kildare story and did not include any of the young doctors who had replaced Kildare in the later films featuring Dr. Gillespie. By this time, Ayres had returned to public favor after serving in WWII as a medical corpsman. Episodes were scripted by James Moser, Jean Holloway, Les Crutchfield, E. Jack Neuman, John Michael Hayes, Joel Murcott, and others. The supporting cast included Ted Osborne as hospital administrator Dr. Carew, Eleanor Audley as receptionist Molly Byrd, Jane Webb as nurse Mary Lamont, and Virginia Gregg as nurse Evangeline Parker, labeled "Nosy Parker" by Gillespie. In addition, many prominent West Coast radio actors made recurring appearances, including Raymond Burr, William Conrad, Stacy Harris, Lurene Tuttle, Barton Yarborough, and Jack Webb.

Each radio episode was developed as a stand-alone program rather than a serial. Episodes typically focused on Dr. Kildare dealing with a particular medical issue while jousting with eccentric patients and/or hospital administrators. The medical information presented was up to date for its time, and sometimes taken from real life; for example, an episode in which Dr. Kildare is forced to perform an emergency appendectomy on himself was based on a news story. At least 60 half-hour episodes were produced.

In addition to airing on the MGM-affiliated New York station WMGM, The Story of Dr. Kildare was originally syndicated to over 200 outlets in the U.S. and Canada, mostly Mutual Broadcasting System stations. The earliest known broadcast of the program took place on September 27, 1949, on Mutual station WGN in Chicago, prior to the WMGM premiere episode on October 12, 1949. In the early 1950s, MGM offered the show to stations as part of a multiple-program package for a price lower than purchasing each program individually. However, starting in 1952, stations began to lose interest in such packages, preferring to develop their own local programming to better compete with television. Consequently, despite the show's popularity with audiences, no new episodes of The Story of Dr. Kildare were produced after 1951, although rebroadcasts of old episodes continued to air in syndication for several more years.

== Television ==
=== Dr. Kildare (1950s) ===
In 1953, Lew Ayres was approached to star in a Dr. Kildare television series, which would feature an older Kildare having finally taken over the practice of a retired Dr. Gillespie. After two pilots were filmed, Ayres refused to work further on the project unless the television studio refused to allow cigarette companies to sponsor the program. Ayres later explained, "My feeling was that a medical show, particularly one that might appeal to children, should not be used to sell cigarettes." The studio would not agree to reject lucrative advertising, so the project was abandoned.

=== Dr. Kildare (1960s) ===
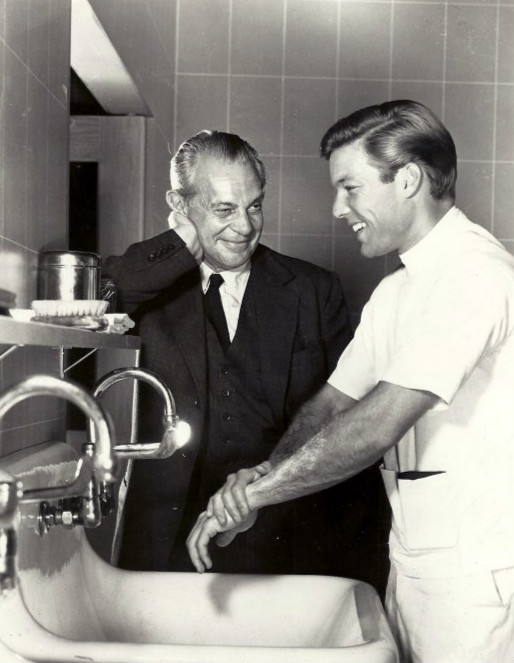
Raymond Massey as Dr. Gillespie and Richard Chamberlain as Dr. Kildare, in the 1961 Dr. Kildare television series

Lew Ayres reprised his role as Dr. Kildare in an unsold and unaired 1960 TV pilot directed by John Newland (with Joe Cronin as Dr. Grayson)

The second attempt at a Kildare TV show premiered on September 28, 1961. The series was a top-10 hit with audiences and ran until April 5, 1966, for a total of 191 episodes in five seasons. The first two seasons told the story of Dr. James Kildare (Richard Chamberlain), working in a fictional large metropolitan hospital while trying to learn his profession, deal with his patients' problems, and earn the respect of the senior Dr. Leonard Gillespie (Raymond Massey). In the third season, Dr. Kildare was promoted to resident and the series began to focus more on the stories of the patients and their families. The success of the show (along with ABC's contemporaneous medical drama Ben Casey) inspired the launch of numerous other television medical dramas in the ensuing years.

=== Young Dr. Kildare (1970s) ===
In 1972, MGM Television created a short-lived syndicated drama series called Young Dr. Kildare, starring Mark Jenkins as Dr. James Kildare and Gary Merrill as Dr. Leonard Gillespie. The series was not a success, and only 24 episodes were produced.

== Comics ==
From 1962 to 1965, Dell Comics published a Dr. Kildare comic book based on the 1960s Dr. Kildare television series. The first issue was released April 2, 1962, as No. 1337 in Dell's Four Color Comics line, and featured a story involving a gambler checking into Dr. Kildare's hospital to hide from a hit man. Dell subsequently continued the comic book for a total of nine issues, with the final issue appearing in April 1965. All issues had photo covers featuring Chamberlain, the star of the TV series.

A Dr. Kildare daily comic strip based on the 1960s television series, distributed by King Features Syndicate, and drawn by Ken Bald also premiered on October 15, 1962. Bald was required to base his drawing of Dr. Kildare on photos of Richard Chamberlain, but made up his own drawings of other characters, including Dr. Gillespie. The daily strip, drawn by Bald, ran for over two decades until April 21, 1984, outlasting the television series (which was cancelled in 1966) by nearly 18 years. A Sunday strip also ran from April 19, 1964, to April 3, 1983. Bald retired after the cancellation of the daily strip.

== Franchise rights ==
The underlying rights to the Kildare film and television franchise are owned by Warner Bros. (via Turner Entertainment Co.), with the exception of the 1937 film Internes Can't Take Money, currently owned by EMKA, Ltd./Universal Television, keeper of Paramount Pictures' pre-1950 sound library.

== See also ==
- Doctor (novel series), a British dramatic comedy series of novels, films, and serialized television programs
- List of fictional doctors
- List of medical drama television programs
- Medical drama
