= Wesley Addy =

American actor (1913–1996)

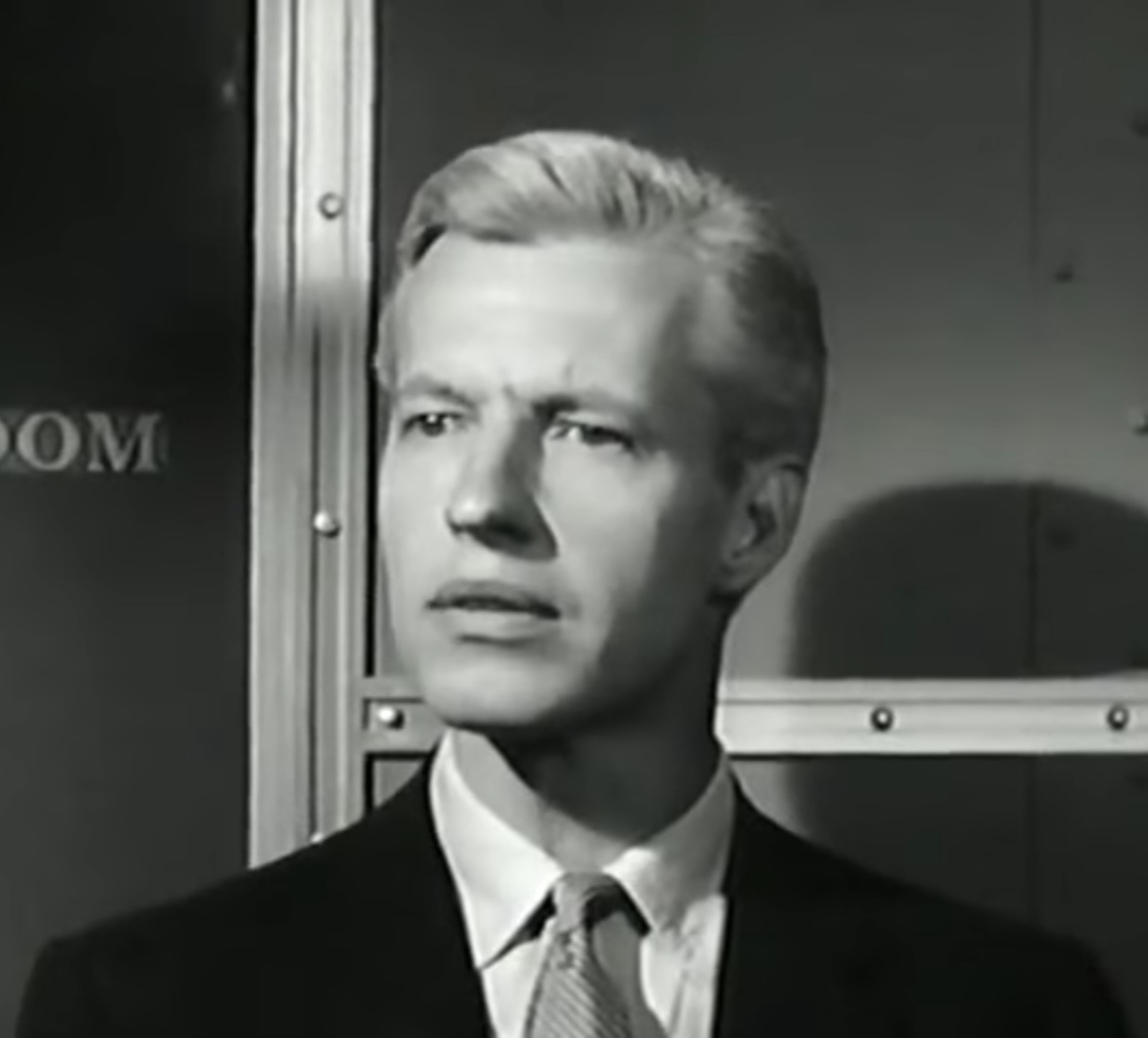
- Addy in Time Table (1956)
- Born: Robert Wesley Addy; August 4, 1913; Omaha, Nebraska, U.S.
- Died: December 31, 1996 (aged 83); Danbury, Connecticut, U.S.
- Other name: Wes Addy
- Education: University of California, Los Angeles
- Occupation: Actor
- Years active: 1934–1996
- Spouse: Celeste Holm (m. 1966)
- Military career
- Allegiance: United States
- Branch: U.S. Army
- Service years: 1941–1946
- Rank: Major
- Service number: 32160982
- Unit: 63rd Infantry Division
- Conflicts: World War II

Robert Wesley Addy (August 4, 1913 – December 31, 1996) was an American actor of stage, television, and film.

== Early life ==
Addy was born in Omaha, Nebraska, the second child and only son of John Roy Addy, a minister, and his Danish-born wife, Maren S. Nelson, a nurse. The family had come from Ohio, where Addy's father and older sister were born. The parents were recruited as missionaries bound for China, but his father suffered a nervous breakdown on the way, and the family wound up in Inglewood, California. Addy attended Inglewood Union High School, where he played the oboe. He graduated high school in January 1930.

Addy entered UCLA as an economics major during the spring quarter of 1930, but switched to dramatics after his freshman year. He was active in the university's Dramatic Society from his sophomore year. During his junior year he played Orestes in Choephoroe, drawing praise from the Los Angeles Times drama critic. While a senior, he played Sebastian in Shakespeare's Twelfth Night, and the Earl of Essex in Elizabeth the Queen with a cast that included classmates Lloyd Bridges and Russell Zink. Addy also reprised his performance of Orestes, this time in Eumenides.

== Pre-war stage career ==
After graduating from UCLA, Addy moved to the East Coast at the invitation of a family friend, Phidelah Rice, who owned a theater on Martha's Vineyard. He joined the Vineyard Player's summer stock company, which performed at the Rice Playhouse. Though obscure, it was a professional company which likely secured for Addy his first Equity card.

=== Panic and Hamlet ===
His first Broadway theatre credit came in March 1935 with Panic. Directed by John Houseman, the production starred a very young Orson Welles, with Richard Whorf, Paula Trueman, Abner Biberman, and Karl Swenson in supporting roles. Addy had two minor bits, as one of the Unemployed in the Depression-themed work, and as a male chorus member under the direction of Martha Graham. His second Broadway credit was a short-lived fey drama called How Beautiful with Shoes for which he had a minor bit.

Addy then worked at smaller theatres in the outlying New York City area, featuring with Ruth Gordon in a revival of Maxwell Anderson's Saturday's Children, and following it with Fresh Fields His first break came with There's Always Juliet, a Federal Theatre revival production. With only two principals and two minor characters in the work, Addy received prominent attention from the critics, particularly since he joined the cast at the last moment, replacing the leading male. (Note: The programs had already been printed with the other actor's name, so Addy's was inserted by hand.)

When John Houseman was asked to help direct Leslie Howard's production of Hamlet, he remembered Addy from Panic and suggested him for the role of Marcellus. After a week's tryout in Boston, it moved to the Imperial Theatre on Broadway in November 1936, where Addy picked up the additional role of Fortinbras. Directed by Houseman, with the internal play staged by Agnes de Mille, Howard's portrayal suffered from comparison with the more traditional version of John Gielgud, then running at the Empire Theatre. The production went on the road to Chicago after 39 performances, touring for nine weeks until finishing up in San Francisco in February 1937.

=== Richard II and Henry IV, Part 1 ===
His next known performance was in Richard II, which returned to Broadway during September 1937 after a hiatus for the summer months. Addy replaced another actor in two minor roles for this production staged by Margaret Webster that starred Maurice Evans. After a month back on Broadway, the production went to Boston then to Philadelphia.

While still playing in Richard II, Addy began rehearsals for King Henry IV, Part 1, in which he would play Hotspur. Two tryout performances were given in Philadelphia during December 1937, with Maurice Evans as Falstaff. Critic Linton Martin of The Philadelphia Inquirer was impressed with Addy's performance:

...Wesley Addy as the hot-blooded Hotspur, headlong, heroic and humorous, came perilously close to stealing the show during his vivid and vigorous appearances.

After Richard II continued on to Detroit, two more tryouts of Henry IV, Part I were presented, where again Addy's Hotspur drew praise second only to Evans' Falstaff. The pattern was repeated in St. Louis and Chicago as the Richard II tour finished up in March 1938.

For unknown reasons, Evans and Webster decided against taking Henry IV, Part 1 to Broadway in 1938. A rumor appeared in newspapers that Evans was not happy with Addy's acclaim, but one critic pointed out that American theatregoers, unfamiliar with English history and the larger Henriad, assumed Hotspur was the hero of the play and reacted negatively to his death.

=== Hamlet again ===
Addy next appeared in summer stock with the Surry Players in rural Surry, Maine. This was a self-contained "colony" troupe with its own theatre, which provided housing and meals for its cast members, and offered them dancing and fencing instruction. Here Addy performed in four plays during the summer of 1938, while frustrating a local journalist's attempt to get him to open up about himself:

[There's] nothing to tell... I was graduated from the University of California in 1934 and went right to a stock company on Martha's Vineyard, without even waiting for my diploma – and I've been in the theater more or less ever since.

Back on Broadway for the fall season, he played in Evans and Webster's production of Hamlet from October 1938 thru January 1939, at which time they finally decided to mount Henry IV, Part 1. Addy again played Hotspur, to high praise from the reviewers:

Otherwise the performance of the evening is that of Wesley Addy playing Hotspur with such a fine and youthful enthusiasm, and with so determined and understanding a belief in the character, as to score with every scene he has.

Summer stock at the Paper Mill Playhouse in Millburn, New Jersey occupied Addy during August and September 1939, however his only known role was in a world premiere of Flight Into China by Pearl S. Buck. He returned to Broadway in November 1939 with Summer Night by Vicki Baum and Benjamin Glazer. Directed by Lee Strasberg with a good cast, the play was critically panned for the writing, which sought to present a Grand Hotel story in the setting of a summer park where a marathon dance is taking place. It closed after just four performances. Flops project an aura onto their unlucky participants; it was five months before Addy found another stage job.

=== Romeo and Juliet ===
At the time of the 1940 US Census in April, Addy was temporarily staying at a boarding house in San Francisco. Laurence Olivier was producing, directing, and starring in Romeo and Juliet, with Vivien Leigh as his co-star; (Note: They had each recently divorced their spouses but would not marry until August 1940.) the opening tryout was at the Geary Theater in San Francisco. Addy, playing Benvolio, performed in the week-long tryouts in San Francisco and Chicago. Oakland Tribune reviewer Wood Soanes praised the supporting cast, including Addy, but found the two stars underwhelming. Cecil Smith of the Chicago Tribune also thought Addy excellent, but was more nuanced about Olivier and Leigh.

The production went to Broadway on May 9, 1940, at the 51st Street Theater. Addy alone drew praise from critic Arthur Pollock, who was scathing about the two stars and Edmond O'Brien as Mercutio. Reviewer Burns Mantle called Addy and few others "outstanding", but also expressed disappointment with Olivier and Leigh. The production closed in early June 1940 after 36 performances.

=== Twelfth Night and Battle of Angels ===
After doing some summer stock in Locust Valley, New York and Stockbridge, Massachusetts, Addy was cast in a Theatre Guild production of Twelfth Night when Robert Speaight was called up for wartime service in the UK. This was another Maurice Evans and Margaret Webster collaboration, with Helen Hayes playing Viola and Addy as Orsino.

Though Addy had taken the role of Orsino at short notice, and performed more than creditably, he was to leave it in mid-December 1940. The Theatre Guild had a new work, Battle of Angels, by a then unknown playwright named Tennessee Williams. The play had a leading lady, Miriam Hopkins, but no male lead. Already regarded as a difficult script, (Note: In his memoir Magic Curtain (1951), Lawrence Langner says Hopkins became so frustrated with it she threw her copy at him.) both the Theatre Guild (specifically Lawrence Langner and Theresa Helburn) and Hopkins settled on Addy "after weeks of desperate searching" and shortly before the scheduled tryout in Boston. Lauren Gilbert took over the role of Orsino in Twelfth Night when Addy signed for Battle of Angels.

The tryout for Battle of Angels opened at the Wilbur Theatre on December 30, 1940, under the direction of Margaret Webster. Initial reviews praised the acting of Hopkins and Addy, but said they were unable to overcome severe problems with the writing: "the play gives the audience the sensation of having been dunked in mire". Boston city officials demanded certain lines be dropped or the play would be closed; Hopkins blasted them for having small minds and praised Williams' writing, but the Theatre Guild decided to shut it down on January 11, 1941.

Having given up a surefire Broadway role for a lead in a brief beleaguered disappointment, Addy was now unemployed. Scant compensation came from columnist George Ross, who noted how successfully Addy had jumped into last-minute roles for Twelfth Night and Battle of Angels. The Theatre Guild found him work in Somewhere in France, which had a preview at the Guild Theatre during late April 1941. It then went to the National Theatre for a tryout run, during which the Theatre Guild announced it would be set aside until the fall for rewrites, by which time Addy had enlisted in the US Army.

== Recordings, radio, and early television ==
In a 1939 profile by columnist Robert Francis, Addy revealed that he spent mornings at the American Foundation for the Blind (AFB), making recordings of plays for their talking book program. He would continue this activity up until he entered military service in 1941.

Addy also used his fine speaking voice for radio programs. While still playing Hotspur on Broadway in March 1939, he also starred in an afternoon WJZ production of Cyrano de Bergerac for its "Great Plays" series, with Martha Scott as his Roxanne. He and Mady Christians took the leads for another "Great Plays" episode in May 1939, this one for Elizabeth the Queen. During November 1939 he played the lead in "Great Plays" version of Romeo and Juliet on WJZ, with Joan Tompkins as his Juliet.

On March 8, 1941, Addy temporarily took over the lead in an hour-long dramatic serial on CBS Radio, Honest Abe, replacing Ray Middleton. The serial aired Saturday mornings and co-starred Muriel Kirkland. Addy's tenure ended one month later, when Henry Hull took over the part. On May 4, 1941, Addy did another "Great Plays" radio program, Prologue to Glory, where he played young Abe Lincoln.

Addy's first known screen performance came from an hour-long production of Noël Coward's Hay Fever on New York experimental television. Broadcast on July 27, 1939, on W2XBS, it also featured Isobel Elsom and Dennis Hoey.

== Military service ==
During October 1940, Addy registered for the draft, listing his employer as the Theatre Guild (he had just been cast in Twelfth Night). The registrar recorded him as being 6 ft 1 in (185 cm), 160 pounds (73 kg), with blue eyes and blond hair. On July 16, 1941, he enlisted in the U.S. Army at Camp Upton in Yaphank, New York.

The usual disposition of someone with Addy's background would be assignment to one of the specialized units attached to the Signal Corps. However, it appears he wound up as an officer in the 63rd Infantry Division during the Second World War, and was a Major while on terminal leave from the army during February 1946.

== Post-war stage career ==
=== Antigone and Candida ===
The first post-war mention of Addy resuming his performing career comes from February 1946, when he again took over a role on short notice. The play was Antigone and the Tyrant, produced by and starring Katharine Cornell, and directed by her husband Guthrie McClintic. Addy replaced James Monks in the role of Haemon midway through a two-week tryout run in Boston. The production went to Broadway's Cort Theatre on February 18, 1946. Cedric Hardwicke played Creon in this adaption by Lewis Galantière of Jean Anouilh's version of the Greek classic, updated with modern slang, tuxedos, cigarettes, and policemen. Beginning April 4, 1946, this play started alternating at the Cort Theatre with a revival of Candida, again produced by Cornell and staged by McClintic. Candida starred Cornell as the title character, Hardwicke as her father Burgess, with Addy as her husband Rev. Morell, and Marlon Brando playing her suitor Marchbanks. Addy was considered too young for the role, but "being a good actor, makes a good acting job of it". Both productions closed on Broadway during early May 1946 to go on a brief tour, first to Washington, D.C. then finishing in Chicago in early June.

While still playing in both Cornell productions, Addy did a Sunday evening radio broadcast for the Theater Guild of Mary of Scotland on April 28, 1946. Helen Hayes and Helen Menken reprised their 1933 Broadway roles as Mary Stuart and Elizabeth Tudor respectively.

=== Another Part of the Forest ===
Addy next turns up as a replacement for Leo Genn in the original Broadway production of Another Part of the Forest in March 1947, finishing the last 10 weeks of its six-month run. He did some summer stock in Ridgefield, Connecticut during June–July 1947 then picked up with the touring company of Another Part of the Forest in late September 1947. This month-long tour took in Philadelphia, Indianapolis, and Chicago, and like the Broadway production was directed by the playwright, Lillian Hellman. Corbin Patrick of The Indianapolis Star felt Addy dominated the performance. Claudia Cassidy of the Chicago Tribune also thought Addy's was the driving force, though she emphasized his discretion rather than his power. (Note: Cassidy also pointed out the psychological aspects of the play, and almost as an aside, mentioned that Hellman's photo, rather than one of the performers, was on the cover of the Playbill program.)

The Experimental Theatre, a project of the American National Theater and Academy, opened its second season with a one-week production of Galileo at Maxine Elliott's Theatre during December 1947,. It starred Charles Laughton, with Addy, John Carradine, Joan McCracken, and Hester Sondergaard as the other New York leads. Addy's next performing work was a small part in a Theatre Guild radio broadcast of Romeo and Juliet during February 1948. He followed it a month later with the speaking role in a performance of Oedipus rex by the Boston Symphony Orchestra. That summer of 1948 Addy played Iago in a week-long Boston production of Othello that starred Canada Lee as Othello and Claire Luce as Desdemona. He also reprised his role in Oedipus rex and narrated Peter and the Wolf when the Boston Symphony Orchestra gave performances at Tanglewood during August 1948. Both performances were broadcast over ABC radio.

=== The Leading Lady and The Traitor ===
The world premiere of The Leading Lady was at the Selwyn Theatre in Chicago on Sept. 13, 1948. Ruth Gordon starred in the play she had written, with her husband Garson Kanin directing. The Chicago Tribune critic liked it, though she thought the part handed to Addy was nebulous, and suggested the second and third acts needed work during the three week tryout. After revisions, the producers agreed to a second tryout, scheduled for two weeks in Boston at the Copley Theatre. Addy's role may have been strengthened, for the Boston reviewer praised his performance, even while suggesting the play relied too much on "character vignettes" and theatrical in-jokes, such as John Carradine's portrayal of a theatre critic ala Aleck Woollcott. The Leading Lady opened at Broadway's National Theatre on October 18, 1948, was judged to be a "charade" rather than a play, and closed after just eight performances.

Addy did another speaking role with the Boston Symphony Orchestra in January 1949, narrating A Lincoln Portrait by Aaron Copland. He was then to appear in an Equity Library Theatre production of A Highland Fling but left the cast when signed for a part in The Traitor, a new play by Herman Wouk. Produced and staged by the mercurial Jed Harris who disdained tryouts, it had only two performances in Princeton, New Jersey before opening on Broadway on March 31, 1949. Critic John Chapman called it "a bit more than plain melodrama", pointing to the ethical debates between Addy's and Walter Hampden's characters, and pronounced it thoroughly enjoyable. It ran for 67 performances, a respectable showing but disappointing in light of the good reviews.

Addy did a Theatre Guild on the Air radio broadcast during October 1949 of an Arthur Wing Pinero play, The Thunderbolt, which starred Van Heflin and Celeste Holm. He was then cast in The Enchanted, which opened in Philadelphia for a two-week tryout on January 2, 1950. The play moved to Broadway on January 18, 1950, where critics praised the acting but faulted the play's structure and staging. It closed a month later in February 1950, from which point on Addy's career momentum shifted to the screen.

== Early screen career ==
=== 1949-1953 ===
New York was the center for early television production, which is why Addy appeared first on the small screen. His post-war screen career started with a live broadcast of Twelfth Night, in which he again played Duke Orsino, on The Philco Television Playhouse during February 1949. He did another live episode of the same program in September 1949, this time as "John Shand" to Margaret Phillips "Maggie Wylie" in What Every Woman Knows.

During 1950 Addy did episodes of The Chevrolet Tele-Theatre, Believe It or Not!, and two episodes each for Suspense and The Ford Theatre Hour. He also made a debut film, The First Legion, though it wouldn't be released until 1951.

Addy opened as Edgar in King Lear on Christmas Day 1950. The Broadway production starred Louis Calhern, and was staged by John Houseman in three acts instead of five. Columnist Leonard Lyons mentioned that Addy was "taped and bandaged" from the nightly duels he fought in King Lear, his character being the last man standing at play's end. The play closed in early February 1951 after 48 performances.

For 1951 television again dominated Addy's performing work, as he acted in six episodes of five different dramatic series: The Philco Television Playhouse (2 episodes), The Web, Ellery Queen, Out There, and Celanese Theatre. He also appeared on a CBS television talk show and joined Katherine Cornell in reprising their roles in Candida for a Theatre Guild NBC radio broadcast.

Addy's television work took a slight dip in 1952, comprising appearances on two anthology series and two episodes of a narrative series. He also did two CBS Radio dramatic programs. He continued doing dramatic radio programs for CBS, one serial and one anthology. His performing year finished up with a stage benefit to raise funds for the American Shakespeare Theatre project.

Fifteen television performances and a Broadway play kept Addy busy throughout 1953. His schedule was front-loaded, with six TV shows within the first three months of the year. The month of April was particularly crowded, with an anthology episode and two major Hallmark Hall of Fame dramas: a hourlong film based on The Other Wise Man and broadcast on Easter; and a live two-hour performance of Hamlet. The latter was staged in a 19th Century setting by Albert McCleery, and starred Maurice Evans, with Sarah Churchill, Barry Jones, Joseph Schildkraut, and Ruth Chatterton. Addy played Horatio opposite Evans's Prince Hamlet. Leo Mishkin reviewed the performance for The Philadelphia Inquirer; he noted that the Gravedigger's scene and the role of Fortinbras were cut for time considerations. He also reported some flaws endemic to live television, such as a stagehand following Hamlet into camera view, but thought the overall production was excellent and Addy "highly effective". Critic Robert Johnson thought Addy and other supporting players "outstanding" while observing the two-hours included both commercials and an intermission, necessitating drastic cuts such as the role of Osric and much of Rosenkrantz and Guildenstern.

Addy did two television episodes over the summer then joined the cast of The Strong Are Lonely during its Philadelphia tryout in late September 1953. This story of Jesuits in conflict with landowners in 19th Century Paraguay went to Broadway but folded after seven performances. Addy then jumped into another major TV drama, a severely condensed version of King Lear starring Orson Welles that was shown live during October 1953. He finished out his performing year with three more television appearances.

== Later screen career ==
Also on television he played roles on The Edge of Night in the 1950s. He made two guest appearances on Perry Mason: Alton Brent in the 1962 episode, "The Case of the Weary Watchdog", and murderer Joachim DeVry in the 1966 episode, "The Case of the Tsarina's Tiara." Later, during the 1970s-1980s, he played publisher Bill Woodard on Ryan's Hope and patriarch Cabot Alden on the Agnes Nixon-Douglas Marland serial Loving. His television career also includes guest appearances on The Defenders, The Outer Limits, The Fugitive, Ironside, and The Rockford Files.

In motion pictures, Addy's career spanned four decades. Robert Aldrich used him as supporting actor in several pictures, such as Kiss Me Deadly (as Mickey Spillane's regular Mike Hammer character Lt. Pat Murphy), The Big Knife (both 1955), What Ever Happened to Baby Jane? (1962), Hush...Hush, Sweet Charlotte (1964) and The Grissom Gang (1971). In 1976, Addy appeared in Paddy Chayefsky's Network, directed by Sidney Lumet. They would work together again in The Verdict, in which Addy played one of the individual defendants in Paul Newman's case against a hospital and two doctors for malpractice. Another of Addy's best-remembered roles was that of Lt. Commander Alvin Kramer, who unsuccessfully tries to warn American officials of the impending attack on Pearl Harbor in Tora! Tora! Tora!. He was in The Heat of the Night (https://www.imdb.com/title/tt0094484/characters/nm0011741)

== Death ==
Addy died at Danbury Hospital in Danbury, Connecticut. He was cremated at Ferncliff Cemetery.

== Personal life ==
He was married to actress Celeste Holm from 1966 until his death. The couple lived at 88 Central Park West in Manhattan then in Washington Township, Morris County, New Jersey.

== Stage performances ==
Year	Play	Role	Venue	Notes
1935	Panic	Unemployed/Male Chorus	Imperial Theatre	Not a bad debut for Addy, playing alongside Orson Welles with choreography by Martha Graham
1935	How Beautiful with Shoes	Wedding Guest	Booth Theatre	Just 8 performances for this urban take on rural angst
1936	Saturday's Children		New Rochelle Playhouse	Ruth Gordon starred in this revival of Maxwell Anderson's 1927 play
1936	Fresh Fields		Cedarhurst Playhouse	This was a Federal Theatre sponsored production on Long Island, New York.
1936	There's Always Juliet	Dwight Houston	Cedarhurst Playhouse	Another Federal Theatre production, Addy's co-star was Ellen Emery.
1936	Hamlet	Marcellus/ Fortinbras	Boston Opera House; Imperial Theatre; Touring Company	Leads were Leslie Howard, Pamela Stanley, Wilfred Walter, Mary Servoss, Aubrey Mather, and Clifford Evans
1937	King Richard II	Earl of Salisbury/ Keeper of Prison	St. James Theatre; Touring Company	Addy replaced Lionel Ince from the earlier run on Broadway (Feb 1937-Jun 1937)
1937	Henry IV, Part 1	Hotspur	Touring Company	Addy drew strong praise from tryout performances in Philadelphia, Detroit, St. Louis, and Chicago.
1938	Liliom	Wolf Beifeld	Surry Theatre	Shepperd Strudwick starred, with Katherine Emery, Helen Wynn, Anne Revere and Lester Damon
1938	Hedda Gabler	Eilert Lövborg	Surry Theatre	Anne Revere starred, with Robert Allen, Lester Damon, Katherine Emery, and Helen Wynn
1938	The Distaff Side	Gilbert Baize	Surry Theatre	Katherine Emery starred, with Margaret Clifford, Anne Driscoll, and Helen Wynn.
1938	The Good Hope	Bos	Surry Theatre	Addy co-starred with Anne Revere, Shepperd Strudwick, and Katherine Emery
1938	Hamlet	Bernardo/ Fortinbras	St. James Theatre	From Oct 1938 thru Jan 1939; this was the five-hour complete version, starring Maurice Evans as Hamlet
1939	Henry IV, Part 1	Hotspur	St. James Theatre	Starring Maurice Evans as Falstaff, with Edmond O'Brien, Mady Christians, Donald Randolph, Carmen Mathews, Irene Tedrow, William Prince, Alexander Scourby
1939	Flight into China		Paper Mill Playhouse	Addy had the lead in this premiere by Pearl S. Buck about Jewish refugees in China. With Zita Johann, Uta Hagen, Thelma Schnee, Tonio Selwart, and José Ferrer.
1939	Summer Night	Melvyn Lockhart	St. James Theatre	Despite a good cast and director, the play was critically panned. With Louis Calhern, Helen Flint, Violet Heming, Gage Clarke, and Howard Da Silva
1940	Romeo and Juliet	Benvolio	Geary Theatre (SF); Auditorium Theater (Chicago); 51st Street Theater	Starred Laurence Olivier and Vivien Leigh, with May Whitty, Ben Webster, Edmond O'Brien, Alexander Knox, Halliwell Hobbes, Wilton Graff, Cornel Wilde, and Katherine Warren.
1940	The Constant Nymph	Lewis Dodd	Red Barn Theatre	Summer stock in Locust Valley, New York. Addy's co-stars were Greta Maren and Anne Revere.
1940	In My Opinion		Berkshire Playhouse	Premiere in Stockbridge, Massachusetts. Addy's co-stars were Kent Smith and Rachel Adams, with Whit Bissell, Adrienne Marden, and Lewis Martin.
1940	Twelfth Night	Orsino	St. James Theatre	Theatre Guild production, starring Maurice Evans and Helen Hayes, with Sophie Stewart, Mark Smith, June Walker, and Wallace Acton.
1940	Battle of Angels	Valentine Xavier	Wilbur Theatre	Addy and Miriam Hopkins starred, with Robert Emhardt, Dorothy Peterson, Marshall Bradford, Doris Dudley, and Edith King.
1941	Somewhere in France	Andre Marignac	Guild Theatre; National Theatre	Dudley Digges starred, with Karen Morley, Alexander Knox, Flora Campbell, Walter Slezak, Arlene Francis, Kathryn Givney, Clay Clement, and Art Smith.
1946	Antigone and the Tyrant (Note: Some contemporary newspaper reviewers (and IBDB today) gave the name as just Antigone)	Haemon	Wilbur Theatre; Cort Theatre; National Theatre; Harris Theatre	Katharine Cornell and Cedric Hardwicke starred, with Hoarce Braham, Bertha Belmore, Ruth Matteson, George Mathews, David J. Stewart, Michael Higgins, Oliver Cliff
1946	Candida	Rev. James Morell	Cort Theatre; National Theatre; Harris Theatre	Cornell and Hardwicke starred, with Mildred Natwick, Marlon Brando, and Oliver Cliff
1947	Another Part of the Forest	Benjamin Hubbard	Fulton Theatre	Starred Patricia Neal, Scott McKay, and Percy Waram, with Mildred Dunnock, Margaret Phillips, Jean Hagen, and Hugh Reilly.
1947	Rip Van Winkle		Summer Theatre	Summer stock in Ridgefield, Connecticut, with Reynolds Evans and Joanna Roos.
1947	Another Part of the Forest	Benjamin Hubbard	Walnut Theatre; English Theatre; Erlanger Theatre	The tour had the same leads as Broadway save for Carl Benton Reid replacing Percy Waram.
1947	Galileo	Old Cardinal	Maxine Elliott's Theatre	Directed by Joseph Losey, it starred Charles Laughton, with John Carradine, Hester Sondergaard, and Joan McCracken.
1948	Othello	Iago	Boston Summer Theatre (Note: This was the production company, the actual venue was in a building known as New England Mutual Hall.)	Staged by Henry Jones, it starred Canada Lee and Claire Luce, with Ernest Graves, Kurt Richards, Constance Moorehead, and Lorraine McMartin.
1948	The Leading Lady	Harry	Selwyn Theatre (Chicago); Copley Theatre (Boston); National Theatre	Ruth Gordon wrote and starred, Garson Kanin directed. With Ian Keith, John Carradine, Mildred Dunnock, Ethel Griffies, William J. Kelly, James MacColl, Ossie Davis, and Douglass Watson.
1949	The Traitor	Prof. Allen Carr	McCarter Theatre; 48th Street Theatre	Staged by Jed Harris, starred Lee Tracy and Walter Hampden, with Louise Platt, Richard Derr, and John Wengraf.
1950	The Enchanted	The Supervisor	Walnut Street Theatre; Lyceum	Staged by George S. Kaufman, starred Leueen MacGrath, Malcolm Keen, Charles Halton, Una O'Connor, and Russell Collins.
1950	King Lear	Edgar	National Theatre	Staged by John Houseman, starred Louis Calhern, with Edith Atwater, Nina Foch, Norman Lloyd, Joseph Wiseman, Nehemiah Persoff, and Jo Van Fleet.
1952	An Evening with Will Shakespeare	(various readings)	New Parsons Theater	Staged and narrated by Margaret Webster, with Claude Rains, Eve Le Gallienne, Lueen MacGrath, Nina Foch, Staats Cotsworth, Faye Emerson, Arnold Moss, and Richard Dyer-Bennet.
1953	The Strong Are Lonely	Laudislos Oros, S.J.	Broadhurst Theatre	Staged by Margaret Webster,

== Radio performances ==
Listed in original broadcast order
Year	Show	Episode	Role	Notes
1939	Great Plays	Cyrano de Bergerac	Cyrano	With Martha Scott
1939	Great Plays	Elizabeth the Queen	Earl of Essex	Mady Christians starred as Elizabeth I.
1939	Great Plays	Romeo and Juliet	Romeo	Joan Tompkins played Juliet.
1941	Honest Abe	(4 episodes)	Abe Lincoln	Weekly CBS radio serial; Addy filled in for a month.
1941	Great Plays	Prologue to Glory	Abe Lincoln	
1946	Theatre Guild on the Air	Mary of Scotland		NBC Radio broadcast with Helen Hayes and Helen Menken reprising their 1933 Broadway roles.
1948	Theatre Guild on the Air	Romeo and Juliet		NBC Radio;
1948	Tanglewood Festival Special	Oedipus rex	Speaker	Live performance with Boston Symphony Orchestra, carried on ABC Radio
1948	Tanglewood Festival Special	Peter and the Wolf	Narrator	Live performance with Boston Symphony Orchestra, carried on ABC Radio
1949	The Ave Maria Hour	Francis Thompson		Likely done pro bono, it also featured Earnest Graves, Uta Hagen, and Charles Warburten.
1949	Theatre Guild on the Air	The Thunderbolt		NBC radio; Celeste Holm and Van Heflin starred, with E. G. Marshall, Ruth Hammond, and Donald McDonald.
1950		Whither Thou Goest	Andrew Johnson	With Loretta Young
1951	Theatre Guild on the Air	Candida	Rev. Morell	NBC Radio revival of the Broadway production with Katharine Cornell, Oliver Cliff, and Brenda Forbes.
1952	Mr. and Mrs. North	Cry Wolf		CBS Radio serial starring Joseph Curtain and Alice Frost, with Santos Ortega, James Monks, and Alice Teeman.
1952	Armstrong's Theatre of Today	A Matter of Business		CBS Radio anthology story had Addy as would-be novelist bookshop owner. With Judy Parrish and Virginia Dwyer.

== Filmography ==
Film (by year of first release)
Year	Title	Role	Notes
1951	The First Legion	Father John Fulton	Addy's first film has him as former concert pianist turned Jesuit priest.
1952	My Six Convicts		Uncredited bit part according to IMDb
1955	Kiss Me Deadly	Lt. Pat Murphy	
1955	The Big Knife	Horatio "Hank" Teagle	
1956	Time Table	Dr. Paul Brucker	
1957	The Garment Jungle	Mr. Paul	
1959	Ten Seconds to Hell	Wolfgang Sulke	
1962	What Ever Happened to Baby Jane?	Marty McDonald	
1963	4 for Texas	Winthrop Trowbridge	
1964	Hush...Hush, Sweet Charlotte	Sheriff Luke Standish	
1966	Seconds	John	
1966	Mister Buddwing	Dice Player #1	
1970	Tora! Tora! Tora!	Lt. Cmdr. Alvin D. Kramer	
1971	The Grissom Gang	John P. Blandish	
1976	Network	Nelson Chaney	
1977	Tail Gunner Joe	Middleton	
1979	The Europeans	Mr. Wentworth	
1982	The Verdict	Dr. Towler	
1984	The Bostonians	Dr. Tarrant	
1995	A Modern Affair	Ed Rhodes	
1996	Before and After	Judge Grady	
1996	Harvest of Fire	Bishop Levi Lapp	(final film role)

== Television performances ==
Television (in original broadcast order)
Year	Series	Episode	Role	Notes
1939	Hay Fever	(Experimental Broadcast)		Broadcast on W2XBS, with Isobel Elsom, and Dennis Hoey.
1949	The Philco Television Playhouse	Twelfth Night	Duke Orsino	Starring Marsha Hunt (Viola), with John Carradine (Malvolio), Frances Reid (Olivia), Richard Goods (Sir Toby), Vaughn Taylor (Sir Andrew), John Newland (Antonio), John McQuade (Feste), Doris Belack (Maria).
1949	The Philco Television Playhouse	What Every Woman Knows	John Shand	Margaret Phillips (Maggie), Hoarce Branham (Alick), Bill Thurnhurst (James), Bob Bolger (David), Paula Lawrence (Comtesse), Julie Bennett (Lady Sybil).
1950	The Chevrolet Tele-Theatre	The Hoosier Schoolmaster	Ralph Hartsook	Addy played a school teacher accused of robbery. With Forrest Tucker and Emily Barnes.
1950	Believe It or Not!	The Frightened City		
1950	Suspense	Poison		An English doctor in India suspects his wife (Ruth Ford).
1950	The Ford Theatre Hour	The Traitor	Prof. Allen Carr	Addy, Walter Hampden, and Lee Tracy reprised their Broadway stage roles.
1950	Suspense	Six to One Shot		Man seeks revenge on false friends. With Torin Thatcher, John Newland.
1950	The Ford Theatre Hour	The Marble Faun		With Anna Lee, Alan Shayne, Sally Chamberlin, Torin Thatcher.
1951	The Philco Television Playhouse	The Dark Corridor		Rich old woman in Victorian London trusts only her blind grandson. With Stella Andrew, Viola Roache, and Francis Compton.
1951	The Web	The Dream		Insane artist's portrait of a laughing woman causes nightmare. With Judith Parrish and Lawrence Fletcher.
1951	The Margaret Arlen Show	(1951-05-22)	Himself	CBS afternoon talk show had Addy as guest.
1951	The Philco Television Playhouse	The Spur	Edwin Booth	Adapted by Joseph Liss from Ardyth Kennelly's novel; starred Alfred Ryder as John Wilkes Booth, with Everett Chambers, Muriel Berkson, Margery Maude, and Richard Shankland.
1951	Ellery Queen	Garden of Death		Starred Lee Bowman and Florenz Ames, with Leona Maricle and Richard Purdy.
1951	Out There	The Outer Limit	Commander Xegion	Premiere episode, with Robert Webber.
1951	Celanese Theatre	The Joyeous Season	Hugh Farley	With Lillian Gish.
1952	Hallmark Hall of Fame	Reign of Terror	James Monroe	With Sarah Churchill as Elizabeth Monroe.
1952	Armstrong Circle Theatre	Cappie's Candles	Dr. Calvin Barton	Addy plays ex-Army doctor; with Katharine Bard, Floyd Buckley, and John Hamilton.
1952	The Doctor	Blackmail	Charles Miller	Addy turns to blackmail to avenge slights; with Warner Anderson, Philip Bourneuf, and Theodore Newton.
1952	The Doctor	No Story Assignment	Adam	Addy is a hard-luck reporter; with Warner Anderson, Joan Lorring, and John Alexander.
1953	The Philco Television Playhouse	Pride's Way		Shepperd Strudwick and Stella Andrew starred, with Anne Jackson, Malcolm Keen, and Don Fellows.
1953	Broadway Television Theatre	Smilin' Through	John Carteret	With William Prince and Beverly Whitney.
1953	The Doctor	The Decision		Addy is tempted to commit murder
1953	Suspense	A Study in Stone		With Roger Dann, Joan Wetmore, and Jay Barney.
1953	Short Short Dramas	The Interruption (Note: This was actually shown in two fifteen-minute parts on separate nights)	Doctor	A doctor has trouble coming to grips with his own illness.
1953	The Web	The Joke		With Berry Kroeger and Mary Sinclair.
1953	The Big Story	Theory and Practice	Edgar E. Frady	Chicago Sun-Times reporter (Addy) helps catch killer.
1953	Hallmark Hall of Fame	The Other Wise Man	Artaban	With Sarah Churchill as hostess/narrator, shown on Easter Sunday 1953 and repeated the following Sunday.
1953	Hallmark Hall of Fame	Hamlet	Horatio	Two-hour live broadcast staged by Albert McCleery, starring Maurice Evans, with Sarah Churchill, Barry Jones, Joseph Schildkraut, and Ruth Chatterton.
1953	Eye Witness	My Father's a Murderer		Stepmother (Mary Stuart) is resented by little girl (Janet Parker).
1953	The Web	The Bells of Damon		Student James Costigan challenges college dean father (Addy) over death of friend (Paul Newman) on campus.
1953	Omnibus	King Lear	King of France	Live 75 minute version starring Orson Welles focused on Lear and his daughters.
1953	Medallion Theatre	Battle Hymn		
1953	The Web	The Leech		With Beverly Whitman and Andra Lindley
1953	The Motorola Television Hour	At Ease		With Brian Donlevy, Madge Evans, Charles Dingle, and Horace McMahon.
1954	The Mail Story	(Premiere)	Doctor	Opening episode for this thirty-minute documentary drama series.
