= The Governor's Lady (disambiguation) =

The Governor's Lady is a 1912 play.

The Governor's Lady may also refer to:

- The Governor's Lady (1915 film)
- The Governor's Lady (1923 film)
