= Street Scene (play) =

1929 play written by Elmer Rice

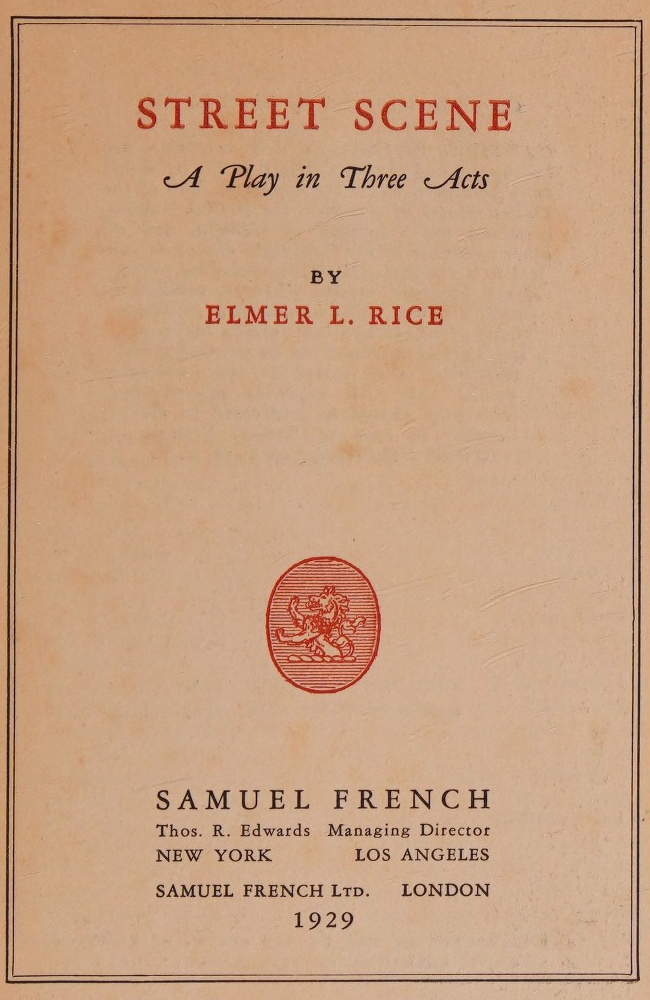
- First edition (1929)
- Original language: English
- Written by: Elmer Rice
- Characters: Anna Maurrant; Rose Maurrant; Samuel Kaplan; Frank Maurrant
- Setting: The exterior of a walk-up apartment house in New York City

Premiere
- Date: January 10, 1929
- Place: Playhouse Theatre; New York City

Street Scene is a 1929 American play by Elmer Rice. It opened January 10, 1929, at the Playhouse Theatre in New York City. After a total of 601 performances on Broadway, the production toured the United States and ran for six months in London. The action of the play takes place entirely on the front stoop of a New York City brownstone and in the adjacent street in the early part of the 20th century. It studies the complex daily lives of the people living in the building (and surrounding neighborhood) and the sense of despair that hovers over their interactions. Street Scene received the 1929 Pulitzer Prize for Drama.

== History ==
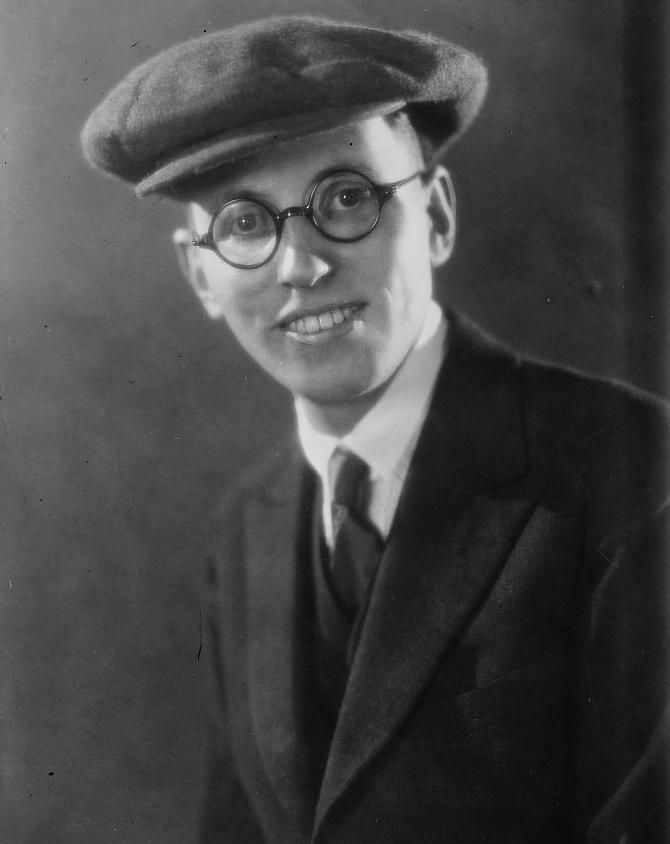
Playwright Elmer Rice

Street Scene has its origins in a play that Elmer Rice began in the mid-1920s titled Sidewalks of New York—a play without words that he wrote as a technical exercise for his own entertainment. Rice devised 15 vignettes that were a microcosm of New York life. One of these scenes presented the front of a brownstone in the early morning hours. "There was neither plot nor situation," Rice recalled. "One merely saw the house shaking off its sleep and beginning to go about the business of the day."

In the autumn of 1927, Rice returned to New York after living for almost three years in Europe, and was so taken with the vitality of the city that "almost without thinking about it" he began to reshape the brownstone-front scene into a full-length play. He began work in November 1927, addressing the play's many technical challenges—introducing some 30 characters, devising more than 75 entrances and exits in the first act alone, and making the playing of intimate scenes on a city sidewalk credible. Rice completed the play in mid-February 1928.

Street Scene was rejected by at least a dozen New York producers before it was accepted in July 1928 by Sam H. Harris. Rice's theatrical agent for this deal was Frieda Fishbein. The contract required that the play be staged by November 15; Harris' production schedule caused him to release the manuscript in October. Shortly thereafter, producer William A. Brady accepted the play. When director George Cukor walked out in the first days of rehearsal, Brady agreed to Rice directing the play himself.

== Production ==
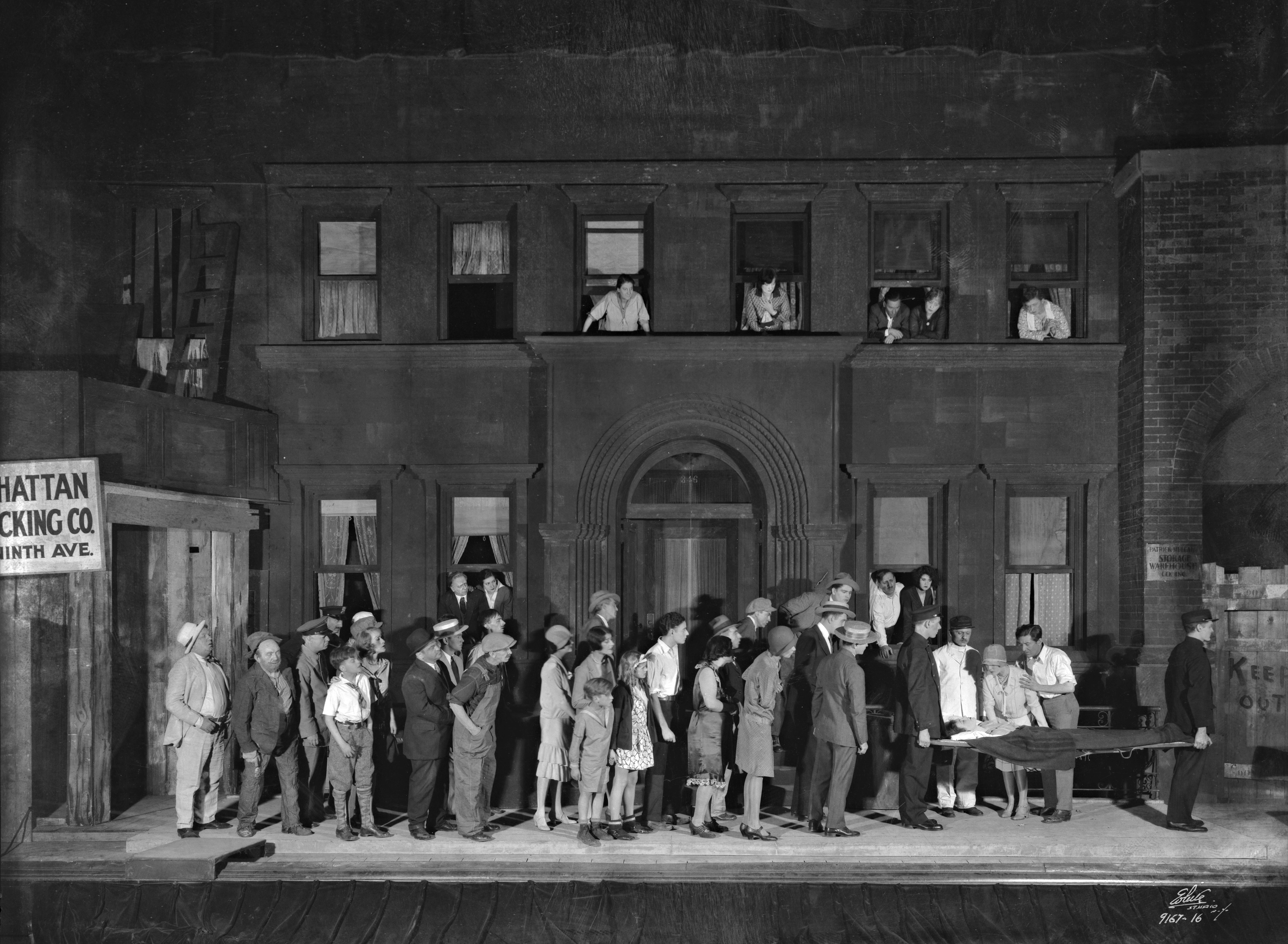
Original Broadway production of Street Scene (1929)

With settings by Jo Mielziner, Street Scene opened January 10, 1929, at the Playhouse Theatre in New York City. Rice's script indicates the play's setting is "the exterior of a 'walk-up' apartment house in a mean quarter of New York. It is of ugly brownstone." Rice was thinking of a building on West 65th Street in Manhattan while writing the play.

The main characters are Anna Maurrant, dealing with issues of infidelity; Rose Maurrant, her daughter, who struggles with the demands of her job and boss and her attraction to Jewish neighbor Sam Kaplan; Frank Maurrant, the domineering and sometimes abusive husband and father of Anna and Rose, respectively; Sam, a caring and concerned neighbor in love with Rose; and many other neighbors and passersby.

- Leo Bulgakov as Abraham Kaplan
- Eleanor Wesselhoeft as Greta Fiorentino
- Beulah Bondi as Emma Jones
- Hilda Bruce as Olga Olsen
- Russell Griffin as Willie Maurrant
- Mary Servoss as Anna Maurrant
- Conway Washburne as Daniel Buchanan
- Robert Kelly as Frank Maurrant
- T.H. Manning as George Jones
- Joseph Baird as Steve Sankey
- Jane Corcoran as Agnes Cushing
- John Qualen as Carl Olsen
- Anna Konstant as Shirley Kaplan
- George Humbert as Filippo Fiorentino
- Emily Hamill as Alice Simpson
- Frederica Going as Laura Hildebrand
- Eileen Smith as Mary Hildebrand
- Alexander Lewis as Charlie Hildebrand
- Horace Braham as Samuel Kaplan
- Erin O'Brien-Moore as Rose Maurrant
- Glenn Coulter as Harry Easter
- Millicent Green as Mae Jones
- Joseph Lee as Dick McGann
- Matthew McHugh as Vincent Jones
- John Crump as Dr. John Wilson
- Edward Downes as Officer Harry Murphy
- Ralph Willard as a Milkman
- Herbert Lindholm as a Letter-Carrier
- Samuel S. Bonnell as an Iceman and An Interne
- Mary Emerson as a Music Student
- Ellsworth Jones as Marshall James Henry
- Jean Sidney as Fred Cullen
- Joe Cogert as an Old-Clothes Man
- Anthony Pawley as an Ambulance Driver

Street Scene ran 601 performances on Broadway and toured throughout the United States. During the play's six-month run in London, Aldous Huxley became an ardent fan of Erin O'Brien-Moore, and saw her starring performance as Rose Maurrant at least three times.

== Reception ==
"Still unwilling to write a conventional play according to the safe, stereotyped forms, Elmer Rice contents himself with writing an honest one," wrote Brooks Atkinson of The New York Times. "He has observed and transcribed his material perfectly. Never did the phantasmagorira of street episodes seem so lacking in sketchy types and so packed with fully delineated character."

== Accolades ==
Street Scene received the 1929 Pulitzer Prize for Drama. It was included in Burns Mantle's The Best Plays of 1928–29.

== Adaptations ==
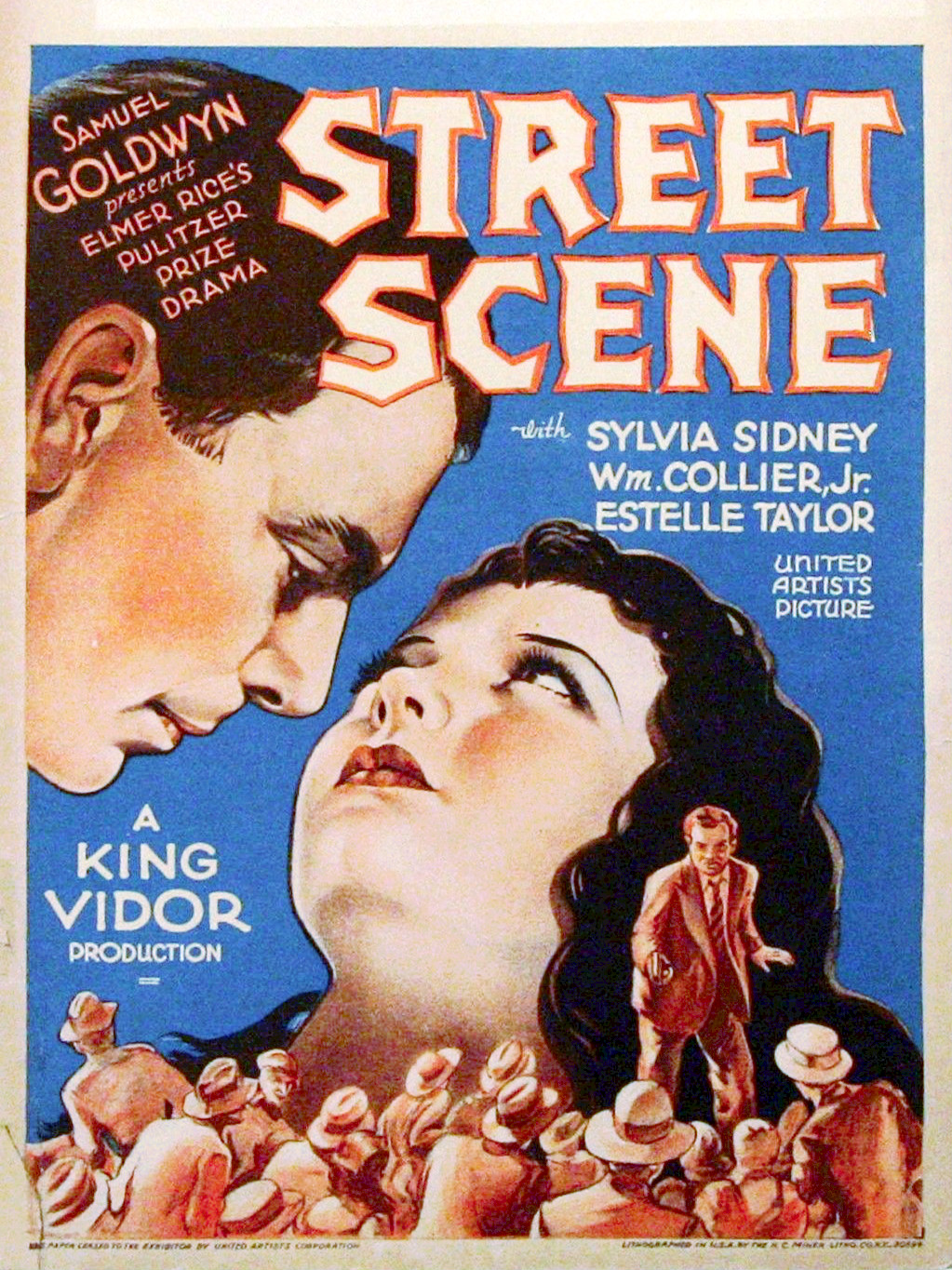
Poster for the 1931 film Street Scene

Elmer Rice adapted his play for Samuel Goldwyn's 1931 motion picture production Street Scene, directed by King Vidor. Starring Sylvia Sidney, William Collier Jr. and Estelle Taylor, the film marked the screen debut of Beulah Bondi, who recreated her Broadway role as the malicious gossip Emma Jones. Others reprising their stage roles were Eleanor Wesselhoeft, Conway Washburne, T. H. Manning, John Qualen, Anna Konstant, George Humbert and Matthew McHugh.

Rice wrote the book for Kurt Weill's 1946 opera Street Scene, adapting his play and writing lyrics with Langston Hughes. It premiered January 9, 1947, at the Adelphi Theater, New York City.

Street Scene has been adapted for television three times:

- In a presentation by The Philco Television Playhouse on October 31, 1948, Erin O'Brien-Moore performed the role of Rose's mother Anna. The role of Rose, which O'Brien-Moore had performed on Broadway, was played by Betty Field (Field was at that time married to Rice).
- Celanese Theatre presented a 30-minute adaption on April 2, 1952, starring Colleen Gray, Paul Kelly, Ann Dvorak and Michael Wager.
- BBC Television presented an adaptation on November 15, 1959.

== Revivals ==
New York's Brave New World Repertory Theater staged a production on a street in Brooklyn's Park Slope neighborhood in late June 2013. Fifth Street in the borough was closed for the two matinée performances.
