= The First Legion =

1951 film

- Theatrical release poster
- Directed by: Douglas Sirk
- Screenplay by: Emmet Lavery
- Based on: The First Legion by Emmet Lavery
- Produced by: Douglas Sirk
- Starring: Charles Boyer; William Demarest; Lyle Bettger; Walter Hampden; Barbara Rush; Wesley Addy; H. B. Warner; Leo G. Carroll
- Cinematography: Robert De Grasse
- Edited by: Francis D. Lyon
- Music by: Hans Sommer
- Production company: Sédif Productions
- Distributed by: United Artists
- Release dates: April 27, 1951 (New York); December 14, 1951 (Los Angeles)
- Running time: 90 minutes
- Country: United States
- Language: English

The First Legion

The First Legion is a 1951 American drama film directed by Douglas Sirk, written by Emmet Lavery and starring Charles Boyer, William Demarest, Lyle Bettger, Walter Hampden, Barbara Rush, Wesley Addy, H. B. Warner and Leo G. Carroll. The film was released on April 27, 1951 by United Artists.

The First Legion is based on Lavery's play of the same name, which opened on Broadway at the 46th Street Theatre in October 1934. The play, which had no female characters, moved to the Biltmore Theatre, where it closed in January 1935.

== Plot ==
Fr. John Fulton, a Jesuit instructor in a seminary school, feels that he has lost his vocation and talks with his friend Fr. Marc Arnoux. On the night when he plans to leave the seminary, his crippled former teacher Fr. Jose Sierra miraculously rises and walks to implore Fr. Fulton to remain. The young, wheelchair-using neighbor Terry Gilmartin regains hope that a similar miracle might allow her to walk. Her physician, Dr. Peter Morrell, who had attended Fr. Sierra, is in love with Terry. He confesses to Fr. Arnoux that he had engineered Sierra's miraculous recovery but refuses Fr. Arnoux's advice to tell the truth. The seminary rector orders Fr. Arnoux to testify as to the validity of the miracle at the Vatican in Rome. When his highly respected subordinate refuses, the rector dies of a heart attack. Dr. Morrell admits his deception, but Terry miraculously arises from her wheelchair and prays for Dr. Morrell.

== Cast ==
- Charles Boyer as Father Marc Arnoux
- William Demarest as Monsignor Michael Carey
- Lyle Bettger as Dr. Peter Morrell
- Walter Hampden as Father Edward Quarterman
- Barbara Rush as Terry Gilmartin
- Wesley Addy as Father John Fulton
- H. B. Warner as Fr. Jose Sierra
- Leo G. Carroll as Father Rector Paul Duquesne
- Taylor Holmes as Father Keene
- H. B. Warner as Fr. Jose Sierra
- George Zucco as Father Robert Stuart
- John McGuire as Father Tom Rawleigh
- Clifford Brooke as Brother Clifford
- Dorothy Adams as Mrs. Dunn
- Molly Lamont as Mrs. Nora Gilmartin
- Queenie Smith as Henrietta
- Jacqueline deWit as Miss Hamilton
- Bill Edwards as Joe

== Production ==
The film was financed by Charles Boyer, for whom the original play's character of Father Aherne was renamed to Father Arnoux, to account for Boyer's French accent.

Filming took place at the Mission Inn in Riverside, California during May and June 1950. Director Douglas Sirk had the Spanish art gallery at the inn converted into a seminary common room, and bedrooms above the gallery were staged to represent the priests' cells. The St. Francis chapel and atrium, the mission's original cloister walk and the monks' music room were also used for filming. The cast and crew of 50 lived at the Mission Inn while filming. Sound recording was accomplished with magnetic tape, which had been a rarity for location filming.

== Reception ==
In a contemporary review for The New York Times, critic Bosley Crowther called The First Legion "a faithful, temperate and generally reasonable film" and wrote: "Mr. Lavery and Mr. Sirk introduce us to such an interesting and genuine group of men and to such a quietly provocative discussion in the better part of their film that it is mentally disturbing to find them ending up in a rush of sentiment. ... Barbara Rush's performance as the crippled girl who is 'cured' at the end (it was a young lad when the play was done on Broadway) is in a romantic, artificial vein. It is indicative of the nature of the climax that the 'miracle' happens to her."

Critic Edwin Schallert of the Los Angeles Times wrote: "'The First Legion' merits a special presentation, rather than being offered as an everyday sort of event among pictures. It will be testing for audiences in the slower earlier sequences. But it comes to life as the miracle is developed around which the story revolves."

== Restoration ==
The film was restored by the UCLA Film & Television Archive, with funding provided by the Louis B. Mayer Foundation and the Carl David Memorial Fund for Film Preservation. The restoration was publicly screened in March 2015.
