= The Birth of a Baby =

1938 film by Al Christie

- Directed by: A. E. Christie
- Written by: Burke Symon; Arthur Jarrett
- Produced by: Jack H. Skirball
- Starring: Eleanore King; Richard Gordon; Ruth Matteson; Josephine Dunn
- Cinematography: George Webber
- Production companies: Christie Productions; The American Committee on Maternal Welfare, Inc.
- Distributed by: Special Pictures Corporation
- Release date: 1938
- Running time: 72:00
- Country: United States
- Language: English
- Budget: $50,000
- Box office: $750,000 (rentals)

The Birth of a Baby is a 1938 American educational film about childbearing. It was directed by famed Canadian producer of silent shorts Al Christie. The film stars Eleanore King, Richard Gordon, Ruth Matteson, and Josephine Dunn. The film's original negative was lost in the Fox vault fire of 1937.

== Cast ==
- Eleanore King as Mary Burgess
- Richard Gordon as Dr. Wilson
- Ruth Matteson as Julia Norton
- Josephine Dunn as Mrs. Bromley
- William Post Jr. as John Burgess
- Frederica Going as Mrs. Perry
- Helen Hawley as Mrs. Burgess
- Kathleen Comegys as Mrs. Wilson
- Robert Ober as Mr. Case
- Edith Gresham as Mrs. Case
- Walter Gilbert as Mr. Perry

== Censorship ==
The film featured scenes of actual childbirth and this caused issues for the Hays Office. The filmmakers tried to get around the need for a Seal of Approval from the Hays Office by appealing directly to local and state censorship boards for approval to show the film in mainstream theaters. The film was banned in New York State in 1939 by a court ruling that scenes of childbirth were too indecent for public entertainment.

The film was rejected by the British Board of Film Censors in 1939, after which the London County Council approved it for exhibition only to adults, with other local authorities also passing it. The BBFC rejected the film again when it was resubmitted in 1947, following which the London County Council granted it an A certificate, meaning it was not recommended for children but admission was unrestricted.
