= Mother (play) =

Mother is a 1910 play which was the first successful play by Jules Eckert Goodman.

The play was first performed on March 7, 1910 in Plainfield, New Jersey. Produced by William A. Brady, it debuted on Broadway on September 7, 1910 at the Hackett Theatre. It played at the Hackett through December 3, 1910, and then moved to the Circle(?) Theatre, where it opened on December 5 and ran through December 31, for a total run of 133 performances.

The play was adapted to the screen in a 1914 silent film of the same name.

== 1910 Broadway cast ==
- Emma Dunn as Mrs. Katherine Wetherill
- Frederick Perry as William Howard Wetherill
- Albert Latcha as Walter Thompson Wetherill
- Arthur Ross as James Bingham Wetherill
- David Ross as John Walton Wetherill
- Minnette Barrett as Ardath Wetherill
- Marion Capman as Leonore Wetherill
- James Brophy as John Rufus Chase
- John Stokes as Harry Lake
- Jane Corcoran as Elizabeth Terhune
- Justine Cutting as Agatha
