= Antigone (Anouilh play) =

1944 play by Jean Anouilh

- Original language: French
- Written by: Jean Anouilh
- Characters: Chorus; Antigone; Nurse; Ismene; Haemon; Creon; First Guard (Jonas); Second Guard (a Corporal); Third Guard; Messenger; Page; Eurydice
- Subject: War
- Genre: tragedy

Premiere
- Date: February 6, 1944
- Place: France

Antigone (French pronunciation: [ɑ̃tiɡɔn]) is a tragedy play by Jean Anouilh, inspired by the play of the same name by Sophocles.

== Performance history ==
=== Original production ===
Antigone was first performed in Paris at the Théâtre de l'Atelier on February 6, 1944, during the Nazi occupation. Produced under Nazi censorship, the play is purposefully ambiguous with regard to the rejection of authority (represented by Antigone) and the acceptance of it (represented by Creon). The parallels to the French Resistance and the Nazi occupation are clear, however. The original cast included Monelle Valentin (Antigone), Jean Davy (Créon), Suzanne Flon (Ismène), and André Le Gall (Hémon); the staging, decor and costumes were by André Barsacq.

=== British première ===
Antigone received its British première by the Old Vic Theatre Company at the New Theatre, London, on 10 February 1949. The production was produced by Laurence Olivier (who also played the role of Chorus) and had the following cast:

- Chorus – Laurence Olivier
- Antigone – Vivien Leigh
- Nurse – Eileen Beldon
- Ismene – Meg Maxwell
- Haemon – Dan Cunningham
- Creon – George Relph
- First Guard (Jonas) – Thomas Heathcote
- Second Guard (a Corporal) – Hugh Stewart
- Third Guard – George Cooper
- Messenger – Terence Morgan
- Page – Michael Redington
- Eurydice – Helen Beck

== Productions and adaptations ==
Actress Katharine Cornell produced and starred in a 1946 production at the National Theatre in Washington, D.C. Sir Cedric Hardwicke played the role of King Creon. Also performing were Bertha Belmore, Wesley Addy, Ruth Matteson, George Mathews, and Oliver Cliff, and Marlon Brando (as the Messenger), Michael Higgins (The Third Guard). The production was staged by Cornell's husband Guthrie McClintic. The translation was by Lewis Galantière. It has since been published many times. In 1959, it was staged at the East 74th Street Theater in Manhattan, New York City.

There was an English-language television production for the BBC in 1959 starring Dorothy Tutin.

It was filmed for Australian television in 1966.

In 1974, an American television production of the play, presented on PBS' Great Performances, starred Geneviève Bujold and Stacy Keach.

There are also English translations by Barbara Bray in 1987 and by Jeremy Sams in 2002. The Bray translation was adapted for BBC Radio 3 in 2024, with Rosy McEwen as Antigone and Sean Bean as Creon.
