= Mother (1914 film) =

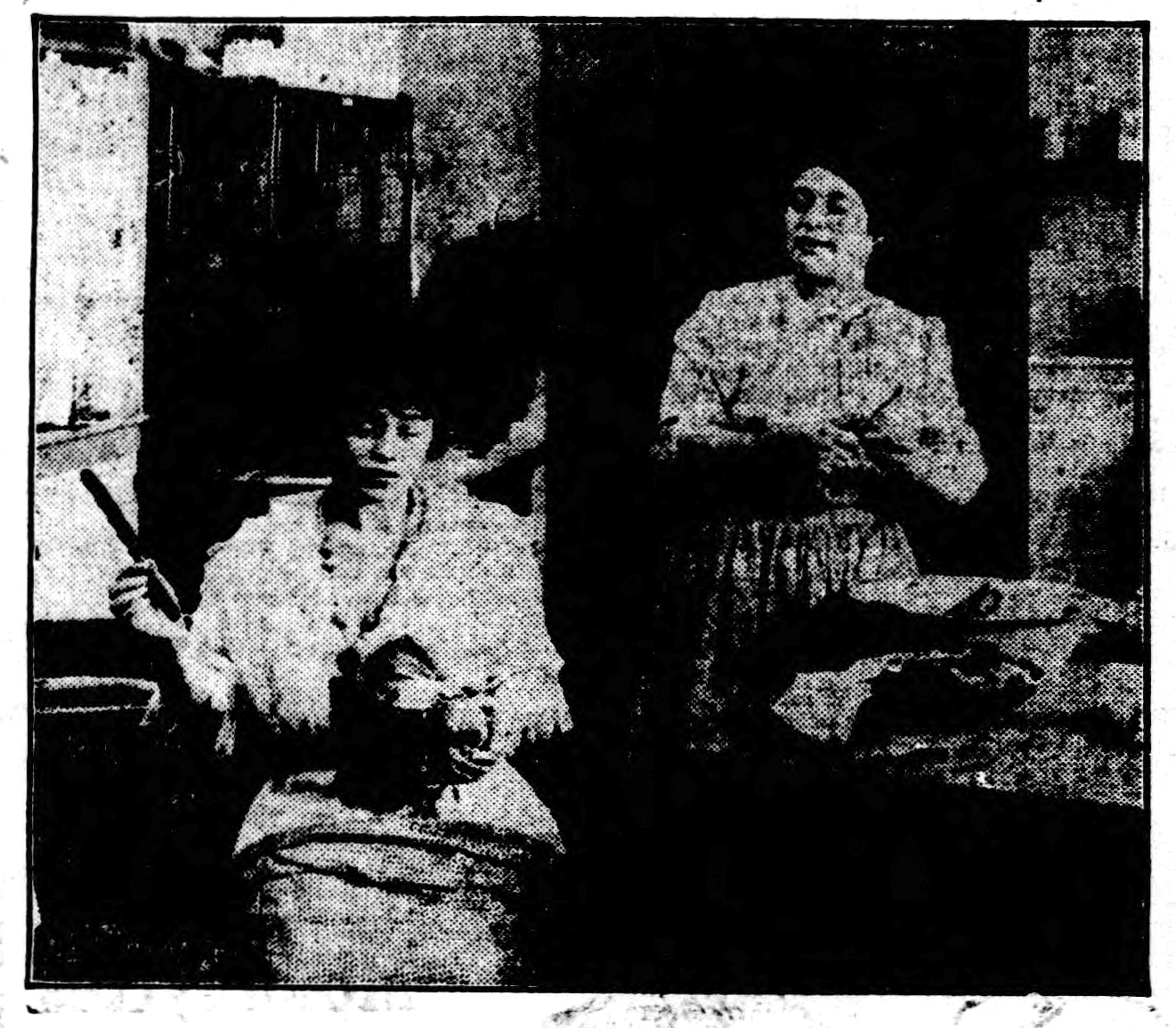
- Newspaper publicity image, 1914
- Directed by: Maurice Tourneur
- Written by: Maurice Tourneur
- Based on: Mother by Jules Eckert Goodman
- Produced by: William A. Brady
- Starring: Emma Dunn
- Distributed by: World Film
- Release date: September 28, 1914
- Running time: 40 minutes
- Country: United States
- Language: Silent film (English intertitles)

Mother is a 1914 American silent drama film directed by Maurice Tourneur and starring Emma Dunn. The film marked Tourneur's first American-made film. Dunn was 39 years old and had starred on Broadway in the play version of the story this film is based on. This film was produced by William A. Brady who also produced the 1910 play. The film has a similar plot to the 1920 Fox film Over the Hill to the Poorhouse.

The Library of Congress has a complete print.

== Cast ==
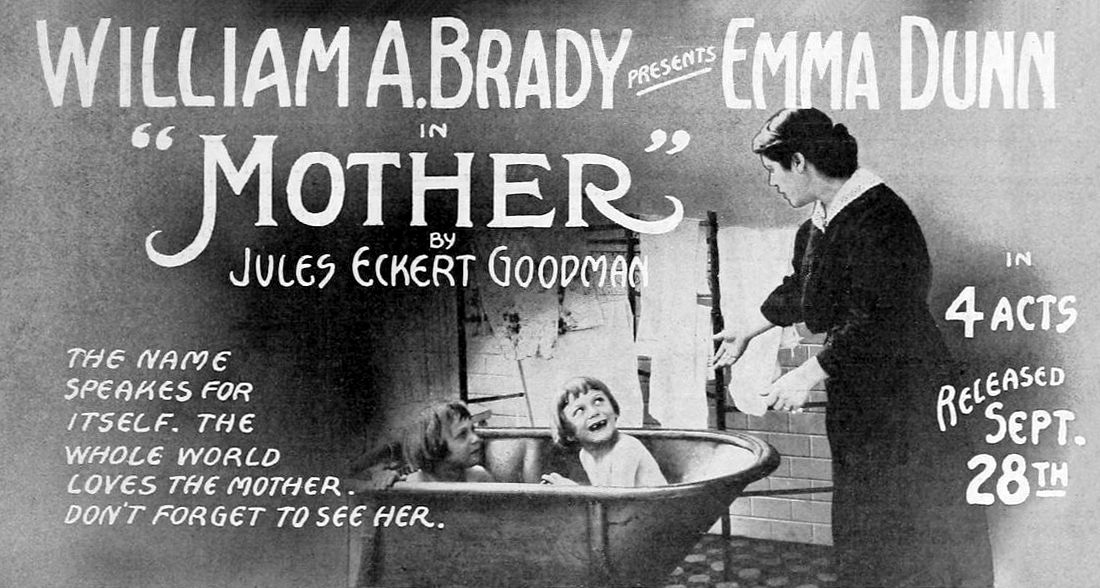
Advertisement for Mother

- Emma Dunn as Mrs. Wetherell
- Edwin Baker as William
- Belle Adair as Sadie
- Henri Desforges as Walter
- Jane Corcoran as Bess
- Lillian Cook as Lenore
- Priscilla Dean as Ardath
