= Emma Dunn =

English-American actress

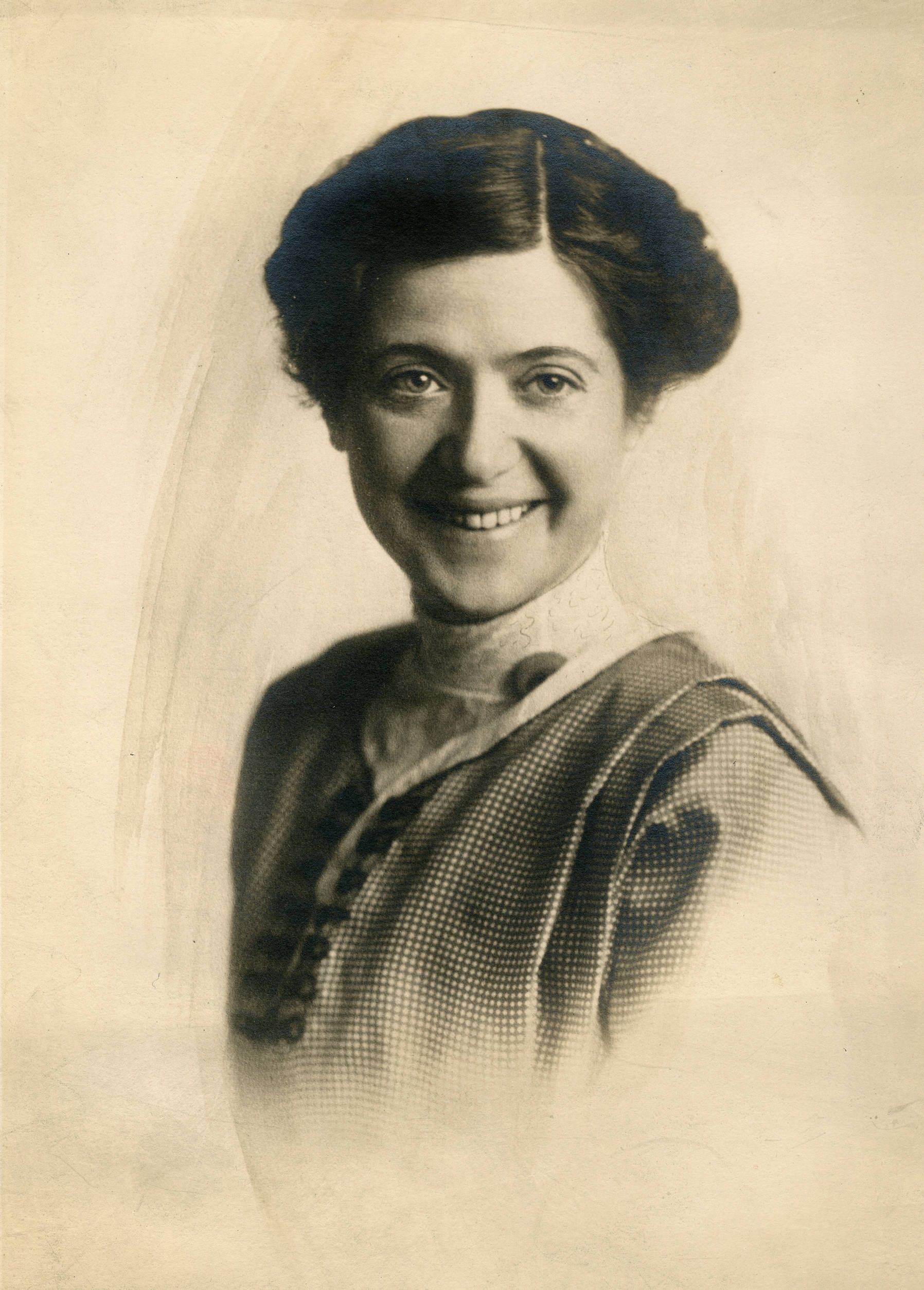
- Dunn in 1911
- Born: 26 February 1875; Birkenhead, Cheshire, England
- Died: 14 December 1966 (aged 91); Los Angeles, California, U.S.
- Occupation: Actress
- Years active: 1902–1948
- Spouses: Harry Beresford (m. 1897; div. 1909) John W. Stokes (m. 1909; died 1931)
- Children: 2

Emma Dunn (26 February 1875 – 14 December 1966) was an English actress. After starting her acting career on stage in London, she became known for her works in numerous films and Broadway productions.

== Career ==
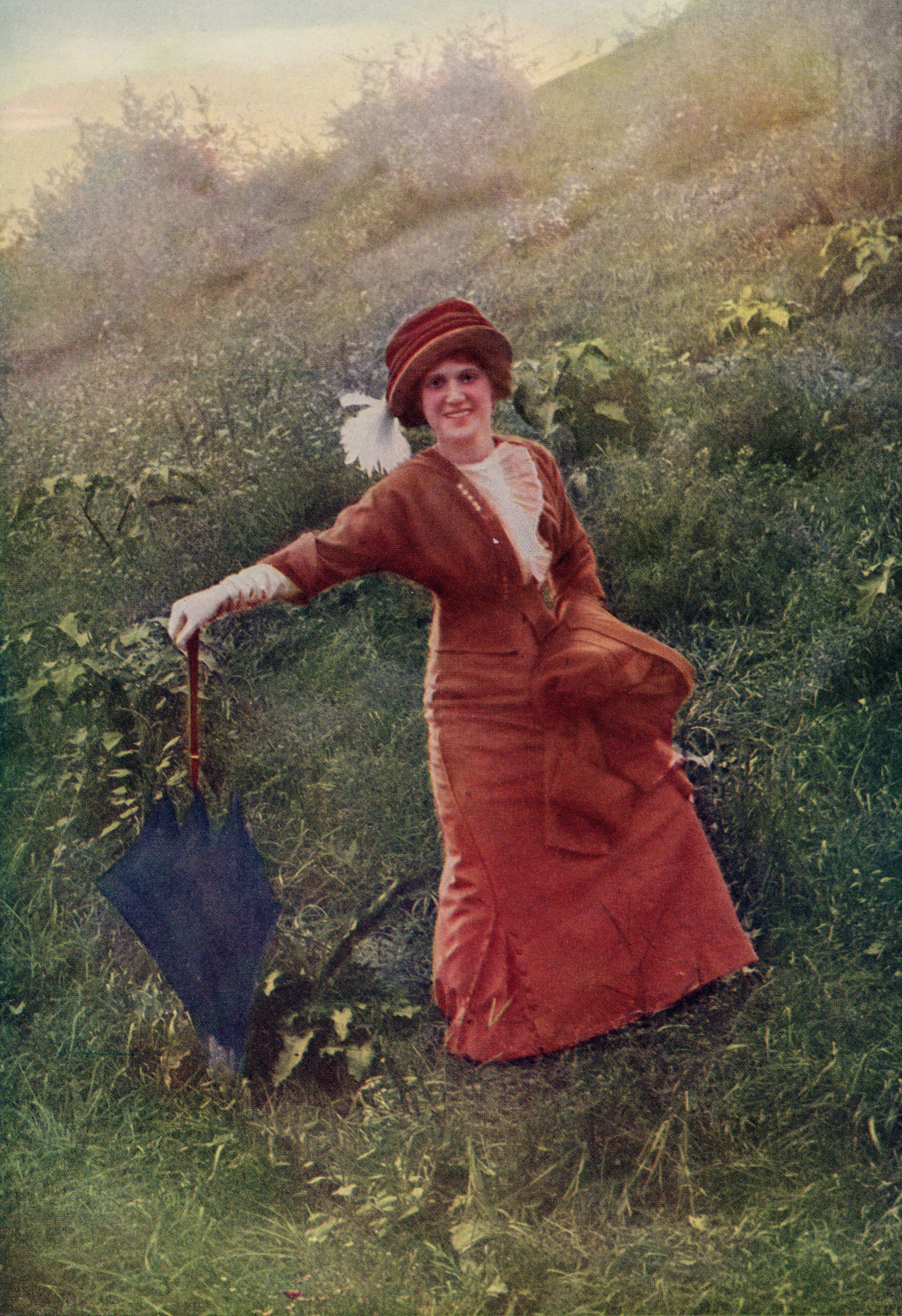
Emma Dunn, star of The Governor's Lady (1912)

Emma Dunn appeared onstage in her early teens, graduating to the London stage for several years and later became a noted Broadway actress. She appeared in the first American production of Ibsen's Peer Gynt (1906) with Richard Mansfield as Peer. She played Peer's mother, Ase, even though she was, in real life, 20 years younger than Mansfield. She appeared in three productions for theatre impresario David Belasco: The Warrens of Virginia (1907), The Easiest Way (1909) and The Governor's Lady (1912). In The Easiest Way, Dunn portrayed Annie, who was black, in blackface. In 1913 Dunn appeared in vaudeville.

Dunn made her first film in 1914, a silent film of her 1910 stage success, Mother, directed by Maurice Tourneur. This was Tourneur's first American film. Dunn's second film was 1920's Old Lady 31, reprising the role she played in the 1916 Broadway play of the same name. One more silent film followed in 1924, Pied Piper Malone, and then she made her sound debut in Side Street, co-starring the Moore brothers, Matt, Owen and Tom as her sons.

Dunn wrote two books on elocution and speech: Thought Quality in the Voice (1933) and You Can Do It (1947).

== Personal life ==
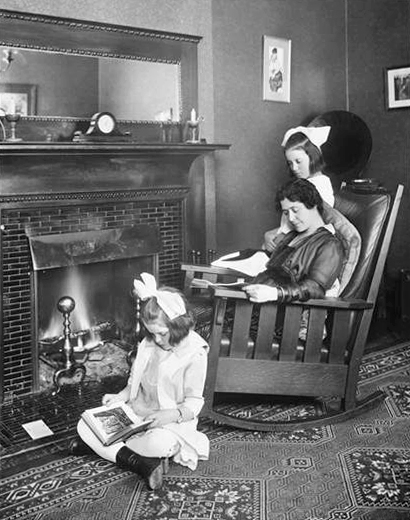
Emma Dunn with daughters Helen (left) and Dorothy (1915)

Emma Dunn was born 26 February 1875, in Birkenhead, England, although she sometimes gave her year of birth as 1883.

Dunn married Harry Beresford, an actor who was then known professionally as Harry J. Morgan, in Chicago on 4 October 1897. They divorced on 10 February 1909, in New York City. She was awarded sole custody of their young daughter, Dorothy. On 19 May 1909, Dunn married John W. Stokes (John W. S. Sullivan), an actor, playwright and theatrical manager. They subsequently adopted a second daughter, Helen. The couple divorced sometime between 1923 and Stokes' death in 1931.

After suffering a heart attack some months before, Dunn died 14 December 1966 in Los Angeles, California, aged 91.

== Theatre credits ==
Date	Title	Role	Notes
30 November – 6 December 1902	The Wrong Mr. Wright	Tillie Bird	National tour beginning at Morosco's Burbank Theatre, Los Angeles
8 January – January 1906	The Redemption of David Corson		Majestic Theatre, New York City
28 October 1906 – January 1907	Peer Gynt	Ase	Grand Opera House, Chicago
25 February – 23 March 1907	Peer Gynt	Ase	New Amsterdam Theatre, New York City
3 December 1907 – October 1908	The Warrens of Virginia	Mrs. Warren	Belasco Theatre, Stuyvesant Theatre, New York City
19 January – June 1909	The Easiest Way	Annie	Stuyvesant Theatre, New York City
7 September – 31 December 1910	Mother	Mrs. Katherine Wetherill	Hackett Theatre, Criterion Theatre, New York City
10 September 1912 – January 1913	The Governor's Lady	Mary Slade	Theatre Republic, New York City
7 January – July 1915	Sinners	Mrs. Horton	Playhouse Theatre, New York City
30 October 1916 – March 1917	Old Lady 31	Angie	38th Street Theatre, New York City
16 August – 10 September 1921	Sonny	Mrs. Crosby	Cort Theatre, New York City
24 November 1924 – January 1925	Dawn	Mary Slayton	Sam H. Harris Theatre, New York City
24 November 1925 – 19??	Rip Van Winkle	Gretchen	Boston Repertory Theatre, Boston
January 1927	Junk	Old Sal	Garrick Theatre, New York City

== Filmography ==
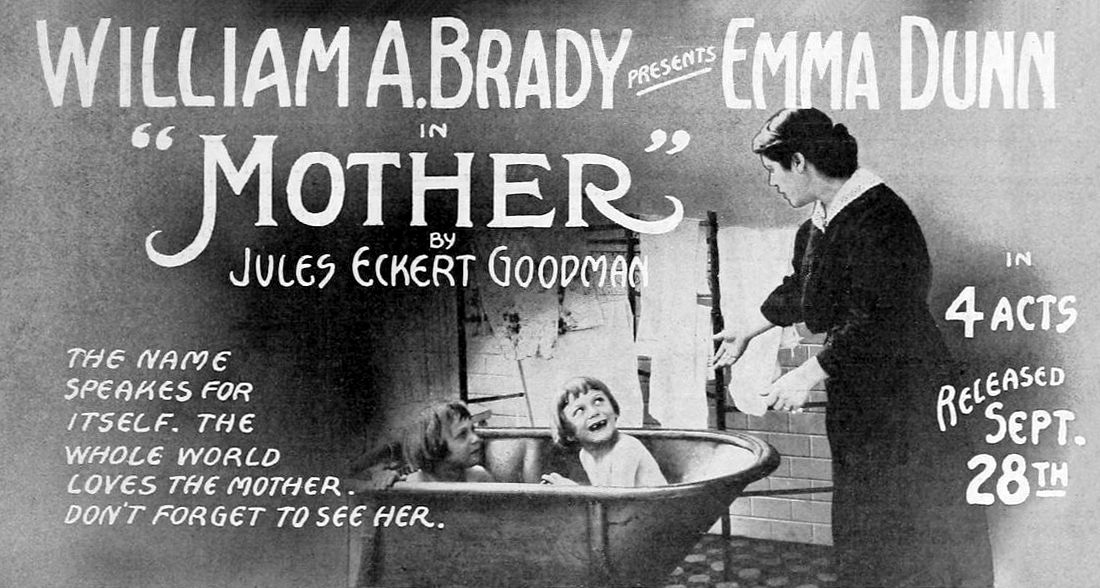
Advertisement for Mother (1914)

Year	Title	Role	Notes
1914	Mother	Mrs. Wetherell	
1920	Old Lady 31	Angie Rose	
1924	Pied Piper Malone	Mother Malone	
1929	Side Street	Mrs. O'Farrell	
1930	Manslaughter	Miss Bennett	
1931	Bad Sister	Mrs. Madison	
1931	Compromised	Mrs. Squires	
1931	The Guilty Generation	Nina	
1931	Morals for Women	Mrs. Hutson	
1931	The Prodigal	Mrs. Cynthia Farraday	
1931	The Texan	Señora Ibarra	
1931	This Modern Age	Mrs. Blake	
1931	Too Young to Marry	Jennie Bumpsted	
1931	Under Eighteen	Mrs. Evans	
1932	Blessed Event	Mrs. Roberts	
1932	Broken Lullaby	Mrs. Miller	
1932	The Cohens and Kellys in Hollywood	Mrs. Sarah Cohen	
1932	Hell's House	Emma Clark	
1932	It's Tough to Be Famous	"Moms" McClenahan	
1932	Letty Lynton	Mrs. Darrow	
1932	The Wet Parade	Mrs. Sally Chilcote	
1932	When a Feller Needs a Friend	Kind lady	
1933	Elmer, the Great	Mrs. Kane	
1933	Grand Slam	Sob sister	
1933	Hard to Handle	Mrs. Hawks	
1933	It's Great to Be Alive	Mrs. Wilton	
1933	A Man of Sentiment	Mrs. Russell	
1933	Private Jones	Mrs. Jones	
1934	Dark Hazard	Mrs. Mayhew	
1934	Dr. Monica	Mrs. Monahan	
1934	Flirtation	Mrs. Poole	
1934	The Quitter	Cordelia Tilford	
1935	Another Face	Sheila's mother	
1935	The Crusades	Mother of Alan	
1935	George White's 1935 Scandals	Aunt Jane	
1935	The Glass Key	"Mom"	
1935	The Keeper of the Bees	Margaret Campbell	
1935	Ladies Crave Excitement	Mary Phelan	
1935	Little Big Shot	Matron	
1935	Seven Keys to Baldpate	Mrs. Quimby	
1935	This Is the Life	Mrs. Davis	
1936	The Harvester	Granny Moreland	
1936	Mr. Deeds Goes to Town	Mrs. Meredith, Deed's housekeeper	Uncredited
1936	Second Wife	Mrs. Brown	
1937	Circus Girl	Molly	
1937	The Emperor's Candlesticks	Housekeeper	
1937	Madame X	Rose	
1937	Varsity Show	Mrs. Smith	
1937	Waikiki Wedding	Old woman	
1937	When You're in Love	Mrs. Hamilton	
1938	The Cowboy and the Lady	Ma Hawkins	
1938	Cowboy from Brooklyn	Ma Hardy	
1938	The Crowd Roars	Laura McCoy	
1938	The Duke of West Point	Mrs. West	
1938	Lord Jeff	Mrs. Briggs	
1938	Thanks for the Memory	Mrs. Platt	
1938	Three Loves Has Nancy	Mrs. Briggs	
1938	Young Dr. Kildare	Martha Kildare	
1939	Calling Dr. Kildare	Martha Kildare	
1939	Each Dawn I Die	Mrs. Ross	
1939	Hero for a Day	"Mom" Higgins	
1939	The Llano Kid	Dona Teresa	
1939	The Secret of Dr. Kildare	Martha Kildare	
1939	Son of Frankenstein	Amelia	
1940	Dance, Girl, Dance	Mrs. Simpson	
1940	Dr. Kildare Goes Home	Martha Kildare	
1940	Dr. Kildare's Crisis	Martha Kildare	
1940	Dr. Kildare's Strange Case	Martha Kildare	
1940	The Great Dictator	Mrs. Jaeckel	
1940	Half a Sinner	Granny Gladden	
1940	High School	Mrs. O'Neill	
1940	Little Orvie	Mrs. Welty	
1940	One Crowded Night	Ma	
1940	Yesterday's Heroes	Aunt Winnie	
1940	You Can't Fool Your Wife	Mrs. Fields	
1941	Dr. Kildare's Wedding Day	Martha Kildare	
1941	Ladies in Retirement	Sister Theresa	
1941	Mr. & Mrs. Smith	Martha	
1941	The Monster and the Girl	Aunt Della	
1941	The Penalty	"Ma" McCormick	
1941	Rise and Shine	Mrs. Murray	
1941	Scattergood Baines	Mirandy Baines	
1941	Scattergood Meets Broadway	Mirandy Baines	
1941	Scattergood Pulls the Strings	Mirandy Baines	
1942	Babes on Broadway	Mrs. Williams	
1942	I Married a Witch	Wife of the justice of the peace	
1942	The Mad Martindales	Agnes	
1942	The Postman Didn't Ring	Martha Carter	
1942	The Talk of the Town	Mrs. Shelley	
1942	When Johnny Comes Marching Home	Nora Flanagan	
1943	The Cross of Lorraine	Mme. Marchand	
1943	Hoosier Holiday	Molly Baker	
1943	Minesweeper	Mom	
1943	The North Star	Old lady	
1944	Are These Our Parents?	Ma Henderson	
1944	The Bridge of San Luis Rey	Dona Mercedes	
1944	Irish Eyes Are Smiling	Mother Machree	
1944	It Happened Tomorrow	Mrs. Keever	
1944	My Buddy	Mary Ballinger	
1945	The Horn Blows at Midnight	Mrs. Smith	
1945	The Hoodlum Saint	Maggie	
1946	Night Train to Memphis	Mom Acuff	
1947	Life with Father	Margaret, the cook	
1947	Mourning Becomes Electra	Mrs. Borden	
1948	The Woman in White	Mrs. Vesey	
