= Nina Gorst =

British novelist and playwright

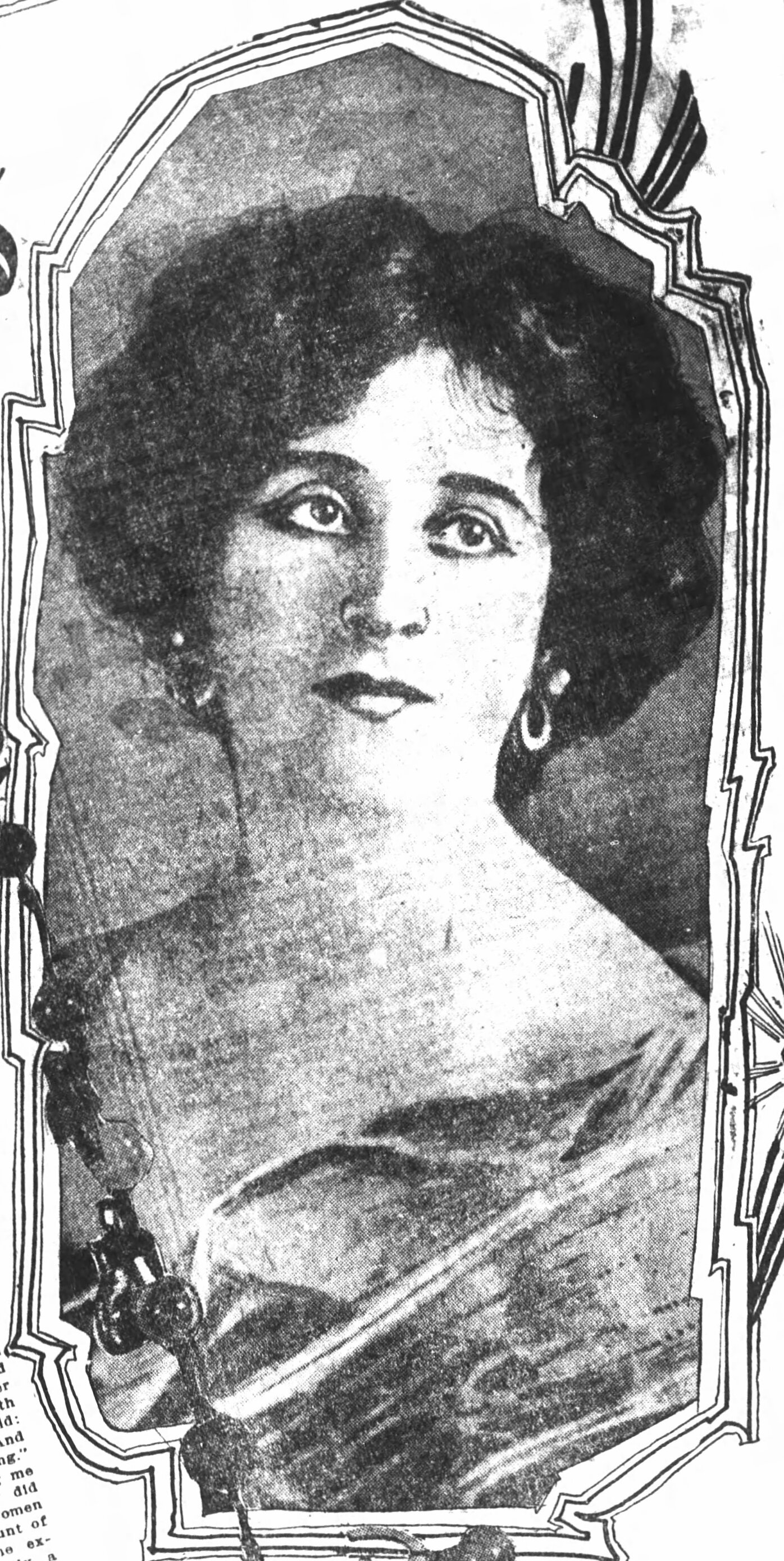
- Born: 2 November 1869
- Died: 19 October 1926 (aged 56); London
- Occupation: Novelist, playwright
- Spouse(s): Harold Edward Gorst
- Family: Charles Rann Kennedy

Nina Cecelia Francesca Gorst (2 November 1869 – 19 October 1926) was a British novelist.

Nina Kennedy was born on 2 November 1869, the daughter of E. R. Kennedy. Her brother was the dramatist Charles Rann Kennedy. She married the journalist and playwright Harold Edward Gorst.

Most of her novels were dramatizations of the lives of poor Londoners focusing on female characters. The Light (1906), which was described as a "Cockney Aurora Leigh," features an orphan girl who gives birth to a blind child. The book follows her spiritual growth as she moves from the workhouse to a series of menial jobs.

Gorst had some spiritualist inclinations. She constantly wore a chain with 19 charms she called talismans. Winifred Graham wrote that Gorst was "the most famous palmist in London".

Nina Gorst died on 19 October 1926 in London.

== Bibliography ==
- Possessed of Devils. 1 vol. London: John Macqueen, 1897.
- --and Afterwards?. 1 vol. London: Greening and Co., 1901.
- This Our Sister, 1905
- The Light, 1906
- Soul of Milly Green, 1907
- Thief on the Cross, 1908
- The Leech, 1911
- The Night is Far Spent, 1919 (autobiography)
- The Misbegotten, 1921
