= Frederica Going =

American actress (1895–1959)

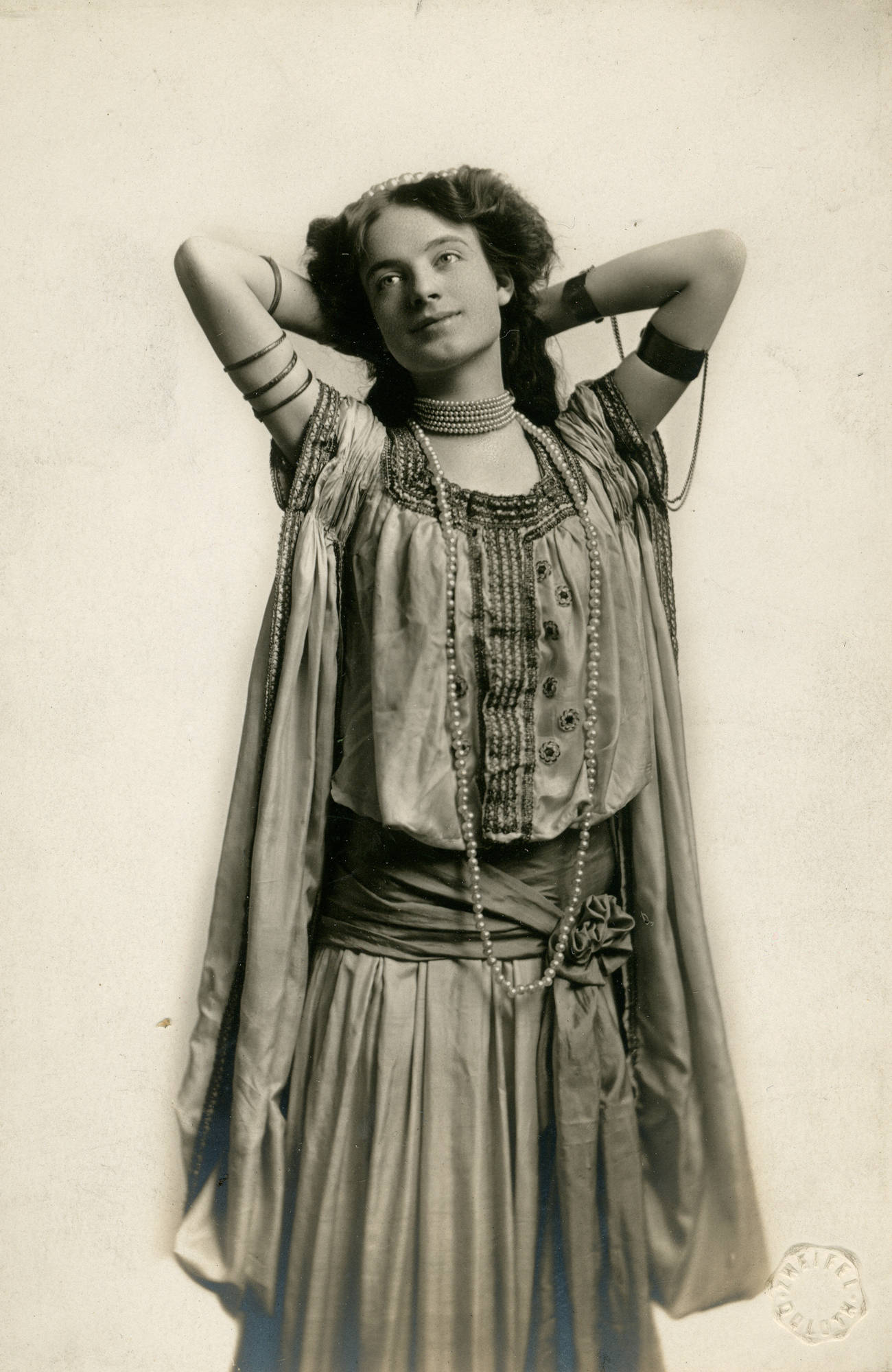
Going in 1909

Frederica Going (August 13, 1895 – April 11, 1959) was an American actress who had an active stage career from the early 1900s into the 1950s. As a child actress she toured nationally in the plays A Little Princess and The Shepherd King. As an adult she appeared in many Broadway productions, including several shows produced by Elmer Rice. In 1944, she originated the role of Ethel Chauvenet in Mary Chase's Harvey.

== Early life and child actress ==
Going was born on August 13, 1895, in New York City, The daughter of Canadian Shakespearean actor Frederick Going. She began her career as a child actress. In 1903, she portrayed Lavinia in a touring production of Frances Hodgson Burnett's A Little Princess that was produced by Charles Bancroft Dillingham. By the time the tour reached the Bijou Theatre in Boston in December 1904, she was playing the role of Ermengarde St. John in this show.

In the 1907–1908 season, Going toured as Adora in Arnold Reeves and Wright Lorimer's religious drama The Shepherd King. She remained in this production in the 1908–1909 season; taking over the role of Princess Michael. In April 1909, she joined the Highland Theater stock company in Pittsburgh, Pennsylvania for performances through the summer of that year. She then resumed touring in The Shepherd King for the 1909–1910 season. In fall 1910, she appeared on Broadway at the Hudson Theatre in a small part in Gilbert Murray's version of Euripides' Electra.

== Adult actress ==
As an adult, the plays that Going performed in ranged from Shakespeare to musical comedy. Some of her Broadway performances include roles in For the Defense (1919–1920), Street Scene (1929–1930), Two on an Island (1940), and A New Life (1943) which were all produced by Elmer Rice. In 1944, she originated the role of Ethel Chauvenet in Mary Chase's Harvey which was staged at the 48th Street Theatre. In 1955, she portrayed Mother Benedict in Frank Carney's The Righteous Are Bold at the Holiday Theatre. She had a role in the 1938 educational film The Birth of a Baby.

Going died on April 11, 1959, aged 65, in New York City, from a myocardial infarction.
