= Charles Rann Kennedy (playwright) =

American dramatist

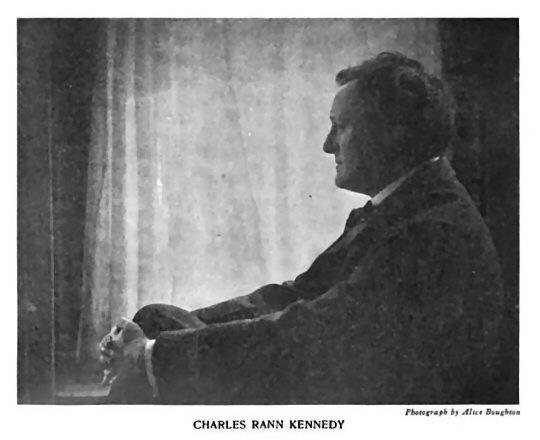
Charles Rann Kennedy

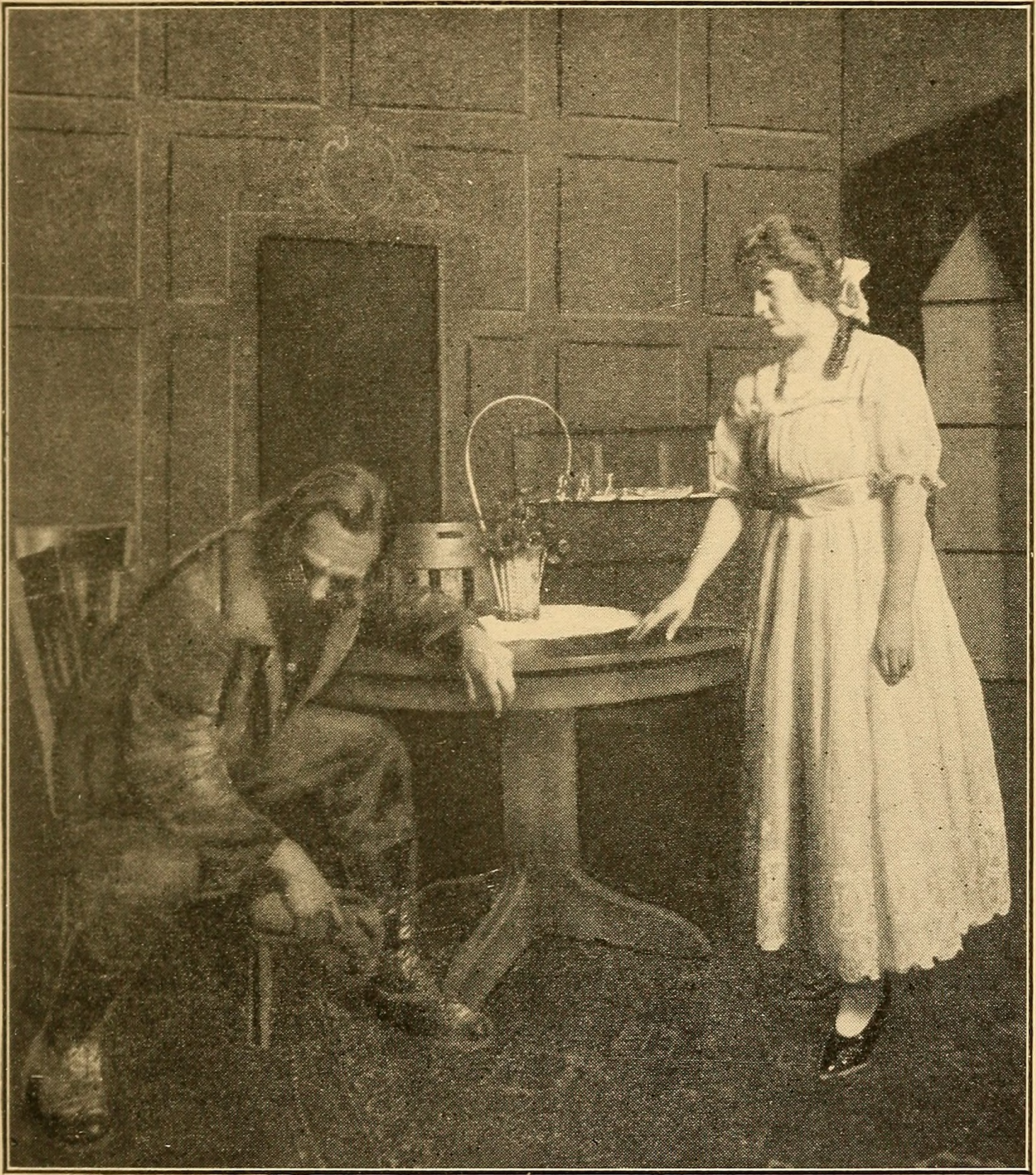
Scene from The Servant in the House

Charles Rann Kennedy (born Derby, England, 14 February 1871; died Los Angeles, California, 16 February 1950) was an Anglo-American dramatist.

== Biography ==
Kennedy was born in Derby on 14 February 1871. His parents were Edmund Hall Kennedy and Annie Leng Kennedy (née Fawcett) and his grandfather Charles Rann Kennedy, the classicist. His sister was the novelist Nina Gorst.

He began life as an office boy, largely educated himself and began lecturing and writing early. He later became an actor, press agent, and theatrical business manager. This led to the production of dramas for the stage with which he combined the writing of short stories, critical articles and poems. He taught for several years at Bennett Junior College in Millbrook, New York. He retired in Los Angeles.

== Works ==
After 1905, he spent most of his time writing drama, including:

- The Servant in the House, his first success (1908)
- The Winter Feast (1908)
- The Terrible Meek (1911)
- The Necessary Evil (1913)
- The Idol-Breaker (1914)
- The Rib of the Man (1916)
- The Army with Banners (1917)

All of these dramas deal with problems of society and are of a serious, reforming tendency.

- World Within: A Cycle of Sonnets (1956) -- posthumously published collection of sonnets

== Family ==
In 1898, he married actress Edith Wynne Matthison. She was an advisor during the development of his dramas, acted in them, and also taught at Bennett Junior College.
