= Jane Corcoran =

American actress (1881–1961)

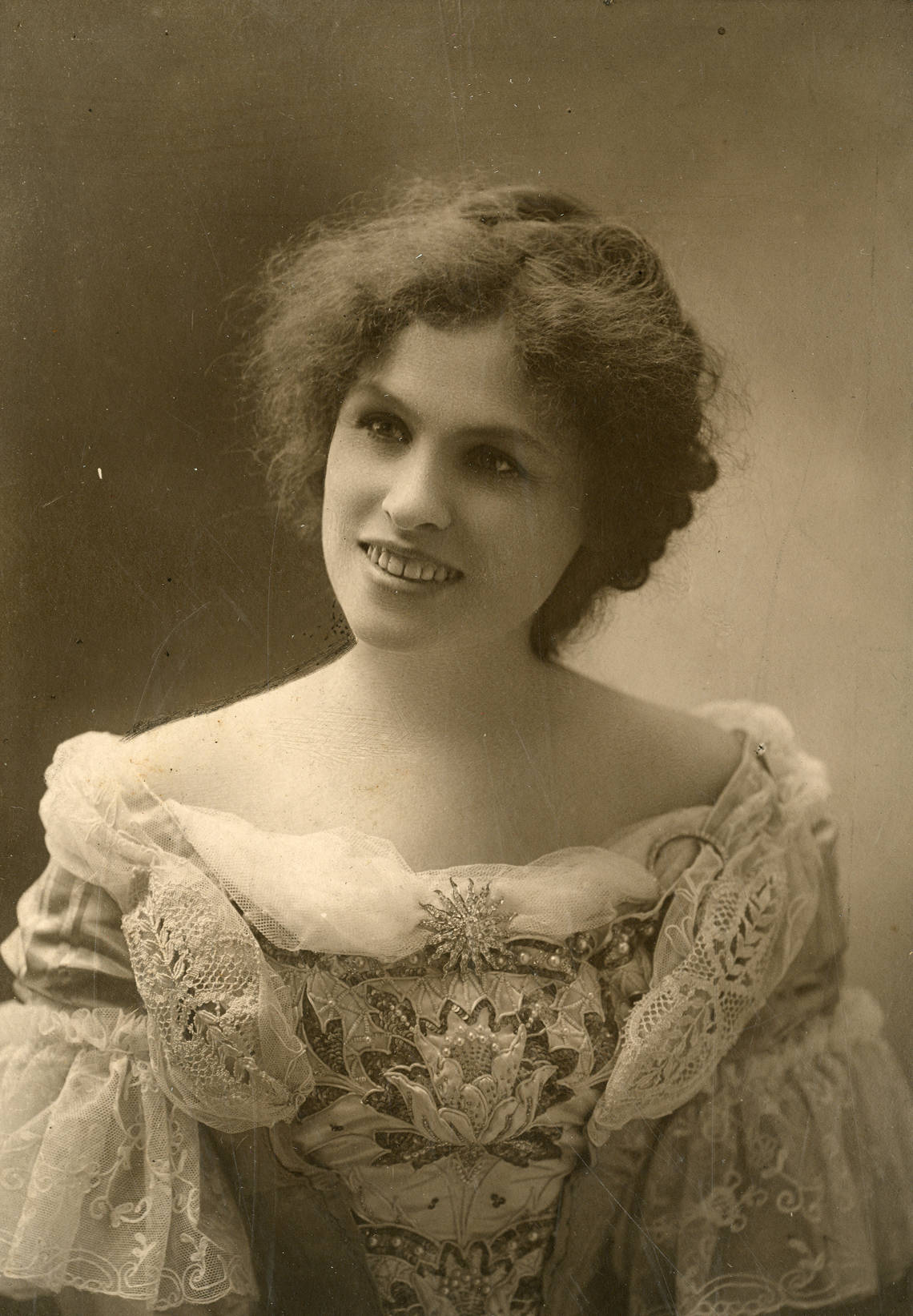
- Born: August 13, 1881; San Francisco, California
- Died: August 27, 1961 (aged 80); San Francisco, California
- Other name: Jane C. Baxter
- Occupation: Actress

Jane Corcoran (August 13, 1881 – August 27, 1961) was an American stage actress.

== Early life ==
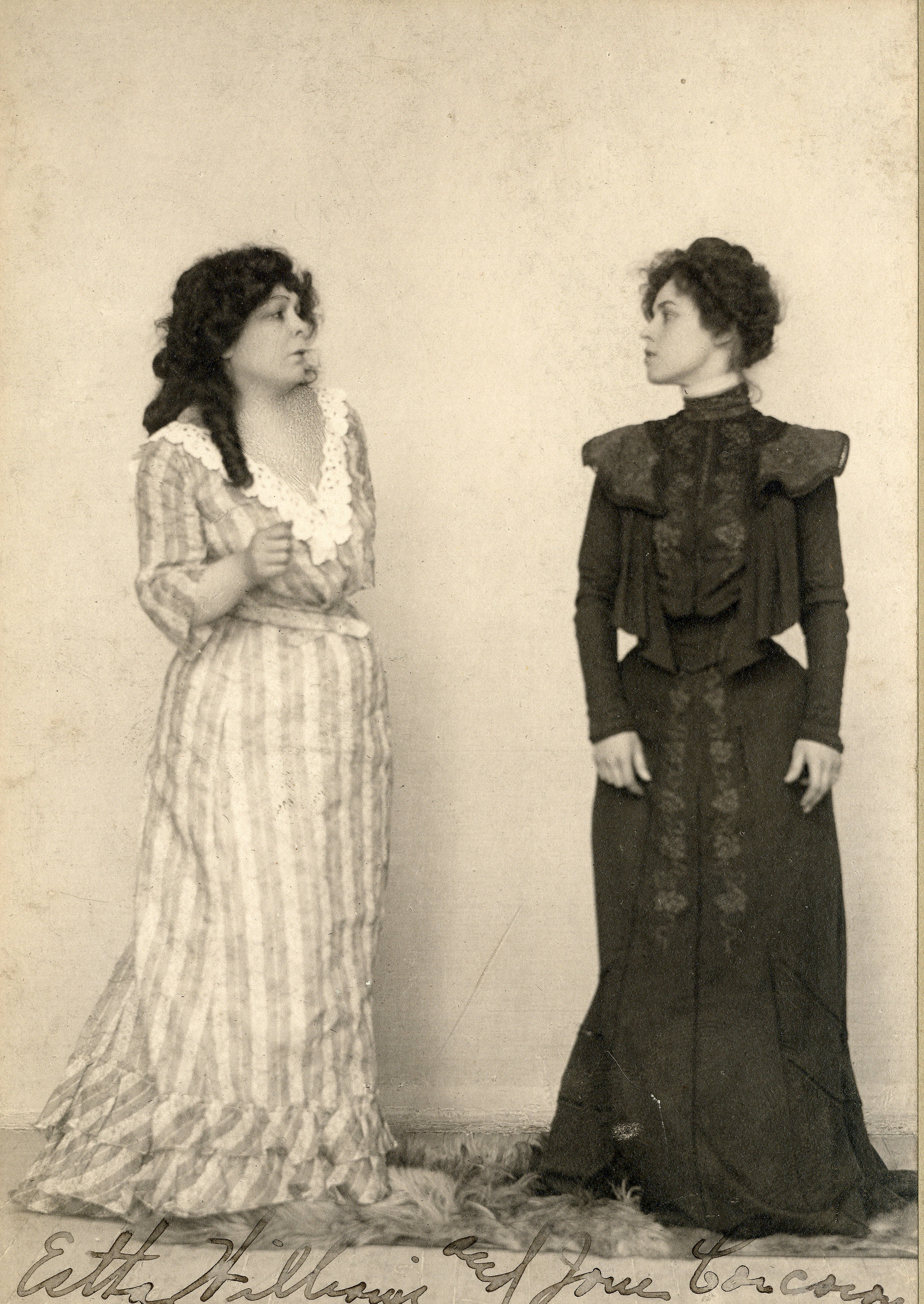
Estha Williams and her daughter Jane Corcoran in "At the Old Crossroads". Dated June 1911.

Jane Eleanor Corcoran was born in San Francisco, the daughter of actress Estha (or Esta) Williams and Joseph T. Corcoran, and stepdaughter of director Arthur Clifford Aiston, who was also her manager. She began acting as a child. She attended the Institute of Holy Angels in Fort Lee, New Jersey, for her schooling.

== Career ==
Broadway appearances by Corcoran included roles in A Stranger in a Strange Land (1899), All for a Girl (1908), Mother (1910), A Rich Man's Son (1912), Life (1914), Drifting (1922), The World We Live In (1922), Kitty's Kisses (1926), Street Scene (1929), Little Orchid Annie (1930), Little Women (1931), A Night of Barrie (1932), A Saturday Night (1933), A Party (1933), and While Parents Sleep (1934). Other stage credits, often in touring productions, included roles in Tennessee's Pardner, Mlle Fifi, At the Old Cross Roads, Pretty Peggy, The Freedom of Suzanne, The Man of the Hour, Divorçons, A Doll's House, and A Gentleman from Mississippi.

Corcoran appeared in a short silent film, Mother (1914), adapted from the Broadway show. She also had uncredited small parts in two later films, Fritz Lang's Fury (1936) and John Cromwell's Abe Lincoln in Illinois (1940).

== Personal life ==
Corcoran married Brooklyn businessman and theatrical producer J. Emmett Baxter in 1902. She was widowed when Baxter died in 1920. She lived with her mother and a nurse in Los Angeles in 1940. She died in Philadelphia at the Greystone Nursing Home on Aug 27, 1961, aged 80 years. She was buried at Westminster Cemetery.
