= Hero for a Day (film) =

- Theatrical release poster
- Directed by: Harold Young
- Screenplay by: Harold Buchman
- Story by: Matt Taylor
- Produced by: Ken Goldsmith
- Starring: Anita Louise; Dick Foran; Charley Grapewin; Emma Dunn; David Holt; Berton Churchill
- Cinematography: John W. Boyle
- Edited by: Charles Maynard
- Production company: Universal Pictures
- Distributed by: Universal Pictures
- Release date: October 6, 1939
- Running time: 66 minutes
- Country: United States
- Language: English

Hero for a Day is a 1939 American drama film directed by Harold Young and written by Harold Buchman. The film stars Anita Louise, Dick Foran, Charley Grapewin, Emma Dunn, David Holt and Berton Churchill. The film was released on October 6, 1939, by Universal Pictures.

== Cast ==
- Anita Louise as Sylvia Higgins
- Dick Foran as 'Brainy' Thornton
- Charley Grapewin as Frank Higgins
- Emma Dunn as 'Mom' Higgins
- David Holt as Billy Higgins
- Berton Churchill as Dow
- Samuel S. Hinds as 'Dutch' Bronson
- Richard Lane as Abbott
- Jerry Marlowe as Fitz
- Frances Robinson as Jean
- Dorothy Arnold as Dorothy
- John Gallaudet as Luke Kelly
