= The Governor's Lady (1915 film) =

1915 film by George Melford

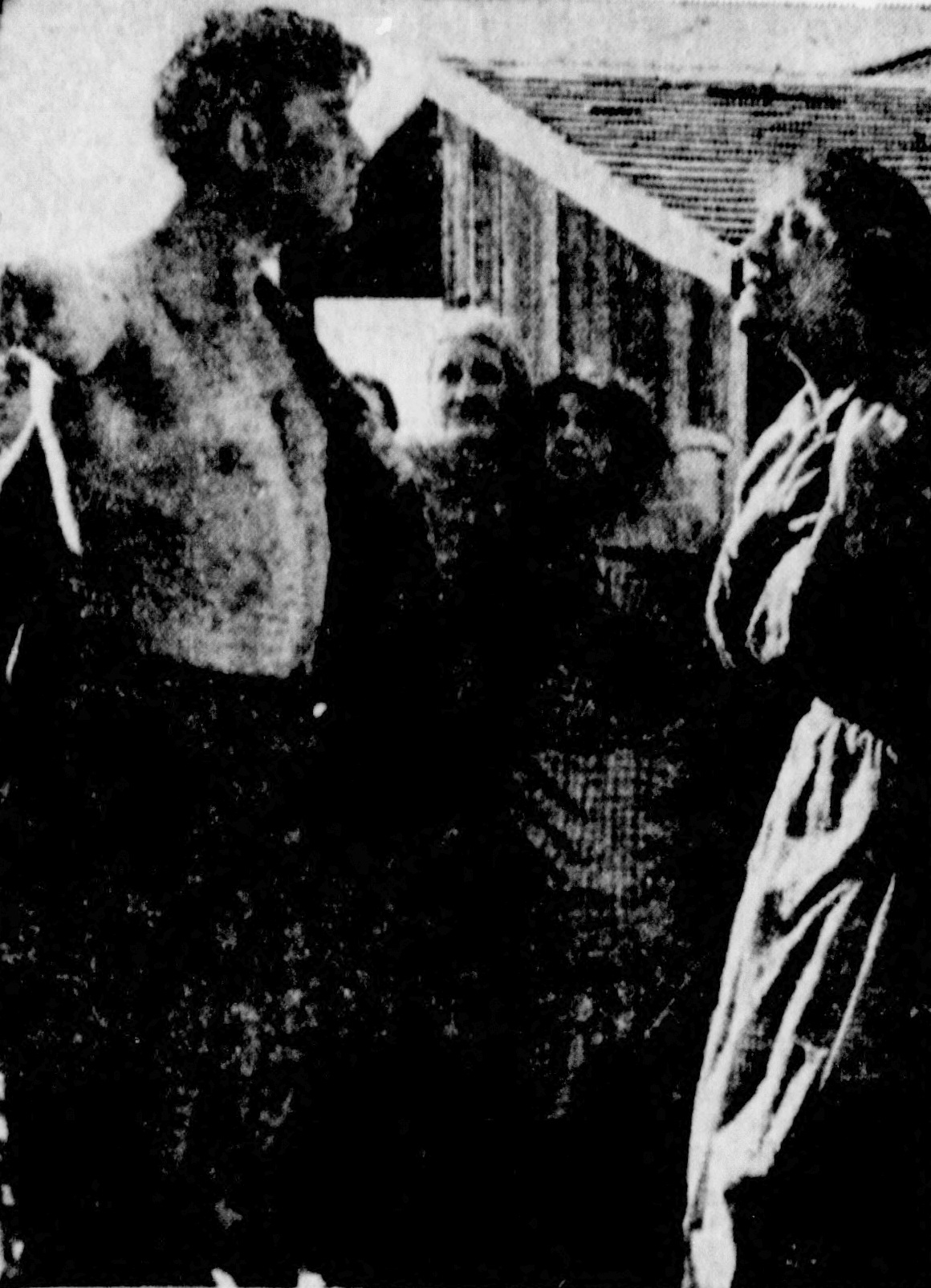
- A scene from the film
- Directed by: George Melford
- Written by: Alice Bradley; William C. deMille
- Produced by: Jesse L. Lasky
- Starring: May Allison; Edith Wynne Matthison; James Neill; Theodore Roberts; Tom Forman
- Production company: Jesse L. Lasky Feature Play Company
- Distributed by: Paramount Pictures
- Release date: March 14, 1915
- Country: United States
- Languages: Silent; English intertitles

The Governor's Lady is a surviving 1915 American silent drama film directed by George Melford and written by William C. deMille based on the 1912 play The Governor's Lady by Alice Bradley.

The film stars May Allison, Edith Wynne Matthison, James Neill, Theodore Roberts and Tom Forman. The film was released on March 14, 1915, by Paramount Pictures.

== Plot ==
A simple miner named Daniel Slade and his wife Mary live in the mountains. Mary has a miscarriage and shortly after that Daniel discovers gold. The new wealth divides them; Daniel wants to join high society but Mary wants to continue living the simple life. Daniel gets frustrated and considers marrying Katherine Strickland, but in the end he realizes he loves Mary and follows her back to the cabin. By this time he has entered politics as a governor and he persuades her to return to be the governor's lady.

== Cast ==
- May Allison as Katherine Strickland
- Edith Wynne Matthison
- James Neill as Daniel Slade
- Theodore Roberts as Senator Strickland
- Tom Forman as Robert Hayes

== Preservation status ==
- A print is preserved in the Library of Congress collection Packard Campus.
