= The Postman Didn't Ring =

1942 film by Harold D. Schuster

- Theatrical release poster
- Directed by: Harold D. Schuster
- Screenplay by: Mortimer Braus
- Story by: Mortimer Braus; Leon Ware
- Produced by: Ralph Dietrich
- Starring: Richard Travis; Brenda Joyce; Spencer Charters; Stanley Andrews; William Bakewell; Emma Dunn
- Cinematography: Joseph MacDonald
- Edited by: Nick DeMaggio
- Music by: Leigh Harline; David Raksin
- Production company: 20th Century Fox
- Distributed by: 20th Century Fox
- Release date: July 3, 1942
- Running time: 68 minutes
- Country: United States
- Language: English

The Postman Didn't Ring is a 1942 American comedy film directed by Harold D. Schuster and written by Mortimer Braus. The film stars Richard Travis, Brenda Joyce, Spencer Charters, Stanley Andrews, William Bakewell and Emma Dunn. The film was released on July 3, 1942, by 20th Century Fox.

== Plot ==
An old mail bag is discovered whilst cleaning out an attic containing letters postmarked 1889. Postal Inspector Brennon (Stanley Andrews) vows that he will hand-deliver the letters to the addressees or their descendants, and his decision has profound effects on a number of lives.

== Cast ==
- Richard Travis as Daniel Carter
- Brenda Joyce as Julie Martin
- Spencer Charters as Judge Ben Holt
- Stanley Andrews as Postal Insp. Brennan
- William Bakewell as Robert Harwood Jr.
- Emma Dunn as Martha Carter
- Joseph Cawthorn as Silas Harwood
- Oscar O'Shea as Judge Barrington
- Erville Alderson as Robert Harwood Sr.
- Jeff Corey as Harwood Green
- Frank M. Thomas as Prosecutor
- Will Wright as Mr. Slade
- Betty Jean Hainey as Marjorie
- Ethel Griffies as Catherine Vandewater
- Henry Roquemore as Jason Peters
- Mary Servoss as Helen Allen
