= Edith Wynne Matthison =

English-American actress (1875–1955)

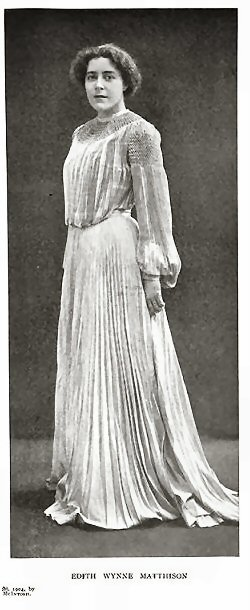
- Photograph from The Burr McIntosh Monthly, 1904
- Born: Edith Wynne Matthison; November 23, 1875; Birmingham, England, UK
- Died: September 23, 1955 (aged 79); Los Angeles, California, U.S.
- Occupation: Actress
- Years active: 1896–1924
- Spouse: Charles Rann Kennedy (1898–1950; his death)

Edith Wynne Matthison (November 23, 1875 – September 23, 1955) was an Anglo-American stage actress who also appeared in two silent films.

== Early life ==
She was born on November 23, 1875, in England, the daughter of Kate Wynne Matthison and Henry Matthison. Her aunt was Welsh singer Sarah Edith Wynne. Matthison was educated in King Edward's Grammar School and Midland Institute, England.

== Career ==
She began at age 21 to appear in musical comedy, later joining Ben Greet's company, playing leading parts in The Three Musketeers and Money.

Matthison specialized in Shakespeare and classic drama almost from the start of her career. She was acting in the same play, The Merchant of Venice, with Sir Henry Irving the night he died. Irving nearly died in Matthison's arms. She appeared in Greek and mystery plays, old English comedies, and modern plays. In the United States in 1904 she appeared in Goldsmith's She Stoops to Conquer.

== Personal life ==
While at school, Matthison had a romantic relationship with fellow student and later celebrated poet Edna St. Vincent Millay.

Matthison married the playwright Charles Rann Kennedy in 1898, acted in many of his plays, and advised him during their development. A happy couple who enjoyed a long marriage of 50 years, they had no children. They both taught at Bennett Junior College in Millbrook, New York.

At one time her niece, Gladys Edith Wynne, was married to the stage and silent film star Milton Sills.

== Death ==
Matthison died of a stroke in Los Angeles on September 23, 1955.

== Filmography ==
Year	Title	Role	Notes
1915	The Governor's Lady		
1917	National Red Cross Pageant		Prologue, (final film role)
