= Mary Servoss =

American actress

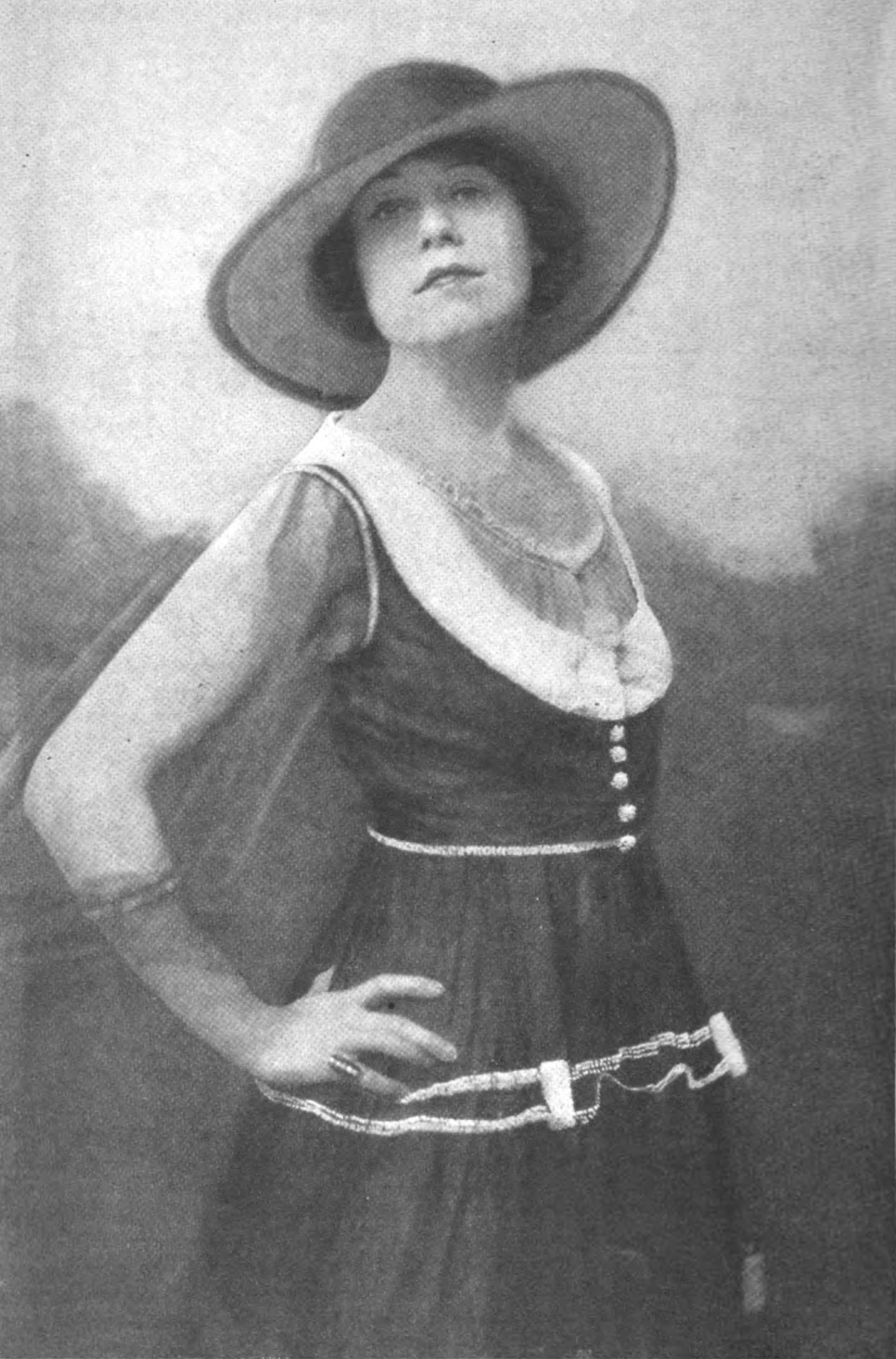
- Born: June 2, 1888; Chicago, Illinois, U.S.
- Died: November 20, 1968 (aged 80); Los Angeles, California, U.S.
- Occupation: Actress
- Years active: 1905–1949

Mary Servoss (June 2, 1888 – November 20, 1968) was an American stage and screen actress. Her main career was centered on the Broadway stage.

== Biography ==
She was born to Carlos A. Servoss and Mary (née Baker) in Chicago. She made her stage debut in 1905 in a stock company playing a small part in Lorna Doone. In 1922, she played Portia to David Warfield's Shylock in The Merchant of Venice, and she appeared in the 1929 play Street Scene, in the 1931 play Counsellor-at-Law starring Paul Muni, and as Queen Gertrude in Hamlet opposite both Raymond Massey (1931) and Leslie Howard (1936).

She was a veteran stage actress when she made her first film in 1940 and made over 20 films by the time of her last film in 1949.

When not in the theatre, her hobby was restoring old farmhouses.

Mary Servoss died in Los Angeles on November 20, 1968.

Her papers are housed in the Charles E. Young Research Library at UCLA. The collection includes "correspondence, photographs, books, scrapbooks, and printed materials related to Servoss' life and career."

== Select stage credits ==
- Bedford's Hope (1906)
- The Master of the House (1912)
- Consequences (1914)
- Upstairs and Down (1916)
- Behold the Bridegroom (1927)
- Street Scene (1929)
- Tortilla Flat (1938)
- Swan Song (1946)
- Medea (1949)

== Filmography ==
Year	Title	Role	Notes
1940	The Lone Wolf Keeps a Date	Mrs. Colby	
1942	All Through the Night	Woman	uncredited
1942	In This Our Life	Charlotte Fitzroy	
1942	The Postman Didn't Ring	Helen Allen	
1943	The Human Comedy	Mrs. Beaufrere	uncredited
1943	So Proudly We Hail!	Capt. 'Ma' McGregor	
1944	Four Jills in a Jeep	Nurse Lieutenant	uncredited
1944	Uncertain Glory	Drover's Wife	uncredited
1944	Summer Storm	Mrs. Kalenin	
1944	Youth Runs Wild	Cora Hauser	
1944	Mrs. Parkington	Mrs. Graham	
1944	Experiment Perilous	Miss Wilson	
1945	Roughly Speaking	Rose the Maid	uncredited
1945	Conflict	Landlady	uncredited
1945	Mildred Pierce	Nurse	uncredited
1945	Danger Signal	Mrs. Fenchurch	
1946	My Reputation	Mary	
1946	A Stolen Life	Practical Nurse	uncredited
1947	High Wall	Martha Ferguson	uncredited
1948	An Act of Murder	Julia	
1949	Beyond the Forest	Mrs. Wetch	uncredited, final film role
