= Ruth Matteson =

American actress

- Born: December 8, 1910; San Jose, California, U.S.
- Died: February 5, 1975 (aged 64); Westport, Connecticut, U.S.
- Occupation: Actress
- Years active: 1934–1967
- Spouses: Arthur Pierson (1937-19??, divorced); Curt Peterson (19??-1975)

Ruth Matteson (December 10, 1910 – February 5, 1975) was an American actress. She appeared in more than 20 Broadway plays and had a variety of television roles.

== Career ==
Matteson began her acting career in San Francisco with the Henry Duffy Players. Her first Broadway role was in Geraniums in My Window in 1934. In 1936 she replaced Doris Nolan as the lead in Night of January 16th. Her role in George Abbott's production of the comedy What a Life led to a regular spot on The Aldrich Family, a radio program based on the play. In 1940 she took the main female role in The Male Animal.

Her only feature film role was in 1938's The Birth of a Baby, directed by Al Christie. In 1948 she began acting on television, appearing on such shows as Actors Studio and Kraft Television Theatre, while continuing to work in Broadway productions. Her final television role was on The Edge of Night from 1962 to 1963, and her last Broadway appearance was in Neil Simon's Barefoot in the Park in 1965.

== Personal life ==
Matteson was born on December 10, 1910, in San Jose, California. She married fellow actor Arthur Pierson in 1937. They later divorced and she married Curt Peterson, an executive with the McCann Erickson advertising agency. She and Peterson lived in Westport, Connecticut, where she died on February 5, 1975.

== Credits ==
=== Broadway ===
- Geraniums in My Window (1934)
- Symphony (1935)
- Parnell (1935)
- Triumph (1935)
- Night of January 16th (1936)
- The Wingless Victory (1936)
- Spring Dance (1936)
- Barchester Towers (193)
- What a Life (1938)
- One For the Money (1939)
- The Male Animal (1940)
- The Merry Widow (1943)
- Tomorrow the World (1943)
- In Bed We Cry (1944)
- Mr. Strauss Goes to Boston (1945)
- Antigone (1946)
- Park Avenue (1946)
- Clutterbuck (1949)
- The Relapse (1950)
- Dragon's Mouth (1955)
- The Happiest Millionaire (1956)
- There Was a Little Girl (1960)
- Barefoot in the Park (1965)

=== Film ===
- The Birth of a Baby (1938)

=== Television ===
- Actors Studio (1948-1949)
- The Philco-Goodyear Television Playhouse (1949-1950)
- Kraft Theatre (1949-1954)
- Armstrong Circle Theatre (1950-1951)
- Musical Comedy Time (1951)
- Fairmeadows, U.S.A. (1951-1952)
- Look Up and Live (1954)
- Ponds Theater (1955)
- The Ed Sullivan Show (1957)
- The Edge of Night (1962-1963)
