= The Governor's Lady =

1912 play by Alice Bradley, David Belasco (director/producer)

The Governor's Lady is a 1912 play written by Alice Bradley, directed by David Belasco and produced by Belasco and his son-in-law David Elliott. It is known for its unconventional set.

== Production ==
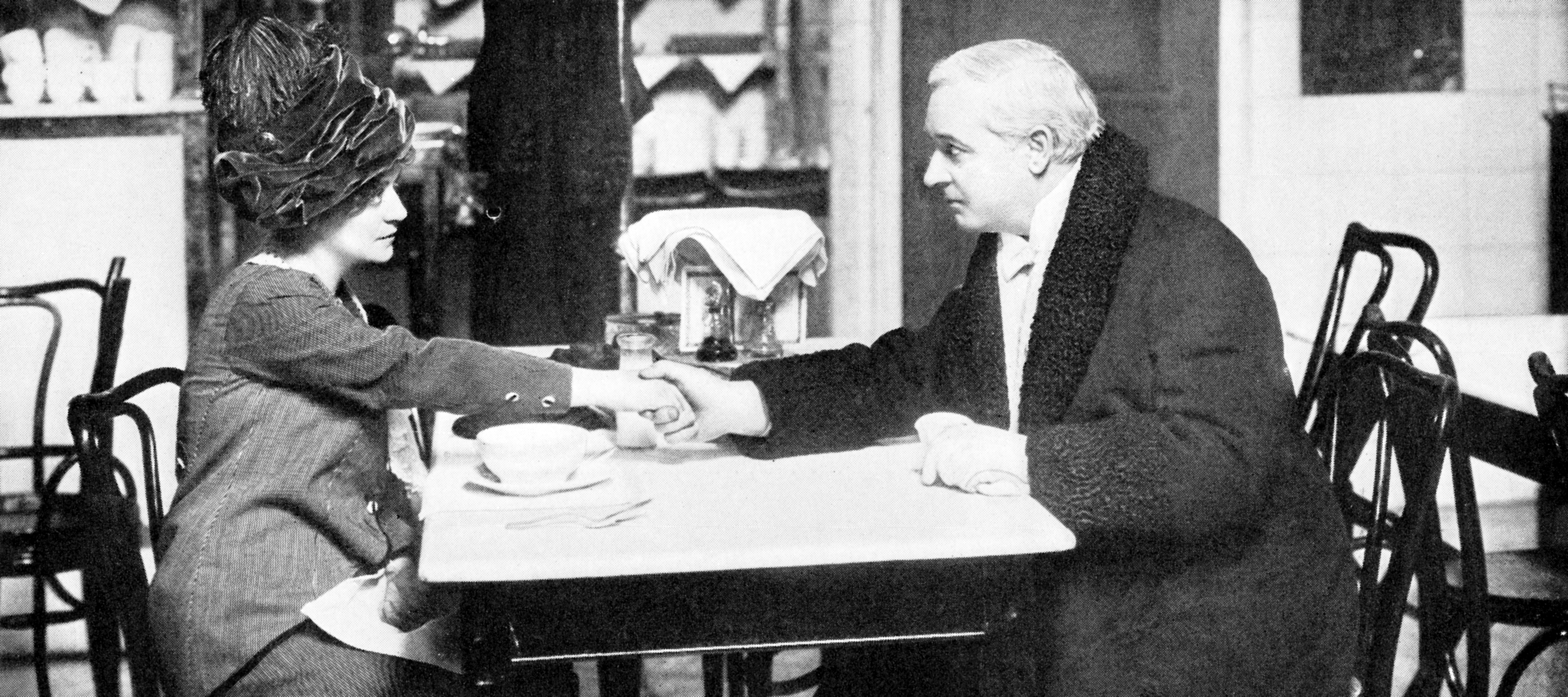
Emma Dunn and Emmett Corrigan in the famous Childs Restaurant scene in The Governor's Lady (1912)

After previews in Philadelphia and Washington The Governor's Lady opened at Belasco's Republic Theatre in New York on September 10, 1912. Emma Dunn and Emmett Corrigan starred as Mary and Dan Slade, Gladys Hanson played Katherine Strickland and Milton Sills played Robert Hayes. The three-act contemporary domestic drama dealt with topics of rising social status and the then-little-discussed topic of divorce. The reasonably well-reviewed and moderately commercially successful play ran 135 performances. It is primarily known as an example of Belasco's theatrical naturalism, because he recreated a Childs Restaurant on stage using materials and food from the actual restaurant chain rather than conventional representative stage scenery.
