= Gene Ruggiero =

American film editor

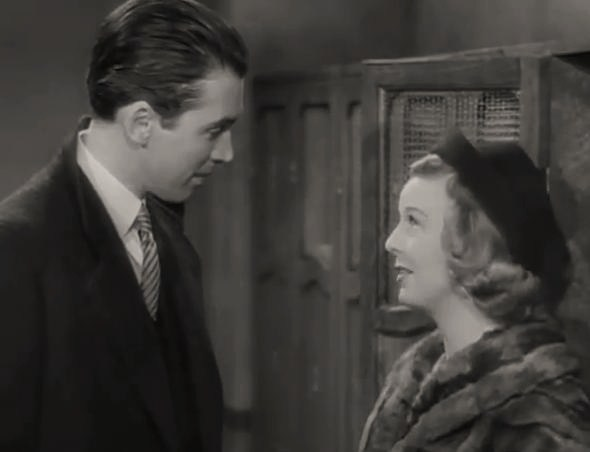
- James Stewart and Margaret Sullavan in The Shop Around the Corner (1940)
- Born: Gene S. Ruggiero; June 20, 1910; Long Island, New York
- Died: February 19, 2002 (aged 91); Ogden, Utah
- Occupation: Film editor
- Spouse: Eva Nohavka (m. 1966; div. 1988)

Gene S. Ruggiero (June 20, 1910 – February 19, 2002) was an American film editor. Originally a golf caddy at an exclusive New York country club, Ruggiero was fired from his job and later went to Metro-Goldwyn-Mayer where he was assigned the job of editing. He was initially unhappy with his job and would often skip working to play golf, demoted to assistant editor due to this.

Ruggiero came to prominence after editing the 1939 film Ninotchka. As nobody else would edit the film due to Ernst Lubitsch's reputation, the job was assigned to Ruggiero. He received his first credit on the film, and continued as an editor for the rest of his career. Ruggiero earned an Academy Award for Best Film Editing in 1956 for his work on Around the World in 80 Days, which he shared with Paul Weatherwax. He was also nominated for an Academy Award in 1955 for his editing on Oklahoma!, which he shared with George Boemler.

== Early life ==
Gene S. Ruggiero was born in Long Island on June 20, 1910, the son of Phillip and Teresa Ruggiero. His parents immigrated to the United States from Naples, Italy in 1903 and his father worked as a skilled mason. He grew up in Manhasset, New York with his seven siblings (Michael, Frank, Joseph, Jack, Ana, Elizabeth, and Mary). During World War II, he served in the army. Ruggiero enjoyed the sport of golf and, before becoming a film editor, he worked as a caddy at a New York country club. Ruggiero often caddied for American film studio executive Nicholas Schenck. On days where Schenck's group was lacking a fourth player, they often invited Ruggiero to play. However, after playing a game with the group one day, Ruggiero returned to the clubhouse find the head angry with him for neglecting his caddy duties. Ruggiero was fired from his job.

== Career ==
Ruggiero approached Schenck, and requested assistance in becoming employed. Since Schenck was head of Metro-Goldwyn-Mayer on the east coast division, he decided to send Ruggiero there, with a letter written by Schenk that would ensure Ruggiero would earn a job at the studio. When Ruggiero arrived, he was assigned the job of film editor. Ruggiero found himself displeased with the menial work, and often did not show up at the studio, choosing to play golf instead. He was demoted to assistant editor when his skipping was found out, and worked on several Johnny Weissmuller films.

Ruggiero received his first film credit in 1939, on the film Ninotchka. Ernst Lubitsch, the director of the film, had a reputation with the studio which made the other editors refuse to cut the film. Ruggiero was picked as the last option. The film brought Ruggiero to prominence and he worked as a main editor for the rest of his career. After Ninotchka, he edited Richard Thorpe's action film Tarzan Finds a Son! with Frank Sullivan, while editing the comedy Joe and Ethel Turp Call on the President by himself.

In 1940, he edited The Shop Around the Corner, another Lubitsch film. Two Dr. Kildare films Strange Case and Crisis were also edited by Ruggiero this year, along with the George B. Seitz film Sky Murder and W. S. Van Dyke's comedy I Love You Again. The next year saw Ruggiero edit Blonde Inspiration by Busby Berkeley and Washington Melodrama by S. Sylvan Simon. He also cut another Tarzan picture by Thorpe entitled Tarzan's Secret Treasure. Ruggiero edited the 1942 films A Yank on the Burma Road, Tarzan's New York Adventure, Andy Hardy's Double Life, and Jackass Mail. His next credit came in 1946 on the film Three Wise Fools, which he co-edited with Theron Warth. He edited the actor Robert Montgomery's Lady in the Lake in 1947. That same year, Ruggiero was the editor for Edward Buzzell's Song of the Thin Man, and the final Dr. Kildare film Dark Delusion.

Big City was Ruggerio's only 1948 credit. He served as editor for The Bribe the following year, as well as That Midnight Kiss; Ruggerio remembered that the film's star Mario Lanza would not do a film unless Ruggerio would edit it. In 1950 he cut Stars in My Crown and The Toast of New Orleans. The following year he was the editor for Lanza's film The Great Caruso, as well as Norman Taurog's Rich, Young and Pretty and John Sturges' The People Against O'Hara. The 1952 film Glory Alley was Ruggierio's next credit, and in 1953 the films The Clown, Rogue's March, and Easy to Love were edited by him. He edited Men of the Fighting Lady, Athena, and The Student Prince in the following year. Along with George Boemler, Ruggiero edited the 1955 film Oklahoma!. Ruggiero earned his first Academy Award for Best Editing nomination for his work on the film; he and Boemler lost to William A. Lyon and Charles Nelson for Picnic.

I told [Todd] to go away for two weeks and leave us alone. And then we cut the monster down to something that made sense.

— Ruggiero on the editing process of Around the World in 80 Days.

In 1956 he edited The Catered Affair alongside Frank Santillo, and Around the World in 80 Days with Howard Epstein and Paul Weatherwax. Ruggiero and Weatherwax won the Academy Award for Best Film Editing. The Oscar statuette Ruggiero earned for his work on the film was tarnished; its gold coat was removed when Ruggiero sent it out for cleansing and he never had it replated when he was able to afford doing so. Ruggiero said in March 1994 that he considered the film his best work.

The films Ruggiero edited in 1957 were The Seventh Sin and Seven Hills of Rome. He also edited John Ford's The Wings of Eagles that year. Ruggiero recalled Ford as a "cheapskate" and that he offered Ruggiero a new putter to appease him. The following year, he edited Torpedo Run, and in 1959 he edited For the First Time and Tarzan, the Ape Man. In 1960, Ruggiero did Platinum High School and Revak the Rebel, and edited The Thief of Bagdad and The Wonders of Aladdin the next year. His next credit came on the film The Last Man on Earth, released in 1964, which he edited with Franca Silvi. That year he also edited Panic Button and Dog Eat Dog.

Ruggiero's next film was Cast a Giant Shadow by Melville Shavelson which was released it 1966; he edited the film alongside Bert Bates. He edited Marlowe and Hell's Angels '69 in 1969, and was supervising editor on the TV Show H.R. Pufnstuf, he edited Noon Sunday and was an associate producer on Kemek both in 1970, in 1972 he served as editor on William Girdler's Asylum of Satan. In 1973 he edited Bert I. Gordon's The Police Connection, as well as a post-production supervisor on Running Wild and 2 episodes of Bob & Carol & Ted & Alice (TV Series), The 1974 television pilot Wonder Woman was his next credit; he also edited Black Eye that same year. He edited the 1975 film Boss Nigger; as well as Paesano: A Voice in the Night that same year, he also worked with his wife Eva on 1976's Adiós Amigo. He worked on The World through the Eyes of Children in 1975 and in 1976 he worked on the short Circasia and Paco, In 1977. Ruggiero's next editing credit for came in 1977 for his work on Gus Trikonis' Moonshine County Express.

Ruggiero was supervising editor on William Girdler's last film The Manitou in 1978, He edited one episode each of the 1979 series Billy and the 1980 TV Show Breaking Away, He was Supervising Editor on Savage Journey a 1983 TV re-edit of a 1977 film Brigham, he was an associate producer on the 1985 Low-Budget cult classic Night Train to Terror and co-producer on 1987's Cry Wilderness.

Ruggiero's final editing credit came on the 1988 low budget film Bloody Wednesday.

Ruggiero was elected as a member of the American Cinema Editors. In 1994, he earned an American Cinema Editors Career Achievement Award, presented by Martin Scorsese. He criticized the low amount of money he was being paid each year; in 1994 the Motion Picture Industry Pension Plan was only giving him $242.71 a month - by contrast, younger editors were earning around $1,250. Ruggiero believed that since he had worked his whole life in the film industry, he was owed a higher amount.

== Personal life ==
Ruggiero married Eva Nohavka in Italy on April 9, 1966. They divorced in 1988. By 1994, Eva had brought Gene back to live with her. By this time, he had been suffering from herpes zoster and nearly all of his teeth were missing. He then lived in Ogden, Utah for four years before his death on February 19, 2002. Ruggiero is survived by his two children and four grandchildren. His seven siblings have all since passed.

== Filmography ==
Year	Title	Director	Notes
1939	Ninotchka	Ernst Lubitsch	
1939	Tarzan Finds a Son!	Richard Thorpe	With Frank Sullivan
1939	Joe and Ethel Turp Call on the President	Robert B. Sinclair	
1940	The Shop Around the Corner	Ernst Lubitsch	
1940	Dr. Kildare's Strange Case	Harold S. Bucquet	
1940	I Love You Again	W. S. Van Dyke	
1940	Sky Murder	George B. Seitz	
1940	Dr. Kildare's Crisis	Harold S. Bucquet	
1941	Blonde Inspiration	Busby Berkeley	
1941	Washington Melodrama	S. Sylvan Simon	
1941	Tarzan's Secret Treasure	Richard Thorpe	
1942	A Yank on the Burma Road	George B. Seitz	
1942	Tarzan's New York Adventure	Richard Thorpe	
1942	Andy Hardy's Double Life	George B. Seitz	
1942	Jackass Mail	Norman Z. McLeod	
1946	Three Wise Fools	Edward Buzzell	With Theron Warth
1947	Lady in the Lake	Robert Montgomery	
1947	Dark Delusion	Willis Goldbeck	
1947	Song of the Thin Man	Edward Buzzell	
1948	Big City	Norman Taurog	
1949	The Bribe	Robert Z. Leonard	
1949	That Midnight Kiss	Norman Taurog	
1950	Stars in My Crown	Jacques Tourneur	
1950	The Toast of New Orleans	Norman Taurog	
1951	The Great Caruso	Richard Thorpe	
1951	Rich, Young and Pretty	Norman Taurog	
1951	The People Against O'Hara	John Sturges	
1952	Glory Alley	Raoul Walsh	
1953	The Clown	Robert Z. Leonard	
1953	Rogue's March	Allan Davis	
1953	Easy to Love	Charles Walters	
1954	Men of the Fighting Lady	Andrew Marton	
1954	The Student Prince	Richard Thorpe	
1954	Athena	Richard Thorpe	
1955	Oklahoma!	Fred Zinnemann	With George Boemler; Nomination: Academy Award for Best Film Editing
1956	The Catered Affair	Richard Brooks	With Frank Santillo
1956	Around the World in 80 Days	Michael Anderson	With Howard Epstein and Paul Weatherwax; Won: Academy Award for Best Film Editing
1956	The Great American Pastime	Herman Hoffman	
1957	The Wings of Eagles	John Ford	
1957	The Seventh Sin	Ronald Neame	
1957	Seven Hills of Rome	Roy Rowland	
1958	Torpedo Run	Joseph Pevney	
1959	For the First Time	Rudolph Maté	
1959	Tarzan, the Ape Man	Joseph M. Newman	
1960	Platinum High School	Charles F. Haas	
1960	Revak the Rebel	Rudolph Maté	
1961	The Thief of Bagdad	Arthur Lubin	
1961	The Wonders of Aladdin	Henry Levin; Mario Bava	
1964	The Last Man on Earth	Ubaldo Ragona; Sidney Salkow	With Franca Silvi
1964	Panic Button	George Sherman	
1964	Dog Eat Dog	Richard E. Cunha; Gustav Gavrin; Ray Nazarro; Albert Zugsmith	
1966	Cast a Giant Shadow	Melville Shavelson	With Bert Bates
1969	Marlowe	Paul Bogart	
1969	Hell's Angels '69	Lee Madden	
1970	Noon Sunday	Terry Bourke	
1970	Kemek	Theodore Gershuny	Associate Producer
1972	Asylum of Satan	William Girdler	
1973	The Mad Bomber	Bert I. Gordon	
1973	Running Wild	Robert McCahon	Post Production Supervisor
1974	Wonder Woman	Vincent McEveety	
1974	Black Eye	Jack Arnold	
1975	Paesano: A Voice in the Night	John Myers, Martin Ragway, Jack Brooks and Alberto Sarno	Short Film
1975	Boss Nigger	Jack Arnold	With Eva Ruggiero
1975	The World through the Eyes of Children	Jimmie Rodgers; Bob Williams	
1976	Adiós Amigo	Fred Williamson	With Eva Ruggiero
1976	Paco	Robert O'Neil	
1976	Circasia	Brian MacLochlainn and John McColgan	Short Film
1977	Moonshine County Express	Gus Trikonis	
1978	The Manitou	William Girdler	Supervising Editor
1983	Savage Journey	Tom McGowan	Supervising Editor
1985	Night Train to Terror	Jay Schlossberg-Cohen, John Carr, Phillip Marshak and Gregg C. Tallas	Associate Producer
1987	Cry Wilderness	Jay Schlossberg-Cohen	Co-Producer
1988	Bloody Wednesday	Mark G. Gilhuis	Film Editor and Post-Production Supervisor

TV Shows

H.R. Pufnstuf 1969-1970 17 Episodes Supervising Editor

Bob & Carol & Ted & Alice TV Series 1973 2 Episodes

Billy 1979 1 Episode

Breaking Away TV Series 1980 1 Episode
