= Between Two Women (1945 film) =

1945 film by Willis Goldbeck

- Theatrical release poster
- Directed by: Willis Goldbeck
- Written by: Max Brand; Harry Ruskin
- Produced by: Carey Wilson
- Starring: Lionel Barrymore; Van Johnson; Gloria DeHaven
- Cinematography: Harold Rosson
- Edited by: Adrienne Fazan
- Music by: David Snell
- Distributed by: Metro-Goldwyn-Mayer
- Release date: March 28, 1945
- Running time: 83 minutes
- Country: United States
- Language: English
- Budget: $436,000
- Box office: $2,282,000

Between Two Women is a 1945 American drama film directed by Willis Goldbeck. The film was the sixteenth film in the Dr. Kildare series. It was the fourteenth of fifteen in which Lionel Barrymore starred as Dr. Leonard B. Gillespie. The film following was Dark Delusion (1947), which was the last in the Dr. Kildare series released by Metro-Goldwyn-Mayer (MGM). This was the last of Van Johnson's character, Dr. Randall 'Red' Adams, also seen in three previous Kildare films.

== Plot ==
This episode in the series should have been called Between Three Women, because there are plot strands involving three, not two, women. Dr. Gillespie's assistant, Dr. Red Adams, is still fending off the romantic advances of beautiful blond socialite and social worker Ruth Edley, who finally succeeds in winning Red's heart. The second woman is a pretty night club singer Edna, who collapses suddenly one night after a show and cannot understand why she is no longer able to eat. Red finds out that a complicated subconscious obsession is the cause. The third woman is Sally, the reliable and wise-cracking switchboard operator in all of the episodes. Sally is stricken with Bright's Disease and refuses to let anyone besides Red operate on her ailing kidney. Things turn out well for Red and all three women.

There are some scenes in the singer's night club that draw inspiration from the country's immersion in the Second World War. As part of a "home front" money raising contest to help the war effort, Ruth bids extravagant amounts of money for the chance to kiss Red in public.

== Cast ==
- Van Johnson as Dr. Randall 'Red' Adams
- Lionel Barrymore as Dr. Leonard B. Gillespie
- Marilyn Maxwell as Ruth Edley
- Gloria DeHaven as Edna
- Keenan Wynn as Tobey
- Keye Luke as Dr. Lee Wong How aka Dr. Lee
- Alma Kruger as Nurse Molly Byrd
- Walter Kingsford as Dr. Walter Carew
- Marie Blake as Sally
- Nell Craig as Nurse 'Nosey' Parker
- Shirley Patterson as Nurse Thorsen
- Edna Holland as Nurse Morgan
- Lorraine Miller as Marion
- Eddie Acuff as Orderly
- Tom Trout as Eddie Smith

== Production ==
The draft script included a plotline involving twin sisters, one of whom is pregnant, that Dr. Adams and Dr. Gillespie believe are the same person. The doctors describe various tests in a comedic competition to prove whether she is pregnant. After reviewing the script, the Motion Picture Producers and Distributors of America, which enforced the Hays Code, objected to details about pregnancy and pregnancy tests. To avoid any financial impact from a rejection of the finished film, MGM eliminated the twins plotline in a script rewrite.

== Reception ==
According to MGM records the movie was the most popular in the series yet, in part because of the rising popularity of Van Johnson. The film earned $1,896,000 in the United States and Canada, and $386,000 elsewhere, making a profit of $1,184,000, a remarkable figure for a B movie.
