= Dr. Kildare Goes Home =

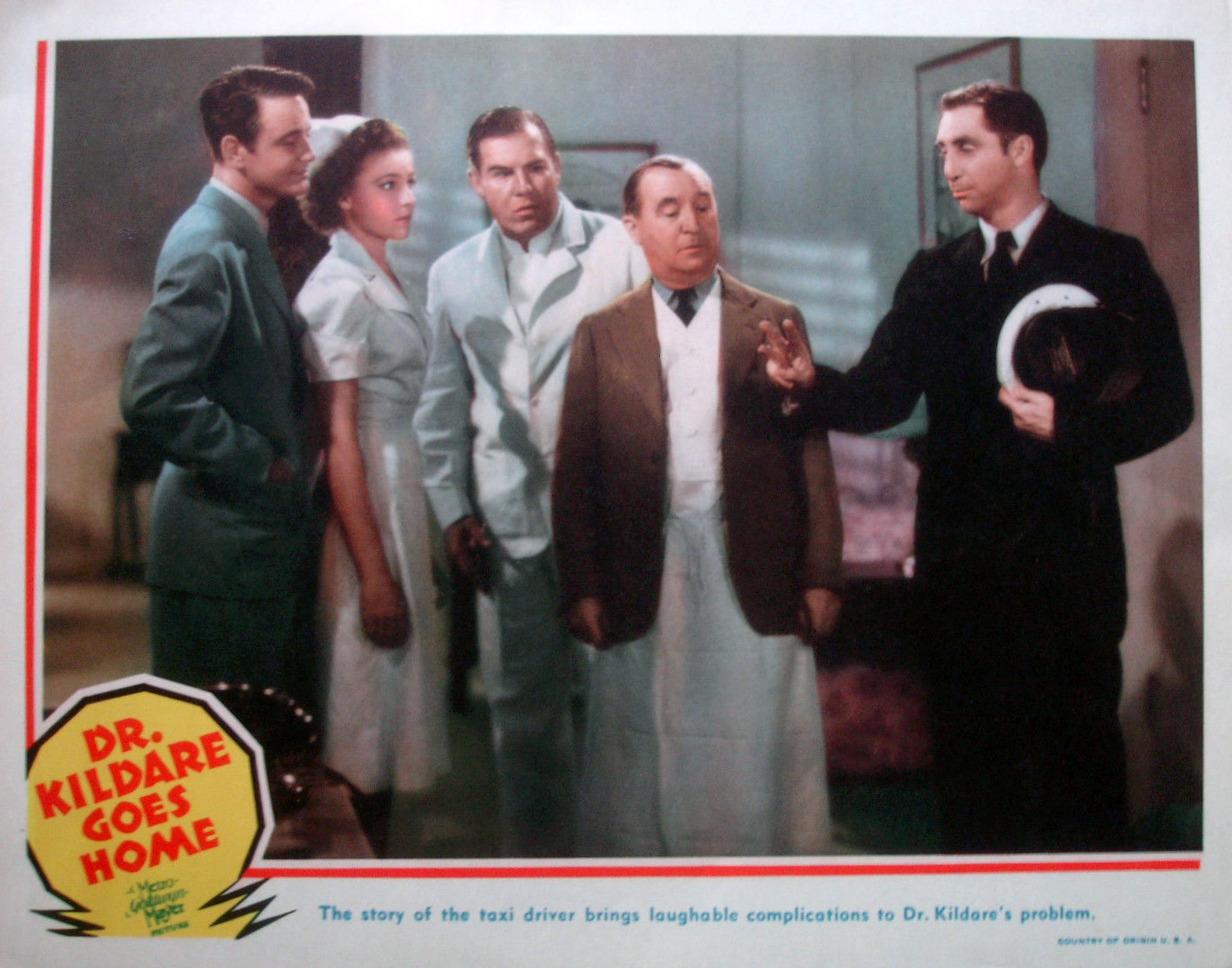
- Lobby card
- Directed by: Harold S. Bucquet
- Written by: Harry Ruskin (screenplay); Willis Goldbeck (screenplay); Max Brand (story); Willis Goldbeck (story)
- Starring: Lew Ayres; Lionel Barrymore; Laraine Day
- Cinematography: Harold Rosson
- Edited by: Howard O'Neill
- Music by: David Snell
- Production company: Metro-Goldwyn-Mayer
- Distributed by: Loew's Inc.
- Release date: September 6, 1940
- Running time: 79 minutes
- Country: United States
- Language: English

Dr. Kildare Goes Home is a 1940 American drama film directed by Harold S. Bucquet, starring Lew Ayres, Lionel Barrymore and Laraine Day. It is the fifth in the MGM series of nine films with Lew Ayres as Dr. Kildare made from 1938–1942.

== Plot ==
Upon the completion of their internships, the young physicians of Blair General Hospital are sent out into the world. Dr. James Kildare is appointed as a resident staff physician under his mentor, the eminent but cranky diagnostician Dr. Leonard Gillespie. Calling his mother to announce the news, he becomes worried about his parents because of her lack of enthusiasm.

Kildare returns to his home town of Dartford, Connecticut and discovers that his father Stephen, a smalltown physician, is in failing health due to the strain of attending patients in nearby Parkersville, where poor economic conditions have forced the doctors there to abandon their practices. Kildare volunteers to help out with a few cases but because of his age and inexperience is not well accepted. His instinctive talents as a diagnostician makes Kildare suspect that one of them, George Winslow, is denying some secret affliction. Kildare decides to stay on as his father's assistant, which upsets Gillespie but still receives the mentor's approval.

Torn between pursuing his own career and saving his father's health, Kildare conceives of the idea of establishing a community clinic where, at a cost of ten-cents-per-week and using preventive medicine, patients can avail themselves of medical services offered by three young doctors without positions who agree to join the project. Gillespie helps Kildare by procuring basic medical supplies from his hospital and donating them to the Parkersville clinic. However, the ignorance and prejudice of the people of Parkersville, led by the obstinate Winslow, make them equally skeptical of the new clinic as they were of Kildare.

He soon finds the enterprise jeopardized, the townspeople about to vote on its future. Kildare tricks Winslow into a blood test, and consulting Gilespie, suspects Winslow has contracted meningitis from daily swims in a nearby lake. His father concurs with the diagnosis but Winslow rejects further treatment. Certain now that the clinic will fail, Kildare elopes with Mary, but does not get very far before he is called back to attend to Winslow, who has collapsed. Kildare saves Winslow and with his support, wins over the townspeople, who now realize the value of the clinic. His father is able to take a long rest, while his son returns to New York to wed Mary and take his post with Gillespie.

== Cast ==
- Lew Ayres as Dr. James Kildare
- Lionel Barrymore as Dr. Leonard Gillespie
- Laraine Day as Mary Lamont
- Samuel S. Hinds as Dr. Stephen Kildare
- Gene Lockhart as George Winslow
- John Shelton as Dr. Davidson
- Nat Pendleton as Wayman
- Emma Dunn as Mrs. Martha Kildare
- Alma Kruger as Molly Byrd
- Walter Kingsford as Dr. Walter Carew
- Nell Craig as Nurse "Nosey" Parker
- Cliff Danielson as Dr. Jordan
- Henry Wadsworth as Dr. Collins
- Tom Collins as Dr. Joiner
- George Reed as Conover (as George H. Reed)
- Archie Twitchell as Bates

== Production ==
MGM produced nine Dr. Kildare movies:

- Dr. Kildare's Victory (1942) Played by Lew Ayres (as Dr. James 'Jimmy' Kildare)
- Dr. Kildare's Wedding Day (1941) Played by Samuel S. Hinds (as Dr. Stephen Kildare) / Lew Ayres (as Dr. James 'Jimmy' Kildare)
- The People vs. Dr. Kildare (1941) Played by Lew Ayres
- Dr. Kildare's Crisis (1940) Played by Lew Ayres (as Dr. James 'Jimmy' Kildare)
- Dr. Kildare Goes Home (1940) Played by Lew Ayres / Samuel S. Hinds (as Dr. Stephen Kildare)
- Dr. Kildare's Strange Case (1940) Played by Samuel S. Hinds (as Dr. Stephen Kildare) / Lew Ayres (as Dr. James 'Jimmy' Kildare)
- The Secret of Dr. Kildare (1939) Played by Samuel S. Hinds (as Dr. Stephen Kildare) / Lew Ayres (as Dr. James 'Jimmy' Kildare)
- Calling Dr. Kildare (1939) Played by Samuel S. Hinds (as Dr. Stephen Kildare)
- Young Dr. Kildare (1938) Played by Lew Ayres / Samuel S. Hinds (as Dr. Stephen Kildare)
