= Frank Orth =

American actor (1880–1962)

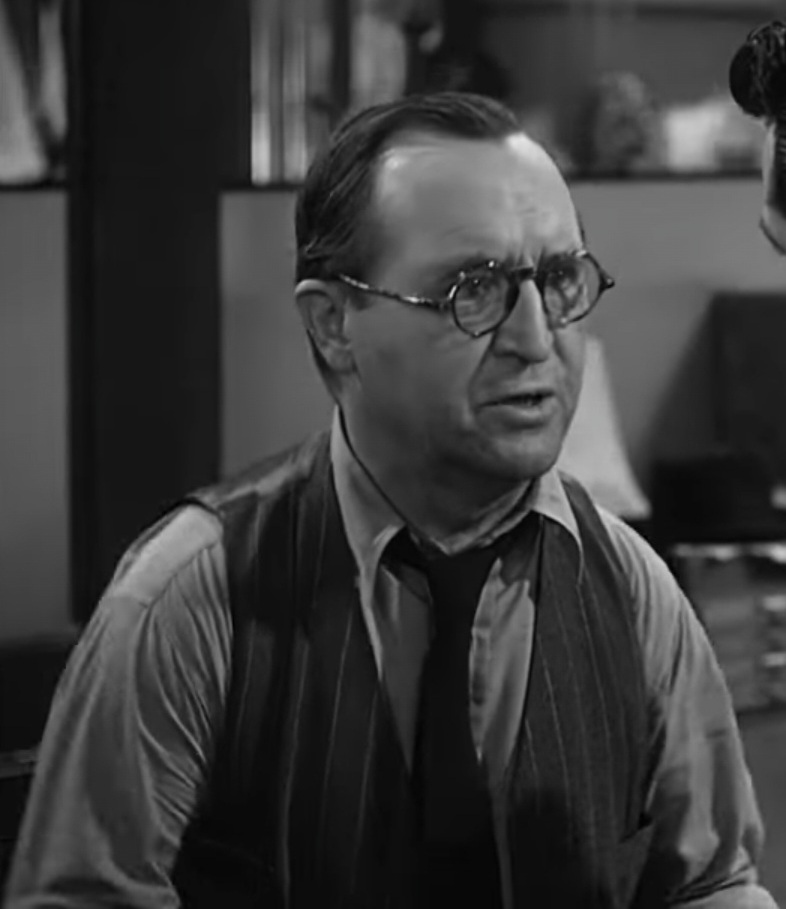
- Orth in His Girl Friday (1940)
- Born: February 21, 1880; Philadelphia, Pennsylvania, U.S.
- Died: March 17, 1962 (aged 82); Hollywood, California, U.S.
- Resting place: Forest Lawn Memorial Park, Hollywood Hills
- Occupation: Actor
- Years active: 1928–1959
- Spouse: Ann Codee (m. 1911; died 1961)
- Children: 2

Frank Orth (February 21, 1880 – March 17, 1962) was an American actor. He is probably best remembered for his portrayal of Inspector Faraday in the 1951-1953 television series Boston Blackie.

== Career ==
Orth was born in Philadelphia to a family that did not include professional entertainers. When he was 8 years old, he said that he wanted to be a "wandering minstrel". He attended Thaddeus Stevens School in Philadelphia.

By 1897, he was performing in vaudeville with his wife, Ann Codee, in an act called "Codee and Orth". In 1909, he expanded into song writing, with songs such as "The Phone Bell Rang" and "Meet Me on the Boardwalk, Dearie". Orth did not know how to read or write music notes, so he hummed his compositions while skilled music writers put them on paper.

His first contact with motion pictures was in 1928, when he was part of the first foreign-language shorts in sound produced by Warner Bros. He and his wife also appeared together in a series of two-reel comedies in the early 1930s. Orth's first major screen credit was in Prairie Thunder, a Dick Foran western, in 1937. From then on, he was often cast as bartenders, pharmacists, and grocery clerks.

He had a recurring role in the Dr. Kildare series of films and also in the Nancy Drew series as the befuddled Officer Tweedy. Among his better roles were the newspaper man Cary Grant telephones early in His Girl Friday, one of the quartet singing "Gary Owen" in They Died with Their Boots On (thereby giving Errol Flynn as Gen. Custer the idea of associating the tune with the 7th Cavalry), and as the little man carrying the sign reading "The End Is Near" throughout Colonel Effingham's Raid. However, Orth is probably best remembered for his portrayal of Inspector Faraday in the 1951-1953 television series Boston Blackie. A short, plump, round-faced man, often smoking a cigar, Orth as Faraday wore his own dark-rimmed spectacles, though rarely in feature films.

Orth took a position in radio in the fall of 1947 when he became production director with Sun Country Broadcasting Company in Arizona.

== Personal life and death ==
In 1911 Orth married Ann Codee (born Ann Van Huffelen), whom he had met in 1909 when they were in acts on the same bill in vaudeville. In 1959, Orth retired from show business after throat surgery. His wife died in 1961 after around fifty years of marriage. Orth died on March 17, 1962. He is buried in Forest Lawn Cemetery in the Hollywood Hills next to his wife.

== Selected filmography ==
- The Painter (1931)
- Sleepy Head (1931)
- Dumb Luck (1931)
- The Unwelcome Stranger (1935) - Jackson
- The Payoff (1935) - Porter (uncredited)
- Two Against the World (1936) - Tommy - Bartender
- Hot Money (1936) - Hank Ford
- Polo Joe (1936) - Bert
- Land Beyond the Law (1937) - Deputy Shorty Long
- San Quentin (1937) - Convict in Bunkhouse (uncredited)
- Fly-Away Baby (1937) - Newsreel Reporter at Airport (uncredited)
- Ever Since Eve (1937) - Cocktail Waiter (uncredited)
- Marry the Girl (1937) - Barman (uncredited)
- Talent Scout (1937) - Burlesque Theatre Manager (uncredited)
- The Devil's Saddle Legion (1937) - Judge Barko
- The Footloose Heiress (1937) - Justice Abner Cuttler
- Prairie Thunder (1937) - Wichita
- Submarine D-1 (1937) - Roseland Waiter (uncredited)
- Missing Witnesses (1937) - Gordon (uncredited)
- The Patient in Room 18 (1938) - Joe Higgins
- Torchy Blane in Panama (1938) - First Leopard (uncredited)
- Flight into Nowhere (1938) - Hammond's Associate (uncredited)
- Little Miss Thoroughbred (1938) - Justice of the Peace (uncredited)
- Mr. Chump (1938) - Sheriff Frank Hinton
- Young Dr. Kildare (1938) - Mike Ryan (uncredited)
- Nancy Drew, Detective (1938) - Captain Tweedy
- Comet Over Broadway (1938) - Cab Driver (uncredited)
- Burn 'Em Up O'Connor (1939) - Tim 'Mac' McKelvy
- Idiot's Delight (1939) - Benny Zinsser (uncredited)
- Fast and Loose (1939) - Detective Hendricks (uncredited)
- Nancy Drew... Reporter (1939) - Capt. Tweedy (uncredited)
- Within the Law (1939) - Jim Jenks
- Society Lawyer (1939) - Man in Outer Law Office (uncredited)
- Winner Take All (1939) - Pete - Bettor (uncredited)
- Broadway Serenade (1939) - Mr. Fellows
- Calling Dr. Kildare (1939) - Mike Sullivan - Hospital Cafe Owner (uncredited)
- Tell No Tales (1939) - Vic - Bartender (uncredited)
- Young Mr. Lincoln (1939) - Loafer (uncredited)
- Stanley and Livingstone (1939) - Newspaperman with Pills (uncredited)
- Nancy Drew and the Hidden Staircase (1939) - Captain Tweedy
- Thunder Afloat (1939) - Old Sailor in Bilge Area (uncredited)
- Dust Be My Destiny (1939) - Wedding Witness on Stage (uncredited)
- Fast and Furious (1939) - Captain Joe Burke
- At the Circus (1939) - Cook in Diner (uncredited)
- The Secret of Dr. Kildare (1939) - Mike Sullivan
- His Girl Friday (1940) - Duffy
- Dr. Kildare's Strange Case (1940) - Mike Ryan, Sullivan's Hospital Cafe
- 'Til We Meet Again (1940) - Hong Kong Bartender (uncredited)
- The Doctor Takes a Wife (1940) - New York Editor (uncredited)
- La Conga Nights (1940) - Dennis O'Brien
- Florian (1940) - Detective (uncredited)
- Brother Orchid (1940) - Waiter at Fat Dutchy's (uncredited)
- Gold Rush Maisie (1940) - Harris
- Pier 13 (1940) - Dead Pan Charlie
- Boom Town (1940) - Barber
- Dr. Kildare Goes Home (1940) - Mike Ryan (uncredited)
- The Bride Wore Crutches (1940) - Bartender (uncredited)
- Mexican Spitfire Out West (1940) - Window Washer (uncredited)
- Gallant Sons (1940) - Newspaper Foreman (uncredited)
- Father Is a Prince (1940) - Drugstore Proprietor
- Dr. Kildare's Crisis (1940) - Mike Ryan, Cafe Owner
- Michael Shayne, Private Detective (1940) - Steve
- Let's Make Music (1941) - Mr. Botts
- Come Live with Me (1941) - Jerry
- The Strawberry Blonde (1941) - Baxter - Livery Stable Owner (uncredited)
- Road Show (1941) - Joe - Lion Owner (uncredited)
- Ride on Vaquero (1941) - Auctioneer (uncredited)
- The People vs. Dr. Kildare (1941) - Mike Ryan
- The Great American Broadcast (1941) - Counter Man
- Broadway Limited (1941) - Lew, Roundhouse Cafe Owner (uncredited)
- Sergeant York (1941) - Drummer (uncredited)
- Kisses for Breakfast (1941) - T.C. Barrett, the Hobo (uncredited)
- Dr. Kildare's Wedding Day (1941) - Mike Ryan
- Navy Blues (1941) - Joe (uncredited)
- I Wake Up Screaming (1941) - Cemetery Caretaker
- They Died with Their Boots On (1941) - Barfly (uncredited)
- Skylark (1941) - Subway Cashier (uncredited)
- Unholy Partners (1941) - Shino McGoon (uncredited)
- Blue, White and Perfect (1942) - Mr. Toby
- Right to the Heart (1942) - Pete
- Dr. Kildare's Victory (1942) - Mike Ryan
- Roxie Hart (1942) - Idler (uncredited)
- Rings on Her Fingers (1942) - Kellogg
- To the Shores of Tripoli (1942) - The Barber (uncredited)
- My Gal Sal (1942) - McGuiness
- Henry and Dizzy (1942) - Joe McGuire
- The Magnificent Dope (1942) - Messenger
- Little Tokyo, U.S.A. (1942) - Jerry
- Footlight Serenade (1942) - Mike the stage doorman
- Tales of Manhattan (1942) - Secondhand Clothes Dealer (Rogers sequence)
- Orchestra Wives (1942) - Rex Willet
- Springtime in the Rockies (1942) - Mr. Bickel (uncredited)
- Dr. Gillespie's New Assistant (1942) - Mike Ryan
- Over My Dead Body (1942) - Detective
- The Meanest Man in the World (1943) - NYC Bartender (uncredited)
- Hello, Frisco, Hello (1943) - Lou, Bartender at Sharkey's
- The Ox-Bow Incident (1943) - Larry Kinkaid (uncredited)
- Coney Island (1943) - Saloon Waiter / Member of quartette, 'Irish' number (uncredited)
- Sweet Rosie O'Grady (1943) - Taxi Driver
- Buffalo Bill (1944) - Sherman - Shooting Gallery Owner
- Roger Touhy, Gangster (1944) - Comic in Theater (uncredited)
- Summer Storm (1944) - Cafe Maitre d' at End (uncredited)
- Wilson (1944) - Smith (uncredited)
- The Impatient Years (1944) - Counterman (uncredited)
- Greenwich Village (1944) - Ordway (uncredited)
- Tall in the Saddle (1944) - 'Shorty' Davis (uncredited)
- Storm Over Lisbon (1944) - Murgatroyd
- Carolina Blues (1944) - Cab Driver (uncredited)
- The Captain from Köpenick (completed in 1941, released in 1945) - Knoll, the Factory Personnel Manager
- Pillow to Post (1945) - Clayfield Taxi Driver
- Wonder Man (1945) - Charlie - the Bartender (uncredited)
- Tell It to a Star (1945) - Augustus T. Goodman
- The Lost Weekend (1945) - Opera Cloak Room Attendant
- The Dolly Sisters (1945) - Stage Manager at The Bijou (uncredited)
- She Went to the Races (1945) - Bartender Skelly
- Doll Face (1945) - Peters
- Colonel Effingham's Raid (1946) - Wild Man (uncredited)
- The Hoodlum Saint (1946) - Chronicle Editor (uncredited)
- Blondie's Lucky Day (1946) - Shaving Kit Salesman (uncredited)
- Murder in the Music Hall (1946) - Henderson, the Stage Manager
- The Bride Wore Boots (1946) - Judge (uncredited)
- The Well-Groomed Bride (1946) - Waiter (uncredited)
- The Strange Love of Martha Ivers (1946) - Hotel Clerk
- It's Great to Be Young (1946) - Franklin Johnson
- Wake Up and Dream (1946) - Milkman (uncredited)
- The Show-Off (1946) - Mr. Kopec - Superintendent (uncredited)
- Lady in the Lake (1946) - Floyd Greer (uncredited)
- Born to Speed (1947) - Breezy Bradley
- The Guilt of Janet Ames (1947) - Danny
- Heartaches (1947) - Mike Connelly, Vic's Agent
- Mother Wore Tights (1947) - Stage Doorman (uncredited)
- Gas House Kids in Hollywood (1947) - Police Captain
- It Had to Be You (1947) - Train Conductor Brown
- The Big Clock (1948) - Burt
- Fury at Furnace Creek (1948) - Evans (uncredited)
- So This Is New York (1948) - A.J. Gluskoter
- The Girl from Manhattan (1948) - Oscar Newsome
- Family Honeymoon (1948) - Candy Butcher (uncredited)
- Blondie's Secret (1948) - Mr. Philpotts
- Make Believe Ballroom(1949) - Pop (uncredited)
- Red Light (1949) - Stoner
- Bride for Sale (1949) - Police Sergeant (uncredited)
- The Great Rupert (1950) - Mr. Frank Dingle
- Cheaper by the Dozen (1950) - Higgins (uncredited)
- Father of the Bride (1950) - Joe
- The Petty Girl (1950) - Moody
- Double Dynamite (1951) - Mr. Kofer
- Something to Live For (1952) - Waiter (uncredited)
- Houdini (1953) - Mr. Hunter
- Here Come the Girls (1953) - Mr. Hungerford
- Not as a Stranger (1955) - Greenville Patient (uncredited)
- Hold That Hypnotist (1957) - Beedle - Man in Library (uncredited)
