= Dr. Gillespie's Criminal Case =

1943 film by Willis Goldbeck

- Directed by: Willis Goldbeck
- Written by: Harry Ruskin; Martin Berkeley; Lawrence P. Bachmann
- Starring: Van Johnson; Lionel Barrymore; Keye Luke; Margaret O'Brien
- Cinematography: Norbert Brodine
- Edited by: Frank E. Hull; Laurie Vejar
- Music by: Daniele Amfitheatrof
- Production company: Metro-Goldwyn-Mayer
- Distributed by: Loews Inc.
- Release date: May 8, 1943
- Running time: 89 minutes
- Country: United States
- Language: English
- Budget: $340,000
- Box office: $782,000

Dr. Gillespie's Criminal Case is a 1943 film in the Dr. Kildare series. Based on characters created by Max Brand. The third of MGM's Dr. Gillespie series (6 in all) to dispense with the services of Dr. Kildare (Lew Ayres) (8 in all) after Dr. Kildare's Victory (1942).

== Plot ==
The film follows three separate and unrelated stories, told more or less simultaneously.

The first involves Roy Todwell, who was introduced in “Calling Dr. Gillespie” (1942), where he was diagnosed as insane after killing three people and threatening to kill Dr. Gillespie. Despite the diagnosis and Dr. Gillespie’s testimony at his trial, he was sentenced to life in prison for murder. Dr. Gillespie believes he should be in a psychiatric institution where his insanity can be treated and intends to petition the prison’s warden and board of directors to have Todwell moved to such a facility.

The second story involves a soldier who lost both legs in the attack on Pearl Harbor. Angry and depressed, he is refusing to consider using artificial limbs. Gillespie assigns him to Chinese-American doctor Lee Wong Howe, introduced in the previous film in the series “Dr. Gillespie's New Assistant” (1942), and Howe works with the soldier to make him see that his life can still have purpose and meaning despite his injury.

The third story involves a group of young girls in the children’s post-surgical ward who have developed a dangerous and highly contagious infection. Gillespie, Howe and Dr. Randall "Red" Adams (also introduced in Dr. Gillespie's New Assistant) work together to try and save the girls.

== Cast ==
- Lionel Barrymore as Dr. Leonard B. Gillespie
- Van Johnson as Dr. Randall 'Red' Adams
- Keye Luke as Dr. Lee Wong How
- Alma Kruger as Molly Byrd
- John Craven as Roy Todwell
- Nat Pendleton as Joe Wayman
- Margaret O'Brien as Margaret
- Donna Reed as Marcia Bradburn
- Michael Duane as Sgt. Patrick J. Orisin
- William Lundigan as Alvin F. Peterson
- Walter Kingsford as Dr. Walter Carew
- Marilyn Maxwell as Ruth Edly
- Henry O'Neill as Warden Kenneson
- Marie Blake as Sally
- Frances Rafferty as Irene

== Reception ==
According to MGM records the movie earned $510,000 in the US and Canada and $272,000 elsewhere resulting in a profit of $179,000.
