= Nell Craig =

American actress (1891–1965)

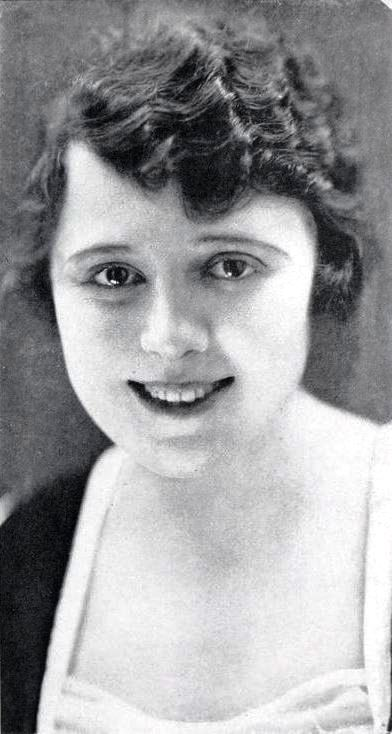
- Craig in 1916
- Born: June 13, 1891; Princeton, New Jersey, U.S.
- Died: January 5, 1965 (aged 73); Hollywood, California, U.S.
- Occupation: Actress
- Years active: 1913–1948

Nell Craig (June 13, 1891 – January 5, 1965) was an American actress from the 1910s into the 1940s. In silent pictures she was known for her collaborations with her husband, director Fred E. Wright. In the 1940s, she played Nurse "Nosey" Parker in the Dr. Kildare and Dr. Gillespie medical dramas.

== Biography ==
Craig was born in Princeton, New Jersey and raised in Philadelphia, the daughter of Charles Craig and Sarah J. Applegate Craig. Her father worked for the railroad; both of her parents were also born in New Jersey.

Craig made over 150 films. Unlike some of her peers, she successfully made the transition from the silent era into sound films. She was seen in westerns, historical romances, melodramas, and comedies. "I prefer emotional parts, not simpering ingenue parts," she told an interviewer in 1917. She was considered a screen beauty, with dark hair and eyes. After playing a blind character in In the Palace of the King (1916), she "suffered severely from inflamed eye balls" after holding her eyes wide open without blinking during filming. Later in her career she played "Nurse Nosey Parker" in the Dr. Kildare and Dr. Gillespie movies.

She married writer and director Fred E. Wright, who directed her in silent films for Pathé and Essanay studios. They moved to California in 1918, he left film work, and she supported them while he wrote his best-selling novel, Pandora La Croix (1924). Her husband died in 1936. She lived at the Motion Picture Country House and Hospital in her later years, and died in 1965, in Hollywood, at the age of 73.

== Partial filmography ==
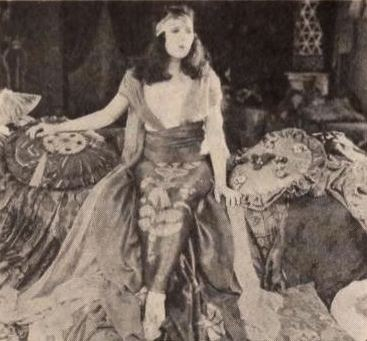
Still from the American drama film The Queen of Sheba (1921) with Nell Craig as Princess Vashti, on page 71 of the September 24, 1921 Exhibitors Herald.

=== Silent films ===
- The Battle of Shiloh (1913)
- Pearl of the Punjab (1914, Pathé)
- When Rome Ruled (1914, Pathé)
- Once a Thief (1914, Essanay)
- Jabez's Conquest (1915, Essanay)
- A Pound for a Pound (1915, Essanay)
- His Crucible (1915, Essanay)
- The Law's Decree (1915, Essanay)
- The Return of Gentleman Joe (1915, Essanay)
- The Second Son (1915, Essanay)
- The Destroyer (1915, Essanay)
- The Whirlpool (1915, Essanay)
- On the Little Mill Trace (1915, Essanay)
- The Danger of Being Lonesome (1915, Essanay)
- The Condemnation (1916, Essanay)
- Gold Dust (1916, Essanay)
- Her Naked Soul (1916, Essanay)
- The War Bride of Plumville (1916, Essanay)
- The Breaker (1916, Essanay) based on a story by Arthur Stringer
- In the Palace of the King (1916, Essanay; adapted from a Francis Marion Crawford novel)
- The Trufflers (1917)
- The Triflers (1920)
- The Desperate Hero (1920)
- Passion's Playground (1920)
- Her First Elopement (1920)
- The Queen of Sheba (1921)
- Remembrance (1922)
- The Abysmal Brute (1923)
- Abraham Lincoln (1924)
- A Boy of Flanders (1924)

=== Sound pictures ===
- Cimarron (1931)
- Hold Your Man (1933)
- Beauty for Sale (1933)
- I'm No Angel (1933)
- The Cat's-Paw (1934)
- The Lemon Drop Kid (1934)
- Mad Love (1935)
- The Secret of Dr. Kildare (1939)
- Dr. Kildare's Strange Case (1940)
- Beyond Tomorrow (1940)
- Dr. Kildare Goes Home (1940)
- Nobody's Children (1940)
- Dr. Kildare's Crisis (1940)
- This Woman is Mine (1941)
- The People vs. Dr. Kildare (1941)
- Dr. Kildare's Wedding Day (1941)
- Dr. Kildare's Victory (1942)
- Calling Dr. Gillespie (1942)
- Dr. Gillespie's New Assistant (1942)
- Henry Aldrich Gets Glamour (1943)
- Dr. Gillespie's Criminal Case (1943)
- Henry Aldrich Plays Cupid (1944)
- 3 Men in White (1944)
- Casanova Brown (1944)
- Fashion Model (1945)
- Between Two Women (1945)
- Black Market Babies (1945)
- Possessed (1947)
- Dark Delusion (1947)
- Here Comes Trouble (1948)
