= Dr. Kildare's Crisis =

1940 film by Harold S. Bucquet

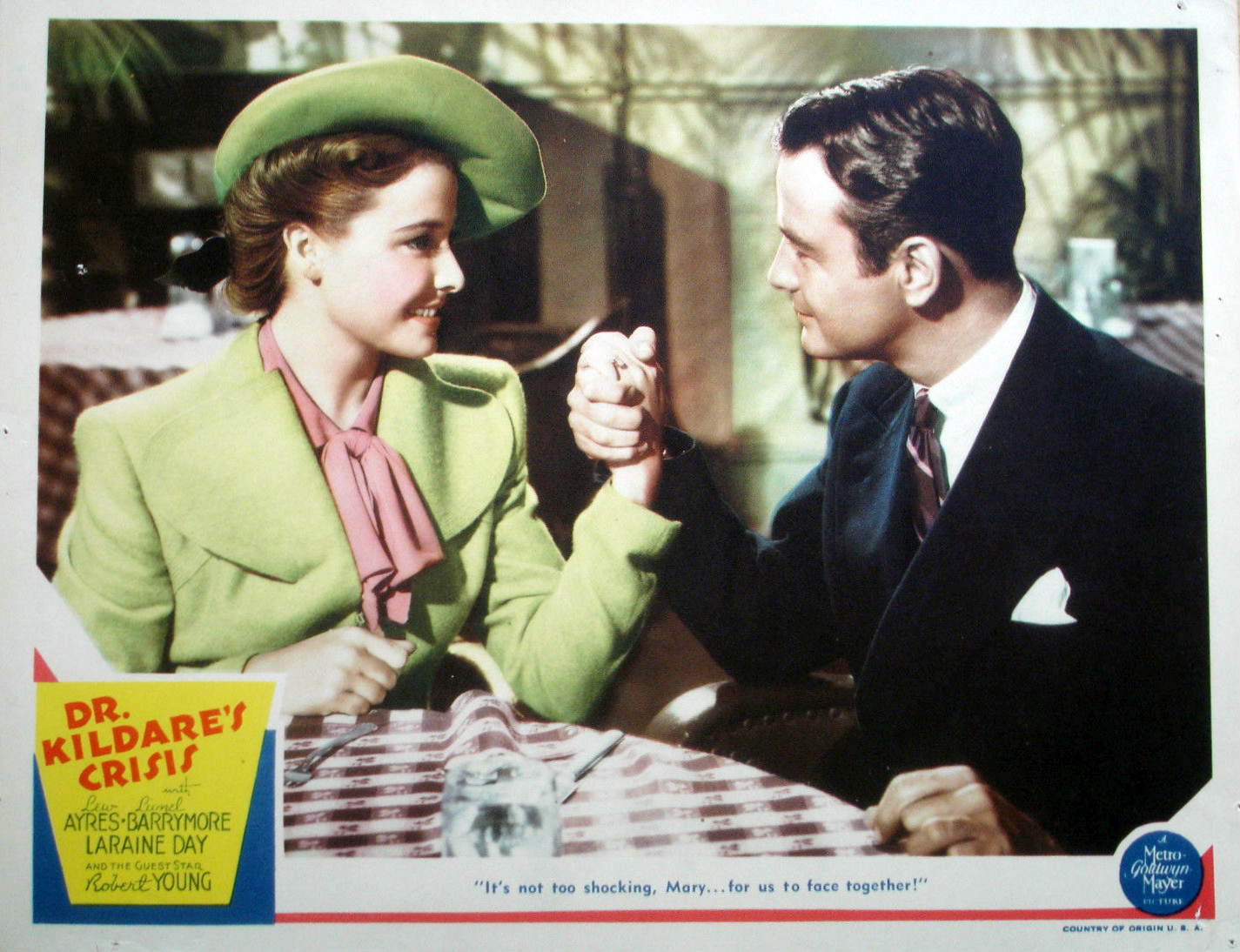
- Lobby card
- Directed by: Harold S. Bucquet
- Written by: Max Brand; Willis Goldbeck
- Screenplay by: Harry Ruskin; Willis Goldbeck
- Starring: Lew Ayres; Lionel Barrymore; Laraine Day
- Cinematography: John F. Seitz
- Edited by: Gene Ruggiero
- Music by: David Snell
- Production company: Metro-Goldwyn-Mayer
- Distributed by: Loew's Inc.
- Release date: November 29, 1940
- Running time: 75 minutes
- Country: United States
- Language: English

Dr. Kildare's Crisis is a 1940 American drama film directed by Harold S. Bucquet, starring Lew Ayres, Lionel Barrymore and Laraine Day. Mary Lamont's (Laraine Day) financier brother Douglas Lamont (Robert Young) is subject to seizures, and it seems that he is suffering from hereditary epilepsy.

It is the sixth in the MGM series of nine films starring Ayres as Dr. Kildare, made from 1938 - 1942.

== Plot ==
As young doctor James Kildare and his fiancée, nurse Mary Lamont, make plans for their wedding day, Mary's brother Douglas arrives for a visit. Douglas asks Kildare to arrange a meeting with wealthy Mr. Chandler, whose daughter Kildare saved in Young Doctor Kildare, to solicit an endowment of a foundation to create three subsidized trade schools to train unskilled workers. Kildare is reluctant to impose on Chandler for ethical reasons but is concerned that Doug, who hears nonexistent sounds, may be an undiagnosed epileptic. His apparent interest in Doug only as an "interesting patient" causes a row with Mary that leads him to change his mind.

Soon after, the happy couple's optimism evaporates into despair when Douglas begins experience mysterious mood swings, further pointing to a form of epilepsy, a condition that threatens his marriage to Mary. Kildare arranges for Doug to meet Chandler but refuses to confide in Mary his unconfirmed suspicions. After Dr. Leonard Gillespie, Kildare's crusty mentor, also demurs, Mary reveals her fears that they are hiding from her some hereditary condition she may also have to nurse superintendent Molly Byrd, who reassures Mary and pleads with her to patiently trust them.

Kildare visits Doug with news that Chandler's partners will meet with Doug the next day, which convinces a moody Doug to agree to a diagnostic experiment, in which Dr. Kildare administers coffee, whiskey, steak and salt to Doug and lies to him in order to shock his nervous system. Doug's rapid recovery from his depressed condition suggests that Kildare's assumption is correct. Kildare sadly concurs that treatment means at best a lifetime of mediocrity but without treatment, a complete disintegration of the brain and death.

Doug reveals the situation to Mary. As a result, she and Doug decide to run away, but their flight is interrupted by Kildare, who convinces them to talk again with Gillespie. Gillespie's shrewd questioning of Doug elicits that he suffered a recent untreated head injury he had been concealing that might be responsible for the symptoms. When a further examination reveals a head trauma that is remedied by a brain operation, the future again looks bright for Doug, Mary and her young doctor, who learns the truism that doctors cannot treat their loved ones.

== Cast ==
- Lew Ayres as Dr. James Kildare
- Lionel Barrymore as Dr. Leonard Gillespie
- Laraine Day as Mary Lamont
- Robert Young as Douglas Lamont
- Nat Pendleton as Joe Wayman
- Walter Kingsford as Dr. Walter Carew
- Alma Kruger as Molly Byrd
- Bobs Watson as Tommy
- Nell Craig as Nurse "Nosey" Parker
- George H. Reed as Conover
- Frank Orth as Mike Ryan
- Marie Blake as Sally
- Horace MacMahon as Foghorn Murphy

== Film series ==
- Young Dr. Kildare (1938), which introduced Lew Ayres as Dr. Kildare and Lionel Barrymore as Dr. Gillespie
- Calling Dr. Kildare (1939)
- The Secret of Dr. Kildare (1939)
- Dr. Kildare's Strange Case (1940)
- Dr. Kildare Goes Home (1940)
- Dr. Kildare's Crisis (1940)
- The People vs. Dr. Kildare (1941) – the last film made with the collaboration of series creator Frederick Schiller Faust (Max Brand)
- Dr. Kildare's Wedding Day (1941)
- Dr. Kildare's Victory (1942)
