= Alma Kruger =

American actress

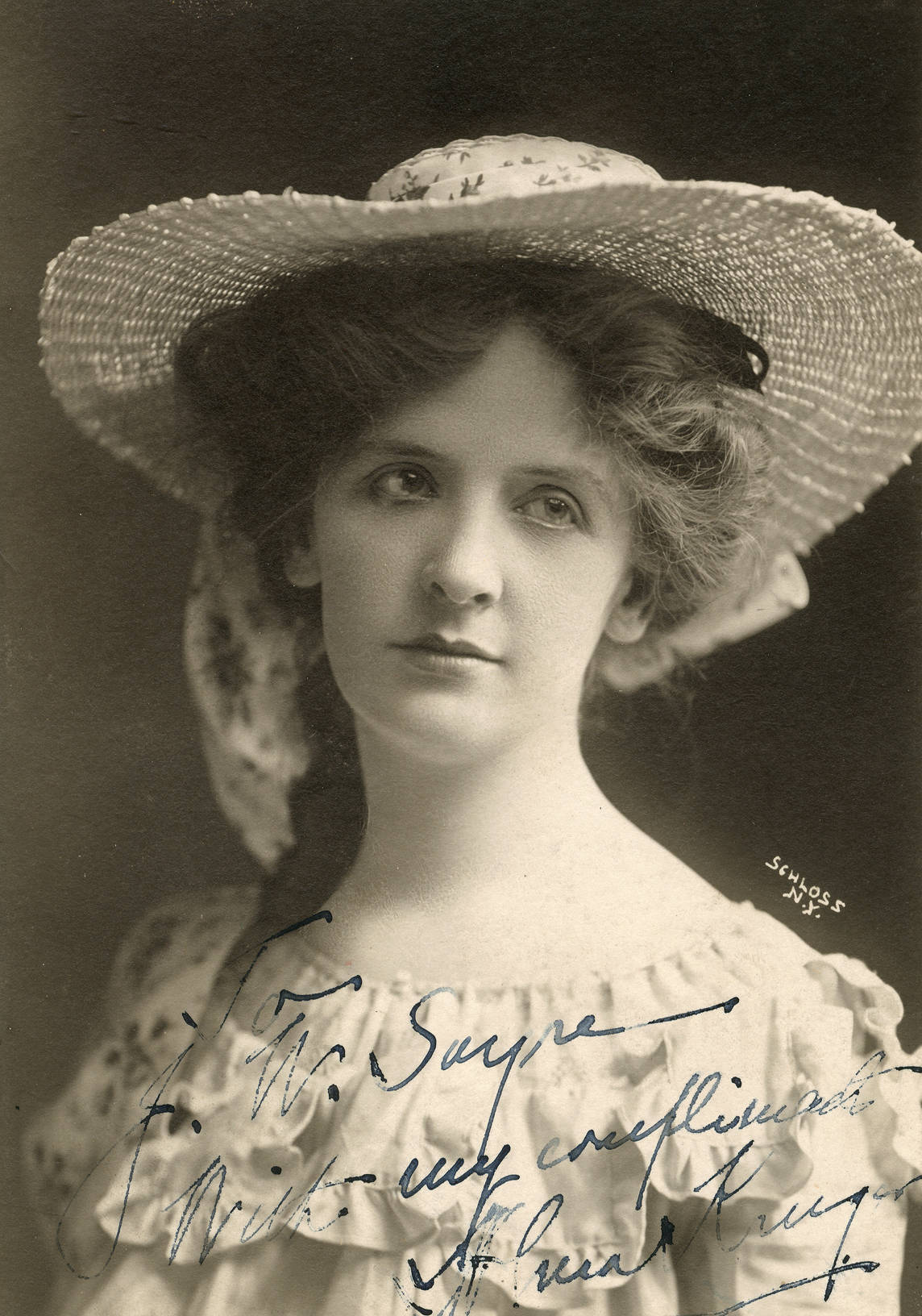
- Kruger in 1903
- Born: September 13, 1871; Pittsburgh, Pennsylvania, U.S.
- Died: April 5, 1960 (aged 88); Seattle, Washington, U.S.
- Occupation: Actress
- Years active: 1907–1947

Alma Kruger (September 13, 1871 – April 5, 1960) was an American actress.

== Early years ==
Kruger was born on September 13, 1871, in Pittsburgh, Pennsylvania, and a member of " a well-to-do Pittsburgh family". Her father was a businessman and an amateur actor. She was educated at Curry University and the American Academy of Dramatic Arts.

== Career ==
Kruger had a long career on stage before appearing in films. From 1907 to 1935, she featured in theatre plays on Broadway, mostly in Shakespearean plays such as Hamlet (as Gertrude), Twelfth Night (as Olivia), Taming of the Shrew (Widow), and The Merchant of Venice (Nerissa).

Kruger was brought to Hollywood by Samuel Goldwyn. She appeared in her first film These Three (1936) while in her 60s. She then proceeded to act in over 40 films in the space of little more than a decade. Among her notable roles was Nurse Molly Byrd, the superintendent of nurses in the popular Dr. Kildare/Dr. Gillespie film series, appearing in all but the first two of the 16 movies.

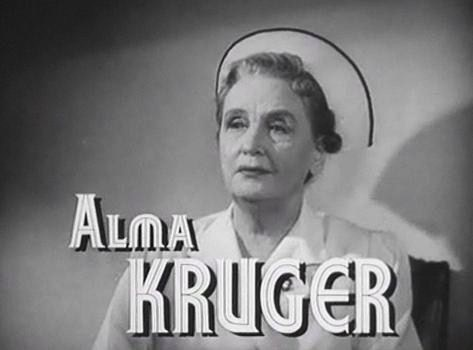
Kruger in the trailer of Dr. Gillespie's New Assistant (1942)

She portrayed Empress Maria Theresa of Austria in Marie Antoinette (1938) and the almost mother-in-law of Rosalind Russell's lead character in His Girl Friday (1940), after already playing an in-law to Russell's character four years earlier in Craig's Wife. In 1942, she appeared as the subversive society matron Henrietta Sutton in Alfred Hitchcock's Saboteur (1942). Kruger's last film appearance was in the film Forever Amber (1947).

On radio, Kruger played Emily Mayfield on Those We Love and the captain's wife on Show Boat.

Kruger's Broadway debut came in John the Baptist (1907).

== Death ==
Kruger died of natural causes on April 5, 1960 in a nursing home in Seattle, Washington. She is believed to have been 88 years old.

== Filmography ==
- These Three (1936) – Mrs. Amelia Tilford
- Craig's Wife (1936) – Ellen Austen
- Love Letters of a Star (1936) – Veronica Todd
- The Mighty Treve (1937) – Mrs. Davis
- Breezing Home (1937) – Mrs. Evans
- The Man in Blue (1937) – Mrs. Dunne
- Vogues of 1938 (1937) – Sophie Miller
- One Hundred Men and a Girl (1937) – Mrs. Tyler
- The Toy Wife (1938) – Madame Vallaire
- Marie Antoinette (1938) – Empress Maria Theresa
- Mother Carey's Chickens (1938) – Aunt Bertha
- Tarnished Angel (1938) – Mrs. Harry Stockton
- The Great Waltz (1938) – Mrs. Strauss
- Made for Each Other (1939) – Sister Madeline
- Calling Dr. Kildare (1939) – Molly Byrd
- The Secret of Dr. Kildare (1939) – Head Nurse Molly Byrd
- Balalaika (1939) – Mrs. Danchenoff
- His Girl Friday (1940) – Mrs. Baldwin
- Dr. Kildare's Strange Case (1940) – Molly Byrd, Superintendent of Nurses
- Anne of Windy Poplars (1940) – Mrs. Stephen Pringle
- Dr. Kildare Goes Home (1940) – Molly Byrd
- You'll Find Out (1940) – Aunt Margo
- Dr. Kildare's Crisis (1940) – Molly Byrd
- Blonde Inspiration (1941) – Victoria
- The Trial of Mary Dugan (1941) – Dr. Saunders
- The People vs. Dr. Kildare (1941) – Molly Byrd
- Puddin' Head (1941) – Molly Byrd
- Dr. Kildare's Wedding Day (1941) – Molly Byrd
- Dr. Kildare's Victory (1942) – Molly Byrd
- Saboteur (1942) – Mrs. Sutton
- Calling Dr. Gillespie (1942) – Molly Byrd
- Dr. Gillespie's New Assistant (1942) – Molly Byrd
- That Other Woman (1942) – Grandma Borden
- Dr. Gillespie's Criminal Case (1943) – Molly Byrd
- Three Men in White (1944) – Molly Byrd
- Our Hearts Were Young and Gay (1944) – Mrs. Lamberton
- Babes on Swing Street (1944) – Martha Curtis
- Mrs. Parkington (1944) – Mrs. Jacob Livingstone (uncredited)
- Between Two Women (1945) – Nurse Molly Byrd
- Crime Doctor's Warning (1945) – Mrs. Wellington Lake (uncredited)
- Colonel Effingham's Raid (1946) – Mrs. Clyde Manadue (uncredited)
- Do You Love Me (1946) – Mrs. Joshua Frederick Crackleton (uncredited)
- A Scandal in Paris (1946) – Marquise De Pierremont
- Fun on a Weekend (1947) – Mrs. Van Orsdale
- Dark Delusion (1947) – Molly Byrd
- Forever Amber (1947) – Lady Redmond (final film role)
