= Calling Dr. Gillespie =

1942 film by Harold S. Bucquet

- Theatrical film poster
- Directed by: Harold S. Bucquet
- Written by: Max Brand; Willis Goldbeck; Kubec Glasmon; Lawrence P. Bachmann
- Screenplay by: Willis Goldbeck; Harry Ruskin
- Starring: Lionel Barrymore; Philip Dorn; Donna Reed
- Cinematography: Ray June
- Edited by: Elmo Veron
- Music by: Daniele Amfitheatrof
- Production company: Metro-Goldwyn-Mayer
- Distributed by: Loew's Inc.
- Release date: July 9, 1942
- Running time: 84 minutes
- Country: United States
- Language: English
- Budget: $416,000
- Box office: $642,000

Calling Dr. Gillespie is a 1942 drama film directed by Harold S. Bucquet, starring Lionel Barrymore, Donna Reed and Philip Dorn. This was a continuation of the series that had starred Lew Ayres as Dr. Kildare. Ayres, however, had declared conscientious objector status to World War II, and was taken off the film. Kildare's mentor, Dr. Gillespie, portrayed here and in earlier films by Barrymore, became the lead character. In this first Kildare-less entry, Gillespie has a new assistant, refugee Dutch surgeon Dr. John Hunter Gerniede (Philip Dorn).

== Plot ==
Finishing school student Marcia Bradburn has good news for her boyfriend, Roy Todwell. Her father has given his permission for their engagement. However, when she refuses to elope with him immediately, Roy inexplicably picks up a flagstone and kills his dog with it, then drives off.

Emma Hope, the head of the school, calls her old friend, Dr. Gillespie. He invites Dr. Gerniede, a surgeon who has repeatedly requested to become a psychoanalyst, to examine Roy (without the latter's knowledge). Roy retains no memory of having killed his pet. Gerniede diagnoses dementia praecox. He and Gillespie strongly recommend treatment in a mental institution, but Roy's parents put their faith in family physician Dr. Kenwood, who insists their son is suffering from overwork at college and just needs some rest. Kenwood stands by his diagnosis, even after Roy suddenly goes berserk for no discernible reason and destroys a store toy display while out with Marcia. He does take the precaution of locking Roy in his bedroom for the night.

Roy escapes out the window and, believing Gillespie to be his enemy, sends him threatening postcards during his travels. In one city, Roy buys a car. Upon its delivery, he murders the salesman and his assistant.

When Marcia spots Roy on the school grounds, Gillespie is put under police protection, but the hospital where he works is far too large and busy for it to be effective. Roy slips in undetected, kills Dr. Kenwood's assistant and masquerades as him. A tense game of cat and mouse ensues. When Roy contacts Marcia, she is able to persuade him to give himself up. Roy, seemingly in one of his sane interludes, is brought to Dr. Gillespie's office. There, however, he pulls out a gun he had found in Gillespie's desk and states that he has to kill the doctor to become cured. Fortunately, Gerniede manages to signal hospital attendant Joe Wayman in the next room. Joe comes up from behind undetected and knocks the gun from Roy's hand by throwing a wrench.

Roy is sentenced to the penitentiary. When Gillespie visits Marcia, he finds she has a new beau, a soldier.

== Cast ==
- Lionel Barrymore as Dr. Leonard Gillespie
- Philip Dorn as Dr. John Hunter Gerniede
- Donna Reed as Marcia Bradburn
- Phil Brown as Roy Todwell
- Nat Pendleton as Joe Wayman
- Alma Kruger as Molly Byrd
- Mary Nash as Emma Hope
- Walter Kingsford as Dr. Walter Carew
- Nell Craig as Nurse "Nosey" Parker
- Ruth Tobey as Susan May "Susie" Prentiss, Marcia's roommate
- Jonathan Hale as Frank Marshall Todwell
- Charles Dingle as Dr. Ward O. Kenwood
- Marie Blake as Sally, receptionist
- Nana Bryant as Mrs. Marshall Todwell
- Eddie Acuff as Clifford Genet
- Ava Gardner as Graduating Student at Miss Hope's (uncredited)
- Charles R. Moore as Porter (uncredited)
- Ray Teal as Policeman (uncredited)

== Reception ==
According to MGM records the film earned $419,000 in the US and Canada and $223,000 elsewhere making the studio a profit of $5,000.
