= We Who Are Young =

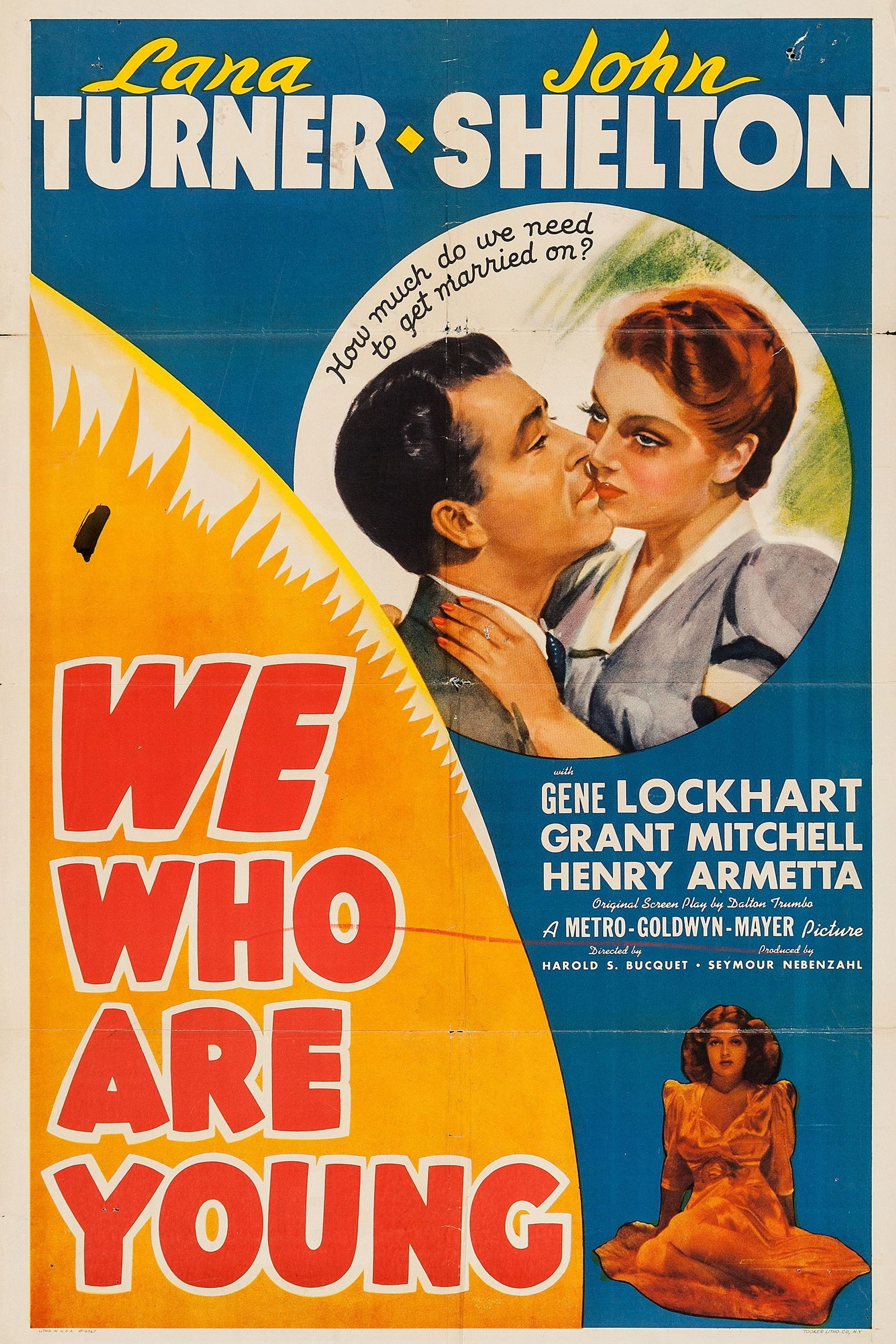
- Theatrical release poster
- Directed by: Harold S. Bucquet
- Screenplay by: Dalton Trumbo
- Produced by: Seymour Nebenzal
- Starring: Lana Turner; John Shelton; Gene Lockhart; Grant Mitchell; Henry Armetta
- Cinematography: Karl Freund; John F. Seitz (uncredited)
- Edited by: Howard O'Neill
- Music by: Bronislau Kaper; Daniele Amfitheatrof (uncredited)
- Production company: Metro-Goldwyn-Mayer
- Distributed by: Loew's Inc.
- Release date: July 12, 1940 (San Francisco)
- Running time: 80 minutes
- Country: United States
- Language: English
- Budget: $362,000
- Box office: $433,000

We Who Are Young is a 1940 American drama film directed by Harold S. Bucquet, written by Dalton Trumbo and starring Lana Turner, John Shelton and Gene Lockhart. It follows two young office workers in New York City who marry against the policy of their company. The film marked Turner's first major starring role.

== Plot ==
Co-workers Bill and Margie fall in love and marry against company policy. They furnish their new apartment on an easy payment plan and Bill is working on a reorganization plan for his boss Mr. Beamis who he hopes will give him a large raise after he accepts the plan. In the office, another co-worker flirts with Margie and Bill blurts out that he and Margie are married. Beamis fires Margie due to company policy and when Bill submits his reorg plan Beamis barely looks at it. When he does he tells Bill it's not what he wants, but does give him a $14 a month raise. Margie discovers she is expecting a baby.

Despite the raise, the newlyweds are having financial difficulties and Bill is fired for salary attachment (wage garnishment). Bill passes his CPA exam and begins looking for work as an accountant, but has no luck. Unable to find work, they have to go on relief. Desperate to do anything, Bill goes onto a construction site and asks for a job. When he's turned down, he sees men shoveling dirt and he grabs a shovel and joins them. He ends up being arrested for trespassing and destruction of private property. When the foreman meets with the building site owners, he is moved by Bill's story and goes to the jail. He offers Bill a job.

Bill goes to Mr. Beamis to get a copy of his reorganization plan and also to tell Beamis exactly what he thinks of him and the way he treats people. After Bill leaves, Mr. Beamis calls his secretary in and asks her why a former employee (who had left two weeks before) had left for another job paying $2 less a week. The secretary fidgets and shyly replies she doesn't know, and when Beamis persists, the secretary keeps insisting that she doesn't know. Mr. Beamis looks away slowly and sadly as the secretary walks out.

Margie is having their baby and Bill rushes home, but cannot get an ambulance to come. He steals a car, but the police escort them to the hospital. Mr. Beamis has a change of heart and offers Bill a new job. Bill has a decision to make.

== Cast ==
- Lana Turner as Margy Brooks
- John Shelton as William Brooks
- Gene Lockhart as C. B. Beamis
- Grant Mitchell as Jones
- Henry Armetta as Tony
- Jonathan Hale as Braddock
- Clarence Wilson as R. Glassford
- Ian Wolfe as Judge
- Hal K. Dawson as Salesman
- John Butler as Mr. Peabody
- Irene Seidner as Mrs. Weinstock
- Charles Lane as Perkins
- Horace McMahon as Foreman

== Production ==
Cinematographer Karl Freund became ill while shooting the film, resulting in John F. Seitz taking over for the remainder of the production.

== Release ==
Metro-Goldwyn-Mayer released We Who Are Young in San Francisco on July 12, 1940. Its release expanded the following week, on July 19, 1940. Sporting Blood was sometimes screened as the film's supporting feature.

== Reception ==
=== Box office ===
According to MGM records, the film earned $297,000 in the U.S. and Canada and $136,000 elsewhere, resulting in a loss of $103,000.

=== Critical response ===
Claude A. La Belle of The San Francisco News wrote that Turner "often manages to be convincing" in her performance. Ada Hanifin of the San Francisco Examiner praised the "humanness and truth" present in the film's story, as well as lauding the talent of Turner and director Harold S. Bucquet's "interesting directorial touch."

== Sources ==
- Schmitt, Gavin (2022). Karl Freund: The Life and Films. Jefferson, North Carolina: McFarland & Company. ISBN 978-1-476-67889-4.
