= Sky Murder =

- Theatrical release poster
- Directed by: George B. Seitz
- Written by: William R. Lipman
- Based on: Nick Carter (literary character)
- Produced by: Frederick Stephani
- Starring: Walter Pidgeon; Donald Meek
- Cinematography: Charles Lawton Jr.
- Edited by: Gene Ruggiero
- Music by: David Snell
- Production company: Metro-Goldwyn-Mayer
- Distributed by: Loew's Inc.
- Release date: September 27, 1940 (US)
- Running time: 72 minutes
- Country: United States
- Language: English
- Budget: $212,000
- Box office: $437,000

Sky Murder is a 1940 detective film starring Walter Pidgeon as detective Nick Carter in his third and final outing for MGM as Nick Carter. The film was part of a trilogy based on original screen stories starring the popular literary series character. In the heightened tensions prior to World War II, Hollywood produced many films in the spy film genre such as Sky Murder.

Sky Murder followed Phantom Raiders (1940) and the first film in the series, Nick Carter, Master Detective (1939) and led to Sky Murder, the last of the Nick Carter series. (Note: After appearing on Broadway, Walter Pidgeon returned to Hollywood, but was relegated to playing secondary roles in films like Saratoga (1937) and The Girl of the Golden West (1938). Taking a leading man role in the Nick Carter series was an opportunity to build his profile with MGM.)

== Plot ==
Old friend Cortland Grand summons private detective Nick Carter and his friend "Beeswax" Bartholomew to Washington for as meeting with Senator Monrose, who heads a committee investigating subversive groups in the U.S. Nick turns down the Senator's request to assist his committee, and flies back to New York on Cortland's personal aircraft. Joining Nick on the flight are six beautiful models accompanied by their chaperone, detective Christine Cross, and Andrew Hendon, a polo star suspected of being a spy.

Upon landing, Hendon is discovered murdered, with a nail file belonging to model Pat Evens in his throat. More ominously, three spies waiting on the landing strip are intent on silencing Pat and, getting into the cockpit, they strangle the pilot. Nick take over, bringing the passengers to Cortland's country house, where he interrogates Pat when machine gun fire hits the house. Bartholomew is dressed in Pat's robes to fool the killers, allowing Nick and Pat to make a getaway.

After leaving in the sheriff's car, Nick and Pat are arrested. When they are locked up, the spies plant a bomb with Pat and Nick again narrowly missing being killed. They take refuge in Cortland's New York apartment where Pat tells Nick that the spies had been threatening to kill her father, held captive in Europe. As Pat confesses, Bartholomew and Christine trace the spies to their hideout behind a printer's shop, but they are taken prisoner.

Sending Pat to stay in a small hotel, Nick contacts Senator Monrose and realizes that Cortland is likely the leader of the fifth column spies. Nick locates Bartholomew by following his bees but when he goes to rescue his assistant, Kathe, one of Cortland's spies, kidnaps Pat.

After rescuing Bartholomew and Christine, Nick alerts the police, who arrest the spies and free Pat. Setting a trap for Cortland, Nick and the Senator board his aircraft, and after Nick tricks him into a confession, Cortland dies in a shootout.

== Cast ==
- Walter Pidgeon as Nick Carter
- Donald Meek as Bartholomew
- Kaaren Verne as Pat Evans (as Karen Verne)
- Edward Ashley as Cortland Grand
- Joyce Compton as Christine Cross / Her Twin Sister
- Tom Conway as Andrew Hendon
- George Lessey as Senator Monrose
- Dorothy Tree as Kathe
- Perc Launders as Henchman
- Warren McCollum as Boy
- Frank Reicher as Dr. Crattan
- Chill Wills as Sheriff Beckwith
- George Watts as Judge Whitmore
- Byron Foulger as Kuse
- William Tannen as Gus
- Milton Parsons as Brock
- Tom Neal as Steve
- Lucien Prival as Brucker
- Virginia O'Brien as Lucille LaVonne
- Judith Allen as 'Ruffles' Macklin
- Kay Sutton as Texas O'Keefe
- Barbara Bedford as Grand's Maid
- Leonard Carey as Sutter, Grand's Butler
- Cy Kendall as Harrigan, House Detective

== Production ==
Production on Sky Murder began on July 24, 1940. A Douglas DC-2 in scale model form is seen in the film.

== Reception ==
=== Box office ===
According to MGM record, Sky Murder earned $270,000 in the US and Canada and $167,000 elsewhere, making a profit of $64,000.

=== Reviews ===
Film reviewer Bosley Crowther, in his The New York Times review of Sky Murder, wrote: "Let a Hollywood producer launch a film series and very shortly the stories, as they appear, become as formalized as Chinese checkers. The Nick Carter mysteries are no exception ... Through it all Nick is magnificently careless. Though sudden death lurks outside the window pane, he never pulls a shade. When seconds count, he saves one to pinch a cutie's cheek. When lesser men quail, he lights a cigarette. As usual, he wins his game in a welter of comic-strip heroics. But, as we were suggesting, it's a little like playing checkers with an opponent whose tricks became familiar long ago".

Film historian and reviewer Leonard Maltin called Sky Murder an "above-average private-eye yarn".

Film historian John Douglas Eames in The MGM Story: The Complete History Of Fifty Roaring Years (1975) described Pigeon's recurring role as sleuth Nick Carter in Sky Murder, "a 'melo'".
