= Harry Ruskin =

American screenwriter and lyricist (1894–1969)

- Born: November 30, 1894; Cincinnati, Ohio, United States
- Died: November 16, 1969 (aged 74); Burbank, California, United States
- Occupations: Screenwriter, lyricist
- Years active: 1930–1958 (film)

Harry Ruskin (November 30, 1894 – November 16, 1969) was an American screenwriter and lyricist. He worked for a variety of Hollywood studios over the course of several decades. For MGM he co-wrote several entries in the Andy Hardy and Dr. Kildare series.

He wrote the lyrics for the 1929 hit song "I May Be Wrong (but I Think You're Wonderful)", with music by Henry Sullivan, used in the musical revue Murray Andersons Almanac.

In a 2020 interview, former Golden Age of Hollywood child actress Cora Sue Collins alleged that when she was 15 years old, Ruskin, then 48 years old, tried to force her to have sex with him in exchange for a good movie role. She refused and told studio boss Louis B. Mayer about what had happened, who was nonchalant and dismissive about it.

== Selected filmography ==
- King of Jazz (1930)
- Smoke Lightning (1933)
- Too Much Harmony (1933)
- Six of a Kind (1934)
- Two for Tonight (1935)
- The Glass Key (1935)
- Lady Be Careful (1936)
- Great Guy (1936)
- The Big Noise (1936)
- Bad Guy (1937)
- The Hit Parade (1937)
- Beg, Borrow or Steal (1937)
- The Women Men Marry (1937)
- Married Before Breakfast (1937)
- Young Dr. Kildare (1938)
- Paradise for Three (1938)
- Love Is a Headache (1938)
- Honolulu (1939)
- Miracles for Sale (1939)
- The Secret of Dr. Kildare (1939)
- Calling Dr. Kildare (1939)
- Dr. Kildare's Strange Case (1940)
- Keeping Company (1940)
- Dr. Kildare Goes Home (1940)
- Dr. Kildare's Crisis (1940)
- The Ghost Comes Home (1940)
- Dr. Kildare's Wedding Day (1941)
- Andy Hardy's Private Secretary (1941)
- The People vs. Dr. Kildare (1941)
- The Penalty (1941)
- Dr. Kildare's Victory (1942)
- This Time for Keeps (1942)
- Tish (1942)
- Calling Dr. Gillespie (1942)
- Dr. Gillespie's New Assistant (1942)
- Dr. Gillespie's Criminal Case (1943)
- Rationing (1944)
- Andy Hardy's Blonde Trouble (1944)
- Lost in a Harem (1944)
- Barbary Coast Gent (1944)
- Three Men in White (1944)
- The Hidden Eye (1945)
- Between Two Women (1945)
- Love Laughs at Andy Hardy (1946)
- The Postman Always Rings Twice (1946)
- Dark Delusion (1947)
- Tenth Avenue Angel (1948)
- Julia Misbehaves (1948)
- Watch the Birdie (1950)
- The Happy Years (1950)
- Lady Godiva of Coventry (1955)
- The Girl in the Kremlin (1957)
- Andy Hardy Comes Home (1958)

== Bibliography ==
- Dietz, Dan. The Complete Book of 1920s Broadway Musicals. Rowman & Littlefield, 2019.
- Scott, Ian. In Capra's Shadow: The Life and Career of Screenwriter Robert Riskin. University Press of Kentucky, 2014.
