= Dr. Kildare's Strange Case =

- Directed by: Harold S. Bucquet
- Written by: Max Brand (story) and Willis Goldbeck (story); Harry Ruskin (screenplay) and Willis Goldbeck (screenplay)
- Produced by: Harold S. Bucquet
- Starring: Lew Ayres; Lionel Barrymore; Laraine Day
- Cinematography: John F. Seitz
- Edited by: Gene Ruggiero
- Music by: David Snell
- Distributed by: Metro-Goldwyn-Mayer
- Release date: April 12, 1940
- Running time: 77 minutes
- Country: United States
- Language: English

Dr. Kildare's Strange Case is a 1940 American drama film directed by Harold S. Bucquet. This was the fifth of a total of ten Dr. Kildare pictures. Horace MacMahon joined the cast regulars in the series as taxi driver "Foghorn" Murphy.

== Plot ==
Dr. James Kildare finds competition for the affections of nurse Mary Lamont in the person of wealthy brain surgeon Dr. Gregory Lane. Kildare has not proposed to Mary because of his poor financial situation as an intern. Kildare's mentor, Dr. Leonard Gillespie, is informed that Paul Messenger, whose daughter Kildare cured in The Secret of Dr. Kildare, has arranged for Kildare to be offered a prestigious, lucrative position with the Messenger Institute. In the meantime Kildare has arranged for his inspiring but crusty mentor to see a cancer specialist about the melanoma Gillespie is battling.

Despite the temptation of a high salary and a new home, Kildare turns down the job offer to continue to remain near Gillespie. As a result, Mary gives up all hope of marrying Kildare and is assigned as a staff surgical nurse to Lane. Kildare and Lane are put together on a case involving an unidentified patient with a skull fracture who is refusing the operation that would save his life. Lane knows the patient urgently needs the surgery but has lost confidence in himself because too many of his patients have died on the operating table. Kildare convinces Lane that Gillespie has full confidence in his skills and Lane proceeds with the operation.

When the patient wakes up, he shows clear signs of insanity, putting Lane's career in jeopardy and subject to criminal prosecution. Kildare is convinced that the man was mentally ill before the accident which fractured his skull, and thus Lane had a legal right to perform the operation. He risks his own career by using a new treatment, the "insulin shock cure," which succeeds. Questioning the patient for his identity and background, Kildare finds the man's estranged wife and learns that he had gradually lost his sanity over a five-year separation.

Mary puts her own career on the line to protect Kildare until he returns with the wife. Gillespie fires Kildare to get him to propose to Mary. She accepts, even knowing that their engagement will of necessity be a protracted one. Seeing the couple reunited, Gillespie reveals that once again he has plotted to have Kildare find his own way through a difficult situation. Turning the tables, Kildare extracts a promise from Gillespie to accept the care of the cancer specialist in return for keeping Kildare on as his assistant.

== Cast ==
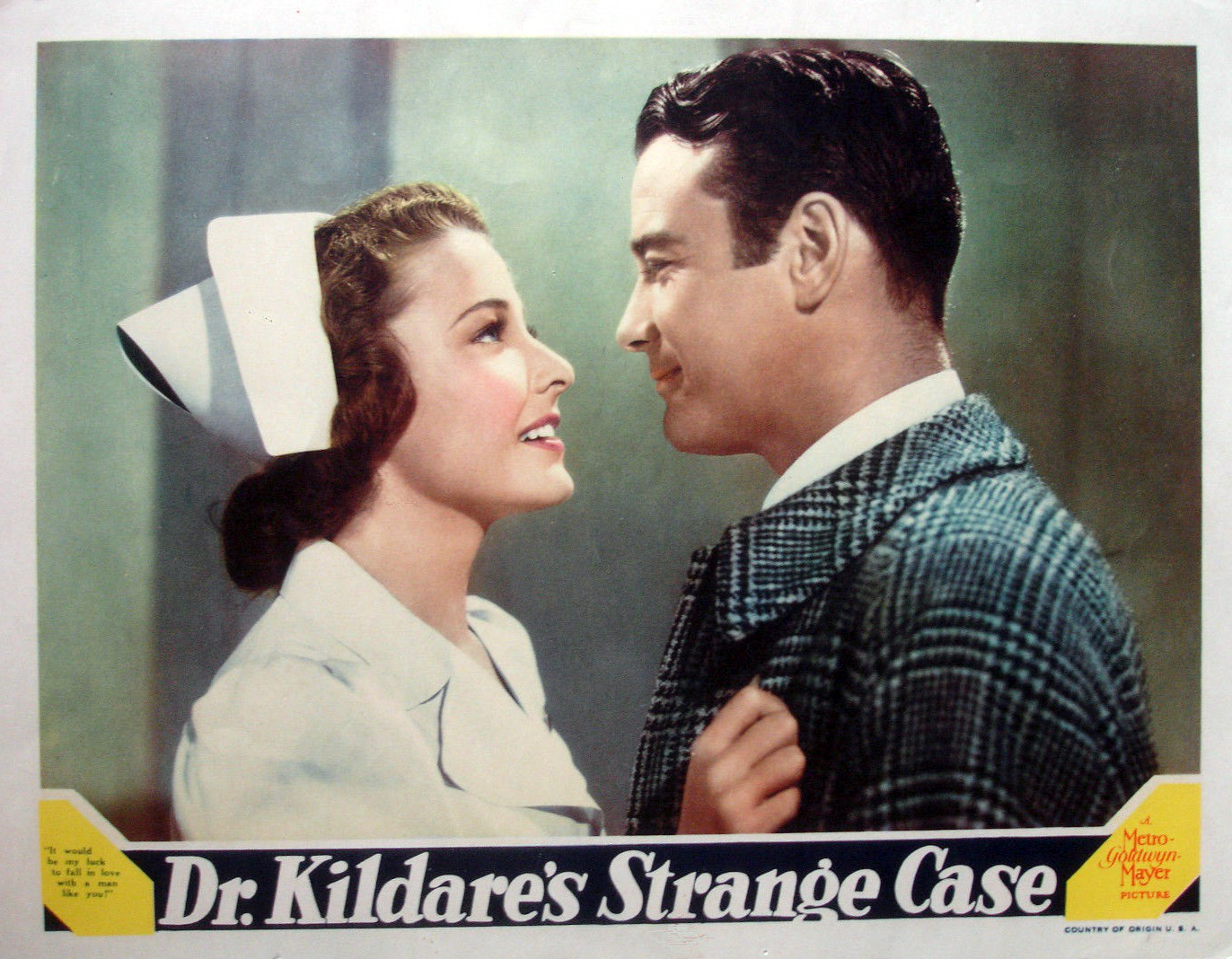
Lobby card for Dr.Kildare's Strange Case (1940)

- Lew Ayres as Dr. James Kildare
- Lionel Barrymore as Dr. Leonard Gillespie
- Laraine Day as Nurse Mary Lamont
- Shepperd Strudwick as Dr. Gregory Lane
- Samuel S. Hinds as Dr. Stephen Kildare
- Emma Dunn as Mrs. Martha Kildare
- Nat Pendleton as Joe Wayman
- Walter Kingsford as Dr. S.J. Carew
- Alma Kruger as Molly Byrd
- John Eldredge as Henry Adams
- Nell Craig as "Nosey" Parker
- Marie Blake as Sally
- Charles Waldron as Dr. Squires
- George Lessey as Rufus Ingersoll
- Tom Collins as Dr. Joiner
- George Reed as Conover
- Paul Porcasi as Tony
- Horace McMahon as J. Harold "Fog Horn" Murphy
- Frank Orth as Mike Ryan
- Margaret Seddon as Mrs. Julia Cray
- Fay Helm as Mrs. Henry Adams
