= I Love You Again =

1940 film by W. S. Van Dyke

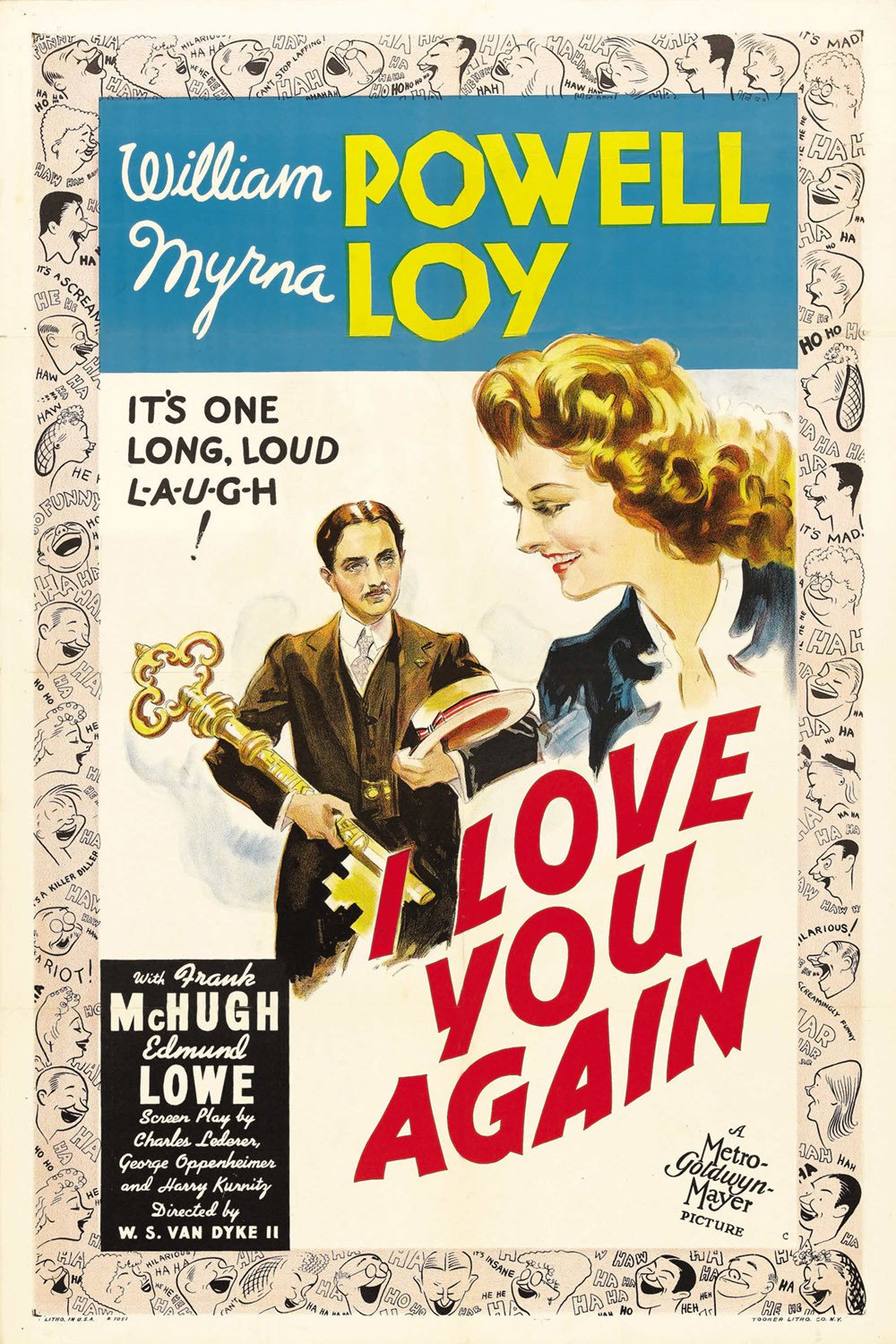
- Theatrical release poster
- Directed by: W. S. Van Dyke
- Screenplay by: Charles Lederer; George Oppenheimer; Harry Kurnitz
- Story by: Leon Gordon; Maurine Watkins
- Based on: I Love You Again; 1937 novel by Octavus Roy Cohen
- Produced by: Lawrence Weingarten
- Starring: William Powell; Myrna Loy; Frank McHugh; Edmund Lowe
- Cinematography: Oliver T. Marsh
- Edited by: Gene Ruggiero
- Music by: Franz Waxman
- Production company: Metro-Goldwyn-Mayer
- Distributed by: Loew's Inc.
- Release date: September 9, 1940
- Running time: 99 minutes
- Country: United States
- Language: English

I Love You Again is a 1940 American screwball comedy film directed by W. S. Van Dyke and starring William Powell and Myrna Loy, all three of whom were prominently involved in the Thin Man film series.

== Plot ==
In 1940, while on a vacation cruise, a drunken "Doc" Ryan falls overboard, and when Larry Wilson throws him a lifebuoy, the rope becomes tangled around his ankle, causing Larry to fall into the sea. As a group of sailors rescue the two men, Larry is accidentally hit on the head with an oar. He awakens in his cabin with Doc by his side and remembers that he is actually George Carey, a suave con man. The last thing he remembers is getting struck on the head in a fight with another crook in 1931.

George realizes that he has suffered from amnesia for the past nine years, living as a stuffy, overly frugal and teetotaling businessman named Larry Wilson. When George and Doc, a fellow con artist, discover that Larry has $147,000 in one of his three accounts, they decide to go to Larry's hometown of Habersville, Pennsylvania, in order to liquidate his bank accounts, with Doc posing as George's physician. When the ship docks in New York, they are met by Larry's wife, Kay. In George's hotel suite, Kay announces her plans to divorce him.

A Habersville National Bank employee informs George that Larry's personal account is now overdrawn due to a plot of land he just purchased, and the other accounts are under the control of the Community Chest and the Anti-Vice League. George and Doc hatch a scheme to plant oil on George's new land and trick wealthy investors into buying the property at high prices. George also plans to stall his divorce in order to avoid any scandal that could harm his reputation and thus jeopardize the scam.

Kay's fiancé, Herbert, bursts into George's suite looking for her. He explains that Kay wants to divorce George because he prioritized his numerous clubs and organizations over his marriage. That night, George invites Kay and Herbert to dinner, saying he will grant her the divorce in five or six weeks. Kay begrudgingly agrees to George's terms, and as she leaves with Herbert, George gives her a farewell kiss.

George, Doc, Kay, and Herbert arrive in Habersville. To the surprise of Kay and the employees of a lingerie store, George, known for his penny-pinching ways, buys Kay an expensive nightgown. That night, George and Doc meet with George's old grifting partner, Duke Sheldon, who has planted the oil on Larry's land. Later, George flirts with Kay, who accuses him of only wooing her because he fears for his reputation. When George responds by cooing like a dove, Kay starts to cry.

The next day, George learns that Larry is the troop leader of the Junior Rangers, a Boy Scout-like organization. Since many of the Rangers are the sons of influential businessmen, George leads the troop to the pond where Duke planted the oil. After three of the boys lead their fathers to the supposed oil well that night, the three men offer George $10,000 for his land, without mentioning the oil. As part of the con, Duke arrives and offers $100,000 for the land, which the other men match.

Later that night, Kay mails a break-up letter to Herbert. She tells George that ever since he returned from the cruise, he has become the type of exciting man she had dreamt of marrying, and she later kisses him. George tells Doc that the oil deal is off as he would rather live an honest life with Kay. While George heads over to Duke's hotel room, Kay overhears Doc talking to Duke on the phone about aborting the con.

At the hotel, Duke threatens to expose George unless he sees the con through. Shortly after Kay and Doc arrive, Duke knocks George unconscious. When George awakens as if he is Larry on the cruise, Kay is devastated. Realizing that a blow to the head seems to switch George's personality, Kay grabs a vase before George coos like a dove, proving that he feigned amnesia to get out of the con. Relieved, Kay kisses George.

== Cast ==
- William Powell as Lawrence "Larry" Wilson / George Carey
- Myrna Loy as Katherine "Kay" Wilson
- Frank McHugh as "Doc" Ryan
- Edmund Lowe as Duke Sheldon
- Donald Douglas as Herbert
- Nella Walker as Kay's mother
- Carl "Alfalfa" Switzer as Leonard Harkspur Jr.
- Pierre Watkin as W. H. Sims
- Paul Stanton as Edward Littlejohn Sr.
- Morgan Wallace as Phil Belenson
- Charles Arnt as Mr. Billings
- Robert Blake as Edward Littlejohn Jr. (uncredited)
- Charles Halton as Leonard Harkspur Sr. (uncredited)

== Reception ==
Reviews of the film were generally positive. New York Times critic Bosley Crowther praised the film writing: "Mr. Powell and Miss Loy, no matter what their names, are one of our most versatile and frisky connubial comedy teams, and, given a script as daffy as the one here in evidence, they can make an hour and a half spin like a roulette wheel." W. S. from Motion Picture Daily stated that the audience was in "continuous laughter and applause throughout the film" and claimed that “M-G-M has made the funniest motion picture this industry has seen in 10 years."

Other critics agreed. Laura Lee, critic for the Philadelphia Bulletin, wrote, "Too ridiculous for words, but I Love You Again is extremely funny. You may feel silly for laughing but laugh you must." Gilbert Kanour of the Baltimore Evening Sun said, "William Powell and Myrna Loy have lost none of their skill in provoking laughter...a witty and inventive plot."

According to Motion Picture Daily, the film did above average business at the box office during its first two weeks.

== Radio adaptations ==
Lux Radio Theatre adapted the film twice, first in 1941 with Loy and Cary Grant, then in 1948 with Powell and Ann Sothern (Loy was supposed to reprise her film role in this adaptation, but had to drop out to do retakes on another film).
