= Blonde Inspiration =

1941 film by Busby Berkeley

- Film poster
- Directed by: Busby Berkeley
- Screenplay by: Marion Parsonnet
- Based on: Four Cents a Word; 1937 play by John Cecil Holm
- Produced by: B.P. Fineman
- Starring: John Shelton; Virginia Grey; Albert Dekker; Charles Butterworth; Donald Meek
- Cinematography: Oliver T. Marsh; Sidney Wagner
- Edited by: Gene Ruggiero
- Music by: Bronislau Kaper
- Production company: Metro-Goldwyn-Mayer
- Distributed by: Loew's Inc.
- Release date: February 7, 1941
- Running time: 72 minutes
- Country: United States
- Language: English

Blonde Inspiration is a 1941 American comedy film directed by Busby Berkeley and written by Marion Parsonnet. The film stars John Shelton, Virginia Grey, Albert Dekker, Charles Butterworth, and Donald Meek. The film was released on February 7, 1941, by Metro-Goldwyn-Mayer.

== Plot ==
Aspiring western writer Jonathan moves to New York to try and sell his work. After numerous closed doors, he falls in with the unscrupulous pulp magazine publisher Hendricks, who's deeply in debt and sees him as a source of free material, especially after regular writer Dusty refuses to work anymore without getting the money he's owed. Hendricks' secretary Margie feels bad for the deception but goes along with it to keep her own job. More catastrophes, both artistic and romantic, ensue before everything works out.

== Cast ==
- John Shelton as Jonathan 'Johnny' Briggs
- Virginia Grey as Margie Blake
- Albert Dekker as Phil Hendricks
- Charles Butterworth as 'Bittsy' Conway
- Donald Meek as 'Dusty' King
- Reginald Owen as Reginald Mason
- Alma Kruger as Victoria Mason
- Rita Quigley as Regina Mason
- Marion Martin as Wanda 'Baby'
- George Lessey as C. V. Hutchins

== Bibliography ==
- Fetrow, Alan G. Feature Films, 1940-1949: a United States Filmography. McFarland, 1994.
