= Three Men in White =

1944 film by Willis Goldbeck

- Directed by: Willis Goldbeck
- Written by: Martin Berkeley; Harry Ruskin
- Produced by: Carey Wilson
- Starring: Lionel Barrymore; Van Johnson; Marilyn Maxwell
- Cinematography: Ray June
- Edited by: George Hively
- Music by: Nathaniel Shilkret
- Production company: Metro-Goldwyn-Mayer
- Distributed by: Loew's Inc.
- Release date: May 26, 1944
- Running time: 85 minutes
- Country: United States
- Language: English
- Budget: $450,000
- Box office: $868,000

Three Men in White is a 1944 American comedy-drama film in the Dr Kildare series directed by Willis Goldbeck. It stars Lionel Barrymore, Van Johnson, and Marilyn Maxwell. Ava Gardner has a supporting role.

== Plot ==
Doctors Ames and How compete to be Gillespie's new assistant. Ames becomes involved with a young female patient found unconscious in her car, presumably from alcohol despite having no trace of it in her system. The young woman's mother becomes a patient due to advanced arthritis that keeps her confined to a wheelchair and in a neck brace, unable to move without pain.

== Cast ==
- Lionel Barrymore as Dr. Leonard B. Gillespie
- Van Johnson as Dr. Randall "Red" Ames
- Marilyn Maxwell as Ruth Edley
- Keye Luke as Dr. Lee Wong How
- Ava Gardner as Jean Brown
- Alma Kruger as Molly Bird
- Rags Ragland as Hobart Genet
- Nell Craig as Nurse "Nosey" Parker

== Box office ==
According to MGM records the film earned $600,000 in the US and Canada and $268,000 elsewhere resulting in a profit of $121,000.

== See also ==
- List of American films of 1944
