= She Went to the Races =

1945 film by Willis Goldbeck

- Theatrical Film Poster
- Directed by: Willis Goldbeck
- Written by: Alan Friedman (story); Lawrence Hazard; Buster Keaton (uncredited); DeVallon Scott (story)
- Produced by: Frederick Stephani
- Starring: James Craig; Frances Gifford; Ava Gardner; Edmund Gwenn
- Cinematography: Charles Salerno Jr.
- Edited by: Adrienne Fazan
- Music by: Nathaniel Shilkret
- Distributed by: Metro-Goldwyn-Mayer
- Release date: November 4, 1945
- Running time: 86 minutes
- Country: United States
- Language: English

She Went to the Races is a 1945 American comedy film directed by Willis Goldbeck and starring James Craig, Frances Gifford and Ava Gardner. The screenplay concerns a team of scientists who discover a seemingly foolproof way of discovering the winner of horse races.

== Plot ==
Dr. Ann Wotters, working at the Brockhurst Institute of Research in Los Angeles, is devastated when she learns that her uncle, Dr. Homer Pecke, will be let go because the institute cannot afford to keep him on staff and his research project running. The institute would need another $20,000 to afford Pecke's services.

Ann and her uncle's colleagues Dr. Gurke, Dr. Pembroke and Dr. Collyer try to come up with a plan to raise the money. They get unexpected help from the institute janitor, who has had recent success at the racetrack. They try to come up with a foolproof formula to foresee which horses will win the races. The four scientists then decide to try their "luck" at the Pasadena racetrack. They discover that there are no available hotel rooms left in the city, but Ann manages to persuade the staff of a hotel to let her into the room reserved for Steve Canfield, who is a race horse owner. When Steve checks in, Ann persuades him to let her keep one of the rooms in his suite.

Hilda, Steve's old girlfriend and horse owning colleague, is also staying at the hotel. She is keen on reuniting with Steve, but Ann and Steve are starting to get romantically involved. Meanwhile, the three other scientists are trying to decide which horse to bet on and eventually decide on Steve's horse, Mr. McGillicudy. When Steve hears about this, he tries to persuade Ann not to bet on his horse, afraid that he will be blamed for her losing money if his horse loses.

Homer goes missing from his home in Los Angeles, then turns up at the racetrack in Pasadena too, and makes contact with Steve's horse trainer Jeff Habbard. Homer tells Ann that he has bet on Steve's horse because Steve himself has bet on it. Ann has followed Steve's advice, however, and bet on another horse, losing their money when Mr. McGillicuddy wins. Ann is furious and suspicious of Steve after this. Steve feels bad, not knowing that Uncle Homer was misinformed about his betting on his own horse. The relationship between Ann and Steve comes to an abrupt end, giving Hilda greater leverage for reconciliation with Steve. Even though Hilda is still in love with "the Count" and Steve with Ann, Hilda proposes they marry and merge their racing interests.

Although Homer wins on Steve's horse, the scientists haven't won enough money to get Homer reinstated at the institute. Ann goes to Steve to borrow the rest of the money from him, but finds him and Hilda drinking and on the floor in Hilda's room. Steve, still unaware that Ann thinks he bet on his own horse, catches Ann off guard by offering her the money before she can ask. Elated at first, Ann storms off without the money when Steve tells her that he is now engaged to Hilda.

At the next race, Ann asks Steve to place another bet for her on Mr. McGillicuddy, then challenges Hilda to withdraw her horse from a joint entry with McGillicudy to prove she is not marrying Steve for the money. The scientists find that they have miscalculated and have placed the wrong bet. Hilda accepts the challenge and they decide to bet on the outcome of the race—the one who picks the winning horse gets to be with Steve. Steve returns, having saved the scientists by betting on the horse he thought would win. Just before the race begins, Ann learns that the institute has found money to reinstate Homer. Mr. McGillicudy wins the race, Ann and the scientists win their bets, and Steve and Ann reunite with a kiss in the winner's circle.

== Cast ==
- James Craig as Steve Canfield
- Frances Gifford as Doctor Wotters
- Ava Gardner as Hilda Spotts
- Edmund Gwenn as Doctor Pecke
- Sig Ruman as Doctor Gurke
- Reginald Owen as Dr. Pembroke
- J.M. Kerrigan as Jeff Habbard
- Charles Halton as Doctor Collyer
- Chester Clute as Wallace Mason
- Frank Orth as Bartender Skelly
- Joe Hernandez as Himself
- Buster Keaton as bellboy (uncredited)
- John Dehner as winner's announcer (uncredited)

== See also ==
- List of films about horses
- List of films about horse racing
