= John Shelton (actor) =

American actor (1915–1972)

- Born: May 18, 1915; Los Angeles, California, US
- Died: May 17, 1972 (aged 56); Colombo, Ceylon
- Occupation: Actor
- Years active: 1936–1952
- Spouses: Sally Sage (m. 1938; div. 1940) Kathryn Grayson (m. 1941; div. 1946) Marti Stanley (m. 1946; div. 1948) Irene Winston (m. 1948; div. 1953) Lorraine Ludwig (m. 1953)
- Children: 4

John Shelton (May 18, 1915 – May 17, 1972) was an American actor.

== Personal life ==
Shelton, also known as John Price, was born in Los Angeles, California. He was the grandson of creationist George McCready Price. He named one of his sons Darwin to "balance everything out".

Shelton was married five times. His first four marriages were childless and ended in divorce, while he and his fifth wife had four children before his death.

He was married to Sally Sage from 1938 to 1940, actress Kathryn Grayson from 1941 to 1946, Marti Stanley from 1946 to 1948, Irene Winston from 1948 to 1953, and Lorraine Ludwig from October 3, 1953, until his death. He and Ludwig had 4 children together. Musician Tom Price is his son and singer Rachael Price is his granddaughter.

== Death ==
He died mysteriously in a prison in Sri Lanka.

== Selected filmography ==
John Shelton has about 40 acting credits, 38 movies and 2 TV series.

Year	Title	Role	Notes
1938	The Gladiator		
1940	Dr. Kildare Goes Home	Dr. Davidson	
1940	We Who Are Young	William Brooks	
1941	Blonde Inspiration	Jonathan "Johnny" Briggs	
1942	A-Haunting We Will Go	Tommy White	
1942	Foreign Agent	Jimmy	
1942	Whispering Ghosts	David Courtland	
1946	The Time of Their Lives	Sheldon Gage	With Abbott & Costello
1947	The Big Fix	Del Cassini	
1947	Road to the Big House	Eddie Clark	
