= Boston Blackie (TV series) =

American syndicated TV detective drama (1950s)

- Genre: Crime
- Written by: Don Mullally; Herb Purdum
- Directed by: Eddie Davis; Paul Landres; Sobey Martin; George M. Cahan
- Starring: Kent Taylor; Lois Collier; Frank Orth
- Composer: Jack Shaindlin
- Country of origin: United States
- Original language: English
- No. of seasons: 2
- No. of episodes: 58

Production
- Running time: 22–26 minutes
- Production company: Ziv

Original release
- Release: September 10, 1951 – May 22, 1953

Boston Blackie is an American syndicated television detective drama that was released in September 1951, with 58 episodes produced through 1953.

== Background ==
The Ziv Company, which syndicated the Boston Blackie radio series, adapted it for television. The basic premise for the series went back to film and magazine stories about Boston Blackie. Frederick Ziv, the company's owner, wanted to make Boston Blackie the company's first syndicated TV series, but popularity of the Hopalong Cassidy TV show led him to produce The Cisco Kid first.

== Overview ==
The central character was Horatio Black, better known as Boston Blackie, a former criminal who had become a detective. His girlfriend, Mary Wesley, helped him to solve crimes before the police could do so. Kent Taylor portrayed Blackie, and Lois Collier (selected over 60 other actresses who sought the part) played Mary. The couple was usually accompanied by a dog, Whitey. Mary was a nurse who was "very independent and gutsy". Frank Orth played Inspector Faraday, a "typical not-so-bright police detective". Episodes included many wisecracks. Actors who often appeared in supporting roles included John Doucette, John Eldredge, Herb Vigran, and Ben Welden. Tom Hanlon appeared midway through each episode to introduce the commercial break.

== Production ==
Ziv filmed 58 full-color 30-minute episodes in space rented from Eagle-Lion Films. The series was set in Los Angeles. Location shots of "exotic settings" were usually filmed near the studio at sites like the amusement pier in Santa Monica and the Japanese Gardens in San Francisco. The overall cost was $21,000 per episode. Production time was shortened by having as many as three episodes filmed at the same time.Episodes were "shot in bits and pieces".

Directors included George M. Cahan, Eddie Davis, and Sobey Martin. Writers included Herb Purdum.

Each episode's opening featured a shadowed alley in which a dark figure walked while an announcer said, "Danger. Excitement. Adventure. Boston Blackie — enemy to those who make him an enemy; friend to those who have no friends."

== Other countries ==
Ziv Company sold Boston Blackie and five more of its programs to Amalgamated Television Services, the commercial TV company in Australia, and it was one of four programs sold to Radio-Audizione Italiana to be broadcast over a seven-station network in Italy.

== Critical response ==
The book The Complete Directory to Prime Time Network and Cable TV Shows 1946–Present called Boston Blackie "a memorable B-grade television series". It said, "... a certain vitality and sense of humor substituted more than adequately for the normal criteria of expensive production and famous stars."

Media critic John Crosby classified Boston Blackie and other Ziv TV productions as "triumphs in cost accounting over art", explaining that Ziv made TV shows "on a mass production basis, which is the only way movie techniques can be made to fit into the relatively small television budgets". He contrasted Boston Blackie ("shot in bits and pieces like any movie") with I Love Lucy, which was filmed with a story line in front of an audience, giving it a feeling of spontaneity.

== 1949 pilot ==
WLWT in Cincinnati broadcast a pilot TV episode of Boston Blackie on August 17, 1949. Bob Middleton had the title role, and Laura Frazer portrayed Mary Wesley. Others who appeared in the program included Bob Benchely, Tom Kane, Allan Lurie, William Querner, and Golda Seiter.
