= Dark Delusion =

1947 film by Willis Goldbeck

- Directed by: Willis Goldbeck
- Written by: Jack Andrews; Harry Ruskin; Max Brand (characters)
- Produced by: Willis Goldbeck; Carey Wilson
- Starring: James Craig; Lionel Barrymore; Lucille Bremer
- Cinematography: Charles Rosher
- Edited by: Gene Ruggiero
- Music by: David Snell
- Production company: Metro-Goldwyn-Mayer
- Distributed by: Metro-Goldwyn-Mayer
- Release date: June 25, 1947
- Running time: 90 minutes
- Country: United States
- Language: English
- Budget: $875,000
- Box office: $718,000

Dark Delusion is a 1947 American drama film directed by Willis Goldbeck and starring James Craig, Lionel Barrymore, and Lucille Bremer. Produced and released by Metro-Goldwyn-Mayer, it was the last film in the Dr. Kildare film series which stretched back to 1937.

== Plot ==
Dr. Gillespie asks a young surgeon, Dr. Tommy Coalt, to go to the small town of Bayhurst to replace a local doctor while he is on assignment to the Occupation effort in post-World War II Europe. There, Coalt is asked to sign mental-health commitment papers on a beautiful young socialite, Cynthia Grace. Coalt thinks there is something amiss, and begins his own investigation.

== Cast ==
- Lionel Barrymore as Dr. Leonard Gillespie
- James Craig as Dr. Tommy Coalt
- Lucille Bremer as Cynthia Grace
- Jayne Meadows as Mrs. Selkirk
- Warner Anderson as Teddy Selkirk
- Henry Stephenson as Dr. Evans Biddle
- Alma Kruger as Molly Byrd
- Keye Luke as Dr. Lee Wong How
- Art Baker as Dr. Sanford Burson
- Lester Matthews as Wyndham Grace
- Marie Blake as Sally
- Ben Lessy as Napoleon
- Geraldine Wall as Mrs. Rowland
- Nell Craig as Nurse 'Nosey' Parker
- George Reed as Conover
- Mary Currier as Nurse Workman

== Reception ==
According to MGM records, the movie was not a hit, earning $475,000 in the US and Canada and $243,000 elsewhere, making a loss to the studio of $448,000.
