= George Boemler =

American film editor (1902–1968)

- Born: March 8, 1902
- Died: June 11, 1968 (aged 66)
- Resting place: Pierce Brothers Westwood Village Memorial Park and Mortuary
- Occupation: Film editor
- Spouse: Grace Boemler

George E. Boemler (March 5, 1902 – June 11, 1968) was an American film editor. He edited many films in the 1930s-1960s like Hollywood Party, The Bride Goes Wild, The Power and the Prize, Run Silent, Run Deep, and Five Weeks in a Balloon. He was nominated for an Emmy Award in 1963 for his work on Ben Casey.
