= Cry Wilderness =

1987 film by Jay Schlossberg-Cohen

- Theatrical release poster
- Directed by: Jay Schlossberg-Cohen
- Written by: Jay Schlossberg-Cohen; Philip Yordan
- Produced by: Jay Schlossberg-Cohen
- Starring: Eric Foster; Maurice Grandmaison; John Tallman
- Cinematography: Joseph D. Urbanczyk
- Music by: Fritz Heede
- Production company: Visto International Inc.
- Distributed by: Visto International Inc.
- Release date: 1987
- Running time: 93 minutes
- Country: United States
- Language: English

Cry Wilderness is a 1987 family adventure film directed by Jay Schlossberg-Cohen.

The film received negative reviews from critics and it was featured in a 2017 episode of the comedy television series Mystery Science Theater 3000.

== Plot ==
Paul is a boy attending boarding school on a field trip with his class to the Natural History Museum. Noticing that Paul has separated from the rest of the class, the headmaster, Mr. Douglas, goes looking for Paul to find him staring at a statue of Bigfoot. Paul tells Mr. Douglas that he met Bigfoot last summer while vacationing with his dad, Will, a park ranger, at the natural park where he works.

Meanwhile, the sheriff who presides over the park is rallying people to hunt a mysterious large animal that mauled a deer. This includes Will and his Native American friend Jim.

Later that night, Paul sees a mysterious flashing purple light in the window of his dorm and looks outside to see Bigfoot standing in a cloud of purple smoke. Bigfoot tells Paul that his father is in danger and he needs to go help him. After a confrontation with Mr. Douglas, Paul runs away and hitchhikes to the park, and meets his father. They return to Will’s cabin to find a strange man inside. He introduces himself as Morgan, a big game hunter, whom the sheriff has hired to hunt the large animal.

Will, Paul, Jim, and Morgan travel through the park to hunt the dangerous animal and find a strange ruin filled with crumpled-up Coke cans and a radio playing rock music, which Paul says he left behind last summer. The four leave the ruins, with Bigfoot hiding and staring at them.

Eventually, it is revealed that the animal they are tracking is a tiger. Will tells Jim to take Paul back to school because he’s concerned the hunt has gotten too dangerous. Paul repeatedly tries to run away from Jim, and they reach a lake where they meet the ghost of a Native American elder named Red Hawk. Red Hawk asks to speak to Paul alone and tells him that he must tell Bigfoot to run away to the mountains, or he will be killed by Morgan.

After several other incidents, the characters regroup and chase the tiger, which has fled to an abandoned Western mining town. They track the tiger into mining tunnels, and Will shoots the cat with a tranquilizer dart. Elsewhere, Paul tells Bigfoot that he must run away to the mountains. Meanwhile, one of the tunnels collapses on Will. Paul pleads for Bigfoot to help, and Bigfoot saves him by pulling the rocks off.

Morgan sees Bigfoot running away, eventually tracking the creature to the lake where Paul met Red Hawk, but when he goes to shoot him, Red Hawk appears, temporarily blinding Morgan with an agate Bigfoot amulet. Red Hawk’s pet eagle then claws Morgan’s eyes out. He stumbles into the lake and disappears.

Paul returns to school, handing in his final exam to Mr. Douglas before the Christmas holidays. Paul tells him that only kids can see Bigfoot, but adults can see him too if they believe hard enough. Paul’s own Bigfoot amulet then glows orange, and the two of them see the creature in a cloud of purple smoke.

== Cast ==
- Eric Foster as Paul Cooper
- Maurice Grandmaison as Will Cooper
- Griffin Casey as Morgan
- John Tallman as Jim
- Faith Clift as Dr. Helen Foster

== Production ==
Cry Wilderness was written by Philip Yordan. Yordan has had an estimated 100 writing credits in film since the 1940s, including 1945's Dillinger, the 1955 film noir classic The Big Combo, the 1962 film adaptation of The Day of the Triffids, and the 1964 Anthony Mann epic The Fall of the Roman Empire. In 1986, Yordan was hired by production company Visto International to make a Bigfoot movie, with the company having previously made a Sasquatch movie in 1978 that made a $4 million profit on a $150,000 budget. Writing the script became difficult for Yordan as he was told to cut out horror scenes and be restricted from adding any violence, profanity, or sex. These restrictions resulted in the script writer telling the distributor he would be writing a movie about nothing, to which the distributor acknowledged that is what they wanted.

Location shooting occurred at Balboa Park in San Diego, Mono Lake in Mono County, California and Devils Postpile National Monument in Madera County, California. The museum scene in the film was shot in the Children's Museum of Utah.

== Reception ==
The 1988 edition of The Motion Picture Guide gave the film zero stars, describing it as "an inane and poorly made feature", criticizing its acting while Eric Harwood for Variety called it one of the worst movies ever made. Dave DeNaui for The Bellingham Herald panned the film for its acting, story and dialogue, declaring the film to be "the worst film in five decades".

== Home media ==
The film was re-released on DVD in 2014 by Vinegar Syndrome alongside the 1970s documentary film In Search of Bigfoot.

== Mystery Science Theater 3000 ==
In 2017, the film was the subject of parody by Mystery Science Theater 3000, as the second episode of Season Eleven. Emily St. James for Vox considered the movie to be "so preposterous" it didn't need to be riffed. Paste's Jim Vorel, on the other hand, ranked it as the second best episode of season eleven, behind Wizards of the Lost Kingdom.

== See also ==
- Harry and the Hendersons
- List of films considered the worst
- Coca-Cola, featured prominently in the film
