= Willis Goldbeck =

American screenwriter

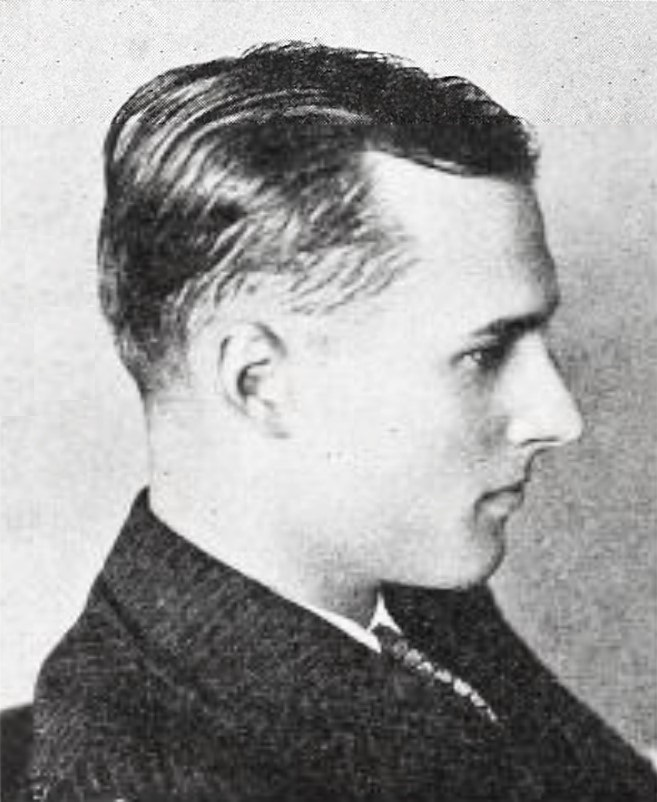
- From a 1925 magazine
- Born: October 24, 1898; New York City, New York, USA
- Died: September 17, 1979 (aged 80); Sag Harbor, New York, USA
- Occupations: Screenwriter; film director; film producer; journalist
- Years active: 1923–62

Willis Goldbeck (October 24, 1898 – September 17, 1979) was an American screenwriter, film director and producer. He wrote for 40 films between 1923 and 1962. He also directed ten films between 1942 and 1951. Willis graduated from Worcester Academy.

== Biography ==
Willis Goldbeck was born in New York City. A former journalist, Goldbeck entered films as a screenwriter in the early 1920s. He wrote most of the "Dr. Kildare" series for MGM, starting with the first one, Young Dr. Kildare (1938), and directed several of them. Although he directed several more films after that—including one of Burt Lancaster's early swashbucklers, Ten Tall Men (1951)—he mainly concentrated on screenwriting, and in the mid-1950s turned to producing. He retired from films in 1962. He died September 17, 1979, in Sag Harbor, New York, a month before his 81st birthday.

== Partial filmography ==
- The Side Show of Life (1924)
- Open All Night (1924)
- The Alaskan (1924)
- Peter Pan (1924)
- Flower of Night (1925)
- A Kiss for Cinderella (1925)
- Mare Nostrum (1926)
- Convoy (1927)
- The Garden of Allah (1927)
- The Enemy (1927)
- Lilac Time (1928)
- Diamond Handcuffs (1928)
- Wild Orchids (1929)
- Desert Nights (1929)
- Freaks (1932)
- The Penguin Pool Murder (1932)
- Murder on the Blackboard (1934)
- Wednesday's Child (1934)
- Two in the Dark (1936)
- The Garden of Allah (1936)
- Young Dr. Kildare (1938)
- Calling Dr. Kildare (1939)
- The Secret of Dr. Kildare (1939)
- Dr. Kildare's Strange Case (1940)
- Dr. Kildare Goes Home (1940)
- Dr. Kildare's Crisis (1940)
- The People vs. Dr. Kildare (1941)
- Dr. Kildare's Wedding Day (1941)
- Dr. Kildare's Victory (1942)
- Calling Dr. Gillespie (1942)
- Dr. Gillespie's New Assistant (1942)
- Dr. Gillespie's Criminal Case (1943)
- Rationing (1944)
- Three Men in White (1944)
- Between Two Women (1945)
- She Went to the Races (1945)
- Love Laughs at Andy Hardy (1946)
- Dark Delusion (1947)
- Johnny Holiday (1949)
- Ten Tall Men (1951)
- Tiger by the Tail (1955)
- The Colossus of New York (1958)
- Sergeant Rutledge (1960)
- The Man Who Shot Liberty Valance (1962)
