= The Secret of Dr. Kildare =

1939 film by Harold S. Bucquet

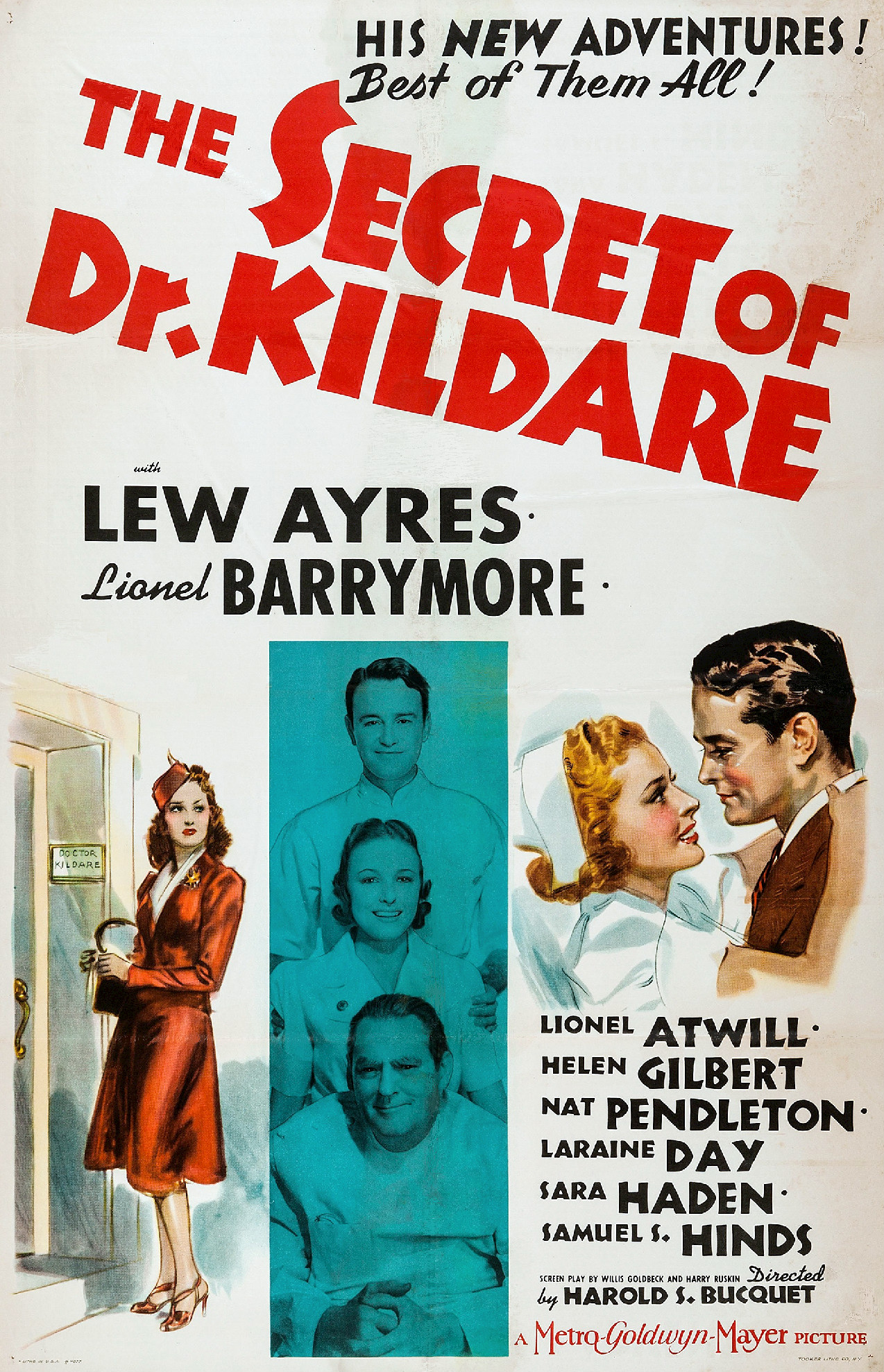
- Film poster
- Directed by: Harold S. Bucquet
- Screenplay by: Willis Goldbeck; Harry Ruskin
- Based on: The Secret of Dr. Kildare; 1939 article in Cosmopolitan by Max Brand
- Produced by: Lou L. Ostrow
- Starring: Lew Ayres; Lionel Barrymore; Lionel Atwill
- Cinematography: Alfred Gilks
- Edited by: Frank E. Hull
- Music by: David Snell
- Distributed by: Metro-Goldwyn-Mayer
- Release date: November 24, 1939
- Running time: 84 minutes
- Country: United States
- Language: English

The Secret of Dr. Kildare is a 1939 American film directed by Harold S. Bucquet and produced by Metro-Goldwyn-Mayer. This was the fourth of a total of ten Dr. Kildare pictures, Lew Ayres starred all but the first.

== Plot ==
Dr. Leonard Gillespie, racing against time in his battle with melanoma, is about to start an important research project at Blair General Hospital to improve the use a sulfa drug, sulfapyridine, as a cure for pneumonia with the help of his assistant, Dr. James Kildare. Paul Messenger, a Wall Street tycoon, asks for Gillespie's help in diagnosing the drastic, sudden personality changes that occur in his daughter Nancy. Gillespie assigns Kildare to pose as an old friend of the family in order to observe Nancy. At the same time, Gillespie borrows an airplane to fly Kildare around the country collecting blood samples for Gillespie to examine around the clock.

When Gillespie collapses from exhaustion, Kildare forces the cranky old doctor to take a rest as a patient and persuades Blair head of hospital Dr. Carew to assign him to work full-time on the Messenger case. Kildare's move forces Gillespie to put the project on hold and, while the old doctor goes fishing on a much needed vacation, Kildare, still hiding his identity as a doctor, begins to investigate the causes of Nancy's symptoms. He learns that Nancy's symptoms began to appear when she feared she had lost the love of her fiancé.

While talking with Nora, the family housekeeper, Kildare learns that Nancy suffers blinding headaches. Nora, who disdains all doctors because of their inability to help Nancy's mother, has convinced Nancy that she is suffering from the same type of brain tumor that killed her mother. Nora takes Nancy to see a nature healer named John Xerxes Archley, which prompts Kildare to admit that he is a doctor and dispute Archley's diagnosis of a "brain tumor" but alienates him from the family. With the help of ambulance driver Joe Wayman and his trusty monkey wrench, Kildare gets access to Nancy, who now has hysterical blindness.

Kildare tries to consult with the vacationing Gillespie over the girl's symptoms but is rebuffed. Gillespie returns to Blair ostensibly to give a lecture to the interns on treating psychosomatic symptoms. Following Gillespie's advice, Kildare pretends to operate on Nancy's eyes and arranges for the first person she sees afterwards to be her fiancé, thus curing her hysterical blindness. Meanwhile, Gillespie returns from his vacation revived and, realizing that Kildare quit the experiment only out of concern for his health, reconciles with his assistant. Together they embark again on their research into curing pneumonia.

== Cast ==
- Lew Ayres as Dr. James "Jimmy" Kildare
- Lionel Barrymore as Dr. Leonard Barry Gillespie
- Lionel Atwill as Paul Messenger
- Helen Gilbert as Nancy Messenger
- Nat Pendleton as Joe Wayman
- Laraine Day as Nurse Mary Lamont
- Sara Haden as Nora
- Samuel S. Hinds as Dr. Stephen Kildare
- Emma Dunn as Mrs. Martha Kildare
- Walter Kingsford as Dr. S.J. Carew
- Grant Mitchell as John Xerxes Archley
- Alma Kruger as Head Nurse Molly Byrd
- Robert Kent as Charles Herron
- Marie Blake as Sally, Telephone Operator
- Martha O'Driscoll as Mrs. Roberts
- Nell Craig as Nurse "Nosey" Parker
- George Reed as Conover
- Frank Orth as Mike Sullivan
- Alec Craig as Telephone repair man
- Emory Parnell as Policeman on Gaylore Ave.

== Censorship ==
The censors at the Hays Office requested changes to the script's discussions of pregnancy before they would approve it for production. One of the major issues they had with the script was that it explicitly included dialogue about the potential dangers of childbirth.

== See also ==
- Lionel Barrymore filmography
