= Harold S. Bucquet =

English film director

- Born: 10 April 1891; London, England
- Died: 13 February 1946 (aged 54); Los Angeles, California
- Occupation: Film director
- Years active: 1922–1945

Harold S. Bucquet (10 April 1891 – 13 February 1946) was an English film director. He directed 26 films between 1936 and 1945. His 1937 film Torture Money won an Academy Award for the Best Short Subject (Two-Reel). His 1943 short The Last Will and Testament of Tom Smith was preserved by the Academy Film Archive in 2008.

He was born in London, England and died in Los Angeles, California. He is interred at Glendale's Forest Lawn Memorial Park Cemetery.

== Selected filmography ==
- The Guardsman (1931), assistant director
- Torture Money (1937)
- Young Dr. Kildare (1938)
- They're Always Caught (1938)
- Calling Dr. Kildare (1939)
- On Borrowed Time (1939)
- Dr. Kildare's Crisis (1940)
- We Who Are Young (1940)
- Dr. Kildare Goes Home (1940)
- Kathleen (1941)
- The Penalty (1941)
- Dr. Kildare's Victory (1941)
- Dr. Kildare's Wedding Day (1941)
- The War Against Mrs. Hadley (1942)
- The Adventures of Tartu (1943)
- Dragon Seed (1944)
- Without Love (1945)
