= Beau Brummell (1954 film) =

1954 film by Curtis Bernhardt

- Original French film poster
- Directed by: Curtis Bernhardt
- Screenplay by: Karl Tunberg
- Based on: Beau Brummel (1890 play) by Clyde Fitch
- Produced by: Sam Zimbalist
- Starring: Stewart Granger; Peter Ustinov; Elizabeth Taylor; Robert Morley
- Cinematography: Oswald Morris
- Edited by: Frank Clarke
- Music by: Richard Addinsell; Miklós Rózsa
- Production company: Metro-Goldwyn-Mayer
- Distributed by: Loew's, Inc
- Release date: 1 October 1954
- Running time: 113 minutes
- Country: United Kingdom
- Language: English
- Budget: $1.8 million
- Box office: $2.7 million

Beau Brummell is a 1954 British historical film released by Metro-Goldwyn-Mayer. It was directed by Curtis Bernhardt and produced by Sam Zimbalist from a screenplay by Karl Tunberg, based on the 1890 play Beau Brummell by Clyde Fitch. The play was previously adapted as a silent film made in 1924 and starring John Barrymore as Beau Brummell, Mary Astor, and Willard Louis as the Prince of Wales.

The music score was by Richard Addinsell with Miklós Rózsa. The film stars Stewart Granger as Beau Brummell, Elizabeth Taylor as Lady Patricia Belham, and Peter Ustinov as the Prince of Wales.

== Plot ==
Set in the latter years of the reign of King George III, George Bryan "Beau" Brummell, a captain in the Army, is on a military parade inspected by George, The Prince of Wales, the future King George IV, and they argue about the uniform being impractical for active military life. It is here Brummell meets Lady Patricia Belham, who is accompanying Mrs. Maria Anne Fitzherbert, the mistress of the Prince. As it is the Prince who has designed the uniform personally, the Prince instructs Brummell to get off parade and, after a further argument at dinner, Brummell is dismissed from the Army in disgrace.

Upon entering life outside of the Army, Brummell makes his criticisms known of the Prince publicly and his comments are published in the newspapers. He is subsequently summoned to the Prince to be admonished personally, but after some discussion, they in fact become friends. As a friend and close advisor of the Prince of Wales (despite being the grandson of a valet), Brummell becomes a fashionable man in London society, known for his exquisite taste and setting fashion trends among the elite. However, he is growing increasingly in debt.

Brummell initially sees the friendship as the path to wealth and position, and in due course the Prince promises to make Brummell an earl. Meanwhile, Lady Patricia has fallen secretly in love with Brummell, despite being betrothed to the less exciting Lord Edwin Mercer (another friend and advisor of the Prince), but he has wealth, rank and position -- everything Brummell does not have. Brummell convinces the Prince to see his father, King George III, who has been mentally unwell in Windsor Castle to try and break the influence of William Pitt, the Prime Minister. However, Lady Patricia finally decides to marry Lord Edwin and break with Brummell and, following Mrs Fitzherbert's decision to leave England, the Prince becomes more and more unhappy.

Parliament offers the Prince the opportunity of a Regency which would give him the power to administer the Royal Marriages Act (meaning as he exercised the powers of the Sovereign, he could legally marry Mrs Fitzherbert), but without the power to grant peerages. Brummell advises the Prince to decline the Regency, and Lord Edwin (who was aware of Lady Patricia's former love for Brummell) speaks out against Brummell. The Prince accuses Brummell that he has ulterior motives and is only interested in getting a title and has advised him poorly. As news of the Prince and Brummell's disagreement becomes public, so does his spiralling debts. At a society ball (which he has to attend to try and keep his creditors thinking that he still has influence at Court), Brummell publicly insults the Prince, despite Mrs. Fitzherbert and Lord Byron trying to broker a reconciliation, and he is forced to flee to France to avoid his creditors. The Prince subsequently succeeds to the Throne as King George IV and plans a State Visit to France, where Brummell has fled, living penniless in very modest lodgings. Deeply in debt, unwell, and out of favour, Brummell decides to write his memoirs, but once he realizes that the book will embarrass the new King, Brummell destroys it, acknowledging that his friendship with the King is still more important than the £20,000 offered by the publisher. While he lies dying, Brummell is visited by the new King. They both regret their rift and have a heartfelt reconciliation moments before Brummell's death.

== Cast ==
- Stewart Granger as George Bryan "Beau" Brummell
- Elizabeth Taylor as Lady Patricia Belham
- Peter Ustinov as the Prince of Wales
- Robert Morley as King George III
- James Donald as Lord Edwin Mercer
- James Hayter as Mortimer, Brummell's servant
- Rosemary Harris as Mrs. Maria Anne Fitzherbert
- Paul Rogers as William Pitt, the Prime Minister
- Noel Willman as Lord George Gordon Byron
- Peter Dyneley as Midger, an army officer
- Charles Carson as Sir Geoffrey Baker, physician to the King
- Ernest Clark as Doctor Warren, physician to the King
- Peter Bull as Mr. Fox, MP
- Mark Dignam as Mr. Burke, MP
- Desmond Roberts as colonel of the Regiment
- David Horne as Thurlow
- Ralph Truman as Sir Ralph Sidley, MP
- George De Warfaz as Doctor Dubois, Brummell's doctor in France
- Henry Oscar as Doctor Willis, physician to the King
- Harold Kasket as local French mayor
- Elwyn Brook-Jones as Mr. Tupp (uncredited)
- Finlay Currie as McIver, Brummel's publisher (uncredited)
- Bessie Love as maid (uncredited)

== Production ==
=== Development ===
Clyde Fitch's play was written in 1890 as a vehicle for Richard Mansfield.

In 1946, there was plans to make a British film about Brummel, which never materialized.

=== Casting ===
In March 1951, MGM announced they would make a film from Fitch's play as a vehicle for Stewart Granger, who had starred in King Solomon's Mines (1950) for the studio and been signed to a long-term contract. The producer would be Sam Zimbalist, who produced Mines. It was to follow the filming of The Light Touch. In June John Lee Mahin was assigned to write the script.

Filming was pushed back to enable Granger to make other films including Scaramouche, The Prisoner of Zenda (both 1952), All the Brothers Were Valiant, Young Bess (both 1953), and Robinson Crusoe. (The last project was not made).

In January 1953, Hedda Hopper announced the film would star Granger and Eleanor Parker who had just teamed successfully on Scaramouche. In April, Deborah Kerr was announced.

As late as May 1953, Granger was still expected to make Robinson Crusoe before Beau Brummell. The same month, Gottfried Reinhardt was assigned to direct. Robinson Crusoe was postponed due to the release of the Mexican film based on the novel. In July, Parker was still to be the co-star.

In July 1953, Kirk Douglas announced he would star as Brummell in his own Brummell project, to be called The Beau. However, it was not made.

In September 1953, Dore Schary, head of MGM, gave the job of directing to Curtis Bernhardt. By November 1953, Karl Tunberg was working on the script and he would receive sole credit.

=== Shooting ===
Filming began in London on 15 November 1953.

== Reception ==
=== Premiere ===
The film was given a Royal Command Film Performance in London in November 1954 where it was shown to an audience of 10,000 including Queen Elizabeth II and the Duke of Edinburgh. Some criticized this as being in bad taste as the film featured scenes depicting George III, an ancestor of the Queen, being insane. Granger did not like the film.

=== Box-office ===
According to MGM records the film earned $1,049,000 in the US and $1,652,000 elsewhere. In France, it recorded admissions of 634,778.

The film recorded a loss of $383,000.

== Historical accuracy ==
In the film, Brummell describes himself as grandson of a valet and son of "a secretary to a nobleman." The real Brummell's father, William Brummell, was a London confectioner who later became private secretary to former Prime Minister Lord North, and later still a landowner in Berkshire by time of his death in 1795.

The deathbed reconciliation between a dying Brummell and the Prince, who as George IV is passing through Le Havre when visiting France, is an anachronism; Brummell died at Caen in 1840 having survived George, who died in 1830, by almost ten years.

Elizabeth Taylor's character was a combination of several women in Brummell's life.
