= Mogambo =

1953 American romantic drama film

- Original movie poster
- Directed by: John Ford
- Screenplay by: John Lee Mahin
- Based on: Red Dust 1928 play by Wilson Collison; Red Dust 1932 film by Victor Fleming
- Produced by: Sam Zimbalist
- Starring: Clark Gable; Ava Gardner; Grace Kelly
- Cinematography: Robert Surtees; Freddie Young
- Edited by: Frank Clarke
- Music by: Robert Burns
- Production company: Metro-Goldwyn-Mayer
- Distributed by: Loew's, Inc.
- Release dates: September 23, 1953 (San Francisco); October 1, 1953 (New York City); October 9, 1953
- Running time: 115 minutes
- Countries: United States; United Kingdom
- Language: English
- Budget: $3.1 million
- Box office: $8.3 million

Mogambo is a 1953 Technicolor adventure/romantic drama film directed by John Ford and starring Clark Gable, Ava Gardner, and Grace Kelly, and featuring Donald Sinden.

It was shot on location in colonial British East Africa, Tanganyika, Uganda Protectorate, and French Congo, with a musical soundtrack consisting almost entirely of traditional music recorded in Congo.

The film was adapted by John Lee Mahin from the play Red Dust (1928) by Wilson Collison. It is considered a remake of the film Red Dust (1932), which was set in Vietnam and also starred Gable in the same role.

The original trailer for the film claimed that "Mogambo" meant "the greatest" but, in fact, the word has no meaning at all. Producer Sam Zimbalist came up with the title by altering the name of the Mocambo, a famous Hollywood nightclub.

== Plot ==
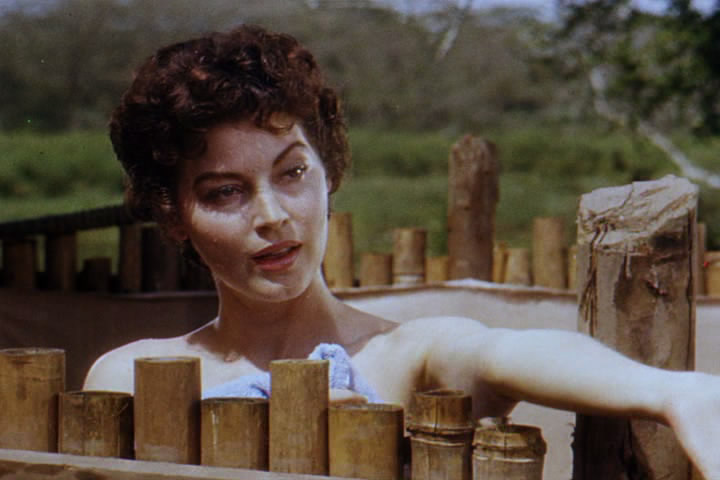
Ava Gardner in Mogambo

New York socialite Eloise "Honey Bear" Kelly arrives at a remote African outpost, looking for a rich maharaja acquaintance, only to find he has cancelled his trip owing to unrest in his realm. While waiting for the next river boat out, she spars with hardworking big game hunter and wild animal catcher Victor Marswell from the United States, who initially views her as disreputable. Marswell's business partner is plucky Englishman and big game hunter John Brown-Pryce, known as "Brownie." "Brownie" is sympathetic to Kelly, and believes that her "scars aren't visible, but they're there." Marswell also has a semi-hostile relationship with his employee, the gruff Russian Leon Boltchak. Kelly and Marswell later develop a mutual attraction and make love. Then the river boat brings London couple Donald Nordley and his wife Linda. Honey Bear takes the steamer out with the British skipper at Marswell's urging, although she would prefer to stay with Marswell and he expresses some regret at their parting. The Nordleys wish to go on safari to record the cries of gorillas. Marswell declines to guide them there due to the difficulties involved and insists that they be guided on the agreed route by his assistant, despite the Nordleys' protests. Honey Bear rejoins the group after the steamer suffers engine failure and subsequently runs aground.

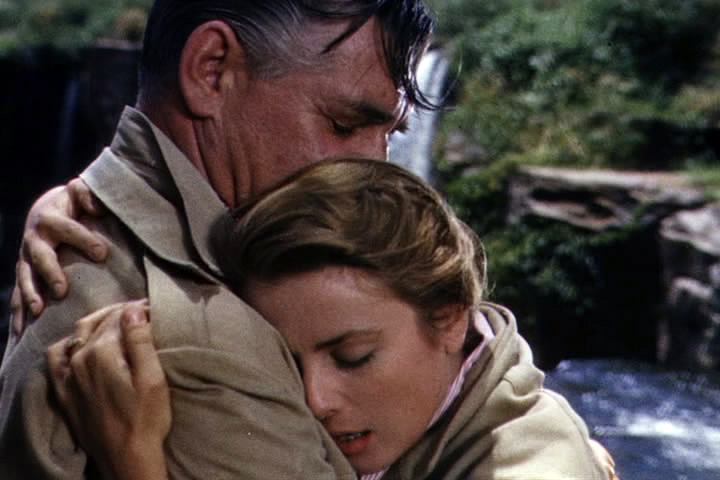
Clark Gable and Grace Kelly in Mogambo

Marswell rescues Linda from a panther, and Honey Bear sees that they are attracted to one another. After Marswell talks to Linda privately, he agrees to take the Nordleys into gorilla country, while also taking Honey Bear part of the way to join the district commissioner, who can then take her back to civilization. However, they find the commissioner mortally wounded by recently belligerent Samburu tribesmen. With reinforcements days away, the small party narrowly escapes, taking the commissioner with them. Meanwhile, a serious romance is developing between Marswell and Linda. Only Donald is blind to the situation. Marswell plans to tell him about how he and Linda feel, but has second thoughts after realizing how much Donald loves his wife and perhaps how she would be better off remaining with him. The situation is aggravated when Marswell reluctantly shoots a gorilla to save Donald, blowing a chance to capture a baby gorilla. Marswell goes back to camp, depressed, and begins drinking heavily in his tent. Honey Bear joins him.

When Linda appears, she finds them cuddling. Marswell decides he can fix everything by making Linda hate him and makes a show of this cuddling followed by dismissive remarks about Linda's infatuation with "the White Hunter" to enrage her. Unfortunately, his ploy works too well when Linda shoots him with his own pistol, wounding him in the arm. Honey Bear lies to the others, telling them that Marswell had been making advances to Linda for some time, finally forcing Linda to shoot him in his drunken state. The next day, the party breaks camp to head back, leaving Marswell behind to try to capture young gorillas to pay for the safari. Marswell, acknowledging to himself his feelings for Honey Bear, asks her to stay and then proposes to her, but she rebuffs him. As the canoes set off, however, she suddenly jumps into the water and wades her way back to him.

== Cast ==
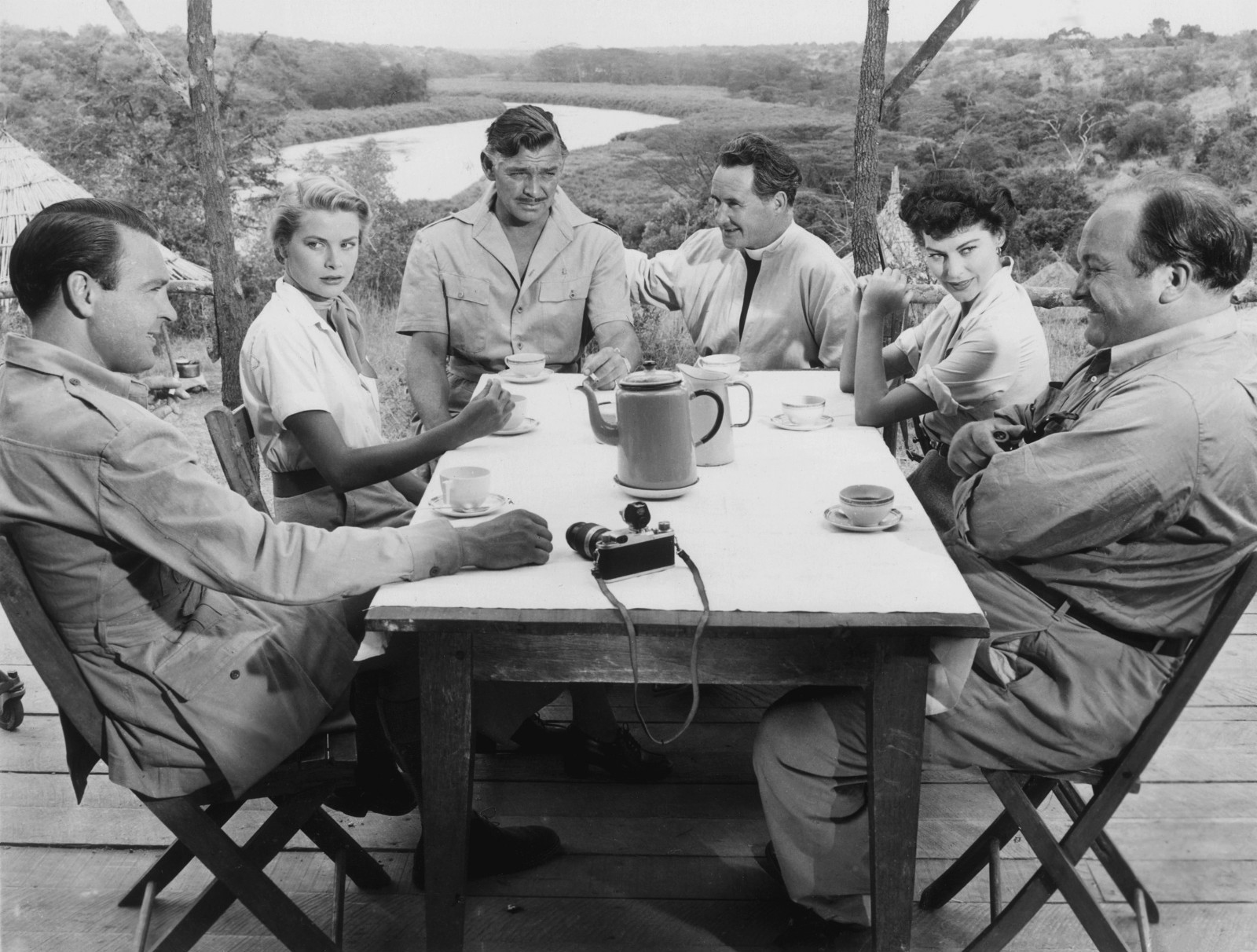
Mogambo cast with Donald Sinden, Grace Kelly, Clark Gable, Denis O'Dea, Ava Gardner and Philip Stainton

- Clark Gable as Victor Marswell
- Ava Gardner as Eloise "Honey Bear" Kelly
- Grace Kelly as Linda Nordley
- Donald Sinden as Donald Nordley
- Philip Stainton as John Brown-Pryce
- Eric Pohlmann as Leon Boltchak
- Laurence Naismith as Skipper
- Denis O'Dea as Father Josef

== Production ==
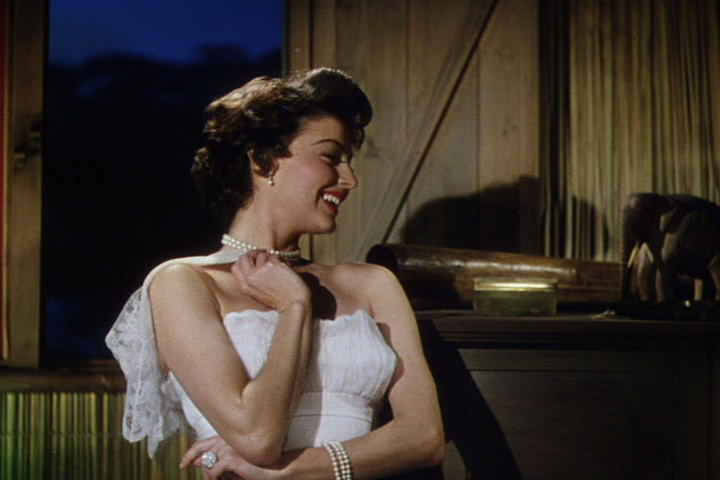
Ava Gardner in Mogambo

=== Development ===
In 1946, the Los Angeles Times reported MGM was considering remaking Red Dust with Marilyn Maxwell as a possible star. In March 1948, Marie McDonald reportedly screen tested for the Jean Harlow part. In May 1949, Maxwell and Gene Kelly were being considered for lead roles.

The studio had a great deal of success with color remakes of older films shot on location overseas, including King Solomon's Mines (1950) and Quo Vadis (1951). In August 1951, MGM announced it would make Mogambo, shot on location in Africa. The producer would be Sam Zimbalist who had made King Solomon's Mines, and the star would be Clark Gable.

In February 1952, Zimbalist scouted locations in Africa for six weeks. In June, John Ford agreed to direct.

=== Casting ===
Shelley Winters was mentioned as a possible co-star. Patricia Neal also was discussed. In June 1952, Ava Gardner signed.

Grace Kelly was not the first choice for the role of Linda Nordley. Gene Tierney withdrew because she did not want to leave Aly Khan in Paris.

=== Shooting ===
Gable arrived in Kenya on 1 November 1952 and was given an armed guard due to the Mau Mau Uprising.

Filming started 17 November. It was done on location in Okalataka, French Congo as well as Mount Kenya, Thika, Kenya, with Mount Longonot and Lake Naivasha, both in the Kenyan Rift Valley, and Fourteen Falls near Thika seen as backdrops, and Kagera River, Tanganyika. Other scenes were filmed in the area of Archer's Post and Isiolo. Interiors were shot at the MGM-British Studios, in Borehamwood, Hertfordshire, England.

Frank Allen and his wife were guides during the six week-safari that constituted location filming.

The shoot was difficult. There was a rumor Clark Gable was going to be assassinated by the Mau Mau, so John Ford moved a location. Two of the crew were revealed to be Mau Mau. The unit was plagued by rain and had a deleterious effect on the already poor quality of the roads. Three of the crew were killed in road accidents, including assistant director John Hancock.

Donald Sinden, then a contract star for the Rank Organisation at Pinewood Studios, recalled:

"Ten White Hunters were seconded to our unit for our protection and to provide fresh meat. Among them were Viscount Mandeville and Marcus, Lord Wallscourt, a delightful man whom Ford treated abysmally - sometimes very sadistically. In Ford's eyes the poor man could do nothing right and was continually being bawled out in front of the entire unit (in some ways he occasionally took the heat off me). None of us could understand the reason for this appalling treatment, which the dear kind man in no way deserved. He himself was quite at a loss. Several weeks later we discovered the cause from Ford's brother-in-law: before emigrating to America, Ford's grandfather had been a labourer on the estate in Ireland of the then Lord Wallscourt: Ford was now getting his own back at his descendant. Not a charming sight. Before leaving camp on the first morning [of shooting] I had been told to report to the hair-dressing departments tent, where I found the make-up men armed with electric clippers: 'I have to remove the hair from your chest.' 'Whatever for?' I asked, 'Orders.' It transpired that Clark [Gable], whose chest was completely devoid of hair, had always insisted that no other actor should appear on film exposing a hirsute breast. This included any member of the crew not wearing a shirt as well. He considered it a slight on his masculinity. We now had to return to the MGM Studios in London to shoot all the interior scenes. Someone must have pointed out to Ford that he had been thoroughly foul to me during the entire location shoot and when I arrived for my first day's work I found that he had caused a large notice to be painted at the entrance to our sound stage in capital letters reading "BE KIND TO DONALD WEEK". He was as good as his word - for precisely seven days. On the eighth day he ripped the sign down and returned to his normal bullying behaviour."

=== Post-production ===
Except for Gardner accompanied by player piano, the music featured in the film was by local traditional performers, unusual for Hollywood at the time.

== Reception ==
The film was a hit — according to MGM records it made $4,576,000 in the US and Canada and $3,692,000 elsewhere, resulting in a profit of $2,026,000.

In his October 2, 1953 review for The New York Times, Bosley Crowther observes that the film “has a great deal more to do with the low-down romantic maneuvering of two colorful and popular stars than with the thrills of adventuring in Africa, …Some handsome color shots of open country are slipped in from time to time, ... But the interest is basically centered in the civilized stalking of the stars. And it is meant as no insult to Mr. Gable to say that he is the most important gorilla bagged. In the advancement of the romance, which itself is hot stuff, for what it is, several capable actors do entertaining jobs. Mr. Gable is beautifully commanding, in his vicious, sardonic way, and Miss Gardner, as we say, is as enticing as any calculated vampire can be. …Grace Kelly as the stuffy English dame, Donald Sinden as her pip-pip hubby and Eric Pohlmann as a hand are all right, too. The trouble is simply that more of them meant less of the animals.” The movie premiered at the Radio City Music Hall.

James Bacon, writing a capsule review for the AP's Bob Thomas' Hollywood on September 16, 1953, had a similar reaction: “It seems everybody both here and around the country has been hoping Clark Gable would get a good picture. King Gable actually hasn't had one good movie since his return from World War II service. He's got it now in "Mogambo," even though it's a remake of "Red Dust" one of his greatest hits of the '30s. Gable is virile as ever as when he was a much younger man.”

It has a 79% rating on Rotten Tomatoes, based on 14 reviews.

In 2025, The Hollywood Reporter listed Mogambo as having the best stunts of the year.

== Awards and honors ==
Grace Kelly won a Golden Globe Award for Best Supporting Actress, and the film was nominated for two Oscars: Best Actress (Gardner) and Best Supporting Actress (Kelly). The film also was nominated for a BAFTA Award for Best Film.
