= Ted W. Lawson =

United States Army Air Forces officer

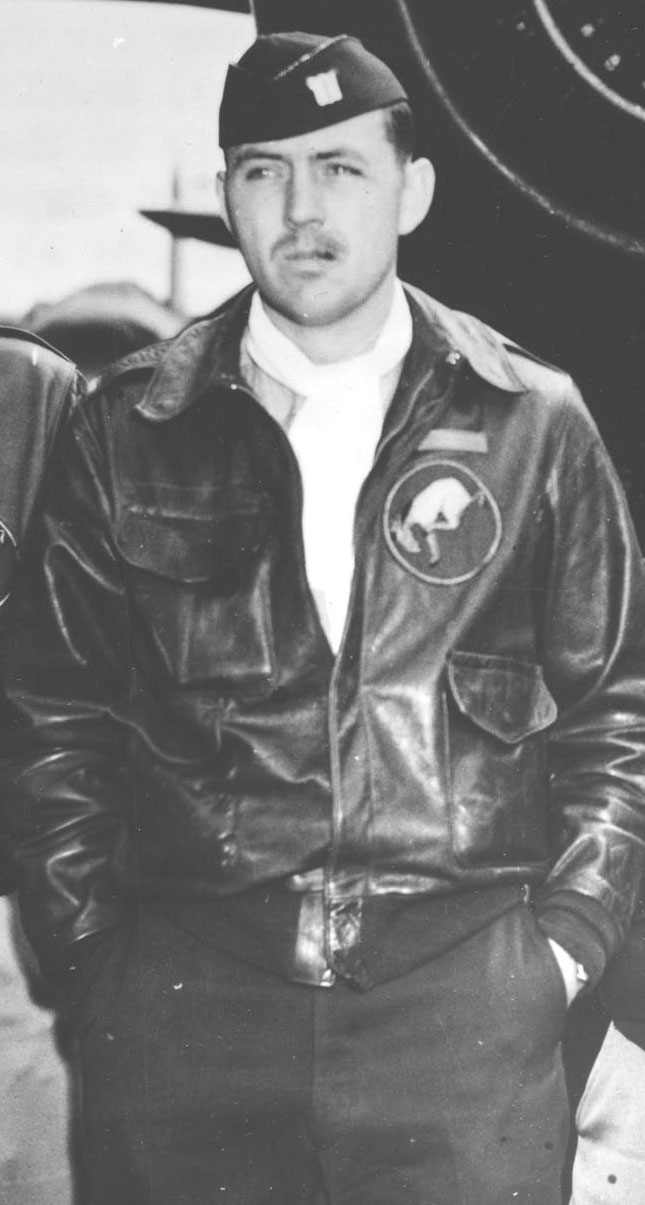
- Born: March 7, 1917; Fresno, California
- Died: January 19, 1992 (aged 74); Chico, California
- Burial place: Chico Cemetery Mausoleum
- Military career
- Allegiance: United States
- Branch: United States Army Air Forces
- Service years: 1940–1945
- Rank: Major
- Unit: 17th Bombardment Group
- Commands: Liaison Officer
- Conflicts: World War II; Doolittle Raid
- Awards: Distinguished Flying Cross; Purple Heart; Chinese Army, Navy, and Air Corps Medal, Class A, 1st Grade
- Other work: Author

Major Ted William Lawson (March 7, 1917 – January 19, 1992) was an American military officer in the United States Army Air Forces, who is known as the author of Thirty Seconds Over Tokyo, a memoir of his participation in the 1942 Doolittle Raid on Tokyo during World War II. The book was subsequently adapted into the 1944 film of the same name starring Spencer Tracy, Van Johnson and Robert Mitchum.

== Early life ==
Lawson was born in Alameda, California, and attended Los Angeles City College from 1937–1938. He joined the U.S. Army Air Corps as an aviation cadet in March 1940 while a student studying aeronautical engineering by day and working nights in the drafting department of Douglas Aircraft Company. After basic flight instruction at Hancock Field, Santa Maria, California, Lawson attended primary flying training at Randolph Field and advanced training at Kelly Field, receiving his pilot's wings and commission as a second lieutenant on 15 November 1940.

Lawson was assigned to the 95th Bomb Squadron, 17th Bomb Group (Medium) at McChord Field, Washington. He was assigned as a co-pilot flying B-18 Bolo medium bombers and checked out in the Douglas B-23 Dragon. He became a first pilot in February 1941 and two months later the group received seven B-25 Mitchells, the first of the new medium bombers to be assigned to a unit in the Air Corps.

While his squadron was based at McChord, Lawson married Ellen Arlene Reynolds, a librarian at LACC he had met while a student, in Spokane on 5 September 1941. His best man at the ceremony was squadron-mate Lt. Robert M. Gray, who would be a fellow pilot on the Doolittle Raid.

== World War II ==
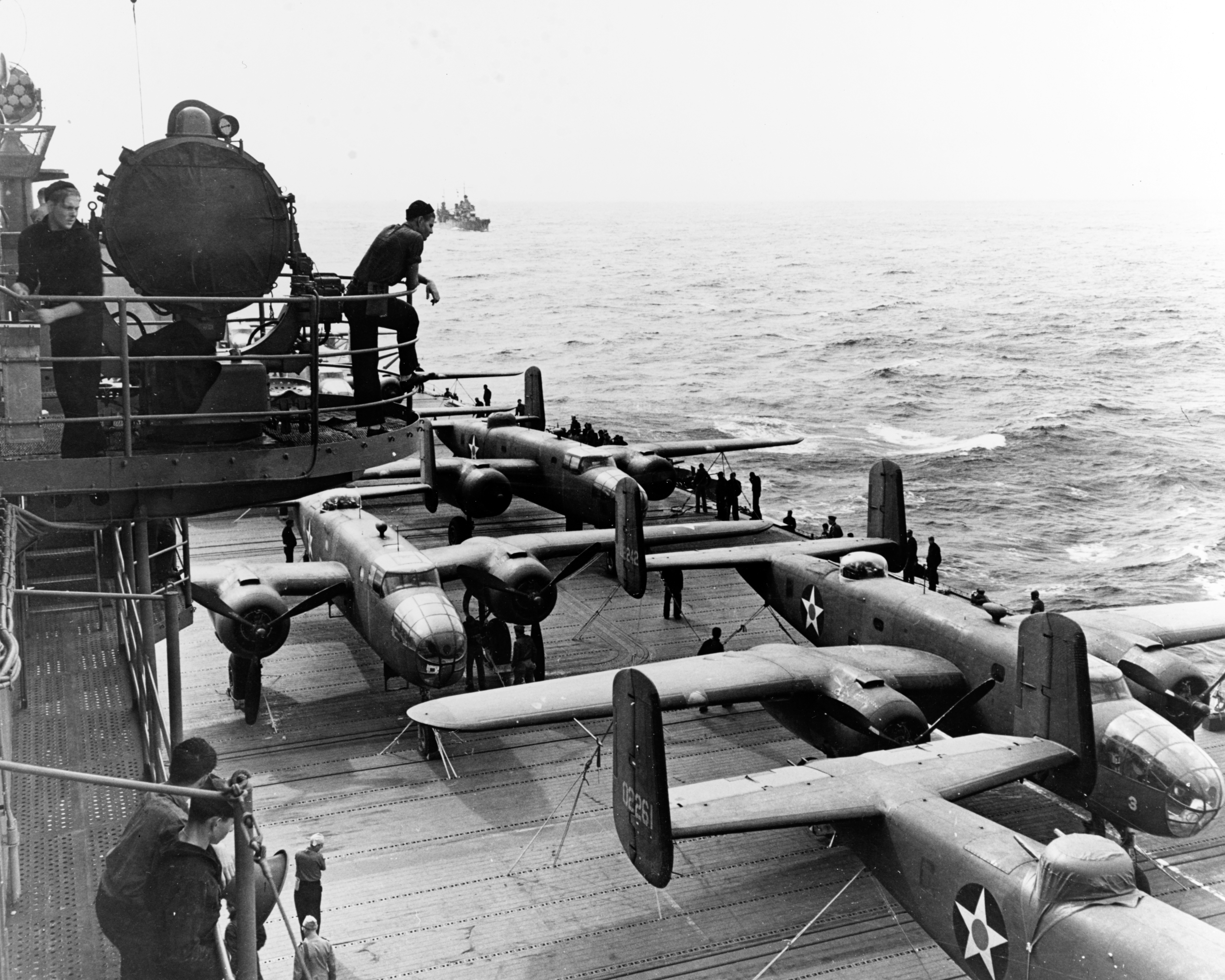
Lawson's aircraft (foreground) and other B-25s on deck of USS Hornet

In early 1941, Lawson, then a First Lieutenant, was flying antisubmarine patrols with the 17th Bombardment Group out of Pendleton, Oregon. As the first Army Air Corps group to receive the B-25 Mitchell, the 17th BG had the most experienced pilots and so was ordered from Oregon to Lexington County Army Air Base at Columbia, South Carolina, ostensibly to fly similar patrols off the East Coast of the United States but actually to prepare for the mission against Japan. The group officially transferred effective 9 February to Columbia, where its combat crews were offered the opportunity to volunteer for an "extremely hazardous" but unspecified mission. On 17 February the group was detached from the Eighth Air Force.

Lieutenant Lawson was accepted as a volunteer for the mission, led by then-Lieutenant Colonel Jimmy Doolittle to bomb Tokyo and several other cities with 16 carrier-launched B-25 Mitchell bombers from aboard USS Hornet. This became the first air raid on mainland Japan during World War II, following the Pearl Harbor attack.

The aircraft that Lawson flew on the raid was nicknamed "The Ruptured Duck" (AAF serial 40-2261). According to Lawson in his book, the plane's unusual name evolved from a minor training accident where the aircraft tail scraped the ground on take-off. Soon after, Lawson found someone had written "ruptured duck" in chalk on the fuselage. Inspired, he had B-25 gunner Cpl. Roger Lovelace create the now-famous caricature of Donald Duck with crutches and wearing pilot's headphones.

The mission was launched 170 miles (275 km) farther out than planned, and after bombing their targets in Japan, all of the bombers ran out of fuel short of their intended recovery airfields in non-Japanese occupied China. Lawson and his crew crashed their B-25 off the coast of the small island of Nantien when its engines failed while trying to land on the beach during a heavy storm. Lawson and his co-pilot were both thrown through the windscreen of the B-25, with Lawson suffering a compound fracture of the left leg, a lacerated left bicep, and severe facial injuries in the process.

All five crew members survived the crash; however all but flight engineer/gunner David J. Thatcher received serious injuries. Bombardier Robert Clever would be returned to the U.S., only to die in another plane crash in November, 1942. After he was transported by friendly Chinese throughout several provinces in China to evade Japanese troops searching for his crew, Lawson's infected leg was amputated by the mission's flight surgeon, Lt Thomas R. White, who had volunteered to fly the mission as a gunner with the crew of Lt. Donald Smith's aircraft. The nose art of the crashed bomber, "The Ruptured Duck", was later salvaged by the Japanese and put on display in Tokyo.

=== Author ===
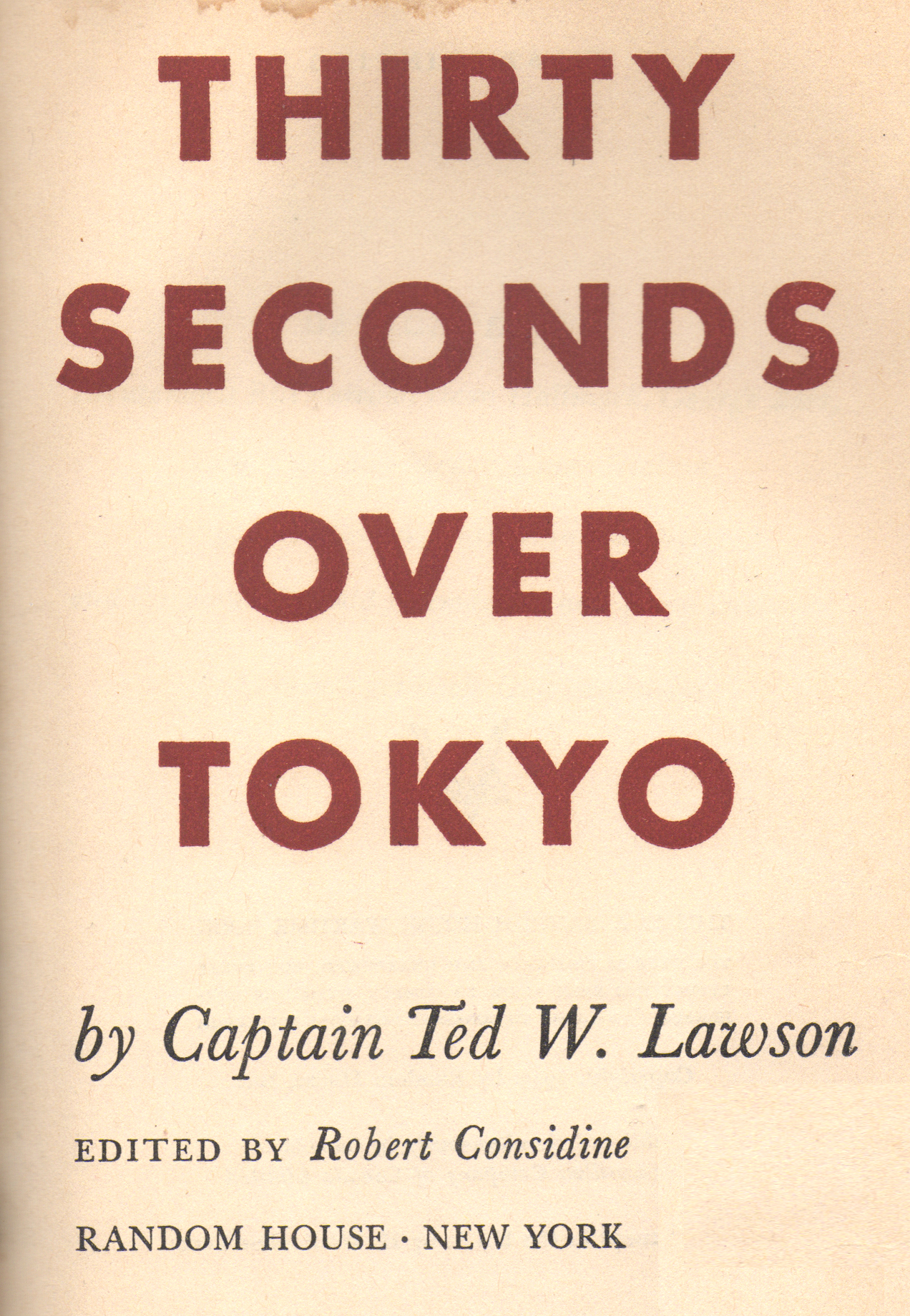
Title page of 1943 Random House first edition

In January 1943, Lawson and newspaper columnist Bob Considine decided to write a book about the mission, entitled Thirty Seconds Over Tokyo. In four nights and two days in the Mayflower Hotel in Washington, D.C., the entire story was worked out, although approval to publish the book was not given until after information about the raid was released by the War Department in April 1943.

Thirty Seconds Over Tokyo first appeared serialized in six issues of Collier's magazine, from May 22 to June 26, 1943. It was also published later that year by Random House in a 220-page hardback "wartime book" (5 1/4 in × 7 3/4 in; 13 cm × 20 cm) format.

Through friends in the Los Angeles area, Ted made contact with Metro-Goldwyn-Mayer producer Sam Zimbalist, and the film version was launched in 1944, starring Van Johnson as Lawson, alongside Spencer Tracy and Robert Mitchum. It won an Academy Award for Best Special Effects. In 2003, Brassey's reprinted Thirty Seconds Over Tokyo with more photos and an introduction from Lawson's widow, Ellen.

== Later life ==
Along with the majority of the surviving Doolittle Raiders, Lawson was eventually repatriated back to the United States, and in his case, for further medical care including a second amputation of his injured leg and reconstruction of his lower face. During his recuperation, Lawson was promoted to captain in accordance with Doolittle's recommendation that all the raiders be promoted one grade, and later to major. He served as Liaison Officer, U.S. Air Mission, Santiago, Chile from May 1943 until April 1944. He was retired from the U.S. Army Air Forces for physical disability on February 2, 1945. His decorations include the Distinguished Flying Cross, Purple Heart, and the Chinese Army, Navy, and Air Corps Medal, Class A, 1st Grade.

After the war, Lawson owned and operated a machine shop in Southern California, and also worked for Reynolds Metals as a liaison between the company and the military. He died at his home in Chico, California, on January 19, 1992, and was interred at the Chico Cemetery Mausoleum.

== Honors and tributes ==
Lawson Army Airfield at Fort Benning, Georgia is partially named for Ted W. Lawson. It was originally named only for Walter R. Lawson (no relation to Ted), an Army Air Corps flyer who earned the Distinguished Service Cross in World War I. Several years later, after the Doolittle Raid in World War II, Ted W. Lawson's name was added to the memorial at the field.

The Pacific Aviation Museum Pearl Harbor, located on Ford Island, has on display a B-25 done in the livery of Lawson's aircraft from the Doolittle Raid.

== Military Awards ==

USAAF Pilot Badge
Distinguished Flying Cross	Purple Heart	American Defense Service Medal
American Campaign Medal	Asiatic-Pacific Campaign Medal	World War II Victory Medal

== See also ==
- Doolittle Raid
- Thirty Seconds Over Tokyo
