= Thirty Seconds Over Tokyo =

1944 American war film by Mervyn LeRoy

- Theatrical release poster
- Directed by: Mervyn LeRoy
- Screenplay by: Dalton Trumbo
- Based on: Thirty Seconds Over Tokyo; 1943 novel by Ted W. Lawson; Robert Considine
- Produced by: Sam Zimbalist
- Starring: Van Johnson; Robert Walker; Spencer Tracy
- Cinematography: Robert Surtees; Harold Rosson
- Edited by: Frank Sullivan
- Music by: Herbert Stothart
- Production company: Metro-Goldwyn-Mayer
- Distributed by: Loew's Inc.
- Release date: November 15, 1944
- Running time: 138 minutes
- Country: United States
- Language: English
- Budget: $2.9 million
- Box office: $6.2 million

Thirty Seconds Over Tokyo is a 1944 American war film produced by Metro-Goldwyn-Mayer. The screenplay by Dalton Trumbo is based on the 1943 book of the same name by Captain Ted W. Lawson, who was a pilot on the historic Doolittle Raid, America's first retaliatory air strike against Japan, four months after the December 7, 1941, Japanese attack on Pearl Harbor. The raid was planned, led by, and named after United States Army Air Forces Lieutenant Colonel James Doolittle, who was promoted two ranks, to brigadier general, the day after the raid.

Sam Zimbalist was the film's producer and Mervyn LeRoy directed. The picture stars Van Johnson as Lawson, Phyllis Thaxter as his wife Ellen, Robert Walker as Corporal David Thatcher, Robert Mitchum as Lieutenant Bob Gray, and Spencer Tracy as Lieutenant Colonel—and soon General Jimmy Doolittle. Tracy's appearance in the film is more in the nature of a guest star; he received special billing rather than his usual top billing and had considerably less screen time than star Van Johnson.

In the book, Lawson gives an eyewitness account of the intensive training, the mission, and the aftermath as experienced by his crew and others who flew the mission on April 18, 1942. Lawson piloted the Ruptured Duck, the seventh of 16 B-25s to take off from the aircraft carrier USS Hornet. The film depicts the raid accurately and uses actual wartime footage of the bombers.

== Plot ==
Not long after the Pearl Harbor attack, United States Army Air Forces Lieutenant Colonel James Doolittle assembles two dozen North American B-25 Mitchell medium bombers with volunteer crews at Eglin Field, Florida, for a secret mission. Among them is Ted Lawson and his crew, co-pilot Lieutenant Dean Davenport, navigator Lieutenant Charles McClure, bombardier Lieutenant Bob Clever, and gunner-mechanic Corporal David Thatcher. Given the opportunity to decline the mission, the crews opt to stay on, including Lawson, whose pregnant wife Ellen joins him at Eglin Field.

The crews are taught to take off from a runway only 500 feet long by a naval aviator from nearby Pensacola Naval Air Station. Lawson's plane acquires the nickname Ruptured Duck with nose art to match. Doolittle leads the group on a low-level flight at hedge-top height to Naval Air Station Alameda, California, where their planes are loaded aboard the aircraft carrier USS Hornet. He informs the men their mission is to bomb Tokyo, Yokohama, Osaka, Kobe, and Nagoya. They will launch from the carrier 400 miles from Japan and after dropping their payloads, continue to designated landing spots in parts of China controlled by Nationalist forces and regroup in Chungking. When an enemy surface vessel discovers the convoy, the crews are forced to take off 12 hours earlier than planned, attack in broad daylight over Japan, and land after nightfall in China.

Doolittle leads the raid, dropping incendiary bombs to mark key targets for the others. The Ruptured Duck arrives over Tokyo to find some targets already burning and attacks its targets as planned. Antiaircraft fire bursts harmlessly around them, and confused enemy fighters ignore them. Ruptured Duck continues toward China and runs low on fuel, approaching the coast in darkness and heavy rain. Lawson attempts a belly landing on the beach and crashes in the surf. With the exception of Thatcher, the entire crew is badly injured; Lawson's left leg is laid open to the bone, and McClure's shoulders are broken. Friendly Chinese soldiers help them, and the Americans face hardships and danger while being escorted through Japanese-held territory. In the absence of medical supplies, the injured men endure terrible pain, and Lawson's leg becomes infected. Delirious, he dreams of Ellen.

A Red Cross banner hangs in the village of Xing Ming, where Doctor Chung offers to take them to his father's hospital, 19 miles farther. He informs the men the Japanese have captured one of the other crews, and they hurry into the hills just before Japanese search parties arrive to burn the village down. No surgeon is at the elder Dr. Chung's hospital, but Lieutenant Smith's crew is on its way with Lieutenant "Doc" White, who volunteered as gunner. The Japanese approach, and the able-bodied Americans leave, except for Doc. He amputates Lawson's leg well above the knee, using the single dose of spinal anesthesia in their possession. It wears off too soon. Lawson passes out and dreams of Ellen.

A chorus of Scouts singing "The Star-Spangled Banner", in Mandarin, celebrates Lawson's first day out of bed. When the elder Dr. Chung gives Lawson an heirloom bracelet for his wife, Lawson is puzzled. He does not remember talking about her. When he totters on his crutches, he becomes distraught at the idea of Ellen seeing him without a leg. They hurry to Ch'ang Chou to meet with an American plane that takes them home.

General Doolittle visits Lawson in the hospital and tells him he has work for him to do. Lawson does not want to see Ellen until he obtains a prosthetic leg and learns to walk properly. Ellen arrives unannounced. Lawson forgets his missing leg and stands; he falls and Ellen rushes to him and the two embrace on the floor.

== Cast ==
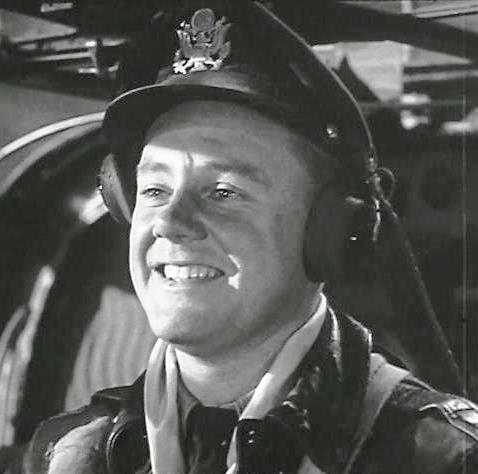
Van Johnson

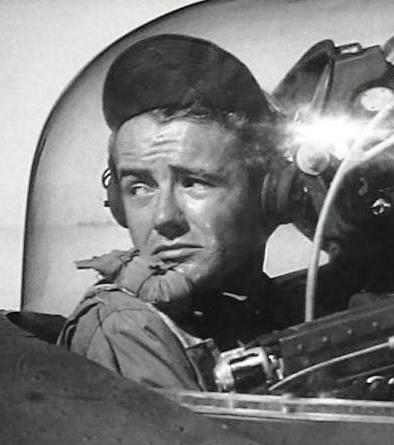
Robert Walker

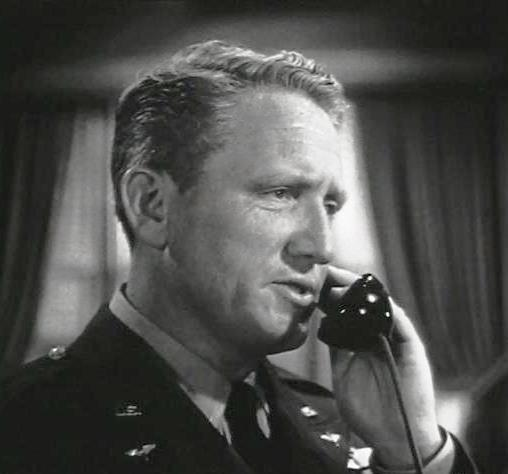
Spencer Tracy

- Van Johnson as Captain Ted W. Lawson, pilot of the Ruptured Duck
- Robert Walker as Corporal David Thatcher, gunner-mechanic
- Tim Murdock as Lt. Dean Davenport, co-pilot
- Don DeFore as Lt. Charles McClure, navigator
- Gordon McDonald as Lt. Bob Clever, bombardier
- Phyllis Thaxter as Ellen Lawson
- Stephen McNally as Lt. Thomas "Doc" White, gunner on Lt. Smith's plane
- Spencer Tracy as Lieutenant Colonel/ Brigadier General Jimmy Doolittle
- John R. Reilly as Lt. Jacob "Shorty" Manch
- Robert Mitchum as Lt. Bob Gray
- Scott McKay as Captain David M. "Davey" Jones
- Donald Curtis as Lt. Randall
- Louis Jean Heydt as Navy Lieutenant Henry Miller
- William "Bill" Phillips as Lt. Don Smith
- Douglas Cowan as Lt. Everett "Brick" Holstrom
- Paul Langton as Captain "Ski" York
- Leon Ames as Lt. Jurika
- Bill Williams as Bud Felton
- Robert Bice as "Jig" White
- Hsin Kung as Dr. Chung
- Benson Fong as Young Dr. Chung
- Ching Wah Lee as Guerilla Charlie
- Alan Napier as Mr. Parker
- Ann Shoemaker as Mrs. Parker
- Dorothy Morris as Jane
- Jacqueline White as Emmy York
- Selena Royle as Mrs. Reynolds
- John Dehner as Lieutenant Commander (uncredited)
- Blake Edwards as Lt. Smith's crewman (uncredited)

Cast notes

- Phyllis Thaxter, Tim Murdock, Steve Brodie, and Robert Mitchum made their screen debuts in this film.

== Production ==
An error in the onscreen credits is perpetuated in many sources, including the Variety review. They list Ted W. Lawson and Robert Considine as authors of both "the book" and a "story" in Collier's magazine. Lawson was author of the book Thirty Seconds Over Tokyo, although Robert Considine is given the credit "edited by". An extract of the story was in Collier's in May–June 1943. The word "Collier's" was crossed off in the film credits of the copyright, cutting continuity.

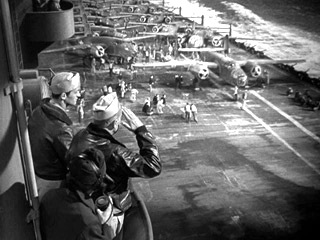
The B-25s are about to launch from USS Hornet. Admiral Halsey (Morris Ankrum) is saluting in the foreground.

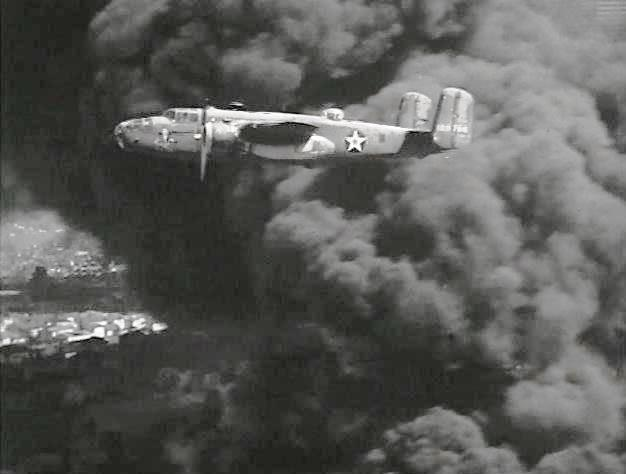
The Ruptured Duck flies over a burning target in Thirty Seconds over Tokyo.

The film is known for its accurate depiction of the raid and use of actual wartime footage of the bombing aircraft. The production crew worked closely with Captain Ted Lawson and other members of the raid to make the film as realistic as possible. Filming at Hurlburt Field and Peel Field near Mary Esther, Florida, and Eglin Field (the actual base where the Doolittle Raiders trained), and operational USAAF B-25C and B-25D bombers were used (closely resembling the B-25B Mitchells used in 1942). Auxiliary Field 4, Peel Field, was used for the short-distance, take-off practice scenes.

Dean Davenport was a technical adviser and stunt flyer for the film. He flew a B-25 bomber off a pier in Santa Monica, California, for a scene showing the take-offs from the Hornet.

Although an aircraft carrier was not available, due to wartime needs (USS Hornet herself had been sunk in the Battle of the Santa Cruz Islands on October 27, 1942, only six months after launching the raid), a mix of realistic studio sets and original newsreel footage recreated the USS Hornet scenes. Principal photography took place from February to June 1944. (Note: MGM's studio 15 provided room for 179 feet (55 m) of carrier deck. Three actual B-25s were used on the set and the remainder were matte paintings of the deck and B-25s integrated into the background.)

MGM informed the War Department that they aimed to dispel rumors that the Army and Navy were not effectively collaborating during the war, as well as generating support for China by depicting the aid provided for the downed Americans from the Chinese Army and peasants. However, the studio did not mention that the Chinese helping the downed flyers were Communist guerillas. Approval was given to the production by the department, but who emphasized that the film needed to focus on all soldiers depicted in the film, stating: "It is hoped that this picture will result not in the glorification of one officer, but of the heroic exploits of the Army Air Force as a whole in relation to the 'Tokyo Raid'....As Captain Lawson was one of a great number of men on this particular mission, it is expected that this picture will result in giving equal credit to all....Damaging repercussions might result if the film emphasizes the part the Chinese play as a nation in assisting the flyers out of enemy-occupied territory. This angle should be reduced to a minimum..."

The film was shot in chronological order, beginning with the training in Florida near Eglin Air Force Base and succeeded by interior shooting in Hollywood and exterior shooting at Alameda. LeRoy directed the bombers in flight through a radio-equipped jeep, allowing for communication with the ground camera and camera plane. Plans had been made to construct an aircraft carrier for the film on a Malibu beach, but these were discarded due to interference from seagulls. As an alternative, art director Paul Groesse designed an interior flat-top set that could carry three real B-25 bombers. A scene in which Japanese soldiers boarded the aircraft carrier Hornet was filmed, but was not included in the final cut. A number of Air Force pilots were requested for some of the flying sequences, according to records from the War Department, but whether the officers appeared in the final cut is unclear.

== Reception ==
The film received favorable reviews. Look praised it as one of the five best films of the year, and the National Board of Review ranked it as eighth-best film of the year. The Hollywood Reporter reviewer called it "one of the greatest war pictures ever made". Film critic and author James Agee wrote in 1944, "30 Seconds Over Tokyo is in some respects the pleasantest of current surprises: a big-studio film, free of artistic pretension, it is transformed by its not very imaginative but very dogged sincerity into something forceful, simple, and thoroughly sympathetic in spite of all its big-studio, big-scale habits ... The Chinese, nearly all of them amateur, are the best thing in the picture and the best Chinese in any American picture: I can only hope they make a great many people in Hollywood aware of the tremendous advantages of using non-actors in films ..."

Thirty Seconds Over Tokyo was recognized as an inspirational, patriotic film with great value as a morale builder for wartime audiences. The New York Times in 1944 summed the production, "our first sensational raid on Japan in April 1942 is told with magnificent integrity and dramatic eloquence." Variety focused on the human elements, "inspired casting ... the war becomes a highly personalized thing through the actions of these crew members...this pleasant little family."

Later reviewers have considered Thirty Seconds Over Tokyo the finest aviation film of the period. The film is now considered a "classic aviation and war film." The actual Raiders considered it a worthy tribute.

On the review aggregator website Rotten Tomatoes, 100% of 5 critics' reviews are positive, with an average rating of 7.3/10. Metacritic, which uses a weighted average, assigned the film a score of 77 out of 100, based on eight critics, indicating "generally favorable" reviews.

=== Box office ===
According to MGM records, the film made $4,297,000 in the US and Canada and $1,950,000 elsewhere, resulting in a profit of $1,382,000.

=== Awards and honors ===
In the Academy Awards, the Thirty Seconds Over Tokyo team of A. Arnold Gillespie, Donald Jahraus, and Warren Newcombe (photography), and Douglas Shearer (sound) won the Oscar for Best Special Effects. Robert Surtees, A.S.C. and Harold Rosson, A.S.C. were nominated in the category of Black and White Cinematography.

== In popular culture ==
- Thirty Seconds Over Tokyo star Van Johnson appeared in a 1970 commercial for Post Fortified Oat Flakes breakfast cereal on a set evoking an aircraft carrier flight deck with B-25s on board. He ended with the line that the cereal would "take me to Tokyo – and back!"
- Jefferson Airplane's second live album, Thirty Seconds Over Winterland (1973), and experimental rock band Pere Ubu's 1975 debut single, "30 Seconds Over Tokyo", are named after the film.
- The opening scene of the film Midway (1976) uses footage from Thirty Seconds Over Tokyo to launch the film's plot with the Doolittle Raid.
- The title of "Thirty Minutes over Tokyo", an episode of The Simpsons, is a reference to Thirty Seconds Over Tokyo.
- Part II of War And Remembrance uses the same footage as Midway.
