= Bob Considine =

American journalist (1906–1975)

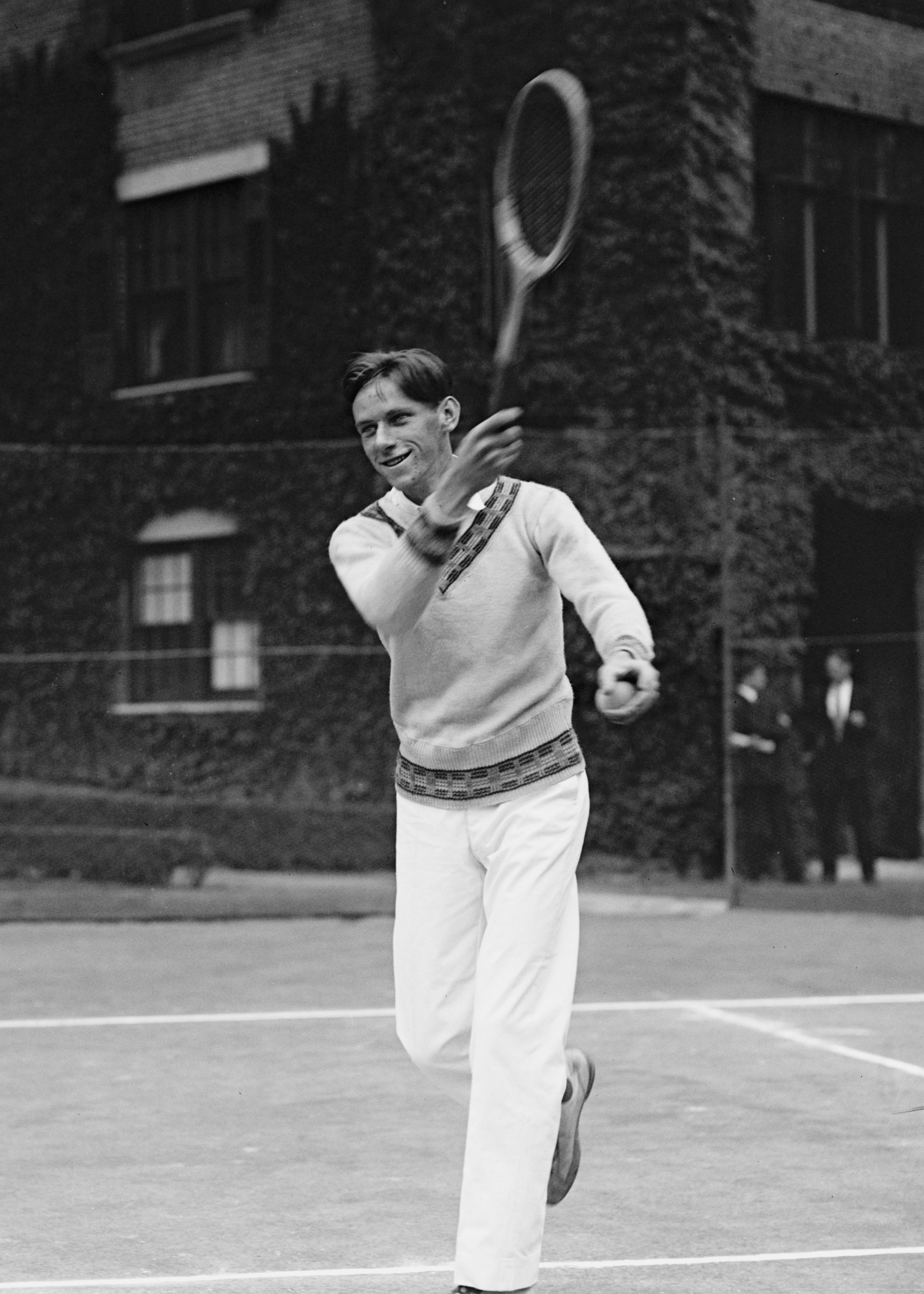
- Considine in 1927
- Born: November 4, 1906; Washington, D.C.
- Died: September 25, 1975 (aged 68); Manhattan, New York City
- Resting place: Gate of Heaven Cemetery in Hawthorne, New York
- Education: Gonzaga College High School; George Washington University
- Occupations: Journalist and author
- Years active: 1930–1975

Robert Bernard Considine (November 4, 1906 – September 25, 1975), was an American journalist, author, and commentator. He is best known as the co-author of Thirty Seconds Over Tokyo and The Babe Ruth Story.

== Biography ==
As a student, Considine attended Gonzaga College High School and George Washington University, both in his hometown of Washington, D.C., where he also worked for the government.

He launched his journalism career on his own initiative. In 1930, he purportedly complained to the editors of the now defunct Washington Herald when they misspelled his name in a report about an amateur tennis tournament in which he had participated. He was hired as the newspaper's tennis reporter. He later wrote drama reviews and Sunday feature articles. The newspaper was part of a syndicate of major-market daily newspapers owned by media magnate William Randolph Hearst. Considine could and would use this fact to his advantage.

With the advent of World War II, Considine became a war correspondent with the International News Service, also owned by Hearst. The wire service was a predecessor to United Press International. and, his column "On the Line" was a popular syndicated feature.

"Bob Considine is no great writer, but he is the Hearstling who regularly gets there first with the most words on almost any subject", wrote Time magazine in an unsigned profile.

With Ted W. Lawson, Considine authored Thirty Seconds over Tokyo, an account of Lt. Col. James Doolittle's 1942 air raid on Japan that was released the following year. It became a best-selling book.

Considine was prolific, with output that few could match. "Considine's speed, accuracy, and concentration as a writer and his seemingly inexhaustible energy were legendary in the newspaper profession. He was known to work at two typewriters at one time, writing a news story on one and a column or book on the other. His colleagues at the Washington Post recalled that he wrote a column on the 1942 World Series in nine minutes--on a train with his typewriter on a baggage car and the conductor shouting, 'All aboard'", according to the Dictionary of American Biography.

In 1955, Considine was a permanent panelist on the television game show Who Said That?, hosted on American Broadcasting Company by John Charles Daly, where celebrities attempted to identify the speaker of a quotation from recent news.

Considine was not without his detractors. He was often taken to task for biased reporting, such as a 1946 article about then U.S. President Harry S. Truman. Simply working for Hearst was enough for others. "I was talking to Harry Bridges about a miserable anti-union article by a Hearst columnist named Bob Considine", remembered journalist Sidney Roger in a series of interviews. "He was a quintessential Hearstling. Very anti-union and very pro-war. I was describing what Considine wrote in his column. Harry said, 'I saw it, but you know, after all he works for Hearst and he's loyal to Hearst and Hearst's ideas.'"

A profile of the writer appearing in Time bore the headline "Ghost at Work", alluding to the numerous works to which he contributed in a behind-the-scenes role. "Ghostwriter Considine dashes off his fast-moving autobiographies while their heroes still rate Page One, takes one-third of the 'author's' royalties as his cut. His General Wainwright's Story was in print before Wainwright was out of the hospital. While Ted Lawson was still recovering from wounds suffered in Doolittle's Tokyo raid, Considine finished Thirty Seconds Over Tokyo." He made an estimated $100,000 annually.

He continued to work for Hearst while writing his books and adapting some of them into screenplays. He was undaunted by the pace of his schedule. "Last year [1948] I spent time in Palm Springs, Paris, and Mexico City. I covered the Kentucky Derby and talked to the Pope. I even saw the World Series. It's a pretty good job", he told Time.

With the creation of United Press International in 1958, Considine remained on the Hearst payroll, but his work was syndicated through the wire service.

Around 1960, a children's parody of the Howdy Doody show theme song went "It's Howdy Doody time, the show's not worth a dime, so turn on channel nine, and watch Bob Considine."

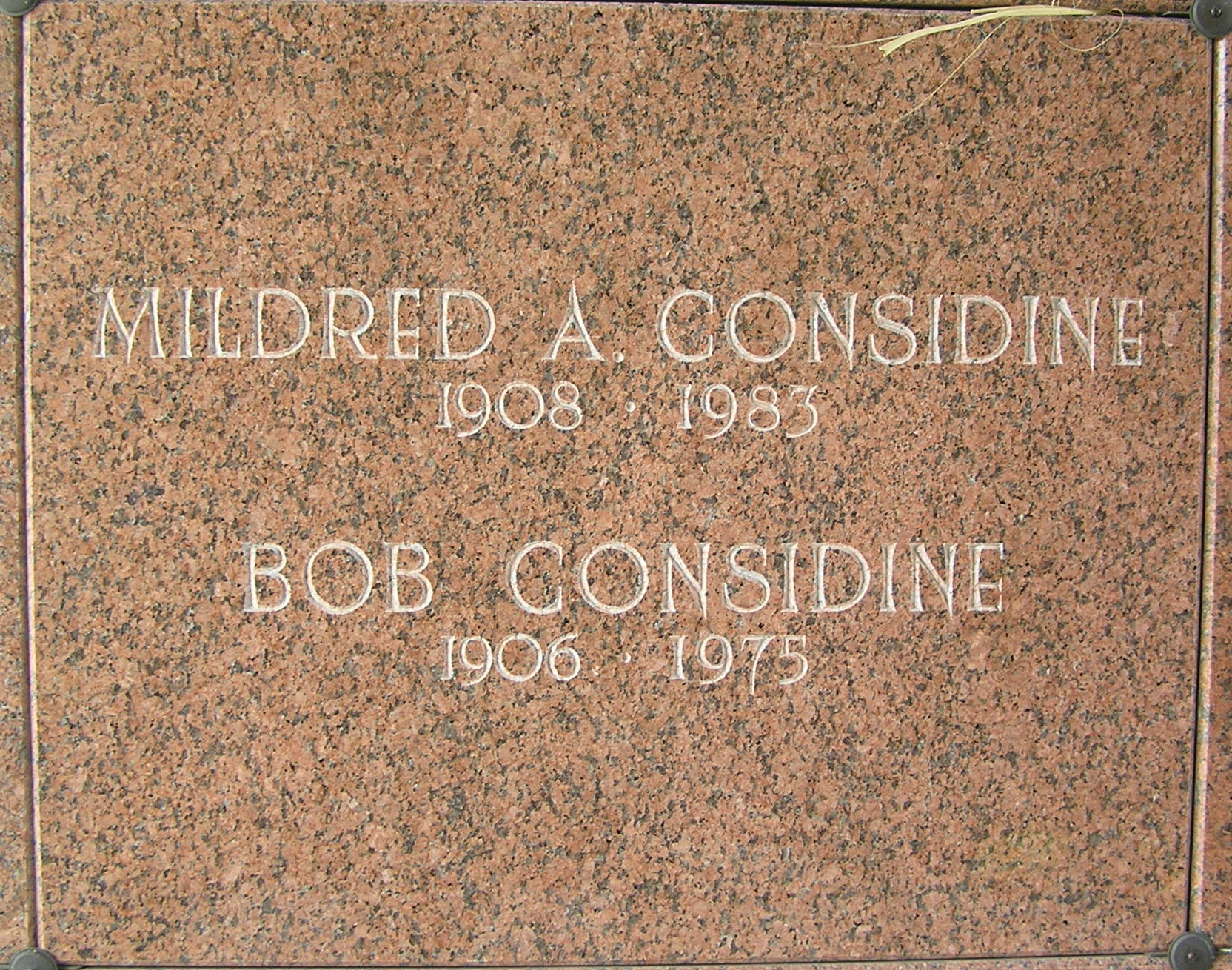
The crypt of Bob Considine

Considine had an array of influential admirers. He had correspondence from Truman, Lyndon B. Johnson, Rube Goldberg, Nelson A. Rockefeller, Cardinal Francis Spellman, and General William C. Westmoreland. President Dwight D. Eisenhower in a 1960 letter to William Randolph Hearst Jr., praised Considine's reporting on the 1960 U-2 incident in which the Soviets downed an American aircraft piloted by Francis Gary Powers and used for intelligence gathering. The controversy sank the American-Soviet summit which was about to convene in Paris. "Writing this note gives me also an opportunity to express my satisfaction over the balanced and reasonable way the Hearst papers handled the recent U-2 incident and the 'Summit' meeting. I thought that some of the pieces by Bob Considine were excellent, and of course from my viewpoint they were highly complimentary. I never forget the old saw -- 'He is a great man; he agrees with me.'"

Considine's "On The Line With Considine" commentaries were heard at different periods on the ABC Radio Network, and on NBC Monitor. New York's WNBC-TV broadcast a television version of the program in 1951. It was then picked up by the full NBC television network and ran on Tuesday nights until January 1954 (followed by a 1954 summer run on Sunday nights on the ABC network).

In his final column in 1975, Considine reportedly wrote: "I'll croak in the newspaper business. Is there any better way to go?" He died in the Manhattan borough of New York City that same year following a stroke. Bob Considine is interred in a crypt at Gate of Heaven Cemetery in Hawthorne, New York.

His papers are held by the Special Collections Research Center at Syracuse University (see "External links" below).

== Awards ==
- 1957 Overseas Press Club
- 1959 Overseas Press Club

== Selected works ==
- MacArthur the Magnificent, 1942
- Thirty Seconds over Tokyo, 1943
- The Babe Ruth Story, written with Babe Ruth, 1948
- The Red Plot against America, with Robert E. Stripling. 1949
- Innocents at Home, 1950
- The Maryknoll Story, 1950
- The Panama Canal, 1951
- It's the Irish, 1961
- The Men Who Robbed Brink's, 1961
- Ripley, The Modern Marco Polo: The Life and Times of the Creator of Ripley's Believe It or Not!, 1961
- General Douglas MacArthur, Greenwich, Conn.: Fawcett Gold Medal Books, 1964
- It's All News to Me, 1967
- Toots, 1969
- The Remarkable Life of Armand Hammer, 1975
