= Robert Surtees (cinematographer) =

American cinematographer (1906–1985)

- Born: Robert Lee Surtees; August 9, 1906; Covington, Kentucky, U.S.
- Died: January 5, 1985 (aged 78); Monterey, California, U.S.
- Occupation: Cinematographer
- Years active: 1931–1978
- Spouse: Maydell Lois James (m. 1930)
- Children: 4, including Bruce Surtees
- Awards: See below

Robert Lee Surtees, A.S.C. (August 9, 1906 – January 5, 1985) was an American cinematographer. He worked at various studios, including Universal, UFA, Warner Brothers, and MGM, lighting for notable directors Howard Hawks, Mike Nichols, and William Wyler, gaining him a reputation as one of the most versatile cinematographers of his time. He won three Academy Awards, out of 16 total nominations, for the films King Solomon's Mines (1950), The Bad and the Beautiful (1952), and Ben-Hur (1959).

== Early life and education ==
Robert Lee Surtees was born in Covington, Kentucky, on August 9, 1906. He grew up in Ohio, graduating from Withrow High School in Cincinnati, where he initially worked as a photographer and retoucher at a portrait studio. Surtees then moved to New York City for a year to study photography, but always had a goal of becoming a cinematographer.

== Career ==
With an intention to attend college, Surtees moved to California in 1925. Roy C. Hunter at Universal offered him a job after some of his work was published in Towing Topics Automotive Club magazine. He assisted Harry Neumann, ASC, on a Hoot Gibson Western Hey, Hey Cowboy in 1925, Jerry Ash, ASC, on the Andy Gump comedies also in 1925, and Jackson Rose, ASC, on the Reginald Denny Leather Pushers series in 1926. The Man Who Laughs (1928), photographed by Gil Warrenton, ASC was Surtees' first high budget picture as an assistant.

From 1928 to 1929 Surtees worked for Universal and UFA as an assistant to Charles Stumar in France, Germany, Switzerland, and Italy. Some sources say that he assisted Gregg Toland and Joseph Ruttenburg in the latter years of the 1920s before going abroad and this is what kick-started his career. In 1930 Surtees returned to California and assisted Hal Mohr, ASC, on King of Jazz. He went on to shoot 36 pictures with Mohr at Universal, Warner Brothers, Pathé and Fox Studios over a period of 6 years from 1930 to 1936. In 1935, Surtees applied to be a member of the ASC as a camera operator just after completing 13 weeks as an operator at Warner Brother's Studios on the film A Midsummer Night's Dream (1935).

Surtees' first film as a director of photography was This Precious Freedom (1942), a propaganda film made for the US army, which was only released to the military.

He shot a few more pictures with various directors such as Frank Buck and Ed Sutherland on Jacquerai in September 1942, and Les Goodwins on Ice Capades in October 1942. On October 20, 1942, Surtees submitted another application to ASC as a director of photography while employed at Freelance Independent Producers.

Shortly after this Surtees landed a job at MGM where he began his long tenure and produced his most notable work beginning with Thirty Seconds Over Tokyo, shot alongside Harold Rosson, ASC and nominated for an Oscar in the category of Black and White Cinematography in 1944. Robert Surtees went on to film nearly 100 motion pictures in his 48-year career, including King Solomon's Mines (1950), The Bad and the Beautiful (1952), and Ben Hur (1959), which each won an Oscar. Not to mention his 13 other films that also received nomination for Best Cinematography, including The Graduate (1967), The Last Picture Show (1971), and The Sting (1973).

== Legacy ==
Surtees was a sought-after cinematographer because of his versatility -— "I have liked doing all kinds of pictures—musical, comedies, and action-adventure". He also gained a reputation for being a stickler for precise color control and proper exposure of the negative, arranging his lighting and camera angles so he could provide the lab with the best negative he could make.

Surtees enjoyed experimenting with lighting, and always found ways to properly light a scene, even without all the necessary equipment; for instance, on King Solomon's Mines (1950), when generators could not be transported throughout the dense African jungle, Surtees lit the whole film with reflectors.

He also played a role with regards to technological innovations, being one of the first to use a telephoto lens (500mm) in The Graduate (1967).

== Personal life ==
Robert Surtees married Maydell Lois James in 1930 before moving to California. The couple had two daughters (Linda, later Linda Lowers, and Nancy, later Nancy Corby), as well as two sons (Thomas and Bruce). Bruce was also a director of photography, working alongside his father on Lost Horizon (1973), as a 2nd unit camera operator.

=== Death ===
Surtees died on January 5, 1985, following a long illness.

== Filmography ==
- Heavenly Music (short) (1943)
- Thirty Seconds Over Tokyo (1944)
- A Date with Judy (1948)
- Act of Violence (1949)
- King Solomon's Mines (1950)
- Quo Vadis (1951)
- The Wild North (1952)
- Scaramouche (1952)
- The Merry Widow (1952)
- The Bad and the Beautiful (1952)
- Ride, Vaquero! (1953)
- Mogambo (1953)
- Escape from Fort Bravo (1953)
- Valley of the Kings (1954)
- The Long, Long Trailer (1954)
- Trial (1955)
- Oklahoma! (1955)
- Tribute to a Bad Man (1956)
- The Swan (1956)
- Raintree County (1957)
- Les Girls (1957)
- Merry Andrew (1958)
- The Law and Jake Wade (1958)
- Ben-Hur (1959)
- It Started in Naples (1960)
- Cimarron (1960)
- Mutiny on the Bounty (1962)
- Pt 109 (1963)
- Kisses for My President (1964)
- The Third Day (1965)
- The Satan Bug (1965)
- The Hallelujah Trail (1965)
- The Collector (1965)
- Lost Command (1966)
- The Chase (1966)
- The Graduate (1967)
- Doctor Dolittle (1967)
- Sweet Charity (1969)
- The Arrangement (1969)
- The Liberation of L.B. Jones (1970)
- Summer of '42 (1971)
- The Last Picture Show (1971)
- The Other (1972)
- The Cowboys (1972)
- The Sting (1973)
- Oklahoma Crude (1973)
- Lost Horizon (1973)
- The Hindenburg (1975)
- The Great Waldo Pepper (1975)
- A Star Is Born (1976)
- The Turning Point (1977)
- Same Time, Next Year (1978)
- Bloodbrothers (1978)

== Awards and nominations ==
Institution	Year	Category	Work	Result	Ref.
Academy Awards	1945	Best Cinematography, Black-and-White	Thirty Seconds Over Tokyo	Nominated	
Academy Awards	1951	Best Cinematography, Color	King Solomon's Mines	Won	
Academy Awards	1952	Best Cinematography, Color	Quo Vadis	Nominated	
Academy Awards	1953	Best Cinematography, Color	The Bad and the Beautiful	Won	
Academy Awards	1956	Best Cinematography, Color	Oklahoma!	Nominated	
Academy Awards	1960	Best Cinematography, Color	Ben-Hur	Won	
Academy Awards	1963	Best Cinematography, Color	Mutiny on the Bounty	Nominated	
Academy Awards	1968	Best Cinematography	Doctor Dolittle	Nominated	
Academy Awards	1968	Best Cinematography	The Graduate	Nominated	
Academy Awards	1972	Best Cinematography	Summer of '42	Nominated	
Academy Awards	1972	Best Cinematography	The Last Picture Show	Nominated	
Academy Awards	1974	Best Cinematography	The Sting	Nominated	
Academy Awards	1976	Best Cinematography	The Hindenburg	Nominated	
Academy Awards	1977	Best Cinematography	A Star Is Born	Nominated	
Academy Awards	1978	Best Cinematography	The Turning Point	Nominated	
Academy Awards	1979	Best Cinematography	Same Time, Next Year	Nominated	
Golden Globe Awards	1951	Best Cinematography - Color	King Solomon's Mines	Won	
Locarno Film Festival	1948	Best Cinematography - Color	The Unfinished Dance	Won	
National Society of Film Critics	1972	Best Cinematography	The Last Picture Show	Nominated	
National Society of Film Critics	1972	Best Cinematography	Summer of '42	Nominated	
