= Bunny Allen =

Frank Maurice Allen (17 April 1906, in Upton Cum Chalvey, Buckinghamshire, England – 14 January 2002, in Lamu Island), known as "Bunny Allen", was a renowned white hunter and safari guide in Kenya.

== Biography ==
Allen earned the nickname "Bunny" from a Gypsy hunting companion in England for his proficiency in snaring rabbits in Windsor Forest. He was educated at Sir William Borlase's Grammar School, Marlow, Buckinghamshire.

He arrived in Kenya in 1927 to join his two brothers. He found work managing a farm for Mervyn Soames where he took guests out shooting. His bush expertise drew respect from the locals and he became a hunting partner of Denys Finch Hatton. He took part in three Royal Safaris including one where he captured cheetah by driving alongside them as they ran and jumping on their backs.

During World War II he enlisted and was later commissioned in the King's African Rifles, serving in the Battle of Madagascar and the 6th East African Campaign and finishing the war as a Captain.

He was the subject of a short film directed by Peter Hort and Mark Macauley in 1996 called A Gypsy in Africa.

== Film work ==
Allen returned to hunting in 1946 and through his famous clients on safaris was discovered by Hollywood where he acted as a technical adviser to MGM's King Solomon's Mines as well as The African Queen, Where No Vultures Fly and Nor the Moon by Night. He gained fame by working on John Ford's Mogambo and acted as Clark Gable's double during action scenes. See also White Hunter Black Heart.

== Books ==
- Allen, Bunny & Claassens, Harry The Wheel Of Life: A Life Of Safaris And Romance Safari Press, 2005 He also wrote First Wheel and Second Wheel, both published by Amwell Press in New Jersey. They were signed, numbered slipcased limited editions of 1,000 copies each.

== See also ==
- List of famous big game hunters
- A Gypsy in Africa
