= Van Johnson =

American actor (1916–2008)

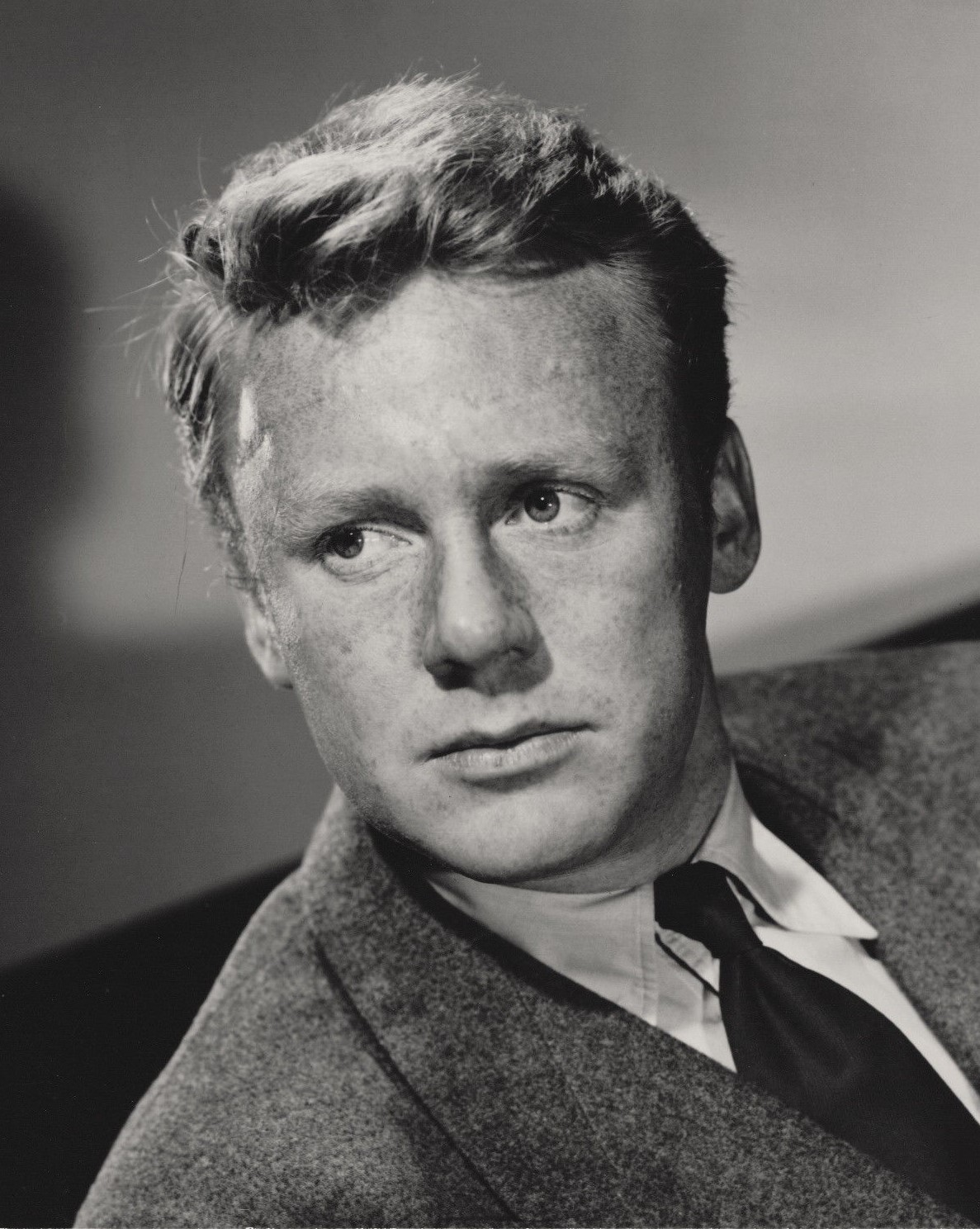
- Johnson in 1947
- Born: Charles Van Dell Johnson; August 25, 1916; Newport, Rhode Island, U.S.
- Died: December 12, 2008 (aged 92); Nyack, New York, U.S.
- Occupations: Actor, singer, dancer
- Years active: 1935–1992
- Spouse: Eve Lynn Abbott Wynn (m. 1947; div. 1968)
- Children: 1
- Relatives: Tracy Keenan Wynn (stepson); Ned Wynn (stepson)

Charles Van Dell Johnson (August 25, 1916 – December 12, 2008) was an American actor, singer, and dancer. He had a prolific career in film, television, theatre and radio, which spanned over 50 years, from 1940 to 1992. He was a major star at Metro-Goldwyn-Mayer during and after World War II, known for his upbeat and "all-American" screen persona, often playing young military servicemen, or in musicals.

Originally a Broadway dancer, Johnson achieved his breakthrough playing a rookie bomber pilot in A Guy Named Joe (1943). Throughout the war years, he became a popular Hollywood star, as the embodiment of the "boy-next-door wholesomeness" playing "the red-haired, freckle-faced soldier, sailor, or bomber pilot who used to live down the street" in such films as The Human Comedy (also 1943) and Thirty Seconds Over Tokyo (1944). After World War II, he continued to play similar heartthrob and military characters, equal parts in serious dramas like The Caine Mutiny (1954), and in light musicals like Brigadoon (1954).

After the end of his contract with MGM, he transitioned largely into television, though he continued to make regular film appearances in featured and supporting parts, earning an Emmy Award nomination for his performance in the miniseries Rich Man, Poor Man. He continued to maintain a regular presence in musical theatre, most notably as Professor Harold Hill The Music Man on the West End, and Georges in La Cage aux Folles on Broadway, before retiring from acting in the early 1990s. At the time of his death in 2008, he was one of the last surviving matinee idols of the Golden Age of Hollywood.

== Early life ==
Johnson was born in Newport, Rhode Island on August 25, 1916, the only child of Loretta (née Snyder) and Charles E. Johnson, a plumber and later a real-estate salesman. His father was born in Sweden and came to the United States as a child, and his mother had Pennsylvania Dutch ancestry. His mother was allegedly an alcoholic who left the family when he was a child, and he was not close to his father.

== Career ==
Van Johnson's hand prints in front of The Great Movie Ride at Walt Disney World's Disney's Hollywood Studios theme park

Johnson performed at social clubs in Newport while in high school. He moved to New York City after graduation in 1935 and joined the off-Broadway revue Entre Nous.

=== Broadway ===
Johnson toured New England in a theater troupe as a substitute dancer, but his acting career began in earnest in the Broadway revue New Faces of 1936. He returned to the chorus after that and worked in summer resorts near New York City. In 1939, director and playwright George Abbott cast him in Rodgers and Hart's Too Many Girls in the role of a college boy and as understudy for all three male leads. He had an uncredited role in the film adaptation of Too Many Girls, which costarred Lucille Ball and Desi Arnaz, then Abbott hired him as a chorus boy and Gene Kelly's understudy in Pal Joey.

=== Warner Bros. ===
Johnson was about to move back to New York when Lucille Ball took him to Chasen's Restaurant, where she introduced him to MGM casting director Billy Grady who was sitting at the next table. This led to screen tests by Hollywood studios. His test at Columbia Pictures was unsuccessful, but Warner Brothers put him on contract at $300 a week. He was cast as a cub reporter opposite Faye Emerson in the 1942 film Murder in the Big House. His eyebrows and hair were dyed black for the role. Johnson's all-American good looks and easy demeanor were ill-suited to the gritty movies that Warner made at the time, and the studio dropped him at the expiration of his six-month contract.

=== MGM ===
Johnson was soon signed by Metro-Goldwyn-Mayer. The studio provided him with classes in acting, speech, and diction. He then had an uncredited part as a soldier in Somewhere I'll Find You (1942). He attracted attention in a small part in The War Against Mrs. Hadley (1942), and this encouraged MGM to cast him in their long-running series Dr. Kildare. These films had starred Lew Ayres as Dr. Kildare and Lionel Barrymore as Dr. Gillespie; Ayres' career was hurt due to being a conscientious objector, so the series focused on Dr. Gillespie mentoring new doctors. Johnson played Dr. Randall Adams in Dr. Gillespie's New Assistant (1942).

MGM then cast Johnson as Mickey Rooney's soldier brother in The Human Comedy (1943), a huge hit. He returned as Randall Adams in Dr. Gillespie's Criminal Case (1943) and was in uniform again for Pilot No. 5 (1943). He had a small role as a reporter in Madame Curie (1943).

=== A Guy Named Joe and stardom ===
Johnson's big break was in A Guy Named Joe starring Spencer Tracy and Irene Dunne, in which he played a young pilot, who acquires a deceased pilot as his guardian angel. During the film's production in 1943, Johnson was involved in a serious car accident that left him with a metal plate in his forehead and a number of scars on his face that plastic surgery could not completely correct or conceal. He recovered at the home of Keenan Wynn before returning to acting. He wore heavy makeup to hide the scars for the rest of his career. MGM wanted to replace him in A Guy Named Joe, but Tracy insisted that he be allowed to finish the picture, despite his long absence. The film was a great hit, earning a profit of over one million dollars and launching Johnson as a star.

Johnson's injuries from the car accident exempted him from service in World War II. Many other actors were serving in the armed forces, so the accident greatly benefited Johnson's career. He later said, "There were five of us. There was Jimmy Craig, Bob Young, Bobby Walker, Peter Lawford, and myself. All tested for the same part all the time." Johnson was very busy, often playing soldiers; he joked of this period, "I remember... finishing one Thursday morning with June Allyson and starting a new one Thursday afternoon with Esther Williams. I didn't know which branch of the service I was in!"

MGM built up Johnson's image as the all-American boy in war dramas and musicals. His first top-billed role in an "A" picture was the musical Two Girls and a Sailor (1944) which was a big success; it was his first film with June Allyson. He had a smaller part in The White Cliffs of Dover (1944), then reprised his role as Dr. Adams in 3 Men in White (1944).

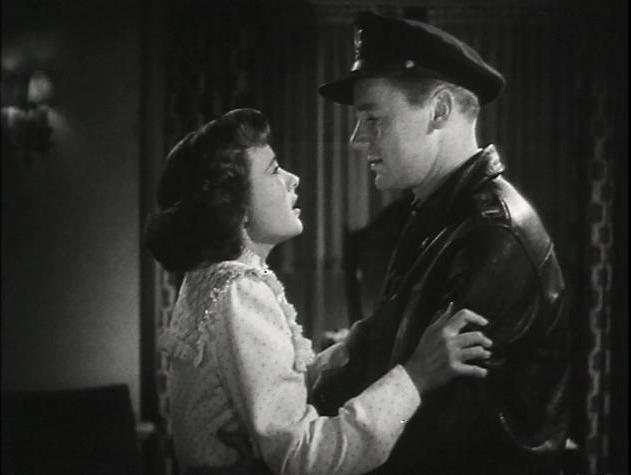
Photo of Phyllis Thaxter and Van Johnson from the film, Thirty Seconds Over Tokyo 1944

=== Post-war career peak ===
Johnson played Ted Lawson in Thirty Seconds Over Tokyo (1944) which told the story of the Doolittle Raid on Tokyo in April 1942. He played Dr. Adams one last time in Between Two Women (1945). He starred in Thrill of a Romance (1945), a musical with Esther Williams, and Week-End at the Waldorf (1945), a musical remake of Grand Hotel with Lana Turner, Walter Pidgeon, and Ginger Rogers. In 1945, he tied with Bing Crosby as the top box office stars.

He was reunited with Williams in Easy to Wed (1946), a musical remake of Libeled Lady. He supported Spencer Tracy and Katharine Hepburn in State of the Union (1948), and he supported Clark Gable and Pidgeon in the war drama Command Decision (1948).

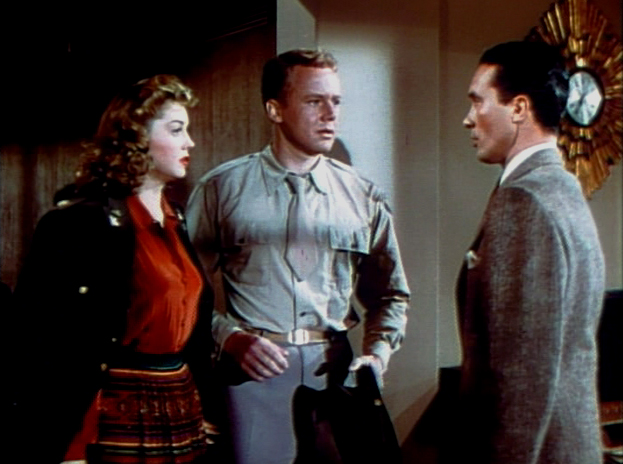
Johnson with Carleton G. Young and Esther Williams in Thrill of a Romance (1945).

=== MGM under Dore Schary ===
20th Century Fox borrowed Johnson to make the comedy Mother Is a Freshman (1948) with Loretta Young. Back at MGM, he was given a role in the film noir Scene of the Crime (1949). In 1949, he starred with Judy Garland in In the Good Old Summertime, which also marked the first film appearance of Liza Minnelli as Garland's and Johnson's young daughter. He next worked in Battleground (1949), a movie about the Battle of the Bulge produced by MGM's new studio head Dore Schary.

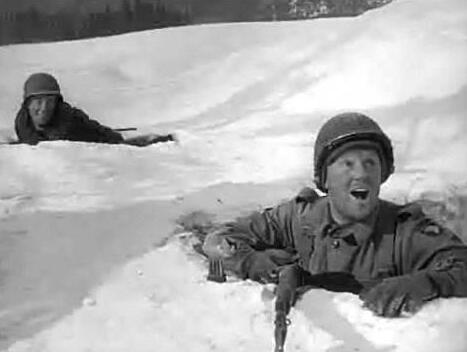
Johnson continued to star in war dramas after the war ended, including Battleground (1949).

Johnson made the comedy The Big Hangover (1950), then was reunited with Williams in Duchess of Idaho (1951). He appeared in the romantic comedy Three Guys Named Mike (1951). He played an officer leading Japanese-American troops of the famed 442nd Regimental Combat Team in Europe in the Schary-produced film Go for Broke! (1951). He had a small part in It's a Big Country (1951) and was reunited with Allyson for Too Young to Kiss (1951). MGM lent him to Columbia for The Caine Mutiny (1954) in the role of Stephen Maryk. He refused to allow concealment of his facial scars when being made up as Maryk, believing that they enhanced the character's authenticity. Herman Wouk describes Maryk as having "ugly but not unpleasant features" in the novel. One commentator noted years later that "Humphrey Bogart and Jose Ferrer chomp up all the scenery in this maritime courtroom drama, but it's Johnson's character, the painfully ambivalent, not-too-bright Lieutenant Steve Maryk, who binds the whole movie together." Time magazine commented that Johnson "was a better actor than Hollywood usually allowed him to be."

Johnson next teamed with Gene Kelly as the sardonic second lead of Brigadoon (1954). He had the lead in The Last Time I Saw Paris (1954), his last film for MGM. He had a five-year contract with Columbia to make one film a year.

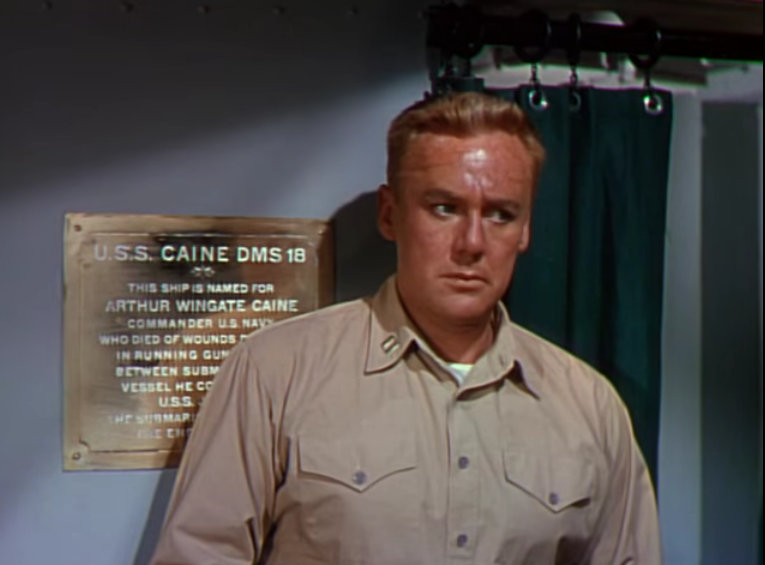
Johnson's critically praised performance in The Caine Mutiny (1954) was his most notable post-MGM role.

Unlike some other stars of that era, Johnson did not resent the restrictions of the studio system. In 1985, he said that his years at MGM were "one big happy family and a little kingdom". "Everything was provided for us, from singing lessons to barbells. All we had to do was inhale, exhale and be charming. I used to dread leaving the studio to go out into the real world, because to me the studio was the real world."

=== Freelancer ===
During the 1950s, Johnson continued to appear in films and also appeared frequently in television guest appearances. He appeared as the celebrity mystery guest on What's My Line? airing on November 22, 1953, but was not questioned by the panel due to advance notice of his appearance. He then appeared again on the May 22, 1955, airing and was guessed by Fred Allen. He was in The End of the Affair (1955) at Columbia then made The Bottom of the Bottle (1956) at Fox. He received favorable critical notices for the 1956 dramatic film Miracle in the Rain, co-starring Jane Wyman, in which he played a good-hearted young soldier preparing to go to war, and in the mystery 23 Paces to Baker Street, in which he played a blind playwright residing in London. He returned to MGM for Slander (1956) and Action of the Tiger (1957).

Johnson appeared as the title character of the highly rated "spectacular," The Pied Piper of Hamelin, a musical version of Robert Browning's poem, set to the music of Edvard Grieg. Featuring Claude Rains in his only singing and dancing role, it aired on November 26, 1957, as part of NBC's week of Thanksgiving specials. The program was so successful it spawned a record album and was repeated in 1958. Syndicated to many local stations, it was rerun annually for many years in the tradition of other holiday specials.

On February 19, 1959, Johnson appeared in the episode "Deadfall" of CBS's Dick Powell's Zane Grey Theatre in the role of Frank Gilette, a former outlaw falsely charged with bank robbery. He is framed by Hugh Perry, a corrupt prosecutor played by Harry Townes, and Deputy Stover, portrayed by Bing Russell. Convicted of the robbery, Gilette is captured by outlaws while on his way to prison, and the sheriff, Roy Lamont, portrayed by Grant Withers, is killed.

In 1959, Johnson turned down an opportunity to star as Eliot Ness in The Untouchables, which went on to become a successful television series with Robert Stack as Ness.

Johnson guest-starred as Joe Robertson, with June Allyson and Don Rickles, in the 1960 episode "The Women Who" of the CBS anthology series The DuPont Show with June Allyson. In 1961 Johnson traveled to England to star in Harold Fielding's production of The Music Man at the Adelphi Theatre in London. The show enjoyed a successful run of almost a year, with Johnson playing the arduous leading role of Harold Hill to great acclaim. In 1968 he was in the successful MGM film Yours, Mine and Ours along with Lucille Ball and Henry Fonda. Johnson also guest-starred on Batman as "The Minstrel" in two episodes (39 and 40) in 1966. From the late 1960s, he appeared in Italian-produced genre films.

In the 1970s, he appeared on Here's Lucy, Quincy, M.E., McMillan & Wife and Love, American Style. He played a lead character in the 1976 miniseries Rich Man, Poor Man, and was nominated for a prime time Emmy Award for that role. In the 1980s, he appeared on an episode of Angela Lansbury's Murder, She Wrote along with June Allyson. He also appeared in a special two-part episode of The Love Boat, "The Musical: My Ex-Mom; The Show Must Go On; The Pest, Parts 1 and 2" which aired on February 27, 1982, and co-starred Ann Miller, Ethel Merman, Della Reese, Carol Channing, and Cab Calloway.

In the 1970s, after twice fighting bouts of cancer, Johnson began a second career in summer stock and dinner theater. In 1985, returning to Broadway for the first time since Pal Joey, he was cast in the starring role of the musical La Cage aux Folles. In that same year he appeared in a supporting role in Woody Allen's The Purple Rose of Cairo. At the age of 75, then grey and rotund, he toured in Show Boat as Captain Andy. His last film appearance was in Three Days to a Kill (1992). In 2003, he appeared with Betsy Palmer for three performances of A. R. Gurney's Love Letters at a theater in Wesley Hills, New York.

== Honors ==
For his contribution to the film industry, Johnson has a star on the Hollywood Walk of Fame at 6600 Hollywood Blvd.

== Personal life ==
Johnson married former stage actress Eve Abbott (1914–2004) on January 25, 1947, the day after her divorce from actor Keenan Wynn was finalized. Their daughter Schuyler was born in 1948. By this marriage, Johnson gained stepsons Edmond (Ned) Keenan and Tracy Keenan Wynn; the latter was a screenwriter. In a statement by Eve, published after her death at age 90, she said MGM had engineered her marriage to Johnson to cover up his alleged homosexuality. "They needed their 'big star' to be married to quell rumors about his sexual preferences and unfortunately, I was 'It' – the only woman he would marry." Commenting on their complicated relationships, Keenan Wynn's father Ed Wynn said, "I can't keep them straight. Evie loved Keenan. Keenan loves Evie. Van loves Evie. Evie loves Van. Van loves Keenan. Keenan loves Van."

Johnson's biographer Ronald L. Davis writes that it "seems to have been well known in the film capital" that Johnson had homosexual tendencies, but this was never reported or hinted at by newspaper columnists or movie magazine writers during the era when Johnson made movies. Studio executive Louis B. Mayer made strenuous efforts to quash any potential scandal regarding Johnson and any of his actor friends whom Mayer suspected of being homosexual. Johnson's marriage to Eve Abbott ended four years after Mayer's death when Johnson, performing as Professor Harold Hill in The Music Man in the West End in London, is alleged to have begun an affair with a male dancer in the production, according to her son Ned Wynn. He claimed that Johnson left her "for a man – a boy, really. He's the lead boy dancer." The couple separated in 1961 and their divorce was finalized in 1968.

In contrast to his "cheery Van" screen image, Eve claimed that he was morose and moody because of his difficult early life. She reported that he had little tolerance for unpleasantness and would stride into his bedroom and seclude himself at the slightest hint of trouble. He had a difficult relationship with his father growing up, and he was estranged from his daughter at the time of his death.

=== Later years and death ===
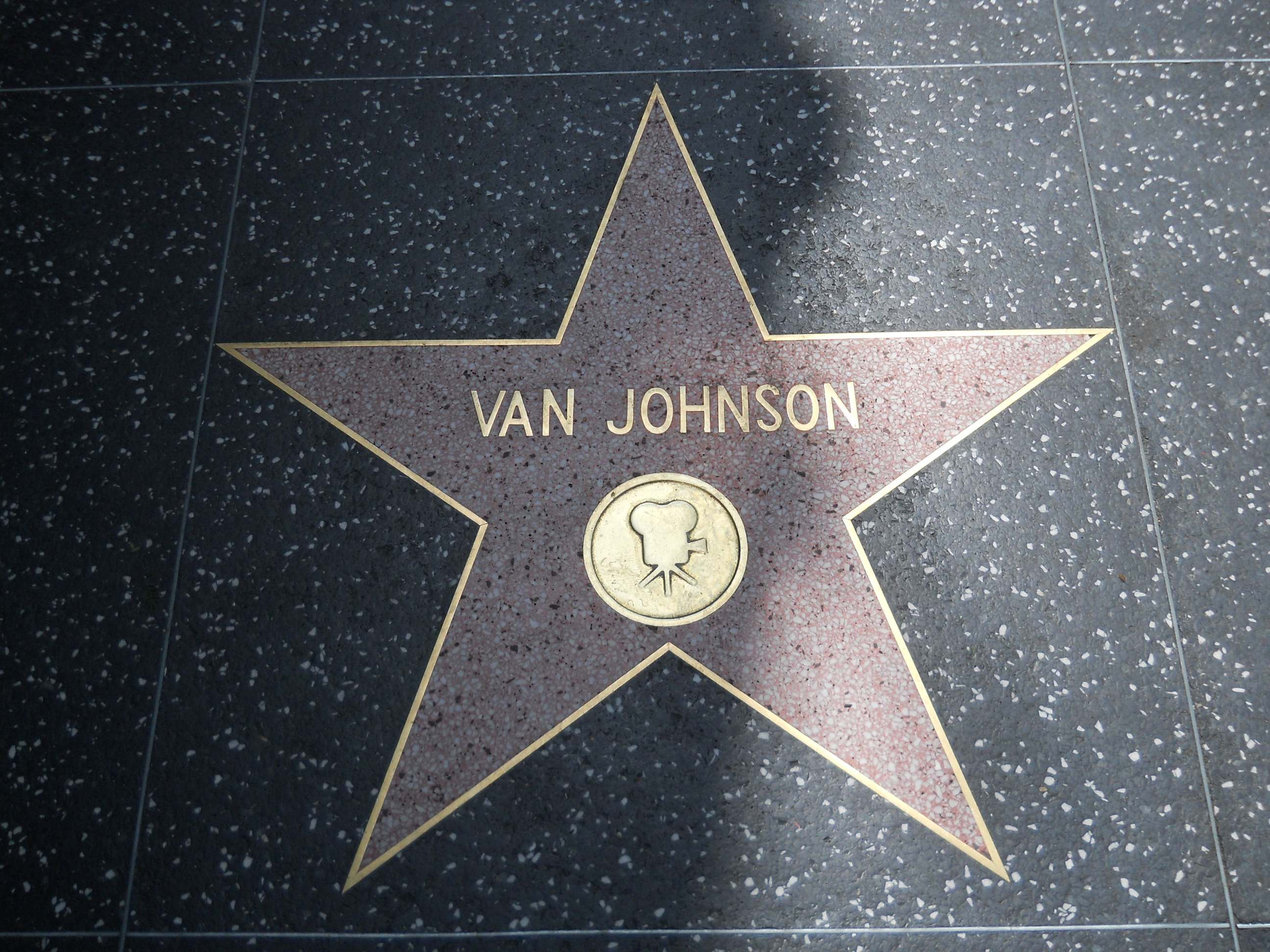
Star on Hollywood Walk of Fame at 6600 Hollywood Blvd.

Johnson retired from acting in the early 1990s and lived in a penthouse at 405 East 54th Street on Manhattan's East Side. He moved to Tappan Zee Manor, an assisted living facility in Nyack, New York, and died there on December 12, 2008, at age 92. His remains were cremated.

== Appraisal ==
Johnson was never nominated for an Academy Award and, during the height of his career, was noted mainly for his cheerful screen presence. Reflecting on his career after his death, one critic observed that Johnson was "capable of an Oscar-worthy performance, and that's more than most movie stars can claim".

== Filmography ==
=== Film ===
Year	Title	Role	Notes
1940	Too Many Girls	Chorus boy	Uncredited
1942	Murder in the Big House	Bert Bell	
1942	For the Common Defense!	Agent Pritchard	Short film
1942	Somewhere I'll Find You	Lieutenant Wade Hall	Uncredited
1942	The War Against Mrs. Hadley	Michael Fitzpatrick	
1942	Dr. Gillespie's New Assistant	Dr. Randall 'Red' Adams	
1943	The Human Comedy	Marcus Macauley	
1943	Dr. Gillespie's Criminal Case	Dr. Randall 'Red' Adams	
1943	Pilot No. 5	Everett Arnold	
1943	Madame Curie	Reporter	
1943	A Guy Named Joe	Ted Randall	
1944	Two Girls and a Sailor	John Dyckman Brown III	
1944	The White Cliffs of Dover	Sam Bennett	
1944	3 Men in White	Dr. Randall 'Red' Ames	
1944	Thirty Seconds Over Tokyo	Ted W. Lawson	
1945	Between Two Women	Dr. Randall 'Red' Adams	
1945	Thrill of a Romance	Major Thomas Milvaine	
1945	Week-End at the Waldorf	Captain James Hollis	
1946	Easy to Wed	William Stevens 'Bill' Chandler	
1946	No Leave, No Love	Sergeant Michael Hanlon	
1946	Till the Clouds Roll By	Bandleader in Elite Club	
1947	High Barbaree	Alec Brooke	
1947	The Romance of Rosy Ridge	Henry Carson	
1948	The Bride Goes Wild	Greg Rawlings	
1948	State of the Union	Spike McManus	
1948	Command Decision	Technical Sergeant Immanuel T. Evans	
1949	Mother Is a Freshman	Professor Richard Michaels	
1949	Scene of the Crime	Mike Conovan	
1949	In the Good Old Summertime	Andrew Delby Larkin	
1949	Battleground	PFC. Holley	
1950	The Big Hangover	David Muldon	
1950	Duchess of Idaho	Dick Layne	
1951	Grounds for Marriage	Dr. Lincoln I. Bartlett	
1951	Three Guys Named Mike	Mike Lawrence	
1951	Go for Broke!	Lieutenant Michael Grayson	
1951	It's a Big Country	Rev. Adam Burch	
1951	Too Young to Kiss	Eric Wainwright	
1952	Invitation	Daniel I. "Dan" Pierce	
1952	When in Rome	Father John X. Halligan	
1952	Washington Story	Joseph T. Gresham	
1952	Plymouth Adventure	John Alden	
1953	Confidentially Connie	Joe Bedloe	
1953	Remains to Be Seen	Waldo Williams	
1953	Easy to Love	Ray Lloyd	
1954	Siege at Red River	Capt. James S. Simmons / Jim Farraday	
1954	Men of the Fighting Lady	Lt. (JG) Howard Thayer	
1954	The Caine Mutiny	Lt. Stephen Maryk, USNR	
1954	Brigadoon	Jeff Douglas	
1954	The Last Time I Saw Paris	Charles Wills	
1955	The End of the Affair	Maurice Bendrix	
1956	The Bottom of the Bottle	Donald Martin / Eric Bell	
1956	Miracle in the Rain	Pvt 1st class Arthur Hugenon	
1956	23 Paces to Baker Street	Phillip Hannon	
1957	Slander	Scott Ethan Martin	
1957	Kelly and Me	Len Carmody	
1957	Action of the Tiger	Carson	
1959	The Last Blitzkrieg	Lt. Hans Von Kroner / Sgt. Leonard Richardson	
1959	Subway in the Sky	Major Baxter Grant	
1959	Beyond This Place	Paul Mathry	
1960	The Enemy General	Allan Lemaire	
1963	Wives and Lovers	Bill Austin	
1967	Divorce American Style	Al Yearling	
1968	Where Angels Go, Trouble Follows	Father Chase	
1968	Yours, Mine and Ours	Warrant Officer Darrel Harrison	
1969	Eagles Over London	Air Marshal George Taylor	
1969	The Price of Power	President James A. Garfield	Italian title: Il prezzo del potere
1971	Eye of the Spider	Professor Orson Krüger	Italian title: L'occhio del ragno
1979	The Concorde Affair	Captain Scott	Italian title: Concorde Affaire '79
1979	From Corleone to Brooklyn	Lieutenant Sturges	Italian title: Da Corleone a Brooklyn
1980	The Kidnapping of the President	Vice President Ethan Richards	
1982	Scorpion with Two Tails	Mr. Mulligan	
1985	The Purple Rose of Cairo	Larry Wilde	
1988	Laggiù nella giungla	Professor	
1988	Taxi Killer	Police Lt. R. Bradford	
1989	Killer Crocodile	Judge	
1990	Flight from Paradise	Old Narrator	
1991	Delta Force Commando II: Priority Red One	Gen. McCailland	
1992	Clowning Around	Mr. Ranthow	
1992	Three Days to a Kill	Comm. Howard	(final film role)

=== Television ===
Year	Title	Role	Notes
1955	I Love Lucy	Himself	Episode: "The Dancing Star"
1957	The Pied Piper of Hamelin	Pied Piper/Truson	Special
1959	Dick Powell's Zane Grey Theatre	Frank Gilette	Episode: "Deadfall"
1960	General Electric Theater	Jimmy Devlin	Episode: "At Your Service"
1960	The Ann Sothern Show	Terry Tyler	Episode: "Loving Arms"
1965	Ben Casey	Frank Dawson	Episode: "A Man, a Maid, and a Marionette"
1966	Batman	The Minstrel	Episodes: "The Minstrel's Shakedown" / "Barbecued Batman?"
1966	The Doomsday Flight	Captain Anderson	TV movie
1967	The Danny Thomas Hour	Charlie Snow	Episode: "Is Charlie Coming?"
1968	Here's Lucy	Himself	Episode: "Guess Who Owes Lucy $23.50?"
1971	The Men from Shiloh	Alonzo	Episode: "The Angus Killer"
1971	The Doris Day Show	Charlie Webb	Episodes: "Cousin Charlie" / "The Albatross"
1971	Love, American Style	Don	Segment: "Love and the House Bachelor"
1972	Maude	Henry	Episode: "Flashback"
1974	McCloud	Dan Kiley	Episode: "This Must Be the Alamo"
1974	McMillan & Wife	Harry Jerome	Episode: "Downshift to Danger"
1974	The Girl on the Late, Late Show	Johnny Leverett	TV movie
1976	Rich Man, Poor Man	Marsh Goodwin	Miniseries
1976–77	Rich Man, Poor Man Book II	Marsh Goodwin	Miniseries
1977	Quincy, M.E.	Al Ringerman	Episodes: "Snake Eyes" (Parts 1 & 2)
1978–82	The Love Boat	Various roles	3 episodes
1982	One Day at a Time	Gus Webster	Episode: "Grandma's Nest Egg"
1982	Night of 100 Stars	Himself	Special
1983	The Forgotten Story	Perry	Miniseries
1983	Tales of the Unexpected	Gerry T. Armstrong	Episode: "Down Among the Sheltering Palms"
1984–90	Murder, She Wrote	Various roles	3 episodes
1985	Night of 100 Stars II	Himself	Special
1988	Alfred Hitchcock Presents	Art Bellasco	Episode: "Killer Takes All"
1989	Coming of Age	"Red" Pepper	Episode: "Pauline et Rouge"

=== Box office ranking ===
For a number of years film exhibitors voted Johnson among the most popular stars in the country:

- 1945 – 2nd (US)
- 1946 – 3rd (US)
- 1950 – 18th (US)
- 1951 – 24th (US)

== Stage appearances ==
Year	Title	Role	Venue	Notes	Ref.
1936	Eight Men in Manhattan	Performer	Rainbow Room, New York		
1936	New Faces of 1936	Performer	Vanderbilt Theatre, New York	Broadway debut	
1937	New Faces of 1937	Performer	The Cape Playhouse, Dennis		
1939	Too Many Girls	Student / Jojo Jordan / Clint Kelley	Imperial Theatre, New York		
1940–41	Pal Joey	Victor / Dancer	Ethel Barrymore Theatre, New York		
1940–41	Pal Joey	Victor / Dancer	Shubert Theatre, New York		
1940–41	Pal Joey	Victor / Dancer	St. James Theatre, New York		
1959	Damn Yankees	Mr. Applegate	Toyota Oakdale Theatre, Wallingford		
1959	Damn Yankees	Mr. Applegate	Warwick Musical Theatre, Warwick		
1960–62	The Music Man	Professor Harold Hill	Bristol Hippodrome, Bristol		
1960–62	The Music Man	Professor Harold Hill	Adelphi Theatre, London	West End debut	
1962–63	The Music Man	Professor Harold Hill	U.S. tour		
1962	Come On Strong	Herbert H. Lundquist	Morosco Theatre, New York		
1963–65	Bye Bye Birdie	Albert Peterson	U.S. tour		
1964	A Thousand Clowns		Northeast U.S. tour		
1965	Mating Dance	Bruce Barrett	Eugene O'Neill Theatre, New York		
1965	19th Tony Awards	Himself (host)	Hotel Astor, New York		
1966	On a Clear Day You Can See Forever	Dr. Mark Bruckner	U.S. tour		
1968	Bells Are Ringing		Music Hall at Fair Park, Dallas		
1968	The Great Sebastians		Midwest U.S. tour		
1968	There's a Girl in My Soup	Robert Danvers	Southeast U.S. tour		
1970	Boeing-Boeing	Robert	The Cape Playhouse, Dennis		
1971	Damn Yankees	Mr. Applegate	The Melody Top, Milwaukee		
1971	There's a Girl in My Soup	Robert Danvers	U.S. tour		
1971	There's a Girl in My Soup	Robert Danvers	The Little Theatre on the Square, Sullivan		
1972	Help Stamp Out Marriage	David Lord	U.S. tour		
1972	Help Stamp Out Marriage	David Lord	The Little Theatre on the Square, Sullivan		
1973	There's a Girl in My Soup	Robert Danvers	Carousel Dinner Theatre, Akron		
1973	The Music Man	Professor Harold Hill	The Melody Top, Milwaukee		
1974	Help Stamp Out Marriage	David Lord	Country Dinner Playhouse, Dallas		
1974	6 Rms Riv Vu	Paul Friedman	Drury Lane Theatre, Chicago		
1975	Boeing-Boeing	Robert	U.S. tour		
1975	Send Me No Flowers		The Cape Playhouse, Dennis		
1977	How to Succeed in Business Without Really Trying	J.B. Biggley	The Melody Top, Milwaukee		
1979	Damn Yankees	Mr. Applegate	San Jose Center for the Performing Arts, San Jose		
1980	Tribute	Scottie Templeton	Hanna Theatre, Cleveland		
1980	Tribute	Scottie Templeton	Merle Reskin Theatre, Chicago		
1980	Tribute	Scottie Templeton	Park Place Hotel, Traverse		
1981	Showboat	Captain Andy Hawks	Hilton U. Brown Theater, Indianapolis		
1981	Showboat	Captain Andy Hawks	Atlanta Civic Center, Atlanta		
1981	Showboat	Captain Andy Hawks	The Muny, St. Louis		
1983	No, No, Nanette	Jimmy Smith	E. J. Thomas Hall, Akron		
1983	No, No, Nanette	Jimmy Smith	Dayton Memorial Hall, Dayton		
1983	The Music Man	Professor Harold Hill	Broadway Sacramento, Sacramento		
1984	Showboat	Captain Andy Hawks	Casa Mañana, Fort Worth		
1985	La Cage aux Folles	Georges	Palace Theatre, New York	Replacement	
1987	Happy Birthday, Mr. Abbott!	Performer	Palace Theatre, New York		
1988	Anything Goes	Moonface Martin	Casa Mañana, Fort Worth		
1989	Workaholic				
1990	No, No, Nanette	Jimmy Smith	The Muny, St. Louis		
1991	Showboat	Captain Andy Hawks	Raymond Theatre, Pasadena	Previews only	
1992	On Borrowed Time	Julian Northrup	Birmingham Theatre, Birmingham		

== Radio appearances ==
Year	Program	Episode/source
1944	The Burns and Allen Show	NA
1946	Lux Radio Theatre	You Came Along
1946	The Jack Benny Show	Weekend at the ACME Plaza
1952	Cavalcade of America	Billy the Kid
1953	Theatre Guild on the Air	State Fair
1953	Broadway Playhouse	Detective Story

== Awards and nominations ==
Award	Year	Category	Work	Result
Primetime Emmy Award	1976	Outstanding Guest Actor in a Drama Series	Rich Man, Poor Man	Nominated
