= Sam Zimbalist =

American film producer and editor

- Born: March 31, 1901; New York City, New York, U.S.
- Died: November 4, 1958 (aged 57); Rome, Italy
- Resting place: Hillside Memorial Park, Culver City, California
- Occupations: Film producer; film editor
- Years active: 1920–1958
- Spouses: Margaret C. Donovan (1924–1950; divorce); Mary Taylor (1952–1958; his death)

Sam Zimbalist (March 31, 1901 – November 4, 1958) was an American film producer and film editor.

== Early life ==
Born to a Jewish family, Zimbalist began his career at 16 as an office boy to Metro Studios president Richard A. Rowland. He began to do some editing in his spare time when films needed to be trimmed to meet censorship requirements.

He became friends with actress Alla Nazimova, who was under contract to Metro and told her of his desire to be a full editor. She invited him out to Hollywood in 1920 to become second assistant editor on her films. In 1923, when Nazimova's contract with Metro ended, he returned with her to New York and became her assistant stage manager on Broadway.

== Film editor ==
In 1924, Zimbalist returned to Los Angeles seeking film work. Metro pictures had merged with Sam Goldwyn's company to become MGM. Zimbalist went to work for them as an assistant editor and soon worked his way up to full editor. He edited the 1925 version of The Wizard of Oz. Among the films he edited at MGM were Lon Chaney's While the City Sleeps (1928), Alias Jimmy Valentine, the studio's first sound film, and The Broadway Melody (1929), the first sound musical.

== Film producer ==
He was promoted to assistant producer in 1929, working for Hunt Stromberg and became a producer on his own in 1936, with Married Before Breakfast.

He produced films including Thirty Seconds Over Tokyo (1944), the story of the Doolittle Raiders, King Solomon's Mines (1950) and Quo Vadis (1951). The latter two both received Academy Award nominations for Best Picture. Quo Vadis was MGM's second-highest-grossing film at the time behind Gone with the Wind and MGM's most profitable film of the era with worldwide rentals of $23 million on a cost of $7 million.

Based on the success of Quo Vadis, he was made producer of MGM's most elaborate production until that time, the 1959 epic Ben-Hur.

He received a posthumous Academy Award for Ben-Hur, becoming the first person to win Best Picture posthumously. His Oscar was accepted by his widow Mary Zimbalist, who made a speech in honor of her husband. Ben-Hur was even more profitable than Quo Vadis becoming MGM's second-highest-grossing film at the time (again, behind Gone With the Wind) making Zimbalist the producer of the second- and third-highest-grossing films at the studio.

== Personal life ==
Zimbalist married Margaret C. Donovan in 1924. They divorced in 1950. He then married Mary Taylor, a former fashion model and actress, in 1952.

== Death ==
On November 4, 1958, Zimbalist collapsed suddenly of a heart attack on set in Rome, Italy, during filming of Ben-Hur. He was taken to his villa where he died.

He was buried at the Hillside Memorial Park Cemetery in Culver City, California, and left an estate of $500,000.

== Selected filmography ==
- The Wizard of Oz (1925) – editor
- The Dome Doctor (1925) (short) – editor
- The Cloudhopper (1925) (short) – editor
- The Unchastened Woman (1925) – editor
- Johnny Get Your Hair Cut (1927) – editor
- The Bugle Call (1927) – editor
- Foreign Devils (1927) – editor
- Buttons (1927) – editor
- Baby Mine (1928) – editor
- The Smart Set (1928) – editor
- Diamond Handcuffs (1928) – editor
- The Adventurer (1928) – editor
- While the City Sleeps (1928) – editor
- Alias Jimmy Valentine (1928) – editor
- Gus Edwards' Song Revue (1929) (short) – editor
- The Broadway Melody (1929) – editor
- Song of the Roses (1929) (short) – editor
- Our Modern Maidens (1929) – editor
- Tarzan Escapes (1936) – associate producer
- Married Before Breakfast (1937) – producer
- London by Night (1937) – producer
- Navy Blue and Gold (1937) – producer
- Paradise for Three (1938) – producer
- The Crowd Roars (1938) – producer
- Tarzan Finds a Son (1939) – producer
- Lady of the Tropics (1939) – producer
- These Glamour Girls (1939) – producer
- Boom Town (1940) – producer
- Tortilla Flat (1940) – producer
- 30 Seconds Over Tokyo (1944) – producer
- Adventure (1945) – producer
- Killer McCoy (1947) – producer
- Side Street (1949) – producer
- King Solomon's Mines (1950) – producer
- Too Young to Kiss (1951) – producer
- Quo Vadis? (1951) – producer
- Mogambo (1953) – producer
- Beau Brummell (1954) – producer
- Tribute to a Bad Man (1956) – producer
- The Catered Affair (1956) – producer
- The Barretts of Wimpole Street (1957) – producer
- I Accuse! (1959) – producer
- Ben-Hur (1959) – producer

=== Unmade films ===
- adaptation of Robinson Crusoe (1947) with Spencer Tracy and later Stewart Granger
