= King Solomon's Mines (1950 film) =

1950 film by Andrew Marton, Compton Bennett

- Original film poster
- Directed by: Compton Bennett; Andrew Marton
- Screenplay by: Helen Deutsch
- Based on: King Solomon's Mines (1885 novel) by H. Rider Haggard
- Produced by: Sam Zimbalist
- Starring: Deborah Kerr; Stewart Granger; Richard Carlson
- Cinematography: Robert Surtees
- Edited by: Ralph E. Winters; Conrad A. Nervig
- Music by: Mischa Spoliansky
- Production company: Metro-Goldwyn-Mayer
- Distributed by: Loew's, Inc
- Release dates: November 9, 1950 (New York City); November 24, 1950 (U.S.)
- Running time: 103 minutes
- Country: United States
- Language: English
- Budget: $2.3 million
- Box office: $15.1 million

King Solomon's Mines is a 1950 American adventure film, the second film adaptation of the 1885 novel by H. Rider Haggard. It is directed by Compton Bennett and Andrew Marton, and stars Deborah Kerr, Stewart Granger and Richard Carlson. The screenplay was written by Helen Deutsch.

The film was released by Metro-Goldwyn-Mayer on November 24, 1950. It was a critical and commercial success, winning Best Cinematography (Color) and Best Film Editing at the 23rd Academy Awards, with an additional nomination for Best Picture.

== Plot ==
In British East Africa (colonial era Kenya) in 1897, experienced British safari guide Allan Quatermain is persuaded by Elizabeth Curtis to find her husband, who disappeared in the unexplored African interior while searching for the legendary King Solomon’s mines. She has a copy of the map that her husband had followed. Elizabeth and her brother John Goode join the adventure. Allan has no use for women on a safari, but during the long and grueling journey, he and Elizabeth begin to fall in love.

The party encounters Van Brun, a lone white man living with a tribe, and learn that he had met Mr. Curtis. However, when Allan recognizes him as a fugitive who will not let them depart, they take him hostage to leave the village safely. Van Brun tries to shoot Allan, killing his faithful right-hand man Khiva instead. Allan dispatches Van Brun and the party flees from the angry villagers.

They meet a tall mysterious native, Umbopa, who joins them. When they finally reach the region where the mines are believed to exist, they are met by people who resemble him and they discover that Umbopa is royalty who has returned to attempt to dethrone the usurper King Twala. Umbopa leaves with his supporters to raise a rebellion, while Allan, Elizabeth and John travel to a tense meeting with Twala at his kraal. With his last rifle bullet, John kills an attacker, temporarily quelling the natives.

The king's advisor Gagool communicates that the tribe has seen Curtis and leads them to a cave that contains a trove of jewels and his skeletal remains. While they are distracted, Gagool triggers a booby trap that seals the adventurers inside. They find a way out through an underground river and reunite with Umbopa and his followers. They all return to Twala's compound.

Umbopa's people decide a disputed kingship by having the two claimants duel to the death. Despite cheating by one of Twala's men, Umbopa wins. He then provides an escort for his friends' return trip.

== Cast ==
Credits from the AFI Catalog of Feature Films.

- Deborah Kerr as Elizabeth Curtis
- Stewart Granger as Allan Quatermain
- Richard Carlson as John Goode
- Hugo Haas as Van Brun ("Smith")
- Lowell Gilmore as Eric Masters
- Kimursi as Khiva
- Siriaque as Umbopa
- Sekaryongo as Chief Gagool
- Baziga as King Twala
- Munto Anampio as Chief Bilu
- Gutare as Kafa
- Ivargwema as Blue Star
- Benempinga as Black Circle
- John Banner as Austin
- Henry Rowland as Traum

== Production ==
In November 1946, MGM announced it had purchased film rights to the novel from Gaumont British, which had produced the 1937 adaptation. Sam Zimbalist was named as producer. In October 1948, Helen Deutsch was assigned to write the script.

MGM typically produced one or two large-scale overseas films per year during this era. When Quo Vadis was postponed, MGM elected to film King Solomon's Mines on location in Africa. Production equipment was delivered by a convoy of Dodge trucks traveling a total distance of more than 70,000 miles (110,000 km).

=== Adaptation ===
Like virtually all film versions, this also changes Haggard's plot to include a female lead. But it strays even further from the novel than the 1937 British adaptation King Solomon's Mines. There are several African characters in the book, particularly Umbopa, a king in disguise. In the earlier film, Paul Robeson received top billing for the role, whereas in this version, Umbopa's importance is greatly reduced.

=== Casting ===
Deborah Kerr was announced as the female lead in July 1949. MGM wanted Errol Flynn to co-star. The same month Compton Bennett was signed to direct; he had just finished That Forsyte Woman for MGM with Flynn.

Flynn eventually chose instead to star in Kim. Stewart Granger was signed to play the role in August 1949. Richard Carlson was cast in September.

=== Filming ===
Filming in Africa took place at Murchison Falls in Uganda; Astrida, "the land of giant Watusis"; Volcano Country and Stanleyville in the Belgian Congo; Tanganyika; and Rumuruti and Machakos in Kenya. Bunny Allen, the renowned big game hunter and safari guide, was the film's technical adviser. The cave scene was filmed in the Slaughter Canyon Cave at Carlsbad Caverns National Park and some other scenes were shot at nearby Sitting Bull Falls in Lincoln National Forest, New Mexico.

The film marked the beginning of Eva Monley's career as a Hollywood script supervisor, producer and location scout specializing in African locations.

In February 1950, after five months of location filming in Africa, Andrew Marton replaced Compton Bennett as director. The official reason announced was that Bennett had fallen ill, but it was rumored that the cause was rooted in Bennett's disagreements with some of the cast.

== Reception ==
=== Box office ===
According to MGM records, the film earned $5,047,000 in the U.S. and Canada and $4,908,000 elsewhere. After production and other associated costs were deducted, the film returned a profit of $4,049,000, making it MGM's most successful film of 1950 and the second highest-grossing film of that year in the United States.

The film was the third most popular film at the British box-office in 1951. It was also a big hit in France, with admissions of 4,108,770.

=== Critical response ===
Bosley Crowther of The New York Times wrote that "there is more than a trace of outright hokum in this thriller ... but there is also an ample abundance of scenic novelty and beauty to compensate." Variety called the film a "striking adventure film" with "high excitement in meetings with wild savages and beasts and a number of excellently staged fights-to-the-death." Harrison's Reports called the film "a highly spectacular romantic adventure melodrama that has the rare quality of holding an audience captivated from start to finish." John McCarten of The New Yorker wrote, "'King Solomon's Mines' undertakes to show what a safari through Africa might have been up against fifty years ago. In this, I think, the picture, which was shot in the African highlands, succeeds admirably." The Monthly Film Bulletin called the film "a somewhat stilted epic, strangely lacking in excitement", with Kerr seeming "miscast and out of place."

=== Awards and nominations ===
At the 23rd Academy Awards, Robert L. Surtees won the Academy Award for Best Cinematography, Color, while Ralph E. Winters and Conrad A. Nervig won for Best Film Editing. The film was nominated for Best Picture.

== Radio adaptation ==
King Solomon's Mines was presented on Lux Radio Theatre on December 1, 1952. The one-hour adaptation featured Kerr and Granger in their screen roles.

A parody version was performed on Jack Benny's radio show over two episodes, on January 7 and January 14, 1951, with Benny playing opposite Kerr.
