= André Michaux =

French botanist and explorer (1746–1802)

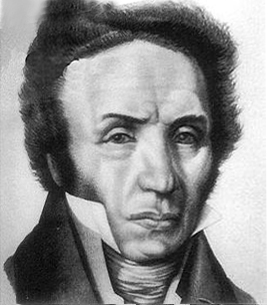
- Born: 8 March 1746; Satory, Versailles, France
- Died: 11 October 1802 (aged 56); Tamatave (Toamasina), Madagascar
- Citizenship: French
- Children: François André Michaux
- Scientific career
- Fields: Botany
- Academic advisors: Bernard de Jussieu
- Author abbrev. (botany): Michx.

André Michaux (Pronounced → ahn-dray mee-show; sometimes anglicised as Andrew Michaud; 8 March 1746 – 11 October 1802) was a French botanist and explorer. He is most noted for his study of North American flora. In addition Michaux collected specimens in England, Spain, France, and even Persia. His work was part of a larger European effort to gather knowledge about the natural world. Michaux's contributions include Histoire des chênes de l'Amérique (1801; "The Oaks of North America") and Flora Boreali-Americana (1803; "The Flora of North America") which continued to be botanical references well into the 19th century. His son, François André Michaux, also became an authoritative botanist.

== Biography ==
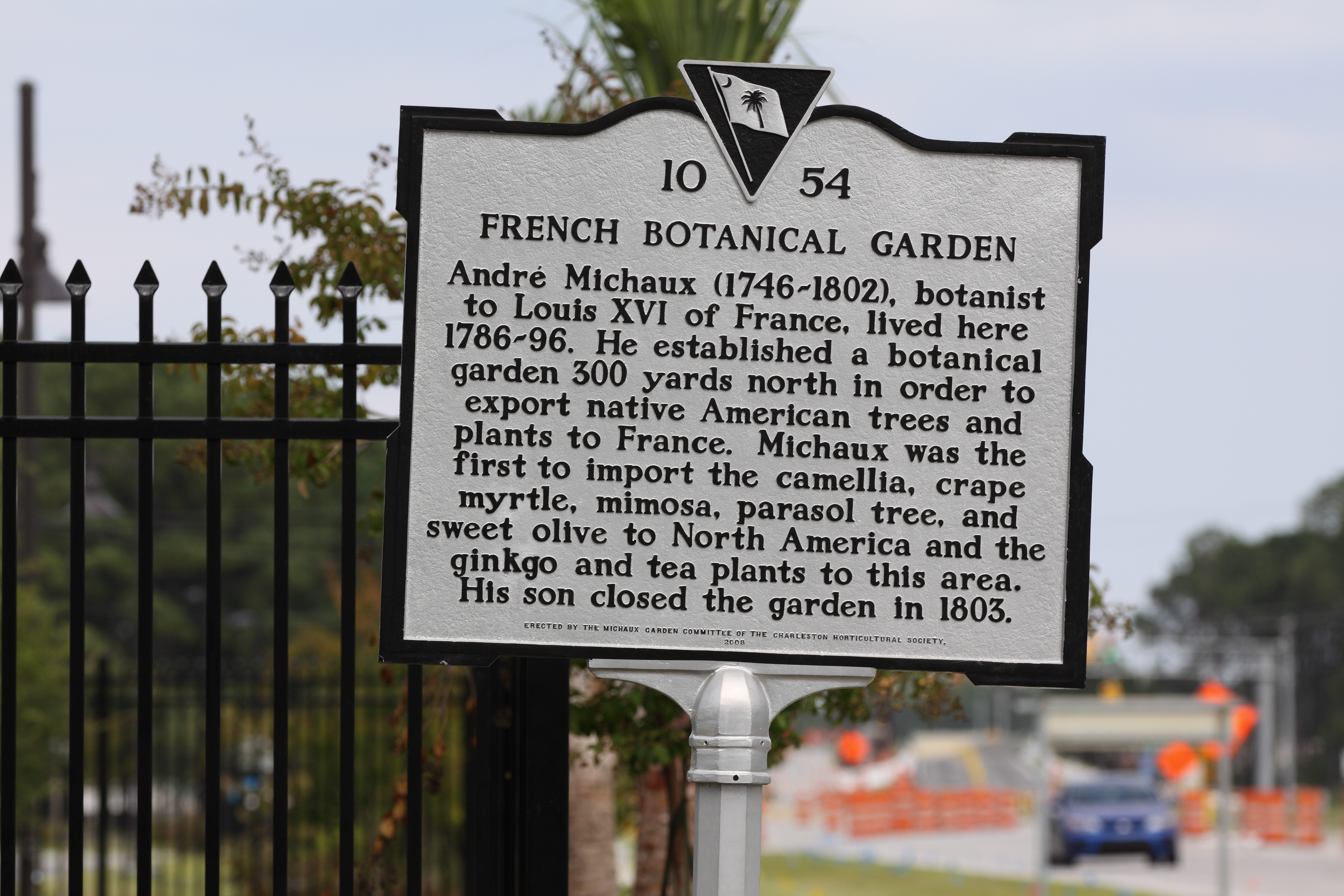
Historical marker off Aviation Ave in North Charleston, South Carolina

Michaux was born in Satory, part of Versailles, Yvelines, where his father managed farmland on the king's estate. Michaux was trained in the agricultural sciences in anticipation of his one-day assuming his father's duties, and received a basic classical 18th century education, including Latin and some Greek, until he was fourteen. In 1769, he married Cecil Claye, the daughter of a prosperous farmer; she died a year later giving birth to their son, François André. Michaux then took up the study of botany and became a student of Bernard de Jussieu. In 1779 he spent time studying botany in England, and in 1780 he explored Auvergne, the Pyrenees and northern Spain. In 1782 he was sent by the French government as secretary to the French consul on a botanical mission to Persia. His journey began unfavourably, as he was robbed of all his equipment except his books; but he gained influential support in Persia after curing the shah of a dangerous illness. After two years he returned to France with a fine herbarium, and also introduced numerous Eastern plants into the botanical gardens of France.

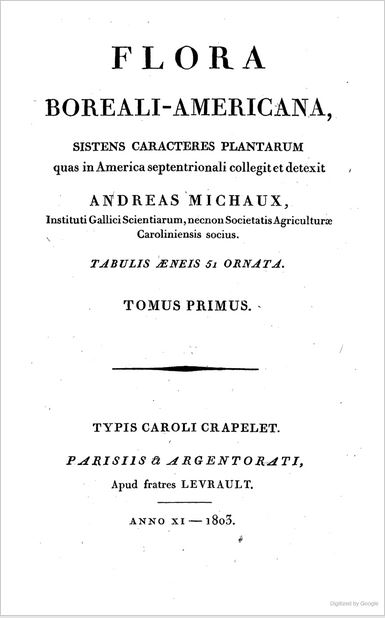
Title page of Flora Boreali-Americana: sistens characteres plantarum, Volume 1

André Michaux was appointed by Louis XVI as Royal botanist under the General Director of the Bâtiments du Roi and sent to the United States in 1785 with an annual salary of 2000 livres, to make the first organized investigation of plants that could be of value in French building and carpentry, medicine and agriculture. He traveled with his son François André Michaux (1770–1855) through Canada and the United States. In 1786, Michaux attempted to establish a horticultural garden of thirty acres in Bergen's Wood on the Hudson Palisades in North Bergen, New Jersey. The garden, overseen by Pierre-Paul Saunier from the Jardin des Plantes, Paris, who had emigrated with Michaux, failed because of the harsh winters. In 1787, Michaux established and maintained for a decade a botanical garden of 111 acres near what is now Aviation Avenue in North Charleston, South Carolina, from which he made many expeditions to various parts of North America. Michaux described and named many North American species during this time. Between 1785 and 1791 he shipped ninety cases of plants and many seeds to France. At the same time he introduced many species to America from various parts of the world, including Camellia, tea-olive, and crepe myrtle.

=== Proposed North American expedition ===
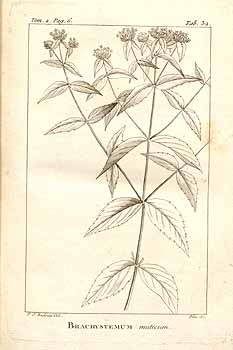
Brachystemum miticum by Pierre-Joseph Redouté from Flora Boreali-Americana

After the collapse of the French monarchy, Michaux, who was a royal botanist, lost his source of income. He solicited support for an American-funded exploration under the auspices of the American Philosophical Society.

In 1793, a decade before the Lewis and Clark Expedition, with no federal funding available, David Rittenhouse (1732–1796), President of the American Philosophical Society asked Thomas Jefferson to draft a "subscription list" to raise funds to explore the interior of North America, from the Mississippi River along the Missouri, and westward to the Pacific Ocean. Jefferson personally drew it up and secured 30 signatures, himself included, of influential, wealthy supporters, pledging various amounts to finance it:

1. U.S. President George Washington (1789–1797)
2. Vice President John Adams (1797–1801)
3. U.S. Senator from North Carolina Benjamin Hawkins (1754–1816)
4. U.S. Senator from South Carolina Ralph Izard (1741–1804)
5. Former U.S. Senator from North Carolina James Johnston (1742–1805)
6. U.S. Senator from Pennsylvania Robert Morris (1734–1806)
7. U.S. Senator from Maryland John Henry (Maryland politician) (1750–1798)
8. U.S. Senator from Massachusetts George Cabot (1751–1823)
9. U.S. Senator from New Jersey John Rutherford (born around 1760–1840) (Note: Not to be confused with John Rutherford, Sr. (1755–1841), of North Carolina, who lived on a plantation on the Catawba River, near the mouth of Muddy Creek, whose house André Michaux slept at on July 29, 1794. ("Portions of the Journal of André Michaux". 1889))
10. U.S. Secretary of War Henry Knox (1750–1806)
11. U.S. Secretary of State Thomas Jefferson (1801–1809)
12. U.S. Treasury Secretary Alexander Hamilton (1757–1804)
13. U.S. Senator from New York Rufus King (1755–1827)
14. Former New Hampshire President John Langdon (1741–1819)
15. U.S. Senator from Kentucky John Edwards (1748–1837)
16. U.S. Senator from Kentucky John Brown (1757–1837)
17. 1st Governor of Pennsylvania Thomas Mifflin (1744–1800)
18. U.S. Congressman from Connecticut Jonathan Trumbull, Jr. (1740–1809)
19. U.S. Congressman from Virginia James Madison (1809–1817)
20. Former Delegate for South Carolina to the Confederation Congress John Parker (1759–1832)
21. U.S. Congressman from Virginia Alexander White (1738–1804)
22. U.S. Congressman from Virginia John Page (1743–1808)
23. U.S. Congressman from North Carolina John Baptista Ashe (1748–1802)
24. Former U.S. Congressman from Maryland William Smith (1728–1814)
25. U.S. Congressman from Connecticut Jeremiah Wadsworth (1743–1804)
26. U.S. Congressman from Virginia Richard Bland Lee (1761–1827)
27. Pennsylvania State Representative Thomas Fitzsimons (1741–1811)
28. U.S. Congressman from Virginia Samuel Griffin (1746–1810)
29. U.S. Congressman from Virginia William Branch Giles (1762–1830)
30. U.S. Congressman from Pennsylvania John Wilkes Kittera (1752–1801)

Jefferson personally drafted the instructions (aka prospectus) for Michaux to lead the project. At the time Michaux's exploration was proposed, Meriwether Lewis (1774–1809) – an 18-year-old protégé of Jefferson – asked to be included, but was turned down by Jefferson. According to presidential historian Michael Edward Purdy (1954–2023), the "subscription list" stands as the only document of any kind signed by the first four presidents: Washington, Jefferson, Adams, and Madison.

Before Michaux was scheduled to begin, however, he volunteered to assist the French Minister to America, Edmond-Charles Genêt. Genet was promoting American support for France's wars with Britain and Spain, aggravating relations between all four nations. George Rogers Clark offered to organize and lead a militia force to capture Louisiana from the Spanish. Michaux's mission was to evaluate Clark's plan and coordinate between Clark's actions and Genet's. Michaux went to Kentucky, but, without adequate funds, Clark was unable to raise the militia and the plan eventually folded.

Ultimately, the expedition never took place.

It is not true, as sometimes reported, that Thomas Jefferson ordered Michaux to leave the United States after he learned of his involvement with Genet. Though Jefferson did not support Genet's actions, he was aware of Genet's instructions for Michaux and even provided Michaux with letters of introduction to the Governor of Kentucky.

On his return to France in 1796 he was shipwrecked, however most of his specimens survived. His two American gardens declined. Saunier, his salary unpaid, cultivated potatoes and hay and paid taxes on the New Jersey property, which is now still remembered as "The Frenchman's Garden", part of Machpelah Cemetery in North Bergen.

In 1800, Michaux sailed with Nicolas Baudin's expedition to Australia, but left the ship in Mauritius. During the expedition, Michaux was accompanied by an African slave he owned named Merlot. Michaux then went to Madagascar to investigate the flora of that island. Michaux died at Tamatave in Madagascar of a tropical fever at around 9 a.m. on 11 October 1802. His work as a botanist was chiefly done in the field, and he added largely to what was previously known of the botany of the East and of America.

In 1800, on his visit to the United States, Pierre Samuel Du Pont de Nemours, concerned about the abandoned botanical gardens, wrote to the Institut de France, who sent over Michaux's son François André Michaux to sell the properties. He sold the garden near Charleston, but the concern expressed by Du Pont and his son Eleuthère Irénée du Pont preserved the New Jersey garden in Saunier's care and continued to support it. Saunier continued to send seeds to France for the rest of his life, and is credited with introducing into gardens the chinquapin (Castanea pumila) and the smoking bean tree (Catalpa bignonioides).

Aaron Burr recorded meeting with his son, François André Michaux in Paris on September 17, 1810. According to Burr he went "to Michaux's, the botanist, who was many years in the United States, and has written a valuable little book of his travels. He is now publishing his account of our trees, which will be extremely interesting. It demonstrates that we (not the whole continent, but the United States alone) have three times the number of useful trees that Europe can boast..." Burr's cited quote would apply equally to both Michaux', father and son, and perhaps more to the son, who had been in America a total of some six years, and had recently (1804) written about his travels in America, and was subsequently working on his later opus on American trees.

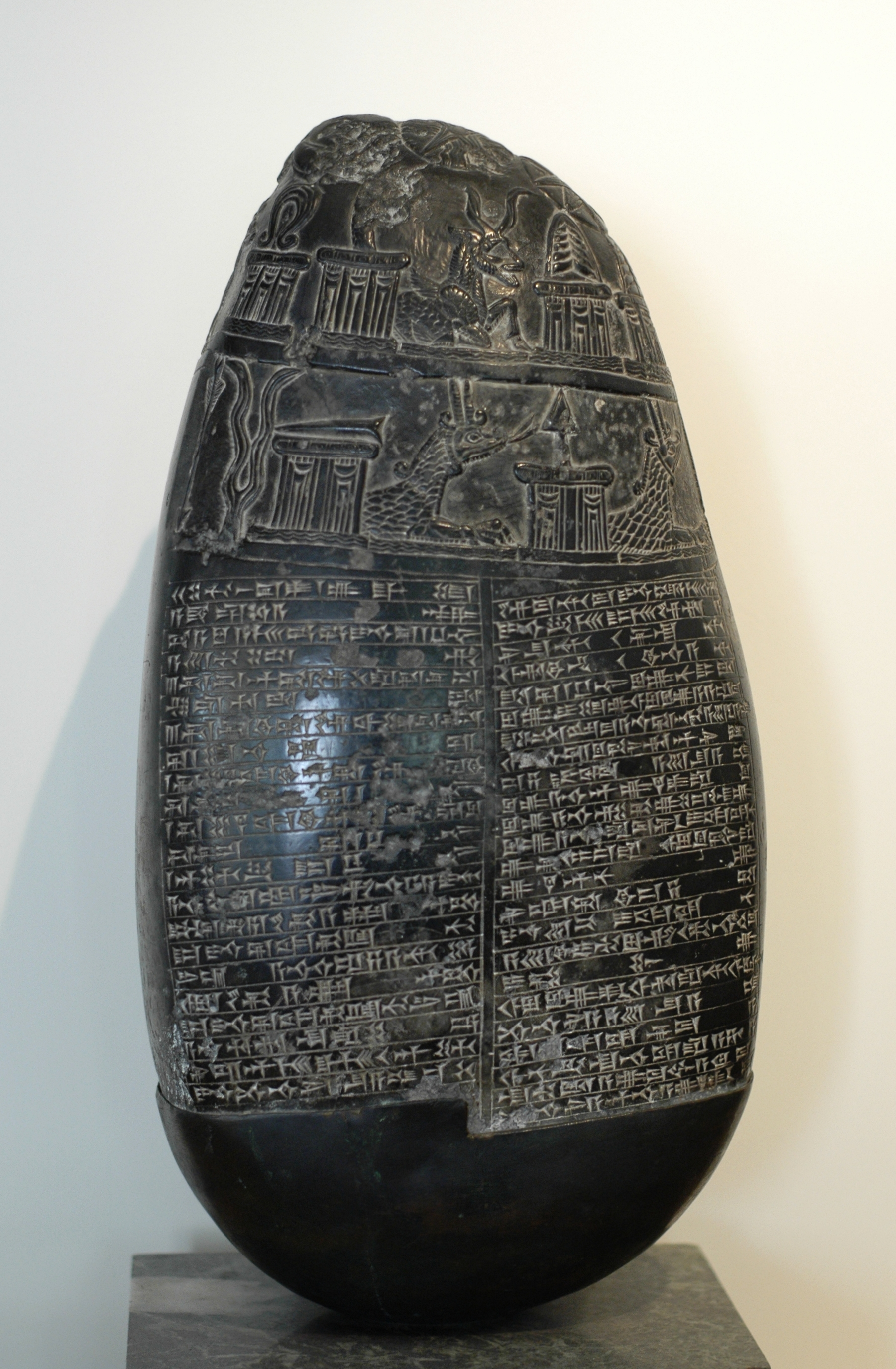
Babylonian Caillou Michaux or Michaux Stone, Bibliothèque Nationale collection.

== Legacy ==
- Carolina lily (Lilium michauxii), Michaux's saxifrage (Saxifraga michauxii), and several other plants are named for him.
- Michaux State Forest in Pennsylvania (U.S.), which protects over 344 square kilometers (over 85,000 acres), is named for him.
- André-Michaux Ecological Reserve in Quebec, Canada, which protects 450 hectares, is named for him.
- His son François André Michaux published an Histoire des arbres forestiers de l'Amérique septentrionale. 3 vols. C. d'Hautel; 1810–1813 (Charles-Louis d'Hautel; 1780–1843) (Note: Charles-Louis d'Hautel (1780–1843) – Paris bookseller and publisher at rue de La Harpe, n°. 80 – surrendered his printing license (imprimeur breveté) April 30, 1823, in favor of Paris-born Alexandre-Noël Marchand Du Breuil (1797–1864), but continued as licensed bookseller (libraire breveté) until 1930. A.-N. Marchand Du Breuil was the younger brother of historian and prefect Charles-François Marchand Du Breuil (1794–1834), author of: Du Breuil, Charles François Marchand (1827). Journées Mémorables de la Révolution Française [Memorable Days of the French Revolution] (11 vols.) (1st ed.). Paris: Published by Audin. Printed by A.-N. Marchand Du Breuil – via Google Books (Library of Catalonia). OCLC 682534381 (all editions). D'Hautel had been a Paris bookseller since 1805, or shortly before. D'Hautel became a printer-bookseller by associating around 1808 with the printer Louis Haussmann (1781–1837). D'Hautel became a licensed (i) bookseller October 1, 1812 (and renewed his license March 15, 1817) and (ii) printer April 14, 1813 (and renewed October 15, 1816) in succession to his former partner L. Haussmann. Ange-Hippolyte May (1808–1891) succeeded d'Hautel as bookseller April 5, 1830. Louis Haussmann, by way of his grandparents – Christian Haussmann (1716–1790) and Barbara Marguerite Buob (maiden; 1721–1793) – was a 1st cousin, 1 time removed, of Georges-Eugène Haussmann (1809–1891).) with 156 plates, of which an English translation appeared in 1817–1819 as The North American Sylva.
- Michaux Stone — Michaux brought a boundary stone or kudurru back from his Near Eastern trip. It was originally found by a French physician living in Baghdad, near the site of a 12th-century BCE Babylonian town named Bak-da-du. On a small part of an embankment on the Tigris—near the Al-Karkh end of the Baab El-Maudham Bridge—is another archeological site attributed to the second Babylonian period, circa 600 BCE. Michaux sold the kudurru to the "Institute Constituting the Commission for Scientific Travel and the Custodians of the Museum of Antiquities in France in 1800, for 1200 francs. The 'Michaux stone' or Caillou Michaux was then placed in the Cabinet des Médailles of the Bibliothèque Nationale at that time.

== Writings ==
Michaux wrote two valuable works on North American plants:

- Michaux, André (1801) [first published May 1801]. Histoire des chênes de l'Amérique, ou, Descriptions et figures de toutes les espèces et variétés de chênes de l'Amérique septentrionale, considérées sous les rapports de la botanique, de leur culture et de leur usage [The Oaks of North America, or, Descriptions and Figures of All the Species and Varieties of Oaks of North America, Considered in Relation to Botany, Their Cultivation and Their Use] (36 plates) (in French). Paris: de l'Imprimerie de Chapelet. Year 9 of the French Revolutionary Calendar. Retrieved July 11, 2024. OCLC 6039463 (all editions).
1. Via Internet Archive (Austrian National Library). Crapelet. 1801.
- Michaux, André (March 19, 1803). Flora Boreali-Americana: Sistens Caracteres Plantarum Quas in America Septentrionali [Boreal-American Flora: Containing the Characters of the Plants Which He Collected and Discovered in North America] (11th year of the French Revolutionary Calendar). (51 plates) (2 Vols.) (in Latin). Paris: Apud fratres Levrault (The Levrault Brothers). Year 11 of the French Revolutionary Calendar. Retrieved July 11, 2024. OCLC 8753830 (all editions).
1. Vol. 1. 1803 – via Internet Archive (Missouri Botanical Garden).
2. Vol. 1 – via Google Books (Lyon Public Library).
3. Vol. 2 – via Google Books (Austrian National Library).

Flora Boreali-Americana was first published on March 19, 1803 – five months, one week, and one day after Michaux's death. Given that it was published posthumously, scholars had expressed doubt over whether Michaux was the only author – some suspected that French botanist Louis Claude Marie Richard (1754–1821) and the younger Michaux should have been credited. In 2004, American botanist James Lauritz Reveal (1941–2015) asserted:

Richard heavily edited and revised the text drafted by the elder Michaux and saw to its publication, following the general dictates of the younger Michaux but without his direct supervision. There is no question that Richard played a major role, as a friendly editor, but at no time, to my knowledge, did the elder Richard ever assume credit for the publication of Michaux's Flora Boreali-Americana.

=== Illustrators and engravers ===
Flora Boreali-Americana has 36 engraved plates (numbered 1–36). Thirty-two are from drawings by Pierre Joseph Redouté (Austrian Netherlands → present-day Belgium; 1759–1840) and 4 are from drawings by his younger brother, Henry Joseph Redouté (fr) (Austrian Netherlands → present-day Belgium; 1766–1852). Auguste Plée (1787–1825) engraved 33 of the plates and Louis Sellier (1757–c.1835) engraved 3. Auguste was the father of engravers Victoire Plée and François P. Plée (1800–1864). Louis was the son of engraver François Noël Sellier (1737–1782). (LCCN; no98129859)

== See also ==
- Taxa named by André Michaux
- European and American voyages of scientific exploration
- François Cagnet

== Bibliography ==
=== Inline references ===
- Chisholm, Hugh, ed. (1911). The Encyclopædia Britannica – A Dictionary of Arts, Sciences, Literature and General Information (29 vols.). Vol. 18: "Medal to Mumps" (11th ed.). Cambridge University Press. pp. 361–362. Retrieved August 25, 2024. OCLC 266598 (all editions).
1. Via Wikisource.
2. Via Internet Archive. 1911.
- Cothran, James Robert (1995). Gardens of Historic Charleston. University of South Carolina Press. pp. 6–7. ISBN 978-1-57003-004-8. LCCN 94-18769; ISBN 978-1-5700-3004-8, 1-5700-3004-9; OCLC 31755741 (all editions).
  The author, Cothran, was a landscape architect, urban planner, and garden historian, and a native South Carolinian.
1. Via Google Books (limited preview).
- Jefferson, Thomas (1793). "Manuscript Subscription List Put Forward by Jefferson to Support a Proposed Scientific Expedition Under Andre Michaux". APS Legacy ID: 728.001 APSimg1138. American Philosophical Society Archives. Retrieved August 23, 2024.
1. Manuscript.
- Jefferson, Thomas. "American Philosophical Society's Instructions to André Michaux" (ca. April 30, 1793). APS Legacy ID: 728.001 APSimg1138. American Philosophical Society Archives. Retrieved August 23, 2024.
Original source: Catanzariti, John, ed. (1992). The Papers of Thomas Jefferson Vol. 25, 1 January – 10 May 1793. Princeton: Princeton University Press. pp. 624–626. JSTOR j.ctv346qmc (Vol. 25); ISBN 978-0-6911-8530-9, 0-6911-8530-1; OCLC 1043843969.
1. Transcription.
- Michaux, André (January–July 1889). "Portions of the Journal of André Michaux, Botanist, Written During His Travels in the United States and Canada, 1785 to 1796". Proceedings of the American Philosophical Society, Held at Philadelphia, for Promoting Useful Knowledge (Read Before the American Philosophical Society, October 19, 1888). ("Journal de Andre Michaux. 2d Cahier. 1787 [2nd Notebook. 1787]. Avril, 1787") [in French]. 26 (129). Introduction and Explanatory Notes [in English] by Charles Sprague Sargent (1841–1927), ed. Philadelphia: Printed for the Society by Press of Mac Calla & Company: 1–145. Retrieved August 23, 2024. ISSN 0003-049X (journal); OCLC 15556356 (all editions), and 78808460, 9974522016 (article).
1. Via Internet Archive (Cal Berkeley). Philadelphia, Press of MacCalla & co. 1889.
2. Via Google Books (Illinois).
- Mitchell, Julia Post (1916). St. Jean de Crèvecoeur. Columbia University Press. p. 104. OCLC 1043566 (all editions).
1. Via Google Books (limited preview).
- Pluchet, Régis (December 2004). "Michaux Mysteries Clarified". Castanea. Occasional Papers in Eastern Botany: No. 2. The Proceedings of the André Michaux International Symposium. 69(sp2). Southern Appalachian Botanical Society: 228–232. doi:10.2179/0008-7475(2004)sp2[228:MMC]2.0.CO;2. LCCN agr3-700033; ISSN 0008-7475 (print); ISSN 1938-4386 (web); OCLC 183413013 (all editions); JSTOR 26797077; ProQuest 201690973.
  The author, Pluchet, is a great-great-great nephew of André Michaux
- Reveal, James Lauritz (December 2004). "No Man is an Island: The Life and Times of André Michaux". Castanea. Occasional Papers in Eastern Botany: No. 2. The Proceedings of the André Michaux International Symposium. 69 (sp2). Southern Appalachian Botanical Society: 22–68. doi:10.2179/0008-7475(2004)sp2[22:NMIAIT]2.0.CO;2. JSTOR 26797057. LCCN 2006-202269, LCCN: agr37000334, LCCN sf83-9017; ISSN 0008-7475 (journal; print); ISSN 1938-4386 (journal; web); OCLC 4630538684 (article).
1. JSTOR: 26797057. JSTOR 26797057.
2. doi: Reveal, James L. (December 2004). "10.2179/0008-7475(2004)sp2[22:NMIAIT]2.0.CO;2". Castanea. 69 (sp2): 22–68. doi:10.2179/0008-7475(2004)sp2[22:NMIAIT]2.0.CO;2 – via BioOne.
- Robbins, William Jacob; Howson, Mary Christine (August 27, 1958). "André Michaux's New Jersey Garden and Pierre Paul Saunier, Journeyman Gardener". Proceedings of the American Philosophical Society. 102 (4): 351–370. JSTOR 985220. ISSN 0003-049X (journal); OCLC 15556356 (all editions) (journal); JSTOR 985220 (article); OCLC 36099611, 9974170553 (article).
- Robertson, Beth M. (2022). "Edward Stirling: Embodiment and Beneficiary of Slave-Ownership" (PDF). Australian Journal of Biography and History. 6 (6). ANU Press: The Australian National University: 103–124. doi:10.22459/AJBH.06.2022.05. ISSN 2209-9522 (journal).
- Sanders, Albert; Anderson, William Dewey Jr. (1999). Natural History Investigations in South Carolina: From Colonial Times to the Present. University of South Carolina Press. p. 29. ISBN 978-1-57003-278-3. LCCN 98-40208; ISBN 978-1-5700-3278-3; OCLC 45885737 (all editions).
1. Via Google Books (limited preview).
- Savage, Henry Jr.; Savage, Elizabeth J. (1986). André and François André Michaux. Charlottesville: University Press of Virginia. ISBN 978-0-8139-1107-6, 0-8139-1107-9; OCLC 13331907 (all editions).
- Spero, Patrick Keho (September 17, 2024). The Scientist Turned Spy: André Michaux, Thomas Jefferson, and the Conspiracy of 1793. Jeffersonian America Series. Charlottesville: University of Virginia Press. LCCN 2024-5180 (ebook), LCCN 2024-5181; ISBN 978-0-8139-5218-5, 0-8139-5218-2; OCLC 1419875993 (all editions).
- Williams, Charlie, ed. (October 1999). André Michaux (rev. August 2001). Charlotte Mecklenburg Library.
- Williams, Charlie (2004). "Explorer, Botanist, Courier, or Spy? André Michaux and the Genet Affair of 1793". Castanea. Occasional Papers in Eastern Botany: No. 2. The Proceedings of the André Michaux International Symposium. 69. Southern Appalachian Botanical Society: 98–106. doi:10.2179/0008-7475(2004)sp2[98:EBCOSA]2.0.CO;2. JSTOR 26797059. ISSN 0008-7475 (print); ISSN 1938-4386 (web); OCLC 183413013 (all editions) (journal); JSTOR 26797059 (article); OCLC 9984707357 (article).

=== General references ===
- Fishman, Gail (2001). Journeys Through Paradise: Pioneering Naturalists in the Southeast. University Press of Florida. ISBN 978-0-8130-1874-4 – via Internet Archive (LeRoy Collins Leon County Public Library). Retrieved August 25, 2024. LCCN 00-51030; ISBN 978-0-8130-1874-4, 0-8130-1874-9 (acid-free paper); ISBN 978-0-8130-6324-9, 0-8130-6324-8 (2017 e-book ed.); ISBN 978-0-8130-5486-5, 0-8130-5486-9; OCLC 982012093 (all editions).
- Hoeniger, Judith F.M. (1966). "Michaux, André". Dictionary of Canadian Biography Online (revised 1983). Vol. 5 (of 11). Halpenny, Francess Georgina CC FRSC (1919–2017), general editor. University of Toronto Press. pp. 1801–1820. Retrieved November 11, 2015. ISBN 0-8020-3398-9 (regular ed.; Vols. 1–11); ISBN 0-8020-3398-9 (Vol. 5); OCLC 22442973 (all editions) (print).
1. Online ed..
2. Via Internet Archive. 1966.
3. See Dictionary of Canadian Biography. Hoeniger was a scholar who, among other things, researched this history of natural science, especially 19th century botany and exploration. She was a faculty member of the Department of Microbiology, University of Toronto.
- Humphrey, Harry Baker (1961). "André Michaux". Makers of North American Botany. New York: The Ronald Press Company. pp. 174–176 – via Internet Archive. LCCN 61-18435; OCLC 14598432 (all editions).
- Michaux, André (2020). André Michaux in North America: Journals and Letters, 1785-1797. Translated From the French, Edited, and Annotated by Charlie Williams, Eliane M. Norman & Walter Kingsley Taylor; Foreword by James E. McClellan III. University of Alabama Press. ISBN 978-0-8173-9244-4, 0-8173-9244-0; OCLC 13331907 (all editions).
- Pluchet, Régis (2014). l'Extraordinaire Voyage d'un Botaniste en Perse [The Extraordinary Journey of a Botanist in Persia]. Toulouse: Éditions Privat. ISBN 978-2-7089-1777-4, 2708-9-1777-3; OCLC 891655599 (all editions).

=== More sources ===
- Works by or about André Michaux at the Internet Archive
- Michaux, F. Andrew (François André). Histoire des Arbres Forestiers de l'Amérique Septentrionale: Considérés Principalement sous les Rapports de Leur Usage dans les Arts et de Leur Introduction dans le Commerce, Ainsi que d'Après les Avantages qu'Ils Peuvent Offrir aux Gouvernemens en Europe et aux Personnes Qui Veulent Former de Grandes Plantations [History of the Forest Trees of North America: Considered Mainly in Relation to Their Use in the Arts and Their Introduction Into Commerce, as Well as From the Advantages Which They Can Offer to Governments in Europe and to People Who Want to Form Large Plantations] (in French).
L. Haussmann and d'Hautel, Paris (3 Vols.)
1. Vol. 1. 1810 – via Google Books (Harvard).
2. Vol. 2. Paris, Impr. de C. Haussmann et d'Hautel. 1811 – via Internet Archive (Harvard).
L. Haussmann, Paris (3 Vols.)
1. Vol. 2. 1812 – via Google Books (Lyon).
2. Vol. 1 (microfiche ed.). 1986 [1813]. ISBN 978-0-665-53756-1 – via Internet Archive (Alberta).
3. Vol. 2. 1813 – via Google Books (Harvard).
4. Vol. 3. 1813 – via HathiTrust (Astor Library).
5. Vol. 3. 1813 – via Google Books (Austria).
