= Tom Fadden =

American actor (1895–1980)

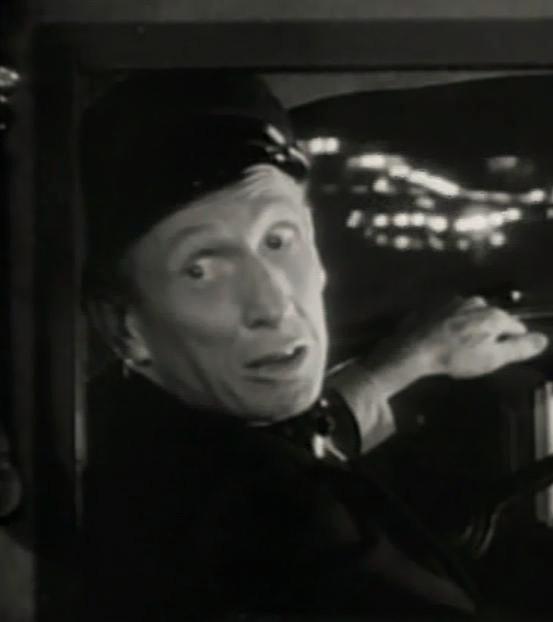
- Tom Fadden in The Strange Love of Martha Ivers (1946)
- Born: January 6, 1895; Bayard, Iowa, U.S.
- Died: April 14, 1980 (aged 85); Vero Beach, Florida, U.S.
- Occupation: Actor
- Years active: 1915–1977
- Spouses: Genevieve Bartolocci; Jane Fadden

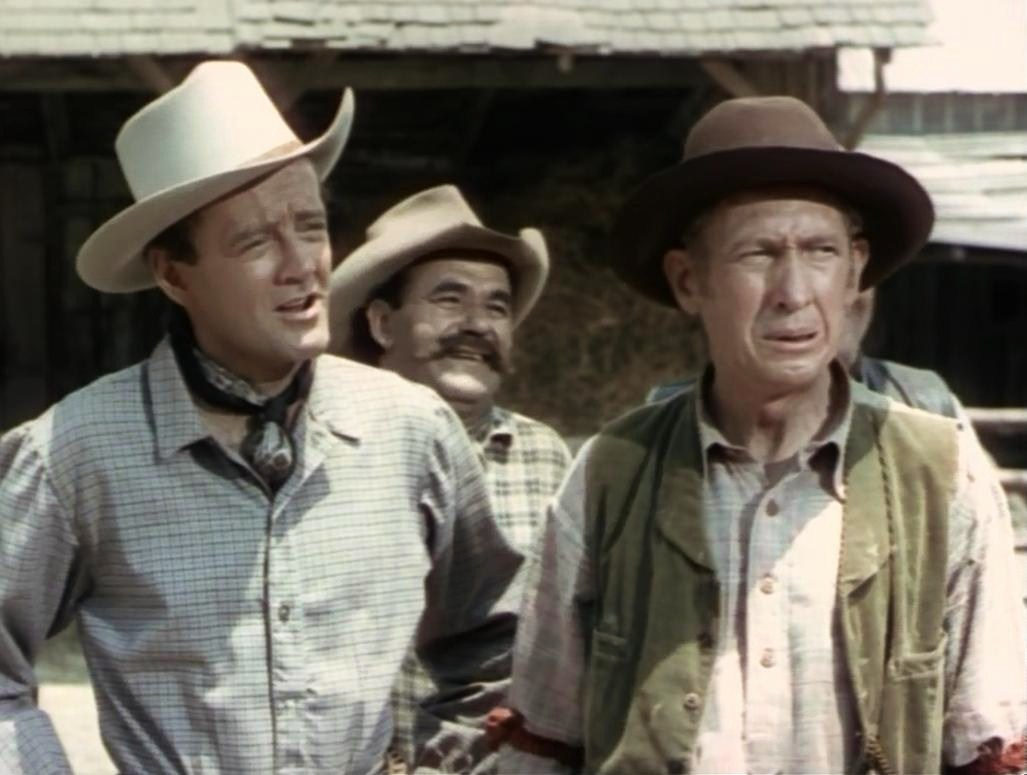
Robert Walker and Tom Fadden (right) in Vengeance Valley (1951)

Tom Fadden (January 6, 1895 – April 14, 1980) was an American actor. He performed on the stage, vaudeville, in films and on television during his long career.

== Early life ==
Fadden was born in Bayard, Iowa, on January 6, 1895; his father was a mining engineer. Early in life the family moved farther west, moving from state to state, including the Dakotas, Colorado, Wyoming, Idaho, Oregon, and Nebraska. In Nebraska Fadden graduated from Creighton University. Although he acted in high school plays, his career plan was to be a lawyer. He eventurally decided that he was not suited for a career in law, and he began performing with a stock theater troupe.

== Career ==
After graduating from college, Fadden joined a theater company in Omaha, Nebraska, in 1915. He acted in stock companies and vaudeville during the 1910s and 1920s. In 1924 he made his Broadway debut, starring as Peter Jekyll in The Wonderful Visit. Over the next fifteen years he appeared in almost two dozen productions on the Great White Way, including Nocturne (1925), The Butter and Egg Man (1925–26), Elmer Gantry (1928), The Petrified Forest (1935) and Our Town (1938). During a revival of The Butter and Egg Man in London Fadden met and married his first wife, Genevieve Bartolocci.

He made his film debut with a small role in 1939's I Stole a Million, which stars George Raft and Claire Trevor. His next film, Destry Rides Again, starred Marlene Dietrich and James Stewart. His film career spanned almost forty years, and encompassed over 90 films, mostly in small or supporting roles, although with an occasional starring role, as in 1940's Zanzibar and the 1940 serial Winners of the West.

In the 1940s he appeared in other films such as the Bob Hope comedy, My Favorite Blonde (1942); Pardon My Sarong (1942), starring Abbott and Costello; The Naughty Nineties (1945), again starring Abbott and Costello; the film noir, The Big Sleep (1946), starring Humphrey Bogart and Lauren Bacall; and director Frank Capra's It's a Wonderful Life (1946), where Fadden portrayed the tollhouse keeper on the bridge, who reacts to Clarence's (the angel) explanation of who he is to George Bailey (James Stewart). Capra remembered Fadden's work and cast him among many of Capra's old cronies for the 1961 Damon Runyon comedy Pocketful of Miracles (1961).

Tom Fadden bore more than a passing resemblance to familiar character player Irving Bacon, and in time they both wound up playing similar mild-mannered roles. In the 1950s, Fadden appeared in Dallas (1950), starring Gary Cooper and Ruth Roman; 1956's Invasion of the Body Snatchers, where his character is one of the first victims to succumb to the alien invaders; and Baby Face Nelson (1957), starring Mickey Rooney and Carolyn Jones.

Fadden was also an early arrival on television. One of his first TV roles was that of Eben Kent, the earthman who adopts Kal-El on the inaugural episode of The Adventures of Superman. He appeared in other television shows during the decade, including recurring roles on Broken Arrow (1956–58) and Cimarron City (1958–59). Although he appeared in few films in the 1960s, he worked regularly on television during the decade, including Gunsmoke (in the 1961 episode “A Man and A Day” & the 1964 episode “Run Sheep, Run”), Perry Mason (1962 episode “The Case of the Crippled Cougar”), and a recurring role on Petticoat Junction. His final acting credit was the 1977 science fiction horror film, Empire of the Ants, starring Joan Collins.

== Death ==
Fadden died of natural causes on April 14, 1980, in Vero Beach, Florida.

== Filmography ==
(Per AFI database)

- Destry Rides Again (1939) as Lem Claggett
- I Stole a Million (1939) as Verne
- Congo Maisie (1940) as Nelson
- The Man from Dakota (1940) as Wagon Driver (uncredited)
- Winners of the West (1940, Serial) as Tex Houston
- The Captain Is a Lady (1940) as Pucey Kintner
- Zanzibar (1940) as Rhad Ramsey
- Kiss the Boys Goodbye (1941) as Deputy (uncredited)
- Look Who's Laughing (1941) as Pete, Milkman (uncredited)
- The Shepherd of the Hills (1941) as Jim Lane
- Blondie Goes to College (1942) as Mrs. Dill's Brother (uncredited)
- The Glass Key (1942) as Basement Club Waiter (uncredited)
- Henry Aldrich, Editor (1942) as News Vendor (uncredited)
- The Lone Star Ranger (1942) as Sam
- My Favorite Blonde (1942) as Tom Douglas
- The Night Before the Divorce (1942) as Captain Walt
- The Postman Didn't Ring (1942) as Postman (uncredited)
- The Remarkable Andrew (1942) as Jake Pearl
- Right to the Heart (1942)
- Sundown Jim (1942) as Stagecoach Driver
- Wings for the Eagle (1942) as Tom 'Cyclone' Shaw
- Pardon My Sarong (1942) as Sven (uncredited)
- Edge of Darkness (1943) as Hammer (uncredited)
- Fall In (1943) as Zeb Hatfield (uncredited)
- Frontier Badmen (1943) as Cattleman Thompson (uncredited)
- The Good Fellows (1943) as Harvey
- A Lady Takes a Chance (1943) as Mullen
- Northern Pursuit (1943) as Hobby (uncredited)
- The Hairy Ape (1944) as Long
- In Society (1944) as Fire Chief (uncredited)
- Henry Aldrich's Little Secret (1944) as Mr.Luther
- Three Little Sisters (1944) as Ambrose Pepperdine
- Tomorrow, the World! (1944) as Mr. Clyde - Mailman (uncredited)
- The Thin Man Goes Home (1944) as Train Passenger in Passageway (uncredited)
- Escape in the Desert (1945) as Joe, Citizen Gunman (uncredited)
- Incendiary Blonde (1945) as Potato Farmer (uncredited)
- A Medal for Benny (1945) as Eddie Krinch (uncredited)
- Murder, He Says (1945) as Sheriff Murdock (uncredited)
- The Naughty Nineties (1945) as Wounded Gambler (uncredited)
- Out of This World (1945)
- State Fair (1945) as Eph (uncredited)
- That Night with You (1945) as Milkman (uncredited)
- Trail to Vengeance (1945) as Horace Glumm
- The Big Sleep (1946) as Sidney (uncredited)
- Dragonwyck (1946) as Otto Gebhardt - Farmer (uncredited)
- A Stolen Life (1946) as Fisherman (uncredited)
- The Strange Love of Martha Ivers (1946) as Cab Driver (uncredited)
- The Well Groomed Bride (1946) as Justice (uncredited)
- It's a Wonderful Life (1946) as Toll House Keeper (uncredited)
- Cross My Heart (1946) as Truck Driver (uncredited)
- California (1947) as Stranger (uncredited)
- Cheyenne (1947) as Charlie
- Dark Passage (1947) as Diner Counterman Serving Parry (uncredited)
- Dragnet (1947) as Amos Wright
- Easy Come, Easy Go (1947) as Sanitation Man (uncredited)
- Magic Town (1947) as Soda Jerk (uncredited)
- Pursued (1947) as The Minister (uncredited)
- That Hagen Girl (1947) as Village Loafer
- B. F.'s Daughter (1948) as S.Z. Holmquist, 4 Forks, Minnesota (uncredited)
- The Dude Goes West (1948) as J.J. Hines (uncredited)
- The Hunted (1948) as Hayseed Bus Passenger (uncredited)
- The Inside Story (1948) as Ab Follansbee
- Moonrise (1948) as Homer Blackstone
- A Miracle Can Happen (1948) as Sheriff's Deputy (uncredited)
- Panhandle (1948) as Mac - Horse Seller (uncredited)
- Raw Deal (1948) as Grimshaw (uncredited)
- State of the Union (1948) as Waiter
- Whispering Smith (1948) as Telegrapher at Coyete Creek (uncredited)
- Bad Men of Tombstone (1949) as Joe (uncredited)
- Big Jack (1949) as Sheriff Summers (uncredited)
- The Judge Steps Out (1949) as Sheriff (uncredited)
- Dallas (1950) as Mountaineer (uncredited)
- Devil's Doorway (1950) as Bob Trammell (uncredited)
- Singing Guns (1950) as Express Agent
- Riding High (1950) as Whitehall's Trainer (uncredited)
- Vengeance Valley (1951) as Obie Rune (uncredited)
- Drums in the Deep South (1951) as Purdy
- Toughest Man in Arizona (1952) as Undertaker (uncredited)
- The Lawless Breed (1953) as Chick Noonan - Undertaker
- Kansas Pacific (1953) as Gus Gustavson
- Thy Neighbor's Wife (1953) as Honza Kratky
- Many Rivers to Cross (1955) as Rafe (uncredited)
- Prince of Players (1955) as Actor as Trenchard (uncredited)
- The Tall Men (1955) as Hank the Livery Stable Owner (uncredited)
- Invasion of the Body Snatchers (1956) as Uncle Ira Lentz
- Baby Face Nelson (1957) as Postman Harkins
- Edge of Eternity (1959) as Eli Jones
- Toby Tyler (1960) as Uncle Daniel
- Flaming Star (1960) as Man #1 at Crossing (uncredited)
- Pocketful of Miracles (1961) as Herbie - Hotel Employee (uncredited)
- Paradise Alley (1962) as Mr. Nicholson
- Flareup (1969) as Mr. Willows
- Dirty Dingus Magee (1970) as Trooper #1
- Empire of the Ants (1977) as Sam Russell
