= Law and Order (1940 film) =

1940 film

- Directed by: Ray Taylor
- Written by: Sherman L. Lowe; Victor McLeod
- Based on: Saint Johnson by W. R. Burnett
- Produced by: Joseph Gershenson
- Starring: Johnny Mack Brown; Nell O'Day; James Craig
- Cinematography: Jerome Ash
- Edited by: Edward Curtiss
- Music by: Hans J. Salter
- Production company: Universal Pictures
- Distributed by: Universal Pictures
- Release date: November 28, 1940
- Running time: 57 minutes
- Country: United States
- Language: English

Law and Order is a 1940 American Western film directed by Ray Taylor and starring Johnny Mack Brown, Nell O'Day and James Craig. It was produced as a second feature by Universal Pictures. Shooting took place at Universal Studios and the Iverson Ranch. The film's sets were designed by the art director Jack Otterson.

== Plot summary ==
Bill Ralston arrives in town planning to settle down but quickly gets caught up in the fight between the townspeople and Poe Daggett and his gang. He takes the job of town Marshal and soon brings law and order. When Daggett's men ambush him, Ralston kills Poe's brother. Poe then kills Bill's friend Brant and this leads to the showdown.

== Cast ==
- Johnny Mack Brown as Bill Ralston
- Fuzzy Knight as Deadwood
- Nell O'Day as Sally Dixon
- James Craig as Brant
- Harry Cording as Poe Daggett
- Earle Hodgins as Sheriff Fin Elder
- Robert Fiske as Ed Deal
- Jimmie Dodd as Jimmy Dixon
- William Worthington as Judge Williams
- Ted Adams as Walt Daggett
- Ethan Laidlaw as Kurt Daggett
- George Plues as Stage Driver
- Harry Humphrey as Cal Dixon
- Kermit Maynard as Henchman
- Eddie Polo as Bartender Ed
- Lew Meehan as Voting Official
- Bob Kortman as Henchman Pete

== Bibliography ==
- Pitts, Michael R. Western Movies: A Guide to 5,105 Feature Films. McFarland, 2012.
