= Howard Freeman =

American actor (1899–1967)

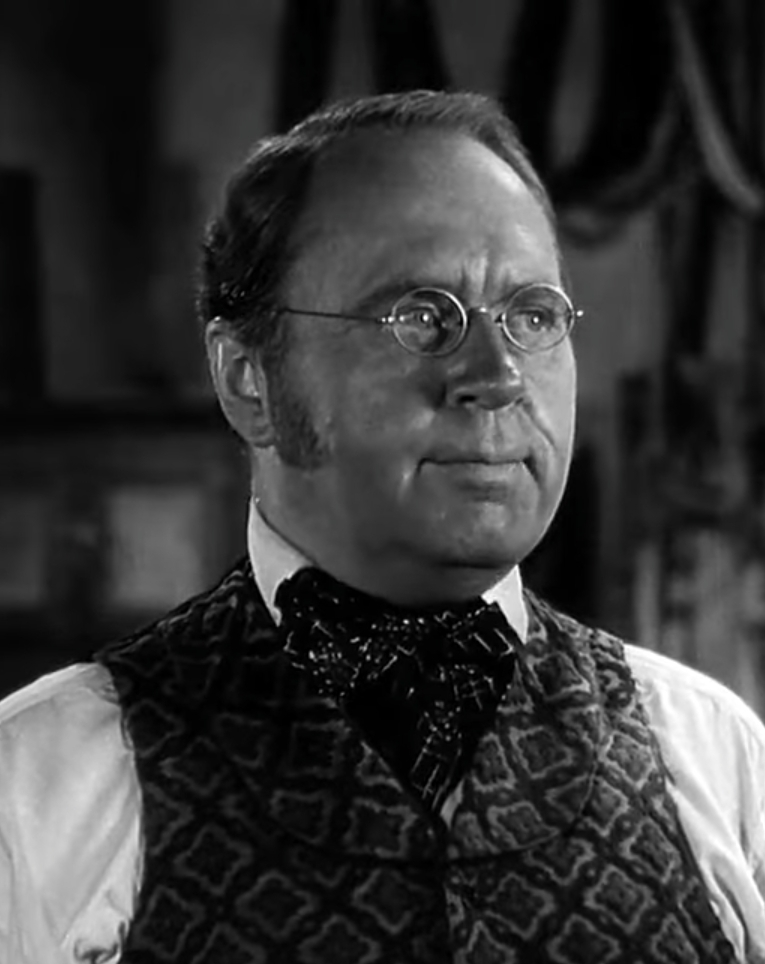
- Freeman in Abilene Town (1946)
- Born: December 9, 1902; Helena, Montana, U.S.
- Died: December 11, 1967 (aged 65); New York City, New York, U.S.
- Occupation: Actor
- Years active: 1937–1965

Howard Freeman (December 9, 1902 – December 11, 1967) was an American actor of the early 20th century, and film and television actor of the 1940s through the 1960s.

== Biography ==
Freeman was born in Helena, Montana, and began working as a stage actor in his 20s. He did not enter the film industry until he was over 40, in 1942, when he played a small uncredited role in Inflation. Despite his late start in film acting, Freeman would build himself a fairly substantial career in that field that would last over twenty three years. From 1943 onward he worked on a regular basis, sometimes in uncredited roles, but more often than not in small but credited bit or supporting parts. He appeared in ten films in 1943, and another eighteen from 1944 through 1945. In 1946 Freeman would appear in twelve films, the most notable of which was his first film of that year, Abilene Town, starring Randolph Scott and Lloyd Bridges, and California, starring Barbara Stanwyck and Ray Milland.

From 1947 through 1950 Freeman appeared in twenty films, and in 1951 he began appearing on numerous television series, which would be his main acting roles for the remainder of his career, lasting into 1965. He appeared in three episodes of Studio One, along with many other TV series, including Car 54, Where Are You? and Route 66. He retired from film and television acting in 1965, and settled into retirement in New York City, where he was living at the time of his death on December 11, 1967.

== Broadway roles ==
- The Star-Wagon (1937) as Apfel
- Knickerbocker Holiday (1938) as Schermerhorn
- The Unconquered (1940) as Karp Morozov
- Liliom (1940) (revival) as policeman and as the richly dressed man

== Selected filmography ==
- Margin for Error (1943) as Otto Horst
- The Human Comedy (1943) as Reverend Holly (uncredited)
- Slightly Dangerous (1943) as Mr. Quill
- Air Raid Wardens (1943) as J. P. Norton
- Hitler's Madman (1943) as Heinrich Himmler
- Pilot #5 (1943) as Governor Hank Durban
- Girl Crazy (1943) as Governor Tait
- Whistling in Brooklyn (1943) as Steve Conlon
- Madame Curie (1943) as Prof. Constant (voice, uncredited)
- Lost Angel (1943) as Professor Richards
- Rationing (1944) as Cash Riddle
- Once Upon a Time (1944) as McKenzie (uncredited)
- Meet the People (1944) as Mr. George Peetwick
- Mr. Winkle Goes to War (1944) as Mayor Williams (uncredited)
- Secret Command (1944) as Max Lessing
- The Mark of the Whistler (1944) as M. K. Simmons (uncredited)
- An American Romance (1944) as Jarrett's Associate (uncredited)
- The Unwritten Code (1944) as Mr. Norris
- Dancing in Manhattan (1944) as George Hartley
- Carolina Blues (1944) as Tom Gordon
- Meet Miss Bobby Socks (1944) as Tom Tyler
- A Song to Remember (1945) as Kalkbrenner
- Where Do We Go from Here? (1945) as Kreiger
- I'll Tell the World (1945) as Lester Westchester
- You Came Along (1945) as Drunk
- That Night with You (1945) as Wilbur Weedy
- This Love of Ours (1945) as Dr. Barnes
- Mexicana (1945) as Beagle
- Abilene Town (1946) as Ed Balder
- House of Horrors (1946) as Hal Ormiston
- The Blue Dahlia (1946) as Corelli
- So Goes My Love (1946) as Willis
- Inside Job (1946) as Mr. Winkle
- Night and Day (1946) as Max Fisher (uncredited)
- The Killers (1946) as Brentwood Police Chief (uncredited)
- Monsieur Beaucaire (1946) as King Philip II
- Swell Guy (1946) as Botsworth (uncredited)
- Susie Steps Out (1946) as Mr. Starr
- Cross My Heart (1946) as Wallace Brent
- California (1947) as Sen. Creel
- The Perfect Marriage (1947) as Peter Haggerty
- My Brother Talks to Horses (1947) as Hector Damson
- Easy Come, Easy Go (1947) as Magistrate (uncredited)
- Cigarette Girl (1947) as B. J. Halstead
- That Way with Women (1947) as Dr. Harvey
- The Long Night (1947) as Sheriff Ned Meade
- Magic Town (1947) as Nickleby
- Cass Timberlane (1947) as Hervey Plint
- If You Knew Susie (1948) as Mr. Clinton
- Summer Holiday (1948) as Mr. Peabody
- Arthur Takes Over (1948) as Bert Bixby
- Letter from an Unknown Woman (1948) as Herr Kastner
- Up in Central Park (1948) as Myron Schultz
- The Time of Your Life (1948) as Society Gentleman
- Give My Regards to Broadway (1948) as Mr. Waldron
- Cry of the City (1948) as Sullivan the Drunk (uncredited)
- The Girl from Manhattan (1948) as Sam Griffin
- The Snake Pit (1948) as Dr. Curtis
- Take One False Step (1949) as Dr. Markheim
- Chicago Deadline (1949) as Hotspur Shaner
- Perfect Strangers (1950) as Arthur Timkin
- Here Comes the Groom (1951) as Governor
- Double Dynamite (1951) as R. B. Pulsifer Sr.
- Scaramouche (1952) as Michael Vanneau
- The Turning Point (1952) as Fogel
- Million Dollar Mermaid (1952) as Aldrich
- Remains to Be Seen (1953) as Clark
- Raiders of the Seven Seas (1953) as Mayor Pompaño
- Dear Brigitte (1965) as Dean Sawyer
