= James Craig (actor) =

American actor (1912–85)

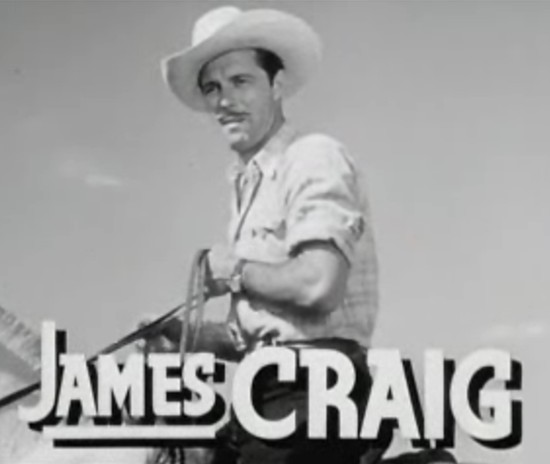
- Craig in Boys' Ranch (1946)
- Born: James Henry Meador; February 4, 1912; Nashville, Tennessee, U.S.
- Died: June 27, 1985 (aged 73); Santa Ana, California, U.S.
- Other name: James Mead
- Occupation: Film actor
- Years active: 1937–1972
- Spouse(s): Yorick Veenma (1958); Jil Jarmyn (1959–1962; divorced); Sumie Jossi (1969–1980); Mary June Ray (?-?)
- Children: 3

James Craig (born James Henry Meador, February 4, 1912 - June 27, 1985) was an American actor. He is best known for appearances in films like Kitty Foyle (1940) and The Devil and Daniel Webster (1941), and his stint as a leading man at Metro-Goldwyn-Mayer in the 1940s where he appeared in films like The Human Comedy (1943).

== Biography ==
James Henry Meador was born on February 4, 1912, in Nashville, Tennessee and studied at the Rice Institute (now Rice University), planning a career in medicine. After graduation, he worked as a professional football player and a debt collector. After visiting Hollywood, he decided to become an actor. He returned home and worked in theatre for a year, then went back to Hollywood. He did a screen test for Paramount, which offered him a contract.

=== Paramount ===
He began appearing in films at Paramount, originally using the name James Mead. He appeared mostly in B-movies and serials. His early credits included Sophie Lang Goes West (1937), This Way Please (1937), Thunder Trail (1937), Born to the West (1937), The Buccaneer (1938), The Big Broadcast of 1938 (1938), and Swing, Teacher, Swing (1938). He was in Pride of the West (1938).

Craig left Hollywood and went to New York. He appeared on Broadway in Missouri Legend (1938), which re-ignited Hollywood's interest in him.

=== Columbia ===
Craig tested for the role of Rhett Butler in Gone with the Wind and had the lead in North of Shanghai (1939) for Columbia.

He was in The Lone Wolf's Daughter (1939) and the serial Flying G-Men (1939). He was in Blondie Meets the Boss (1939), Romance of the Redwoods (1939), Blind Alley (1939), Outside These Walls (1939), and Missing Daughters (1939). He was in a Buster Keaton short, Pest from the West (1939), then Good Girls Go to Paris (1939) and the serial Overland with Kit Carson (1939). He did a short with Andy Clyde, Trouble Finds Andy Clyde (1939), then Behind Prison Gates (1939), The Man They Could Not Hang (1939), and Konga (1939).

Craig was in some Charley Chase shorts, Skinny the Moocher (1939) and Static in the Attic (1939). After A Woman Is the Judge (1939) he appeared in the Three Stooges film Oily to Bed, Oily to Rise. Craig followed this with Taming of the West (1939), Scandal Sheet (1939), Forestalled (1939), and Cafe Hostess (1940).

=== Universal ===
Craig signed with Universal in November 1939. The studio announced it wanted to build him into a leading man. He had a support role in Black Friday (1940), then he did The House Across the Bay (1940) for Walter Wanger.

He returned to Universal for Zanzibar (1940), where he had the male lead. He was down the cast list for Secret Enemy (1940), and the serial Winners of the West (1940) but had a lead part in South to Karanga (1940). Craig had smaller parts in I'm Nobody's Sweetheart Now (1940), Seven Sinners (1940), and Lucky Ralston (1940).

=== RKO ===
Craig's big break happened when RKO bought out his contract with Universal to play one of Ginger Rogers' suitors in Kitty Foyle (1940). This was a big hit.

RKO gave him the romantic lead in Unexpected Uncle (1941), and he played a New Hampshire farmer who sells his soul in All That Money Can Buy, also titled The Devil and Daniel Webster (1941), with Walter Huston and Edward Arnold.

He appeared with Lucille Ball in an RKO Western, Valley of the Sun (1942). Edward Small cast him in Friendly Enemies (1942), supporting Charles Ruggles and Charles Winninger.

=== MGM ===
Louis B. Mayer, head of Metro-Goldwyn-Mayer, thought Craig resembled the studio's most popular male star Clark Gable. Mayer signed Craig to a seven-year contract to potentially fill in for Gable when he enlisted in the United States Army Air Forces.

MGM started off Craig as the lead in some B Westerns, The Omaha Trail (1942) and Northwest Rangers (1942). The latter was a remake of Manhattan Melodrama with Craig playing the role played by Gable in the original. Both films lost money.

Craig went back to RKO for Seven Miles from Alcatraz (1942) then did a naval propaganda short, Freedom Comes High.

MGM launched Craig as a star in The Human Comedy (1943), which was a massive success. He was Ann Sothern's love interest in Swing Shift Maisie (1943) and supported Margaret O'Brien in Lost Angel (1943).

In 1944, Craig co-starred with William Powell and Hedy Lamarr in The Heavenly Body. That year exhibitors voted him the second most likely to be a "star of tomorrow".

Craig supported Ronald Colman in Kismet (1944), and Lana Turner in Marriage Is a Private Affair (1944); the latter was a big hit. Craig was given the star role in Gentle Annie (1945) and Dangerous Partners (1945); he was reunited with Margaret O'Brien in Our Vines Have Tender Grapes (1945).

Craig starred in She Went to the Races (1945), and two with Butch Jenkins, Boys' Ranch (1946) and Little Mister Jim (1947), which both lost money. Craig replaced Van Johnson in the final film of the Dr. Kildare series. The film, Dark Delusion (1947), lost money.

Craig was loaned to Eagle Lion to appear in The Man from Texas (1948). Eagle Lion borrowed him again for Northwest Stampede (1948) then he went back to MGM to play the villain in Side Street (1949). It flopped as did A Lady Without Passport (1950), where Craig supported Lamarr and John Hodiak, and The Strip (1951) with Mickey Rooney.

Craig had the lead in a Western, Drums in the Deep South (1951), for the King Brothers and RKO. He supported Yvonne De Carlo in Hurricane Smith (1952). He wrote the script for the Western Scorching Fury (1952). The Los Angeles Times noted that Craig's MGM contract "seems to go on and on... notwithstanding he only seems to appear in the company's films at well-spaced intervals."

Walter Wanger gave him the lead in Fort Vengeance (1953). He supported in Code Two (1953) for MGM. In 1953 his $2,500 a week contract with MGM ended.

=== Later career ===
Craig began appearing on TV in "The Westerner" for Chevron Theatre and Studio 57 and "Wedding March" for Ford Television Theatre. He did "Dead Reckoning" for Science Fiction Theatre (1955).

Craig returned to features with Last of the Desperados (1955), where he had the lead, and While the City Sleeps (1956), which he had a support role. He could be seen in starring roles in B films like The Women of Pitcairn Island (1956), Shoot-Out at Medicine Bend (1957) with Randolph Scott, The Persuader (1957), The Cyclops (1957) for Bert I. Gordon, Naked in the Sun (1957), Ghost Diver (1957), Man or Gun (1958) and Four Fast Guns (1960).

He guest starred on shows like The Millionaire (1956), Broken Arrow (1957), Have Gun – Will Travel as Ralph Coe in S1 E26 "Birds of a Feather" (1958), Colgate Theatre (1958), Death Valley Days (1960), and Tales of Wells Fargo (1962).

=== B films ===
Craig went to Japan for The Revenge of Doctor X (1967), also known as Venus Flytrap. He had support roles in Hostile Guns (1967), Fort Utah (1967) and Arizona Bushwhackers (1968) and guest starred in Daniel Boone, Custer, and The Virginian

Craig could also be seen in The Devil's Brigade (1968), If He Hollers, Let Him Go! (1968), Bigfoot (1970), and The Tormentors (1971).

Both his last film and television performance came in 1972: he played Dr. Hainer in the sci-fi movie Doomsday Machine and John Rodman on The ABC Afternoon Playbreak episode "This Child Is Mine".

== Personal life ==
Craig was married to Mary June Ray (from 1939 to 1954), Jil Jarmyn (married 1959, divorced 1963)) Jane Valentine 1963-1964, and Sumie Jassi; each union ended in divorce.

Craig's first wife claimed he hit her. In 1963, a judge issued an arrest warrant to Craig for refusing to attend a divorce hearing involving his second wife Jane. He turned himself in and successfully argued for his release. Jane alleged he had broken into their home, beaten her and cut up her clothes; she also alleged he had a problem with drinking. In 1967 Jane killed her eleven year old son by a previous marriage, then committed suicide.

Craig had two sons, Robert and James Jr., and a daughter; one of the sons predeceased him.

During his 1954 divorce hearing, Craig revealed he made money from a variety of sources in addition to acting, including race horses, a cafe, a chicken ranch, and carpentry.

After retiring from acting in 1972, Craig became a real estate agent.

== Death ==
Craig died of lung cancer at Western Medical Center in Tustin, California, in 1985. He was 73.

== Selected filmography ==
- Sophie Lang Goes West (1937) – Waiter (uncredited)
- This Way Please (1937) – Soldier (uncredited)
- Thunder Trail (1937) – Bob Tate
- Born to the West (1937) – Brady (uncredited)
- The Buccaneer (1938) – Victory Ball Creole Guest (uncredited)
- The Big Broadcast of 1938 (1938) – Steward (uncredited)
- College Swing (1938) – Student (uncredited)
- Pride of the West (1938) – Nixon
- North of Shanghai (1939) – Jed Howard
- The Lone Wolf Spy Hunt (1939) – Party Guest (uncredited)
- Flying G-Men (1939, Serial) – John Cummings
- Blondie Meets the Boss (1939) – (uncredited)
- Romance of the Redwoods (1939) – Logger (uncredited)
- Blind Alley (1939) – Party Guest (uncredited)
- Outside These Walls (1939) – Reporter (uncredited)
- Missing Daughters (1939) – 1st Attendant (uncredited)
- Good Girls Go to Paris (1939) – Party Guest (uncredited)
- Overland with Kit Carson (1939) – Trapper Tennessee
- Behind Prison Gates (1939) – Jenkins (uncredited)
- The Man They Could Not Hang (1939) – Juror Watkins
- Konga, the Wild Stallion (1939) – Ed (uncredited)
- A Woman Is the Judge (1939) – Detective (uncredited)
- Oily to Bed, Oily to Rise (1939 The Three Stooges) – Swindler Driving Car (uncredited)
- The Taming of the West (1939) – Handy Clem – Henchman
- Scandal Sheet (1939) – Mann
- Two-Fisted Rangers (1939) – Saloon Gambler (uncredited)
- Cafe Hostess (1940) – Rocky (uncredited)
- Black Friday (1940) – Reporter Ernst Gives Notes To (uncredited)
- The House Across the Bay (1940) – Brenda's Friend (uncredited)
- Zanzibar (1940) – Steve Marland
- Enemy Agent (1940) – Federal Agent Posing as Drunk (uncredited)
- Winners of the West (1940, Serial) – Jim Jackson
- South to Karanga (1940) – Steve Hawley
- I'm Nobody's Sweetheart Now (1940) – Ray
- Seven Sinners (1940) – Ensign #1
- Law and Order (1940) – Brant
- Kitty Foyle (1940) – Mark Eisen
- Unexpected Uncle (1941) – Johnny Kerrigan
- The Devil and Daniel Webster (1941) – Jabez Stone
- Valley of the Sun (1942) – Jonathan Ware
- Friendly Enemies (1942) – Bill Pfeiffer
- The Omaha Trail (1942) – Pat Candel
- Northwest Rangers (1942) – Frank 'Blackie' Marshall
- Seven Miles from Alcatraz (1942) – Champ Larkin
- The Human Comedy (1943) – Tom Spangler
- Swing Shift Maisie (1943) – 'Breezy' McLaughlin
- Lost Angel (1943) – Mike Regan
- The Heavenly Body (1944) – Lloyd X. Hunter
- Kismet (1944) – Caliph
- Marriage Is a Private Affair (1944) – Capt. Miles Lancing
- Gentle Annie (1944) – Lloyd Richland aka Rich Williams
- Dangerous Partners (1945) – Jeff Caighn
- Our Vines Have Tender Grapes (1945) – Nels Halverson
- She Went to the Races (1945) – Steve Canfield
- Boys' Ranch (1946) – Dan Walker
- Little Mister Jim (1947) – Capt. Big Jim Tukker
- Dark Delusion (1947) – Dr. Tommy Coalt
- The Man from Texas (1948) – Tobias Simms, alias Toby Heath
- Northwest Stampede (1948) – Dan Bennett
- Side Street (1949) – Georgie Garsell
- A Lady Without Passport (1950) – Chief Frank Westlake, INS
- The Strip (1951) – Delwyn 'Sonny' Johnson
- Drums in the Deep South (1951) – Maj. Clay Clayburn
- Hurricane Smith (1952) – Gorvahlsen
- Fort Vengeance (1953) – Dick Ross
- Code Two (1953) – Police Lt. Redmon
- Last of the Desperados (1955) – Sheriff Pat Garrett
- Massacre (1956) – Teniente Ezparza
- While the City Sleeps (1956) – 'Honest' Harry Kritzer
- The Women of Pitcairn Island (1956) – Capt. Jeb Page
- Shoot-Out at Medicine Bend (1957) – Ep Clark
- The Persuader (1957) – Bick Justin
- The Cyclops (1957) – Russ Bradford
- Naked in the Sun (1957) – Chief Osceola
- Ghost Diver (1957) – Roger Bristol
- Man or Gun (1958) – Pinch Corley
- Four Fast Guns (1960) – Tom Sabin
- Hostile Guns (1967) – Ned Cooper
- Fort Utah (1967) – Bo Greer
- Arizona Bushwhackers (1968) – Ike Clanton
- The Devil's Brigade (1968) – Major General Knapp
- If He Hollers, Let Him Go! (1968) – Police Chief
- Bigfoot (1970) – Cyrus
- The Revenge of Dr. X (1970) – Dr. Bragan
- The Tormentors (1971)
- Doomsday Machine (1972) – Dr. Haines (final film role)

== Radio appearances ==
Year	Program	Episode/source
1943	Lady Esther Screen Guild Theatre	Men in White
