= Little Mister Jim =

1946 film by Fred Zinnemann

- Directed by: Fred Zinnemann
- Screenplay by: George Bruce
- Based on: Army Brat by Tommy Wadelton
- Produced by: Orville O. Dull
- Starring: Butch Jenkins; James Craig; Frances Gifford
- Cinematography: Lester White
- Edited by: Frank E. Hull
- Music by: George Bassman
- Production company: Metro-Goldwyn-Mayer
- Distributed by: Loew's Inc.
- Release date: June 10, 1946
- Running time: 92 minutes
- Country: United States
- Language: English
- Budget: $1,085,000
- Box office: $787,000

Little Mister Jim is a 1946 American drama film directed by Fred Zinnemann and starring Butch Jenkins, James Craig and Frances Gifford.

== Plot ==
Army captain "Big Jim" Tukker has a young son, Little Jim, who runs away from home. Once found, the unhappy boy is cheered by the news that he will soon be getting a new baby brother or sister. But when his mother dies in childbirth, his father takes to drinking, neglecting him.

Others intervene on the boy's behalf, including Sui Jen, the family servant. Efforts to shake Big Jim out of his depression fail until Sui Jen begins teaching the child Chinese philosophy and faith, going so far as to dress him in Chinese apparel. The boy's father realizes he must take a more personal interest in parenting, then discovers, to his astonishment, that Sui Jen is actually an officer in the Chinese army.

== Cast ==
- James Craig as Capt. Tukker
- Butch Jenkins as Little Jim
- Frances Gifford as Jean
- Laura La Plante as Mrs. Glenson
- Spring Byington as Mrs. Starwell
- Morris Ankrum as Mr. Starwell
- Chingwah Lee as Sui Jen
- Celia Travers as Miss Martin
- Luana Patten as Missey

== Production ==
Parts of the film were shot in Fort Douglas, Utah.

== Reception ==
According to MGM records the film was not a hit, earning $533,000 in the US and Canada and $254,000 elsewhere, making a loss to the studio of $640,000.
