= Flying G-Men =

1939 film by Ray Taylor, James W. Horne

- Film poster
- Directed by: James W. Horne; Ray Taylor
- Written by: Robert E. Kent; Basil Dickey; Sherman L. Lowe
- Produced by: Larry Darmour
- Starring: Robert Paige; Richard Fiske; James Craig; Lorna Gray
- Cinematography: Benjamin H. Kline
- Edited by: Richard Fantl
- Music by: Morris Stoloff; Sidney Cutner
- Color process: Black and white
- Distributed by: Columbia Pictures
- Release date: February 2, 1939
- Running time: 15 chapters (300 min)
- Country: United States
- Language: English

Flying G-Men is a 15-episode 1939 adventure film Film serial, directed by James W. Horne and Ray Taylor. The serial was the sixth of the 57 serials released by Columbia. Four "Flying G-Men" battle with enemy saboteurs intent on destroying American military defences.

== Plot ==
Three government aviators, Hal Andrews, Bart Davis and John Cummings called the "Flying G-Men", one of whom is disguised as "The Black Falcon", fight to protect the United States and its allies from an enemy spy ring and to avenge the death of the fourth Flying G-Man, Charles Bronson.

Bronson was killed when he attempted to stop enemy agents from stealing the new McKay military aircraft, designed by Billy McKay. The Junior Air Defenders are also enlisted to help the Flying G-Men.

A plot to infiltrate all military factories and airports is discovered but the spy chief called "The Professor" is unknown. Suspecting Marvin Brewster, the owner of Brewster Airport, a local airfield, is The Professor, the G-Men find that he has kidnapped Babs McKay. They follow him to the spy hideout to capture Brewster and rescue Babs.

== Chapter titles ==
1. Challenge in the Sky
2. Flight of the Condemned
3. The Vulture's Nest
4. The Falcon Strikes
5. Flight from Death
6. Phantom of the Sky
7. Trapped by Radio
8. The Midnight Watch
9. Wings of Terror
10. Flaming Wreckage
11. While a Nation Sleeps
12. Sealed Orders
13. Flame Island
14. Jaws of Death
15. The Falcon's Reward

_{Source:}

== Cast ==
- Robert Paige as Hal Andrews, Flying G-Man, and "The Black Falcon"
- Richard Fiske as Bart Davis, Flying G-Man
- James Craig as John Cummings, Flying G-Man
- Lorna Gray as Babs McKay (Note: Lorna Gray was later known as Adrian Booth.)
- Sammy McKim as Billy McKay
- Stanley Brown as Charles Bronson, Flying G-Man
- Don Beddoe as W. S. Hamilton
- Forbes Murray as Marvin Brewster and The Professor, the villainous owner of a local airport
- Lee Prather as Simmons
- Beatrice Blinn as Brewster's secretary
- Ann Doran as Hamilton's secretary
- Dick Curtis as Korman, a henchman
- Eddie Laughton as Hall, a henchman
- John Tyrrell as Williams
- Eddie Fetherston as Borden, a geologist

== Production ==
Flying G-Men had the services of noted aerial stunt pilot and cinematographer Paul Mantz who flew a Lockheed Sirius and Ryan ST. Mantz was a prolific Hollywood "stunt" pilot, although he preferred to call himself a "precision pilot".

== Reception ==
Film reviewer Jerry Blake in The Files of Jerry Blake described Flying G-Men serial as "... the least interesting of Columbia’s five in-house serial productions (the other four being 'Great Adventures of Wild Bill Hickok', 'The Spider's Web', 'Overland With Kit Carson', and 'Mandrake the Magician') ... its action scenes are uneven, its lead villains weak, and its plotting often disjointed. However, it remains watchable and enjoyable throughout, thanks to an extremely likeable group of heroes and an unfailingly fast pace."

According to many serial and comics historians, the Black Falcon character is a precursor to Blackhawk, including author William Schoell who said, "It is hard not to notice the resemblance between the Black Falcon and comic books' Blackhawk, but the latter character did not actually appear until 1941 [Columbia Pictures did a serial version of Blackhawk in 1952], meaning the Black Falcon came first."

== See also ==
- List of American films of 1939
- List of film serials by year
- List of film serials by studio

| Preceded by The Spider's Web (1938) | Columbia Serial; Flying G-Men (1939) | Succeeded by Mandrake the Magician (1939) |
