= Hurricane Smith (1952 film) =

1952 film by Jerry Hopper

- Directed by: Jerry Hopper
- Screenplay by: Frank Gruber
- Based on: Hurricane Williams (novel) by Gordon Ray Young
- Produced by: Nat Holt
- Starring: Yvonne De Carlo; John Ireland; James Craig; Forrest Tucker; Lyle Bettger; Richard Arlen
- Cinematography: Ray Rennahan
- Edited by: Frank Bracht
- Music by: Paul Sawtell
- Color process: Technicolor
- Production company: Nat Holt Productions
- Distributed by: Paramount Pictures
- Release date: October 3, 1952 (New York)
- Running time: 90 minutes
- Country: United States
- Language: English
- Box office: $1,175,000 (U.S. rentals)

Hurricane Smith is a 1952 American adventure film directed by Jerry Hopper and starring Yvonne De Carlo, John Ireland, James Craig, Forrest Tucker, Lyle Bettger and Richard Arlen.

== Plot ==
Captain Raikes of the ship The Southern Cross arrives on an island in the South Pacific Ocean to capture slaves. He rows ashore with his first mate Brown and other crew members, unaware that the island is inhabited by three white adventurers who have been stranded there: Hurricane Smith, Dan O'Hara and Brundage. The adventurers sneak aboard the ship, overwhelm the remaining crew, take command and set sail for Australia. Hurricane explains that he had buried $500,000 in Dakaru before being unfairly arrested for piracy. He persuades O'Hara and Brundage to become his partners in retrieving the money.

In Australia, the three men rename their ship The Lady Betty and try to raise money to find the treasure. They are approached by Eric Gorvahlsen, a scientist who wants to hire a ship. When Raikes and Brown arrive in Australia, Hurricane, Dan and Brundage take them prisoner on The Lady Betty.

Gorvahlsen boards the ship with his companions, Dr. Whitmore and Whitmore's half-Polynesian daughter Luana, who is also Gorvahlsen's lover. Gorvahlsen is planning to capture Hurricane's treasure on Dakaru. He thinks that Dan O'Hara is Hurricane, and the real Hurricane pretends to be named Jim Tyler. Luana and Hurricane fall in love and she admits to having doubts about the scheme.

Raikes and Brown have been released from the brig and start a knife fight with Brundage and another sailor named Clobb. After the fight, Raikes is returned to the brig. Luana falls in the water and Hurricane rescues her from a shark. Brundage accidentally calls Hurricane by his real name and Gorvahlsen notices. He orders Luana to drug Hurricane with gin, but she instead warns Hurricane, who swims to the island of Dakaru to prepare the natives for the attack.

Gorvahlsen orders Dan to anchor the ship by Dakaru. Brown persuades Gorvahlsen to join forces with him and to order Dan to release Raikes. Dan leaves for the island to warn Hurricane, who sneaks aboard the boat, but Brown has caused the crew to become unsettled. Hurricane is thrown in the brig and Clobb kills a sailor. Gorvahlsen takes command of the ship, and Clobb encourages the rest of the crew to arm themselves. Gorvahlsen tells the crew about the gold and convinces them to help him claim it.

In Dakaru, Hurricane is forced to lead Gorvahlsen, Brown and Raikes to the place where the gold has been buried. They dig and locate the treasure, but then Dan leads the natives to attack. Dr. Whitmore spears Gorvahlsen to death and Brundage kills Clobb in a knife fight. Hurricane and Luana are united.

== Cast ==
- Yvonne De Carlo as Luana Whitmore
- John Ireland as Hurricane Smith
- James Craig as Govahlsen
- Forrest Tucker as Dan McGuire
- Lyle Bettger as Clobb
- Richard Arlen as Brundage
- Mike Kellin as Dicer
- Murray Matheson as Dr. Whitmore
- Henry Brandon as Sam
- Emile Meyer as Capt. Raikes
- Stuart Randall as Matt Ward
- Ralph Dumke as Ben Hawkins
- Kim Spalding as Brown

== Production ==
The film is based on the 1922 novel Hurricane Williams by Gordon Ray Young. The character had previously appeared in a number of Young's stories, including Wild Blood (1921) and The Vengeance of Hurricane Williams (1926).

In 1951, producer Nat Holt announced that he had acquired the screen rights to the novel and had hired Frank Gruber, one of his regular screenwriters, to adapt it. Edmond O'Brien, who had recently starred in Silver City (1951) for Holt, was mentioned as a possible star. In August 1951, Holt announced that Paulette Goddard would star, with Sterling Hayden as a possible costar.

As Paramount was facing a backlog of films, production was delayed until February 1952. The film features Kanaka workers as extras, but their skin color was deemed too light, so it was darkened by the film's makeup man.

== Reception ==
In a contemporary review for The New York Times, critic Bosley Crowther called the film a "foaming item" and wrote: "Why be unreasonable about it? Everybody in the cast tries hard ... Miss DeCarlo softly ripples her muscles, a Hawaiian band plunks a dreamy tune and the Technicolor dazzles. The script? Well, it's just a little worn. And the direction of Jerry Hopper? Well, it's—by courtesy of Paramount."
