= Valley of the Sun (film) =

1942 film by George Marshall

- Theatrical release poster
- Directed by: George Marshall
- Screenplay by: Horace McCoy
- Based on: Valley of the Sun; 1940 serial story in The Saturday Evening Post by Clarence Budington Kelland
- Starring: Lucille Ball
- Cinematography: Harry J. Wild
- Edited by: Desmond Marquette
- Music by: Paul Sawtell
- Production company: RKO Radio Pictures
- Distributed by: RKO Radio Pictures
- Release date: February 6, 1942
- Running time: 78 minutes
- Country: United States
- Language: English
- Budget: $646,000

Valley of the Sun is a 1942 American Western film starring Lucille Ball and James Craig and directed by George Marshall . Cedric Hardwicke and Dean Jagger appear in support.

== Plot ==
In the Arizona Territory of 1868, a fugitive army scout and a crooked Indian Agent lock horns over the treatment of the cheated Native Americans and the affections of a local beauty.

== Cast ==
- Lucille Ball as Christine Larson
- James Craig as Jonathan Ware
- Cedric Hardwicke as Lord Warrick
- Dean Jagger as Jim Sawyer
- Peter Whitney as Willie
- Billy Gilbert as Judge Homer Burnaby
- Tom Tyler as Geronimo
- Antonio Moreno as Chief Cochise
- George Cleveland as Bill Yard
- Hank Bell as Hank - Shotgun Guard
