= My Brother Talks to Horses =

1947 film by Fred Zinnemann

- Directed by: Fred Zinnemann
- Written by: Morton Thompson
- Produced by: Samuel Marx
- Starring: Jackie "Butch" Jenkins; Peter Lawford; Beverly Tyler
- Cinematography: Harold Rosson
- Edited by: George White
- Music by: Rudolph G. Kopp
- Production company: Metro-Goldwyn-Mayer
- Distributed by: Loew's Inc.
- Release date: February 4, 1947
- Running time: 92 minutes
- Country: United States
- Language: English
- Budget: $1,436,000
- Box office: $976,000

My Brother Talks to Horses is a 1947 American comedy film directed by Fred Zinnemann, starring Jackie "Butch" Jenkins, Peter Lawford, and Beverly Tyler.

== Plot ==
Living with his family in Baltimore, 9-year-old Lewie Penrose (Butch Jenkins) claims that he can converse with horses, and also pick the winners of upcoming races. When it appears as though Lewie is telling the truth, he attracts the interest of gambler Rich Roeder (Charles Ruggles), who needs a "sure thing" in the upcoming Preakness Stakes. Meanwhile, Lewie's older brother John (Peter Lawford) carries on a romance with the lovely Martha (Beverly Tyler).

== Cast ==
- Jackie "Butch" Jenkins as Lewie Penrose
- Peter Lawford as John S. Penrose
- Beverly Tyler as Martha Sterling
- Edward Arnold as Mr. Bledsoe
- Charles Ruggles as Richard Pennington Roeder
- Spring Byington as Mrs. 'Ma' Penrose
- O.Z. Whitehead as Mr. Puddy
- Paul Langton as Mr. Gillespie
- Ernest Whitman as Mr. Mordecai
- Irving Bacon as Mr. Piper
- Lillian Yarbo as Psyche
- Howard Freeman as Hector Damson
- Harry Hayden as Mr. Gibley

== Reception ==
The film was not a success at the box office, earning $733,000 in the US and Canada and $243,000 elsewhere, resulting in a loss of $867,000.

== See also ==
- List of films about horses
- List of films about horse racing
