= Thunder Trail =

1937 film

- Theatrical release poster
- Directed by: Charles Barton
- Screenplay by: Robert Yost; Stuart Anthony
- Starring: Gilbert Roland; Charles Bickford; Marsha Hunt; J. Carrol Naish; James Craig; Monte Blue
- Cinematography: Karl Struss
- Edited by: John F. Link Sr.
- Production company: Paramount Pictures
- Distributed by: Paramount Pictures
- Release date: October 22, 1937
- Running time: 58 minutes
- Country: United States
- Language: English

Thunder Trail is a 1937 American Western film directed by Charles Barton, written by Robert Yost and Stuart Anthony, and starring Gilbert Roland, Charles Bickford, Marsha Hunt, J. Carrol Naish, James Craig and Monte Blue. The film, based on the Zane Grey story Arizona Ames, was released on October 22, 1937, by Paramount Pictures.

== Plot ==
Two brothers are the only survivors of a wagon train robbery, but get separated. Years later they reunite and help get the bandits' leader what he deserves.

== Cast ==
- Gilbert Roland as Arizona Dick Ames
- Charles Bickford as Lee Tate
- Marsha Hunt as Amy Morgan
- J. Carrol Naish as Rafael Lopez
- James Craig as Bob Tate
- Monte Blue as Jeff Graves
- Barlowe Borland as Jim Morgan
- Billy Lee as Bob at 8
- William Duncan as John Ames
- Gene Reynolds as Richard Ames at 14
