= Fort Vengeance =

1953 film by Lesley Selander

- Directed by: Lesley Selander
- Screenplay by: Daniel B. Ullmab
- Produced by: Walter Wanger
- Starring: James Craig; Rita Moreno; Keith Larsen
- Cinematography: Harry Neumann
- Edited by: Walter Hannemann
- Music by: Paul Dunlap
- Color process: Cinecolor
- Production company: Walter Wanger Productions
- Distributed by: Allied Artists Pictures
- Release dates: March 26, 1953 (Los Angeles); March 29, 1953 (United States)
- Running time: 75 minutes
- Country: United States
- Language: English

Fort Vengeance (aka Royal Mounted Police) is a 1953 American Western film directed by Lesley Selander and starring James Craig, Rita Moreno and Keith Larsen.

== Plot ==
Two North Dakota brothers flee to Canada and join the Canadian Mounties during an Indian dispute.

== Cast ==
- James Craig as Dick Ross
- Rita Moreno as Bridget Fitzgibbon
- Keith Larsen as Carey Ross
- Reginald Denny as Inspector Trevett
- Charles Irwin as Sgt. Saxon
- Morris Ankrum as Chief Blackfoot
- Guy Kingsford as Sgt. Major MacRea
- Michael Granger as Sitting Bull
- Patrick Whyte as Sgt. Major Harmington
- Paul Marion as Eagle Heart
- Emory Parnell as Patrick Fitzgibbon
