= Zanzibar (film) =

1940 film

- Directed by: Harold Schuster
- Written by: Maurice Tombragel; Maurice Wright
- Produced by: Warren Douglas; Ben Pivar
- Starring: James Craig; Lola Lane; Eduardo Ciannelli
- Cinematography: Milton R. Krasner
- Edited by: Milton Carruth
- Music by: Hans J. Salter
- Production company: Universal Pictures
- Distributed by: Universal Pictures
- Release date: March 8, 1940
- Running time: 70 mins
- Country: United States
- Language: English

Zanzibar is a 1940 American adventure film directed by Harold Schuster and starring James Craig, Lola Lane and Eduardo Ciannelli.

== Plot ==
An expedition in Africa seeks a mysterious skull.

== Cast ==
- Lola Lane as Jan Browning
- James Craig as Steve Marland
- Eduardo Ciannelli as Koski
- Tom Fadden as Rhad Ramsey
- Robert C. Fischer as The Sultan
- Henry Victor as Nate Simpson
- Clarence Muse as Bino
- Samuel S. Hinds as Dale
- Oscar O'Shea as Captain Craig
- Abner Biberman as Aba
- Lionel Pape as Michael Drayton
- Everett Brown as Umboga

== Production ==
James Craig had just signed a contract with Universal. Lola Lane had leapt to fame in Four Daughters (1938). The film was originally known as River of Missing Men and started filming in December 1939.
