= Boys' Ranch (film) =

1946 film by Roy Rowland

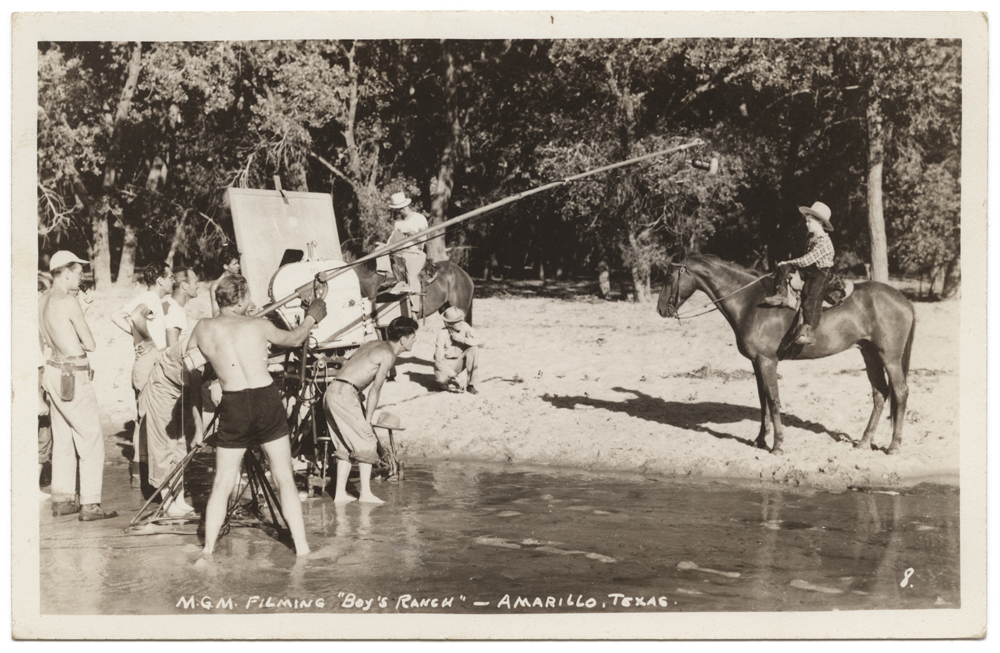
- Filming "Boys' Ranch". Amarillo, Texas.
- Directed by: Roy Rowland
- Written by: William Ludwig
- Based on: Boys Town, Ranch Style; 1946 story in American Magazine by Cal Farley
- Produced by: Robert Sisk
- Starring: Butch Jenkins; James Craig; Skippy Homeier; Dorothy Patrick
- Cinematography: Charles Salerno Jr.
- Edited by: Ralph E. Winters
- Music by: Nathaniel Shilkret
- Distributed by: Metro-Goldwyn-Mayer
- Release date: July 18, 1946
- Running time: 97 minutes
- Country: United States
- Language: English
- Budget: $1,155,000
- Box office: $1,502,000

Boys' Ranch is a 1946 American film about a fictional ex-professional baseball player, "Dan Walker", who starts a ranch in Texas for neglected and delinquent boys. Promoted by MGM as a successor to its award-winning Boys Town hit of 1938, the film is loosely based on ex-wrestler Cal Farley's Boys Ranch near Amarillo, Texas. The film was shot on location near Amarillo.

== Plot ==
Dan Walker, having retired from professional baseball, is concerned about the plight of neglected youth in his Texas town and persuades a group of community leaders to start a livestock ranch as a resident facility for troubled and neglected boys, to develop good character and self-reliance in a wholesome outdoor environment. The men urge Walker to run the ranch and wealthy landowner Davis Banton agrees to permit use of a portion of his property to set up the ranch on a provisional basis.

Two of the boys, "Hank" and "Skippy", are the main protagonists. Hank is sincere and good-hearted, but repeatedly clashes with a cynical and devious Skippy, who mocks Hank as a "trusty". Skippy's misbehavior and thievery eventually cause the neighboring townspeople to call for the ranch's closing. The ongoing conflict between the two boys culminates in a fight in a cemetery when Hank tries to prevent Skippy from running away during a heavy rainstorm. Hank is rendered unconscious when he is knocked backwards and hits his head on a gravestone.

Later, after he learns that Hank never returned to the ranch and is missing, Skippy returns to the scene of the fight and discovers the still-unconscious Hank perilously close to drowning in the rising floodwaters. Braving the raging torrent of water, Skippy rescues Hank. Remorseful that his misbehavior has caused so much harm and nearly cost Hank his life, Skippy tearfully confesses to the thefts and returns the stolen items, his reform complete.

== Cast ==
- James Craig as Dan Walker
- Dorothy Patrick as Susan Walker
- Ray Collins as Davis Banton
- Skip Homeier as Skippy
- Darryl Hickman as Hank
- Jackie "Butch" Jenkins as Butch
- Sharon McManus as Mary Walker
- Minor Watson as Mr. Harper
- Arthur Space as Mr. O'Neill
- Robert Emmett O'Connor as Druggist
- Moroni Olsen as Judge Henderson

== Reception ==
The comedic element added by Jackie Jenkins as "Butch" was praised by Variety, which said his "every appearance is a guaranteed chuckle". According to MGM records, the movie earned $1,124,000 in the US and Canada and $378,000 elsewhere, for total revenue of $1,502,000. Boys' Ranch occasionally airs on Turner Classic Movies.
