= Stream Lion =

- Breed: Irish Sport Horse
- Sire: Ideal Water (Irish Sport Horse)
- Grandsire: Water Serpent (Thoroughbred)
- Dam: Lady Luck (Irish Sport Horse)
- Maternal grandsire: Laughton RID (Irish Draught)
- Sex: Mare
- Foaled: 1974, Ireland
- Died: Unknown
- Colour: Bay
- Breeder: Patricia Nicholson

Stream Lion is a mare well known for producing event horses, including four of Bruce Davidson's top mounts.

Patricia Nicholson, of Kells, Co.Meath, Ireland, first bought Lady Luck, a mare by the Irish Draught stallion Laughton, from a nearby farm. The mare was about to be sold "to the factory," because she was apparently unable to breed any longer, and Nicholson was able to buy both her and another mare for a cheap £40.

Impressed by the records of the get of Water Serpent, especially in the show jumping arena, Nicholson decided to breed her new mare to one of the stallion's sons, Ideal Water. The result was the filly Stream Lion.

Stream Lion was ridden by Nicholson's daughter before being handed off to Peter Charles as a show jumper. After her successful career showing, she was kept for breeding. Her first foal was the 1982 Rennies Boy gelding, named Rebel Lion, who was ridden on the amateur event circuit in Ireland by the Co Kildare rider Donal McKenna. In all she has had eight offspring: Pirate Lion, Regent Lion, Eagle Lion, and Lion King (all ridden by American eventer Bruce Davidson), the mare Cara Lion who produced Sea Lion (recently sold by Bruce Davidson) and Cruise Lion, a two-year-old colt, a mare currently kept by Patricia for breeding, and a new colt by the stallion Mr. Lord. Her four sons ridden by Davidson have had excellent careers at the highest level of eventing.
