= François André Michaux =

French botanist (1770–1855)

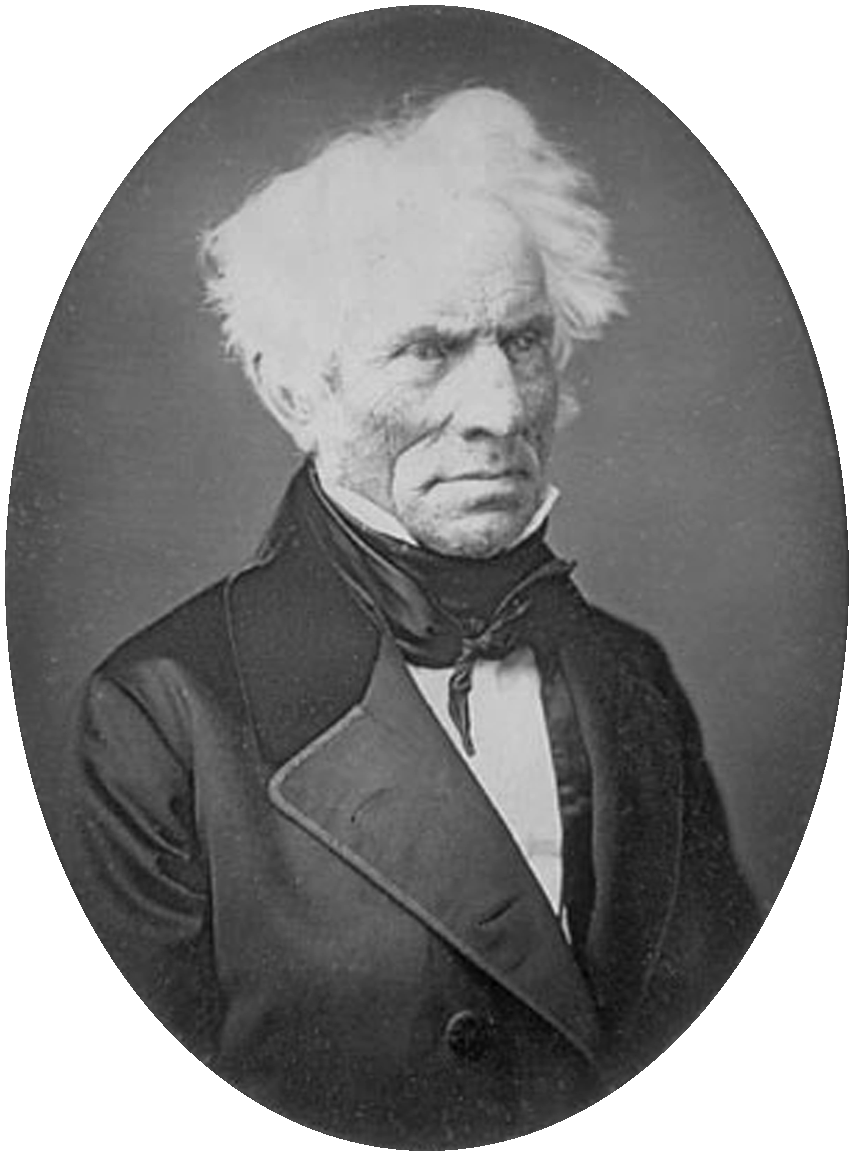
- Born: 16 August 1770
- Died: 23 October 1835 (aged 65)
- Known for: Histoire des arbres forestiers de l'Amérique septentrionale
- Father: André Michaux
- Scientific career
- Fields: Botany
- Author abbrev. (botany): F.Michx.

François André Michaux (16 August 1770 – 23 October 1855) was a French botanist, son of André Michaux and the namesake of Michaux State Forest in Pennsylvania. Michaux père botanized in North America for nearly a dozen years (1785–96) as royal collector for France.

== Travels ==
Michaux accompanied his father, André Michaux (1746–1802), to the United States, and his Histoire des arbres forestiers de l'Amérique septentrionale (three volumes, 1810–13) contains the results of his explorations, giving an account of the distribution and the scientific classification of the principal American timber trees north of Mexico and east of the Rocky Mountains. Michaux trekked the Allegheny Mountains in 1789 when trans-Allegheny travel was limited to indigenous peoples' trails and one military trail, Braddock Road, built in 1751. He travelled with friend and botanist John Fraser to the summit of the Great Roan.

== Work ==
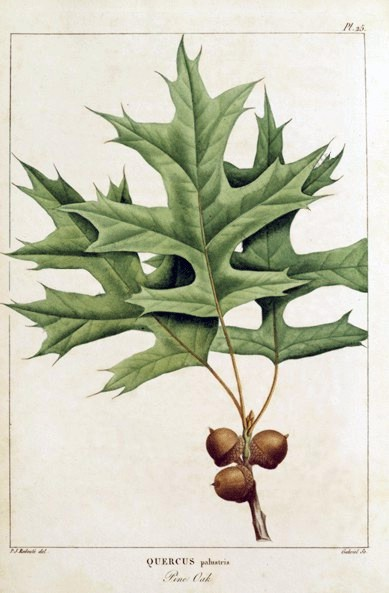
Quercus palustris, by Pierre-Joseph Redouté for François André Michaux, 1801

Under the title The North American Sylva Michaux's work was translated by Augustus Lucas Hillhouse. The work was reissued in 1852 by Robert Smith of Philadelphia, again in three quarto volumes, and again with 156 hand colored lithographs of American trees and shrubs. A supplement of three additional volumes, trees, "...not Described in the Work of F. Andrew Michaux" was issued by Smith in 1853, in the same quarto format and with 121 additional hand colored plates. The later work, by Thomas Nuttall, describes trees of the Rockies and Pacific Coast.

In 1809, Michaux was elected as a member to the American Philosophical Society.

François André Michaux published this monumental work first in French and then in English translation, between 1811 and 1819. With illustrations by Pierre-Joseph Redouté and Pancrace Bessa, two masters of botanical art, his opus rapidly became a landmark in American literature and the foundation of American forestry. His work was augmented by the British botanist, Thomas Nuttall, whose work added 121 hand-colored plates to the 156 originally published with Michaux's Sylva. His additions cover eastern species overlooked by Michaux, and new species that he had gathered on his excursions in the Midwest and West.
