= Jackie "Butch" Jenkins =

American actor

Jackie 'Butch' Jenkins
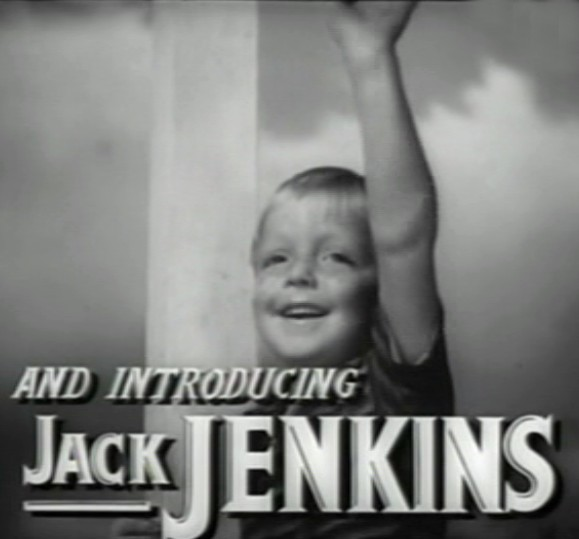
- Screenshot from the trailer for The Human Comedy, 1943
- Born: Jack Dudley Jenkins; August 29, 1937; Los Angeles, U.S
- Died: August 14, 2001 (aged 63); Asheville, North Carolina, U.S.
- Years active: 1943–1948

Jackie "Butch" Jenkins (August 29, 1937 – August 14, 2001) was an American child actor who had a brief but notable film career during the 1940s.

== Career ==
Born Jack Dudley Jenkins in Los Angeles, the son of actress Doris Dudley, Jenkins made his film debut at the age of six in The Human Comedy (1943) as "Ulysses Macauley" after an MGM talent scout saw him playing on a Santa Monica beach and admired his high spirits. His performance as Mickey Rooney's younger brother was well received and Jenkins was cast in a succession of films.

He was given star billing for the 1946 film Boys' Ranch. Inspired by the real-life ranch in Texas, which provided a home and education to underprivileged boys, MGM promoted the film as a successor to Boys Town (1938). It co-starred James Craig, who also appeared in Jenkins' other films The Human Comedy and Little Mr. Jim. Jenkins' other films include National Velvet (1944), Our Vines Have Tender Grapes (1945), My Brother Talks to Horses (1947), The Bride Goes Wild (1948) Summer Holiday (1948), and his final film Big City (1948).

Jenkins was one of several popular child actors at MGM during the 1940s, and was educated at the studio's school along with other youngsters under contract to the studio such as Elizabeth Taylor, Roddy McDowall, Margaret O'Brien, Dean Stockwell, Jane Powell, Claude Jarman Jr. and Darryl Hickman.

He was regarded as a "scene-stealer" and was notable among the studio's child stars for not being conventionally "cute". He was described by film writers Sol Chaneles and Albert Wolsky as "an audience favourite as an all-American boy [with a] space between his teeth, freckles and a tousled mop of hair – a marked contrast to the pretty children who usually appeared on screen." Pauline Kael wrote approvingly of his effectiveness as a performer, saying that his appearance as a five-year-old who enjoys waving at trains in The Human Comedy helped elevate the film, while his performance in National Velvet made him "the little brother of everyone's dreams". In 1946, exhibitors (movie theater owners) voted him the second-most promising "star of tomorrow".

== Later life and death ==
Jenkins retired from acting at the age of eleven, after he developed a stutter, and as an adult recalled his film career fondly and without regret. He did state, however, that he had not particularly enjoyed acting and had never expected to make a career of it.

Later described as a "businessman-outdoorsman", Jenkins established a successful career away from Hollywood and lived for many years in Dallas, Texas, before moving to North Carolina in the late 1970s, where he built a home "on the side of a steep mountain", where he resided with his third wife, Gloria.

On August 14, 2001, he died at age 63 in Asheville, North Carolina. Upon his death, he was cremated and his ashes returned to his family.

== Filmography ==
Year	Title	Role	Notes
1943	The Human Comedy	Ulysses Macauley	
1944	An American Romance	Thomas Jefferson Dangos - Age 6	Uncredited
1944	National Velvet	Donald Brown	
1945	Our Vines Have Tender Grapes	Arnold Hanson	
1945	Abbott and Costello in Hollywood	Himself	Uncredited
1946	Little Mister Jim	Little Jim Tukker	
1946	Boys' Ranch	'Butch' Taylor	
1947	My Brother Talks to Horses	Lewie Penrose	
1948	Summer Holiday	Tommy Miller	
1948	The Bride Goes Wild	Danny	
1948	Big City	Louis Keller	(final film role)

== Bibliography ==
- Holmstrom, John. The Moving Picture Boy: An International Encyclopaedia from 1895 to 1995, Norwich, Michael Russell, 1996, pp. 205–206.
- Best, Marc. Those Endearing Young Charms: Child Performers of the Screen, South Brunswick and New York: Barnes & Co., 1971, pp. 134–138.
