= Last of the Desperados =

- Theatrical release poster
- Directed by: Sam Newfield
- Screenplay by: Orville H. Hampton
- Produced by: Sigmund Neufeld
- Starring: James Craig; Jim Davis; Barton MacLane; Margia Dean; Donna Martell; Myrna Dell; Bob Steele; Stanley Clements
- Cinematography: Edward Linden
- Edited by: Holbrook N. Todd
- Music by: Paul Dunlap
- Production company: Sigmund Neufeld Productions
- Distributed by: Associated Film Releasing Corporation
- Release date: December 1, 1955
- Running time: 72 minutes
- Country: United States
- Language: English

Last of the Desperados is a 1955 American Western film directed by Sam Newfield and written by Orville H. Hampton. The film stars James Craig, Jim Davis, Barton MacLane, Margia Dean, Donna Martell, Myrna Dell, Bob Steele and Stanley Clements. The film was released on December 1, 1955, by Associated Film Releasing Corporation.

== Cast ==
- James Craig as Pat Garrett
- Jim Davis as John Poe
- Barton MacLane as Mosby
- Margia Dean as Sarita McGuire
- Donna Martell as Felice
- Myrna Dell as Clara Wightman
- Bob Steele as Charlie Bowdre
- Stanley Clements as Bert McGuire
- Dick Elliott as Walter Stone
