= The Bride Goes Wild =

1948 film by Norman Taurog

- Directed by: Norman Taurog
- Screenplay by: Albert Beich
- Produced by: William H. Wright
- Starring: Van Johnson; June Allyson
- Cinematography: Ray June
- Edited by: George Boemler
- Music by: Rudolph G. Kopp
- Distributed by: Metro-Goldwyn-Mayer
- Release dates: March 28, 1948 (Los Angeles); June 3, 1948 (New York)
- Running time: 98 minutes
- Country: United States
- Language: English
- Budget: $1,685,000
- Box office: $3,766,000

The Bride Goes Wild is a 1948 American romantic comedy film directed by Norman Taurog and starring Van Johnson and June Allyson.

== Cast ==
- Van Johnson as Greg Rawlings
- June Allyson as Martha Terryton
- Butch Jenkins as Danny
- Hume Cronyn as John McGrath
- Una Merkel as Miss Doberly
- Arlene Dahl as Tillie Smith
- Richard Derr as Bruce Kope Johnson
- Lloyd Corrigan as "Pop"
- Elisabeth Risdon as Mrs. Carruthers
- Clara Blandick as Aunt Pewtie
- Kathleen Howard as Aunt Susan
- Byron Foulger as Max (uncredited)
- Hank Mann as Wedding Guest (uncredited)
- William Severn as Piute Leader (uncredited)

== Reception ==
In a contemporary review for The New York Times, critic Bosley Crowther wrote: "For a movie with as inauspicious a title as 'The Bride Goes Wild' … this patchwork of sentiment and slapstick is a surprisingly genial little show. And if you'll take it as nonsense entertainment, it will give you a pretty good time. In the first place, that title means nothing—absolutely nothing at all. More appropriate to the evident activities would be 'The Picture Goes Wild.' For the most salient aspect of the story is its positive progression from a point of comparative intelligence at the beginning to reckless disorder at the end."

Critic Edwin Schallert of the Los Angeles Times wrote: "Except for its framework of plot, 'The Bride Goes Wild' is practically a throwback to the Keystone comedies—outlandish, fantastic and everything else good and bad for which these old action laugh getters were famous. Probably till doomsday the formula will still remain laugh getting .. However, audiences today, while they may enjoy these semilunatic movies in the theater, are more than likely to become embarrassed about it all afterward and not recommend such an exhibit to their friends. Consequently, 'The Bride Goes Wild' may only enjoy moderate approval at the box office, because it is on the idiotic list."

In The Boston Globe, reviewer Marjory Adams wrote: "'[W]hile its title is hackneyed and its plot is light. the picture surprisingly turns out to be gay and welcome entertainment. In fact this critic can unhesitatingly recommend the new comedy to everyone who likes to be amused and who enjoys novel twists of characterization."

The film earned $2,707,000 in the U.S. and Canada and $1,059,000 elsewhere.

== Legacy ==
The Bride Goes Wild was presented on the Stars in the Air radio program on February 28, 1952. Dick Powell and June Allyson starred in the 30-minute adaptation.

Turner Classic Movies presented The Bride Goes Wild on October 7, 2015 in commemoration of what would have been Allyson's 98th birthday.
