= Summer Holiday (1948 film) =

1948 film by Rouben Mamoulian

- Theatrical release poster
- Directed by: Rouben Mamoulian
- Screenplay by: Frances Goodrich; Albert Hackett
- Adaptation by: Irving Brecher; Jean Holloway
- Based on: Ah, Wilderness! by Eugene O'Neill
- Produced by: Arthur Freed
- Starring: Mickey Rooney; Gloria DeHaven; Walter Huston; Frank Morgan; Butch Jenkins; Marilyn Maxwell; Agnes Moorehead; Selena Royle
- Cinematography: Charles Schoenbaum
- Edited by: Albert Akst
- Music by: Lennie Hayton
- Production company: Metro-Goldwyn-Mayer
- Distributed by: Loew's Inc.
- Release date: April 16, 1948
- Running time: 93 minutes
- Country: United States
- Language: English
- Budget: $2,237,000
- Box office: $1,609,000

Summer Holiday is a 1948 American musical comedy film directed by Rouben Mamoulian and starring Mickey Rooney and Gloria DeHaven. It is based on the 1933 play Ah, Wilderness! by Eugene O'Neill, which had been adapted under that name by MGM in 1935 with Rooney in a much smaller role as the younger brother. Although completed in October 1946, the film sat on the shelf until 1948.

In addition to Walter Huston, the supporting cast features Frank Morgan as the drunken Uncle Sid (a role originated in the stage play by Gene Lockhart, portrayed on screen by Wallace Beery in 1935, and later by Jackie Gleason on Broadway), as well as Marilyn Maxwell, Agnes Moorehead, Selena Royle, and Anne Francis. One of producer Arthur Freed's MGM musicals, it has costumes and cinematography that take full advantage of the Technicolor process.

== Plot ==
In Danville, Connecticut, in June 1906, 17-year-old Richard Miller is about to graduate from high school, go to Yale, and step into the world of adults. He has a cynical view of the world because of all the books he has been reading. He has a girlfriend, Muriel McComber, whom he loves very much (she lives across the street), but she is afraid of being kissed. He tries to convince her as they sing "Afraid to Fall in Love". He does not get the kiss, but they do dance across the park.

Richard's father Nat Miller, editor of the town newspaper, is a wise man with a sense of humor that serves him well in facing the challenges of parenthood. Richard has three other siblings: older brother Arthur, who is home on vacation from Yale; sister Mildred; and mischievous Tommy, the youngest.

Also living with the family are his Uncle Sid and Cousin Lily. They are usually on the verge of getting engaged, but the uncle's drinking gets in the way. Uncle Sid is leaving for a new job in Waterbury in hopes of making good (he is nearly 50).

The graduating class enters the auditorium marching to the Danville High fight song which smoothly transitions to an elegiac alma mater, and the camera pans over touching vignettes of listening townspeople, including deliberate recreations of Grant Wood's Daughters of Revolution, Woman with Plants, and American Gothic. Richard, who is valedictorian, plans to give a Marxist call to arms, but he leaves his speech where his father can see it. During a round of applause, Nat stops Richard before he can get to the revolutionary material. After the ceremony, his father asks him if his conscience will allow him to drive the family's Stanley Steamer. A bright number built around the song "Stanley Steamer" follows.

On a peaceful July morning, the town is decorated with flags in celebration of the Fourth of July. The quiet is soon interrupted by explosions as children and a grandfather who is young at heart set off an impressive display of fireworks throughout the town.

Richard, still spouting revolutionary propaganda and scorning the 4th, is surprised to find that his father has not only read Carlyle's The French Revolution: A History but also admires it -— as he does the Rubáiyát of Omar Khayyam. Mother Essie, on the other hand, is horrified at Richard's choice of reading, which also includes Swinburne and Oscar Wilde's The Ballad of Reading Gaol, and says that this "is no kind of reading for a young boy".

Uncle Sid appears, and Nat quickly realizes that he has been fired. To save him the embarrassment, he offers Sid his old job.

At the bandstand, a cornet player displays his skill, setting off the "Independence Day" number. A tableau recreating The Spirit of '76 takes a bow. Everyone celebrates at separate picnics; each area has its own routine to go with "Independence Day".

At the men's picnic, they have a beer-drinking contest, which Sid wins. At the women's picnic, they play croquet and share the delicacies they have cooked. The kids swim in the pond, and the young people sing and dance.

No sooner does the Miller family return home for dinner than Muriel's father arrives, accusing Richard of corrupting Muriel's morals. He saw Richard trying to kiss her. As if that weren't bad enough, the letters Richard wrote to her are worse. When Nat Miller takes the whole thing with a sense of humor, McComber threatens him with withdrawing his advertising in the paper and storms out, leaving a farewell letter (dictated by McComber) from Muriel to Richard. When Richard reads it, he is heartbroken, devastated, and angry; he bursts into tears.

At the dinner table, a tipsy Sid has everyone laughing, but Lily weeps, saying that they all encourage him and laugh at him —- and maybe they should not. Richard launches into a diatribe about women driving men to drink and marches out of the house. At the front gate, his older brother's friend Wint invites him on a double date with some "slick babies from New Haven". They turn out to be a couple of dance hall girls. Wint and Crystal leave immediately. Richard's girl Belle takes him to a bar to drink, although he is underage.

Like the opening, this is a long scene mixing spoken and sung dialogue. It has a nightmarish quality that is enhanced by the way Belle's costume changes, from pastel pink to scarlet and back, and by the bright green wash of light over the background.

The bartender slips something into Richard's drink. He gets drunk but it has the opposite effect to what Belle expected. He starts trying to reform her. Belle gets fed up with him and goes to sit with another guy. When that man points out that Richard is underage, the bartender throws him out. After Belle tells him that the boy is the son of a newspaper owner and could run him out of town, he throws Belle out.

Richard arrives home drunk and miserable. The next day, Belle writes to Nat, having reported the bartender for serving alcohol to an underage boy.

Meanwhile Muriel finally finds a way to send a note of apology to Richard through Tommy, saying that she will always love him. They meet at night at the brook and finally kiss.

He returns home in a state of exultation. His father says that it is about time that they had a serious talk about "certain women". Nat hems and haws, mangling Richard's clay sculpture of Lincoln and never completing a sentence. Finally Richard, full of concern, gives his father a drink of water and tells him not to worry, that he is going to marry Muriel.

Sid and Lily are on the swing drinking lemonade. Mildred and Art are out walking with their sweethearts. Mr. McComber and Nat have reconciled. Richard's outlook on the future is now brighter and happier. "We are completely surrounded by love," Nat says. Richard kisses his parents and goes to look at the moon, waving goodnight to Muriel, who is standing in her bedroom window. Nat, surveying the scene, quotes the Rubaiyat and says to his wife, "Spring isn't everything".

== Cast ==
- Mickey Rooney as Richard Miller
- Gloria DeHaven as Muriel
- Walter Huston as Nat Miller
- Frank Morgan as Uncle Sid
- Butch Jenkins as Tommy
- Marilyn Maxwell as Belle
- Agnes Moorehead as Cousin Lily
- Selena Royle as Mrs. Miller
- Michael Kirby as Arthur Miller
- Shirley Johns as Mildred
- Hal Hackett as Wint
- Anne Francis as Elsie Rand
- John Alexander as Mr. McComber
- Virginia Brissac as Miss Hawley
- Howard Freeman as Mr. Peabody
- Emory Parnell as Danville Beach Club Bartender

== Musical selections ==
- "It's Our Home Town" (sung by Walter Huston, Mickey Rooney, Gloria De Haven)
- "Afraid to Fall in Love" (Mickey Rooney, Gloria De Haven)
- "All Hail Danville High" (sung by cast)
- "The Stanley Steamer" (Mickey Rooney, Gloria De Haven, Walter Huston, Agnes Moorehead, etc.)
- "It's Independence Day" (sung by cast)
- "Weary Blues" (sung by Marilyn Maxwell)
- "I Think You're the Sweetest Kid I've Ever Known" (sung by Marilyn Maxwell)

== Production ==
Building on his experience of integrating book and music for the original Broadway production of Oklahoma!, director Rouben Mamoulian saw this project as an opportunity to create a different kind of film musical than the studio had tried before, and he gave the songwriting team of Ralph Blane (lyrics) and Harry Warren (music) specific instructions on what he wanted to achieve.

The result can be seen in the opening sequence "Our Home Town", begun by Nat Miller, who introduces us to the town and to the family. The sequence segues back and forth and back again into lines that are sung, lines that are spoken in rhyme, and lines that are read straight, ending at the soda fountain. The length of this sequence may be the root of the incorrect idea that the whole film is written in rhyme.

== Reception ==
Bosley Crowther in The New York Times regrets that the film adaptation of Ah, Wilderness! substitutes Eugene O'Neill's "reminiscence of adolescent youth" for the antics of Andy Hardy's Mickey Rooney, "clowning in his familiarly broad and impish way" and "his inclination to steal every scene". Crowther notes director Rouben Mamoulian's effective handling of the "I Think You're the Sweetest Kid I've Ever Known" musical sequence with Marilyn Maxwell and is generally approving of the entire cast. He closes the review with faint praise: "And it all looks attractive in color. So it may do for casual summer fun."

Much of the criticism was harsh, including the British press, where C. A. Lejeune in The Observer called Summer Holiday "a degrading film".

== Box office ==
The film was a disappointment at the box office, earning only $1,208,000 in the U.S. and Canada and $401,000 elsewhere, resulting in a loss of $1,460,000. Today it is considered a minor classic, "largely because of Mamoulian's innovative approach".

== Retrospective appraisal ==
Film historian Tom Milne praises the "utopian" Midwestern idyll that Mamoulian creates, in particular the "superb" Independence Day picnic sequence. Milne adds this caveat:

The film is least successful in one brief sequence where it attempts to re-create too faithfully in a series of tableaux vivants based on famous paintings by Grant Wood (Daughters of Revolution (1932) as well as American Gothic (1930)). Thomas Hart Benton's Ploughing It Under also makes an appearance.

Summer Holiday suffers from an "overblown artificiality", reflecting a distorted Hollywood view of small-town America in 1912. Film historian Marc Spergel places responsibility for this on director Rouben Momoulian:

Mamoulian typically bloated a simple story with visual excess. What he achieved in visual splendor and taste was done at the expense of honest feeling and insight. What we get instead is Mamoulian showing us his cleverness and skill at manipulation.

Spergel adds that contemporary reviews were almost unanimous in their distaste for Mamoulian's handling of Mickey Rooney in his role as the youth Richard Miller: "...showing off and over-acting to the detriment of the film".

Film critic Kurt Jensen points out that Rooney's performance was not only in stark contrast to O'Neill's protagonist Richard Miller, but also to Rooney's own romantic life, a fact of which movie audiences were well aware. Aged 26 and recently divorced from movie star Ava Gardner, he could hardly pass as a high school virgin on or off screen.

Jenson cautions that despite his critics, Mamoulian's film adaption showed fidelity to O'Neill but erred in duplicating the spirit of the play perhaps too fulsomely.
