= Winners of the West =

Winners of the West can refer to two separate Universal film serials:

- Winners of the West (1921 serial), early silent serial
- Winners of the West (1940 serial), sound serial

== See also ==
- Winning of the West, 1953 film starring Gene Autrey
- How the West Was Won, 1962 film
