= The Omaha Trail =

1942 film by Edward Buzzell

- Theatrical release poster
- Directed by: Edward Buzzell
- Screenplay by: Jesse Lasky Jr. Hugo Butler
- Story by: Jesse Lasky Jr.
- Produced by: Jack Chertok
- Starring: James Craig; Pamela Blake; Dean Jagger
- Cinematography: Sidney Wagner
- Edited by: Conrad A. Nervig
- Music by: David Snell
- Distributed by: Metro-Goldwyn-Mayer
- Release date: September 1942
- Running time: 62 minutes
- Country: United States
- Language: English
- Budget: $436,000
- Box office: $423,000

The Omaha Trail is a 1942 American Western film directed by Edward Buzzell. It stars James Craig and Pamela Blake.

== Plot ==
In the Old West, a Mr. Vane owns a locomotive that he wants transported by oxen-pulled freight line to Omaha. Vane hires Pat Candel to help oversee the trail run. "Pipestone" Ross owns the freight line and goes on the trip with his fiance, Julie Santley, and Julie's father, Ben, who is Ross' business partner. Also on the journey is the train's engineer, Jonah McLeod. Candel is attracted to Julie, but she rebuffs him due to her commitment to Ross.

Knowing that the expansion of railroads to the West will hurt his wagon-based freight line business, Ross plans to sabotage Vane's convoy to prevent the locomotive from arriving in Omaha. Ross and his henchmen, Nat and Job, whittle down a wagon hitch pin which breaks and causes the locomotive engine to detach from the oxen. Jonah's leg is badly broken by the runaway train. Ben Santley tells Ross he does not want to assist with his plan if it means injuring or killing others. The convoy encounters Sioux Indians who allow passage after they receive bags of flour. Nat shoots two of the Sioux on their return trip in order to stir the tribe into attacking the convoy, thus preventing safe passage to Omaha. The convoy encircles itself and fends off an attack by Sioux warriors. Afterward, Ross demands the locomotive and other heavy equipment be abandoned and the convoy make its way to Omaha before the Sioux attack again. Only Ross' henchmen agree, with everyone else, including Julie and Ben, choosing to remain with the locomotive. Ross seizes their firearms and leaves. Ben is shot dead as he tries to retrieve his gun. Julie realizes she now has no future with Ross and falls for Candel. The convoys fends off a second Sioux attack and make it safely to Omaha. Candel shoots Ross' two henchmen and then calls Ross out from a saloon. Ross goes out unarmed; however, Candel gives him a gun forcing him into a gunfight. Candel prevails and he and Julie embrace.

== Cast ==
- James Craig as Pat Candel
- Pamela Blake as Julie Santley
- Dean Jagger as "Pipestone" Ross
- Edward Ellis as Mr. Vane
- Chill Wills as Henry Hawkins
- Donald Meek as Engineer Jonah McCleod
- Howard Da Silva as Ben Santley
- Harry Morgan as Henchman Nat (as Henry Morgan)
- Morris Ankrum as Henchman Job

== Notes ==
According to MGM records the film earned $293,000 in the US and Canada and $130,000 elsewhere, making a loss of $161,000.
