= The Persuader (film) =

1957 film

- Directed by: Dick Ross
- Screenplay by: Curtis Kenyon
- Story by: Dick Ross
- Produced by: Dick Ross
- Starring: William Talman; James Craig; Kristine Miller; Darryl Hickman; Georgia Lee; Alvy Moore
- Cinematography: Ralph Woolsey
- Edited by: Eugene Pendleton
- Music by: Ralph Carmichael
- Production company: World Wide Pictures
- Distributed by: Allied Artists Pictures
- Release date: October 13, 1957
- Running time: 72 minutes
- Country: United States
- Language: English

The Persuader is a 1957 American Western film directed by Dick Ross and written by Curtis Kenyon. The film stars William Talman, James Craig, Kristine Miller, Darryl Hickman, Georgia Lee and Alvy Moore. The film was released on October 13, 1957, by Allied Artists Pictures.

== Cast ==
- William Talman as Matt Bonham / Mark Bonham
- James Craig as Bick Justin
- Kristine Miller as Kathryn Bonham
- Darryl Hickman as Toby Bonham
- Georgia Lee as Cora Nicklin
- Alvy Moore as Willy Williams
- Gregory Walcott as Jim Cleery
- Rhoda Williams as Nell Landis
- Paul Engle as Paul Bonham
- Jason Johnson as Morse Fowler
- Nolan Leary as Dan
- John Milford as Clint
- Frank Richards as Steve
