= The Human Comedy (film) =

1943 film directed by Clarence Brown

- Film poster
- Directed by: Clarence Brown
- Screenplay by: Howard Estabrook
- Based on: The Human Comedy; 1943 novel by William Saroyan
- Produced by: Clarence Brown
- Starring: Mickey Rooney; Frank Morgan
- Cinematography: Harry Stradling
- Edited by: Conrad A. Nervig
- Music by: Herbert Stothart
- Production company: Metro-Goldwyn-Mayer
- Distributed by: Loew's, Inc
- Release date: March 2, 1943
- Running time: 118 minutes
- Country: United States
- Language: English
- Budget: $1.0 million
- Box office: $3.9 million

The Human Comedy is a 1943 American comedy-drama film directed by Clarence Brown adapted from the novel of the same name by William Saroyan. Produced by Metro-Goldwyn-Mayer (MGM), the film stars Mickey Rooney, Frank Morgan, James Craig, Marsha Hunt, Fay Bainter, Ray Collins, Van Johnson, Donna Reed and Jackie "Butch" Jenkins. Barry Nelson, Robert Mitchum and Don DeFore appear together as boisterous soldiers in uncredited supporting roles.

== Plot ==
In the fictional town of Ithaca, California, Mr. Macauley has been dead for two years, leaving behind a wife, three sons, and a daughter. His oldest son Marcus is enlisted as a private in the U.S. Army during World War II. His middle son Homer Macauley works as a telegram delivery boy for the Postal Telegraph Company to support his family. He befriends his boss, Tom Sprangler, a track-and-field champion, and Willie Grogan, a veteran telegrapher.

One day, Homer delivers a telegram to a family, informing that their son was killed in service. He returns to the office, where Willie states the company has been forcing him to retire. After work, Homer returns home and tells his mother about the grim nature of his new life. The next morning, Homer is forced to stay after school when he trades insults with his rival, Hubert Ackley III, during his ancient history class. The teacher Miss Hicks scolds them for their behavior. When Hubert is given special privilege to leave, she allows Homer to compete at the track meet. Homer later wins the race.

Meanwhile, Tom accepts an invitation from his socialite girlfriend, Diana Steed, to meet her parents for the first time. Just when Diana's parents are about to step out, Tom dashes out and confesses he is afraid he will not meet her parents' expectations. Diana however encourages him, and Tom meets them. Back at the telegraph office, Homer receives Hubert's telegram, instructing him to sing "Happy birthday" to Helen Elliott, his boyhood crush. He reluctantly complies, and afterwards, he and Hubert settle their differences.

Elsewhere, Homer's sister Bess and Marcus's fiancée Mary Arena meet three soldiers on leave—Horse, Texas, and Fat—on their way to a movie theater and invite them along. In North Carolina, where Marcus is stationed, he tells his Army buddy, Tobey George, about his life in Ithaca and shares a picture of his sister Bess, hoping they will meet.

Back in Ithaca, Tom tells Willie he is engaged to Diana. The same morning, Homer's youngest brother Ulysses accompanies his friend Lionel to the public library. After they play with other neighborhood boys, Ulysses becomes afraid of a mime inside a window display. He reunites with Homer and they take a bicycle ride back home. As Marcus is shipped out for duty, Homer reads a letter from him and to prepare for his possible death. When he finishes reading, Homer tells Willie that he will "spit at the world" if Marcus is killed.

Months later, after they pass through a festival, Tom tells his new bride, Diana, who is pregnant with their first child, that he has enlisted in the Navy. At the telegram office, Homer finds Willie asleep at his desk and immediately fetches for coffee. When he returns, he finds Willie has died. Suddenly, Tobey has arrived in town, while Homer reads an unfinished telegram indicating Marcus has been killed.

Tom consoles Homer, who is too grief-stricken to tell his family. Later that night, after Homer gathers the courage, he meets Tobey outside the Macauleys' home. Tobey informs Homer he is retired for good due to his injury, and hands Homer Marcus's class ring. After they walk towards the front door, Homer greets his family.

== Cast ==
- Mickey Rooney as Homer Macauley
- Frank Morgan as Willie Grogan
- James Craig as Tom Spangler
- Marsha Hunt as Diana Steed
- Fay Bainter as Mrs. Macauley
- Ray Collins as Mr. Macauley
- Van Johnson as Marcus Macauley
- Donna Reed as Bess Macauley
- Jackie Jenkins as Ulysses Macauley
- Dorothy Morris as Mary Arena
- John Craven as Tobey George
- Ann Ayars as Mrs. Sandoval
- Mary Nash as Miss Hicks
- Henry O'Neill as Charles Steed
- Katharine Alexander as Mrs. Steed
- Alan Baxter as Brad Stickman
- Darryl Hickman as Lionel
- Barry Nelson as Fat
- Rita Quigley as Helen Elliot
- Clem Bevans as Henderson
- Adeline De Walt Reynolds as Librarian

Robert Mitchum (as Horse) and Don DeFore (as Texas) appear in small roles as soldiers who, with their buddy Fat, have a night off from training. Trying to meet girls and take in a movie, they meet Bess and Mary. Although they have character names and lines in the script (Mitchum portrays "Quentin"), both are uncredited. Carl Switzer, probably best known as "Alfalfa" in the Our Gang shorts, appears uncredited as Auggie, a friend of Ulysses.

== Production ==
William Saroyan wrote a film treatment and expanded it into a screenplay that he had expected to direct. However, he left the project when his 240-page script proved to be too long—approximately 4 hours long—and he was removed as director. Saroyan went home and turned his original script into a novel, which was published just before the film's release and became an instant best-seller.

Saroyan was not at all happy with the film as completed by Clarence Brown. Among the noticeable differences between the film and the novel are a more vivid characterization of the four-year-old Ulysses, stronger social criticism and far fewer sentimental scenes than were incorporated into the film by Estabrook and Brown.

Several sources indicate that The Human Comedy was the favorite film of MGM studio chief, Louis B. Mayer.

According to the American Film Institute, music credited in the film included "All the World Will Be Jealous of Me", by Ernest R. Ball and Al Dubin, and "Leaning on the Everlasting Arms", words by E. A. Hoffman, music by A. J. Showalter, but they are not credited on screen. Music is important to the Macauley family and to those around them, including Marcus's Army buddies. The score is full of allusive phrases and songs, that were familiar to 1943 audiences, from the strains of the "Star-Spangled Banner" that open and close the film, to little Ulysses' fascination with "My Old Kentucky Home", to a long, rousing rendition of "Leaning on the Everlasting Arms", sung by the soldiers on the train, where one shot breaks the fourth wall and invites the audience to sing along to the last chorus. Alcoholic Mr. Grogan copes with the despair caused by the relentless stream of telegrams from the War Department by turning to songs—"Rock of Ages" and "Church in the Wildwood" among them—as well as cold water in the face and black coffee. Mrs. Sandoval rocks and croons "Cielito lindo" to the memory of the son she has just lost. Other pieces woven into the score are: "Where the River Shannon Flows", "When Irish Eyes Are Smiling", "Now the Day Is Over", "My Country 'Tis of Thee", "You're in the Army Now", "Git Along Little Dogies", "The Happy Farmer", "Polly Wolly Doodle", "Onward Christian Soldiers", "The Caissons Go Rolling Along", "Christ the Lord is Risen Today" and "A Dream", an old love song sung by Mary and Bess as Tobey and Homer approach the house with news of Marcus's death. In the scene where Tom and Diana Spangler drive through the Valley Festival, he points out the people wearing traditional costume, playing traditional music and dancing folk dances: "Greeks, Serbs, Russians, Poles, Spanish, Mexicans, Armenians, Swedes and all the rest".

== Reception ==
=== Box office ===
The Human Comedy earned $2,824,000 in the US and Canada and $1,034,000 million elsewhere, resulting in a profit of $1,531,000.

=== Critical reaction ===
Bosley Crowther of The New York Times praised the film's performances, especially Rooney's, saying that "There is a tenderness and restraint in his characterization." But he chided the film for excessive sentimentality, saying it featured "some most charming bits of fine motion-picture expression and some most maudlin gobs of cinematic goo."

Variety commented that Saroyan's "initial original screenplay is a brilliant sketch of the basic fundamentals of the American way of life, transferred to the screen with exceptional fidelity."

James Agee of The Nation stated, "The picture is mainly a mess ... Many of its faults, and most of its virtues, are those of its author ... in nearly every respect the treatment it gets wobbles between that stultifying kind of slick-paper competence which is worse than no competence at all and unforgivable errors of taste and judgment. The best one can say of it ... is that it tries on the whole to be "faithful" to Saroyan; not invariably a good idea. The worst, in my opinion, lies less in its active failures of taste or of plain sense than in its easygoing, self-pleased, Mortimer Snerdish neglect of some magnificent opportunities."

According to TCM's Notes on the production, the reviewer for The Hollywood Reporter wrote: "the best picture this reviewer has ever seen," Daily Variety predicted it would be "one of the screen's immortals." The Motion Picture Research Bureau gave it the best audience ratings. The Canadian Department of National Defence named it the best film of 1943.

Leonard Maltin gives the picture 3 1/2 out of 4 stars, describing it as: "Memorable Americana, faithfully adapted... Unfolds like a novel, with many lovely vignettes, and one of Rooney's best performances..."

In 2010, Dennis Schwartz wrote that the film: "outdoes Capra in cornball melodrama, but does it well...(It) gets the close-knit community mood right of small town America during World War II, and keeps it from becoming bloated with sentimentality (though it’s unquestionably sugary) ... (reminding) Americans of an innocent time when they believed they were warm-hearted decent people who cared about their country, community and others ... where one could advance by getting a good public education and the people in the country felt they could safely leave their house doors unlocked. It’s an America that probably no longer exists, which makes this film relic a memorable look back."

Rotten Tomatoes rates it 80 percent fresh.

== Awards ==
It won the Oscar for Best Story and was nominated for Best Actor in a Leading Role (Mickey Rooney), Best Cinematography, Black-and-White, Best Director and Best Picture.
