= Eagle Lion =

Event horse (1985–2013)

- Breed: Irish Draught Sport Horse
- Sire: Gipfel (Thoroughbred)
- Grandsire: Henry the Seventh (Thoroughbred)
- Dam: Stream Lion (Irish Draught Sport Horse)
- Maternal grandsire: Ideal Water (Irish Draught Sport Horse)
- Sex: Gelding
- Foaled: 1985, Ireland
- Colour: Bay
- Breeder: Patricia Nicholson
- Owner: Mr. George Strawberry of Wilmington, DE

Eagle Lion (1985-2013) was an event horse that successfully competed at the highest level of the sport. He stood 16.1 hh (169 cm).

Eagle Lion was out of Stream Lion, a producer of event horses, including stablemates Pirate Lion and Regent Lion. His Thoroughbred sire, Gipfel, stood in Germany and was known for producing sport horses.

With rider Bruce Davidson, Eagle Lion won the Fairhill CCI***, and the Badminton Horse Trials, becoming the first of only two American horses to win the event.

Artist Jean Clagett commemorated Eagle Lion and Davidson in bronze jumping over the "Head of the Lake" obstacle at the Rolex Kentucky Three Day. The sculpture was mounted at the Kentucky Horse Park during the 2007 Rolex Three Day.

Eagle Lion is one of the only horses to complete the 4-star course at Badminton with no jump penalties and no time penalties four times.

== Eventing record ==
2001

- 10th Rolex Kentucky Three Day CCI****
- 3rd North American Beaulieu Classic HT (Advanced)

2000

- 7th Rolex Kentucky Three Day CCI****
- 1st Morven Park Spring H.T. (Advanced)
- 1st Pine Top Farm Spring HT (Advanced)
- 9th Basingstoke Farms H.T. (AI)

1998

- 3rd Badminton Horse Trials CCI****
- 6th Beaulieu North American Classic H.T. (Advanced)
- 7th Morven Park Spring H.T. (Advanced)

1997

- 11th Burghley Horse Trials CCI***
- 8th Badminton Horse Trials CCI****
- 14th Beaulieu North American Classic H.T. (Advanced)
- 1st Morven Park Spring H.T. (Advanced)

1996

- 3rd Fair Hill International Three-Day Event 3S
- 7th Morven Park H.T. (Advanced)
- 22nd Beaulieu North American Classic H.T. (Advanced)
- 14th Morven Park Spring H.T. (Advanced)
- 14th Sharpton Winter H.T. HT (Intermediate)

1995

- 1st Badminton Horse Trials 3D CCI****
- 12th Beaulieu North American Classic H.T. (Advanced)
- 4th Morven Park Spring H.T. (Advanced)

1994

- 4th Badminton Horse Trials CCI****

1993

- 4th Burghley Horse Trials CCI***

1992

- 1st Fair Hill International Three-Day Event 3S
- 2nd Pleasant Hollow Farms Inc. H.T. (Advanced)
- 4th Fair Hill H.T. (Advanced)
- 1st Loudoun Hunt P.C. Spring H.T. (Intermediate)

1991

- 8th Radnor Hunt International Three-Day Event 2S
- 1st Fair Hill H.T. (Intermediate)
- 6th Millbrook Equestrian Center H.T. (Intermediate)
- 4th Groton House Farm H.T. (Intermediate)
- 4th Fair Hill May H.T. (Intermediate)

1990

- 7th Ledyard Farm 3-Day Event 1S
- 2nd Millbrook Equestrian Center H.T. (Preliminary)
- 3rd Pleasant Hollow Farms, Inc. H.T. (Preliminary)
- 1st Somerset Hills H.T. (Preliminary)
