= William Jacob Robbins =

American botanist (1890–1978)

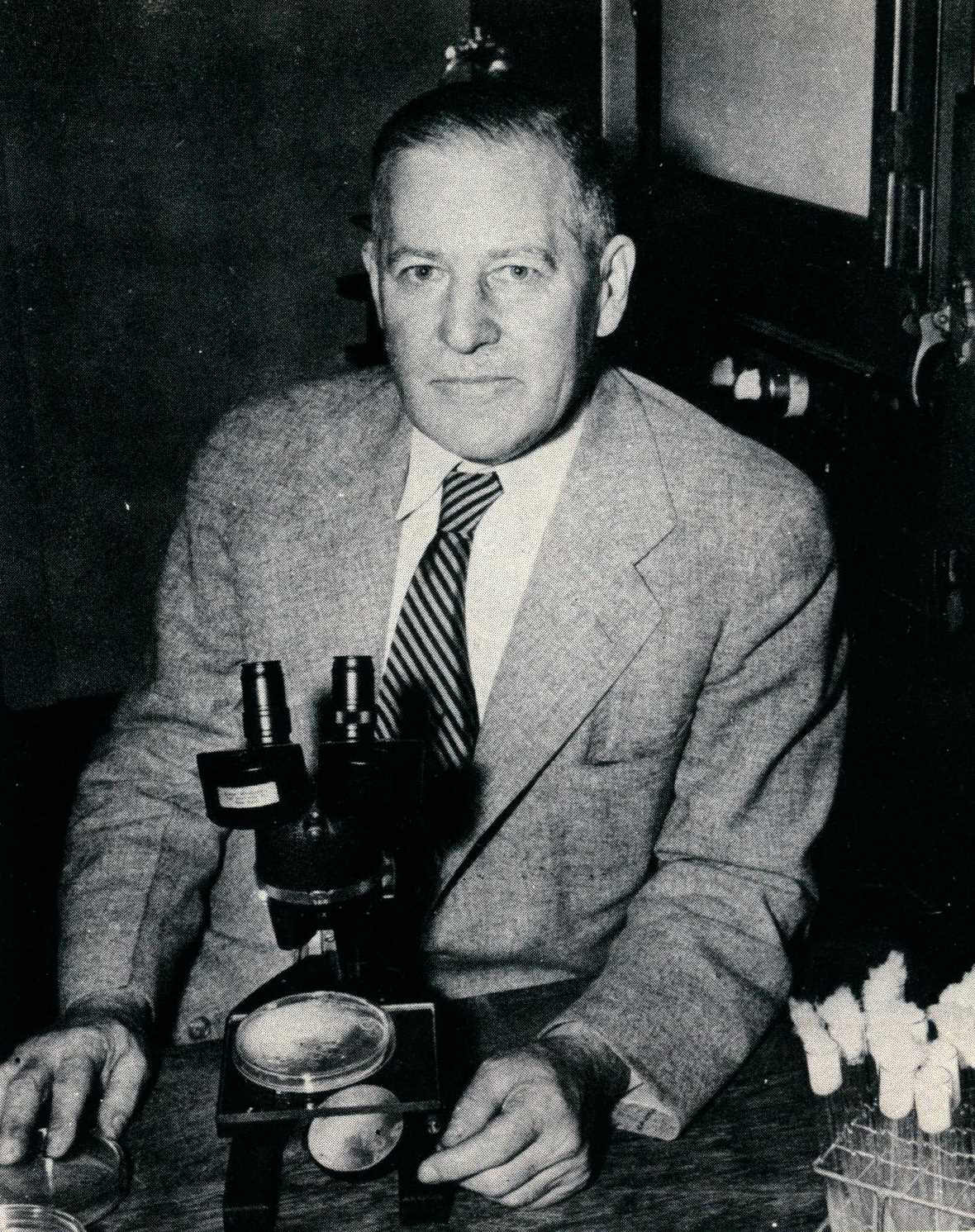

William Jacob Robbins (1890–1978) was an American botanist and physiologist. He attended Lehigh University from 1906 to 1910 and earned a Ph.D. from Cornell University in 1915. He was director of the New York Botanical Garden from 1937 to 1957. He was a member of the National Academy of Sciences and the American Philosophical Society, serving as president of the latter from 1956 to 1959. In 1943 he served as president of the Botanical Society of America and Torrey Botanical Club. The standard author abbreviation W.J.Robbins is used to indicate this person as the author when citing a botanical name. He was the father of virologist and Nobel Prize Laureate Frederick Chapman Robbins.
