= Winners of the West (1940 serial) =

1940 film by Ford Beebe, Ray Taylor

- Theatrical release poster
- Directed by: Ford Beebe; Ray Taylor
- Written by: George H. Plympton; Basil Dickey; Charles R. Condon
- Produced by: Henry MacRae
- Starring: Dick Foran; Anne Nagel; Tom Fadden; James Craig; Harry Woods; Charles Stevens
- Cinematography: Jerome Ash; John Hickson; William A. Sickner
- Edited by: Saul A. Goodkind (supervising); Joseph Gluck; Louis Sackin; Alvin Todd
- Music by: Hans J. Salter
- Distributed by: Universal Pictures
- Release date: July 2, 1940
- Running time: 13 chapters (247 min)
- Country: United States
- Language: English

Winners of the West is a 1940 American Western film serial from Universal Pictures, directed by Ford Beebe and Ray Taylor. It stars Dick Foran and Anne Nagel in a plot about the construction of a railroad and a local ganglord, who opposes it. It was Universal's 115th serial release (the 47th with sound).

The studio had used the name for an earlier silent serial, but there are no plot similarities between the two versions. Columbia's Roar of the Iron Horse is very similar to this serial, however, and the writer George H. Plympton worked on both.

== Plot ==
The Southwest Central Railroad Company is attempting to build a railroad through "Hell's Gate Pass". However, King Carter, the self-appointed ruler of the land beyond the pass, does not want this to happen. He sends henchmen, including local Indians, to disrupt the construction anyway they can, from sabotage to kidnapping Claire Hartford, the daughter of the company President. The President's assistant, Jeff Ramsay, and his sidekicks stop King Carter's schemes at every point and, eventually, defeat him entirely. This opens the area up to new settlers, the first of which is Jeff himself and his new wife, Claire.

== Cast ==
- Dick Foran as Jeff Ramsay, employee of the Hartford Transcontinental Railroad
- Anne Nagel as Claire Hartford, daughter of John Hartford
- Tom Fadden as Tex Houston, scout and one of Jeff Ramsay's sidekicks
- James Craig as Jim Jackson, another of Jeff Ramsay's sidekicks
- Harry Woods as King Carter, villain
- Charles Stevens as Snakeye, King Carter's lead henchman
- Edward Keane as John Hartford, President of the Hartford Transcontinental Railroad
- Trevor Bardette as Raven, one of King Carter's henchmen
- Edgar Edwards as Tim, one of King Carter's henchmen
- Edmund Cobb as Maddox, one of King Carter's henchmen
- William Desmond as Bill Brine, Railroad foreman
- Roy Barcroft as Logan, one of King Carter's henchmen

== Production ==
=== Stunts ===
- Cliff Lyons, riding double for Dick Foran (Jeff Ramsay) and Tom Fadden (Tex Houston)
- Eddie Parker, fight double for Dick Foran (Jeff Ramsay)
- Fred Graham, doubling Harry Woods (King Carter)
- Kermit Maynard
- Ken Terrell
- Henry Wills

== Chapter titles ==
- 1: Redskins Ride Again is available for free viewing and download at the Internet Archive
- 2: The Wreck at Red River Gorge
- 3: The Bridge of Disaster
- 4: Trapped by Redskins is available for free viewing and download at the Internet Archive
- 5: Death Strikes the Trail is available for free viewing and download at the Internet Archive
- 6: A Leap for Life is available for free viewing and download at the Internet Archive
- 7: Thundering Terror is available for free viewing and download at the Internet Archive
- 8: The Flaming Arsenal is available for free viewing and download at the Internet Archive
- 9: Sacrificed by Savages is available for free viewing and download at the Internet Archive
- 10: Under Crashing Timbers is available for free viewing and download at the Internet Archive
- 11: Bullets in the Dark is available for free viewing and download at the Internet Archive
- 12: The Battle of Blackhawk is available for free viewing and download at the Internet Archive
- 13: Barricade Blasted is available for free viewing and download at the Internet Archive

_{Source for chapter names:}

== See also ==
- List of film serials
- List of film serials by studio

Preceded by Flash Gordon Conquers the Universe (1940)	Universal Serial; Winners of the West (1940)	Succeeded by Junior G-Men (1940)
