= Harry Baker Humphrey =

American botanist

Harry Baker Humphrey (4 August, 1873–1955) was an American botanist. He was a pathologist with the USDA, specializing on research on breeding resistance to grain smut, and president of the American Phytopathological Society. His posthumously published book Makers of North American Botany (1961) contains 121 brief biographies of outstanding botanists active in North America.
