= Roy Rowland (film director) =

Hollywood movie director (1910–1995)

- Born: December 31, 1910; New York City, New York, U.S.
- Died: June 29, 1995 (aged 84); Orange, California, U.S.
- Occupation(s): Film director, producer

Roy Rowland (December 31, 1910 – June 29, 1995) was an American film director. He directed a number of films in the 1950s and 1960s including Our Vines Have Tender Grapes, Meet Me in Las Vegas, Rogue Cop, The 5,000 Fingers of Dr. T., and The Girl Hunters. Rowland married Ruth Cummings, the niece of Louis B. Mayer and sister of Jack Cummings (MGM producer/director). They had one son, Steve Rowland, born in 1932, who later became a music producer in the UK.

== Biography ==
=== Early life ===
Roy Rowland was born in Brooklyn, the son of Russian Jewish immigrants. The family moved to Edendale, California, when Roy was ten. He graduated from the University of Southern California with a law degree before beginning his career at Metro-Goldwyn-Mayer (MGM) as a script clerk. He then began working as a prop man, grip, and assistant cameraman. In 1927 he met Ruth Cummings at the Santa Monica Beach Club. She was the niece of Louis B. Mayer and the sister of producer Jack Cummings. Her family disapproved of Rowlands, so they eloped. This resulted in Rowland being blacklisted. But Ruth Cummings arranged a rapprochement with Mayer.

He was assistant director on most of the Tarzan films, starring Johnny Weissmuller in the 1930s.

=== Short films ===
Rowland made his reputation directing short films, particularly the "How to" series of shorts starring Robert Benchley. One of them, How to Sleep (1937), won an Academy Award. He also worked with producer Pete Smith as the director of several of the short films in the Pete Smith Specialties series, and directed several of the short films in the Crime Does Not Pay series.

=== Features ===
Rowland's debut feature was A Stranger in Town (1943). He made three films with the child actress Margaret O'Brien: Lost Angel (1943), Our Vines Have Tender Grapes (1945), and Tenth Avenue Angel (1948). He also directed musicals such as Hit the Deck (1955), Meet Me in Las Vegas (1956), and Seven Hills of Rome (1958). He also made The 5,000 Fingers of Dr. T. (1953), from a story by Dr. Seuss. He directed Many Rivers to Cross with Robert Taylor and Gun Glory (1957) with Stewart Granger and Rowland's son Steve.

Rowland was survived by his wife Ruth and their son.

== Partial filmography ==
- Hollywood Party (1934) – co-director
- Sunkist Stars at Palm Springs (1936) – short
- Cinema Circus (1937) – short
- Hollywood Party (1937) – short
- Song of Revolt (1937) – short
- How to Start the Day (1937) – short
- A Night at the Movies (1937) – short film with Robert Benchley
- Music Made Simple (1938) – short
- An Evening Alone (1938) – short
- How to Raise a Baby (1938) – short
- The Courtship of the Newt (1938) – short
- How to Read (1938) – short
- How to Watch Football (1938) – short
- Opening Day (1938) – short
- Mental Poise (1938) – short
- How to Sub-Let (1939) – short
- An Hour for Lunch (1939) – short
- Dark Magic (1939) – short
- Home Early (1939) – short
- How to Eat (1939) – short
- Think First (1939) – short
- Jack Pot (1940) – short
- Please Answer (1940) – short (documentary)
- You, the People (1940) – short
- Sucker List (1941) – short
- Changed Identity (1941) – short
- A Stranger in Town (1943)
- Lost Angel (1943)
- Our Vines Have Tender Grapes (1945)
- Boys' Ranch (1946)
- The Romance of Rosy Ridge (1947)
- Killer McCoy (1947)
- Tenth Avenue Angel (1948)
- Scene of the Crime (1949)
- The Outriders (1950)
- Two Weeks with Love (1950)
- Excuse My Dust (1951)
- Bugles in the Afternoon (1952)
- The 5,000 Fingers of Dr. T. (1953)
- Affair with a Stranger (1953)
- The Moonlighter (1953)
- Rogue Cop (1954)
- Witness to Murder (1954)
- Light's Diamond Jubilee (1954, TV special, with six other directors)
- Many Rivers to Cross (1955)
- Hit the Deck (1955)
- Meet Me in Las Vegas (1956)
- These Wilder Years (1956)
- Slander (1956)
- Gun Glory (1957)
- Seven Hills of Rome (1957)
- The Life and Legend of Wyatt Earp (1959–60, TV series) – also producer
- The Girl Hunters (1963) – also writer
- Gunfighters of Casa Grande (1964)
- Man Called Gringo (1965)
- The Sea Pirate (1966) – also producer
- Il grande colpo di Surcouf (1966)
- Land Raiders (1970) – associate producer only
