= Raymond Jacobs (photographer) =

American photographer

- Born: April 26, 1923; Brooklyn, New York
- Died: March 17, 1993 (aged 69); Torrington, Connecticut
- Education: DeWitt Clinton High School
- Occupations: Photographer, Filmmaker, Businessman

Raymond Jacobs (April 26, 1923 – March 17, 1993) was an American photographer, filmmaker, and businessman.

Raymond Jacobs is primarily known for his iconic reportage photographs of New York City street scenes from the late 1940s through the mid 1960s, his portraits of celebrities and notable figures of the era such as Louis Armstrong, Salvador Dalí and Robert F. Kennedy, as well as his in-depth photographic studies of subjects like the American circus and female impersonators. Jacobs also had a successful career as a commercial advertising photographer during the 1950s- 1970s.

In the 1970s Jacobs took a pause from his photographic career and, with his wife Eleanor, popularized the countercultural footwear brand Earth Shoes through their New York based “Earth Shoe Company”.

Raymond Jacobs’ photographic archive is represented by The J. Blatt Agency LLC, New York.

== Early life ==
Jacobs began working as a mink-cutter at his father's fur business in Manhattan's Garment District at the age of 12. He attended DeWitt Clinton High School in the Bronx, where he photographed the 1939 New York World's Fair with a Brownie box camera for the student newspaper.

Jacobs enlisted in the U.S. Army and served in the Signal Corps in Europe during World War II.

== Career ==
=== Photographer ===
With an interest in photography since high school, Jacobs applied to a photography class conducted by Lisette Model at The New School. Model reviewed his portfolio and asked his profession. He replied, "I am a furrier." She told him, "You are not— you are a photographer." After studying with Model, Jacobs joined a class taught by Sid Grossman in 1953. Later in 1960, with an interest in color photography, he studied carbon print color processing with Sy Kattelson and subsequently installed color lab equipment into his own darkroom.

At the age of 30, Jacobs began a career as a freelance commercial photographer. Through his work with a number of prominent advertising agencies, he photographed campaigns for Campbell's Soup, Tareyton Cigarettes, IBM, Pan Am, Johnson & Johnson and many other major companies. Jacobs’ editorial photographs were regularly published in magazines such as Fortune, Esquire, Harper's Bazaar, McCall's, and Eros. Jacobs received over 50 Art Directors' Awards for his advertising work during this time.

Jacobs is most well known however for his personal reportage photographs of New York City street scenes taken from the mid-1940s through early 1960s and for his intimate portraits of notable figures like Louis Armstrong, Gloria Swanson, Douglas Fairbanks Jr., Salvador Dalí, Eartha Kitt, Robert F. Kennedy, Sammy Davis Jr., and Billie Holiday.

The seminal Museum of Modern Art photography curator Edward Steichen included Jacobs’ work in the groundbreaking photographic exhibition The Family of Man (January 24 – May 8, 1955) as well as in 70 Photographers Look at New York (November 27, 1957 – April 15, 1958). John Swarkowski thereafter acquired a number of Jacobs’ works for MoMA’s permanent photography collection.

Jacobs first solo exhibition was held in 1955 at Roy DeCarava's A Photographer's Gallery on the Upper West Side of New York City. According to New York Times photography critic Jacob Deschin, the exhibition primarily focused on "close-up characterizations of people in varied situations of ordinary living" and noted that Jacobs added "a new element, represented in a group of vacation landscapes and seascapes that reveal a fresh, unsuspected side to this photographer's talents."

Jacobs was one of ten photographers featured in Style in Photography in Photography Annual 1963, edited by Bruce Downes. According to Deschin, "Jacobs' portfolio of poster-like effects in manipulated images of unrealistic color provides an excitingly novel example of a successful stylistic device."

Jacobs went on to have solo exhibitions at The Limelight Gallery (1961, Greenwich Village), The Walker Art Center (1963, Minneapolis), The Washington Irving Gallery (1978, New York City), The Oliver Wolcott Library (1990, Litchfield, Connecticut), The National Arts Club (1990, New York City), The Hotchkiss School’s Tremaine Art Gallery (2006, Lakeville, Connecticut), and The Litchfield Historical Society (2016, Litchfield, Connecticut). Jacobs' work was also included in the 2007 exhibition "Lisette Model and Her Successors” at the Aperture Gallery in New York.

In 2006, Pointed Leaf Press published My New York, a monograph of Jacobs' New York City street photographs.

In 2019, one of Jacobs' iconic 1950s advertising photographs was included in the exhibition "Women on View: Aesthetics of Desire in Advertising" at Galerie 36 in Berlin.

A solo exhibition featuring almost 40 never-before-seen photographs that Jacobs made during a 1954 trip to Gaspésie, Canada opened at Musée de la Gaspésie in October 2019 and will remain on view through the end of 2021.

=== Filmmaking ===
In the 1960s, Jacobs branched into filmmaking. He co-wrote and co-produced Aroused (1966), directed by Anton Holden. Jacobs directed, co-wrote, and co-produced his second film, The Minx (1969), which starred Jan Sterling and featured an original soundtrack by The Cyrkle.

Both films were financially successful, but he left the business to concentrate on Earth Shoes.

=== Earth Shoes ===
In 1970, Jacobs and his wife Eleanor founded the Earth Shoe company to sell a negative heel shoe (the heel was lower than the toe) designed by Anna Kalsø they had discovered while traveling in Copenhagen, Denmark the previous year. Officially opening on April 22, 1970, the first Earth Day, the Jacobs' dubbed the footwear Earth Shoes. The shoes quickly became a popular countercultural symbol of the 1970s. The company expanded to 123 stores to sell the shoes, boots, and sandals, all with the negative heel design, across the United States, Canada, and Europe. By 1976 sales had grown to $14 million, but the company dissolved in 1977.

=== Later life ===
After the Earth Shoe company closed, Jacobs relocated with his family to Litchfield, Connecticut and taught photography at Litchfield's Forman School.

Jacobs died on March 17, 1993, in Torrington, Connecticut.

== Personal life ==
Jacobs married his wife Eleanor ("Ellie") in 1955. They had two daughters, Susan and Laura.
