= The Minx =

The Minx may refer to:

- The Minx (1969 film), directed by Raymond Jacobs
- The Minx (2007 film), with Mia Park
