= Henry Blair (child actor) =

American child actor

- Born: David Lewis Blakely; 1932 or 1933 (age 93–94); Los Angeles, California, United States
- Education: Chapman College
- Occupation: Actor
- Years active: 1939–1958

Henry Blair (born David Lewis Blakely; 1932 or 1933) is an American former film and radio actor.

== Early life and career ==
Born in Los Angeles, Blair is the son of Lewis Herbert Blakely and Winifred Myrtle "Winnie" Pollard, the latter a British Columbia native and a skilled performer in her own right, who—after emigrating from Vancouver to Los Angeles in 1923—founded and directed the Winifred Pollard School of Dancing from 1925 until at least 1935. The family resided in Roscoe, California, where Kevin attended the Vineland Elementary School. He later attended Hollywood Professional School and Chapman College.

Of particular note among Blair's recurring radio credits are his portrayal of Ricky Nelson on The Adventures of Ozzie and Harriet from its inception in 1944 until 1949 (at which point Nelson himself joined the cast), as well as the roles of "Donnie Henderson" on Beulah, "Skipper" on One Man's Family, "Little Quincey" on The Baby Snooks Show, "Eddie Powers" on Masquerade, and Blair's favorite among his radio characters, "Little Beaver" on Red Ryder. One especially notable non-recurring highlight was the April 29, 1947 episode of My Favorite Story, featuring Blair as the title character in Charles Dickens' Oliver Twist, as adapted for radio by Jerome Lawrence and Robert E. Lee.

On the night of February 11, 1948 (as reported the following day by The Hollywood Reporter), Blair made his 1,000th radio appearance. On February 11, 1951, Blair, along with fellow "Radiomites" Michael Blair—no relation—and Norma Jean Nilssen, were the featured guests on local disc jockey Al Jarvis's talk show on KLAC-TV in Los Angeles.

Amidst Blair's largely unsung film career, consisting principally of bit parts, often uncredited, one notable exception stands out. Zeroing in on Blair's contribution to Trail Blazers (Allied Artists' 1953 juvenile delinquency-themed second feature), the Waterloo Courier concludes its otherwise purely descriptive three-sentence review, "Henry Blair, as Spike, whose destructive prank more than once put police upon his trail, is excellent, particularly in those scenes depicting him as a reformed youngster."

Apart from Blair's radio work, notable audio-only assignments include voicing the title characters, respectively, on three albums produced by Alan Livingston: Sparky and the Talking Train, Sparky's Magic Piano, and Rusty in Orchestraville. Onscreen, he voiced the titular antagonist of MGM's 1944 animated cartoon short subject, Barney Bear's Polar Pest.

== Partial filmography ==
- Dust Be My Destiny (1939)
- Private Detective (1939) – Bobby Lannon
- Emergency Squad (1940) – Ada's son
- The House Across the Bay (1940) – Small boy who trips and falls while chasing older girl on the ferry returning from Alcatraz (uncredited)
- Abe Lincoln in Illinois (1940) – Tad Lincoln (uncredited)
- Calling Philo Vance (1940) – Hans Snauble (uncredited)
- The Doctor Takes a Wife (1940)
- Foreign Correspondent (1940) – Boy who speaks in Westminster Cathedral tower scene (uncredited)
- Wildcat Bus (1940) – Boy
- Little Nellie Kelly (1940) – Dennis, as a child
- Maisie Was a Lady (1940) – Child
- Affectionately Yours (1940) – little boy
- Blossoms in the Dust (1940) – Child (uncredited)
- Three Cheers for the Irish (1940)
- Bad Men of Missouri (1941) – Tod Dalton
- Kings Row (1942) – Willie Macintosh (uncredited)
- Yankee Doodle Dandy (1942) – George M. Cohan at 7 (uncredited)
- Busses Roar (1942) – Billy (uncredited)
- Andy Hardy's Double Life (1942) – Hardy's young friend
- Air Force (1943) – Quincannon's son
- The Adventures of Mark Twain (1944) – Boy
- Barney Bear's Polar Pest (short, 1944) – Nephew (uncredited)
- It's a Pleasure (1945) – Boy hockey player (uncredited)
- The Hucksters (1947) – Radio voice (uncredited)
- Tenth Avenue Angel (1948) – Rad Ardley
- Hills of Home (1948) – Boy (uncredited)
- The Happy Years (1950) – Joe Crocker (uncredited)
- Come Fill the Cup (1951) – Bobby, the copy boy (uncredited)
- Flesh and Fury (1952) – Student (uncredited)
- Adventures of Wild Bill Hickok
  - S3, EP15: "The Boy and the Bandit" (May 5, 1952) – Jimmy Peters
- The Winning Team (1952) – Batboy (uncredited)
- Hans Christian Andersen (1952) – Backstage Little Mermaid crew member who says "Overture in three minutes"
- Gang Busters
  - "The Duchess Spinelli Case" (1952) – Robert Gerrard
- Girls in the Night (1953) – Bit role (uncredited)
- Trail Blazers (1953) – Spike
- All I Desire (1953) – Senior (uncredited)
- Saginaw Trail (1953) – Philippe Brissac
- Francis Joins the WACS (1954) – Tommy, the bank messenger (uncredited)
- Climax!
  - S1, E4: "Sorry, Wrong Number" (November 4, 1954)
- Public Defender
  - S2, E24: "Mama's Boy" (February 10, 1955) – Jimmy
- The Halls of Ivy
  - S1, E22: "Stolen First Edition" (March 15, 1955)
- Adventures of Superman
  - S4, E2: "The Unlucky Number" (February 5, 1956) – Bobby Exbrook
- The Devil's Hairpin (1957) – Newsboy
- Father Knows Best
  - S4, E2: "A Matter of Pride" (Jun 4, 1958) – Ray
  - S5, E4: "Voice from the Past" (October 6, 1958) – Ray
  - S5, E15: "The Basketball Coach" (December 22, 1958) – Ray
