= Dick Tyler =

American actor (1932–2025)

- Born: Richard Tyler; September 23, 1932; New York City, U.S.
- Died: c. August 2025 (aged 92)
- Occupations: Actor, writer, chiropractor
- Years active: 1943–1978

Richard Tyler (September 23, 1932 – c. August 2025) was an American actor who appeared in several films and television series. He began his acting career in various theatre plays, such as Tomorrow, the World!. Tyler was reportedly a descendant of former American presidents such as John Tyler and Thomas Jefferson. He played Eddie Breen in the 1945 film The Bells of St. Mary's. His mother, Phyllis Tyler, was an actress. He appeared in other films, including The Spiral Staircase (1946) and Father Was a Fullback (1949). He played the title role of Henry Aldrich in the television series The Aldrich Family. It was his first TV appearance.

Tyler later worked as a bodybuilding writer. Having known Arnold Schwarzenegger since his arrival in the United States in 1968, Tyler was chairman on the California Board of Chiropractic Examiners when Schwarzenegger was the governor of California. He later had to step down from one of the posts due to a controversial firing. In 2004, he published his book called West Coast Bodybuilding Scene: The Golden Era.

Tyler retired from cinema in 1978. On August 5, 2025, his neighbour reported that he had died at the age of 92.

== Filmography ==
| Year | Title | Role |
|---|---|---|
| 1945 | Hotel Berlin | Bellboy #6 |
| 1945 | It's in the Bag! | Homer Floogle |
| 1945 | The Bells of St. Mary's | Eddie Breen |
| 1946 | The Spiral Staircase | Freddy |
| 1946 | Till the End of Time | Jimmy Kincheloe |
| 1948 | Tenth Avenue Angel | Jimmy Madson |
| 1949 | Father Was a Fullback | Joe Birch |
| 1953 | Battle Circus | Soldier |
| 1953 | Trail Blazers | Ben |
| 1955 | Trial | Johnson |
| 1955 | Navy Wife | Officer |
| 1955 | The Proud and Profane | Ralph |
| 1955 | Tea and Sympathy | Roger |
| 1959 | Riot in Juvenile Prison | Stu Killion |
| 1959 | The Blue Angel | Hans Keiselsack |
| 1959 | The Atomic Submarine | Frogman Carney |
| 1960 | Wake Me When It's Over | Lt. William Pincus |
| 1978 | Hooper | Doctor |
