= Our Vines Have Tender Grapes =

1945 film directed by Roy Rowland

- Theatrical poster
- Directed by: Roy Rowland
- Screenplay by: Dalton Trumbo
- Based on: For Our Vines Have Tender Grapes a 1940 novel by George Victor Martin
- Produced by: Robert Sisk
- Starring: Edward G. Robinson; Margaret O'Brien
- Cinematography: Robert Surtees
- Edited by: Ralph E. Winters
- Music by: Bronislau Kaper
- Production company: Metro-Goldwyn-Mayer
- Distributed by: Loew's Inc.
- Release date: September 6, 1945
- Running time: 105 minutes
- Country: United States
- Language: English
- Budget: $1,372,000
- Box office: $4,196,000

Our Vines Have Tender Grapes is a 1945 American drama film directed by Roy Rowland and starring Edward G. Robinson and Margaret O'Brien. It is about a Norwegian-American farming community in Wisconsin during World War II.

== Plot ==
Martinius Jacobson is a Norwegian immigrant farmer in Wisconsin, where he lives with his wife Bruna and their seven-year-old daughter Selma, who is often bedeviled by her playmate and five-year-old cousin Arnold. Martinius' primary concerns are to work his land and be a loving husband and father, though he does have one great ambition: to build a new barn.

Selma lives a carefree, joyous life, which is only temporarily clouded by the sudden death of Ingeborg Jensen, a young woman with an intellectual disability whose stern father refused her permission to attend school despite the pleas of newly arrived schoolmarm Viola Johnson.

Lightning strikes Bjorn Bjornson's newly-erected barn, and it catches fire and burns down. He loses not only the structure, but also his livestock, and faces financial ruin, as he lacked insurance. Bjornson's predicament causes Martinius to reconsider his plans, and he decides to use his savings to perform upgrades on his house. When Selma generously donates her pet calf to her impoverished neighbor, the entire community follows suit, prompting Viola to reconsider her harsh views on country life and retract her letter of resignation to the school board.

== Cast ==
- Edward G. Robinson as Martinius Jacobson
- Margaret O'Brien as Selma Jacobson
- James Craig as Nels Halverson
- Frances Gifford as Viola Johnson
- Agnes Moorehead as Bruna Jacobson
- Morris Carnovsky as Bjorn Bjornson
- Jackie "Butch" Jenkins as Arnold Hanson
- Sara Haden as Mrs. Bjornson
- Greta Granstedt as Mrs. Faraassen
- Dorothy Morris as Ingeborg Jensen
- Arthur Space as Pete Hanson
- Elizabeth Russell as Kola Hanson
- Louis Jean Heydt as Mr. Faraassen
- Charles Middleton as Kurt Jensen
- Francis Pierlot as Minister
- Johnnie Berkes as Circus Driver

== Background ==
The film is based on the 1940 novel of the same name by George Victor Martin about the Norwegian-American residents of New Hope, Wisconsin, a small farming community inspired by the real town of Benson Corners in Portage County. The screenplay was written by Dalton Trumbo, and it was his last before being blacklisted for refusing to testify before the House Un-American Activities Committee; Margaret O'Brien later said the film was largely ignored for decades because of Trumbo's political troubles.

Told from the viewpoint of little Selma (O’Brien), the film explores grand childhood adventures: making friends, a pet calf, Christmas, a terrifying trip down a flood-swollen river, a barn fire, and a ride on a circus elephant’s trunk. Its title comes from Chapter 2, Verse 15 in the Song of Solomon in the King James Version of the Bible, which reads: "Take us the foxes, the little foxes, that spoil the vines: for our vines have tender grapes." The quote is also the source of the title of the Lillian Hellman play The Little Foxes and its 1941 film adaptation.

== Reception ==
In a contemporary review for The New York Times, critic Thomas M. Pryor called the film "beautifully made", and wrote: "This is an eloquent and touchingly simple outpouring of the love in a little girl's heart ... If you can watch Margaret O'Brien's ecstatic expression without emotion then 'Our Vines Have Tender Grapes' was not meant for you." Pryor concluded his review by writing: "It is just unfortunate that this splendid entertainment had to arrive so near the end of the school vacation period, for the youngsters (not to overlook their elders) couldn't have asked for anything better."

According to MGM records, the film earned $2,770,000 domestically and $1,426,000 internationally, resulting in a profit of $1,407,000.
