= Lost Angel (film) =

1943 film by Roy Rowland

- Australian film poster
- Directed by: Roy Rowland
- Written by: Angna Enters (story); Isobel Lennart (screenplay)
- Produced by: Robert Sisk
- Starring: Margaret O'Brien; James Craig; Marsha Hunt
- Cinematography: Robert Surtees
- Edited by: Frank E. Hull
- Music by: Daniele Amfitheatrof
- Production company: Metro-Goldwyn-Mayer
- Distributed by: Loew's Inc.
- Release date: December 23, 1943
- Running time: 91 minutes
- Country: United States
- Language: English

Lost Angel is a 1943 drama film directed by Roy Rowland, starring Margaret O'Brien as a little orphan girl raised to be a genius. James Craig plays a reporter who shows her the world outside the Institute of Child Psychology.

== Plot ==
The professors of the Institute of Child Psychology raise a foundling baby, whom they name "Alpha", as an experiment to see if a scientific upbringing can create a genius. By the time she is six years old, Alpha can speak Chinese, play chess and the harp, and has studied algebra and the campaigns of Napoleon, among other things.

Newspaper reporter Mike Regan is assigned, over his protests, to write an article about her. He manages to secure an interview, despite the reluctance of the professors, and discovers that Alpha, while raised with loving care, has missed out on the joys of childhood. Disturbed by Mike's claim that magic is real, Alpha decides to investigate further and sneaks out to see Mike, leaving the confines of the institute for the first time in her life.

She enjoys the sights and sounds of New York as she makes her way to the offices of the newspaper. Mike is less than pleased to see her, but takes her along so he can keep a date with his girlfriend, nightclub singer Katie Mallory (Marsha Hunt). Alpha takes an instant dislike to Katie; it turns out that the child has a crush on Mike. However, Katie's kindness and understanding soon win Alpha over.

An outbreak of measles at the Institute and the resulting quarantine force Mike to look after Alpha for a few days. That night, escaped convicted murderer Packy Roost (Keenan Wynn) shows up at Mike's apartment. While waiting for the reporter, he and Alpha become friends. When Mike does come back, Packy demands he find Lefty Moran, who can clear him of the crime. The reporter reluctantly agrees, eventually bringing in Lefty. It turns out that Lefty is the killer; the police take him away, and Packy is exonerated.

When the professors come to reclaim their test subject, she does not want to leave Mike. However, he is unwilling to accept the responsibility and does not put up a fight for her. When Mike proposes marriage to Katie, she turns him down, citing his irresponsibility. Guilt-ridden, he gets a job transfer to Washington, DC. Meanwhile, a despondent Alpha refuses to eat or sleep. Mike has a change of heart and is reunited with both Alpha and Katie. The three leave the institute hand in hand.

== Cast ==
- Margaret O'Brien as Alpha
- James Craig as Mike Regan
- Marsha Hunt as Katie Mallory
- Philip Merivale as Professor Peter Vincent
- Henry O'Neill as Professor Josh Pringle
- Donald Meek as Professor Catty
- Keenan Wynn as Packy Roost
- Alan Napier as Dr. Woodring
- Sara Haden as Rhoda Kitterick
- Kathleen Lockhart as Mrs. Catty
- Walter Fenner as Professor Endicott
- Howard Freeman as Professor Richards
- Elisabeth Risdon as Mrs. Pringle
- Robert Blake as Jerry (as Bobby Blake), a young boy Alpha befriends
- Ava Gardner Uncredited as a Hat Check Girl
- Ray Walker as Trainer

== Adaptations ==
Lost Angel was adapted as a radio play on the June 19, 1944 and October 22, 1945, broadcasts of Lux Radio Theater and the December 18, 1946 broadcast of Academy Award Theater, each starring Margaret O'Brien.
