= You, John Jones! =

1943 film by Mervyn LeRoy

- Screenshot of title frame
- Directed by: Mervyn LeRoy
- Written by: Carey Wilson
- Produced by: Carey Wilson
- Starring: James Cagney; Ann Sothern; Margaret O'Brien
- Narrated by: Carey Wilson
- Music by: Johnny Green; Nathaniel Shilkret
- Distributed by: Metro-Goldwyn-Mayer
- Release date: January 14, 1943
- Running time: 11 minutes
- Country: United States
- Language: English

You, John Jones! (1943) is a short film directed by Mervyn LeRoy, written by Carey Wilson, and released by Metro-Goldwyn-Mayer, and starring James Cagney, Ann Sothern, and Margaret O'Brien. The film credits the War Activities Committee of the Motion Picture Industry for its production. The title frame also says "Produced by Metro-Goldwyn-Mayer as their contribution to United Nations Week".

== Plot ==
The film begins with a father and worker (Cagney) working at an armaments factory, until he finally gets off and goes home. When he is at home, he is interrupted from listening to his daughter's recitation of Abraham Lincoln's Gettysburg Address to go out for the Civil Defense on an air-raid patrol. When he is out at his post he feels a little silly being there, as no air raids have hit America, though they have hit America's allies.

He then goes off into a dream sequence, narrated by God, about the various areas in which air raids and other violence has been brought on civilians, by air and other means. Each vignette ends with a small child dead or wounded and the narrator asking him, what if it was "your baby, John Jones, your baby" the dream sequence ends with an air attack, after which Jones finally awakes. He returns to his house and his daughter finishes the recitation of the Gettysburg Address "...so that government by the people, for the people, and of the people shall not perish from this Earth."

== Cast ==
- James Cagney as John Jones
- Ann Sothern as Mary Jones
- Margaret O'Brien as Daughter
- Beal Wong as Japanese Soldier (uncredited)
