= Trail Blazers (film) =

1953 film

- Film poster
- Directed by: Wesley Barry
- Written by: Samuel Roeca; Jack Marks
- Produced by: Wesley Barry
- Starring: Alan Hale Jr. Richard Tyler; Lyle Talbot
- Cinematography: John J. Martin
- Edited by: Ace Herman
- Music by: Edward J. Kay
- Production company: Newhall Productions
- Distributed by: Allied Artists Pictures
- Release date: April 1, 1953
- Running time: 63 minutes
- Country: United States
- Language: English

Trail Blazers is a 1953 drama film directed by Wesley Barry and starring Alan Hale Jr., Richard Tyler and Lyle Talbot. It was produced as a second feature and released by Allied Artists.

== Plot ==
Concerned about the level of juvenile delinquency in his California town, a man establishes a youth club for boys. While taking them on an expedition to the mountains they encounter two dangerous escaped convicts.

== Cast ==
- Alan Hale Jr. as Roger Stone
- Richard Tyler as Ben
- Barney McCormack as Feathers
- Jim Flowers as Pudge
- Henry Blair as Spike
- Robert Hyatt as Jim
- Danny Welton as Mike
- Mickey Colpack as Andy
- Duke York as Angus
- Lyle Talbot as Deputy Sheriff McLain
- Rick Vallin as Officer Lundig

== Bibliography ==
- Martin, Len D. The Allied Artists Checklist: The Feature Films and Short Subjects of Allied Artists Pictures Corporation, 1947-1978. McFarland & Company, 1993.
