= Midtown Y Photography Gallery =

American nonprofit photography gallery in New York 1972-1996

Midtown Y Photography Gallery was a pioneering nonprofit organisation in New York that offered photographers an opportunity to publicly exhibit their work. The Gallery ran from 1972 until 1996 directed in turn by photographers Larry Siegel, Sy Rubin and Michael Spano.

== Establishment ==
Larry Siegel, with the help of Robert Menschel and NYSCA, founded the Midtown Y Photography Gallery in 1972 as a corridor gallery at the Emanu-El Midtown YM-YWHA on 14th Street. Larry Siegel had previously established the Image Gallery, which along with Helen Gee’s Limelight Gallery was one of the few venues in New York City, apart from the Museum of Modern Art, that held photography exhibitions in the 1950s and early 1960s.

== Purpose ==
Though it occasionally showed historical photographs, and established contemporary practitioners such as David Attie and Robert Giard during its first decade, the Midtown Y Photography Gallery concentrated on promoting the work of emerging artists. It issued open calls for participation in large thematic exhibitions but most often selected exhibitors by conducting portfolio reviews, the work being shown alongside that of one or two other photographers. For most, this was their first “solo” exposure in New York or their first public display of work. Some returned subsequently to show later work.

== Exhibitions 1973–1993 ==
- April 18–May 30, 1973 Barbara Walz
- 29 January–24 February 1975, Harry Lapow, Coney Island
- April 6–April 29, 1975 John Messina
- November 22–December 18, 1977, Fred Casden: The Zoo
- December 28, 1977–January 22,1978, The Recent Work of John Ganis
- December 28, 1977–January 22, 1978, The Recent Work of Mark Schwartz
- 1978 (n.d.) Harvey Stein
- November 1–November 26, 1978, Nathan Farb, Soviets: Photographs of the Russian People
- January 4–January 28, 1979, Robert Giard: Grounds
- October 24–November 18, 1979, David Attie: Russians and Americans Photographing Themselves
- May 29–August 15, 1980, Four Photographers from the Visual Arts Referral Service CAPS
- September 17–October 18, 1981, Color Photography in the Urban Environment' Todd Weinstein- Patrick D. Pagnano
- December 17, 1981–January 10, 1982, Photographs by Larry Chatman
- October 22–November 15, 1981, Michael Spano
- March 3–March 27, 1983, Recent Photographs by Louis Stettner
- October 6–October 30, 1983, William E. Williams: Philadelphia Parties and Portraits
- October 6–October 30, 1983, Photographs by Arlene Gottfried
- December 15, 1983–January 15, 1984, Quince Anos
- January 19–February 19, 1984, Platinum and Palladium
- March 22–April 22, 1984, Two Photographers
- May 3–June 3, 1984, Extended Frames
- September 20–November 4, 1984, Geoffrey Biddle: Loisaida: The Spanish Lower East Side Photographs
- January 17–February 17, 1985, Photographs by John Lueders-Booth
- February 21–March 24, 1985, Photographs by Ed Grazda
- June 6–August 4, 1985, Photographs by Dory E. Thanhauser
- December 12, 1985–January 19, 1986, View Camera Suburban Scenes
- February 27–March 30,1986, Douglas Sandhage: Thailand
- February 27–March 30, 1986, Marke Webb: Texas Communities
- May 15–June 15, 1986, Ann Chamberlain: Color Interiors
- June 19–July 27, 1986, Henry Horenstein: Sports Photographs
- November 6–December 7, 1986, Vivian Ronay: Astoria
- November 6–December 7, 1986, Dawoud Bey: Urban Photographs
- January 23–February 23, 1986, Roy Colmer: Photographs of People
- December 11, 1986–January 18, 1987, Roy Greer : Diana, Snow Pictures
- December 11, 1986–January 18, 1987, People of Granby, CT
- April 2–May 3, 1987, Incorporating T.V.
- April 2–May 3, 1987, Sidney Kerner: Faces in the Street
- October 1–November 8, 1987, Takagi Madoka: Platinum Portraits
- September 22–October 23, 1988, Abelardo Morell: Still Lifes
- September 22–October 23, 1988, John Milisenda: Portrait of My Brother
- March 23–April 23, 1989, Mary Kocol: Interiors
- January 11–February 11, 1990, Ari Marcopoulos: Urban Scenes
- February 15–March 18, 1990, Anderson Scott: Rural Oddities
- September 27–October 28, 1990, Sage Sohier: At Home with Themselves
- March 21–April 21, 1991, Timothy Feresten: Color Photographs
- April 8–May 9, 1993, Mary Berridge: Teenage Mother Series

== Archive ==
The Midtown Y Photography Gallery Archive, bequeathed to The New York Public Library in 1998, is housed in the Photography Collection of The Miriam and Ira D. Wallach Division of Art, Prints and Photographs, and in the Manuscripts and Archives Division.
