= A Photographer's Gallery =

Gallery in New York City

Coordinates: 40.78513°N 73.97152°W

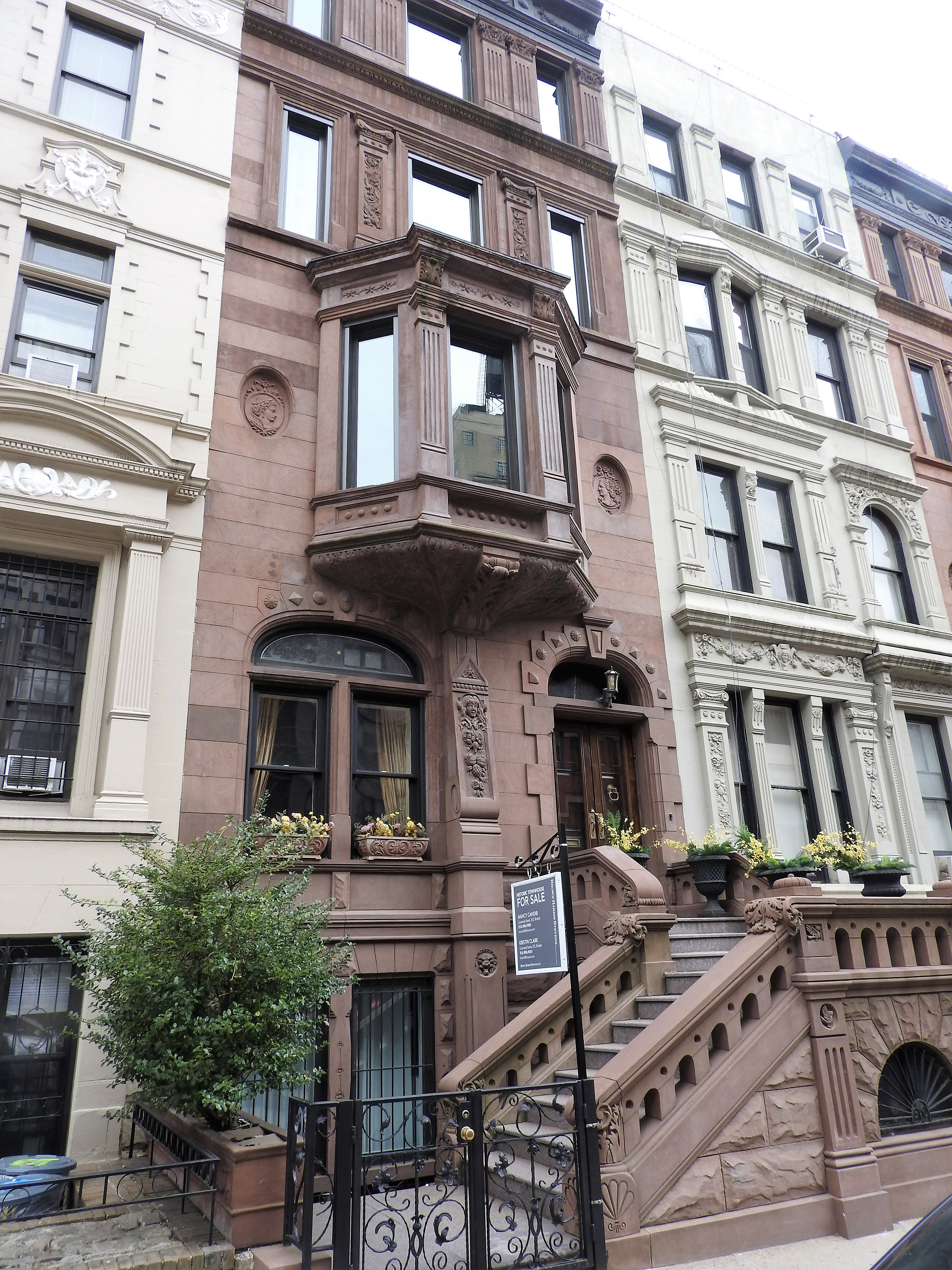

A Photographer's Gallery (March 1955 – 1957), 48 West 85th Street, on the Upper West Side of Manhattan in New York City, founded and opened by Roy DeCarava, was an early effort to gain recognition for photography as an art form. It exhibited art photography intended for walls in homes, and offices, along with paintings.

== Exhibitions ==
Exhibitions at A Photographer's Gallery lasted four to six weeks, unusual at the time. Roy DeCarava believed that artists deserved an opportunity to have their work interact with as broad an audience as possible. To that end, he was committed to showing exhibitions in an environment that was respectful to the artists and thus had a dedicated, clean wall gallery space.

There were a number of one-man exhibitions, but most of the time the gallery featured group shows, giving both new and more established photographers the opportunity to show, and to interact with, others in the exhibition process.

== Photographers ==
Some of the photographers who were exhibited at A Photographer's Gallery, in addition to Roy DeCarava, were: Berenice Abbott, Hugh Bell, Hal Berg, Ruth Bernhard, Lou Bernstein, Harry Callahan, Van Deren Coke, Rufus Graham, Sid Grossman, Scott Hyde, Raymond Jacobs, Art Kane, Harry Lapow, Leon Levenstein, Ralph Eugene Meatyard (whose national career was established by his exhibition at the gallery), Jay Maisel, Lisette Model, David Vestal, Dan Weiner, Minor White, and Tad Yamashiro.

There were other participating photographers, but the guest book that contained all exhibition invitations (and signatures of guests) was recently lost. Invitations to the exhibitions were usually designed by the photographer being exhibited. However, Roy DeCarava designed several invitations, since he had an extensive graphic arts background.

== The gallery ==
The gallery was housed in a traditional New York City brownstone building on the ground level, and had its own entrance. This was an apartment that DeCarava and his then wife, Anne, converted utilizing more than 500 square feet (46 m^{2}) of white walls, with a tall free-standing room divider, that added considerably more gallery wall space.

This arrangement enabled him to support the gallery inasmuch as sales were slight and prints sold for very little. However, a seasonal group show designed to encourage the purchase of signed, and sometimes numbered, photographic prints for Christmas gifts was exceptionally successful.

Roy DeCarava always believed that art should be available and affordable to all people and so his commissions were kept low, generally 10% or less of the sale price. He continued exhibiting his own work during that period while also holding a 9 to 5 job in an ad agency.

The gallery closed in June 1957 after the marriage of DeCarava to Anne Strasser ended in divorce. She later remarried and became Anne Kurakin. Roy DeCarava went on to have a world-renowned career as an artist
