= Harry Lapow =

American photographer

Harry Lapow (February 6, 1909 – September 14, 1982) was an American photographer and graphic designer.

== Career ==
Born in Newark, New Jersey, in 1909, Lapow took art classes while in high school and after graduation, aged 15 he trained in commercial art before in 1934 he moved to New York City to work for package designer Martin Ullman and married Ruth Benzer in February that year. Lapow registered for the US Army draft in October 1940.

Until 1957 he and seven others operated as Koodin-Lapow, with Ben Koodin directing selling, and he in charge of packaging design for R. H. Macys, Wamsutta Mills, Seagram, Startex and Rokeach, among others. He set up on his own as Harry Lapow Associates in 1960, seeking more freedom for his photography, and added clients including Peter Pan Foundations.

After the War as the business expanded they hired young Cooper Union graduates Milton Glaser, Seymour Chwast and Edward Sorel. He was one of 13 founding members of the Package Designers Council. In a 1957 newspaper article he described trends of visibility and 'buy-me' designs in packaging as overworked clichés, advocating instead for consideration by designers of 'bagability,' easy opening and dispensing of contents, portability and 'giftability.' By the mid-1960s he was corporate design director with the firm Lehn & Fink Products Corporation from 1962 and wrote articles for the journal Packaging Design on a variety of topics including the use of flocked paper, the role of research in packaging design, and expressed concerns about the 1967 US Federal Fair Packaging and Labeling Act, complaining that it would "play havoc with our designs."

== Photographer ==
Lapow took courses with his near-contemporaries Lisette Model and Sid Grossman at The New School for Social Research together with his good friend, Leon Levinstein, using a second-hand 6x6 twin-lens reflex Ciroflex camera that he received for his forty-third birthday in 1952, Asked what he was looking for to photograph, he replied "I don't look for anything; the photograph looks for me. When I see something I have to shoot it."

During the 1960s Lapow studied painting with Evsa Model, Lisette's husband, but he continued photographing, mostly at Coney Island, in spare time available from his career in package design;

Coney Island is like a piece of candy for me. I've been to a lot of beaches--Miami, Morocco, Sardinia, Atlantic City--but Coney Island is the amazing place. I don't know why, and I don't want to know why, but these people appeal to me.

Among his several portrait subjects was Victor Perera, and he traveled to photograph desert people of North Africa, Crow people in Montana, Canada's Gaspé fishermen, farmers in Sicily, and Sardinian shepherds, with work published in Industrial Design magazine, New York magazine, the New York Times and the Washington Post.

== Recognition ==
For over 25 years, between 1952 and 1977, Lapow took photographs of Coney Island, as both Model and Grossman did, and as other significant photographers had, including Weegee.

One of Lapow's early photographs of an Italian wedding on the beach at Coney Island was selected by Edward Steichen for The Family of Man exhibition at the Museum of Modern Art, that toured the world and was seen by 9 million visitors. Jerry Mason's follow-up publication The Family of Women of 1979 included Lapow's photograph of an older woman wheeling her bicycle.

He traveled widely, photographing in small fishing villages in Nova Scotia, farming and fishing communities in the Gaspé Peninsula of Québec, a Crow Nation reservation in Montana, the Magdalen Islands, Prince Edward Island, and later, in Morocco, Sardinia, and Italy.

Helen Gee gave Lapow his first exhibition at her Limelight Gallery in Greenwich Village in 1959. He also showed in group exhibitions at A Photographer's Gallery, New York, Washington, DC, Photokina in Cologne, Vu Par Cultural Center in Paris, and at Expo 67, Montreal, Canada. In 1970 he held a joint show at Ashland College devoted to Coney Island with poet Mark McCloskey in which the latter showed verse in black-on-gray panels interspersed by Lapow's monochrome photographs. The show followed another early that year which included the two at the State University College at Potsdam Lapow presented lectures on his work, including on at the State University College in 1975, and at Tompkins Cortland Community College in 1978.

In 1978 Dover Publications published a book of his Coney Island work, Coney Island Beach People, one hundred and thirty-eight full-page or slightly cropped medium-format images arranged for their visual connections rather than chronologically. In his introduction, David Toor writes that;

Harry Lapow concentrates on individuals and small groups. He uses the sand, sea, sky and the shape of the individual to create negative space, abstract form, striking composition. He emphasizes the interplay and repetition of shapes created by the subjects and the background, the shadows on the sand, the reflections in the water.

John Gabree, reviewing it for Newsday remarks that;

Sometimes the human beings who inhabit Harry Lapow's Coney Island look less like people than like geological phenomena, mountains especially, or rocks strewn on the beach. Other times, in their grotesque poses, they are like sculptures. With their noses covered and sunglasses, many resemble creatures from Mars. Lapow creates beauty rather than capturing it. No lively creatures in bikinis grace his pictures...And yet there is extraordinary beauty in these photographs.

Fotofolio, the postcard company, distributed several Lapow images. Robert L. Pincus, reviewing Lapow's 1981 joint show with John Brumfield and Lou Stoumen at G. Ray Hawkins Gallery in Los Angeles considered that it was;

...his photographs of the '70s that seem most confident and perceptive. A 1975 portrait of two elderly women in bathing caps strolling along the shoreline is particularly poignant; both their halting stances and facial expressions, caught unaware, are effectingly vulnerable.

== Exhibitions ==
=== Solo ===
- 1959: solo show at Limelight Gallery, Greenwich Village, New York
- 1975, 29 January–24 February Coney Island. Midtown Y Gallery, New York.

=== Group and joint ===
- 1955: The Family of Man, MoMA (Museum of Modern Art), New York
- 1970, February: Andre Billeci (glass), Linda Plotkin (prints) Harry Lapow (photographs), Mark McKoskey (poetry). Fine art gallery State University College at Potsdam
- 1970, 13–30 October: Coney Island, Lapow and poet Mark McCloskey. Ashland College
- 1971, March: Photographs by Harry Lapow and poems by Mark MeCioskey. Fine Arts Gallery at the State University of New York at Oneonta
- 1981, 3 May–6 June: John Brumfield. Harry Lapow, Lou Stoumen, photography. G. Ray Hawkins Gallery, 7224 Melrose Ave. Los Angeles
- 1982, 7–31 December: Recent Photographs: Michelle Dearborn and Harry Lapow. Focus Gallery, San Francisco

=== Posthumous ===
==== Solo ====
- 1984, to 4 July: Coney Island Beach People. Scheinbaum & Russek Gallery of Photography, Santa Fe
- 1986:Harry Lapow's Coney Island, Museum of Photography, Corridor Gallery, George Eastman House
- 2002: Coney Island Beach People: photographs by Harry Lapow, Klotz/Sirmon Gallery, 511 West 25th Street, New York

==== Group ====
- 1980; January: 12 Brooklyn photographers, Lou Bernstein, Mark Boritz, Wayne Clark, Laimute E. Druskis, Alan Forman, Thomas Germano, Barry Gerson, Roger Haile. Harry Lapow, Arnold Meisner, Marilyn Nance and Neil Trager. Community Gallery of the Brooklyn Museum
- 2007: Alida Fish, Harry Lapow, Robert Richfield, Alan Klotz Gallery, USA
- 2015/16: Forever Coney: Photographs from the Brooklyn Museum Collection, Brooklyn Museum of Art, New York
- 2018: New Acquisitions, Alan Klotz Gallery, USA
- Ongoing: The Family of Man, UNESCO Memory of the World, Steichen Collections, Clervaux Castle, Luxembourg

== Collections ==
- Museum of Modern Art, New York
- Metropolitan Museum of Art, New York
- Museum of the City of New York, New York
- Brooklyn Museum, Brooklyn, New York
- G. Ray Hawkins Gallery
- The Smithsonian Institution, Washington, D.C.
- Houston Museum of Fine Arts, Houston, TX
- Musée Des Beaux-Arts Du Canada

== Publications ==
- Lapow, Harry (1978). Coney Island beach people. New York: Dover Publications. ISBN 9780486236148. OCLC 4123375.

== Legacy ==
Still photographing at 67 and living in Greenwich Village, Lapow was vocal in widely-syndicated articles in the press and on television the in mid-1970s against ageism and enforced retirement. His wife Ruth died in 1979. He was survived by his folk-singer son Gary in Berkeley, for whose album Bamboo in the Wind Harry photographed the cover, and daughter, the artist/designer Marcelle Lapow Toor, whose husband SUNY English lecturer David wrote the introduction to the 1978 Dover monograph, and who until her death in 2009 was executor for Lapow's estate and maintained his archive. In 1983, son Gary produced a special performance at La Peña Cultural Center in Berkeley, incorporating projections of Harry's Coney Island imagery, and remembered his father's encouragment to "be creative."

== External links ==
- Harry Lapow website
