= George Victor Martin =

American writer

- Born: December 16, 1900; Chicago, Illinois
- Died: November 26, 1959 (aged 58); Saranac Lake, New York
- Occupation: Writer

George Victor Martin (December 16, 1900 – November 26, 1959) was an American writer best known for the novel For Our Vines Have Tender Grapes.

== Life ==
George Victor Martin was born on December 16, 1900, in Chicago, Illinois. A gifted pianist, he was awarded a scholarship to the Chicago Musical College at age 12, but had to drop out due to a stammer.

=== Writing career ===
After a career as nightclub pianist, during which he accompanied Helen Morgan, Martin took up writing in his 30s. One short story was adapted into the 1940 Tex Ritter western film Pals of the Silver Sage.

He published three books. His first, For Our Vines Have Tender Grapes, is about Norwegian-American farmers in a small Wisconsin community. He wrote part of the novel while he was employed by the Federal Writers' Project. Dalton Trumbo adapted the book for the MGM film Our Vines Have Tender Grapes in 1945. His estranged wife, Selma Martin, with Arnold Hansen, sued Martin after the film was released, claiming that the story was of her life and that its being told caused her to undergo undue attention and humiliation; the outcome of the lawsuit is unknown.

Martin published two more novels: The Bells of St. Mary's, the novelization of the popular film, and Mark It with a Stone. In a largely positive review for The New York Times, Anne Richards wrote of its "freshness and vigor".

According to Martin's obituary, he had submitted a manuscript for a book called Sans Sex and Murder to his agent shortly before he died, though it apparently never was published.

=== Death ===
On November 26, 1959, Martin died by suicide at Will Rogers Memorial Hospital in Saranac Lake, New York. He had suffered from tuberculosis for years, and friends had noticed he had been in a depressed mood at times. He was divorced and survived by a daughter, Sybil Penelope, at the time of his death.

== Works ==
- For Our Vines Have Tender Grapes. Grosset & Dunlap, 1940. Later published with a slightly different title, Our Vines Have Tender Grapes.
- The Bells of St. Mary's. Grosset & Dunlap, 1946.
- Mark It with a Stone (1947). Published in paperback as The Evil That Men Do and in a revised form as the Avon monthly novel with the title The Lady Said Yes.
