= Roots Canada =

Canadian apparel and home furnishings company

Roots Corporation
- Type: Public
- Traded as: TSX: ROOT
- Industry: Retail
- Founded: Toronto, Ontario, Canada
- Founders: Michael Budman and Don Green
- Headquarters: Toronto, Ontario, Canada
- Number of locations: 114 Canadian stores, 7 American stores and 150 + partner-operated locations in Asia
- Areas served: Canada, United States, Asia
- Key people: Meghan Roach (CEO)
- Products: Apparel, leather goods, active athletic wear, yoga wear, accessories, home furnishings
- Revenue: ▲ C$ 329.865 million (2019)
- Operating income: ▼ -C$56.918 million (2019)
- Net income: ▼ -C$62.029 million (2019)
- Total assets: ▲ C$ 440. 774 million (2019)
- Total equity: ▼ C$ 150.506 million (2019)
- Owner: Searchlight Capital Partners (majority stake); Budman & Green (minority stake)
- Number of employees: 2,000 in Canada
- Website: roots.com

Roots Corporation is a publicly traded Canadian brand that sells apparel, leather bags, small leather goods, footwear, athletic wear, and home furnishings. The company was founded in 1973 in Toronto, Ontario, by Michael Budman and Don Green. In 2015, Roots was sold to Searchlight Capital Partners LP, an American private equity firm.

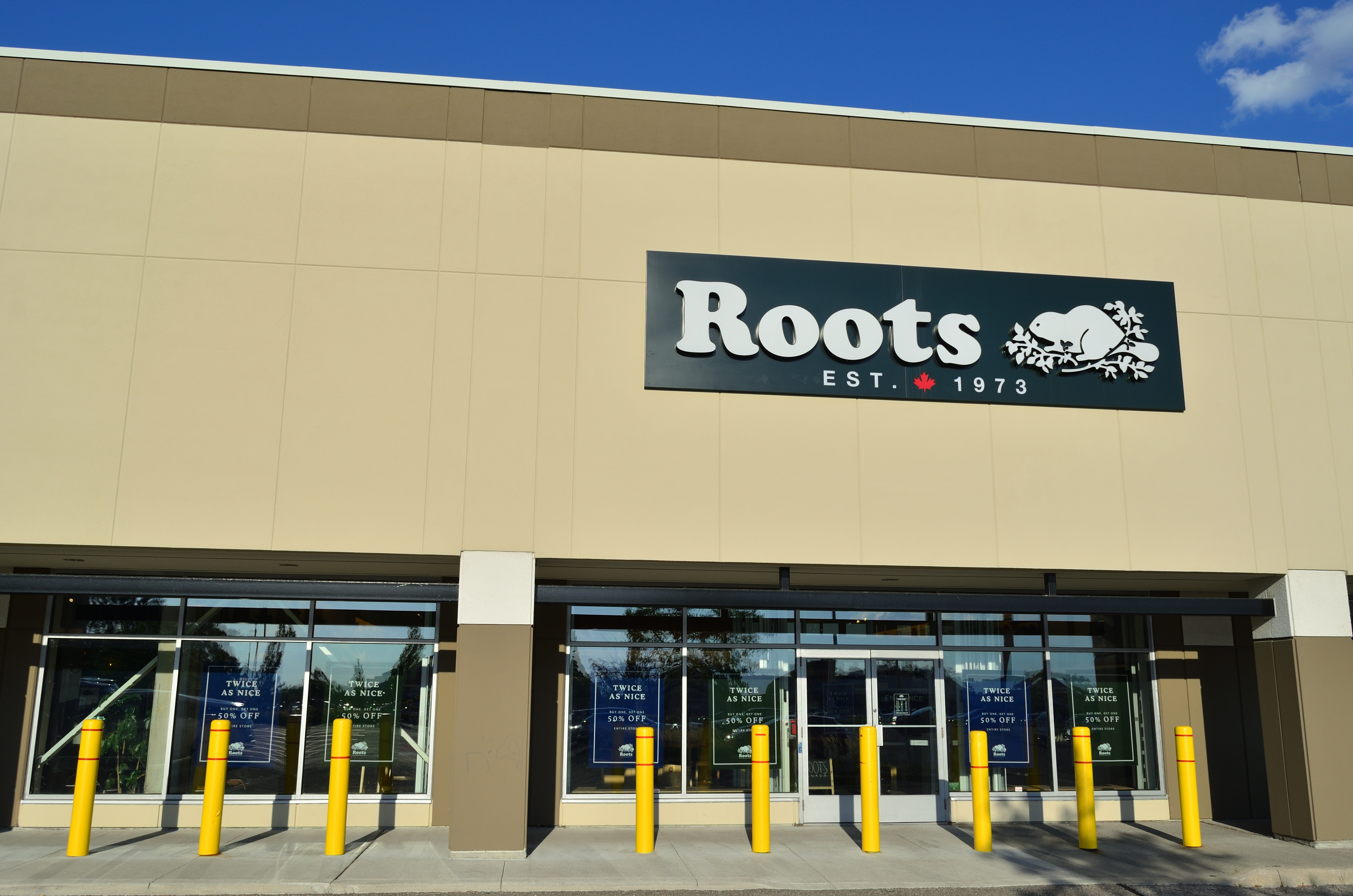
Roots in Markham, Canada

The company's design centre and leather factory are in Toronto, Ontario. Roots reportedly has approximately 2,000 employees in Canada. Roots factories exist globally, however, details of these factories are not disclosed by the parent company.

Roots started using the beaver logo in 1985 with the launch of their athletic brand. The logo was designed in the 1970s by graphic artists Heather Cooper and Robert Burns. The logo features a beaver, the national animal of Canada, on top of tree branches. The typography of the company name below is set in the Cooper font created by Oswald Cooper in 1919.

== History ==
In 1973, Michael Budman and Don Green founded Roots, initially a footwear company that sold negative-heel shoes, before expanding their products. The Kowalewski family and their family business, the Boa Shoe Company, were the first makers of Budman and Green's negative-heel shoes, which became Roots' defining product. In August 1973, Roots opened its first store on Yonge St. near the Rosedale subway station in Toronto. A couple of months later, Roots bought the Upin and Ipin Company and opened their own leather factory. By the end of 1973, Roots had stores in Toronto, Vancouver, Montreal, and several U.S. locations.

Roots' negative-heel shoes "competed" with similar shoes sold by Kalsø Earth Shoe, which had first entered the North American market in 1970. Experts express varying opinions on whether negative-heel shoes are good or bad for one's feet.

== Expansion ==
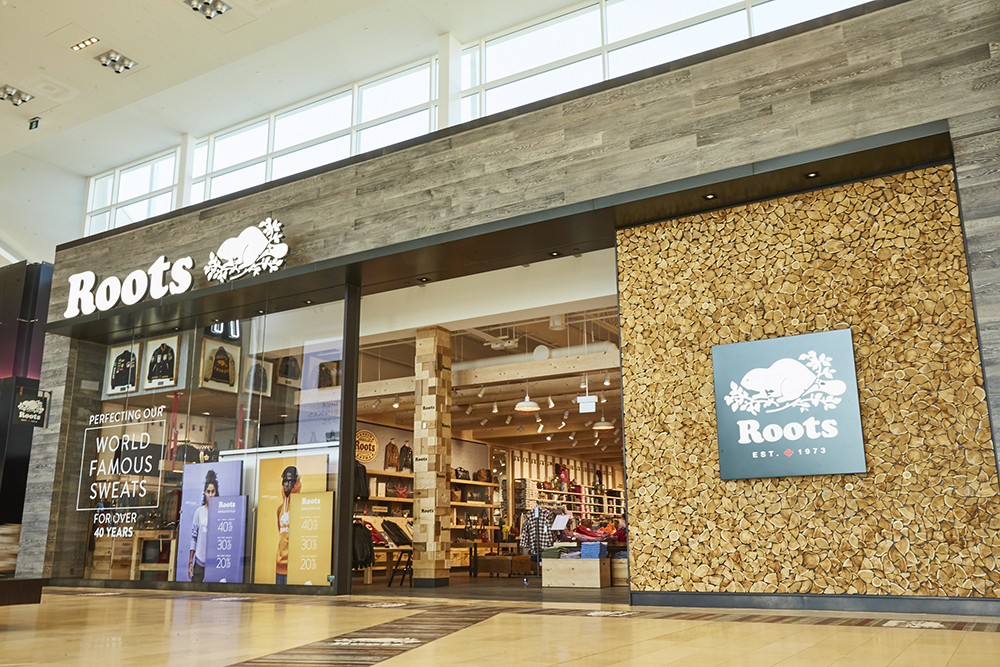
Roots store in Yorkdale Mall, Toronto

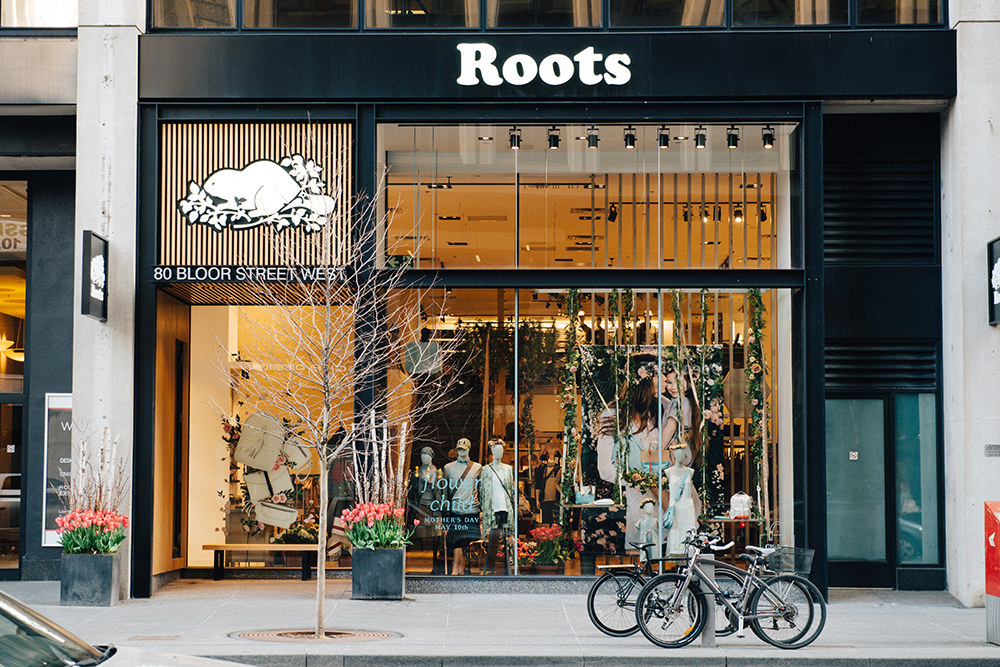
Roots store on Bloor St. in Toronto

As the demand for Roots' negative-heel shoes continued, the Roots factory expanded. By the fall of 1975, the factory that had made only 30 pairs of shoes a day was making more than 2,000. Later that year, Roots decided to experiment with casual apparel.

By 1977, Roots had expanded to 65 retail outlets across North America and Europe and 250 employees. Roots then began the transition from making negative-heel shoes to making footwear with a wedge sole, and introduced classic handbags to their lineup. The company began wholesaling bags, footwear, belts, and leather jackets to Canadian retailers like Eaton’s and Holt Renfrew, and U.S. retailers such as Saks Fifth Avenue, Bloomingdales, and Nordstrom. Roots continued to expand its product line by introducing Roots Design in 1979, their first line of men's tailored clothing. This line started with leather jackets that were produced in a small building in Port Credit, Mississauga.

By the end of 1980, with the closing of many stores in the U.S. and Europe, Roots began to expand in Canada. The expansion launched the manufacturing of T-shirts and sweatshirts on a small scale, and the creation of the brand's label Beaver Canoe, a joint venture canoe building operation with Camp Tamakwa's co-founder Omer Stringer. Clothing and outdoor items were then created under the Beaver Canoe brand in 1983. Two years later, Roots launched Roots Beaver Athletics (RBA) with the beaver logo and by the early 1990s, the logo had appeared on more than a million garments.

Roots began to expand in Asia in 1993, starting with two stores in Japan, where negative heel shoes had a resurgent popularity and continued to expand throughout the 1990s and early 2000s. Although Roots stores have closed in Asia, Roots began to expand in Taiwan and China in the 2000s. Over the years, these stores expanded their product offering to include apparel as well as leather goods, kids apparel, and home furnishings. Roots Taiwan launched a separate website in 2011. As of May 2013, Roots had 75 retail outlets in Taiwan and 16 in China, but with plans for full closure.

=== Roots Air ===
In 2001, the company was involved with the creation of a new Canadian discount airline, Roots Air. The new discount airline was created in 2000 and service began in March 2001, but was suspended in May 2001 when Air Canada acquired a 30% equity interest and 50% voting stake in Roots Air operator Skyservice. All flights involving Roots Air were transferred to Air Canada. Roots Air served the Canadian cities of Vancouver, Calgary and Toronto. Service to Los Angeles was cancelled prior to launch. They operated three Airbus A320 jetliners in scheduled passenger service and had leased a Boeing 727 from Kelowna Flightcraft. An Airbus A330 had been planned to enter service but the airline ceased operations before it could be put into revenue service.

== Olympics ==
Roots contributed to the Olympic games in 1976, providing 200 quilted “Puff” boots to the Canadian Team at the Winter Games in Innsbruck, Austria. In 1988, Roots provided Jamaica's Olympic bobsled team with custom made jackets. The story was made famous by the 1993 hit movie Cool Runnings starring John Candy, who wore a Roots jacket. Roots created a special retail collection of clothes in honour of the 1994 Canadian Olympic team, under the banner "Roots Salutes the Canadian Olympic Team." Roots designed a jacket for the Norwegian skier and Olympic Gold medalist Stein Eriksen for the 1994 Winter Olympics in Lillehammer.

In 1998, Roots began its formal Olympic involvement, outfitting the Canadian team at the Winter Games in Nagano, Japan. The outfit's most popular item was the red “poorboy” cap (or poor boy cap) worn backwards, which were seen on celebrities such as Prince William and P. Diddy. Roots at one point sold 100,000 of these berets a day at US$19.95 apiece, eventually selling over half a million caps.

Roots went on to be the official outfitter for members of the Canadian Olympic and Paralympic Teams from 2000 to 2004, and was the official outfitter for the Canadian Speed Skating Team in 2006. Roots outfitted the United States Olympic and Paralympic Teams in 2002, 2004, and 2006. Other teams Roots outfitted include the British Olympic Team (2002, 2004), and the Barbados Olympic Team (2004).

In 2005, Roots was outbid on the Canadian Olympic contract by the Hudson's Bay Company (sold through The Bay and Zellers), and in 2008 the USOC replaced Roots with Polo Ralph Lauren. The USOC had a disagreement with Roots over the direction of the athletes' uniforms, but it is also suggested Roots did not want its brand to be involved with the 2008 Summer Olympics, which saw much political controversy over human rights.

== Recent history ==
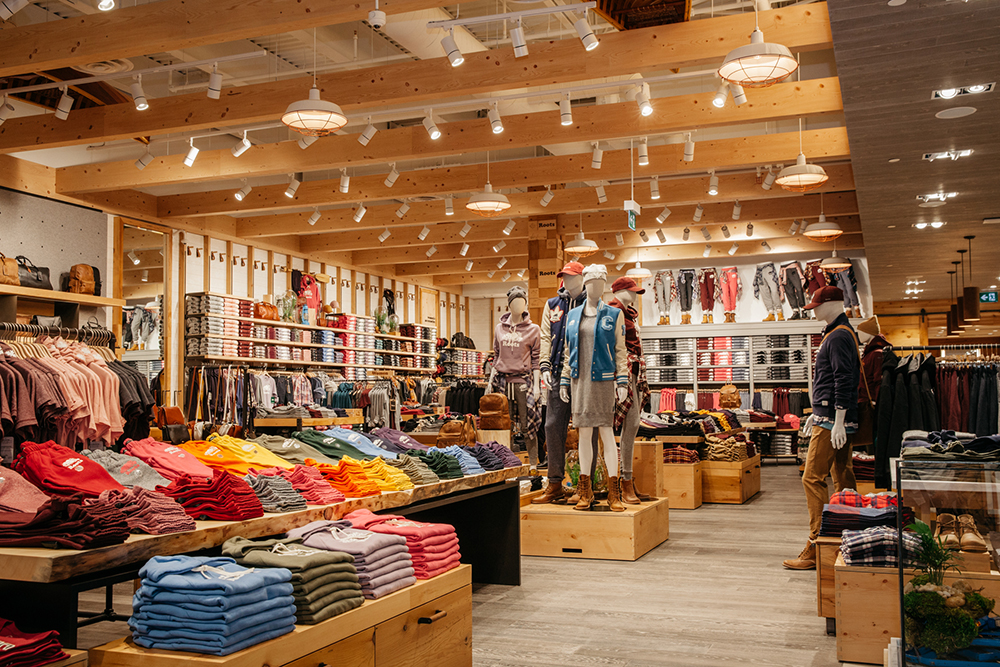
Roots' famous sweats on display

Roots has 120 stores in North America, including five flagship stores in Canada in Toronto, Vancouver, and Montreal. Other notable locations include Rosedale in Toronto, and Chinook and West Edmonton Mall in Alberta. In 2013, Roots opened locations in Montreal and Niagara Falls. In 2014, the large two-story Bloor St. location, which was known for holding many events, downsized to a new location on the same street.

Also in 2014, after years of running the business, Michael Budman and Don Green hired a president and chief operating officer, Wendy Bennison, who was previously vice president of Mark's Work Warehouse.

In 2015, Roots was sold to Searchlight Capital LP, which now holds a majority stake with the founders retaining a minority stake.

Jim Gabel joined in February 2016 as the president of Roots Canada. He left the company in January 2020. In May 2020, the board of directors appointed Meghan Roach as chief executive officer.

In September 2017, the company filed for an initial public offering on the Toronto Stock Exchange.

On April 29, 2020, Roots Corp. announced the shutdown of its stores in Boston, Washington, and Chicago, and a pop-up store in New York. Two stores in Michigan and Utah will remain open. Its subsidiary Roots USA Corp. will be liquidated through a Chapter 7 bankruptcy filing. Sales to U.S. customers will continue through e-commerce.

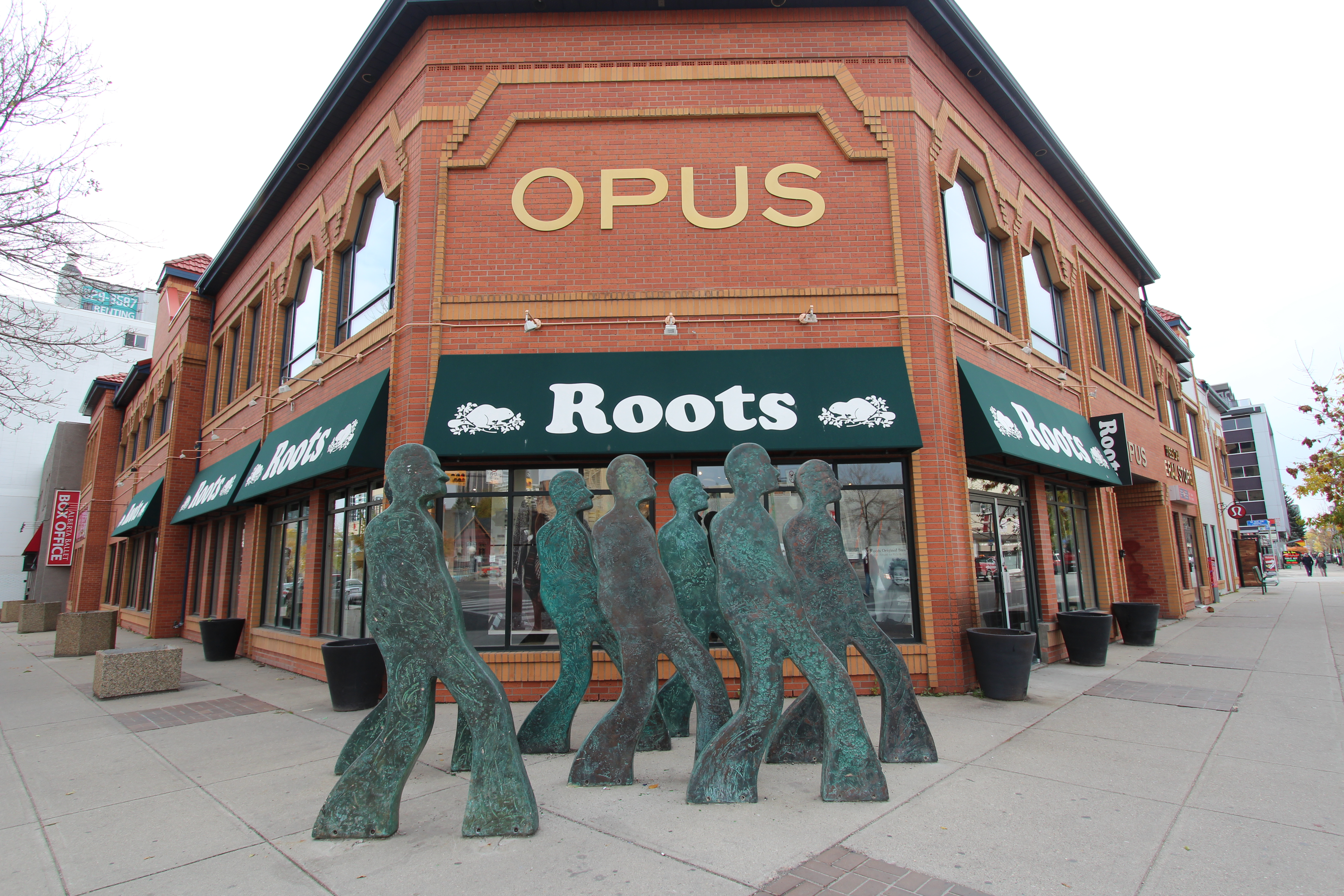
Roots in Calgary Alberta, on 17th Avenue SW

In March 2026, Roots announced it is reviewing strategic alternatives, including a potential sale of the company to maximize shareholder value.

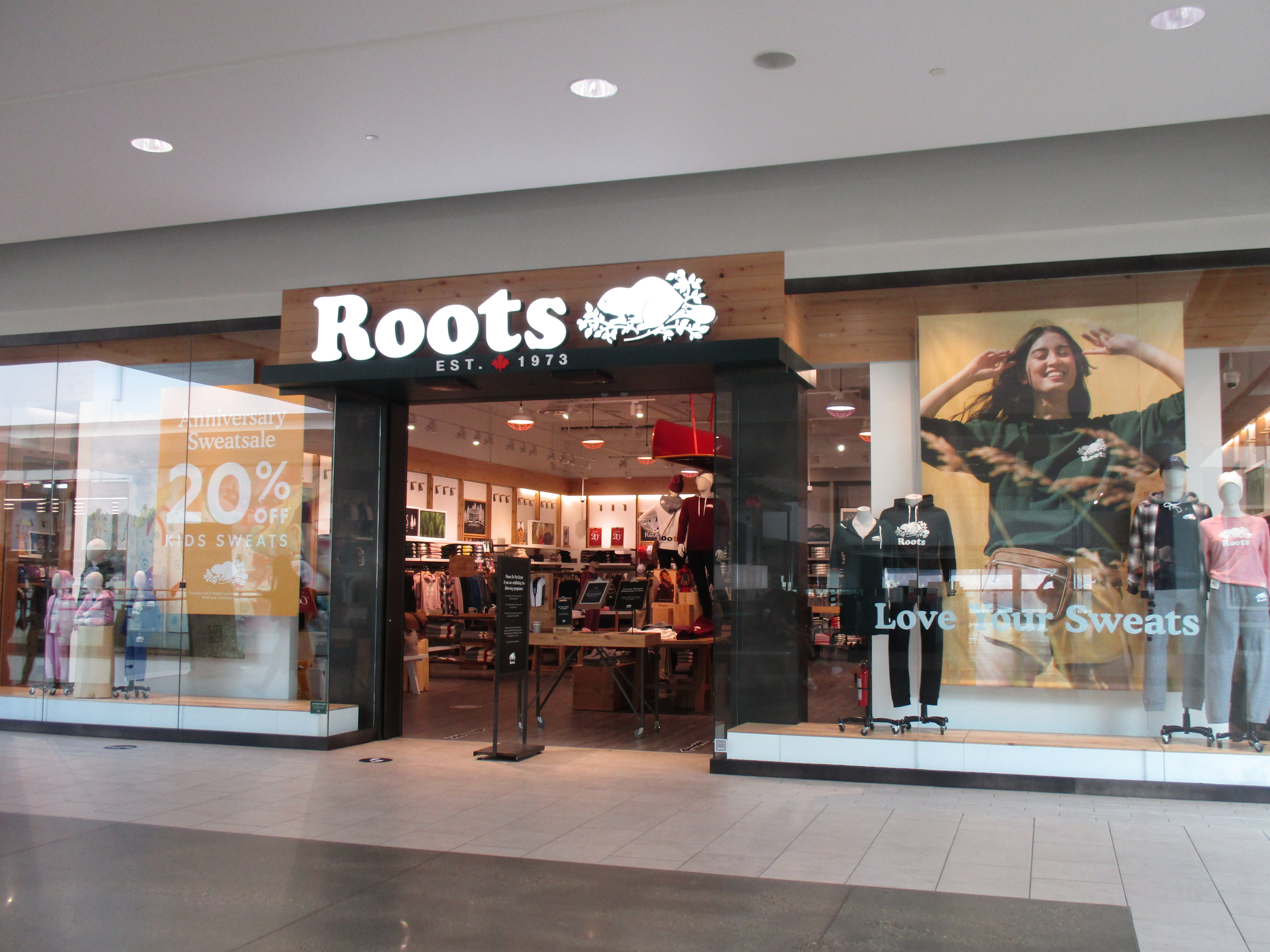
Roots in Edmonton, Alberta, with sweats for sale

In August 2026, Roots entered into an agreement to be acquired by Marquee Brands in a transaction that would take the company private. Under the agreement, shareholders would receive C$4.10 per share in cash, representing a 36% premium.
