= Angna Enters =

American dancer and artist (1897–1989)

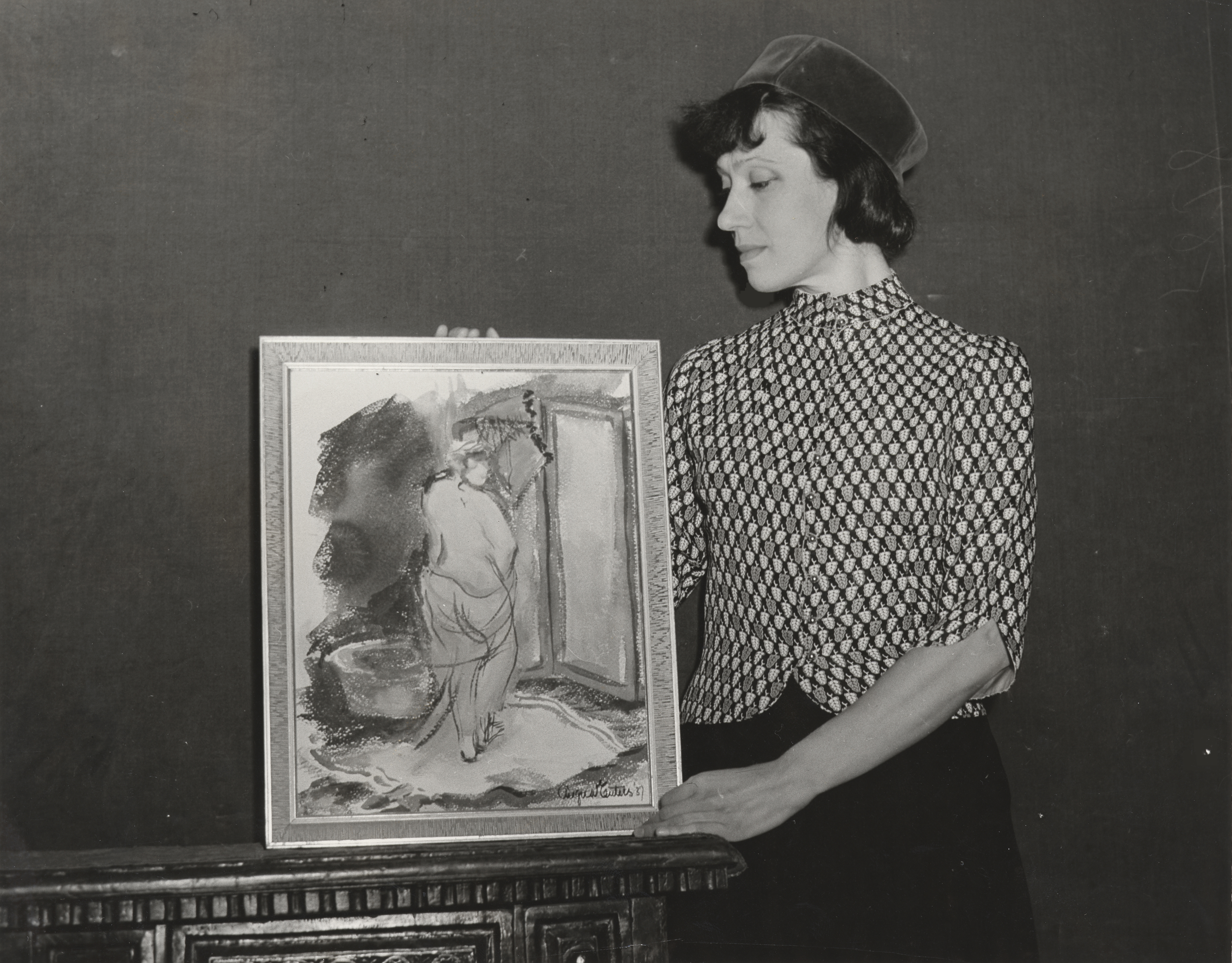
- Enters at the New House Gallery, 1940, New York City
- Born: Anita Engers; April 18, 1897; New York City, United States
- Died: February 25, 1989 (aged 91); Tenafly, New Jersey, United States
- Education: University of Wisconsin–Milwaukee, Art Students League of New York
- Known for: Dance, mime, painting, writing
- Awards: Guggenheim Fellowship

Anita "Angna" Enters (April 18, 1897 – February 25, 1989) was an American dancer, mime, painter, writer, novelist and playwright. She studied at the Art Students League of New York and was a 1934 Guggenheim fellow. She wrote a novel and three autobiographies as well as films Lost Angel (1943) and Tenth Avenue Angel (1948).

== Early life ==
Enters was born in Milwaukee, Wisconsin and graduated from North Division High School in Milwaukee, Wisconsin. She saw the first Denishawn concert tour in 1925, and the following year, an American tour of Sergei Diaghilev's Les Ballets Russes.

== Emergence as a dancer ==
Enters moved to New York to study at the Art Students League of New York in 1920, and began to study dance with Michio Itō the following year, eventually performing as Michio's partner in 1933. That year she created her first piece, an evocation of a statue of a Gothic Virgin, entitled Ecclesiastique. The piece later became Moyen Age. In 1934, she borrowed $25 with which to present her first solo program at the Greenwich Village Theatre. Her solo program, The Theatre of Angna Enters, toured the United States and Europe until 1939 and was performed, though less often, until 1960. In 1934, Enters was awarded a Guggenheim Fellowship to study Hellenistic art forms in Athens, Greece.

== Visual artist ==
Enters created a large body of visual art, including sketches, landscape drawings, archaeological studies, costume plates, water colors and oil portraits. Many of her sketches and paintings were exhibited in the United States and Europe. Her sketches were often costume designs for characters of her mime performances or set designs for plays. The Metropolitan Museum of Art in New York holds selected works by Enters, as do other museums.

== Personal life ==
Enters met journalist Louis Kantor in 1921. The two began dating secretly in 1924, wed quietly in Spain in 1936 but maintained separate households. In 1924, Enters changed her first name to Angna and began using 1907 as her birth year. Kantor also changed his name to Louis Kalonyme in 1924 and began writing art criticism for Arts and Decoration magazine. Kalonyme was friends with many notable thinkers of the day: Eugene O'Neill, George Bernard Shaw, and Georgia O'Keeffe among them. The couple did not have any children and Kalonyme died in 1961 after a long illness.

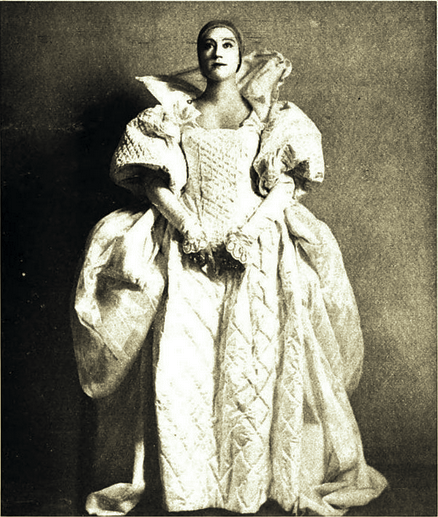
Enters in 1927

In 1924, the realist painter and printmaker John Sloan, along with his fellow artists Robert Henri and George Bellows, attended one of Enters’s shows. They were enchanted. The following year Sloan asked Enters to pose for him in one of her dance routines, “Contre Danse.” Sloan’s etching of this subject was the first of seven etchings that he produced, from 1925 to 1930, showing Enters performing various of her compositions. Although Enters posed for Sloan’s etching of Contre Danse, his six subsequent etchings were done from drawings executed by him while he was attending her shows. These etchings convincingly portray the attitudes of the characters that Enters created, and they convey a vivid sense of what must have made “The Theatre of Angna Enters” so compelling.

== Writing ==
Enters wrote three volumes of autobiography – First Person Plural (1937), Silly Girl (1944) and Artist's Life (1958). She also wrote a novel, Among the Daughters (1956), and a book on her work, On Mime (1966). Her plays, Love Possessed Juana: A Play of the Inquisition in Spain, co-written with Louis Kalonyme, and The Unknown Lover, were presented by the Houston Little Theater in 1946 and 1947. Enters is also credited with having co-written two Hollywood films, Lost Angel (1943) and Tenth Avenue Angel (1948).

== Teaching ==
Enters' first teaching work came at the Stella Adler Studio, where she taught from 1957 to 1960. She was artist-in-residence at the Dallas Theatre Center in 1961 and 1962, and taught mime at Baylor University during that year. She spent the following school year at Wesleyan University in Middletown, Connecticut. In 1970 and 1971 she was artist-in-residence at Pennsylvania State University, during which time she gave her last known public performance.

== Enters' books ==
- First Person Plural. New York: Stackpole Sons, 1937.
- Love Possessed Juana (queen of Castile) a play in four acts. New York: Twice a Year Press, 1939.
- Silly Girl, a Portrait of Personal Remembrance. Cambridge, MA: Houghton Mifflin company, 1944.
- Among the Daughters, a Novel. New York: Coward-McCann, 1955.
- Artist's Life. New York: Coward-McCann, 1958.
- On Mime, second edition. Middletown, CT: Wesleyan University Press, 1968 (first edition 1965).

== Additional reading ==
- Mandel, Dorothy (1986). Uncommon Eloquence: A Biography of Angna Enters. Arden Press. ISBN 0-912869-07-0.
