= Gun Glory =

1957 film by Roy Rowland

- Directed by: Roy Rowland
- Screenplay by: William Ludwig
- Based on: Man of the West; 1955 novel by Philip Yordan
- Produced by: Nicholas Nayfack
- Starring: Stewart Granger; Rhonda Fleming
- Cinematography: Harold J. Marzorati
- Edited by: Frank Santillo
- Music by: Jeff Alexander
- Production company: Metro Goldwyn Mayer
- Distributed by: Metro-Goldwyn-Mayer
- Release date: July 19, 1957 (New York City)
- Running time: 89 minutes
- Country: United States
- Language: English
- Budget: $1,707,000
- Box office: $2,550,000

Gun Glory is a 1957 American Metrocolor Western film directed by Roy Rowland starring Stewart Granger and Rhonda Fleming.

== Plot ==
Tom Early rides into a Wyoming town where he once lived with his wife and son. In the general store, owner Wainscott is annoyed when he believes clerk Jo is flirtatious with Early.

At his old ranch, Early finds his wife's grave and his 17-year-old son, Tom Jr., an immature man embittered by his father's having abandoned him and his mother.

Jo takes a job as housekeeper at Early's ranch. She resists the advances of Tom Jr., whose resentment of his father grows. When they attend church, Wainscott turns the preacher's congregation against them, insinuating Jo is living in sin with Early.

The townspeople need help so they send one of the townspeople to the capital for assistance. When gunmen working for the villainous cattleman Grimsell ambush and kill him, a posse, ineptly led by the preacher, is formed to go after the gunmen. The preacher leads them into an ambush, and half the posse become casualties. By the time Early, who had been told of the posse after they had left, gets to the ambush site the preacher is dying and Tom Jr. is wounded in the leg, their horses gone. Knowing he is mortally wounded, the preacher sends Early away with his son. He takes Tom Jr. home, and he and Jo patch him up. Early then sets out after the gunmen.

Locating the trail in a pass that Early knows the cattle drive must take, he uses dynamite to start a rockslide as Grimsell moves the herd down the trail. The cattle stampede to escape the rockslide and some of Grimsell's men are killed by falling rocks and the cattle.

Grimsell and Gunn, figuring Early was behind the explosion, beat Early back to his ranch. Grimsell tries and fails to intimidate Jo and Tom Jr. while laying in wait. Early tricks Grimsell and Gunn into coming out of the cabin and disarms Grimsell. He then fights with Gunn and beats him. Gunn, lying on the ground, tries to shoot Early in the back but Tom Jr. comes to his rescue, shooting Gunn down. Grimsell rides off, defeated.

Reconciled, Early and Tom Jr. acknowledge their kinship. Jo and Early decide they like each well enough to stay together, raise Tom Jr., improve the ranch, and finish building the church, as Early had promised the dying preacher he would do. They kiss to seal the bargain, their marriage implied.

== Cast ==
- Stewart Granger as Tom Early
- Rhonda Fleming as Jo
- Chill Wills as Preacher
- Steve Rowland as Tom Early, Jr.
- James Gregory as Grimsell
- Jacques Aubuchon as Sam Wainscott
- Arch Johnson as Gunn
- Rayford Barnes as Blonde

== Production ==
The film was based on an original story by Cyril Hume according to one account. Another says it was based on the novel Man of the West by Philip Yordan which Ben Maddow says he wrote under Yordan's name. Maddow also claims to have written the script. Yordan said "But if you read the screenplay, you'll see it fits the hero character that I've always written. I've always written the one character. The hero. A man with a cold, hard, bad past—and I never like to go into the past—with his own set of morals and everything else."

It was one of a series of Westerns MGM started making following the success of The Fastest Gun Alive.

Robert Horton was originally announced as star. Then Stewart Granger was assigned to star. The film was made towards the end of Granger's contract with MGM and he felt they assigned him to this low-budget film to punish him for not renewing with the studio.

He appeared opposite Steve Rowland, the son of the director.

Burl Ives was to play the preacher but had to withdraw and was replaced by Chill Wills. However the music recorded by Ives for the film was retained in the finished production.

== Location ==
The film was shot on locations in Humboldt County, California.

== Reception ==
According to MGM records, the film earned $1,125,000 in the US and Canada and $1,425,000 overseas, making a loss of $265,000.

In France, it recorded admissions of 889,516.

== Comic book adaptation ==
- Dell Four Color #846 (October 1957)

== See also ==
- List of American films of 1957
