= Earth shoe =

Unconventional style of shoe

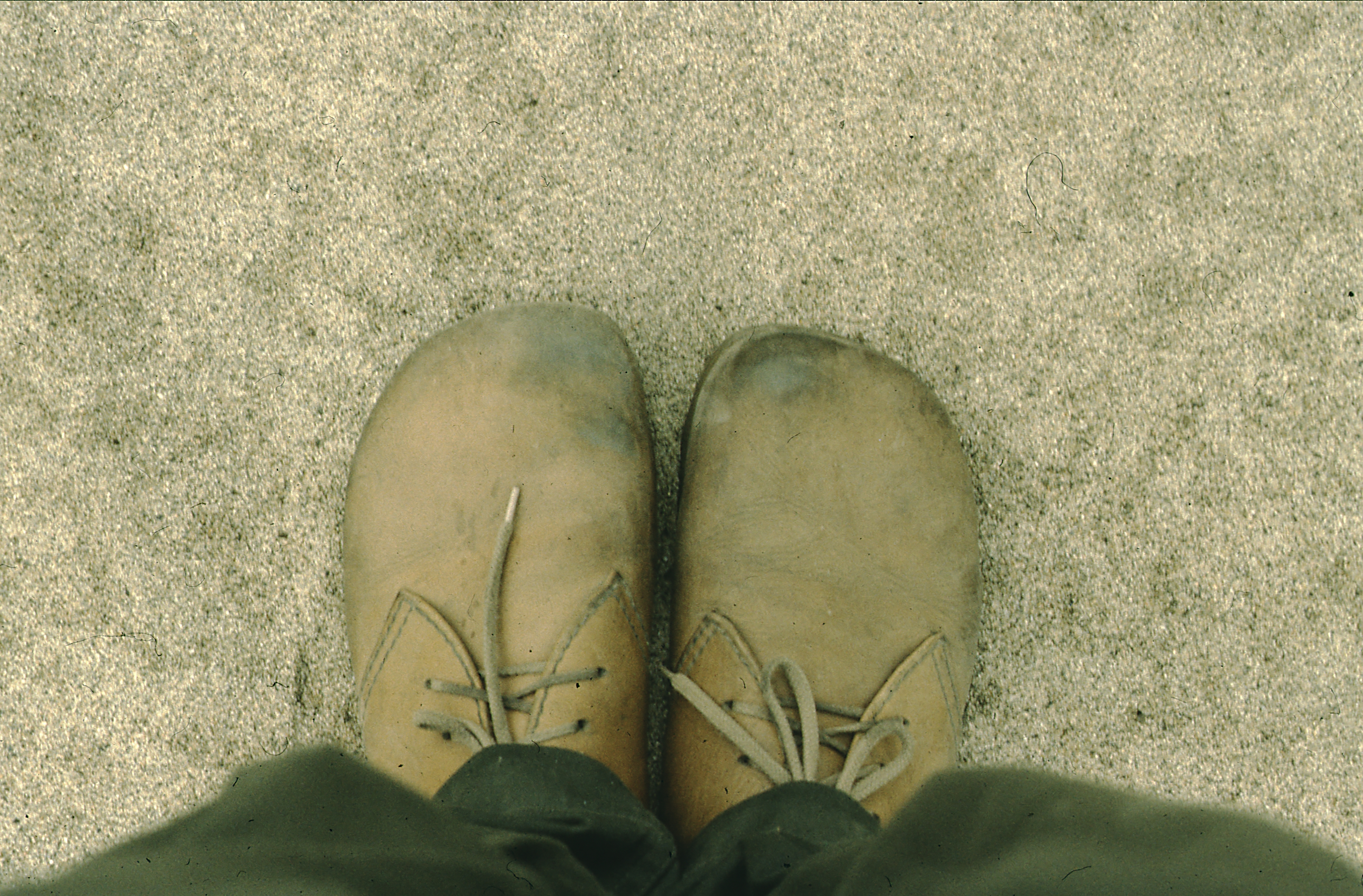
Ecuador Earth shoes at Rio Misahuallí, February 1985

The Earth Shoe (also known as the Kalsø Earth Shoe) was an unconventional style of shoe invented circa 1957 by Danish yoga instructor and shoe designer Anna Kalsø. Its unique "negative heel technology" design featured a sole that was thinner at the heel than at the forefoot, so that when wearing them, one walked heel downward, as when walking in sand, with various claimed health benefits.

== History ==
In 1970, Raymond and Eleanor Jacobs founded the Earth Shoe company in the United States, after discovering Anna Kalsø and her negative-heel shoes in Copenhagen, Denmark. The shoes were introduced in New York City on April 1, 1970, three weeks before the first Earth Day. The shoes quickly became a popular countercultural symbol of the 1970s. The company expanded to 123 stores to sell the shoes, boots, and sandals, all with the negative-heel design, across the United States, Canada, and Europe. The shoes surged in popularity and were prominently featured on The Tonight Show Starring Johnny Carson and in Time magazine. Soon, other firms, including Roots Canada, also marketed similar negative-heel shoes. Experts expressed varying opinions on whether the shoes were good or bad for one's feet.

By 1976 sales had grown to $14 million, but the company dissolved in 1977. When the manufacturer of Kalsø Earth Shoes attempted to broaden their design by introducing many new styles, coupled by over 100 fake Earth shoe looking imitations being introduced by competitors, the original parent company became overextended and embroiled in a lawsuit with Penosbscot Shoe Company (maker of the hand-sewn moccasin Earth Shoe). Subsequently, Kalso Earth Shoe entered Chapter 11 leaving 140 nationwide Earth Shoe store owners without a supplier. In 1977 Tarney Enterprises (Milwaukee, WI) negotiated for and received the exclusive rights to manufacture and distribute the shoes in North America. Earth Shoe store owners John and Richard Tarney began making and distributing the shoes nationwide; and for the first time, Earth Shoes were available to shoe stores other than Earth Shoe stores. Previously, the original, patented Kalsø Earth Shoes were exclusively available only in Earth Shoe Stores. Eventually running into manufacturing difficulties with an east coast subcontractor shoe manufacturer, Tarney Enterprises ceased making the shoes in 1980. In the early-80's, It is told that the entire inventory of Earth Shoes were bought up and were sold through a classified ad in the back of Rolling Stone magazine by David E. Infohe, the husband of The Outsiders author SE Hinton. In 2001, Kalsø Earth Shoes re-surfaced after the rights to the name, technology and branded properties were purchased by Meynard Designs, Inc. Subsequent reorganization of Meynard Designs led to the creation of Earth, Inc., as the manufacturing and marketing entity for Kalsø Earth Shoes. However, the distinguishing characteristic of the original Kalso Earth Shoes, the negative heel, is no longer available. Earth, Inc.'s shoes are not to be confused with the Earth Spirit shoe brand sold by Walmart, and others.

== Media references ==
Night Court S9 E19: P.S. Do I Know You? (March 4, 1992) Roz's penpal "Alex" laments having invested in "Earth Shoes".

== See also ==
- List of shoe styles
