= Flesh and Fury =

1952 film by Joseph Pevney

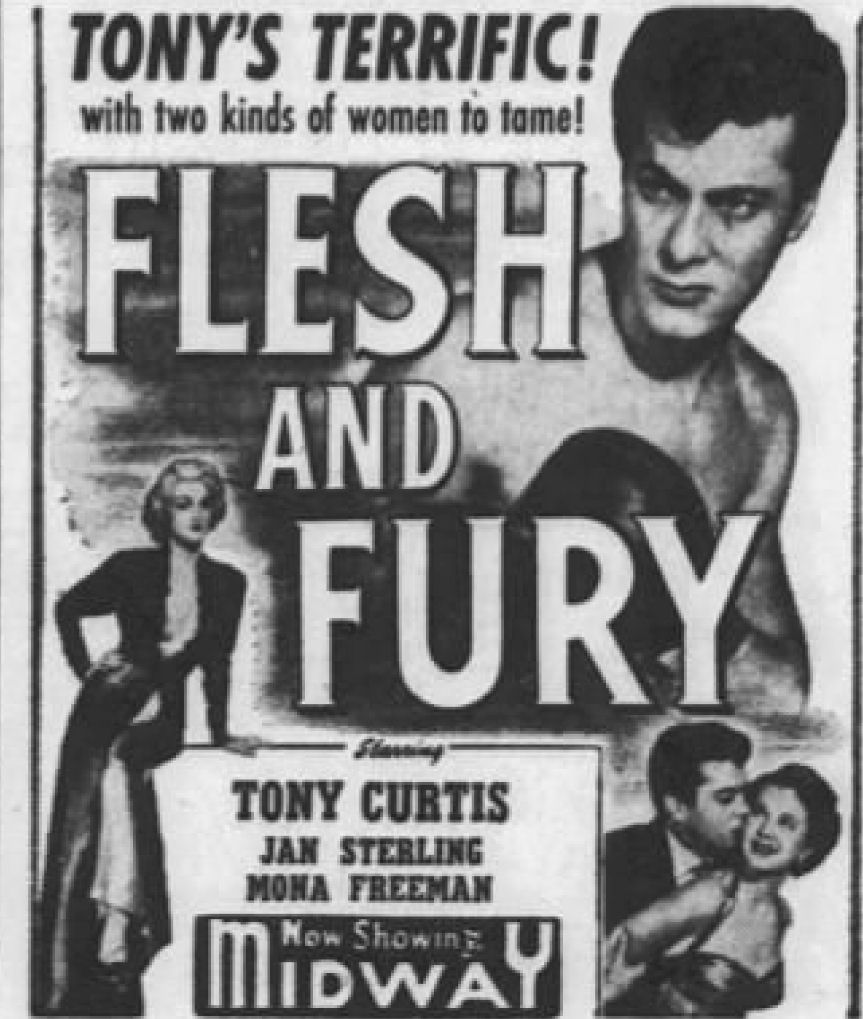
- Newspaper advertisement
- Directed by: Joseph Pevney
- Written by: Bernard Gordon
- Story by: William Alland
- Produced by: Leonard Goldstein
- Starring: Tony Curtis; Jan Sterling; Mona Freeman
- Cinematography: Irving Glassberg
- Edited by: Virgil W. Vogel
- Music by: Hans J. Salter
- Color process: Black and white
- Production company: Universal Pictures
- Distributed by: Universal Pictures
- Release date: March 27, 1952 (New York)
- Running time: 83 minutes
- Country: United States
- Language: English

Flesh and Fury is a 1952 American sports film noir directed by Joseph Pevney and starring Tony Curtis, Jan Sterling and Mona Freeman.

== Plot ==
Boxing fan Sonya Bartow and manager Pop Richardson are impressed when they watch amateur Paul Callan win a fight. They later discover that Paul is deaf.

Pop agrees to train Paul, although Pop is still grieving the loss of a friend who did in the ring. Paul begins a romantic relationship with Sonya, but she refuses to marry him until he becomes a champion. She pressures Pop to arrange a title fight for Paul, although he may not be ready yet.

When reporter Ann Hollis interviews Paul using sign language, Sonya mocks it as a "dummy" language and Paul explains that he has always been reluctant to use it. Ann begins seeing Paul socially, takes him to a school for deaf children and introduces him to her deaf father, a successful architect. Sonya drunkenly threatens to kill Ann if she continues to see Paul.

A doctor performs an operation that restores Paul's hearing. He rushes to Ann's house, but a party there is so noisy that it confuses and overwhelms him. Paul returns to Sonya and learns that a fight has been arranged with Logan, the champ. Paul discovers that Sonya has hidden a telegram from the doctor that warns that a beating in the ring could cause Paul's deafness to return.

Sonya bets heavily on Paul to lose the fight. During the fight, the punches that he receives cause his hearing to fade. However, with all of the distracting noise silenced, Paul rallies to win the fight. He reunites with Ann and is relieved when he can hear her speak.

== Cast ==
- Tony Curtis as Paul Callan
- Jan Sterling as Sonya Bartow
- Mona Freeman as Ann Hollis
- Wallace Ford as Jack 'Pop' Richardson
- Connie Gilchrist as Mrs. Richardson
- Katherine Locke as Mrs. Hollis
- Harry Shannon as Mike Callan
- Louis Jean Heydt as Whity
- Tom Powers as Andy Randolph
- Nella Walker as Mrs. Hackett
- Harry Guardino as Lou Callan
- Joe Gray as Cliff
- Harry Ravan as Murphy
- Ted Stanhope as Maris

== Reception ==
In a contemporary review for The New York Times, critic Howard Thompson wrote: "'Flesh and Fury' remains essentially a standard case history of the ring. The hero's predicament is interesting, to be sure, and the muscular Mr. Curtis conveys his plight, for the most part, with a hesitant perplexity that seems natural enough. But this same quality is apparent in the contrivances of the latter half of the film, which flattens familiarly in a maze of ring clichés."

== See also ==
- List of American films of 1952
- List of boxing films
- List of films featuring the deaf and hard of hearing
