= Tenth Avenue Angel =

1948 film by Roy Rowland

- Directed by: Roy Rowland
- Screenplay by: Harry Ruskin; Eleanore Griffin
- Story by: Angna Enters
- Based on: "Miracle at Midnight" by Craig Rice
- Produced by: Ralph Wheelwright
- Starring: Margaret O'Brien; Angela Lansbury; George Murphy
- Cinematography: Robert L. Surtees
- Edited by: George Boemler; Ralph E. Winters
- Music by: Rudolph G. Kopp
- Distributed by: Metro-Goldwyn-Mayer
- Release date: February 20, 1948
- Running time: 75 minutes
- Country: United States
- Language: English
- Budget: $1,791,000
- Box office: $900,000

Tenth Avenue Angel is a 1948 American drama film directed by Roy Rowland and starring Margaret O'Brien, Angela Lansbury, and George Murphy. It chronicles the life and family of Flavia Mills (Margaret O'Brien) in the late 1930s. Filming took place 11 March–15 May 1946, with retakes in April 1947. However, the film was not released until February 20, 1948.

== Plot ==
Eight-year-old Flavia lives in a New York tenement during the Great Depression with mother Helen and father Joe, who's nearly broke and needs a job. Her aunt Susan lives with them, too. Flavia's thrilled because her aunt's sweetheart, Steve, is returning from a one-year absence. The little girl is unaware that Steve has been in jail for associating with a gangster.

Flavia sees a mouse and is afraid. Her mother tells Flavia a fable that if you catch a mouse and make a wish, it will turn into money. This leads her to hide a mouse in a cigar box in the alley near Mac (the blind newspaper man)'s stand. Two neighborhood youths rob Mac and, by coincidence, hide the money right by the girl's box with the mouse. Flavia finds it and is overjoyed until the adults accuse her of stealing it from Blind Mac. Her mother has to tell her the truth about the fable and Flavia realizes that so many stories she has heard are "lies".

Everybody's desperate for money. Helen's pregnant and faces physical complications. Steve's unable to get his old job, driving a taxi. The gangster offers him a payday for stealing a truck, but Steve's conscience gets the better of him at the last minute. Flavia tries to find the kneeling cow near a railroad before it's too late. Helen is all right, Joe finds a job, and Flavia's thrilled because Susan's going to marry Steve.

== Cast ==
- Margaret O'Brien as Flavia Mills
- Angela Lansbury as Susan Bratten
- George Murphy as Steve Abbott
- Phyllis Thaxter as Helen Mills
- Warner Anderson as Joseph Mills
- Rhys Williams as Blind Mac
- Barry Nelson as Al Parker
- Connie Gilchrist as Mrs. Murphy
- Tom Trout as Daniel Oliver Madison
- Dickie Tyler as Jimmy Madison
- Henry Blair as Rad Ardley
- Charles Cane as Parole Officer
- Richard Lane as Street Vendor

== Reception ==
The film was an expensive failure at the box office, earning only $725,000 in the U.S. and Canada and $75,000 elsewhere, resulting in a loss of $1,227,000.

It has received mixed to negative reviews.
