= The Minx (1969 film) =

- Directed by: Raymond Jacobs
- Written by: Raymond Jacobs; Herbert Jaffey
- Screenplay by: Raymond Jacobs; Herbert Jaffey
- Produced by: Raymond Jacobs; Herbert Jaffey
- Starring: Shirley Parker; Jan Sterling; Robert Rodan
- Production company: Jacobs-Jaffrey Productions
- Distributed by: Cambist Films
- Release date: 1969
- Running time: 84 minutes

The Minx is a 1969 film, directed by Raymond Jacobs, written and produced by Raymond Jacobs and Herbert Jaffey.

== Plot ==
Henry Baxter is married to an aging wife, Louise Baxter, just for her family's company. Henry then attempts a hostile take-over of another company, Imperial Devices, headed by Ben Thayer. Henry hosts a hunting party at a remote lodge. Ben attempts to thwart Henry by deploying a redhead, a blonde, and a brunette, to seduce signatures out of Imperial Device's board members.

== Cast ==
- Jan Sterling as Louise Baxter
- Robert Rodan as Henry Baxter
- Michael Beirne as John Lawson
- Ned Cary as Benjamin Thayer
- Shirley Parker as Terry

== Production ==
The Minx was filmed in 1967, in and near New York City.

The Minx featured an original soundtrack by The Cyrkle.

Herbert Jaffey (29 July 1918 - 30 April 2010) worked for 20th Century Fox and Paramount Pictures in publicity and advertising.

== Release ==
On 21 November 1969, The Minx opened at the Astor Theatre, Broadway and 45th Street, and Loew's Ciné, Third Avenue at 86th Street in New York City.

== Reception ==
Roger Greenspun in The New York Times wrote: "almost all explicit nude sex is performed by extra actors in shots that are interpolated into the film".

== See also ==
- nl:The Minx
