= Margaret O'Brien =

American film, television and stage actress (born 1937)

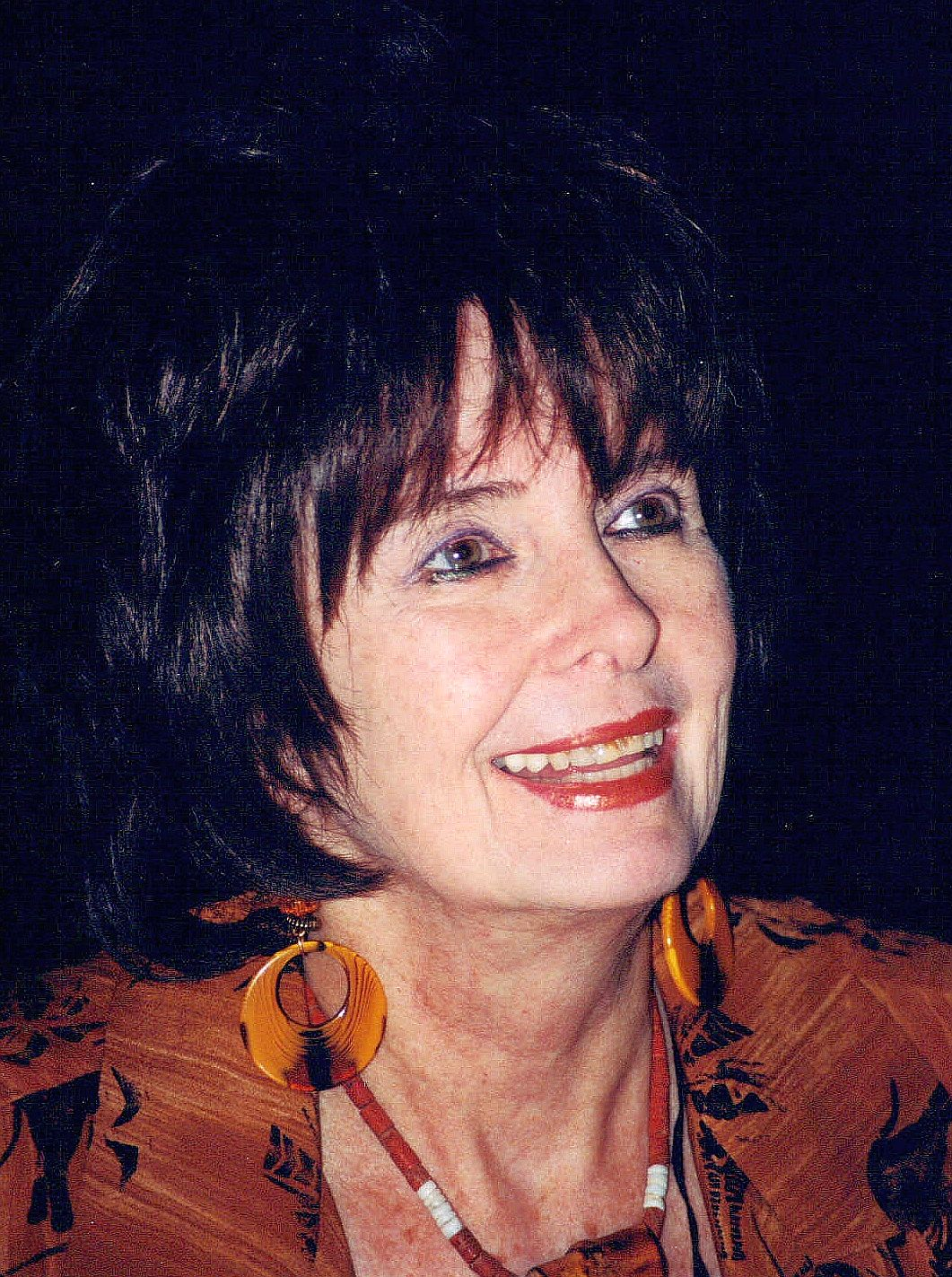
- O'Brien in 2002
- Born: Angela Maxine O'Brien; January 15, 1937 (age 89); San Diego, California, U.S.
- Occupation: Actress
- Years active: 1941–2018
- Known for: Meet Me in St. Louis; The Secret Garden
- Spouses: Harold Allen Jr. (m. 1959; div. 1968) Roy Thorvald Thorsen (m. 1974; died 2018)
- Children: 1 (Roy T. Thorsen)
- Awards: Academy Juvenile Award (1944)

Angela Maxine O'Brien (born January 15, 1937), known professionally as Margaret O'Brien, is a retired American actress. Beginning a career in feature films for Metro-Goldwyn-Mayer at age four, O'Brien became a child star and received a Juvenile Academy Award as the outstanding child actress of 1944 for her role in Meet Me in St. Louis. In her later career, she appeared on television, stage, and in supporting film roles.

O'Brien has two stars on the Hollywood Walk of Fame—one for film, and the other for television.

== Early life and career ==
O'Brien's mother, Gladys Flores (1895–1958), was a flamenco dancer who often performed with her sister Marissa, who was also a dancer. O'Brien is of half-Irish and half-Spanish ancestry. She was raised Catholic.

=== Film ===
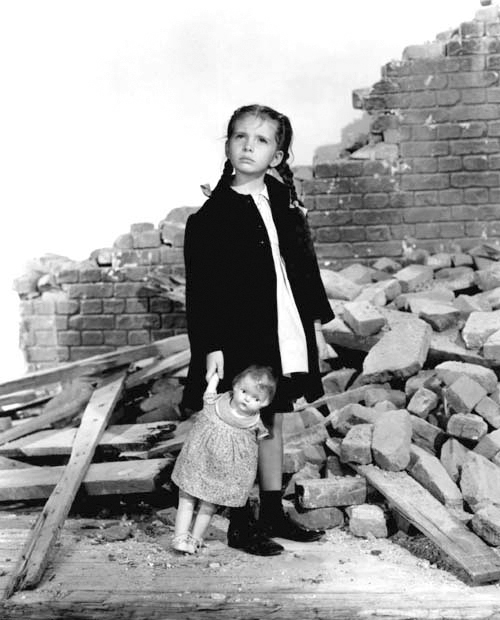
Margaret O'Brien in Journey for Margaret (1942)

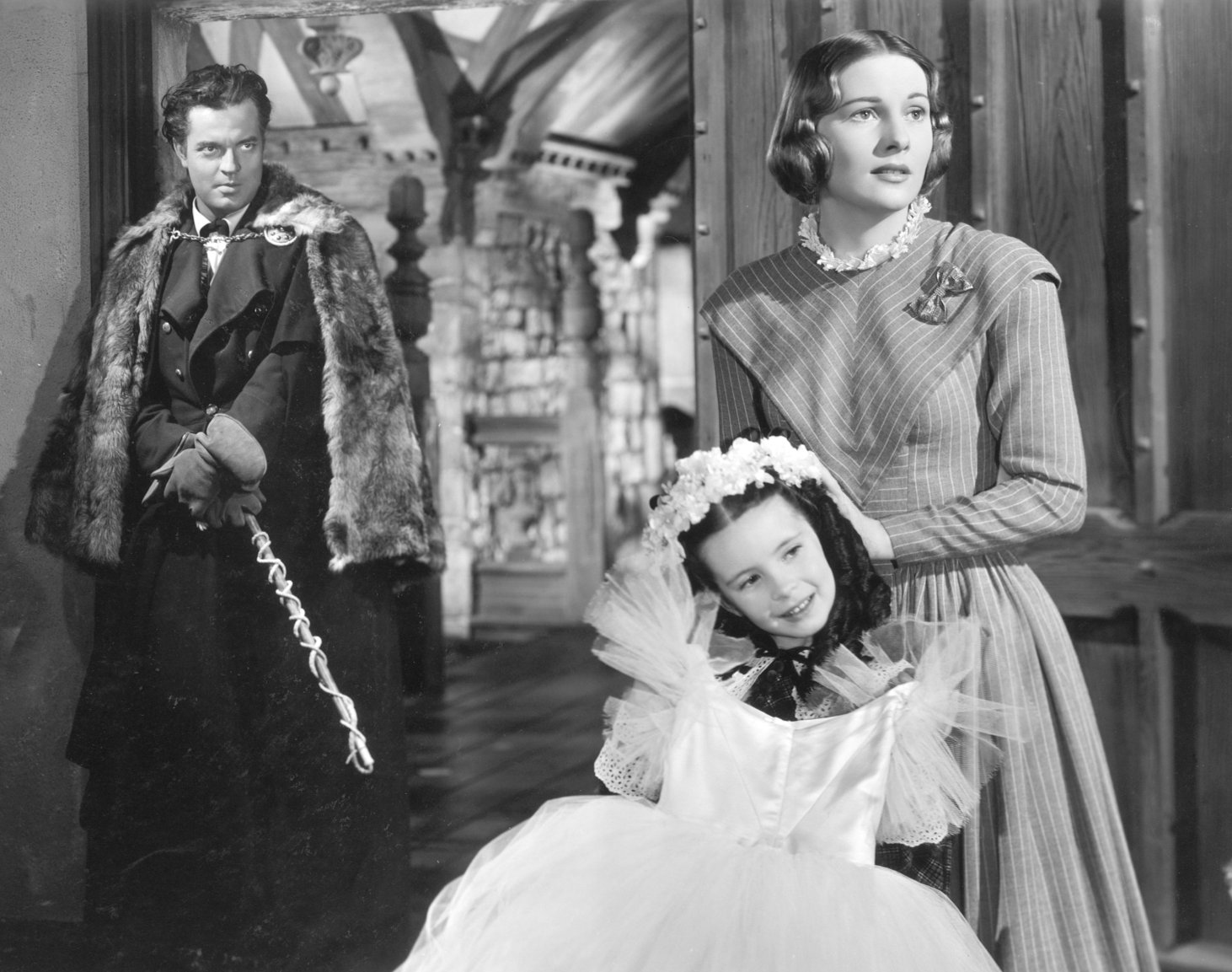
Orson Welles, Margaret O'Brien and Joan Fontaine in Jane Eyre (1943)

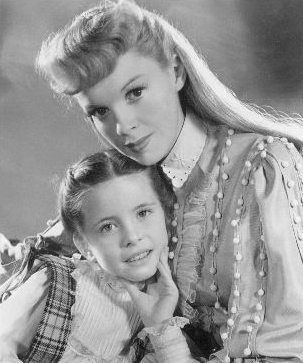
Margaret O'Brien and Judy Garland in Meet Me in St. Louis (1944)

O'Brien made her first film appearance in Metro-Goldwyn-Mayer's Babes on Broadway (1941) at the age of four, but it was the following year that her first major role brought her widespread attention. As a five-year-old in Journey for Margaret (1942), O'Brien won wide praise for her quite convincing acting style, unusual for a child of her age. By 1943, she was considered a big enough star to have a cameo appearance in the all-star military show finale of Thousands Cheer. Also in 1943, at the age of seven, Margaret co-starred in You, John Jones!, an MGM short film for the War Activities Committee of the Motion Pictures Industry, with James Cagney and Ann Sothern (playing her parents), in which she dramatically recited President Lincoln's "Gettysburg Address". She played Adèle, a young French girl, and spoke and sang all her dialogue with a French accent in Jane Eyre (1943).

Arguably her most memorable role was in Meet Me in St. Louis (1944), opposite Judy Garland. For her performance in this film as the younger sister "Tootie", she was awarded a special juvenile Oscar at the 17th Academy Awards in 1944.

Margaret and June Allyson were known as "The Town Criers" of MGM. "We were always in competition: I wanted to cry better than June, and June wanted to cry better than me. The way my mother got me to cry was if I was having trouble with a scene, she'd say, 'why don't we have the make-up man come over and give you false tears?' Then I'd think to myself, 'they'll say I'm not as good as June,' and I'd start to cry."

O'Brien‘s other successes included The Canterville Ghost (1944), Our Vines Have Tender Grapes (1945), Bad Bascomb (1946) with Wallace Beery, and the first sound version of The Secret Garden (1949). She played Beth in the 1949 MGM release of Little Women, but she was unable to make the transition to adult roles.

O'Brien later shed her child star image, appearing on a 1958 cover of Life magazine with the caption "How the Girl's Grown", and was a mystery guest on the TV panel show What's My Line? O'Brien's acting appearances as an adult have been sporadic, mostly in small independent films and occasional television roles. She has also given interviews, mostly for the Turner Classic Movies cable network.

=== Television ===
O'Brien gave credit to television for helping her reform and modify her public image. In an interview in 1957, when she was 20, she said: "The wonderful thing about TV is that it has given me a chance to get out of the awkward age — something the movies couldn't do for me. No movie producer could really afford to take a chance at handing me an adult role."

On November 20, 1950, O'Brien co-starred with Cecil Parker in "The Canterville Ghost", on Robert Montgomery Presents on TV. She appeared as the mystery guest on What's My Line? in 1957. On December 22, 1957, O'Brien starred in "The Young Years" on General Electric Theater. She played the role of Betsy Stauffer, a small-town nurse, in "The Incident of the Town in Terror" on television's Rawhide. She appeared in "The Sacramento Story" on Wagon Train in 1958, playing Julie Revere, courted by Robert Horton's Flint McCullough. She made a guest appearance on a 1963 episode of Perry Mason as Virginia Trent in "The Case of the Shoplifter's Shoe". In 1967, she made a guest appearance on the World War II TV drama Combat!. Also, in a 1968 two-part episode of Ironside ("Split Second to an Epitaph"), O'Brien played a pharmacist who (quite the opposite of her usual screen persona) was involved in drug theft and was accessory to attempted murder of star Raymond Burr's Ironside. Another rare television outing was as a guest star on the popular Marcus Welby, M.D. in the early 1970s, reuniting O'Brien with her Journey for Margaret and The Canterville Ghost co-star Robert Young.

In 1991, O'Brien appeared in Murder, She Wrote, season 7, episode "Who Killed J.B. Fletcher?", reuniting O'Brien with her Tenth Avenue Angel co-star Angela Lansbury.

== Academy Award ==
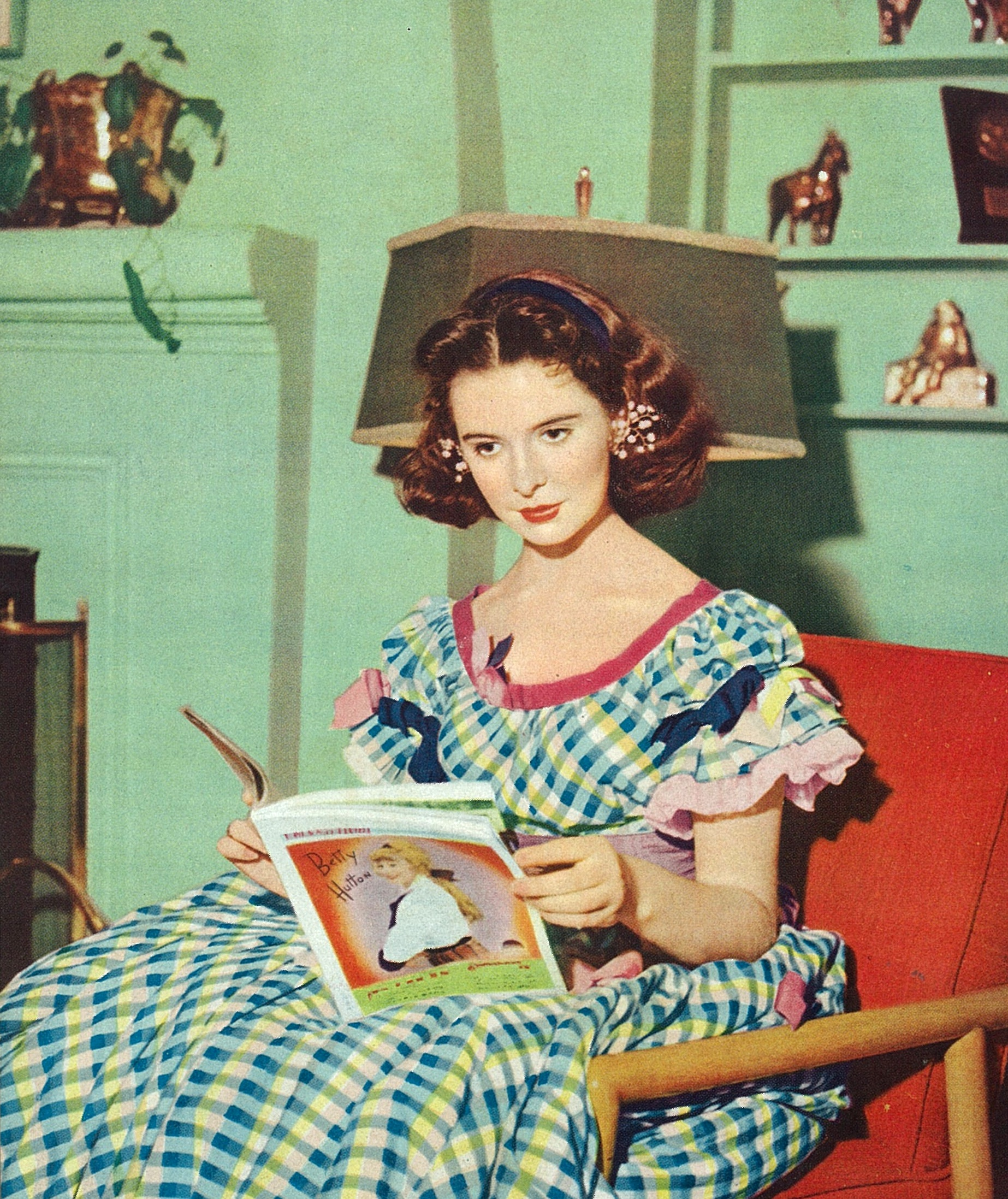
O'Brien in Eiga no Tomo ("Film Friend" magazine; November 1952)

While O'Brien was growing up, her awards were always kept in a special room. One day in 1954, the family's maid asked to take O'Brien's Juvenile Oscar and two other awards home with her to polish, as she had done in the past. After three days, the maid failed to return to work, prompting O'Brien's mother to discharge her, requesting that the awards be returned. Not long after, O'Brien's mother, who had been sick with a heart condition, suffered a relapse and died. In mourning, 17-year-old O'Brien forgot about the maid and the Oscar until several months later when she tried to contact her, only to find that the maid had moved and had left no forwarding address.

Several years later, upon learning that the original had been stolen, the Academy promptly supplied O'Brien with a replacement Oscar, but O'Brien still held on to hope that she might one day recover her original Award. In the years that followed, O'Brien attended memorabilia shows and searched antique shops, hoping she might find the original statuette, until one day in 1995 when Bruce Davis, then executive director of the Academy, was alerted that a miniature statuette bearing O'Brien's name had surfaced in a catalogue for an upcoming memorabilia auction. Davis contacted a mutual friend of his and O'Brien's, who in turn phoned O'Brien to tell her the long-lost Oscar had been found.

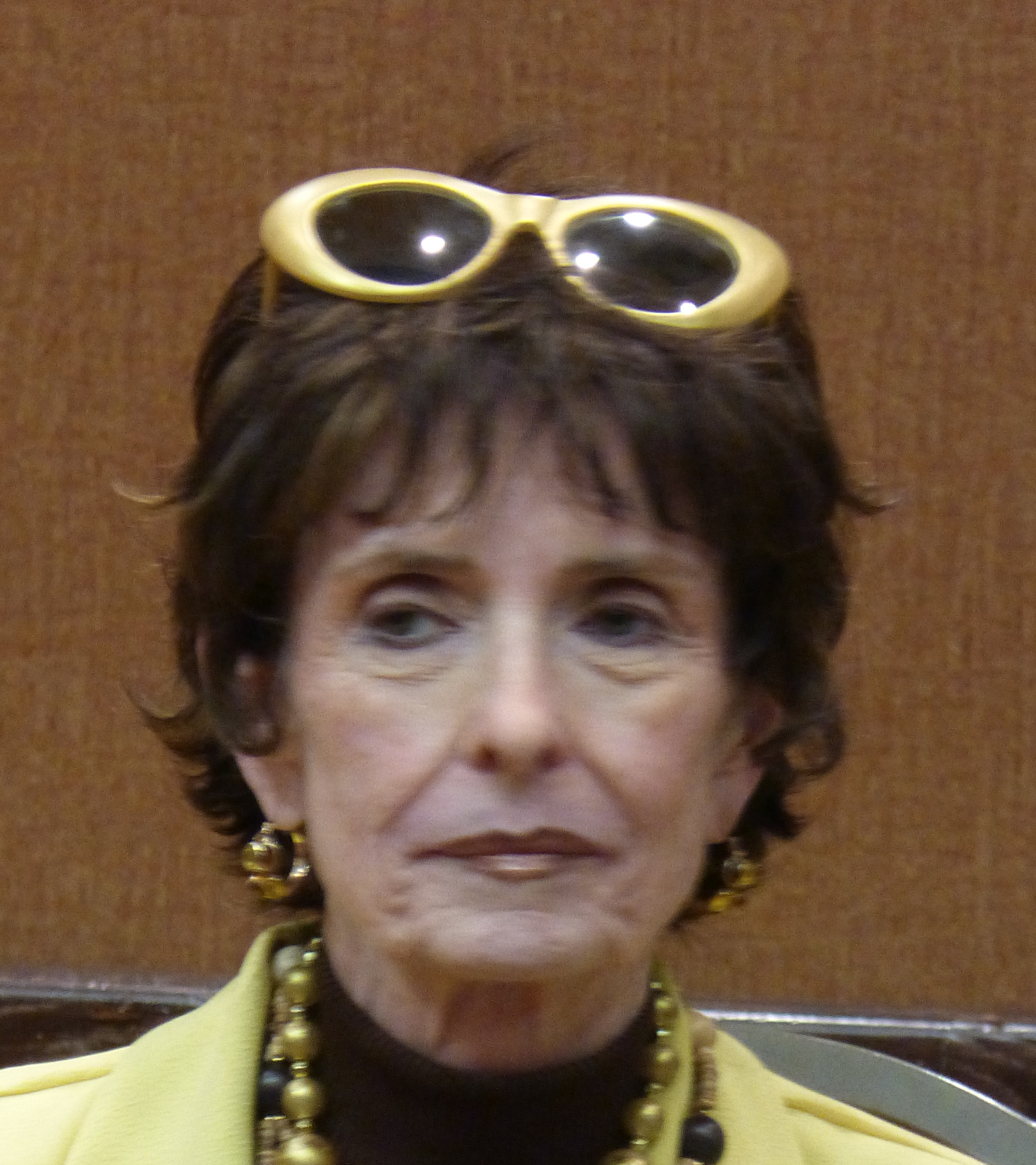
O'Brien in 2013

Memorabilia collectors Steve Neimand and Mark Nash were attending a flea market in 1995 when Neimand spotted a small Oscar with Margaret O'Brien's name inscribed upon it. The two men decided to split the $500 asking price hoping to resell it at a profit and lent it to a photographer to shoot for an upcoming auction catalogue. This led to Bruce Davis' discovery that the statuette had resurfaced and, upon learning of the award's history, Nash and Neimand agreed to return the Oscar to O'Brien. On February 7, 1995, nearly 50 years after she had first received it, and nearly 40 years since it had been stolen, the Academy held a special ceremony in Beverly Hills to return the stolen award to O'Brien. Upon being reunited with her Juvenile Oscar, Margaret O'Brien spoke to the attending journalists:

For all those people who have lost or misplaced something that was dear to them, as I have, never give up the dream of searching—never let go of the hope that you'll find it because after all these many years, at last, my Oscar has been returned to me.

== Additional honors ==
In February 1960, O'Brien was honored with two stars on the Hollywood Walk of Fame, one for motion pictures at 6606 Hollywood Boulevard, and one for television at 1634 Vine St. In 1990, O'Brien was honored by the Young Artist Foundation with its Former Child Star "Lifetime Achievement" Award recognizing her outstanding achievements within the film industry as a child actress. In 2006, she was presented with a Lifetime Achievement Award by the SunDeis Film Festival at Brandeis University.

== Personal life ==
O'Brien was married to Harold Allen Jr. from August 9, 1959 until their divorce in 1968. She was married to steel-industry executive Roy Thorvald Thorsen from June 6, 1974 until his death in 2018. Their daughter, Mara Tolene Thorsen, was born in 1977.

== Filmography ==
=== Film ===
Year	Film	Role	Notes
1941	Babes on Broadway	Maxine, Little Girl at Audition	Uncredited
1942	Journey for Margaret	Margaret White	
1943	You, John Jones!	Their daughter	Short film
1943	Dr. Gillespie's Criminal Case	Margaret	
1943	Thousands Cheer	Customer in Red Skelton Skit	
1943	Madame Curie	Irene Curie (at age 5)	
1943	Lost Angel	Alpha	
1944	Jane Eyre	Adèle Varens	
1944	The Canterville Ghost	Lady Jessica de Canterville	
1944	Meet Me in St. Louis	'Tootie' Smith	Academy Juvenile Award
1944	Music for Millions	Mike	
1945	Our Vines Have Tender Grapes	Selma Jacobson	
1946	Bad Bascomb	Emmy	
1946	Three Wise Fools	Sheila O'Monahan	
1947	The Unfinished Dance	'Meg' Merlin	
1948	Big City	Midge	
1948	Tenth Avenue Angel	Flavia Mills	
1949	Little Women	Beth March	
1949	The Secret Garden	Mary Lennox	
1951	Her First Romance	Betty Foster	
1952	Futari no hitomi	Katherine McDermott	U.S. title: Girls Hand in Hand
1956	Glory	Clarabel Tilbee	
1960	Heller in Pink Tights	Della Southby	
1965	Agente S 3 S operazione Uranio		
1974	Annabelle Lee		
1974	Diabolique Wedding		AKA Diabolic Wedding
1974	That's Entertainment!	Herself and archive footage	
1981	Amy	Hazel Johnson	AKA Amy on the Lips
1996	Sunset After Dark	Betty Corman	
1998	Creaturealm: From the Dead	Herself	Segment: Hollywood Mortuary
2000	Child Stars: Their Story	Herself	AKA Child Stars
2002	Dead Season	Friendly Looking Lady	
2004	The Mystery of Natalie Wood	Herself	
2005	Boxes	Herself	Short film
2006	Store	Herself	
2009	Dead in Love	Cris	
2010	Frankenstein Rising		
2010	Elf Sparkle and the Special Red Dress	Mrs. Claus (voice)	
2017	Dr. Jekyll and Mr. Hyde	Ms. Stevenson	
2017	Halloween Pussy Trap Kill! Kill!	Bridgette's Grandmother	
2018	Prepper's Grove	Gigi	
2018	This Is Our Christmas	Mrs. Foxworth	
2018	Impact Event	Amanda	

=== Television ===
Year	Title	Role	Notes
1950	Robert Montgomery Presents	Ginny	Episode:"The Canterville Ghost"
1951-1954	Lux Video Theatre	Elaine/Laura/Margaret	3 episodes
1957	What's My Line?	Mystery Guest	
1958	Little Women	Beth March	TV Movie
1958	Wagon Train	Julie Revere	Episode:"The Sacramento Story"
1960	New Comedy Showcase	Maggie Bradley	Episode:"Maggie"
1962	Dr. Kildare	Nurse Lori Palmer	Episode:"The Dragon"
1963	Perry Mason	Virginia Trent	Episode:"The Case of the Shoplifter's Shoe"
1964	Bob Hope Presents the Chrysler Theatre	Anne Lipscott	Episode:"The Turncoat"
1967	Combat!	Marianne Fraisnet	Episode:"Entombed"
1968	Ironside	Louise Prescott	2 episodes
1969	Love, American Style	Miss Walker	Episode:"Love Letter"
1970	Adam-12	Mrs. Pendleton	Episode: "Log 85: Sign of the Twins"
1972	Marcus Welby, M.D.	Neva Phillips	Episode: "Dinner of Herbs"
1974	Death in Space	Mrs. Pam Rhodes	TV Movie
1977	Testimony of Two Men	Flora Eaton	
1983	Hotel	Martha Conelly	Episode: "The Offer"
1986	Tales from the Darkside	Mildred	Episode: "Black Widows"
1991	Murder, She Wrote	Florence	Episode: "Who Killed J.B. Fletcher?"
1991	The New Lassie	Elizabeth Helms	Episode: "No Pets Allowed"
2009–2011	Project Lodestar Sagas	Livia Wells	

== Selected radio credits ==
Year	Program	Episode	Airdate	Writer (original story)	Character Role	Notes	mp3
1943	The Screen Guild Theater	"Journey for Margaret"	5 April 1943	William Lindsay White	Margaret Davis (girl)	The Lady Esther Presents The Screen Guild Players. Related movie: Journey for Margaret.	mp3
1947	Philco Radio Time (with Bing Crosby)		28 May 1947		self (as guest)		mp3
1948	Lux Radio Theatre	"Bad Bascomb"	1 March 1948		Emmy (girl)	Western radio drama involving a Mormon emigrant wagon train. Related movie: Bad Bascomb.	mp3
1948	Philco Radio Time (with Bing Crosby)	"St. Patrick's Day Program"	17 March 1948		self (as guest)	Saint Patrick's Day special.	mp3
1948	Suspense	"The Screaming Woman"	25 November 1948	Ray Bradbury	Margaret Leary (girl)	Thanksgiving themed radio drama. Agnes Moorehead as the screaming woman. Considered one of the best episodes of Suspense and old-time radio overall.	mp3
1949	The MGM Theater of the Air	"The Youngest Profession"	25 November 1949	Ira Marion (adaption to radio)	Joan Lyons	Classical tale of the teenagers, the autograph hounds, who also get their names.	
1950	Lux Radio Theatre	"Little Women"	13 March 1950		Beth March	The familiar story about four sisters growing up during the Civil War.	
1950	The Big Show (NBC Radio)		31 December 1950		self (as guest)	Performs scene from Romeo and Juliet with Jose Ferrer	

== Accolades ==
Year	Award	Honor	Result	Ref.
1945	Academy Award	Juvenile Award for Outstanding Child Actress of 1944	Honored	
1960	Hollywood Walk of Fame	Star of Motion Pictures – 6606 Hollywood Blvd.	Inducted	
1960	Hollywood Walk of Fame	Star of Television – 1634 Vine Street.	Inducted	
1990	Young Artist Award	Former Child Star Lifetime Achievement Award	Honored	

=== Box office ranking ===
For a time O'Brien was voted by exhibitors as among the most popular stars in the country.

- 1945: 9th
- 1946: 8th
- 1947: 19th

== Bibliography ==
- Best, Marc. Those Endearing Young Charms: Child Performers of the Screen (South Brunswick and New York: Barnes & Co., 1971), p. 203–208.
- Dye, David. Child and Youth Actors: Filmography of Their Entire Careers, 1914–1985. Jefferson, NC: McFarland & Co., 1988, pp. 170–171.
