= Jan Sterling =

American actress (1921–2004)

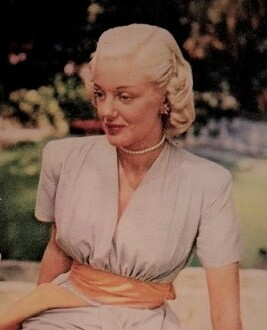
- Sterling in 1952
- Born: Jane Sterling Adriance; April 3, 1921; New York City, U.S.
- Died: March 26, 2004 (aged 82); Los Angeles, California, U.S.
- Occupation: Actress
- Years active: 1938–1988
- Known for: The High and the Mighty; Ace in the Hole; Johnny Belinda
- Spouses: John Merivale (m. 1941; div. 1948) Paul Douglas (m. 1950; died 1959)
- Children: 2

Jan Sterling (born Jane Sterling Adriance; April 3, 1921 – March 26, 2004) was an American film, television and stage actress. At her most active in films during the 1950s (immediately prior to which she had joined the Actors Studio), Sterling received a Golden Globe Award for Best Supporting Actress for her performance in The High and the Mighty (1954) as well as an Academy Award for Best Supporting Actress nomination. Her best performance is often considered to be opposite Kirk Douglas, as the opportunistic wife in Billy Wilder's 1951 Ace in the Hole. Although her career declined during the 1960s, she continued to play occasional television and theatre roles.

== Early life ==
Sterling was born in New York City, the daughter of Eleanor Ward (née Deans) and William Allen Adriance Jr, an architect and advertising executive. She had a younger sister, Ann "Mimi" Adriance, a model and businesswoman. Jane grew up in a wealthy household and attended private schools before moving with her family to Europe and South America. In London and Paris she was schooled by private tutors, and in London she attended Fay Compton's dramatic school. During the taping of the pilot of a game show in 1968, she told the story of having been sent airfare to fly back to the United States; seeing some lingerie she liked in a shop window, she used the last of her money to buy it, then traded in the airfare and booked aboard a steamship. Midway through the voyage, she found out that the airship she had originally been booked on, the Hindenburg, had been destroyed in a massive fire upon arriving in New Jersey on May 6, 1937.

== Acting career ==
As a teenager, she returned to the borough of Manhattan, and using variations of her given name, including "Jane Adriance" and "Jane Sterling", she began her acting career in 1938 by performing on Broadway as the character Chris Faringdon in Bachelor Born. For the summer of 1939, Sterling appeared in the summer stock cast at Elitch Theatre, the oldest Summer stock theater in the country, with Jane Wyatt appearing as the season's leading lady.

She then appeared in a variety of other Broadway productions during the 1940s, such as When We Were Married, This Rock, and The Rugged Path. In 1947, she made her film debut in Tycoon, billed as Jane Darian. Ruth Gordon reportedly insisted she change her stage name, and they agreed upon Jan Sterling. She played a prominent supporting role in Johnny Belinda (1948). Alternating between films and television, Sterling appeared in several television anthology series during the 1950s, and played film roles in Caged (1950), Mystery Street (1950), Union Station (1950), The Mating Season (1951), Ace in the Hole (1951), Flesh and Fury (1952), Pony Express (1953), The High and the Mighty (1954), Female on the Beach (1955), and High School Confidential (1958).

Sterling was often cast as hard and determined characters, as in both her Wagon Train roles. She played a sympathetic character in Sky Full of Moon (1952). In 1950, she was cast as Ruth (the girlfriend of Deputy Roscoe, played by veteran western film star Roscoe Ates) on The Marshal of Gunsight Pass.

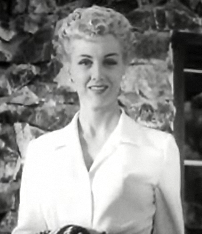
Sterling in Split Second (1953)

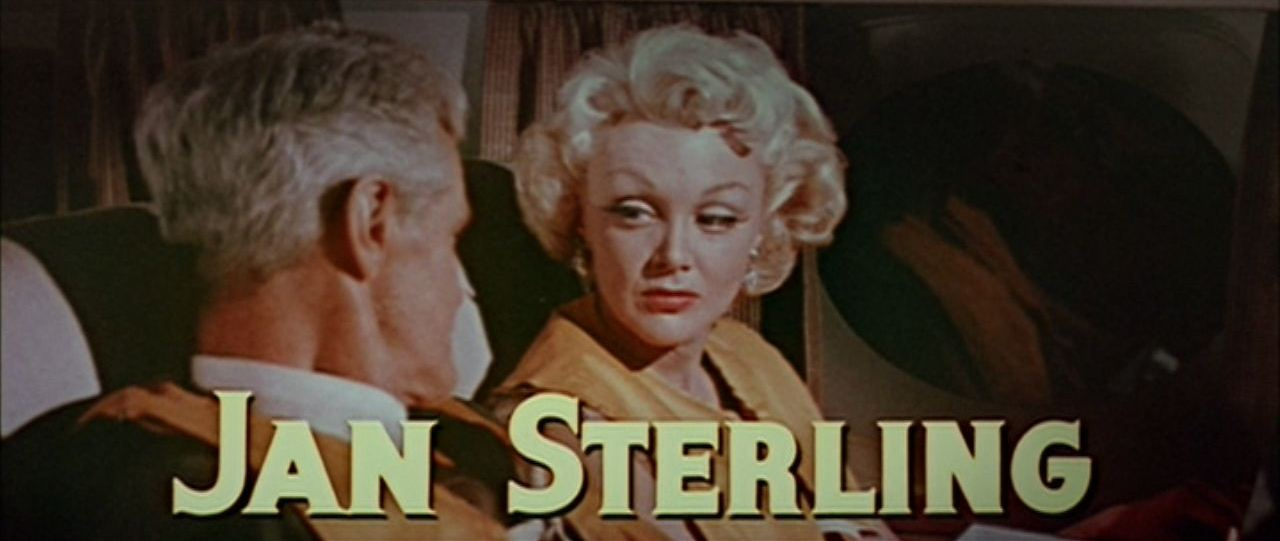
Sterling in The High and the Mighty (1954)

In 1954, Sterling was nominated for an Academy Award and won a Golden Globe Award for Best Supporting Actress for her performance in The High and the Mighty. Later that year, she travelled to Britain to play the role of Julia in the 1956 version of George Orwell's 1984 despite being several months pregnant at the time. During the following years, she appeared regularly in films. Some of her appearances on American television series include the title character in "The Annie Griffith Story" on Wagon Train in 1959 and "The Selena Hartnell Story" in 1961; and during the 1960s, guest-starring role on Riverboat, her performance as Dianne Jordan in a 1960 Bonanza episode ("The Blood Line"), her portrayal of Nurse Murdoch in the 1963 episode "Millions of Faces" on ABC's Breaking Point, and her performance in the 1967 episode "Eleven Miles to Eden" of NBC's The Road West. In late 1968, Sterling began portraying the conniving Miss Foss on The Guiding Light. After performing in the 1969 film The Minx, she curtailed her appearances in films and on television but continued to work on stage. She did, however, return to television in 1979 to portray the wife of President Herbert Hoover in Backstairs at the White House, and in 1981, Sterling made her last film appearance playing Walter Matthau's wife in the First Monday in October.

== Marriages ==
Sterling was married twice. In 1941 she wed actor John Merivale, a union that ended in divorce seven years later. She then married actor Paul Douglas in 1950 and remained with him until his death in 1959. In the 1970s, she entered into a long-lasting personal relationship with Sam Wanamaker, who was based predominantly in the United Kingdom. Inactive professionally for nearly two decades, she made an appearance at the Cinecon Film Festival in Los Angeles in 2001.

== Health and death ==
Sterling's later life was marked by illness and injury that included diabetes, a broken hip, and a series of strokes. Her son died of heart failure in December 2003 aged 48. Sterling died three months later, on March 26, 2004, aged 82, at the Motion Picture and Television Hospital in Woodland Hills, California.

== Films ==
- Tycoon (1947) – Dancer at Fiesta (uncredited)
- Johnny Belinda (1948) – Stella McCormick
- Caged (1950) – Jeta Kovsky – aka Smoochie
- The Skipper Surprised His Wife (1950) – Rita Rossini
- Mystery Street (1950) – Vivian Heldon
- Gunfire (1950) – Flo – Saloon Girl (uncredited)
- Union Station (1950) – Marge Wrighter
- Snow Dog (1950)
- The Mating Season (1951) – Betsy
- Appointment with Danger (1951) – Dodie
- Ace in the Hole (1951) – Lorraine Minosa
- Rhubarb (1951) – Polly Sickles
- Flesh and Fury (1952) – Sonya Bartow
- Sky Full of Moon (1952) – Dixie Delmar
- Pony Express (1953) – Denny Russell
- Split Second (1953) – Dottie Vale
- The Vanquished (1953) – Rose Slater
- Alaska Seas (1954) – Nicky Jackson
- The High and the Mighty (1954) – Sally McKee
- Return from the Sea (1954) – Frieda
- The Human Jungle (1954) – Mary Abbott
- Women's Prison (1955) – Brenda Martin
- Female on the Beach (1955) – Amy Rawlinson
- Man with the Gun (1955) – Nelly Bain
- 1984 (1956) – Julia of the Outer Party
- The Harder They Fall (1956) – Beth Willis
- Slaughter on Tenth Avenue (1957) – Madge Pitts
- The Female Animal (1958) – Lily Frayne
- High School Confidential! (1958) – Arlene Williams
- Kathy O' (1958) – Celeste Saunders
- Love in a Goldfish Bowl (1961) – Sandra Slide
- The Incident (1967) – Muriel Purvis
- The Angry Breed (1968) – Gloria Patton
- The Minx (1969) – Louise Baxter
- Sammy Somebody (1971)
- First Monday in October (1981) – Christine Snow

== Selected television appearances ==
- Alfred Hitchcock Presents (1958) (Season 3, Episode 20: "On the Nose") – Fran Holland
- Wagon Train (1959) (Season 2, Episode 21: "The Annie Griffith Story") – Annie Griffith
- Wagon Train (1961) (Season 5, Episode 4: "The Selena Hartnell Story") – Selena Hartnell
- Alfred Hitchcock Presents (1961) (Season 6, Episode 17: "The Last Escape") – Wanda Ferlini
- The Alfred Hitchcock Hour (1962) (Season 1, Episode 14: "The Tender Poisoner") – Beatrice Bartel

== Radio appearances ==
| Year | Program | Episode/source |
|---|---|---|
| 1952 | Stars over Hollywood | A Dime a Dozen |
| 1953 | Theatre Guild on the Air | The Show-Off |
