= Marsha Hunt filmography =

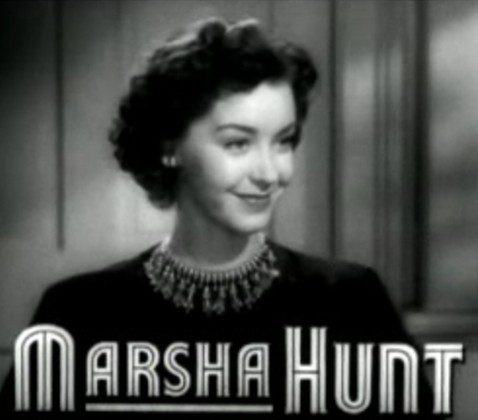
Hunt in Cry 'Havoc' trailer, 1943

Marsha Hunt (born Marcia Virginia Hunt; October 17, 1917 – September 7, 2022) was an American actress, model and activist. She was blacklisted by Hollywood film studio executives in the 1950s during the McCarthyism.

During her career spanning some almost 80 years, starting from 1935 until 2014, she appeared in around 70 films, popular titles include: Born to the West (1937), Pride and Prejudice (1940), Kid Glove Killer (1942), Cry 'Havoc' (1943), Raw Deal (1948), The Happy Time (1952), and Johnny Got His Gun (1971).

== Filmography ==
Year	Title	Role	Notes
1935	The Virginia Judge	Mary Lee Calvert	
1936	The Arizona Raiders	Harriett Lindsay	
1936	The Accusing Finger	Claire Patterson	
1936	College Holiday	Sylvia Smith	
1936	Easy to Take	Donna Westlake	
1936	Gentle Julia	Julia Atwater	
1936	Desert Gold	Judith Belding	
1936	Hollywood Boulevard	Patricia Blakeford	
1937	Annapolis Salute	Julia Clemens	
1937	Born to the West	Judy Worstall	
1937	Thunder Trail	Amy Morgan	
1937	Murder Goes to College	Nora Barry	
1937	Easy Living	Girl	
1938	Come On, Leathernecks!	Valerie Taylor	
1939	These Glamour Girls	Betty Ainsbridge	
1939	Star Reporter	Barbara Burnette	
1939	Winter Carnival	Lucy Morgan	
1939	Long Shot	Martha Sharon	
1939	Joe and Ethel Turp Call on the President	Kitty Crusper	
1939	The Hardys Ride High	Susan Bowen	
1940	Irene	Eleanor Worth	
1940	Flight Command	Claire	
1940	Pride and Prejudice	Mary Bennet	
1940	Ellery Queen, Master Detective	Barbara Braun	
1941	I'll Wait for You	Pauline Miller	
1941	Blossoms in the Dust	Charlotte	
1941	Unholy Partners	Gail Fenton	
1941	The Trial of Mary Dugan	Agatha Hall	
1941	Cheers for Miss Bishop	Hope Thompson	
1941	The Penalty	Katherine Logan	
1942	Kid Glove Killer	Jane Mitchell	
1942	The Affairs of Martha	Martha Lindstrom	
1942	Panama Hattie	Leila Tree	
1942	Joe Smith, American	Mary Smith	
1942	Seven Sweethearts	Regina Van Maaster	
1943	Cry 'Havoc'	Flo Norris	
1943	Lost Angel	Katie Mallory	
1943	The Human Comedy	Diana Steed	
1943	Pilot ♯5	Freddie Andrews	
1943	Thousands Cheer	Marsha Hunt (herself)	
1944	Bride by Mistake	Sylvia Lockwood	
1944	None Shall Escape	Marja Pacierkowski	
1944	Music for Millions	Rosalind	
1945	The Valley of Decision	Constance Scott	
1946	A Letter for Evie	Evie O'Connor	
1947	Carnegie Hall	Nora Ryan	
1947	Smash-Up, the Story of a Woman	Martha Gray	
1948	Raw Deal	Ann Martin	
1948	The Inside Story	Francine Taylor	
1949	Mary Ryan, Detective	Mary Ryan	
1949	Take One False Step	Martha Wier	
1949	Jigsaw	Mrs. Hartley's Secretary (uncredited)	
1952	The Happy Time	Susan Bonnard	
1952	Actors and Sin	Marcia Tillayou	
1954	Diplomatic Passport	Judy Anderson	
1955	A Word to the Wives (short)	Alice	
1956	No Place to Hide	Anne Dobson	
1957	Back from the Dead	Kate Hazelton	
1957	Bombers B-52	Edith Brennan	
1957	Legend of the Lost	(uncredited)	
1958	Alfred Hitchcock Presents	Blanche Herbert	Season 4 Episode 10: "Tea Time"
1959	Blue Denim	Jessie Bartley	
1960	The Plunderers	Katie Miller	
1964	Gunsmoke	Sarah	Episode: "The Glory and the Mud"
1964	The Outer Limits	Francesca Fields	Episode: "ZZZZZ"
1964	The Twilight Zone	Mrs. Henderson	Season 5 Episode 21: "Spur of the Moment"
1969	Fear No Evil	Mrs. Varney	
1971	Johnny Got His Gun	Joe's mother	
1987	Star Trek: The Next Generation	Anne Jameson	Season 1 Episode 16: "Too Short a Season"
2006	Chloe's Prayer	Elizabeth Lyons	
2008	The Grand Inquisitor (short)	Hazel Reedy	
2008	Empire State Building Murders	Norah Strinberg	
2014	Marsha Hunt's Sweet Adversity (documentary)	Self	

== Radio appearances ==
Year	Program	Episode/source	Character
1945	Suspense	"Pink Camellias"	
1947	Suspense	"Self Defense"	
1947	The Unexpected	"Birthday Present" 7/18/1947	Anne
1959	Suspense	"Night Man" 7/26/1959	Miss Rhodes
