= Dark August =

- Theatrical release poster
- Directed by: Martin Goldman
- Written by: J. J. Barry; Martin Goldman; Carolyne Shelyne
- Starring: J. J. Barry; Carolyne Shelyne; Kim Hunter
- Cinematography: Richard E. Brooks
- Edited by: Dennis Hayes
- Music by: William Fischer
- Production company: Raffia Productions
- Distributed by: Howard Mahler Films
- Release date: September 10, 1976
- Running time: 87 minutes
- Country: United States
- Language: English

Dark August is a 1976 American supernatural horror film directed by Martin Goldman and starring J. J. Barry, Carolyne Shelyne, and Kim Hunter. Its plot follows a man in rural Vermont who, after accidentally killing a child in a car accident, has a curse placed on him by the child's grandfather. The screenplay was co-written by actors Barry and Shelyne and director Goldman. Dark August was filmed in Vermont.

== Plot ==
Sal Devito, a visual artist from New York City, has spent a year struggling to assimilate into country life after his relocation to rural Stowe, Vermont, with his girlfriend, Jackie. Compounding his troubled adjustment is a car accident Sal was involved in shortly after moving to the town, which resulted in the death of a young girl. Though he was cleared of any wrongdoing, the child's grandfather, Ned McDermott, appears to be stalking Sal. Furthermore, Sal begins suffering inexplicable, painful physical symptoms. In one instance, Sal nearly collapses in the grocery store. He begins to suspect that McDermott has placed a curse on him.

While building his art studio with his friend, Paul, Sal is distracted by a hooded figure who appears in the woods, and inadvertently causes Paul to injure his leg. He attempts to drive Paul to hospital but crashes the car after witnessing the hooded figure again on a covered bridge. By the time the two manage to arrive at the hospital Sal is visibly shaken.

Later, Sal and Jackie have dinner with their friends, Theo and Lesley. Lesley, a clairvoyant, gives Sal a tarot reading, which suggests that he is in danger, but a woman unknown to him will come to his aid. Later, Jackie confides in Lesley that she believes Adrianna Putnam, a local psychic woman whom the townspeople have branded a witch, can help Sal. While home alone one day, Sal again witnesses the hooded figure walking along the forest edge outside his house. He follows the mysterious figure as it crosses a creek and ventures deeper into the woods, but it does not respond to his repeated yells.

Following several further physical attacks, Sal visits Adrianna, accompanied by Jackie and Lesley. Adrianna confirms Sal's suspicions that McDermott has cast a curse against him. She advises Sal to burn his unfinished art studio to the ground as this was the first place he witnessed the hooded figure that seems to be following him, a figure Adrianna believes is demonic. Sal heeds her advice and sets his studio on fire but the local fire department arrives and puts out the blaze. When he tries to stop them, Sal is arrested.

A desperate Jackie goes to visit McDermott, hoping to convince him to undo the curse against Sal. In his home, she finds a variety of tools and items that suggest that he practises witchcraft. McDermott appears and attacks Jackie, and she flees in terror. She visits Adrianna for help and she asks Jackie to bring Sal back to her home with Theo and Lesley so that they can participate in a ritual to protect him. Adrianna has the four drink from a goblet before reciting the Lord's Prayer; she explains that the purpose of the ritual is to transform the negative energy attached to Sal into something positive. Adrianna begins an incantation but is shot dead in the midst of it by McDermott, who has arrived at the house. His attempt to abort the ritual fails, however, as the demonic force he had cursed Sal with turns against him.

Some time later, Sal again witnesses the hooded figure in the woods behind his home. He approaches it, armed with a shotgun. Suddenly, Sal's dog senses something awry and begins to attack him. To save himself from being mauled, Sal shoots the dog. He collapses and comforts his dog as it dies.

== Cast ==
- Kim Hunter as Adrianna Putnam
- J. J. Barry as Sal Devito
- Carolyne Barry as Jackie (as Carole Shelyne)
- Kate McKeown as Lesley
- Frank Bongiorno as Theo
- William Robertson as Ned McDermott
- Karen Lewis as the child

== Release ==
Dark August was released regionally in theaters, opening in Shreveport, Louisiana on September 10, 1976, and on September 17, in San Antonio, Texas. It was distributed by Howard Mahler Films, an independent company that mainly released kung fu films and action movies.

Arrow Video released Dark August on Blu-ray in 2019 as part of their three-film American Horror Project, Volume 2 box set.
