= Ralph E. Winters =

Canadian film editor

- Ralph E. Winters (1961)
- Born: Ralph Ethan Winters; June 17, 1909; Toronto, Ontario, Canada
- Died: February 26, 2004 (aged 94); Los Angeles, California, United States
- Occupation: film editor
- Years active: 1941–1995
- Spouses: Teddy (m. 1935; died 1985) Lulu Winters (m. 1988; died 2004)

Ralph Ethan Winters (June 17, 1909 – February 26, 2004) was a Canadian-born film editor who became one of the leading figures of this field in the American industry.

After beginning on a series of B movies in the early 1940s, including several in the Dr. Kildare series, his first major film was George Cukor's Victorian chiller Gaslight (1944).

Winters won the Academy Award for Best Film Editing for King Solomon's Mines (1950) (shared with Conrad A. Nervig) and Ben-Hur (1959) (shared with John D. Dunning). He received four additional nominations: Quo Vadis (1951), Seven Brides for Seven Brothers (1954), The Great Race (1965) and Kotch (1971). Winters' other films included On the Town (1949), High Society (1956), Jailhouse Rock (1957) and The Thomas Crown Affair (1968).

Winters had a notable collaboration with director Blake Edwards. Over 20 years, they collaborated on 12 films together, including The Pink Panther (1963), The Party (1968), 10 (1979) and Victor/Victoria (1982). His last film was the pirate epic Cutthroat Island in 1995.

Winters had been elected to membership in the American Cinema Editors, and in 1991, Winters received the organization's career achievement award. His memoir, Some Cutting Remarks: Seventy Years a Film Editor, was published in 2001.

== Selected filmography ==
Based on Winters' filmography at the Internet Database.

Editor
Year	Film	Director	Notes	Other notes
1941	The Penalty	Harold S. Bucquet	First collaboration with Harold S. Bucquet	
1941	The People vs. Dr. Kildare	Harold S. Bucquet	Second collaboration with Harold S. Bucquet	
1942	Mr. and Mrs. North	Robert B. Sinclair		
1942	Kid Glove Killer	Fred Zinnemann	First collaboration with Fred Zinnemann	
1942	The Affairs of Martha	Jules Dassin	First collaboration with Jules Dassin	
1942	Eyes in the Night	Fred Zinnemann	Second collaboration with Fred Zinnemann	
1942	Dr. Gillespie's New Assistant	Willis Goldbeck		
1943	The Youngest Profession	Edward Buzzell		
1943	Young Ideas	Jules Dassin	Second collaboration with Jules Dassin	
1943	Cry 'Havoc'	Richard Thorpe	First collaboration with Richard Thorpe	
1944	Gaslight	George Cukor		
1944	The Thin Man Goes Home	Richard Thorpe	Second collaboration with Richard Thorpe	
1945	Our Vines Have Tender Grapes	Roy Rowland	First collaboration with Roy Rowland	
1946	Boys' Ranch	Roy Rowland	Second collaboration with Roy Rowland	
1947	The Romance of Rosy Ridge	Roy Rowland	Third collaboration with Roy Rowland	
1947	Killer McCoy	Roy Rowland	Fourth collaboration with Roy Rowland	
1948	Tenth Avenue Angel	Roy Rowland	Fifth collaboration with Roy Rowland	
1948	Hills of Home	Fred M. Wilcox		
1949	Little Women	Mervyn LeRoy	First collaboration with Mervyn LeRoy	
1949	Any Number Can Play	Mervyn LeRoy	Second collaboration with Mervyn LeRoy	
1949	On the Town	Gene Kelly; Stanley Donen	First collaboration with Stanley Donen	
1950	King Solomon's Mines	Compton Bennett; Andrew Marton		
1951	Quo Vadis	Mervyn LeRoy	Third collaboration with Mervyn LeRoy	
1953	The Story of Three Loves	Vincente Minnelli; Gottfried Reinhardt		
1953	Young Bess	George Sidney	First collaboration with George Sidney	
1953	Kiss Me Kate	George Sidney	Second collaboration with George Sidney	
1954	Executive Suite	Robert Wise	First collaboration with Robert Wise	
1954	Seven Brides for Seven Brothers	Stanley Donen	Second collaboration with Stanley Donen	
1955	Jupiter's Darling	George Sidney	Third collaboration with George Sidney	
1955	Love Me or Leave Me	Charles Vidor		
1956	Tribute to a Bad Man	Robert Wise	Second collaboration with Robert Wise	
1956	High Society	Charles Walters		
1957	Man on Fire	Ranald MacDougall		
1957	Jailhouse Rock	Richard Thorpe	Third collaboration with Richard Thorpe	
1958	The Sheepman	George Marshall		
1959	Ben-Hur	William Wyler		
1960	BUtterfield 8	Daniel Mann	First collaboration with Daniel Mann	
1961	Ada	Daniel Mann	Second collaboration with Daniel Mann	
1963	Dime with a Halo	Boris Sagal		
1963	Soldier in the Rain	Ralph Nelson		
1963	The Pink Panther	Blake Edwards	First collaboration with Blake Edwards	
1964	A Shot in the Dark	Blake Edwards	Second collaboration with Blake Edwards	
1965	The Great Race	Blake Edwards	Third collaboration with Blake Edwards	
1966	What Did You Do in the War, Daddy?	Blake Edwards	Fourth collaboration with Blake Edwards	
1967	How to Succeed in Business Without Really Trying	David Swift		
1967	Fitzwilly	Delbert Mann		
1968	The Party	Blake Edwards	Fifth collaboration with Blake Edwards	
1968	The Thomas Crown Affair	Norman Jewison	First collaboration with Norman Jewison	
1969	Gaily, Gaily	Norman Jewison	Second collaboration with Norman Jewison	
1970	The Hawaiians	Tom Gries		
1971	Kotch	Jack Lemmon		
1972	The Carey Treatment	Blake Edwards	Sixth collaboration with Blake Edwards	
1972	Avanti!	Billy Wilder	First collaboration with Billy Wilder	
1973	The Outfit	John Flynn		
1973	The All-American Boy	Charles Eastman		
1974	The Spikes Gang	Richard Fleischer	First collaboration with Richard Fleischer	
1974	Mr. Majestyk	Richard Fleischer	Second collaboration with Richard Fleischer	
1974	The Front Page	Billy Wilder	Second collaboration with Billy Wilder	
1976	King Kong	John Guillermin		
1977	Orca	Michael Anderson		
1979	The American Success Company	William Richert		
1979	10	Blake Edwards	Seventh collaboration with Blake Edwards	
1981	S.O.B.	Blake Edwards	Eighth collaboration with Blake Edwards	
1982	Victor/Victoria	Blake Edwards	Ninth collaboration with Blake Edwards	
1982	Trail of the Pink Panther	Blake Edwards	Tenth collaboration with Blake Edwards	Uncredited
1983	Curse of the Pink Panther	Blake Edwards	Eleventh collaboration with Blake Edwards	
1983	The Man Who Loved Women	Blake Edwards	Twelfth collaboration with Blake Edwards	
1984	Micki & Maude	Blake Edwards	Thirteenth collaboration with Blake Edwards	
1986	Big Trouble	John Cassavetes		
1986	Let's Get Harry	Stuart Rosenberg		
1995	Cutthroat Island	Renny Harlin		

Editorial department
Year	Film	Director	Role	Notes
1928	Four Walls	William Nigh	Assistant editor	
1929	The Thirteenth Chair	Tod Browning	Assistant editor	Uncredited
1929	Their Own Desire	E. Mason Hopper	Assistant editor	Uncredited

Actor
Year	Film	Director	Role	Notes
1947	Intrigue	Edwin L. Marin	Air Force Pilot at Bar	Uncredited

Additional crew
Year	Film	Director	Role
1987	Jane and the Lost City	Terry Marcel	Special consultant

Thanks
Year	Film	Director	Role
1987	Disorderlies	Michael Schultz	Special thanks

TV movies

Editor
Year	Film	Director
1975	The Entertainer	Donald Wrye
1978	The Other Side of Hell	Ján Kadár
1991	Tagget	Richard T. Heffron
1993	Trouble Shooters: Trapped Beneath the Earth	Bradford May
1994	Lily in Winter	Delbert Mann

TV series

Editor
Year	Title	Notes
1962	Combat!	1 episode

Additional crew
Year	Title	Role	Notes
1962	Combat!	Production assistant	1 episode

== See also ==
- List of film director and editor collaborations
