= Home Soil =

- Star Trek: The Next Generation episode
- Episode no.: Season 1 Episode 18
- Directed by: Corey Allen
- Story by: Robert Sabaroff; Karl Geurs; Ralph Sanchez
- Teleplay by: Robert Sabaroff
- Cinematography by: Edward R. Brown
- Production code: 117
- Original air date: February 22, 1988

Guest appearances
- Walter Gotell as Kurt Mandl; Elizabeth Lindsey as Luisa Kim; Gerard Prendergast as Bjorn Bensen; Mario Roccuzzo as Arthur Malencon; Carolyne Barry as Female Engineer

Episode chronology
| ← Previous "When the Bough Breaks" | Next → "Coming of Age" |
- Star Trek: The Next Generation season 1

"Home Soil" is the eighteenth episode of the American science fiction television series Star Trek: The Next Generation. It first aired in broadcast syndication on February 22, 1988. Robert Sabaroff, Karl Geurs and Ralph Sanchez developed the story, with Sabaroff producing the teleplay. "Home Soil" is one of five episodes of the series directed by Corey Allen.

In the episode, the crew of the Enterprise investigates the murder of a crewman on a terraforming colony and discover a crystalline life form possessing intelligence.

The production team encountered problems with the sets, casting, and scheduling. Due to issues with the script, it was delivered to Allen just one day before shooting. Nine million viewers watched the episode, the second lowest number of viewers for the first season of The Next Generation. Critical reception was mixed, with one reviewer noting that unlike the original Star Trek series, "Home Soil" explored the realm of hard science fiction. Critics compared the appearance of inorganic life forms in the story to the plot of the original Star Trek series episode "The Devil in the Dark".

== Plot ==
Diverted from exploring the Pleiades, the Enterprise arrives at the terraforming colony on Velara III, as the project is behind schedule. The director, Kurt Mandl (Walter Gotell), insists they are on time but Captain Jean-Luc Picard (Patrick Stewart) orders an away team to the surface after Counselor Deanna Troi (Marina Sirtis) senses that Mandl is hiding something. After they arrive, one of Mandl's team is killed by a malfunctioning laser drill. During Lt. Commander Data's (Brent Spiner) inspection of the tool, it begins to fire at him, but his quick android reflexes allow him to dodge the shot and render the drill harmless. He discovers that the laser had been reprogrammed to fire upon the staff. Nearby, a crystal is discovered giving off irregular light and radiation patterns. The crystal is brought aboard the Enterprise to study and Picard orders a halt to the terraforming.

Dr. Beverly Crusher (Gates McFadden) and Data discover the crystal may be alive. When the crystal attempts to interact with the Enterprise's computers, it is placed into a containment force field. The crystal begins to grow and gains access to the computer's translation program and attempts to communicate with the crew, treating the humans as an enemy, derisively calling them "ugly giant bags of mostly water". Picard discovers that Mandl and his team previously encountered the crystals; at the time, they had considered the possibility that the crystals were alive, but Mandl insisted on continuing to terraform. The terraformers used a drilling process responsible for removing the saline water layer from the water table of Velara III. This saline layer acted as a conductor, allowing many separate crystals to function as one life form. In a defensive response to the drilling, the crystal life form rewrote the laser's software and attacked the terraformers.

Dr. Crusher hypothesizes that a single crystal is not intelligent, but when linked to other crystals, their intelligence is formidable. As the crystalline life form accesses higher-level functions of the Enterprise's computer, Picard and the crew try to transport it to the surface but the crystal blocks all attempts to transport it off the ship. Data and Lt. Geordi La Forge (LeVar Burton) discover the presence of cadmium in the crystal and suspect it has photoelectric properties. They disable the lights in the medical lab and the crystal immediately begs for life. Picard peacefully negotiates to return the crystal life form to the surface of the planet where Starfleet will institute a quarantine, leaving the life form to live in peace.

== Production ==
Re-writes on "Home Soil" continued throughout shooting, with Corey Allen receiving pages on the day before filming, something that Allen described as a "struggle". Of the story in general, The Next Generation writer and producer Maurice Hurley said it was "An interesting idea, but the execution fell apart." He felt that in addition to the script, there were issues with casting, sets and the time in which to shoot. The story bears similarities to the Space: 1999 episode "All That Glisters", which also featured intelligent water-ingesting rocks that communicated with humanoids.

Andrew Probert created a matte painting of the outside of the terraforming station which never made it into the show. The guest stars in "Home Soil" included Walter Gotell, who was better known for appearing in the James Bond film franchise as General Gogol. The crystalline life form's description for humanoids in the episode spawned the phrase, "ugly bags of mostly water", which has been used as the title of a documentary about Star Trek fans, and as the name of a song by the band Streetnix, as well as being referenced by Dream Warriors in the lyrics of My Definition of a Boombastic Jazz Theme.

== Reception ==
I think "Home Soil" works, and works well, and it's a terrific example of a kind of story that the TOS never really delved into: hard sci-fi. It's called "hard" because it takes existing knowledge and projects only slightly outwards from it, instead of just throwing in a few words like "space" and "lasers" to make it all seem technological. Kirk's Enterprise ran into all sorts of aliens and oddities, but while it did make overtures to more grounded writing, you never got the impression any of the writers on the show did serious research before putting plots together.

— Zack Handlen, The A.V. Club, May 14, 2010

The episode first aired on February 22, 1988. It received Nielsen ratings of 9 million on the first broadcast, which was a decrease of over a million from the previous episode "When the Bough Breaks", which received ratings of 10.2 during the previous week. The next new episode was broadcast three weeks later, when "Coming of Age" gained ratings of 10.1 million. "Home Soil" was the second lowest viewed episode of the first season, with "The Last Outpost" viewed by 100,000 fewer viewers.

Several reviewers re-watched the episode after the end of the series. Keith DeCandido reviewed the episode for Tor.com, saying that "while this episode has its flaws, it's a wonderful example of science fiction, one that doesn't skimp on suspense, action, and Trek's trademark compassion." He didn't like the film direction by Allen, saying that the director had a "bizarre insistence on unnatural, stage-y blocking and positioning and obsession with extreme closeups". DeCandido also thought that the plot suffered "amnesia regarding the Horta" from The Original Series episode "The Devil in the Dark". He gave "Home Soil" an overall score of seven out of ten. Michelle Erica Green, in her review for TrekNation, thought that the episode was "less interesting" than the "Horta attacks and mind-melds" of "The Devil in the Dark". She also felt "Home Soil" was too similar "in the science fiction and in the storytelling" to the previous episode, "When the Bough Breaks".

Zack Handlen, who watched the episode for The A.V. Club, thought that the "hard sci-fi" worked well as it was an area that The Original Series never went near. He thought that the story was different enough from "The Devil in the Dark" – although the Horta was silicon based, it was at least easily recognisable as an alien creature. "This makes it less exciting as a creature, but more intriguing as an idea," Handlen argues. While he felt that the episode was a "winner", he conceded that it was "a bit on the dry side". James Hunt, writing for the website Den of Geek, noted that the Enterprise fought a space-bound crystalline entity several episodes earlier in "Datalore", which he considered "a lot more impressive than these crystal microbrains... Okay, it wouldn't talk to them, but nor did it die the moment someone switched the frickin' lights off." He felt that "Home Soil" was a generic Star Trek episode and thought that it was similar to The Original Series in tone.

== Home media release ==
"Home Soil" was first released on VHS cassette in the United States and Canada on August 26, 1992. The episode was later included on the Star Trek: The Next Generation season one DVD box set, released in March 2002. The season one Blu-ray set was released on July 24, 2012.
