= When the Bough Breaks (Star Trek: The Next Generation) =

- Star Trek: The Next Generation episode
- Episode no.: Season 1 Episode 17
- Directed by: Kim Manners
- Written by: Hannah Louise Shearer
- Cinematography by: Edward R. Brown
- Production code: 118
- Original air date: February 15, 1988
- Running time: 45 minutes (runtime)

Guest appearances
- Jerry Hardin – Radue; Brenda Strong – Rashella; Jandi Swanson – Katie; Paul Lambert – Melian; Ivy Bethune – Duana; Dierk Torsek – Dr. Bernard; Michèle Marsh – Leda; Dan Mason – Accolan; Philip N. Waller – Harry; Connie Danese – Toya; Jessica Bova, Vanessa Bova – Alexandra

Episode chronology
← Previous "Too Short a Season"	Next → "Home Soil"
- Star Trek: The Next Generation season 1

"When the Bough Breaks" is the seventeenth episode of the American science fiction television series Star Trek: The Next Generation. The episode first aired in broadcast syndication on February 15, 1988. It is the first episode written for the series by Hannah Louise Shearer and the only episode of the series with Kim Manners as director.

Set in the 24th century, the series follows the adventures of the Starfleet crew of the Federation starship Enterprise-D. In the episode, the residents of a not-so-mythical planet kidnap children from the Enterprise to re-populate their dying world. While Captain Jean-Luc Picard (Patrick Stewart) attempts to negotiate for their release, Wesley Crusher (Wil Wheaton) organizes a passive resistance among the children.

The episode features Jerry Hardin in his first Star Trek role (later as Samuel Clemens in Time's Arrow), and Brenda Strong. McKenzie Westmore, the daughter of make-up supervisor Michael Westmore, along with Jeremy and Amy Wheaton, the younger brother and sister of Wil Wheaton, appear as uncredited children (with character names of Rose, Mason, and Tara, respectively, as listed in the script). 10.2 million viewers watched the episode, which was higher than the number of viewers watching the following episode. "When the Bough Breaks" received a mixed reception from critics who praised the performances of Stewart and Wheaton, but criticized the lack of subtlety in its environmental message.

== Plot ==
The Enterprise enters the Epsilon Mynos system, searching for the legendary world of Aldea. The planet de-cloaks, and reveals itself to the ship. The Aldeans beam down Commander William Riker (Jonathan Frakes), Counselor Deanna Troi (Marina Sirtis), and Chief Medical Officer Beverly Crusher (Gates McFadden) to the planet. The Aldeans explain that they have been unable to bear children for many years and revealed themselves to the Enterprise in hopes they could trade their advanced technology for some of the Enterprise's children so that they can re-populate their world. Riker refuses and the crew is returned to the Enterprise. Simultaneously, seven children, including Wesley Crusher (Wil Wheaton), are taken down to the planet protected by a planetary energy shield that the crew of the Enterprise are unable to penetrate. While the Aldean elders attempt to integrate the children into their society, Wesley is shown the "Custodian", an ancient computer system that the Aldeans rely on but do not understand.

As Captain Jean-Luc Picard (Patrick Stewart) attempts to negotiate with the Aldeans, they briefly allow Dr. Crusher to reunite with her son on the planet. Wesley hints about the Custodian to her, while she secretly passes him a tricorder to scan the Aldeans. After Picard fails to get the Aldeans to agree to the children's return, they fire an energy weapon that sends the Enterprise three days away from Aldea at maximum warp. The Aldeans warn that they can send the Enterprise an impossibly far distance if they refuse to cooperate. During the return trip, Dr. Crusher reviews the scanner results and finds the Aldeans are suffering from radiation poisoning, which has harmed their reproductive capabilities but can be reversed if the source is discovered. On arrival back at the planet, Picard orders the crew to try to find a way through the planet's shield while he restarts negotiations.

Wesley, aware the Enterprise is in orbit, arranges for the children to passively resist. When the Aldeans request Picard's help to resolve the issue with the children, the crew finds a way to beam through the shield, allowing Commander Riker and Lt. Commander Data (Brent Spiner) to sneak onto the planet. Data manages to disable the Custodian, disrupting the Aldean's transporter and planetary shield. Dr. Crusher explains to the Aldeans that their shield has weakened the ozone layer of their planet, exposing the inhabitants to ultraviolet radiation that has left them unable to bear children. The radiation would likely have the same effects on the children from the Enterprise. Without the planetary shield, the ozone layer will naturally return, allowing the Aldeans to reproduce again. The Aldeans accept the error of their ways and return the children to the Enterprise. Starfleet offers to help to correct their ancient systems and recognize that they will have to forgo their invisibility to continue their society.

== Production ==
Writer Hannah Louise Shearer pitched the episode to associate producer D. C. Fontana, highlighting the families (Note: The series bible mentioned the use of families as a change from The Original Series. In the twenty-fourth century, "The starship is designed to be home (home in a very literal sense) to 1012 persons. Gone is the metallic sterility of the original ship.... Starfleet has begun encouraging crewpersons to share the space exploration adventure with their families.") living on board the Enterprise. While the pilot episode "Encounter at Farpoint" first mentioned the children on the ship, "When the Bough Breaks" was the first time they had been used as a plot element. Shearer also discussed a story idea with series creator Gene Roddenberry about "a society that had lost its humanity in favor of technology". Originally, there was a subplot involving the separation of the saucer section with the saucer taken hostage. Shearer described Wheaton's performance in the episode as "just wonderful". "When the Bough Breaks" was the first of five episodes credited to Shearer; she later described it as her favourite episode. It was the only episode of the series directed by Kim Manners. Manners later produced the television series The X-Files and Supernatural.

Among the guest stars in "When the Bough Breaks" were Jerry Hardin who later appeared again in The Next Generation as Mark Twain in the two-part episode "Time's Arrow", and appeared in The X-Files as Deep Throat. Brenda Strong went on to appear as Mary Alice Young in 179 episodes of Desperate Housewives, and was nominated for two Emmy Awards. Several uncredited children appeared, including McKenzie Westmore, the daughter of make-up supervisor Michael Westmore, and the younger siblings of Wil Wheaton, Jeremy and Amy.

Visual effects supervisor Robert Legato created a two-foot (0.61 m) model of the Aldean computer. It was cheaper to build a model of the computer for around US$3,000 than to create a series of matte paintings. Ron Jones took a simple approach to the score, using a lilting theme with a piano or flute instead of singing. The theme is representative of the Enterprise's children and first appeared in the opening cue, "Escape From Calculus". The technology of Aldea is embodied by electronic music across several pieces, including "Scanning for Children" and "Power Source". Legato also constructed a model of the Aldean power source. Legato's visual effects for this episode were showcased in the Reading Rainbow episode "The Bionic Bunny Show".

== Reception ==
The episode first aired on February 15, 1988. It received Nielsen ratings of 10.2 million on the first broadcast, a ratings decrease following "Too Short a Season", which received ratings of 10.9 the previous week. The episode received higher ratings than the following episode, "Home Soil" the week after, which gained ratings of 9 million.

Several reviewers re-watched the episode after the end of the series. Keith DeCandido of Tor.com said it was "A mostly harmless episode that lifts quite a bit from The Cliché Handbook". He thought the performances were fairly solid and that the overall message about the ozone layer was "unsubtle but not too sledgehammery". DeCandido praised Patrick Stewart's performance of Captain Picard, noting that his "anger and outrage and justified self-righteousness at the kidnapping of children modulates nicely into diplomacy when negotiating with the Aldeans and amusingly into total discomfort when he has to actually deal directly with the children". He gave the episode a score of six out of ten. James Hunt, writing for Den of Geek, said that it was "a decent enough story, but not in a way that makes you want to watch it". He also felt that it was "a complete throwaway episode and contains almost nothing unique to the franchise".

Zack Handlen of The A.V. Club said that he was scared by the way he liked the episode despite it focusing on Wesley. He noticed the similarity between the "legendary" planets of Aldea in the episode and Magrathea in The Hitchhiker's Guide to the Galaxy, a reference Handlen considered possibly deliberate. He thought that the child-heavy episode wasn't "as bad as it could've been", and gave the episode a "B" grade. Michelle Erica Green in her review for TrekNation, described "When the Bough Breaks" as "tedious, plodding and didactic" with a "preposterous" ending. She thought that the plot element of ozone damage was not optimal and that the quality of the episode was typical of the first season.

== Home media release ==
"When the Bough Breaks" was first released on VHS cassette in the United States and Canada on August 26, 1992. The episode was released in March 2002 on the Star Trek: The Next Generation season one DVD box set. It was included as part of the season one Blu-ray set on July 24, 2012.
