= Joe and Ethel Turp Call on the President =

1939 film directed by Robert B. Sinclair

- Theatrical release poster
- Directed by: Robert B. Sinclair
- Screenplay by: Melville Baker
- Story by: Damon Runyon
- Produced by: Edgar Selwyn
- Starring: Ann Sothern; Lewis Stone; Walter Brennan; William Gargan; Marsha Hunt; Tom Neal
- Cinematography: Leonard Smith
- Edited by: Gene Ruggiero
- Music by: David Snell; Edward Ward
- Production company: Metro-Goldwyn-Mayer
- Distributed by: Metro-Goldwyn-Mayer
- Release date: December 1, 1939
- Running time: 70 minutes
- Country: United States
- Language: English

Joe and Ethel Turp Call on the President is a 1939 American comedy film directed by Robert B. Sinclair and written by Melville Baker. The film stars Ann Sothern, Lewis Stone, Walter Brennan, William Gargan, Marsha Hunt and Tom Neal. It was released on December 1, 1939, by Metro-Goldwyn-Mayer.

== Plot ==
Brooklynites Ethel and Joe Turp visit Washington, D.C. to petition the president to pardon their mailman Jim, who accidentally destroyed a registered letter.

== Cast ==
- Ann Sothern as Ethel Turp
- Lewis Stone as the President
- Walter Brennan as Jim
- William Gargan as Joe Turp
- Marsha Hunt as Kitty Crusper
- Tom Neal as Johnny Crusper
- James Bush as Henry Crusper
- Don Costello as Fred
- Muriel Hutchison as Francine La Vaughn
- Jack Norton as Parker
- Aldrich Bowker as Mike O'Brien
- Frederick Burton as Bishop Bannon
- Al Shean as Father Reicher
- Robert Emmett O'Connor as Pat Donegan
- Cliff Clark as Garage Owner
- Russell Hicks as Mr. Graves
- Paul Everton as Senator
- Charles Trowbridge as Cabinet Member
- Louis Jean Heydt as Dr. Standish (uncredited)
- Tim Davis as Jackie (uncredited)
