= Partners in Crime (1937 film) =

1937 film by Ralph Murphy

- Theatrical release poster
- Directed by: Ralph Murphy
- Screenplay by: Gladys Unger; Garnett Weston
- Produced by: Harold Hurley
- Starring: Lynne Overman; Roscoe Karns; Muriel Hutchison; Anthony Quinn; Inez Courtney; Lucien Littlefield
- Cinematography: Henry Sharp
- Edited by: Eda Warren
- Production company: Paramount Pictures
- Distributed by: Paramount Pictures
- Release date: October 8, 1937
- Running time: 66 minutes
- Country: United States
- Language: English

Partners in Crime is a 1937 American crime film directed by Ralph Murphy and written by Gladys Unger and Garnett Weston. The film stars Lynne Overman, Roscoe Karns, Muriel Hutchison, Anthony Quinn, Inez Courtney and Lucien Littlefield. The film was released on October 8, 1937, by Paramount Pictures.

Karns and Overman repeated their private-eye characters from Murder Goes to College, released earlier that year.

== Cast ==
- Lynne Overman as Hank Hyer
- Roscoe Karns as Sim Perkins
- Muriel Hutchison as Odette Le Vin
- Anthony Quinn as Nicholas Mazaney
- Inez Courtney as Lillian Tate
- Lucien Littlefield as Mr. Twitchell
- Charles Halton as Silas Wagon
- Charles C. Wilson as Inspector Simpson
- June Brewster as Mabel
- Esther Howard as Mrs. Wagon
- Nora Cecil as Housekeeper
- Russell Hicks as Mayor Callahan
- Don Brodie as Reporter
- Archie Twitchell as Photographer
