= Muriel Hutchison =

American actress

- Born: February 10, 1915; Manhattan, New York City, New York, U.S.
- Died: March 24, 1975 (aged 60); Manhattan, New York City, New York, U.S.
- Occupation: Actress
- Years active: 1937–1952
- Spouse: John P. Nicholson (1953–1962) (his death)

Muriel Hutchison (February 10, 1915 – March 24, 1975) was an American stage and film actress.

A stage actress in the 1930s, 1940s and 1950s, she also appeared in the films Partners in Crime, ...One Third of a Nation..., Another Thin Man, Joe and Ethel Turp Call on the President, and The Women (as Norma Shearer's character's sympathetic maid, Jane).

Broadway plays in which Hutchison appeared included The Vigil (1948), Proof Thro' the Night (1942), The Land Is Bright (1941), The Man Who Came to Dinner (1939), Lightnin' (1938), Merely Murder (1937), The Amazing Dr. Clitterhouse (1937), and The Sap Runs High (1936).

Hutchison died of cancer on March 24, 1975, in Manhattan, New York City, New York at age 60.

== Filmography ==
Year	Title	Role	Notes
1937	Partners in Crime	Odette Le Vin	
1939	...One Third of a Nation...	Ethel Cortlant	
1939	The Women	Jane	
1939	Another Thin Man	Smitty	
1939	Joe and Ethel Turp Call on the President	Francine La Vaughn aka Jennie	
