= Alfred Neumann (writer) =

German writer

- Born: 15 October 1895; Lautenburg, Germany
- Died: 3 October 1952 (aged 56); Lugano, Switzerland
- Occupations: Novelist; Playwright

Alfred Neumann (15 October 1895 – 3 October 1952) was a German writer of novels, stories, poems, plays, and films, as well as a translator into German.

== Biography ==
Neumann was born in Lautenburg, Germany (now Poland). He was a recipient of the Kleist Prize in 1926 and his writings were banned during the Third Reich. His novel Der Patriot was turned into a play and filmed in 1928, directed by Ernst Lubitsch. The film was remade in France in 1938 directed by Maurice Tourneur.

He was working in Italy when Adolf Hitler came to power in 1933. The Nazi party seized all his property due to his Jewish heritage. He remained in Italy until 1938 when he moved to France. The French film La Tragédie impériale (1938), was based on his novel.

He moved to Los Angeles in 1941 and became a US citizen, where he stayed until 1949. His work as a screenwriter included None Shall Escape (1944), Conflict (1945), and The Return of Monte Cristo (1946). Neumann produced the first successful stage adaptation of War and Peace in 1942. His novels included King Haber and The Devil.

Neumann was married to a Swiss dancer. They divorced and he then married the daughter of Georg Müller, the publisher, who published Neumann's first book of verse.

He died in Lugano, Switzerland, aged 56.

Books published (incomplete list):

- Life of Christina of Sweden
- Man of December
- Mirror of fools
- New Caesar
- The friends of the people
- Six of them
- The Devil
