= Mario Roccuzzo =

American actor (1940–2021)

- Born: November 9, 1940; Boston, Massachusetts, U.S.
- Died: October 9, 2021 (aged 80); West Hollywood, California, U.S.
- Occupation: Actor
- Years active: 1960–2016

Mario Roccuzzo (November 9, 1940 – October 9, 2021) was an American actor, most commonly known for his episodic roles on television police dramas, although he played various parts on significant sitcoms and in films. His appearances include Hill Street Blues, Barney Miller, and NYPD Blue, as well as Star Trek: The Next Generation and The Untouchables. He had over 250 television roles, and a dozen in feature films. In addition, in 1958, Roccuzzo wrote the famous Eddie Cochran rock song, "Nervous Breakdown".

== Biography ==
Roccuzzo's parents were both actors working in an East Coast Italian repertory, inspiring him to take the acting career path at an early age. When Mario was 10, his father died and his mother relocated the family to California, where he began taking night classes for acting, first with Jeff Corey, then Corey Allen. In 1960, at the age of 20, he appeared, uninvited, in the office of director John Frankenheimer of Columbia Studios, asking for a chance to audition for whatever film he was making next. This led to his first big break, playing Diavolo in the film The Young Savages.

Next, he played Nicky on the top television show, The Untouchables. He initially became typecast in "bad guy" roles, but this gradually expanded to general roles in police/crime shows, both drama and comedy.

== Filmography ==
This filmography is very incomplete. For the complete list, check here.

Roles
Year	Title	Role	Notes
1960	The Untouchables	Nicky Bousso	
1961	The Young Savages	Diavolo	Uncredited
1962	Target: The Corruptors	Tony McLaughlin	Episode: The Malignant Hearts
1963	The Lieutenant	Private Brian Barducci	Two different episodes
1966	The Monkees	Kiko	S1:E16, Son of a Gypsy
1972	All in the Family	Angelo	Episode: The Locket
1974	Wonder Woman	Walter	
1976	Serpico	Pasquale Serpico	Episode: The Deadly Game
1975–77	Police Story	Multiple characters	Four different episodes
1975–77	Baretta	Joey Perino	Two different episodes
1978	B.J. and the Bear	"High ranking suit"	Episode: The Foundlings
1979	Kaz		Episode: Conspiracy in Blue
1978–82	Barney Miller	Multiple characters	Six different episodes
1983	Hill Street Blues	Andrews	Episode: Goodbye, Mr. Scripps
1982–84	Alice	Multiple characters	3 different episodes
1985	Night Court	Mario Eisenhower	Episode: Halloween, Too
1985	Tales from the Darkside	Henry Colander	Episode: Anniversary Dinner
1985–88	Mr. Belvedere	Various characters	5 different episodes
1988	Star Trek: The Next Generation	Arthur Malencon	Episode: Home Soil
1989	Murder, She Wrote	Wino	Episode: Smooth Operators
