= The Penalty (1941 film) =

1941 film by Harold S. Bucquet

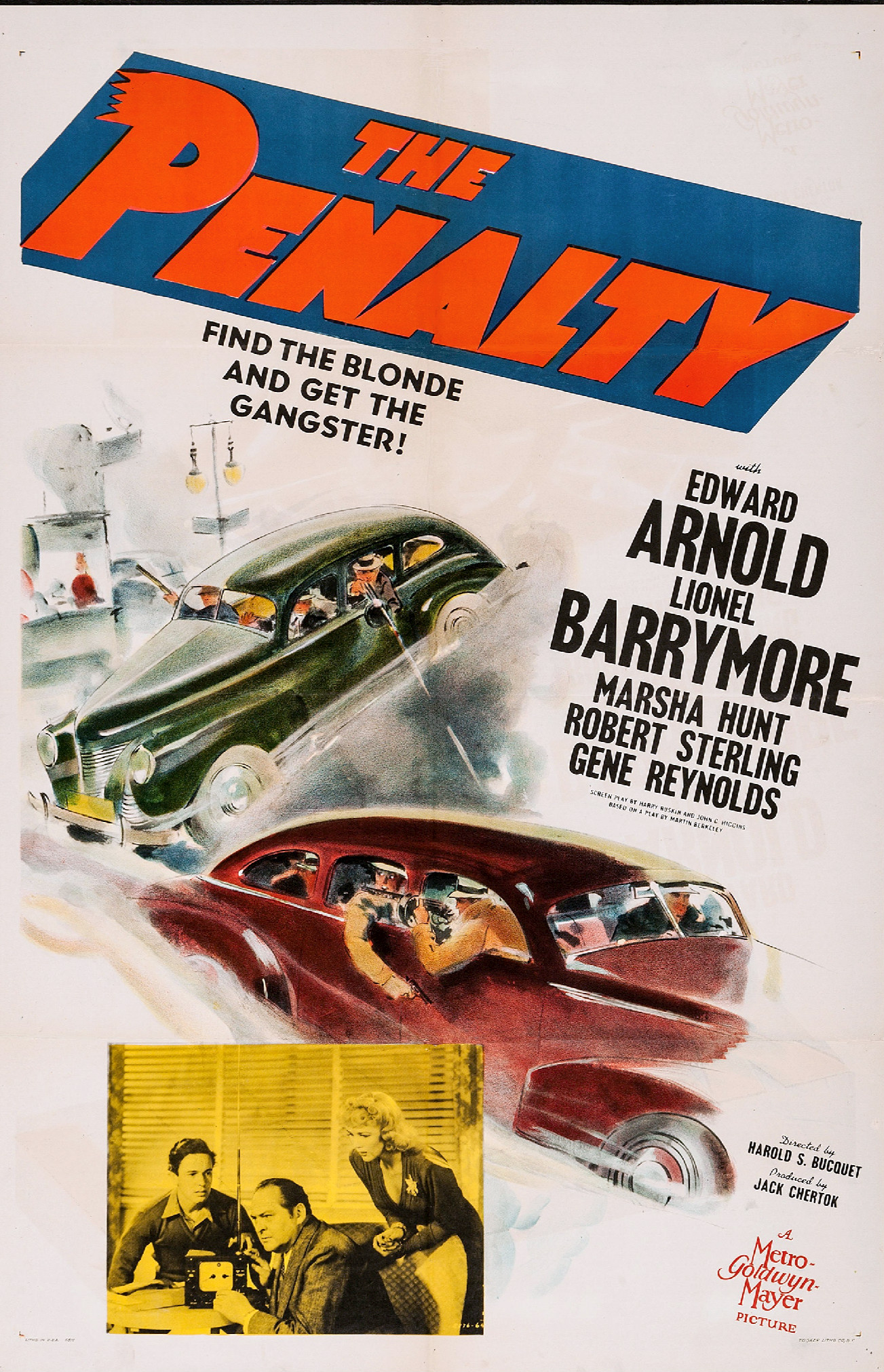
- Theatrical release poster
- Directed by: Harold S. Bucquet
- Screenplay by: Harry Ruskin; John C. Higgins
- Based on: Roosty by Martin Berkeley
- Produced by: Jack Chertok
- Starring: Edward Arnold; Lionel Barrymore; Marsha Hunt; Robert Sterling; Gene Reynolds; Emma Dunn
- Cinematography: Harold Rosson
- Edited by: Ralph E. Winters
- Music by: David Snell
- Production company: Metro-Goldwyn-Mayer
- Distributed by: Metro-Goldwyn-Mayer
- Release date: March 14, 1941
- Running time: 80 minutes
- Country: United States
- Language: English

The Penalty is a 1941 American crime film directed by Harold S. Bucquet and written by Harry Ruskin and John C. Higgins. The film stars Edward Arnold, Lionel Barrymore, Marsha Hunt, Robert Sterling, Gene Reynolds and Emma Dunn. The film was released on March 14, 1941, by Metro-Goldwyn-Mayer.

== Plot ==
A gangster hires men to do some work, states they are going to the bank then holds up the bank (unknownst to the workers). The gangster, "Stuff" Nelson, leaves the workers wondering what happened.

A 16-year-old boy visits his father's girlfriend, who loves furs. Roosty loves his father, who is a gangster and does not think twice about shooting people. At a cabin in the woods, there is a shootout and the girlfriend is killed. Roosty, the boy, is captured and sent to reform school. He is later sent to live with a family on a farm and has a hard time adjusting, but comes to love and care about the family.

Stuff Nelson is able to locate his boy. The family tries to talk him out of leaving. The boy finally stands up to Stuff and refuses to leave. Stuff is immediately shot by the police.

== Cast ==
- Edward Arnold as Martin 'Stuff' Nelson
- Lionel Barrymore as 'Grandpop' Logan
- Marsha Hunt as Katherine Logan
- Robert Sterling as Edward 'Ted' McCormick
- Gene Reynolds as Russell 'Roosty' Nelson
- Emma Dunn as 'Ma' McCormick
- Veda Ann Borg as Julie Jackson
- Richard Lane as FBI Agent Craig
- Gloria DeHaven as Anne Logan
- Grant Mitchell as Judge
- Phil Silvers as 'Grapevine' Hobo
- Warren Ashe as Jay
- William Haade as Johnny Van Brook
- Ralph Byrd as FBI Agent Brock
- Edgar Barrier as 'Burnsy' Burns
