= Born to the West =

1937 film

- Original film poster
- Directed by: Charles Barton
- Written by: Stuart Anthony; Robert Yost
- Produced by: William T. Lackey; William LeBaron
- Starring: John Wayne; Marsha Hunt; John Mack Brown; John Patterson; Monte Blue; Lucien Littlefield; Nick Lukats
- Cinematography: Devereaux Jennings
- Edited by: John F. Link Sr.
- Distributed by: Paramount Pictures
- Release date: December 10, 1937
- Running time: 59 minutes
- Country: United States
- Language: English

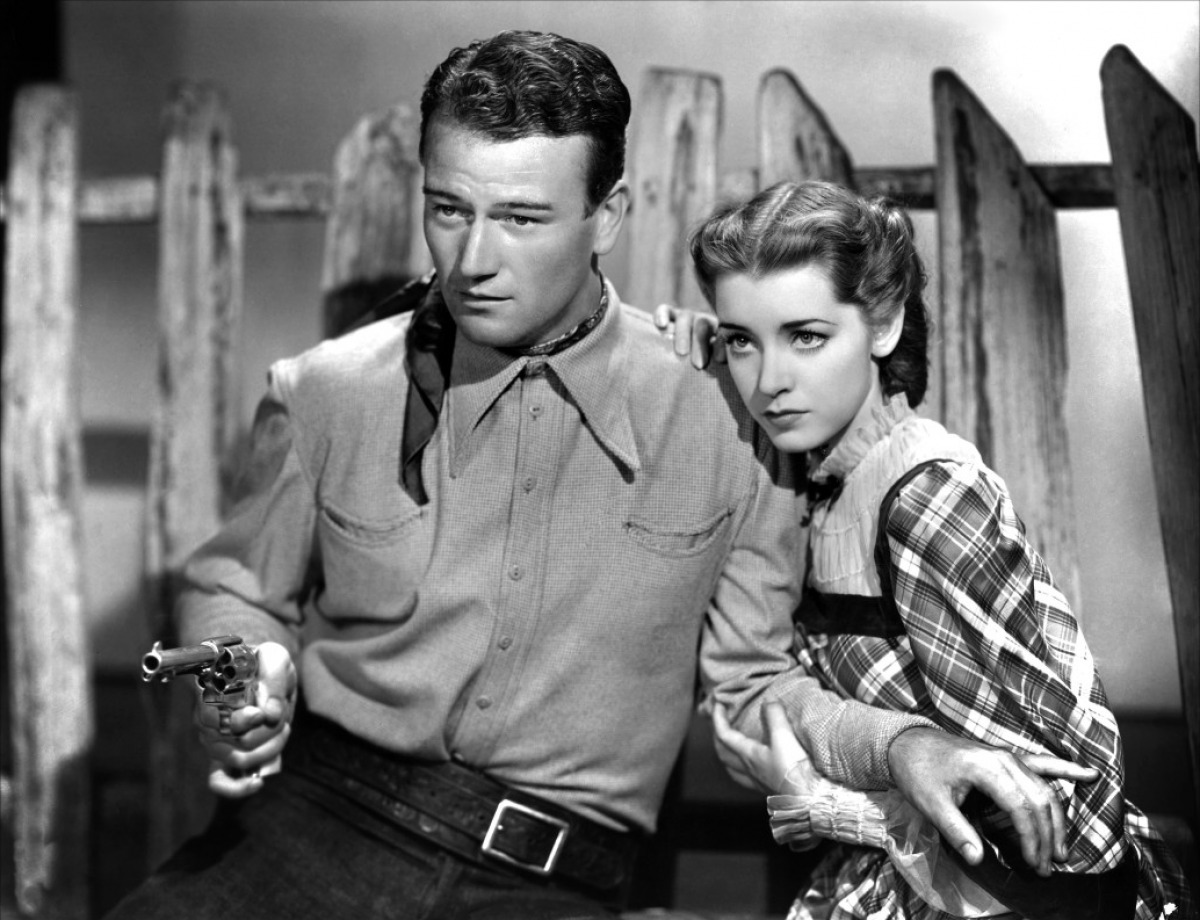
John Wayne and Marsha Hunt in Born to the West (1937)

Born to the West (re-released by Favorite Films in 1950 as Hell Town) is a 1937 American Western film, starring John Wayne, Marsha Hunt and John Mack Brown. Filmed in black and white and based upon a Zane Grey novel, the movie incorporates footage from an earlier and higher budgeted silent version, a common practice of the era. The picture features: fast chases, gun-fights, unusual poker gambling and peppy light dialogue for the love interest.

== Plot ==
On their way to Idaho, Dare Rudd and Dinkey Hooley encounter a fight between rustlers and ranchers, not knowing which is which. They join in, but leave when the sheriff's posse arrives and they find out they have joined the rustlers by mistake. They are followed, caught by one of the posse who turns out to be Rudd's cousin, Tom Fillmore, who Rudd was hoping to visit when they got to Wyoming. Fillmore is a successful and influential rancher and president of the local bank, who thinks Rudd should abandon his carefree lifestyle and settle down.

In town, Rudd, who considers himself a good poker player, and Hooley are thrown out of the casino, after starting a fight with a card cheat. They then visit Fillmore in his bank. Fillmore offers them jobs, but they decline, until Dare sees Fillmore's sweetheart, Judy Worstall, and decides to take the job. Rudd and Hooley visit the casino where the owner, Bart Hammond, leader of the rustlers, is talking to his lead henchman, who is unsure they should keep trying to rustle Fillmore's cattle, as he has a lot of men to help him. The henchman recognizes Rudd and Hooley as the men who, temporarily, helped earlier that day. Thinking they are fellow rustlers, Hammond offers them a job, which they say they might accept if their other job doesn't work out.

When Fillmore and Judy visit the cowhands, where Rudd and Dooley are the cooks, a rattlesnake scares Judy's horse. Rudd and Fillmore chase after her, with Fillmore falling off his horse and Rudd saving Judy. Hammond is planning to rustle Fillmore's cattle on the next drive, with help from Fillmore's foreman, Lynn Hardy. Judy convinces Fillmore to give Rudd a better job, so Fillmore makes him foreman for the drive. When rustlers attack the drive's camp, they fall into a trap, set by Rudd, and are driven off after losing a couple of men. After delivering the cattle, Rudd is pushed by Hammond into playing poker with crooked gambler, Buck Brady. When Rudd is late, Judy is worried, but Fillmore says he more or less expected Rudd to steal the money. Judy convinces him to go and find Rudd.

Fillmore goes to the bar and finds Rudd when he has lost almost all the money from the sale of the cattle. He forces Rudd to swap places at the table and starts winning the money back. When Hammond calls for drinks, Fillmore discovers the bartender has been swapping decks and pulls his gun, demanding everyone get back their original stake. One of Hammond's henchmen shoots Fillmore, wounding him, but Rudd kills the attacker and Fillmore, Rudd and Dooley escape, chased by Hammond and the rustlers.

Rudd and Fillmore hide in some rocks while Dooley tries to catch up with the cowhands. Rudd shoots Hammond, but he and Fillmore are almost out of bullets when Dooley and the cowboys return and kill most of the rustlers.

While Fillmore is recuperating, Rudd and Dooley start off for Montana. Judy catches up to them and tells Rudd that Fillmore wants him to be his partner at the ranch.

== Cast ==
Onscreen credits do not list roles, in order:

- John Wayne as Dare Rudd
- Marsha Hunt as Judy Rustoe
- John Mack Brown as Tom Fillmore
- John Patterson as Lynn Hardy
- Monte Blue as Bart Hammond
- Lucien Littlefield as Cattle Buyer
- Syd Saylor as Dink Hooley (salesman; uncredited)
- Earl Dwire as Cowhand (uncredited)
- James Craig as the Gambler

== See also ==
- List of American films of 1937
- John Wayne filmography
