= Pilot No. 5 =

1943 film by George Sidney

Pilot #5
- Theatrical release poster
- Directed by: George Sidney
- Written by: David Hertz
- Produced by: B.P. Fineman
- Starring: Franchot Tone; Marsha Hunt; Gene Kelly; Van Johnson
- Cinematography: Paul C. Vogel
- Edited by: George White
- Music by: Lennie Hayton
- Distributed by: Metro-Goldwyn-Mayer
- Release date: June 24, 1943
- Running time: 71 minutes
- Country: United States
- Language: English
- Budget: $486,000
- Box office: $969,000

Pilot #5 (a.k.a. Destination Tokyo, Skyway to Glory, and The Story of Number Five) is a 1943 black-and-white World War II propaganda film from Metro-Goldwyn-Mayer, produced by B.P. Fineman, directed by George Sidney, that stars Franchot Tone, Marsha Hunt, Gene Kelly, and Van Johnson. Pilot #5 marked Gene Kelly's dramatic film debut.

== Plot ==
In May 1942, an Allied base on Java is bombed by Japanese aircraft, with another attack expected the next day. With only one working fighter and five American pilots who all volunteer to fly it, Dutch commander Major Eichel chooses George Collins because he has come up with a daring plan: attach a bomb rack to the fighter to bomb the Japanese aircraft carrier from which the attack came. After George takes off, Eichel asks the other pilots to tell him about George. Flashbacks stories of his civilian life before the war are interleaved with radio broadcasts from George.

Four years earlier, George is working his way through law school and is at the top of his class. He takes Freddie Andrews to an empty lot in the country, where he proposes and tells her that he has bought the land to build their home. She accepts.

At first, they are happy, but then his friend and fellow lawyer Vito S. Alessandro invites him to join his law firm after graduation. Vito's firm works for corrupt state governor Hank Durban. Despite Freddie's concerns, George takes the job. He ends up evicting poor farmers to make way for an irrigation project which will mostly benefit Durban and his cronies.

Meanwhile, Vito's brother Nikola arrives from Italy. A member of the resistance to Benito Mussolini's regime, he had been imprisoned, but finally managed to escape. When he sees a portrait of the Italian dictator hanging in Vito's office, he becomes enraged and tears it down. The prison ordeal has taken its toll on Nikola's health, and he commits suicide.

Freddie finally divorces George because, while she still loves him, she does not like him anymore. Eventually, George becomes sickened when a mentally disabled girl dies accidentally during the eviction of her family. He provides information that brings about the downfall of Governor Durban, but the residents of his town ostracize him, unaware of his pivotal role in the downfall. Freddie, however, knows that he has redeemed himself, and they get back together.

Back in the present, George locates the Japanese carrier and dives on it, but the 500-pound bomb fails to release properly. After shooting down a couple of enemy fighters, George makes a fateful decision and deliberately crashes his fighter into the carrier. The explosion rocks the ship and fires spread rapidly. The carrier's battle ensign, now afire, is the last thing seen as it slips beneath the waves.

== Cast ==
- Franchot Tone as George Braynor Collins
- Marsha Hunt as Freddie Andrews
- Gene Kelly as Vito S. Alessandro
- Van Johnson as Everett Arnold
- Alan Baxter as Winston Davis
- Dick Simmons as Henry Willoughby Claven
- Steven Geray as Major Eichel (as Steve Geray)
- Howard Freeman as Governor Hank Durban
- Frank Puglia as Nikola Alessandro
- Sara Haden as Landlady
- William Tannen as American Soldier
- Peter Lawford as a British soldier (Uncredited)

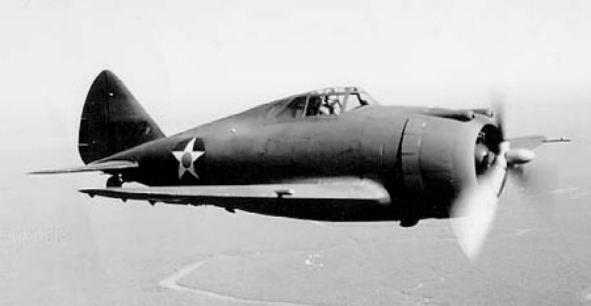
Republic P-43 Lancer fighter

== Production ==
The California facilities at Cal-Aero Aviation Training School (formerly Curtiss-Wright Technical Institute) were used for the wartime sequence. A Republic P-43 Lancer was prominently featured as the sole remaining fighter aircraft in Java.

Although a relatively minor production, a great number of MGM players who later achieved fame were used in the film, but their scenes may have been lost in final editing Studio records and casting call lists indicate Hobart Cavanaugh, Jim Davis, Marilyn Maxwell, Marie Windsor and Frances Rafferty as cast members. Ava Gardner has been listed in a modern source as uncredited.

== Reception ==
Not given any major promotion and considered a "B" feature on the MGM lot, Pilot #5 was mainly considered a forgettable flagwaver, typical of the WWII period. It was not received favorably by audiences or critics. More recent reviews have noted it provides a historical context, but it mainly remains a curio. Leonard Maltin described the film more favorably, "Good cast uplifts so-so curio; it's intriguing to see Kelly in a supporting part, as a morally bankrupt hothead. Watch for Peter Lawford at the opening, and see if you can spot Ava Gardner.

=== Box office ===
According to MGM records, Pilot #5 earned $669,000 in the U.S. and Canada and $300,000 elsewhere resulting in a profit of $174,000.
