= Too Short A Season =

- Star Trek: The Next Generation episode
- The make-up applied to actor Clayton Rohner to age him in the role of Admiral Mark Jameson was later criticised by the director and reviewers.
- Episode no.: Season 1 Episode 16
- Directed by: Rob Bowman
- Story by: Michael Michaelian
- Teleplay by: Michael Michaelian; D. C. Fontana
- Production code: 112
- Original air date: February 8, 1988

Guest appearances
- Clayton Rohner – Adm. Mark Jameson; Marsha Hunt – Anne Jameson; Michael Pataki – Karnas

Episode chronology
← Previous "11001001"	Next → "When the Bough Breaks"
- Star Trek: The Next Generation season 1

"Too Short A Season" is the sixteenth episode of the first season of the American science fiction television series Star Trek: The Next Generation. It first aired on February 8, 1988, in broadcast syndication. The teleplay was written by Michael Michaelian and D. C. Fontana, based on a story by Michaelian, and the episode was directed by Rob Bowman.

Set in the 24th century, the series follows the adventures of the Starfleet crew of the USS Enterprise (NCC-1701-D). In this episode, the Enterprise transports the elderly Admiral Mark Jameson to deal with a hostage negotiation on the planet Mordan IV. Jameson has secretly taken a drug to reverse his aging, and must defuse the situation with a former adversary.

During re-writes of the script by Fontana, various elements introduced by Michaelian were changed, including the ending. Guest stars included Michael Pataki, who had appeared in the original Star Trek series episode "The Trouble with Tribbles". Reviews were mixed, with particular criticism directed at the acting of Clayton Rohner as Admiral Jameson.

== Plot ==
The starship Enterprise, under the command of Captain Jean-Luc Picard (Patrick Stewart), brings aboard the elderly Admiral Mark Jameson and his wife Anne (Marsha Hunt) on request of Karnas (Michael Pataki), the Governor of Mordan IV. Karnas warns that a dissident terrorist group has taken a Federation Ambassador and his staff hostage, and demand to speak to a negotiator. Jameson had negotiated a previous settlement on Mordan IV. As the ship travels to Mordan IV, Jameson becomes stronger and more able to move about on his own, and no longer shows signs of the terminal Iverson's Disease he was known to have before he was beamed aboard. Jameson admits to taking an array of drugs to reverse the aging process over the last two years, and only recently has taken an overdose of the drugs to prepare himself for the negotiations. Jameson begins to appear younger and full of energy, but has frequent pains as a result of the overdose. By the time they are nearing Mordan, Jameson appears as a young adult.

As they approach the planet, Jameson begins audio communication with Karnas to learn more of the situation, and asks Karnas if his old enemies had taken the hostages. Karnas replies they are dead, and that Jameson is coming back to Mordan IV just like he did 45 years before. Jameson realizes that Karnas has never forgiven him and that it is Karnas that has taken the Federation staff. Karnas reminds Jameson that his treachery during their last encounter on Mordan IV resulted in years of war. Against the advice of Picard, Jameson devises plans to rescue the hostages by transporting the away team to the tunnels beneath Karnas' mansion, believing that they are being held in the same place as the previous captives. Picard privately confronts Jameson about Karnas' motives. Jameson reveals that in the past, Karnas captured a Federation starliner in revenge for the death of his father by another local tribe. Jameson was sent in to bargain for their release after two previous Federation negotiators had been killed; Jameson reveals the truth to Picard: he secured the hostages' release not by persuasion, but by granting Karnas' demand for Federation weapons. However, Jameson gave the same weapons to Karnas' enemies, intending to let the two sides settle their dispute on an equal footing. He had expected a short-lived skirmish, not 40 years of civil war, and is now trying to correct his mistake. He took the reverse-aging drug overdose in order to be at his best.

In orbit, the Enterprise crew and Jameson beam down into the tunnels beneath Karnas' manor but find that their arrival was anticipated and face off against armed guards. Jameson collapses during the fight and the crew beams back to the Enterprise. Jameson was not shot, but the reverse aging drug is literally destroying his body. Karnas demands to see Jameson or he will kill a hostage every 15 minutes. Picard opts to beam him, Dr. Crusher (Gates McFadden), Jameson and eventually Jameson's wife Anne directly to Karnas' office. Karnas refuses to believe that the young man is Jameson, so Jameson reveals a scar on his wrist inflicted by Karnas years ago to seal their bargain. Jameson dies shortly afterward in his wife's embrace. Karnas agrees to let the hostages go and to allow Jameson to be buried on Mordan IV at Anne's request.

== Production ==
Writer Michael Michaelian originally pitched a story idea based on andropause, sometimes referred to as "male menopause". He wrote a treatment and first draft script involving reverse aging. D. C. Fontana later explained that the terrorist MacGuffin (an ambiguous but central plot point) was not quite right. Fontana was brought in to overhaul the ending, and explained that a "lot of what I put in at the end was also in Michael's story and drafts, but approached with a different emphasis". One significant alteration she made was to change the plot from involving actual terrorists to a trap that the crew must defuse. The original ending also had the two opposing parties on the planet sit down for peace talks with Jameson surviving the effects of the de-aging drugs. He would have been reduced in age to fourteen and could no longer remember his wife.

Clayton Rohner was cast as Admiral Mark Jameson. Prior to filming, Rohner and director Rob Bowman worked together on weekends on the characterisation of Jameson. Bowman criticized the style of the script, describing it as "sit-and-tell". He also had a variety of problems with the wheelchair used in this episode which cost $10,000 to construct. It was referred to by prop designer Joe Longo as the "big albatross", and when a wheelchair was required for the Deep Space Nine episode "Melora" they instead created a much simpler version. Karnas was played by Michael Pataki, who had previously portrayed the Klingon Korax in the original Star Trek series episode "The Trouble with Tribbles".

Make-up supervisor Michael Westmore had previously used makeup to age DeForest Kelley in the season premiere "Encounter at Farpoint", but "Too Short A Season" proved a unique challenge as four stages of make-up were required to show Admiral Jameson de-aging. The initial stage to show Jameson at his oldest, involved Rohner wearing a bald-cap and wig plus latex prosthetics applied to his eyes, forehead, throat and jowls. That stage took up to four hours to apply to the actor. Westmore found himself worn out by the volume of work during this episode, as at the time the make-up team on the series included just him and Werner Keppler. On the second day of shooting the first stage make-up, Westmore arrived after Rohner had been in make-up for three hours only to find that he was only half finished. Keppler and Westmore rushed to get him so as not to delay the filming of the episode. Bowman later criticised the make-up used on Rohner, describing it as sub-par. Westmore said that "if I was working on a film, and had several months to test Clayton's make-up beforehand, it probably would have turned out more to my liking. With less than a week to work with, I don't think it turned out too badly."

"Too Short A Season" marked the last time a cityscape would be built as a model for the show until the sixth-season episode "Birthright". They were instead replaced with matte paintings. Phasers from the original Star Trek series and movies, along with a staff from "The Last Outpost" were used to decorate Karnas' office.

== Reception ==
"Too Short A Season" aired in broadcast syndication during the week commencing February 14, 1988. It received Nielsen ratings of 10.9, reflecting the percentage of all households watching the episode during its timeslot. This was the highest ratings received by the series since "The Big Goodbye" four episodes earlier.

=== Critical response ===
Several reviewers re-watched the episode after the end of the series. Keith DeCandido reviewed the episode for Tor.com in June 2011. He said that while the character of Jameson and the history of Mordan IV are interesting, the episode is so focused on Jameson that ultimately "it’s not really a Next Generation episode." He described the return of Michael Pataki to Star Trek as "triumphant" but thought Clayton Rohner was "simply horrible", and that Marsha Hunt "creates no impression whatsoever". He summed up the episode as "a missed opportunity", and gave it a score of 5/10. James Hunt watched the episode in January 2013 for the website Den of Geek. He felt that the episode had a good story at the core but highlighted the "rather dubious make-up and over-acting". His main criticism was that Jameson "is fundamentally unlikeable", and the lack of involvement of the show's main cast.

Zack Handlen watched the episode for The A.V. Club in May 2010, and also found that the episode's interesting concept was undermined by the character of Jameson being "thoroughly unlikable". He described Rohner as "acting like a Muppet when he's supposed to be elderly and weak, then laying on the over-heated angst once his youth is restored". He felt that the main characters were sidelined in the episode, and so it was difficult to be involved in what went on. He gave the episode a grade of C+. Michelle Erica Green reviewed the episode for TrekNation in June 2007. She found fault with the episode for failing to explore the consequences of the discovery of a functional de-aging formula. She too criticised the makeup used on Rohner, but said that in the scenes for which he wore no makeup his acting became more "modulated, but then both Karnas and the actor playing him seem over-the-top by comparison".

== Home media release ==
The first home media release of "Too Short A Season" was on VHS cassette, appearing on July 1, 1992, in the United States and Canada. The episode was later included on the Star Trek: The Next Generation season one DVD box set, released in March 2002, and then released as part of the season one Blu-ray set on July 24, 2012.
