= None Shall Escape =

1944 film by André de Toth

- Original US 1944 poster
- Directed by: Andre de Toth
- Screenplay by: Lester Cole
- Story by: Alfred Neumann; Joseph Than
- Produced by: Samuel Bischoff
- Starring: Marsha Hunt; Alexander Knox; Henry Travers
- Cinematography: Lee Garmes
- Edited by: Charles Nelson
- Music by: Ernst Toch
- Color process: Black and white
- Production company: Columbia Pictures
- Distributed by: Columbia Pictures
- Release date: February 3, 1944
- Running time: 86 minutes
- Country: United States
- Language: English

None Shall Escape is a 1944 war film. Even though the film was made during World War II, the setting is a post-war Nuremberg-style war crimes trial. Alexander Knox plays Wilhelm Grimm, a Nazi officer who is on trial, and the story unfolds through the eyes of several witnesses, including a Catholic priest, Father Warecki (Henry Travers), Grimm's brother Karl (Erik Rolf) and Marja Pacierkowski (Marsha Hunt), a woman to whom he was once engaged.

Alfred Neumann and Joseph Than were nominated for an Academy Award for Best Story.

== Plot ==
The film takes place in "the future" after the unconditional surrender of Nazi Germany, and centers on the trial of Wilhelm Grimm, a war criminal. Each character witness provides a flashback scene to a previous part of Grimm's life. In the trial, it is revealed that Grimm (Alexander Knox), who fought for Germany in World War I and lost a leg in battle, returns after the war to the small German village of Lidzbark (now part of Poland) where he had been a teacher. Despite the recent hostilities, he is welcomed back into the community and resumes his teaching. He also resumes his relationship with Marja Pacierkowski, a local Polish girl to whom he had become engaged before the war.

He is bitter about Germany's losing the war and it is obvious he has been changed by the experience. He treats the villagers with disdain, and Marja decides to postpone their upcoming marriage. Grimm then calls his fiancée a "peasant" only interested in her wedding dowry.

Grimm is taunted by the school's pupils, who say behind his back that he is not fit to marry any Polish woman. He eventually molests a pupil, Anna, who was one of the few to show him sympathy. The rape is blamed on her young male friend, Jan Stys, but Marja accidentally stumbles on the truth from Anna. The girl subsequently drowns herself in the lake. A mob gathers seeking vengeance, but a trial is required. Nevertheless, Jan throws a stone, putting out Wilhelm's left eye. After the trial fails to convict him, Wilhelm returns to Germany, after borrowing money from the priest and the rabbi.

In Germany he goes to Munich to the house of his brother Karl, who is married with a young family. Karl clearly despises the Nazis, referring scornfully to "that Hitler creature". Karl cannot dissuade Wilhelm, though, and Wilhelm joins the Nazi Party and rises through its ranks. In 1929 he is sought by the police after the Nazi Party is made illegal. Karl's son, Willie, keeps the police at bay and Wilhelm rewards him with a swastika badge. As the Nazis grow in strength, Karl decides he has no option but to leave Germany and go to Vienna. He threatens to reveal Wilhelm's part in the Reichstag fire unless he joins them but, instead of doing so, Wilhelm turns them over to the authorities, sending his own brother to a concentration camp. He then arranges that Willie enters the Hitler Youth.

When World War II starts, Grimm becomes the commander of the occupying force of the same village where he had previously lived. He treats the villagers brutally. He forces Marja, now a schoolteacher, to burn the children's books, saying they will be replaced by German books. He cruelly says that time has not treated her well and taunts her for rejecting him due to his leg injury. His nephew Willie, whom Wilhelm asserts that he treats as his own son, is now serving under him and pursuing Marja's daughter, Janina.

Grimm, who is now a Reich Commissioner, next becomes involved in the large-scale deportation of the Jews and other minority groups. He commands the rabbi to quell dissent among the crowd as they are being placed on a train. The rabbi, knowing that they are going to die, instructs the crowd to rebel instead, upon which the Nazis turn machine guns onto the crowd. Wilhelm kills the rabbi with his pistol. Father Warecki exchanges final words with him as he dies.

Willie finds Marja and Janina hiding Jan Stys, who is injured, but he leaves without Jan when Marja rebukes him, and seems to soften in his attitude. Wilhelm sends Janina to work at the "officers' club," the Nazi name for enforced prostitution. Willie begs that she be released, to no avail. When Janina also dies, Grimm's nephew renounces his Nazi allegiance, having realized what an evil path Wilhelm has led him on. While Willie is praying by the side of Janina's body in the church, Wilhelm shoots him in the back.

We return to the courtroom. Wilhelm refuses to accept the authority of the court and continues to spout Nazi propaganda. The judge leaves it to the people to decide Grimm's fate and, in an apparent fourth wall break, explains to the camera how the United Nations will have to judge war criminals.

== Cast ==
- Marsha Hunt as Marja Pacierkowski, Grimm's fiancée
- Alexander Knox as Wilhelm Grimm
- Henry Travers as Father Warecki, the village priest in Litzbark
- Erik Rolf as Karl Grimm
- Richard Crane as Willie as a young man
- Dorothy Morris as Janina
- Richard Hale as Rabbi David Levin
- Ruth Nelson as Alice Grimm
- Kurt Kreuger as Lt. Gersdorf
- Billy Dawson as Willie, Wilhelm's young nephew
- Trevor Bardette as Jan Stys as a man (uncredited)
- Elvin Field as the young Jan Stys (uncredited)
- Frank Jaquet as Dr Matek, mayor of Lizbark (uncredited)
- Shirley Mills as Anna Oremska, the raped girl (uncredited)
- Art Smith as Jan's father (uncredited)
- Ray Teal as Oremski, Anna's father (uncredited)

== Production ==
Columbia Pictures' in-house producer Sam Bischoff got the idea to make a film about a war crime trial after having heard President Franklin D. Roosevelt declare on August 21, 1942 that the Allies were collecting information about the Nazi leaders responsible for war atrocities, in order to bring them to court after the war. (The prosecution of war criminals was ratified by the Allies in the Moscow Declarations in 1943). He brought on his former partner Burt Kelly to associate produce, who suggested The House of the Seven Gables screenwriter Lester Cole to adapt the original story by Joseph Than and Alfred Neumann. During production it was known as both "The Day Will Come" and "Lebensraum". To ensure the film be exhibited it had to conform to the usual Production Code Administration (PCA) for morality and be submitted for review with the U.S. State Department's Office of Information (OWI) for wartime values. The PCA passed the film and the OWI gave it an enthusiastic greenlight stating:

“By projecting the pledges made by President Roosevelt, Winston Churchill, and other United Nations leaders, that those guilty of atrocities and violations of international law will be tried and punished, new hope could be given to the peoples of those countries now occupied by Axis forces. [...] The first picture dealing with the punishment of Nazi war criminals to be made in Hollywood, None Shall Escape has emerged as a thoughtful and intelligent examination of this important postwar problem.”

The film wanted to represent the Tribunal of the Warsaw District accurately during all stages as it was some of the first ever seen of humanity held accountable for its acts.

Production began August 31, 1943 and finished October 26, 1943 (i.e. more than eighteen months before the war in Europe ended.) Director Andre de Toth had seen the war up close already in 1939. He was filming newsreels in Hungary when the Germans invaded Poland on September 1, 1939, and was immediately sent to cover the fighting on the German-Polish front.

== Reception ==
Alfred Neumann and Joseph Than were nominated for an Academy Award for Best Story, and the film is considered to be the first feature film to deal with Nazi atrocities against the Jews.
