= Easy to Take =

1936 film by Glenn Tryon

- Directed by: Glenn Tryon
- Screenplay by: Virginia Van Upp
- Story by: Wayne Kolbourne
- Produced by: Jack Cunningham
- Starring: Marsha Hunt; John Howard; Eugene Pallette; Richard Carle; Douglas Scott; Robert Greig
- Cinematography: George Robinson
- Edited by: Edward Dmytryk
- Music by: Gregory Stone
- Production company: Paramount Pictures
- Distributed by: Paramount Pictures
- Release date: November 6, 1936
- Running time: 67 minutes
- Country: United States
- Language: English

Easy to Take is a 1936 American comedy film directed by Glenn Tryon and written by Virginia Van Upp. The film stars Marsha Hunt, John Howard, Eugene Pallette, Richard Carle, Douglas Scott and Robert Greig. The film was released on November 6, 1936, by Paramount Pictures.

== Cast ==
- Marsha Hunt as Donna Westlake
- John Howard as Rodney Garfield
- Eugene Pallette as Dr. Reginald Kraft aka Doc
- Richard Carle as Attorney Olney
- Douglas Scott as Wilbur Wentworth Westlake
- Robert Greig as Judd
- Jan Duggan as Miss Higgie
- Marilyn Knowlden as Gwen Ferry
- Josephine Whittell as Mrs. Ferry
- Carl Switzer as Alfred Bottle
- Charles Lane as Skip
- Billy Lee as Bill Ardmore Jr.
