= Murder Goes to College =

1937 film by Charles Reisner

- Directed by: Charles Reisner
- Screenplay by: Brian Marlow; Eddie Welch; Robert Wyler
- Produced by: William T. Lackey
- Starring: Roscoe Karns; Marsha Hunt; Lynne Overman; Buster Crabbe; Astrid Allwyn; Harvey Stephens
- Cinematography: Henry Sharp
- Edited by: Edward Dmytryk
- Music by: Charles Kisco
- Production company: Paramount Pictures
- Distributed by: Paramount Pictures
- Release date: February 24, 1937
- Running time: 77 minutes
- Country: United States
- Language: English

Murder Goes to College is a 1937 American comedy mystery film directed by Charles Reisner and written by Brian Marlow, Eddie Welch and Robert Wyler. The film stars Roscoe Karns, Marsha Hunt, Lynne Overman, Buster Crabbe, Astrid Allwyn and Harvey Stephens. The film was released on February 24, 1937, by Paramount Pictures.

Karns' and Overman's private-eye characters were reteamed for a sequel, Partners in Crime, later that year.

== Plot ==
In a large university, a policy-racket scheme intertwines with the world of applied mathematics, involving both the academic elite and the criminal underworld. The plot thickens when a professor named Tom Barry is murdered in the Dean's office. It is revealed that Barry had developed a system to help gangster Strike Belno beat the numbers-racket, only to betray him and become a prime suspect in his murder. Greta Barry, Tom's wife, is torn between her love for Belno and the romantic advances of another professor. Meanwhile, Nora Barry, Tom's sister, is furious and her fiancé appears suspicious.

== Cast ==
- Roscoe Karns as Sim Perkins
- Marsha Hunt as Nora Barry
- Lynne Overman as Henry 'Hank' Hyer
- Buster Crabbe as Strike Belno
- Astrid Allwyn as Greta Barry
- Harvey Stephens as Paul Broderick
- Purnell Pratt as President Arthur L. McShean
- Barlowe Borland as Dean Wilfred Everett Olney
- Earle Foxe as Tom Barry
- Anthony Nace as Howard Sayforth
- Ellen Drew as Lil
- Nick Lukats as Drunk
- Jack Chapin as Taxi Driver
- Charles C. Wilson as Inspector Simpson
