= Kid Glove Killer =

1942 film by Fred Zinnemann

- Directed by: Fred Zinnemann
- Screenplay by: Allen Rivkin; John C. Higgins
- Story by: John C. Higgins
- Produced by: Jack Chertok
- Starring: Van Heflin; Marsha Hunt; Lee Bowman; Samuel S. Hinds
- Cinematography: Paul C. Vogel
- Edited by: Ralph E. Winters
- Music by: David Snell; Daniele Amfitheatrof; Lennie Hayton
- Distributed by: Metro-Goldwyn-Mayer
- Release date: April 1942
- Running time: 74 minutes
- Country: United States
- Language: English
- Budget: $199,000
- Box office: $550,000 (initial release)

Kid Glove Killer is a 1942 American crime film, starring Van Heflin as a forensic scientist investigating the murder of a mayor. The B film, the feature-length directorial debut of Fred Zinnemann, was an expanded version of the 1938 Crime Does Not Pay short subject "They're Always Caught".

== Plot ==
Ambitious young attorney Gerald I. Latimer (Lee Bowman) helps mayoral candidate Daniels (Samuel S. Hinds) and district attorney candidate Turnely to be elected; the pair had vowed to rid the city of its pernicious criminal rackets. The two elected officials are unaware that Gerald has paired up with one of the city's biggest gangsters, Matty (John Litel), to get help in getting Gerald elected to the U.S. Senate in exchange for future political favors.

Gerald warns Matty that Turnely and Daniels are serious about cracking down on crime, so Matty has Turnely murdered. Gerald is appointed special prosecutor, and gets to meet the crew that investigates the district attorney's murder. His good friend, forensic scientist Gordon McKay (Van Heflin), and his assistant, Jane Mitchell (Marsha Hunt), examine the body and determine the identity of the hit man, who dies while trying to avoid capture.

Gerald makes a public show of arresting crime figures, but people like restaurateur Eddie Wright (Eddie Quillan), long-harassed by the racketeers, realize that only small-time operators are being arrested. Eddie believes the mayor is sincere and, knowing that some of the police are corrupt, decides to speak directly the mayor about what needs to be done. Eddie goes to the mayor's house and waits for him, but his presence alarms the mayor's wife and she calls the police on him. They take note of his presence and send him home.

Meanwhile, the mayor questions Gerald about a large insurance policy he bought, wanting to know where the money came from. When Gerald refuses to answer, the mayor declares his intention to begin an investigation into the source of Gerald's funds. Knowing that his dealings with the gangsters will be uncovered, Gerald appeals to Matty, but Matty insists that Gerald take care of the mayor himself. Gerald places a bomb in the mayor's car, and the mayor dies when the bomb goes off.

The police suspect Eddie of having placed the bomb, and detain him. Some circumstantial evidence points to Eddie but Gordon is skeptical and continues the investigation although Gerald calls for Eddie's arrest.

Gerald spends a lot of time in the police crime lab and eventually falls in love with Jane. He even asks her hand in marriage, but she rejects him, explaining she can't marry and quit her job until the double homicide investigation is finished. When she tells him Gordon has concluded that the man planting the bomb should have gunpowder under his nails, Gerald rushes off to scrub his hands meticulously, successfully avoiding having suspicion fall upon him.

Later, Gordon later finds a note in the mayor's office implicating Gerald. This time, he does not mention his finding to Jane and instead surreptitiously obtains a hair sample from him. After analyzing the sample, Gordon tells Jane he has found the killer, but he won't reveal his name. When Jane and Gerald meet again and she agrees to marry him, she tells Gerald that Gordon has found the killer through a hair sample. Gerald realizes he has to kill his friend Gordon.

Gerald sets up a meeting with Gordon and Matty, and gives his car keys to Jane so she can drive herself home. She sees the cigar cutter on the key ring and realizes it could have been used to cut bomb wires. She takes it to the crime lab for examination.

Gerald gets a gun from Matty, who shows him how to use it. He rushes to the crime lab to kill Gordon. When he enters Gordon's office he asks him to hand over the evidence incriminating him, and Jane overhears the shouting from the lab. Gerald is confessing the killings to Gordon when Jane enters the office. Gordon overpowers Gerald and gets the gun. The police arrive at the scene shortly after, and both Gerald and Matty are arrested.

Gordon realizes that he is in love with Jane and proposes to her. She willingly accepts.

== Cast ==
- Van Heflin as Gordon McKay
- Marsha Hunt as Jane Mitchell
- Lee Bowman as Gerald I. Ladimer
- Samuel S. Hinds as Mayor Daniels
- Cliff Clark as Captain Lynch
- Eddie Quillan as Eddie Wright
- John Litel as Matty
- Cathy Lewis as Bessie Wright
- Nella Walker as Mrs. Daniels
- Jeff York as Henchman (uncredited)
- Ava Gardner as Carhop (uncredited)
- Paul Fix as Allison Stacy (uncredited)

== Reception ==
The film earned $336,000 in the US and Canada and $214,000 elsewhere during its initial theatrical run, making MGM a profit of $161,000.
