= Cry 'Havoc' (film) =

1943 film by Richard Thorpe

- theatrical release poster
- Directed by: Richard Thorpe
- Screenplay by: Paul Osborn; Jane Murfin (uncredited)
- Based on: Cry Havoc; 1942 play by Allan R. Kenward
- Produced by: Edwin Knopf
- Starring: Margaret Sullavan; Ann Sothern; Joan Blondell
- Cinematography: Karl Freund; Hal Rosher (uncredited)
- Edited by: Ralph E. Winters
- Music by: Daniele Amfitheatrof
- Production company: Metro-Goldwyn-Mayer
- Distributed by: Loew's Inc.
- Release dates: November 23, 1943 (NYC); February 1944 (US)
- Running time: 97-98 minutes
- Country: United States
- Language: English

Cry 'Havoc' is a 1943 American war drama film, produced by Metro-Goldwyn-Mayer and directed by Richard Thorpe. It stars Margaret Sullavan, Ann Sothern and Joan Blondell, and features Fay Bainter, Marsha Hunt, Ella Raines, Frances Gifford, Diana Lewis, Heather Angel, Dorothy Morris and Connie Gilchrist.

== Plot ==
This is the story of thirteen women. Only two of them—Captain Alice Marsh and Lieutenant Mary Smith—were members of the armed forces of the United States. The others were civilians—American women who, until that fateful day in December, knew no more of war than did you or your nearest neighbor.

Two Army nurses work in a military field hospital during the Battle of Bataan in the early months of United States involvement in World War II. Head nurse Lieutenant Mary “Smitty” Smith and her superior, Captain Alice Marsh, recognize a desperate need for nurses and supplies such as quinine, as men are surviving surgery only to die of malaria. Marsh plans to look for volunteers among the thousands of refugees escaping Manila. Smith is suffering from malaria, and Marsh insists she join the evacuation to Corregidor, for patriation to Australia where new medicines can save her.

Nurse Flo Norris returns from Mariveles with supplies and nine civilian refugees who are put to work. They are slow to adjust to the constant fire and close quarters, and Pat Conlin rebels against Smith's oversight, admitting she's always hated taking orders from other women. Pat becomes infatuated with Lieutenant Holt, who Norris claims is already involved with Smitty. The jealousy between the two women escalates when Smitty must constantly reprimand Pat for ignoring regulations and doing dangerous things such as lighting cigarettes outside at night. The women learn to master their fear and overcome the many challenges of tending the wounded, surviving on a diet of horse, mule and monkey meat, and enduring a stream of dying patients.

Sue West disappears during an air raid and is found by her sister Andra four days later trapped in a shelter with six dead bodies, in a state of shock. The experience helps the women bond and they discuss their futures. Grace, a former burlesque performer, dances for the group to break the tension until her leg is injured during an enemy attack. Overcome by stress, she throws Pat's relationship with Holt in Smitty's face.

When Smitty tells the women that the volunteers are free to leave for the safety of Corregidor, they refuse to leave and remain in Bataan with the military nurses. Six weeks later, Japanese artillery is worsening and the women learn that MacArthur has escaped for Australia. Connie is killed when a Japanese plane strafes them during a swimming party. Smitty admits to Flo that she married Holt before the Japanese invasion and joined the military to be with him, keeping it secret because of military rules against officers and nurses marrying.

Evacuation is underway, the lines are cut, and artillery fire stops. When the Pat learns that Lt. Holt has been killed, she is miserable. Smitty, who doesn't know about Holt, asks if Pat can't take it, and Diana tells Smitty that Pat's boyfriend, Lt. Holt, has just been killed. Smitty, struggling for control, goes into his office, looks around, takes out the ring she wears around her neck on a chain and tries it on.

Back in the barracks, Pat admits that she never had a chance with Holt. He never even made a pass at her. She wonders aloud, he couldn't possibly be fond of Smitty, could he? Flo tells Pat that they were in fact married and that Smitty has malignant malaria, which will kill her. She sacrificed herself to stay close to her husband. Pat asks, Why didn't she say something? It is clear that Pat would not come between husband and wife. There are sounds of sniper fire, then tanks, then machine guns. A Japanese soldier tells the women to come out with their hands over their heads. As they leave their underground barracks, Pat hands Smitty the nearly empty bottle of quinine. Smitty apologizes to Pat for not telling her about Holt, and Pat admits that he never gave her a tumble. They walk out together.

== Cast ==
- Margaret Sullavan as Lieutenant Smith
- Ann Sothern as Pat
- Joan Blondell as Grace
- Fay Bainter as Captain Marsh
- Marsha Hunt as Flo Norris
- Ella Raines as Connie
- Frances Gifford as Helen
- Diana Lewis as Nydia
- Heather Angel as Andra
- Dorothy Morris as Sue
- Connie Gilchrist as Sadie
- Gloria Grafton as Steve
- Fely Franquelli as Luisita
- Anna Q. Nilsson Nurse
- Richard Derr Marine with thermometer
- William Bishop Soldier
- Jack Randall Lt. Thomas Holt
- Robert Mitchum Dying soldier who says "I'm all right"
- Richard Crane Soldier
- James Warren Wounded soldier at the side of the truck

Cast notes:

- The film features a very early appearance by Robert Mitchum, who is briefly seen as a dying soldier. It also marks the final performance by Diana Lewis, who retired following her marriage to William Powell.
- Gloria Grafton made her screen debut in this film.

== Background ==
The film is based on a play by Allan R. Kenward which opened in Hollywood, California in September 1942. The play was also presented on Broadway, under the title Proof Thro' the Night with Carol Channing, Florence Rice and Ann Shoemaker. However, the play was not successful, opening on December 25, 1942 and closing January 2, 1943 after 11 performances. The title comes from a famous line in Shakespeare's Julius Caesar: "Cry 'Havoc!', and let slip the dogs of war."

== Production ==
Allan R. Kenward's play opened in a small Hollywood theatre in September 1942 under the title Cry 'Havoc', and two weeks later, in October 1942, MGM bought the rights to it for $20,000. Broadway producer Lee Shubert received a waiver from the Dramatists Guild to produce the play on Broadway: normally, this could not have happened until one year after a movie of the play had been released. The waiver was granted due to the subject's timeliness, and the show opened on Broadway on December 25, 1942 under the title Proof Thro' the Night. The title was changed back to Cry 'Havoc', possibly because the production did not receive good reviews. MGM paid an additional $15,000 for the rights to the Broadway production.

Mervyn LeRoy was originally slated to direct the film, as he was also scheduled to film the Broadway production as a reference, but it is unclear if this ever happened. LeRoy was replaced by Richard Thorpe in April 1943.

A large number of actresses were considered for the roles in the film. Joan Crawford was announced to play "Smitty", then was changed to play "Pat" against Merle Oberon playing "Smitty". Actresses considered for various roles between December 1942 and May 1943 include June Allyson, Eve Arden, Mary Elliott, Bonita Granville, Laura La Plante, Diana Lynn, Marilyn Maxwell, Kay Medford, June Millarde, Susan Peters, Frances Rafferty, Donna Reed, Helene Reynolds, Ann Sheridan, Mary Treen, Lana Turner, Elena Verdugo, and Tsing, a Chinese ingenue.

Cry 'Havoc' was in productions from May 13 to June 30, 1943, with additional scenes shot from July 18–20 and from September 16 to late September 1943. Location shooting took place in Pico, California.

The film's Technical director, Col. Milton A. Hill, was General Douglas MacArthur's Inspector General, and was on the last submarine to leave Corregidor.

== Response ==
The film was considered topical, with Bataan often in the news at the time, and proved to be profitable. The film writer, John Douglas Eames, commented that much of the film was theatrical rather than cinematic, and he also noted that "some of the girls seemed to have found a beauty salon on Bataan". In The Nation in 1943, critic James Agee wrote, "Cry Havoc is a sincere fourth-rate picture made from a sincere fifth-rate play about nurses on Bataan. ... In fact, in spite of many very bad things in it and its intrinsic staginess, I was often touched by it, simply because the members of the cast (Margaret Sullavan, Ann Sothern, Joan Blondell, Ella Raines, and several others) seemed to care a great deal about the thing they were reenacting." Leonard Maltin also noted that its stage origins were obvious, but that it offered a "pretty honest picture of war".
