= The Happy Time =

1952 film by Richard Fleischer

- Theatrical release poster
- Directed by: Richard Fleischer
- Screenplay by: Earl Felton
- Based on: The Happy Time by Samuel A. Taylor; The Happy Time by Robert Fontaine
- Produced by: Earl Felton
- Starring: Charles Boyer; Louis Jourdan; Marsha Hunt; Kurt Kasznar; Linda Christian; Marcel Dalio; Richard Erdman; Bobby Driscoll
- Cinematography: Charles Lawton Jr.
- Edited by: William A. Lyon
- Music by: Dimitri Tiomkin
- Production company: Stanley Kramer Productions
- Distributed by: Columbia Pictures
- Release date: October 30, 1952 (New York)
- Running time: 94 minutes
- Country: United States
- Language: English

The Happy Time is a 1952 American comedy film directed by Richard Fleischer and starring Charles Boyer and Louis Jourdan.

The script is based on the 1945 novel of the same name by Robert Fontaine that Samuel A. Taylor had adapted for the stage. In 1967, the play was adapted as a Broadway musical by composer John Kander, lyricist Fred Ebb and librettist N. Richard Nash, with Robert Goulet as the star.

== Plot ==
Young Robert "Bibi" Bonnard is raised in Ottawa, Ontario with his parents, Jacques and Susan, and his grandfather, Grandpère. Across the street is his uncle, amiable drunkard Louis, who ignores the complaints of his hard-working dressmaker wife Felice and her worries about the future of their daughter Yvonne. Louis is anxious about meeting his prospective son-in-law, Alfred Grattin, a teetotaler bank clerk. Next-door neighbor and schoolmate Peggy O'Hare has a crush on Bibi, but he is too young to understand.

On his birthday, Bibi is taken to see the vaudeville acts at the theater where his violinist-conductor father works. During the magic act, the Great Gaspari tries to steal a kiss from his assistant Mignonette Chappuis, but she storms offstage and quits. Jacques offers her a job as a maid, which she gladly accepts. Bibi is intrigued but a bit confused about having her as a maid. Uncle Desmonde, a traveling salesman and notorious ladies' man, has been summoned to take the place of a recently deceased sales manager.

Desmonde begins courting Mignonette, but although she is attracted to him, she tells him that she is tired of life on the road. He shows her the picture of a lovely house that he expects to inherit, weakening her resistance.

Peggy becomes jealous of Bibi's attentions to Mignonette. When the school principal Mr. Frye finds a dirty picture, Peggy falsely claims that she saw Bibi draw it. Bibi denies her allegation, angering Frye. He whacks Bibi on the hand three times and tells him that it will be repeated every day until he confesses. The Bonnards are upset and confront Frye, convincing him to relent.

Desmonde discovers that Mignonette has quit after learning that he had lied about the house. She had assumed that it was he who had been sneaking into her bedroom and stealing kisses while she was asleep. Bibi confesses that he is the guilty party. Desmonde realizes that Mignonette is not like all of his other women, and he finds her and they become engaged.

The adults explain Peggy's behavior to Bibi. To Peggy's delight, Bibi forgives her and makes her his girl, but then his voice breaks.

== Cast ==
- Charles Boyer as Jacques Bonnard
- Louis Jourdan as Uncle Desmonde Bonnard
- Marsha Hunt as Susan Bonnard
- Kurt Kasznar as Uncle Louis Bonnard
- Linda Christian as Mignonette Chappuis
- Marcel Dalio as Grandpere Bonnard
- Jeanette Nolan as Felice Bonnard
- Jack Raine as Mr. Frye
- Richard Erdman as Alfred Grattin
- Marlene Cameron as Peggy O'Hare
- Gene Collins as Jimmy Bishop
- Bobby Driscoll as Robert "Bibi" Bonnard

== Production ==
Richard Fleischer had previously worked with Stanley Kramer and Carl Foreman on So This Is New York (1948). They borrowed Fleischer from RKO Radio Pictures after he completed reshoots on His Kind of Woman (1951). Fleischer brought his regular writer, Earl Felton, to the project.

Fleischer later said that Kurt Kasznar wanted too much money to reprise his Broadway performance, so he and Kramer cast Zero Mostel instead. However, when Harry Cohn became aware of the casting, he overruled them, as Mostel was suspected of communist sympathies.

== Reception ==
In a contemporary review for The New York Times, critic Bosley Crowther wrote: "[T]he motions are a trifle too expansive and the tones are a decibel too loud. When the maid holds the hand of the youngster in the movies, he gulps and pops his eyes too much. When the father and uncles go to call on the principal at the boy's school, they put on too many airs. And when Marcel Dalio, as the grandfather, goes out to spark the old girls, he does it as though he were walking right over to enter an Abbott and Costello film. ... It is not that 'The Happy Time' is lacking in a couple of good solid laughs and a number of pleasant chuckles. It is just that it's not the tender film—the mellow and understanding picture—of a boy's growing up as it could be."
