= Carolyne Barry =

American dancer

Carolyne H. Barry (a.k.a. Carol Shelyne)
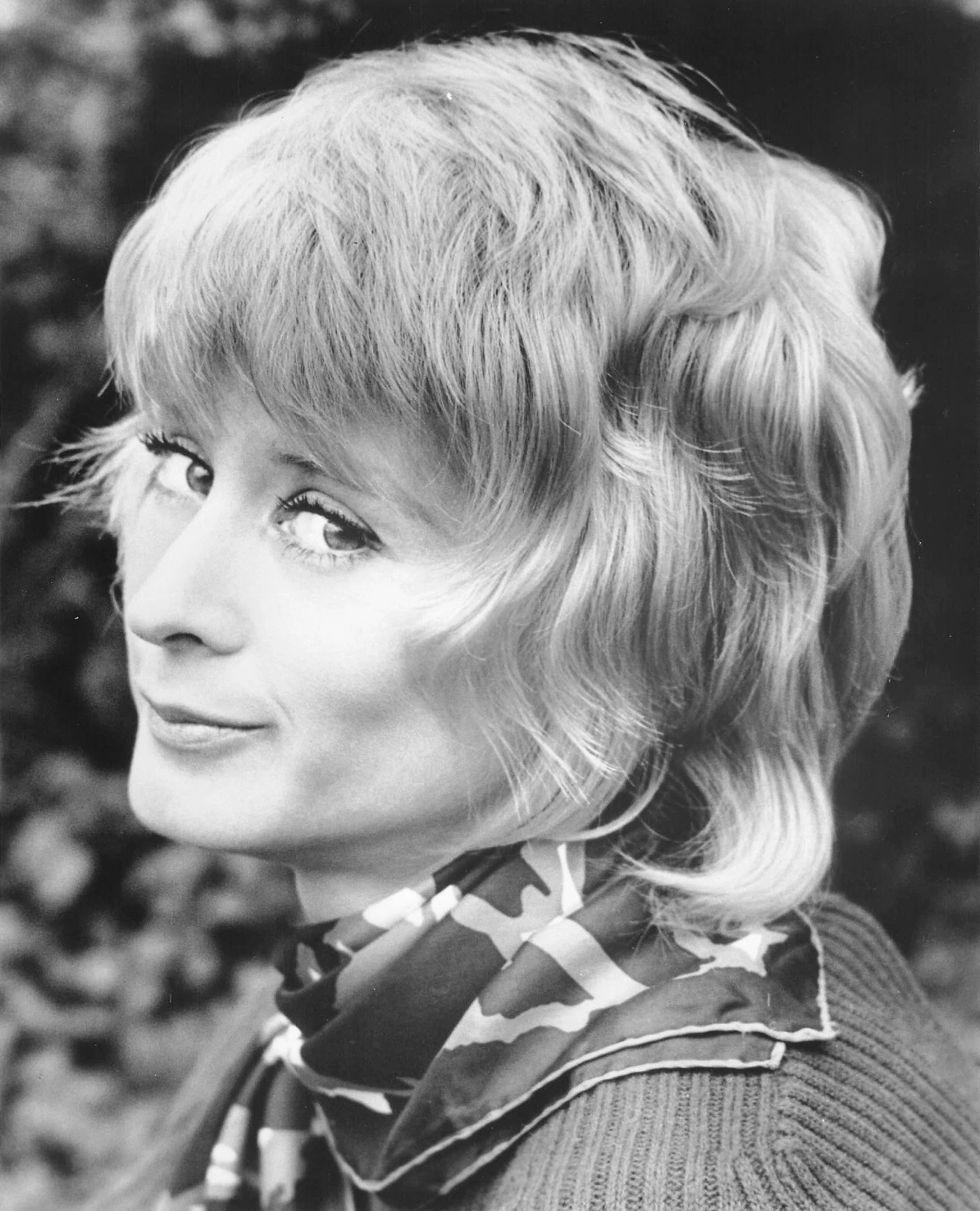
- Barry in 1965
- Born: Carole Stuppler; July 20, 1943
- Died: June 15, 2015 (aged 71)

Carolyne H. Barry (born Carole Stuppler; July 20, 1943 – June 16, 2015) was an American dancer and dance instructor.

Barry was born in Brooklyn, New York. The oldest of four children, she attended UCLA with a dance major and theatre arts minor. She was on the board of the UCLA Theatre Arts Alumni, a member of the Academy of Television Arts & Sciences, and a founder/director of Entertainment Industry Educators.

== Dancer ==
Barry started dancing while still a child, and she attended George Washington Preparatory High School and then El Camino College. After years of training, Barry started her dance career at age 19 at the Melodyland Summer Stock Theatre in Anaheim, California. She went on to be a featured dancer, for two years, as the "girl with the horn-rimmed glasses” on the television show Shindig!. For this show she recorded the hit record “The Girl with the Horn-Rimmed Glasses”, which became an international bestseller.

== Actress ==
Barry performed in over 400 national television commercials, 32 theatrical productions, and approximately 100 television shows and films, including appearances in the Star Trek episode "Arena" (S01 E18) and the Next Generation episode "Home Soil" (S01 E18).

== Teacher ==
From 1983 to 1989, Barry founded and ran the Professional Artist Group, which was the largest training and casting facility in the U.S.

Since 1982, The Carolyne Barry Workshops have offered independent full training programs in Hollywood. Barry trained thousands of professional actors. She was recognized as one of the top commercial audition teachers. In 2009, she was the winner of Backstage West's Favorite Commercial Teacher in Los Angeles.

Barry was featured in The Hollywood Reporter, L.A. Reader, Los Angeles Herald-Examiner as well as on CNN, KHJ (AM), KTTV and numerous TV and radio talk shows. In 2008, Barry wrote the Commercial Break column for Backstage West.

== Director ==
Barry directed dozens of on-camera sales presentations, pilot presentations, training videos and actor presentations as well as five theatrical productions in New York City and Los Angeles. In 1995, she co-created and directed Hysterical Blindness, a musical comedy that ran in Los Angeles for five months and then went to off-Broadway, where it had an extensive run.

== Casting director ==
Barry did commercial casting for numerous directors and advertising agencies, and cast more than 600 national and regional commercial campaigns.

== Writer ==
In 1976, Barry co-wrote and starred in the film Dark August, which enjoyed wide distribution and video release.

== Author ==
Barry created Lights, Camera, Kids, a DVD program that helps children start their careers, and she co-created the CD program Getting the Job, to help actors do their best at auditions.

She also wrote Hit the Ground Running, designed to help new actors start and succeed in their acting careers.
