= Marsha Hunt (actress, born 1917) =

American actress (1917–2022)

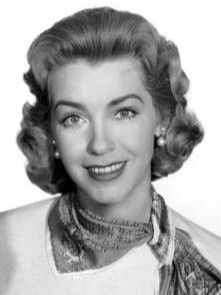
- Hunt in a 1959 publicity photo
- Born: Marcia Virginia Hunt; October 17, 1917; Chicago, Illinois, U.S.
- Died: September 7, 2022 (aged 104); Los Angeles, California, U.S.
- Occupations: Actress; model; activist
- Years active: 1935–2014
- Works: Full list
- Spouses: Jerry Hopper (m. 1938; div. 1943) Robert Presnell Jr. (m. 1946; died 1986)
- Children: 1

Marsha Hunt (born Marcia Virginia Hunt; October 17, 1917 – September 7, 2022) was an American actress with a career spanning nearly 80 years. She was blacklisted by Hollywood film studio executives in the 1950s during McCarthyism.

She appeared in many films, including Born to the West (1937) with John Wayne, Pride and Prejudice (1940) with Greer Garson and Laurence Olivier, Kid Glove Killer (1942) with Van Heflin, Cry 'Havoc' (1943) with Margaret Sullavan and Joan Blondell, The Human Comedy (1943) with Mickey Rooney, Raw Deal (1948) with Claire Trevor, The Happy Time (1952) with Charles Boyer, and Dalton Trumbo's Johnny Got His Gun (1971).

In the midst of the blacklist era, she became active in the humanitarian cause of world hunger and in her later years aided homeless shelters, supported same-sex marriage, raised awareness of climate change, and promoted peace in Third World countries.

== Early life ==
Hunt was born on October 17, 1917, in Chicago, Illinois, the youngest of two daughters. Her parents were Earl Hunt, a lawyer and later a Social Security Administrator, and Minabel Hunt, a vocal teacher, and organist. Her elder sister, Marjorie, a teacher, died in 2002. Marcia later changed the spelling of her first name to Marsha.

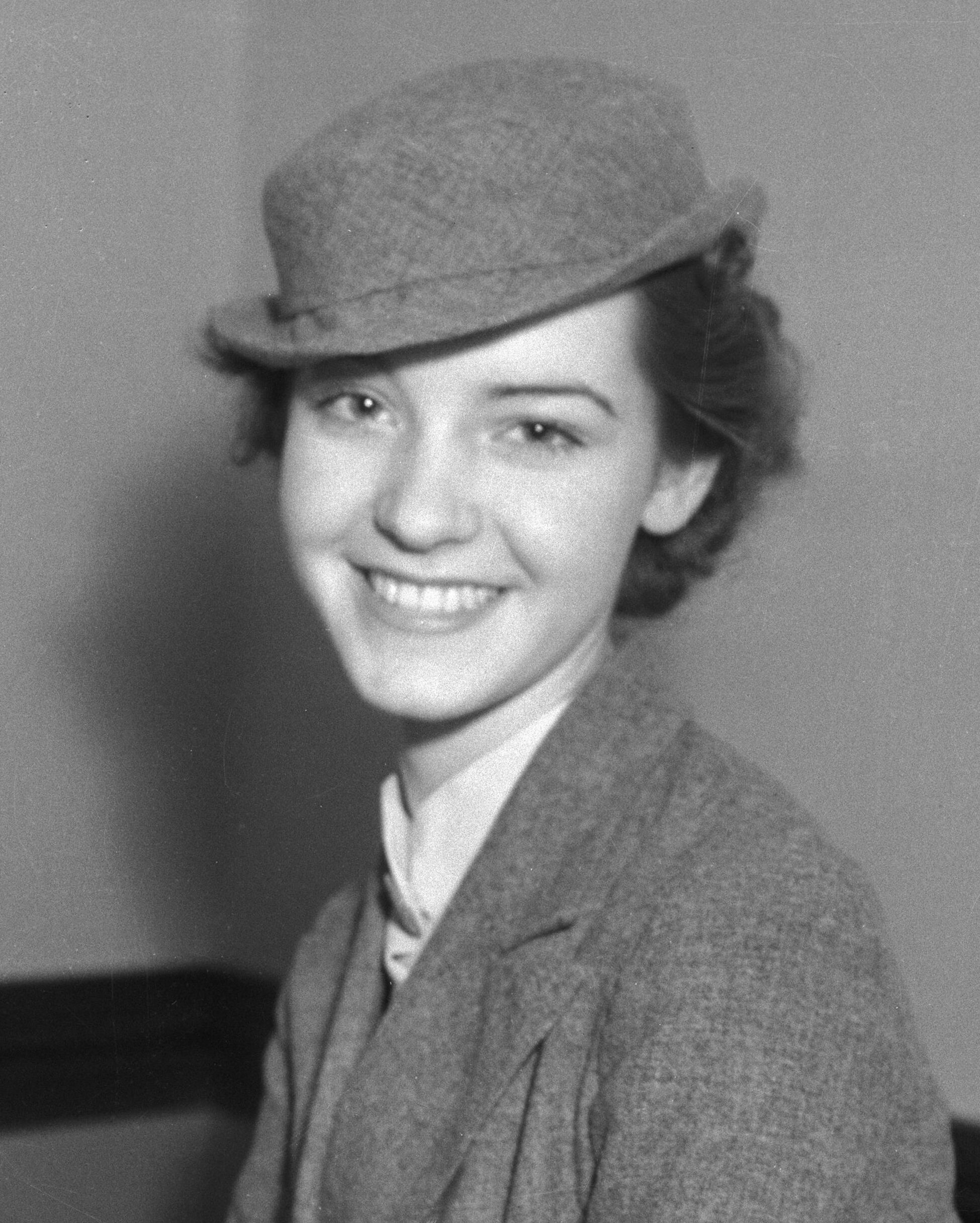
Marsha Hunt in the 1930s

Hunt and her family were active in the Methodist church. Interviewed for a 1999 book, she said about her family:

I lucked into the most fortuitous, warm, constructive kind of family context imaginable. My father was a top scholar, a Phi Beta Kappa. My mother was a voice coach and accompanist of singers in the concert and opera fields. We didn't have the term "liberated woman", but my mother certainly was...They were brought up, both, in the state of Indiana, which is now called the Bible Belt. They were wholesome, they neither smoked nor drank, and they never used the Lord's name in vain. I never heard a four-letter word. It didn't exist in my wholesome family setting.

Hunt's family moved to New York City when she was young, and she began performing in school plays and church functions. She graduated from the Horace Mann High School for Girls in 1934 at age 16.

== Career ==
=== Modeling ===
Hunt's parents wanted her to pursue a college degree, but Hunt, unable to "locate a single college or university in the land where you could major in drama before your third year", found work modeling for the John Powers Agency and began taking stage acting classes at the Theodora Irvine Studio. She was one of the highest-earning models by 1935. In May 1935, she planned on studying stage acting at the Royal Academy of Dramatic Art in the United Kingdom.

=== Years at Paramount ===
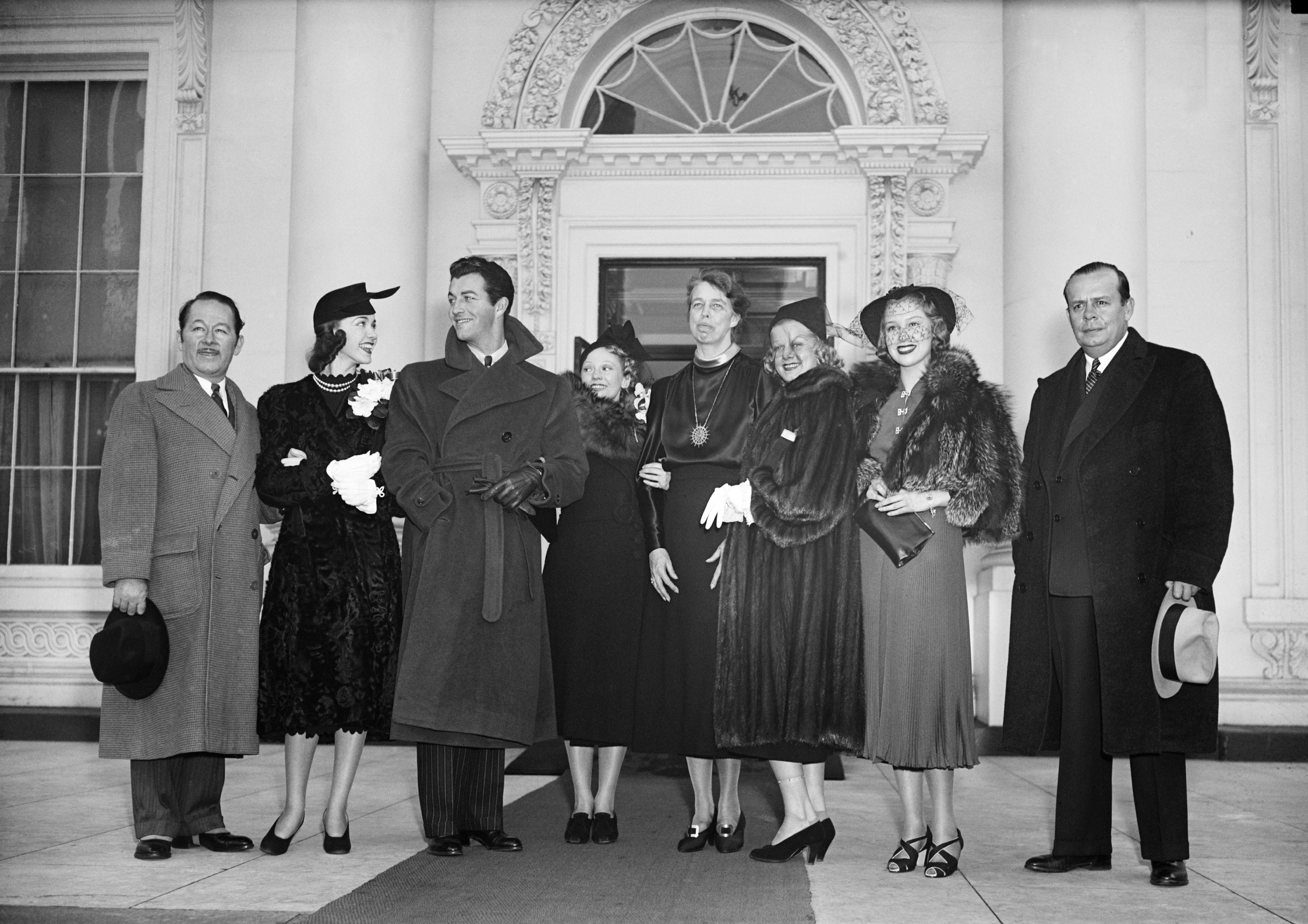
Celebrities including Hunt, Robert Taylor, Jean Harlow and Mitzi Green were invited to Washington, D.C., to assist with President's Birthday Ball fundraising activities (1937; Eleanor Roosevelt at center)

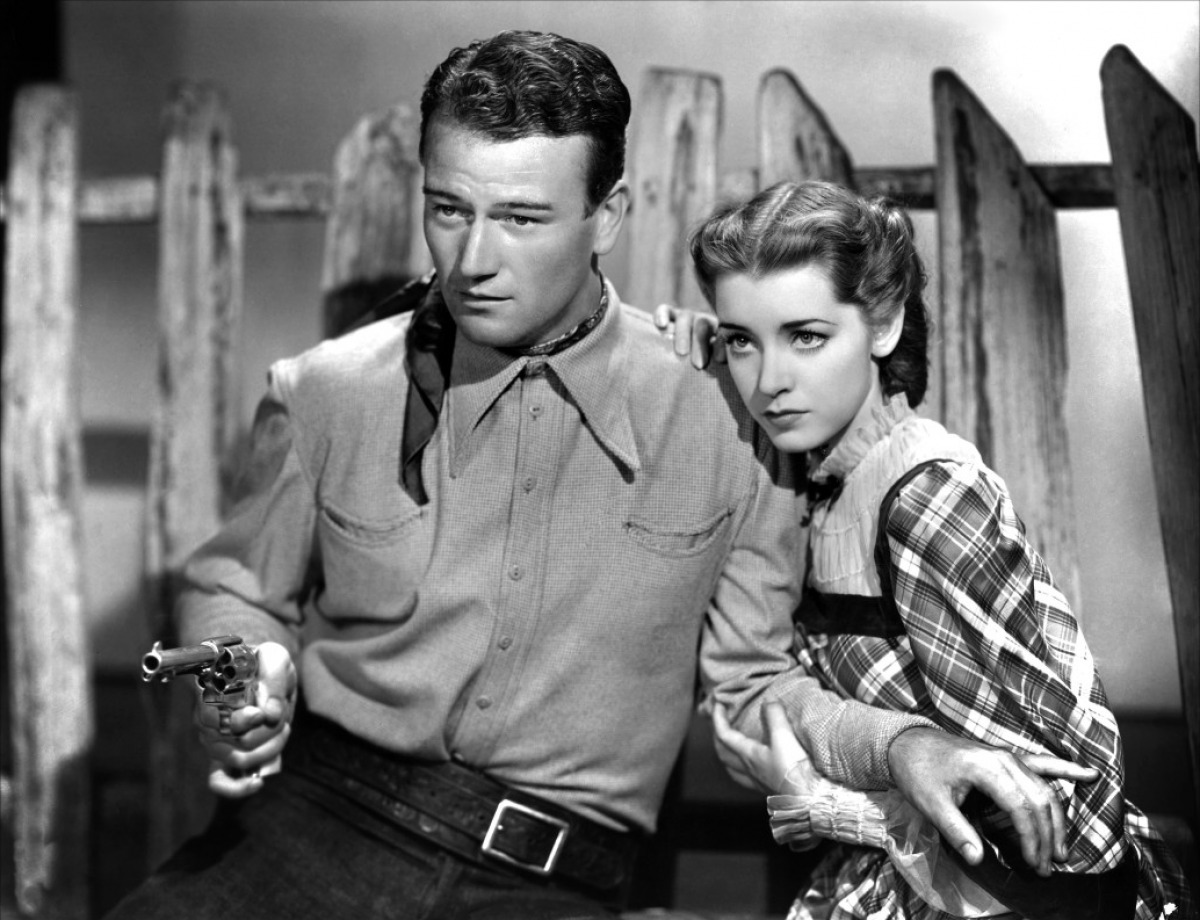
With John Wayne in Born to the West (1937)

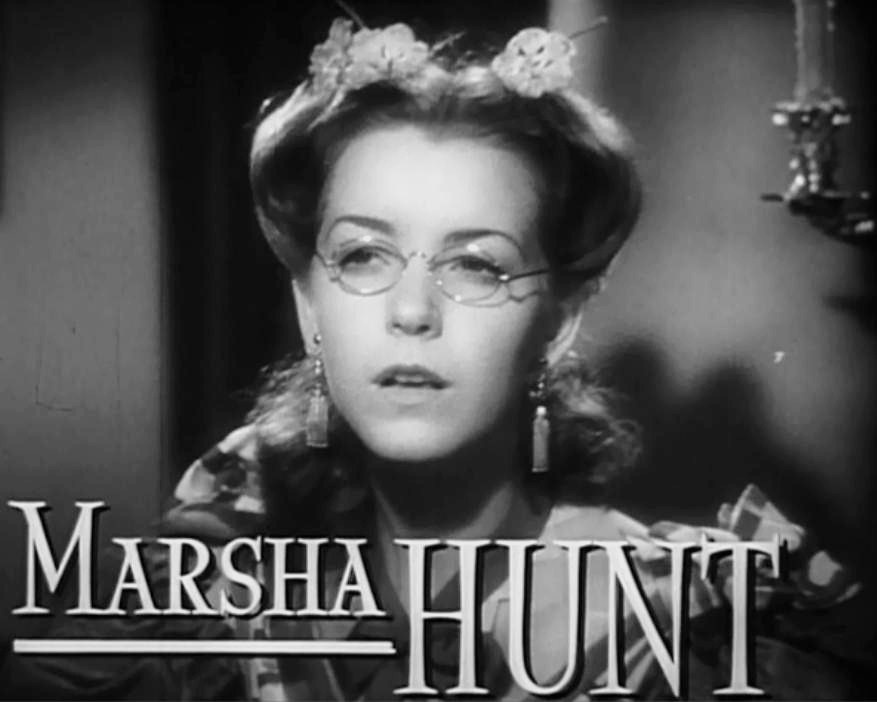
In the Pride and Prejudice trailer (1940)

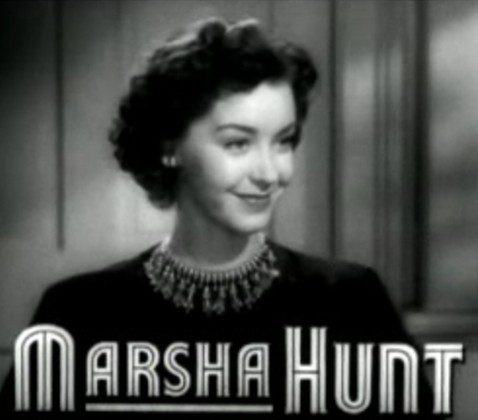
In the trailer for Cry 'Havoc' (1943)

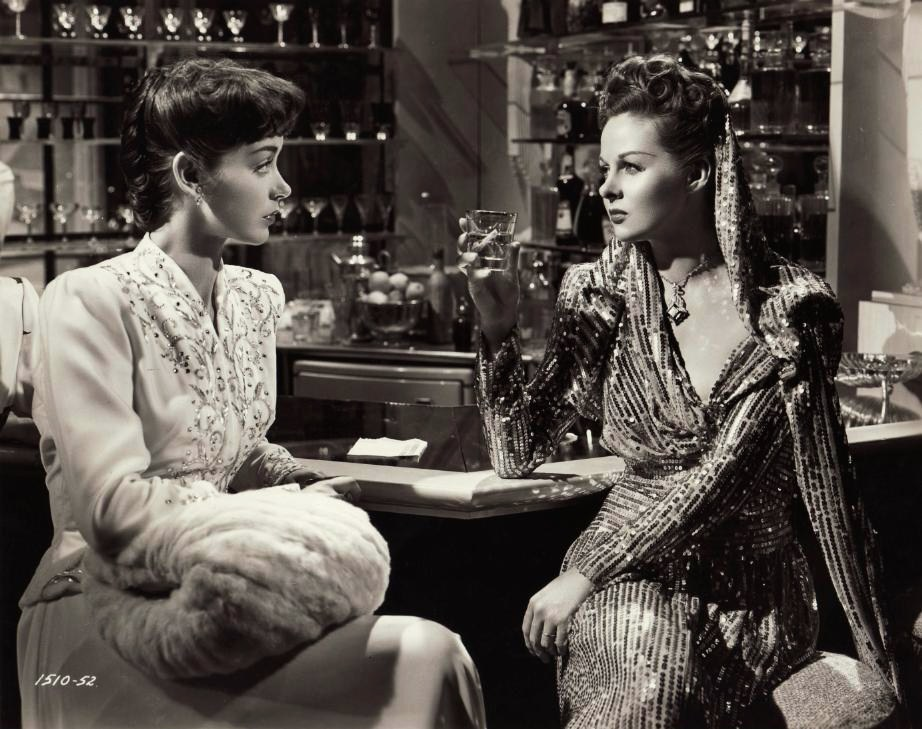
With Susan Hayward (on right) in Smash-Up, the Story of a Woman (1947)

Although initially reluctant to pursue a film career, in June 1935, at age 17, Hunt signed a seven-year contract with Paramount Pictures. Paramount discovered her when she was visiting her uncle in Los Angeles and the comedian Zeppo Marx (of the Marx Brothers fame) saw a picture of her in the newspaper. She was then offered a screen test for The Virginia Judge. At Paramount, Hunt mainly played ingenue parts. Between 1935 and 1938, she made 12 pictures at Paramount, including starring roles in Easy to Take (1936), Gentle Julia (1936), The Accusing Finger (1936), Murder Goes to College (1937), and two on "loan-out" to RKO and 20th Century Fox. In 1937, she starred opposite John Wayne, a couple of years before his breakthrough in Hollywood, in the Western film Born to the West.

The studio terminated Hunt's contract in 1938, and she spent a few years starring in B-films such as Star Reporter (1939) produced by poverty row studios such as Republic Pictures and Monogram Pictures. She also headed to New York City for work in summer stock theatre shortly before winning a supporting role in MGM's These Glamour Girls (1939) opposite Lana Turner and Lew Ayres. The role of Betty was said to have been written especially with Hunt in mind. Other roles in major studio productions soon followed, including supporting roles as Mary Bennet in MGM's version of Pride and Prejudice (1940) with Laurence Olivier, and as Martha Scott's surrogate child Hope Thompson in Cheers for Miss Bishop (1941).

=== Years at MGM ===
In 1941, Hunt signed a contract with MGM, where she remained for the next six years. While filming Blossoms in the Dust, film director Mervyn LeRoy lauded Hunt for her heartfelt and genuine acting ability. During this period she had starring roles in 21 films, including The Penalty (1941) opposite Lionel Barrymore, Panama Hattie (1942) opposite Ann Sothern and Red Skelton, and the war drama Pilot No. 5 (1943) in which she was cast as the love interest of Franchot Tone, and The Valley of Decision (1945). In 1944 she polled seventh in a list by exhibitors of "Stars of Tomorrow". She previously did a screen test to play Melanie Hamilton in Gone with the Wind (1939) and was told by David O. Selznick she would play the role, but to "keep it a secret for now." Three days later, it was announced that Olivia de Havilland was cast. In 1944, she appeared in None Shall Escape, a film that is now regarded as the first about the Holocaust. She played Marja Pacierkowski, the Polish fiancée of a German Nazi officer named Wilhelm Grimm.

=== Hollywood blacklist ===
In 1945, Hunt was invited to join the board of the Screen Actors Guild.

Disturbed by the actions of the House Committee on Unamerican Activities (HCUA), Hunt and her husband, screenwriter Robert Presnell Jr., became members of the Committee for the First Amendment in 1947. According to NPR, she was – at the time of her 100th birthday – the last surviving member of the group.

On October 26 that same year, aged 30, Hunt took part in Hollywood Fights Back, a star-studded radio program co-written by her husband protesting the activities of HCUA. In 2020, Hunt recalled:

We made our speeches and did a radio programme called Hollywood Fights Back and came home thinking we'd been patriots and had defended our profession. If there were some communists among us that was their business and not ours.

The next day, Hunt flew with a group of about 30 actors, directors, writers, and filmmakers (including John Huston, Humphrey Bogart, Lauren Bacall, and Danny Kaye) to Washington to protest the actions of HCUA. When she returned to Hollywood just three days later, things had changed. She was asked to denounce her activities if she wanted to find more work; she refused.

In 1950, Hunt was named as a potential Communist or Communist sympathizer (along with 151 other actors, writers, and directors) in the anti-Communist publication Red Channels. The publication claimed that her leanings were made evident by her supposedly subversive actions, including asking the Supreme Court to review the convictions of John Howard Lawson and Dalton Trumbo, recording a message in support of a rally organized by the Stop Censorship Committee in 1948, signing a statement in 1946 issued by the Hollywood Independent Citizens Committee of the Arts, Sciences and Professions (HICCASP), and speaking at a rally organized by the Progressive Citizens of America in 1946.

After the publication of Red Channels in 1950, work became scarce for Hunt and Presnell. Hunt said in 2012, "The town turned against us. Just about-face...I was appalled, hurt, shocked that journalism could be so far out in prejudice."

After her 1950 blacklisting, Hunt found most work in television, not film. She appeared in only a handful of films during the next eight years. She later recalled:

Agencies and producers agreed to deem all one hundred and fifty "unemployable". That actually began the blacklist practice, ending all our careers and livelihoods in broadcasting. I don't know that the movie studios would have blacklisted me if Red Channels hadn't named me and made them think I might be a Communist. So to play safe, they put me on their secret blacklist...I think by 1950 it was clear that the whole of show business was under political siege. But, miraculously, the Broadway stage was spared. People were not denied work on the Broadway stage. Movies, radio and television were overcome, but the theatre was not. When I was unable to work in any of the blacklist media, I could always do a play in stock, around the country.

During an interview in 1995, Hunt stated that she believed producer Richard J. Collins was among those responsible for her inclusion on the blacklist. She later said:

I never met Richard Collins, but when he was in some executive post on Bonanza, a friend of mine knew him slightly. At one point, when I was recommended for a script, she was astonished to hear him say, "Don't bother bringing up Marsha Hunt to me. As long as I am connected with this show, she will never work on it."

In 1957, her career began to pick up. She appeared in six films during the next three years before announcing her semi-retirement in 1960.

Throughout her life, Hunt was an outspoken liberal and progressive Democrat who frequently leveraged her public platform to champion early anti-fascist movements, New Deal policies, and civil liberties—a staunch ideological commitment that remained a defining feature of her career even after it led to her being blacklisted during the McCarthy era.

=== Later work ===
Following her semi-retirement in 1960, Hunt appeared in small roles in five films and numerous television shows, including an episode of the medical drama Breaking Point. In 1962, she appeared in the season-nine episode of Gunsmoke titled "The Glory and the Mud". In 1967, she had a leading role as Katie's Aunt Cecile in an episode of My Three Sons entitled "The Aunt Who Came To Dinner".

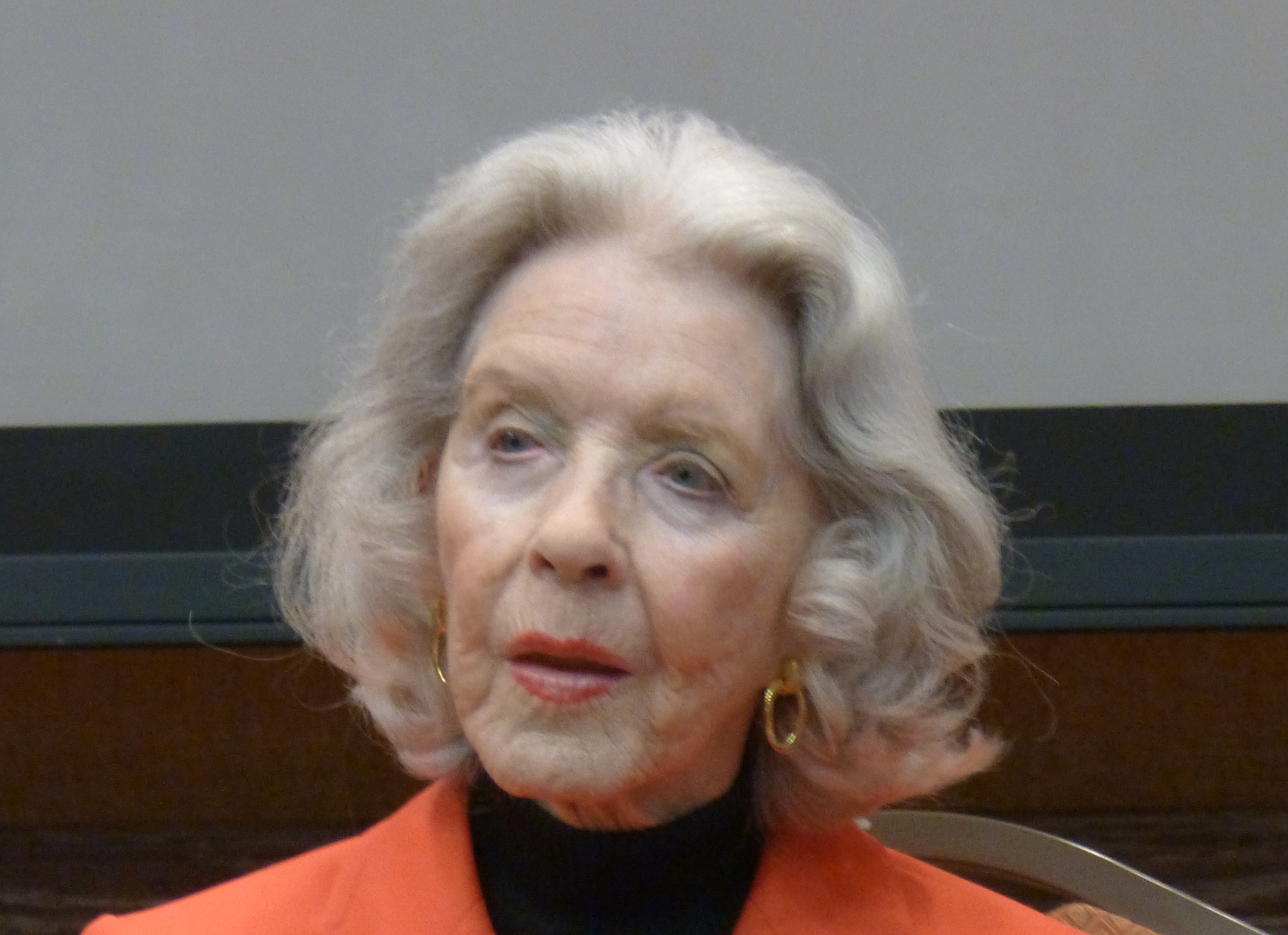
Hunt in 2013

In 1971, she appeared in the film Johnny Got His Gun, written by fellow blacklist member Dalton Trumbo, playing the mother of the title character, portrayed by Timothy Bottoms. It won the Grand Prix at the 1971 Cannes Film Festival. On February 8, 1988, she appeared in Star Trek: The Next Generation in the episode "Too Short a Season" as Anne Jameson, wife of an admiral who took an age-reversing drug. In 1997, she appeared as Ethel Thayer in the Santa Susana Repertory Company's production of On Golden Pond.

In 1993, her book The Way We Wore: Styles of the 1930s and '40s and Our World Since Then was published by Fallbrook Publishing.

She produced the CD Tony London: Songs From the Heart with the Page Cavanaugh Trio which includes two of the 50 songs Hunt has composed.

Hunt played Elizabeth Lyons in Chloe's Prayer, a 2006 film. In 2008, Hunt appeared in a short film noir, The Grand Inquisitor, as Hazel Reedy, the could-be widow of one of America's most infamous unapprehended serial killers.

In 2013, Hunt debuted a clip of a song she wrote 40 years earlier titled "Here's to All Who Love" about love and same-sex marriage. Sung by Glee guest actor Bill A. Jones, the clip immediately went viral. It was featured in Marsha Hunt's Sweet Adversity, a documentary about her life. The documentary debuted at the Palm Springs and Santa Barbara International Film Festivals in January 2015.

When she was 99 in April 2017, Hunt made a public appearance at the 2017 Los Angeles Jewish Film Festival to honor the achievements of actor and activist Ed Asner.

== Humanitarian work ==
In 1955, after a trip opened her eyes to the issue of hunger in the Third World, Hunt gave speeches throughout the United States, encouraging Americans to join the fight against starvation in the Third World by joining the United Nations Association. Hunt was a founder of the San Fernando Valley Mayor's Fund for the Homeless and helped to open one of the first homeless shelters in the San Fernando Valley. In 1960, she produced an hour-long telecast about refugee problems that featured stars such as Paul Newman, Jean Simmons, and Bing Crosby. She raised funds for the creation of Rose Cottage, a daycare shelter for homeless children; and served for many years on the advisory board of directors for the San Fernando Valley Community Mental Health Center, a large non-profit, where she advocated for adults and children affected by homelessness and mental illness. She was named honorary mayor of Sherman Oaks, California, in 1983.

Hunt still identified as a political liberal and was very concerned with such issues as global pollution, worldwide poverty, peace in Third World nations, and population growth.

== Personal life and death ==
Hunt married director Jerry Hopper, assistant head of the editing department at Paramount and later a director, on November 23, 1938. They divorced in 1943.

Hunt married her second husband, screenwriter and radio director Robert Presnell Jr. on February 10, 1946.

Hunt was pregnant and very sick while filming Carnegie Hall. Her only biological child, a premature daughter, was born on July 1, 1947, and died the next day. She and her second husband later became foster parents. They remained together until his death on June 14, 1986, at age 71.

Hunt resided in the Sherman Oaks neighborhood of Los Angeles, in a home she had owned since 1946. She died there from natural causes on September 7, 2022, at the age of 104.

== Awards and honors ==
- On February 8, 1960, Hunt received a star on the Hollywood Walk of Fame at 6658 Hollywood Boulevard.
- In 1999, she was one of the 250 actresses nominated for the American Film Institute's selection of the 25 greatest female screen legends who debuted before 1950.
- In 2002, she received a Golden Boot Award for her contributions to Western television shows and films.
- In March 2015, it was announced that Hunt would be honored with the inaugural "Marsha Hunt for Humanity Award" at a Hollywood screening series founded by Kat Kramer, daughter of the late film director Stanley Kramer and actress Karen Sharpe.
- In 2016, Hunt received the Cinecon Legacy Award at the 52nd annual Cinecon Classic Film Festival in Hollywood. It was presented by Stan Taffel who interviewed her after a screening of None Shall Escape.
- Three of the films in which Hunt has appeared have won the Academy Award. Both Pride and Prejudice and Blossoms in the Dust received an Oscar in the category Academy Award for Best Production Design in 1941 and 1942 respectively. The Human Comedy received an Oscar in the now-defunct category Academy Award for Best Story in 1944.
