= List of awards and nominations received by Fred Zinnemann =

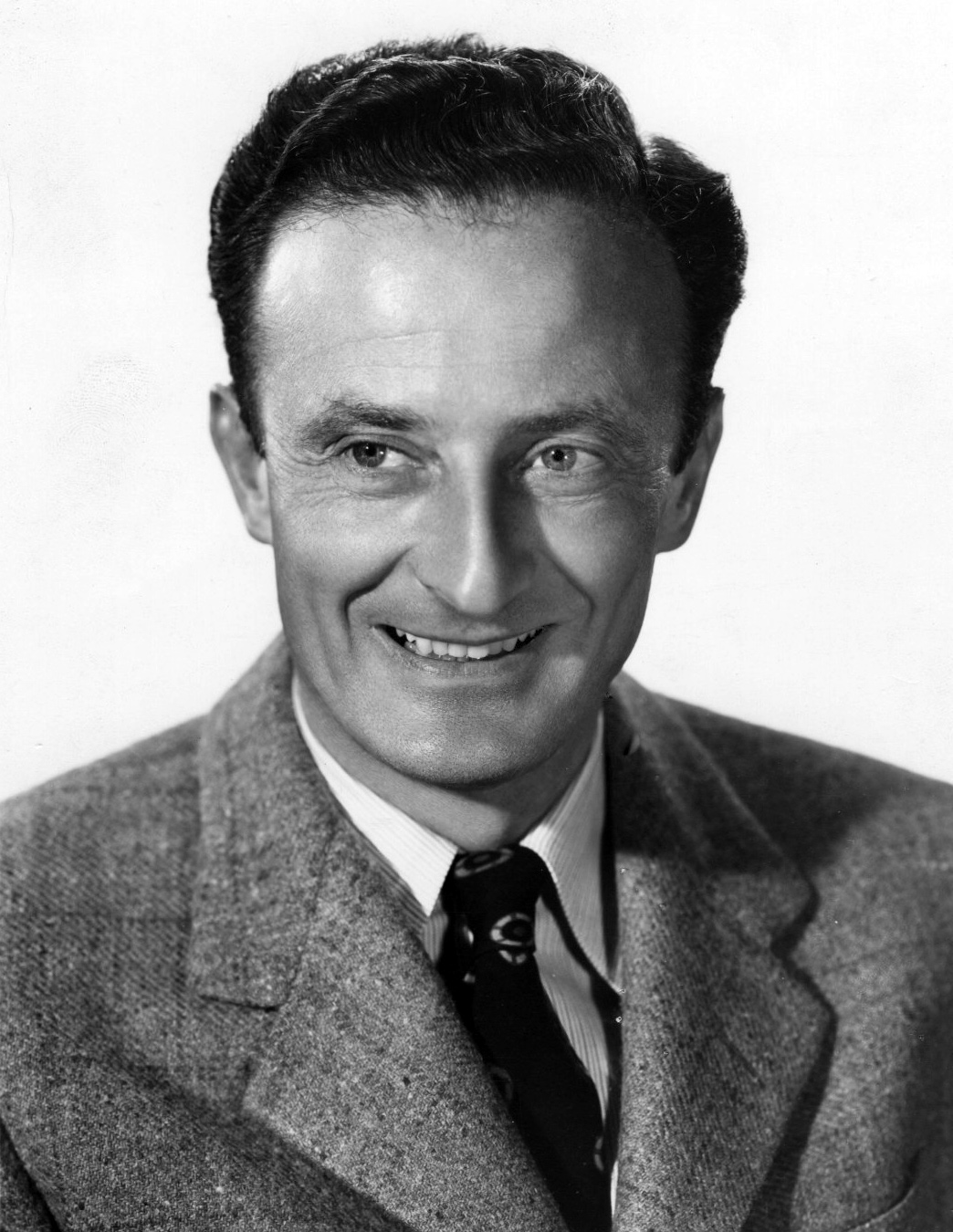
Zinnemann in the 1940s

This article is a list of awards and nominations received by Fred Zinnemann

Zinnemann has received numerous accolades including three Academy Awards, two BAFTA Awards, and two Golden Globe Awards. In 1977 he was awarded the BAFTA Fellowship. He also received two Directors Guild of America Awards, and four New York Film Critics Circle Awards as well as prizes from the Cannes Film Festival, Berlin International Film Festival, and Venice International Film Festival.

He won three Academy Awards for Best Documentary Short Film for Benjy (1951), and Best Picture and Best Director for historical costume drama A Man for All Seasons (1966). Zinnemann also received nominations for the Academy Award for Best Director for his films The Search (1948), High Noon (1952), From Here to Eternity (1953), The Nun's Story (1959), The Sundowners (1960), and Julia (1977).

== Major associations ==
=== Academy Awards ===
Year	Category	Nominated work	Result	Ref.
1948	Best Director	The Search	Nominated	
1951	Best Documentary Short Film	Benjy	Won	
1952	Best Director	High Noon	Nominated	
1954	Best Director	From Here to Eternity	Won	
1959	Best Director	The Nun's Story	Nominated	
1960	Best Picture	The Sundowners	Nominated	
1960	Best Director	The Sundowners	Nominated	
1966	Best Picture	A Man for All Seasons	Won	
1966	Best Director	A Man for All Seasons	Won	
1977	Best Director	Julia	Nominated	

=== BAFTA Awards ===
Year	Category	Nominated work	Result	Ref.
British Academy Film Awards
1959	Best Film	The Nun's Story	Nominated	
1959	UN Award	The Nun's Story	Nominated	
1967	Best Film	A Man for All Seasons	Won	
1967	Outstanding British Film	A Man for All Seasons	Won	
1973	Best Direction	The Day of the Jackal	Nominated	
1977	BAFTA Fellowship		Received	
1978	Best Direction	Julia	Nominated	

=== Golden Globe Awards ===
Year	Category	Nominated work	Result	Ref.
1953	Best Director	From Here to Eternity	Won	
1957	Best Director	A Hatful of Rain	Nominated	
1959	Best Director	The Nun's Story	Nominated	
1960	Best Director	The Sundowners	Nominated	
1966	Best Director	A Man for All Seasons	Won	
1973	Best Director	The Day of the Jackal	Nominated	
1977	Best Director	Julia	Nominated	

== Industry awards ==
=== Directors Guild of America Awards ===
Year	Category	Nominated work	Result	Ref.
1948	Outstanding Directing - Feature Film	The Search	Nominated	
1952	Outstanding Directing - Feature Film	High Noon	Nominated	
1953	Outstanding Directing - Feature Film	From Here to Eternity	Won	
1957	Outstanding Directing - Feature Film	A Hatful of Rain	Nominated	
1959	Outstanding Directing - Feature Film	The Nun's Story	Nominated	
1966	Outstanding Directing - Feature Film	A Man for All Seasons	Won	
1969	Lifetime Achievement Award		Received	
1977	Outstanding Directing - Feature Film	Julia	Nominated	

=== National Board of Review ===
Year	Category	Nominated work	Result	Ref.
1959	Best Director	The Nun's Story	Nominated	
1966	Best Director	A Man for All Seasons	Won	

=== New York Film Critics Circle ===
Year	Category	Nominated work	Result	Ref.
1952	Best Director	High Noon	Won	
1953	Best Director	From Here to Eternity	Won	
1959	Best Director	The Nun's Story	Won	
1960	Best Director	The Sundowners	Nominated	
1966	Best Director	A Man for All Seasons	Won	

== International awards ==
=== Berlin International Film Festival ===
Year	Category	Nominated work	Result	Ref.
1986	Berlinale Camera		Received	

=== Cannes Film Festival ===
Year	Category	Nominated work	Result	Ref.
1949	Palme d'Or	Act of Violence	Nominated	
1954	Palme d'Or	From Here to Eternity	Nominated	
1954	Special Prize	From Here to Eternity	Won	

=== César Awards ===
Year	Category	Nominated work	Result	Ref.
1979	Best Foreign Film	Julia	Nominated	

=== Venice International Film Festival ===
Year	Category	Nominated work	Result	Ref.
1948	Golden Lion	The Search	Nominated	
1951	Golden Lion	Teresa	Nominated	
1957	Golden Lion	A Hatful of Rain	Nominated	
1957	Pasinetti Award	A Hatful of Rain	Won	
1957	OCIC Award	A Hatful of Rain	Won	

== Awards and nominations by film ==
Year	Film	Oscar nominations	Oscar wins	BAFTA nominations	BAFTA wins	Golden Globe nominations	Golden Globe wins
1936	Redes (with Emilio Gómez Muriel)			n/a	n/a	n/a	n/a
1942	Kid Glove Killer			n/a	n/a	n/a	n/a
1942	Eyes in the Night			n/a	n/a	n/a	n/a
1944	The Seventh Cross	1		n/a	n/a	n/a	n/a
1946	Little Mister Jim			n/a	n/a	n/a	n/a
1947	My Brother Talks to Horses			n/a	n/a	n/a	n/a
1948	The Search	4	1	1	1	n/a	n/a
1949	Act of Violence					n/a	n/a
1950	The Men	1		1		n/a	n/a
1951	Teresa	1				1	1
1952	High Noon	7	4			7	4
1952	The Member of the Wedding	1					
1953	From Here to Eternity	13	8	1		2	2
1955	Oklahoma!	4	2				
1957	A Hatful of Rain	1		1		3	
1959	The Nun's Story	8		5	1	5	
1960	The Sundowners	5		3		1	
1964	Behold a Pale Horse						
1966	A Man For All Seasons	8	6	7	7	5	4
1973	The Day of the Jackal	1		7	1	3	
1977	Julia	11	3	10	4	7	2
1982	Five Days One Summer						
	Total	66	24	36	14	34	13
