= Dzidra =

Female given name

- Gender: Female
- Name day: May 27

Origin
- Origin: From dzidrs, "clear"
- Region of origin: Latvia

Dzidra is a Latvian feminine given name. The name day of persons named Dzidra is May 27.

== Notable people named Dzidra ==
- Dzidra Rinkule-Zemzare (1920–2007), Latvian poet
- Dzidra Ritenberga (1928–2003), Latvian actress and film director
- Dzidra Uztupe-Karamiševa (1930–2014), Latvian basketball player and trainer
