= 18th Venice International Film Festival =

Italian film festival in 1957

- Location: Venice, Italy
- Founded: 1932
- Awards: Golden Lion: Aparajito
- Festival date: 25 August – 8 September 1957
- Website: Website

Venice Film Festival chronology
- 19th 17th

The 18th annual Venice International Film Festival was held from 25 August to 8 September 1957.

French filmmaker René Clair was the Jury President for the main competition. The Golden Lion was awarded to Aparajito by Satyajit Ray.

== Jury ==
- René Clair, French filmmaker - Jury President
- Vittorio Bonicelli, Italian film critic
- Miguel Perez Ferrero, Spanish film critic and writer
- Ettore Giannini, Italian screenwriter
- Penelope Houston, British film critic
- Arthur Knight, American film critic
- Ivan Pyryev, Soviet filmmaker

== Official Sections ==
The following films were selected to be screened:

=== Main Competition ===
English title	Original title	Director(s)	Production country
Aparajito	অপরাজিত	Satyajit Ray	India
The Baby Carriage	乳母車	Tomotaka Tasaka	Japan
Bitter Victory		Nicholas Ray	United States
Dreams in a Drawer	I sogni nel cassetto	Renato Castellani	Italy
An Eye for an Eye	Oeil pour oeil	André Cayatte	France
A Hatful of Rain		Fred Zinnemann	United States
Kanał		Andrzej Wajda	Poland
Malva	Мальва	Vladimir Braun	Soviet Union
The Man Who Wagged His Tail	Un ángel pasó por Brooklyn	Ladislao Vajda	Spain, Italy
Only People	Samo ljudi	Branko Bauer	Yugoslavia
Los salvajes		Rafael Baledón	Mexico
Shadow	Cien	Jerzy Kawalerowicz	Poland
Something of Value		Richard Brooks	United States
The Story of Esther Costello		David Miller	United Kingdom
Throne of Blood	蜘蛛巣城	Akira Kurosawa	Japan
White Nights	Le Notti Bianche	Luchino Visconti	Italy
Women in My Life	نساء في حياتي	Fatin Abdulwahhab	Egypt

=== Informativa ===
English title	Original title	Director(s)	Production country
12 Angry Men		Sidney Lumet	United States
Albert Schweitzer		Jerome Hill	United States
The Betrothed	永すぎた春	Shigeo Tanaka	Japan
Carnival Night	Karnavalnaya noch	Eldar Ryazanov	Soviet Union
The Case of Doctor Laurent	Le cas du Docteur Laurent	Jean-Paul Le Chanois	France
City at Night	Città di notte	Leopoldo Trieste	Italy
Fugitive in Saigon	Mort en fraude	Marcel Camus	France
A Generation	Pokolenie	Andrzej Wajda	Poland
Il Grido		Michelangelo Antonioni	Italy
Hell Drivers		Cy Endfield	United Kingdom
Land of Men	Tierra de hombres	Ismael Rodríguez	Mexico
Love Is at Stake	L'amour est en jeu	Marc Allégret	France
Miracle in Soho		Julian Amyes	United Kingdom
Miracle of the White Suit	Un traje blanco	Rafael Gil	Spain
L'oceano ci chiama		Giorgio Ferroni, Giovanni Roccardi	Italy
Patrouille de choc		Claude Bernard-Aubert	France
The Real End of the Great War	Prawdziwy Koniec Wielkiej Wojny	Jerzy Kawalerowicz	Poland
Rendez-vous à Melbourne		René Lucot	France
Ritual of Love	Paradiso terrestre	Luciano Emmer, Robert Enrico	Italy
Sunday Romance	Bakaruhában	Imre Fehér	Hungary
The Teacher and the Miracle	El maestro	Aldo Fabrizi	Spain, Italy
Todo sea para bien		Carlos Rinaldi	Argentina
Vintage Car	Dedecek automobil	Alfréd Radok	Czechoslovakia

== Official Awards ==
=== Main Competition ===
- Golden Lion: Aparajito by Satyajit Ray
- Silver Lion: Le Notti Bianche by Luchino Visconti
- Volpi Cup for Best Actor: Anthony Franciosa for A Hatful of Rain
- Volpi Cup for Best Actress: Dzidra Ritenberga for Malva

== Independent Awards ==
=== New Cinema Award ===
- Best Film: Aparajito by Satyajit Ray
- Best Actor: Anthony Franciosa for A Hatful of Rain
- Best Actress: Eva Marie Saint for A Hatful of Rain

=== San Giorgio Prize ===
- Something of Value by Richard Brooks

=== FIPRESCI Prize ===
- Aparajito by Satyajit Ray

=== OCIC Award ===
- A Hatful of Rain by Fred Zinnemann

=== Pasinetti Award ===
- A Hatful of Rain by Fred Zinnemann
