= I Come in Peace =

1990 film by Craig R. Baxley

- Theatrical release poster
- Directed by: Craig R. Baxley
- Written by: Jonathan Tydor; David Koepp
- Produced by: Jeff Young; Jon Turtle; Rafael Eisenman
- Starring: Dolph Lundgren; Brian Benben; Betsy Brantley
- Cinematography: Mark Irwin
- Edited by: Mark Helfrich
- Music by: Jan Hammer
- Production companies: Epic Productions; Trans World Entertainment; Vision International; Vision PDG
- Distributed by: Triumph Releasing Corporation; Vision International
- Release date: September 28, 1990
- Running time: 91 minutes
- Country: United States
- Language: English
- Budget: $5–8 million
- Box office: $4.3 million

I Come in Peace (released under the alternative title Dark Angel) is a 1990 American science fiction action film directed by Craig R. Baxley, and starring Dolph Lundgren, Brian Benben, Betsy Brantley and Matthias Hues. The film was released in the United States on September 28, 1990.

The film is about a rule-breaking vice cop who becomes involved in the investigation of mysterious drug-related murders on the streets of Houston, Texas.

The original title is Dark Angel; the film was planned to be released under the same title in the United States (which had the latest release) but was renamed by Triumph Releasing to I Come in Peace because of two other movies entitled The Dark Angel (from 1925 and 1935), according to executive producer Mark Damon (in a 1993 interview with UK magazine Impact), who preferred the original title.

== Plot ==
Houston police detective Jack Caine will not let police procedure prevent him from pursuing his mission to wipe out the White Boys, a gang of white collar drug dealers who killed his partner while Caine was stopping a convenience store robbery.

The White Boys disguise their narcotics trafficking behind the visage of expensive luxury sports cars, executive level jobs, and flashy designer suits. Led by the vicious but urbane Victor Manning, the White Boys operate above accusation but not suspicion. When the White Boys steal a shipment of heroin from a federal evidence warehouse, they hide evidence of their involvement by blowing up the facility, killing or injuring numerous people. This brings in the FBI, and Caine is partnered with a by-the-book agent, Arwood "Larry" Smith. They investigate the drug theft and the later murder of several key White Boys soldiers by a hyper-fast spinning disk. At the same time, Caine is made aware - via his girlfriend, coroner Diane Pallone - of a series of strange drug-related deaths. The corpses are full of heroin, but the cause of death is a puncture wound to the forehead. Unknown to Caine and the police, the deaths are caused by Talec, an alien who is extracting something from the victims. He is being pursued by Azeck, a similar alien to himself.

Azeck soon tracks Talec to a supermarket where a battle ensues. After being severely injured in the fight, Azeck is able to sneak into Caine's car as he and Smith investigate the bloody scene left at the supermarket. After Caine and Smith are ordered off the investigation by their superiors, they discover the mortally wounded Azeck in the back seat. Azeck explains that he is a police officer from his own home planet, and that Talec shoots his victims full of synthetic heroin and then uses alien technology to extract the resulting endorphins from their brains, synthesizing them into a drug called "Barsi" to be used by addicts on his home planet. He warns Caine and Smith that if Talec is not stopped, thousands of intergalactic drug dealers will come to Earth to slaughter its population, since Earth is seen as a cheap source of Barsi, which is extremely rare in the rest of the galaxy. Azeck dies and his body cremates itself - but Smith has retained Azeck's powerful handgun and intends to pass it onto his FBI superior, Inspector Switzer, to prove that the aliens exist. Caine warns Smith that Switzer should not be trusted and wants to give the gun to his own supervisor, Chief Malone. Smith pulls the gun on Caine, causing the two to disagree and separate.

Smith gives the weapon to Switzer, who reveals that the FBI already know about the aliens, and they intend on opening dialogue with Talec in order to gain technological and weapon advantages. He then attempts to shoot Smith, but Caine saves him at the last moment. Smith throws his pen and notepad on top of Switzer floating in the water. Thanks to information from Azeck, they track Talec down to an industrial complex but are waylaid by the White Boys who believe Caine to be behind the deaths of their soldiers. Talec arrives in the middle of the standoff and kills the remaining White Boys before being forced to retreat after Smith uses Azeck's weapon against him.

At the complex, Azeck's weapon runs out of charge and Talec attempts to kill Caine using his drug harpoon. While fending off the harpoon, Caine grabs a vial of the synthesized Barsi drug, and the two engage in hand-to-hand combat over the vial, resulting in Talec being impaled on a steel spike. Cain retrieves Talec's gun - a similar weapon to Azeck's - and shoots nearby drums of fuel, killing Talec in the resulting explosion.

With Talec dead, Caine and Smith realize that they have completed Azeck's mission: Talec will not return to his home world, and since no other drug dealers from his home planet know about Earth, there will be no invasion. As they leave the complex, Caine suggests paying Manning a visit.

== Cast ==
- Dolph Lundgren as Detective Jack Caine, a Houston police detective investigating a string of drug-related murders.
- Brian Benben as FBI Special Agent Arwood "Larry" Smith, an FBI agent and Caine's new partner.
- Betsy Brantley as Diane Pallone, a coroner and Caine's girlfriend.
- Matthias Hues as Talec, an extraterrestrial drug dealer.
- Jay Bilas as Azeck, an extraterrestrial police officer. Unlike Talec, he is fluent in English.
- Jim Haynie as Captain Malone, Caine's boss.
- David Ackroyd as Inspector Switzer, Smith's boss.
- Sherman Howard as Victor Manning, a white collar drug dealer and boss of the White Boys.
- Sam Anderson as Warren, underboss of the White Boys.
- Alex Morris as Detective Ray Turner, Caine's original partner. He is killed by the White Boys during a sting operation.

The film also stars Mark Lowenthal as Bruce, an eccentric and paranoid scientist; Michael J. Pollard as Boner, a petty criminal; Jesse Vint as McMurphy, Talec's first victim; Mimi Cochran as a car mechanic; Jack Willis as a liquor store owner; Tony Brubaker as a garage sweeper; Brandon Smith as a market clerk; Wayne Dehart as a market customer; and Al Leong (credited as Albert Leong) as a luggage salesman who tries to rip off the White Boys.

== Production ==
=== Development and writing ===
Screenwriter David Koepp was credited under the pseudonym Leonard Maas Jr. Vision PDG was the film's only credited production company. Lundgren said that he was attracted to I Come in Peace because the role offered more than action, including elements of romance, comedy and drama.

The conception of the alien antagonist changed during development. Lundgren recalled that Talec had originally been conceived with a cowboy-like appearance, including a black hat.

Director Craig R. Baxley's father, Paul Baxley, served as stunt coordinator on the film.

=== Filming ===
Principal photography took place in Houston, Texas, and ran approximately two weeks beyond its planned schedule, concluding in April 1989. The film had initially been scheduled for release on August 3, 1990, but was subsequently postponed to September 28.

=== Stunts ===
Matthias Hues, who portrayed the alien Talec, performed his own stunts as part of an arrangement with director Baxley. Hues recalled that the opaque contact lenses used for Talec severely restricted his vision, allowing him to see little more than shadows. He rehearsed movements without the lenses, memorising the positions of vehicles and other objects before performing the sequences with them in place.

Hues recalled one sequence involving vehicles and explosions in which he performed while wearing the contact lenses. He said the sequence culminated in a jump through a window while on fire, followed by a landing on a small camera rig approximately 70 ft (21 m) above the ground. In a 2008 interview, Hues described I Come in Peace as the most dangerous film he had worked on.

Lundgren also recalled Hues performing the character's action sequences, describing the stunt work as practical rather than relying on the digital effects techniques common in later productions. He said that Hues was able to perform feats that the professional stunt performers on the production could not match.

=== Character design ===
Hues recalled that he and Lundgren were of comparable height and that he wore specially made boots with three-inch soles to make Talec appear taller.

== Music ==
=== Soundtrack ===
The closing credits include "Touch Me Tonight" by Shooting Star, which had previously charted on the Billboard Hot 100 at number 67.

== Release ==
=== Theatrical ===
I Come In Peace was released in the United States on September 28, 1990. The film was released earlier as Dark Angel in other territories.

=== Home media ===
After the film's theatrical run, it was released on VHS and laserdisc in 1991 by Media Home Entertainment. A Region 2 (widescreen) and Region 4 (fullscreen) DVD is available in Europe, Japan and Australia. In September 2011, in the US a Manufactured On Demand widescreen DVD from MGM Classics Collection was available online. It was released under its original title, "Dark Angel".

A Blu-ray was released on August 27, 2013 by Shout! Factory as part of their Scream Factory label. This edition contains a 24 minutes retrospective featurette with new interview of the director Craig Baxley, Dolph Lundgren and Brian Benben, as well as a gallery of rare vintage posters, lobby cards and stills. Final Cut Entertainment released Dark Angel on Blu-ray for the 1st time in the UK on September 30, 2024, a bare bones release.

== Reception ==
=== Critical response ===
Rotten Tomatoes, a review aggregator, reports that 42% of 31 surveyed critics gave the film a positive review; the average rating is 4.3/10. Contemporary reviews were generally negative. Kevin Thomas of the Los Angeles Times called it "stale through and through, derived from countless cop-buddy formula thrillers, drenched in violence and devoid of so much as a whiff of real life." Caryn James of The New York Times wrote, "This story turns out to be much more mundane than its outrageously clever premise." Dave Kehr of the Chicago Tribune wrote that the film's imaginative weapons and humor make it an entertaining crowd-pleaser but criticized its cynical violence and lack of moral consciousness. Richard Harrington of The Washington Post compared it to Hardware and said its influences are more subtle, though it suffers from using too much humor. Chris Hicks of the Deseret News wrote that the film "isn't as bad as it has every right to be" and "provides some fun for fans of the genre". Lou Cedrone of The Baltimore Sun wrote, "Apart from the gore, I Come in Peace is an amusing mixture of action, science-fiction and comedy." Gary Thompson of the Philadelphia Daily News said that it is a better than usual rip-off of The Terminator with some original ideas. Time Out London wrote, "With an upbeat script and a healthy sense of humour, this is an unashamedly ridiculous affair with moderate ambitions and matching success."

More recent reviews have been more enthusiastic. Patrick Cooper of Bloody Disgusting rated it 4/5 stars and wrote that the film "is ripe for cult rediscovery." Anthony Arrigo of Dread Central rated it 4/5 stars and called it "one helluva fun time" and "a wildly entertaining, often brutal ride". Fred Topel of CraveOnline rated it 7/10 and wrote, "I Come In Peace is probably as good as it gets for theatrical leading man Dolph, and I highly recommend it." David Johnson of DVD Verdict called it "a gonzo slice of B-grade sci-fi tomfoolery". Ian Jane of DVD Talk rated it 3.5/5 stars and wrote that "it's about as brainless as an action movie can get but you can't help but have fun with it."

== See also ==
- Liquid Sky, a movie wherein an alien extracts endorphins from humans at the point of orgasm, killing them.
- Not of This Earth
