= Betsy Brantley =

American actress

- Born: 1955 (age 70–71)
- Education: University of North Carolina at Chapel Hill; Central School of Speech and Drama
- Occupation: Actress
- Years active: 1981–present
- Spouse: Steven Soderbergh (m. 1989; div. 1994)
- Children: 1

Betsy Brantley is an American actress. She has appeared in numerous films, plays, and television shows since the early 1980s. Her breakout role was in the 1982 film Five Days One Summer with Sean Connery.

== Early life ==
Betsy Brantley was born in 1955 to Jack R. Brantley, a textile executive, and Dotty Brantley (née Rabey). In 1960, Jack moved the family to Greensboro, North Carolina, moving into the same house on Meadowbrook Terrace where he grew up. In 1962 Jack moved the family to Rutherfordton, North Carolina, to serve as division president at dress-manufacturer Tanner. Betsy has a fraternal twin Alison, an older brother Jack Jr., and a younger brother Duncan who is a producer and screenwriter.

Growing up Brantley spent a great deal of her time in the Blue Ridge Mountains near Rutherfordton, where she developed a love for mountains. Her affinity with mountains helped her land her first major role in the film Five Days One Summer.

Brantley graduated from the University of North Carolina at Chapel Hill in 1977 and the Central School of Speech and Drama in the United Kingdom in 1980.

== Career ==
Brantley's first major role was Kate in the 1982 film Five Days One Summer with Sean Connery. The film's director, Fred Zinnemann, cast Brantley because he wanted a new, unfamiliar face. Zinnemann only auditioned young women with little or no acting experience because he didn't want audiences associating a known actress, who had been around the block a time or two on screen or in a publicized personal life, spoiling the illusion of virtue. Until her role in Five Days One Summer, her acting experience had been limited to a few roles in the English theater, a five-minute part in a British TV movie and a minor role in the film Shock Treatment.

Like Five Days One Summer, many of Brantley's films are based in Europe. Her most famous role, perhaps, is her portrayal of Neely Pritt in Shock Treatment (1981). She also played alongside Pierce Brosnan and Michael Caine in the film version of The Fourth Protocol (1987) and acted a cameo in the Ashley Judd movie Double Jeopardy (1999). Brantley was also the performance model for Jessica Rabbit in Who Framed Roger Rabbit (1988).

Along with roles in several other films, including Havana (1990) and Deep Impact (1998), Betsy has been a cast member in a number of television shows, including Tour of Duty and Second Noah. On Tour of Duty, she played the role of Dr. Jennifer Seymour (later Major Jennifer Seymour). On Second Noah, she played Jesse Beckett, a veterinarian and the mother of eight adopted children.

Brantley played Dolph Lundgren's girlfriend in Dark Angel (1990, retitled I Come in Peace in America).

She has also appeared as Elsie Cubitt in the Granada Television production of "The Dancing Men", from The Adventures of Sherlock Holmes by Sir Arthur Conan Doyle, and also appeared in the 1987 BBC Horizon film, Life Story (the story of the discovery of the DNA double helix) as James Watson's sister, Elizabeth Watson.

== Personal life ==
In 1986, Brantley married filmmaker Steven Soderbergh. She has one daughter, Sarah, with Soderbergh. Sarah lives in Seattle, Washington. Brantley and Soderbergh divorced in 1994.

Brantley is a private person and somewhat uncomfortable with the stardom she achieved. After her critical success with Five Days One Summer, she said "I'd like to have had my career move a little slower, I find the attention just a bit daunting."

Brantley lives in a pre–Civil War era home in the Montford, Virginia area with her pet cat Blueberry.

== Filmography ==
=== Film ===
Year	Title	Role	Notes
1981	Shock Treatment	Neely Pritt	
1982	Five Days One Summer	Kate	
1984	Another Country	Julie Schofield	
1987	The Fourth Protocol	Eileen McWhirter	
1987	The Princess Bride	The Mother	
1988	Who Framed Roger Rabbit	Jessica's Performance Model	
1990	I Come in Peace	Diane Pallone	aka Dark Angel
1990	Havana	Diane	
1993	Flesh and Bone	Peg	
1993	Shepherd on the Rock	Jean	
1996	Schizopolis	Mrs. Munson / Attractive Woman No. 2	
1997	Washington Square	Mrs. Montgomery	
1998	Mercury Rising	Special Ed Teacher No. 2	
1998	Deep Impact	Ellen Biederman	
1999	The Encounter	Waitress	Short
1999	Rogue Trader	Brenda Granger	
1999	Double Jeopardy	Prosecutor	
2002	The Angel Doll	Mary Barlow	
2008	This Man's Life	Mrs. Zimmerman	Short
2022	Kimi	Kimi	Voice

=== Television ===
Year	Title	Role	Notes
1984	Sherlock Holmes	Elsie Cubitt	Episode: "The Dancing Men"
1985	Romance on the Orient Express	Stacey	TV film
1985	Oscar	American Beauty	Episode: "Gilded Youth"
1987	Horizon	Elizabeth Watson	Episode: "The Race for the Double Helix"
1987	Dreams Lost, Dreams Found	Jane McAllister	TV film
1987	London Embassy	Flora Domingo-Duncan	Episodes: "The Winfield Wallpaper", "Tomb with a View"
1988	The Comic Strip Presents...	Vanessa	Episode: "The Yob"
1988	A Year in the Life	Cynthia	Episode: "Glory Days"
1988	Heartbeat	Dorothy	Episode: "Where's Solomon When You Need Him?"
1988	Beauty and the Beast	Nancy Tucker	Episodes: "Ozymandias", "A Happy Life"
1988	American Playhouse	Marion Castle	Episode: "The Big Knife"
1989	Men	Claire	Episode: "Baltimore"
1989	Tour of Duty	Jennifer Seymour	Recurring role (seasons 2–3)
1992	Yesterday Today		TV film
1993	The Jackie Thomas Show	Gail Harper	Episode: "Stand Up for Bastards"
1993	Jack's Place	Claudia	Episode: "True Love Ways"
1993	Final Appeal	Fran	TV film
1995	Little Lord Fauntleroy	Mrs. Errol	TV miniseries
1995	Amazing Grace		Episode: "The Fugitive"
1995	Dad, the Angel & Me	Susan Lyons	TV film
1996–1997	Second Noah	Jessie Beckett	Main role
1997	Touched by an Angel	Joanne McNabb	Episode: "Great Expectations"
1998	NYPD Blue	Val Dixon	Episode: "Speak for Yourself, Bruce Clayton"
1998	From the Earth to the Moon	Jan Armstrong	Episode: "Mare Tranquilitatis"
1999	Chicago Hope	Mrs. Dano	Episode: "The Heavens Can Wait"
2002	Impact	Diane Cousins	TV film
