= Ihor Shamo =

Ukrainian composer (1925–1982)

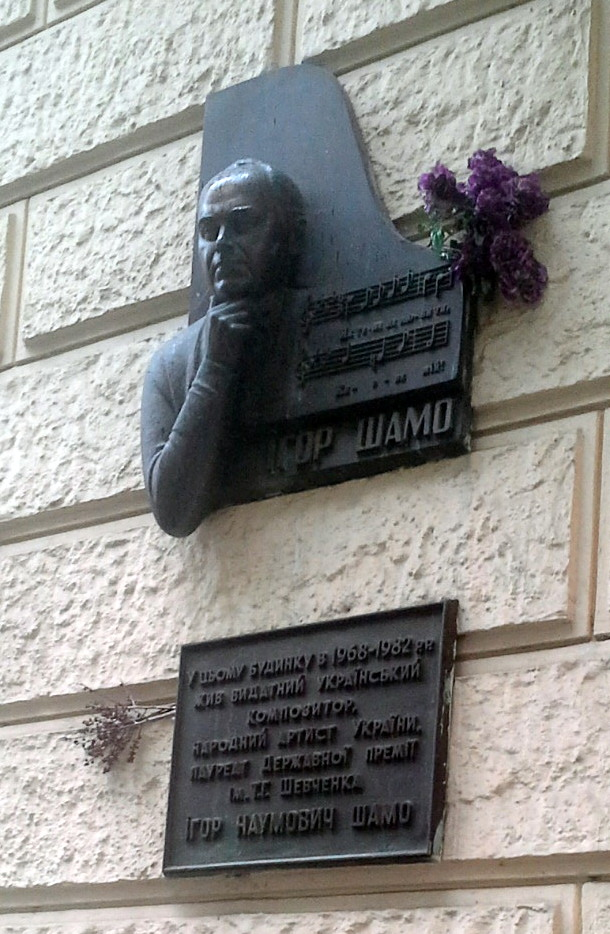
Memorial to the Ukrainian composer Ihor Shamo in Kostolna St., Kyiv, Ukraine

Ihor Naumovich Shamo (Ukrainian: Iгор Наумович Шамо, Russian: Игорь Наумович Шамо, also romanized Igor; 21 February 1925 – 17 August 1982) was a Ukrainian composer, Shevchenko National Prize laureate.

Shamo was born in Kyiv to a family of Jewish origin. He graduated from the Lysenko Music School in Kyiv, where his main subjects were composition and piano, in 1941, and was evacuated in that year to Ufa, where he studied medicine for two years. From 1942 to 1946, he was in the Soviet Army as a medical assistant; when he returned to Kyiv he recommenced his musical studies, graduating from the Kyiv Conservatory in 1951 in the class of Boris Lyatoshinsky. He had joined the Union of Soviet Composers in 1948, and at his graduation played his own Concert-Ballade for piano and orchestra.

His popular song Kyieve Mii (My Kyiv) – then regarded as the "unofficial anthem of the Ukrainian capital" – became the city's official anthem in 2014, and is cited on his memorial on the building where he lived (see picture). His other works include three symphonies, and an opera Yatranskiye Igri, which is unusually scored for a cappella choir and soloists.

== Selected filmography ==
- Maksimka (1953)
- Malva (1957)
- E.A. — Extraordinary Accident (1958)
- Far from the Motherland (1960)
- Flower on the Stone (1962)
