= Something of Value =

1957 film by Richard Brooks

- Theatrical release poster
- Directed by: Richard Brooks
- Screenplay by: Richard Brooks
- Based on: Something of Value; 1955 novel by Robert Ruark
- Produced by: Pandro S. Berman
- Starring: Rock Hudson; Dana Wynter; Sidney Poitier; Wendy Hiller; Juano Hernández; William Marshall
- Cinematography: Russell Harlan
- Edited by: Ferris Webster
- Music by: Miklós Rózsa
- Distributed by: Metro-Goldwyn-Mayer
- Release date: May 10, 1957 (U.S.)
- Running time: 113 minutes
- Country: United States
- Language: English
- Budget: $2,553,000
- Box office: $3,600,000

Something of Value is a 1957 American drama film directed by Richard Brooks and starring Rock Hudson, Dana Wynter, and Sidney Poitier. The film was reissued under the title Africa Ablaze.

The film, based on the book of the same name by Robert Ruark, portrays the Mau Mau uprising in Kenya. It shows the colonial and native African conflict caused by colonialism and differing views on how life should be lived. It stars Rock Hudson as colonial man Peter McKenzie and Sidney Poitier as native Kenyan Kimani Wa Karanja. The two men grew up together but have drifted apart at maturity.

== Plot ==
In British-ruled Kenya in 1945, members of the Kikuyu tribe work for considerate white settler Henry McKenzie. Both in their early twenties, Henry's son Peter and black worker Kimani Wa Karanja are close friends, having been raised as brothers since the death of Henry's wife. One day, when Kimani asks to use a rifle during a lion hunt, Peter's brother-in-law, Jeff Newton, slaps him and reminds him that he cannot have the gun nor can he continue his friendship with Peter. A humiliated Kimani disappears from the camp, but, after being injured when his foot is caught in a trap, is rescued by Peter. Kimani suggests that they must assume the roles of master and serf, but Peter refuses to change their relationship.

Back at the black settlement, Kimani's father Karanja orders the murder of one of the tribe's newborns, which was born feet first, a condition the tribe believes to be a curse. Karanja is then arrested and sentenced to jail. When Henry, Peter, and Kimani visit him there, Karanja gives Henry his sacred stone. Moved by outrage at the injustices against his father, Kimani attends a secret meeting of the Mau Mau, a group of black men planning an insurrection. He is asked by leader Njogu to prove his fidelity by stealing rifles. After one of the Mau Mau kills a black houseboy during the robbery, Kimani, troubled by their methods of achieving freedom, threatens to leave. Njogu tells Kimani he must remain with them because the police will connect him to the crime.

Years later, in 1952, Peter, who now leads safaris to supplement the farm's dwindling income, welcomes Holly Keith, his betrothed, home. Meanwhile, Kimani submits to a Mau Mau oath in which he swears to drive the Europeans from Kenya no matter the cost.

Later, while Peter and Holly are celebrating their wedding night camping on the safari, the Mau Mau pillage the McKenzie farmhouse and murder Jeff and two of his three children. Kimani cannot follow through with killing Jeff's wife Elizabeth and leaves her wounded. Peter and neighbor Joe Matson track down a Mau Mau camp and bomb it. The Mau Mau surrender and are forced into an internment camp where they are tortured for information. Njogu names Kimani as the leader of the attack on the McKenzie home. As ruling British capture many Mau Mau followers, Peter and black worker Lathela search for Kimani. One night at the McKenzie home, Holly is forced to fight when the Mau Mau attack again. Henry then sends Holly and Elizabeth, who is pregnant with Jeff's child, to Nairobi for protection.

Meanwhile, Peter and Lathela find Kimani and his followers in the jungle. Kimani agrees to meet at a hidden spring to discuss the terms of an agreement. Later, Peter discovers that Joe has already left for the spring with armed men. He races there to prevent conflict, but when Kimani and the remaining Mau Mau arrive, Joe and his men shoot at them. Kimani escapes with his infant son into the jungle, where Peter finds him and explains that they were both betrayed. Kimani insists he must kill Peter and, while grabbing for a gun, slides into a Mau Mau pit trap, where bamboo spikes pierce him. Kimani begs Peter to throw his son to him to die in the pit as well, but Peter keeps the child, carrying it home to be raised with Elizabeth's newborn, in hopes that a new generation might resolve the inequities of East Africa.

== Cast ==
- Rock Hudson as Peter McKenzie
- Dana Wynter as Holly Keith McKenzie
- Sidney Poitier as Kimani Wa Karanja
- Wendy Hiller as Elizabeth McKenzie Newton
- Juano Hernández as Njogu
- William Marshall as Leader
- Robert Beatty as Jeff Newton
- Walter Fitzgerald as Henry McKenzie
- Michael Pate as Joe Matson
- Ivan Dixon as Lathela
- Ken Renard as Karanja
- Samadu Jackson as Witch Doctor
- Juanita Moore as Tribal Woman
- Frederick O'Neal as Adam Marenga
- Angela Cartwright as Caroline
- Barbara Foley as Wanjiru

== Production ==
In January 1955, MGM announced they had bought the film rights to the novel by Robert Ruark for $300,000. The novel was published in April. The New York Times wrote of the book that "the explosive impact of Robert Ruark's Something of Value will reverberate for a long time to come on both sides of the Atlantic."

The film was originally announced for Grace Kelly. It was to follow a proposed remake of The Barretts of Wimpole Street. Producer Pandro S. Berman assigned the script to Richard Brooks, who undertook a research trip to Kenya. At one stage British actor Bill Travers, then under contract to MGM, was discussed as a possible lead. Elizabeth Taylor was mentioned as a possible female lead. In May 1956, it was announced Sidney Poitier would play the role of Kimani Wa Karanja and Rock Hudson would be borrowed from Universal to play the lead. Filming began in July.

== Reception ==
According to MGM records, the movie earned $2.1 million in the US and $1.5 million overseas, for a net loss of $410,000. The movie was the sole American entry at the 18th Venice International Film Festival. It was re-released in 1962 with the title Africa Ablaze.

== Sequel ==
Ruark published a sequel to his original novel in 1962 called Uhuru. No film resulted.

== See also ==
- List of American films of 1957
