= White Nights (1957 film) =

1957 film based on short story, directed by Luchino Visconti

Le notti bianche
- Italian: Le notti bianche
- Directed by: Luchino Visconti
- Screenplay by: Suso Cecchi d'Amico; Luchino Visconti
- Based on: White Nights by Fyodor Dostoyevsky
- Produced by: Franco Cristaldi
- Starring: Maria Schell; Marcello Mastroianni; Jean Marais; Clara Calamai
- Cinematography: Giuseppe Rotunno
- Edited by: Mario Serandrei
- Music by: Nino Rota
- Production companies: Cinematografica Associati; Intermondia Films; Vides Cinematografica; Cinecittà
- Distributed by: The Rank Organisation
- Release dates: 6 September 1957 (Venice); 14 November 1957 (Italy); 8 May 1958 (France)
- Running time: 102 minutes
- Country: Italy
- Language: Italian
- Box office: 511,922 admissions (France)

White Nights (Italian: Le notti bianche), is a 1957 romantic melodrama film directed by Luchino Visconti, based on Fyodor Dostoevsky’s 1848 short story of the same name. It was written for the screen by Visconti and Suso Cecchi d'Amico, and stars Maria Schell, Marcello Mastroianni, and Jean Marais. The film received positive reviews from critics and audiences, and won the Silver Lion at the 18th Venice International Film Festival.

== Plot ==
Late one winter night in downtown Livorno, a young man named Mario, who is new in town, sees a young woman named Natalia crying on a small bridge over a canal. When she sees Mario looking at her, Natalia runs away and almost gets struck by a motorcycle. The motorcyclists hit on Natalia, but Mario shoos them away and attempts to strike up a conversation with her. She does not say much, but listens politely, and then says Mario can walk her home. After agreeing to meet Mario the following night, Natalia returns to the bridge.

When Mario spots Natalia the next night, she initially runs away from him, explaining that she did not want him to think she was an easy woman for arranging to meet a strange man. She then explains that she is waiting for someone on the bridge, but invites Mario to keep her company while she waits, and tells her story to him. Both of her parents, separately, ran off, leaving her with her protective, nearly-blind grandmother. When a dashing man rented a room in her grandmother's house, they eventually fell in love, but then he left suddenly, promising to return in one year. The year is up, so, although she hasn't seen or heard from the tenant since he left, Natalia has begun to sneak out at night to wait for him on the bridge.

Mario tells Natalia she is being naive, but she says the tenant is back in town, she just does not want to make the first move. When Mario suggests she write the tenant a letter, she hands one to him that she has already written, and he agrees to deliver it. Natalia goes home, and a moody Mario tears up the letter and throws it in the canal.

In the morning, Mario debates whether he should feel remorse for what he has done before deciding to go out that night to have fun. Walking around town, he sees Natalia, and this time he is the one who runs away. She notices him, however, and, giddy, says she has spent the whole day impatiently waiting until ten o'clock to discover if the tenant will arrive for their rendezvous. Mario invites Natalia to go to a club to pass the time, and they dance until she learns it is past ten, at which point she runs to the bridge and tells Mario to leave so the tenant does not see him with her.

Mario walks off and, after getting beaten up due to a misunderstanding with a prostitute, winds up back by the bridge. Natalia tells him the tenant did not show up, and Mario admits he did not deliver the letter. To his surprise, Natalia thanks Mario for sparing her from being humiliated and says she is ready to forget the tenant. Overjoyed, Mario tells Natalia he loves her, and she responds that she thinks she could grow to love him some day, but asks him to be patient. As they wander around town, it begins to snow, and they both get caught up in the romance of the situation, until they return to the bridge and Natalia recognizes the man standing on it as the tenant.

Natalia runs over to the man and then returns to Mario to tell him that she realizes she still loves the tenant. Mario apologizes for trying to make her doubt her love and thanks her for the moment of happiness she brought him. An ecstatic Natalia walks away with the tenant, and Mario is left to wander the streets alone.

== Cast ==
- Maria Schell as Natalia
- Marcello Mastroianni as Mario
- Jean Marais as the tenant
- Clara Calamai as the prostitute
- Marcella Rovena as the head maid at the rooming house where Mario is staying
- Maria Zanoli as the woman who kicks Natalia out of the chicken coop
- Corrado Pani as the young man on the back of the motorcycle
- Dirk Sanders (credited as Dick Sanders) as the dancer

== Adaptation ==
According to academic Geoffrey Nowell-Smith, "In turning the Dostoevsky story into a film, Visconti got rid of the first-person narration and made the girl less of an innocent and, in fact, at times something of a hysteric and a tease. In the course of these changes, he also made the ending sadder. In the story, the narrator is allowed a little coda, in which he thanks the girl for the moment of happiness she has brought him. In the film, the hero is left alone, befriending the same stray dog he met at the beginning, back at square one, with no sense that the love he briefly felt has transformed him in any way."

== Production ==
Visconti cast Maria Schell after meeting her at a film festival at which he was a juror. Although he originally planned to dub her voice with that of an Italian actress, as was the standard practice at the time for foreign actors in Italian films, he was impressed when she learned all of her dialogue in Italian, and let her loop her own lines. However, French actor Jean Marais was dubbed by Giorgio Albertazzi.

The entire film was shot on a soundstage at Cinecittà Studios in Rome on an elaborate set that recreated the streets, stores, waterways, and monuments of Livorno. To achieve the misty nighttime atmosphere of the film while maintaining a clear view of the actors, Visconti and cinematographer Giuseppe Rotunno, instead of using filters on the camera lenses, hung large rolls of tulle from the ceiling to the ground on the sets and put street lamps just behind the tulle.

== Release ==
=== Critical reception ===
On review aggregator website Rotten Tomatoes, White Nights has an 88% approval rating based on 8 reviews, with an average score of 8.3/10.

=== Accolades ===
Year	Award	Category	Nominee	Result
1957	Venice Film Festival	Golden Lion	Luchino Visconti	Lost to Satyajit Ray for Aparajito
1957	Venice Film Festival	Silver Lion	Luchino Visconti	Won
1958	Cahiers du Cinéma's Top 10 List	Best Film	Luchino Visconti	3rd place
1958	Nastro d'Argento	Best Director	Luchino Visconti	Lost to Federico Fellini for Nights of Cabiria
1958	Nastro d'Argento	Best Producer	Franco Cristaldi	Lost to Dino De Laurentiis for Nights of Cabiria
1958	Nastro d'Argento	Best Screenplay	Luchino Visconti, Suso Cecchi d'Amico	Lost to Ugo Pirro, Elio Petri for We Still Kill the Old Way
1958	Nastro d'Argento	Best Actor	Marcello Mastroianni	Won
1958	Nastro d'Argento	Best Score	Nino Rota	Won
1958	Nastro d'Argento	Best Cinematography	Giuseppe Rotunno	Lost to Gianni Di Venanzo for Il Grido
1958	Nastro d'Argento	Best Production Design	Mario Chiari, Mario Garbuglia	Won
1958	Bambi Award	Best International Actor	Jean Marais	Lost to Tony Curtis for Sweet Smell of Success
1960	Sant Jordi Award	Best Foreign Director	Luchino Visconti	Won
1960	Sant Jordi Award	Best Foreign Screenplay	Luchino Visconti, Suso Cecchi D'Amico	Won

== Legacy ==
The 2008 American film Two Lovers, though not an adaptation, was inspired by the short story as well as Visconti's film.
