= Dzidra Rinkule-Zemzare =

Latvian poet and author

- Born: July 8, 1920; Rīga, Latvia
- Died: November 4, 2007 (aged 87)
- Writing career
- Language: Latvian

Dzidra Rinkule-Zemzare (8 July 1920 – 4 November 2007), was a Latvian poet and children's book author.
