= Fred Zinnemann =

American film director (1907–1997)

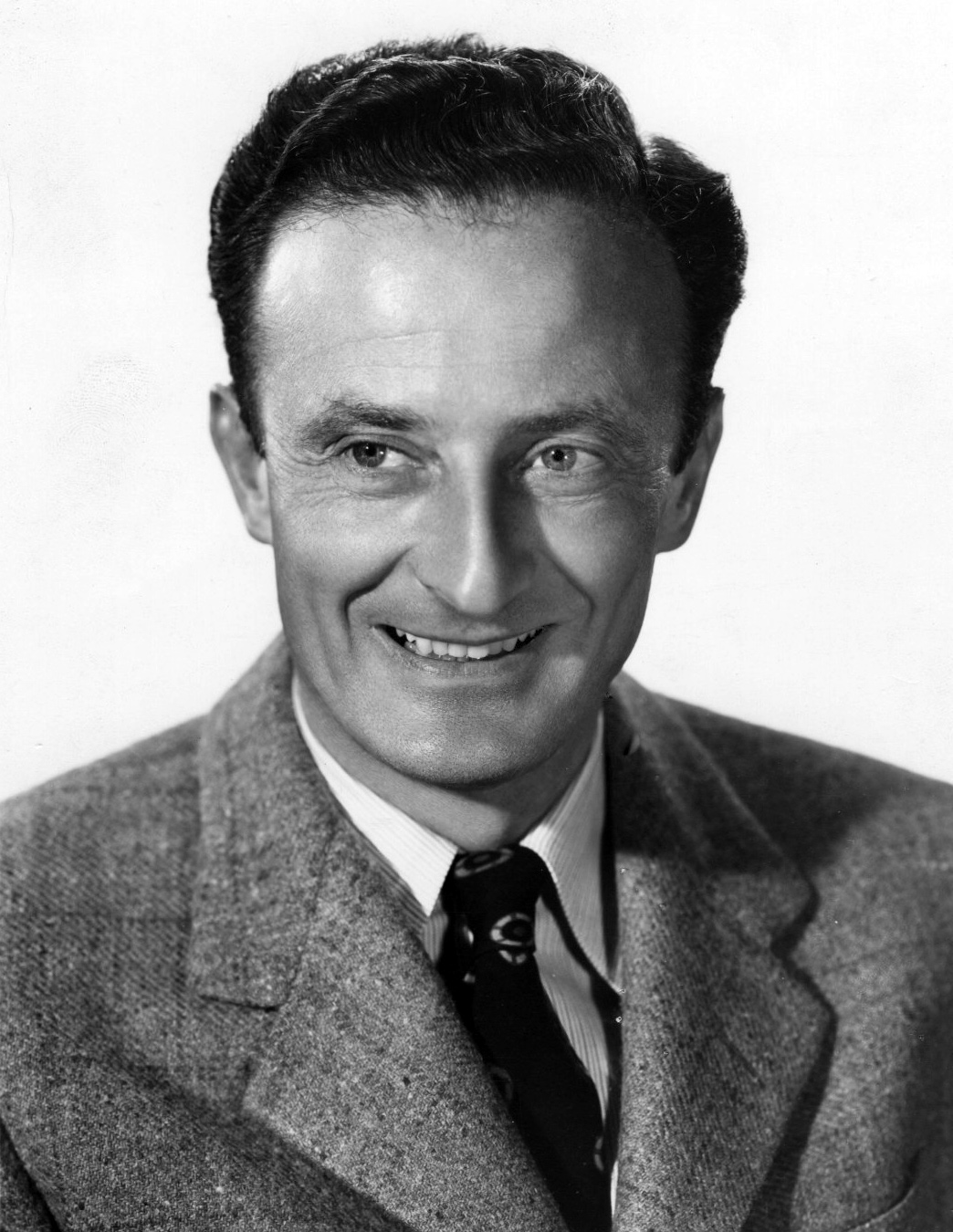
- Zinnemann in the 1940s
- Born: Alfred Zinnemann; April 29, 1907; Rzeszów, Austria-Hungary (now Poland)
- Died: March 14, 1997 (aged 89); London, England
- Education: University of Vienna; École nationale supérieure Louis-Lumière
- Occupations: Film director; producer; screenwriter
- Years active: 1932–1982
- Notable work: High Noon; From Here to Eternity; Oklahoma!; A Man For All Seasons; Julia
- Spouse: Renee Bartlett (m. 1936)
- Children: Tim Zinnemann
- Awards: See list

Alfred Zinnemann (April 29, 1907 – March 14, 1997) was an Austrian and American film director, producer, and screenwriter. Born in Austria-Hungary and educated in France and Germany, Zinnemann began his career in Europe before emigrating to the US, where he specialized in shorts before making 25 feature films during his 50-year career. He won four Academy Awards, both for directing and producing, and made films in a variety of genres including thrillers, westerns, film noir, and stage adaptations.

Among his best-known films were The Search (1948), The Men (1950), High Noon (1952), From Here to Eternity (1953), Oklahoma! (1955), The Nun's Story (1959), The Sundowners (1960), A Man for All Seasons (1966), The Day of the Jackal (1973), and Julia (1977). His films received 65 Oscar nominations, winning 24; Zinnemann himself was nominated for 10, and won Best Director for From Here to Eternity (1953), Best Picture and Best Director for A Man for All Seasons (1966), and Best Documentary, Short Subjects for Benjy (1951).

He directed and introduced a number of stars in their American film debuts, including Marlon Brando, Rod Steiger, Pier Angeli, Julie Harris, Brandon deWilde, Montgomery Clift, Shirley Jones and Meryl Streep. He directed 19 actors to Oscar nominations, including Frank Sinatra, Montgomery Clift, Audrey Hepburn, Glynis Johns, Paul Scofield, Robert Shaw, Wendy Hiller, Jason Robards, Vanessa Redgrave, Jane Fonda, Gary Cooper and Maximilian Schell.

Zinnemann was among the first directors to insist on using authentic locations and for mixing stars with non-professional actors to give his films more realism. Within the film industry, he was considered a maverick for taking risks and thereby creating unique films, with many of his stories being dramas about lone and principled individuals tested by tragic events. Among other honors, Zinnemann received a U.S. Congressional Gold Medal in 1987, a BAFTA Fellowship, and the French Ordre des Arts et des Lettres.

== Early life ==
In Austria, discrimination had been part of life since time immemorial. It was always there, oppressive, often snide, sometimes hostile, seldom violent. It was in the air and one sensed it at all levels, in school, at work and in society. A Jew was an outsider, a threat to the country's culture. Born in Austria-Hungary, and raised as an Austrian, he would still never truly belong.

— Fred Zinnemann

Zinnemann was born in Rzeszów, part of Poland occupied and annexed by Austria-Hungary, the son of Jewish parents Anna (née Feiwel) and Oskar Zinnemann. He had one younger brother.

Zinnemann grew up in Vienna during the First World War, during much of which his father served as a combat medic with the Austro-Hungarian Army on the Eastern Front. Zinnemann later recalled that his father was severely traumatized by his war experiences and often suffered from nightmares.

While growing up in the First Austrian Republic, which had been formed as a rump state of a fallen Empire in 1918 and which he later described as, "a tiny, defeated, impoverished country", Zinnemann wanted to become a musician, but went on to graduate with a law degree from the University of Vienna in 1927.

While studying law, he became drawn to films and convinced his parents to let him study film production in the Third French Republic. After studying for a year at the Ecole Technique de Photographie et Cinématographie in Paris, Zinnemann became a cameraman and found work on a number of films being made at Babelsberg Studio in Berlin, during the Weimar Republic, before emigrating to the United States. Both of Zinnemann's parents, whom he later described as nostalgic for the days of the Habsburg Monarchy, returned to Poland after Anschluss and were later murdered by the Germans during the Holocaust. Writing in Polish, Zinnemann exchanged letters with them up until their death.

== Career as director ==
=== Early career ===
Zinnemann worked in Germany with several other beginners (Billy Wilder and Robert Siodmak also worked with him on the 1929 feature People on Sunday) after he studied filmmaking in France. His penchant for realism and authenticity is evident in his first feature The Wave (1936), shot on location in Mexico with mostly non-professional actors recruited among the locals, which is one of the earliest examples of social realism in narrative film. Earlier in the decade, in fact, Zinnemann had worked with documentarian Robert Flaherty, "probably the greatest single influence on my work as a filmmaker", he said.

Although he was fascinated by the artistic culture of Germany, with its theater, music and films, he was also aware that the country was in a deep economic crisis. He became disenchanted with Berlin after continually seeing decadent ostentation and luxury existing alongside desperate unemployment. The wealthy classes were moving more to the political right and the poor to the left. "Emotion had long since begun to displace reason," he said. As a result of the changing political climate, along with the fact that sound films had arrived in Europe, which was technically unprepared to produce their own, film production throughout Europe slowed dramatically. Zinnemann, then only 21, got his parents' permission to go to America where he hoped filmmaking opportunities would be greater.

He arrived in New York at the end of October 1929, at the time of the Wall Street Crash. Despite the financial panic then beginning, he found New York to be a different cultural environment:

New York was a terrific experience, full of excitement, with a vitality and pace then totally lacking in Europe. It was as though I had just left a continent of zombies and entered a place humming with incredible energy and power.

Shortly after, he took a Greyhound bus to Hollywood. One of Zinnemann's first jobs in Hollywood was as an extra in All Quiet on the Western Front (1930). He said that many of the other extras were former Russian aristocrats and high-ranking officers who fled to America as refugees from the October Revolution in 1917 and the ensuing Red Terror.

He was twenty-two but he said he felt older than the forty-year-olds in Hollywood. But he was jubilant because he was then certain that "this was the place one could breathe free and belong." But after a few years he became disillusioned with the limited talents of Hollywood's elites. His first directorial effort was the Mexican cultural protest film, The Wave, in Alvarado, Mexico. He established residence in North Hollywood with Henwar Rodakiewicz, Gunther von Fritsch and Ned Scott, all fellow contributors to the Mexican project.

=== 1940s ===
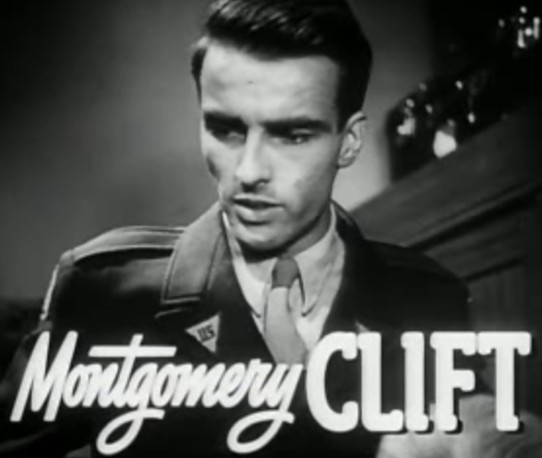
Montgomery Clift in his debut film, The Search (1948)

After some directing success with some short films, he graduated to features in 1942, turning out two B mysteries, Kid Glove Killer and Eyes in the Night before getting his big break with The Seventh Cross (1944), starring Spencer Tracy, which became his first hit. The film was based on Anna Seghers' novel and, while filmed entirely on the MGM backlot, made realistic use of refugee German actors in even the smallest roles. The central character—an escaped prisoner played by Tracy—is seen as comparatively passive and fatalistic. He is, however, the subject of heroic assistance from anti-Nazi Germans. In a sense, the most dynamic character of the film is not the Tracy character but a humble German worker played by Hume Cronyn, who changes from Nazi sympathizer to active opponent of the regime as he aids Tracy.

After World War II, Zinnemann learned that both of his parents had been murdered in the Holocaust. He was frustrated by his studio contract, which dictated that he did not have a choice in directing films like Little Mister Jim (1946) and My Brother Talks to Horses (1947) despite his lack of interest in their subject matter. However, his next film, The Search (1948), won an Oscar for screenwriting and secured his position in the Hollywood establishment. Shot in war-ravaged Germany, the film stars Montgomery Clift in his screen debut as a GI who cares for a lost Czech boy traumatized by the war. It was followed by Act of Violence (1948), a gritty film noir starring Van Heflin as a haunted POW, Robert Ryan as his hot-tempered former friend, Janet Leigh as Heflin's wife, and Mary Astor as a sympathetic prostitute. Zinnemann considered Act of Violence the first project in which he "felt comfortable knowing exactly what I wanted and exactly how to get it."

=== 1950s ===
The Men (1950) stars Marlon Brando as a paraplegic war veteran. It was Brando's first film. Zinnemann filmed many scenes in a California hospital where real patients served as extras. It was followed by Teresa (1951), starring Pier Angeli.

Perhaps Zinnemann's best-known work is High Noon (1952), one of the first 25 American films chosen in 1989 for the National Film Registry. With its psychological and moral examinations of its lawman hero Marshall Will Kane, played by Gary Cooper and its innovative chronology whereby screen time approximated the 80-minute countdown to the confrontational hour, the film broke the mold of the formulaic western. Working closely with cinematographer and longtime friend Floyd Crosby, he shot without filters, giving the landscape a harsh "newsreel" quality that clashed with the more painterly cinematography of John Ford's westerns. During production he established a strong rapport with Gary Cooper, photographing the aging actor in many tight close-ups which showed him sweating, and at one point, even crying on screen.

Screenwriter Carl Foreman apparently intended High Noon to be an allegory of Senator Joseph McCarthy's vendetta against alleged Communists. However, Zinnemann disagreed, insisting, late in life, that the issues in the film, for him, were broader, and were more about conscience and independent, uncompromising fearlessness. He says, "High Noon is "not a Western, as far as I'm concerned; it just happens to be set in the Old West."

Film critic Stephen Prince suggests that the character of Kane actually represents Zinnemann, who tried to create an atmosphere of impending threat on the horizon, a fear of potential "fascism", represented by the gang of killers soon arriving. Zinnemann explained the general context for many of his films: "One of the crucial things today [is] trying to preserve our civilization."

Prince adds that Zinnemann, having learned that both his parents were murdered in the Holocaust, wanted Kane willing to "fight rather than run", unlike everyone else in town. As a result, "Zinnemann allies himself" with the film's hero. Zinnemann explains the theme of the film and its relevance to modern times:

I saw it as a great movie yarn, full of enormously interesting people ... only later did it dawn on me that this was not a regular Western myth. There was something timely – and timeless – about it, something that had a direct bearing on life today. To me it was the story of a man who must make a decision according to his conscience. His town – symbol of a democracy gone soft – faces a horrendous threat to its people's way of life. Determined to resist, and in deep trouble, he moves all over the place looking for support but finding that there is nobody who will help him; each has a reason of his own for not getting involved. In the end, he must meet his chosen fate all by himself, his town's doors and windows firmly locked against him. It is a story that still happens everywhere, every day.

For his screen adaptation of the play The Member of the Wedding (1952), Zinnemann chose Julie Harris as the film's 12-year-old protagonist, although she was by then 26 years old. Two years earlier Harris had created the role on Broadway just as the two other leading actors, Ethel Waters and Brandon deWilde, had.

Zinnemann's next film, From Here to Eternity (1953), based on the novel by James Jones, was nominated for 13 Academy Awards and would go on to win 8, including Best Picture and Best Director. Zinnemann fought hard with producer Harry Cohn to cast Montgomery Clift as the character of Prewitt, although Frank Sinatra, who was at the lowest point of his popularity, cast himself in the role of "Maggio" against Zinnemann's wishes. Sinatra would later win an Oscar for Best Supporting Actor. From Here to Eternity also featured Deborah Kerr, best known for prim and proper roles, as a philandering Army wife. Donna Reed played the role of Alma "Lorene" Burke, a prostitute and mistress of Montgomery Clift's character which earned her an Academy Award for Best Supporting Actress for 1953.

Don Murray and Eva Marie Saint in A Hatful of Rain (1957)

In Oklahoma! (1955), Zinnemann's version of the Rodgers and Hammerstein musical, the wide screen format Todd-AO made its debut, as did the film's young star, Shirley Jones. It was also an expression of Zinnemann's continued faith and optimism about America, with its energy and exuberance.

His next film was A Hatful of Rain (1957), starring Don Murray, Eva Marie Saint and Anthony Franciosa, and was based on the play by Michael V. Gazzo. It is a drama story about a young married man with a secret morphine addiction who tries to quit and suffers through painful withdrawal symptoms. The film was a risk for Zinnemann, since movie depictions of drug addiction and withdrawal were rare in the 1950s.

Zinnemann rounded out the 1950s with The Nun's Story (1959), casting Audrey Hepburn in the role of Sister Luke, a nun who eventually gives up the religious life to join the Belgian resistance in the Second World War. Based on a popular novel by Kathryn Hulme (inspired by the experiences of Marie Louise Habets), the film depicts a young woman's struggles with convent life in Belgium and the Congo. Hepburn, who gave up the chance to play Anne Frank in order to work on The Nun's Story, considered the film to be her best and most personal work. Zinnemann's style of cutting from close-up to close-up was heavily influenced by Carl Theodor Dreyer's The Passion of Joan of Arc (1928), his favorite film. He was grateful that Hepburn was easy to work with:

I have never seen anyone more disciplined, more gracious or more dedicated to her work than Audrey. There was no ego, no asking for extra favors; there was the greatest consideration for her co-workers.

=== 1960s ===
The Sundowners (1960), starring Robert Mitchum and Deborah Kerr as an Australian outback husband and wife, led to more Academy Award nominations, including Best Picture, Best Director, Best Screenplay, Best Actress (Kerr) and Best Supporting Actress (Glynis Johns), but won none. Behold A Pale Horse (1964) was a post-Spanish Civil War epic based on the book Killing a Mouse on Sunday by Emeric Pressburger and starred Gregory Peck, Anthony Quinn and Omar Sharif, but was both a critical and commercial flop; Zinnemann would later admit that the film "didn't really come together."

In 1965 he was a member of the jury at the 4th Moscow International Film Festival.

Zinnemann's fortunes changed once again with A Man for All Seasons (1966), scripted by Robert Bolt from his own play and starring Paul Scofield as Sir Thomas More, portraying him as a man driven by conscience to his ultimate fate. The film went on to win six Academy Awards, including Best Picture, Best Actor (Scofield) and Best Director, Zinnemann's second such Oscar to date. The film was also entered into the 5th Moscow International Film Festival.

After this, Zinnemann was all set to direct an adaptation of Man's Fate for MGM. However, the project was shut down in 1969, and the studio attempted to hold Zinnemann responsible for at least $1 million of the $3.5 million that had already been spent on pre-production. In protest, Zinnemann filed a lawsuit against the studio, and it would be four years before he would make his next film.

=== 1970s ===
By the early 1970s, Zinnemann had been out of work since the cancellation of Man's Fate; he believed it had "marked the end of an era in picture making and the dawn of a new one, when lawyers and accountants began to replace showmen as head of the studios and when a handshake was a handshake no longer." However, Universal then offered him the chance to direct The Day of the Jackal (1973), based on the best-selling suspense novel by Frederick Forsyth. The film starred Edward Fox as an English assassin hired to kill French president Charles de Gaulle, and Michael Lonsdale as the French detective charged with stopping him. Zinnemann was intrigued by the opportunity to direct a film in which the audience would already be able to guess the ending (the Jackal failing his mission), and was pleased when it ultimately became a hit with the public.

The Day of the Jackal was followed four years later by Julia (1977), based on a story in the book Pentimento: A Book of Portraits by Lillian Hellman. The film starred Jane Fonda as a young Hellman and Vanessa Redgrave as her best friend Julia, an American heiress who forsakes the safety and comfort of both her homeland and great wealth to devote her life with fatal consequences to the Austrian Resistance to Nazism. The film was nominated for eleven Academy Awards and won three, for Best Screenplay (Alvin Sargent), Best Supporting Actor (Jason Robards), and Best Supporting Actress (Vanessa Redgrave); Zinnemann thought that Fonda's acting was extraordinary enough to merit consideration for an award as well.

=== 1980s ===
Zinnemann's final film was Five Days One Summer (1982), filmed in Switzerland and based on the short story Maiden, Maiden by Kay Boyle. It starred Sean Connery and Betsy Brantley as a "couple" vacationing in the Alps in the 1930s, and a young Lambert Wilson as a mountain-climbing guide who grows heavily suspicious of their relationship. The film was both a critical and commercial flop, although Zinnemann would be told by various critics in later years that they considered it an underrated achievement. Zinnemann blamed the film's critical and commercial failure for his retirement from filmmaking: "I'm not saying it was a good picture. But there was a degree of viciousness in the reviews. The pleasure some people took in tearing down the film really hurt."

== Final years and death ==
Zinnemann is often regarded as striking a blow against ageism in Hollywood. The apocryphal story goes that in the 1980s, during a meeting with a young Hollywood executive, Zinnemann was surprised to find the executive didn't know who he was, despite having won four Academy Awards, and directing many of Hollywood's biggest films. When the young executive asked Zinnemann to list what he had done in his career, Zinnemann reportedly answered, "Sure. You first." In Hollywood, the story is known as "You First," and is often alluded to when veteran creators find that upstarts are unfamiliar with their work.

Zinnemann insisted, "I've been trying to disown that story for years. It seems to me Billy Wilder told it to me about himself."

Zinnemann died of a heart attack in London, England on March 14, 1997. He was 89 years old. Zinneman's remains were cremated at Kensal Green Cemetery and the cremated remains were collected from the cemetery. His wife, Renee Bartlett died on December 18, 1997.

== Directing style ==
His films are characterized by an unshakable belief in human dignity; a realist aesthetic; a preoccupation with moral and social issues; a warm and sympathetic treatment of character; an expert handling of actors; a meticulous attention to detail; consummate technical artistry; poetic restraint; and deliberately open endings.

— Arthur Nolletti,
film historian

Zinnemann's training in documentary filmmaking and his personal background contributed to his style as a "social realist." With his early films between 1937 and 1942 he began using that technique, and with High Noon in 1952, possibly his finest film, he created the tense atmosphere by coordinating screen time with real time.

Because he started his film career as a cameraman, his movies are strongly oriented toward the visual aspects. He also said that regardless of the size of an actor's part, he spends much time discussing the roles with each actor separately and in depth. "In this way we make sure long before the filming starts that we are on the same wavelength," he says.

Zinnemann's films are mostly dramas about lone and principled individuals tested by tragic events, including High Noon (1952), From Here to Eternity (1953); The Nun's Story (1959); A Man For All Seasons (1966); and Julia (1977). Regarded as a consummate craftsman, Zinnemann traditionally endowed his work with meticulous attention to detail to create realism, and had an intuitive gift for casting and a preoccupation with the moral dilemmas of his characters. His philosophy about directing influenced director Alan Parker:

My mentor was the great director, Fred Zinnemann, whom I used to show all my films to until he died. He said something to me that I always try to keep in my head every time I decide on what film to do next. He told me that making a film was a great privilege, and you should never waste it.

In From Here to Eternity, for example, he effectively added actual newsreel footage of the Japanese attack on Pearl Harbor, which enhanced and dramatized the story. Similarly, in A Hatful of Rain, he used a documentary style to present real life drug addiction in New York City. Zinnemann again incorporated newsreel footage in Behold a Pale Horse, about the Spanish Civil War. The Day of the Jackal, a political thriller about an attempt to assassinate Charles de Gaulle, was shot on location in newsreel style, while Julia placed the characters in authentic settings, as in a suspenseful train journey from Paris to Moscow during World War II. According to one historian, Zinnemann's style "demonstrates the director's sense of psychological realism and his apparent determination to make worthwhile pictures that are nevertheless highly entertaining."

== Filmography ==
=== Feature films ===
Year	Title	Director	Writer
1936	Redes	Yes	Yes
1942	Kid Glove Killer	Yes	No
1942	Eyes in the Night	Yes	No
1944	The Seventh Cross	Yes	No
1946	Little Mister Jim	Yes	No
1947	My Brother Talks to Horses	Yes	No
1948	The Search	Yes	No
1949	Act of Violence	Yes	No
1950	The Men	Yes	No
1951	Teresa	Yes	No
1952	High Noon	Yes	No
1952	The Member of the Wedding	Yes	No
1953	From Here to Eternity	Yes	No
1955	Oklahoma!	Yes	No
1957	A Hatful of Rain	Yes	No
1959	The Nun's Story	Yes	Uncredited
1960	The Sundowners	Yes	No
1964	Behold a Pale Horse	Yes	Uncredited
1966	A Man For All Seasons	Yes	No
1973	The Day of the Jackal	Yes	No
1977	Julia	Yes	No
1982	Five Days One Summer	Yes	No

=== Short films ===
Year	Film	Oscar nominations	Oscar wins
1937	Friend Indeed		
1938	They Live Again		
1938	That Mothers Might Live	1	1
1938	The Story of Doctor Carver		
1939	Weather Wizards		
1939	While America Sleeps		
1939	Help Wanted		
1939	One Against the World		
1939	The Ash Can Fleet		
1939	Forgotten Victory		
1940	Stuffie		
1940	The Great Meddler		
1940	The Old South		
1940	A Way in the Wilderness		
1941	Forbidden Passage	1	
1941	Your Last Act		
1942	The Greenie		
1942	The Lady or the Tiger?		
1951	Benjy (documentary)	1	1

== Unfinished projects ==
Year	Title	Replaced by	Ref.
1943	Marriage Is a Private Affair	Robert Z. Leonard	
1944	The Clock	Vincente Minnelli	
1951	His Majesty O'Keefe	Byron Haskin	
1952	The Young Lions	Edward Dmytryk	
1955	The Old Man and the Sea	John Sturges	
1964	Birch Interval	Delbert Mann	
1964	Hawaii	George Roy Hill	
1964	Who's Afraid of Virginia Woolf?	Mike Nichols	
1965	The Day Custer Fell	—N/a	
1968	Valley of the Dolls	Mark Robson	
1968	The Dybbuk	—N/a	
1969	Man's Fate	—N/a	
1970	Casualties of War	Brian De Palma	
1972	Abelard and Heloise	—N/a	
1975	The French Lieutenant's Woman	Karel Reisz	

== Awards and honours ==
Over the course of his career, Zinnemann received four Academy Awards, two BAFTA Awards, and two Golden Globe Awards.

- Academy Award for Best Short Subject, One-Reel: That Mothers Might Live (1938).
- Golden Globe for Best Film Promoting International Understanding: "The Search" (1948).
- Academy Award for Best Documentary Short Subject: Benjy (1951).
- New York Film Critics Circle Award for Best Director: High Noon (1952).
- Academy Award for Best Director, Directors Guild of America (DGA) Award for Outstanding Directorial Achievement in Motion Pictures: From Here to Eternity (1953).
- New York Film Critics Circle Award for Best Director: The Nun's Story (1959).
- Academy Award for Best Director, New York Film Critics Circle Award for Best Director, and Directors Guild of America (DGA) Award for Outstanding Directorial Achievement in Motion Pictures: A Man for All Seasons (1966).
- D. W. Griffith Award, 1971.
- BAFTA Fellowship, 1977.
- Order of Arts and Letters, France, 1982.
- U.S. Congressional Lifetime Achievement Award, 1987.
- John Huston Award, Artists Right Foundation, 1994.

Accolades for Zinnemann's pictures
Year	Picture	Oscars		BAFTAs		Golden Globes	
Year	Picture	Nominations	Wins	Nominations	Wins	Nominations	Wins
1944	The Seventh Cross	1					
1948	The Search	4	1	1	1		
1950	The Men	1		1			
1951	Teresa	1				1	1
1952	High Noon	7	4			7	4
1952	The Member of the Wedding	1					
1953	From Here to Eternity	13	8	1		2	2
1955	Oklahoma!	4	2				
1957	A Hatful of Rain	1		1		3	
1959	The Nun's Story	8		5	1	5	
1960	The Sundowners	5		3		1	
1966	A Man for All Seasons	8	6	7	7	5	4
1973	The Day of the Jackal	1		7	1	3	
1977	Julia	11	3	10	4	7	2
Total		66	24	36	14	34	13

=== Oscar-related performances ===
Year	Performer	Picture	Result
Best Actor
1949	Montgomery Clift	The Search	Nominated
1953	Gary Cooper	High Noon	Won
1954	Montgomery Clift	From Here to Eternity	Nominated
1954	Burt Lancaster	From Here to Eternity	Nominated
1958	Anthony Franciosa	A Hatful of Rain	Nominated
1967	Paul Scofield	A Man for All Seasons	Won
Best Actress
1953	Julie Harris	The Member of the Wedding	Nominated
1954	Deborah Kerr	From Here to Eternity	Nominated
1960	Audrey Hepburn	The Nun's Story	Nominated
1961	Deborah Kerr	The Sundowners	Nominated
1978	Jane Fonda	Julia	Nominated
Best Supporting Actor
1945	Hume Cronyn	The Seventh Cross	Nominated
1954	Frank Sinatra	From Here to Eternity	Won
1967	Robert Shaw	A Man for All Seasons	Nominated
1978	Jason Robards	Julia	Won
1978	Maximillian Schell	Julia	Nominated
Best Supporting Actress
1954	Donna Reed	From Here to Eternity	Won
1961	Glynis Johns	The Sundowners	Nominated
1967	Wendy Hiller	A Man for All Seasons	Nominated
1978	Vanessa Redgrave	Julia	Won

== Media portrayals ==
Zinnemann (played by Peter James Haworth) is a minor character in the 2006 film Hollywoodland, about the death of actor George Reeves. The film portrays a widely reported urban legend that Reeves' role in From Here to Eternity was reduced after a poor response at early screenings. However, the real Zinnemann always denied this.
