= Malva (1957 film) =

- Directed by: Vladimir Braun
- Written by: Nikolai Kovarskiy
- Based on: Mallow and Two tramp by Maxim Gorky
- Starring: Dzidra Ritenberga; Pavel Usovnichenko; Gennadi Yukhtin; Anatoly Ignatiev; Arkady Tolbuzin
- Cinematography: Vladimir Voitenko
- Music by: Ihor Shamo
- Production company: Dovzhenko Film Studios
- Release date: June 8, 1957
- Running time: 85 min
- Country: Soviet Union
- Language: Russian

Malva (Russian: Мальва) is a 1957 Soviet drama film based on the stories of Maxim Gorky Mallow and Two tramp.

== Plot ==
The history of rivalry father and son from the love of one woman. Once a farmer Basil left his native village, leaving his wife and his son Jacob. For many years he worked in the fishing industry, which, forgetting about family, friends with beautiful fisherwoman Malva and lived a serene life. But grown-up son came to his father. Soon relationships between him and Malva led to conflicts with his father.

== Cast ==
- Dzidra Ritenberga — Malva
- Pavel Usovenichenko — Vasily
- Anatoly Ignatiev — Yakov
- Gennadi Yukhtin — Seryozhka
- Arkady Tolbuzin — clerk
- Ivan Matveev — Stepok

== Awards ==
- Dzidra Ritenberga - winner of the international Film Festival in Venice for Best Actress (1957)
