= Five Days One Summer =

1982 film

- Theatrical release poster
- Directed by: Fred Zinnemann
- Written by: Michael Austin
- Based on: "Maiden, Maiden" by Kay Boyle
- Produced by: Fred Zinnemann
- Starring: Sean Connery; Betsy Brantley; Lambert Wilson; Gérard Buhr; Isabel Dean; Jennifer Hilary; Anna Massey; Sheila Reid
- Cinematography: Giuseppe Rotunno
- Edited by: Stuart Baird
- Music by: Elmer Bernstein
- Production company: The Ladd Company
- Distributed by: Warner Bros.
- Release date: November 12, 1982
- Running time: 108 minutes
- Country: United States
- Language: English
- Budget: $17 million
- Box office: $199,078

Five Days One Summer is a 1982 American romantic drama film produced and directed by Fred Zinnemann and written by Michael Austin, based on the 1929 short story "Maiden, Maiden" by Kay Boyle. Set primarily in the Alps, the story focuses on Douglas Meredith (Sean Connery) and his lover Kate (Betsy Brantley) as they embark on a mountain climbing trip, which unravels their relationship due to Kate's feelings for their mountain guide (Lambert Wilson) as well as a dark secret that looms over the couple.

Five Days One Summer was Zinnemann's final film before his death. It was released in the United States on November 12, 1982, by Warner Bros., and was a commercial and critical failure.

== Plot ==
In 1932, Douglas Meredith, a middle-aged Scottish doctor, is on a mountain climbing trip in the Alps with a young woman, Kate, whom he introduces as his wife. Despite the attention their large age difference garners, Douglas and Kate are deeply in love and keep their romance on full display. They employ Johann Biari, a local resident, as their mountain guide.

Flashbacks reveal that Kate is actually Douglas' niece and they are in a secret incestuous relationship. Kate had been in love with her uncle since she was a little girl, and was despondent when he had to leave to set up his practice in India when she was just a child. Years later, the adult Kate works at her family-owned shipbuilding factory which she and Douglas stand to inherit from her late father, Douglas' brother. As the family reunites to discuss the factory, Kate welcomes her uncle back from India, dismayed he has a new wife, Sarah. Douglas and Kate's close relationship is rekindled; Kate pursues her uncle and Douglas admires his niece's beauty now that she has grown up. When Sarah and Kate's mother leave for a trip to the market, the two succumb to their feelings and begin a sexual affair. Douglas plans a private vacation to the Alps with Kate in the guise of family bonding, hoping to pursue their relationship in secret and despite Sarah's growing suspicions.

Kate and Douglas openly vacation in the Alps as lovers. During a mountain excursion, they encounter the uncovering of a long-dead corpse. It turns out to be Johann's grand-uncle, who never returned from a trip the day before his wedding years ago. His surviving fiancee is now an elderly woman. Johann and Kate both respond to the story compassionately while Douglas seems unaffected. More cracks in their idyllic relationship emerge as Douglas begins pursuing more self-centered interests. He also notices Johann and Kate have developed unspoken feelings for each other. Kate admits to Johann she is not Douglas' wife and he is already married to Sarah. She doesn't disclose they're also relatives. Johann attempts to convince Kate her relationship with Douglas is doomed. Kate begins to have realize their relationship could never be public even if Douglas left Sarah.

Douglas and Johann embark on a dangerous climb to the top of the Maiden mountain. Kate, disillusioned by her uncle's true personality and realising her relationship can't work, writes a letter to Douglas breaking off their relationship. Atop the Maiden, Johann confronts Douglas about being a married man using Kate. Douglas insists his feelings about her are serious. They put aside their differences and start their descent where they're caught in a rock fall which kills Johann. Douglas returns to the town and shares the news with a heartbroken Kate. As Douglas joins Johann's funeral, Kate shares one last embrace with Douglas before she leaves early.

== Cast ==
- Sean Connery as Douglas Meredith
- Betsy Brantley as Kate Meredith
- Lambert Wilson as Johann Biari
- Jennifer Hilary as Sarah Meredith
- Isabel Dean as Kate's Mother
- Gérard Buhr as Brendel
- Anna Massey as Jennifer Pierce
- Sheila Reid as Gillian Pierce

== Production ==
The production team was based in Pontresina for the filming of most of the action sequences. Locations included Piz Palü, Morteratsch Glacier and Monte Disgrazia in the Eastern Swiss Alps. The film's Safety Officer, Hamish MacInnes, included a chapter about the work on location in his book Beyond the Ranges.

German-Swiss-American mountaineer Norman Dyhrenfurth was second unit director and technical advisor for the film.

== Reception ==
Five Days One Summer received negative reviews from critics and was a box-office bomb. It was the final film directed by Fred Zinnemann. He later remarked that "I'm not saying it was a good picture, but there was a degree of viciousness in the reviews. The pleasure some people took in tearing down the film really hurt."
