= Dzidra Ritenberga =

Latvian actress and film director

- Ritenberga in 1958
- Born: 29 August 1928; Dundaga Parish, Latvia
- Died: 9 March 2003 (aged 74); Riga, Latvia
- Education: Jāzeps Vītols Latvian Academy of Music (directing faculty)
- Occupations: Actress; Film director
- Years active: 1948—1990
- Spouse: Yevgeni Urbansky
- Children: 1

Dzidra Ritenberga (29 August 1928 – 9 March 2003) was a Latvian actress and film director. Ritenberga won the best actress award at the 1957 Venice International Film Festival for her performance as Malva in Malva. From 1976 she directed a few films at Riga Film Studio.

== Selected filmography ==
Year	Title	Role	Notes
1957	Malva	Malva	
1970	Crime and Punishment	Luiza Ivanovna	
1970	The Ballad of Bering and His Friends	Catherine I of Russia	
1971	Day by Day	Dzidra Arturovna	TV series
1980	Long Road in the Dunes	Erna	TV series
