= Benjy (film) =

1951 film

- Directed by: Fred Zinnemann
- Produced by: Fred Zinnemann
- Starring: Lee Aaker
- Narrated by: Henry Fonda
- Production company: Los Angeles Orthopaedic Hospital
- Distributed by: Paramount Pictures
- Release date: 1951
- Country: United States
- Language: English

Benjy is a 1951 American short documentary film directed by Fred Zinnemann. It won an Oscar in 1952 for Documentary Short Subject.

== Production ==
Henry Fonda narrates this short film about a boy who was handicapped from birth. An orthopedic pediatrician wants to provide a therapeutic regimen that could cure the child, a scoliosis patient, but first he needs to convince the boy's parents, who have rejected the child because of his disabilities.

Zinnemann and the film's production crew worked gratis on this project, which was originally designed to be used as a fundraiser for the Los Angeles Orthopaedic Hospital.

In his 1992 book An Autobiography, Zinneman noted that Paramount Pictures arranged for the crew on this production, and that the union members connected to the production turned their salaries back to the hospital. Henry Fonda also volunteered his services for the film.

Although the film extensively used dramatized sequences to tell its story, it was successfully entered in the Academy Award category for Best Documentary Short Subject.

== Cast ==
- Lee Aaker as Benjy
- Henry Fonda as Narrator (voice)
