= A Hatful of Rain =

1957 film

- Theatrical release poster
- Directed by: Fred Zinnemann
- Screenplay by: Michael V. Gazzo; Alfred Hayes; Carl Foreman
- Based on: A Hatful of Rain (1955 play) by Michael V. Gazzo
- Produced by: Buddy Adler
- Starring: Eva Marie Saint; Don Murray; Anthony Franciosa; Lloyd Nolan
- Cinematography: Joseph MacDonald
- Edited by: Dorothy Spencer
- Music by: Bernard Herrmann
- Production company: 20th Century Fox
- Distributed by: 20th Century Fox
- Release dates: July 17, 1957 (New York City); August 3, 1957 (Los Angeles)
- Running time: 109 minutes
- Country: United States
- Language: English
- Budget: $1,820,000
- Box office: $1.5 million (US)

A Hatful of Rain is a 1957 American drama film directed by Fred Zinnemann and starring Eva Marie Saint, Don Murray, Anthony Franciosa and Lloyd Nolan. It is adapted by Michael V. Gazzo, Alfred Hayes, and Carl Foreman from Gazzo's 1955 play. The film is about the effects of morphine addiction on a family in New York City. It was released by 20th Century Fox on July 17, 1957.

On release, the film received positive reviews from critics. At the 18th Venice International Film Festival, A Hatful of Rain was nominated for the Golden Lion and Saint won the Volpi Cup for Best Actress and Franciosa won the Volpi Cup for Best Actor. Franciosa was also nominated for the Academy Award and Golden Globe for Best Actor, and the film also received Golden Globe nominations for Best Actress (for Saint) and Best Director.

== Plot ==
In a housing project apartment in New York City, Johnny Pope lives with his pregnant wife Celia and his brother Polo. Johnny is a veteran who recently returned from the Korean War, in which he sustained an injury while surviving for days trapped in a cave. His survival made him a hero in the newspapers, but his ensuing recuperation in a military hospital left him secretly addicted to the painkiller morphine, with Polo his only family member aware of his condition.

Johnny and Polo's father John Sr. arrives in New York from his home in Florida to visit his sons and collect $2,500 that Polo had saved and promised to him whenever he wanted it. John Sr. has just fulfilled his dream of quitting his job and buying his own bar and needs the money to pay for repairs and remodeling. Polo tells his father that he spent the money but refuses to say what he purchased. John Sr. becomes angry and refuses to speak to Polo, continuing his usual pattern of praising Johnny and belittling Polo.

John Sr. expresses his pride in Johnny's war service and that he has married a fine wife, is starting a family and lives in a nice apartment, while Polo is renting a room from his brother, is unmarried and works in a bar that his father considers low-class. John Sr. and Celia do not know that Polo gave the money to Johnny, who spent it all on his $40-a-day drug habit. John Sr. is also unaware that Johnny has lost four jobs in a row because of his habit and that Johnny and Celia are on the verge of divorce because Johnny ignores her and often leaves for hours, sometimes for a full night. Celia thinks that he is seeing another woman, but he is actually seeking drugs, which are becoming harder to find as the police are arresting many dealers.

While John Sr. is visiting, Johnny's dealer "Mother" comes to the Popes' apartment with his henchmen Apples and Church, ready to beat Johnny badly because he owes Mother $500 and has no money to pay. Johnny begs for enough dope to last him until his father returns to Florida the next day, and Mother gives him one dose but warns him that he needs to pay at least $300 by the next day or they will put him in the hospital. Mother gives Johnny a gun and suggests that he commit robbery to acquire the money. After arguing with Celia, Johnny leaves and spends the night walking the streets. He tries to rob several people at gunpoint but is unable to commit the crime. At the apartment, a drunk Polo confesses his love for Celia, who in her loneliness and desperation is almost ready to return his love. Despite their mutual feelings, they fall asleep in separate rooms.

When Johnny returns in the morning, he is feeling withdrawal symptoms and needs to meet a dealer for a fix, but his father expects to spend the day with him. Johnny tries to convince his father to spend the day with Polo instead. but John Sr. does not want to talk to Polo, causing an emotional confrontation. John Sr. finally agrees to attend the football game with Polo. Johnny coerces Polo into driving him to meet the dealer by threatening to throw himself out of the car in traffic, but when Johnny arrives at the meeting place, the dealer is being arrested. Johnny goes into severe withdrawal and begins to hallucinate just as Mother and his gang arrive to collect Johnny's payment. Upon learning that Johnny does not have the money, they give him one dose in exchange for the $12 that Polo has in his wallet and tell Polo to sell his car to cover Johnny's $500 debt. Polo pleads with Johnny to tell Celia that he is a junkie.

The fix temporarily cures Johnny's withdrawal, and he tries to reconcile with Celia by preparing a romantic dinner. However, she tells Johnny that she no longer loves him and wants a divorce. When he confesses that he is a junkie and that his habit has caused his absence and inattention, she reacts supportively. John Sr. and Polo arrive for dinner and Johnny informs his father that he is a junkie and that Polo's $2,500 was spent on drugs for him. His father becomes angry, causing Johnny, who is going into withdrawal again, to flee the apartment. Celia then becomes ill and is rushed to the hospital to avoid losing the baby. When Johnny returns, he is menaced by Mother but is saved by Polo, who pays Mother $500 that he obtained by selling his car. Johnny announces his intention to overcome his habit, even throwing a package of dope back to Mother. John Sr. and Celia return, and Celia takes charge, reassures Johnny and calls the police to bring Johnny to the hospital.

== Cast ==
- Don Murray as Johnny Pope
- Eva Marie Saint as Celia Pope
- Anthony Franciosa as Polo Pope
- Lloyd Nolan as John Pope Sr.
- Henry Silva as "Mother"
- Gerald O'Loughlin as "Church"
- William Hickey as "Apples"
- Art Fleming as Jack
- Emerson Treacy as Wagner

== Original play ==
A Hatful of Rain
- Original language: English
- Written by: Michael V. Gazzo
- Subject: Drug addiction
- Genre: Drama
- Setting: A remodeled apartment on New York's Lower East Side.

Premiere
- Date: November 9, 1955
- Place: Lyceum Theatre; New York City, New York

The film was based on a play written by Michael V. Gazzo, which developed out of an Actors Studio exercise Gazzo was part of. The original Broadway production opened at the Lyceum Theatre on November 9, 1955 and ran for a total of 398 performances.

It was directed by Frank Corsaro, and the opening night cast featured Ben Gazzara (Johnny), Shelley Winters (Celia), Anthony Franciosa (Polo), and Frank Silvera (John Sr.). Replacements over the course of the run included Vivian Blaine (Celia), Steve McQueen (Johnny), and Harry Guardino (Polo).

At the 10th Tony Awards, Ben Gazzara was nominated for Best Actor in a Play and Anthony Franciosa was nominated for Best Featured Actor in a Play. Franciosa also received a Theatre World Award for his performance.

== Production ==
The screenplay for the film was written by Gazzo, Alfred Hayes, and Carl Foreman. Foreman was uncredited on the original release, as he was blacklisted at the time. The Writers Guild of America added his name to the film's credits in 1998, 14 years after his death.

Fred Zinnemann originally intended Don Murray to be cast as Polo, but Murray insisted on playing Johnny, and Anthony Franciosa reprised his stage role. Franciosa and Henry Silva (Mother) were the only actors to appear in both the original play and the film. This was the film debut of William Hickey.

In preparation for the film, Zinnemann and Murray spent time with the NYPD Narcotics unit. He recalled,

"[We] were taken into 'hot' areas in daytime and in the dead of night, able to observe many things and make mental notes which would be of enormous value to us later on.... A most harrowing experience was seeing patients at the corrective hospital at Rikers Island [where] the hard cases were treated."

Filming took place on-location in New York City's Lower East Side, and at the 20th Century Fox studios in Los Angeles. The exteriors of the housing project were filmed at the Alfred E. Smith Houses. The film was shot in CinemaScope despite Zinnemann's objections, as Fox had a mandate to shoot all its productions in the format. Zinnemann recalled,

"[CinemaScope] tended to defeat the director in his choice of the precise point he wanted the audience to look at; instead, the viewers' eyes went roaming over those acres of screen...I remember spending much time inventing large foreground pieces to hide at least one-third of the screen."

The film features music by Bernard Herrmann, who was asked by 20th Century Fox to rescore his prelude for the film as the original was considered to be "terrifying".

== Reception ==
=== Critical response ===
In a contemporary review for The New York Times, critic Bosley Crowther called A Hatful of Rain "a striking, sobering film" and wrote: "The sum of it is a harrowing picture of what it means for a man to be a slave of the dope habit—what it costs in money, in anguish and in hurt to those he loves. ... [T]hey have contrived a tremendously taut and true description of human agony and shame, of solicitude and frustration and the piteousness of tangled love. And it is so directed by Mr. Zinnemann and acted by an excellent cast that every concept and nuance of the story is revealed."

Critic Philip K. Scheuer of the Los Angeles Times wrote: "'A Hatful of Rain' takes a grip on the spectator that gradually grows viselike and never lets go till the fadeout—if then. ... Half reality, half nightmare, it is the best film I have seen about the insidious consequences of drug addiction. But now, Hollywood and heaven willing, I have had it."

=== Awards and nominations ===
Institution	Year	Category	Nominee	Result	Ref.
Academy Awards	1958	Best Actor	Anthony Franciosa	Nominated	
British Academy Film Awards	1958	Best Foreign Actress	Eva Marie Saint	Nominated	
Directors Guild of America	1958	Outstanding Directorial Achievement in Theatrical Feature Film	Fred Zinnemann	Nominated	
Golden Globe Awards	1958	Best Director	Fred Zinnemann	Nominated	
Golden Globe Awards	1958	Best Actor in a Motion Picture – Drama	Anthony Franciosa	Nominated	
Golden Globe Awards	1958	Best Actress in a Motion Picture – Drama	Eva Marie Saint	Nominated	
Nastro d'Argento	1958	Best Foreign Film	Fred Zinnemann	Nominated	
National Board of Review	1957	Top Ten Films	A Hatful of Rain	Won	
New York Film Critics Circle	1957	Best Actress	Eva Marie Saint	Nominated	
Venice Film Festival	1957	Golden Lion	Fred Zinnemann	Nominated	
Venice Film Festival	1957	OCIC Award	Fred Zinnemann	Won	
Venice Film Festival	1957	Pasinetti Award	Fred Zinnemann	Won	
Venice Film Festival	1957	Volpi Cup for Best Actor	Anthony Franciosa	Won	
Venice Film Festival	1957	New Cinema Award for Best Actor	Anthony Franciosa	Won	
Venice Film Festival	1957	New Cinema Award for Best Actress	Eva Marie Saint	Won	

== See also ==
- List of American films of 1957
