= Richard Brooks =

American filmmaker and writer (1912–1992)

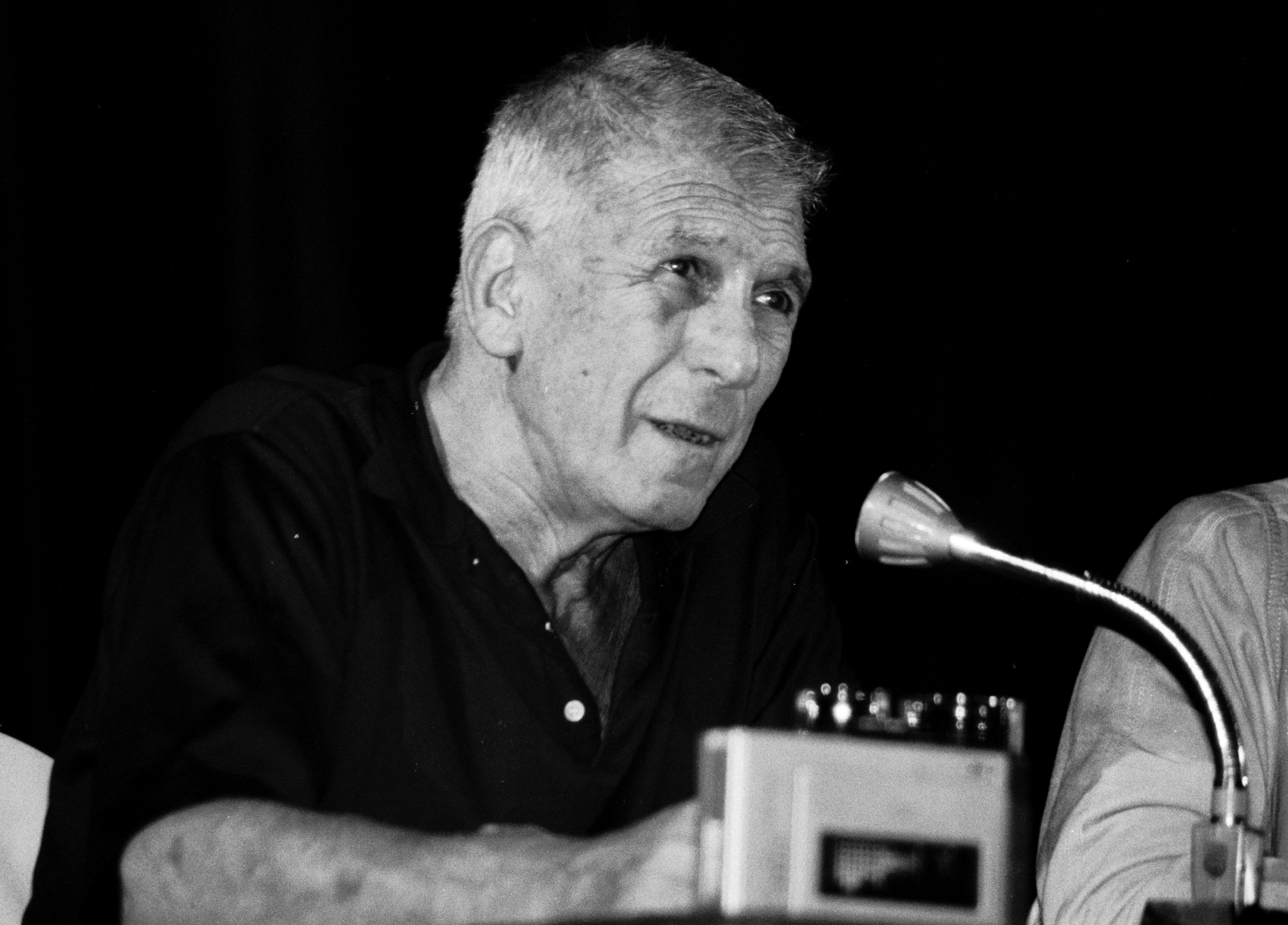
- Brooks in 1986
- Born: Reuben Sax; May 18, 1912; Philadelphia, Pennsylvania, U.S.
- Died: March 11, 1992 (aged 79); Los Angeles, California, U.S.
- Education: Temple University (withdrew)
- Occupations: Film director; screenwriter; novelist
- Years active: 1942–1985
- Spouses: Jean Brooks (m. 1941; div. 1944) Harriette Levin (m. 1946; div. 1957) Jean Simmons (m. 1960; div. 1980)
- Children: 1

Richard Brooks (born Reuben Sax; May 18, 1912 – March 11, 1992) was an American film director, screenwriter, journalist and novelist. He directed 24 feature films between 1950 and 1985, and was known for his portrayals of hard-hitting subject matter, psychologically complex characters, and his independently minded auteurist approach to filmmaking.

His notable works included Blackboard Jungle (1955), Something of Value (1957), The Brothers Karamazov, Cat on a Hot Tin Roof (both 1958), Elmer Gantry (1960), Sweet Bird of Youth (1962), The Professionals (1966), In Cold Blood (1967) and Looking for Mr. Goodbar (1977). He is also known for writing the films noir The Killers (1946), Brute Force (1947), and Key Largo (1948).

Brooks was an eight-time Academy Award nominee, three for Best Director and five for Best Adapted Screenplay, winning once for the latter for Elmer Gantry. He was also a two-time Golden Globe, a six-time Directors Guild of America Award, and a BAFTA Award nominee. For his contributions to the film industry, Brooks has a star on the Hollywood Walk of Fame.

== Early life ==
Brooks was born Reuben Sax in Philadelphia to Russian Jewish immigrants Hyman and Esther Sax. His parents were married teenagers when they immigrated to the US in 1908. They found employment in Philadelphia's textile and clothing industry. Reuben, their only child, was born in 1912. He attended public schools Joseph Leidy Elementary, Mayer Sulzberger Junior High School and West Philadelphia High School, graduating from the latter in 1929.

Sax took classes at Temple University for two years, studying journalism and playing on the school's baseball team. He dropped out and left home when he discovered that his parents were going into debt to pay for his tuition. He rode freight trains around the East and Midwest for a period of time, eventually returning to Philadelphia to seek work as a newspaper reporter. At some point in the 1930s, during the Great Depression, Sax began using the name Richard Brooks professionally. He changed his name legally in 1943.

== Career ==
=== 1938–1949: Early career ===
Brooks wrote sports for the Philadelphia Record and later joined the staff of the Atlantic City Press-Union. He moved to New York to work for the World-Telegram; shortly afterward he took a job with radio station WNEW for a larger paycheck. As a newsman for the station, he reported and read stories on the air and provided commentary. Brooks also began writing plays in 1938 and tried directing for Long Island's Mill Pond Theater in 1940. A falling out with his theater colleagues that summer led him to drive to Los Angeles on a whim, hoping to find work in the film industry. He also may have been trying to escape a marriage; a legal document indicates he was married at least part of the time he lived in New York.

He did not find film work but was hired by the NBC affiliate to write original stories and read them for a daily fifteen-minute broadcast called Sidestreet Vignettes. His marriage, in 1941, to Jeanne Kelly, an actress at Universal Studios, may have helped to open the door to writing for the studio. He contributed dialogue to a few films and wrote two screenplays for the popular actress Maria Montez, known as the "Queen of Technicolor." With no prospect of moving into more prestigious productions, he quit Universal and joined the U.S. Marine Corps in 1943 during World War II.

Brooks never served overseas during the war, instead working in the Marine Corps film unit at Quantico, Virginia, and at times at Camp Pendleton, California. In his two years in uniform he learned more about the basics of filmmaking, including writing and editing documentaries. He also found time to write a novel, The Brick Foxhole, a searing portrait of some stateside soldiers who were tainted by religious and racial bigotry, and opposed to homosexuals. In 1944 he divorced his wife, then known in films as Jean Brooks. Later he said he had been a self-centered husband and unsuitable for what she needed.

His book was published in 1945 to favorable reviews. It was adapted as the film Crossfire (1947) with the homosexual element removed. It was the first major Hollywood film to deal with anti-Semitism, receiving an Oscar nomination. The novel drew the attention of independent producer Mark Hellinger, who hired Brooks as a screenwriter after he left the Marines.

Working for Hellinger brought Brooks back to the film industry and led to a long friendship with actor Humphrey Bogart, a close friend of the producer. Brooks provided an uncredited screen story for The Killers (1946), which introduced actor Burt Lancaster. He wrote the scripts for two other Hellinger films, notably Brute Force (1947), also starring Lancaster. After Hellinger died suddenly in 1947, Brooks wrote screenplays for three Warner Brothers films, including Key Largo (1948), starring Bogart and wife Lauren Bacall and directed and co-written by John Huston, another Brooks mentor. Huston and Brooks had both worked together previously in the uncredited rewrite for The Killers, and Huston would be the only co-writer Brooks ever had. While filming Key Largo, Huston allowed Brooks to be on the Key Largo set during shooting, so that he could learn more about directing a Hollywood film.

Brooks wrote two more novels shortly after the war, The Boiling Point (1948) and The Producer (1951), a thinly disguised portrait of Mark Hellinger. It may also have contained autobiographical elements about Brooks. In 1946 he married again, to Harriette Levin, who had no apparent connection to the film industry. Their marriage lasted until 1957, when she sought a default divorce.

=== 1950–1959: Breakthrough at MGM ===
Richard Brooks on set at MGM studios, 1950s

Success as a screenwriter with Hellinger and Warner Brothers led Brooks to a contract with MGM and the promise of a chance to direct. He wrote two screenplays for the studio before he was given the opportunity. His first film as writer and director, Crisis (1950), starred Cary Grant as a brain surgeon forced to save the life of a South American dictator, played by José Ferrer. His second film, The Light Touch (1951), an art-theft caper film starring Stewart Granger, was shot in Italy. Brooks recounted useful advice he received just before his directorial debut from cinematographer Karl Freund while speaking at the American Film Institute. Freund gave Brooks reels of 16mm film, calling them "Lesson Number One." When Brooks watched the reels at home, he saw that they were pornography. The next day, Freund explained: "I produced them. My pictures, 1922. Many times you will be wondering, do you put the camera here, or up here, or down here? Maybe you make the scene a little bigger, or a little smaller. Lesson Number One. Get to the fucking point."

Brooks came into his own when he directed an original screenplay, Deadline – U.S.A. (1952), for 20th Century-Fox, starring his friend Humphrey Bogart. Based on the closing of the New York World, the film was part gangster picture, part newspaper drama. At its core was an issue Brooks cared about: the consolidation of the newspaper industry and its effect on the diversity of voices in the press. The film remains one of the more highly regarded dramas about American newspapers. Brooks directed four more films before achieving an unqualified hit with Blackboard Jungle (1955) starring Glenn Ford. Based on a best-seller by Evan Hunter, the film was shocking for its time in its presentation of juvenile delinquency. It also offered a career-making supporting role for a young black actor, Sidney Poitier, and early roles for actors Vic Morrow, Jamie Farr and Paul Mazursky. Brooks chose to begin and end the film with the song "Rock Around the Clock", bringing rock 'n' roll to a major Hollywood production for the first time and sparking a No. 1 hit for Bill Haley and the Comets. Blackboard Jungle was nominated for an Oscar for its screenplay, and was MGM's top moneymaker that year.

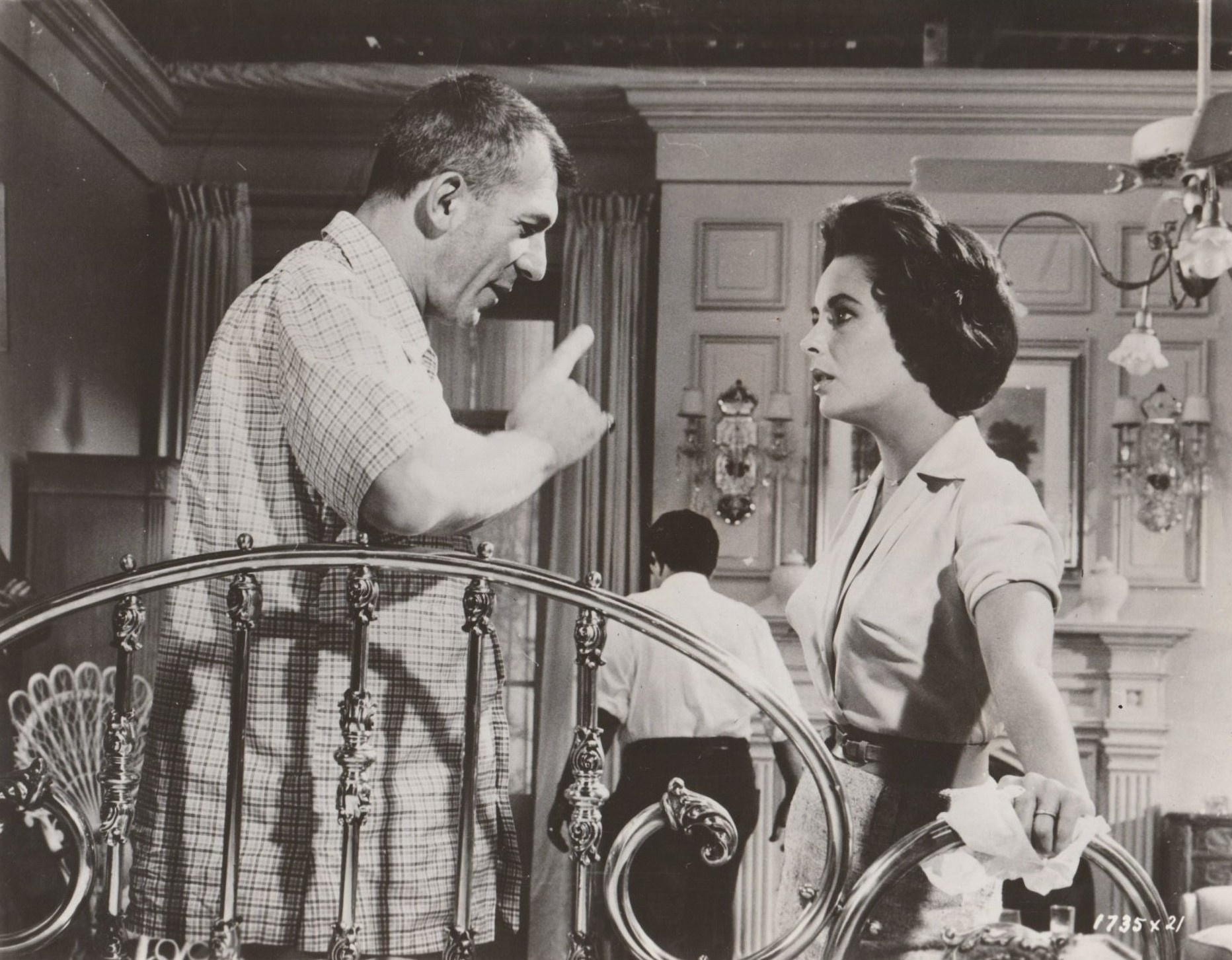
Brooks and Elizabeth Taylor on the set of Cat on a Hot Tin Roof (1958)

In 1955, Brooks was one of four American auteur filmmakers named as "rebels" by the French magazine Cahiers du Cinéma. Box-office success was what gave the writer/director more freedom at MGM, but Brooks also recognized that he would never have complete control of his films while under contract. He determined to avoid writing original screenplays and focused on adaptations of best-sellers or classic novels. He later noted that adapting a novel gave him a head start on developing the story structure required for a screenplay. He spent the rest of the decade at MGM, where his most notable film was an adaptation of Tennessee Williams's sexually charged play Cat on a Hot Tin Roof (1958). A huge hit for MGM – it drew more money and a larger audience than any other film Brooks ever directed – the film was a high point in the career of Elizabeth Taylor and made a star of Paul Newman. It brought Brooks his first Oscar nomination for directing and the first Best Picture nomination in his directorial career.

=== 1960–1985: Work post-MGM ===
Brooks and Peter O'Toole on Lord Jim (1965) set in Cambodia

Brooks spent the last third of his film career working in relative independence. In 1958, he signed a non-exclusive, seven-year writer-director deal with Columbia Pictures that was to earn him over $1 million. He followed the success of Cat on a Hot Tin Roof with an independent production for United Artists of Elmer Gantry (1960), based on the novel by Sinclair Lewis. The story of a phony preacher, played by Burt Lancaster, and a sincere revivalist, played by Jean Simmons, was edgy for the time. As it had for Blackboard Jungle and Cat on a Hot Tin Roof, controversy accompanied the film's release and helped bring people to theaters. The movie received five Academy Award nominations, including one for best picture, and won Oscars for Brooks' screenplay, Lancaster as lead actor and for Shirley Jones as supporting actress.

Brooks adapted and directed another Tennessee Williams play, Sweet Bird of Youth (1962). Ed Begley won a Best Supporting Oscar for his role in the film. While popular and well-received critically, the MGM production did not duplicate the success of the previous Williams film. A dream project followed, an adaptation for Columbia Pictures of Joseph Conrad's Lord Jim (1965), but the lavish film proved to be a misfire at the box office and with most critics. Brooks had spent years writing the script and planning the most expensive project of his career. He had assembled a stellar cast led by Peter O'Toole, Eli Wallach, Jack Hawkins, Paul Lukas, and James Mason. While beautifully photographed in Hong Kong and Southeast Asia by Freddie Young and scored by Bronisław Kaper, Lord Jim did not find the audience that had made David Lean's epics Lawrence of Arabia and Doctor Zhivago such notable hits of the 1960s.

To recover professionally from the failure of Lord Jim, Brooks surprised Hollywood by choosing to adapt a minor western novel about a wealthy husband who hires mercenaries to rescue his kidnapped wife from Mexican bandits. Brooks worked quickly and within a year released The Professionals (1966), which became Columbia's biggest hit that year. The film was made through Brooks and Al Horwits' new film production company, Pax Enterprises, Inc. The slick crowd-pleaser starred Burt Lancaster, Lee Marvin, Robert Ryan and Woody Strode as "the professionals" with Jack Palance as the bandit leader and Claudia Cardinale as the kidnapped wife. The film received Oscar nominations for Brooks' screenplay and direction, and for Conrad Hall's cinematography. It has been lauded as one of the most entertaining westerns ever filmed.

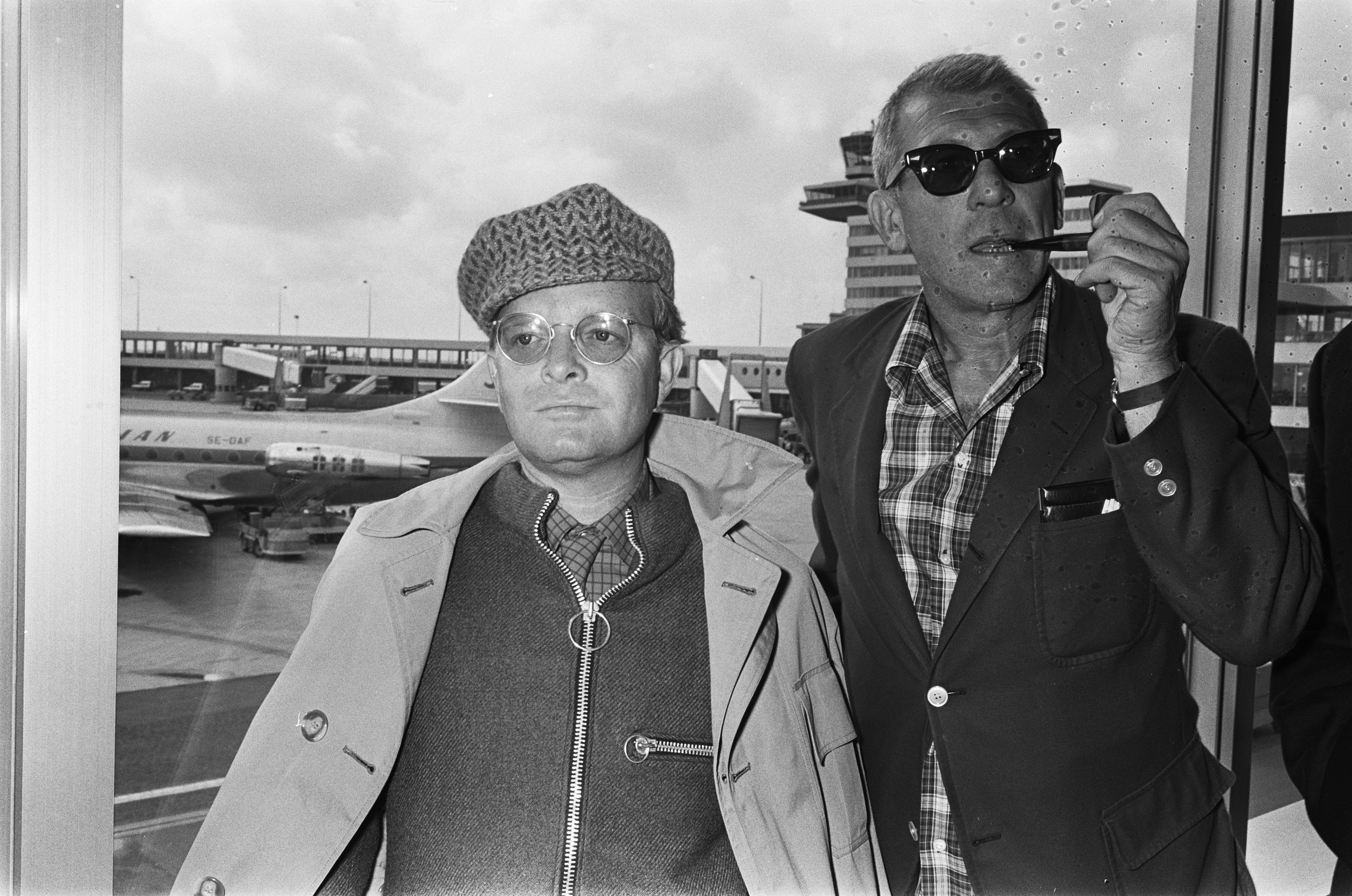
Writer Truman Capote and Brooks in 1968

Brooks landed the property of the decade when author Truman Capote selected him to adapt his best-selling book In Cold Blood. Once again rejecting the methodical pace that had slowed him with other productions, Brooks worked quickly to adapt the "nonfiction novel," as Capote called it. As a reporter, Brooks also conducted his own research into the murders of four members of a Kansas farm family and the lives of the two drifters responsible for the crime. Brooks rejected Columbia's suggestion that he hire stars to play the killers and instead cast two relative unknowns, Scott Wilson and Robert Blake. He resisted the studio on another point, shooting the film in black and white rather than color because he thought it was a more frightening medium. He used locations where the events occurred, including the house where the family had been killed. Again produced through Pax Enterprises, In Cold Blood had a documentary style and was considered among the films of the mid-1960s that ushered in a more mature Hollywood style. Brooks received double Oscar nominations; cinematographer Conrad Hall and composer Quincy Jones also were nominated.

The Professionals and In Cold Blood marked the apex of Brooks' career. In the two decades that followed, he wrote and directed just six more films. Of note was The Happy Ending (1969), also made through Pax Enterprises. From his original screenplay about a woman dealing with disappointments in her marriage and her life, it was the kind of low-key personal film more likely to come from Europe than an American director. The film earned an Oscar nomination for star Jean Simmons. (Her own marriage to Brooks ended in divorce in 1980.) In 1972 Brooks was hired by Columbia Pictures to direct First Blood, with Bette Davis to be cast as a psychiatrist and either Lee Marvin or Burt Lancaster to be cast as Sheriff Will Teasle. Brooks intended the film to be a commentary on the perceptions of veterans from both World War II and the Vietnam War. He also intended to make Teasle a more sympathetic character, who at the end of the film would have ordered his men to drop their guns to try to reason with John Rambo before Rambo was shot by unknown gunman. The film was cancelled because the Vietnam War had not ended, and the rights were sold to Warner Bros. Pictures.

Bite the Bullet (1975) was Brooks' return to the western and his final film made through Pax Enterprises. He based his original screenplay on the endurance horse races popular at the turn of the century. In 1977, he released another controversial film, an adaptation of Judith Rossner's 1975 novel Looking for Mr. Goodbar. Goodbar starred Diane Keaton as a Catholic school teacher who searches for sexual satisfaction in singles bars. Brooks made the film on a tight budget, and its frank treatment of sex and its horrific storyline brought praise and condemnation and sold tickets. He ended his career with Wrong Is Right (1982), a satire about the news media and world unrest starring Sean Connery, and a gambling addiction film with Ryan O'Neal and Catherine Hicks in Fever Pitch (1985). Fever Pitch featured a story about a renowned Los Angeles sportswriter who becomes a sports gambling addict. Brooks himself had been a sportswriter when a young man. Both movies were critical and commercial failures. Brooks tried developing other projects in the last years of his life. He suffered from heart ailments and a stroke before dying at his home in 1992 at the age of 79.

== Personal life ==
=== Marriages and family ===
In 1960, he married Jean Simmons, after her divorce from Stewart Granger. Brooks helped to raise Tracy, Simmons' daughter by Granger. The couple had another daughter, Kate, together in 1961. They separated in 1977 and were legally divorced in 1980. Previously, Brooks had been married for 11 years to Harriette Levin, a relationship that also ended in divorce.

=== Reputation ===
Brooks hated bigotry, which was a central theme of his novel The Brick Foxhole, his co-written screenplay for Storm Warning (1951), and his first western, The Last Hunt (1956). Racial division and reconciliation was also at the heart of Something of Value (1957). He saw Blackboard Jungle as encouraging teachers to continue striving to help their students and as reassuring them that they can make a difference. Opposed to the death penalty, he used In Cold Blood to suggest that executing criminals solves nothing and only creates more violence.

While he worked in the studio system for most of the 1940s and 1950s, Brooks often clashed with studio policies about the look and feel of films and the stories they presented. He also chafed against the Production Code's limitations on subject matter and expression. His goal as a filmmaker was total control of a production, and he achieved that with most films after the success of Cat on a Hot Tin Roof. The failure of Lord Jim threatened that independence. Brooks responded by becoming a fast and efficient filmmaker, operating with a tight budget and often forgoing a high up-front salary in exchange for a guarantee of control.

Brooks was developing a reputation as a hard-driving, difficult and perpetually angry man as early as his tenure with radio station WNEW in the late 1930s. He was not averse to quitting a job when in conflict with those in charge—as he did while directing at the Mill Pond Theater in 1940 and writing for Universal in 1943. At MGM he was known for almost daily eruptions of anger, often aimed at his crew and sometimes at his cast. That did not change even after he was the producer of his films, and he was known throughout the industry as a talented filmmaker yet a difficult man to deal with. Debbie Reynolds recounts that, while as a young and relatively inexperienced actress filming The Catered Affair (1956), Brooks hit her in the face and had to be pulled away from further assault by the assistant director. Later during filming, a heavy piece of equipment fell on his foot, breaking it, and the crew were noticeably slow in removing it which Reynolds attests to a general dislike of the director.

Brooks was much the same way in his personal life. He readily acknowledged that he was a trying husband and that his work was the most important activity in his life. He was not interested in Hollywood's social scene, preferring to entertain guests at his home with tennis and movies when he wasn't working on screenplays or other projects. Yet his wife Jean Simmons found him to be a humorous, stimulating husband and a loving father to their daughters. But from all accounts, he was a "tough as nails" father as well.

=== Death ===
Surrounded by family (Jean Simmons and daughters) and longtime friend, actor Gene Kelly, Brooks died from congestive heart failure in 1992 at his house in Coldwater Canyon in Studio City, California. He was interred in the Hillside Memorial Park Cemetery in Culver City, California, a few steps away from the graves of his parents. On his vault was placed a plaque inscribed, "First comes the word. . .". The quote was chosen by his step-daughter, film editor Tracy Granger, as Brooks always identified most strongly as a writer.

After his death, Brooks' papers were donated to the Margaret Herrick Library and his film collection was donated to the Academy Film Archive. The Academy Film Archive preserved Lord Jim in 2000 and various home movies made by Richard Brooks in 2009 and 2016.

== Legacy ==
Brooks was one of the relatively few filmmakers whose careers bridged the transition from the classic studio system to the independent productions that marked the 1960s and beyond. He was also among the postwar writer-directors who made some of their best films as they struggled to break free of industry censorship. His legacy is that of a filmmaker who sought independence in a collaborative art and tried to bring his own vision to the screen.

Brooks expressed his concept when he reportedly said to his assembled cast and crew on the first day of shooting Looking for Mr. Goodbar: "I'm sure that all of you have your own ideas about what kind of contribution you can make to this film, what you can do to improve it or make it better. Keep it to yourself. It's my fucking movie and I'm going to make it my way!"

Conversely, his friend, the film historian Richard Schickel, wrote that the collaborative nature of the movie business was "perhaps the only thing he idolized."

"I love the movies," Richard said. "I love making them and preparing for them and getting them done." Above all, he loved the people who made them. "And it's people who make movies--not buildings. not logos." From this passion he took a kind of consolation for whatever failures might occur to him. "They're going to break your heart a hundred times, over and over again as you... make a movie. But if you love your job it's going to come out okay."

For his contribution to the motion picture industry, Brooks has a star on the Hollywood Walk of Fame at 6422 Hollywood Blvd, between N. Cahuenga Boulevard and Wilcox Avenue.

== Filmography ==
Year	Title	Director	Writer	Studio	Ref.
1950	Crisis	Yes	Yes	Metro-Goldwyn-Mayer	
1951	The Light Touch	Yes	Yes	Metro-Goldwyn-Mayer	
1952	Deadline – U.S.A.	Yes	Yes	20th Century Fox	
1953	Battle Circus	Yes	Yes	Metro-Goldwyn-Mayer	
1953	Take the High Ground!	Yes	No	Metro-Goldwyn-Mayer	
1954	Flame and the Flesh	Yes	No	Metro-Goldwyn-Mayer	
1954	The Last Time I Saw Paris	Yes	Yes	Metro-Goldwyn-Mayer	
1955	Blackboard Jungle	Yes	Yes	Metro-Goldwyn-Mayer	
1956	The Last Hunt	Yes	Yes	Metro-Goldwyn-Mayer	
1956	The Catered Affair	Yes	No	Metro-Goldwyn-Mayer	
1957	Something of Value	Yes	Yes	Metro-Goldwyn-Mayer	
1958	The Brothers Karamazov	Yes	Yes	Metro-Goldwyn-Mayer	
1958	Cat on a Hot Tin Roof	Yes	Yes	Metro-Goldwyn-Mayer	
1960	Elmer Gantry	Yes	Yes	Elmer Gantry Productions / United Artists	
1962	Sweet Bird of Youth	Yes	Yes	Metro-Goldwyn-Mayer	
1965	Lord Jim	Yes	Yes	Columbia	
1966	The Professionals	Yes	Yes	Columbia	
1967	In Cold Blood	Yes	Yes	Columbia	
1969	The Happy Ending	Yes	Yes	United Artists	
1971	$	Yes	Yes	Columbia	
1975	Bite the Bullet	Yes	Yes	Columbia	
1977	Looking For Mr. Goodbar	Yes	Yes	Paramount	
1982	Wrong Is Right	Yes	Yes	Columbia	
1985	Fever Pitch	Yes	Yes	Metro-Goldwyn-Mayer	

=== Writing only ===
Year	Title	Director	Studio	Other notes	Ref.
1942	Men of Texas	Ray Enright	Universal Pictures		
1942	Sin Town	Ray Enright	Universal Pictures		
1943	Don Winslow of the Coast Guard	Lewis D. Collins; Ray Taylor	Universal Pictures	Additional dialogue	
1943	White Savage	Arthur Lubin	Universal Pictures		
1944	My Best Gal	Anthony Mann	Republic Pictures		
1944	Cobra Woman	Robert Siodmak	Universal Pictures		
1946	The Killers	Robert Siodmak	Universal Pictures	Uncredited	
1946	Swell Guy	Frank Tuttle	Universal Pictures		
1947	Brute Force	Jules Dassin	Universal Pictures		
1947	Crossfire	Edward Dmytryk	RKO	Original Story	
1948	To the Victor	Delmer Daves	Warner Bros.		
1948	Key Largo	John Huston	Warner Bros.		
1949	Any Number Can Play	Mervyn LeRoy	Metro-Goldwyn-Mayer		
1950	Storm Warning	Stuart Heisler	Warner Bros.		
1950	Mystery Street	John Sturges	Metro-Goldwyn-Mayer		

== Awards and nominations ==
Institution	Year	Category	Project	Result	Ref.
Academy Awards	1955	Best Screenplay	Blackboard Jungle	Nominated	
Academy Awards	1958	Best Director	Cat on a Hot Tin Roof	Nominated	
Academy Awards	1958	Best Adapted Screenplay	Cat on a Hot Tin Roof	Nominated	
Academy Awards	1960	Best Adapted Screenplay	Elmer Gantry	Won	
Academy Awards	1966	Best Director	The Professionals	Nominated	
Academy Awards	1966	Best Adapted Screenplay	The Professionals	Nominated	
Academy Awards	1967	Best Director	In Cold Blood	Nominated	
Academy Awards	1967	Best Adapted Screenplay	In Cold Blood	Nominated	
BAFTA Awards	1961	Best Film from Any Source	Elmer Gantry	Nominated	
Cahiers du Cinéma	1961	Annual Top 10 Lists	Elmer Gantry	9th place	
Cannes Film Festival	1958	Palme d'Or	The Brothers Karamazov	Nominated	
David di Donatello	1968	Best Foreign Director	In Cold Blood	Won	
Directors Guild of America	1956	Outstanding Directorial Achievement in Theatrical Feature Film	Blackboard Jungle	Nominated	
Directors Guild of America	1959	Outstanding Directorial Achievement in Theatrical Feature Film	The Brothers Karamazov	Nominated	
Directors Guild of America	1959	Outstanding Directorial Achievement in Theatrical Feature Film	Cat on a Hot Tin Roof	Nominated	
Directors Guild of America	1961	Outstanding Directorial Achievement in Theatrical Feature Film	Elmer Gantry	Nominated	
Directors Guild of America	1967	Outstanding Directorial Achievement in Theatrical Feature Film	The Professionals	Nominated	
Directors Guild of America	1968	Outstanding Directorial Achievement in Theatrical Feature Film	In Cold Blood	Nominated	
Directors Guild of America	1990	Preston Sturges Award	—N/a	Won	
Edgar Awards	1948	Best Motion Picture Screenplay	Crossfire	Won	
Edgar Awards	1968	Best Motion Picture Screenplay	In Cold Blood	Nominated	
Golden Globe Awards	1958	Best Director	Cat on a Hot Tin Roof	Nominated	
Golden Globe Awards	1960	Best Director	Elmer Gantry	Nominated	
Golden Raspberry Awards	1986	Worst Director	Fever Pitch	Nominated	
Golden Raspberry Awards	1986	Worst Screenplay	Fever Pitch	Nominated	
Karlovy Vary International Film Festival	1968	Crystal Globe	In Cold Blood	Nominated	
National Board of Review	1967	Best Director	In Cold Blood	Won	
New York Film Critics Circle	1958	Best Director	Cat on a Hot Tin Roof	Nominated	
New York Film Critics Circle	1958	Best Director	The Brothers Karamazov	Nominated	
Valladolid International Film Festival	1968	Best Film	Elmer Gantry	Nominated	
Venice Film Festival	1957	Golden Lion	Something of Value	Nominated	
Venice Film Festival	1957	San Giorgio Prize	Something of Value	Won	
Writers Guild of America	1949	Best Written American Drama	Key Largo	Nominated	
Writers Guild of America	1956	Best Written American Drama	Blackboard Jungle	Nominated	
Writers Guild of America	1959	Best Written American Drama	Cat on a Hot Tin Roof	Nominated	
Writers Guild of America	1961	Best Written American Drama	Elmer Gantry	Won	
Writers Guild of America	1967	Laurel Award	—N/a	Won	
Writers Guild of America	1967	Best Written American Drama	The Professionals	Nominated	
Writers Guild of America	1968	Best Written American Drama	In Cold Blood	Nominated	
Writers Guild of America	1978	Best Drama Adapted from Another Medium	Looking For Mr. Goodbar	Nominated	

Awards and nominations received by Brooks' directed films
Year	Title	Academy Awards		BAFTAs		Golden Globes	
Year	Title	Nominations	Wins	Nominations	Wins	Nominations	Wins
1953	Take the High Ground	1					
1955	Blackboard Jungle	4					
1958	The Brothers Karamazov	1					
1958	Cat on a Hot Tin Roof	6		3		2	
1960	Elmer Gantry	5	3	3		5	1
1962	Sweet Bird of Youth	3	1	1		4	1
1965	Lord Jim			2			
1966	The Professionals	3				2	
1967	In Cold Blood	4				1	
1969	The Happy Ending	2				3	
1975	Bite the Bullet	2					
1977	Looking for Mr. Goodbar	2				1	
Total		33	4	9		18	2

=== Oscar-related Performances ===
These actors have received Academy Award nominations and wins for their respective roles in Brooks' feature motion picture.

Year	Performer	Feature Picture	Result
Academy Award for Best Actor
1959	Paul Newman	Cat on a Hot Tin Roof	Nominated
1961	Burt Lancaster	Elmer Gantry	Won
Academy Award for Best Actress
1959	Elizabeth Taylor	Cat on a Hot Tin Roof	Nominated
1963	Geraldine Page	Sweet Bird of Youth	Nominated
1970	Jean Simmons	The Happy Ending	Nominated
Academy Award for Best Supporting Actor
1959	Lee J. Cobb	The Brothers Karamazov	Nominated
1963	Ed Begley	Sweet Bird of Youth	Won
Academy Award for Best Supporting Actress
1961	Shirley Jones	Elmer Gantry	Won
1963	Shirley Knight	Sweet Bird of Youth	Nominated
1978	Tuesday Weld	Looking for Mr. Goodbar	Nominated

== Additional sources ==
Daniel, Douglass K. (2011). Tough as Nails: The Life and Films of Richard Brooks. University of Wisconsin Press. ISBN 978-0299251246.
