= Arthur Space =

American actor (1908–1983)

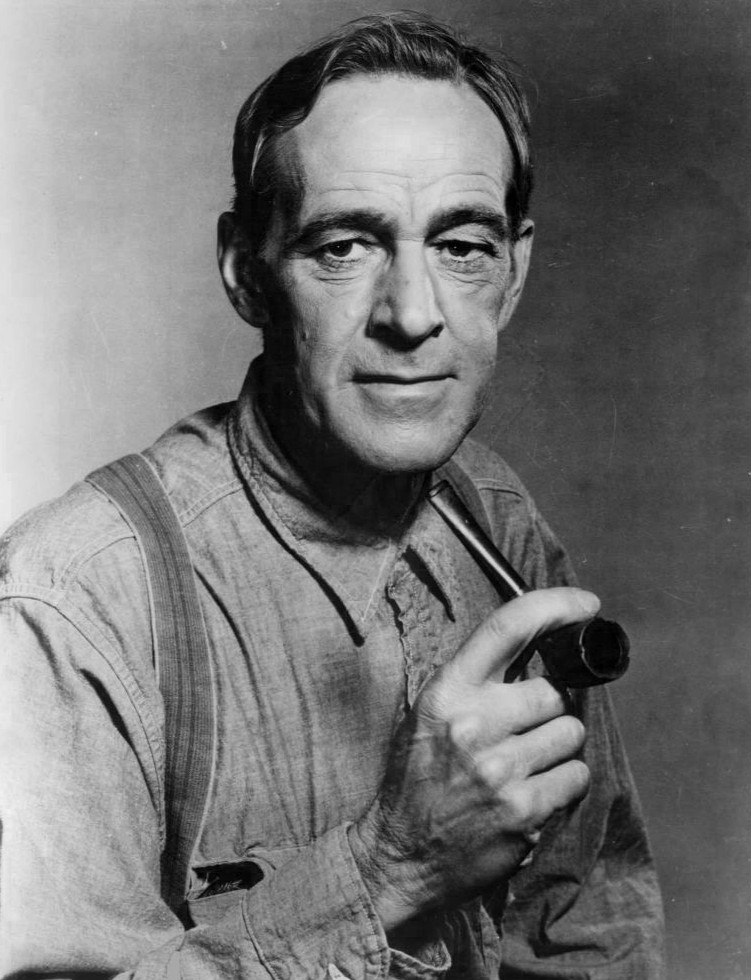
- Space as dairy farmer Herbert Brown in NBC's National Velvet (1960)
- Born: Charles Arthur Space; October 12, 1908; New Brunswick, New Jersey, U.S.
- Died: January 13, 1983 (aged 74); Hollywood, Los Angeles, California, U.S.
- Occupation: Actor
- Years active: 1941–1981

Charles Arthur Space (October 12, 1908 – January 13, 1983) was an American film, television and stage actor. Today's audiences know him as the eccentric inventor opposite Laurel and Hardy in The Big Noise (1944), and as veterinarian Doc Weaver in 39 episodes of the CBS television series Lassie.

== Early years ==
Born in New Brunswick, New Jersey, Space first delved into acting at Douglass College.

== Career ==
Space began his career in summer stock theater and eventually began appearing on Broadway. His Broadway credits include Three Men on a Horse and Awake and Sing.

Producer Edward Finney cast Space as an urbane hoodlum in the 1941 crime drama Riot Squad, starring Richard Cromwell and released by PRC. He jumped from the PRC company to the Metro-Goldwyn-Mayer studio. Under contract to MGM, Space appeared alongside Abbott and Costello in Rio Rita, and had roles in Tortilla Flat, Grand Central Murder, Andy Hardy's Double Life, and others. Space remained with MGM but took assignments at other studios, including Twentieth Century-Fox, Columbia, and Universal. At Fox, he appeared in the Laurel and Hardy comedy The Big Noise, in which Space played the second lead to the starring team.

Space appeared in three Republic chapter plays: Government Agents vs. Phantom Legion, Canadian Mounties vs. Atomic Invaders, and Panther Girl of the Kongo.

In 1953, Space played Lt. Col. William Barrett Travis, the commander during the siege at the Alamo, in The Man from the Alamo (1953). Space was unbilled.

In 1954, Space played the bandit Black Bart, or Charles Bolles, in an episode of the syndicated Western television series Stories of the Century.

Throughout the mid-1950s, Space continued appearing in films such as The Spirit of St. Louis with James Stewart while guest starring on various television series. He appeared four times as Col. Tomkin in the ABC Western series, Colt .45, starring Wayde Preston. During this time, Space had a recurring role as veterinarian Dr. Frank Weaver on Lassie (Jeff’s Collie in syndication).

Space was cast as Ben Hudson in the 1959 episode "Hang 'Em High", on the syndicated anthology series, Death Valley Days, hosted by Stanley Andrews. The dramatization focuses on the completion in 1861 of the first transcontinental telegraph line. Hudson determines that Confederates have attempted to sabotage construction because the telegraph would most benefit the Union government. Paul Birch and William Schallert were cast in the episode as Mike Walsh and Ellis Higby, respectively.

In 1960, Space landed the role of the practical farmer Herbert Brown in the 58-episode NBC television series National Velvet, with Lori Martin as his equestrian daughter, Velvet Brown, and Ann Doran as his wife, Martha. After the series ended in 1962, Space continued acting in both television and films. Among his roles were four Perry Mason appearances between 1958 and 1964. In his first appearance he played murder suspect Willard Scott in "The Case of the Rolling Bones," and his final role was as murder suspect Edgarton Cartwell in "The Case of the Paper Bullets." In a 1963 episode of "Wagon Train" (S6 E34), he played Martin Wells, a father who is tricked into a murder plot in "Alias Bill Hawks". In 1969 Space appeared as Sam Foster on the TV series The Virginian in the episode titled "A Woman of Stone."

In 1978, he appeared in an episode of The Waltons titled "The Beau", playing Grandma Walton's former boyfriend Marcus Dane. His last role was in a 1981 episode of the television series, Walking Tall.

== Death ==
Space died of cancer at his home in Hollywood on January 13, 1983, at the age of 74.

== Filmography ==
Film
Year	Title	Role	Notes
1941	Riot Squad	Butch	
1942	The Bugle Sounds	Hank	
1942	Rio Rita	Trask	
1942	Tortilla Flat	Mr. Brown	
1942	Grand Central Murder	Detective with Doolin	Uncredited
1942	Enemy Agents Meet Ellery Queen	Lido Club Desk Clerk	Uncredited
1942	Tish	Court Clerk	Uncredited
1942	Random Harvest	Traumatized Patient #2	Uncredited
1942	Quiet Please, Murder	Vance	Uncredited
1942	Reunion in France	Henker – German Officer	Uncredited
1942	Tennessee Johnson	Doctor	Uncredited
1942	Andy Hardy's Double Life	Mrs. Stedman's Attorney	Uncredited
1943	They Came to Blow Up America	FBI Agent Arresting Rowboat Spy	Uncredited
1943	Appointment in Berlin	Staff Officer	Uncredited
1943	This Is the Army	Soldier	Uncredited
1943	Salute to the Marines	Cpl. Swenson	Uncredited
1943	The Man from Down Under	Bailey	Uncredited
1943	Swing Shift Maisie	Instructor	Uncredited
1943	The Dancing Masters	Director	Uncredited
1943	A Guy Named Joe	San Francisco Airport Captain	Uncredited
1943	Whistling in Brooklyn	Detective MacKenzie	
1944	Ladies Courageous	Tower Man	Uncredited
1944	The Ghost That Walks Alone	Cedric Jessup	
1944	The Heavenly Body	Pierson	
1944	Rationing	Leafy	
1944	Wing and a Prayer	Executive Officer Reporting Aft Damage	Uncredited
1944	Wilson	Francis Sayre	Uncredited
1944	Marriage Is a Private Affair	Drunken Man	Uncredited
1944	The Big Noise	Alva P. Hartley	
1944	Strange Affair	Mac – Police Chemist	Uncredited
1944	The Mark of the Whistler	Sellers, Bell Captain	Uncredited
1944	The Woman in the Window	Captain Kennedy	Uncredited
1944	Thirty Seconds Over Tokyo	Deck Officer	Uncredited
1944	Music for Millions	Colonel	Uncredited
1944	Gentle Annie	Sam Barker	Uncredited
1945	This Man's Navy	Station Commander	Uncredited
1945	Leave It to Blondie	Mr. Fuddle	Uncredited
1945	The Clock	Blood Tester	Uncredited
1945	Son of Lassie	Warrant Officer	Uncredited
1945	Twice Blessed	Contest Judge	Uncredited
1945	The Hidden Eye	Chemical Company Official	Uncredited
1945	Our Vines Have Tender Grapes	Pete Hanson	
1945	Abbott and Costello in Hollywood	Director Lippen	
1945	The Crimson Canary	Detective Carlyle	
1946	Mysterious Intruder	Davis – Summers' Henchman	
1946	Lost City of the Jungle	"System" Reeves	
1946	Bad Bascomb	Timber City Sheriff	Uncredited
1946	The Man Who Dared	Marty Martin	Uncredited
1946	Boys' Ranch	Mr. O'Neill	
1946	Courage of Lassie	Officer	Uncredited
1946	Black Beauty	Terry	
1946	The Mysterious Mr. Valentine	County Coroner	
1946	Gentleman Joe Palooka	Reporter Quimby	Uncredited
1946	Child of Divorce	Joan's Attorney	Uncredited
1946	Home in Oklahoma	Coroner Jud Judnick	
1946	The Cockeyed Miracle	Amos Spellman	
1946	The Secret of the Whistler	Dr. Gunther	Uncredited
1946	Magnificent Doll	Alexander Hamilton	Uncredited
1946	That Brennan Girl	Mr. Krasman	Uncredited
1947	Mr. District Attorney	Party Guest	Uncredited
1947	The Guilt of Janet Ames	Nelson	
1947	The Red House	The Sheriff	Alternative title: No Trespassing
1947	Millie's Daughter	Tappie	
1947	Heartaches	Dan Savronic, postal inspector	
1947	Rustlers of Devil's Canyon	Doc Cole	
1947	The Crimson Key	Det. Capt. Fitzroy	
1947	Key Witness	Dr. Jergins	Uncredited
1947	The Invisible Wall	Roy Hanford	
1947	Her Husband's Affairs	District Attorney	Uncredited
1947	Big Town After Dark	Fletcher—City Editor	Uncredited
1948	I Love Trouble	Sgt. Muller	Uncredited
1948	Homecoming	Col. Norton	Uncredited
1948	The Fuller Brush Man	Police Lt. Quint	
1948	Silver River	Maj. Ross	
1948	Tap Roots	Caller	Uncredited
1948	A Southern Yankee	Mark Haskins	Alternative title: My Hero
1948	Walk a Crooked Mile	Mr. North	Uncredited
1948	The Return of October	Radio Salesman	Uncredited
1948	Joan of Arc	Luxembourg Guard	Uncredited
1948	Fighter Squadron	Maj. Sanford	
1948	The Paleface	Zach	Uncredited
1949	Shockproof	Police Inspector	Uncredited
1949	The Lone Wolf and His Lady	Fisher	Uncredited
1949	El Paso	John Elkins	
1949	Mr. Belvedere Goes to College	Proctor for Entrance Exam	Uncredited
1949	Sorrowful Jones	Plainclothes Policeman	Uncredited
1949	Lust for Gold	Old Man	Uncredited
1949	House of Strangers	Bank Examiner	Uncredited
1949	Any Number Can Play	Reporter	Uncredited
1949	Miss Grant Takes Richmond	Architect Willacombe	Uncredited
1949	Mary Ryan, Detective	Mike Faber	Uncredited
1949	Chicago Deadline	Detective Pete Peterson	Uncredited
1950	Father Is a Bachelor	Lucius Staley	Uncredited
1950	The Good Humor Man	Steven	
1950	The Vanishing Westerner	Sheriff John Fast / Sir Cedric Fast	
1950	The Happy Years	Al	Uncredited
1950	The Fuller Brush Girl	Insp. Rodgers	
1950	The Killer That Stalked New York	Dr. Penner	Uncredited
1951	Tomahawk	Captain Fetterman	
1951	Night Riders of Montana	Roger Brandon	
1951	Three Guys Named Mike	Airline Clerk	Uncredited
1951	Up Front	Col. Hayes	Uncredited
1951	Her First Romance	Joseph 'Joe' Foster	
1951	Government Agents vs. Phantom Legion	Crandall	Serial
1951	Criminal Lawyer	Ed Kelly – City Editor	Uncredited
1951	Chain of Circumstance	Dr. Andrews	Uncredited
1951	Utah Wagon Train	Robert Hatfield	
1951	The Barefoot Mailman	Piggot	
1952	Jet Job	Davison	
1952	African Treasure	Greg	
1952	Red Ball Express	Colonel at Briefing	Uncredited
1952	Sound Off	Barney Fisher	Uncredited
1952	Jumping Jacks	Doctor in Hospital	Uncredited
1952	Here Come the Marines	Capt. Miller	
1952	Sudden Fear	George Ralston	Uncredited
1952	Fargo	Austin	
1952	Feudin' Fools	Mr. Thompson	
1952	Rainbow 'Round My Shoulder	Joe Brady	
1952	Because of You	Judge	Uncredited
1953	Battle Circus	Colonel	Uncredited
1953	Confidentially Connie	Prof. Archie Archibald	
1953	Canadian Mounties vs. Atomic Invaders	Marlof (Smokey Joe)	Serial
1953	So This Is Love	Director	Uncredited
1953	The Man from the Alamo	Lt. Col. William Barrett Travis	Uncredited
1953	Clipped Wings	FBI Agent	Uncredited
1953	Last of the Pony Riders	Jess Hogan	
1953	Back to God's Country	Carstairs	
1953	The Eddie Cantor Story	Phil	Uncredited
1954	Yankee Pasha	U.S. Consul Richard O'Brien	
1954	Ring of Fear	Psychiatrist	Uncredited
1954	A Star Is Born	Court clerk	Uncredited
1954	Target Earth	Lt. General Wood	
1954	Drum Beat	Army Doctor	Uncredited
1954	The Silver Chalice	Stall Keeper	Uncredited
1955	Panther Girl of the Kongo	Dr. Morgan	
1955	Rage at Dawn	Murphy – Bartender	Uncredited
1955	Wyoming Renegades	Eldridge	Uncredited
1955	The Eternal Sea	Rescue Ship Doctor	Uncredited
1955	Foxfire	Foley	
1955	A Man Alone	Doctor Mason	
1955	The Spoilers	Bank Manager	
1956	The Killer Is Loose	Bill, Police Chief	Uncredited
1956	Away All Boats	Doctor Flynn	
1957	The Spirit of St. Louis	Donald A. Hall	
1957	20 Million Miles to Earth	Dr. Sharman	
1958	St. Louis Blues	Fred Duckett	Uncredited
1958	Twilight for the Gods	Officer	
1959	Day of the Outlaw	Clay	Uncredited
1959	A Summer Place	Ken's attorney	Uncredited
1960	Gunfighters of Abilene	Rigley	Uncredited
1964	Taggart	Colonel	Uncredited
1968	The Shakiest Gun in the West	Sheriff Tolliver	
1971	Bedknobs and Broomsticks	Old Home Guardsman	Uncredited
1971	Shoot Out	Storekeeper	Uncredited
1972	The Folks at Red Wolf Inn	Henry Smith	
1973	Frasier, the Sensuous Lion	Dredge	
1974	The Bat People	Tramp	
1974	Herbie Rides Again	Beach Caretaker	
1975	The Strongest Man in the World	Regent Shaw	
1976	Mansion of the Doomed	Wino	
1978	The Swarm	Engineer	
1979	Promises in the Dark	Patient in Examining Room	
1980	On the Nickel	Soapy Post	
Television
Year	Title	Role	Notes
1952–1959	Death Valley Days	Ben Cannon / Ben Hudson / two other characters	4 episodes, "The Little Dressmaker of Bodie" (1952), "The Rainbow Chaser" (1954), "The Talking Wire" (1959), and "Hang 'Em High (1959)
1954	City Detective	Lawyer Fletcher	1 episode
1954	Stories of the Century	Black Bart	"Black Bart"
1954	Topper	Hamilton	1 episode
1954	Annie Oakley	Carl Bishop / The Warden	2 episodes, "Valley of the Shadows" and "Annie's Desert Adventure"
1955	Medic	Dr. William Stewart Halstead	1 episode
1955	Alfred Hitchcock Presents	Mr. Chambers – Parole Officer	Season 1 Episode 12: "Santa Claus and the Tenth Avenue Kid"
1956	Crusader	Walter Cronan	2 episodes, "The Syndicate" and "The Healer"
1956	Dick Powell's Zane Grey Theatre	Lee Rabin	"Muletown Gold Strike"
1956–1957	Telephone Time		2 episodes, "Boarders Away" (1956) and "Sam Houston's Decision (1957)
1957	The New Adventures of Charlie Chan	Barker	1 episode
1957	The Californians	Prosecutor	"The Regulators"
1957	Trackdown	Doc	"Sweetwater, Texas"
1957	The Sheriff of Cochise	Mr. Farnsworth	"Deep Fraud"
1957–1958	Broken Arrow	Marshal Neilson / Marshal Gary	2 episodes, "The Trial" (1957) and "Warrant for Arrest" (1958)
1958	Official Detective	Kenneth Paul	Episode: "Hired Killer"
1957–1959	Whirlybirds	Sheriff / Mr. Scoville	3 episodes, "Sky Net", "Mister Q", and "Sitting Duck"
1957–1960	Tales of Wells Fargo	Willow Creek Sheriff / Hank Stiles / Arnold	3 episodes, "The Thin Rope" (1957), "Scapegoat" (1958), and "Dealer's Choice (1960)
1958	The Restless Gun	Sam Ditley	"Friend in Need"
1958	Cimarron City		"I, the People"
1959	Leave It to Beaver	Mr. Judson	"Wally's Present"
1959	26 Men	Ben Thompson	2 episodes, "Ranger Without a Badge" and "Trail of Revenge"
1959	Zorro	Gonzalez	3 episodes
1959	U.S. Marshal	Lou Carter	"Trigger Happy"
1959	Bat Masterson	Doc Ferguson	"Promised Land"
1959	Dennis the Menace	Dr. Sinclair	"Mr. Wilson's Award"
1959	Tightrope!	Kemp	"The Neon Wheel"
1959	Wichita Town	Sid Durant	"The Devil's Choice"
1960	The Rifleman	Conductor	"The Grasshopper"
1960	Have Gun – Will Travel	Sayer	Episode "The Night the Town Died"
1960	Overland Trail	Judge	"High Bridge"
1960	Man with a Camera	Colonel Boyar	"Kangaroo Court"
1960	Johnny Ringo	Seth	"The Vindicator"
1960	M Squad	Dr. Green	"Dead Parrots Don't Talk"
1959–1960	Bronco	Sheriff / Morgan Owing / Lansford	"Bodyguard" and "The Last Resort" (1959) and "Winter Kill" (1960)
1966	Daniel Boone	Sawyer	"Gun-Barrel Highway"
1967	Voyage to the Bottom of the Sea	Dr. Land	1 episode
1967	Iron Horse	Andy	"Gallows for Bill Pardew"
1968	Here Come the Brides	Dr. Booth	"A Crying Need"
1968	The Wild Wild West	Senator A. T. Redmond	"The Night of the Sedgewick Curse"
1969	Mayberry R.F.D.	Michaels	1 episode
1970	The Young Lawyers	Judge Marley	1 episode
1970	The Bold Ones: The Senator	Louis Masterson	1 episode
1970	The Bold Ones: The Lawyers	Dr. Johnson	1 episode
1974	Marcus Welby, M.D.	Dr. Olson	1 episode
1974	Rhoda	Doctor	1 episode
1975	Emergency!	Jamison Watters	1 episode
1975	The Six Million Dollar Man	Carruthers	1 episode
1976	Alice	Stuff Johnson	1 episode
1976	Little House on the Prairie	Phineas Jenks	1 episode, "Fred"
1977	Kojak	Ezra Rawlings	"Letters of Death"
1978	The Waltons	Marcus Dane	1 episode, "The Beau"
1980	Charlie's Angels	Mr. Mayhew	"Home $weet Homes"
