= Sid Tomack =

American actor (1907–1962)

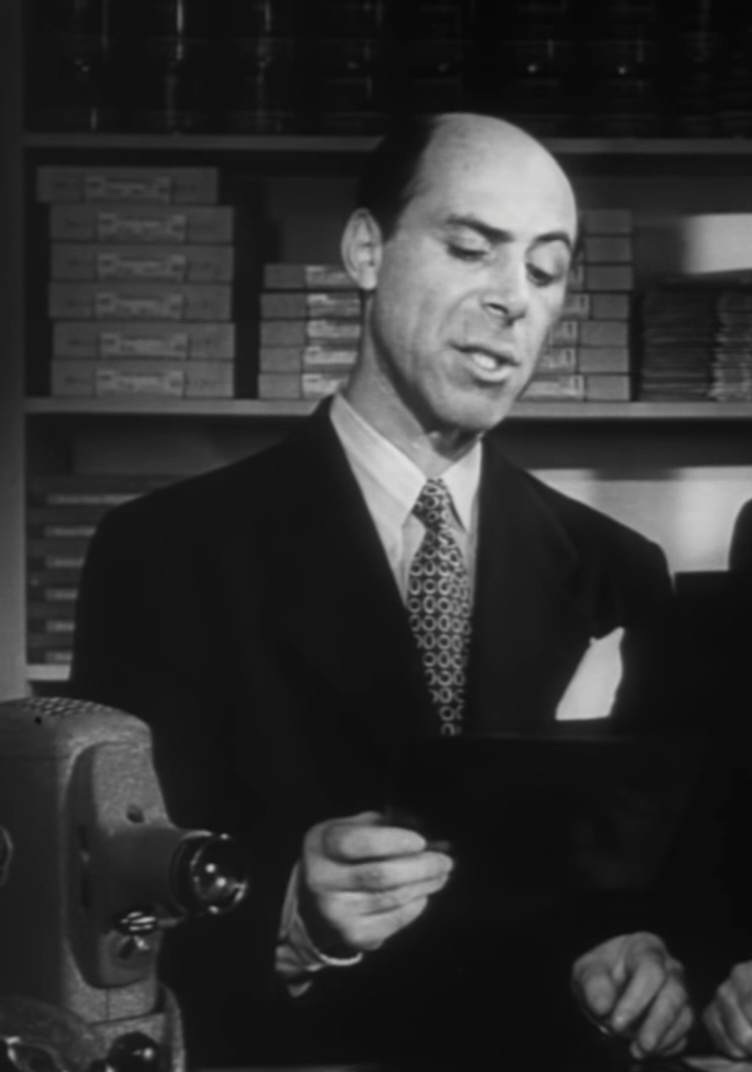
- Tomack in Hollow Triumph (1948)
- Born: September 8, 1907; Brooklyn, New York, U.S.
- Died: November 12, 1962 (aged 55); Palm Springs, California, U.S.
- Resting place: Desert Memorial Park, Cathedral City, California
- Occupation: Actor
- Years active: 1940–1962

Sid Tomack (September 8, 1907 – November 12, 1962) was an American actor. He appeared in films and on television.

== Career ==
His film career included: A Wave, a WAC and a Marine, The Thrill of Brazil, Blind Spot, Blondie's Holiday, For the Love of Rusty, A Double Life, I Love Trouble, My Girl Tisa, Hollow Triumph, Homicide for Three, Force of Evil, Knock on Any Door, Boston Blackie's Chinese Venture, The Crime Doctor's Diary, Make Believe Ballroom, The Doctor and the Girl, Abandoned, Side Street, Love That Brute, The Fuller Brush Girl, Never Trust a Gambler, Joe Palooka in Triple Cross, Reunion in Reno, Hoodlum Empire, Somebody Loves Me, Living It Up, The Girl Rush, The Kettles in the Ozarks, These Wilder Years, Too Much, Too Soon, The Space Children, Wake Me When It's Over, The Wackiest Ship in the Army and Sail a Crooked Ship, among others.

== Television ==
Tomack played Chester A. Riley's friend and neighbor Jim Gillis in the first version of The Life of Riley (starring Jackie Gleason). He played Al, Irma Peterson's deadbeat boyfriend, in My Friend Irma. He also played Knobby Walsh, the fight manager of Joe Palooka, in the first thirteen episodes of the syndicated series, The Joe Palooka Story. Tomack also played villainous roles in several episodes of The Adventures of Superman in the 1950s, including "The Defeat Of Superman" and "Blackmail." He guest-starred on four episodes of Perry Mason. He was also on The Donna Reed Show.

== Death ==
Living in the Desert Park Estates neighborhood of Palm Springs, California, Tomack died on November 12, 1962, in Palm Springs at age 55. He was buried in Desert Memorial Park, in Cathedral City, California. Tomack was Jewish.

== Selected filmography ==
- Forgotten Girls (1940) – Reporter (uncredited)
- Song of the Open Road (1944) – Makeup Man (uncredited)
- A Wave, a WAC and a Marine (1944) – Sid Tomack – Man in Cab
- The Thrill of Brazil (1946) – Irikie Bowers
- Blind Spot (1947) – Mike Foster – Bartender
- Blondie's Holiday (1947) – Pete Brody
- For the Love of Rusty (1947) – Moe Hatch
- Framed (1947) – Bartender (uncredited)
- A Double Life (1947) – Wigmaker
- I Love Trouble (1948) – Buster Buffin (uncredited)
- My Girl Tisa (1948) – BinkaBinka
- The Babe Ruth Story (1948) – Bartender (uncredited)
- Hollow Triumph (1948) – Artell – Manager
- Homicide for Three (1948) – Cab Driver
- Force of Evil (1948) – Two & Two Taylor (uncredited)
- Knock on Any Door (1948) – Duke the Fence (uncredited)
- Boston Blackie's Chinese Venture (1949) – The Runt
- Alias Nick Beal (1949) – Bartender (uncredited)
- The Crime Doctor's Diary (1949) – Blane aka Blaney the Dip (uncredited)
- Make Believe Ballroom (1949) – Joe (uncredited)
- Sorrowful Jones (1949) – Waiter at Steve's Place (uncredited)
- House of Strangers (1949) – Waiter (uncredited)
- The Doctor and the Girl (1949) – Mr. Cohen (uncredited)
- Abandoned (1949) – Mr. Humes
- Black Hand (1950) – Handwriting Expert (uncredited)
- Side Street (1950) – Louie (uncredited)
- Appointment with Danger (1950) – Trainman (uncredited)
- Love That Brute (1950) – Baldy Louie (uncredited)
- The Fuller Brush Girl (1950) – Bangs (uncredited)
- The Lemon Drop Kid (1951) – Groom (scenes deleted)
- Never Trust a Gambler (1951) – Emil Gillis – Bus Driver (uncredited)
- Joe Palooka in Triple Cross (1951) – Second Trainer
- Reunion in Reno (1951) – Serge Field
- Two Tickets to Broadway (1951) – 2nd Bus Driver (uncredited)
- Hoodlum Empire (1952) – Meyers (uncredited)
- Woman of the North Country (1952) – Hotel Clerk (uncredited)
- Somebody Loves Me (1952) – Harry Lake
- Living It Up (1954) – Master of Ceremonies
- My Sister Eileen (1955) – Counterman (uncredited)
- The Girl Rush (1955) – Victor's Business Manager (uncredited)
- The Kettles in the Ozarks (1956) – Benny
- That Certain Feeling (1956) – Shooting Gallery Proprietor (uncredited)
- These Wilder Years (1956) – Jess, the Bartender (uncredited)
- The Opposite Sex (1956) – Nightclub Waiter (uncredited)
- Spring Reunion (1957) – Caterer (uncredited)
- Too Much, Too Soon (1958) – Harry / Dick Harrison (uncredited)
- The Space Children (1958) – Reporter Dan Wicks (uncredited)
- Never Steal Anything Small (1959) – Small Man (uncredited)
- Last Train from Gun Hill (1959) – Roomer (uncredited)
- Wake Me When It's Over (1960) – Sam – Bartender (uncredited)
- The Wackiest Ship in the Army (1960) – Arthur, Bartender at Kangaroo Club (uncredited)
- Sail a Crooked Ship (1961) – Sammy
