= Fuller brush man =

Fuller brush man may refer to:

- Door-to-door salesmen for the Fuller Brush Company
- The Fuller Brush Man, a 1948 comedy film
