= The Fuller Brush Man =

1948 film by S. Sylvan Simon

- Theatrical poster
- Directed by: S. Sylvan Simon
- Written by: Devery Freeman; Frank Tashlin
- Based on: "Now You See It" by Roy Huggins
- Produced by: S. Sylvan Simon; Edward Small
- Starring: Red Skelton; Janet Blair
- Cinematography: Lester White
- Edited by: Al Clark
- Music by: Heinz Roemheld
- Production company: Edward Small Productions
- Distributed by: Columbia Pictures
- Release date: June 1948
- Running time: 93 minutes
- Country: United States
- Language: English
- Budget: $950,000
- Box office: $3.1 million (US rentals) and $2.5 million (worldwide)

The Fuller Brush Man is a 1948 American comedy film directed by S. Sylvan Simon and released by Columbia Pictures. The film stars Red Skelton as a door-to-door salesman for the Fuller Brush Company who becomes a murder suspect. Written by Devery Freeman and Frank Tashlin, it is based upon the 1946 story Now You See It by Roy Huggins that was published in The Saturday Evening Post.

== Plot ==
Success does not exactly stare the unfortunate street cleaner Red Jones (Red Skelton) in the eye, and when he decides to propose to his sweetheart Ann Elliot (Janet Blair), who is a secretary at the Fuller Brush company, she demands that he makes something more of himself before she can accept the offer. She suggests he should follow the example of a salesman and friend of hers, Keenan Wallick (Don McGuire), who works at her company. Red gets a chance to prove himself worthy sooner than he had expected when he is fired from his job as a cleaner by his boss, Gordon Trist (Nicholas Joy), because he accidentally sets a trash can on fire in the line of duty, and smashes Trist's car window. Ann gives him a chance to show his skills as a door-to-door salesman for the Fuller Brush company, and he is teamed up with her friend Keenan. Both Ann and Red are unaware that Keenan himself has a romantic interest in Ann, and wants to get Red out of the way as soon as possible, so he can pursue Ann without competition. Keenan assigns Red a list of the hardest homes, and Red fails tremendously with his task of selling to an almost impossible potential customer. He has a comical run-in with a troublesome small boy, and a beautiful model at another home tries to seduce him.

Seeing how unsuccessful Red's sales attempts are, Keenan comes up with the idea of a bet – the winner gets to pursue Ann without interference of the other man – which he suggests to Red. The bet is that Red won't be able to sell a single brush to the households on their run. Red takes the bet, and the next household on their run is the mansion of his old boss Gordon Trist. After Red tries to hide from Gordon and the groundskeeper, Gordon recognizes Red and sends him packing, but his wife comes after Red and buys ten brushes from him.

Red returns to Anna and Keenan in high spirits, until he realizes he forgot to collect the payment money from Mrs. Trist. When Red comes back to the Trist home, he overhears a conversation between his former boss, Keenan, Gregory Cruckston (Donald Curtis) and a few other persons, as they discuss their involvement in a racketeering operation. Red is caught eavesdropping and knocked unconscious after he is brought into the house. When he comes back to life, Gordon has been murdered in the dark, and everyone present in the house is arrested by police lieutenant Quint (Arthur Space), all suspected of murder.

Red is released since there is no evidence pointing to him being the killer, and when he comes home he discovers Mrs. Trist (Hillary Brooke) waiting for him with the money. Soon after, Sara arrives at his home and is followed by Freddie Trist (Ross Ford), Gordon's son, with two armed gangsters. The gangsters hold everyone hostage as they search in vain for the murder weapon that killed Gordon. Ann and Red conclude that the weapon must have been a Fuller brush, molded into a knife-looking object. Cruckston stops them from telling policeman Quint about the weapon, and it turns out Cruckston, who is Gordon's partner in crime, is the murderer. Ann and Red escape from him and his gangsters. Cruckston is arrested and Red is the hero of the day, winning Ann's heart in the process. The climax is a monster chase sequence through a war surplus warehouse, in which Red accidentally cuts into every radio in the city and broadcasts unusual messages. A stockpile of illegal fireworks is detonated, attracting the police. During the chase, Keenan reveals himself to be a coward of the first degree and Ann returns to Red's arms.

== Cast ==
- Red Skelton as Red Jones
- Janet Blair as Ann Elliott
- Don McGuire as Keenan Wallick
- Hillary Brooke as Mildred Trist
- Adele Jergens as Miss Sharmley
- Ross Ford as Freddie Trist
- Trudy Marshall as Sara Franzen
- Nicholas Joy as Commissioner Gordon Trist
- Donald Curtis as Gregory Cruckston
- Arthur Space as Lieutenant Quint

== Production ==
The project had been in development for four years. Producer Simon got permission from the Fuller Brush company and wrote the story with Skelton in mind but was unable to secure studio interest until the success of Miracle on 34th Street (1947) showed the benefits of commercial tie-ins for feature films. He set the project up at Columbia conditional upon MGM agreeing to loan him out.

Producer Edward Small was owed a favour by MGM as he agreed not to make a film called D'Artagnan to clash with their production of The Three Musketeers (1948). Small and Simon then purchased a story in the Saturday Evening Post by Roy Huggins.

The Fuller Brush Company gave their final approval provided it was clear in the final movie that the character Skelton played was an independent dealer and not an employee of the company.

== See also ==
- The Fuller Brush Girl
