= Nottingham Knockers =

Aggressive door-to-door salesmen in the UK

Nottingham Knockers are aggressive door-to-door salesmen that sell goods at inflated prices to vulnerable people. They are also believed to act as scouts for later burglaries.

They often claim to be ex-convicts on a rehabilitation scheme and show ID cards that purport to confirm this.

While they appear to have originated in Nottingham, they have been reported in numerous locations in the United Kingdom.
