= Night Editor =

1946 film by Henry Levin

- Theatrical release poster
- Directed by: Henry Levin
- Screenplay by: Hal Smith
- Based on: Night Editor episode "Inside Story" by Scott Littleton
- Produced by: Ted Richmond
- Starring: William Gargan; Janis Carter; Jeff Donnell
- Cinematography: Burnett Guffey; Philip Tannura
- Edited by: Richard Fantl
- Production company: Columbia Pictures
- Distributed by: Columbia Pictures
- Release date: March 29, 1946 (United States)
- Running time: 67 minutes
- Country: United States
- Language: English

Night Editor is a 1946 American film noir directed by Henry Levin and starring William Gargan, Janis Carter and Jeff Donnell. It was based on a popular radio program of the same name. The script for the film was based on a previous radio program episode "Inside Story." A B-movie produced by Columbia Pictures, the movie was to be the first in a series of films featuring stories about the graveyard-shift police beat reporters at a fictional newspaper, the New York Star, but no other Night Editor films were made.

In 2010, Sony Pictures released the film on DVD in the Bad Girls of Film Noir: Volume II box set alongside Women's Prison, One Girl's Confession and Over-Exposed.

== Plot ==
Crane Stewart (Charles D. Brown), the editor of the New York Star, tells his poker buddies a story about a cop involved in a murder investigation.

In flashback, Stewart tells the tale of police lieutenant Tony Cochrane (William Gargan), a family man who cheats on his wife with socialite femme fatale Jill Merrill (Janis Carter). Cochrane and the woman, who is also cheating on her husband, witness a man bludgeoning his girlfriend to death with a tire iron while the couple is parked at "lovers lane" by the beach.

The two can't report the crime without revealing their cheating, a dilemma which eventually leads to bigger troubles. Meanwhile, Cochrane must investigate the killing but is not able to tell anyone he witnessed the crime.

== Cast ==
- William Gargan as Lt. Tony Cochrane
- Janis Carter as Jill Merrill
- Jeff Donnell as Martha Cochrane
- Coulter Irwin as Johnny
- Roy Gordon as Benjamin Merrill
- Charles D. Brown as Crane Stewart
- Paul E. Burns as Police Lt. Ole Strom
- Harry Shamnon as Police Capt. Lawrence
- Frank Wilcox as Douglas Loring
- Robert Kellard as Doc Cochrane (as Robert Stevens)

== Radio program ==
The radio program the film was based upon ran from 1934 until 1948.

Sponsored by Edwards Coffee, this featured Hal Burdick (1893–1978) as the "night editor". Burdick would receive readers’ requests for stories, in a "letter to the editor" format, which he would relate to the listeners. Burdick played all characters in the program. The stories varied greatly including tales of war, adventure, crime, and an occasional ghost story. The radio series was adapted for Night Editor, a short-lived TV series on the DuMont Television Network in 1954, also hosted by Burdick.

Filming started 26 December 1945.

== See also ==
- List of American films of 1946
