= Green River ordinance =

A Green River ordinance is a common United States city ordinance prohibiting door-to-door solicitation. Under such an ordinance, it is illegal for any business to sell their items door-to-door without express prior permission from the household. Some versions prohibit all organizations, including non-profit charitable, political, and religious groups, from soliciting or canvassing any household that makes it clear, in writing, that it does not want such solicitations (generally with a "No Trespassing" or "No Solicitations" sign posted).

The ordinance is named for the city of Green River, Wyoming, which in 1931 was the first city to enact it. The ordinance was unsuccessfully challenged on constitutional grounds by the Fuller Brush Company in 1932.
