= Night Editor (TV series) =

1954 US anthology TV series

- Genre: Anthology
- Written by: Hal Burdick
- Directed by: Dick Sandwick
- Starring: Hal Burdick (host and narrator)
- Country of origin: United States
- Original language: English

Production
- Producers: Ward Byron; Irving Mansfield
- Running time: 15 minutes

Original release
- Network: DuMont
- Release: March 14 – September 8, 1954

Night Editor is a 15-minute anthology television series aired on the DuMont Television Network from March 14 to September 8, 1954. Hal Burdick wrote and narrated the episodes and sometimes acted out the stories. Ward Byron was the producer, and Dick Sandwick was the director.

In December 1952, the series was syndicated by Harry Goodman Productions Incorporated, with 26 15-minute episodes available. Mickey Baron directed, and Burdick again wrote the scripts. Kaiser-Frazer sponsored the show in five markets.

The Complete Directory to Prime Time Network and Cable TV Shows described Night Editor as "one of many attempts by DuMont to devise low-cost TV programming" and went on to cite the use of one actor and one set. Burdick changed his voice to differentiate characters, and the stories themselves provided variety as they ranged "across many periods and subjects".

The program was initially broadcast on Sundays from 10:45 to 11 p.m. Eastern Time. In July 1954, it moved to Wednesdays from 10:30 to 10:45 p.m. Eastern Time.

== Radio version ==
The 15-minute radio program Night Editor debuted on KPO on September 12, 1934, and continued until 1948. Sponsored by Edwards Coffee, the radio series also featured Hal Burdick as the "night editor", a character that Burdick based on R. W. Buchanan, a managing editor for whom Burdick worked. Actor Jack Moyles was also featured on the program, and Burdick's wife, Cornelia, sometimes was heard. Larry Keating was the announcer, and John Ribbs was the producer.

Burdick would receive readers’ requests for stories, in a "letter to the editor" format, which he would relate to the audience. The stories varied greatly including tales of war, adventure, crime, and an occasional ghost story.

== Episode status ==
46 episodes of the television version of Night Editor are held at the J. Fred MacDonald collection of the Library of Congress.

== Film adaptation ==
Columbia Pictures acquired film rights and produced Night Editor (1946), with the film's plot adapted from the "Inside Story" episode of the radio program.

== See also ==
- List of programs broadcast by the DuMont Television Network
- List of surviving DuMont Television Network broadcasts

== Bibliography ==
- David Weinstein, The Forgotten Network: DuMont and the Birth of American Television (Philadelphia: Temple University Press, 2004) ISBN 1-59213-245-6
