= The Ghost That Walks Alone =

1944 film directed by Lew Landers

- Directed by: Lew Landers
- Written by: Richard Shattuck (story); Clarence Upson Young
- Produced by: Jack Fier; John Stone
- Starring: Arthur Lake; Janis Carter; Lynne Roberts
- Cinematography: L. William O'Connell
- Edited by: Jerome Thoms
- Music by: Morris Stoloff
- Production company: Columbia Pictures
- Distributed by: Columbia Pictures
- Release date: February 10, 1944
- Running time: 63 minutes
- Country: United States
- Language: English

The Ghost That Walks Alone is a 1944 American comedy mystery film directed by Lew Landers and starring Arthur Lake, Janis Carter and Lynne Roberts.

== Cast ==
- Arthur Lake as Eddie Grant
- Janis Carter as Enid Turner
- Lynne Roberts as Sue McGuire Grant
- Frank Sully as Beppo
- Warren Ashe as Whitney Burke
- Arthur Space as Cedric Jessup
- Barbara Brown as Milly Westover
- Matt Willis as Tom Walker

== Bibliography ==
- Pitts, Michael R. Columbia Pictures Horror, Science Fiction and Fantasy Films, 1928–1982. McFarland, 2010.
