= Blondie's Holiday =

1947 film by Abby Berlin

- Directed by: Abby Berlin
- Screenplay by: Connie Lee (screenplay)
- Based on: comic strip Blondie by Chic Young
- Produced by: Burt Kelly
- Starring: Penny Singleton; Arthur Lake
- Cinematography: Vincent J. Farrar
- Edited by: Jerome Thoms
- Music by: Mischa Bakaleinikoff
- Distributed by: Columbia Pictures
- Release date: April 10, 1947
- Running time: 67 min.
- Country: United States
- Language: English

Blondie's Holiday is a 1947 American comedy film directed by Abby Berlin and starring Penny Singleton and Arthur Lake. The film is based on the comic strip of the same name. The screenplay was written by Chic Young and Connie Lee.

The film is the twentieth of 28 films based on the comic strip; Columbia Pictures produced them from 1938 to 1950. Daisy, the dog, appeared in every film except this one, as he was playing "Curley" in the 1947 film Red Stallion.

== Plot ==
Dagwood Bumstead is an architect who has managed to convince the prominent bank president Samuel Breckenridge to let his firm have the contract to erect a new bank building in town. When Dagwood's boss at the architect firm, George Radcliffe, hears about the contract, he is ecstatic and offers Dagwood a modest raise of $2.50.

When Dagwood immediately tell his wife Blondie the good news over the telephone, she mistakes the numbers and believes he has gotten a $250 raise. She tells her friends about the fantastic news, and word gets around that Dagwood has made a fortune on his success.

A class reunion is around the corner and Blondie is on the committee planning the festivities. When the rest of the committee, including bigmouth housewife Cynthia Thompson and Paul Madison, who were Dagwood's highschool suitor, hears about Dagwood's fortune, they suggest he pay the bill of $400 for the fancy dinner at the reunion. Blondie has no choice but to accept to defend Dagwood's honor.

Dagwood panics when he hears what Blondie has promised in his name, and starts a desperate search for money to pay for the dinner he can't afford. He sees no other alternative than to try to gamble up the money on the horse race track. He talks to a gambling expert named Pete Brody to learn how to bet, but the bank president hears about his keen interest in gambling and cancels the building contract immediately. Dagwood's boss Radcliffe gets furious when he hears the contract is cancelled, and fires Dagwood on the spot because of this.

Blondie helps out to raise money by making women's hats, thus contributing with $200 to the bill, but when the day of the reunion dinner arrives, Dagwood is still short the other $200. He goes to an illegal gambling parlor and starts betting. He gets advice from an old lady, but still manages to bet the $200 from Blondie on the wrong horse. Despite this, he has good fortune and the horse wins, but the place is raided by the police. Dagwood helps the old lady escape unnoticed from the place, but is arrested by the police himself.

The reunion dinner starts, and Blondie is present, but Dagwood is still in custody at the police station. He calls for Radcliffe to come and bail him out, but bank president Breckenridge beats him to it, arriving shortly after Radcliffe to the station. In company with Breckenridge is the old lady from the gambling parlor, who turns out to be Mrs. Breckenridge. Grateful for Dagwood's help to avoid a public scandal and humiliation, Breckenridge renews the contract to erect a new bank building with the firm, and as a condition he demands Dagwood be rehired. Dagwood throws in another condition for his own account - that Radcliffe pay for the reunion dinner as well.

Dagwood gets out of jail and arrives to the reunion dinner in time to avoid any suspicion, and is able to pay for the festivities.

== Cast ==
- Penny Singleton as Blondie Bumstead
- Arthur Lake as Dagwood Bumstead
- Larry Simms as Alexander Bumstead
- Marjorie Ann Mutchie as Cookie Bumstead
- Daisy as himself
- Jerome Cowan as George M. Radcliffe
- Grant Mitchell as Samuel Breckenridge
- Sid Tomack as Pete Brody
- Mary Young as Mrs. Breckenridge
- Jeff York as Paul Madison
- Anne Nagel as Bea Mason
- Jody Gilbert as Cynthia Thompson
- Jack Rice as Ollie Shaw
