= Swing Out the Blues =

1944 film directed by Malcolm St. Clair

- Poster for the film
- Directed by: Malcolm St. Clair
- Screenplay by: Dorcas Cochran
- Story by: Doris Malloy
- Produced by: Sam White
- Starring: Bob Haymes; Lynn Merrick; Janis Carter
- Cinematography: Arthur Martinelli
- Edited by: Jerome Thoms
- Music by: M. W. Stoloff
- Production company: Columbia Pictures
- Release date: January 20, 1944 (US)
- Running time: 73 minutes
- Country: United States
- Language: English

Swing Out the Blues is a 1944 American romantic comedy film directed by Malcolm St. Clair and starring Bob Haymes, Lynn Merrick, and Janis Carter. It was released on May 22, 1938.

== Plot ==
Rich Cleveland and the Vagabonds are a swing band in financial difficulties. Rich, the lead singer, (Bob Haymes) marries wealthy socialite Lynn Merrick (Penelope Carstairs). The threat that Rich and Lynn will abandon the band forms the conflict in the comic narrative.

== Cast ==
- Bob Haymes as Rich Cleveland
- Lynn Merrick as Penelope Carstairs
- Janis Carter as Dena Marshall
- Tim Ryan as Judge Dudley Gordon
- Joyce Compton as Kitty Grogan
- Arthur Q. Bryan as Larry Stringfellow
- Kathleen Howard as Aunt Amanda
- John Eldredge as Gregg Talbot
- Dick Elliott as Malcolm P. Carstairs
- Lotte Stein as The duchess
- Tor Johnson as weightlifter

== Production ==
Director St. Clair, a veteran of the silent film era, included a lengthy “film-within-a-film” that parodies the early Mack Sennett comedies and appears “in the guise of a home movie.”
