= The Black Arrow (film) =

1948 film by Gordon Douglas

- Theatrical poster
- Directed by: Gordon Douglas; Carl Hiecke
- Screenplay by: Richard Schayer; David P. Sheppard; Thomas Sellar
- Based on: The Black Arrow: A Tale of the Two Roses; 1888 novel by Robert Louis Stevenson
- Produced by: Edward Small; Grant Whytock
- Starring: Louis Hayward; Janet Blair
- Cinematography: Charles Lawton Jr.
- Edited by: Jerome Thoms
- Music by: Paul Sawtell
- Production company: Edward Small Productions
- Distributed by: Columbia Pictures
- Release date: June 30, 1948
- Running time: 76 minutes
- Country: United States
- Language: English
- Budget: $1 million

The Black Arrow is a 1948 American adventure film directed by Gordon Douglas and starring Louis Hayward and Janet Blair. It is an adaptation of the 1888 novel of the same name by Robert Louis Stevenson.

== Plot ==
During the War of the Roses, Sir Richard Shelton returns home to Tunstall Castle in Yorkshire, and discovers that his father, Sir Harry Shelton, has been murdered. Richard's uncle and Harry's half-brother, Sir Daniel Brackley, claims that Sir John Sedley, a Lancastrian and Harry's former friend, murdered him over tribal grudges, and that Sedley was executed in response, and his lands were seized for Brackley's expanding kingdom on behalf of the House of York. Three of Brackley's trusted associates - Nick Appleyard, Bennet Hatch, and Sir Oliver Oates - all back up Brackley's story.

The following morning, Richard is assigned to bring Sedley's daughter Joanna to Tunstall to be Brackley's ward. While travelling back to the castle, Appleyard is shot by an arrow with a message signed by "John Amend-All", marking Brackley and his associates for death, and claiming that Brackley is actually responsible for Sir Harry's death. Appleyard dies at the castle, and Joanna confesses to Richard that "John-Amend-All" is actually Sedley, who survived his execution. Richard and Joanna sneak into a secret passage, but are discovered by Hatch. Richard fights Hatch, and forces him to reveal another way out of the castle. As they sneak onto a watchtower, Brackley finds them and orders the guards to stop them. Joanna is captured, and Richard escapes by jumping into the moat, but is shot in the back by one of the guards.

Richard wakes up in a forest where Sedley and his men are hiding. Sedley reveals Brackley murdered Richard's father and framed Sedley for it, and that his execution was faked with the help of his friend Lawless. Richard thinks that they can talk to the Duke of Gloucester to clear Sedley, but Brackley puts a bounty on Richard, and captures Sedley. The foresters fight back against Brackley's men, and Richard kills Hatch in a duel.

In order to seize Sedley's land, Brackley arranges a wedding between him and Joanna, which the Duke of Gloucester attends as the guest of honor. Richard and Lawless sneak into Tunstall Castle disguised as monks; Lawless gets drunk with the guards, and he and Richard are both found and briefly detained in Sedley's cell, but they manage to fool the guard and escape. From a hidden staircase in the chapel, Lawless shoots and kills Oates, and the wedding is halted. Richard, Sedley, and Lawless arrive in Brackley's chambers, and Richard appeals to the Duke, asking for trial by combat, which he grants. During the joust, Brackley knocks Richard from his horse and breaks most of Richard's weapons, but Richard kills Brackley with his own lance. Sedley is pardoned and given a position in the House of York, and Richard kisses Joanna.

== Cast ==
- Louis Hayward as Sir Richard Shelton
- Janet Blair as Joanna Sedley
- George Macready as Sir Daniel Brackley
- Edgar Buchanan as Lawless
- Rhys Williams as Bennet Hatch
- Walter Kingsford as Sir Oliver Oates
- Lowell Gilmore as Duke of Gloucester
- Halliwell Hobbes as Bishop of Tisbury
- Paul Cavanagh as Sir John Sedley
- Ray Teal as Nick Appleyard
- Russell Hicks as Sir Harry Shelton
- Leslie Denison as Sir William Catesby
- Billy Bevan as Dungeon Keeper
- Harry Cording as Guard (uncredited)

== Production ==
In 1947 Edward Small signed a contract with Columbia to make two films, The Black Arrow and D'Artagnan, the Kingmaker, an adaptation of one of the sequels to The Three Musketeers. Only the former was made but Small made a number of other swashbucklers for Columbia.

Filming started 6 June 1947.

The film uses leftover sets from The Swordsman (1948) and costumes and cast from The Bandit of Sherwood Forest (1946).

The film is briefly seen in Kermit's Swamp Years while Kermit the Frog is hiding in a cinema; watching the sword fight inspires him to go into acting.

== Reception ==
Reviews were positive.

== See also ==
- Black Arrow (1985)
