= Janet Blair =

American singer and actress (1921–2007)

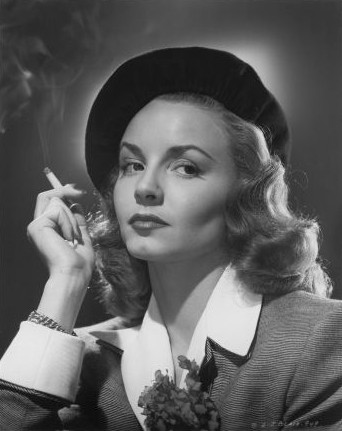
- Blair ca. 1940s
- Born: Martha Janet Lafferty; April 23, 1921; Altoona, Pennsylvania, U.S.
- Died: February 19, 2007 (aged 85); Los Angeles, California, U.S.
- Occupations: Actress, singer
- Years active: 1941–1991
- Known for: My Sister Eileen; Tonight and Every Night; The Fabulous Dorseys; The Fuller Brush Man
- Spouses: Lou Busch (m. 1943; div. 1950) Nick Mayo (m. 1952; div. 1971)
- Children: 2

Janet Blair (born Martha Janet Lafferty; April 23, 1921 – February 19, 2007) was an American big-band singer who later became a popular film and television actress.

== Early life ==
Janet Blair was born Martha Janet Lafferty on April 23, 1921 in Altoona, Pennsylvania, the daughter of musically oriented parents. Her father led the choir and sang solos in his church, and her mother played both piano and organ. She had a brother, Fred Jr., and a sister, Louise.

== Film ==
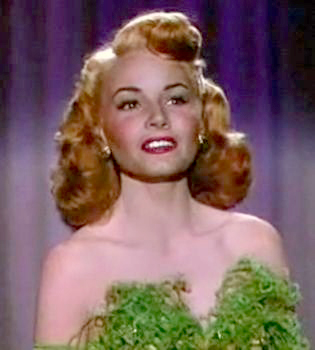
Blair in Tonight and Every Night (1945)

Blair's showbusiness career began as a featured singer in the Hal Kemp Orchestra. She began her film career in 1941 under contract to Columbia Pictures. During World War II, she appeared as the pin-up girl in the March 1944 issue of Yank, the Army Weekly magazine. She appeared in a series of successful films, although she may be best remembered for playing Rosalind Russell's sister in My Sister Eileen (1942) and Rita Hayworth's friend in Tonight and Every Night (1945). Blair returned to her musical roots in 1947, portraying a Big Band singer in the biopic The Fabulous Dorseys, .

She was dropped as a contract player by Columbia in 1947, but went on to star in independently produced pictures released by Columbia, including the crime drama I Love Trouble, the adventure romance The Black Arrow, and the comedy The Fuller Brush Man, all in 1948.

Following these, she did not return to film until 1957. "I gave up Hollywood and I gave up pictures" she explained. "All I got were princess parts. A girl gets tired of being a princess all of the time."

In 1962, she appeared in a rare dramatic role in the British horror film Night of the Eagle and played the wife of Tony Randall in the comedy Boys' Night Out with James Garner and Kim Novak. In 1968, Blair played Katie Bower, spouse to Buddy Ebsen's Calvin Bower in Walt Disney Pictures' The One and Only, Genuine, Original Family Band.

== Stage ==
In 1950, Blair took the lead role of Nellie Forbush in the American touring production of the stage musical South Pacific, with more than 1,200 performances in three years. During the tour, she married her second husband, producer-director Nick Mayo, and they later had two children.

Blair also starred in the Broadway comedy A Girl Can Tell in 1953.

== Television ==
In 1955, Blair starred as Venus in a live production of One Touch of Venus on NBC.

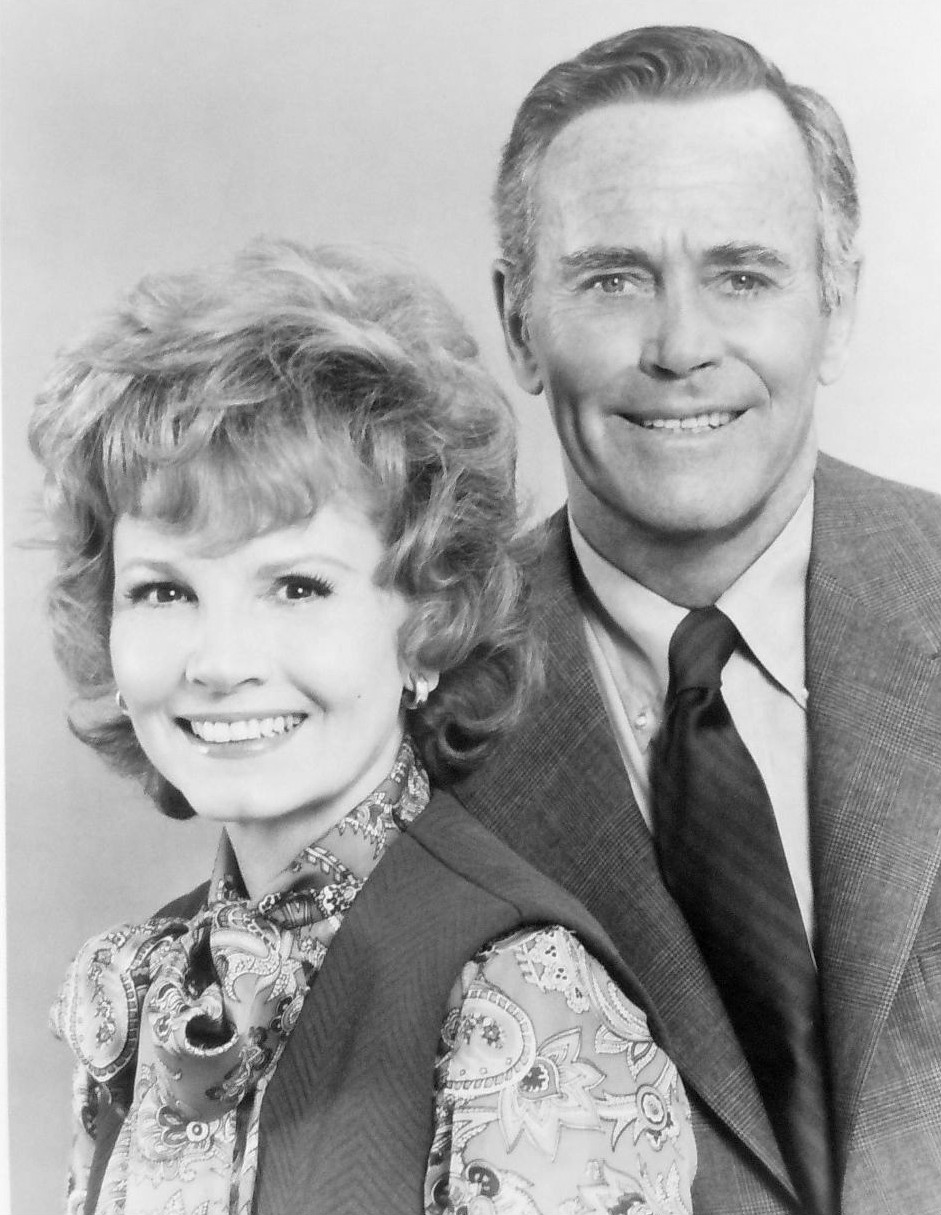
Blair and Henry Fonda in The Smith Family, 1971

Blair appeared on television in various variety-show guest appearances and served as Dinah Shore's summer replacement on the Dinah Shore Chevy Show in 1958. She was a cast member during the 1956–1957 season on Caesar's Hour, a comedy-variety series starring Sid Caesar.

She appeared as a guest panelist on the June 9, 1957 episode of What's My Line?.

Blair costarred with Henry Fonda in The Smith Family, an ABC comedy-drama series. Her last performance on television was in a 1991 episode of Murder, She Wrote.

== Radio ==
On radio, Blair costarred with George Raft in "Broadway," a 1942 episode of Lux Radio Theatre on CBS.

== Recording ==
Blair recorded an album of standards entitled Flame Out! for the Dico label, which included ballads such as "Don't Explain" and "Then You've Never Been Blue".

== Personal life ==
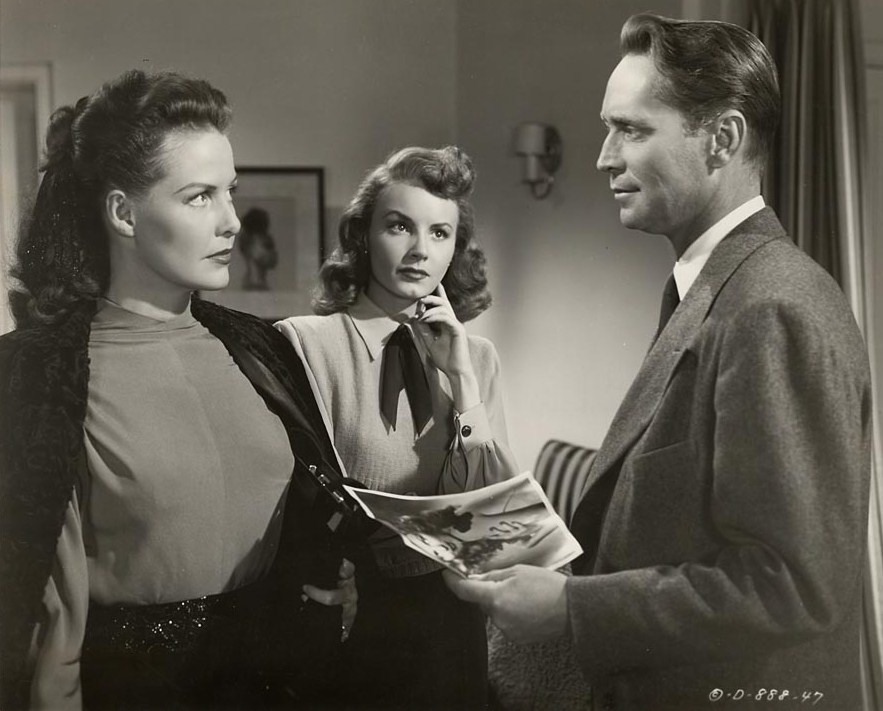
Janis Carter, Blair and Franchot Tone in I Love Trouble (1948)

Blair married musical arranger and conductor Louis Ferdinand Busch on July 12, 1943 in Lake Arrowhead, California. They had met four years earlier when Blair sang for Hal Kemp's band and Busch was Kemp's pianist and arranger. They divorced in March 1950. Two years later, Blair wed television producer Nick Mayo, with whom she later had two children, Andrew and Amanda. The couple remained together for 19 years until their divorce in 1971.

Blair was a Republican and campaigned for Thomas Dewey in the 1944 presidential election.

On February 19, 2007, Blair died at the age of 85 at St. John's Health Center in Santa Monica, California from complications of pneumonia. She was cremated.

== Filmography ==
Year	Title	Role	Notes
1941	Three Girls About Town	Charity Banner	
1942	Blondie Goes to College	Laura Wadsworth	
1942	Two Yanks in Trinidad	Patricia Dare	
1942	Broadway	Billie Moore	
1942	My Sister Eileen	Eileen Sherwood	
1943	Something to Shout About	Jeanie Maxwell	
1944	Once Upon a Time	Jeannie Thompson	
1945	Tonight and Every Night	Judy Kane	
1946	Tars and Spars	Christine Bradley	
1946	Gallant Journey	Regina 'Ginny' Cleary	
1947	The Fabulous Dorseys	Jane Howard	
1948	I Love Trouble	Norma Shannon aka Gretchen Breeger	
1948	The Black Arrow	Joanna Sedley	
1948	The Fuller Brush Man	Ann Elliot	
1957	Public Pigeon No. 1	Edith Enders	
1962	Night of the Eagle	Tansy Taylor	US: Burn, Witch, Burn
1962	Boys' Night Out	Marge Drayton	
1968	The One and Only, Genuine, Original Family Band	Katie Bower	
1976	Won Ton Ton, the Dog Who Saved Hollywood	President's Girl 3	Final film role

=== Television ===
- The Ford Theatre Hour (1948)
- The Chevrolet Tele-Theatre (1949)
- The Philco Television Playhouse (1949)
- Armstrong Circle Theatre (1954) – Marilyn Wilson
- The Elgin Hour (1954) – Lacey Gaddis Clark
- The United States Steel Hour (1954) – Peg St. Claire
- Goodyear Television Playhouse (1955)
- A Connecticut Yankee (1955, TV) – Sandy
- Lux Video Theatre (1955) – Shelly Carnes
- Climax! (1955) – Joan Hale
- Front Row Center (1955) – Kitty Foyle
- One Touch of Venus (1955, TV) – Venus
- Ford Television Theatre (1956) – Mary Higgins
- Screen Directors Playhouse (1956) – Della Morgan
- Caesar's Hour (1956–1957)
- Alcoa Theatre (1958) – Lily Adair
- Around the World with Nellie Bly (1960, TV movie) – Elizabeth Jane Cochran (Nellie Bly)
- The Chevy Mystery Show (1960) – Lisa Townsend
- Shirley Temple's Storybook (1960) – Aunt Polly
- The Dinah Shore Chevy Show (1960–1961) – Herself
- The Outer Limits (1963) – Lynn Arthur
- Bob Hope Presents the Chrysler Theatre (1964) – Polly Emerson
- Destry (1964) – Bessie Hawkins
- Burke's Law (1963–1964) – Violet/Rina Jacobs
- Ben Casey (1966)
- Marcus Welby, M.D. (1970–1973) – Mrs. Carter/Ann Ferris
- The Smith Family (1971–1972) – Betty Smith
- Switch (1977) – Isabel Jensen Craig Harris
- Fantasy Island (1980) – Jackie Flynn
- The Love Boat (1982) – Mrs. Joan Gerber
- Murder, She Wrote (1991) – Bertie

=== Radio ===
- Lux Radio Theatre (1946)
- This Is Hollywood (1946)

== Discography ==
- Flame Out! (Dico Records, 1959)
- A Connecticut Yankee - 1955 Television Cast (JJA Records, 1972)
- Love is the Thing (compilation album, Collectors' Choice Music, 2003)
- Flame Out!/Goodbye to Love (compilation album, Janet Blair & Claudia Thompson, "The Best Voices Time Forgot" series, Fresh Sound Records, 2019)
