= Tom Leutwiler =

- Born: September 7, 1948; St. Louis, Missouri, U.S.
- Died: November 19, 1993 (aged 45); Salt Lake City, Utah, U.S.

Comedy career
- Medium: Photography, yacht racing, aerial photography

Tom Leutwiler (September 7, 1948 – November 19, 1993) was a sailing photographer, whose work appeared on the covers of Yachting and Yacht Racing magazines, and was published in Time, Sailing World, Seahorse (England), Voile et Voiles (France) and others for nearly two decades. His dry sense of humor became as much a part of the Leutwiler trademark as his photography.

As founder of Leutwiler Photography, Leutwiler captured moments in sailing with his Hasselblad cameras and produced calendars, sold coast-to-coast, from 1979 to 1990. His aerial photographs have been displayed by CBS News, NBC News, Turner Broadcasting, DuPont, the Audubon Society, E.F. Hutton, Hewlett Packard, Warner Communications, the U.S. Senate and United States House of Representatives, and the White House.

== Early life ==
Leutwiler was born in St. Louis, Missouri to Charles and Virginia Leutwiler, and his heritage traces back to the Leutwil municipality of Switzerland.

Leutwiler grew up in Glendale, Missouri, a suburb of St. Louis, and at the age of 14, he attained the rank of Eagle Scout, the highest rank possible. He graduated from Kirkwood High School in 1966 and participated in the School Newspaper, Chemistry Club, Biology Club, and German Club.

He majored in business at University of Tulsa and Washington University in St. Louis, and served as vice-president of Sales and President of Junior Achievement. Before founding his own business, Leutwiler held a variety of sales positions at the Fuller Brush Company, and Allied Electronics.

== Personal life ==
Leutwiler married in 1978, and lived in Peabody, Massachusetts and Danvers, Massachusetts with his wife and two stepsons Matt and Adam. He operated Leutwiler Photography from home, and members of the family often appeared in the quarterly Shooting the Breeze newsletter and assisted in running the business.

== Leutwiler Photography ==
=== 1973 ===
In June 1973, Leutwiler used a professional 35 mm system to photograph his first sailboat race, the Marblehead, Massachusetts to Halifax, Nova Scotia race. He later stated the "quality was a disaster by my standards today", but as result of this race, Deadelus Photography was born (name changed to Leutwiler Photography in 1979). Leutwiler quickly realized that 35 mm would not produce sufficient images for professional enlargements, and soon made the permanent transition to Hasselblad cameras. He slowly began to find his market, selling his photographs primarily to sailboat owners, crew members, boat manufacturers, sailing magazines, and calendars published by magazines. In a 1987 interview with the St. Louis Post Dispatch, he compared his niche to "selling paper clips to General Motors".

=== 1976 ===
At the Miami-Nassua Race of the 1976 SORC, Leutwiler photographed Love Machine, which many sailors felt was the best action photograph of the period. It appeared as the cover of Yacht Racing Magazine in April 1976, and played a critical role in the building the recognition of the Leutwiler brand name. Wham Bam, Sunset, Tweety, Lonely Sea, and Condor were also published around this time and all became cornerstones of Leutwiler Photography.

=== 1978 ===
By 1978, around 1000 of Leutwiler's photographs had been published nationally in various companies' ads, brochures, and boat show displays. That year, the first edition of Shooting the Breeze was circulated to his client list. Later editions began to incorporate elementws of Leutwiler's humor.

=== 1980–1981 ===
In the Spring 1980 edition of Shooting The Breeze, Leutwiler announced "Here we are in the Spring of 1980 and I thought I would tell you about my first entirely Leutwiler calendar for 1981. We have selected 13 of my best photographs and are currently in production. The printing quality will be superb and I feel it will be the best sailing calendar for 1981." The 1981 calendar sold out, kicking off a highly successful decade-long run.

=== 1982 – 1990 ===
The 1980s were the peak years for Leutwiler Photography, as the annual calendar became a bigger staple of the sailboat racing world with each passing year, and his classic and new portraits continued to be a success. But after nearly twenty years of hard work and devotion, Leutwiler lost his passion and drive for sailboat photography and closed down the business in the 1990, selling off his negatives and camera equipment. He moved to Salt Lake City, Utah in the early 1990s and pursued a variety of other interests including real estate ventures. In 1993, he died in Salt Lake City.

In addition to photographing the event, in 1983 Tom paired up with television producer Stephen H. Schwartz to make "SORC:!983" a video documentary about the six races in the Southern Ocean Racing Conference. The film was sponsored by SEBAGO and was sold in the newly popular VHS and BETAMAX formats. The documentary was narrated by Gary Jobson.

== Sailboat races ==
Below is a partial listing of sailboat races Leutwiler photographed.

Year	Race	Notes
1976	SORC	
1976	Onion Patch/Newport to Bermuda	
1976	Off Soundings	
1977	Key West Race	
1977	SORC	
1977	Marion To Bermuda	
1977	Block Island – Storm Trysail	
1977	Marblehead to Halifax	
1977	Chicago to Mackinac	
1977	Bayview to Mackinac	
1977	LYRA	
1977	Annapolis Fall Series	
1978	SORC	
1978	Onion Patch/Newport to Bermuda	
1978	Bay Week	
1978	Chicago to Mackinac	
1978	Bayview to Mackinac	
1978	Annapolis Fall Series	
1979	SORC	
1979	Block Island – Storm Trysail	
1979	Chicago to Mackinac	
1980	SORC	
1980	New York YC Cruise	
1980	Block Island – Yachting Magazine	
1980	Off Soundings	
1981	SORC	
1981	J-24 Mid Winters	
1981	Block Island – Storm Trysail	
1981	Chicago to Mackinac	
1981	Bayview to Mackinac	
1981	LYRA	
1982	SORC	
1982	Onion Patch/Newport to Bermuda	
1982	Key West Race	
1982	Block Island – Yachting Magazine	
1982	Manhassett Bay Fall Series	
1982	Columbus Day Regatta	
1983	SORC	
1983	Chicago to Mackinac	
1983	Bayview to Mackinac	
1983	Block Island – Storm Trysail	
1984	SORC	
1984	Onion Patch/Newport to Bermuda	
1984	Key West Race	
1984	Block Island – Yachting Magazine	
