= The Kettles in the Ozarks =

1956 American comedy film directed by Charles Lamont

- Directed by: Charles Lamont
- Written by: Kay Lenard
- Based on: The Egg and I by Betty MacDonald
- Produced by: Richard Wilson
- Starring: Marjorie Main; Arthur Hunnicutt; Una Merkel
- Cinematography: George Robinson
- Edited by: Edward Curtiss
- Music by: Joseph Gershenson
- Production company: Universal Pictures
- Distributed by: Universal Pictures
- Release date: March 14, 1956
- Running time: 81 minutes
- Country: United States
- Language: English
- Box office: $1.3 million (US)

The Kettles in the Ozarks is a 1956 American comedy film directed by Charles Lamont. It is the ninth installment of Universal-International's Ma and Pa Kettle series starring Marjorie Main and introducing Arthur Hunnicutt as Sedge, Pa's brother who lives in the Ozarks, replacing Percy Kilbride as Pa.

== Plot ==
With Pa out of the way, Ma and the kids travel to help Pa's brother Sedgewick with his farm in Mournful Hollow, Arkansas. Ma and 13 of her 16 kids waste no time in turning both the train station waiting room and the train's day coach into a complete wreck.

Upon arrival, Ma discovers Sedgwick is at least as lazy as Pa, if not worse. He has also been keeping his fiancé Bedelia waiting for 20 years to marry him. Ma is determined to nudge Sedgwick towards the altar.

Sedgwick is renting out his barn to three men who have "Gangster" written all over them. They are working an illegal moonshine liquor still in the barn. Disposing of the waste product from the still proves problematic. Every time the crooks go into the woods, they have issues with Mother Nature (bears, a hornet's nest, etc.).

When they dispose of the waste at the farm itself, it seeps into the groundwater. The result is a barnyard full of drunk animals.

Ma tricks the gangsters into taking part in a taffy pull contest. The taffy dough has been generously spiked with glue, and the criminals' hands are trapped tight until the authorities come to arrest them.

Sedgwick and Bedelia are married, despite the minister's lips being accidentally glued shut when he tries the tainted taffy.

== Cast ==
- Marjorie Main as Ma Kettle
- Arthur Hunnicutt as Sedgewick Kettle
- Una Merkel as Miss Bedelia Baines
- Ted de Corsia as Professor
- Olive Sturgess as Nancy Kettle
- Richard Eyer as Billy Kettle
- Cheryl Callaway as Suzie Kettle
- Paul Wexler as Reverend Martin
- Richard Deacon as "Big Trout", The Indian
- Pat Goldin as "Small Fry", The Indian
- Sid Tomack as Benny
- Joe Sawyer as Bancroft Baines, Bedelia's Brother
- Bonnie Franklin as Betty Kettle

== See also ==
- List of American films of 1956
