= Janis Carter =

American actress (1913–1994)

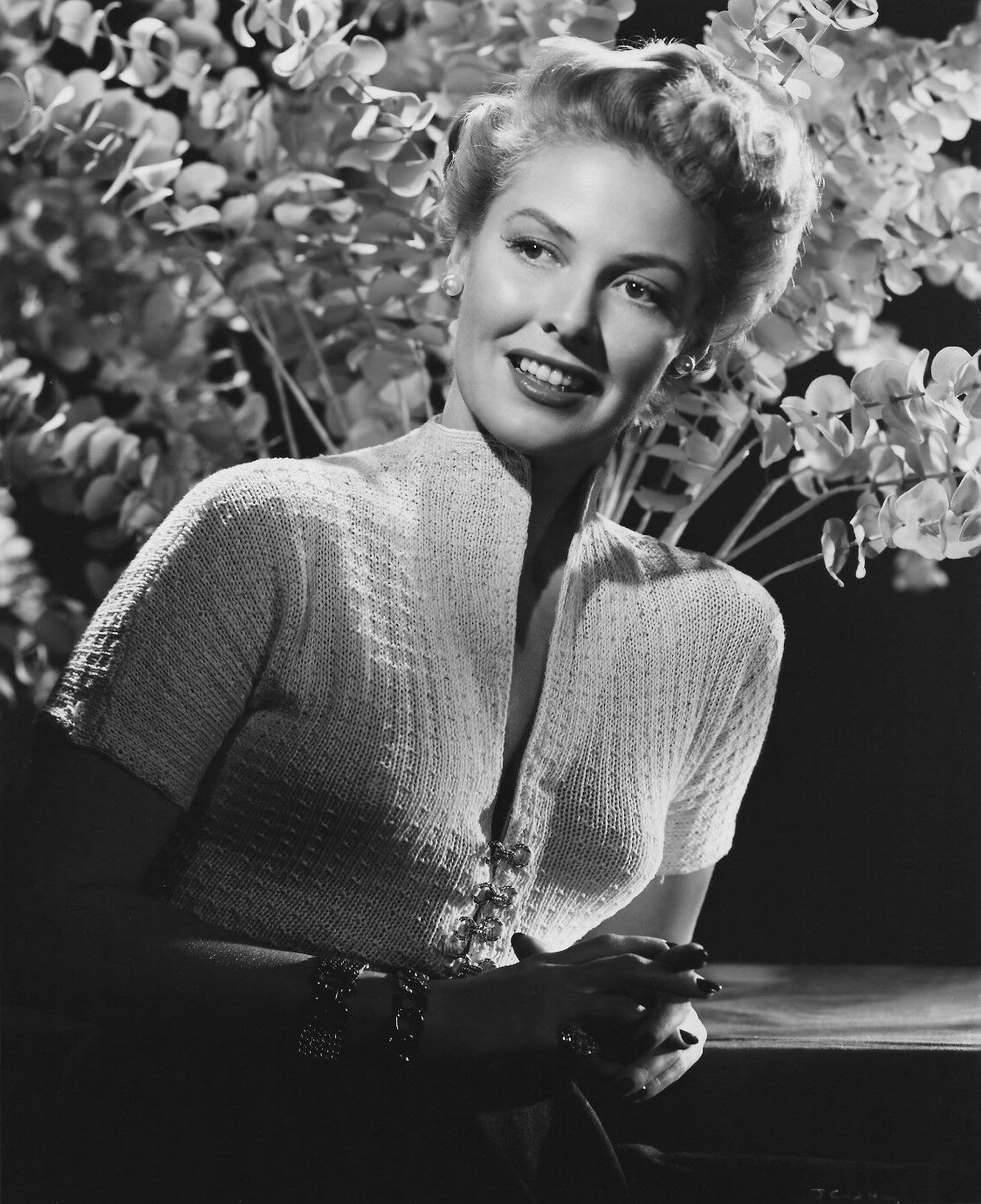
- Carter in 1940s
- Born: Janis Elinore Dremann; October 10, 1913; Cleveland, Ohio, U.S.
- Died: July 30, 1994 (aged 80); Durham, North Carolina, U.S.
- Education: Western Reserve University
- Years active: 1937–1956
- Spouses: Carl Prager (m. 1942; div. 1951) Julius Stulman (m. 1956)

Janis Carter (born Janis Elinore Dremann, October 10, 1913 – July 30, 1994) was an American stage and film actress who performed throughout the 1940s and into the 1950s. During the mid-1950s, she began working regularly on television, co-hosting with Bud Collyer the NBC daytime game show Feather Your Nest.

== Early years ==
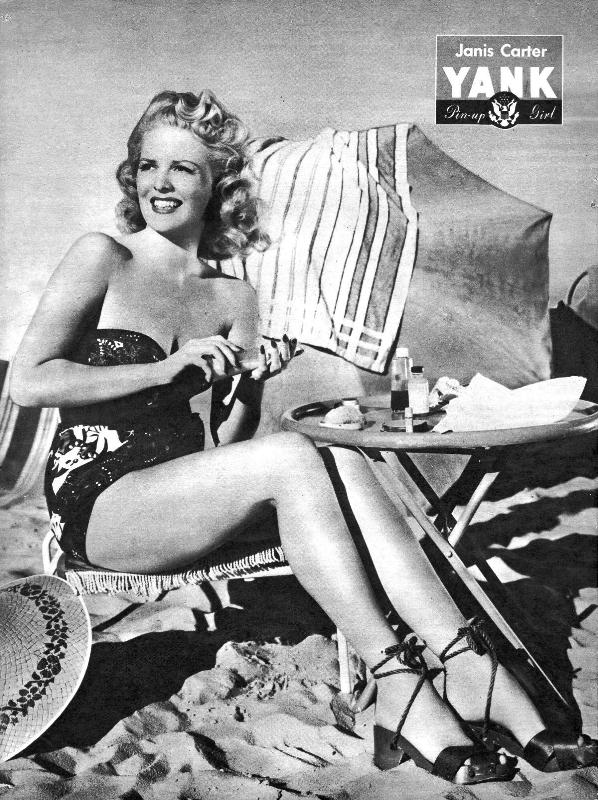
Pin-up photo of Carter for Yank, the Army Weekly in 1945

Carter was born Janis Elinore Dremann in Cleveland, Ohio. When she started her professional career, Dremann changed her last name to Carter, because people had trouble pronouncing and spelling of Dremann, so she chose her grandmother's maiden name as her new last name.

After initial training as a pianist, Carter changed to singing when she was eight years old. Her elementary and secondary education was provided by schools in East Cleveland. After that, she attended Cleveland's Flora Stone Mather College at Western Reserve University, graduating with two degrees – bachelor of arts and bachelor of music. She also participated in dramatics in college.

== Career ==
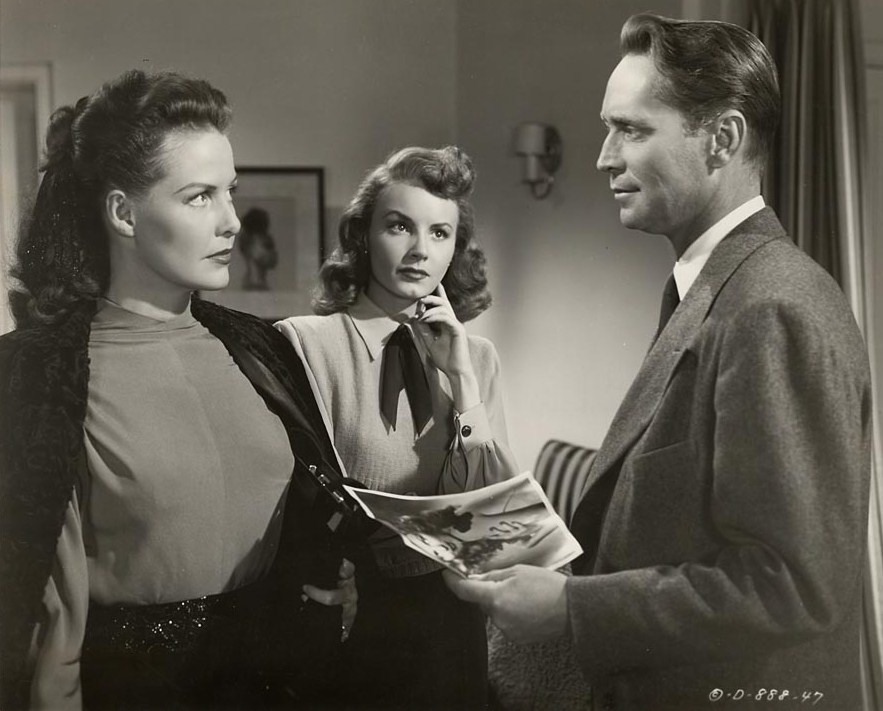
Carter (left), Janet Blair and Franchot Tone in I Love Trouble (1948)

After graduating from college, Carter headed to New York in an attempt to start a career in opera. Although that goal was unsuccessful, she then worked on Broadway, where she was spotted on stage by Darryl F. Zanuck, who signed her to a movie deal. Her Broadway credits included Virginia (1937), Du Barry Was a Lady (1939), and Panama Hattie (1940).

After moving to Hollywood, she appeared in over 30 films beginning in 1941 for 20th Century Fox, MGM, Columbia, and RKO. She appeared in the films Night Editor (1946) and Framed (1947) with Glenn Ford, and Flying Leathernecks (1951) with John Wayne. After leaving Los Angeles, Carter returned to New York and found work in television in comedies and dramas and as hostess for the quiz show Feather Your Nest opposite Bud Collyer. Her last role was in a January 1955 episode of The Elgin Hour.

== Personal life and death ==
Carter married Carl Prager, a musician and composer, in 1942, but they divorced nine years later. She retired from acting in early 1955, after meeting New York lumber and shipping tycoon Julius Stulman; the couple married in 1956. Carter died in 1994, at age 80, from a heart attack in Durham, North Carolina.

== Partial filmography ==
- Cadet Girl (1941) - Mary Moore
- Secret Agent of Japan (1942) - Doris Poole
- Who Is Hope Schuyler? (1942) - Vesta Hadden
- I Married an Angel (1942) - Sufi
- Just Off Broadway (1942) - Lillian Hubbard
- Girl Trouble (1942) - Virginia
- Thunder Birds (1942) - Blonde Red Cross Nurse Trainee
- That Other Woman (1942) - Constance Powell
- Lady of Burlesque (1943) - Janine
- Swing Out the Blues (1943) - Dena Marshall
- The Ghost That Walks Alone (1944) - Enid Turner
- The Girl in the Case (a.k.a. The Silver Key) (1944) - Myra Warner
- The Mark of the Whistler (a.k.a. The Marked Man) (1944) - Patricia Henley
- One Mysterious Night (1944) - Dorothy Anderson
- The Missing Juror (1944) - Alice Hill
- Together Again (1944) - Miss Thorn (uncredited)
- The Power of the Whistler (1945) - Jean Lang
- A Thousand and One Nights (1945) - Harem Girl (uncredited)
- The Fighting Guardsman (1946) - Christine Roualt
- One Way to Love (1946) - Josie Hart
- The Notorious Lone Wolf (1946) - Carla Winter
- Night Editor (a.k.a. The Trespasser) (1946) - Jill Merrill
- Framed (1947) - Paula Craig
- I Love Trouble (1948) - Ligia Caprillo aka Jane Breeger aka Janie Joy
- Her Wonderful Lie (1948)
- Slightly French (1949) - Louisa Gayle
- Addio Mimí! (1949) - Jeanette
- Miss Grant Takes Richmond (1949) - Peggy Donato
- I Married a Communist (a.k.a. The Woman on Pier 13) (1949) - Christine Norman
- And Baby Makes Three (1950) - Wanda York
- A Woman of Distinction (1950) - Teddy Evans
- The Woman on Pier 13 (1950) - Christine Norman
- Santa Fe (1951) - Judith Chandler
- My Forbidden Past (1951) - Corinne Lucas
- Flying Leathernecks (1951) - Joan Kirby
- The Half-Breed (1952) - Helen Dowling
- The Sergeant and the Spy (1953) (in German)
- Double Profile (1954) (in German)
