= The Woman on Pier 13 =

1949 film by Robert Stevenson

- Theatrical release poster
- Directed by: Robert Stevenson
- Screenplay by: Robert Hardy Andrews; Charles Grayson
- Story by: George W. George; George F. Slavin
- Produced by: Jack J. Gross
- Starring: Laraine Day; Robert Ryan; John Agar
- Cinematography: Nicholas Musuraca
- Edited by: Roland Gross
- Music by: Leigh Harline
- Distributed by: RKO Pictures
- Release dates: October 7, 1949 (Preview-Los Angeles); June 3, 1950 (US)
- Running time: 73 minutes
- Country: United States
- Language: English

The Woman on Pier 13 is a 1949 American film noir drama starring Laraine Day, Robert Ryan, and John Agar, with Thomas Gomez and Janis Carter in support. Directed by Robert Stevenson, the RKO release previewed in Los Angeles and San Francisco in 1949 under the title I Married a Communist but, owing to poor polling among preview audiences, this was dropped prior to its 1950 release.

== Plot ==
Brad Collins, a San Francisco shipping executive, has recently married Nan Lowry after a whirlwind one-week courtship. During their honeymoon the couple meets Christine Norman, an old flame of Brad's whom Nan immediately dislikes.

Brad had once been a stevedore in New York, but rose from the San Francisco waterfront to become a respected shipping firm vice president, prized for his experience on both sides of the trade. He is also a former member of the U.S. Communist Party, living under an alias.

As a result, Brad becomes the target of the San Francisco Communist cell led by Vanning, who orders an informant drowned in front of him to demonstrate the stakes. After threatening to reveal Brad's real name - Frank Johnson - and his potential responsibility for a murder as a former Communist party strongarm, Vanning tells him it is impossible to leave the party, and orders him to sabotage labor negotiations in the Bay Area shipping industry by resisting union demands in a labor dispute. Christine, bitter over being rejected years ago by Brad, is ordered to become closer to his young and impressionable brother-in-law, Don Lowry, and to indoctrinate him with a Communist world view. Christine falls in love with Lowry, despite Vanning demanding she not be so emotional.

Brad's friend and former boyfriend of Nan, union leader Jim Travers, cannot understand why Brad has become so unreasonable to deal with. Travers is concerned about the possibility of the small number of highly resourceful Communists in the union being able to take it over, and suspects Christine of being one. He discusses this with Lowry, by then an active union member. Lowry denies Christine's politics. Lowry confronts her and she confesses, but counters Lowry’s rejection by showing him a photograph of her and Brad together, and a copy of his party membership card as Frank Johnson. Vanning interrupts them, angry with Christine for breaking orders and coming back ahead of schedule from a business trip. He treats Lowry brusquely, then orders his murder by a contract killer.

Lowry heads for the Collins' residence to inform them of what he has learned, but is run over by a car driven by hit man Bailey. Nan, previously informed by Christine that her brother is in danger, tries to convince her husband that Lowry's killing was not an accident. He pretends to be unconvinced. Confronting Christine on her own, Nan is told of her husband's past, and informed that Bailey was responsible for Lowry's death. Preparing a suicide note, Christine is interrupted by Vanning. He thinks this is a good solution, but wishes to hide her reasons, so destroys her confession of Communist involvement and has her thrown out the window of her high-rise apartment.

Turning detective, Nan seeks out Bailey and pretends she’s looking for a killer for hire to eliminate her own husband. Her ruse is foiled and she is abducted and taken to the Communist headquarters on the waterfront. Brad tracks his wife down and forces his way in. In a shootout Bailey and Vanning are killed, and Brad fatally wounded. In his last moments he tells Nan her ex-beau Travers was always the right man for her. Nan says she still loves him as he dies in her arms.

== Cast ==
- Laraine Day as Nan Lowry Collins
- Robert Ryan as Brad Collins, aka Frank Johnson
- John Agar as Don Lowry
- Thomas Gomez as Vanning
- Janis Carter as Christine Norman
- Richard Rober as Jim Travers
- William Talman as Bailey, contract killer
- Paul Guilfoyle as Ralston

== Production ==
The original story forming the basis of the film by Slavin and George was first optioned then rejected by Eagle-Lion. It was announced in early September 1948 as RKO's first production following Howard Hughes takeover of the studio.

Hughes reputedly offered the script to directors as a test for presumed communist leanings. Director Joseph Losey would claim the film was a “touchstone for establishing who was not a "red": you offered [it]... to anybody you thought was a communist, and if they turned it down, they were.” According to Losey, thirteen directors turned down the film including himself, though this number has since been disputed.^{[5]} John Cromwell said it was the worst film script he had ever read,^{[6]} while Nicholas Ray departed shortly before production began. Rewrites were frequent and extensive, and the script had to pass through many hands before a final draft was constructed, including those of Art Cohn, James Edward Grant, Charles Grayson and Herman Mankiewicz. The script was still considered incomplete even with these contributions, leading RKO to bring on veteran screenwriter Robert Hardy Andrews to polish what would become the final iteration of the screenplay. The completed script contained significantly less political messaging, and leaned much closer to a traditional melodrama. To add to these difficulties, there was considerable turnover among the cast as well. Merle Oberon was reportedly on salary as the film's female lead for several months before RKO announced that she would be replaced by Jane Greer, who was again quickly moved to a different production. In January of 1949, Paul Lukas was reportedly brought on to play the communist leader. He collected nearly $50,000 before RKO moved on from him in March.^{[8]} Production began in April 1949 under Robert Stevenson and lasted a month.^{[9]} Hughes and RKO took great lengths to ensure the credibility of the film's anti-communist messaging, going so far as to contact Luis J Russel, an ex-FBI agent and HUAC investigator, for genuine Communist Party cards to use as models for the prop cards employed in a communist meeting scene. Some of RKO’s early plans for the film even included a prologue by communist informant Elizabeth Bentley, who would introduce the film with a “carefully written” speech. Newsreel footage of J. Edgar Hoover was requested, but denied because the FBI feared "persons of communist sympathies" would seek to undermine the project's intentions.^{[5]} Robert Ryan, a liberal, was the only available contracted RKO actor and only agreed to be cast out of fear for his career.^{[10]}

The initial local release disappointed expectations as showings in Los Angeles and San Francisco grossed about 40-50 percent below the average. In response, Hughes announced a delay in “the national release” of the film on October 14, 1949. While Hughes still insisted the title I Married a Communist was the most marketable aspect of the picture, his staff maintained the title must be changed, and a lengthy search was begun. Hughes' reluctance made the decision difficult. After scores of rejections, the title was officially announced as The Woman on Pier 13 in January 1950.^{[4]} The film's final certified cost came to $831,360.

== Reception ==
=== Box-office ===
The film was a commercial failure at the box-office, and recorded a loss of $650,000.

=== Critical reception ===
A contemporary Variety magazine review was tepid: "As a straight action fare, I Married a Communist generates enough tension to satisfy the average customer. Despite its heavy sounding title, pic hews strictly to tried and true meller formula ... Pic is so wary of introducing any political gab that at one point when Commie trade union tactics are touched upon, the soundtrack is dropped."

In 2000, Dennis Schwartz's Ozus review questioned the film's veracity: "The story was filled with misinformation: it distorted the communist influence in the country and how big business and unions act. It attempted to make a propaganda film that reaffirms the American way of life and familial love, but at the expense of reality."

In 2009 the British critic Tom Milne in the Time Out Film Guide wrote: "The sterling cast can make no headway against cartoon characters, a fatuous script that defies belief, and an enveloping sense of hysteria. Nick Musuraca's noir-ish camerawork, mercifully, is stunning."

Identifying The Woman on Pier 13 as an "amalgam of propaganda and noir", Jeff Smith wrote in 2014 that it was paradoxical "to use film to build political consensus" by borrowing "devices and storytelling strategies from the bleakest and most pessimistic films Hollywood ever made".
