= Abandoned (1949 film) =

1949 film by Joseph M. Newman

- Theatrical release poster
- Directed by: Joseph M. Newman (as Joe Newman)
- Written by: Irwin Gielgud; William Bowers (additional dialogue)
- Produced by: Jerry Bresler
- Starring: Dennis O'Keefe; Gale Storm; Jeff Chandler
- Cinematography: William H. Daniels
- Edited by: Edward Curtiss
- Music by: Walter Scharf (uncredited)
- Color process: Black and white
- Production company: Universal International
- Distributed by: Universal Pictures
- Release date: October 6, 1949 (Detroit)
- Running time: 79 minutes
- Country: United States
- Language: English

Abandoned is a 1949 American crime film noir starring Dennis O'Keefe, Gale Storm and Jeff Chandler.

Directed by Joseph M. Newman, it is also known as Abandoned Women and Not Wanted.

== Plot ==
After her sister goes missing in Los Angeles, a woman tries to find information about the disappearance at city hall. The police are not helpful, but she does get support from a local crime reporter. As the two investigate the disappearance together, they are led to a shady detective and a black-market baby ring.

== Cast ==
- Dennis O'Keefe as Mark Sitko
- Gale Storm as Paula Considine
- Jeff Chandler as Chief MacRae
- Meg Randall as Dottie Jensen
- Raymond Burr as Kerric
- Marjorie Rambeau as Mrs. Donner
- Jeanette Nolan as Major Ross
- Mike Mazurki as Hoppe
- Will Kuluva as "Little Guy" Decola
- David Clarke as Harry
- William Frambes as Scoop (as William Page)
- Sid Tomack as Mr. Humes
- Perc Launders as Dowd
- Steve Darrell as Brenn
- Clifton Young as Eddie
- Ruth Sanderson as Mrs. Spence

== Production ==
The film uses a semi-documentary style of presentation that was popular at the time. It was based on an original story by Irwin Gielgud commissioned by producer Jerry Bresler. Director Joseph M. Newman and Bresler had previously worked together in the shorts department at MGM. Ann Blyth was originally announced for the female lead.

It was shot on the Universal backlot and on location in Los Angeles.

Jeff Chandler made the film before Broken Arrow. However, after being cast in that film, he was given star billing for Abandoned.

== Reception ==
A. H. Weiler's New York Times review was mixed: "But despite the advertisements, the newcomer is far from being 'the year's most sensational picture.' Sensational is hardly the word, since it is, in the main, a briskly paced thriller that merely indicates an insidious evil and then proceeds along conventional melodramatic lines to the climactic smashing of a baby adoption ring. As such it is a routine cops-and-mobsters number....Gale Storm is natural and engaging as the harried young lady who manages to rescue her niece, if not her sister. However, Dennis O'Keefe, as the brash, fearless and charming newspaper man and her romantic partner seems closer to fiction than fact. Jeff Chandler turns in a competent characterization as the D.A., as do...Rambeau, Kuluva, Burr, and...Randall."

Clive Hirschhorn's 1983 history of Universal Pictures also raised an eyebrow at the film's ad campaign boosting it to be "the year's most sensational picture" and reported: "Abandoned was nothing of the sort. What it turned out to be was a melodramatic throwback to the thirties when, about every second week or so, the studio exposed some kind of racket or another."

In his Dark City: The Film Noir, Spencer Selby calls Abandoned a "standard exposé melodrama with (an) effective noir look."

Leonard Maltin gives the film two and a half stars (out of four), calling it a "pretty good grade-B crime drama" and noting that Burr makes "an impressive heavy."

Critic and film historian Carl Macek acknowledged that the film is "first and foremost a sensationalized melodrama," but it contains several elements that allow it "to function as a film noir, most significantly William Daniels photography... which iumbued Los Angeles with a sinister, almost surreal, visual malevolence. The low-key vision of slick, rain-dampened streets and oblique vertical chiaroscuro lighting created an atmosphere that underscores the noir developments of the narrative."

Abandoned has been shown on the Turner Classic Movies show, "Noir Alley," hosted by Eddie Muller.

This was Chandler's first film for Universal under a long-term contract, and the positive response to his performance began his graduation into leading roles.

== See also ==
- List of American films of 1949
