= Miss Grant Takes Richmond =

1949 film by Lloyd Bacon

- Directed by: Lloyd Bacon
- Screenplay by: Devery Freeman; Nat Perrin; Frank Tashlin
- Story by: Everett Freeman
- Produced by: S. Sylvan Simon
- Starring: Lucille Ball; William Holden; Janis Carter; James Gleason; Gloria Henry; Frank McHugh
- Cinematography: Charles Lawton Jr.
- Edited by: Jerome Thoms
- Music by: Heinz Roemheld
- Production company: Columbia Pictures
- Distributed by: Columbia Pictures
- Release date: September 20, 1949
- Running time: 87 minutes
- Country: United States
- Language: English

Miss Grant Takes Richmond is a 1949 American comedy film directed by Lloyd Bacon, and starring Lucille Ball, William Holden, and Janis Carter, and produced and distributed by Columbia Pictures. It was released under the alternative title Innocence Is Bliss in Britain.

== Plot ==
For Ellen Grant, the worst student at the Woodruff Secretarial School, it comes as a great surprise when Dick Richmond hires her to work at his realty company. Actually, it is her apparent empty-headedness that has won her the job. The real estate firm, and now Ellen, are merely fronts for a bookmaking operation run from the back of the office, where Dick and his associates, Gleason and Kilcoyne, take bets on races.

Ellen is distressed when she watches as her uncle, Judge Ben Grant, is forced to rule in favor of landlord Roscoe Johnson in eviction proceedings against several of her friends. There is an acute shortage of low-cost housing, exacerbated by Johnson's plans to tear down what he has and rebuild more expensive units.

To avoid raising Ellen's suspicions, Dick mentions that he cannot purchase some land offered because $60,000 is too high a price, but that he would for $55,000. Ellen goes to the vendors without authorization and negotiates the price down to $50,000. When she returns to the office with the news, accompanied by the seller and Ellen's boyfriend, Assistant District Attorney Ralph Winton, Dick has to play along. Little does she know her plans to construct affordable housing are driving Dick's organization into financial trouble. He cannot fire her without questions being asked, so he tries being aggressively romantic with her. This backfires, however: both he and Ellen find themselves enjoying embracing and kissing.

Young widow Mrs. Peggy Donato comes to see her old flame, Dick, to try to get him to run her much larger bookmaking operation (inherited from her late husband). She and Ellen soon detest each other. Dick's trouble really begins when Ellen unwittingly takes a bet from Mrs. Donato on a fixed race, putting Dick in debt to her for $50,000. Mrs. Donato, who would rather have Dick than the winnings, tells him that if he does not go away with her or pay her, her gang will deal with him.

To raise the money, Dick lets Ellen take charge of the housing development, having Kilcoyne embezzle enough funds from down payments on the new homes. When the funds run out before the homes are built, she accepts full responsibility, believing that her own incompetence was to blame. Seeing the girl he has come to love suffer, Dick decides to go away with Mrs. Donato and use the $50,000 he can now keep to complete the project. He, Ellen, Gleason and Kilcoyne stage a fake accident at Roscoe Johnson's building site to blackmail him into giving up the building supplies and machinery he has been monopolizing, and the development is finished.

Ellen discovers the truth behind the missing money and the betting racket, but forgives Dick and cooks up a scheme to force Mrs. Donato to leave Dick alone, pretending to be the brains behind the bookmaking operation, backed by her own "gang". Peggy's men, however, are too tough. Just in time, Gleason and Kilcoyne show up with the $50,000, won by a bet placed with Mrs. Donato's own organization. Dick and Ellen embrace.

== Cast ==
- Lucille Ball as Ellen Grant
- William Holden as Dick Richmond
- Janis Carter as Peggy Donato
- James Gleason as Timothy P. Gleason
- Gloria Henry as Helen White
- Frank McHugh as Mr. Kilcoyne
- George Cleveland as Judge Ben Grant
- Stephen Dunne as Ralph Winton

== Notes ==
Ball was at the peak of her pre-television movie career. In the late 1940s, Ball had a string of hit comedies such as Sorrowful Jones with Bob Hope and The Fuller Brush Girl (1950) with Eddie Albert, her first major release showcasing her talent for physical comedy. It would be two years before her super-stardom on television in I Love Lucy. Holden's career, like Ball's, would blossom in the 1950s. He was just a year away from filming Billy Wilder's movie Sunset Boulevard.
