= I Love Trouble (1948 film) =

1948 film by S. Sylvan Simon

- Film poster
- Directed by: S. Sylvan Simon
- Screenplay by: Roy Huggins
- Based on: The Double Take; 1943 novel by Roy Huggins
- Produced by: S. Sylvan Simon
- Starring: Franchot Tone; Janet Blair; Janis Carter
- Cinematography: Charles Lawton Jr.
- Edited by: Al Clark
- Music by: George Duning
- Production company: Cornell Pictures
- Distributed by: Columbia Pictures
- Release date: January 15, 1948 (United States)
- Running time: 95 minutes
- Country: United States
- Language: English

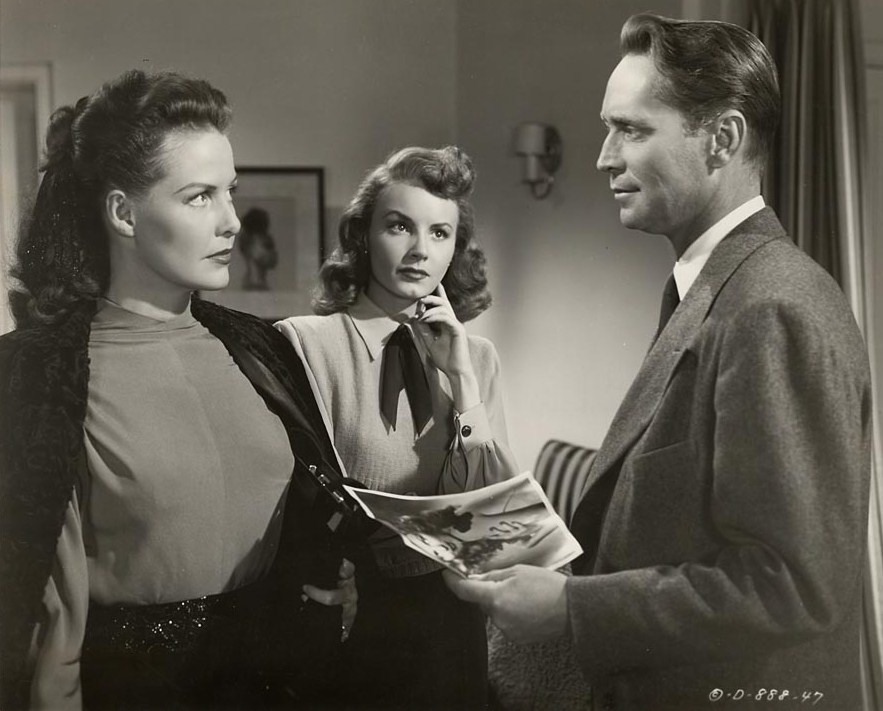
Janis Carter, Janet Blair and Franchot Tone

I Love Trouble is a 1948 American film noir crime film written by Roy Huggins from his first novel The Double Take, directed by S. Sylvan Simon, and starring Franchot Tone as Stuart Bailey. The character of Stuart Bailey was later portrayed by Efrem Zimbalist, Jr. in the television series 77 Sunset Strip.

== Plot ==
A wealthy politician, Ralph Johnson, hires detective Stuart Bailey to investigate his missing wife's background. Bailey discovers that the wife had been a dancer under her maiden name of Jane Breeger and had left her Oregon home town with Buster Buffin, a nightclub entertainer, who tells him Jane changed her name to Janie Joy and enrolled at UCLA. Buffin is killed before Bailey can question him further.

Norma Shannon shows up, looking for her sister Jane, but when Bailey shows her a photograph of the missing woman, Norma says it is not her. Bailey learns that the wife had used stolen papers from a girlfriend to enter college after she stole $40,000 from the club where she worked, owned by a man named Keller.

Bailey eventually learns that Johnson had discovered her past and, in order to avoid a scandal, had hired Bailey as part of an elaborate scheme to kill his wife and frame the detective.

== Cast ==
- Franchot Tone as Stuart Bailey
- Janet Blair as Norma Shannon
- Janis Carter as Mrs. Caprillo aka Jane Breeger aka Janie Joy
- Adele Jergens as Boots Nestor
- Glenda Farrell as Hazel Bixby
- Steven Geray as Keller
- Tom Powers as Ralph Johnson
- Lynn Merrick as Mrs. Johnson
- John Ireland as Reno
- Sid Tomack as Buster Buffin (uncredited)
- Donald Curtis as Martin
- Eduardo Ciannelli as John Vega Caprillo
- Robert Barrat as Lt. Quint
- Raymond Burr as Herb
- Garry Owen as Gus (uncredited)

== Production ==
The novel and screenplay were written by Roy Huggins, and show the comedic sophistication evident in his subsequent work. Huggins later created numerous landmark television series such as Maverick starring James Garner, The Fugitive starring David Janssen, The Rockford Files starring Garner, and 77 Sunset Strip starring Efrem Zimbalist, Jr. as Stuart Bailey. I Love Trouble was Huggins' first attempt at writing a narrative film.

In Huggins' Archive of American Television interview, he notes that I Love Trouble was somehow lost and had not been seen anywhere for decades and never run on television. The film has since been found and screened in venues such as the Museum of Modern Art in New York City. It was shown on the Turner Classic Movies show 'Noir Alley' with Eddie Muller on September 24, 2022.

== See also ==
- List of American films of 1948
- Public domain film
- List of films in the public domain in the United States
