= Framed (1947 film) =

1947 film by Richard Wallace

- Theatrical release poster
- Directed by: Richard Wallace
- Screenplay by: Ben Maddow
- Story by: John Patrick
- Produced by: Jules Schermer
- Starring: Glenn Ford; Janis Carter; Barry Sullivan
- Cinematography: Burnett Guffey
- Edited by: Richard Fantl
- Music by: Marlin Skiles
- Color process: Black and white
- Production company: Columbia Pictures
- Distributed by: Columbia Pictures
- Release date: May 25, 1947
- Running time: 82 minutes
- Country: United States
- Language: English

Framed is a 1947 American crime film noir directed by Richard Wallace and starring Glenn Ford, Janis Carter and Barry Sullivan. Edgar Buchanan, Karen Morley, and Jim Bannon appear in support. The picture was released by Columbia Pictures, and is generally praised by critics as an effective crime thriller despite its low budget.

== Plot ==
Naïve mining engineer Mike Lambert (Glenn Ford) takes a temporary job driving a truck. When the brakes fail while coming down a steep grade, he steers his way through a small town and is lucky to just dent the pickup of Jeff Cunningham (Edgar Buchanan). Jeff demands Mike's employer pay for the damage, but the man refuses. Mike pays Jeff himself. Later, the police find Mike in a bar and arrest him for reckless driving and having an expired license. A total stranger, barmaid and local femme fatale Paula Craig (Janis Carter), pays his $50 fine. When Mike gets drunk, Paula quits her job and finds him a hotel room. Then she meets with her conspirator, Steve Price (Barry Sullivan), and tells him she found a stranger with the same height and build as Steve but who also has no personal connections in the town.

The next day, Mike goes looking for a job. The clerk at the assay office puts him in touch with Jeff, a prospector who has found a rich vein in an old, abandoned silver mine. He offers to cut Mike in for 10%, a generous offer Mike quickly accepts. However, Mike makes the mistake of telling Paula all about it. When Jeff goes to get financing from Steve, the vice-president of the Empire Bank, Paula gets him to turn Jeff down.

An opportunist, Steve obtained his position through his wife Beth's father. He has embezzled $250,000 from the bank and hidden it in Paula's safety deposit box. The plan to abscond with it involves Mike's body to be mistaken for Steve's in a fiery fatal car crash.

Mike wins some money in craps and pays Paula back everything she spent on him. He saw her get in the car with Steve, and is very suspicious of a barmaid with so much money. Paula tells him she persuaded Steve to reconsider Jeff's financing and gullible Mike falls for the lie.

Mike, Steve and Paula drive out to see the mine. On the way back, Steve persuades Mike to stop for a drink at his place. However, when Mike goes to wash his hands, he notices a bath robe with the name "Paula" embroidered on it. Still not willing to open his eyes and recognize the danger he is in, Mike gets drunk and passes out. Steve drives him to the spot chosen for the accident, but Paula knocks Steve out instead of Mike and sends the car - and Steve - over a cliff. She is able to convince Mike that he accidentally killed Steve in a drunken rage and that she staged the accident to cover for him. She begs him to run away with her. Mike then learns that the authorities know Steve was killed and Jeff has been accused of his murder. After going to see Jeff in jail, Mike suspects Paula, but has no proof. He goes to question Mrs. Woodworth, Steve's secretary, pretending to be a reporter. She confirms that a Helen Bailey called while Jeff was meeting Steve. Mrs. Woodworth's suspicious husband calls the police, but Mike punches him and gets away.

Mike asks Paula if she knows Helen Bailey but she denies it; however, her shocked look tells him that the name was her alias. She leaves and heads to the bank to get the money. Mike follows her there and confronts her. She begs him to go with her, but he turns her down. The police, tipped off by Mike, place her under arrest.

== Cast ==
- Glenn Ford as Mike Lambert
- Janis Carter as Paula Craig
- Barry Sullivan as Steve Price
- Edgar Buchanan as Jeff Cunningham
- Karen Morley as Beth Price
- Jim Bannon as Jack Woodworth
- Barbara Woodell as Jane Woodworth

== Reception ==
=== Critical response ===
Film critic Dennis Schwartz liked the film and wrote in a 2001 review, "Janis Carter gives a very sexy and dangerous performance, which plays off very well against Glenn Ford's very earnest one of the good guys who can't get a lucky break. Even when he finds someone he could love she turns out to be poison, someone who was about to poison his coffee until she was reassured that he does not know something incriminating about her role in the crime. It was an entertaining B-film that ably caught how an honest but desperate man reacts after hooking up with a falsehearted woman. The good performances overcame the cheap production values and slight story."

In an undated review at Allmovie, Critic Mark Deming called the film, "[a] superior low-budget film noir."

Film critic Hans J. Wollstein also wrote in an undated Allmovie review, "... Framed remains a thrilling example of 1940s film noir at its best: economically told, atmospherically photographed (at, among other places, Lake Arrowhead) and more than competently acted. Carter, especially, is a revelation and it is too bad that she was mostly used by Columbia Pictures for decorative purposes, a sort of second-tier Rita Hayworth."
