= The Fuller Brush Girl =

1950 film by Lloyd Bacon

- Directed by: Lloyd Bacon
- Written by: Frank Tashlin
- Produced by: S. Sylvan Simon
- Starring: Lucille Ball
- Cinematography: Charles Lawton Jr.
- Edited by: William Lyon
- Music by: Heinz Roemheld
- Distributed by: Columbia Pictures
- Release dates: August 20, 1950; September 28, 1950 (Los Angeles); October 5, 1950 (New York)
- Running time: 85 minutes
- Country: United States
- Language: English

The Fuller Brush Girl is a 1950 slapstick comedy starring Lucille Ball directed by Lloyd Bacon and written by Frank Tashlin. Ball plays a quirky door-to-door cosmetics saleswoman for the Fuller Brush Company. The film reunited Ball with Bacon, producer S. Sylvan Simon and Tashlin from the 1949 film Miss Grant Takes Richmond.

== Plot ==
Sally, a switchboard operator, and her boyfriend Humphrey, a shy office boy, work together at a steamship company. They plan to marry and hope to be able to afford monthly payments on a house that they have long wanted to purchase. After their boss Harvey Simpson fires his cargo supervisor, Sally urges Humphrey to petition Harvey for the job, and to Humphrey's surprise, he is hired. Simpson is secretly involved in a smuggling operation and schemes to use Humphrey as an oblivious patsy before firing him after one day on the job. Thrilled with the promotion, Sally and Humphrey are now able to place a down payment on the house.

Sally, while talking with a friend who works for the Fuller Brush Company, accidentally destroys the switchboard and covers Simpson with Fuller Brush powder, and she is fired. She decides to apply for her own Fuller Brush franchise, but she requires a reference from her former employer. Borrowing her friend's kit, Sally seeks to prove that she would be a good saleswoman without having to obtain the reference.

Simpson's wife Claire, smelling the powder on her husband, accuses him of infidelity. Simpson begs Humphrey to have Sally attest to his version of events. A woman claiming to be Sally enters the Simpson home and kills Claire. When Sally arrives at the house, the intruder knocks Sally unconscious. Humphrey rescues her from the house just before the police can find her there, but Sally, who believes that it was Claire who had struck her, becomes the prime suspect.

Sally spots an advertisement for a burlesque show featuring a dancer whom Sally recognizes as the woman who had slugged her. Humphrey inadvertently crosses paths with a gunman at the steamship company office. The man shoots at Humphrey and misses before fleeing, but he has already killed Simpson. Sally sees a photo of Simpson's wife on his desk and realizes that it was not she who had struck her but the dancer, Ruby Rawlings.

Sally and Humphrey pursue Ruby to her theater, where Sally masquerades as a dancer and is forced to take the stage. They follow Ruby onto a departing ocean liner, and Humphrey becomes aware of his unwitting role in the smuggling enterprise. Sally and Humphrey are chased around the ship by a criminal gang trying to silence them, while they leap out a porthole into the ship's hold and then hide in rooms filled with leaky wine barrels, bunches of bananas and a pair of talking parrots who nearly reveal their location. The main container of smuggled merchandise has been booby-trapped with explosives, and when Sally unknowingly threatens them with it, the terrified criminals jump overboard. The explosion attracts the harbor police, and, locked in an embrace, Sally and Humphrey barely notice the explosion.

== Cast ==
- Lucille Ball as Sally Elliot
- Eddie Albert as Humphrey Briggs
- Carl Benton Reid as Mr. Christy
- Gale Robbins as Ruby Rawlings
- Jeff Donnell as Jane Bixby
- Jerome Cowan as Harvey Simpson
- John Litel as Mr. Watkins
- Fred Graham as Rocky Mitchell
- Lee Patrick as Claire Simpson
- Arthur Space as Insp. Rodgers
- Mel Blanc as two parrots (voice only)
- Barbara Pepper as Woman Watching TV
- Red Skelton as Fuller Brush Man

== Reception ==
In a contemporary review for The New York Times, critic Howard Thompson called The Fuller Brush Girl a "familiar, simple-minded little comedy" and wrote: "The spirited Miss Ball scrambles bravely through this foolishness ... Only in one scene does the picture sparkle—when Miss Ball pursues the murderers to a burlesque theatre and rigs herself up as a performer. Basically a fine comedienne. she does a truly hilarious take-off on one of these uninhibited artists, complete with swivel glide, gum churning and Theda Bara make-up. Otherwise, in "The Fuller Brush Girl" Columbia has slipped Miss Ball and her audiences a mickey."

Critic John L. Scott of the Los Angeles Times wrote: "[T]he film escapes right out of this world. Miss Ball dominates the farce, appearing in almost every scene, and it's a good thing she does. The production, directed by Lloyd Bacon, is rowdy with Keystone Kop trimmings. It has some hilarious situations and gags. ... Miss Ball carries the ball for a comedy touchdown in this one."
