= Harold P. Burdick =

American journalist, actor, and writer (died 1978)

Harold Peleg Burdick (October 14, 1893 – June 12, 1978) was an American journalist, actor, and writer.

== Early years ==
Born in Osceola, Wisconsin, Burdick was the son of Mr. and Mrs. H. P. Burdick. He grew up in Tacoma, Washington, and graduated from Stadium High School in 1911. He initially planned to be an attorney like his father, but participation in theatrical productions at the University of Washington (UW) turned his interest to acting. He gained additional experience with stock companies during summer vacations He graduated from UW planning on a career in the theater, but World War I changed his plans.

== Military service ==
During World War I, Burdick served as a lieutenant in the Fifteenth Artillery. He was a member of the Washington Coast Artillery, National Guard for six years before the United States entered the war. After joining the U. S. military, he attended training school for artillery officers at Fort Monroe, Virginia. He was promoted to lieutenant while serving in France in 1918.

== Career ==
Burdick was a print journalist for 15 years, working for the Associated Press in the eastern United States and as a reporter, feature editor, and city editor at The Seattle Times. His other newspaper roles included editorial writer, drama and music critic, art editor, and being in charge of Sunday magazines and rotogravure sections.

When he lived in Seattle, Burdick was the director of the Wilkes Stock Company. He also was director and stage manager of a Vancouver, British Columbia, stock company. Burdick's work on stage included performing in Anniversary Waltz, The Apple Cart, Auntie Mame, Calculated Risk, Death of a Salesman, The Ivory Branch, and Solid Gold Cadillac.

Burdick's radio debut occurred in 1932, when he was master of ceremonies for a broadcast of the NBC Spotlight Revue during a broadcast from the Seattle Auto Show. He became a newscaster at KOMO radio in Seattle, and while there he began a series, Do You Believe in Ghosts? The program's sponsors had Burdick move to San Francisco to continue the series there. His other radio creations included Night Editor, in which he starred for 12 years, beginning on KPO on September 12, 1934. He also wrote Dr. Kate, a soap opera on which he and his wife, Cornelia, acted.

Burdick wrote for the television version of Night Editor and portrayed Judge Grant on the TV soap opera The Edge of Night.

Burdick also wrote short stories for magazines, and "true stories of the sea".

== Personal life and death ==
Burdick died on June 12, 1978, in the Hospital for Joint Diseases, aged 84. His son, Hal "Bud" Burdick Jr. was also an actor and director.
