= Fuller Brush Company =

American personal care and cleaning products company

- Type: Privately held subsidiary (since 2007)
- Industry: manufacturing
- Founded: Hartford, Connecticut, US; 1906; 120 years ago
- Founder: Alfred Fuller
- Headquarters: Lakewood, New Jersey, US
- Key people: Alfred Fuller; Howard Fuller; Avard E. Fuller
- Products: Branded and private label products for personal care, as well as for commercial and household cleaning
- Parent: Sara Lee (1968–1989); Privately held (1989–1994); CPAC Inc. (1994–2012); Victory Park Capital and David Sabin (2012–2017); Galaxy Brush (2018–)
- Website: www.fuller.com

The Fuller Brush Company is an American company that sells branded and private label products for personal care, as well as for commercial and household cleaning. It was founded in 1906 by Alfred Fuller. Consolidated Foods (now Sara Lee Corporation) acquired Fuller Brush in 1968. In 1991, the company was placed in private ownership but in 1994, it became a subsidiary of CPAC Inc., which was owned by the private equity group Buckingham Capital Partners from 2007 to 2012. From December 2012 to December 2017, the company was owned and operated by David Sabin and Victory Park Capital. Since January 2018, it has been owned and operated by Galaxy Brush LLC, located in Lakewood, New Jersey.

== History ==
=== Early years ===
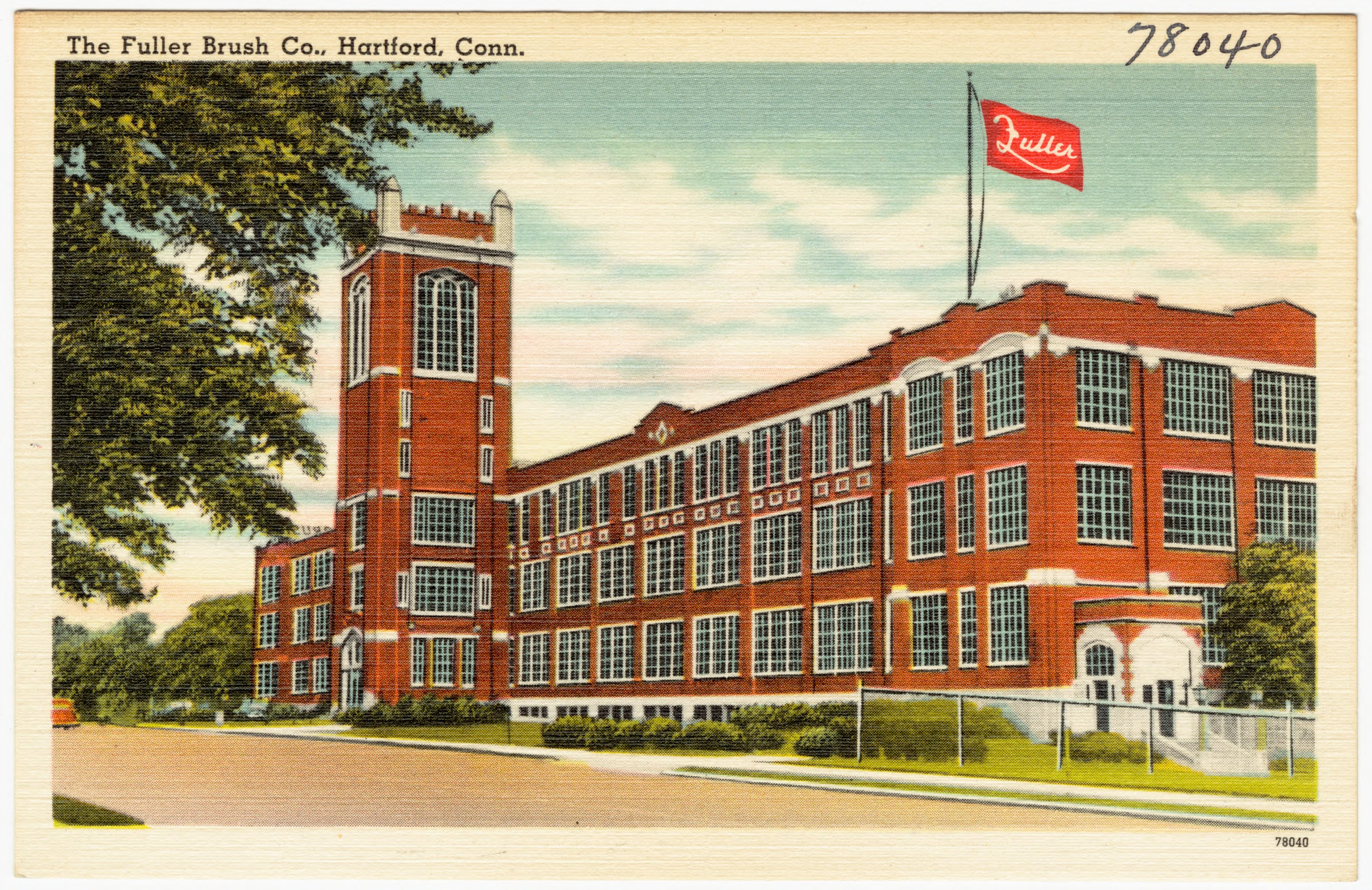
Fuller Brush Company headquarters, c. 1930 to 1945

Alfred Carl Fuller began what was to become the Fuller Brush Company in a basement shop in Somerville, Massachusetts. In 1906, he moved to Hartford, Connecticut and founded the company.

The company began with door-to-door sales of brushes of various sorts, including hairbrushes with a lifetime guarantee for which they are famous.

In 1931, the establishment of the first of what became known as the Green River ordinance led Fuller Brush to challenge the ordinance's limits on door-to-door sales; the case went all the way to the U.S. Supreme Court, where on March 1, 1937, it dismissed the appeal "for want of a substantial federal question."

In the mid-1930s, Fuller relocated from rented space on Union Place across from the New Haven RR station to a purpose-built sprawling three-story brick factory and office complex on the north edge of Hartford at 3580 Main St. World War II saw the company "cut its normal civilian output drastically to make brushes for the cleaning of guns". Fuller's son, Howard Fuller, became president of the company in 1943.

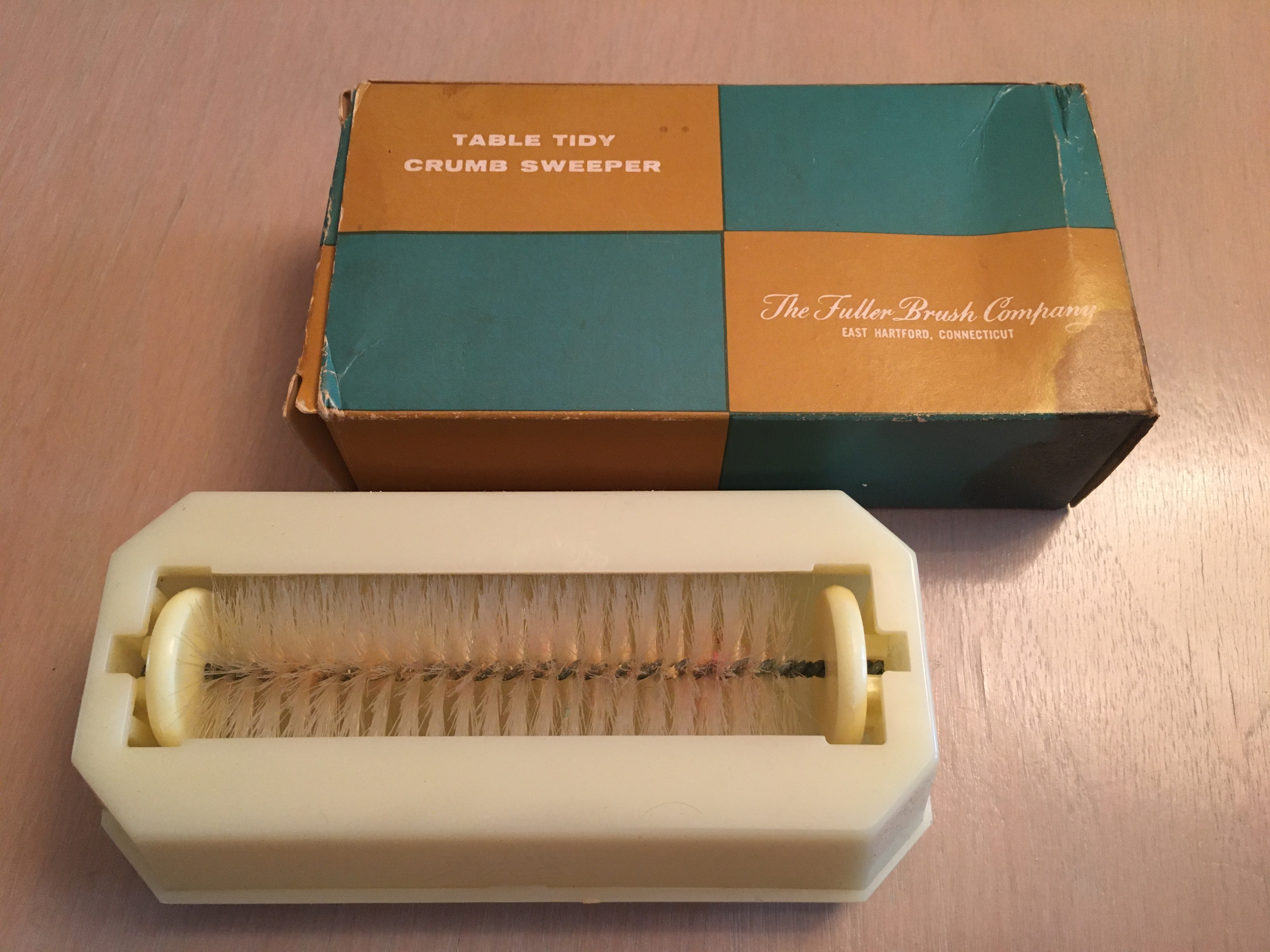
Table Tidy Crumb Sweeper, c. 1950s–1960s

After the war, Fuller added Daggett & Ramsdell, Inc.'s Débutante Cosmetics to its line of products, sold by a sales force of women, a strategy resurrected after a wartime attempt to have "Fullerettes" sell their core products. Fuller had evidence that women could succeed at sales since Stanley Beveridge—who had left his position as Fuller's sales vice president in 1929—had (by 1949) employed women as "dealers" to grow sales at his own company, Stanley Home Products, to $35 million, exceeding Fuller's sales for the first time.

Fuller's eldest son, Howard, succeeded his father as president, serving until he and his wife Dora died in an auto crash in May 1959.

=== 1959 to 1994 ===
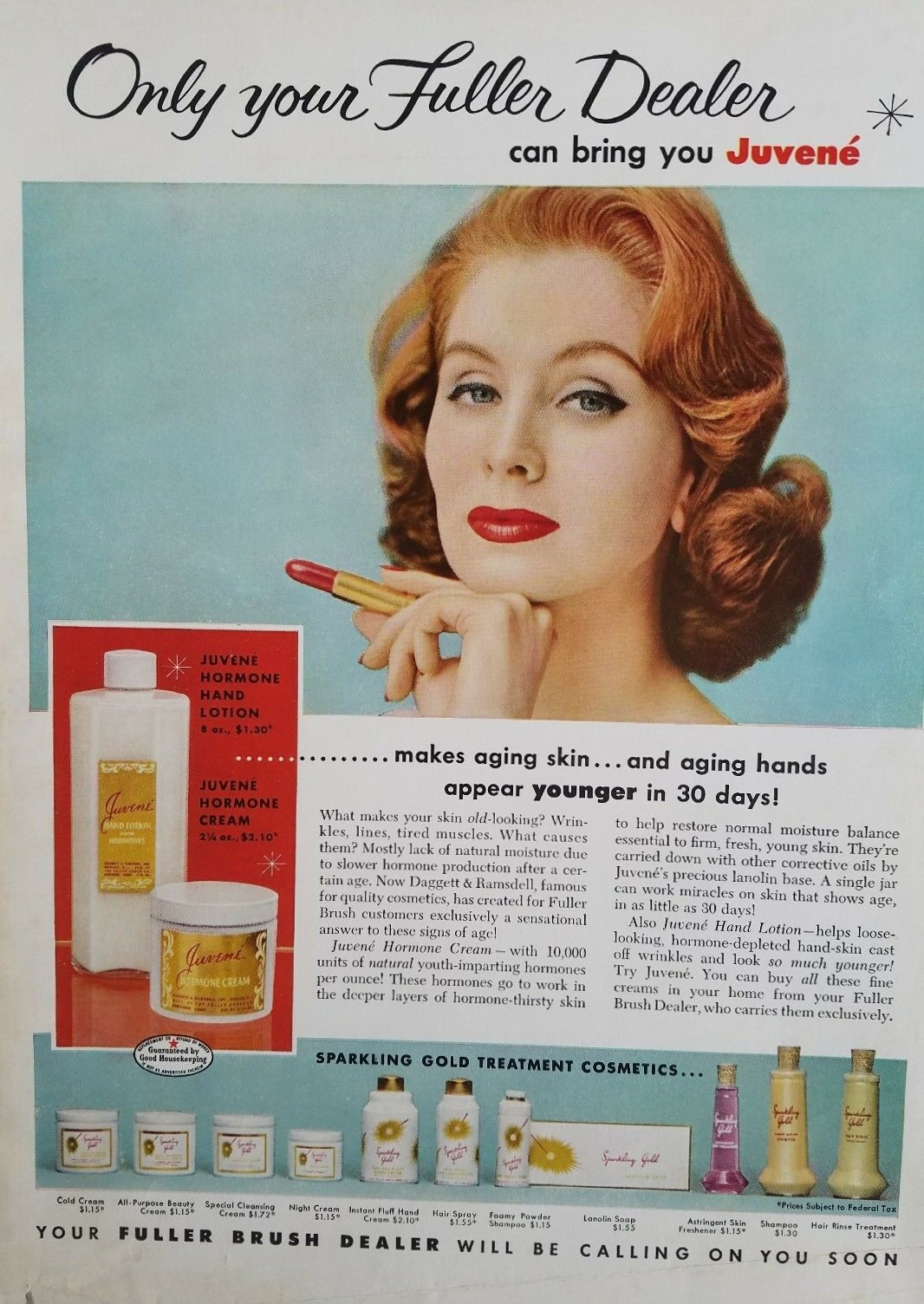
Advertisement, 1956

In 1959, Avard Ells Fuller (the founder's younger son, aged 44) became Fuller Brush's president. Having long outgrown the Hartford location, in 1960 the company moved to a new, purpose-built campus on Long Hill St., East Hartford, Conn. That year, Alfred C. Fuller published his autobiography A Foot In the Door; the title described a salesman's technique in prolonging a conversation to turn it into a sale.

In 1966, Fuller Brush hired 17,500 women, motivated by the lack of qualified men (the unemployment rate was 3.8%) and the example set by Avon Products.

Consolidated Foods, now Sara Lee Corporation, acquired Fuller Brush in 1968; Avard Fuller retired a year later. Office operations moved initially to Niles, Illinois, then relocated along with manufacturing and research to Great Bend, Kansas in 1973.

As of 1985, all of the company's sales were still generated door-to-door. By the mid-1980s, however, in recognition of the decrease in the number of women at home during the day, Fuller Brush began introducing other sales channels beyond door-to-door. This included a mail-order catalog that sent out 10 million catalogs a year, and several outlet stores selling "slow-selling items, returned merchandise or slightly flawed goods". By mid-1989, 35% of that year's estimated $160 million in sales came from catalogs, with another 5% coming from its stores. Later that same year, a group of investors from Kansas headed by Lee Turner, a trial lawyer, took Fuller private; by 1991, the company, now known as Fuller Industries and led by Stuart A. Ochiltree, decided that the future of the company was in multi-level marketing, which essentially destroyed the entire door-to-door sales force. Although it has been rumored that the company had integrated its door-to-door and catalog business, with its 12,000 mostly part-time sales representatives receiving commissions for sales from either channel, this is not accurate. There was a marketing plan promoting this idea brought forth by both Michael Bravakis and David Litt, appropriately named the Cross Channel Productivity Plan; however, it was rejected as not feasible under then-current CEO Steve Coggin. If that plan was to be undertaken, it would have been outright able to increased the revenue and profitability of the company, possibly saving it from the disastrous multilateral marketing decision and allowing it to transition to future online sales.

=== CPAC subsidiary ===
In June 1994, Fuller, once again known as Fuller Brush Company, was acquired by CPAC Inc., a Leicester, New York-based manufacturer of photographic chemicals; CPAC took on the "heavy debt burden" accumulated while the company was private and whose annual sales, increasingly focused on chemicals, had shrunk to $24 million.

=== 2007 ===
In 2007, CPAC Inc. was acquired by Buckingham Capital Partners in a leveraged buyout. On February 21, 2012, Fuller Brush Company filed for Chapter 11 bankruptcy; it had 180 employees at that time. In December, 2012, Victory Park Capital and CEO, David Sabin, bought the company out of its Chapter 11 bankruptcy. The headquarters were moved from Great Bend, Kansas, to Napa, California.

=== 2018 to present ===
In January 2018, Galaxy Brush of Lakewood, New Jersey purchased the name of Fuller Brush, including all trademarks and patents. Galaxy Brush, now doing business as Fuller Brush, also acquired the name brand and trademarks of Stanley Home Products. Galaxy Brush has since returned Fuller Brush and Stanley Home Products manufacturing back to their respective roots in Great Bend, Kansas, where many of the original products were made.

== Locations ==
=== Connecticut ===
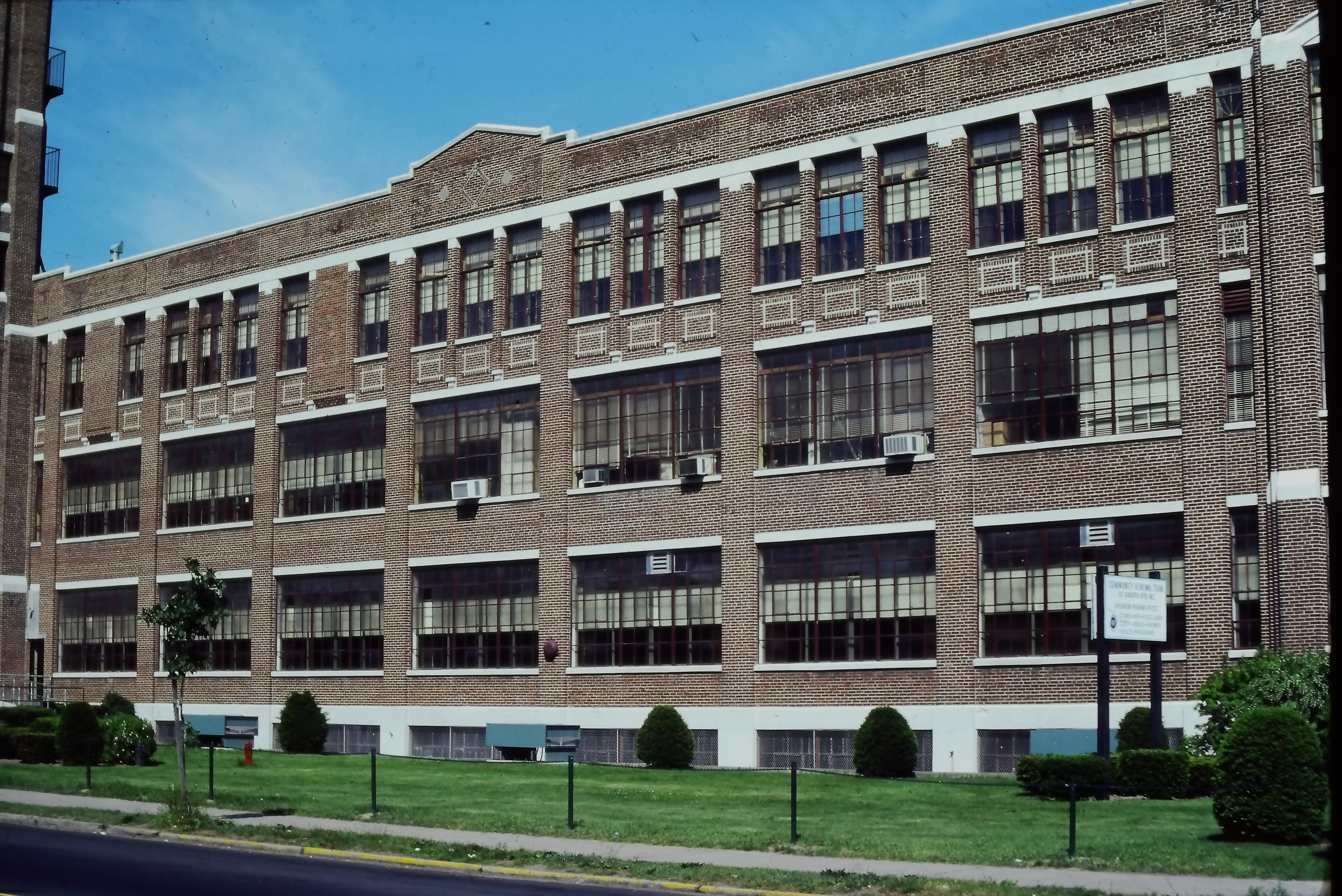
Hartford office, 1981

The main factory for the Fuller Brush Company was located in East Hartford, Connecticut, during the 1960s, where Fuller's son Avard ran the company. It had moved from Hartford on the other side of the Connecticut River some years earlier. In front of the East Hartford plant was a large glass case with a large marble boar to represent the boar hair used in some of the original Fuller brushes.

The Research Division was there, led by Hank Whitman, along with the plastics molding operation. Fuller had a "private label" division, Charter Products, that sold duplicate products under other brand names chosen by the distributor.

The Industrial Division, under Verne Joy, was also at the East Hartford plant, where they made large motor-driven brushes for developing newspaper printing photo metal plates. All the mops were sewn at this plant. The perfuming operation was there also, including a large machine to detect what was in perfume made by other companies.

Avard's interest in boating resulted in experiments at the plant with plastic molding of port lights (windows) for boats, including full plastic hardware.

=== New York ===
The plastic bottle and toothbrush manufacturing operation was in Philmont, New York. According to Fuller's memoir, Fuller Brush distributed the Bristlecomb, a hairbrush introduced by the Mohawk Company in 1928. In 1942, Fuller Brush bought out the Mohawk Brush Company and subsequently all the hairbrushes and industrial floor brushes were manufactured at the Mohawk Plant in Albany, New York.

=== Great Bend, Kansas ===
Since 1972, Fuller brushes and over 2,000 other Fuller products have been manufactured in Barton County, near Great Bend, Kansas.

=== Napa, California ===
Headquarters were moved from Kansas to California shortly after being purchased by David Sabin and Victory Park Capital, while the manufacturing remains in Great Bend, Kansas.

== Former employees ==
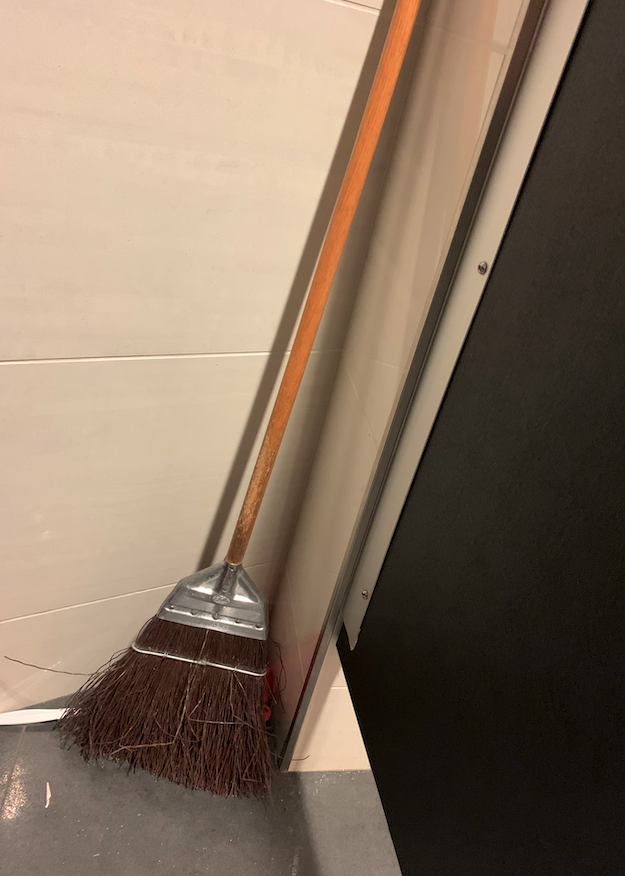
Fuller Brush broom

Former employees include evangelist Billy Graham, who became a Fuller Brush salesman during the summer after high school, and outsold "every other salesman in North Carolina". In his 1997 autobiography, Just As I Am, Graham describes in some detail his experiences selling Fuller brushes door-to-door. Ellen Barkin was "born in the Bronx to a father who worked as a Fuller Brush man". Clifford Irving "was a Fuller Brush man in Syracuse." Dewald Strauss was a Holocaust survivor and Fuller Brush salesman in New York City, who was famously painted by Alice Neel in her painting entitled Fuller Brush Man.

Groundlings Theater veteran Paul Reubens (of Pee-wee Herman fame) worked as a Fuller Brush salesman while attending the California Institute of the Arts.

Other former employees include Frank Gross, photographer Tom Leutwiler, Dennis Quaid, Dick Clark, J. Bruce Llewellyn (co-founder of 100 Black Men of America), Ed Mirvish, Jack Sensenbrenner, Kin Shriner, and Ed Stelmach. Jack Nicholson and Felicia Farr were also featured in a few pictures in The Fuller Magazine. Broadcaster Lowell Green admitted during his April 24, 2014, program to selling Fuller Brushes in Montreal's Westmount area during his college days in the 1950s.
