= Door-to-door =

Sales and canvassing technique

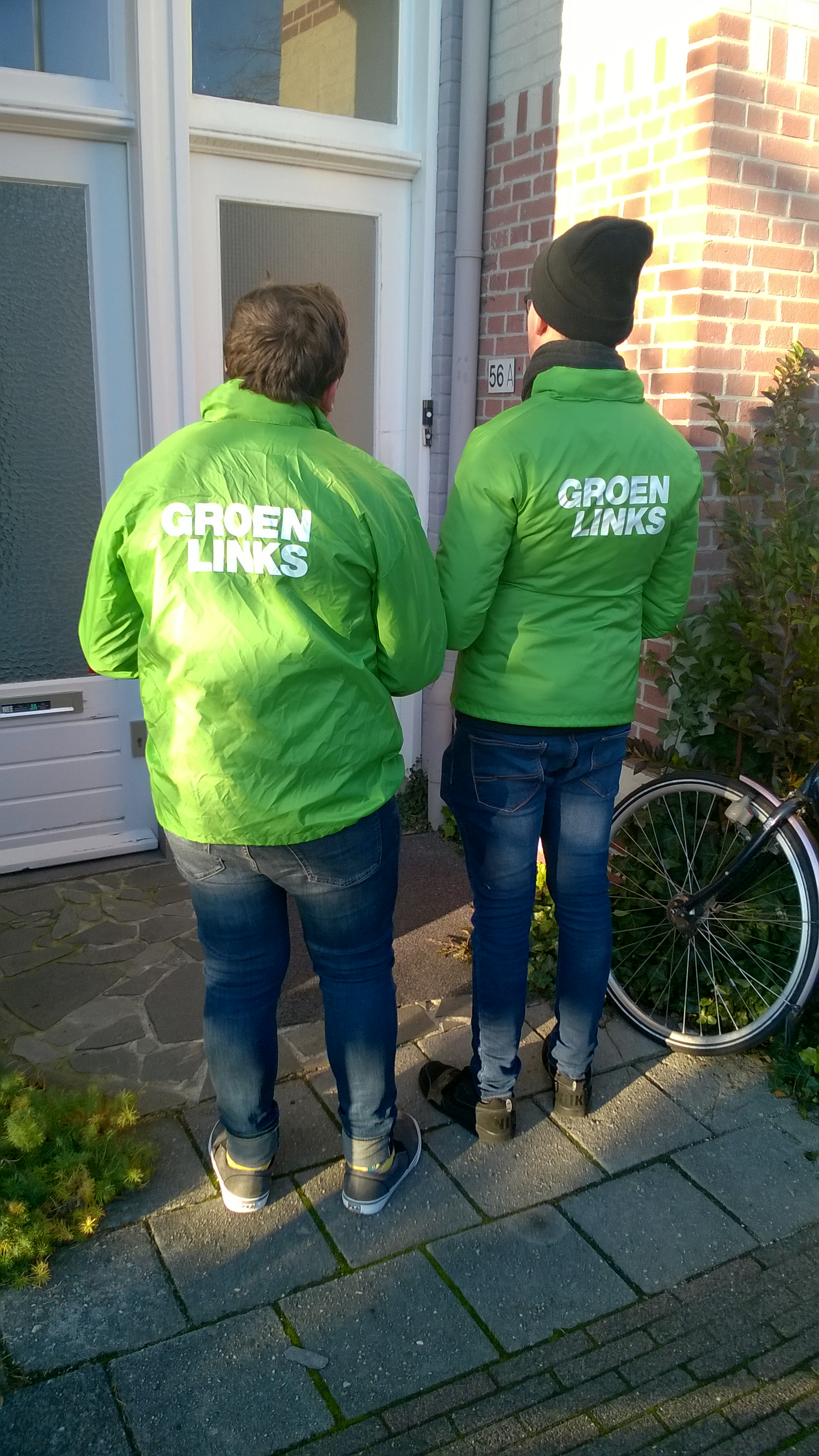
Members of the Dutch political party GroenLinks canvassing door-to-door in Groningen

Door-to-door is a canvassing technique that is generally used for sales, marketing, advertising, evangelism or campaigning, in which the person or persons walk from the door of one house to the door of another, trying to sell or advertise a product or service to the general public or gather information. People who use this sales approach are often known as traveling salesmen, or by the archaic name drummer (someone who "drums up" business), and the technique is also sometimes called direct sales. A variant of this involves cold calling first, when another sales representative attempts to gain agreement that a salesperson should visit.

Historically, this was a major method of distributing goods outside large towns, with the salesmen, often self-employed, known as pedlars, peddlers, or hawkers. With the huge growth of retail shops in the 19th century, it became less important, and the development of mail order and finally sales via the internet gradually reduced its significance in advanced economies except in a few fields, such as repairs and renovations.

== Model ==
Products or services sold door-to-door are generally in one of seven industries: cable, telecommunications, solar, energy, security, landscaping and construction. There are also many multi-level marketing products sold door-to-door. The industries accounting for the largest share of direct-sales revenue include construction and telecommunications. The largest subset of these would be home improvement products/services, where items sold could include new or repaired roofs, siding, new replacement windows, and decorative stone. As of 2008 the business model of many companies that participate in this type of direct marketing has changed with the growth of the Information Age. Products sold door-to-door are now more likely to be more subtle in nature: such as sheets of coupons to events or local businesses, season tickets to local professional sports teams (both of these are known in the industry as "Cert [or certificate] Sales"), or subscriptions to home television services or broadband internet services. Telecommunications companies like Verizon Communications (Fios), Comcast (cable television and internet) and AT&T (U-verse TV) all contract with various marketing companies for nationwide sales fulfillment at the residential level. While the practice of the salesman carrying a bag of goods on his shoulder to sell to the public declined with advances made in technology and internet selling, there has been a resurgence of door-to-door selling in recent years, especially in the energy and solar industries, such as SolarCity and Vivint Solar.

== Banning and regulation ==
In the United States, some communities attempted to criminalize this form of selling by passing what is known as a Green River ordinance, first adopted in Green River, Wyoming, in 1931, which bans door-to-door solicitation without the occupant's prior consent. In 1933, the United States Court of Appeals for the Tenth Circuit upheld such a law valid but in 1976 the Supreme Court extended the First Amendment to commercial speech and in 1980 set forth a four-pronged test regarding the regulation of door-to-door selling:

1. The pitch itself must not regard things that are in themselves illegal and must be truthful to be protected by the First Amendment.
2. Assertive governmental interest is substantial.
3. The regulation directly advances point 2.
4. If the regulation is necessary to serve that interest (i.e. demonstrating “no solicitation” signs and already existing trespass laws are not sufficient).

If a regulation meets these criteria, it is most likely legal.

== Revival ==
In 2011, door-to-door sales was named one of the top 10 dead or dying career paths with an 18 percent decline in positions expected by 2018. Instead, between 2012 and 2013, door-to-door sales positions started growing 34% year-over-year. In 2017 the market is believed to be worth $36 billion, an increase of $7.7 billion since 2009 (or $4 billion if adjusted for inflation). As of 2017, the research shows that 20.5 million people in the United States have signed agreements with direct selling companies making them eligible to purchase discounted products and resell them that at a profit, and to sponsor others individuals who also can sell the products.

New technologies have also changed door-to-door sales' efficacy and appeal for organizations. Expansive databases of American households pull together demographic information, consumer data, and past-canvassing profiles to allow precise targeting of potential buyers. Corporations no longer knock on all the doors in an area, instead they focus on people most likely to buy their products or services.

== Law enforcement and detective work ==
Police detectives many times will go door-to-door at residences that exist nearby a crime scene, to see if the victim or suspect may have known (or may have been known by) any of the residents in the general vicinity, or to gather information from potential witnesses.

== Religious work ==
The Bible records that Jesus sent out his disciples to evangelize by visiting peoples homes in pairs of two believers (cf. Luke 10:1–12).

Accordingly, in Christianity, Methodist churches aligned with the holiness movement engage in door-to-door evangelism; in this tradition, it is frequently referred to as "calling". Baptist congregations are known for door-to-door evangelism as well. In both the Holiness Methodist and Baptist Christian traditions, those visiting people's homes commonly distribute gospel tracts to residents.

Restorationist groups, such as Jehovah's Witnesses, Seventh-Day Adventists and the Church of Jesus Christ of Latter-day Saints, are known for door-to-door evangelizing and proselytizing.

== See also ==
- Canvassing
- Solicitation
