= Joey Gibson (model) =

American model (born 1945)

Playboy centerfold appearance
- June 1967
- Preceded by: Anne Randall
- Succeeded by: Heather Ryan

Personal details
- Born: Nancy Virginia Cole; August 11, 1945 (age 79); Santa Monica, California, U.S.
- Height: 5 ft 6 in (168 cm)

Joey Gibson (born Nancy Virginia Cole on August 11, 1945) is an American model who was Playboy magazine's Playmate of the Month for its June 1967 issue. Her centerfold (shot on a beach while building a sandcastle in the nude) was photographed by Peter Gowland.

In the aftermath of Gibson's centerfold appearance it was revealed that she had been convicted on prostitution charges in Santa Monica, California. Esquire magazine presented her with one of its Dubious Achievement Awards. The accompanying caption read "for Joey Gibson 1967 was a year of both promise and travail."

== See also ==
- List of people in Playboy 1960–1969

Surrey Marshe	Kim Farber	Fran Gerard	Gwen Wong	Anne Randall	Joey Gibson
Heather Ryan	DeDe Lind	Angela Dorian	Reagan Wilson	Kaya Christian	Lynn Winchell
