= Treanor =

Treanor may refer to:

- Conor James Treanor (born 1998), English Actor
- Frank P. Treanor (1855–1933), New York politician
- Marc Treanor (1963–2020), British sand artist
- Mark Treanor (born 1963), Scottish footballer
- Matt Treanor (born 1976), American baseball player
- Michael Treanor (born 1979), actor and martial arts fighter
- Misty May-Treanor (born 1977), American professional beach volleyball player
- Noel Treanor (born 1950), Catholic Bishop of Down and Connor
- William Treanor (born 1957), American legal scholar

== See also ==
- Mayna Treanor Avent Studio, historic mountain cabin
