= List of tourist attractions in Mysore =

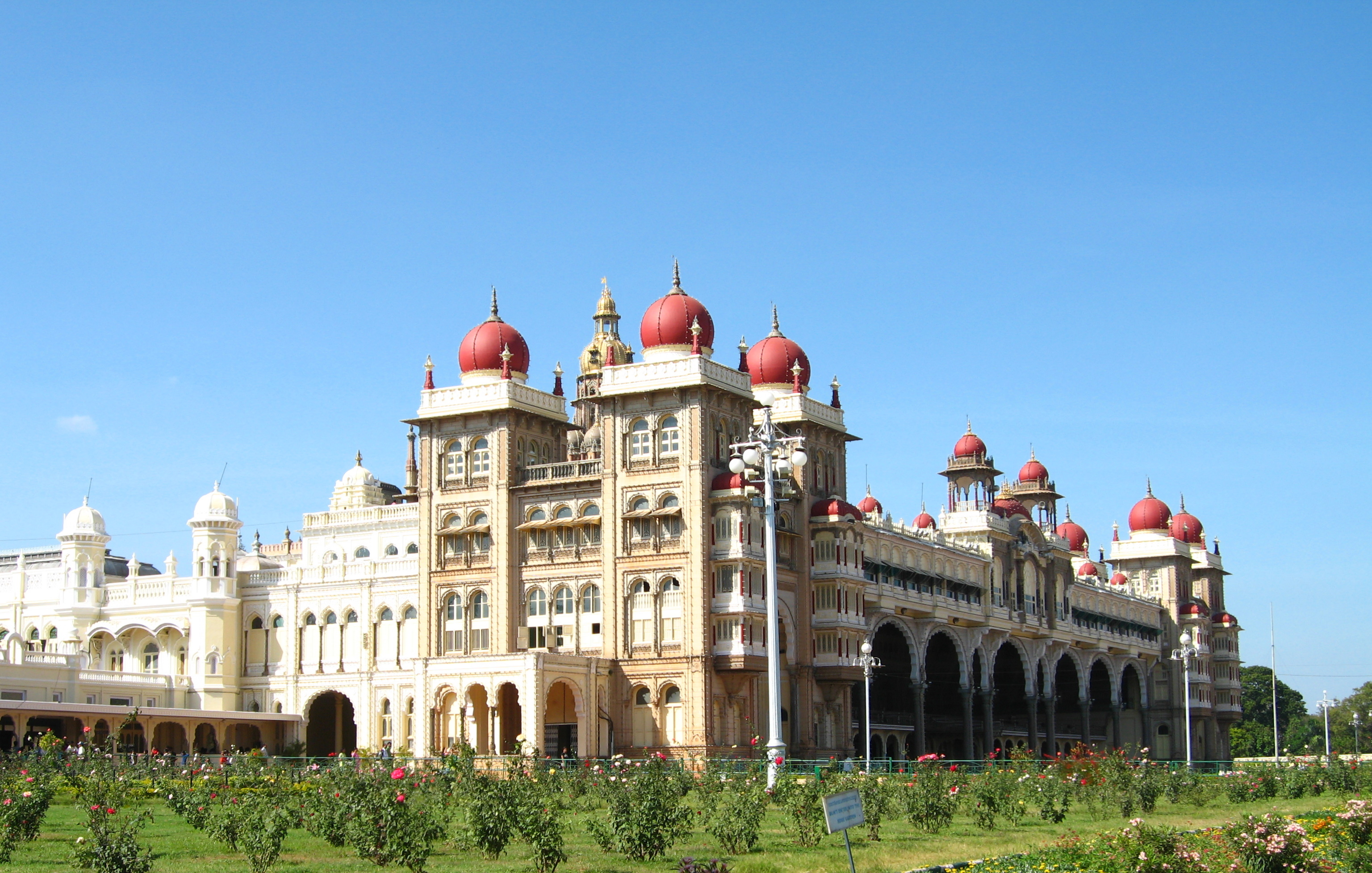
Mysore Palace

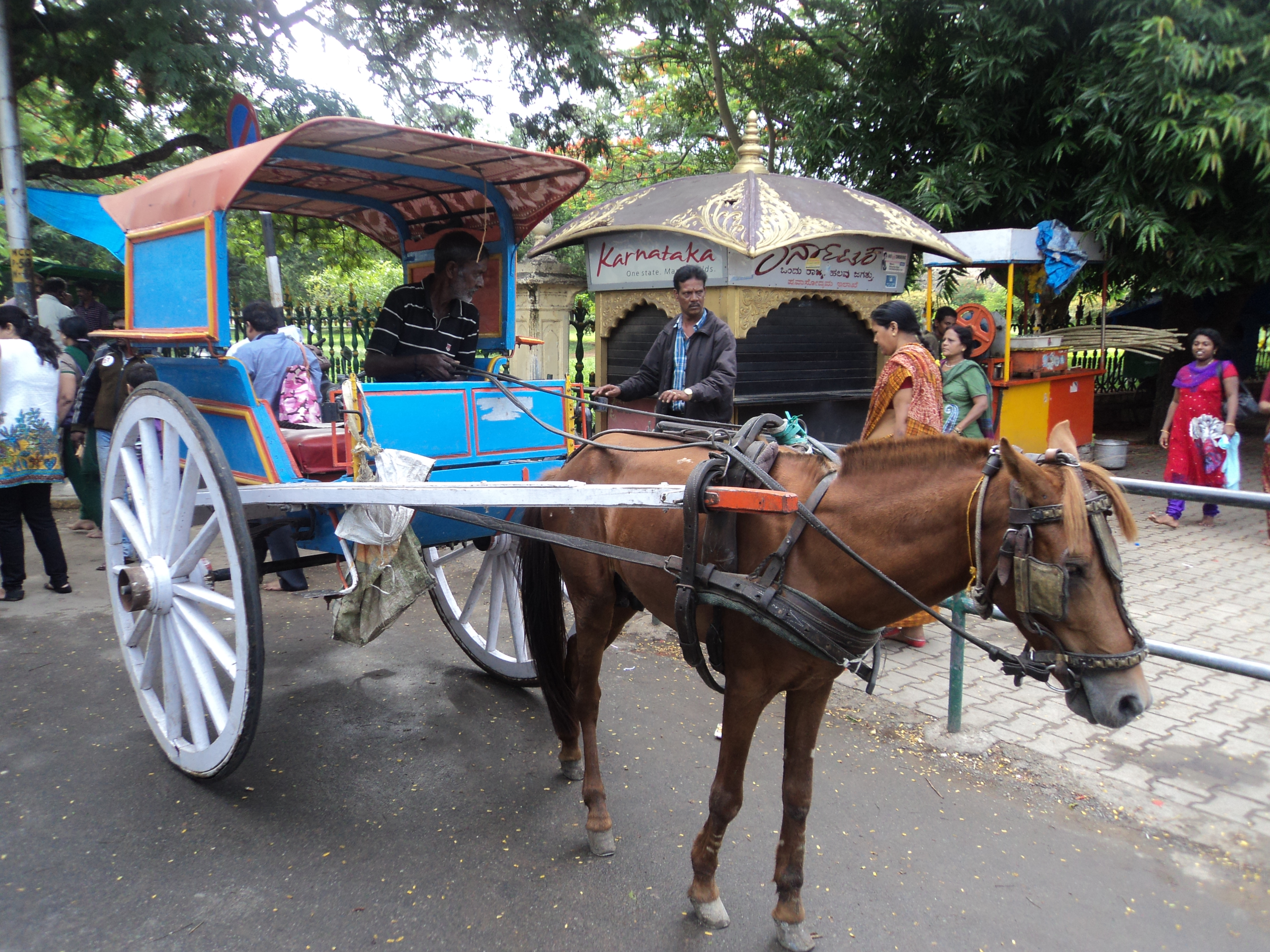
Horse carriage in Mysore

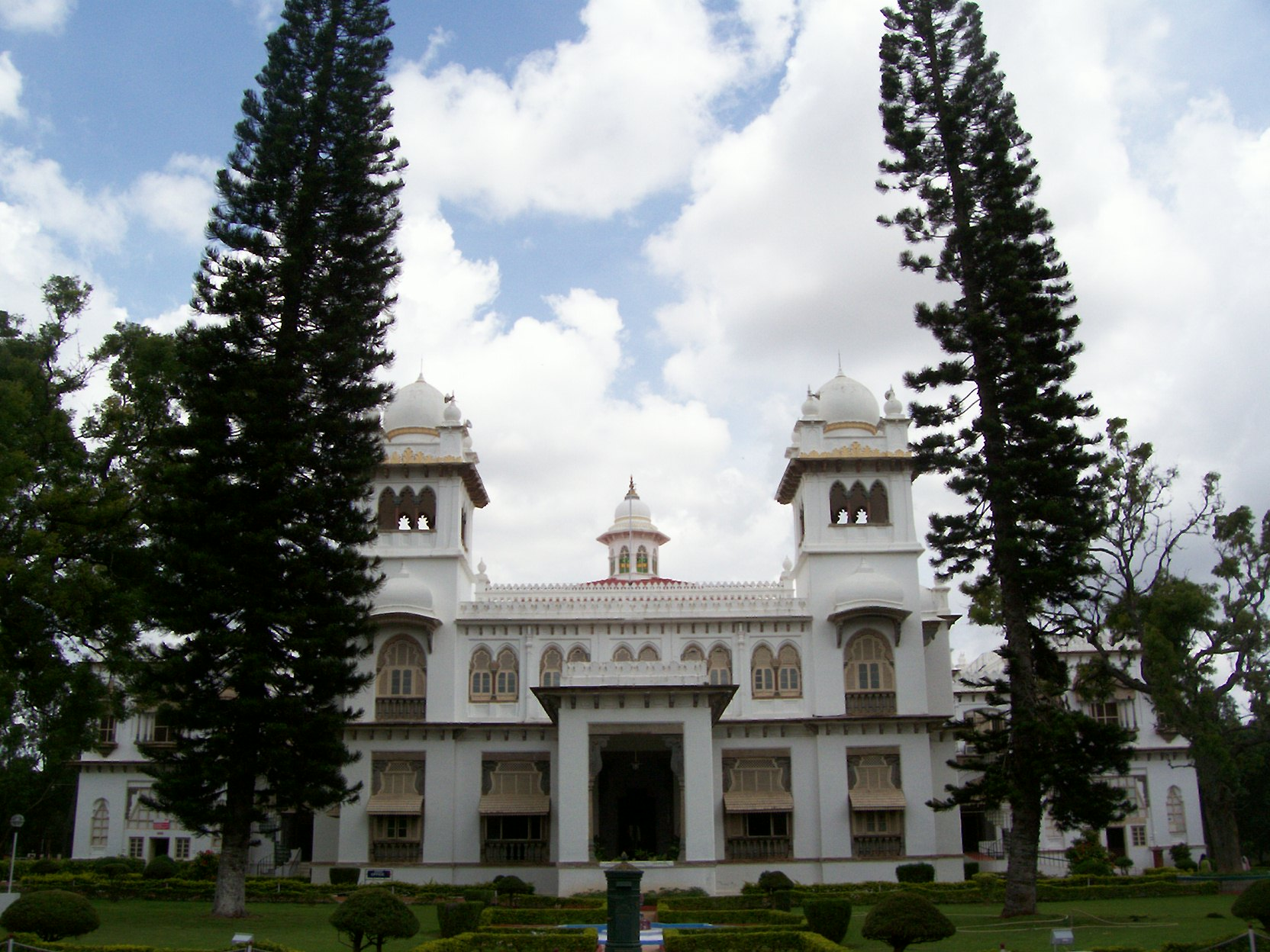
Karanji Mansion or PTC, Nazrabad

Mysore was the previous capital city in the state of Karnataka, India. It is the headquarters of the Mysore district and Mysore division and lies about 140 km (87 mi) southwest of Bengaluru, the capital of Karnataka. The city covers an area of 128.42 km^{2} (50 sq mi) and is situated at the base of the Chamundi Hills. Mysore is one of the most prominent tourist areas of India, known as the Palace City of India. The Mysore Palace in the city is the most visited place in India, above Red Fort, Qutb Minar, and even the Taj Mahal as of 2006. The New York Times recently listed Mysore as one of the 31 must-see places on Earth for two consecutive years.

== Attractions ==
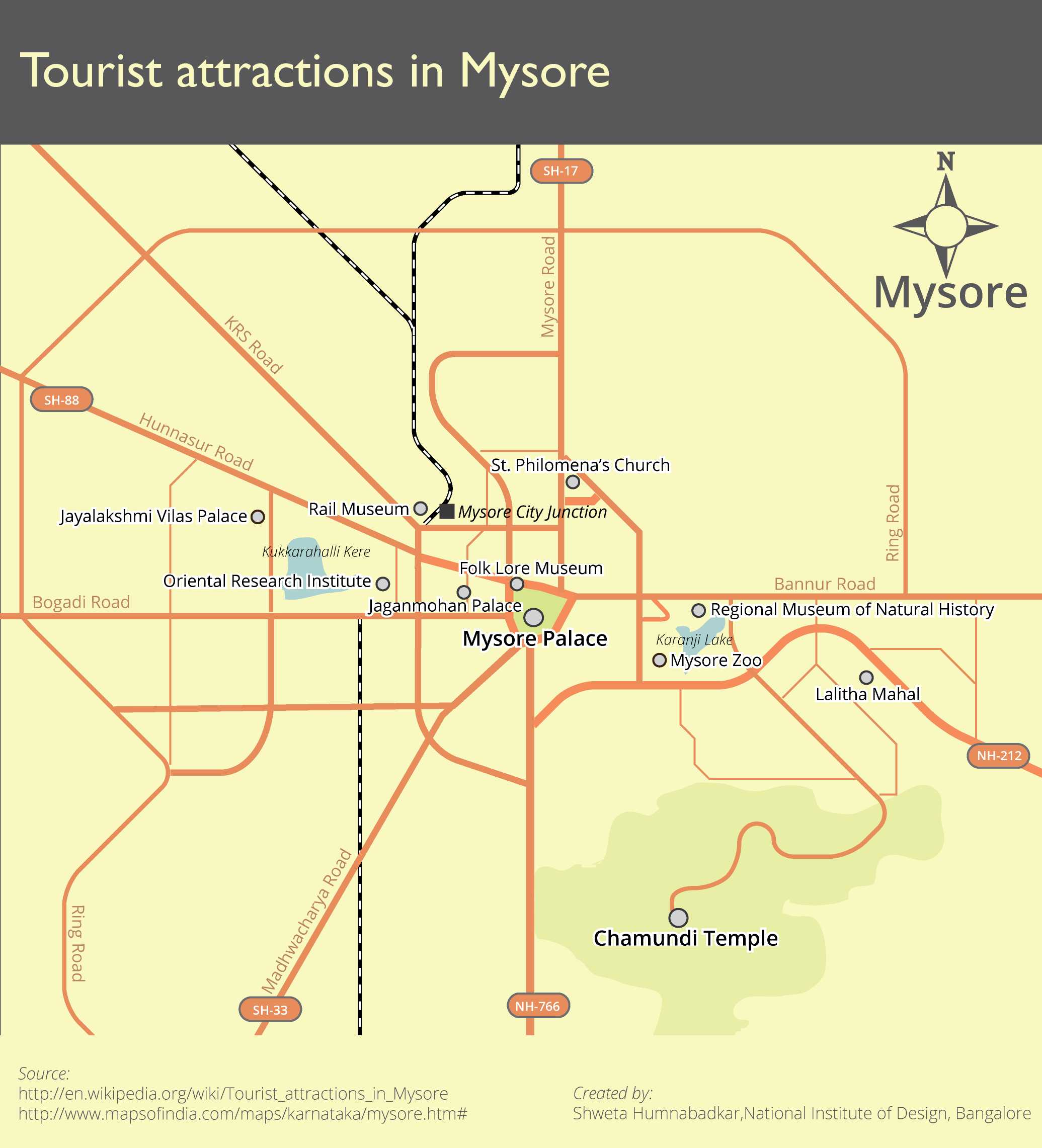
Schematic tourist map of Mysore

=== Palaces ===
- Mysore Palace is a palace situated in the centre of the city. It was the official residence of the former royal family of Mysore and also housed the durbar (royal offices).
- Lalitha Mahal is the second largest palace in Mysore. It is located near the Chamundi Hills, east of the city. The architect of this palace was E. W. Fritchley. The palace was built by Krishnaraja Wodeyar IV in 1921 for the exclusive stay of the Viceroy of India. The palace is pure white in color and is built in the style of Italian palazzos with twin ionic columns and domes. It also has a sprawling terrace and landscaped gardens.
- Jaganmohan Palace was built in 1861 by Krishnaraja Wodeyar III in a predominantly Hindu style to serve as an alternate palace for the royal family. This palace housed the royal family when the older Mysore Palace burned down due to a fire. The palace has three floors and has stained glass shutters and ventilators. It has housed the Sri Jayachamarajendra Art Gallery since the year 1915. The collections exhibited here include paintings from the famous Indian painter, Raja Ravi Varma, the Russian painter Svetoslav Roerich, and many paintings of the Mysore painting style.

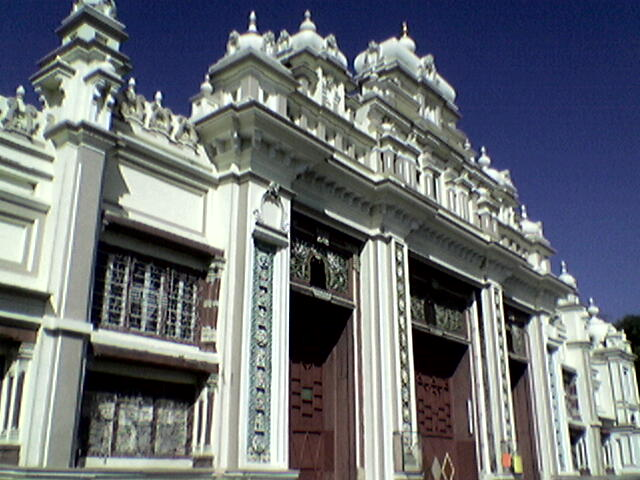
Jaganmohana Palace, Mysore

- Jayalakshmi Vilas Mansion was built in 1905 by Chamaraja Wodeyar for his eldest daughter, Jayalakshmi Devi. This mansion has three wings and contains a series of twin Corinthian and ionic columns, regal pediments, and oval ventilators. The mansion was originally built with a cost of Rs. 7 lakhs. This mansion was acquired by the Mysore University to house its post-graduate campus. It was then renovated in 2002 from funding provided by Infosys Foundation. The main hall in this mansion is the Kalyana Mantapa, which has an eight-petal shaped dome with stained glass windows with a gold-plated Kalasha (tower) at the top. A new gallery called Writer's Gallery has been created in the Kalyana Mantapa hall that will exhibit the personal items, photographs, awards and writings of renowned writers of Kannada. A special illumination system has also been added to this heritage structure. This mansion is said to be the first university museum complex in the country.

=== Gardens ===
- The Brindavan Gardens, Srirangapatna, Mandya district are show gardens that have a beautiful botanical park, full of fountains, as well as boats in the river beneath the dam. Diwans of Mysore planned and built the gardens in connection with the construction of the dam. Display items include a musical fountain. Various biological research departments are housed here. There is a guest house for tourists as well. It is situated at Krishna Raja Sagara (KRS) dam Mandya district.

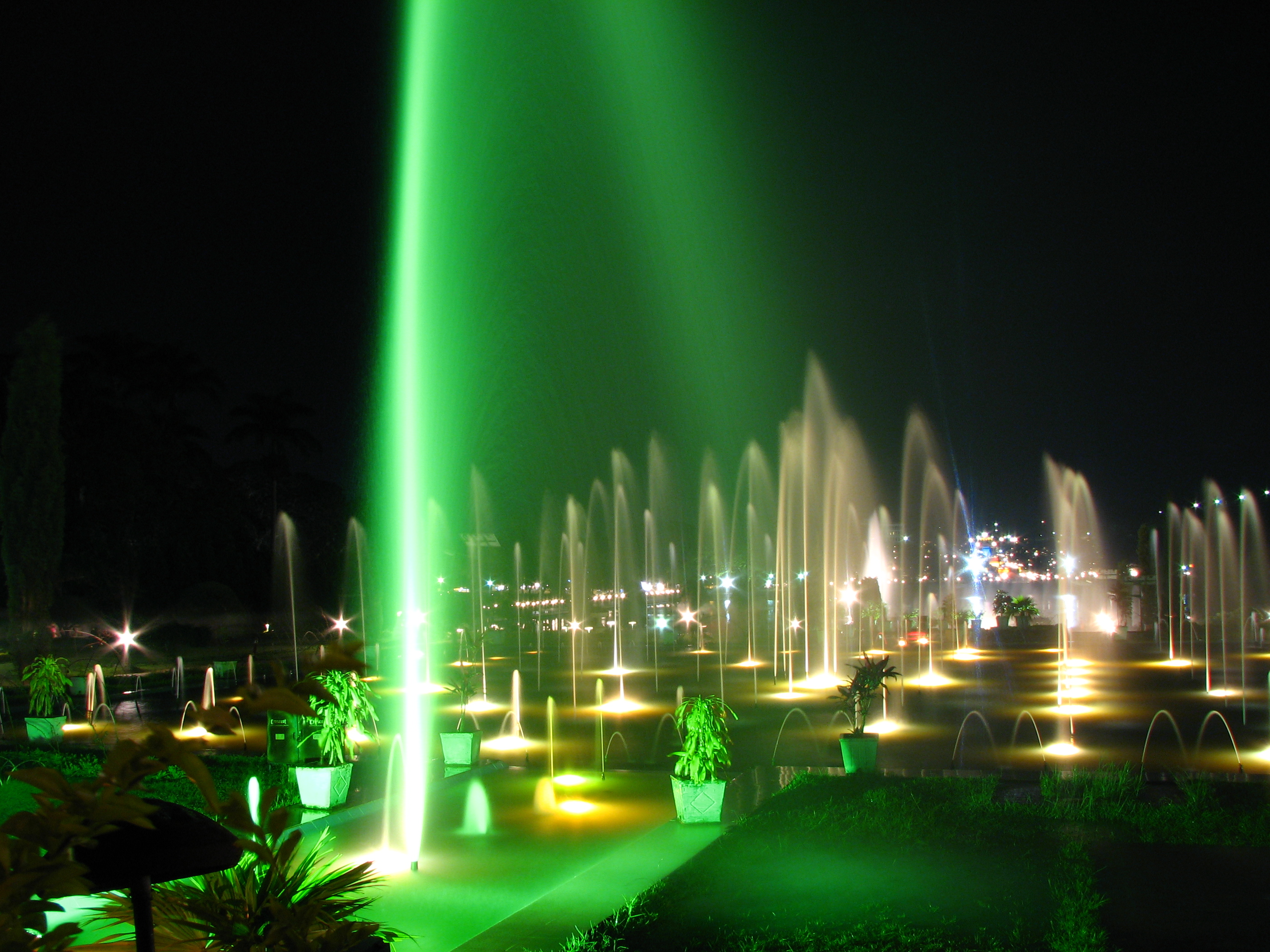
Brindavan Garden Fountains at night

- JALBAGH in Belagola, located 10 km from Mysore on KRS main road. is one of the world's first reflection gardens. It contains artistic sculptures and a park with natural water bodies and water landscapes, large historical monuments, and information about all the habitats consisting in and around the surroundings. It sometimeshosts art and light shows. Lo
- Happy Man Park The Happy Man Park near Kamakshi Hospital, some three kilometers from the railway station, is popular among children and parents. The park is quite compact in size but contains a mini zoo and many hens and ducks roam around the lawns freely. The park is landscaped with a stream and wooden bridges. Music is played through loudspeakers scattered around the park. The main attraction of the park is a statue of a ‘Happy Man’ with a pot belly representing the "Laughing Buddha" or "Budai", a Maitreya (future Buddha) .
- Butterfly park in Karanji lake This consists of a medium-sized bird park, boating, and a children's play area.
- Parks, gardens, and children play areas. Mysore has about 180 parks and playgrounds. Most of the residential areas have their own small parks: e.g. Ambedkar Park in Jayanagar, a southern city district has a 500-metre perimeter footpath, etc. The newly built Andolana Circle Park has a walking track that takes around five minutes a go around. This park is near Kuvempu Nagar in South Mysore. But many Mysoreans go to walk around the many lakes which pepper the landscape such as the central Kukkarahalli Kere by the university where the journey around is about 4.5 kilometres. Another is the Lingambudhi Kere which has a walkway with bamboo forests and on average takes more than 20 minutes for a go around. This park is in a desirable neighbourhood to the southwest called Rama Krishna Nagar, 5 km from the city centre.

=== Museums ===
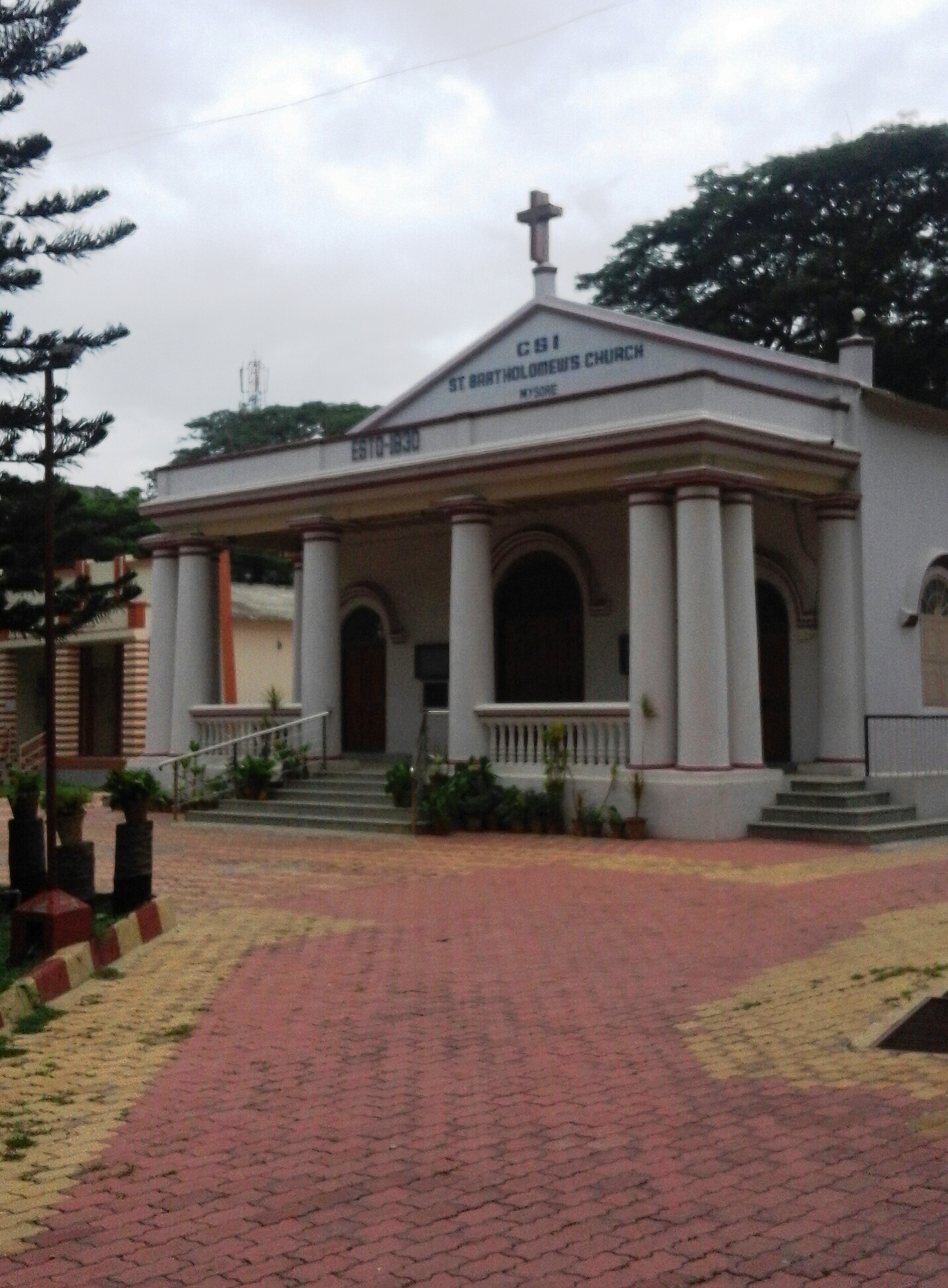
St.Bartholomew Church, Mysore

- Mysore Sand Sculpture Museum: With 115 truckloads of sand and with more than 150 huge sculptures, this museum showcases more than 16 themes of the Heritage of Mysore.
- Regional Museum of Natural History: This museum is located on the banks of the Karanji lake in Mysore and has exhibits related to biological diversity, ecology, and geology of Southern India.
- Folk Lore Museum: This museum is located on the University of Mysore campus and exhibits over 6500 folk art and crafts from all over the state of Karnataka.
- Rail Museum: This museum is located near the Mysore Railway station and is the second of its kind established in India after the one at Delhi. This museum exhibits ancient locomotives and carriages, some of which are still in working condition. Photographs and books related to railways are also present.

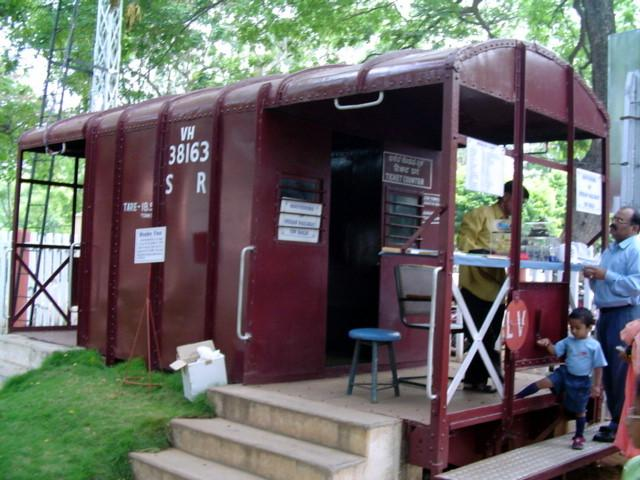
Rail Museum at Mysore

- Wax Museum - Melody World : This museum is based on music and musical instruments and exhibits over 100 life-size wax statues and over 1500 musical instruments categorised in various bands and stage settings. Representing Stone Age to Modern instruments, some of the genres displayed are Indian classical (north and south), Punjabi bhangra, south Indian, jazz, rock, and Middle Eastern music. It was established in October 2010.

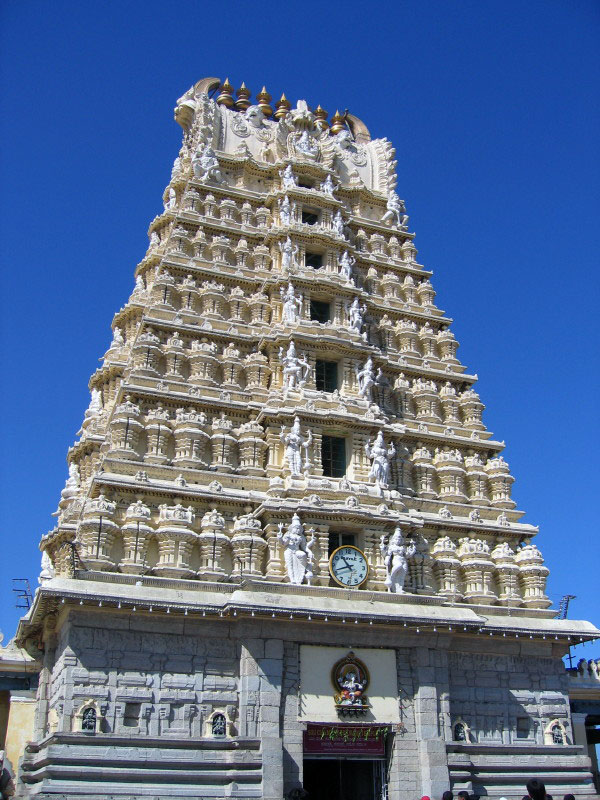
Chamundi temple

=== Places of worship ===
- Chamundi Hills is close to the palace city of Mysore. Its average elevation is 1,000 meters. A panoramic view of the city is seen from the top of the hills, including views of the Lalitha Mahal palace, Mysore Palace, Karanji and Kukkarahalli lakes. On Sunday evenings and during the Dasara festival, the illuminated Mysore Palace glitters.

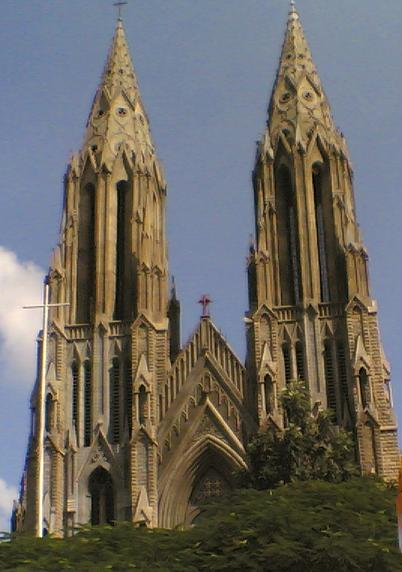
The St. Philomena's Church in Mysore

- St. Philomena's Church is a church built in honor of St. Philomena in the city of Mysore. It was constructed in 1956 using a Neo Gothic style and its architecture was inspired by the Cologne Cathedral in Germany. In 1926, Sir T. Thumboo Chetty who was the Huzur Secretary to the Maharaja of Mysore, Nalvadi Krishnaraja Wodeyar, obtained a relic of the saint Philomena, after writing to Peter Pisani, Apostolic Delegate of the East Indies. This relic was handed over to Father Cochet who approached the king to assist him in constructing a church in honor of St. Philomena. The Maharaja of Mysore laid the foundation stone of the church on 28 October 1933. In his speech on the day of the inauguration, the Maharaja is said to have quoted, "The new church will be strongly and securely built upon a double foundation — Divine compassion and the eager gratitude of men..." The construction of the church was completed under Bishop Rene Fuga's supervision. The relic of St. Philomena is preserved in a catacomb below the main altar.
- St. Bartholomew's Church, was built on the land donated by the Maharaja of Mysore, Krishnaraja Wodeyar III (1799–1868), and consecrated in 1830. The church was constructed in 1832 with contributions from military officers and civilians. In 1847, the church was affiliated to the Anglican denomination and was handed over to the Madras Government in 1852.
- Infant Jesus Shrine is located at Pushpashrama in Naidu Nagar some five kilometres from Mysore palace. The gateway of the church stands 30 feet high. There is a grotto on the right side containing a life-sized statue of Jesus as an infant. The church is built in an octagonal diamond shape with granite stone. There are three large teakwood doors to enter the church. There are carvings of St. Teresa and St. John on the right side door. The left side entrance has carvings of St. Therese and St. Edith Sterin. The altar has a globe and a tree. The church has fourteen stained windows decorated with pictures. There is a small chapel on the back of the church on the mezzanine floor.
- Nanjangud The shiva temple at Nanjungudu is also called "Dakshina kashi." It is about 20 km away from the Mysore palace .

=== Wildlife ===
- Mysore Zoo was established under royal patronage in 1892, making it one of the oldest zoos in the world.. Located on the outskirts of Mysore, the zoo is home to a wide range of wild species. The official name for the zoo is Shri Chamarajendra Zoological Gardens, although it is known most commonly by its shortened name.

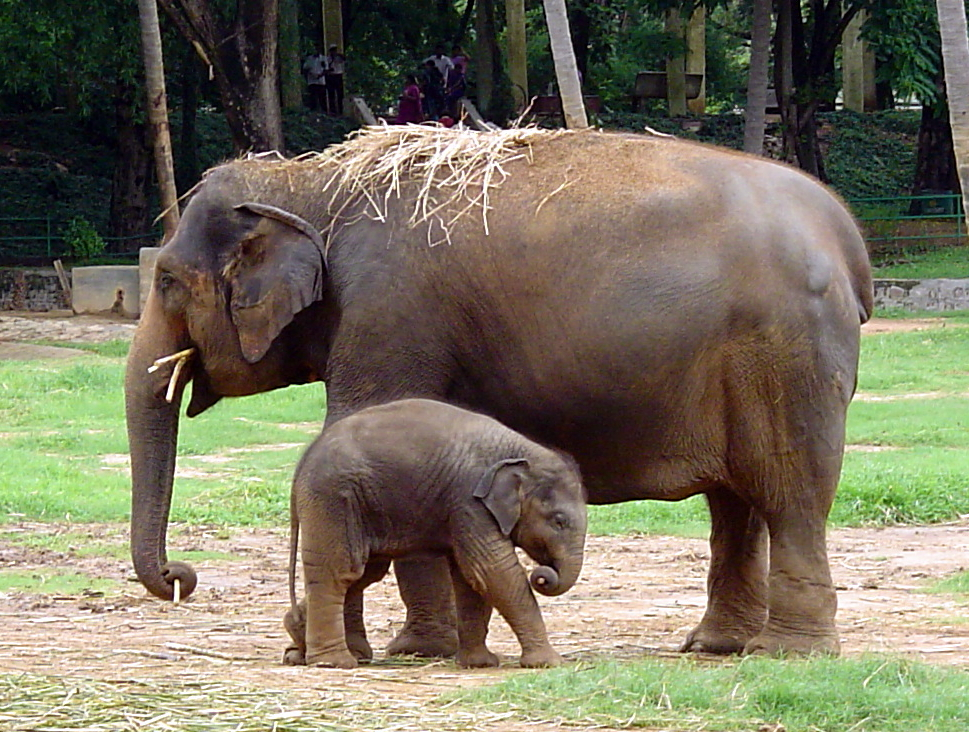
Elephant and calf in the Mysore Zoo

- Ranganathittu Bird Sanctuary, Mandya district is a small bird sanctuary that is 0.67 km^{2} in area and comprises six islets on the banks of the Kaveri River. The islets were created when a dam across the Kaveri river was built in the 18th century. The ornithologist Dr. Salim Ali observed that the isles formed an important nesting ground for birds, and persuaded the Wodeyar kings of Mysore to declare the area a wildlife sanctuary in 1940. The islands are host to numerous small mammals, including bonnet macaque, colonies of flying foxes, and common small mammals like the common palm civet, the Indian gray mongoose, and the monitor lizard. The mugger crocodile or marsh crocodile is a common inhabitant of the riverine reed beds. About 180 types of birds have been observed here. Breeding water birds include the painted stork, Asian openbill stork, common spoonbill, woolly-necked stork, black-headed ibis, black-headed ibis, lesser whistling duck, Indian shag, stork-billed kingfisher, and other common birds like egrets, cormorants, Oriental darter, and herons. The great stone plover, and the river tern also nest here. The park is home to a large flock of streak-throated swallows.

=== Libraries ===
- The Oriental Research Institute, formerly known as the Oriental Library and established in 1891, contains over 33,000 palm leaf manuscripts .
- Jayaprakash Nagar Mysore has a library with a collection of English and Kannada books, as well as a mini stadium, an open-air auditorium, a yoga centre and a 500-meter walking tack. The library is adjacent to a garden with a view of the Chamundi Hills.

== Around Mysore ==
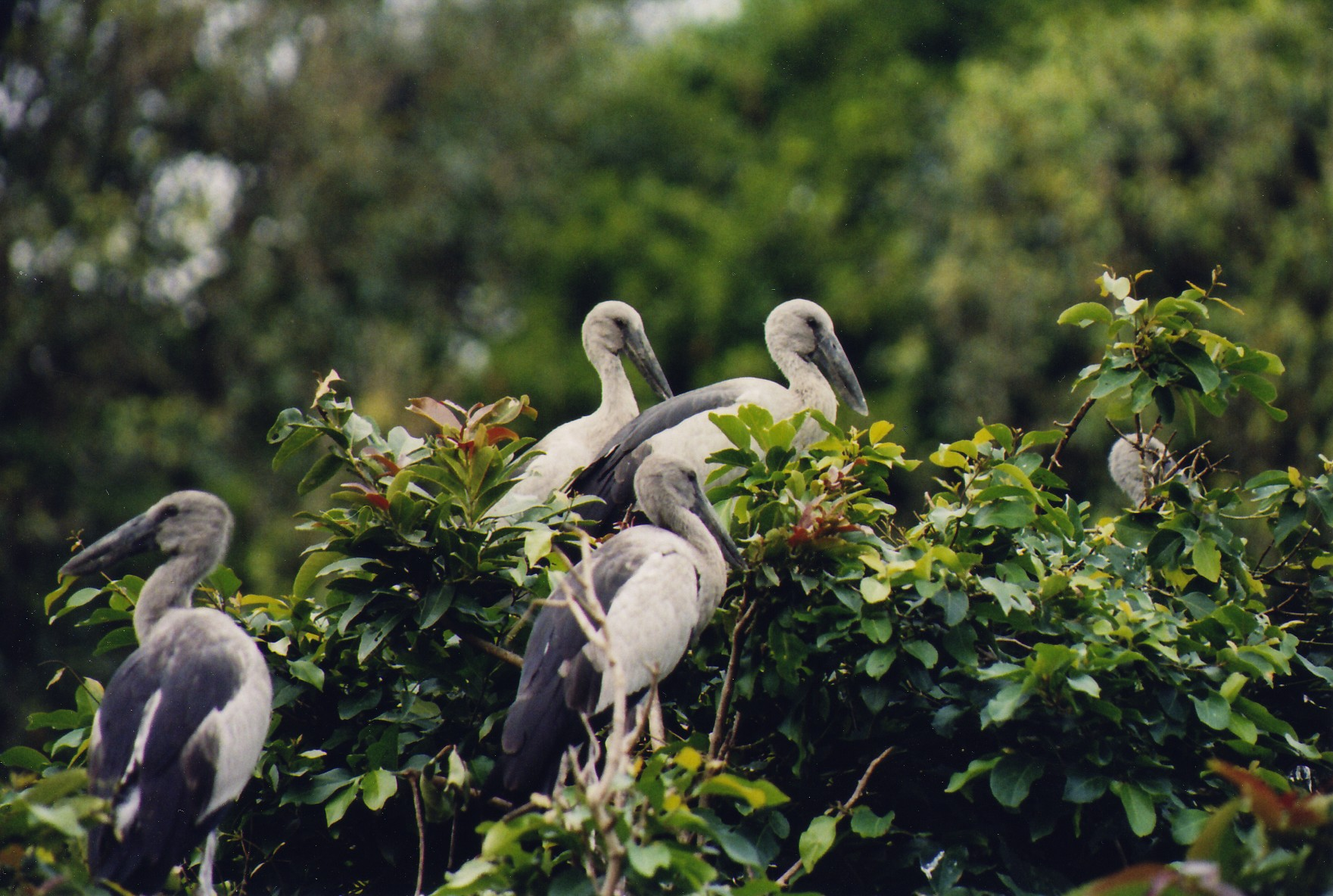
Open billed storks at Ranganathittu bird sanctuary

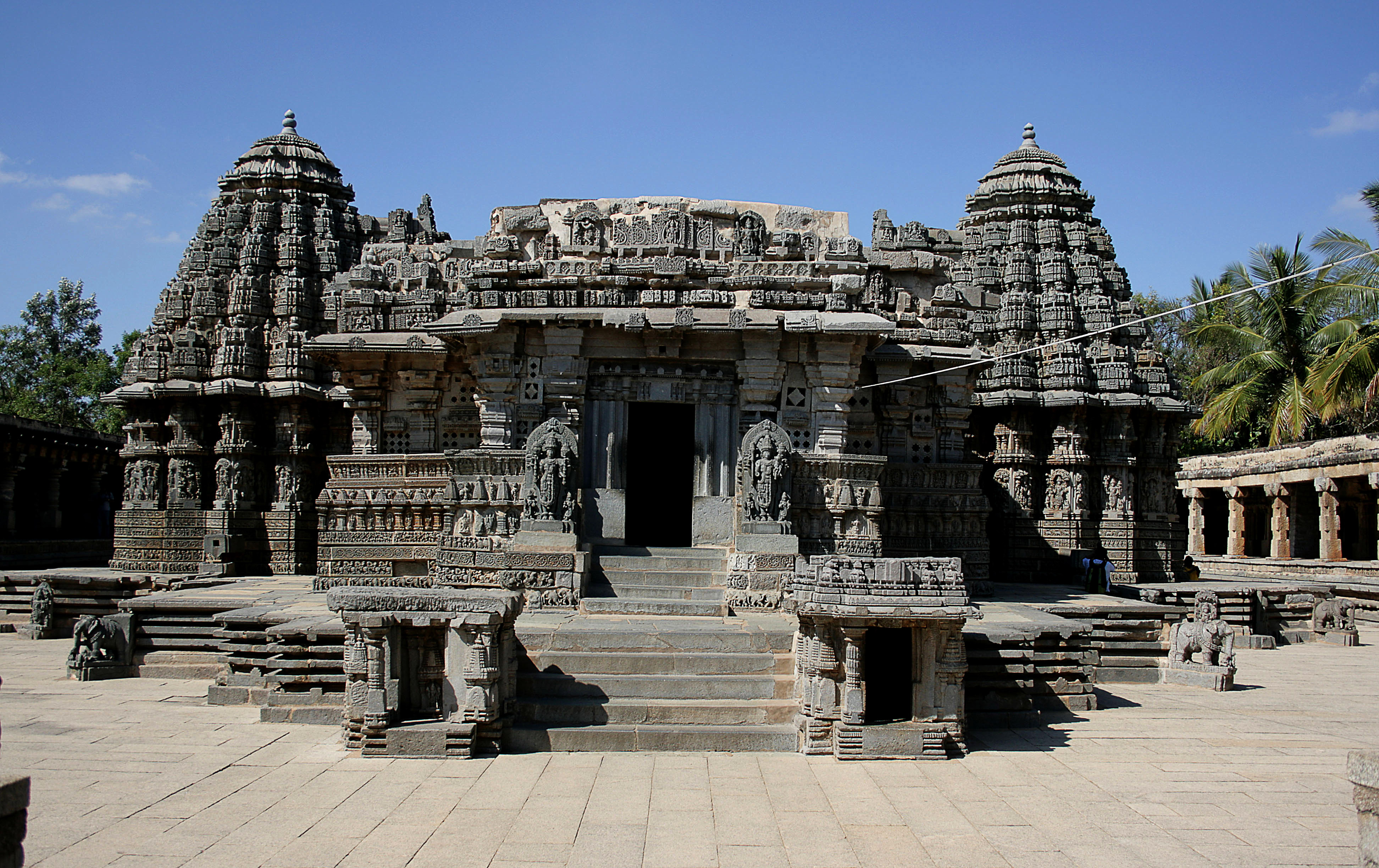
Chennakeshava temple at Somanathapura

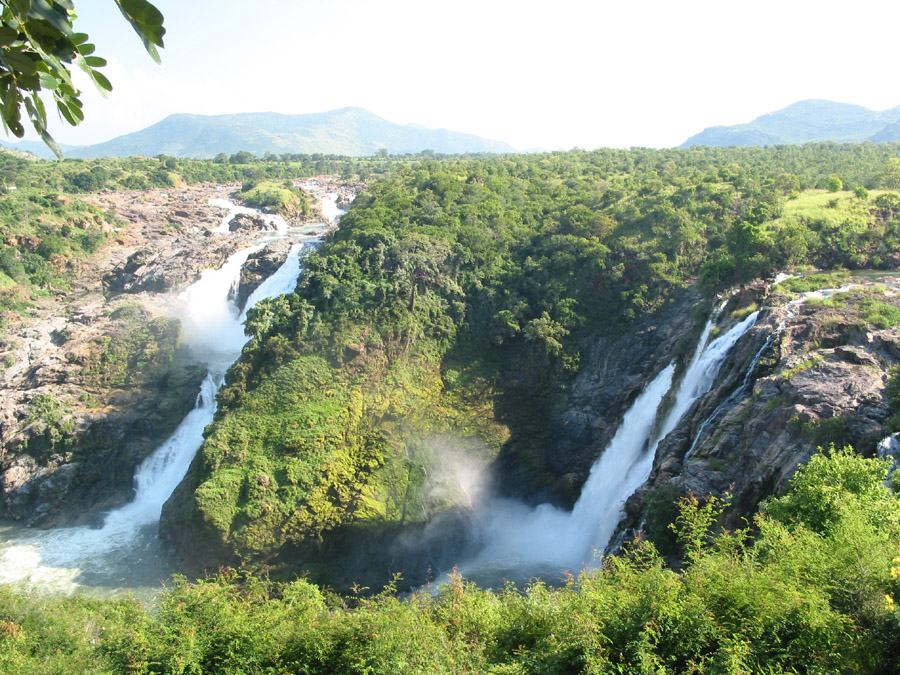
Shivanasamudra Falls

- Shivanasamudra Falls is the second-largest waterfall in India and the sixteenth largest in the world. It is situated on the banks of the river Kaveri and is the location of the first hydro-electric power station in Asia, which was set up in 1902. This is a segmented waterfall. Segmented waterfalls occur where the water flow is broken into two or more channels before dropping over a cliff, resulting in multiple side-by-side waterfalls. It has an average width of 849 meters, a height of 90 m, and an average water output volume of 934 cubic meters/sec. Gaganachukki on the left is a large horsetail waterfall and Barachukki (also spelled Bharachukki) in the centre is a jagged crashing cascading waterfall. During the monsoons this waterfall grows enormous, perhaps a thousand feet in width. The right waterfall is the Bharachukki. Asia's first hydro-electric power station, still functional, is located at the waterfall. This station was commissioned by the Diwan of Mysore, Sir K. Seshadri Iyer. The electricity produced here was initially used in the Kolar Gold Fields. Thus, Kolar Gold Fields became the first town in Asia to get hydro-electricity.

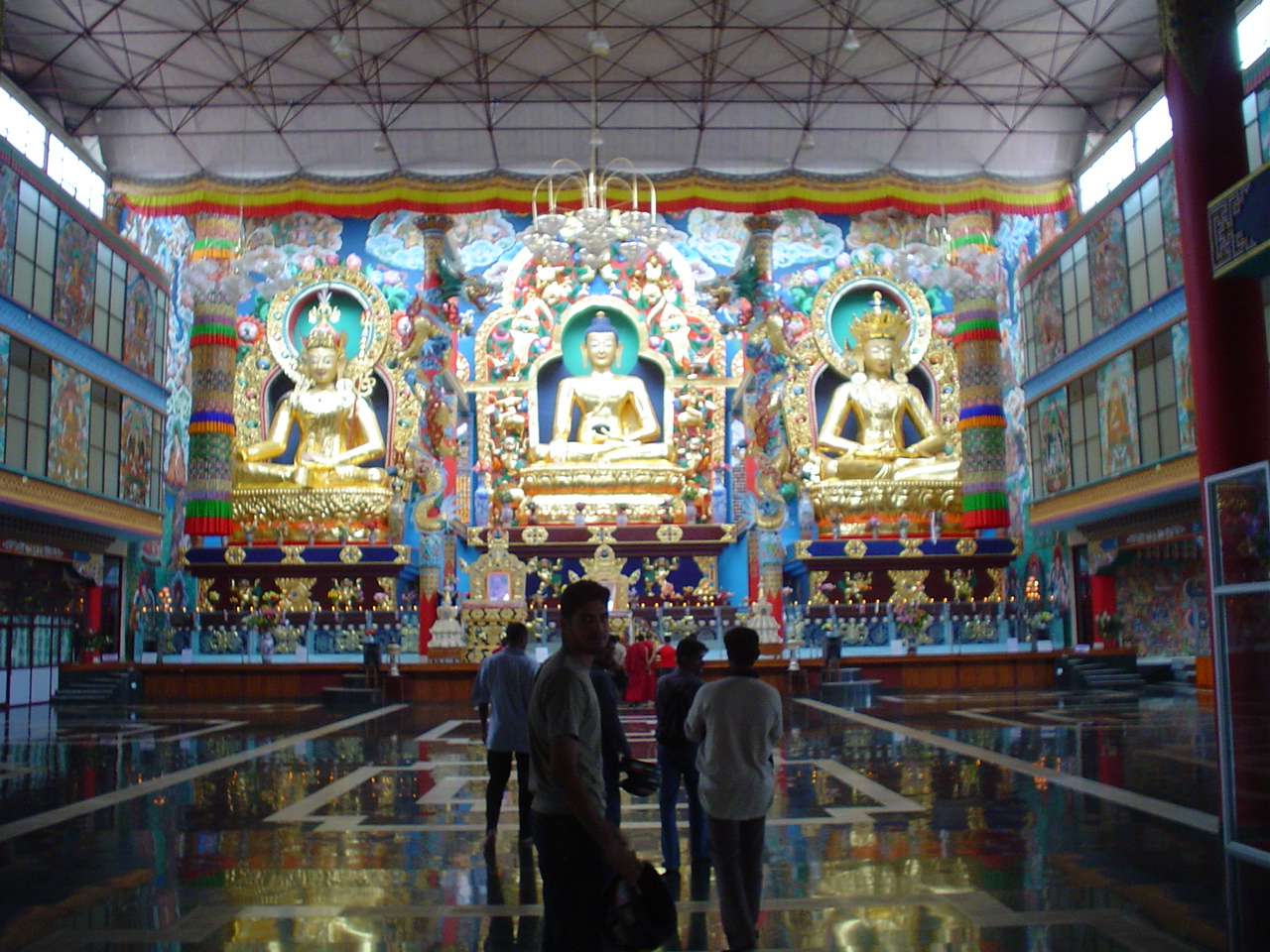
Inside the Golden Temple at Bylakuppe

- Bylakuppe is the location of "Lugsum Samdupling" (established in 1961) and "Dickyi Larsoe" (established in 1969), two adjacent Tibetan refugee settlements, in the west of the Mysore district. It consists of a number of small camps/agricultural settlements close to each other, and has a number of monasteries, nunneries, and temples in all the form of the major Tibetan Buddhist traditions. Most notable among them are the large educational monastic institution Sera, the smaller Tashilunpo monastery (both in the Gelukpa tradition), and the Namdroling monastery (in the Nyingma tradition). Particularly well known among the temples is the Golden Temple, which is also a major tourist spot in the area.
- Male Mahadeshwara Hills is a temple of the Mahadeshwara God, who stayed there in the 14th century and was a guru. It is about 180 km away from the city, located at Chamarajanagar district /ಚಾಮರಾಜನಗರ.

== Gallery ==
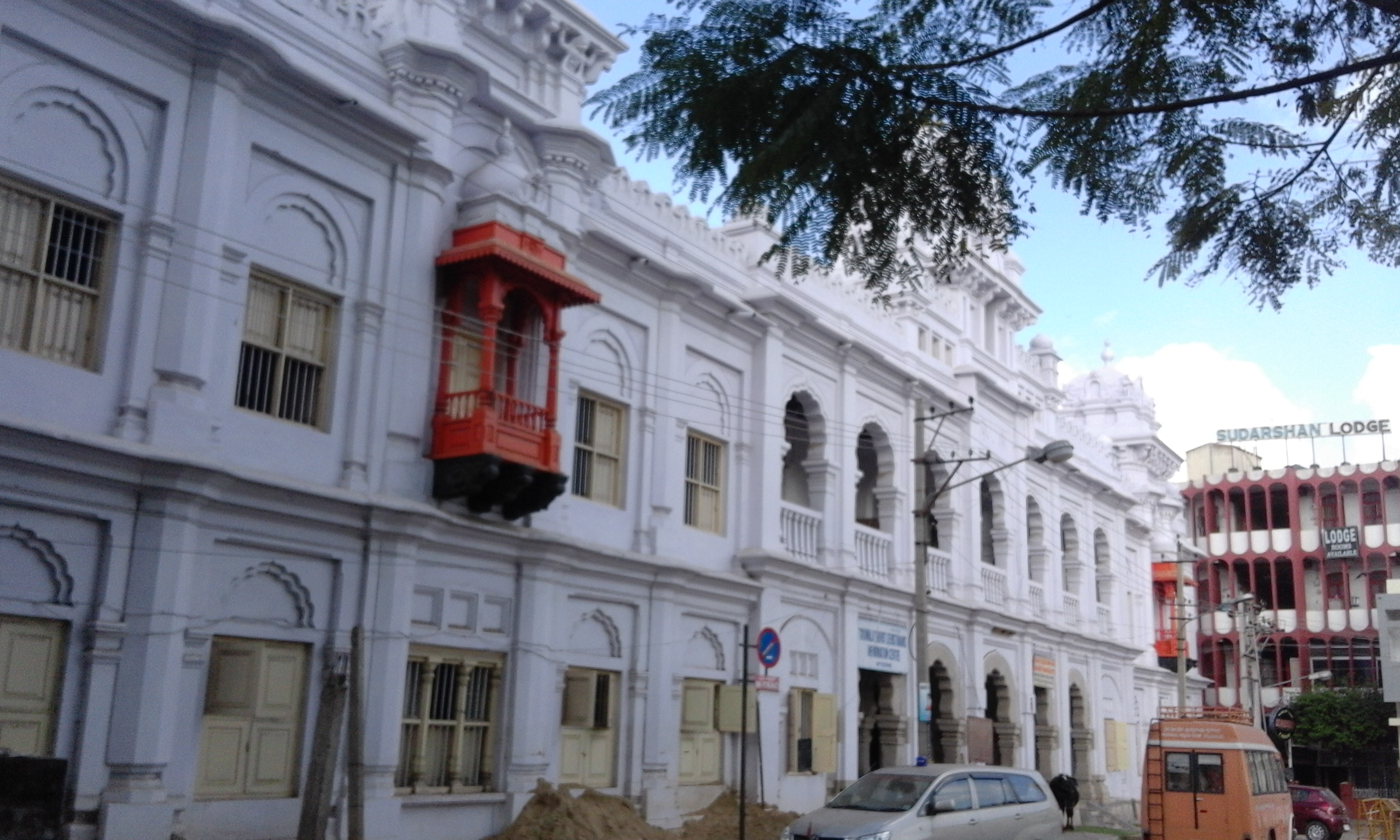
Temple Office near Jagamohan Palace

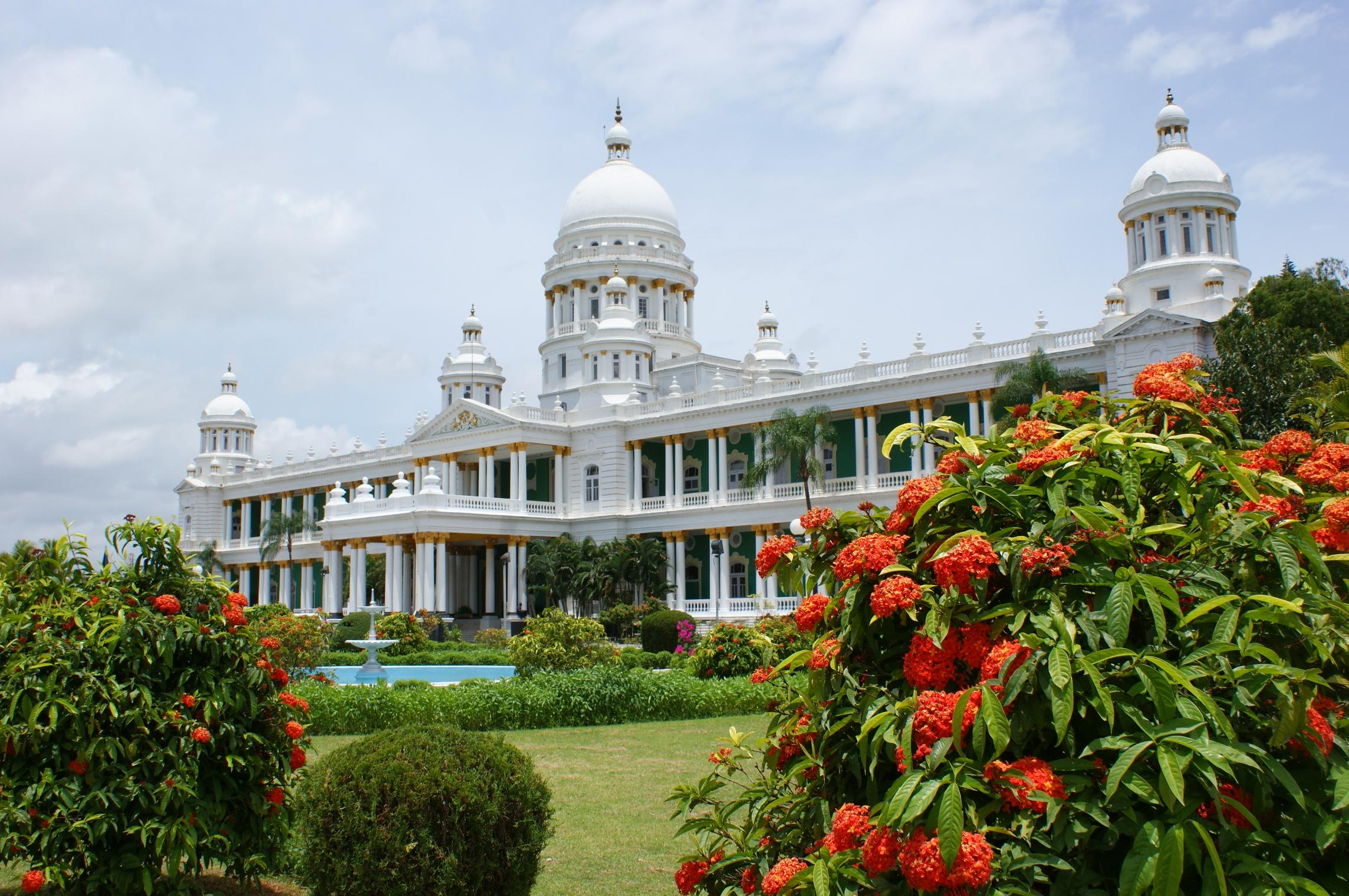
Lalitha Mahal, Mysore

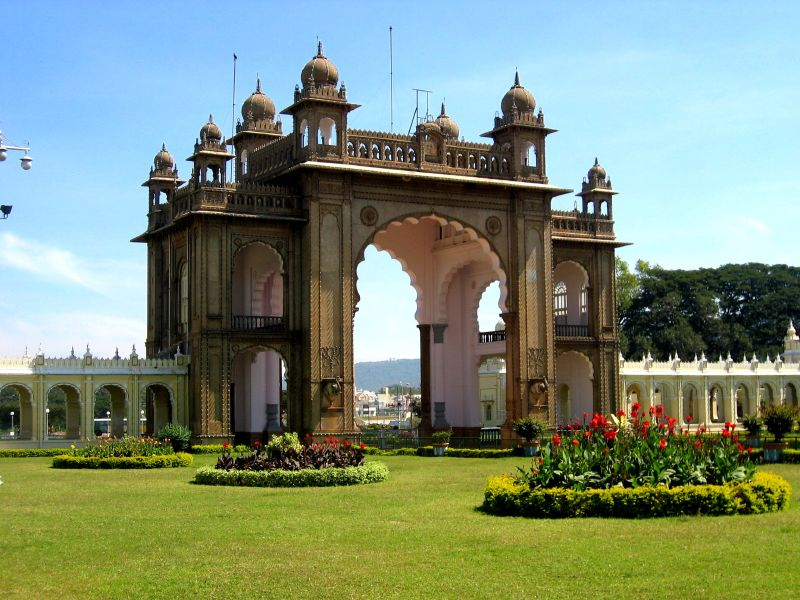
Entrance to the Ambavilas Palace, commonly known as Mysore Palace

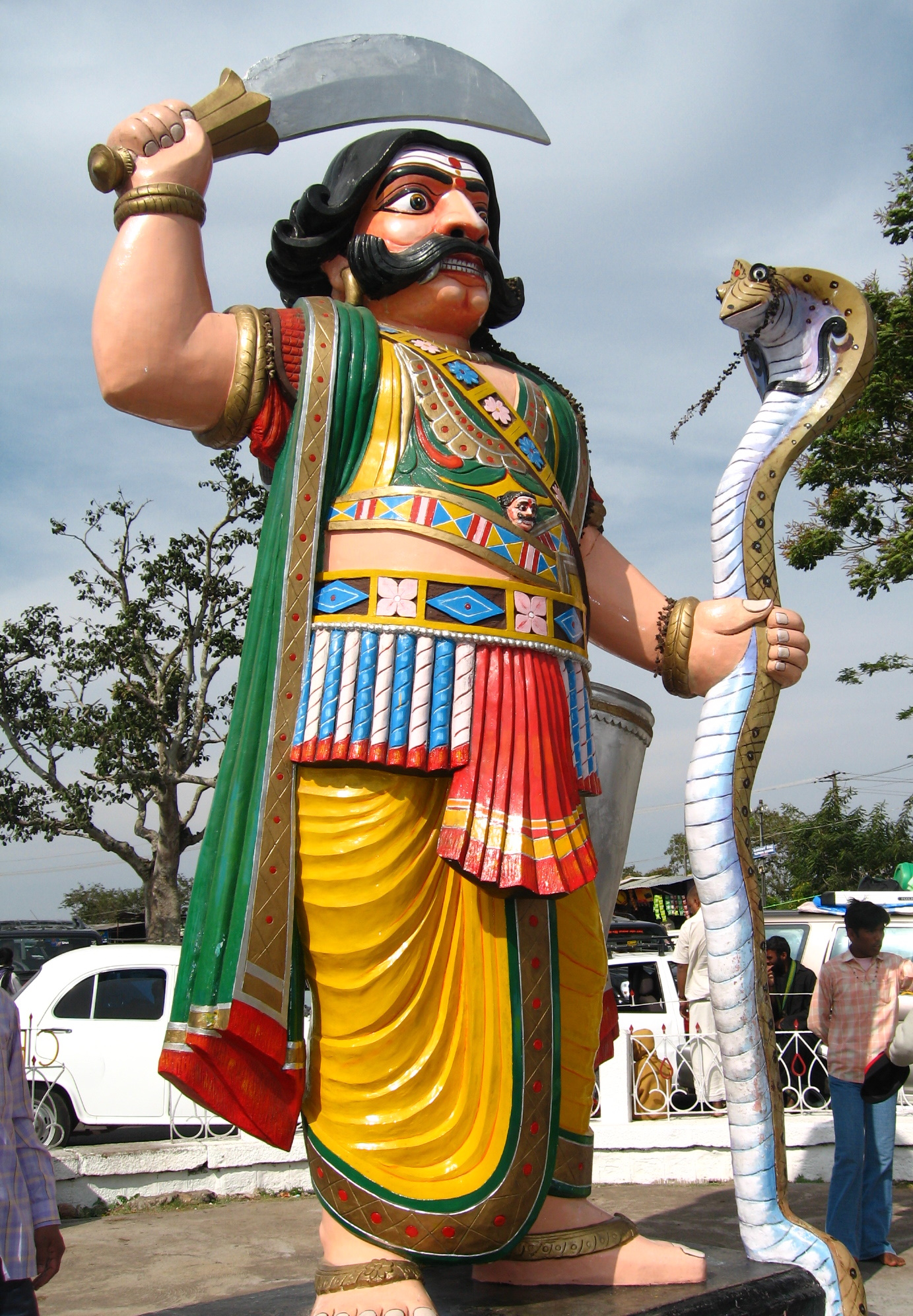
Statue of Mahishasura atop the Chamundi Hills

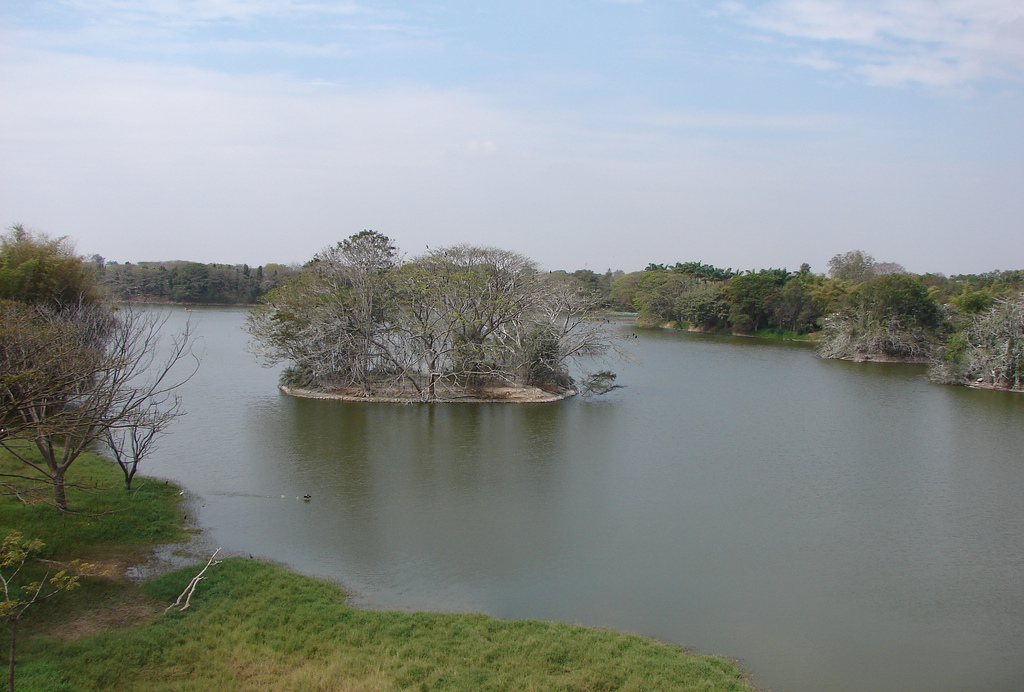
Karanji lake in Mysore

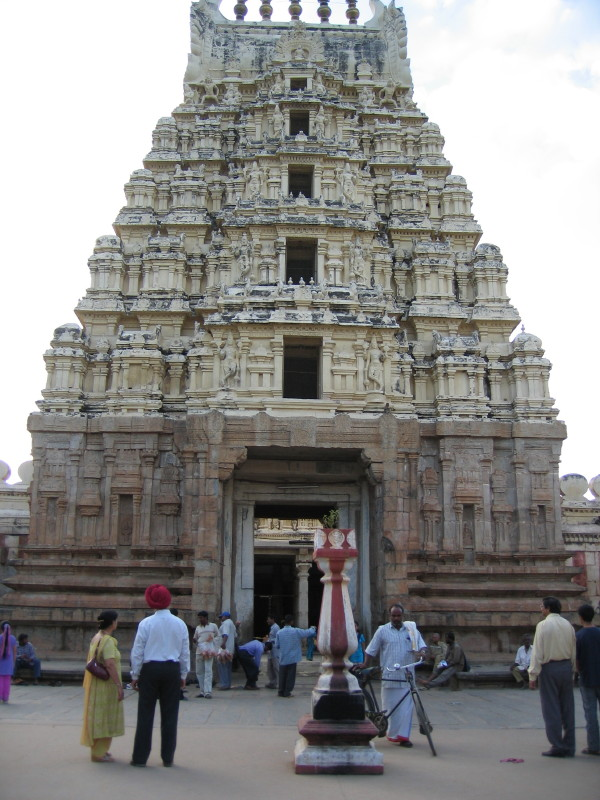
Ranganatha Temple

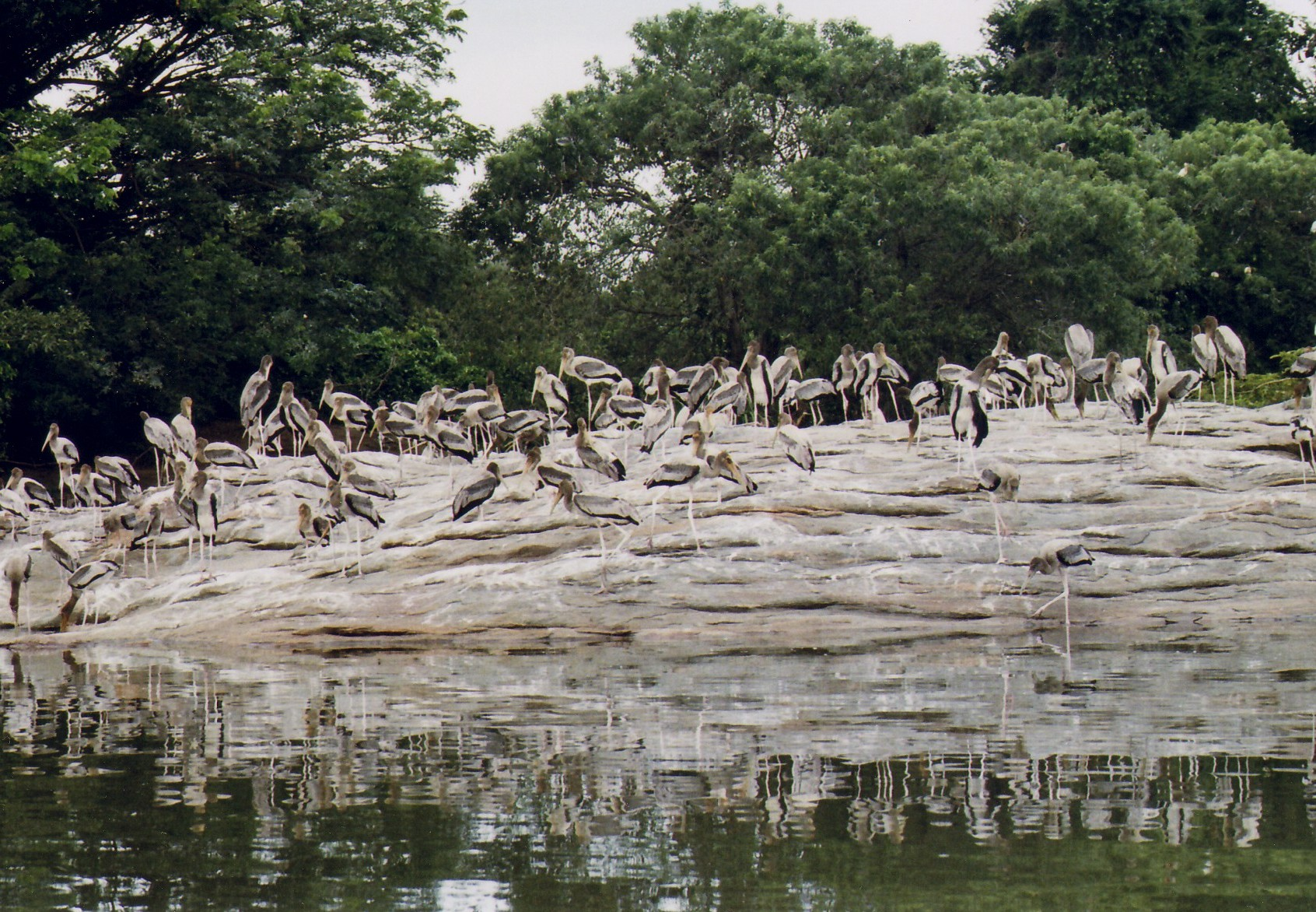
Painted stork colony, Ranganathittu

Sculpture from Talakadu Lord Shiva Temple.

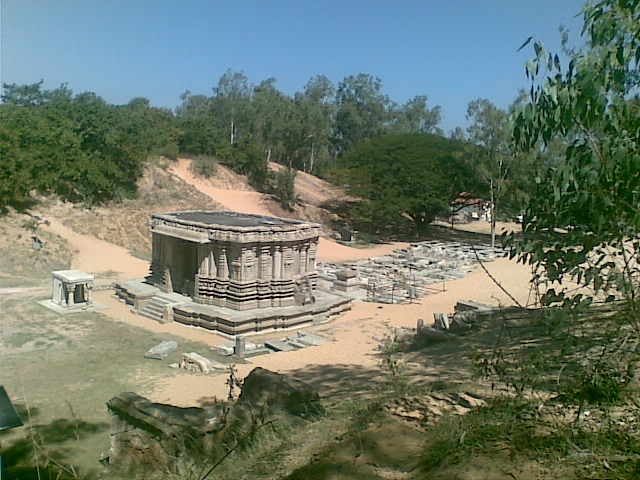
Temple recovered from sand dunes at Talakadu

== See also ==
- Ooty
- Culture of Mysore
- Bangalore
- Karnataka
- Tourist attractions in Bangalore
- Tourism in Karnataka
