= M N Gowri =

Indian sand artist

Gowri showing off her sand sculpture on Dasara at the Mysore Sand Sculpture Museum in Mysore

Gowri MN (born 30 August 1989) is an Indian sand artist from Mysore, Karnataka who has been working with sand for over seven years. She is the only female sand sculpture artist in India.

== Early life and background ==
Gowri has an MFA in sculpture from Karnataka State Open University. She has a diploma in machine tool technology, but discontinued engineering to pursue a career in sand sculpting.

== Career ==
Gowri created a sand museum using 115 truckloads of construction sand (river sand). About 150 sculptures have been created on 16 themes, including religion, astrology, and mythology, at the 13,500 sq ft museum.
