= Dick Stewart (TV host) =

American singer and actor (1928–2019)

- Born: Richard Eugene Stewart; April 22, 1928; Davenport, Iowa, U.S.
- Died: May 31, 2019 (aged 91)
- Occupation(s): Musician, author, television host
- Years active: 1953–2019
- Known for: The 1st Host of "The Dream Girl of 1967 (December 19, 1966-June 23, 1967: ABC-TV)"
- Spouse: Anne Randall (m. 1967)

Richard Eugene Stewart (April 22, 1928 – May 31, 2019) was an American singer, bandleader, actor, television host, and author. From 1959 to 1963, he hosted the popular televised music show, KPIX Dance Party.

== Early life ==
Stewart was born in Davenport, Iowa on April 22, 1928. In his preschool years, his family moved to Oakland, California. Stewart attended Cleveland Grammar School and Oakland High School in Oakland. He served in the U.S. Marine Corps. Stewart attended radio school on the GI bill.

== Career ==
For seven years, Stewart was a host for Southern California local television shows.

=== Actor ===
Stewart had a few acting roles. One was as Everett in the 1953 film The Glass Web which was directed by Jack Arnold. Other films include Good Morning, Miss Dove in 1955 and That's the Way of the World in 1975.

=== KPIX Dance Party (1959) host ===
Stewart took over the show, on 23 February 1959, to 1963, filling the position of the previous host Ted Randall who had resigned. Stewart got the position after being the winner in a series of auditions which were broadcast live. For the show Stewart would make his own choice and pick which records would be played instead of relying on an automated computerized system. He once said that he would "rather pick records that are wrong, and have fun with then, than be right to the point of dullness". One of his aims was to give the youngsters a more exciting, literate type of music. He would occasionally slip in some big band type music such as Lionel Hampton or Henry Mancini. Sometimes he would play the B-sides of singles which had local viewers playing both sides of the record.

=== DJ ===
Stewart was a radio DJ for KSFO on Sundays with an hour show.

=== Singer ===
As a singer, he performed at venues like the Off Broadway. In early 1962 he had a single out on the Penthouse label. It was "I Believe" bw "Without You". It was produced by George Motola. Around 1963, he recorded "I'll Change", which was produced by Al Hazan. The song was possibly intended for release on the Ava label but was rejected.

=== The Dream Girl of 1967 host ===
Stewart was the first host of the ABC-TV & Chuck Barris Game Show Beauty Pageant called The Dream Girl of 1967 from Monday December 19, 1966 to Friday June 23, 1967 except Bob Barker (Future Ex-Host of "The Price is Right" Guest Host for Monday-Friday June 12–16, 1967 for promoting Chuck Barris' New Game Show THE FAMILY GAME also on ABC-TV before Wink Martindale Hosted and his 2 Hostess are Beverly Adams (December 19–23, 1966) & Karen Valentine (December 26, 1966 – August 25, 1967.)

== Personal life and death ==
Dick Stewart remarried to Anne Randall. He had three children with his former wife, and raised them with Randall.

Stewart flew his own North American T-6 Texan, and survived a graveyard spiral.

In July 1994, Stewart retired to Sun City, Arizona. On May 31, 2019, his wife Anne announced that he had died earlier that day, at the age of 91.

== Discography ==
Singles
Title	Release info	Year	Notes
"C'est La Guerre" / "Roses, Roses, Roses"	HiFi Records R-503-45	1958	Credited to Dick Stewart and the Page Cavanaugh Trio
"I Believe" / "Without You"	Penthouse 1000	1962	
"I Believe" / "Without You"	Ava C-117	1963	
"The Summer's Over" / "Why Don't You Believe Me"	Gold Span 923	1963	
"The In-Between Years" / "Counting The Pieces"	Ava C-132	1963	

Albums
Title	Release info	Year	F	Notes
Dick Stewart Sings	HiFi Records R-401	1957	LP	
Dick Stewart Sings	Essential Media Group	2009	CD-R	
