= Kalashree Seashell Museum =

Sculpture museum in Mysore, India

Kalashree Seashell Museum is a museum in Mysore, India, which features sculptures made of seashell and conch. At the time of its inauguration in 2017, the museum exhibited 130 works of Radha Mallappa, including the world's tallest seashell sculpture of Ganesha (11 feet). Among other prominent works on display at the museum are a 10-foot tall Taj Mahal replica, a 12-foot tall idol of Shiva and a 13-foot tall model of St. Philomena's Church.

== See also ==
- Mysore Sand Sculpture Museum
