= Anne Randall =

American model and actress (born 1944)

- Born: Barbara Ann Burrus; September 23, 1944 (age 81)
- Spouse: Dick Stewart

Playboy centerfold appearance
- May 1967
- Preceded by: Gwen Wong
- Succeeded by: Joey Gibson

Personal details
- Born: Barbara Ann Burrus; September 23, 1944 (age 81) Alameda, California, U.S.
- Height: 5 ft 4 in (163 cm)

Anne Randall (born Barbara Ann Burrus; September 23, 1944) is an American model and actress. She was Playboy magazine's Playmate of the Month for its May 1967 issue. Her centerfold was photographed by Mario Casilli.

== Career ==
In 1959, Barbara became a regular on the KPIX Dance Party, an afternoon television show featuring teenagers dancing to popular music, broadcast on KPIX-TV Channel 5 (CBS) in San Francisco. It was hosted by Dick Stewart and aired from 1959 to 1963.

During the late 1960s and throughout the 1970s, Anne pursued a film and television career, appearing in such shows as Cannon, Barnaby Jones, and The Rockford Files. She also spent two years on Hee Haw.

In 1967, she married Dick Stewart and is sometimes credited as Anne Randall Stewart.

== Film and television work ==
- J-Men Forever (1979) (voice) (as Anne Randall Stewart)
- Switch - "Net Loss" (1977) TV Episode (as Anne Randall Stewart) .... Lena Ionescu
- Roger & Harry: The Mitera Target (1977) (TV) (as Anne Randall Stewart) .... Joanna March
- The Rockford Files - "The Trouble with Warren" (1976) .... Catherine Lefcourt
- Bronk - "Jailbreak" (1976) TV Episode (as Anne Randall Stewart)
- Hot L Baltimore - "Ainsley's Secret" (1975) TV Episode
- Barnaby Jones
  - "Forfeit by Death" (1974) .... Peggy Gibson
  - "To Catch a Dead Man" (1973) .... Billie Thompson
- Love, American Style
  - "Love and the Competitors/Love and the Forever Tree/Love and the Image Makers/Love and Mr. Bunny/Love and the Phobia" (1974) .... (segment "Love and the Image Makers")
  - "Love and the Caller/Love and the Secret Life/Love and the Swinging Philosophy/Love and the Woman in White" (1972) .... (segment "Love and the Caller")
- Cannon - "Trial by Terror" (1973) TV Episode
- Westworld (1973) .... Daphne, Servant Girl
- Stacey (1973) .... Stacey Hanson
- The Night Strangler (1973) (TV) (uncredited) .... Policewoman Sheila
- The Doris Day Show - "The Music Man" (1972) (TV)
- Hee Haw (1969) .... Herself (1972–1973)
- The Streets of San Francisco - "Tower Beyond Tragedy" (1972) .... Robin Short
- Get to Know Your Rabbit (1972) .... Stewardess
- Cade's County - "The Fake" (1972) .... Carla Ardmore
- Doomsday Voyage (1972) .... Katherine Jason
- Days of Our Lives (1965) .... Sheila Hammond #2 (1971–1972)
- Night Gallery - "Tell David"... (1971) .... Julie
- The Christian Licorice Store (1971) .... Texas Girl
- McCloud - "Somebody's Out to Get Jennie" (1971) .... Beverly
- Banyon (1971) (TV) .... Linda Hayden
- The Mod Squad - "The King of Empty Cups" (1970)
- Hell's Bloody Devils (1970) .... Amanda
- Model Shop (1969) .... Model No. 2
- A Time for Dying (1969) .... Nellie Winters
- The Split (1968) (uncredited) .... Negli's Girl
- The Monkees (1967) – Maiden #2 in S2:E3, "Everywhere a Sheik, Sheik"

== See also ==
- List of people in Playboy 1960–1969

Surrey Marshe	Kim Farber	Fran Gerard	Gwen Wong	Anne Randall	Joey Gibson
Heather Ryan	DeDe Lind	Angela Dorian	Reagan Wilson	Kaya Christian	Lynn Winchell
