= A Time for Dying =

1969 film by Budd Boetticher

- Theatrical release poster
- Directed by: Budd Boetticher
- Written by: Budd Boetticher
- Produced by: Audie Murphy
- Starring: Audie Murphy
- Cinematography: Lucien Ballard
- Edited by: Harry Knapp
- Music by: Harry Betts
- Production company: FIPCO
- Release date: September 15, 1969
- Running time: 73 minutes
- Country: United States
- Language: English

A Time for Dying is a 1969 American Western film written and directed by Budd Boetticher with a cameo role by Audie Murphy, who also produced the film, as Jesse James. It was Murphy's last film, as well as the final dramatic feature for Boetticher.

== Plot ==
Cass Bunning (Richard Lapp), a farm boy with a talent for shooting, meets up with Nellie (Anne Randall), a naive woman from the East, who has been lured West by the promise of a waitressing job which turns out to be in a brothel. Cass helps Nellie escape and the two are forced into marriage by Judge Roy Bean (Victor Jory). Cass decides to become a bounty hunter. He crosses paths with Jesse James (Audie Murphy) who, impressed by Cass' shooting, suggests he join his gang, but Cass declines. Cass is killed in a shootout with the outlaw Billy Pimple (Bob Random), and Neillie is left on her own in the brothel.

== Cast ==
- Richard Lapp as Cass Bunning
- Anne Randall as Nellie
- Audie Murphy as Jesse James
- Victor Jory as Judge Roy Bean
- Beatrice Kay as Mamie
- Bob Random as Billy Pimple
- Peter Brocco as Ed
- Burt Mustin as Seth

== Production ==
Audie Murphy's career was in a bad state and he had not made a film in 1968, the first year that happened since he started starring in films. Boetticher, who directed Murphy on The Cimarron Kid, was going through a similar slump. The two men formed their own company, Fipco (First International Planning Company) to make films. This was planned to be the first of several.

A Time for Dying was to originally star Peter Fonda as the kid. Shooting took place at the Apacheland Movie Ranch near Tucson in April and May 1969. Money was tight and by the time filming was completed the movie was several minutes shorter than scripted. Murphy spent the next year and a half trying to raise additional funds for completion and post-production. Two of Murphy's sons made their motion picture debut appearing in small roles in the film, with Murphy's long term Associate Willard Willingham playing Frank James.

Boetticher later said "Audie got in real trouble with some people in Las Vegas, and he needed a director to make a picture, and he would be the producer. He was a friend, and he was in trouble, so I made the picture for him. But then Audie was killed in a plane crash shortly after the film was finished (on May 28, 1971), so the whole thing was just tragic."

== Release ==
A rough cut of the film premiered at the National Film Theatre in London on May 27, 1969. The finished version of the film premiered in Dallas, Texas on September 15, 1969.

The film was shown throughout Texas, but following legal problems after Murphy's death in 1971, the film only had limited showings and did not screen in New York until 1982.

== See also ==
- List of American films of 1969
