= Doomsday Voyage =

Doomsday Voyage is a 1972 American film originally known as Questions

It was one of the first films available for hire in hotel rooms.

== Cast ==
- Joseph Cotten as Captain John Jason
- John Gabriel as James Wilson—the assassin
- Anne Randall as Catherine Jason
- Charles Durning as Robson
- Preston Pierce as Second Mate
- James Edwards as Federal officer
- William Bonner as Bosun
- Albert Cole as Steward
- Edwin Byrd as Politician [Philip Fredericks]
- Elaine Aiken as Politician's wife [Mrs. Fredericks]
- Curt Matson as Newscaster
- Peter Hock as Dock laborer
