= KPIX Dance Party =

- Presented by: Dick Stewart
- Country of origin: United States

Original release
- Release: 1959 – 1963

KPIX Dance Party was an afternoon television show hosted by Dick Stewart which was broadcast on CBS KPIX-TV Channel 5 in San Francisco. It ran from 1959 to 1963. It featured teenagers dancing to popular music.

== Background ==
The original host of the show was Ted Randall. After he resigned from the position, KPIX held some auditions to find a replacement. The winner of the auditions which were broadcast was Dick Stewart. His actual starting date with the show was February 23, 1959. Stewart was a musician in his own right, having led his own band. He was also an actor. The director and producer of the show was Bill Hollenbeck, formerly of KGO-TV where he had held the positions of producer, director and program manager. He joined the outfit in 1961. It was announced in Billboard in the January 1963 edition that the show which was being aired 5 afternoons a week had been cut back to one.

The four years that Stewart spent with the show elevated his popularity.

== Acts ==
Barbara Bouchet was a dancer on the show when she was a teenager. She later went on to act in films such as Sweet Charity, and The Diamond Connection.

Paul Mooney was a dancer on the show. He skipped school one day and managed to convince the producer he could dance. He was told he would start at 3pm that day.

Joe Piazza and the Continentals were one group that played regularly on the show, and were essentially considered the show's house band. The lineup was Johnny Johnson, Dan, Joe Piazza, Jim Lufrano and Jerry Martini. The group provided music for events such as the Twist Party, which was hosted by Dick Stewart. At one stage, Sylvester Stewart was a member of the group, and they even played on the song "Yellow Moon" which was a hit for his group The Viscaynes. They had also backed Janet Ericco on an early recording, "It Was A Lie" bw "Come Along With Me" using the pseudonym The Twilights.

Lynn Facciola and Frank Pisa were frequently on the show.

Anne Randall was one of "the regulars" on the show. She started on the show at the age of 14. She spent two years dancing on the show and was still attending school at the time. She would eventually become an actress as well as becoming host Stewart's wife.
