= Mysore Sand Sculpture Museum =

First sand sculpture museum in India

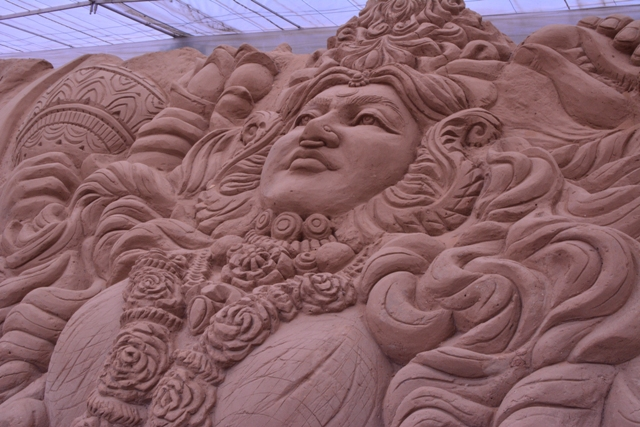
- Sand sculpture of Hindu goddess Chamundeshwari at the museum.
- Established: 2014
- Location: Chamundi Hills Road, Mysore, Karnataka, India
- Coordinates: 12.29498°N 76.68200°E
- Type: Sand sculpture
- Founder: MN Gowri

Mysore Sand Sculpture Museum is the first sand sculpture museum in India, located in Mysore, Karnataka. It was inaugurated in 2014, with 150 sand sculptures on display, on a one-acre land at the base of Chamundi Hills. Each of the sculptures was created by sand artist MN Gowri and based on a theme such as Mysore's cultural heritage, wildlife and religion.

== History ==
After dropping out during the second year of her mechanical engineering course, MN Gowri received training in computer animation during which she created three-dimensional models using 3ds Max software. As the sculptures created on computer did not have the "feeling of life", she tried out sand sculpting for the first time in 2011. Upon receiving appreciation for her work, she decided to start a sand sculpture museum on a one-acre leased land at the base of Chamundi Hills, by taking a loan of ₹20 lakh.

The museum was inaugurated in 2014, with 115 truckloads of construction sand being used to create 150 sculptures. The sculptures covered up to 16 different themes, largely dealing with Mysore's cultural heritage, wildlife and religion (mainly Hinduism, Islam and Christianity). Among the subjects of the sculptures displayed at the museum were Ganesha, Mysore Dasara, Santa Claus, Christmas tree, zodiac wheel, Islamic culture, Disneyland, marine life, Laughing Buddha, Chamundeshwari, Gitopadesha and Cauvery River.

In 2017, a three-dimensional selfie gallery was introduced at the museum.

== Maintenance ==
The sculptures are preserved within the museum's metal enclosing, with the overhead waterproof sheets allowing sunlight to pass through. Sculptures are brushed and remade every week in case of damages. According to Gowri, "the biggest challenge" is protecting the sculptures from insects and rodents, despite the usage of insecticides and pesticides.

== See also ==
- Kalashree Seashell Museum
