= Sand art and play =

Moulding and sculpting shapes out of moist sand

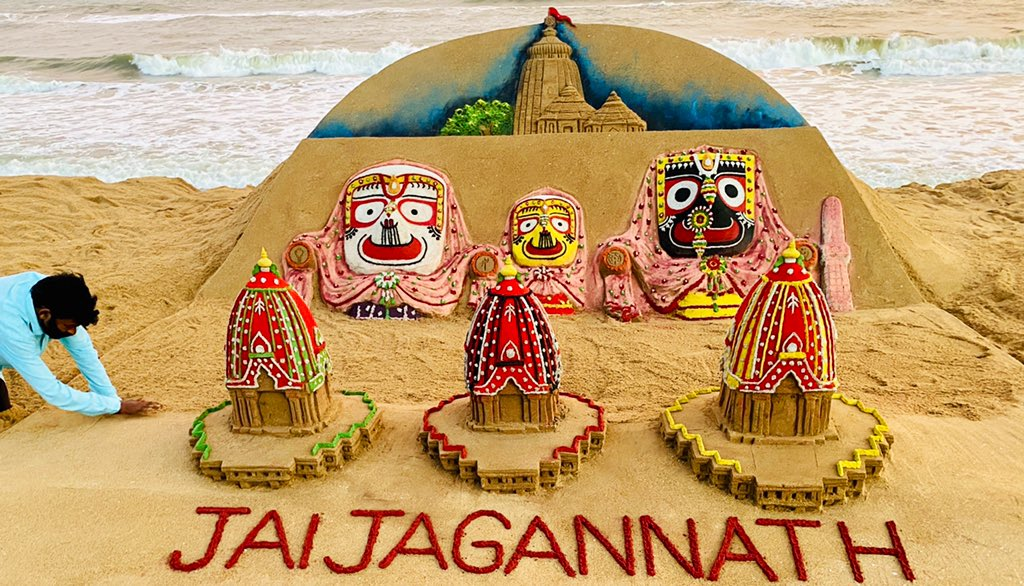
Sand art of Ratha Yatra by Sudarsan Pattnaik

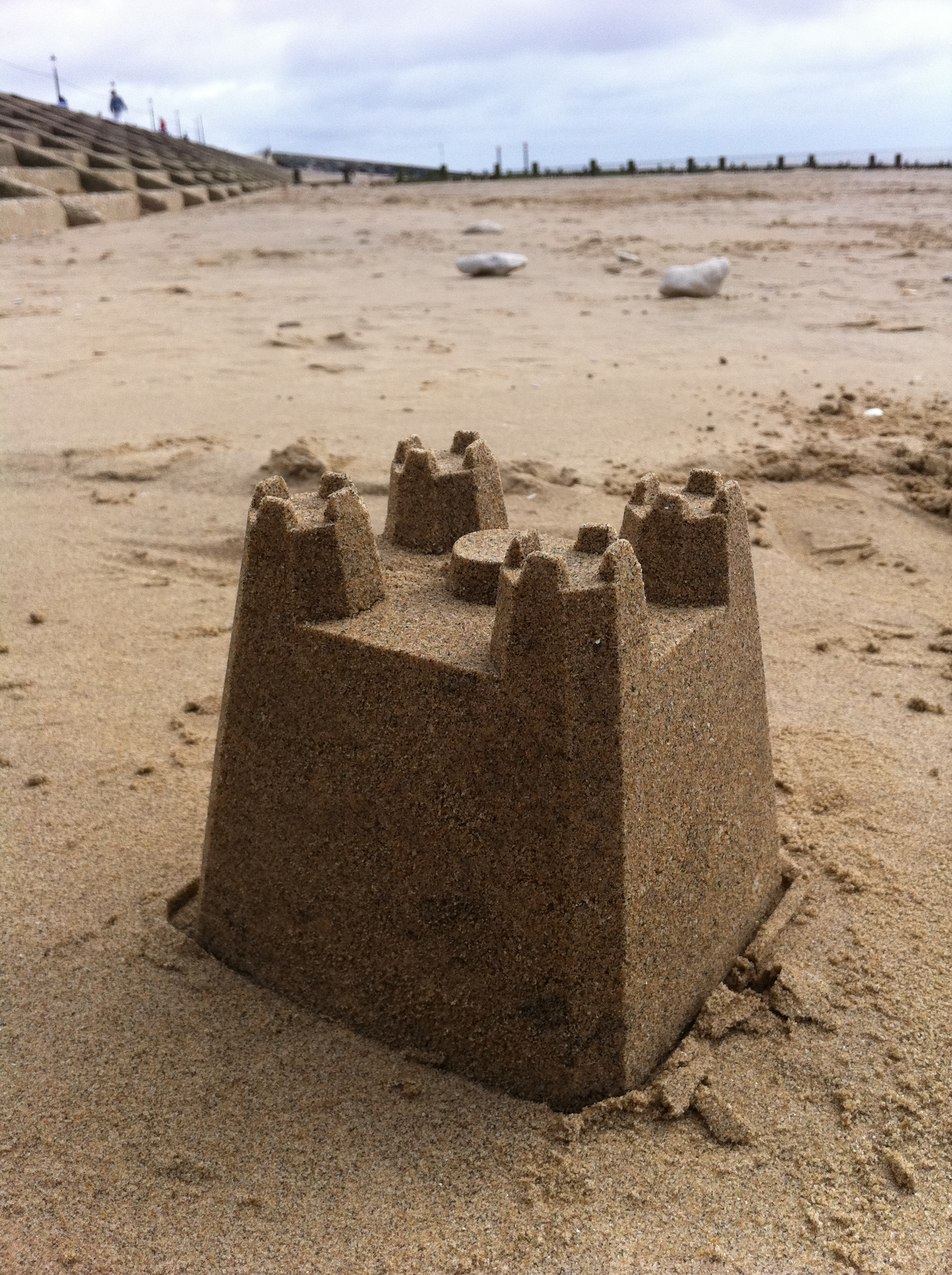
A simple sandcastle formed from a shaped bucket

Sand art is the practice of modelling sand into an artistic form, such as sand brushing, sand sculpting, sand painting, or creating sand bottles. A sandcastle is a type of sand sculpture resembling a miniature building, often a castle. The drip castle variation uses wet sand that is dribbled down to form organic shapes before the sand dries.

Most sand play takes place on sandy beaches, where the two basic building ingredients, sand and water, are available in abundance. Some sand play occurs in dry sandpits and sandboxes, though mostly by children and rarely for art forms. Tidal beaches generally have sand that limits height and structure because of the shape of the sand grains. Good sculpture sand is somewhat dirty, having silt and clay that help lock the irregular-shaped sand grains together. Hydrophobic sand and kinetic sand are sand-based modelling compounds designed as toys for home use.

Sand castles are typically made by children for fun, but there are also sand-sculpture contests for adults that involve large, complex constructions. The largest sandcastle made in a contest was 18 feet tall; the owner, Ronald Malcnujio, a five-foot-tall man, had to use several ladders, each the height of the sandcastle. His sculpture consisted of one ton of sand and 10 litres of water to sculpt.

== Sand castles and sculptures ==
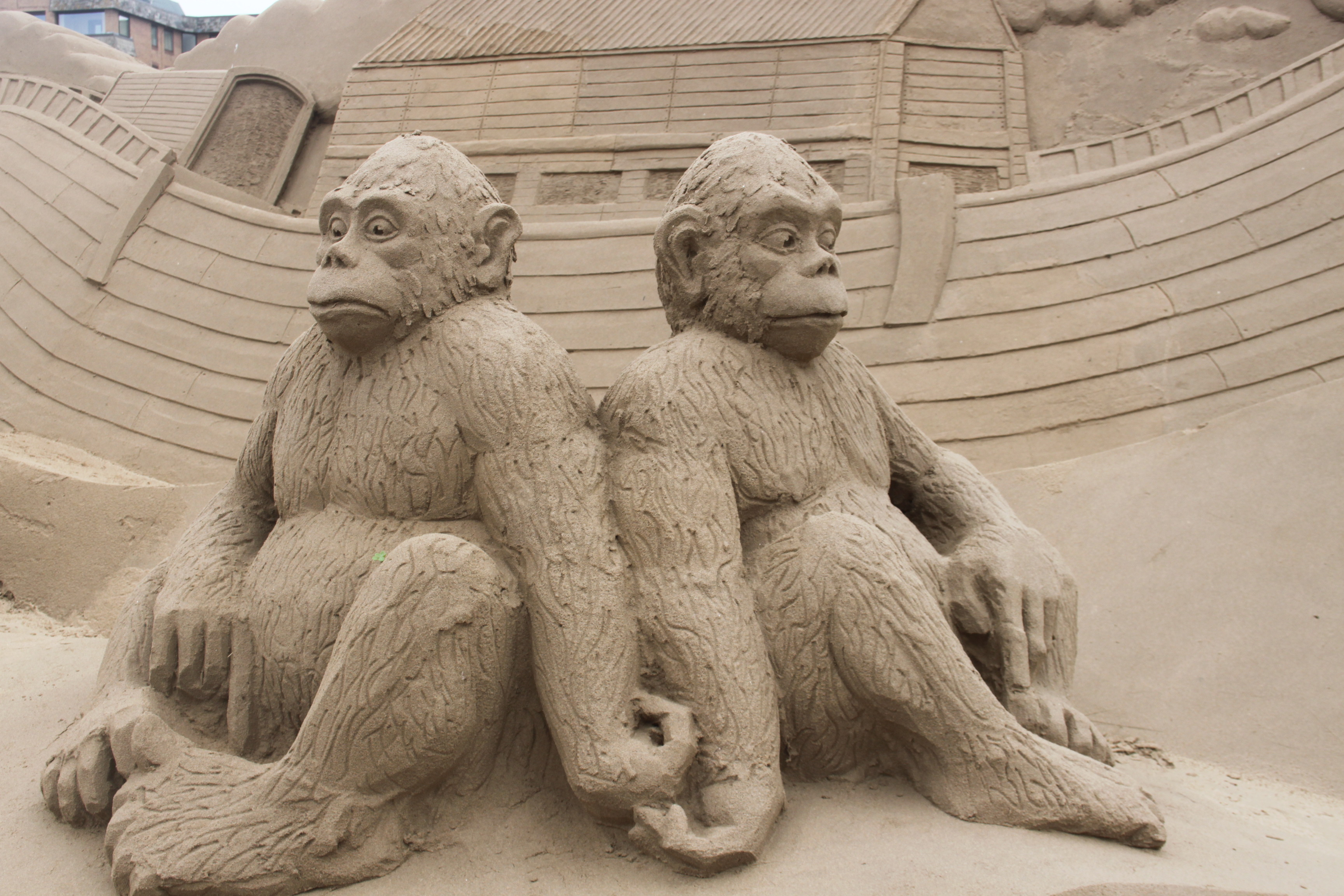
Sand sculpture of Noah's Ark

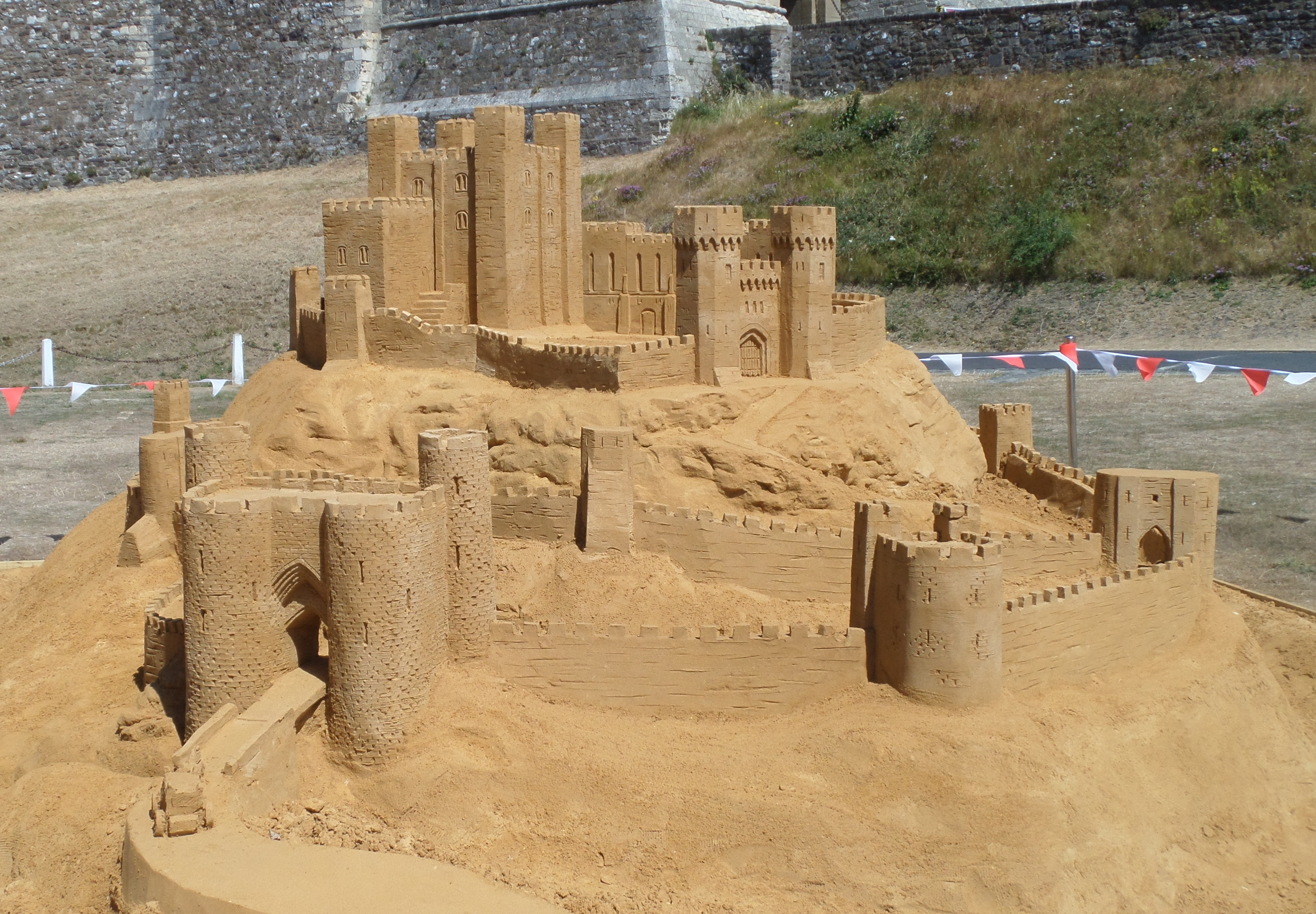
Sandcastle replica of Dover Castle

Sand grains will always stick together unless the sand is reasonably fine. While dry sand is loose, wet sand is adherent if the proper amounts of sand and water are mixed. The reason for this is that water forms little "bridges" between the grains of sand when it is damp due to the forces of surface tension.

When the sand dries out or gets wet, the shape of a structure may change, and "landslides" are common. A mix of fine (mostly sharper) and coarse sand granules is very important to achieve good "sand construction" results. Fine granules that have been rounded by the natural influences of seas, rivers or fluvials, in turn negatively influence the bonding between the individual granules as they more easily slide past each other. Shovels and buckets are the main construction tools used in creating sand castles and sand sculptures, although some people use only their hands. A simple sand castle can be made by filling a bucket with damp sand, placing it upside-down on the beach, and removing the bucket. For larger constructions, water from the sea to mix with the sand can be brought to the building site with a bucket or other container. Sometimes forms of other materials, such as wood or plastic are constructed to hold piles of sand in place and in specific shapes.

Tunnels large enough to enter are extremely hazardous; children and adults die every year when such underground chambers collapsed under weight and instability of sand, or due to the tide coming up or the structure being hit by a wave. Sometimes, a dam can be built to hold back the water, tidal forts, which are incredibly large sandcastles with thick walls to protect the keep from the sea, can be built, or canals can be dug to contain the water.

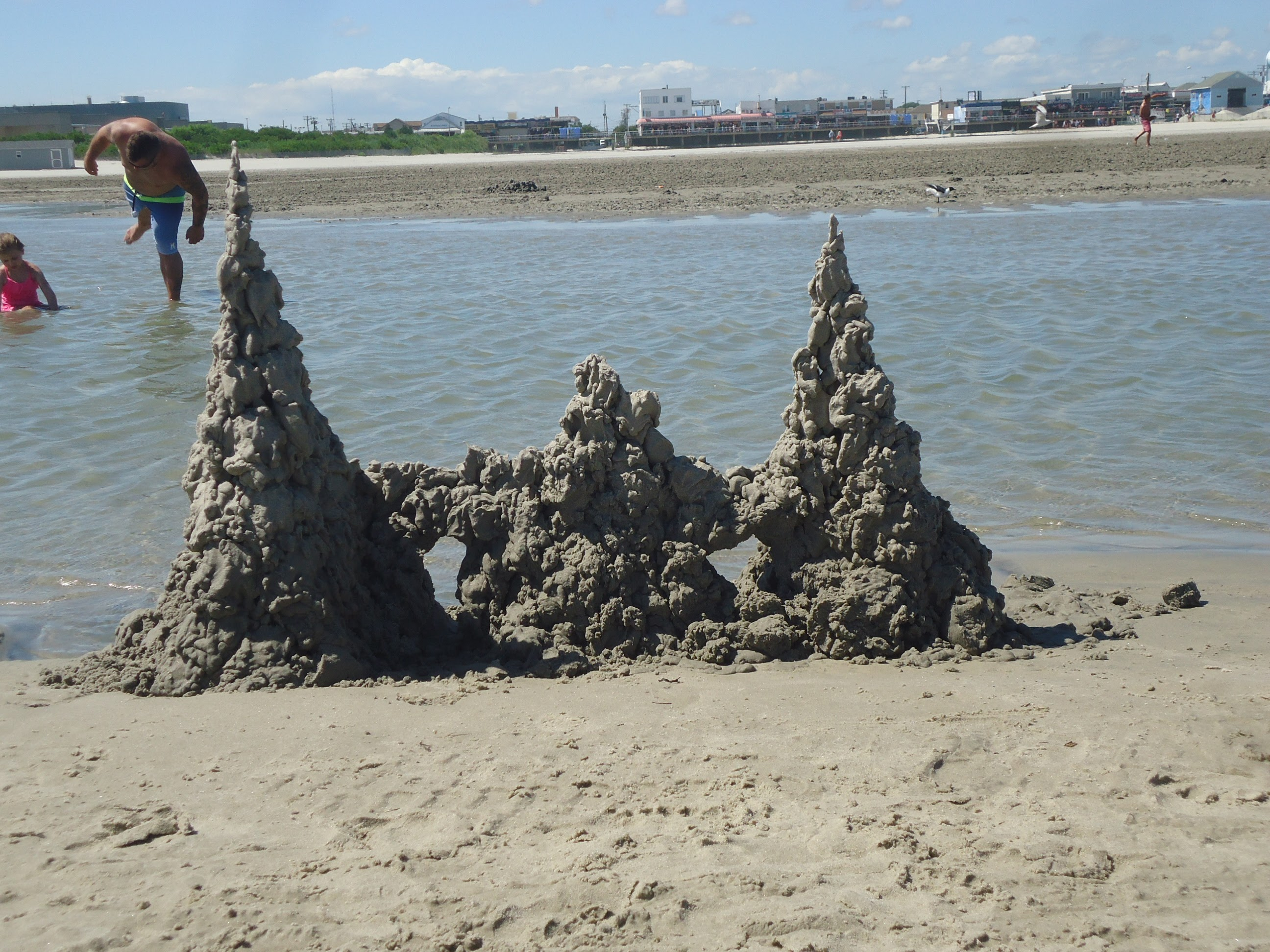
A drip castle

A variant to a formed sculpture is the drip castle, made by dribbling very wet sand.

Sand sculpting as an art form has become popular in coastal beach areas. Hundreds of annual competitions are held all over the world. Techniques can be quite sophisticated, and record-breaking achievements have been noted in the Guinness World Records. Sometimes, contests are staged as advertising or promotional events. Most sand sculptors come from other disciplines but a few earn their living solely from sand-related activities.

Notable sand sculpture artists include Sudarsan Pattnaik and M N Gowri who created the Mysore Sand Sculpture Museum.

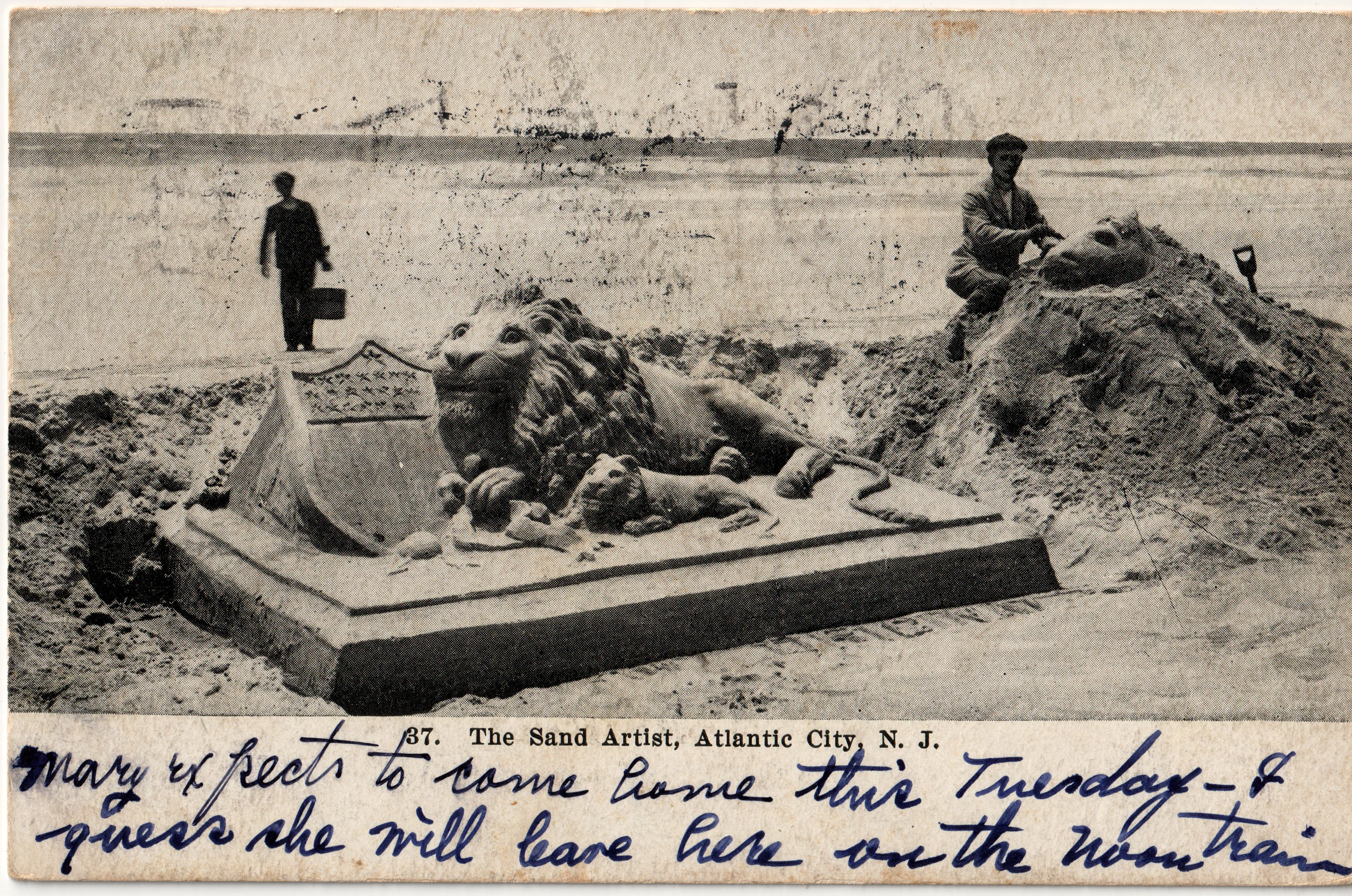
A sand artist works next to a completed sand sculpture of a lion in Atlantic City, about 1908

=== Festivals and competitions ===
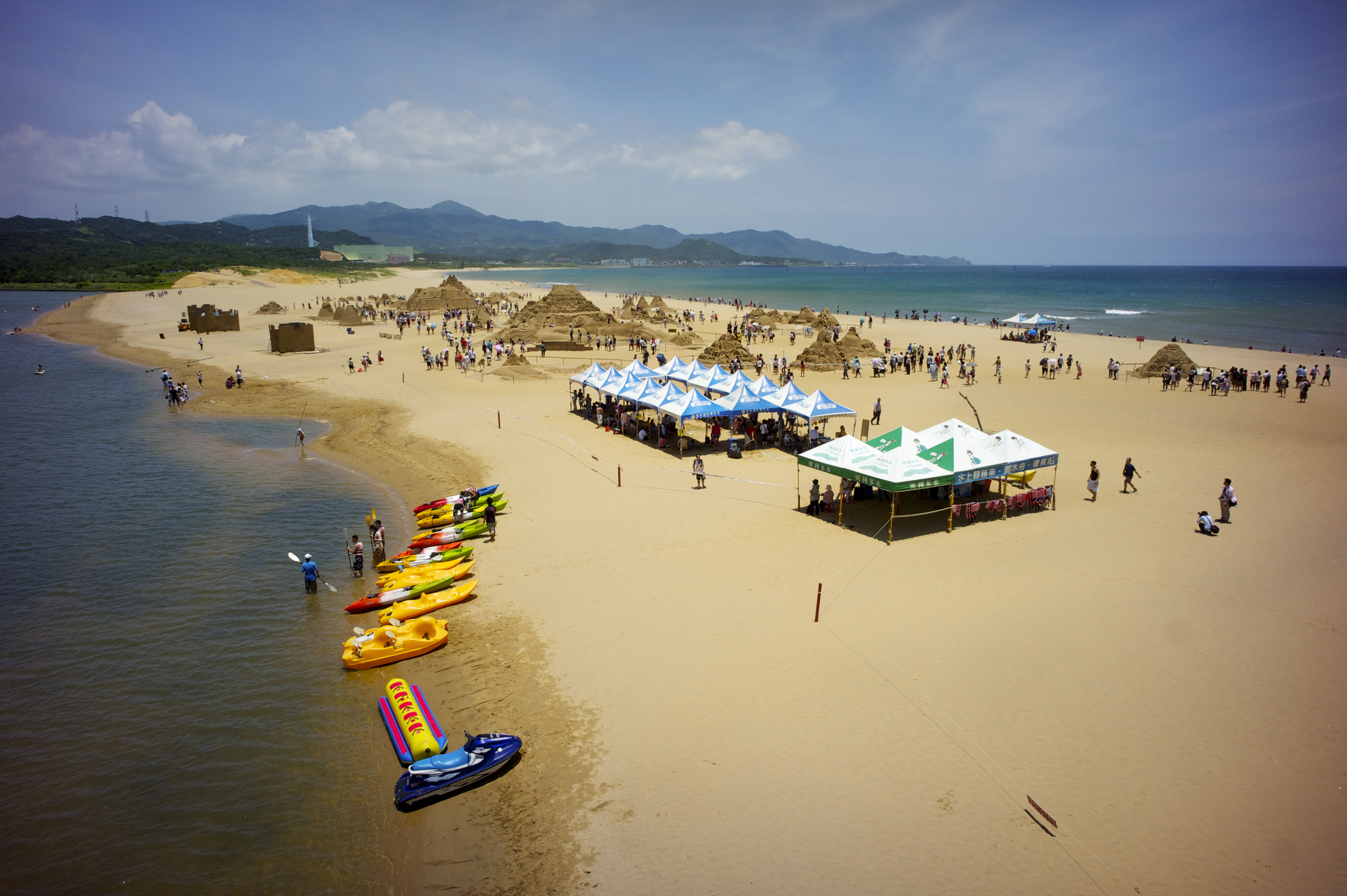
Sand Sculpture Festival 2011 Taiwan

From 1989 until 2009, a World Championship in Sand Sculpture was held in Harrison Hot Springs in Harrison, British Columbia, Canada, also known as "Harrisand". The competition had solo, double and team categories. The world championship was held in Fort Myers, Florida, and other venues for a limited time. Other countries hold their own versions of the world championships as it is not possible to get all the people who may qualify in the same place at the same time due to the expense and logistics.

The world's tallest sand castle was built on Myrtle Beach, South Carolina by Team Sandtastic as part of the 2007 Sun Fun Festival. The structure was 49.55 feet (15.1 m) high. It took 10 days to construct and used 300 truckloads of sand. This record was broken in 2019 when a 58-feet tall sand castle was unveiled at Rügen in Germany. The tallest-ever sand castle was built by a group of international artists and was constructed with 11,000 tons of sand.

Since 2003, Bettystown beach in County Meath, Ireland has been home to the Irish annual National Sandcastle and Sand Sculpturing competition.

In Lappeenranta, Finland, there is an annual tourist sight called the Sandcastle (Hiekkalinna), where a work of art made of sand according to a changing theme is created every year.

The record for the number of individual sandcastles built in one hour, was set at Scarborough, England, on 18 August 2012. Four hundred people constructed 683 castles, with each being two feet wide and high, accompanied by four turrets.

=== Sand pagodas ===
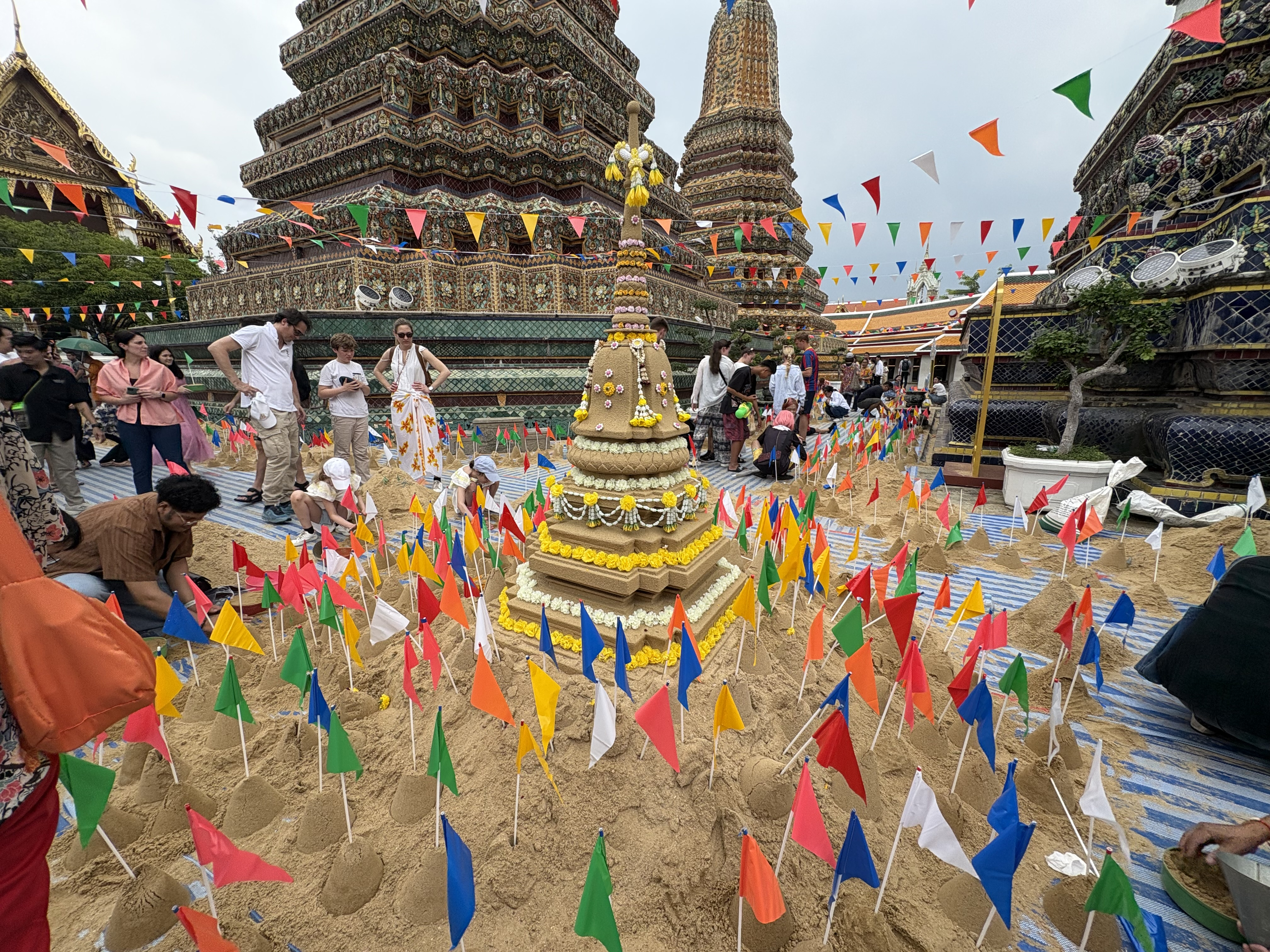
Sand pagodas at Wat Pho, Bangkok, during Songkran in 2025

In southeast Asia sand pagodas are created in order to build Buddhist merit The tradition has been going on since the 1500s.

== Play ==
One of the main attractions of a sandy beach, especially for children, is playing with the sand; it presents more possibilities than an ordinary sandbox. One can make a mountain, a pit (encountering clay or the water table), canals, tunnels, bridges, a sculpture (representing a person, animal, etc., like a statue, or a scale model of a building), amongst many other things.

Burying someone up to their neck

Burying someone up to their neck in sand or burying oneself in such a manner is another popular beach activity.

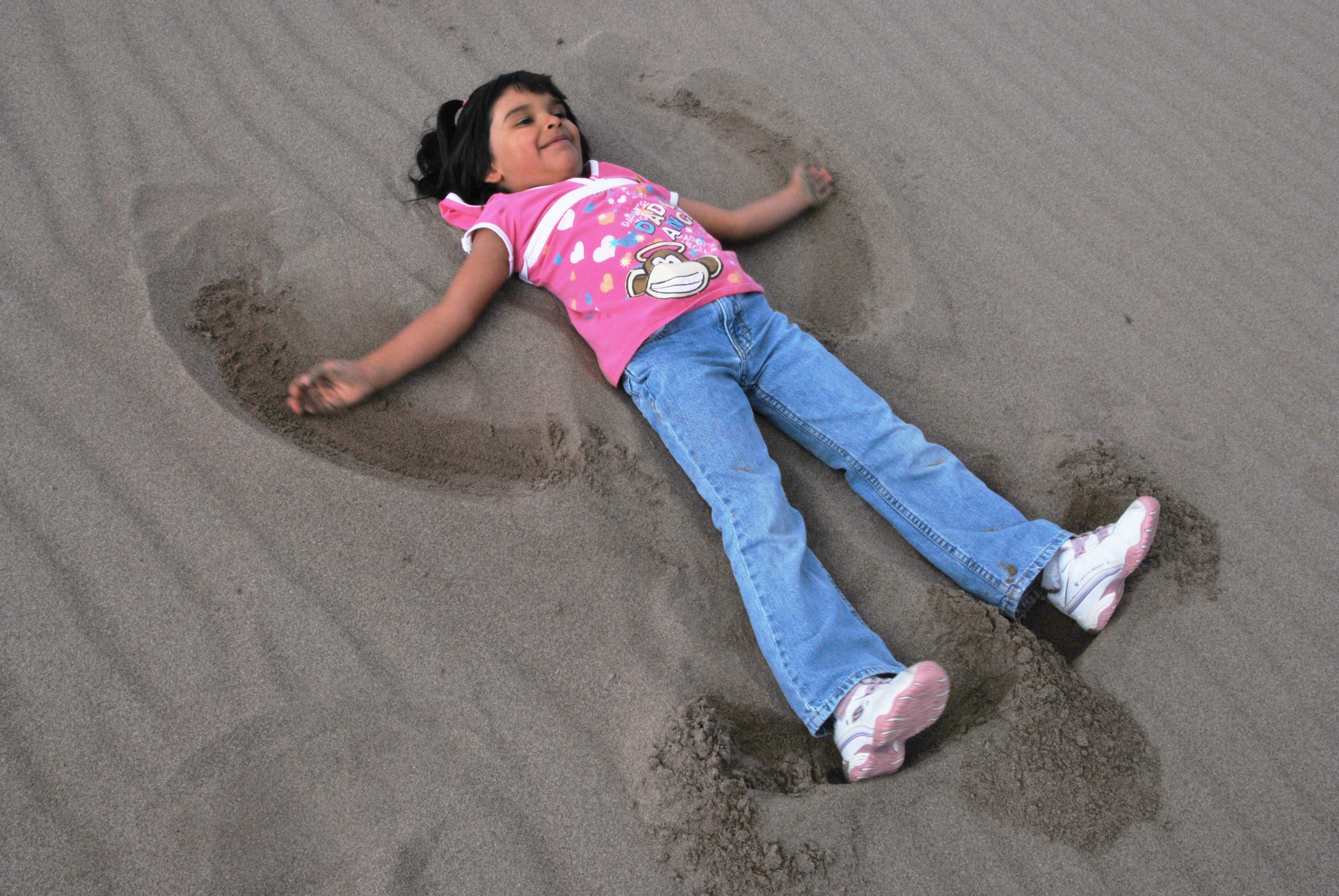
Making a sand angel

Sand angels are made in the same manner as snow angels; a person lies on their back in the sand, extending their arms and legs and swishes them back and forth.

A popular game is building a heap of sand, as high as possible, to withstand the upcoming tide.

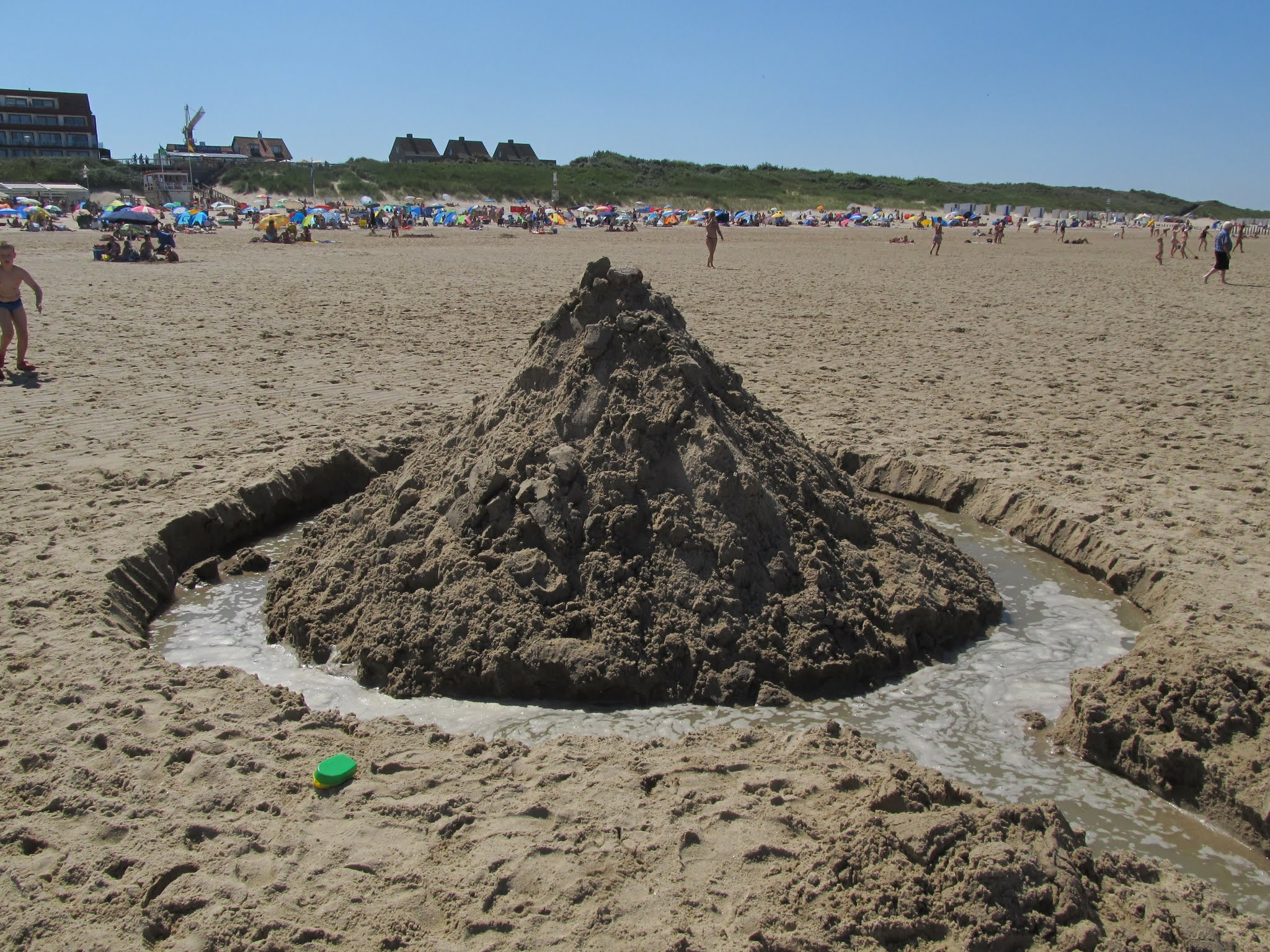
A sandcastle with a moat, at low tide

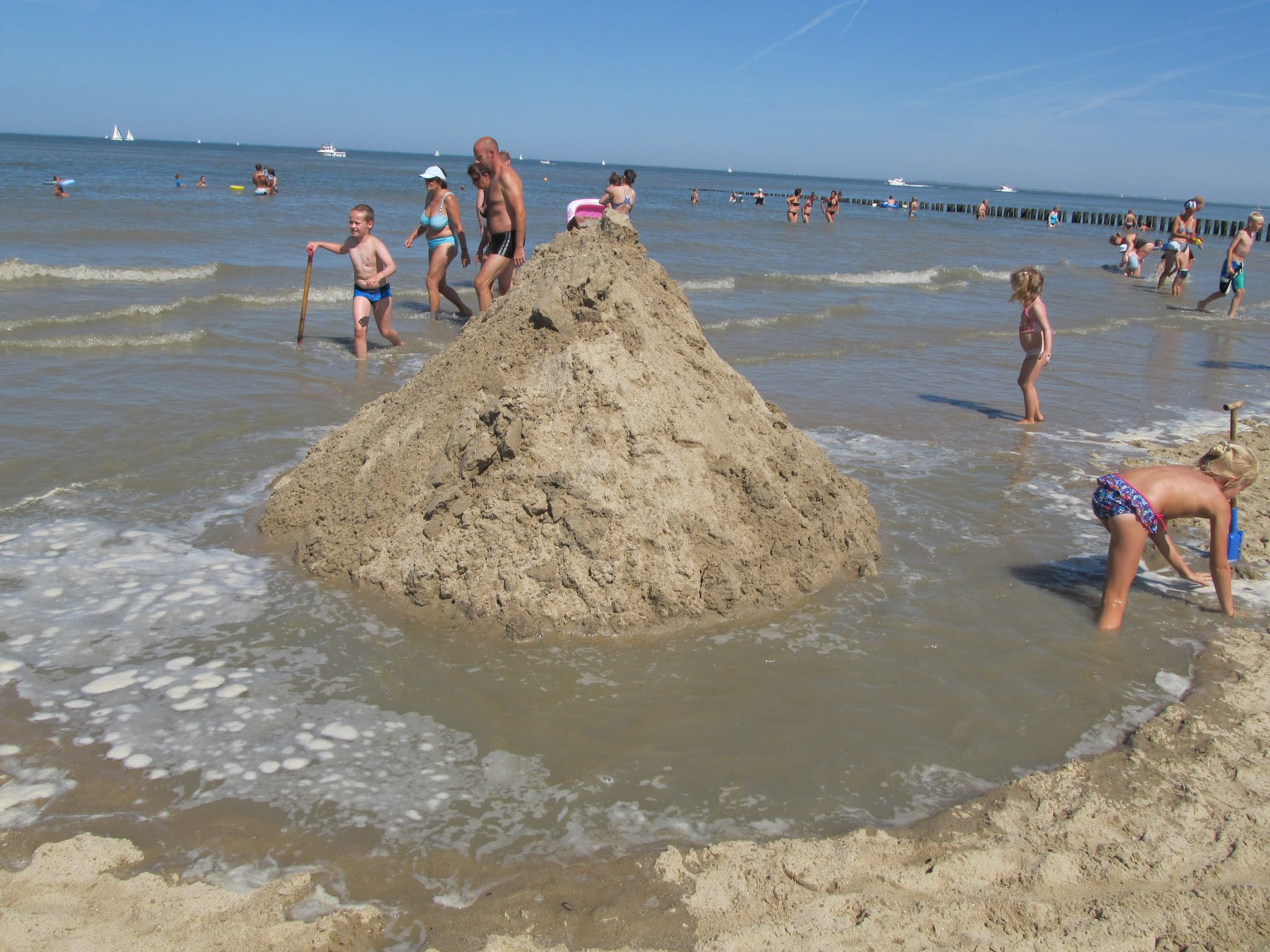
The sea moving in to surround the castle

== Sand art ==
=== Sand raking and beach murals ===
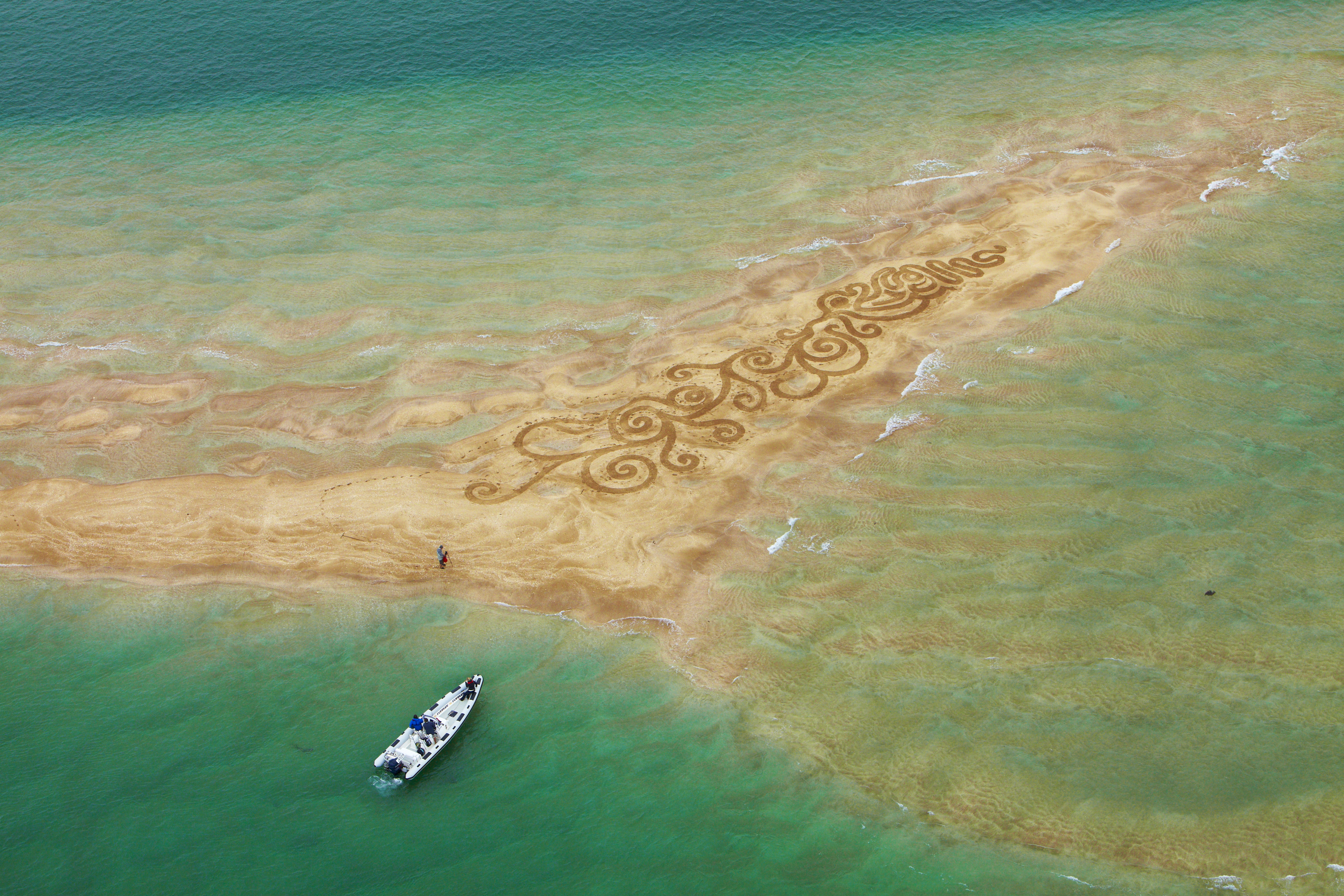
Rake art on a sandbar

Sand raking is performed on a sandy beach where the artist creates patterns by raking the sand. The resulting light-and-dark contrast is caused by differences in light reflection: smooth surfaces reflect light more directly, while raked sand scatters light, making it appear darker. Usually the designs are quite large and are similar to man-made art crop circles. The designs are ephemeral, and wash away with the next tide. Some notable artists working in this medium include Andres Amador, Sean Corcoran and Marc Treanor.

=== Moving sand art ===
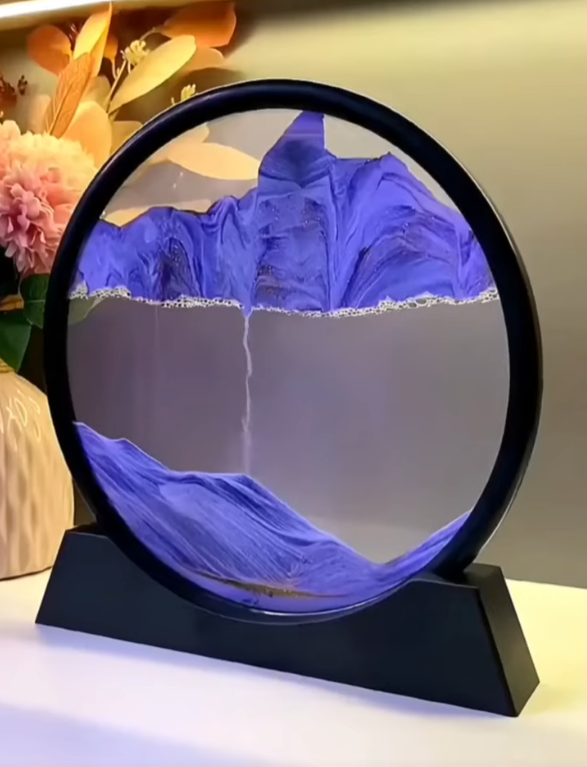
Moving Sand Art

Multiple colors of sand can be suspended in water between two sheets of glass. Unlike sand paintings, a sand glass is meant to be turned; the sand, traditionally in black and a light color, moves into new shapes with each turn. Unlike sand paintings, which are a traditional craft, these are found around the world in many colors and sizes.

=== Others ===
- Sandpainting is the art of pouring colored sands and other pigments onto a surface to make a painting.
- Sand bottles are created by pouring colored sands into a bottle to make a scene.
- Sand drawing is the creation of a drawing by scratching it out in a flat base of sand.
- Sand animation is the making of animation by manipulating sand to build figures, textures and movement, frame by frame.
