= Marc Treanor =

Welsh sand artist (1963–2020)

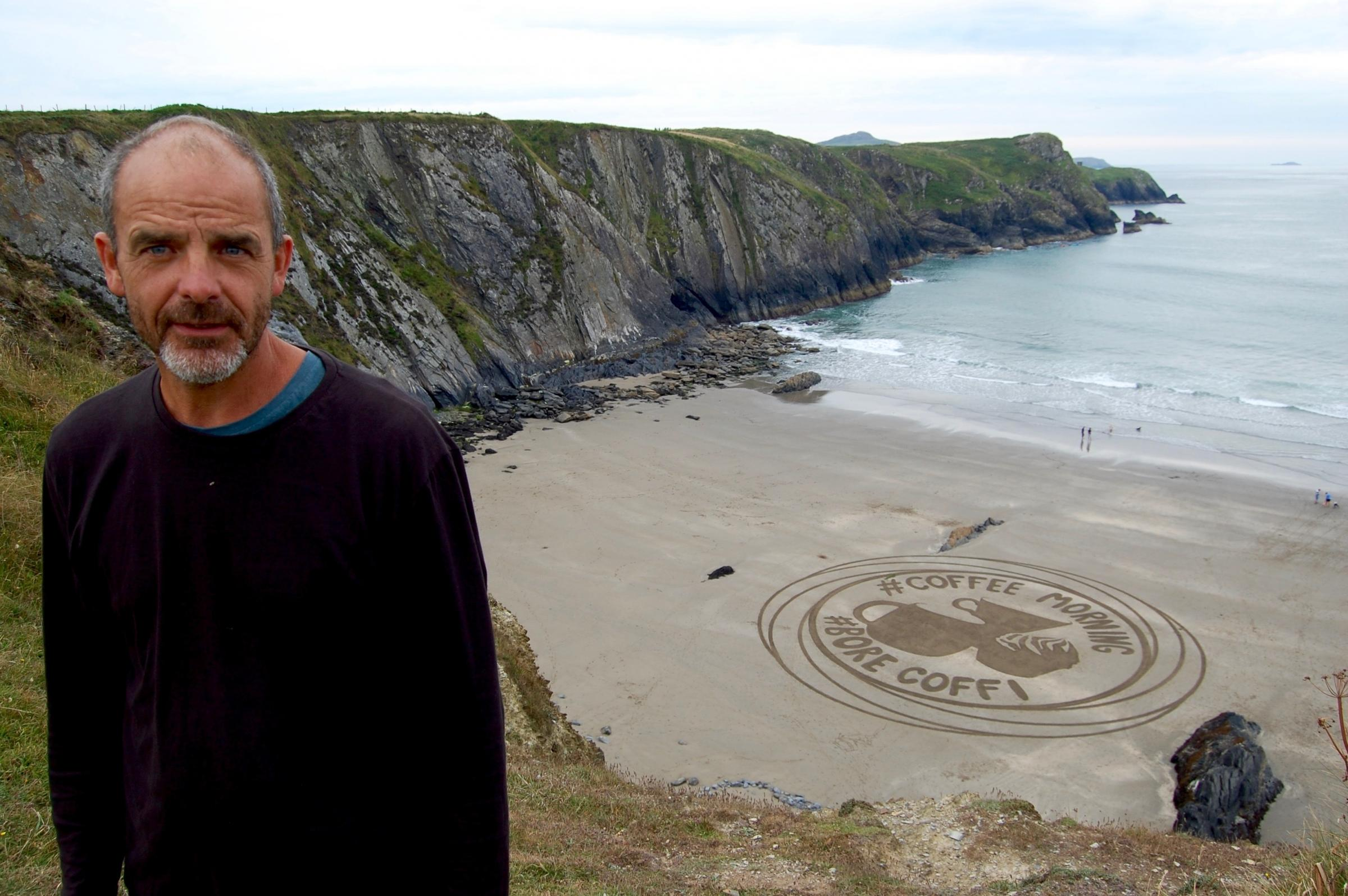
- Born: 19 June 1963
- Died: 2 July 2020 (aged 57)
- Known for: Sand murals
- Style: Geometric art
- Movement: Sand art
- Website: http://www.sandcircles.co.uk/

Marc Treanor (19 June 1963 – 2 July 2020) was a sand artist living in Dinas, Pembrokeshire. He was notable for creating intricate patterns on beaches in Cornwall and later in Pembrokeshire, Wales. Treanor was well known in the county.

== Methodology ==
Treanor produced his sand murals by sketching designs on paper before using a rake to recreate the design on a beach. The work would then remain on the beach until washed away by the tide. As a result of their innately fleeting nature and circular forms, Treanor's sand murals have been compared to crop circles.

== Personal life ==
Marc had a son and a daughter and had begun doing sand art to entertain them at the beach. This turned in to a career once he moved to Wales, working with a variety of organisations and charities throughout Wales.
