= John P. Livadary =

American sound engineer

- Born: May 20, 1896; Istanbul, Ottoman Empire
- Died: April 7, 1987 (aged 90); Newport Beach, California, United States
- Occupation: Sound engineer
- Years active: 1929–1960

John Paul Livadary (born 20 May 1896, Istanbul, Ottoman Empire, died 7 April 1987, Newport Beach, California, USA) was a sound designer.

He started work in 1928 at Columbia Pictures and won the Academy Award for Best Sound Mixing three times and was nominated another 14 times, in a career that spanned 30 years. The first Oscar was for One Night of Love (1934), the second for The Jolson Story (1946) and the third for From Here to Eternity (1953). He also won the Academy Award for Technical Achievement three times (shared twice) and the Academy Scientific and Technical Award once (shared).

== Partial filmography ==
- Broadway Scandals (1929)
- The Song of Love (1929)
- Flight (1929)
- Acquitted (1929)
- The Broadway Hoofer (1929)
- Wall Street (1929)
- Around the Corner (1930)
- Soldiers and Women (1930)
- Hell's Island (1930)
- Ladies Must Play (1930)
- Shadow Ranch (1930)
- Hurricane (1930)
- Men Without Law (1930)
- Dirigible (1931)
- One Night of Love (1934)
- Love Me Forever (1935)
- Mr. Smith Goes to Washington (1939)
- Too Many Husbands (1940)
- The Jolson Story (1946)
- The Brave Bulls (1951)
- From Here to Eternity (1953)
- The Law vs. Billy the Kid (1954)
- Pushover (1954)
- Human Desire (1954)
- The Black Dakotas (1954)
- Three Hours to Kill (1954)
- Cannibal Attack (1954)
- Phffft (1954)
- The Violent Men (1955)
- Masterson of Kansas (1955)
- The Bamboo Prison (1955)
- Ten Wanted Men (1955)
- The Long Gray Line (1955)
- Women's Prison (1955)
- Pirates of Tripoli (1955)
- Wyoming Renegades (1955)
- Three for the Show (1955)
- Cell 2455, Death Row (1955)
- Seminole Uprising (1955)
- Tight Spot (1955)
- 5 Against the House (1955)
- Bring Your Smile Along (1955)
- The Man from Laramie (1955)
- My Sister Eileen (1955)
- Count Three and Pray (1955)
- Queen Bee (1955)
- A Lawless Street (1955)
- Picnic (1955)
- The Last Frontier (1956)
- Battle Stations (1956)
- Hot Blood (1956)
- The Harder They Fall (1956)
- Jubal (1956)
- The Eddy Duchin Story (1956)
- Autumn Leaves (1956)
- He Laughed Last (1956)
- Storm Center (1956)
- The Solid Gold Cadillac (1956)
- Reprisal! (1956)
- You Can't Run Away from It (1956)
- Full of Life (1957)
- Nightfall (1957)
- The Guns of Fort Petticoat (1957)
- The Garment Jungle (1957)
- 3:10 to Yuma (1957)
- Jeanne Eagels (1957)
- The Brothers Rico (1957)
- Decision at Sundown (1957)
- Operation Mad Ball (1957)
- Pal Joey (1957)
- Going Steady (1958)
- Cowboy (1958)
- Screaming Mimi (1958)
- The Case Against Brooklyn (1958)
- The Lineup (1958)
- Life Begins at 17 (1958)
- Gunman's Walk (1958)
- Buchanan Rides Alone (1958)
- Ghost of the China Sea (1958)
- Apache Territory (1958)
- Me and the Colonel (1958)
- The Last Hurrah (1958)
- Tarawa Beachhead (1958)
- The 7th Voyage of Sinbad (1958)
- Bell, Book and Candle (1959)
- Senior Prom (1959)
- Good Day for a Hanging (1959)
- Ride Lonesome (1959)
- Gunmen from Laredo (1959)
- Forbidden Island (1959)
- Juke Box Rhythm (1959)
- Gidget (1959)
- Hey Boy! Hey Girl! (1959)
- Face of a Fugitive (1959)
- It Happened to Jane (1959)
- The 30-Foot Bride of Candy Rock (1959)
- Have Rocket, Will Travel (1959)
- The Crimson Kimono (1959)
- The Tingler (1959)
- They Came to Cordura (1959)
- Battle of the Coral Sea (1959)
- The Last Angry Man (1959)
- The Flying Fontaines (1959)
- Edge of Eternity (1959)
- 1001 Arabian Nights (1959)
- Comanche Station (1960)
- The Mountain Road (1960)
