= Dolores Dorn =

American actress (1934–2019)

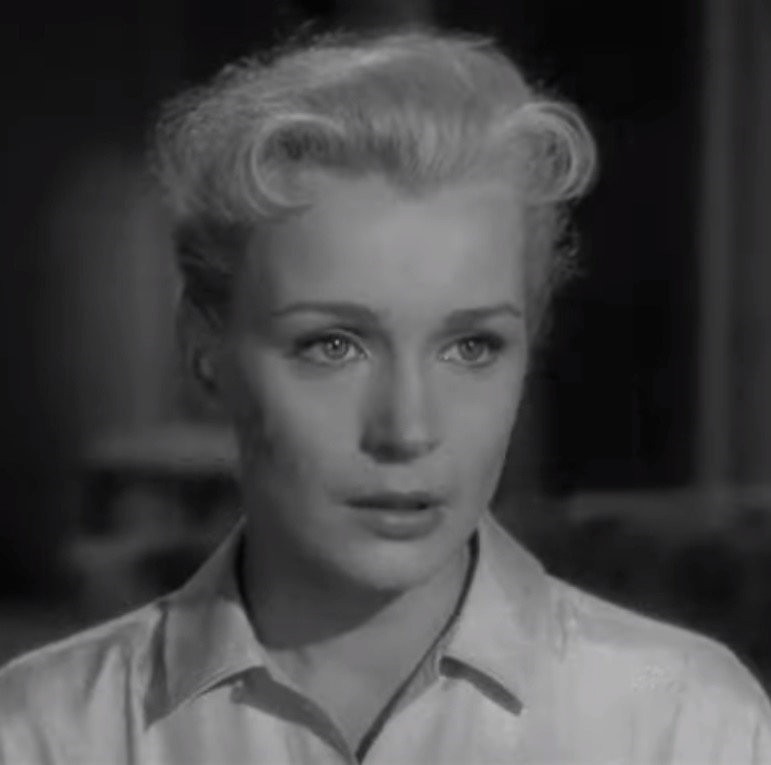
- Dorn in 13 West Street (1962)
- Born: Dolores M. Heft; March 3, 1934; Chicago, Illinois, U.S.
- Died: October 5, 2019 (aged 85)
- Other names: Dolores Dorn-Heft
- Occupation: Actress
- Years active: 1954–1980
- Spouses: Franchot Tone (m. 1956; div. 1959) Ben Piazza (m. 1967; div. 1979)

Dolores Dorn (March 3, 1934 – October 5, 2019) was an American film and television actress, who was the co-star of The Bounty Hunter (1954), Uncle Vanya (1957), Underworld U.S.A. (1961), and several other films through 1985. On Broadway, she was billed as Dolores Dorn-Heft.

== Early years ==
Dolores M. Heft was born in Chicago, the daughter of an automobile dealer. A graduate of the Goodman Art Theatre in Chicago, she finished third in the Miss Chicago contest in 1950 and second in the same contest in 1951.

== Stage ==
Before appearing in films, Dorn acted with the Shaffner Players in Illinois, Iowa, and Missouri. She appeared in Hide and Seek (1957) on Broadway and in the off-Broadway production Between Two Thieves.

== Film ==
Dorn had second billing in The Bounty Hunter, a Western starring Randolph Scott, in which her character, Julie Spencer, ends up married to Scott's. She played the wife of Alan Ladd in the actor's last Hollywood film in which he played a leading-man role, 13 West Street, and was featured as Cuddles, the moll of convict Cliff Robertson, in the crime film Underworld, U.S.A.

== Television ==
Dorn appeared in a number of made-for-TV films and as a guest star in series such as Ironside, Charlie's Angels, Simon & Simon, Run for Your Life, and The Untouchables.

=== Additional filmography ===
Film and Television
Year	Title	Role	Notes
1954	Phantom of the Rue Morgue	Camille	Film
1954	Lucky Me	Troupe Member	Film, Uncredited
1954	The Bounty Hunter	Julie Spencer	Film
1957	Uncle Vanya	Elena Andreevna	
1961	Underworld U.S.A.	Cuddles	Film
1962	13 West Street	Tracey Sherill	Film
1962	The Untouchables	Mady Collins aka Mady Kerner	TV, Episode: "The Monkey Wrench"
1973	The Candy Snatchers	Katherine	Film
1974	Truck Stop Women	Trish	Film
1977	Intimate Strangers	Dolores	TV movie
1980	Tell Me a Riddle	Vivi	Film

== Teaching ==
Dorn became an acting teacher with the American Film Institute in 1977 and later with the Lee Strasberg Institute.

== Personal life ==
Dorn was married to actors Franchot Tone (1956–1959), and Ben Piazza (1967–1979). She died on October 5, 2019, at the age of 85.

Dorn's name is featured on the Tony Award's "In Memoriam 2020" list.
