= Westbound (film) =

1959 film by Budd Boetticher

- Theatrical release poster
- Directed by: Budd Boetticher
- Screenplay by: Berne Giler
- Story by: Berne Giler; Albert S. Le Vino
- Produced by: Henry Blanke
- Starring: Randolph Scott; Virginia Mayo; Karen Steele
- Cinematography: J. Peverell Marley
- Edited by: Philip W. Anderson
- Music by: David Buttolph
- Color process: Warnercolor
- Production company: Warner Bros. Pictures
- Distributed by: Warner Bros. Pictures
- Release date: April 25, 1959
- Running time: 72 minutes
- Country: United States
- Language: English

Westbound is a 1959 American Western film directed by Budd Boetticher and starring Randolph Scott, Virginia Mayo and Karen Steele.

The film was shot in September 1958 in Warnercolor at cost of a little more than half a million dollars. The Laramie Street set at Warner Bros. Studios Burbank was used for the setting of Julesburg, Colorado. The Warner Bros. Ranch was used for other settings. David Buttolph composed the score. Westbound was released on April 25, 1959.

The film was not a part of the Ranown cycle of Westerns for which Boetticher, Scott and Harry Joe Brown partnered; Scott owed Warners one picture from an old contract, so Boetticher volunteered to direct it himself so as to protect their brand. Although Boetticher never went so far as to disown the film, he felt it was not part of the series and would only discuss it outside of that context.

Boetticher said this and Decision at Sundown were the only mediocre films of the Westerns he made with Randolph Scott.

== Plot ==
In 1864, Union army officer Captain John Hayes is asked to take charge of the Overland stagecoach line, which makes eastbound gold shipments from California that aid the Union's war effort.

Hayes travels to Overland headquarters in his hometown of Julesburg, Colorado. He meets a Union soldier, Rod Miller, who has lost an arm, and Miller's wife, Jeannie.

Clay Putnam has quit his position with Overland and is now secretly working for the Confederacy. He has the support of a quick-draw bandit, Mace, and also has married Hayes' former love, Norma.

Mace's men pick a fight with the one-armed Miller, calling him "half a man" and raising Jeannie's ire. Rod is distraught at his condition, unable to even cock a pistol now. Hayes decides to ask the Millers if they would agree to run the local Overland station out of their farm.

Mace wants to kill Hayes, but is talked out of it by Putnam, who fears the Union's response. He orders Mace's men to destroy Overland's stations and property instead and steal its deliveries of gold.

Putnam is jealous of Hayes, though, believing Norma is still interested in him. He orders his men to avoid bloodshed. But one of his men decides to try and kill Hayes, and mistakes Rod for Hayes and shoots the wrong man.

Mace drives a stagecoach off a cliff, killing passengers, including women and children. A disgusted Norma decides to leave Putnam and warns she will see him hang if anything should happen to Hayes.

A final confrontation in town results in townspeople offering Hayes their help. Putnam also comes looking for Mace to stop him from killing Hayes, but is shot, whereupon Mace is killed by Hayes.

With Putnam dead, Norma leaves town to live back east. Hayes, however, appears to have a future with Jeannie.

== Cast ==
- Randolph Scott as Capt. John Hayes
- Virginia Mayo as Norma Putnam
- Karen Steele as Jeannie Miller
- Michael Dante as Rod Miller
- Andrew Duggan as Clay Putnam
- Michael Pate as Mace
- Wally Brown as Stubby
- John Daheim as Russ
- Walter Barnes as Willis - Stage Depot Cook
- Walter Reed as Julesburg Doctor

== Reception ==
Critical reaction was subdued despite the presence of Scott and Boetticher, with the two collaborating on a cycle that has received favorable criticism in recent years. An article in American Cowboy in 2004 called Westbound "a forgotten potboiler that Boetticher directed simply to keep the collaboration going." The Scarecrow Video Movie Guide in 2004 called this "a contractual obligation Boetticher directed out of friendship" and "otherwise forgettable." A book, Stagecoach to Tombstone, describes the favorable elements: " ... only the presence of Karen Steele at her most tomboyish as Jeannie…and a vicious turn by B-movie hardman Michael Pate as hired gun Mace, are of note."

== Home media ==
Warner Home Video released the film on DVD in June 2009 via the Warner Archive Collection.

== See also ==
- List of American films of 1959

== Bibliography ==
- Hughes, Howard. Stagecoach to Tombstone: the Filmgoers' Guide to the Great Westerns. I.B. Tauris, 2008, p. 110.
- Nott, Robert. Last of the Cowboy Heroes: the Westerns of Randolph Scott, Joel McCrea, and Audie Murphy. Jefferson, N.C. : McFarland, 2000, pages 136–137.
- Scarecrow Video Movie Guide. Sasquatch Books, 2004, page 24.
- Teachout, Terry. “What Randolph Scott Knew” in American Cowboy September–October 2004, page 24.
