= Joseph F. Dinneen =

American historian

Joseph Francis Dinneen (1897–1964) was a crime reporter for The Boston Globe. He wrote several books and articles, many of which were adapted for film.

== Books ==
- Yankee Fighter: The Story of an American in the Free French Foreign Legion (1943), co-authored with John F. "Jack" Hasey
- The Purple Shamrock (1949), a biography of James Michael Curley
- Underworld U.S.A (1956), the story of a growth of a criminal empire
- Ward Eight (1936)
- The Anatomy of a Crime (1954), early book on Great Brink's robbery
- The Great Brinks Holdup (1961), co-authored with Sid Feder

== Films ==
- Six Bridges to Cross (story "They Stole $25,000,000 - And Got Away with It")
- Let Us Live (story "Murder in Massachusetts")
- Underworld U.S.A.
