= Bounty hunter (disambiguation) =

A bounty hunter is an individual who seeks out fugitives for a monetary reward.

Bounty hunter(s) may also refer to:

== Film ==
- Bounty Hunters (1996 film), a Canadian–American action film starring Michael Dudikoff
- Bounty Hunters (2016 film), a Chinese–Hong Kong–South Korean action film
- The Bounty Hunter (1954 film), an American Western film starring Randolph Scott
- The Bounty Hunter (1989 film), an American thriller film starring and directed by Robert Ginty
- The Bounty Hunter (2010 film), an American comedy film starring Gerard Butler and Jennifer Aniston

== Television ==
=== Episodes ===
- "Bounty Hunter", Daisy Does America episode 1 (2005)
- "Bounty Hunter", Dead Man's Gun season 1, episode 7 (1997)
- "Bounty Hunter", Due South season 3, episode 6 (1997)
- "Bounty Hunter", In the Heat of the Night season 4, episode 12 (1990)
- "Bounty Hunter", Katts and Dog season 5, episode 16 (1992)
- "Bounty Hunter", Land's End episode 8 (1995)
- "Bounty Hunter", Red Shoe Diaries season 1, episode 10 (1993)
- "Bounty Hunter", Run, Joe, Run season 1, episode 1 (1974)
- "Bounty Hunter", Starsky & Hutch season 1, episode 22 (1976)
- "Bounty Hunter", The Adventures of Jim Bowie season 1, episode 37 (1957)
- "Bounty Hunter", The Chinese Detective series 2, episode 5 (1982)
- "Bounty Hunter", The Daltons (2010) season 2, episode 99 (2016)
- "Bounty Hunters", American Justice season 5, episode 7 (1996)
- "Bounty Hunters", Beavis and Butt-Head season 8, episode 16 (2011)
- "Bounty Hunters", Jayce and the Wheeled Warriors episode 24 (1985)
- "Bounty Hunters!", Psych season 2, episode 9 (2007)
- "Bounty Hunters", Sky King season 4, episode 9 (1959)
- "Bounty Hunters", Star Wars: The Clone Wars season 2, episode 17 (2010)
- "Bounty Hunters", Wild West Tech season 3, episode 5 (2005)
- "The Bounty Hunter", 26 Men season 2, episode 26 (1958)
- "The Bounty Hunter", Alias Smith and Jones season 2, episode 12 (1971)
- "The Bounty Hunter", Barnaby Jones season 5, episode 8 (1976)
- "The Bounty Hunter", Black Sash episode 8 (2003)
- "The Bounty Hunter", Bordertown (1989) season 1, episode 19 (1989)
- "The Bounty Hunter", BraveStarr episode 37 (2010)
- "The Bounty Hunter", Cagney & Lacey season 3, episode 4 (1984)
- "The Bounty Hunter", Code Name: Eternity episode 10 (2000)
- "The Bounty Hunter", Gunsmoke season 11, episode 7 (1965)
- "The Bounty Hunter", K9 series 4 (2010)
- "The Bounty Hunter", Land of the Giants season 1, episode 15 (1969)
- "The Bounty Hunter", Lassie (1954) season 6, episode 11 (1959)
- "The Bounty Hunter", Minder series 1, episode 5 (1979)
- "The Bounty Hunter", My Dad the Bounty Hunter season 1, episode 1 (2023)
- "The Bounty Hunter", My Name Is Earl season 1, episode 21 (2006)
- "The Bounty Hunter", SilverHawks episode 22 (1986)
- "The Bounty Hunter", Sue Thomas: F.B.Eye season 3, episode 15 (2005)
- "The Bounty Hunter", Tales of Wells Fargo season 3, episode 38 (1959)
- "The Bounty Hunter", Tate episode 3 (1960)
- "The Bounty Hunter", The Lone Ranger season 4, episode 37 (1955)
- "The Bounty Hunter", The Marshal season 1, episode 7 (1997)
- "The Bounty Hunter", Trackdown season 1, episode 21 (1958)
- "The Bounty Hunters", Broken Arrow season 2, episode 9 (1957)
- "The Bounty Hunters", Fury season 3, episode 20 (1958)
- "The Bounty Hunters", My Dad the Bounty Hunter season 1, episode 10 (2023)
- "The Bounty Hunters", The Sparticle Mystery series 3, episode 2 (2015)
- "The Bounty Hunters", Zorro (1990) season 1, episode 21 (1990)

=== Shows ===
- Dog the Bounty Hunter, a reality television show
- Bounty Hunters (American TV series), an American animated television series
- Bounty Hunters (British TV series), a British comedy-drama series

== Gaming ==
- Mace Griffin: Bounty Hunter, a 2003 first person shooter on the PlayStation 2, Xbox, and PC
- Star Wars: Bounty Hunter, a 2002 Star Wars video game developed and published by LucasArts
- A former activity in the MMORPG RuneScape

== Other uses ==
East Side Bounty Hunter Watts Bloods, a Blood gang in Watts, Los Angeles.

- Bounty Hunter (truck), a monster truck currently racing in the USHRA Monster Jam series
- Star Wars: The Bounty Hunters, a series of four one-shot comics
- "Bounty Hunter," a song by Southern rock band Molly Hatchet
- VFA-2 "Bounty Hunters", a United States Navy squadron
