= The Bounty Hunter (1954 film) =

1954 film by André de Toth

- Promotional film poster
- Directed by: Andre DeToth
- Written by: Winston Miller; Finlay McDermid
- Produced by: Samuel Bischoff
- Starring: Randolph Scott; Marie Windsor; Dolores Dorn
- Cinematography: Edwin B. DuPar
- Edited by: Clarence Kolster
- Music by: David Buttolph
- Production company: Transcona Enterprises Productions
- Distributed by: Warner Bros. Pictures
- Release date: September 22, 1954
- Running time: 79 minutes
- Country: United States
- Language: English

The Bounty Hunter is a 1954 American Western film directed by Andre DeToth and starring Randolph Scott, Marie Windsor and Dolores Dorn. It was the last of six Randolph Scott westerns with DeToth and the first film to feature a bounty hunter as its hero. It was released by Warner Bros. Pictures. It was filmed in 3D but released in standard format, though a 3D print exists in the Warner archives. Stock footage from the 1952 film Carson City is used at the beginning of the film. Portions of the film were shot on location in California at Red Rock Canyon and the Mojave Desert.

== Plot ==
A prologue explains the role of the bounty hunter. A wanted criminal named Burch tries to ambush bounty hunter Jim Kipp, but Kipp gets the better of him. Kipp takes Burch's corpse into town to collect the reward. A representative of the Pinkerton Detective Agency asks Kipp to hunt a trio of fugitives. Three masked men committed a robbery and murders and fled with $100,000 in cash. Kipp, who has the reputation that he will do anything for money, is offered a reward of $5,000.00 if he can reclaim the stolen money and capture the culprits dead or alive.

Kipp rides into the town of Twin Forks, where he uses an alias as he seeks information about one fugitive's wounds from Dr. Spencer, who treated the fugitive but is wary of revealing too much. Kipp is immediately attracted to the doctor's daughter, Julie. A limping man named Bill Rachin, who works at the hotel, draws Kipp's suspicion. So does George Williams, a card dealer. Williams's wife, Alice, flirts with Kipp and tries to coax information out of him. Kipp does not reveal the purpose of his visit.

Vance Edwards identifies Kipp, and, knowing Kipp is a bounty hunter, mistakenly believes Kipp is seeking him for a crime Edwards committed when he was young. The townspeople become anxious as the truth about Kipp becomes known. Led by the postmaster, Danvers, they offer Kipp a bribe to leave town. Kipp tells several people that he is expecting a package on the next day's stagecoach that will include a photograph of one of the robbers. Dr. Spencer later overhears Kipp telling his daughter the same thing and he becomes worried.

Spencer confronts Williams, whom he knows to be associated with the robbers, and demands a meeting with them. Williams tells Spencer the three are playing poker and agrees to take him to their game but shoots Spencer instead. Hearing the shot, Kipp pursues and corners Williams. He tries to force Williams to tell what he knows about the robbery, but Sheriff Brand shoots Williams dead just as Williams was about to reveal information about the robbery. Meanwhile, Spencer, gravely wounded, has been taken back to his house. There, Danvers secretly tries to smother him with a pillow, but he is discovered by Julie. Kipp hears Julie's screams and rushes to her; Danvers flees. Kipp follows Danvers as he hastily leaves town and stops when he loses sight of Danvers but hears someone digging in the hills. He then hears a shot and finds Danvers dead next to an empty money box.

Kipp now knows Danvers was one of the three robbers. The next day the stage arrives with the mail. The sheriff deputizes Rachin and plans to get rid of the bounty hunter. Edwards rescues Kipp, grateful that the bounty hunter is not after him. Kipp opens one of the letters in the mail pouch and looks at the contents, then looks at the sheriff and says, “Your likeness.” The sheriff reveals himself as one of the robbers when he pulls a gun on Kipp, but Alice Williams kills him. She explains that Brand deserved it for shooting her husband. Julie, who had been watching, struggles with Alice for her gun and Kipp subdues Alice. Kipp realizes that Alice is the third robber. He searches her saddle bag and finds the stolen money. Kipp decides to settle in Twin Forks. He marries Julie, and becomes the new town sheriff.

== Cast ==
- Randolph Scott as Jim Kipp
- Dolores Dorn as Julie Spencer
- Marie Windsor as Alice Williams
- Howard Petrie as Sheriff Brand
- Harry Antrim as Dr. Spencer
- Robert Keys as George Williams
- Tyler MacDuff as Vance
- Ernest Borgnine as Rachin
- Dub Taylor as Danvers
- Fess Parker as the young cowboy who rides into and back out of town in the ending scene.(uncredited)
- Mickey Simpson 1 scene--he is hassling Alice in The Palace Saloon.(uncredited)
- Archie R. Twitchell as Harrison

Blonde Delores Dorn fights brunette Marie Windsor in this Italian poster for the film.

== Production notes ==
Critics responded favorably to DeToth's skills as a director, especially his ability to seamlessly integrate 3D effects into the picture as well as for his long tracking shots filmed on location. Unlike other films of the early 50s that were shot in color, The Bounty Hunter's color photography still shows well to more modern audiences.

Winston Miller's screenplay included notable dialogue such as Kipp explaining that one reason he was a bounty hunter rather than a lawman was that he could enforce the law but didn't have to "to break up fights or throw drunks in jail." When asked by the town sheriff why he became a bounty hunter, Kipp counts his cash reward, replying, "I'm counting the reasons." Another scene features Julie, whose father is a doctor, criticizing Kipp's gun in comparison to her father's medical instruments, saying it's not a "stethoscope", causing Kipp to caustically remark, "No, but properly used it can be very good for the human race."

Near the movie's conclusion, Julie and Alice fight over a gun. Although much of the fight was omitted from the film's final edit, pre-release publicity promoted it as a fight where "blonde Dolores Dorn and brunette Marie Windsor stage their own hair-pulling, scratching, swinging scrimmage." DeToth allegedly filmed the scene in one take, without a rehearsal, and encouraged the women to actually fight each other. At the end of the fight, both women were covered with dirt and perspiration. One reviewer noted that the studio described it as one of the most "fiercely fought" fights between two women ever filmed.

Contemporary critics have pointed out that Kipp's marriage to Julie, played by Dolores Dorn, who was 36 years his junior, seems unusual to current movie audiences. The Bounty Hunter was Dorn's screen debut.
