= Buchanan Rides Alone =

1958 film by Budd Boetticher

- Theatrical release poster
- Directed by: Budd Boetticher
- Screenplay by: Charles Lang; Burt Kennedy (uncredited)
- Based on: The Name's Buchanan; 1956 novel by Jonas Ward
- Produced by: Harry Joe Brown
- Starring: Randolph Scott; Craig Stevens; Barry Kelley
- Cinematography: Lucien Ballard
- Edited by: Al Clark
- Color process: Columbia Color
- Production companies: Producers-Actors Corporation; Scott-Brown Productions
- Distributed by: Columbia Pictures
- Release date: August 6, 1958 (USA)
- Running time: 80 minutes
- Country: United States
- Language: English

Buchanan Rides Alone is a 1958 American Western film directed by Budd Boetticher and starring Randolph Scott, Craig Stevens, and Barry Kelley. Based on the 1956 novel The Name's Buchanan by Jonas Ward (in this case, Willam Ard), the film is about a Texan returning home with enough money to start his own ranch. When he stops in the crooked town of Agry, he is robbed and framed for murder.

== Plot ==
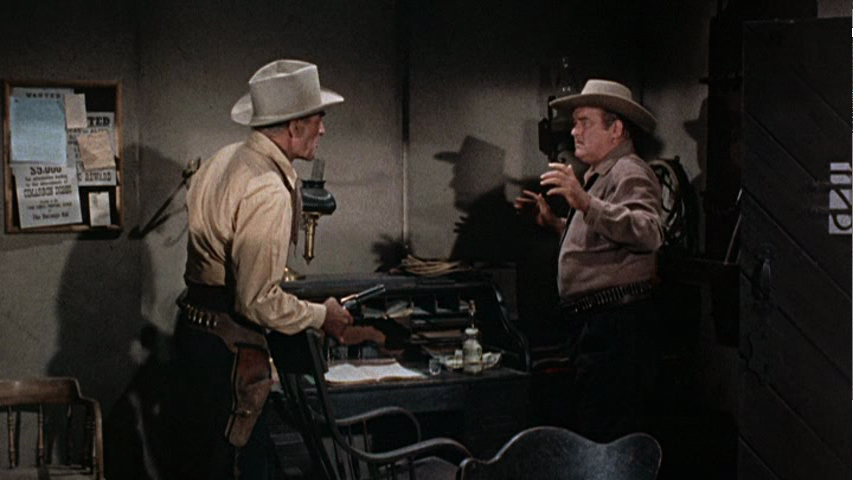
Buchanan (Randolph Scott) confronts corrupt Sheriff Lew Agry (Barry Kelley)

While returning to West Texas from Mexico, Tom Buchanan rides into the California border town of Agry and becomes embroiled in an internecine feud involving the powerful Agry clan.

In self-defense, Tom punches young Roy Agry, a drunken hothead who then declares he is going to kill Tom. However, a young vaquero, Juan de la Vega, rides in and kills Roy Agry. Juan reveals to Tom later that he did this because Agry had assaulted his sister.

Tom intervenes in the scuffle surrounding Juan's arrest and is also arrested. It then becomes the set narrative that the two men worked together to plan the killing of Roy Agry.

A lynching is arranged, but the judge, Simon Agry (Roy's father), interrupts and makes a show of being determined to conduct a trial in a decent, proper manner. In truth, Agry is conspiring to extort Juan's wealthy family for his release.

A trial is held, and Tom is acquitted. Juan, who puts up no defense, is found guilty and sentenced to hang. Tom tries to secure the young man's release but is pressured to leave town by Sheriff Lew Agry who keeps Tom's $2,000. Tom vows to return to retrieve it. The sheriff directs two of his men to escort Tom well away from the town ostensibly, but they have been ordered to kill him instead. The plan is foiled when one of them, Pecos Hill, who comes from the same area of Texas as Tom and feels a kinship with him, kills his colleague. Pecos accepts Tom's offer of a partnership in his Texas ranch, and the two decide to rest a while at an abandoned shack before Tom heads to town to get his money back.

Meanwhile, Juan's father sends a representative, Gomez, to win Juan's release with a generous offer of thirty world-class horses. Simon declines, instead demanding $50,000 cash. Another Agry, Amos, overhears this deal being made and tells Lew, who immediately concocts a plan to have the money for himself. He arranges for Juan to be transported to the shack Tom and Pecos are occupying. Tom manages to surprise the sheriff's goons and tie them up.

Tom instructs Pecos to accompany Juan to the border while he returns to Agry to recover his money. The sheriff's men manage to free themselves, catch up with and kill Pecos while re-capturing Juan.

Gomez returns to Simon's house with the ransom money, and the judge sends his enforcer, Carbo, to get Juan from jail. But the cell is empty, and the sheriff informs Carbo that it is he with whom Gomez needs to deal.

Tom, meantime, has returned to town and, at gunpoint, forces Lew to get his money out of the safe. As he is readying to leave, the sheriff's men return with Juan. Once again Juan and Tom are thrown into a cell together.

The townspeople are tired of waiting for the hanging, and tensions rise. Simon goes to town, finds Gomez with Lew, and instructs Carbo to walk Gomez to the jail to retrieve Juan. A gunfight breaks out, the saddlebags containing the $50,000 are dropped in the street, and the ensuing stand-off results in the judge and the sheriff shooting each other, committing mutual fratricide.

In the end, gunfighter Carbo inherits the town. Juan is freed, the ransom money is returned to the de la Vega family, and Tom resumes his journey to Texas.

== Cast ==
- Randolph Scott as Tom Buchanan
- Craig Stevens as Abe Carbo
- Barry Kelley as Sheriff Lew Agry
- Tol Avery as Judge Simon Agry
- Peter Whitney as Amos Agry
- Manuel Rojas as Juan De La Vega
- L. Q. Jones as "Pecos" Hill
- Robert Anderson as Waldo Peck
- Joe De Santis as Esteban Gomez
- William Leslie as Roy Agry
- Jennifer Holden as K.T.
- Nacho Galindo as "Nacho"

== Production ==
Although the screenplay is credited to Charles Lang, his script was deemed unsuitable, so Boetticher asked his regular writer, Burt Kennedy, to rewrite the script. Because Lang's wife was gravely ill and he needed the money, Kennedy allowed him to take the salary and screen credit. In a 2001 interview at the Cinecon Film Festival, Boetticher confirmed that the script was Kennedy's work, noting that such lines as "This sure is a $10 town" and "Don't just stand there, Amos, get a shovel!" could only have been written by him.

A number of music score stock cues used in the production are the same as those used in the 1958–1961 TV series Sea Hunt, with stock music credits to Mischa Bakaleinikoff, George Duning, Heinz Roemheld, and Paul Sawtell.

Filmed at Old Tucson Studios Arizona

== Home media ==
In 2008 a DVD box set of five Budd Boetticher films starring Randolph Scott was released. Along with Buchanan Rides Alone the set includes Comanche Station, Decision at Sundown, Ride Lonesome, and The Tall T. In 2021, Mill Creek Entertainment released a Blu-ray box set of 12 Randolph Scott films including Buchanan Rides Alone and the other Budd Boetticher/Randolph Scott films.

== See also ==
- List of American films of 1958
