= Underworld U.S.A. =

1961 film by Samuel Fuller

- Theatrical release poster
- Directed by: Samuel Fuller
- Screenplay by: Samuel Fuller
- Based on: articles in The Saturday Evening Post; 1956 by Joseph F. Dinneen
- Produced by: Samuel Fuller
- Starring: Cliff Robertson; Dolores Dorn; Beatrice Kay; Richard Rust
- Cinematography: Hal Mohr
- Edited by: Jerome Thoms
- Music by: Harry Sukman
- Color process: Black and white
- Production company: Globe Enterprises
- Distributed by: Columbia Pictures
- Release date: March 1961
- Running time: 98 minutes
- Country: United States
- Language: English
- Budget: $1 million

Underworld U.S.A. (also known as Underworld USA) is a 1961 American neo-noir crime film produced, written, and directed by Samuel Fuller. It tells the story of a 14-year-old boy who goes to enormous lengths to get revenge against the mobsters who beat his father to death. It stars Cliff Robertson, Dolores Dorn, and Beatrice Kay.

== Plot ==
The 14-year-old Tolly Devlin and his mother figure (Beatrice Kay) see four hoods beat his father to death. Tolly vows to avenge his father, but he discovers that Farrar, the one perpetrator he recognized when his father was being beaten, has been arrested and imprisoned for life. Tolly becomes a petty criminal and safecracker. Many years later, during a stint in prison, Tolly discovers that Farrar is on his deathbed in the prison medical ward. Tolly manipulates his way into the room and tricks Farrar into revealing the names of the other three killers before he dies.

The remaining killers have risen to be powerful lieutenants in the crime syndicate, so Tolly works his way into their organization. In the process, he saves and then begins a romance with a low-level syndicate money-runner named Cuddles (Dolores Dorn). Becoming a secret informant for the police, Tolly ends up playing both sides in his cagey campaign to bring down the remaining mobsters. Tolly's machinations convince syndicate boss Connors to have each of the three lieutenants murdered by the syndicate's ruthless assassin, Gus.

Having accomplished his goal, Tolly plans to go straight and marry Cuddles. The police warn him that without bringing down Connors, he has no chance of getting out alive, but Tolly does not believe them. As Tolly prepares to leave, Gus arrives and informs him that Connors has assigned them to kill Cuddles and several other innocent witnesses. Tolly realizes that Connors must be stopped. He knocks out Gus and turns him in to the police, and then confronts Connors and his men. Tolly kills Connors, but is shot during the struggle. He stumbles into an alley and dies.

== Cast ==
- Cliff Robertson as Tolly Devlin
- Dolores Dorn as Cuddles
- Beatrice Kay as Sandy
- Paul Dubov as Gela
- Robert Emhardt as Earl Connors
- Larry Gates as John Driscoll
- Richard Rust as Gus Cottahee
- Gerald Milton as Gunther
- Allan Gruener as Smith

== Production ==
Producer Ray Stark asked Fuller to write and direct a film based on the title of a magazine article written by Joseph F. Dinneen. Fuller also was inspired by a book, Here Is to Crime, by newspaperman Riley Cooper.

An opening scene with a Union of Prostitutes was deleted by Sam Briskin and other Columbia executives. Fuller's character Tolly is a loner motivated by revenge using the United States government and his own devices to even the score. Fuller heard the reaction of a real-life gangster who reportedly said, "If only my son would have that kind of affection for me!"

== Reception ==
=== Critical response ===
Film critic Dennis Schwartz liked the film, and wrote, "Samuel Fuller's revenge crime thriller is shot in the same brisk and violent manner he shoots his war films". Eddie Muller writing about this late noir: "Fuller spins this saga in the bombastic cinematic equivalent of tabloid journalism—lurid, punchy, and sensational—ideas and emotions smacking the viewer in 200-point type."

=== Legacy ===
A wanted poster of Tolly Devlin appears in a police station in Columbia's film of Sail a Crooked Ship (1961).

== Preservation ==
The Academy Film Archive preserved Underworld U.S.A. in 2000.
