= Karen Steele =

American actress and model (1931–1988)

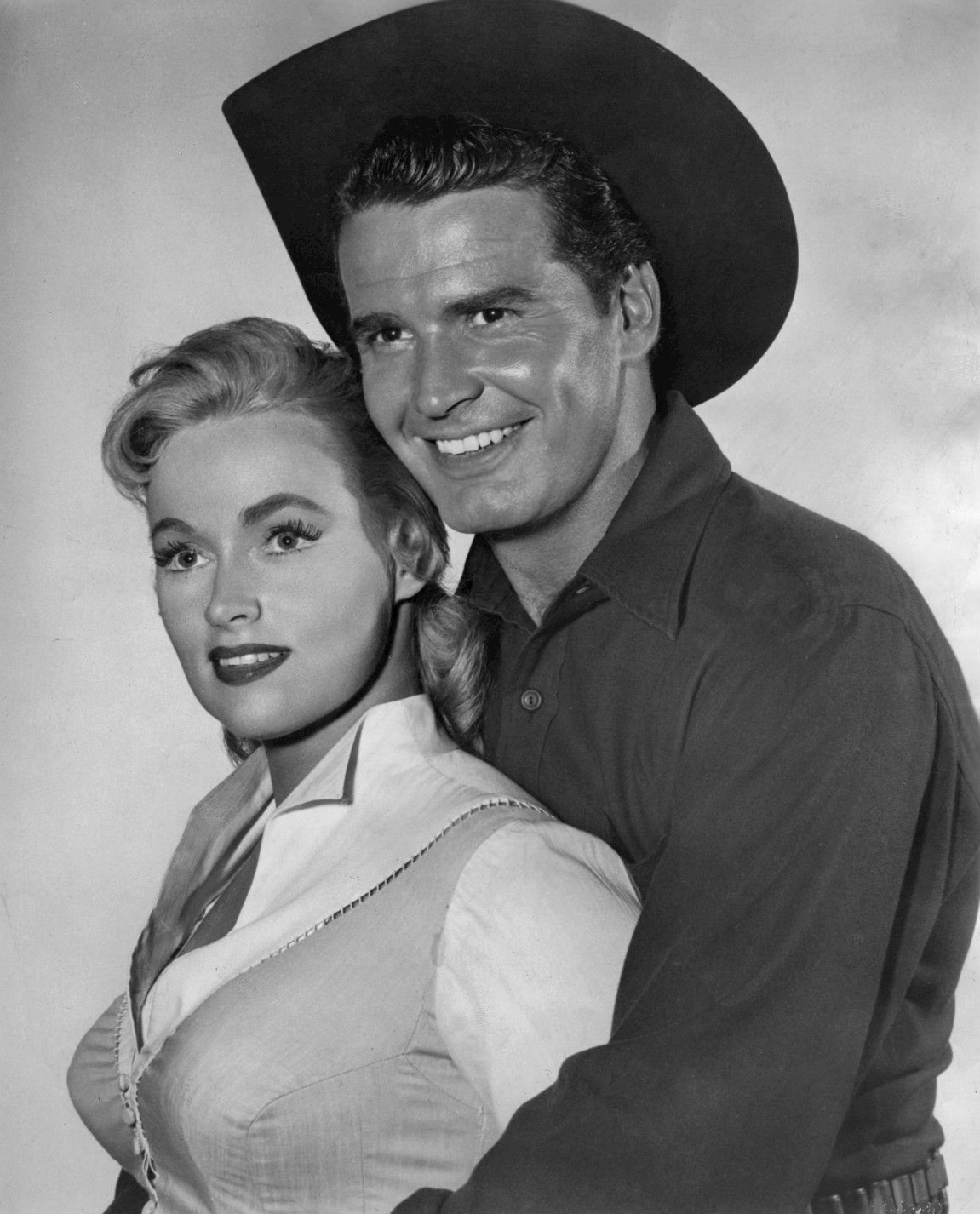
- Steele and James Garner in Maverick, 1957
- Born: March 20, 1931; Honolulu, Territory of Hawaii, U.S.
- Died: March 12, 1988 (aged 56); Kingman, Arizona, U.S.
- Years active: 1953–1972
- Spouse: Maurice Boyd Ruland (m. 1973)

Karen Steele (March 20, 1931 – March 12, 1988) was an American actress and model with more than 60 roles in film and television. Her most famous roles include starring as Virginia in Marty, as Mrs. Lane in Ride Lonesome, and as Eve McHuron in the Star Trek episode "Mudd's Women".

== Early life ==
Steele was born in Honolulu, Hawaii, to Percy Davis Steele (1897–1974), a Bostonian of English descent and a career Marine who in 1956 was named assistant administrator of the Marshall Islands. Her mother, Ruth Covey Merritt (1900–1969), was a Californian of French and Danish heritage. Steele's childhood in the Hawaiian Islands brought her into contact with the Japanese and Hawaiian languages.

When she was 13 years old, a surfing accident resulted in Steele's leg being cut by coral. She later developed osteomyelitis in the leg with infection so severe that amputation was seriously considered until a doctor brought to Hawaii from Hong Kong ended the infection. The leg had to be rebuilt with wires and metal, but after 22 operations she began rehabilitation to resume walking.

Steele attended the University of Hawaii and studied acting at Rollins College in Florida for a year. After that, she found work as a cover girl and model.

== Career ==
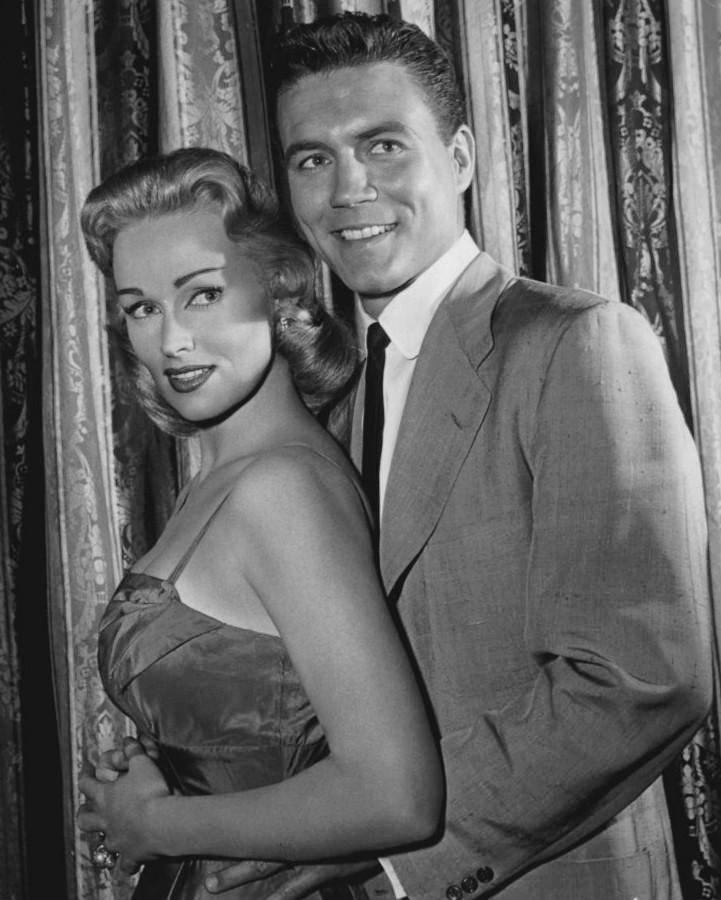
With Roger Smith in 77 Sunset Strip, 1959

Steele's first acting job was on the radio program Let George Do It. She subsequently appeared in the films The Clown (in an uncredited role, 1953) and Man Crazy (also 1953) as Marge. The following year, she landed the role of Millie Darrow in "So False and So Fair" on the television anthology Studio 57, but a supporting role in Marty (1955) was her highest profile film role.

In 1957, she guest starred on the TV program Maverick, as Molly Gleason in the episode "Point Blank" opposite James Garner and Mike Connors. In 1958, she played the titular role in the episode "Madame Faro" of NBC's Jefferson Drum, another western series.

Steele made two guest appearances on CBS's Perry Mason, as Doris Stephanak in "The Case of the Haunted Husband" (1958) and as murder victim Carina Wileen in "The Case of the Fatal Fetish" (1965). She appeared as Mae Dailey in the 1961 episode "Big Time Blues" on the ABC/Warner Brothers drama, The Roaring 20s. Earlier, she was cast in a guest-starring role in another ABC/WB series, The Alaskans starring Roger Moore.

In 1962, she portrayed the part of Dolly LeMoyne in the episode "The Woman Trap" on CBS's Rawhide starring Clint Eastwood. Her character in "Survival of the Fattest", a 1965 episode of NBC's Get Smart, was named Mary 'Jack' Armstrong, said to be "the strongest female enemy agent in the world". This is a reference to Jack Armstrong, the clean-cut fictional hero of Jack Armstrong the All American Boy, an adventure series broadcast on radio from 1933 to 1951. She appeared in an early episode of Star Trek ("Mudd's Women", 1966). Like many actresses, later in her career she turned to television commercials for income. She also became involved in charitable causes and community service. In early 1970, she went on a handshake tour of service hospitals in the South Pacific, rather than accept a series that would have paid her $78,000. As a result, she lost her agent.

== Personal life ==
In later life, she settled in Golden Valley, Arizona, and married Dr. Maurice Boyd Ruland, a psychiatrist at the Mohave Mental Health Clinic. They were married until her death from cancer at age 56 at the Kingman Regional Medical Center in Kingman, Arizona.

== Filmography ==
=== Film ===
- The Clown (1953) as Blonde (uncredited)
- Man Crazy (1953) as Marge
- Marty (1955) as Virginia
- Toward the Unknown (1956) as Polly Craven
- The Sharkfighters (1956) as Martha Staves
- Bailout at 43,000 (1957) as Carol Peterson
- Decision at Sundown (1957) as Lucy Summerton
- Ride Lonesome (1959) as Mrs. Carrie Lane
- Westbound (1959) as Jeanie Miller (Rod's wife)
- The Rise and Fall of Legs Diamond (1960) as Alice Schiffer-Diamond
- 40 Pounds of Trouble (1962) as Bambi
- McGhee (1965, TV Movie) as Ann Dorsey
- Cyborg 2087 (1966) as Dr. Sharon Mason
- Death of a Salesman (1966, TV Movie) as Letta
- Braddock (1968, TV Movie) as Louise Tratner
- A Boy... a Girl (1969) as Elizabeth
- The Happy Ending (1969) as Divorcee
- The Trap on Cougar Mountain (1972) (final film role)

=== Television ===
- Studio 57 – Millie Darrow (1 episode, 1954)
- Hallmark Hall of Fame – Nurse (1 episode, 1955)
- Medic (1 episode, 1955)
- Stage 7 – Mary (1 episode, 1955)
- Climax! – Gloria / Lee Rogers (2 episodes, 1955–1957)
- The Ford Television Theatre – Lorraine (1 episode, 1956)
- Dragnet (1 episode, 1956)
- Lux Video Theatre (1 episode, 1956)
- The Millionaire – Rita (2 episodes, 1956–1958)
- Conflict (1 episode, 1957)
- Wagon Train – Sarah Dawson (1 episode, 1957)
- Maverick – Molly Gleason / Myra (2 episodes, 1957–1959)
- Jefferson Drum – Madame Faro (1 episode, 1958) Star
- Perry Mason – Doris Stephanak / Carina Wileen (2 episodes, 1958–1965)
- Schlitz Playhouse of Stars (1 episode, 1959)
- Northwest Passage – Mary Clark (1 episode, 1959)
- Bat Masterson – Elsa Dorn (1 episode, 1959)
- Hawaiian Eye – Marian Summers (1 episode, 1959)
- 77 Sunset Strip – Candy Varga ... (3 episodes, 1959–1960)
- Bourbon Street Beat – Barbara Komack (1 episode, 1960)
- Lawman – Laura Soldano (1 episode, 1960)
- The Deputy – Julie Grant (1 episode, 1960)
- Tightrope! – Maria Braden (1 episode, 1960)
- The Alaskans – Ellen Chambers (3 episodes, 1960)
- Riverboat – Sue Parker (1 episode, 1960)
- The Roaring 20's – Mae Dailey (1 episode, 1961)
- Dante (1 episode, 1961)
- Target: The Corruptors! – Marie Kleberg (1 episode, 1961)
- Bronco – Vicky (1 episode, 1961)
- Surfside 6 – Jean Pappas / Sylvia Morton (2 episodes, 1961–1962)
- Laramie – Linda James ... (2 episodes, 1961–1962)
- Bonanza – Sylvia Ann Goshen (episode "The Tin Badge", 1961)
- Follow the Sun – Doris #2 (1 episode, 1962)
- Alcoa Premiere – Sabina (1 episode, 1962)
- Naked City – Grace Harvey (Season 3, Episode 20: "To Walk Like A Lion", aired Wed., Feb. 28, 1962)
- Rawhide – Dolly LeMoyne (1 episode, 1962)
- Empire – Kate Callahan (1 episode, 1963)
- Hazel – Rita Noll (3 episodes, 1964)
- Get Smart – Mary 'Jack' Armstrong (1 episode, 1965)
- A Man Called Shenandoah – Naomi (1 episode, 1965)
- Voyage to the Bottom of the Sea – Cara Sloane (1 episode, 1965)
- The Long, Hot Summer – Willow Sterne (2 episodes, 1965)
- Branded – Lorrie Heller (1 episode, 1965)
- Bob Hope Presents the Chrysler Theatre – Fran Perez (1 episode, 1965)
- The Wackiest Ship in the Army – Smitty (1 episode, 1965)
- The Farmer's Daughter (1 episode, 1966)
- Star Trek: The Original Series (1966) – Eve McHuron in S1:E6, "Mudd's Women"
- Flipper – Fran Whitman (2 episodes, 1967)
- The Felony Squad – Nina Barnes (2 episodes, 1967)
- T.H.E. Cat – Crystal Pierson (1 episode, 1967)
- Hogan's Heroes – Lady Valerie Stanford (1 episode, 1969)
- Mannix – Sheila (1 episode, 1970)
