= The Tall T =

1957 film by Budd Boetticher

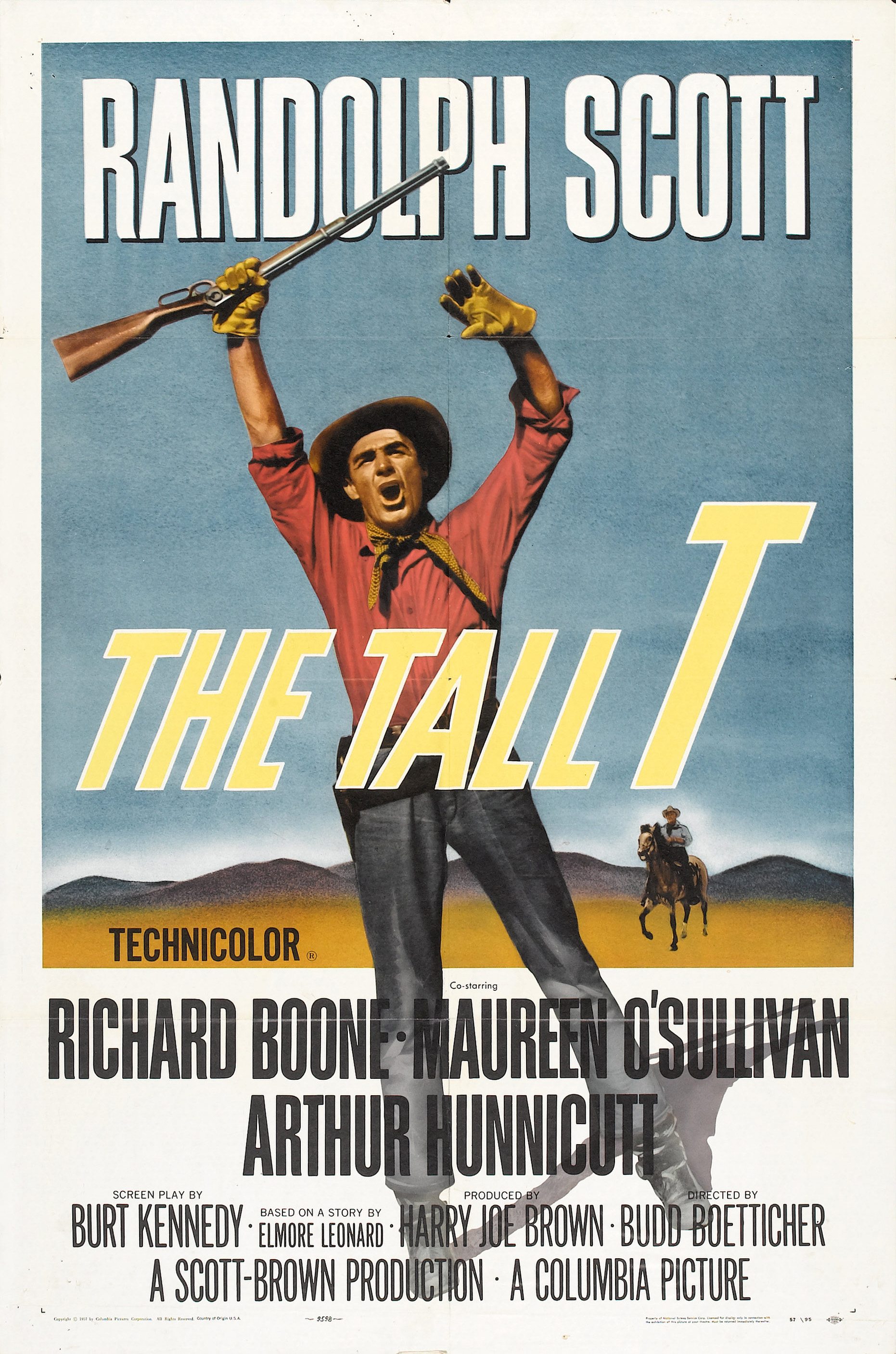
- Theatrical release poster
- Directed by: Budd Boetticher
- Screenplay by: Burt Kennedy
- Based on: "The Captives"; 1955 novelette in Argosy Magazine by Elmore Leonard
- Produced by: Harry Joe Brown
- Starring: Randolph Scott; Richard Boone; Maureen O'Sullivan
- Cinematography: Charles Lawton Jr.
- Edited by: Al Clark
- Music by: Heinz Roemheld
- Color process: Technicolor
- Production companies: Producers-Actors Corporation; Scott-Brown Productions
- Distributed by: Columbia Pictures
- Release date: April 2, 1957 (US)
- Running time: 78 minutes
- Country: United States
- Language: English

The Tall T is a 1957 American Western film directed by Budd Boetticher and starring Randolph Scott, Richard Boone, and Maureen O'Sullivan. Adapted by Burt Kennedy from the 1955 short story "The Captives" by Elmore Leonard, the film is about an independent former ranch foreman who is kidnapped along with an heiress, who is being held for ransom by three ruthless outlaws. In 2000, The Tall T was selected for preservation in the United States National Film Registry by the Library of Congress, being deemed "culturally, historically, or aesthetically significant."

== Plot ==
Passing a stagecoach way station on his journey into town, Pat Brennan agrees to return with some store-bought candy for the friendly station manager's young son. At a ranch where he once worked, Brennan tries to buy a bull, but is talked into riding one. If he wins, he gets the bull. If he loses he has to give up his horse. Brennan loses, and is forced to walk home, carrying his saddle.

He manages to get a lift from stagecoach driver Rintoon, an acquaintance of Brennan's from town, who has been hired specially to transport the newlyweds Willard and Doretta Mims. Doretta is a plain woman, but the daughter of a rich copper mine owner. It tickles Brennan, who tells Rintoon this is the first time he's ever been on a honeymoon.

When they stop at the way-station, they are mistaken for the regular stage by three outlaws, Chink, Billy Jack, and their leader, Frank Usher, who have already killed the station manager and his son. Rintoon goes for his shotgun, only to be killed by gun-happy Chink.

Terrified of sharing the same fate, Willard suggests to the outlaws that ransoming his wife would be far more profitable than robbing the stage. Frank likes the idea. He also immediately recognises, and is disgusted by, the groom's clear lack of devotion to his bride.

The outlaw leader takes a liking to Brennan, later telling him that under different circumstances the two of them might have been friends. After ordering Billy Jack to ride along with Willard and deliver a ransom note demanding $50,000 to Doretta's father, Frank takes the woman and Brennan to a remote hideout. Willard returns, saying his father-in-law has agreed and is gathering the money. Willard is told he is no longer needed and can leave. A coward, he does not even bother to say goodbye to his new wife, which deepens Frank's disgust for him. As Willard begins to ride off, Chink ruthlessly shoots him down.

Brennan knows full well that he and Doretta will also end up dead once the ransom is paid. He tells the distraught widow to collect herself and be ready to take any opportunity for life that presents itself. He then takes her in his arms. She hesitates, then kisses him. She confesses she married Willard because she was getting older and did not want to be alone.

Billy Jack and Chink are left behind to guard the hostages while Frank goes off to collect the money. Brennan plants the thought that their ringleader might just ride off alone with all the money, so Chink leaves the camp to keep an eye out for Frank. Brennan suggests to Billy Jack that he take advantage of Doretta, a lonely woman denied even her wedding night. Billy Jack does indeed try to force himself on Doretta, whereupon Brennan overpowers him and shoots him dead.

Chink hears the shots and turns back. Brennan kills him. Frank then returns with the money. Brennan however gets the drop on him, so Frank surrenders his revolver and the money. He slowly walks away, gambling that Brennan will not shoot him in the back. He mounts his horse and rides off. However, he has a rifle stowed in his saddle, so he pulls it and turns around; he rides back towards Brennan, who is forced to kill the outlaw. Walking away, side by side, Doretta reaches for Brennan's arm, which he places around her. He tells her it is going to be a good day.

== Cast ==
- Randolph Scott as Pat Brennan
- Richard Boone as Frank Usher
- Maureen O'Sullivan as Doretta Mims
- Arthur Hunnicutt as Rintoon
- Skip Homeier as Billy Jack
- Henry Silva as "Chink"
- John Hubbard as Willard Mims
- Robert Burton as Tenvoorde

== Production ==
John Wayne ran Batjac Productions with producer Robert Fellows. Burt Kennedy was under contract to the company, and he wrote The Tall T as a vehicle for Wayne, based on Elmore Leonard's The Captive; Kennedy said he had persuaded Wayne to buy the rights to the story. Fellows and Wayne decided to go their separate ways and as part of the settlement, Fellows was given the rights to the script of The Tall T which he sold to Harry Joe Brown. Kennedy said, "I did some re-write on it, not too much, but that was a good script. That was a good picture. Seven Men [from Now]‘s good but The Tall T was different, because it didn’t have as much of the girl. She was good, I liked the gal."

== Awards and nominations ==
The film is recognized by American Film Institute in these lists:

- 2008: AFI's 10 Top 10:
  - Nominated Western Film

== Home media ==
In 2008 a DVD box set of five Budd Boetticher films starring Randolph Scott was released. Along with The Tall T the set includes Buchanan Rides Alone, Decision at Sundown, Ride Lonesome, and Comanche Station.

Mill Creek Entertainment released a 6-disk Blu-ray set of 12 Randolph Scott films including The Tall T and the other Ranown Westerns, i.e., the Boetticher/Scott films.

The Criterion Collection announced the box set The Ranown Westerns: Five Films Directed by Budd Boetticher including the 5 films that were in the DVD box set. The set was released on July 18, 2023.

== See also ==
- List of American films of 1957
- List of cult films
