= 13 West Street =

1962 film

- Film poster
- Directed by: Philip Leacock
- Screenplay by: Bernard C. Schoenfeld; Robert Presnell Jr.
- Based on: The Tiger Among Us (1957) by Leigh Brackett
- Produced by: William Bloom; Alan Ladd
- Starring: Alan Ladd; Rod Steiger
- Cinematography: Charles Lawton Jr.
- Edited by: Al Clark
- Music by: George Duning
- Color process: Black and white
- Production company: Ladd Enterprises
- Distributed by: Columbia Pictures
- Release date: June 6, 1962
- Running time: 80 minutes
- Country: United States
- Language: English

13 West Street is a 1962 American neo-noir crime film directed by Philip Leacock and starring Alan Ladd and Rod Steiger: Ladd's own production company produced the film. It is based on the 1957 novel The Tiger Among Us by Leigh Brackett, who called the film "very, very dull."

== Plot ==
After rocket scientist Walt Sherrill's car runs out of gas on a deserted city street, he is assaulted and viciously beaten up by the occupants of a speeding car, a group of well-dressed young men. Sherill becomes frustrated when the police, including investigating officer Sergeant Koleski, seem slow to act and too busy to find the culprits, so Sherill pursues them himself.

The quest becomes an obsession for Sherrill, threatening his job and marriage. He purchases a gun and shoots tin cans as targets. His wife Tracey becomes afraid of what Sherrill is becoming and what the gang might do to him. One of the gang members throws a ball bearing ball through the Sherrills' window as a threat.

One night, Sherill spots a convertible that resembles one belonging to his assailants and tails it at high speed. The driver is a frightened teenage girl who calls the police, and Sherill spends an uncomfortable night in jail before Koleski has him released.

Sherill hires Finney, a private investigator, whose work leads him to Chuck Landry, the gang's leader. Sherill's nonstop search for revenge causes one member of the gang to commit suicide. Finney tails Landry at high speed on a winding road but his car plunges down a ravine and he is killed. Landry then goes to Sherill's home, where he menaces Tracey and plans to shoot Sherill when he returns home. Landry escapes from the police but Sherill takes his address from his abandoned car and is waiting there when Landry arrives. Sherrill beats him savagely with his cane. On the verge of killing him by drowning in the Landry family's swimming pool, Sherill finally relents, handing Landry to Koleski to be placed under arrest.

== Cast ==
- Alan Ladd as Walt Sherill
- Rod Steiger as Detective Sergeant Koleski
- Michael Callan as Chuck Landry
- Dolores Dorn as Tracey Sherill
- Kenneth MacKenna as Paul Logan
- Margaret Hayes as Mrs. Landry
- Stanley Adams as Finney
- Chris Robinson as Everett Bush
- Jeanne Cooper as Mrs. Quinn
- Arnold Merritt as Bill
- Mark Slade as Tommy
- Henry Beckman as Detective Joe Bradford
- Clegg Hoyt as Noddy

== Production ==
Leigh Brackett's novel The Tiger Among Us was originally published in 1957. Film rights were purchased by producer Charles Schnee, who had just left MGM and signed a deal with Columbia Pictures. He hired John Michael Hayes to write the script. John Wayne was announced as a possible star. It was then reported that Valentine Davies was working on the script, which had been retitled Fear No Evil.

Production plans were delayed when Schnee announced his departure from Columbia, frustrated with the studio's inability to advance any of his films to the development stage because of "almost insurmountable casting difficulties." The project stayed with Columbia and was assigned to producer Boris Kaplan. Roger Presnell wrote a version of the script. Philip Leacock was given the job as director and Alan Ladd and Rod Steiger were cast in the leads. Contract played Michael Callan played a key role.

The title The Tiger Among Us was changed to avoid the possible misconception among audiences that it was a jungle film. The new title was 13 East Street, but Ladd requested a change in the title's direction. He said: "The story concerned a teen-age gang from Los Angeles' east side, but I suggested locale be switched to the swank purlieu of Bel-Air. I have nothing against Bel-Air but I want to show that juvenile delinquency can breed in exclusive areas, too." Ladd also asked for the number of gang members to be increased from three to six, saying: "You can't have a hero fighting just three kids."

Filming began in April 1961.

== Reception ==
In a contemporary review for The New York Times, critic Howard Thompson wrote: "The first half of '13 West Street' is pretty darn good. It's convincing and diverting to watch Alan Ladd as the determined victim and, especially, Rod Steiger as an eagle-eyed detective, try to find five young boys who for no reason nearly beat Mr. Ladd to death. ... Why did they nearly kill Mr. Ladd? Don't ask us. The picture is more concerned with the hero's almost paranoic obsession to get them. It maintains a man shouldn't take the law into his own hands and then whips up a hot melodramatic lather to prove it."

Reviewer Cyrus Durgin of The Boston Globe wrote: "This sort of story perhaps can be told better in the larger form of the novel, but screenwriters Schoenfeld and Presnell, and director Leacock have done a respectable job with it. To be sure, the conventions of the violence film, including a chase that kills a private investigator, are duly observed, for the film is leveled to a large, mass audience. I must say you experience a certain low satisfaction when Chuck gets his."

== See also ==
- List of American films of 1962
- List of hood films
