= Uncle Vanya (1957 film) =

- Directed by: John Goetz; Franchot Tone
- Written by: Stark Young
- Based on: play Uncle Vanya by Anton Chekov
- Produced by: Franchot Tone; Marion Parsonnet
- Starring: Franchot Tone; Dolores Dorn-Heft; George Voskovec; Peggy McCay; Clarence Derwent; Gerald Hiken
- Music by: Werner Janssen
- Distributed by: Continental Distributing
- Release date: 1957
- Running time: 98 minutes
- Language: English
- Budget: $250,000

Uncle Vanya is a 1957 American film adaptation of the 1899 play Uncle Vanya by Anton Chekhov. Filmed concurrently with an Off Broadway production, it was both co-produced and co-directed by actor Franchot Tone, who starred as Dr. Astroff. Tone's wife at the time, Dolores Dorn-Heft, co-starred as Elena Andreevna, appearing in the only role not featuring an actor from the stage version in New York, where the part was played by Signe Hasso. The title role was played by George Voskovec.

Edited from Stark Young's translation of Chekhov's Russian text, the film runs 98 minutes. It was released on DVD in June, 2010.

== Production ==
Tone performed the play off Broadway in 1956. He decided to make a film of it, using more sets. It was shot over 24 days.

== See also ==
- List of American films of 1957
