= Ride Lonesome (film) =

1959 film by Budd Boetticher

- Theatrical release poster
- Directed by: Budd Boetticher
- Written by: Burt Kennedy
- Produced by: Budd Boetticher
- Starring: Randolph Scott; Karen Steele; Pernell Roberts; Lee Van Cleef; James Coburn
- Cinematography: Charles Lawton Jr.
- Edited by: Jerome Thoms
- Music by: Heinz Roemheld
- Color process: Eastman Color
- Production company: Ranown Pictures Corp.
- Distributed by: Columbia Pictures
- Release date: February 15, 1959 (USA)
- Running time: 73 minutes
- Country: United States
- Language: English

Ride Lonesome is a 1959 American CinemaScope Western film directed by Budd Boetticher and starring Randolph Scott, Karen Steele, Pernell Roberts, Lee Van Cleef, and James Coburn in his film debut. This Eastmancolor film is one of Boetticher's so-called "Ranown cycle" of westerns, made with Randolph Scott, executive producer Harry Joe Brown and screenwriter Burt Kennedy, beginning with Seven Men from Now.

== Plot ==
Bounty hunter Ben Brigade catches up with Billy John, who is wanted for murder. While being captured, Billy tells his gang to escape and tell Billy's brother Frank what has happened. When Ben and Billy arrive at a swing station, they are greeted by Sam Boone and his partner Whit. Carrie Lane, the absent station master's wife, emerges holding a rifle and orders the men to leave. A stagecoach then crashes into the corral, with the driver and passengers massacred by Mescalero Indians.

After burying the dead, Brigade and the others hole up at the station, waiting for the Indians to attack. Boone tells Brigade that he and Whit intend to capture Billy and earn an amnesty for all their past crimes by turning him in. Next morning, as Brigade is preparing to take Carrie to the next swing station (where he expects to find her husband, who left to round up horses scattered by the Indians), a band of Indians approaches. The chief offers to trade a horse for Carrie. Insisting that they play along, Brigade takes Carrie to the chief. However, she recognizes the horse offered in exchange as belonging to her husband. Realizing that he is dead, she screams, prompting the Indians to ride off.

The group leaves for the next swing station, but Brigade spots some Indians. They take cover at a nearby adobe shack. They shoot several Indians and when Carrie kills the chief with her rifle, the remaining Indians leave. That night, Boone tells Whit that he thinks Brigade is making it easy for Frank to follow them, but does not know why. The next morning, Billy tries to escape, but gets tricked by Boone and fails. As they continue on, Boone offers to pay Brigade the price on Billy's head if he will hand him over, but Brigade refuses.

Less than a day before they reach Santa Cruz, Brigade and the others pass a hanging tree. Brigade becomes irritable and orders them to camp. Whit tells Billy about the amnesty. Billy says that Frank will kill all the others when he comes for Billy, but Boone arrives and tells Whit to shoot Billy if he tries to get them to let him go. Boone tells Carrie that he will look out for her and warns her that Brigade will never reach town alive. Carrie voices her disgust over killing for money, and Brigade confides that his real target is Frank. When Brigade was sheriff of Santa Cruz, he arrested Frank, who after being released from jail kidnapped Brigade's wife and hung her from the tree.

Having overheard the story of his wife's murder, Boone offers to cover Brigade in his confrontation. Brigade orders Billy to mount his horse, slips a noose around Billy's neck and leads him to the hanging tree. When Frank and his gang arrive, Brigade challenges Frank to stop the hanging. Frank opens fire, causing Billy's horse to bolt and leave Billy swinging from the tree. Brigade kills Frank and shoots the rope hanging Billy from the tree, while Boone and Whit chase off the rest of the gang. Brigade turns Billy over to Boone and warns him to keep his promise about going straight. After the others ride off toward Santa Cruz, Brigade sets the tree on fire.

== Cast ==
- Randolph Scott as Ben Brigade
- Karen Steele as Mrs. Carrie Lane
- Pernell Roberts as Sam Boone
- James Best as Billy John
- Lee Van Cleef as Frank
- James Coburn as Whit
- Bennie Dobbins as Outlaw (uncredited)
- Roy Jenson as Outlaw (uncredited)
- Boyd "Red" Morgan as Outlaw (uncredited)
- Boyd Stockman as Indian Chief (uncredited)

== Production ==
It was an original script by Burt Kennedy.

The film was shot at Lone Pine starting 14 August 1958.

Boetticher recalled the movie "is one of the few stories we could end on the screen. Before, we always let Randy 'ride off into the sunset.' We always gave you the feeling that there was a tomorrow. I never knew what the tomorrow was in Ride Lonesome. I could write fourteen original scripts starting with the burning of that cross."

In the original script, the characters played by James Coburn and Pernell Roberts were meant to die. However Boetticher felt the actors were too charming to kill off and claims that during filming he contacted the studio executive, Sam Briskin, asking that they be allowed to live. Boetticher told Briskin he would shoot two endings, one where they died and another where they did not, but he only filmed the latter. However he said the studio "liked what we did so much that they didn't argue about it." Boetticher also claims that Randolph Scott was so impressed with Coburn's performance that the star suggested Coburn be given more lines of dialogue.

== Reception ==
Variety called it "another good Western from the Ranown Production team" which was "above the general run. Budd Boetticher... had a tough, honest screenplay by Burt Kennedy, and he has given it perception and tension."

Filmink argued "Coburn is lanky, confident, cool, dangerous, humorous – a screen natural."

== Home media ==
In 2008, a DVD box set of five Budd Boetticher films starring Randolph Scott was released by Sony Columbia. Along with Ride Lonesome the set includes Buchanan Rides Alone, Decision at Sundown, Comanche Station, and The Tall T.In 2018, a Region Free Blu-ray set of the same films, many of them restored, was released by Powerhouse films, on the 'Indicator' label. The title was 'Five Tall Tales: Budd Boetticher & Randolph Scott At Columbia, 1957-1960'. In 2021, the Scott/Boetticher films, along with other Randolph Scott features, were also released on Blu-ray by Mill Creek Entertainment.

== See also ==
- List of American films of 1959
