= Beatrice Kay =

American actress

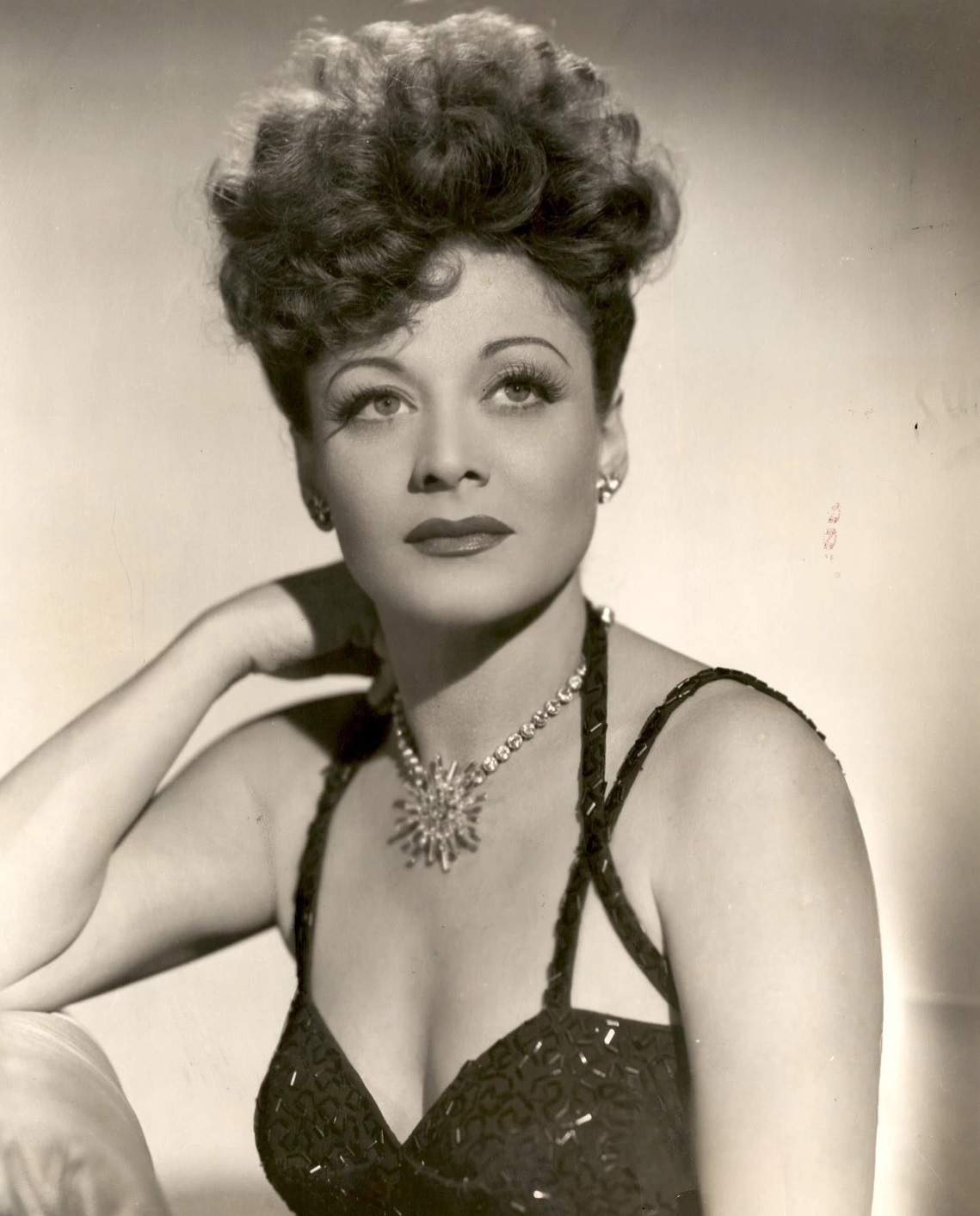
- Kay in 1946
- Born: Hannah Beatrice Kuper; April 21, 1907; New York City, U.S.
- Died: November 8, 1986 (aged 79); North Hollywood, California, U.S.
- Resting place: Westwood Memorial Park, Los Angeles, California, U.S.
- Occupations: Singer; vaudevillian; music hall performer; stage actress; screen actress
- Years active: 1945–1974

Beatrice Kay (April 21, 1907– November 8, 1986) was an American singer, vaudevillian, music hall performer, and stage and film actress.

== Background ==
Born in New York City as Hannah Beatrice Kuper, Kay performed as Honey Kuper and Honey Day for part of her career in vaudeville, radio, motion pictures, sound recordings, night clubs, and television. Her career began at the age of six as "Little Lord Fauntleroy" in stock theater in Louisville, Kentucky. She went on to become a headliner at Billy Rose's Diamond Horseshoe Nightclub in New York. She was on The Mercury Theatre on the Air (directed by Orson Welles), and eventually hosted a radio show, The Beatrice Kay Show, in 1946. Also on radio, she sang regularly on Gaslight Gaieties and Gay Nineties Revue.

On Broadway, Kay appeared in Tell Me Pretty Maiden (1937), Provincetown Follies (1935), Jarnegan (1928), and Secrets (1922).

She appeared at top nightclubs, including San Francisco's Fairmont Hotel Venetian Room, the Moulin Rouge in Paris, Hollywood's famed Ciro's in Los Angeles, and at the El Rancho Hotel in Las Vegas. She also recorded several phonograph albums, and appeared in a 1945 motion picture about the club where she had performed in her earlier years—Billy Rose's Diamond Horseshoe (the film starred Betty Grable and Dick Haymes).

In 1961–62, Kay provided the voice of Sue in the ABC-TV cartoon series Calvin and the Colonel.

She appeared with Cliff Robertson in 1961's Underworld U.S.A. and in 1969's A Time for Dying, with Victor Jory and Audie Murphy. In 1974, she had a bit part in the film Ginger in the Morning (which starred Susan Oliver, Sissy Spacek and Monte Markham).

Songs which she helped popularize include "A Bird in a Gilded Cage", "No! No! A Thousand Times No!!", "The Band Played On", "Mention My Name In Sheboygan", and "Ta-ra-ra Boom-de-ay".

Kay toured on the road in 1972 with The Big Show Of 1936 (co-starring Ben Blue, Jackie Coogan, the Ink Spots, Virginia O'Brien, Cass Daley, Ray Bolger and the Wiere Brothers), which played major concert venues including New York's Madison Square Garden.

She retired to operate a holiday resort dude ranch but returned to show business after a devastating fire which destroyed her home. She headlined a month-long booking opening Milt Larsen's Mayfair Music Hall in Santa Monica, California, with Bernard Fox and Larry "Seymour" Vincent.

She died in North Hollywood, California, in 1986, aged 79, having been in poor health after suffering a series of strokes.

== Film and television appearances ==
Over her career, Kay appeared in more than a dozen television shows, including:

- Diamond Horseshoe (1945) - Claire Williams
- The Danny Thomas Show (starring Danny Thomas) in the 1959, season 7, episode, "Nightclub Owners"
- The Alaskans (1959, TV Series)
- Underworld U.S.A. (1961) - Sandy
- Bonanza (1961, TV Series) (with Lorne Greene and Michael Landon) - Clementine Hawkins in the episode "The Burma Rarity"
- Hawaiian Eye (1961, TV Series) - Mrs. Royerton
- The Real McCoys (1961, TV Series) - Eve Dockweiler
- The Rifleman (1963, TV Series) (with Chuck Connors and Johnny Crawford) - Goldie Drain
- The Alfred Hitchcock Hour (1963, TV Series) (Season 2 Episode 1: "A Home Away from Home") - Sarah Sanders
- A Time for Dying (1969) - Mamie
- Ironside (1969, TV Series) (with Raymond Burr) - Katie
- Adam-12 (1971, TV Series) - Manager
- Night Gallery (1971, TV Series) - Mrs. Gibbons (segment "Cool Air")
- Ginger in the Morning (1974) - Lady in Park (final film role)
