= Six Bridges to Cross =

1955 film by Joseph Pevney

- Film poster by Reynold Brown
- Directed by: Joseph Pevney
- Screenplay by: Sydney Boehm
- Based on: They Stole $25,000,000 – And Got Away with It by Joseph F. Dinneen
- Produced by: Aaron Rosenberg
- Starring: Tony Curtis; George Nader; Julie Adams
- Cinematography: William H. Daniels
- Edited by: Russell F. Schoengarth
- Color process: Black and white
- Production company: Universal-International Pictures
- Distributed by: Universal-International Pictures
- Release date: January 21, 1955
- Running time: 96 minutes
- Country: United States
- Language: English
- Box office: $1.8 million (US)

Six Bridges to Cross or 6 Bridges to Cross is a 1955 American film noir crime film directed by Joseph Pevney and starring Tony Curtis, George Nader and Julie Adams. Six Bridges to Cross is based upon the famous 1950 Great Brink's Robbery of Boston, Massachusetts in which the thieves made off with roughly $2.5 million.

== Plot ==
Jerry Florea (Tony Curtis) is planning a heist. The story begins with the events which led a young Florea (Sal Mineo) to become a crook. One day he is shot during a robbery and as a result an amenable policeman and his wife take him under their wing. As a young man he deludes them, and pretends to no longer have criminal intent and even gets a job at the Brinks. They are unaware he is preparing to rob the establishment. It is only after he and his gang pull off the heist that Florea reconsiders his actions and attempts to make amends for the crime.

== Cast ==
- Tony Curtis as Jerry Florea
- George Nader as Edward Gallagher
- Julie Adams as Ellen Gallagher
- Jay C. Flippen as Vincent Concannon
- Sal Mineo as Jerry as a boy
- Jan Merlin as Andy Norris
- Richard Castle as Skids Radzevich
- William Murphy as Red Flanagan
- Kendall Clark as Mr. Sanborn
- Don Keefer as Mr. Sherman
- Harry Bartell as Father Bonelli
- Tito Vuolo as Angie

== Production ==
The screenplay for the film was written by Sydney Boehm, based on Joseph F. Dinneen's They Stole $25,000,000 – And Got Away with It. The film was shot on location in Boston.

Jeff Chandler was to play the lead but refused and was put on suspension by Universal.

A pre-fame Clint Eastwood supposedly auditioned for George Nader's role in May 1954, his first real audition, but was rejected by Pevney. The part of the young Florea was given to a 15-year-old Sal Mineo. Mineo had also successfully auditioned for a part in The Private War of Major Benson as a cadet colonel opposite Charlton Heston.

== Soundtrack ==
Sammy Davis Jr. was hired to sing the title track written by friend Jeff Chandler and Henry Mancini, recording it on December 2, 1954.

The overall score was composed by Frank Skinner and Herman Stein but they went uncredited in the film for their contributions.

== See also ==
- List of American films of 1955
