= Mr. Soft Touch =

1949 film by Gordon Douglas, Henry Levin

- Theatrical release poster
- Directed by: Gordon Douglas; Henry Levin
- Screenplay by: Orin Jannings
- Story by: Milton Holmes
- Produced by: Milton Holmes
- Starring: Glenn Ford; Evelyn Keyes
- Cinematography: Charles Lawton Jr. Joseph Walker
- Edited by: Richard Fantl
- Music by: Heinz Roemheld
- Color process: Black and white
- Production company: Columbia Pictures
- Distributed by: Columbia Pictures
- Release date: August 1, 1949
- Running time: 93 minutes
- Country: United States
- Language: English
- Box office: $1.6 million

Mr. Soft Touch is a 1949 American film noir crime film directed by Gordon Douglas and Henry Levin and starring Glenn Ford and Evelyn Keyes. The film is also known as House of Settlement.

== Plot ==
Polish American Joe Miracle (Mirakowski) returns from fighting in World War II, only to find his San Francisco nightclub taken over by the mob, and his friend and partner Leo missing and presumed murdered. He steals $100,000 from his former business, planning to leave the country. Victor Christopher (Leo's brother) and his wife Clara had purchased a ticket for him for an ocean voyage. However, he discovers that they could only get him passage on a ship that sails on Christmas Eve, two days later. He has to hide until then. When the police come to stop Victor because he is causing a disturbance, Joe pretends to be him in order to spend the night safely in jail. However, Jenny Jones, a kind-hearted local social worker who was visiting earlier at Victor and Clara's apartment because of reported domestic problems, gets him remanded into her custody instead.

She takes him to the Borden Street Settlement House, where the down-and-out are helped. As they get better acquainted, Jenny and Joe begin falling in love, though she turns down his advances, as she believes he is Victor. Joe falls from a ladder while hanging some Christmas decorations tumbling onto and breaking an old upright piano. He later goes to a nearby piano store (which he knows is actually a front for a backroom gambling parlor), and pretending to be a detective newly assigned to the precinct, cons the so-called salesman/owner into donating a piano in return for Joe turning a blind eye to the illicit activities. However, he is recognized by local muckraking newspaper columnist Henry "Early" Byrd, who had written about and broadcast radio news reports and opinions about the nightclub heist, and who possibly could have done it. Jenny and her co-workers are stunned when a large grand piano is delivered, as well as linens and blankets.

Byrd tries to find out from Jenny if Joe is staying at the settlement house, but she refuses to tell him anything. From Byrd's descriptions and questions, Jenny figures out that Joe is not Victor. When she finds out Joe has acquired a pistol, she insists that he leave the premises. During their argument, he describes his lifelong drive to get out of the "gutter" where he was born, and accuses her of living in an ivory tower and not knowing the real sordid underside of life; she shames him by telling of how a drunken blow from her father in her childhood rendered her deaf, so she has to use a hearing aid.

Byrd tries to get Joe to tell him the name of the man providing protection to the crooks, but Joe refuses to talk. When he collects his hidden loot, Jenny pleads with him to give it back so they can start a life together afresh. He counters by asking her to leave the country with him. Neither accepts the other's proposal. Meanwhile, the mobsters force Clara to tell them where Joe is hiding out and start a fire at the charity house to smoke him out. They recover the money, but the settlement house is left smoldering in ruins. Joe tries to justify himself to Jenny, but she pulls out her hearing aid to show him she is not listening.

Joe enters the gambling joint through a secret passageway and takes the money back from the office vault of the new crime boss, Barney Teener. Joe hires some homeless men to dress up as Santa Claus to distribute presents to the children at a fundraiser back at the settlement house. Joe slips in as one of them and leaves the money to pay for the rebuilding of the settlement house. Jenny realizes what is really going on and chases him out into the street, calling his name. Hearing this, the waiting mobsters shoot Joe in the back. Seeing himself literally lying in the gutter, he begs Jenny to take him out of it. She lifts him into her arms, embracing him and says he is not in the gutter anymore. The film ends, leaving it unclear whether he will live or die.

== Cast ==
- Glenn Ford as Joe Miracle. This was also the last of six films in which Ford and Keyes co-starred together.
- Evelyn Keyes as Jenny Jones
- John Ireland as Henry "Early" Byrd
- Beulah Bondi as Clara Hangale
- Percy Kilbride as Rickle
- Clara Blandick as Susan Balmuss
- Ted de Corsia as Rainey
- Stanley Clements as Yonzi
- Roman Bohnen as Barney Teener. This was Bohnen's final film. He succumbed to a heart attack in March 1949, five months before the film's release.
- Lora Lee Michel as Sonya
- Harry Shannon as Police Sergeant Garrett
- Charles Trowbridge as Judge Fuller (uncredited)

== Production ==
Henry Levin took over directing from Gordon Douglas.

== See also ==
- List of Christmas films
