= John F. "Jack" Hasey =

American soldier & intelligence officer (1916-2005)

John Freeman Hasey
- Born: November 3, 1916; Brockton, Massachusetts, United States
- Died: May 9, 2005 (aged 88)
- Occupations: Jeweller; Soldier; Intelligence officer
- Military career
- Allegiance: Free France; United States
- Branch: Free French Army; CIA
- Service years: 1940-1945
- Units: Iroquois Ambulance Corps; French Foreign Legion
- Conflicts: World War II; Winter War; Battle of Damascus
- Awards: Légion d'honneur Liberty Cross

John Freeman Hasey (3 November 1916 – 9 May 2005) was an American captain in the French Foreign Legion during World War II and a senior operations officer with the CIA afterwards. Hasey was one of only four Americans, including Dwight D. Eisenhower, to have been named a Companion of the Ordre de la Libération, France's highest World War II honor.

== Early life ==
Hasey was born in Brockton, Massachusetts, in 1916 and raised in Bridgewater, Massachusetts. In 1936, leaving Columbia University after only one year, Hasey headed to France, telling his parents that he intended to study at the Sorbonne. At the height of the depression, Hasey struggled to find work, but eventually landed a position as a salesman for the French jeweler Cartier where he would travel between France, New York, and Monte Carlo handling the accounts of people such as Douglas Fairbanks and Marlene Dietrich.

== Military career ==
When the Winter War between The Soviet Union and Finland broke out in 1939, Hasey, along with other Americans, formed an ambulance unit, the Iroquois Ambulance Corps, and headed to the war front to help aid the Finns. Later, some time in the 1950s, Finland awarded him the Liberty Cross. After the war, and having recovered from a wound to his arm, Hasey planned to return to his work at Cartier.

With the German invasion of Western Europe, Hasey promptly volunteered to join the Free French Forces led by General Charles de Gaulle. During fighting around Damascus, Syria on June 20, 1941, Hasey's right jaw and larynx were shot away by enemy machine gun fire. He was decorated by de Gaulle as "the first American to shed blood for the liberation of France." After his recovery, Hasey became a liaison between de Gaulle and Eisenhower. During 1942, he co-wrote a book, Yankee Fighter: The Story of an American in the Free French Foreign Legion with Joseph F Dinneen. In August 1943, he became an aide-de-camp on the staff of General Marie Pierre Koenig, and remained with Koenig during his term as military Governor of Paris, August 1944.

== Post-war ==
In 1950, he joined the CIA and worked in 17 countries until his retirement in 1974.

In 1996, French President Jacques Chirac named Hasey an officer in the Légion d'honneur.

On May 9, 2005, Hasey died at age 88 from complications after a stroke.

== Honors ==
- Compagnon de la Libération
- Officer of the Légion d'honneur
- Croix de Guerre 39–45 with Palm by General Catroux
- Combatant's Cross
- Insignia for the Military Wounded
- Order of the Cross of Liberty
- Colonial Medal with "Free French Africa" clasp
- 1939–1945 Commemorative war medal (France)
