= Comanche Station =

1960 film by Budd Boetticher

- Theatrical release poster
- Directed by: Budd Boetticher
- Written by: Burt Kennedy
- Produced by: Budd Boetticher
- Starring: Randolph Scott
- Cinematography: Charles Lawton Jr.
- Edited by: Edwin H. Bryant
- Music by: Mischa Bakaleinikoff (uncredited)
- Color process: Eastman Color
- Production company: Ranown Pictures Corp.
- Distributed by: Columbia Pictures
- Release date: February 16, 1960 (USA)
- Running time: 73 minutes
- Country: United States
- Language: English

Comanche Station is a 1960 American CinemaScope Western film directed by Budd Boetticher and starring Randolph Scott. The film was the last of Boetticher's late 1950s Ranown Cycle. It was filmed in the Eastern Sierra area of Central California near Lone Pine, California, not far from the foot of Mount Whitney. The towering granitic boulders known as the Alabama Hills served as the backdrop for the film's opening and closing scenes.

== Plot ==
Jefferson Cody, whose wife was captured by Comanches, frees another man's wife and is taking her home. Three outlaws, led by the charming but malevolent Ben Lane, reveal that the woman's husband has offered a $5,000 reward, making the woman, Lordsburg resident Mrs. Lowe, suspicious of Cody's motives in coming to her rescue.

Lane is known to Cody, who helped court-martial him from the army for killing "tame" Indians. The Comanche are on the warpath due to recent scalpings. They kill Frank, one of Lane's men, and make repeated attempts to kill the rest of the party. Lane attaches himself to Cody, intending to make it look like the Comanches/Mohawks killed Cody and to take the reward for himself.

Although her husband did not try to find her himself, the reward for the return of Mrs. Lowe is "dead or alive," so Lane prefers dead so she won't be able to testify against him. He tries to ambush her and Cody, and when partner Dobie refuses to help, Lane shoots him.

In a showdown in the hills, Cody gets the better of Lane. He escorts the woman back home, discovering that her husband is blind. Before he can be paid the $5,000, Cody rides away.

== Cast ==
- Randolph Scott as Jefferson Cody
- Claude Akins as Ben Lane
- Nancy Gates as Nancy Lowe
- Skip Homeier as Frank
- Richard Rust as Dobie
- Rand Brooks as Station Man
- Dyke Johnson as John Lowe

== Production ==
It was an original script by Burt Kennedy.

== Home media ==
In 2008 a DVD box set of five Budd Boetticher films starring Randolph Scott was released. Along with Comanche Station the set includes Buchanan Rides Alone, Decision at Sundown, Ride Lonesome, and The Tall T.

== See also ==
- List of American films of 1960
