= Randolph Scott =

American actor (1898–1987)

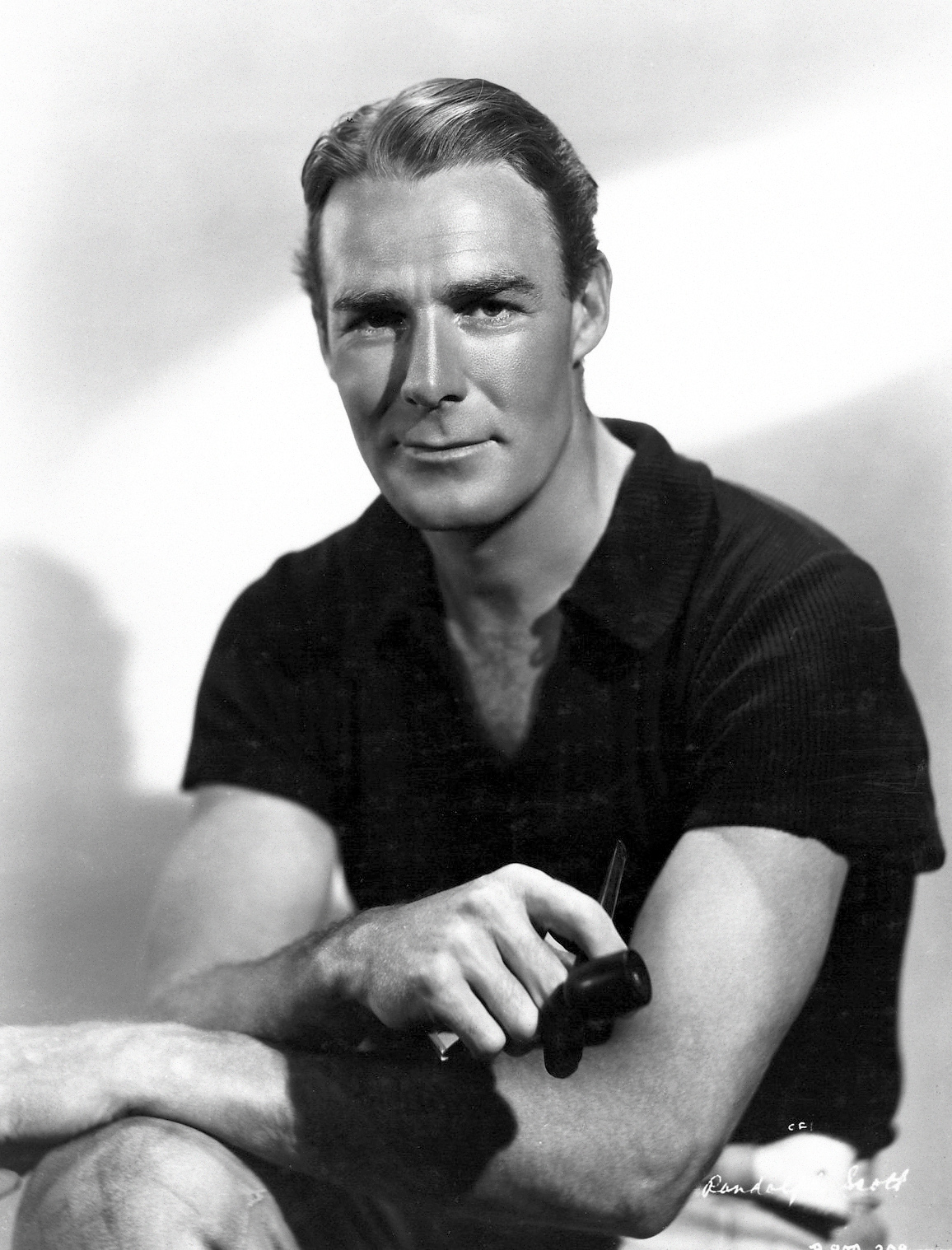
- Scott in the early 1930s
- Born: George Randolph Scott; January 23, 1898; Orange County, Virginia, U.S.
- Died: March 2, 1987 (aged 89); Beverly Hills, California, U.S.
- Resting place: Elmwood Cemetery in Charlotte, North Carolina
- Occupation: Actor
- Years active: 1928–1962
- Spouses: Marion DuPont (m. 1936; div. 1939) Patricia Stillman (m. 1944)
- Children: 2
- Military career
- Allegiance: United States
- Branch: United States Army
- Service years: 1917–1919
- Rank: Second lieutenant
- Unit: 2nd Trench Mortar Battalion
- Conflicts: World War I

George Randolph Scott (January 23, 1898 – March 2, 1987) was an American film actor, whose Hollywood career ran from 1928 to 1962. He was a leading man for all but the first three years of his cinematic career, appearing in more than 60 Westerns, and over 40 dramas, comedies, musicals, adventures, war, horror and fantasy films.

During the early 1950s, Scott was a consistent box-office draw. In the annual Motion Picture Herald Top Ten Polls, his name appeared every year from 1950 to 1953. Scott also appeared in Quigley's Top Ten Money Makers Poll, from 1950 to 1953.

== Early years ==
Scott was born January 23, 1898, in Orange County, Virginia, and reared in Charlotte, North Carolina, the second of six children born to parents of Scottish descent. His father was George Grant Scott, born in Franklin, Virginia, the first person licensed as a certified public accountant (CPA) in North Carolina. His mother was Lucille Crane Scott, born in Luray, Virginia, a member of a wealthy North Carolina family.

Because of his family's financial status, Randolph was able to attend private schools, such as Woodberry Forest School. From an early age, Scott developed and displayed his athleticism, excelling in football, baseball, horse racing, and swimming. His height (6 feet 2 and 1/4 inches (1.89 m)) was an asset in these pursuits and in his acting.

=== World War I ===
In April 1917, the United States entered World War I. In July, Scott joined a unit of the North Carolina National Guard. He was trained as an artillery observer and earned promotion to corporal in October 1917 and sergeant in February 1918. In May 1918, Scott entered active duty at Fort Monroe, Virginia, as a member of the 2nd Trench Mortar Battalion. The battalion arrived in France in June 1918, and took part in combat with the U.S. IV Corps in the Toul sector and Thiaucourt zone. After the Armistice of November 11, 1918, ended the war, the 2nd TM Battalion took part in the post-war occupation of Germany as part of U.S. VI Corps.

Following the armistice, Scott enrolled in the artillery Officer Candidate School, which was located in Saumur. He received his commission as a second lieutenant of Field Artillery in May 1919 and departed for the United States soon afterwards. He arrived in New York City on June 6 and reported to Camp Mills, where he received his honorable discharge on June 13. Scott made use of his wartime experience in his acting career, including his training in horsemanship and the use of firearms.

=== After World War I ===
With his military career over Scott continued his education at Georgia Tech, where he was a member of the Kappa Alpha Order and set his sights on becoming an all-American football player. However a back injury prevented him from achieving this goal. Scott then transferred to the University of North Carolina, where he majored in textile engineering and manufacturing. He eventually dropped out and went to work as an accountant in the textile firm where his father, a CPA, was employed.

== Career ==
=== Stage and early film appearances ===
==== Early films ====
Around 1927, Scott developed an interest in acting and decided to make his way to Los Angeles and seek a career in the motion picture industry. Scott's father had become acquainted with Howard Hughes and provided a letter of introduction for his son to present to the eccentric millionaire film maker. Hughes responded by getting Scott a small part in a George O'Brien film called Sharp Shooters (1928). A print of the film survives in the UCLA Film and Television Archive.

In the next few years, Scott continued working as an extra and bit player in several films, including Weary River (1929) with Richard Barthelmess, The Far Call (1929), The Black Watch (1929) (directed by John Ford with John Wayne also uncredited) and uncredited as the Rider in The Virginian (1929) with Gary Cooper. Scott also served as Cooper's dialect coach in the film.

Scott was also uncredited on Dynamite (1929) directed by Cecil B. DeMille, and Ford's Born Reckless (1930).

=== Stage ===
On the advice of Cecil B. DeMille, Scott gained much-needed acting experience by performing in stage plays with the Pasadena Playhouse. His stage roles during this period include:

- A minister in Gentlemen Be Seated
- A butler in Nellie, the Beautiful Model
- Metellus Cimber in William Shakespeare's Julius Caesar
- Hector Malone in George Bernard Shaw's Man and Superman

Scott appeared in the play Under a Virginia Moon at the Vine Street Theatre in Hollywood in 1932. His performance garnered several screen test offers from the major movie studios. Scott eventually signed a seven-year contract with Paramount Pictures at a salary of US $400 per week (equivalent to $9,400 in 2025).

=== Movie debut ===
In between his Pasadena Playhouse days and Vine Street Theatre performance Scott made his film debut.

In 1931 Scott played his first leading role (with Sally Blane) in Women Men Marry (1931), a film, now apparently lost, made by a Poverty Row studio called Headline Pictures. He followed it with a supporting part in a Warner Bros. production starring George Arliss, A Successful Calamity (1932).

=== Paramount ===
==== Zane Grey apprenticeship ====
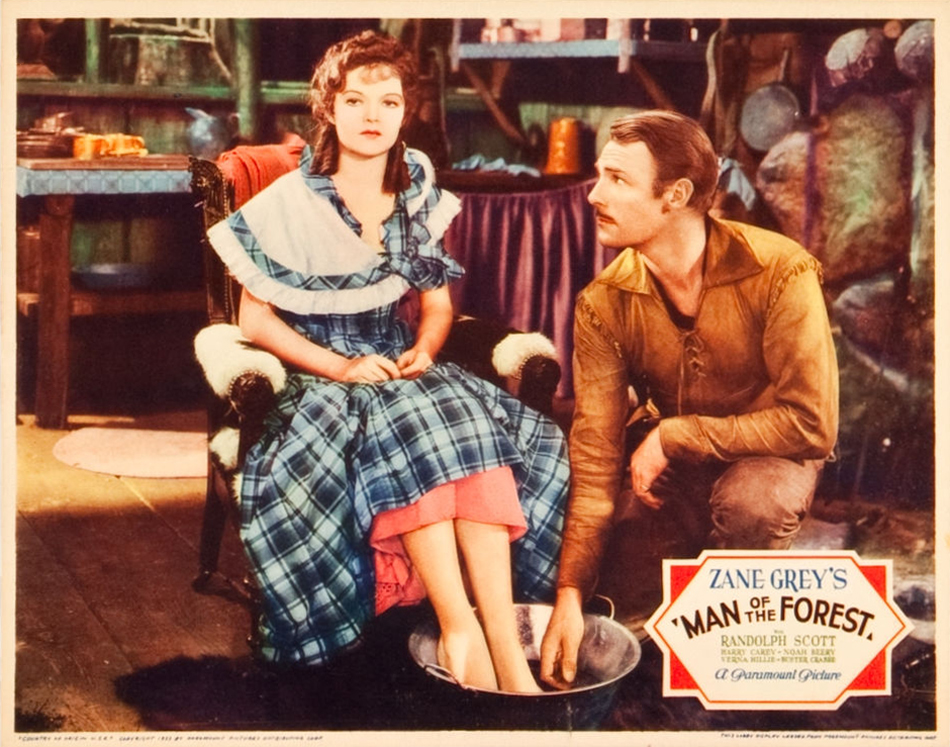
With Verna Hillie in Man of the Forest, 1933

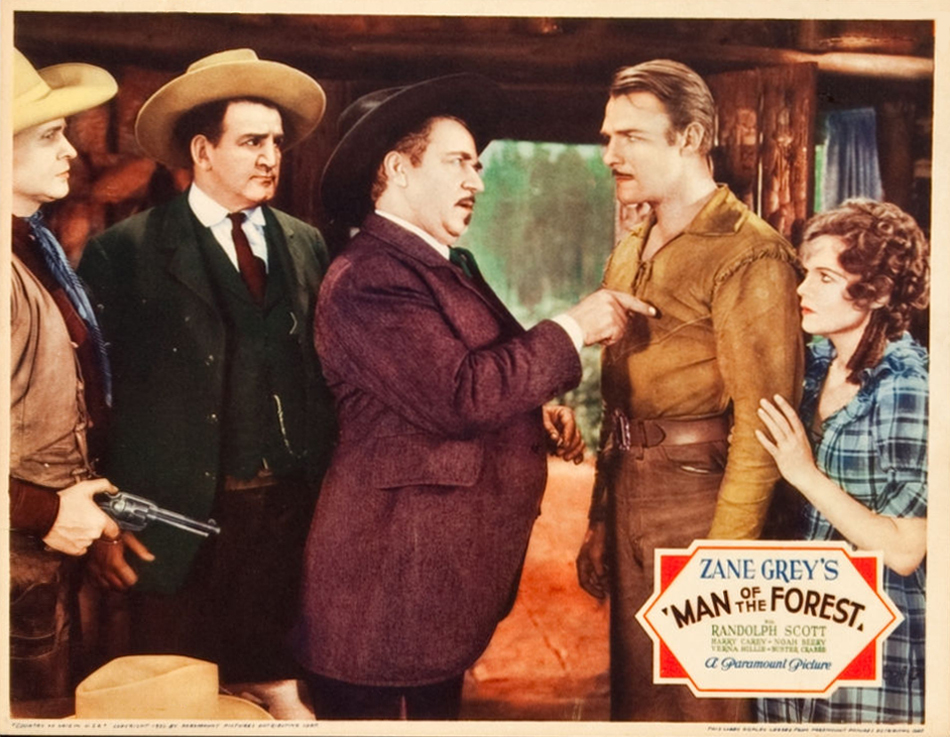
Barton MacLane, Tom Kennedy, Noah Beery Sr., Scott and Verna Hillie in Man of the Forest, 1933

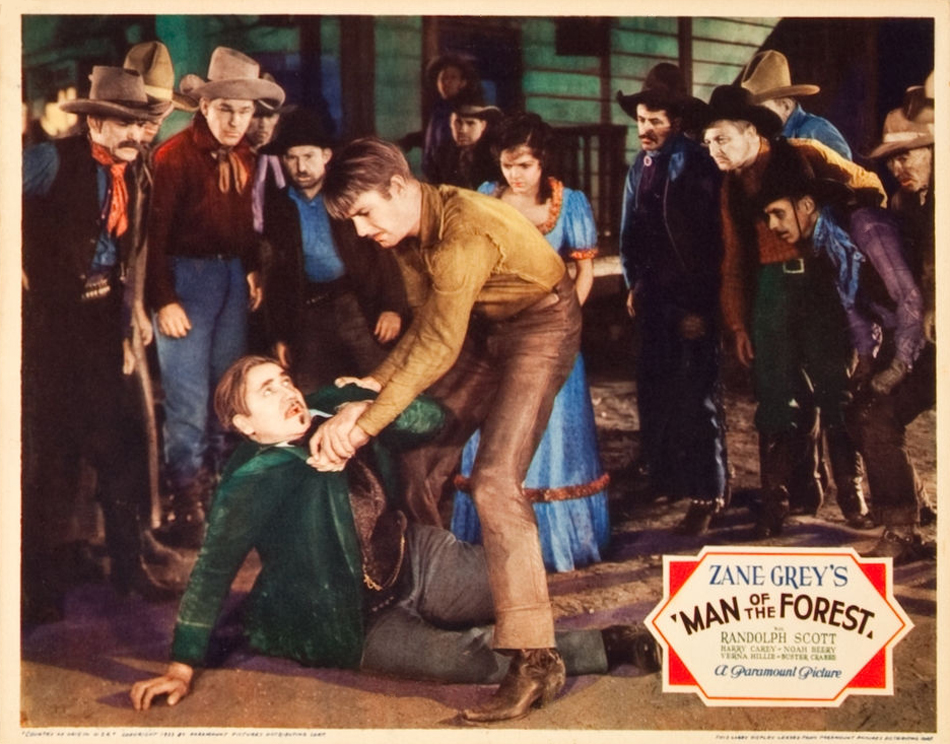
Noah Beery Sr. and Scott in Man of the Forest, 1933

Scott's first role under his new Paramount contract was a small supporting part in a comedy called Sky Bride (1932) starring Richard Arlen and Jack Oakie.

Following that, however, Paramount cast him as the lead in Heritage of the Desert (1932), which established him as a Western hero. As with Women Men Marry, Sally Blane was his leading lady. Henry Hathaway made his directorial debut with Heritage of the Desert. The film was popular and Scott went on to make ten "B" Western films loosely based on the novels of Zane Grey.

Many of the Grey adaptations were remakes of earlier silent films or retitled versions of recent movies. In an effort to save on production costs, Paramount used stock footage from the silent version and even hired some of the same actors, such as Raymond Hatton and Noah Beery, to reprise their roles, meaning that sometimes their ages would vary eight or more years during the same scene. For the 1933 films The Thundering Herd and Man of the Forest, Scott's hair was darkened and he sported a trim moustache so that he could easily be matched to footage of Jack Holt, the star of the silent versions.

In between his work in the Zane Grey Westerns, Paramount cast Scott in several non-Western roles, including "the other man" in Hot Saturday (1932), with Nancy Carroll and Cary Grant and the romantic male lead in Hello, Everybody! (1933). He made two horror movies, Murders in the Zoo (1933) with Lionel Atwill and Supernatural (1933) with Carole Lombard. After the Western Sunset Pass (1933), Paramount loaned Scott to Columbia for Cocktail Hour (1933), a minor romantic comedy opposite Bebe Daniels.

Back at Paramount, Scott acted in the Westerns Man of the Forest (1933) and To the Last Man (1933), both with Hathaway from Zane Grey novels and featuring Noah Beery Sr. as the villain. Scott was loaned to Monogram Pictures for Broken Dreams (1933) then was back with Hathaway for The Last Round-Up (1934).

Scott did three more Zane Grey Westerns without Hathaway: Wagon Wheels (1934) directed by Charles Barton (a remake of 1931's Fighting Caravans starring Gary Cooper), Home on the Range (1935) from Arthur Jacobson, and Rocky Mountain Mystery (1935) with Barton.

Film historian William K. Everson refers to the Zane Grey series as being "uniformly good". He also writes:

To the Last Man was almost a model of its kind, an exceptionally strong story of feuding families in the post-Civil War era, with a cast worthy of an "A" feature, excellent direction by Henry Hathaway, and an unusual climactic fight between the villain (Jack LaRue) and the heroine (Esther Ralston, in an exceptionally appealing performance). Sunset Pass… was not only one of the best but also one of the most surprising in presenting Randolph Scott and Harry Carey as heavies.

The Zane Grey series films were a boon for Scott, as they provided him with "an excellent training ground for both action and acting".

==== RKO and "A" Films ====
Paramount loaned Scott to RKO Radio Pictures to support Fred Astaire, Ginger Rogers and Irene Dunne in Roberta (1935), a hugely popular adaptation of the Broadway musical. RKO liked Scott and kept him on for Village Tale (1935), directed by John Cromwell, and She (1935), an adaptation of the novel by H. Rider Haggard from the makers of King Kong.

Scott went back to Paramount for So Red the Rose (1935) with Margaret Sullavan, then was reunited with Astaire and Rogers at RKO in Follow the Fleet (1936). It was another big hit. Scott was in a car drama at Paramount, And Sudden Death (1936), then was loaned to independent producer Edward Small, to play Hawkeye in another adventure classic, The Last of the Mohicans, adapted from the 1826 novel by James Fenimore Cooper. A big hit, it "gave Scott his first unqualified 'A' picture success as a lead."

At this point Paramount only put Scott in "A" films. He was a love interest for Mae West in Go West, Young Man (1936) and was reunited with Irene Dunne in a musical, High, Wide and Handsome (1937). This last film, a musical directed by Rouben Mamoulian, featured Scott in his "most ambitious performance."

Scott went to 20th Century Fox to play the romantic male lead in a Shirley Temple film, Rebecca of Sunnybrook Farm (1938). At Paramount he made a well budgeted Western The Texans (1938) with Joan Bennett; then he starred in The Road to Reno (1938) at Universal. Due to his Southern background, Scott was considered for the role of Ashley Wilkes in Gone with the Wind, but the part went to Leslie Howard.

=== 20th Century Fox ===
Scott's contract with Paramount ended and he signed with Fox. They put him in Jesse James (1939), a lavish, highly romanticized account of the famous outlaw (Tyrone Power) and his brother Frank (Henry Fonda). Scott was billed fourth as a sympathetic marshal. It was his first film in color.

Scott was reunited with Temple in Susannah of the Mounties (1939), Temple's last profitable film for Fox. Scott went over to Warner Bros to make Virginia City (1940), billed third after Errol Flynn and Miriam Hopkins, playing Flynn's antagonist, a Confederate officer, although the villain was played by Humphrey Bogart. There were frequent disputes on the set about script changes. But Michael Curtiz said that Scott tried to stay out of these arguments: "Randy Scott is a complete anachronism," said Curtiz. "He's a gentleman. And so far he's the only one I've met in this business..."

Scott was the "other man" in the Irene Dunne–Cary Grant vehicle My Favorite Wife (1940), a huge hit for RKO. For Universal, he starred with Kay Francis in When the Daltons Rode (1940). Back at Fox, Scott returned to Zane Grey country by co-starring with Robert Young in the Technicolor production Western Union, directed by Fritz Lang. Scott played a "good bad man" in this film and gave one of his finest performances. Bosley Crowther of The New York Times wrote:

Randolph Scott, who begins to look and act more and more like William S. Hart, herein shapes one of the truest and most appreciable characters of his career as the party's scout.

=== Universal ===
Scott's only true villain role was in Universal's The Spoilers (1942), an adaptation of Rex Beach's 1905 tale of the Alaskan gold rush also starring Marlene Dietrich and John Wayne. Its success led Universal to cast the trio again that same year in Pittsburgh. Scott was billed above Wayne in both films but Wayne played the hero in each.

=== World War II ===
Shortly after the United States entered World War II, Scott attempted to obtain an officer's commission in the Marines, but because of a back injury years earlier he was rejected. However, he did his part for the war effort by touring in a comedy act with Joe DeRita (who later became a member of the Three Stooges) for the Victory Committee showcases, and he also raised food for the government on a ranch that he owned.

In 1942 and 1943 Scott appeared in several war films, as well as The Desperadoes (1943), Columbia Pictures' first feature in Technicolor. The film was produced by Harry Joe Brown, with whom Scott would form a business partnership several years later.

=== Post–World War II career ===
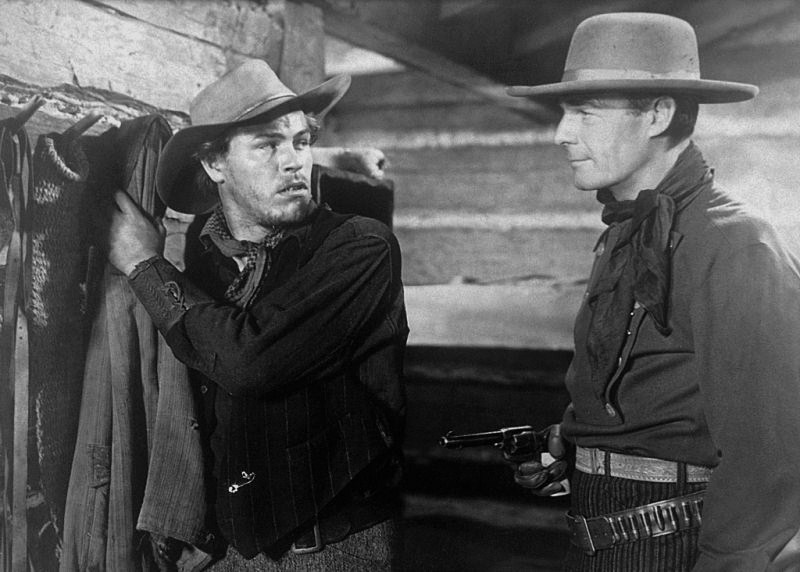
With Jack Lambert in Abilene Town, 1946

In 1946, after playing roles that had him wandering in and out of the saddle for many years, Scott appeared in Abilene Town, a UA release which cast him in what would become one of his classic images, the fearless lawman cleaning up a lawless town. The film "cemented Scott's position as a cowboy hero" and from this point on all but two of his starring films were Westerns.

The BFI Companion to the Western noted:

In his earlier Westerns ... the Scott persona is debonair, easy-going, graceful, though with the necessary hint of steel. As he matures into his fifties his roles change. Increasingly Scott becomes the man who has seen it all, who has suffered pain, loss, and hardship, and who has now achieved (but at what cost?) a stoic calm proof against vicissitude.

Scott renewed his acquaintance with producer Harry Joe Brown at Columbia with Gunfighters (1947). They began producing many of Scott's Westerns, including several that were shot in the two-color Cinecolor process. Their collaboration resulted in the film Coroner Creek (1948) with Scott as a vengeance-driven cowpoke who "predates the Budd Boetticher/Burt Kennedy heroes by nearly a decade," and The Walking Hills (1949), a modern-day tale of gold hunters directed by John Sturges.

They followed it with The Doolins of Oklahoma (1949), The Nevadan (1950), Santa Fe (1951), Man in the Saddle (1951), Hangman's Knot (1952), The Stranger Wore a Gun (1953) (shot in 3-D), The Bounty Hunter (1954),Ten Wanted Men (1955), and A Lawless Street (1955) (with Angela Lansbury.)

Scott also made Colt .45 (1950) at Warner Bros. where his salary was US$100,000 per picture (equal to $1,400,000 today).

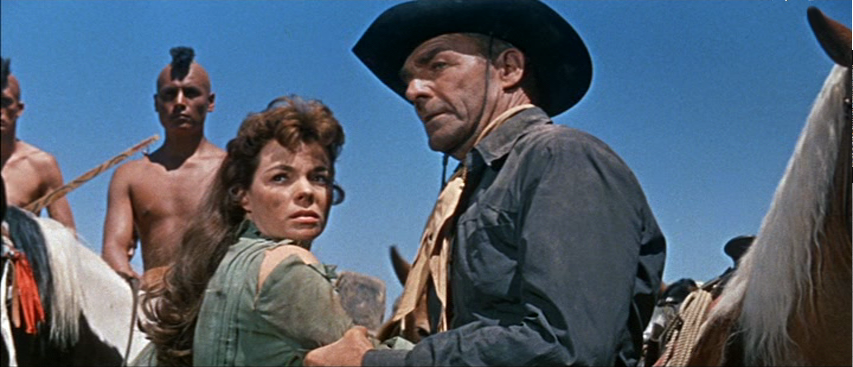
With Nancy Gates in Comanche Station, 1960

In 1955 screenwriter Burt Kennedy wrote the script Seven Men from Now, which was scheduled to be filmed by Batjac Productions with John Wayne as the film's star and Budd Boetticher as director. However, Wayne was committed to The Searchers with John Ford, and suggested Scott as his replacement. The resulting film did not make a great impact at the time but is now regarded as one of Scott's best and launched Scott and Boetticher into a successful collaboration on seven films.

Each film is independent and there are no shared characters or settings, but this set of films is often called the Ranown Cycle, for the production company run by Scott and Harry Joe Brown. Kennedy scripted four of them. In these films ...

Boetticher achieved works of great beauty, formally precise in structure and visually elegant, notably for their use of the distinctive landscape of the California Sierras. As the hero of these "floating poker games" (as Andrew Sarris calls them), Scott tempers their innately pessimistic view with quiet, stoical humour, as he matches wits against charming villains.

After 7th Cavalry (1956), Boetticher, Kennedy and Scott were reunited for The Tall T (1957), co-starring Richard Boone. The third in the series was Decision at Sundown (1957), although it was not written by Kennedy. The unofficial series continued with Buchanan Rides Alone (1958). Westbound (1959) is not considered part of the cycle, although Boetticher directed it. The last two, both written by Kennedy, were Ride Lonesome (1959) and Comanche Station (1960).

==== Last film: Ride the High Country ====
In 1962 Scott made his final film appearance in Ride the High Country. It was directed by Sam Peckinpah and co-starred Joel McCrea, an actor who had a screen image similar to Scott's and who also from the mid-1940s on devoted his career almost exclusively to Westerns.

Scott and McCrea's farewell Western is characterized by a nostalgic sense of the passing of the Old West; a preoccupation with the emotionality of male bonding and of the experiential "gap" between the young and the old; and the fearful evocation, in the form of the Hammonds (the villains in the film), of these preoccupations transmuted into brutal and perverse forms.

McCrea's role in the film is slightly larger than Scott's, although Scott was billed above McCrea.

== Later years ==
After Ride the High Country, Scott retired from film at the age of 64. A wealthy man, Scott had managed shrewd investments throughout his life, eventually accumulating a fortune worth a reputed $100 million, with holdings in real estate, gas, oil wells, and securities.

He and his wife Patricia continued to live in Beverly Hills. During his retirement years, he remained friends with Fred Astaire, with whom he attended Dodgers games. An avid golfer with a putting green in his yard, Scott was a member of the Bel Air Country Club, Los Angeles Country Club and Eldorado Country Club in Indian Wells, California. He also became friends with the Reverend Billy Graham. Scott was described by his son Christopher as a deeply religious man. He was an Episcopalian and the Scott family were members of All Saints' Episcopal Church in Beverly Hills and St. Peter's Episcopal Church in Charlotte, North Carolina.

Scott owned and co-designed Cresta Verde golf course in Corona, California.

== Personal life ==
Randolph Scott married twice. In 1936 he became the second husband of heiress Marion duPont, daughter of William du Pont Sr., and great-granddaughter of Éleuthère Irénée du Pont de Nemours, the founder of E. I. du Pont de Nemours and Company. Marion had previously married George Somerville, with Scott serving as best man at the wedding. The Scotts' marriage ended in divorce three years later. The union produced no children. Though divorced, she kept his last name nearly five decades until her death in 1983.

In 1944 Scott married the actress Patricia Stillman, who was 21 years his junior. In 1950 they adopted two children, Sandra and Christopher.

Randolph Scott and Cary Grant at "Bachelor Hall"

Although Scott achieved fame as a motion picture actor, he managed to keep a fairly low profile with his private life. Offscreen he was a good friend of Fred Astaire and Cary Grant. He met Grant on the set of Hot Saturday (1932), and shortly afterwards, they moved in together and shared a beach house in Malibu that became known as "Bachelor Hall". They lived there together off and on for 12 years; whether the relationship was romantic is a matter of biographical dispute. In 1944 Scott and Grant stopped living together, but they remained close friends for the rest of their lives.

Randolph Scott died of heart and lung ailments in 1987 at the age of 89 in Beverly Hills, California. He was interred at Elmwood Cemetery in Charlotte, North Carolina. He and his wife Patricia had been married for 43 years. She died in 2004 and is buried next to her husband. Their mid-century modern home was torn down in 2008. The Randolph Scott papers (which included photos, scrapbooks, notes, letters, articles and house plans) were left to the UCLA Library Special Collections.

== In popular culture ==
Scott's face reportedly was used as the model for the Oakland Raiders logo in 1960; the logo was re-designed in 1963. For more than 50 years, the iconic Raiders logo underwent only minor modifications and remained consistent with the original design.

He is caricatured in the Lucky Luke comic book album Le Vingtième de cavalerie (1965) as Colonel McStraggle.

In the movie Blazing Saddles (1974), Sheriff Bart asks townspeople to give him 24 hours to come up with a brilliant idea to save the town of Rock Ridge. They all say, "No!" Bart replies, "You'd do it for Randolph Scott." A hush falls over the crowd, then they begin whispering Scott's name. An unseen choir suddenly sings out "Randolph Scott!" as the townsfolk reverently remove their hats. They then agree to give Bart 24 hours.

In 1974, "Whatever Happened to Randolph Scott" was a hit single for The Statler Brothers.

Scott is the subject of a Rodney Dangerfield joke told on the 1981 NBC special The Stars Salute the President. In a veiled reference to Ronald Reagan (who was in attendance), Dangerfield muses how he is surprised he was invited to perform at the special, because he "voted for Randolph Scott" (both Reagan and Scott were actors in Westerns who later became involved in conservative politics).

== Awards ==
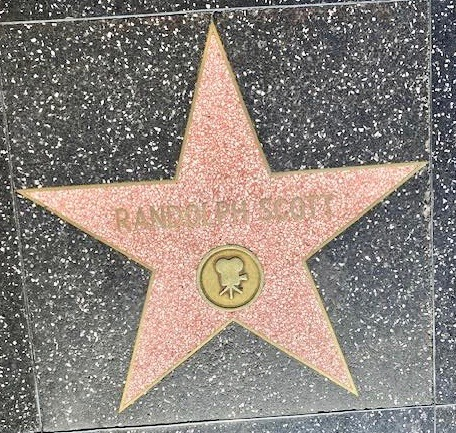
Scott's star on the Hollywood Walk of Fame.

In 1975, Scott was inducted into the Western Performers Hall of Fame at the National Cowboy & Western Heritage Museum in Oklahoma City, Oklahoma, United States. He also received an in Memoriam Golden Boot Award for his work in Westerns.

For his contribution to the motion picture industry, Scott has a star on the Hollywood Walk of Fame at 6243 Hollywood Blvd. In 1999 a Golden Palm Star on the Palm Springs, California, Walk of Stars was dedicated to him.

== Politics ==
Scott was an active Republican and a charter member of the Hollywood Republican Committee. In 1944, he attended the massive rally organized by David O. Selznick in the Los Angeles Coliseum in support of the Dewey-Bricker ticket as well as Governor Earl Warren of California, who would become Dewey's running mate in 1948. The gathering drew 93,000, with Cecil B. DeMille as the master of ceremonies and short speeches by Hedda Hopper and Walt Disney. Among those in attendance were Ann Sothern, Ginger Rogers, Adolphe Menjou, and Gary Cooper. Scott also supported Barry Goldwater in the 1964 United States presidential election and Ronald Reagan in the 1966 California gubernatorial election.
