= Decision at Sundown =

1957 film by Budd Boetticher

- Theatrical release poster
- Directed by: Budd Boetticher
- Screenplay by: Charles G. Lang
- Based on: Decision at Sundown; 1955 novel by Vernon L. Fluharty
- Produced by: Harry Joe Brown
- Starring: Randolph Scott
- Cinematography: Burnett Guffey
- Edited by: Al Clark
- Music by: Heinz Roemheld
- Color process: Technicolor
- Production companies: Producer-Actor Corporation; Scott-Brown Productions
- Distributed by: Columbia Pictures
- Release date: November 10, 1957
- Running time: 77 minutes
- Country: United States
- Language: English

Decision at Sundown is a 1957 American Western film directed by Budd Boetticher and starring Randolph Scott. It is one of seven Boetticher/Scott western collaborations, including Seven Men from Now, The Tall T, Buchanan Rides Alone, Westbound, Ride Lonesome, and Comanche Station.

Boetticher said this film and Westbound were the only mediocre films he made as part of the Ranown cycle.

== Plot ==
Bart Allison and his friend Sam ride into the town of Sundown. Bart has only one thing in mind: to seek revenge on Tate Kimbrough who he believes seduced and abandoned his wife Mary, which led her to kill herself. Tate has taken political and economic control of Sundown. The citizens yield to his influence out of fear and material interest.

The day that Bart arrives, Tate is preparing to marry Lucy Summerton, the "finest and prettiest young lady" in Sundown, according to the town's barber. To the disapproval of Lucy's father, Tate spends time with Ruby James, with whom he is romantically involved. Tate tells her to leave town now that he is marrying Lucy, but she insists on attending the wedding in the church. She sits in the front pew with the town's doctor, John Storrow. In the town's saloon, Bart refuses to have his drinks paid in honor of Tate Kimbrough's wedding.

Bart interrupts the ceremony and threatens to kill Tate, for what he did to Mary, before the day is out. Chased by the townsfolk, he and Sam find refuge in the livery stable. Lucy flees from the wedding, driving a wagon in her wedding dress, and refuses to continue with the ceremony until the situation is cleared up.

The doctor and Morley Chase, a local ranch owner, show some understanding of Bart's predicament. Dr Storrow goes to the livery stable to take care of Spanish, one of Kimbrough's wounded hired guns. He tells Bart about his resentment of Tate's bad influence in the town since he came to take it over. Mr. Summerton, Lucy's father, tries to talk Bart into accepting a deal proposed by Tate that he leave town free. He even suggests adding a tempting amount of money.

Lucy reconsiders her relationship with Tate, whose affairs with Ruby and Mary make her feel uncomfortable. She goes to the livery stable and tells Bart that maybe his deceased wife was not as faithful as he might have imagined, trying thus to reduce Bart's obsession with killing Tate. Bart throws her out but starts thinking. When Sam tries to confirm what Lucy said about Mary, Bart punches him, almost knocking him out. Sam is allowed to have lunch at the local restaurant, but Swede, the sheriff, shoots him in the back.

This killing contributes to the people's change of heart concerning Tate. Storrow stirs up people's consciences at the saloon. Morley Chase and his men take sides with Storrow and Bart and disarm some of Kimbrough's men.

The situation amounts to a showdown between the sheriff and Bart. Bart is faster on the draw and shoots the sheriff, in the process suffering a wound in the palm of his hand. While bandaging Bart's hand, Storrow tries to talk him out of a showdown with Tate Kimbrough, who thinks he can regain his power if he shoots Bart. On her side, Ruby tries to make Tate leave town but he goes down to the street to face Bart.

While Tate and Bart approach each other in the street, to everyone's surprise Ruby shoots Tate in the arm with a Winchester to wound him and save his life, forcing him to abandon the confrontation. Bart wants him to take his gun and resume the fight but Ruby tries to explain to him that his hate is not worth it since he "never had a wife". Storrow confirms her point, saying he has learned it from Sam. Ruby and the injured Tate withdraw and Bart lets it happen, finally accepting the bitter truth about Mary after three years. Ruby and Kimbrough leave the town in a buggy. Bart drowns his sorrow in the saloon and rejects the townspeople's friendly attitude, once more refusing to have his drinks paid. He rides out of the town, watched by Lucy and Dr Storrow, standing together.

== Cast ==
- Randolph Scott as Bart Allison
- John Carroll as Tate Kimbrough
- Karen Steele as Lucy Summerton
- Valerie French as Ruby James
- Noah Beery Jr. as Sam
- John Archer as Dr. John Storrow
- Andrew Duggan as Sheriff Swede Hansen
- James Westerfield as Otis, the bartender
- John Litel as Charles Summerton
- Ray Teal as Morley Chase
- Vaughn Taylor as Mr. Baldwin, the barber
- Richard Deacon as Reverend Zaron
- H. M. Wynant as Deputy Spanish
- Duke Fishman as Barfly/Townsman
- Bob Steele as Irv (uncredited)
- Abel Fernandez as Pete (uncredited)
- Guy Wilkerson as Abe (uncredited)

== Home media ==
In 2008, a DVD box set of five Budd Boetticher films starring Randolph Scott was released. Along with Decision at Sundown, the set includes Buchanan Rides Alone, Comanche Station, Ride Lonesome, and The Tall T.

== See also ==
- List of American films of 1957
