= Heinz Roemheld =

American musician

- Born: Heinrich Erich Roemheld; May 1, 1901; Milwaukee, Wisconsin, U.S.
- Died: February 11, 1985 (aged 83); Huntington Beach, California, U.S.
- Education: Milwaukee College of Music
- Occupation: Composer
- Spouse: Emeline Defnet (divorced)
- Children: 2
- Parent(s): Heinrich Roemheld (father); Fanny Rauterberg Roemheld (mother)

Heinz Roemheld (May 1, 1901 – February 11, 1985) was an American composer.

== Early life and career ==
Born Heinz Eric Roemheld in Milwaukee, Wisconsin, he was one of four children of German immigrant Heinrich Roemheld and his wife Fanny Rauterberg Roemheld. Heinrich was a pharmacist, but all the members of the family were musical. His brother Edgar Roemheld (1898–1964) became a conductor. His sister Irmgard Roemheld (1904–1995) became a well-known Milwaukee music teacher and radio broadcaster.

Roemheld was a child prodigy who began playing the piano at four. He graduated from the Milwaukee College of Music at 19 and performed in theaters to earn money to study piano in Europe. In 1920, he went to Berlin, where he studied with Hugo Kaun, Ferruccio Busoni, and Egon Petri. While there, he appeared in concert with the Berlin Philharmonic.

When he returned to America, Roemheld became involved in music for silent movies, both as a pianist and conductor. In 1925, he was sent back to Berlin as head of Universal Pictures theaters there but had to leave in 1929 due to the rise of Nazism.

Back in America, Roemheld moved to Los Angeles and became a prominent cinema composer. He scored some scenes in Gone with the Wind, including the burning of Atlanta, although he was not credited on-screen. In 1942, he won the Academy Award for Best Original Music Score for Yankee Doodle Dandy. Among the more than 400 other films for which he composed music were Gentleman Jim, The Lady From Shanghai, The Invisible Man, and Shine On, Harvest Moon.

After World War II, Roemheld returned to Germany to become Chief of the Film, Theatre, and Music Section of the Information Central Division of The American Armies in Europe. He continued writing for several major film studios until the late 1950s and, after briefly working in television, he retired in 1964 to concentrate on classical composition. He is best known for the song "Ruby" from the movie Ruby Gentry (1952), which has become a standard.

== Personal life ==
He married a former Miss Milwaukee, Emeline Defnet (1901–1980), from whom he was later divorced. They had two daughters, Mary Lou Roemheld, who was married for years to game show host Jack Narz, and Ann Roemheld, who married game show host Bill Cullen.

== Death ==
Roemheld died on February 11, 1985, at a convalescent home in Huntington Beach after contracting pneumonia three weeks earlier.

== Partial filmography ==
- The White Hell of Pitz Palu (1929)
- All Quiet on the Western Front (1930)
- The Czar of Broadway (1930)
- See America Thirst (1930)
- The Hunchback of Notre Dame (1931 reissue)
- Murders in the Rue Morgue (1932) (stock music, uncredited)
- Golden Harvest (1933)
- The Invisible Man (1933) (uncredited)
- Fashion Follies of 1934 (1934)
- One Exciting Adventure (1934)
- Housewife (1934)
- Bombay Mail (1934)
- The Man Who Reclaimed His Head (1934)
- Imitation of Life (1934)
- The Black Cat (1934)
- Midnight Alibi (1934)
- Merry Wives of Reno (1934) (uncredited)
- Ruggles of Red Gap (1935)
- Storm Over the Andes (1935)
- Mary Burns, Fugitive (1935)
- Werewolf of London (1935) (uncredited)
- The Girl from 10th Avenue (1935)
- Front Page Woman (1935)
- Dracula's Daughter (1936)
- Her Master's Voice (1936)
- Flash Gordon (serial, 1936)
- Three Smart Kids (1936)
- The Girl on the Front Page (1936)
- Stage Struck (1936)
- Times Square Playboy (1936)
- China Clipper (1936)
- It's Love I'm After (1937)
- Stand-In (1937)
- The Perfect Specimen (1937)
- I Met My Love Again (1938)
- Four's a Crowd (1938)
- Comet Over Broadway (1938)
- Nancy Drew, Reporter (1939)
- Gone with the Wind (1939) (uncredited)
- You Can't Get Away with Murder (1939)
- Invisible Stripes (1939)
- A Child is Born (1940)
- Brother Orchid (1940)
- No Time for Comedy (1940)
- The Man Who Talked Too Much (1940)
- Brother Rat and a Baby (1940)
- British Intelligence (1940)
- My Love Came Back (1940)
- Lady with Red Hair (1940)
- Four Mothers (1941)
- Strawberry Blonde (1941)
- Flight from Destiny (1941)
- Blues in the Night (1941)
- The Wagons Roll at Night (1941)
- Affectionately Yours (1941)
- Honeymoon for Three (1941)
- Always in My Heart (1942)
- The Male Animal (1942)
- Wild Bill Hickok Rides (1942) (uncredited)
- Yankee Doodle Dandy (1942)
- Gentleman Jim (1942)
- The Hard Way (1943)
- The Desert Song (1943)
- Make Your Own Bed (1944)
- Janie (1944)
- Shine On, Harvest Moon (1944)
- Too Young to Know (1945)
- O.S.S. (1946)
- Mr. Ace (1946)
- The Fabulous Joe (1947)
- Heaven Only Knows (1947)
- It Had to Be You (1947)
- Down to Earth (1947)
- Christmas Eve (1947)
- Curley (1947)
- The Flame (1947)
- The Lady from Shanghai (1947)
- On Our Merry Way (1948)
- Here Comes Trouble (1948)
- I, Jane Doe (1948)
- Station West (1948)
- Who Killed Doc Robbin (1948)
- The Girl from Manhattan (1948)
- The Fuller Brush Man (1948)
- My Dear Secretary (1948)
- Mr. Soft Touch (1949)
- Lucky Stiff (1949)
- Miss Grant Takes Richmond (1949)
- The Good Humor Man (1950)
- Kill the Umpire (1950)
- Rogues of Sherwood Forest (1950)
- The Fuller Brush Girl (1950)
- Valentino (1951)
- Chicago Calling (1952)
- The Big Trees (1952)
- Jack and the Beanstalk (1952)
- Loan Shark (1952)
- Three for Bedroom C (1952)
- Ruby Gentry (1952)
- The Moonlighter (1953)
- The Square Jungle (1955)
- Hell's Horizon (1955)
- There's Always Tomorrow (1956)
- The Tall T (1957)
- The Monster That Challenged the World (1957)
- Decision at Sundown (1957)
- Ride Lonesome (1959)
- Lad, A Dog (1962)
