= Charles Lawton Jr. =

American film and television cinematographer

- Born: April 6, 1904; Los Angeles, California, U.S.
- Died: July 11, 1965 (aged 61); Los Angeles, California, U.S.
- Occupation: Cinematographer
- Years active: 1937–1965

Charles Lawton Jr. (April 6, 1904 – July 11, 1965), nicknamed "Buddy", was an American film and television cinematographer. He has over one hundred credits to his name.

== Partial filmography ==
- My Dear Miss Aldrich (1937)
- Paradise for Three (1938)
- Nick Carter, Master Detective (1939)
- Within the Law (1939)
- Andy Hardy Meets Debutante (1940)
- Gold Rush Maisie (1940)
- Hullabaloo (1940)
- Free and Easy (1941)
- This Time for Keeps (1942)
- Joe Smith, American (1942)
- Fingers at the Window (1942)
- Young Ideas (1943)
- Brewster's Millions (1945)
- Blondie Knows Best (1946)
- The Lady from Shanghai (1947)
- The Black Arrow (1948)
- The Untamed Breed (1948)
- The Gallant Blade (1948)
- Tokyo Joe (1949)
- Mr. Soft Touch (1949)
- Shockproof (1949)
- Kill the Umpire (1950)
- The Fuller Brush Girl (1950)
- Mask of the Avenger (1951)
- Boots Malone (1952)
- Hangman's Knot (1952)
- All Ashore (1953)
- Let's Do It Again (1953)
- Three Hours to Kill (1954)
- They Rode West (1954)
- My Sister Eileen (1955)
- Jubal (1956)
- The Tall T (1957)
- 3:10 to Yuma (1957)
- The Last Hurrah (1958)
- The Gene Krupa Story (1959)
- The Wackiest Ship in the Army (1960)
- Comanche Station (1960)
- A Raisin in the Sun (1961)
- Two Rode Together (1961)
- 13 West Street (1962)
- Spencer's Mountain (1963)
- Ensign Pulver (1964)
- A Rage to Live (1965)
