= Arruza =

Arruza usually refers to Carlos Arruza, a famous bullfighter.

Arruza may also refer to:

- Arruza (film), a 1972 documentary film about Carlos Arruza
- Pedro Arruza, head football coach of the Randolph–Macon Yellow Jackets
