= Budd Boetticher =

American film director

- Born: Oscar Boetticher Jr. July 29, 1916; Chicago, Illinois, U.S.
- Died: November 29, 2001 (aged 85); Ramona, California, U.S.
- Occupation: Film director
- Years active: 1942–1985
- Spouses: Marian Forsythe Herr (m. 1938; div. 1946) Emily Erskine Cook (m. 1949; div. 1959) Debra Paget (m. 1960; div. 1961) Margo E. Jensen (m. 1969; div. 1971) Mary Chelde (m. 1971)
- Partner: Elsa Cárdenas (1962-1964)

Oscar Boetticher Jr. (/ˈbɛtɪkər/ BET-i-kər; July 29, 1916 – November 29, 2001), known as Budd Boetticher, was an American film director. He is best remembered for a series of low-budget Westerns he made in the late 1950s starring Randolph Scott.

== Early life ==
Boetticher was born in Chicago. His mother died in childbirth, and his father was killed in an accident shortly afterward. He was adopted by a wealthy couple, Oscar Boetticher Sr. (1867–1953) and Georgia (née Naas) Boetticher (1888–1955), and raised in Evansville, Indiana, along with his younger brother, Henry Edward Boetticher (1924–2004). He attended Culver Military Academy, where he became friends with Hal Roach Jr.

He was a star athlete at Ohio State University, until an injury ended his sports career. In 1939, he traveled to Mexico, where he learned bullfighting under Lorenzo Garza, Fermín Espinosa Saucedo, and Carlos Arruza.

== Career ==
=== Early films ===
Boetticher worked as a crew member on Of Mice and Men (1939) and A Chump at Oxford (1940). A chance encounter with Rouben Mamoulian landed him a job as technical advisor on Blood and Sand (1941). He stayed on in Hollywood working at Hal Roach Studios doing a variety of jobs.

=== Columbia Pictures ===
Boetticher received an offer to work at Columbia Pictures as an assistant director on The More the Merrier (1943). The studio liked his work, and he stayed to assist on Submarine Raider (1942), The Desperadoes (1943), Destroyer (1943), U-Boat Prisoner (1944), and Cover Girl (1944), promoted to first assistant director. Some of these were Columbia's most prestigious films and Boetticher was offered the chance to join the studio's directing program.

Boetticher's first credited film as director was a Boston Blackie film One Mysterious Night (1944). It was followed by other "B" movies: The Missing Juror (1944), Youth on Trial (1945), A Guy, a Gal and a Pal (1945), and Escape in the Fog (1945).

"They were terrible pictures", he remarked in 1979. "We had eight or ten days to make a picture. We had all these people who later became stars, or didn't, like George Macready and Nina Foch, and you never had anybody any good. I don't mean that they weren't good but they weren't then, and neither were we."

=== Military service ===
Boetticher was commissioned as an ensign in the U.S. Naval Photographic Science Laboratory. He made documentaries and service films, including The Fleet That Came to Stay (1945) and Well Done.

=== Eagle Lion and Monogram ===
Boetticher left Columbia. He directed some films for Eagle Lion, Assigned to Danger (1948) and Behind Locked Doors (1949).

At Monogram Pictures he directed Roddy McDowall in Black Midnight (1949) and Killer Shark (1950). In between, he made The Wolf Hunters (1949).

He began directing for television with Magnavox Theatre – a production of The Three Musketeers that was released theatrically in some markets as The Blade of the Musketeers.

=== Bullfighter and the Lady ===
Boetticher got his first big break when he was asked to direct Bullfighter and the Lady for John Wayne's production company, Batjac, based loosely on Boetticher's own adventures studying to be a matador in Mexico. It was the first film he signed as Budd Boetticher, rather than his given name, and it earned him an Oscar nomination for Best Original Story. The film was edited drastically without his consent, though, and his career again seemed on hold. (The film has since been restored by the UCLA Film Archive and the restored print is sometimes referred to by its working title, Torero.)

=== Universal-International ===
Boetticher signed a contract to direct for Universal-International, where he specialized in Westerns.

"I became a Western director because they thought I looked like one and they thought I rode better than anyone else," said Boetticher later. "And I didn't know anything about the West."

His films there included The Cimarron Kid (1952) with Audie Murphy; Bronco Buster (1952); Red Ball Express (1952), a World War II film; Horizons West (1952) with Robert Ryan; City Beneath the Sea (1953), a treasure-hunting film; Seminole (1953), a Western with Rock Hudson; The Man from the Alamo (1953) with Glenn Ford; Wings of the Hawk (1953) with Van Heflin; and East of Sumatra (1953) with Chandler and Quinn.

He started directing The Americano, an independent film with Ford, but quit. He returned to television with The Public Defender.

=== The Magnificent Matador ===
In 1955, he helmed another bullfighting drama, The Magnificent Matador, at 20th Century-Fox, which began his frequent collaboration with cinematographer Lucien Ballard. They followed it with a film noir, The Killer Is Loose (1956).

He also directed episodes of The Count of Monte Cristo.

=== Ranown Cycle ===
Boetticher finally achieved his major breakthrough when he teamed up with actor Randolph Scott and screenwriter Burt Kennedy to make Seven Men from Now (1956). It was the first of the seven films (last in 1960) that came to be known as the Ranown Cycle.

He was reunited with Scott and Kennedy on The Tall T (1957); they were joined by producer Harry Joe Brown, who would produce the six remaining films.

Boetticher directed the first three episodes of the TV series Maverick. He went back to working with Scott: Decision at Sundown (1957), Buchanan Rides Alone (1958) (not written by Kennedy), and Ride Lonesome (1959).

Westbound (1959) was made with Scott but without Kennedy or Brown. Comanche Station (1960) was made with Scott and Kennedy.

=== 1960s ===
Boetticher returned to television, directing episodes of Hong Kong, Dick Powell's Zane Grey Theatre, Death Valley Days, and The Rifleman. He did a feature, The Rise and Fall of Legs Diamond (1960). He directed the first three episodes of Maverick starring James Garner then had a fundamental disagreement with writer/producer Roy Huggins involving the lead character's dialogue and never directed the series again.

Boetticher spent most of the 1960s south of the border pursuing his obsession, the documentary of his friend, the bullfighter Carlos Arruza, turning down profitable Hollywood offers and suffering humiliation and despair to stay with the project, including sickness, bankruptcy and confinement in both jail and asylum (all of which is detailed in his autobiography When in Disgrace). Arruza was finally completed in 1968 and released in Mexico in 1971 and the US in 1972.

=== Return to Hollywood ===
Boetticher returned to Hollywood with the rarely seen A Time for Dying, a collaboration with Audie Murphy shot in 1969 and not released widely until 1982. He provided the story for Don Siegel's Two Mules for Sister Sara (1970).

In his later years, he was known for the documentary My Kingdom For... (1985) and his appearance as a judge in Robert Towne's Tequila Sunrise (1988), and he was still actively attempting to get his screenplay, A Horse for Mr. Barnum, made before his death in 2001. His wife Mary and he spent much of their later years traveling to film festivals around the world, especially in Europe. His last public appearance, less than three months before his death, was at Cinecon, a classic film festival held in Hollywood, California.

== Filmography ==
- Of Mice and Men (1939) – horse wrangler
- A Chump at Oxford (1940)- crew
- Blood and Sand (1941) – technical adviser
- Military Training (1941) (short) – assistant director
- Submarine Raider (1942) – uncredited director
- The More the Merrier (1943) – assistant director
- The Desperadoes (1943) – assistant director
- Destroyer (1943) – assistant director
- Cover Girl (1944) – assistant director
- The Girl in the Case (1944) – assistant director
- U-Boat Prisoner (1944) aka Dangerous Mists – uncredited
- One Mysterious Night (1944) aka Behind Closed Doors – director
- The Missing Juror (1944) – director
- Youth on Trial (1945) – director
- A Guy, a Gal and a Pal (1945) – director
- Escape in the Fog (1945) – director
- The Fleet that Came to Stay (1945) (documentary) – director
- Assigned to Danger (1948) – director
- Behind Locked Doors (1948) – director
- Black Midnight (1949) – director
- The Wolf Hunters (1949) – director
- Killer Shark (1950) – director
- The Maganvox Theater (1950) (TV series) – episode "The Three Musketeers" – director
- Bullfighter and the Lady (1951) – director, producer, story
- The Cimarron Kid (1952) – director
- Bronco Buster (1952) – director
- Red Ball Express (1952) – director
- Horizons West (1952) – director
- Seminole (1953) – director
- City Beneath the Sea (1953) – director
- The Man from the Alamo (1953) – director
- Wings of the Hawk (1953) – director
- East of Sumatra (1953) – director
- The Public Defender (1954) (TV series) – director
- The Magnificent Matador (1955) aka The Brave and the Beautiful – director, story
- Seven Men from Now (1956) – director
- The Killer Is Loose (1956) – director
- General Electric Summer Originals (1956) (TV series) – episode "Alias Mike Hecules" – director
- The Count of Monte Cristo (1956) (TV series) – episode "The Affair of the Three Napoleons" – director
- The Tall T (1957) – director
- Maverick (1957) – various episodes – director
- Decision at Sundown (1957) – director
- Buchanan Rides Alone (1958) – director
- Ride Lonesome (1959) – director, producer
- Westbound (1959) – director
- Comanche Station (1960) – director, producer
- Hong Kong (1960) (TV series)- episode "Colonel Cat" – director
- The Rise and Fall of Legs Diamond (1960) – director
- Dick Powell's Zane Grey Theater (1960–61) (TV series) – director of various episodes
- Death Valley Days (TV series) – episode "South of Horror Flats" – director
- The Rifleman (1961) (TV series) – episode "Stopover" – director
- A Time for Dying (1969) – director, writer
- Two Mules for Sister Sara (1970) – story only
- Arruza (1971) (documentary) – director, producer
- My Kingdom For... (1985) (documentary) – director, producer
- Tequila Sunrise (1988) – actor only
