= Ralph Dunn =

American actor (1900–1968)

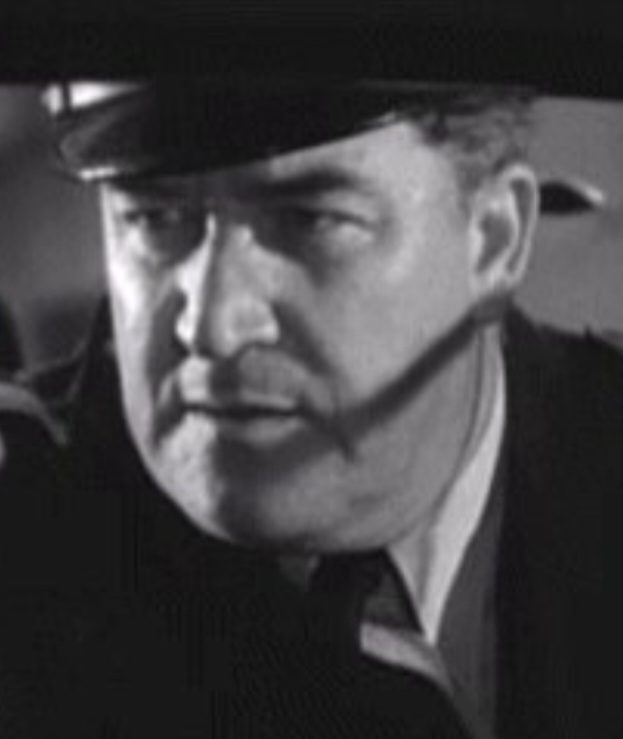
- Dunn in Dick Tracy vs. Cueball (1946)
- Born: May 23, 1900; Titusville, Pennsylvania, U.S.
- Died: February 19, 1968 (aged 67); Flushing, Queens, New York City, U.S.
- Occupation: Actor
- Years active: 1932–1967
- Spouse: Pat West (div. 1944)

Ralph Dunn (May 23, 1900 – February 19, 1968) was an American film, television, and stage actor.

== Early years ==
Dunn was born in Titusville, Pennsylvania, on May 23, 1900. His father was a veterinarian for the U.S. Army during World War I, and his mother was an actress. Dunn was enrolled briefly at the University of Pennsylvania, but left after a short time to join a vaudeville troupe.

== Career ==
Dunn's career began when he was a member of a minstrel show touring the southern United States. He performed on stage from 1920 to 1935, made more than 120 films in Hollywood from 1935 to 1950, and then returned to Broadway.

Dunn's Broadway credits included Once for the Asking (1963), Tenderloin (1960), Happy Town (1959), Make a Million (1958), The Pajama Game (1954), Room Service (1953), The Moon Is Blue (1951), An Enemy of the People (1950), and The Seventh Heart (1927).

Dunn acted in hundreds of minor feature-film roles and supporting appearances in two-reel comedies. He came to Hollywood during the early talkie era, beginning his film career with 1932's The Crowd Roars. He appeared in the Three Stooges comedy Mummy's Dummies, as well as Who Done It? and its remake, For Crimin' Out Loud.

Dunn kept busy into the 1960s, appearing in TV series such as Kitty Foyle, The Edge of Night and Norby, and films such as Black Like Me.

== Personal life ==
Dunn was married to actress Pat West. They divorced on May 12, 1944.

== Death ==
On February 19, 1968, Dunn died in Flushing, New York.

== Selected filmography ==
- The Crowd Roars (1932) - Racetrack Official (uncredited)
- Lady Killer (1933) - Monkey Delivery Man (uncredited)
- Stranded (1935) - Bridge Worker (uncredited)
- Bullets or Ballots (1936) - Policeman Getting Papers from Fire (uncredited)
- Public Enemy's Wife (1936) - Cop (uncredited)
- China Clipper (1936) - Plane Announcer at Miami Airport (uncredited)
- Down the Stretch (1936) - Race Starter (uncredited)
- Cain and Mabel (1936) - Diner Behind Reilly (uncredited)
- Valiant Is the Word for Carrie (1936) - G-Man (uncredited)
- Legion of Terror (1936) - Detective (uncredited)
- Fugitive in the Sky (1936) - First Radio Announcer (uncredited)
- Sing Me a Love Song (1936) - Store Cashier (uncredited)
- Girl Overboard (1937) - Motorcycle Officer (uncredited)
- The Great O'Malley (1937) - Police Stenographer in Hospital (uncredited)
- Penrod and Sam (1937) - Joe (uncredited)
- Marked Woman (1937) - Court Clerk at 1st trial (uncredited)
- Night Key (1937) - ABC Delivery Garageman-Thug (uncredited)
- Melody for Two (1937) - Radio Station Official (uncredited)
- The Go Getter (1937) - Officer on the Macon (uncredited)
- San Quentin (1937) - Head Cell Block Guard (uncredited)
- Kid Galahad (1937) - Reporter at Banquet (uncredited)
- The Singing Marine (1937) - Marine in Marine Grill (uncredited)
- Marry the Girl (1937) - G-Man (uncredited)
- White Bondage (1937) - Defense Attorney (uncredited)
- Reported Missing (1937) - McNamara (uncredited)
- One Mile from Heaven (1937) - Doorman (uncredited)
- Dangerously Yours (1937) - Detective (uncredited)
- The Game That Kills (1937) - Detective
- Hot Water (1937) - Policeman (uncredited)
- The Wrong Road (1937) - Convict (uncredited)
- Alcatraz Island (1937) - Metal Detector Guard (uncredited)
- Submarine D-1 (1937) - Sailor Who Smokes (uncredited)
- Big Town Girl (1937) - Trooper (uncredited)
- Borrowing Trouble (1937) - Cop (uncredited)
- City Girl (1938) - Mac, Policeman (uncredited)
- The Patient in Room 18 (1938) - Eldar Hotel Clerk (uncredited)
- A Slight Case of Murder (1938) - Third Policeman (uncredited)
- King of the Newsboys (1938) - Racetrack Guard (uncredited)
- Mr. Moto's Gamble (1938) - Detective (uncredited)
- Over the Wall (1938) - Prison Guard (uncredited)
- Island in the Sky (1938) - Police Sergeant (uncredited)
- Accidents Will Happen (1938) - Court Clerk (uncredited)
- Romance on the Run (1938) - Patrolman (uncredited)
- Numbered Woman (1938)
- Alexander's Ragtime Band (1938) - Army Captain (uncredited)
- Speed to Burn (1938) - Radio Car Policeman (uncredited)
- Prison Break (1938) - Detective (uncredited)
- Gateway (1938) - Guard (uncredited)
- Come On, Leathernecks! (1938) - Capt. Niles (uncredited)
- Tenth Avenue Kid (1938) - Detective Egan
- Billy the Kid Returns (1938) - Angry Man (uncredited)
- Personal Secretary (1938) - Cab Driver (uncredited)
- Garden of the Moon (1938) - Fred - Hotel Detective (uncredited)
- Time Out for Murder (1938) - Brady - Policeman (uncredited)
- Straight Place and Show (1938) - Bartender (uncredited)
- Five of a Kind (1938) - Policeman (uncredited)
- Red Barry (1938, Serial) - Transfer Truck Driver (uncredited)
- The Storm (1938) - Joe - Wireless Operator (uncredited)
- Storm Over Bengal (1938) - Soldier (uncredited)
- Next Time I Marry (1938) - Kennel Guard (uncredited)
- Newsboys' Home (1938) - Slugger (uncredited)
- King of the Underworld (1939) - First Policeman (uncredited)
- Scouts to the Rescue (1939, Serial) - Henchman Pug O'Toole
- Risky Business (1939) - Bogus Policeman (uncredited)
- Tail Spin (1939) - Mechanic (uncredited)
- The Lone Ranger Rides Again (1939, Serial) - Bart Dolan
- Sergeant Madden (1939) - Policeman in 1919 (uncredited)
- Winner Take All (1939) - Pete Magee - Waiter Applicant (uncredited)
- Mr. Moto in Danger Island (1939) - Cop with McGurk (uncredited)
- Blind Alley (1939) - Trooper Cronin (uncredited)
- The Return of the Cisco Kid (1939) - Guard (uncredited)
- Rose of Washington Square (1939) - Officer (uncredited)
- Boy Friend (1939) - Guard (uncredited)
- Mr. Moto Takes a Vacation (1939) - Police Guard (uncredited)
- Indianapolis Speedway (1939) - Racetrack Official (uncredited)
- Waterfront (1939) - First Detective (uncredited)
- Behind Prison Gates (1939) - Evans (uncredited)
- I Stole a Million (1939) - Bartender (uncredited)
- Desperate Trails (1939) - Henchman Lon
- Smashing the Money Ring (1939) - Dave - Convict Custodian on Train (uncredited)
- Beware Spooks! (1939) - Police Sergeant Following Gifford (uncredited)
- One Hour to Live (1939) - Heavy
- Blondie Brings Up Baby (1939) - Police Desk Sergeant (uncredited)
- Allegheny Uprising (1939) - Briggs - Carlisle Jail Turnkey (uncredited)
- Another Thin Man (1939) - Baggage Man (uncredited)
- The Hunchback of Notre Dame (1939) - Soldier (uncredited)
- Invisible Stripes (1939) - Doorman (uncredited)
- The Green Hornet (1940, Serial) - Andy - Thug (uncredited)
- The Man Who Wouldn't Talk (1940) - Guard (uncredited)
- His Girl Friday (1940) - Plainclothesman (uncredited)
- The Grapes of Wrath (1940) - Deputy (uncredited)
- The Fighting 69th (1940) - Medical Captain (uncredited)
- The Saint's Double Trouble (1940) - Police Sergeant (uncredited)
- Castle on the Hudson (1940) - Court Clerk Reading Verdict (uncredited)
- Double Alibi (1940) - First Police Dispatcher (uncredited)
- Johnny Apollo (1940) - Guard (uncredited)
- An Angel from Texas (1940) - 'General' in the Play (uncredited)
- I Can't Give You Anything But Love, Baby (1940) - Policeman Joe (uncredited)
- Girl in 313 (1940) - Det. Berner
- Phantom Raiders (1940) - Port Policeman (uncredited)
- New Moon (1940) - Bondsman (uncredited)
- Sailor's Lady (1940) - Shore Patrol (uncredited)
- You're Not So Tough (1940) - Valley Truck Driver (uncredited)
- We Who Are Young (1940) - 2nd Motorcycle Policeman (uncredited)
- Son of Roaring Dan (1940) - Deputy (uncredited)
- Brigham Young (1940) - Jury Foreman
- Argentine Nights (1940) - Purser (uncredited)
- Dr. Kildare Goes Home (1940) - Motorcycle Cop (uncredited)
- Public Deb No. 1 (1940) - Policeman (uncredited)
- Margie (1940) - Steamfitter (uncredited)
- Diamond Frontier (1940) - Attendant (uncredited)
- So You Won't Talk (1940) - Police Lieutenant (uncredited)
- Street of Memories (1940) - Cop (uncredited)
- Gallant Sons (1940) - Deputy with Charlie (uncredited)
- Trail of the Vigilantes (1940) - Deputy Sheriff (uncredited)
- Murder Over New York (1940) - Cop (uncredited)
- Michael Shayne, Private Detective (1940) - First Bartender (uncredited)
- The San Francisco Docks (1940) - Guard (uncredited)
- Tall, Dark and Handsome (1941) - Store Detective (uncredited)
- Mr. & Mrs. Smith (1941) - Cop (uncredited)
- Western Union (1941) - Work Seeker (uncredited)
- Blonde Inspiration (1941) - Policeman (uncredited)
- Sleepers West (1941) - Fireman Gibbons (uncredited)
- Dead Men Tell (1941) - Homicide Desk Sergeant (uncredited)
- The Lady from Cheyenne (1941) - Mayor Barney Davies, Cork's Henchman (uncredited)
- The Big Boss (1941) - Detective (uncredited)
- The Cowboy and the Blonde (1941) - Studio Gateman (uncredited)
- In the Navy (1941) - Cop Who Gives Pomeroy a Ticket (uncredited)
- Accent on Love (1941) - Policeman (uncredited)
- Manpower (1941) - Man Calling Sweeney (uncredited)
- World Premiere (1941) - Pinkerton Guard (uncredited)
- Sun Valley Serenade (1941) - Customs Officer
- We Go Fast (1941) - Policeman Mulligan (uncredited)
- Two Latins from Manhattan (1941) - Federal Agent
- International Lady (1941) - Don
- I Wake Up Screaming (1941) - Detective (uncredited)
- The Corsican Brothers (1941) - Messenger - Arturo's Steward (uncredited)
- No Hands on the Clock (1941) - Policeman (uncredited)
- Confessions of Boston Blackie (1941) - Police Officer McCarthy (uncredited)
- Pacific Blackout (1941) - Cop (uncredited)
- Tillie the Toiler (1941) (uncredited)
- Blondie Goes to College (1942) - Joe, the Second Motorcycle Policeman (uncredited)
- Jail House Blues (1942) - Toady (uncredited)
- Sing Your Worries Away (1942) - Detective Burke (uncredited)
- Reap the Wild Wind (1942) - 'Jubilee' Lookout (uncredited)
- True to the Army (1942) - Officer (uncredited)
- Ship Ahoy (1942) - Agent Grimes (uncredited)
- Saboteur (1942) - Second FBI Agent at Mason's House (uncredited)
- Fingers at the Window (1942) - Policeman outside Clinic (uncredited)
- Moontide (1942) - Policeman
- Twin Beds (1942) - Detective (uncredited)
- You're Telling Me (1942) - Doorman (uncredited)
- Syncopation (1942) - Police Officer (uncredited)
- Grand Central Murder (1942) - Policeman (uncredited)
- The Big Shot (1942) - Guard Slocum (uncredited)
- A-Haunting We Will Go (1942) - Officer (uncredited)
- The Talk of the Town (1942) - Cop on Stairs (uncredited)
- Just Off Broadway (1942) - Police Lieutenant (uncredited)
- My Sister Eileen (1942) - Griswald - Policeman (uncredited)
- Henry Aldrich, Editor (1942) - Policeman at Drug Store (uncredited)
- Get Hep to Love (1942) - Policeman Making Bet (uncredited)
- Street of Chance (1942) - Fireman (uncredited)
- The Navy Comes Through (1942) - Cop Bringing Sampier (uncredited)
- I Married a Witch (1942) - First Prison Guard (uncredited)
- Boston Blackie Goes Hollywood (1942) - Police Sergeant (uncredited)
- Wrecking Crew (1942) - Bartender (uncredited)
- My Heart Belongs to Daddy (1942) - Policeman Outside Theater (uncredited)
- Lucky Jordan (1942) - Army Guard (uncredited)
- Strictly in the Groove (1942) - Big Boy
- A Night to Remember (1942) - Henderson (uncredited)
- Mug Town (1942) - Cop (uncredited)
- They Got Me Covered (1943) - Cop at Lincoln Memorial (uncredited)
- Hello, Frisco, Hello (1943) - Waiter (uncredited)
- Hangmen Also Die! (1943) - Czech Policeman (uncredited)
- The Falcon Strikes Back (1943) - Motorcycle Policeman (uncredited)
- He Hired the Boss (1943) - Carter, FBI Man (uncredited)
- Dr. Gillespie's Criminal Case (1943) - Tracy - Prison Guard (uncredited)
- Action in the North Atlantic (1943) - Quartermaster (uncredited)
- All by Myself (1943) - Hotel Detective (uncredited)
- Pilot No. 5 (1943) - Deputy Throwing Tear Gas (uncredited)
- Adventures of the Flying Cadets (1943, Serial) - Drucke - Galt's Lead Guard [Chs. 10-13] (uncredited)
- Always a Bridesmaid (1943) - Sam (uncredited)
- Thank Your Lucky Stars (1943) - Marty (uncredited)
- My Kingdom for a Cook (1943) - Motor Policeman (uncredited)
- Government Girl (1943) - FBI Man (uncredited)
- Minesweeper (1943) - Bindlestiff in Boxcar (uncredited)
- Moonlight in Vermont (1943) - Taxicab Driver (uncredited)
- Tornado (1943) - Miner (uncredited)
- Phantom Lady (1944) - Worker (uncredited)
- The Whistler (1944) - Cop at Car Accident (uncredited)
- Hey, Rookie (1944) - Sergeant (uncredited)
- Up in Mabel's Room (1944) - Air Raid Warden (uncredited)
- Follow the Boys (1944) - Loomis (uncredited)
- Gambler's Choice (1944) - Police Sgt. Lonergan (uncredited)
- This Is the Life (1944) - Cop (uncredited)
- Roger Touhy, Gangster (1944) - Patrolman (uncredited)
- The Hairy Ape (1944) - Head Guard (uncredited)
- U-Boat Prisoner (1944) - American Naval Officer (uncredited)
- Wilson (1944) - Senator Robert La Follette (uncredited)
- Gypsy Wildcat (1944) (uncredited)
- In Society (1944) - Policeman at Pottery Shop (uncredited)
- Ever Since Venus (1944) - Policeman (uncredited)
- Dark Mountain (1944) - Chief Sanford
- Strange Affair (1944) - Mike McCafferty - Doorman (uncredited)
- Laura (1944) - Fred Callahan (uncredited)
- The Woman in the Window (1944) - Traffic Cop (uncredited)
- Bowery to Broadway (1944) - Cop (uncredited)
- The Princess and the Pirate (1944) - Murderous Pirate (uncredited)
- Murder, My Sweet (1944) - Detective (uncredited)
- Hollywood Canteen (1944) - Studio Gate Guard (uncredited)
- Together Again (1944) - Policeman (uncredited)
- Salty O'Rourke (1945) - Guard at Jewelry Store (uncredited)
- Escape in the Fog (1945) - Police Desk Sergeant (uncredited)
- Circumstantial Evidence (1945) - Cleary - the Cop
- Where Do We Go from Here? (1945) (uncredited)
- Wonder Man (1945) - Cop (uncredited)
- Conflict (1945) - Roberts - Highway Patrolman (uncredited)
- Penthouse Rhythm (1945) - Policeman (uncredited)
- Within These Walls (1945) - Pearson
- Along Came Jones (1945) - Cotton (uncredited)
- Anchors Aweigh (1945) - Hollywood Bowl Cop (uncredited)
- The Falcon in San Francisco (1945) - Arresting Policeman (uncredited)
- Love, Honor and Goodbye (1945) - Detective
- Senorita from the West (1945) - Man (uncredited)
- Hold That Blonde (1945) - Radio Cop (uncredited)
- Saratoga Trunk (1945) - Engineer (uncredited)
- An Angel Comes to Brooklyn (1945) - Sgt. O'Rourke
- Dick Tracy (1945) - Det. Manning (uncredited)
- Scarlet Street (1945) - First Policeman in Park (uncredited)
- Because of Him (1946) - Cop (uncredited)
- Deadline at Dawn (1946) - Captain Dill (uncredited)
- The Bandit of Sherwood Forest (1946) - Castle Guard (uncredited)
- Little Giant (1946) - Passenger in Lower Berth #6 (uncredited)
- From This Day Forward (1946) - Bailiff (uncredited)
- Murder Is My Business (1946) - Detective Pete Rafferty
- The Kid from Brooklyn (1946) - Sullivan's Handler (uncredited)
- Blondie's Lucky Day (1946) - 1st Cop (uncredited)
- The Truth About Murder (1946) - Police Detective Faber (uncredited)
- The Dark Corner (1946) - Policeman in Galleries (uncredited)
- Larceny in Her Heart (1946) - Det. Sgt. Pete Rafferty
- The Man Who Dared (1946) - Policeman John Ferris (uncredited)
- The Walls Came Tumbling Down (1946) - Policeman (uncredited)
- Step by Step (1946) - Patrol Car Cop (uncredited)
- Big Town (1946) - Mac, a Cop (uncredited)
- Shadowed (1946) - Policeman Ed (uncredited)
- Sister Kenny (1946) - Brisbane Policeman (uncredited)
- Gas House Kids (1946) - Detective O'Hara
- Genius at Work (1946) - Lt. Gilley
- The Strange Woman (1946) - Lumberjack (uncredited)
- Nobody Lives Forever (1946) - Ben, Watchman / Henchman (uncredited)
- Dick Tracy vs. Cueball (1946) - Policeman (uncredited)
- Lady Chaser (1946) - Brady
- Till the Clouds Roll By (1946) - Moving Man (uncredited)
- Gallant Bess (1946) - Tractor Chief Petty Officer (uncredited)
- Boston Blackie and the Law (1946) - Bank Guard (uncredited)
- Lady in the Lake (1946) - Sergeant (uncredited)
- California (1947) - Man (uncredited)
- Nora Prentiss (1947) - New York Detective (uncredited)
- The Beginning or the End (1947) - Guard (uncredited)
- The Michigan Kid (1947) - Cavalryman (uncredited)
- Undercover Maisie (1947) - Cop (uncredited)
- The Ghost Goes Wild (1947) - Policeman (uncredited)
- Lost Honeymoon (1947) - Truck Driver (uncredited)
- Three on a Ticket (1947) - Inspector Pete Rafferty
- Buck Privates Come Home (1947) - Ed - Guard on Midget Car (uncredited)
- For the Love of Rusty (1947) - Policeman (uncredited)
- Too Many Winners (1947) - Det. Peter Rafferty
- Possessed (1947) - Cable Car Motorman (uncredited)
- Swing the Western Way (1947) - Truck Driver (uncredited)
- Heartaches (1947) - Police Detective (uncredited)
- I Wonder Who's Kissing Her Now (1947) - Stagehand (uncredited)
- Deep Valley (1947) - Deputy (uncredited)
- The Secret Life of Walter Mitty (1947) - Policeman (uncredited)
- News Hounds (1947) - 'Dutch' Miller
- Dragnet (1947) - Police Sgt. Martin
- Merton of the Movies (1947) - Union Officer in Civil War Film (uncredited)
- The Fabulous Texan (1947) - Gratton (uncredited)
- Road to Rio (1947) - Meat Delivery Foreman (uncredited)
- The Treasure of the Sierra Madre (1948) - Flophouse Bum (uncredited)
- My Girl Tisa (1948) - Attendant (uncredited)
- The Big Clock (1948) - Guard (uncredited)
- Adventures in Silverado (1948) - Townsman (uncredited)
- April Showers (1948) - Frank - Bayside Hotel Bartender (uncredited)
- King of the Gamblers (1948) - Cassidy
- Fury at Furnace Creek (1948) - Wagon Master (uncredited)
- Fighting Father Dunne (1948) - Workman (uncredited)
- Jinx Money (1948) - Jake 'Cold Deck' Shapiro
- Train to Alcatraz (1948) - U.S. Marshal Mark Stevens
- Canon City (1948) - Convict Blacksmith
- The Babe Ruth Story (1948) - Babe Ruth's Father (uncredited)
- Lady at Midnight (1948) - Al Garrity
- The Golden Eye (1948) - Jim. Driscoll
- They Live by Night (1948) - Policeman (uncredited)
- In This Corner (1948) - Gus
- The Strange Mrs. Crane (1948) - Detective Who Arrests Barbara (uncredited)
- Incident (1948) - Bugs
- One Sunday Afternoon (1948) - Charlie Brown - Policeman (uncredited)
- Force of Evil (1948) - Policeman #8 (uncredited)
- Miss Mink of 1949 (1949) - Mr. McKelvey (uncredited)
- Homicide (1949) - Dept. of Employment Clerk (uncredited)
- Home in San Antone (1949) - Cop at Road Block (uncredited)
- The Lost Tribe (1949) - Capt. Rawlins
- Mr. Soft Touch (1949) - Tollgate Policeman (uncredited)
- The Fighting Kentuckian (1949) - River Man (uncredited)
- Mary Ryan, Detective (1949) - Policeman (uncredited)
- Key to the City (1950) - Cop with Drunk (uncredited)
- The Secret Fury (1950) - Police Sgt. McCafferty (uncredited)
- Singing Guns (1950) - Traveler
- The Great Plane Robbery (1950) - Police Inspector Bruce
- Kill the Umpire (1950) - Electrician (uncredited)
- The Asphalt Jungle (1950) - Policeman (uncredited)
- The Admiral Was a Lady (1950) - Mr. Bimble - Private Detective (uncredited)
- No Way Out (1950) - Sam (uncredited)
- Surrender (1950) - Jailer Frank (uncredited)
- The Enforcer (1951) - Sgt. James Dolan (uncredited)
- Abbott and Costello Meet the Invisible Man (1951) - Motorcycle Cop (uncredited)
- The Lemon Drop Kid (1951) - Racetrack Policeman (uncredited)
- A Place in the Sun (1951) - Policeman (uncredited)
- Government Agents vs. Phantom Legion (1951, Serial) - Patrolman McGee [Ch. 3] (uncredited)
- Taxi (1953) - Rafferty (uncredited)
- Crowded Paradise (1956)
- The Pajama Game (1957) - Myron Hasler
- From the Terrace (1960) - D.D. Jones (uncredited)
- Black Like Me (1964) - Priest
