= One Mysterious Night =

1944 film by Budd Boetticher

- Directed by: Budd Boetticher
- Written by: Jack Boyle (character); Paul Yawitz
- Produced by: Ted Richmond
- Starring: Chester Morris; Janis Carter; William Wright
- Cinematography: L. William O'Connell
- Edited by: Al Clark
- Music by: Paul Sawtell
- Production company: Columbia Pictures
- Distributed by: Columbia Pictures
- Release date: October 21, 1944
- Running time: 61 minutes
- Country: United States
- Language: English

One Mysterious Night is a 1944 crime film, the seventh in a Columbia Pictures series of fourteen starring Chester Morris as reformed crook Boston Blackie. It was preceded by The Chance of a Lifetime and followed by Boston Blackie Booked on Suspicion. Blackie is called upon to recover a stolen diamond.

The film is noteworthy as the directorial debut of Budd Boetticher, though he is credited under his real name, Oscar Boetticher Jr. He had been working at Columbia as an assistant director on such films as The Desperadoes and Cover Girl. He had been called in to help complete films but called this his "first real picture".

He helmed four more B-pictures before leaving the studio in 1945.

== Plot ==
The Blue Star of the Nile is stolen from an exhibition guarded by the police under Inspector Farraday. Under intense pressure from the police commissioner to recover the diamond, Farraday tells reporters, among them Dorothy Anderson, that he is sure Boston Blackie is responsible. However, he does not really believe that; it is only a ruse. When Blackie walks into Farraday's office, the inspector is so desperate he deputizes his old nemesis to get the jewel back, using his own methods.

Blackie is certain the robbers had inside help. He finds a wad of gum under some of the furniture at the exhibit hall; it still bears the impression of the diamond. Blackie targets George Daley, the assistant manager, especially after he learns that George had recently bought a large amount of gum. He gets sidetracked when Anderson recognizes him and has him arrested, but Farraday soon lets him out the back way.

Daley's sister Eileen finds out that her brother is involved with thieves Paul Martens and Matt Healy, and that he later hid the diamond in her purse. She persuades him to give the jewel to Blackie. However, his former partners show up just after he meets Blackie. In the ensuing scuffle, they kill Daley, and kidnap Blackie and his sidekick, "the Runt". The crooks figure that, with Blackie missing and unable to clear himself, he will be suspected of both the robbery and the murder. Indeed, Farraday begins to believe just that.

Blackie tells his captors that what they have is a fake that he intended to switch with the real diamond, supposedly stored in a vault. Uncertain, they take it to fence Jumbo Madigan to get his expert opinion. Blackie manages to free himself and the Runt, and persuades Madigan to go along with his story. However, when the police surround the place, Martens and Healy realize they have been double crossed, and shoot Madigan, though not fatally. When the cops break in, they do not spot the pair, posing as mannequins.

The crooks later return to their apartment. Blackie offers to steal the real diamond. They agree to his arrangement, but keep the Runt as a hostage. Blackie goes to Farraday, who surrounds the building with policemen. Then Blackie and Farraday enter the apartment to negotiate the Runt's release. Martens and Healy make a break for it, but are caught.

== Cast ==
- Chester Morris as Boston Blackie
- Janis Carter as Dorothy Anderson
- William Wright as Paul Martens
- Richard Lane as Inspector Farraday
- George E. Stone as The Runt
- Robert Williams as Matt Healy
- Mark Roberts as George Daley (as Robert E. Scott)
- Dorothy Malone as Eileen Daley (uncredited)
- Joseph Crehan as Jumbo Madigan (uncredited)
- Harrison Greene as Arthur Manleder (uncredited)
