= Lucien Ballard =

American cinematographer (1904–1988)

- Born: May 6, 1904; Miami, Oklahoma, U.S.
- Died: October 1, 1988 (aged 84); Rancho Mirage, California, U.S.
- Occupation: Cinematographer
- Years active: 1929–1978
- Spouses: Margaret McLellan (m. 1928; div. 1944) Merle Oberon (m. 1945; div. 1949) Inez Ethel Pokorny (m. 1949)
- Children: 4

Lucien Ballard A.S.C. (May 6, 1904 – October 1, 1988) was an American cinematographer. He worked on more than 130 films during his 50-year career, collaborating multiple times with directors including Josef von Sternberg, John Brahm, Henry Hathaway, Budd Boetticher, Raoul Walsh, Sam Peckinpah and Tom Gries. He was nominated for an Academy Award for Best Cinematography for The Caretakers (1963).

== Biography ==
Ballard was born in Miami, Oklahoma in 1904. His mother Ada was Cherokee and Lucien is listed on the Dawes Rolls as 1/16th Cherokee by Blood. He attended the University of Oklahoma and the University of Pennsylvania and after graduating, he became a surveyor.

Ballard began working on films at Paramount Studios in 1929 after dating a script woman there. He later joked in an interview that it was a three-day party at the home of actress Clara Bow that convinced him "this is the business for me". He began his career loading trucks at Paramount and trained to be a camera assistant. Much of his time was spent loading film magazines into cameras, as The International Photographer reported in 1929: "Al Micklin and Lucien Ballard have just completed an estimate that, were all the Eastman film they have loaded and all the DuPont film they have loaded, be stretched out in two parallel lines between Hollywood and Yokohama, it would be fogged."

Lucien Ballard was taken on as an assistant to Lee Garmes on Josef von Sternberg's Morocco (1930). Von Sternberg allowed him credit as a second cameraman on The Devil is a Woman (1935), and the two shared a Venice Film Festival award for Best Cinematography in 1935. Von Sternberg promoted him to director of photography on Crime and Punishment (1935) and The King Steps Out (1936), based on the life of Empress Elisabeth of Austria, both at Columbia Pictures. "Ballard's meteoric rise to fame as an ace cameraman is breathtaking," wrote technical columnist Herbert Aller in 1935. "For about six years he was an assistant, then suddenly a second cameraman, and within a short time thereafter a first cameraman. His technical and artistic schooling is too well known to record in this space."

Director Von Sternberg left Columbia after only two pictures, but Lucien Ballard stayed with the company and became a valuable member of the staff. After filming Dorothy Arzner's Craig's Wife he took assignments for the studio's "B" features such as The Devil's Playground (1937), Penitentiary (1938), and The Lone Wolf in Paris (1938). He also lent his professionalism to Columbia's Charles Starrett westerns and even its two-reel comedies, starring The Three Stooges, Charley Chase, Andy Clyde, and Harry Langdon. In an interview with Leonard Maltin, he said he enjoyed working on the shorts because they gave him the freedom to experiment with different lenses and filters, which likely would not have been permitted on features. Ballard left Columbia in 1940.

Ballard filmed Let Us Live! (1939) for John Brahm and made more films with him including Wild Geese Calling (1941) and The Lodger (1944). On the set of The Lodger, Ballard met and then married actress Merle Oberon; they remained married from 1945 until 1949. He photographed four more of her films – This Love of Ours (1945), Temptation (1946), Night Song (1948), Berlin Express (1948). She was involved in a near-fatal car crash in London, and sustained facial scarring. Ballard invented a special light for Oberon's benefit: the invention, mounted by the side of the camera, provided direct light onto a subject's face while reducing the appearance of blemishes and wrinkles. Named the "catch light" (informally the "Obie", short for "Oberon"), the device became widely used in the film industry.

In 1941's Howard Hughes film The Outlaw, Hughes cast Jane Russell in the lead and had numerous shots of her cleavage, which got the attention of the Hollywood censors. The film was shot in 1940 and 1941 but took five years to be released to selected theaters. Ballard was the camera man for the screen tests, did some of the second unit work for director Howard Hawks, and assisted cinematographer Gregg Toland on the first unit crew. He also filmed Laura (1944) for Rouben Mamoulian until Otto Preminger took over as director.

In 1930 Ballard had also worked with assistant director Henry Hathaway. This relationship with Hathaway came back to benefit Ballard when Hathaway himself became a director. They worked together on five films, including Diplomatic Courier (1952), Prince Valiant (1954), The Sons of Katie Elder (1965), Nevada Smith (1966), and True Grit (1969). The last, because of the natural beauty of southwestern Colorado, garnered Ballard acclaim among his peers. He also worked on a segment of O. Henry's Full House (1952) with him.

After working with Budd Boetticher on The Magnificent Matador (1955), they worked together on six feature films, including The Killer Is Loose (1956), Buchanan Rides Alone (1958),The Rise and Fall of Legs Diamond (1960), A Time for Dying (1969) and Arruza (1971) as well as the television show Maverick (1957) and the documentary My Kingdom For... (1985).

He made The House on Telegraph Hill (1951) and The Desert Rats (1953) for Robert Wise; Return of the Texan (1952) and Susan Slade (1961) with Delmer Daves; three films with Raoul Walsh including The King and Four Queens (1956) and Band of Angels (1957); and three films with Roy Ward Baker, including Inferno (1953), often considered the best shot color 3D film of the era. He also worked with Stanley Kubrick on The Killing (1956).

Ballard was nominated for an Academy Award for Best Cinematography for The Caretakers (1963).

Another relationship of importance was with Sam Peckinpah. They worked together on The Westerner (1960 television series), Ride the High Country (1962), The Wild Bunch (1969), The Ballad of Cable Hogue (1970), The Getaway (1972), and Junior Bonner (1972). He won the National Society of Film Critics award for Best Cinematography for The Wild Bunch.

He also formed a partnership with Tom Gries making five films, including Will Penny (1968) and Breakheart Pass (1976). His last feature film was Joan Rivers' Rabbit Test (1978) starring Billy Crystal in his film debut.

Ballard died at the age of 84 in 1988, two days after being involved in a car accident near his home in Indian Wells, California.

== Personal life ==
Ballard was married three times. In 1928 he wed Margaret J. McLellan; they divorced in 1944. He then married Merle Oberon; the union lasted five years. Finally, in 1949, he married Inez Pokorny, a world traveler and photographer who is sometimes credited as the first woman to explore the Amazon River from the Atlantic to the Pacific, who was killed in an automobile accident in 1982. He had two sons, Christopher and Anthony. Ballard also had two daughters, Zoe and Pamela, from his first marriage to McLellan.

== Partial filmography ==
- Crime and Punishment 1935
- The King Steps Out, 1936
- The Final Hour
- Craig's Wife, 1936
- The Devil's Playground, 1937
- Racketeers in Exile, 1937
- Penitentiary, 1938
- Rio Grande 1938
- The Lone Wolf in Paris, 1938
- Squadron of Honor 1938
- The Thundering West, 1939
- Texas Stampede 1939
- Let Us Live!, 1939
- Wild Geese Calling, 1941
- The Lodger, 1944
- This Love of Ours, 1945
- Temptation, 1946
- Berlin Express, 1948
- Night Song, 1948
- Fixed Bayonets!, 1951
- The House on Telegraph Hill, 1951
- Don't Bother to Knock, 1952
- Diplomatic Courier, 1952
- Return of the Texan, 1952
- Night Without Sleep, 1953
- Inferno, 1953
- The Desert Rats, 1953
- Prince Valiant, 1954
- The Magnificent Matador, 1955
- The King and Four Queens, 1956
- The Killing, 1956
- A Kiss Before Dying, 1956
- The Killer Is Loose, 1956
- Band of Angels, 1957
- Buchanan Rides Alone, 1958
- Murder by Contract, 1958
- The Rise and Fall of Legs Diamond, 1960
- Marines, Let's Go, 1961
- Susan Slade, 1961
- The Parent Trap, 1961
- Ride the High Country, 1962
- The Caretakers, 1963
- The Sons of Katie Elder, 1965
- Nevada Smith, 1966
- Hour of the Gun, 1967
- Will Penny, 1968
- The Party, 1968
- The Wild Bunch, 1969
- A Time for Dying, 1969
- True Grit, 1969
- The Ballad of Cable Hogue, 1970
- The Hawaiians, 1970
- Elvis: That's the Way It Is, 1970
- Arruza, 1971
- The Getaway, 1972
- Junior Bonner, 1972
- Lady Ice, 1973
- Breakout, 1975
- Breakheart Pass, 1976
- Rabbit Test, 1978
- My Kingdom For..., 1985
