= Bal Tabarin (film) =

1952 film by Philip Ford

- Theatrical release poster
- Directed by: Philip Ford
- Screenplay by: Houston Branch
- Produced by: Herbert J. Yates
- Starring: Muriel Lawrence; William Ching; Claire Carleton; Steve Brodie; Steven Geray
- Cinematography: Michel Kelber; Reggie Lanning
- Edited by: Tony Martinelli
- Music by: R. Dale Butts
- Production company: Republic Pictures
- Distributed by: Republic Pictures
- Release date: June 1, 1952
- Running time: 84 minutes
- Country: United States
- Language: English

Bal Tabarin is a 1952 American drama film directed by Philip Ford and starring Muriel Lawrence, William Ching, Claire Carleton and Steven Geray. The film was released on June 1, 1952 by Republic Pictures.

== Plot ==
Struggling American singer Judy Allen takes a job as a secretary to a wealthy man. When he is killed, she flees from the police and takes shelter in the Paris apartment of her friend Stella Simmons. She takes a job performing at the Bal Tabarin nightclub.

== Cast ==
- Muriel Lawrence as Judy Allen
- William Ching as Don Barlow
- Claire Carleton as Stella Simmons
- Steve Brodie as Joe Goheen
- Steven Geray as Inspector Manet
- Carl Milletaire as Little Augie
- Jan Rubini as Violinist
- Tom Powers as Eddie Mendies
- Gregory Gaye as Jean Dufar
- Adrienne D'Ambricourt as Madame Ramquet
- Herbert Deans as Inspector Llewelyn
- The Famous French Can-Can Dancers as Ensemble

== Bibliography ==
- Martin, Len D. . The Republic Pictures Checklist: Features, Serials, Cartoons, Short Subjects and Training Films of Republic Pictures Corporation, 1935-1959. McFarland, 1998.
