= Janet Martin =

American singer and film actress

- Born: United States
- Other name: Valya Valentina Tretiacov Terry
- Occupations: Singer, actress
- Years active: 1943–1948 (film)

Janet Martin was an American film actress and singer. She appeared in a number of Republic Pictures' films during the 1940s.

== Early years ==
Martin was born Valya Valentina Tetiacov Terry, the daughter of Alexandria Myra Tetiacov Terry (also known as Myra Skolskaya). Her mother "was a well-known opera singer in Czarist Russia." (Another source gives Martin's original name as both Valya Sokolskaya and Valya Sobolskaya.) She said that she changed her name to avoid political arguments related to Russian political policies.

In 1947, Martin began studying journalism at the University of Southern California, believing that knowing about writing would make her a better actress.

== Film ==
Martin went to Hollywood to gain acting experience in Little Theater productions. When she was 14, she signed a seven-year contract with Republic Pictures.

== Selected filmography ==
- Call of the South Seas (1944)
- Hands Across the Border (1944)
- Lake Placid Serenade (1944)
- The Yellow Rose of Texas (1944)
- A Sporting Chance (1945)
- Bells of Rosarita (1945)
- Calendar Girl (1947)
- Heart of Virginia (1948)
- King of the Gamblers (1948)
- Train to Alcatraz (1948)

== Bibliography ==
- Len D. Martin. The Republic Pictures Checklist: Features, Serials, Cartoons, Short Subjects and Training Films of Republic Pictures Corporation, 1935–1959. McFarland, 1998.
