= Heart of Virginia =

1948 film by R. G. Springsteen

- Directed by: R. G. Springsteen
- Written by: Jerry Sackheim; John K. Butler
- Produced by: Sidney Picker
- Starring: Janet Martin; Robert Lowery; Frankie Darro
- Cinematography: John MacBurnie
- Edited by: Irving M. Schoenberg
- Music by: Dave Kahn
- Production company: Republic Pictures
- Distributed by: Republic Pictures
- Release date: October 24, 1948
- Running time: 60 minutes
- Country: United States
- Language: English

Heart of Virginia is a 1948 American sports drama film directed by R. G. Springsteen and starring Janet Martin, Robert Lowery and Frankie Darro. Believing that he is responsible for the death of a fellow rider, a jockey develops a fear of the racetrack.

The film's art direction was by Frank Arrigo.

== Plot ==
Racehorse owner Whit Galtry wants his horse Virginia's Pride to win so he can buy a new automobile for his daughter Virginia. He pressures jockey Jimmy Easter to do whatever it takes to finish first, but Jimmy inadvertently causes an accident that results in the death of another horse's rider.

A distraught Jimmy quits racing. Virginia's horse interests wealthy stable owner Dan Lockwood, who soon demonstrates an interest in her as well. Jimmy reluctantly trains and rides the horse, but when Virginia's Pride is injured, her father beats Jimmy with a whip. Dan seems to lose interest in Virginia when her horse is hurt, but ultimately both the horse and the romance are successful.

== Cast ==
- Janet Martin as Virginia Galtry
- Robert Lowery as Dan Lockwood
- Frankie Darro as Jimmy Easter
- Paul Hurst as Whit Galtry
- Sam McDaniel as 'Sunflower' Jones
- Tom Chatterton as Dr. Purdy
- Benny Bartlett as 'Breezy' Brent
- Glen Vernon as Bud Landeen
- Edmund Cobb as Gas Station Attendant

== See also ==
- List of films about horses
- List of films about horse racing

== Bibliography ==
- Len D. Martin. The Republic Pictures Checklist: Features, Serials, Cartoons, Short Subjects and Training Films of Republic Pictures Corporation, 1935-1959. McFarland, 1998.
