= William Wright (actor) =

American actor (1911–1949)

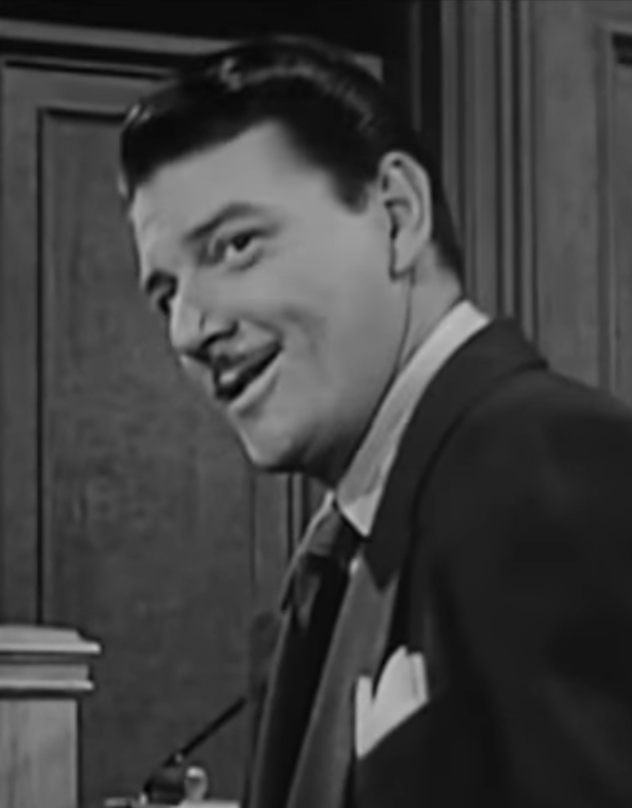
- Wright in Impact (1949)
- Born: January 5, 1911; Ogden, Utah, U.S.
- Died: January 19, 1949 (aged 38)
- Occupation: Actor
- Years active: 1936–1949

William Wright (January 5, 1911 – January 19, 1949) was an American actor.

== Career ==
He was a leading man in films who was most popular in the 1940s when he was typically compared to Clark Gable, whose career was temporarily derailed by World War II. Wright even played Gable's part in a 1945 musical comedy remake of It Happened One Night entitled Eve Knew Her Apples. He also played Philo Vance in Philo Vance Returns (1947) and the title role in King of the Gamblers (1948). Wright's other films include Escape in the Fog (1945), Rose of the Yukon (1949), Daughter of the Jungle (1949), and Impact (1949). Wright died from cancer in 1949, two weeks after his 38th birthday; he was buried at his birthplace in Ogden, Utah.

== Filmography ==
Year	Title	Role	Notes
1936	China Clipper	Pilot	
1937	Swing High, Swing Low	Attendant	Uncredited
1937	Blazing Barriers	CCC Boy	Uncredited
1941	Rookies on Parade	Bob Madison	
1941	Kiss the Boys Goodbye	Reporter	Uncredited
1941	World Premiere	Luther Shinkley	
1941	The Devil Pays Off	Christopher Waring	
1941	Glamour Boy	Hank Landon	
1941	Louisiana Purchase	Ambulance Driver	Uncredited
1942	Fly-by-Night	Intern	Uncredited
1942	True to the Army	Lt. Danvers	
1942	Not a Ladies' Man	John Keen	
1942	Sweetheart of the Fleet	Lt. Philip Blaine	
1942	Meet the Stewarts	Winkie Rogers	Uncredited
1942	Henry and Dizzy	Announcer	Uncredited
1942	Night in New Orleans	George Wallace	
1942	Sweater Girl	Announcer	Uncredited
1942	Parachute Nurse	Lt. Woods	
1942	A Man's World	Dan O'Driscoll	
1942	Lucky Legs	'Pinkie' Connors	
1942	Daring Young Man	Sam Long	
1942	Boston Blackie Goes Hollywood	Slick Barton	
1942	A Night to Remember	Scott Carstairs	
1943	Reveille with Beverly	Barry Lang	
1943	Murder in Times Square	Det. Lt. Tabor	
1943	Saddles and Sagebrush	Krag Savin	
1944	One Mysterious Night	Paul Martens	
1944	Dancing in Manhattan	Steve Crawford	
1945	Eadie Was a Lady	Tommy Foley	
1945	Escape in the Fog	Barry Malcolm	
1945	Eve Knew Her Apples	Ward Williams	
1946	The Mask of Diijon	Tony Holiday	
1946	Lover Come Back	Jimmy Hennessey	
1946	Down Missouri Way	Mike Burton	
1946	Nocturne	Mr. Billings	(scenes deleted)
1947	The Beginning or the End	Colonel John Lansdale	
1947	Philo Vance Returns	Philo Vance	
1947	Gas House Kids Go West	Jim Kingsley	
1947	Doctor Jim	Dr. Sylvester	
1948	King of the Gamblers	Dave Fowler	
1949	Rose of the Yukon	Tom Clark	
1949	Daughter of the Jungle	Carl Easton	
1949	Impact	Prosecutor	
1949	Air Hostess	Fred MacCoy	(final film role)
