= The Magnificent Matador =

1955 film

- Theatrical release poster
- Directed by: Budd Boetticher
- Screenplay by: Budd Boetticher; Charles Lang
- Produced by: Edward L. Alperson
- Starring: Maureen O'Hara; Anthony Quinn; Manuel Rojas; Richard Denning; Thomas Gomez; Lola Albright; William Brooks Ching
- Cinematography: Lucien Ballard
- Edited by: Richard Cahoon
- Music by: Raoul Kraushaar
- Production company: Edward L. Alperson Productions
- Distributed by: 20th Century Fox
- Release date: May 24, 1955
- Running time: 94 minutes
- Country: United States
- Language: English

The Magnificent Matador is a 1955 American drama film directed by Budd Boetticher and written by Budd Boetticher and Charles Lang. The film stars Maureen O'Hara, Anthony Quinn, Manuel Rojas, Richard Denning, Thomas Gomez, Lola Albright, William Brooks Ching and an early appearance of Stuart Whitman. The film was released on May 24, 1955, by 20th Century Fox.

== Cast ==
- Maureen O'Hara as Karen Harrison
- Anthony Quinn as Luís Santos
- Manuel Rojas as Rafael Reyes
- Richard Denning as Mark Russell
- Thomas Gomez as Don David
- Lola Albright as Mona Wilton
- William Brooks Ching as Jody Wilton
- Eduardo Noriega as Miguel
- Lorraine Chanel as Sarita Sebastian
- Anthony Caruso as Emiliano
- Jesus 'Chucho' Solorzano as himself
- Joaquín Rodríguez 'Cagancho' as himself
- Rafael Rodríguez as himself
- Antonio Velasquez as himself
- Jorge 'Ranchero' Aguilar as himself
- Stuart Whitman as Man in the Arena

== Production ==
Budd Boetticher said he wrote the film for Quinn who had "won two Academy Awards, and he couldn't get a job. So I wrote a script, and the studio changed the title to The Magnificent Matador, which is about the worst title you can imagine. He was typed; he couldn't get work, so I wrote a script in which he was the star. Maureen O'Hara played the opposite lead; she was great, the greatest lady I ever worked with. The picture was OK, but I was happier about what it did for Anthony Quinn. We put him in a that gold suit, and he was a star! He wasn't a star in Viva Zapata (1952), he was a character actor, and The Magnificent Matador made him a star of the first magnitude."
