= Mummy's Dummies =

1948 American short film by Edward Bernds

- Directed by: Edward Bernds
- Written by: Elwood Ullman
- Produced by: Hugh McCollum
- Starring: Moe Howard; Larry Fine; Shemp Howard; Vernon Dent; Ralph Dunn; Philip Van Zandt; Dee Green
- Cinematography: Allen G. Siegler
- Edited by: Henry DeMond
- Distributed by: Columbia Pictures
- Release date: November 4, 1948 (U.S.)
- Running time: 16:02
- Country: United States
- Language: English

Mummy's Dummies is a 1948 short subject directed by Edward Bernds starring American slapstick comedy team The Three Stooges (Moe Howard, Larry Fine and Shemp Howard). It is the 111th entry in the series released by Columbia Pictures starring the comedians, who released 190 shorts for the studio between 1934 and 1959.

== Plot ==
The Stooges are employed as purveyors of used chariots in the milieu of Ancient Egypt, a vocation fraught with misfortune as they unwittingly deceive Rhadames, the esteemed captain of the royal guards, with a substandard chariot.

The consequential arrest leads the Stooges to stand trial before Pharaoh Rootentootin within the palace precincts, the monarch beset by the affliction of a painful toothache. Seizing upon an opportunity for redemption, Moe interjects, asserting Shemp's expertise in dentistry under the pseudonym "Painless Papyrus." Shemp, despite his visual impairment, endeavors to extract the troublesome tooth, inadvertently causing injury to the Pharaoh's nose. Nonetheless, the successful extraction of the tooth prompts the Pharaoh to bestow upon the Stooges the esteemed title of royal chamberlains.

Assuming their newfound positions, the trio uncover a villainous plot involving the misappropriation of tax revenues orchestrated by the Pharaoh's tax collector, Tutamon, in collusion with Rhadames. Once again, the Stooges emerge as saviors to the Pharaoh, prompting the monarch to offer the hand of his daughter, Fatima, in marriage as a token of gratitude.

== Cast ==
=== Credited ===
- Moe Howard as Moe
- Larry Fine as Larry
- Shemp Howard as Shemp
- Vernon Dent as Pharaoh Rootentooten
- Ralph Dunn as Rhadames
- Phil Van Zandt as Tutamon
- Dee Green as Princess Fatima

=== Uncredited ===
- Wanda Perry as Fatima
- Suzanne Ridgeway as slave girl
- Jean Spangler as slave girl
- Virginia Ellsworth as slave girl
- Cy Malis as palace guard/Shemp's stand-in

== Production notes ==
Mummy's Dummies was filmed on August 19–22, 1947. The film takes place during the reign of Pharaoh Rootentootin, played by the rather tall and rotund Vernon Dent, but in the film We Want Our Mummy, Rootintootin is said to be a midget.

Every Three Stooges short produced in the 1940s featuring Shemp Howard as the third Stooge was remade in the 1950s except for Mummy's Dummies.
