= William Ching =

American actor (1913–1989)

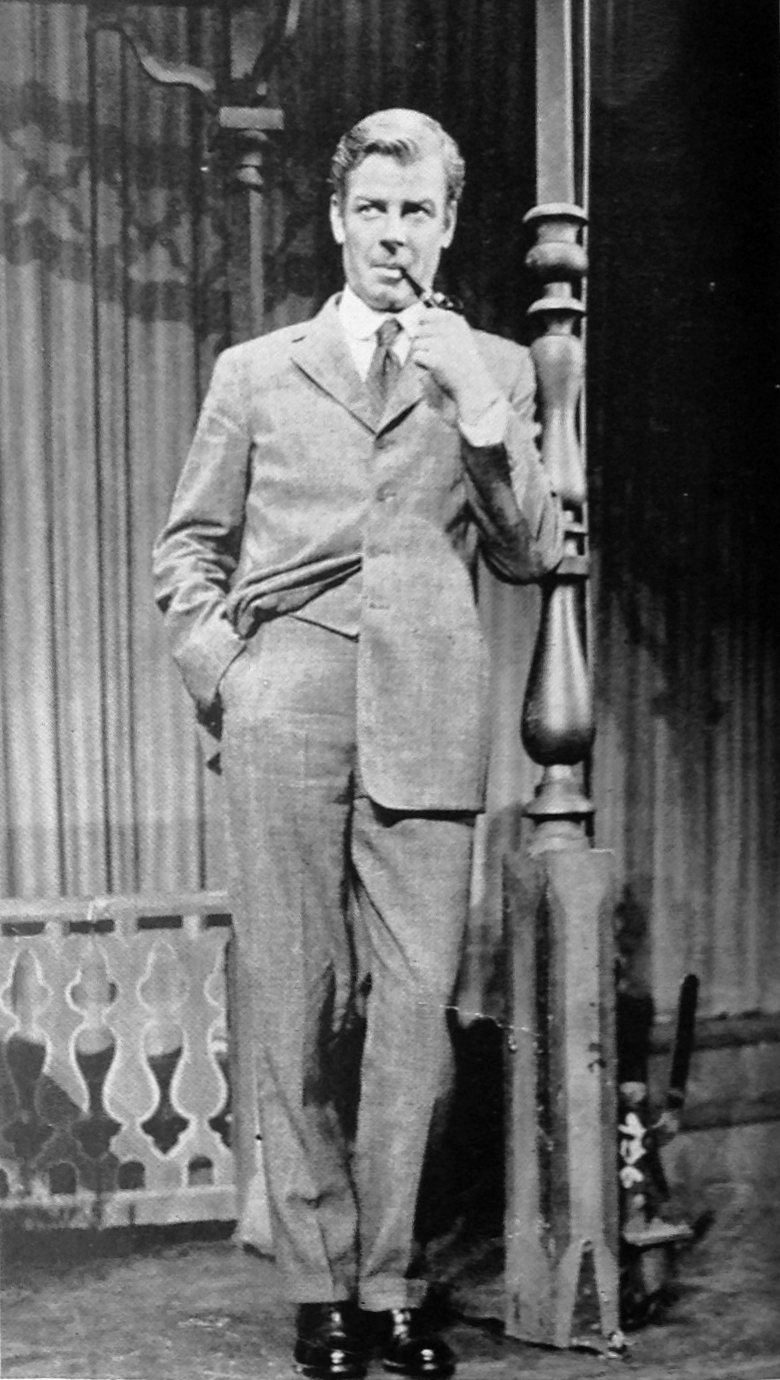
- Ching as Dr. Taylor in Rodgers and Hammerstein's Allegro (1947)
- Born: William Brooks Ching; October 2, 1913; St. Louis, Missouri, U.S.
- Died: July 1, 1989 (aged 75); Tustin, California, U.S.
- Resting place: Fairhaven Memorial Park, Santa Ana, California
- Occupation: Actor
- Years active: 1946–1959
- Spouse(s): Lucile Rieger (m. 19??; died 1958) Evelyn Olmsted (m. 1958)
- Children: 3

William Brooks Ching (October 2, 1913 – July 1, 1989) was an American character actor who appeared in numerous films and on television during the later 1940s and 1950s. Ching may be best known for his supporting role in Rudolph Maté's 1950 film noir D.O.A. along with his role as the overbearing boyfriend of Katharine Hepburn's character in George Cukor's 1952 comedy Pat and Mike.

== Early years ==
Ching was born in St. Louis and raised in New Orleans. During World War II, he served in the Coast Guard.

== Career ==
Ching began his career as a professional singer, starring in a summer series at the Memphis Open Air Theater. He appeared in musical comedies such as Rodgers and Hammerstein's Allegro (1947). His first film role was in 1946. He signed with Republic Pictures in 1947, and for the next dozen years, acted mostly in Westerns and dramas. Ching declined to change his name at the time of his move to films, though it might give the mistaken impression that he was of Asian descent.

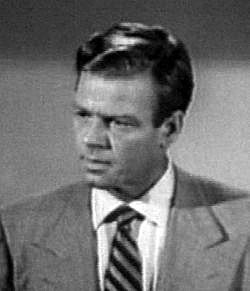
Ching in DOA (1950)

He appeared in the Randolph Scott Western Tall Man Riding (1955). The same year, Ching was cast as Clint Allbright on CBS's Our Miss Brooks. In 1958, he played Glenn McKay in the Perry Mason episode, "The Case of the Corresponding Corpse". His last major acting credit was in a 1959 episode of the television series 77 Sunset Strip.

== Death ==
In 1989, at age 75, Ching died of congestive heart failure. He is buried at Fairhaven Memorial Park in Santa Ana, California.

== Partial filmography ==
- The Mysterious Mr. M (1946, Serial) - Jim Farrell [Chs. 1-3]
- I'll Be Yours (1947) - Stage Door Johnny (uncredited)
- The Michigan Kid (1947) - Steve Randolph Prescott
- Song of Scheherazade (1947) - Midshipman (uncredited)
- Buck Privates Come Home (1947) - 2nd Lieutenant, Mess Officer (uncredited)
- Something in the Wind (1947) - Joe (uncredited)
- The Wistful Widow of Wagon Gap (1947) - Jim Simpson
- Life of St. Paul Series (1949) - Jailer
- D.O.A. (1950) - Halliday
- In a Lonely Place (1950) - Ted Barton
- The Showdown (1950) - Mike Shattay
- Surrender (1950) - John Beauregard Hale
- Belle Le Grand (1951) - Bill Shanks
- Oh! Susanna (1951) - Corporal Donlin
- The Sea Hornet (1951) - Sprowl
- The Wild Blue Yonder (1951) - Lt. Ted Cranshaw
- Bal Tabarin (1952) - Don Barlow
- Pat and Mike (1952) - Collier Weld
- Never Wave at a WAC (1953) - Lt. Col. Schuyler 'Sky' Fairchild
- Scared Stiff (1953) - Tony Warren
- The Moonlighter (1953) - Tom Anderson
- Give a Girl a Break (1953) - Anson Prichett
- The Magnificent Matador (1955) - Jody Wilton
- Tall Man Riding (1955) - Rex Willard
- Terror in the Haunted House (1958) - Mark Snell
- Escort West (1959) - Capt. Howard Poole
