= King of the Gamblers =

1948 film directed by George Blair

- Directed by: George Blair
- Written by: Albert DeMond; Bradbury Foote
- Produced by: Stephen Auer
- Starring: Janet Martin; William Wright; Thurston Hall
- Cinematography: John MacBurnie
- Edited by: Robert M. Leeds
- Music by: Mort Glickman
- Production company: Republic Pictures
- Distributed by: Republic Pictures
- Release date: April 26, 1948
- Running time: 60 minutes
- Country: United States
- Language: English

King of the Gamblers is a 1948 American crime film directed by George Blair and starring Janet Martin, William Wright and Thurston Hall.

The film's sets were designed by the art director Frank Hotaling.

== Cast ==
- Janet Martin as Jean Lacey
- William Wright as Dave Fowler
- Thurston Hall as 'Pop' Morton
- Stephanie Bachelor as Elsie Pringle
- George Meeker as Bernie Dupal
- Wally Vernon as Mike Burns
- William Henry as Jerry Muller
- James Cardwell as 'Speed' Lacey
- Jonathan Hale as Sam Hyland
- Selmer Jackson as Judge
- Howard Negley as Jordan
- John Holland as Symonds
- George Anderson as O'Brien
- Ralph Dunn as Cassidy
- John Albright as Bartender
- George Eldredge as Saunders (uncredited)
- Vera Marshe as Lorraine (uncredited)
- Clarence Muse as Tom the Porter (uncredited)

== Bibliography ==
- Len D. Martin. The Republic Pictures Checklist: Features, Serials, Cartoons, Short Subjects and Training Films of Republic Pictures Corporation, 1935-1959. McFarland, 1998.
