= Tall Man Riding =

1955 film by Lesley Selander

- Theatrical release poster
- Directed by: Lesley Selander
- Screenplay by: Joseph Hoffman
- Based on: Tall Man Riding (novel); 1951 novel by Norman A. Fox
- Produced by: David Weisbart
- Starring: Randolph Scott; Dorothy Malone; Peggie Castle
- Cinematography: Wilfred M. Cline
- Edited by: Irene Morra
- Music by: Paul Sawtell
- Production company: Warner Bros. Pictures
- Distributed by: Warner Bros. Pictures
- Release date: June 18, 1955
- Running time: 83 minutes
- Country: United States
- Language: English
- Box office: $1.4 million (US)

Tall Man Riding is a 1955 American Western Warnercolor film directed by Lesley Selander and starring Randolph Scott, Dorothy Malone, and Peggie Castle. Based on the novel Tall Man Riding, by Norman A. Fox, the film is about a cowboy (Scott) seeking revenge against a ranch owner for publicly whipping him years earlier and for breaking up his relationship with the ranch owner's daughter (Malone).

== Plot ==
Seven years after being expelled from the city by cattle baron Tucker Ordway, Larry Madden returns to take revenge and claim his rightful land. He also plans to resume romance with beautiful Corinna, Tucker's daughter. Incredulous Corinna finally allies with Larry, who is still undecided whether to kill Ordway, as doing so would separate him from society for the rest of his life.

Revenge seldom travels in a straight line.Arriving in Montana after a long absence, Larry Madden discovers he isn't the only one who wants revenge against Tucker Ordway. Gambling Hall owner Cibo Pearlo also holds a grudge, but Madden refuses an alliance;judging Perlo to be as corrupt as Ordway from a different direction.And he takes an instant dislike to Perlo's gunsel The Peso Kid;whose specialty is shooting people in the back. Tomboy music hall entertainer Reva is technically Pearlo's girl.But she takes an instant liking to Madden and eventually takes on the dangerous job of his "inside source". Madden has employed lawyer Ames Luddington to investigate Ordway's affairs, and it is discovered Ordway has no legal claim to the land his ranch is built on.But Madden is consumed by revenge and rejects taking "the easy way out". Rex Willard is the new husband of Corinna---Pearlo decides to frame him into prison for murder.Madden had saved Willard from ambush and killed one of his attackers.Willard decides not to fight the charge, determined to expose Pearlo in court. But the stage taking him to trial in t he County Seat is ambushed by The Peso Kid, and Willard is killed along with the stagecoach driver. Madden arrives minutes later. Now that he has been "placed at the scene", a rumor starts that he committed the killings. Maaden hauls crooked deputy Sheriff Jeff Barclay into the center of town and beats the truth out of him in a bloody bareknuckle fight.He then delivers Barclay to the Ordway ranch for charges to be pressed. During a brief period when Madden is inside the house and arranging for a duel between himself and Tucker;Barclay is murdered by The Peso Kid.

Madden accepts the unusual provisions of the duel---inside a totally dark shack. Madden shoots and wounds Ordway---then finds out Ordway has been slowly losing his eyesight and it was hardly a fair fight. Corinna upbraids him for the incident.Feeling ashamed, Madden returns to town to discover The Federal Government has declared The ordway ranch to be open territory for settlers, and the Ordways have been evicted. Lawyer Luddington senses a gold mine, but Madden tells him he is calling off his revenge campaign. Luddington calls him a sucker for refusing the money grab and Madden knocks him down.Luddington's instant response is to ally himself with Pearlo. Pearlo has The Peso Kid murder Reva when her friendship with Madden is discovered.On her deathbed, Reva asks Madden to forgive Corinna because she can tell Corinna is still in love with him.

When the evicted Ordway's arrive in town, The Peso Kid stalks them but Madden kills him in a gunfight;denying that he did it out of friendship. A wild land rush for the Ordway property soon begins---Madden is determined to be there first;but only so he can give the property back to The Ordways and then leave town. When he does arrive, Pearlo and Luddington are waiting in ambush---but Madden is able to shoot both of them dead.

Relations with the Ordways are patched up, and Corinna leads Madden into "their home" to tend his bullet wounds.

== Cast ==
- Randolph Scott as Larry Madden
- Dorothy Malone as Corinna Ordway
- Peggie Castle as Reva, Pearlo's Palace entertainer
- Bill Ching as Rex Willard
- John Baragrey as Cibo Pearlo
- Robert Barrat as Tucker Ordway
- John Dehner as Ames Luddington
- Paul Richards as The Peso Kid
- Lane Chandler as Hap Sutton
- Mickey Simpson as Deputy Jeff Barclay
- Joe Bassett as Will
- Charles Watts as Al, Pearlo's Palace bartender
- Russ Conway as Marshal Jim Feathergill
- Holly Bane as Tom
- Philo McCullough as Townsman (uncredited)
- Jack Mower as Townsman (uncredited)
- William Fawcett (actor) as Andy (uncredited)

== Production ==
It was one of a series of Westerns featuring Dorothy Malone.

=== Filming locations ===
- Dijon Street, Warner Brothers Burbank Studios, 4000 Warner Boulevard, Burbank, California, USA
- French Ranch, Hidden Valley Road, Thousand Oaks, California, USA
- Iverson Ranch, 1 Iverson Lane, Chatsworth, Los Angeles, California, USA
- Janss Conejo Ranch, Thousand Oaks, California, USA
- Universal Studios, 100 Universal City Plaza, Universal City, California, USA (Six Points western town)

=== Soundtrack ===
- "Oh, he Looked Like He Might Buy Wine" (Ray Heindorf and Sammy Cahn)
- "It Looks Like a Big Night Tonight" (Egbert Van Alstyne and Harry Williams)
- "As the Brass Band Played" (Ray Heindorf and Jack Scholl)

== See also ==
- List of American films of 1955
