= Blades of the Musketeers =

1953 film by Budd Boetticher

Blades of the Musketeers is a 1953 American film adaptation of the 1844 novel The Three Musketeers for Hal Roach Studios.

It was originally shot as an episode of the 1950 TV series Magnavox Theater.

It was also known as Sword of D'artagnan.

== Cast ==
- Robert Clarke as D'Artagnan
- John Hubbard as Athos
- Mel Archer as Portos
- Keith Richards as Aramis
- Paul Cavanagh as Cardinal Richelieu
- Don Beddoe as King Louis XIII
- Marjorie Lord as Queen Anne of Austria
- Lyn Thomas as Constance
- Kristine Miller as Lady DeWinter
- Charles Lang as Buckingham
- Peter Mamakos as Rochefort
- James Craven as De Treville
- Byron Foulger as Du Verges

== Production ==
Budd Boetticher says Hal Roach called him saying he wanted to adapt The Three Musketeers as an hour picture for television to be shot over three days. Boetticher agreed to direct it for $500 a day and says it took three and a half days. He says a year later the film was released theatrically.

Another report says the film was shot in four days.
