= Wings of the Hawk =

1953 film by Budd Boetticher

- Directed by: Budd Boetticher
- Written by: Kay Lenard (adaptation)
- Screenplay by: James E. Moser
- Based on: Gerald Drayson Adams (novel)
- Produced by: Aaron Rosenberg
- Starring: Van Heflin; Julia Adams
- Cinematography: Clifford Stine
- Edited by: Russell Schoengarth
- Music by: Frank Skinner
- Color process: Technicolor
- Production company: Universal International Pictures
- Distributed by: Universal Pictures
- Release date: August 26, 1953 (New York)
- Running time: 81 minutes
- Country: United States
- Language: English

Wings of the Hawk is a 1953 3-D American Western film directed by Budd Boetticher and starring Van Heflin and Julia Adams. It is set during the Mexican Revolution.

== Plot ==
Mexico, 1911: An expatriate American known as "Irish" Gallagher joins up with Mexican revolutionaries when the mine where he and partner Marco have just struck gold is seized by Colonel Paco Ruiz, a corrupt official who rules the province. Marco is killed by Ruiz.

A band of rebels saves Irish from certain death, with a particularly brave one, a woman, Raquel Noriega, being wounded by gunfire. The rebels aren't sure about Irish so they take him back to their leader, Arturo Torres. As they talk, Raquel faints from her injury, and Irish offers to remove the bullet.

Raquel is engaged to marry Arturo. Her sister Elena has been kidnapped. When they go search for the sister, Raquel and Irish are taken prisoner by Ruiz and locked in a cell. Elena is not a captive after all and says she intends to marry Ruiz. She mistakenly trusts the villainous Ruiz, who coldly executes the mother of one of Arturo's loyal rebels, Tomas.

Irish and Raquel are broken out of jail by the rebels, but Arturo is killed. Irish, realizing how much Ruiz values the gold in the mine, booby-traps it with dynamite and sets off the explosions while Tomas kills Ruiz to avenge his mother's death. When asked by Raquel why he destroyed his own mine, Irish says there is something he loves more, and they kiss.

== Cast ==
- Van Heflin as Irish Gallagher
- Julia Adams as Raquel Noriega
- Abbe Lane as Elena Noriega
- George Dolenz as Col. Paco Ruiz
- Noah Beery as Pasquel Orozco
- Rodolfo Acosta as Arturo Torres
- Antonio Moreno as Father Perez
- Pedro Gonzalez as Tomas
- Paul Fierro as Carlos
- Mario Siletti as Marco
- Rico Alaniz as Capt. Gomez

== Reception ==
The film opened August 26, 1953 at Loew's State Theatre in New York City.

Although initially released in 3-D, due to waning popularity of the process, the film was offered in 2-D as well after just one month of release.
