= Oh! Susanna (film) =

1951 film by Joseph Kane

- Theatrical release poster
- Directed by: Joseph Kane
- Screenplay by: Charles Marquis Warren
- Produced by: Joseph Kane
- Starring: Rod Cameron; Lorna Gray; Forrest Tucker; Chill Wills; William Ching; Jim Davis; Wally Cassell
- Cinematography: Jack A. Marta
- Edited by: Arthur Roberts
- Music by: R. Dale Butts
- Production company: Republic Pictures
- Distributed by: Republic Pictures
- Release date: March 29, 1951 (New York)
- Running time: 90 minutes
- Country: United States
- Language: English

Oh! Susanna is a 1951 Republic Pictures Western film directed by Joseph Kane, written by Charles Marquis Warren and starring Rod Cameron, Lorna Gray (billed as Adrian Booth), Forrest Tucker and Chill Wills.

== Plot ==
Cavalry officers clash over a saloon singer and an Indian treaty in the gold-rush Dakota Territory.

== Cast ==
- Rod Cameron as Captain Webb Calhoun
- Lorna Gray as Lia Wilson (billed as Adrian Booth)
- Forrest Tucker as Lieutenant Colonel Unger
- Chill Wills as Sergeant Barhydt
- William Ching as Corporal Donlin
- Jim Davis as Ira Jordan
- Wally Cassell as Trooper Muro
- Jimmy Lydon as Trumpeter Benton
- Douglas Kennedy as Trooper Emers
- William Haade as Trooper Riorty
- John Compton as Lieutenant Cutter
- James Flavin as Captain Worth
- Charles Stevens as Charlie Grass
- Al Bridge as Jake Ledbetter
- Marion Randolph as Mrs. Worth
- Marshall Reed as Trooper Murray
- John Pickard as Rennie
- Ruth Brennan as Young wife
- Louise Kane as Mary Bannon

== Production ==
Parts of the film were shot in Aspen Mirror Lake and Strawberry Valley in Utah.

== Reception ==
In a contemporary review for The New York Times, critic A. H. Weiler wrote: "[T]his saga of strife in the Black Hills of the Dakota Territory is what any dime-novel reader might expect. ... This, however, can be said for the adventure. It has about as much conflict as could be wished."
