= Sweetheart of the Fleet =

1942 film

- Theatrical release poster
- Directed by: Charles Barton
- Screenplay by: Albert Duffy; Maurice Tombragel; Ned Dandy
- Story by: Albert Duffy
- Produced by: Jack Fier
- Starring: Joan Davis; Jinx Falkenburg; Joan Woodbury; Blanche Stewart; Elvia Allman; William Wright
- Cinematography: Philip Tannura
- Edited by: Richard Fantl
- Production company: Columbia Pictures
- Distributed by: Columbia Pictures
- Release date: May 21, 1942
- Running time: 65 minutes
- Country: United States
- Language: English

Sweetheart of the Fleet is a 1942 American comedy film directed by Charles Barton and written by Albert Duffy, Maurice Tombragel and Ned Dandy. The film stars Joan Davis, Jinx Falkenburg, Joan Woodbury, Blanche Stewart, Elvia Allman and William Wright. The film was released on May 21, 1942, by Columbia Pictures.

== Cast ==
- Joan Davis as Phoebe Weyms
- Jinx Falkenburg as Jerry Gilbert
- Joan Woodbury as Kitty Leslie
- Blanche Stewart as Brenda
- Elvia Allman as Cobina
- William Wright as Lt. Philip Blaine
- Robert Kellard as Ensign George 'Tip' Landers
- Tim Ryan as Gordon Crouse
- George McKay as Hambone Skelly
- Walter Sande as Daffy Dill
- Dick Elliott as Chumley
- Charles Trowbridge as Commander Hawes
- Tom Seidel as Bugsy
- Irving Bacon as Standish
- Lloyd Bridges as Sailor
- Stanley Brown as Callboy
- Boyd Davis as Mayor
