= Devil's Playground (1937 film) =

1937 film by Erle C. Kenton

- Directed by: Erle C. Kenton
- Written by: Jerome Chodorov; Edward Chodorov; Norman Springer; Liam O'Flaherty; Dalton Trumbo
- Produced by: Edward Chodorov
- Starring: Richard Dix; Dolores del Río; Chester Morris; Ward Bond
- Cinematography: Lucien Ballard
- Edited by: Viola Lawrence
- Music by: Morris Stoloff
- Production company: Columbia Pictures
- Distributed by: Columbia Pictures
- Release date: January 24, 1937
- Running time: 74 minutes
- Country: United States
- Language: English

Devil's Playground is a 1937 American romantic drama film directed by Erle C. Kenton and starring Richard Dix, Dolores del Río and Chester Morris. It is a remake of Frank Capra's Submarine (1928).

== Plot ==
Submarine chief petty officers Dorgan and Mason battle on land for the affections of dancehall girl Carmen. She marries Dorgan but makes a play for Mason when her husband is away on sea duty. The romantic rivalry is forgotten when Dorgan must rescue Mason and his crew from a sunken sub.

== Cast ==
- Richard Dix as Jack Dorgan
- Dolores del Río as Carmen
- Chester Morris as Robert Mason
- Ward Bond as Sidecar Wilson
- John Gallaudet as Jones
- Pierre Watkin as Submarine Commander
- Francis McDonald as Romano
- Stanley Andrews as Salvage Boat Commander
