= Rose of the Yukon =

1949 film by George Blair

- Theatrical release poster
- Directed by: George Blair
- Screenplay by: Norman S. Hall
- Produced by: Stephen Auer
- Starring: Steve Brodie; Myrna Dell; William Wright; Emory Parnell; Jonathan Hale; Benny Baker
- Cinematography: John MacBurnie
- Edited by: Harry Keller
- Music by: Stanley Wilson
- Production company: Republic Pictures
- Distributed by: Republic Pictures
- Release date: January 5, 1949
- Running time: 69 minutes
- Country: United States
- Language: English

Rose of the Yukon is a 1949 American adventure film directed by George Blair and written by Norman S. Hall. The film stars Steve Brodie, Myrna Dell, William Wright, Emory Parnell, Jonathan Hale and Benny Baker. The film was released on January 5, 1949, by Republic Pictures.

== Cast ==
- Steve Brodie as Maj. Geoffrey Barnett
- Myrna Dell as Rose Flambeau
- William Wright as Tom Clark
- Emory Parnell as Tim MacNab
- Jonathan Hale as Gen. Butler
- Benny Baker as Jack Wells
- Gene Gary as French Frenay
- Dick Elliott as Doc Read
- Francis McDonald as Alaskan
- Wade Crosby as Alaskan
- Lotus Long as Eskimo girl
- Eugene Sigaloff as Capt. Rossoff
