= Submarine Raider =

1942 film by Lew Landers

- Directed by: Lew Landers
- Screenplay by: Aubrey Wisberg
- Produced by: Wallace MacDonald
- Starring: John Howard; Marguerite Chapman; Bruce Bennett
- Cinematography: Franz Planer
- Edited by: William A. Lyon
- Distributed by: Columbia Pictures
- Release date: June 4, 1942
- Running time: 65 minutes
- Country: United States
- Language: English

Submarine Raider is a 1942 American war film directed by Lew Landers and starring John Howard.

== Plot ==
A Japanese aircraft carrier is heading to Hawaii, and it sinks a civilian yacht. An American submarine receives its distress call. Three of the crew escape to a lifeboat but are shot at by a Japanese zero. Only a single female survives. She is rescued by a US submarine, but they cannot send out the carrier's position as the Japanese aircraft carrier is jamming all signals. The Japanese intercept the messages and realize one person survived. The sub surfaces and detects a Japanese plane, sent to attack them. They manage to hit the pilot and then crash dive. The plane continues to drop bombs on them, damaging the radio transmitter. The pilot then crashes into the ocean. The sub tries to contact Pearl Harbor to warn them that an attack is imminent but are unable to reach them.

The carrier continues on its way, opting to not rescue the pilot.

An American naval officer (and brother of the sub's captain) is returning with his date to Pearl Harbor. He is shot at, but the shot misses. The officer chases the car that fired the shot, but all the culprits escape. The officer realizes that an attack on Pearl Harbor might be next. When they arrive at the dance club, he leaves a message for his brother to contact him as soon as he arrives at Pearl Harbor. It's clearly indicated that there are many Japanese spies on the island. The officer is knocked out cold by one of them. He awakens early the next morning (December 7, 1941).

The local news announces that Pearl Harbor is being attacked by Japanese planes. The Captain hears his brother Bill has been killed in a taxi, along with his driver.

The Captain decides he has an opportunity to sink the carrier. He asks one of the crew members who speaks Japanese to send a decoy message requesting rescue. He also indicates he has vital information about enemy ships, and gives the sub's position as his own. The carrier goes to the coordinates provided. The sub releases a marker buoy without cable. This is spotted by the carrier, who release depth charges and give away their position. The sub sinks the carrier, and the captain says, “remember Pearl Harbor”.

== Production ==
Budd Boetticher was working as an assistant director at Columbia Pictures, notably to George Stevens on The More the Merrier. Harry Cohn took a liking to Boetticher and got him to direct the last two days of filming. Boetticher said it was a 12-day picture and recalled "my God, I studied! I prepared every angle, I went over the script line by line, I prepared for those two days as if I were directing Gone With the Wind, because I didn't have any talent for it."

Boetticher called Landers "a no-talent guy. They called him the "D" director there at Columbia; he just wasn't any good. Whenever they had a picture they didn't really care about, they'd give it to Landers." He later performed a similar task on U-Boat Prisoner (1944).
