= Catch light =

Light source that creates reflection in eyes

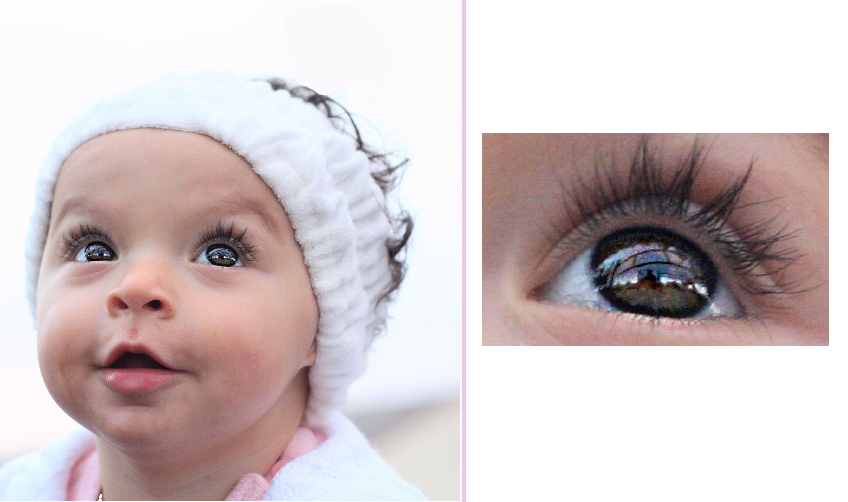
Catch lights in a child's eyes

Catch light or catchlight is a light source that causes a specular highlight in a subject's eye in an image; the term may also refer to the highlight itself. The catch light is either an artifact for a lighting method, or purposely engineered to add a glint or spark to a subject's eye during photography. The technique is effective in both still and motion picture photography; helping to draw attention towards the subject's eyes, which may otherwise get lost among other elements in the scene.

== History ==
The lighting instrument was invented by cinematographer Lucien Ballard during the filming of The Lodger, starring Ballard's wife Merle Oberon. Ballard wanted to lessen the visibility of Oberon's facial scars following a car accident in 1937, successfully done through make up and good lighting; attaching a small light mount on the side of a camera.

== Description ==
The Obie light is a small, compact, three bulb light apparatus whose source emits a broad, continuously adjustable pattern within a two-and-a-half stop range. The bulbs come in three basic settings ranging from low to high which can be finely adjusted within each level by disturbing the bulbs and its compound reflector. As a focused light source, it is usually fairly dim and white in color, as to not affect and overpower any other part of the scene or face. Many other lighting methods, however, are known for the distinctive catch light they produce. Among those methods are: a ring flash, which produces several highlights in a ring, and large softboxes, which produce large, square highlights.

In a patent for an Image Editing Apparatus, a catch light makes it "possible to emphasize or add to an expression on a subject's face". There are different optimum catch lights for each definitive facial expression made by actors. Its process reflects light from the surface of the cornea by a built-in flash unit, and is then exposed by an "image pickup element".

A catch light is not the same as a red-eye effect. In general, red-eye is an undesired effect (caused by the reflection of light from the retina inside the back of the eyeball), while catch lights on the eye remain aesthetically desirable. Especially in portraiture, eyes without catch lights are often said to appear dull or lifeless. Lighting is often arranged in studio portraits specifically to create attractive catch lights.

== Usage in film and television ==
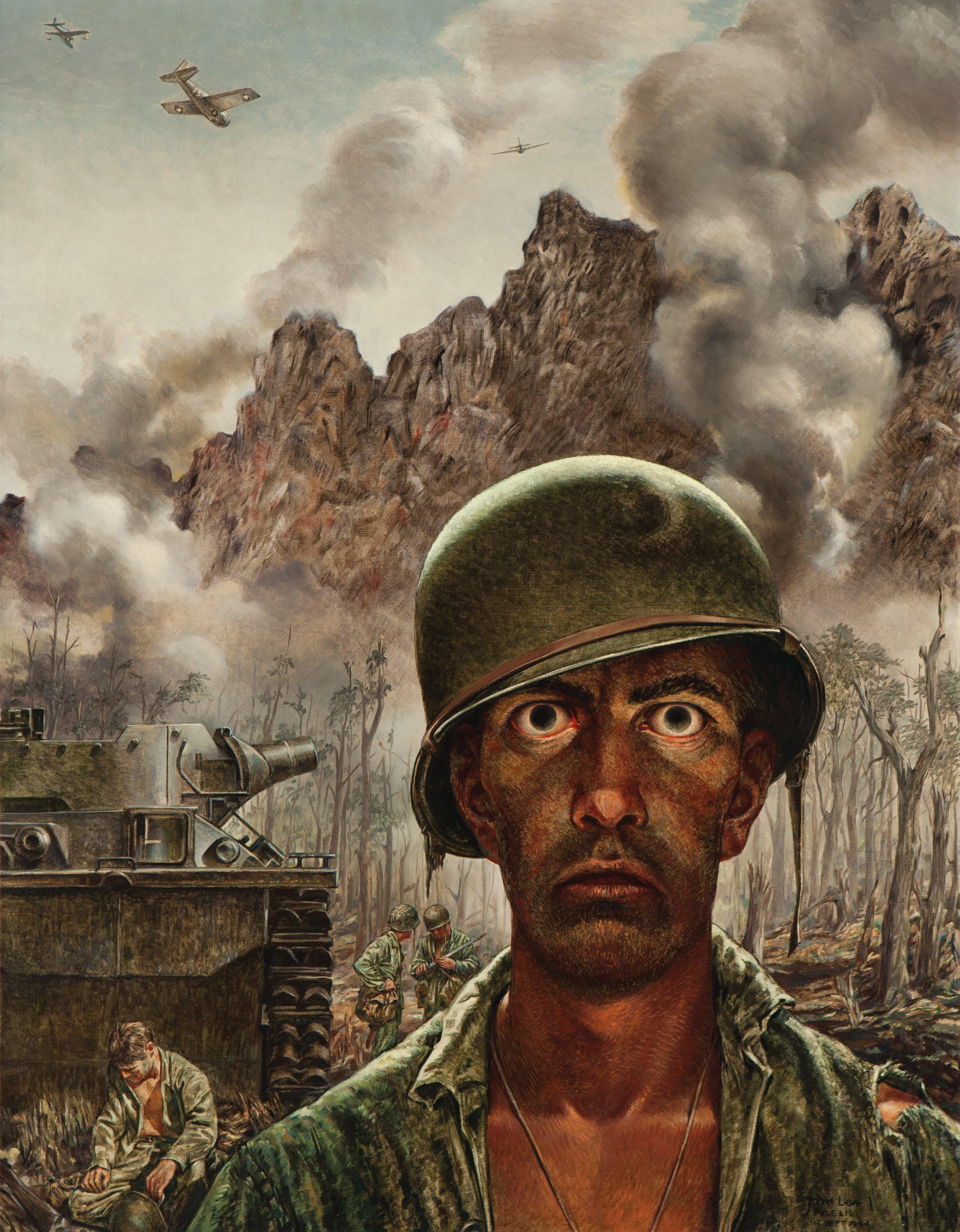
War artist Thomas Lea's The 2000 Yard Stare shows the soldier's eyes lacking catchlight due to his "lifelessness"

This method most often appears as bright spots and reflections of surroundings that can contain entire images in the subject's eyes. This property is sometimes used as a plot point in movies and television. Typically, this trope is represented by computer magnification of an image to gain information about the surroundings of the person being photographed, essentially using the eye as a mirror. Audiences usually perceive eyes without specular highlights to be lifeless or evil, and for this reason many cinematographers specifically eliminate catch lights on antagonistic characters. It is also commonly found in anime, usually used in an over-dramatized manner to show different emotions accompanied by exaggerated expressions.
