= Train to Alcatraz =

- Theatrical release poster
- Directed by: Philip Ford
- Screenplay by: Gerald Geraghty
- Produced by: Lou Brock
- Starring: Don Barry, Janet Martin, William Phipps, Roy Barcroft, June Storey
- Cinematography: Reggie Lanning
- Edited by: Harold Minter
- Music by: Nathan Scott
- Production company: Republic Pictures
- Distributed by: Republic Pictures
- Release date: June 28, 1948
- Running time: 62 minutes
- Country: United States
- Language: English

Train to Alcatraz is a 1948 American prison film directed by Philip Ford and starring Don Barry, Janet Martin, William Phipps, Roy Barcroft, and June Storey.

== Plot ==
Criminals on a train bound for an infamous supermax prison plan to escape, and to do so they receive outside help.

== Cast ==
- Don Barry as Doug Forbes
- Janet Martin as Beatrice
- William Phipps as Tommy Callahan
- Roy Barcroft as Guard Grady
- June Storey as Virginia Marley
- Jane Darwell as Aunt Ella
- Milburn Stone as Bart Kanin
- Chester Clute as Train Conductor Yelvington
- Ralph Dunn as U.S. Marshal Mark Stevens
- Richard Irving as Andy Anders
- John Alvin as Nick
- Denver Pyle as Hutch Hutchins
- Iron Eyes Cody as Geronimo
- Kenneth MacDonald as Guard Reeves
- Harry Harvey as George
- Don Haggerty as Billings
- John Doucette as McHenry

== See also ==
- List of prison films
