= Carlos Arruza =

Mexican bullfighter (1920–1966)

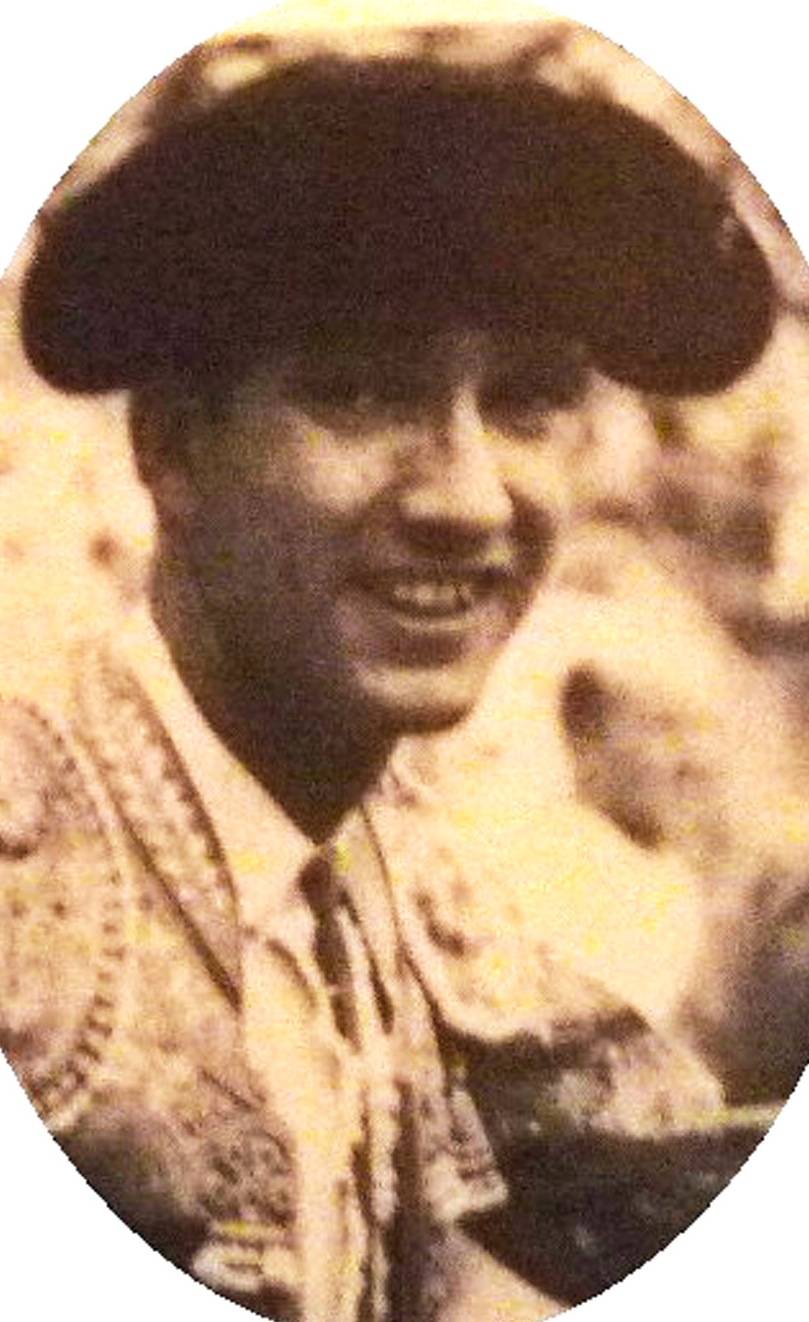

Personal information
- Nickname: El Ciclón (The Cyclone)
- Born: Carlos Ruiz Camino; February 17, 1920 Mexico City, Mexico
- Died: May 20, 1966 (aged 46) Toluca de Lerdo, Mexico

Sport
- Sport: Bullfighting
- Rank: Matador

Carlos Arruza (February 17, 1920 – May 20, 1966), born Carlos Ruiz Camino, was one of the most prominent bullfighters of the 20th century. He was known as "El Ciclón" ("the cyclone").

Arruza was born in Mexico to Spanish parents. He began fighting bulls at age 14 in Mexico City, and moved to Spain in 1944. He and Manolete were Spain's top matadors of the 1940s.

Arruza retired to a ranch outside Mexico City in 1953, but made a comeback as a rejoneador, fighting bulls from horseback. He appeared in two Mexican films about bullfighting, and had a part in the 1960 John Wayne film The Alamo. He was the subject of the 1971 documentary Arruza, directed by Budd Boetticher. Arruza's sons, Manolo and Carlos Jr., also became prominent toreros.

Carlos Arruza died on May 20, 1966, in an automobile accident while on the road from Toluca, State of Mexico, to Mexico City.

Calle Carlos Arruza, a small street in downtown Tucson, Arizona, is named after Arruza. According to Arizona Daily Star, it is one of the few streets the U.S. named after a bullfighter.

The composition "Carlos", by jazz composer and bandleader Gerald Wilson, is dedicated to Arruza. The piece features virtuoso trumpet playing and has been recorded three times by Wilson's band: in 1966 with Jimmy Owens on trumpet, 1989 with Oscar Brashear, and 1995 with Ron Barrows.

== Filmography ==
Year	Title	Role	Notes
1944	Mi reino por un torero	Carlos / Fernando	
1950	Sangre torera		
1960	The Alamo	Lt. Reyes	(final film role)

== Other sources ==
- Encyclopædia Britannica entry
- Lyn Sherwood, Reflections on the Last ‘Golden Age’ And a Lament For The Current “Bronze Age”", La Prensa San Diego, Apr. 30, 2004
- Carlos Arruza at IMDb
- Carlos Arruza at ToroPedia.com, the English language online encyclopedia of bullfighting.
