= The Desperadoes =

1943 film by Charles Vidor

- Theatrical release poster
- Directed by: Charles Vidor
- Screenplay by: Robert Carson
- Story by: Max Brand
- Produced by: Harry Joe Brown
- Starring: Randolph Scott; Claire Trevor; Glenn Ford; Evelyn Keyes; Edgar Buchanan
- Cinematography: George Meehan; Allen M. Davey
- Edited by: Gene Havlick
- Music by: John Leipold
- Color process: Technicolor
- Production company: Columbia Pictures
- Distributed by: Columbia Pictures
- Release date: May 25, 1943 (USA)
- Running time: 87 minutes
- Country: United States
- Language: English
- Box office: $1.1 million (US rentals)

The Desperadoes is a 1943 American Western film directed by Charles Vidor and starring Randolph Scott, Claire Trevor, Glenn Ford, Evelyn Keyes and Edgar Buchanan. Based on a story by Max Brand, the film is about a wanted outlaw who arrives in town to rob a bank that has already been held up. His past and his friendship with the sheriff land them both in trouble. The Desperadoes was the first Columbia Pictures production to be released in Technicolor.

== Plot ==
In 1863, Sheriff Steve Upton tries to keep the law in Red Valley, a small town in Utah. While he is away, the bank is robbed. The holdup was secretly masterminded by corrupt banker Stanley Clanton and the livery stable's boss, "Uncle Willie" McLeod, with the help of ruthless gunman Jack Lester, who shoots three innocent men.

Cheyenne Rogers rides to town. At the stable, Allison McLeod, daughter of Uncle Willie, recognizes the horse as one belonging to Steve. As the stranger goes to the saloon for a drink, Allison rides out to find Steve, whose mount was stolen on the trail.

"The Countess", who runs gambling at the saloon, is in love with Cheyenne, who was hired to help rob the bank but arrived too late. She blames herself for steering Cheyenne toward crime in the first place. Cheyenne finds a legitimate job, breaking broncos at a ranch.

Steve returns to town and is glad to see Cheyenne, an old friend. Lester turns the town against Cheyenne, revealing his outlaw past, and then his sidekick Nitro pulls off another robbery of the bank. A posse rounds up Cheyenne and Nitro and a judge sentences them to hang. But they are sprung from jail by Steve, who is then placed behind bars himself.

Alison goes to the Countess to beg for her help. She does, even though Cheyenne now loves Allison instead of her. Cheyenne slips a gun to Steve through a jailhouse window, and together they set about making things right. Uncle Willie, feeling guilt about his part in the robbery, ends up shooting Clanton in a gunfight. Allison is wed to Cheyenne beside her father's jail cell. After Allison and Cheyenne leave on their honeymoon, Uncle Willie is very surprised to learn his confession to help Cheyenne will likely result in at least a 20-year prison term.

== Cast ==
- Randolph Scott as Sheriff Steve Upton
- Claire Trevor as Countess Maletta
- Glenn Ford as Cheyenne Rogers
- Evelyn Keyes as Allison McLeod
- Edgar Buchanan as Uncle Willie McLeod
- Guinn 'Big Boy' Williams as Nitro Rankin
- Raymond Walburn as Judge Cameron
- Porter Hall as Banker Clanton
- Bernard Nedell as Jack Lester (uncredited)
- Joan Woodbury as Sundown (uncredited)
- Irving Bacon as Dan Walters (uncredited)
- Glenn Strange as Lem (uncredited)

== Production ==
The assistant director was Budd Boetticher, then using his real name, Oscar Boetticher Jr. It was on this film that he met Scott and producer Brown. Fourteen years later, they would all re-team at Columbia to make the series of westerns known as the Ranown cycle (Ranown being a portmanteau of RANdolph and BrOWN).

Parts of the film were shot in Johnson Canyon, Kanab Canyon, the Gap, and Paria, Utah.

== Reception ==
On the review aggregator website Rotten Tomatoes, 80% of 5 critics' reviews are positive.
