= Naval Photographic Science Laboratory =

World War II-era United States Navy command

The United States Naval Photographic Science Laboratory (NPSL) was opened in the midst of the Second World War, on 24 February 1943, at the Anacostia Naval Air Station, Washington, D. C. It was established under the military command of the Chief of the Navy's Bureau of Aeronautics, Division of Photography, with the mission of centralizing the production and preservation of all naval related photography operations.

== History ==
United States Secretary of the Navy Frank Knox, who served in that position from 1941 until his death in 1944.

In July, 1941, United States Secretary of the Navy Frank Knox convened a board to study the photographic needs of the United States Navy. By August, the board had recommended an expansion of operations of the Bureau of Aeronautics to include a photographic facility. The Eastman Kodak Company would serve as architect, engineer, and equipment producer for the project, which initiated construction at Anacostia Naval Air Station in February, 1942. While initial operations of the laboratory commenced in February 1943, construction of the Anacostia facility was not completed, and full photographic operations were not underway, until the summer of 1943.

The three-story brick building that would house the NPSL from 1943-1947 contained over 5,000,000 cubic feet of space. Construction of the facility cost the Navy $2,000,000, with an additional $2,500,000 invested in equipment and materials. Despite the building's size, additional working space had to be found in other buildings at Anacostia. Contributing to the lack of space was the housing of both the Navy Photo Interpretation School as well as the Navy's Photographic Intelligence Center (PIC) on the building's third floor. Sealed off from the rest of the facility, the third floor became one of the most closely guarded top secret areas in all of Washington, D.C. Here, men and women worked around-the-clock to produce photo mosaics for both the island hopping operations of the Pacific theater, as well as for Operation Overlord - the D-Day invasion of France.

Cmdr. Thorne Donnelley, U.S.N.R., commander of the United States Naval Photographic Science Laboratory at Anacostia Naval Air Station, Washington, D.C..

The laboratory was staffed by writers, directors, commentators, animators, cameramen, editors, sound engineers, and musicians. US Navy WAVES were actively involved in many stages of production. A sound stage on site at the Anacostia facility was capable of accommodating several productions simultaneously. The facility's production facilities had the capacity for developing and printing upward of one hundred million feet of film per year.

During its first months of operation, the NPSL provided photographic services exclusively to the Navy, including the conducting of research to develop new photographic equipment and techniques in the areas of motion picture production, still photography, aerial photography, graphic arts and photolithography. It was responsible for providing secret and confidential services at the Anacostia facilities for printing and developing films in quantity and for the training of motion picture camera operators. It was the Navy's sole wartime unit for the production of both live action and animated training films.

During the last two years of the war, the laboratory had expanded its operations to provide production services for any military or governmental activity. The NPSL also served as a storehouse for copies of motion pictures and still photographs sent to the laboratory from war-time fleet and air base operations. This included, but was not limited to, the in theater work of the Naval Aviation Photographic Unit under the command of Cmdr. Edward Jean Steichen. Additionally, the laboratory was tasked with preserving and cataloging much of the historical photographic record of prior US military engagements, for all branches of service, dating as far back as the American Civil War.

== Naval Photographic Center ==
In 1947, while maintaining its operations base at Anacostia, the NPSL was renamed the United States Naval Photographic Center (NPC).

== Gallery ==
Entrance to the United States Naval Photographic Science Laboratory at Anacostia Naval Air Station, Washington, D.C..

Production of US Navy training film at the United States Naval Photographic Science Lab at Anacostia Naval Air Station, Washington, D.C..

US Navy WAVES working in the animation division of the United States Naval Photographic Science Lab at Anacostia Naval Air Station, Washington, D.C..

Voice over work at the United States Naval Photographic Science Lab at Anacostia Naval Air Station, Washington, D.C..

Large prints room at the United States Naval Photographic Science Lab at Anacostia Naval Air Station, Washington, D.C..
