= Magnavox Theatre =

Television series

Magnavox Theatre is an American television anthology of comedies and dramas that aired seven hour-long episodes on CBS in 1950, alternating weekly with Ford Theatre. The first episodes were live, with filmed episodes later on. Episode six (The Three Musketeers), according to CBS, was the first hour-long film made in Hollywood specifically for television. The film was made by Hal Roach Studios Inc., which also made "The Hurricane at Pilgrim Hill", which was the seventh and final episode, scheduled for broadcast on December 8, 1950.

Like its alternate-week counterpart, Magnavox Theatre offered the promise of adaptations of classic literature, novels, and short stories in addition to original dramas. The program was produced by Garth Montgomery. The series was directed by Budd Boetticher and Richard L. Bare. Among its guest stars were Kim Stanley, Robert Clarke, Leslie Nielsen, Marjorie Lord, Dane Clark, Cecil Kellaway, and Edward Everett Horton.

A review in The New York Times cited much negative and little positive about the program's second episode, "In the Fog". It ended with an overall opinion of the first two episodes: "A show of this type is supposed to have a little 'oomph.' All that can be said so far is 'humph.'"

== List of episodes ==
List of episodes
Date	Title	Author	Star
September 15, 1950	"The Tale of the Wolf"	Ferenc Molnár	Ilona Massey
September 29, 1950	"In the Fog"	Richard Harding Davis	Francis L. Sullivan
October 13, 1950	"Strange Harbor"	—	Geraldine Brooks
October 27, 1950	"Lightnin' "	—	Victor Moore
November 10, 1950	"Father, Dear Father"	—	Edward Everett Horton
November 24, 1950	"The Three Musketeers"	Alexandre Dumas	Charles Lang
December 8, 1950	"The Hurricane at Pilgrim Hill"	—	Cecil Kellaway
