= Arruza (film) =

- Directed by: Budd Boetticher
- Screenplay by: Ken Purdy; Budd Boetticher
- Produced by: Budd Boetticher
- Cinematography: Lucien Ballard; Carlos Carbajal
- Edited by: George Crone; Harry Knapp
- Music by: Raúl Lavista
- Production company: The Alpha Corporation
- Distributed by: Avco Embassy
- Release dates: October 25, 1968 (San Francisco); May 22, 1971 (Tijuana)
- Running time: 73 or 75 minutes
- Countries: Mexico; United States
- Language: English

Arruza is a 1968 documentary film about Carlos Arruza directed by Budd Boetticher. It took 10 years to be completed.

== Production ==
Boetticher left Hollywood at the height of his success to make a film about Arruza. "I wanted to do something nobody else in the world could do," he says. "I thought, 'I'll make a picture about bullfighting, and I'll use Carlos playing himself.' ... I had to do that picture. I tossed the whole Hollywood thing over because I couldn't see any other time ever when the best bullfighter in the world, who is the best friend of a well-known motion picture director, could make a picture together."

He recalled, "It should have been just a short project, but it turned into a seven-year nightmare."

Production started May 5, 1958 and took 10 years to complete. Boetticher spent the first three years filming bullfights with Lucien Ballard and Carlos Carbajal.

During filming, Boetticher fought with the Mexican government and unions; ran out of money twice (once in 1961); was evicted from hotels; and put into prison and a sanatorium. Arruza died in May 1966. Following a surge in interest in Arruza, John Sturges acquired a 25% interest in the film in 1967 to enable the film to be completed, with Arruza's heirs owning 30% and Boetticher the rest. Crone, the editor, died in June 1966. Shooting was completed in February 1967.

Jason Robards performed the initial narration but another version features Anthony Quinn.

== Release ==
The film premiered at the San Francisco Film Festival on October 25, 1968, and Boetticher was invited to screen the film at the 1968 Cannes Film Festival.

The film had an official world premiere on May 22, 1971, in Tijuana, Mexico, close to the fifth anniversary of Arruza's death. The film opened in Los Angeles on May 24, 1972. The film's release was delayed because Boetticher says "I wasn't satisfied with it. I didn't want it to come out until I was completely happy with it. It's still a picture I can go and look at now and say, 'boy, I'm glad I made that.'"
