= U-Boat Prisoner =

1944 film by Lew Landers

U-Boat Prisoner, also known as Dangerous Mists, is a 1944 American film. Direction was credited to Lew Landers. The script was written by Aubrey Wisberg. It was based on the book U-Boat Prisoner: The Life Story of a Texas Sailor by Archie Gibbs, who survived the sinking of two ships on successive days in World War II, the freighter Scottsburg, of which he was a crewman, on June 15, 1942, and the freighter Kahuku—which had picked up Scottsburg survivors— on June 16, and was taken prisoner.

== Plot ==
The Gestapo sends Gunther Rudehoff aboard a U-boat commanded by Captain Ganz, much to their mutual displeasure. Rudehoff's mission is to retrieve a valuable Axis agent who escaped aboard a freighter. The agent drops a lifeboat at a prearranged location and swims to it. Ganz, observing this, torpedoes the freighter. However, freighter crewman Archie Gibbs swims to the lifeboat, disposes of the agent, and is taken aboard the U-boat, where he is mistaken for the German-American agent.

== Cast ==
- Bruce Bennett as Archie Gibbs
- Erik Rolf as Capt. Ganz
- John Abbott as Alfonse Lamont
- John Wengraf as Gunther Rudehoff
- George Eldredge as George Acton
- Robert B. Williams (actor) as Destroyer Commander Tom
- Egon Brecher as Prof. Van der Brek
- Anthony Caruso (actor) as Benny
- Arno Frey as Hagemann
- Sven Hugo Borg as Lt. Dorner

== Production ==
Budd Boetticher said, that the film was "an eight day picture". He claims that he was called in to help finish it, as he had with Landers' Submarine Raider.

Boetticher called Landers "a no-talent guy. They called him the "D" director there at Columbia; he just wasn't any good. Whenever they had a picture they didn't really care about, they'd give it to Landers."
