= Escape in the Fog =

1945 film by Budd Boetticher (as Oscar Boetticher Jr.)

- Theatrical release poster
- Directed by: Budd Boetticher (as Oscar Boetticher Jr.)
- Screenplay by: Aubrey Wisberg
- Produced by: Wallace MacDonald
- Starring: Otto Kruger; Nina Foch; William Wright
- Cinematography: George Meehan
- Edited by: Jerome Thoms
- Music by: Mario Castelnuovo-Tedesco
- Color process: Black and white
- Production company: Columbia Pictures
- Distributed by: Columbia Pictures
- Release date: April 5, 1945
- Running time: 63 minutes
- Country: United States
- Language: English

Escape in the Fog is a 1945 American film noir crime film directed by Budd Boetticher (as Oscar Boetticher Jr.) and starring Otto Kruger, Nina Foch and William Wright.

Boetticher called it a "nothing" picture, though he enjoyed working with Nina Foch and Otto Kruger.

== Plot ==
During World War II, a San Francisco nurse dreams of a murder and then meets the "victim" in real life. What she saw in the dream helps her in an effort to thwart enemy spies.

== Cast ==
- Otto Kruger as Paul Devon
- Nina Foch as Eileen Carr
- William Wright as Barry Malcolm
- Konstantin Shayne as Schiller
- Ivan Triesault as Hausmer, Schiller's henchman
- Ernie Adams as George Smith
- Heinie Conklin as Witness (uncredited)
- Frank Mayo as Bartender (uncredited)

== Reception ==
Film critic Jeremy Arnold gave the film a mixed review, writing "Although Wright and Foch have the most screen time, top billing goes to Otto Kruger, the immensely enjoyable character actor who specialized in charming, urbane villains. He's fine as always here but doesn't get much to do. William Wright was an unremarkable actor who appeared almost entirely in B movies in a 45-film career that spanned the 1940s."
