= My Kingdom For... =

My Kingdom For... is a 1985 American documentary directed by Budd Boetticher, where he talks about his interest for bullfighting.
